= 2015–16 Hawaii Rainbow Warriors basketball team =

American college basketball season

2015–16 Hawaii Rainbow Warriors basketball

Big West regular season champions Big West tournament champions Rainbow Classic champions

NCAA tournament, Second Round
- Conference: Big West Conference
- Record: 28–6 (13–3 Big West)
- Head coach: Eran Ganot (1st season)
- Assistant coaches: Adam Jacobsen; Chris Acker (1st season); John Montgomery; Jamie Smith (Director of Basketball Operations)
- Home arena: Stan Sheriff Center

2015–16 Big West men's basketball standings
	Conf.				Overall
Team	W		L	PCT	W		L	PCT
Hawai'i †	13	–	3	.813	28	–	6	.824
UC Irvine	13	–	3	.813	28	–	10	.737
Long Beach State	12	–	4	.750	20	–	15	.571
UC Santa Barbara	11	–	5	.688	19	–	14	.576
UC Davis	6	–	10	.375	11	–	19	.367
UC Riverside	5	–	11	.313	14	–	19	.424
Cal State Northridge*	5	–	11	.313	10	–	20	.333
Cal Poly	4	–	12	.250	10	–	20	.333
Cal State Fullerton	3	–	13	.188	10	–	20	.333
† 2016 Big West tournament winner *ineligible for postseason due to self-imposed ban due to academic fraud violations

The 2015–16 Hawaii Rainbow Warriors basketball team represented the University of Hawaii at Manoa during the 2015–16 NCAA Division I men's basketball season. The Rainbow Warriors, led by first year head coach Eran Ganot, played their home games at the Stan Sheriff Center, and were members of the Big West Conference. They finished the season 28–6, 13–3 in Big West play to tie for the Big West regular season championship. They beat Cal State Fullerton, UC Santa Barbara, and Long Beach State to become champions of the Big West tournament and earn the conference's automatic bid to the NCAA tournament. As a #13 seed, they defeated #4 seeded California in the first round for the school's first ever victory in the NCAA Tournament. They fell to Maryland in the second round.

In December, the NCAA placed a postseason ban on Hawaii for the 2017 season and reduced scholarships through 2018 for improper benefits and actions by the school.

It was also the first time since 1997-98 that there were two sellouts in the same season.

== Previous season ==
The Rainbow Warriors finished the 2014–15 season 22–13, 8–8 in Big West play to finish in fifth place. They lost to UC Irvine in the finals of the Big West tournament.

== Roster ==
2015–16 Hawaii Rainbow Warriors men's basketball team
Players
Coaches

Pos.	#	Name	Height	Weight	Year	Previous school	Hometown
G	0	Isaac Fleming	6 ft 3 in (1.91 m)	180 lb (82 kg)	So	Massanutten Military Academy	Wilmington, DE
G	2	Niko Filipovich	6 ft 0 in (1.83 m)	160 lb (73 kg)	RS So	Bishop Montgomery HS	Rancho Palos Verdes, CA
G	5	Roderick Bobbitt	6 ft 3 in (1.91 m)	205 lb (93 kg)	Sr	Castro Valley HS; Indian Hills CC	Oakland, CA
G	10	Dyrbe Enos	5 ft 10 in (1.78 m)	170 lb (77 kg)	RS Jr	Kamehameha Schools-Kapalama	Aiea, HI
G	11	Quincy Smith	6 ft 1 in (1.85 m)	180 lb (82 kg)	Sr	Deer Valley HS; City College of San Francisco	Antioch, CA
G	12	Sai Tummala	6 ft 6 in (1.98 m)	218 lb (99 kg)	Sr	Brophy Prep; Arizona State	Phoenix, AZ
G	13	Jakob Cornelissen	6 ft 1 in (1.85 m)	165 lb (75 kg)	Fr	Melbourne Grammar	Melbourne, Australia
C	15	Stefan Jovanovic	6 ft 10 in (2.08 m)	235 lb (107 kg)	Jr	Bishop Montgomery HS	Kraljevo, Serbia
G	21	Brocke Stepteau	5 ft 9 in (1.75 m)	160 lb (73 kg)	RS Fr	Dallas Jesuit Prep School	Dallas, TX
G	22	Sheriff Drammeh	6 ft 3 in (1.91 m)	170 lb (77 kg)	Fr	Igelstavikens Gymnasium	Stockholm, Sweden
G	24	Zach Buscher	6 ft 3 in (1.91 m)	165 lb (75 kg)	RS Fr	ʻIolani School	Kailua, HI
F	25	Mike Thomas	6 ft 7 in (2.01 m)	210 lb (95 kg)	Jr	El Camino Real HS	Woodland Hills, CA
G	32	Aaron Valdes	6 ft 5 in (1.96 m)	190 lb (86 kg)	Jr	La Serna HS	Whittier, CA
F	33	Stefan Jankovic	6 ft 11 in (2.11 m)	235 lb (107 kg)	Sr	Huntington Prep; Missouri	Mississauga, ON
F	RS	Jack Purchase	6 ft 9 in (2.06 m)	215 lb (98 kg)	RS So	Carey Grammar; Auburn University	Melbourne, Australia

Head coach

- Eran Ganot (Swarthmore College)

Assistant coach(es)

- Adam Jacobsen (Pacific)
- Chris Acker (Chaminade)
- John Montgomery (Loyola Marymount)
- Jamie Smith (North Carolina) - Director of Basketball Operations

Legend

- (C) Team captain
- (S) Suspended
- (I) Ineligible
- (W) Walk-on
- Injured
- Current redshirt

Roster

== Schedule and results ==
Date time, TV	Rank^{#}	Opponent^{#}	Result	Record	Site (attendance) city, state
Exhibition
11/05/2015*; 7:00 pm		Chaminade	W 101–96 ^{OT}		Stan Sheriff Center (4,680); Honolulu, HI
Non-conference games
11/13/2015*; 7:30 pm, OC Sports		Montana State; Outrigger Resorts Rainbow Classic	W 87–76	1–0	Stan Sheriff Center (6,259); Honolulu, HI
11/15/2015*; 4:30 pm, OC Sports		Coastal Carolina; Outrigger Resorts Rainbow Classic	W 74–63	2–0	Stan Sheriff Center (5,271); Honolulu, HI
11/16/2015*; 11:00 pm, ESPN2		Nevada; Outrigger Resorts Rainbow Classic	W 76–75	3–0	Stan Sheriff Center (5,471); Honolulu, HI
11/22/2015*; 7:30 pm, OC Sports		Nicholls State	W 99–74	4–0	Stan Sheriff Center (5,576); Honolulu, HI
11/28/2015*; 3:07 pm, FSSW+		at Texas Tech	L 74–82	4–1	United Supermarkets Arena (7,132); Lubbock, TX
12/02/2015*; 7:00 pm, OC Sports		Arkansas–Pine Bluff	W 75–47	5–1	Stan Sheriff Center (5,182); Honolulu, HI
12/05/2015*; 7:00 pm, OC Sports		UH–Hilo	W 86–67	6–1	Stan Sheriff Center (4,725); Honolulu, HI
12/12/2015*; 7:00 pm, OC Sports		Hawai'i Pacific	W 83–71	7–1	Stan Sheriff Center (5,042); Honolulu, HI
12/22/2015*; 8:00 pm, ESPNU		Northern Iowa; Diamond Head Classic quarterfinals	W 68–52	8–1	Stan Sheriff Center (8,436); Honolulu, HI
12/23/2015*; 4:00 pm, ESPN2		No. 3 Oklahoma; Diamond Head Classic semifinals	L 81–84	8–2	Stan Sheriff Center (7,365); Honolulu, HI
12/25/2015*; 1:30 pm, ESPN2		Auburn; Diamond Head Classic 3rd place game	W 79–67	9–2	Stan Sheriff Center (7,251); Honolulu, HI
12/29/2015*; 7:00 pm, OC Sports		Mississippi Valley State	W 77–48	10–2	Stan Sheriff Center (5,431); Honolulu, HI
01/02/2016*; 5:30 pm, OC Sports		Howard	W 94–59	11–2	Stan Sheriff Center (6,043); Honolulu, HI
Big West Conference games
01/06/2016; 7:00 pm, OC Sports		Cal Poly	W 86–73	12–2 (1–0)	Stan Sheriff Center (5,885); Honolulu, HI
01/09/2016; 7:00 pm, OC Sports		UC Santa Barbara	W 65–57	13–2 (2–0)	Stan Sheriff Center (7,627); Honolulu, HI
01/14/2016; 9:00 pm, ESPN3		at UC Riverside	W 80–71	14–2 (3–0)	UC Riverside Student Recreation Center (1,596); Riverside, CA
01/16/2016; 8:00 pm, ESPN3		at Cal State Fullerton	W 86–79 ^{OT}	15–2 (4–0)	Titan Gym (993); Fullerton, CA
01/23/2016; 7:00 pm, OC Sports		UC Davis	W 78–62	16–2 (5–0)	Stan Sheriff Center (9,289); Honolulu, HI
01/30/2016; 8:00 pm, OC Sports		Long Beach State	L 64–78	16–3 (5–1)	Stan Sheriff Center (10,300); Honolulu, HI
02/04/2016; 9:00 pm		at UC Santa Barbara	W 76–64	17–3 (6–1)	The Thunderdome (1,722); Santa Barbara, CA
02/06/2016; 5:00 pm, ESPNU		at Cal Poly	W 75–60	18–3 (7–1)	Mott Athletic Center (3,032); San Luis Obispo, CA
02/11/2016; 8:00 pm, OC Sports		UC Irvine	W 74–52	19–3 (8–1)	Stan Sheriff Center (9,826); Honolulu, HI
02/13/2016; 7:00 pm, OC Sports		Cal State Fullerton	W 76–59	20–3 (9–1)	Stan Sheriff Center (8,401); Honolulu, HI
02/18/2016; 5:00 pm, ESPN3		at Cal State Northridge	W 69–63	21–3 (10–1)	Matadome (1,683); Northridge, CA
02/20/2016; 6:30 pm, ESPNU		at UC Irvine	W 75–71	22–3 (11–1)	Bren Events Center (4,312); Irvine, CA
02/25/2016; 7:00 pm, OC Sports		UC Riverside	L 71–77	22–4 (11–2)	Stan Sheriff Center (7,957); Honolulu, HI
02/27/2016; 7:00 pm, ESPN2		Cal State Northridge	W 89–78	23–4 (12–2)	Stan Sheriff Center (10,300); Honolulu, HI
03/03/2016; 5:00 pm		at UC Davis	W 67–65	24–4 (13–2)	The Pavilion (2,247); Davis, CA
03/05/2016; 2:00 pm, Prime Ticket		at Long Beach State	L 72–74	24–5 (13–3)	Walter Pyramid (3,722); Long Beach, CA
Big West tournament
03/10/2016; 12:00 pm, Prime Ticket	(1)	vs. (8) Cal State Fullerton; Quarterfinals	W 75–44	25–5	Honda Center; Anaheim, CA
03/11/2016; 4:00 pm, ESPN3	(1)	vs. (4) UC Santa Barbara; Semifinals	W 88–76	26–5	Honda Center; Anaheim, CA
03/12/2016; 6:30 pm, ESPN2	(1)	vs. (3) Long Beach State; Championship	W 64–60	27–5	Honda Center (5,610); Anaheim, CA
NCAA tournament
3/18/2016; 8:00 am, TBS	(13 S)	vs. (4 S) No. 23 California; First Round	W 77–66	28–5	Spokane Veterans Memorial Arena (11,736); Spokane, WA
3/20/2016; 1:10 pm, TBS	(13 S)	vs. (5 S) No. 18 Maryland; Second Round	L 60–73	28–6	Spokane Veterans Memorial Arena (11,296); Spokane, WA
*Non-conference game. ^{#}Rankings from AP Poll. (#) Tournament seedings in parentheses. S=South Region. All times are in Hawaii Aleutian.

== Rankings ==
Ranking movement Legend: ██ Increase in ranking. ██ Decrease in ranking. (RV) Received votes but unranked. (NR) Not ranked.
Poll	Pre	Wk 2	Wk 3	Wk 4	Wk 5	Wk 6	Wk 7	Wk 8	Wk 9	Wk 10	Wk 11	Wk 12	Wk 13	Wk 14	Wk 15	Wk 16	Wk 17	Wk 18	Wk 19	Final
AP													RV	RV	RV	RV				*N/A
Coaches														RV	RV	RV				

*AP does not release post-NCAA tournament rankings
