= 2015 Maui Invitational =

2015 Maui Invitational Tournament
- Season: 2015–16
- Teams: 8
- Finals site: Lahaina Civic Center, Maui, Hawaii
- Champions: Kansas (2nd title)
- Runner-up: Vanderbilt (2nd title game)
- Semifinalists: Wake Forest (1st semifinal); UCLA (4th semifinal)
- Winning coach: Bill Self (1 title)
- MVP: Wayne Selden Jr. & Frank Mason III (Kansas)

The 2015 Maui Invitational Tournament was an early-season college basketball tournament that was played, for the 32nd time, from November 13 to November 25, 2015. The tournament began in 1984, and was part of the 2015–16 NCAA Division I men's basketball season. The Championship Round was played at the Lahaina Civic Center in Maui, Hawaii from November 23 to 25.

== Brackets ==
=== Opening round ===
The opening round was played on November 13–16 at various sites around the country.

==== November 13 ====
- Kansas 109, Northern Colorado 72 in Lawrence, Kansas
- UNLV 74, Cal Poly 72 in Paradise, Nevada
- Vanderbilt 80, Austin Peay 41 in Nashville, Tennessee
- Wake Forest 78, UMBC 73 in Winston-Salem, North Carolina

==== November 15 ====
- UCLA 88, Cal Poly 83 in Los Angeles, California

==== November 16 ====
- Indiana 102, Austin Peay 76 in Bloomington, Indiana
- St. John's 75, UMBC 53 in New York City

=== Regional round ===
Semifinals; November 21
Northern Colorado | 72
UMBC | 81
Cal Poly | 73
Austin Peay | 64

Final; November 22
UMBC | 65
Cal Poly | 78
Third Place; November 22
Northern Colorado | 76
Austin Peay | 91

*Games played at Bank of Colorado Arena in Greeley, Colorado

=== Championship round ===
The Championship round was played from November 23–25 at Lahaina Civic Center in Maui, Hawaii.

Fifth Place Game; November 25
13 | Indiana | 69
UNLV | 72
Seventh Place Game
St. John's | 100
Chaminade | 93

Consolation 2nd Round; November 24
St. John's | 73
13 | Indiana | 83
Chaminade | 73
UNLV | 93

Quarterfinals; November 23
St. John's | 55
19 | Vanderbilt | 92
Wake Forest | 82
13 | Indiana | 78
5 | Kansas | 123
Chaminade | 72
UNLV | 75
UCLA | 77

Semifinals; November 24
19 | Vanderbilt | 86
Wake Forest | 64
5 | Kansas | 92
UCLA | 73

Championship; November 25
19 | Vanderbilt | 63
5 | Kansas | 70
Third Place Game
Wake Forest | 80
UCLA | 77
