= 2015–16 Long Beach State 49ers men's basketball team =

American college basketball season

2015–16 Long Beach State 49ers men's basketball
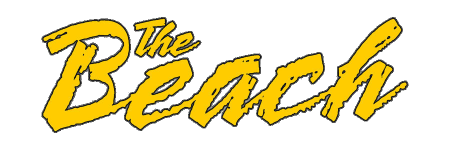

NIT, First round
- Conference: Big West Conference
- Record: 20–15 (12–4 Big West)
- Head coach: Dan Monson (9th season)
- Assistant coaches: Rod Palmer; Eric Brown; Myke Scholl
- Home arena: Walter Pyramid

2015–16 Big West men's basketball standings
	Conf.				Overall
Team	W		L	PCT	W		L	PCT
Hawai'i †	13	–	3	.813	28	–	6	.824
UC Irvine	13	–	3	.813	28	–	10	.737
Long Beach State	12	–	4	.750	20	–	15	.571
UC Santa Barbara	11	–	5	.688	19	–	14	.576
UC Davis	6	–	10	.375	11	–	19	.367
UC Riverside	5	–	11	.313	14	–	19	.424
Cal State Northridge*	5	–	11	.313	10	–	20	.333
Cal Poly	4	–	12	.250	10	–	20	.333
Cal State Fullerton	3	–	13	.188	10	–	20	.333
† 2016 Big West tournament winner *ineligible for postseason due to self-imposed ban due to academic fraud violations

The 2015–16 Long Beach State 49ers men's basketball team represented California State University, Long Beach during the 2015–16 NCAA Division I men's basketball season. The 49ers were led by ninth year head coach Dan Monson and played their home games at Walter Pyramid. They were members of the Big West Conference. They finished the season 20–15, 12–4 in Big West play to finish in third place. They defeated UC Riverside and UC Irvine to advance to the championship game of the Big West tournament where they lost to Hawaii. They were invited to the National Invitation Tournament where they lost in the first round to Washington.

== Previous season ==
The 49ers finished the 2014–15 season with a record of 16–17, 10–6 in conference and finishing in fourth place. They lost in the first round of the Big West tournament to Hawaii.

== Roster ==
Number	Name	Position	Height	Weight	Year	Hometown
0	Gabe Levin	Forward	6-7	225	Sophomore	Oak Park, Illinois
2	Nick Faust	Guard	6-6	210	Senior	Baltimore, Maryland
3	Noah Blackwell	Guard	6–2	190	Freshman	Roseville, California
4	Yussuf Temidayo	Forward	6–7	260	Freshman	Oakland, California
5	Mason Riggins	Forward	6-8	255	Freshman	Whitewright, Texas
10	Quentin Shropshire	Forward	6-6	210	Sophomore	Los Angeles, California
12	Alex Rifkind	Guard	6-1	170	Freshman	Boca Raton, Florida
14	Branford Jones	Guard	6–1	175	Sophomore	Missouri City, Texas
15	A.J. Spencer	Guard	6-3	210	Senior	Shawnee, Kansas
20	Anson Moye	Guard	6–0	185	Senior	Thousand Oaks, California
21	Justin Bibbins	Guard	5–8	150	Sophomore	Carson, California
23	Roschon Prince	Forward	6–6	230	Sophomore	Long Beach, California
24	Travis Hammonds	Guard/Forward	6–6	225	Sophomore	Columbia, South Carolina

== Schedule ==
Date time, TV	Rank^{#}	Opponent^{#}	Result	Record	Site (attendance) city, state
Non-conference regular season
11/14/2015*; 4:00 pm		BYU-Hawaii	W 91–57	1–0	Walter Pyramid (4,239); Long Beach, CA
11/16/2015*; 10:45 pm, ESPN2		BYU; College Hoops Tip-Off Marathon	W 66–65	2–0	Walter Pyramid (3,412); Long Beach, CA
11/19/2015*; 4:00 pm, ESPNU		vs. Seton Hall; Charleston Classic quarterfinal	W 80–77	3–0	TD Arena (3,437); Charleston, SC
11/20/2015*; 6:30 pm, ESPNU		vs. No. 6 Virginia; Charleston Classic semifinal	L 52–87	3–1	TD Arena (3,417); Charleston, SC
11/22/2015*; 4:00 pm, ESPNU		vs. Oklahoma State; Charleston Classic 3rd place game	L 77–82	3–2	TD Arena (2,710); Charleston, SC
11/27/2014*; 5:30 pm, ESPN3		at Oklahoma State; Charleston Classic	L 73–79	3–3	Gallagher-Iba Arena (5,192); Stillwater, OK
12/01/2015*; 7:30 pm, Prime Ticket		San Diego State	L 72–76	3–4	Walter Pyramid (4,365); Long Beach, CA
12/03/2015*; 6:00 pm		at Colorado State	W 83–77	4–4	Moby Arena (3,581); Fort Collins, CO
12/05/2015*; 4:00 pm		New Mexico State	W 67–53	5–4	Walter Pyramid (2,376); Long Beach, CA
12/06/2015*; 6:00 pm, P12N		at UCLA	L 76–83	5–5	Pauley Pavilion (6,443); Los Angeles, CA
12/09/2015*; 7:00 pm, TheW.tv		at Pepperdine	L 75–77	5–6	Firestone Fieldhouse (1,349); Malibu, CA
12/12/2015*; 4:00 pm		Tampa	W 87–60	6–6	Walter Pyramid (2,146); Long Beach, CA
12/18/2015*; 6:00 pm, P12N		at Oregon	L 73–94	6–7	Matthew Knight Arena (6,112); Eugene, OR
12/22/2015*; 6:00 pm, P12N		at No. 8 Arizona	L 70–85	6–8	McKale Center (14,644); Tucson, AZ
12/30/2015*; 1:00 pm, RSN		at No. 15 Duke	L 81–103	6–9	Cameron Indoor Stadium (9,314); Durham, NC
Big West regular season
01/06/2016; 7:00 pm, ESPN3		at Cal State Northridge	W 94–79	7–9 (1–0)	Matadome (704); Northridge, CA
01/09/2016; 4:00 pm, ESPN3		UC Davis	W 59–47	8–9 (2–0)	Walter Pyramid (3,276); Long Beach, CA
01/14/2016; 7:30 pm, Prime Ticket		UC Irvine	L 59–72	8–10 (2–1)	Walter Pyramid (3,713); Long Beach, CA
01/16/2016; 7:00 pm		at Cal Poly	L 92–96 ^{2OT}	8–11 (2–2)	Mott Gym (3,032); San Luis Obispo, CA
01/20/2016; 7:00 pm		at UC Santa Barbara	W 77–67	9–11 (3–2)	UCSB Events Center (1,975); Santa Barbara, CA
01/23/2016; 7:00 pm		at UC Riverside	L 72–74	9–12 (3–3)	UC Riverside Student Recreation Center (935); Riverside, CA
01/28/2016; 7:30 pm, Prime Ticket		UC Santa Barbara	W 80–70	10–12 (4–3)	Walter Pyramid (3,064); Long Beach, CA
01/30/2016; 11:00 pm		at Hawaii	W 78–64	11–12 (5–3)	Stan Sheriff Center (10,300); Honolulu, HI
02/06/2016; 7:00 pm		Cal State Northridge	W 81–76	12–12 (6–3)	Walter Pyramid (2,538); Long Beach, CA
02/11/2016; 7:00 pm, ESPN3		Cal Poly	W 73–70	13–12 (7–3)	Walter Pyramid (2,627); Long Beach, CA
02/13/2016; 7:00 pm		at UC Davis	W 57–48	14–12 (8–3)	The Pavilion (2,829); Davis, CA
02/20/2016; 7:30 pm, Prime Ticket		Cal State Fullerton	W 70–57	15–12 (9–3)	Walter Pyramid (3,519); Long Beach, CA
02/24/2016; 7:00 pm, ESPN3		at UC Irvine	L 67–90	15–13 (9–4)	Bren Events Center (2,654); Irvine, CA
02/27/2016; 4:00 pm		UC Riverside	W 66–55	16–13 (10–4)	Walter Pyramid (2,804); Long Beach, CA
03/02/2016; 7:00 pm, ESPN3		at Cal State Fullerton	W 75–73	17–13 (11–4)	Titan Gym (1,130); Fullerton, CA
03/05/2016; 4:00 pm, Prime Ticket		Hawaii	W 74–72	18–13 (12–4)	Walter Pyramid (3,722); Long Beach, CA
Big West tournament
03/10/1016; 8:30 pm, Prime Ticket	(3)	vs. (6) UC Riverside; Quarterfinals	W 82–74	19–13	Honda Center (4,246); Anaheim, CA
03/11/2016; 9:00 pm, ESPNU	(3)	vs. (2) UC Irvine; Semifinals	W 77–72	20–13	Honda Center (5,134); Anaheim, CA
03/12/2016; 8:30 pm, ESPN2	(3)	vs. (1) Hawaii; Championship game	L 60–64	20–14	Honda Center (5,610); Anaheim, CA
NIT
03/15/2016*; 5:00 pm, ESPN2	(6)	at (3) Washington; First round – South Carolina Bracket	L 102–107	20–15	Alaska Airlines Arena (3,505); Seattle, WA
*Non-conference game. ^{#}Rankings from AP Poll. (#) Tournament seedings in parentheses. All times are in Pacific Time(#) Tournament seedings in parentheses..
