= 2015–16 UC Davis Aggies men's basketball team =

American college basketball season

2015–16 UC Davis Aggies men's basketball
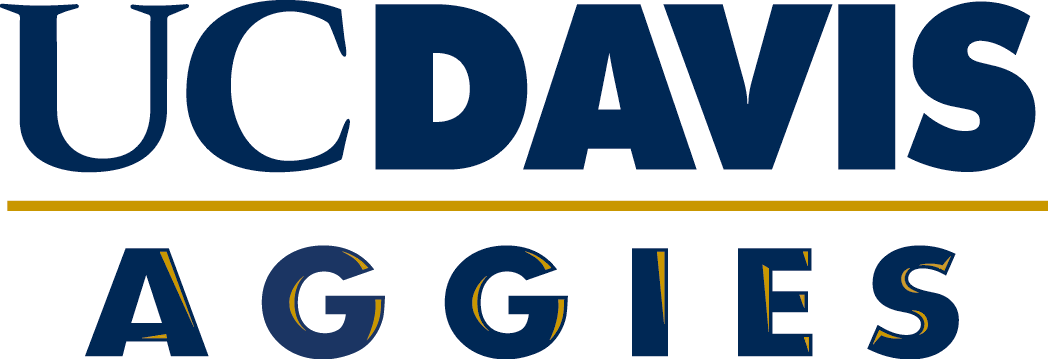
- Conference: Big West Conference
- Record: 11–19 (6–10 Big West)
- Head coach: Jim Les (5th season)
- Assistant coaches: Kevin Nosek; Chris Davis; Kyle Vogt
- Home arena: The Pavilion

2015–16 Big West men's basketball standings
	Conf.				Overall
Team	W		L	PCT	W		L	PCT
Hawai'i †	13	–	3	.813	28	–	6	.824
UC Irvine	13	–	3	.813	28	–	10	.737
Long Beach State	12	–	4	.750	20	–	15	.571
UC Santa Barbara	11	–	5	.688	19	–	14	.576
UC Davis	6	–	10	.375	11	–	19	.367
UC Riverside	5	–	11	.313	14	–	19	.424
Cal State Northridge*	5	–	11	.313	10	–	20	.333
Cal Poly	4	–	12	.250	10	–	20	.333
Cal State Fullerton	3	–	13	.188	10	–	20	.333
† 2016 Big West tournament winner *ineligible for postseason due to self-imposed ban due to academic fraud violations

The 2015–16 UC Davis Aggies men's basketball team represented the University of California, Davis during the 2015–16 NCAA Division I men's basketball season. The Aggies were led by fifth-year head coach Jim Les and played their home games at The Pavilion in Davis, California as members of the Big West Conference. They finished the season 11–19, 6–10 in Big West play, to finish in fifth place. They lost in the quarterfinals of the Big West tournament to UC Santa Barbara.

== Roster ==
2015–16 UC Davis Aggies men's basketball team
Players
Coaches

Pos.	#	Name	Height	Weight	Year	Previous school	Hometown
G	0	Brynton Lemar	6 ft 4 in (1.93 m)	195 lb (88 kg)	Jr	St. Augustine HS	San Diego, CA
G	1	Lawrence White	6 ft 4 in (1.93 m)	203 lb (92 kg)	Jr	Burroughs HS; Antelope Valley College	Burbank, CA
G	2	Darius Graham	5 ft 10 in (1.78 m)	180 lb (82 kg)	RS Jr	Sacramento HS	Sacramento, CA
G	5	Siler Schneider	6 ft 3 in (1.91 m)	183 lb (83 kg)	Fr	Lansing HS	Lansing, KS
G	11	Chima Moneke	6 ft 6 in (1.98 m)	216 lb (98 kg)	Jr	UC Senior Secondary College Lake Ginninderra; Northeast Community College	Canberra, Australia
F	12	Georgi Funtarov	6 ft 8 in (2.03 m)	210 lb (95 kg)	Jr	Vermont Academy	Sofia, Bulgaria
F	13	J. T. Adenrele (injured)	6 ft 7 in (2.01 m)	235 lb (107 kg)	RS Sr	Oakmont HS	Roseville, CA
G	14	Luca Ferrari (W)	6 ft 1 in (1.85 m)	180 lb (82 kg)	RS Fr	Notre Dame HS	Studio City, CA
F	21	Josh Fox	6 ft 6 in (1.98 m)	210 lb (95 kg)	Sr	Sacred Heart Cathedral Prep; City College of San Francisco	Daly City, CA
C	22	Neal Monson	6 ft 10 in (2.08 m)	230 lb (104 kg)	Jr	Waterford School; Salt Lake CC	Sandy City, UT
G	23	Rogers Printup	6 ft 4 in (1.93 m)	205 lb (93 kg)	Fr	Orange Lutheran HS	Orange, CA
F/C	24	Nolan Berry	6 ft 10 in (2.08 m)	235 lb (107 kg)	RS So	De Smet HS; Butler	St. Louis, MO
G	30	Joe Mooney	6 ft 3 in (1.91 m)	173 lb (78 kg)	Fr	Notre Dame College Prep	Wauconda, IL
G	31	Michael Onyebalu (W)	6 ft 3 in (1.91 m)	190 lb (86 kg)	So	Warren HS	Inglewood, CA
F	44	Garrison Goode	6 ft 7 in (2.01 m)	220 lb (100 kg)	Fr	Dominican HS	River Hills, WI

Head coach

- Jim Les (Bradley)

Assistant coach(es)

- Kevin Nosek (UC Davis)
- Chris Davis (Michigan)
- Kyle Vogt (Lakeland)

Legend

- (C) Team captain
- (S) Suspended
- (I) Ineligible
- (W) Walk-on
- Injured
- Current redshirt

Roster
Last update: March 28, 2025

== Schedule ==
Date time, TV	Rank^{#}	Opponent^{#}	Result	Record	Site (attendance) city, state
Non-conference schedule
November 13, 2015*; 5:30 p.m.		North Dakota State	L 71–79 ^{OT}	0–1	The Pavilion (3,366); Davis, CA
November 15, 2015*; 4:00 p.m.		Portland	W 79–66	1–1	The Pavilion (1,372); Davis, CA
November 18, 2015*; 7:00 p.m.		Fresno Pacific	W 76–46	2–1	The Pavilion (1,088); Davis, CA
November 24, 2015*; 7:00 p.m.		at Sacramento State	L 79–84	2–2	Hornets Nest (1,472); Sacramento, CA
November 28, 2015*; 6:00 p.m.		at Utah Valley	W 82–70	3–2	UCCU Center (2,318); Orem, UT
December 2, 2015*; 7:00 p.m.		Sacramento State	W 66–61	4–2	The Pavilion (2,934); Davis, CA
December 4, 2015*; 7:00 p.m.		at Saint Mary's	L 67–81	4–3	McKeon Pavilion (2,506); Moraga, CA
December 15, 2015*; 7:00 p.m.		at San Diego	L 55–61	4–4	Jenny Craig Pavilion (1,964); San Diego, CA
December 19, 2015*; 7:00 p.m.		Air Force	L 60–67	4–5	The Pavilion (1,176); Davis, CA
December 22, 2015*; 7:00 p.m.		Idaho	L 51–68	4–6	The Pavilion (1,211); Davis, CA
December 28, 2015*; 7:00 p.m.		at Seattle	L 75–80 ^{OT}	4–7	KeyArena (1,370); Seattle, WA
December 30, 2015*; 6:00 p.m.		at Boise State	L 56–64	4–8	Taco Bell Arena (5,592); Boise, ID
January 2, 2016*; 3:00 p.m.		Holy Names	W 74–49	5–8	The Pavilion (1,377); Davis, CA
Big West Conference schedule
January 7, 2016; 7:30 p.m., Prime Ticket		at UC Irvine	L 55–76	5–9 (0–1)	Bren Events Center (2,831); Irvine, CA
January 9, 2016; 4:00 p.m., ESPN3		at Long Beach State	L 47–59	5–10 (0–2)	Walter Pyramid (3,276); Long Beach, CA
January 14, 2016; 7:30 p.m.		Cal State Northridge	W 63–62	6–10 (1–2)	The Pavilion (2,498); Davis, CA
January 21, 2016; 7:00 p.m.		UC Riverside	W 58–55	7–10 (2–2)	The Pavilion (2,247); Davis, CA
January 23, 2016; 9:00 p.m.		at Hawaii	L 62–78	7–11 (2–3)	Stan Sheriff Center (9,289); Honolulu, HI
January 27, 2016; 7:00 p.m.		Cal State Fullerton	W 69–64	8–11 (3–3)	The Pavilion; Davis, CA
January 30, 2015; 5:30 p.m.		Cal Poly	W 66–52	9–11 (4–3)	The Pavilion (1,637); Davis, CA
February 4, 2016; 7:00 p.m., ESPN3		at Cal State Fullerton	L 57–61	9–12 (4–4)	Titan Gym (953); Fullerton, CA
February 6, 2016; 7:00 p.m.		at UC Riverside	W 50–49	10–12 (5–4)	UC Riverside Student Recreation Center; Riverside, CA
February 11, 2016; 7:00 p.m.		UC Santa Barbara	L 66–72	10–13 (5–5)	The Pavilion (2,205); Davis, CA
February 13, 2016; 5:30 p.m.		Long Beach State	L 48–57	10–14 (5–6)	The Pavilion (2,829); Davis, CA
February 18, 2016; 7:00 p.m.		at Cal Poly	L 53–58	10–15 (5–7)	Mott Gym (2,363); San Luis Obispo, CA
February 20, 2016; 7:00 p.m.		at UC Santa Barbara	L 55–62	10–16 (5–8)	The Thunderdome (2,116); Santa Barbara, CA
February 27, 2016; 5:30 p.m.		UC Irvine	L 61–62	10–17 (5–9)	The Pavilion (4,573); Davis, CA
March 3, 2016; 7:00 p.m.		Hawaii	L 65–67	10–18 (5–10)	The Pavilion (2,247); Davis, CA
March 5, 2016; 7:00 p.m.		at Cal State Northridge	W 87–83	11–18 (6–10)	Matadome (769); Northridge, CA
Big West tournament
March 10, 2016; 2:30 p.m., Prime Ticket	(5)	vs. (4) UC Santa Barbara; Quarterfinals	L 61–87	11–19	Honda Center; Anaheim, CA
*Non-conference game. ^{#}Rankings from AP poll. (#) Tournament seedings in parentheses. All times are in Pacific.
