= 2015–16 Cal Poly Mustangs men's basketball team =

American college basketball season

2015–16 Cal Poly Mustangs men's basketball
- Conference: Big West
- Record: 10–20 (4–12 Big West)
- Head coach: Joe Callero (7th season)
- Assistant coaches: Paul Fortier; Sam Kirby; Mitch Reaves
- Home arena: Mott Athletic Center

2015–16 Big West men's basketball standings
	Conf.				Overall
Team	W		L	PCT	W		L	PCT
Hawai'i †	13	–	3	.813	28	–	6	.824
UC Irvine	13	–	3	.813	28	–	10	.737
Long Beach State	12	–	4	.750	20	–	15	.571
UC Santa Barbara	11	–	5	.688	19	–	14	.576
UC Davis	6	–	10	.375	11	–	19	.367
UC Riverside	5	–	11	.313	14	–	19	.424
Cal State Northridge*	5	–	11	.313	10	–	20	.333
Cal Poly	4	–	12	.250	10	–	20	.333
Cal State Fullerton	3	–	13	.188	10	–	20	.333
† 2016 Big West tournament winner *ineligible for postseason due to self-imposed ban due to academic fraud violations

The 2015–16 Cal Poly Mustangs men's basketball team represented the California Polytechnic State University in the 2015–16 NCAA Division I men's basketball season. They were led by seventh year head coach Joe Callero and played their home games at Mott Athletic Center. They were members of the Big West Conference. They finished the season 10–20, 4–12 in Big West play to finish in eighth place. They lost in the quarterfinals of the Big West tournament to UC Irvine.

== Previous season ==
The Mustangs finished 13–16, 6–10 in Big West play to finish in seventh place. They lost in the first round of the Big West tournament where they lost to UC Santa Barbara.

== Departures ==
Name	Number	Pos.	Height	Weight	Year	Hometown	Notes
Maliik Love	3	G	6'2"	209	Senior	Oceanside, CA	Graduated
Alberto Ganis	4	G	6'5"	211	Senior	Tavagnacco, Italy	Graduated
Michael Bolden	30	G	6'5"	192	Senior	Mission Viejo, CA	Graduated
Anthony Silvestri	42	F	6'7"	218	Senior	San Francisco, CA	Graduated

== Pre-season ==
College recruiting information
Name	Hometown	School	Height	Weight	Commit date
Hank Hollingsworth; C	Chelan, Washington	Chelan High School	6 ft 10 in (2.08 m)	235 lb (107 kg)	Oct 15, 2014
Hank Hollingsworth; C	Recruit ratings: Scout: Rivals: 247Sports: ESPN:				
Serigne Athj; SF	Pasadena, California	Birmingham HS	6 ft 4 in (1.93 m)	195 lb (88 kg)	Aug 7, 2014
Serigne Athj; SF	Recruit ratings: Scout: Rivals: 247Sports: ESPN:				
Jaylen Shead; PG	Pflugerville, Texas	Connally HS	6 ft 1 in (1.85 m)	170 lb (77 kg)	Jul 28, 2014
Jaylen Shead; PG	Recruit ratings: Scout: Rivals: 247Sports: ESPN:				
Overall recruit ranking:
Note: In many cases, Scout, Rivals, 247Sports, On3, and ESPN may conflict in their listings of height and weight.; In these cases, the average was taken. ESPN grades are on a 100-point scale.; Sources: "Cal Poly 2015 Basketball Commitments". Rivals.; "2015 Cal Poly Commits". Scout.; "ESPN". ESPN.; "Scout.com Team Recruiting Rankings". Scout.; "2015 Team Ranking". Rivals.

== Roster ==
2015–16 Cal Poly Mustangs men's basketball team
Players
Coaches

Pos.	#	Name	Height	Weight	Year	Previous school	Hometown
G	0	David Nwaba	6 ft 4 in (1.93 m)	210 lb (95 kg)	Sr	University HS	Los Angeles, California
F	1	Aleks Abrams	6 ft 8 in (2.03 m)	265 lb (120 kg)	So	Oaks Christian School	Westlake Village, California
G	2	Trevor John	6 ft 3 in (1.91 m)	183 lb (83 kg)	RS Fr	Monte Vista HS	Danville, California
G	4	Jaylen Shead	6 ft 1 in (1.85 m)	170 lb (77 kg)	Fr	Connally HS	Pflugerville, Texas
G	5	Reese Morgan	6 ft 2 in (1.88 m)	200 lb (91 kg)	Sr	Peninsula HS	San Pedro, California
G	10	Ridge Shipley	6 ft 0 in (1.83 m)	181 lb (82 kg)	Jr	Hebron HS	Carrollton, Texas
G	11	Taylor Sutlive	6 ft 3 in (1.91 m)	194 lb (88 kg)	RS So	Churchill HS	San Antonio, Texas
G	14	Mark Patterson	6 ft 1 in (1.85 m)	174 lb (79 kg)	So	Mayfair HS	Bellflower, California
F	15	Josh Martin	6 ft 8 in (2.03 m)	212 lb (96 kg)	RS Fr	Bothell HS	Seattle, Washington
F	21	Luke Meikle	6 ft 9 in (2.06 m)	209 lb (95 kg)	RS So	Bellarmine Prep	Tacoma, Washington
F	24	Serigne Athj	6 ft 4 in (1.93 m)	195 lb (88 kg)	Fr	Birmingham HS	Pasadena, California
F	25	Joel Awich	6 ft 7 in (2.01 m)	217 lb (98 kg)	Sr	Tartan HS	St. Paul, Minnesota
C	30	Hank Hollingsworth	6 ft 10 in (2.08 m)	235 lb (107 kg)	Fr	Chelan HS	Chelan, Washington
F	34	Brian Bennett	6 ft 9 in (2.06 m)	288 lb (131 kg)	Sr	Plainfield East HS	Plainfield, Illinois
F	44	Zach Gordon	6 ft 8 in (2.03 m)	239 lb (108 kg)	RS Jr	Archbishop Murphy HS	Lynnwood, Washington

Head coach

- Joe Callero

Assistant coach(es)

- Paul Fortier
- Sam Kirby
- Mitch Reaves

Legend

- (C) Team captain
- (S) Suspended
- (I) Ineligible
- (W) Walk-on
- Injured
- Current redshirt

Roster
Last update: 08/05/2015

== Schedule and results ==
Date time, TV	Rank^{#}	Opponent^{#}	Result	Record	High points	High rebounds	High assists	Site (attendance) city, state
Exhibition
Nov. 5*; 7:00 pm		Cal State San Bernardino	W 73–60	–	19 – Nwaba	9 – Nwaba	5 – Shipley	Mott Athletic Center (1,076); San Luis Obispo, CA
Non-conference regular season
Nov. 13*; 7:00 pm		at UNLV; Maui Invitational Opening Round	L 72–74	0–1	15 – 2 tied	5 – 3 tied	3 – 2 tied	Thomas & Mack Center (12,201); Paradise, NV
Nov. 15*; 7:00 pm, P12N		at UCLA; Maui Invitational Opening Round	L 83–88	0–2	20 – Morgan	6 – Abrams	6 – Nwaba	Pauley Pavilion (6,595); Los Angeles, CA
Nov. 18*; 7:00 pm		Cal State Monterey Bay	W 71–62	1–2	19 – Nwaba	10 – Gordon	4 – Shipley	Mott Athletic Center (1,364); San Luis Obispo, CA
Nov. 21*; 1:30 pm		vs. Austin Peay; Maui Invitational Regional Games	W 73–64	2–2	19 – Awich	6 – 2 tied	4 – 2 tied	Bank of Colorado Arena (N/A); Greeley, CO
Nov. 22*; 9:00 am		vs. UMBC; Maui Invitational Regional Games	W 78–65	3–2	18 – Awich	9 – Awich	8 – Nwaba	Bank of Colorado Arena (475); Greeley, CO
Nov. 28*; 7:30 pm		University of Antelope Valley	W 85–55	4–2	15 – Awich	8 – 2 tied	7 – Nwaba	Mott Athletic Center (1,884); San Luis Obispo, CA
Dec. 3*; 7:00 pm		IPFW	L 73–75	4–3	16 – Meikle	9 – Awich	7 – Nwaba	Mott Athletic Center (1,465); San Luis Obispo, CA
Dec. 05*; 7:00 pm		Fresno State	W 77–65	5–3	16 – Sutlive	8 – Nwaba	7 – Nwaba	Mott Athletic Center (2,861); San Luis Obispo, CA
Dec. 14*; 7:00 pm, CHN		at Saint Mary's	L 63–93	5–4	18 – Meikle	6 – Meikle	2 – Nwaba	McKeon Pavilion (2,183); Moraga, CA
Dec. 17*; 7:00 pm, P12N		at USC	L 82–101	5–5	15 – Nwaba	5 – Shead	6 – Shead	Galen Center (2,811); Los Angeles, CA
Dec. 20*; 12:00 pm		at Texas A&M-Corpus Christi	L 74–80	5–6	12 – Sutlive	5 – Awich	3 – Nwaba	American Bank Center (917); Corpus Christi, TX
Dec. 22*; 5:00 pm		at UTSA	W 88–73	6–6	12 – 4 tied	6 – 3 tied	7 – Shead	Convocation Center (795); San Antonio, TX
Dec. 29*; 5:00 pm, SECN+		at No. 20 Texas A&M	L 63–82	6–7	16 – Morgan	7 – Gordon	6 – Nwaba	Reed Arena (7,442); College Station, TX
Big West regular season
Jan. 6; 9:00 pm, OC Sports		at Hawaii	L 73–86	6–8 (0–1)	17 – Morgan	8 – Nwaba	4 – Sutlive	Stan Sheriff Center (5,885); Honolulu, HI
Jan. 14; 7:00 pm		UC Santa Barbara	L 73–76	6–9 (0–2)	16 – Nwaba	9 – Nwaba	3 – 3 tied	Mott Athletic Center (3,032); San Luis Obispo, CA
Jan. 16; 7:00 pm		Long Beach State	W 96–92 ^{2OT}	7–9 (1–2)	21 – Bennett	12 – Bennett	6 – Nwaba	Mott Athletic Center (3,032); San Luis Obispo, CA
Jan. 21; 7:00 pm, ESPN3		at Cal State Northridge	L 74–76	7–10 (1–3)	14 – Bennett/Nwaba	7 – Bennett	4 – Nwaba	Matadome (867); Northridge, CA
Jan. 23; 7:00 pm, ESPN3		at Cal State Fullerton	W 83–75	8–10 (2–3)	22 – Coggins	8 – Akoh	4 – Allman	Titan Gym (892); Fullerton, CA
Jan. 28; 7:00 pm		UC Riverside	L 68–72	8–11 (2–4)	21 – Bennett	5 – Tied	3 – Shipley	Mott Athletic Center (2,134); San Luis Obispo, CA
Jan. 30; 8:30 pm		at UC Davis	L 52–66	8–12 (2–5)	15 – Nwaba	6 – Nwaba	4 – Shead	The Pavilion (1,637); Davis, CA
Feb. 3; 7:00 pm		UC Irvine	L 72–78 ^{OT}	8–13 (2–6)	11 – Shipley/Sutlive	7 – Shead	4 – Shipley	Mott Athletic Center (1,877); San Luis Obispo, CA
Feb. 6; 7:00 pm, ESPNU		Hawaii	L 60–75	8–14 (2–7)	10 – Morgan	6 – Morgan	5 – Shead	Mott Athletic Center (3,032); San Luis Obispo, CA
Feb. 11; 10:00 pm, ESPN3		at Long Beach State	L 70–73	8–15 (2–8)	24 – Nwaba	13 – Nwaba	5 – Nwaba	Walter Pyramid (2,627); Long Beach, CA
Feb. 13; 7:30 pm, Prime Ticket		at UC Riverside	W 86–78	9–15 (3–8)	25 – Johns	10 – Johns	6 – Bland	SRC Center; Riverside, CA
Feb. 18; 7:00 pm		UC Davis	W 58–53	10–15 (4–8)	15 – Morgan	10 – Martin	4 – Shead	Mott Athletic Center; San Luis Obispo, CA
Feb. 20; 7:00 pm		Cal State Northridge	L 71–75	10–16 (4–9)	23 – Morgan	10 – Martin	7 – Shead	Mott Athletic Center; San Luis Obispo, CA
Feb. 25; 7:00 pm		Cal State Fullerton	L 77–78	10–17 (4–10)	22 – Morgan	4 – Nwaba	3 – Nwaba	Mott Athletic Center (2,455); San Luis Obispo, CA
Mar. 3; 8:30 pm, ESPN3		at UC Irvine	L 62–72	10–18 (4–11)	25 – Nwaba	10 – Nwaba	3 – Nwaba	Bren Events Center (3,004); Irvine, CA
Mar. 5; 4:00 pm		at UC Santa Barbara	L 50–69	10–19 (4–12)	15 – Nwaba	9 – Nwaba	2 – Meikle	UC Santa Barbara Events Center (4,387); Santa Barbara, CA
Big West tournament
Mar. 10; 6:00 pm	(7)	vs. (2) UC Irvine; Quarterfinals	L 64–84	10–20	19 – Meikle	7 – Nwaba	4 – Shipley	Honda Center; Anaheim, CA
*Non-conference game. ^{#}Rankings from AP Poll. (#) Tournament seedings in parentheses. All times are in Pacific Time.

== See also ==
- 2015–16 Cal Poly Mustangs women's basketball team
