= 2015–16 Cal State Fullerton Titans men's basketball team =

American college basketball season

2015–16 Cal State Fullerton Titans men's basketball
- Conference: Big West Conference
- Record: 10–20 (3–13 Big West)
- Head coach: Dedrique Taylor (3rd season)
- Assistant coaches: John Smith; Robert Spence; Danny Sprinkle
- Home arena: Titan Gym

2015–16 Big West men's basketball standings
	Conf.				Overall
Team	W		L	PCT	W		L	PCT
Hawai'i †	13	–	3	.813	28	–	6	.824
UC Irvine	13	–	3	.813	28	–	10	.737
Long Beach State	12	–	4	.750	20	–	15	.571
UC Santa Barbara	11	–	5	.688	19	–	14	.576
UC Davis	6	–	10	.375	11	–	19	.367
UC Riverside	5	–	11	.313	14	–	19	.424
Cal State Northridge*	5	–	11	.313	10	–	20	.333
Cal Poly	4	–	12	.250	10	–	20	.333
Cal State Fullerton	3	–	13	.188	10	–	20	.333
† 2016 Big West tournament winner *ineligible for postseason due to self-imposed ban due to academic fraud violations

The 2015–16 Cal State Fullerton Titans men's basketball team represented California State University, Fullerton during the 2015–16 NCAA Division I men's basketball season. The Titans, led by third year head coach Dedrique Taylor, played their home games at Titan Gym as members of the Big West Conference. They finished the season 10–20, 3–13 in Big West play to finish in last place. They lost in the quarterfinals of the Big West tournament to Hawaii.

== Roster ==
2015–16 Cal State Fullerton Titans men's basketball team
Players
Coaches

Pos.	#	Name	Height	Weight	Year	Previous school	Hometown
G	0	Kyle Allman Jr.	6 ft 3 in (1.91 m)	170 lb (77 kg)	Fr	HSCTEA	Brooklyn NY
G	1	Tre Coggins	6 ft 2 in (1.88 m)	185 lb (84 kg)	Jr	JSerra Catholic HS; Air Force	San Juan Capistrano, CA
G	2	Lionheart Leslie	5 ft 10 in (1.78 m)	165 lb (75 kg)	Jr	Vanderbilt HS; Blinn JC	Houma, Louisiana
F	3	Tim Myles	6 ft 6 in (1.98 m)	230 lb (104 kg)	Jr	Etiwanda HS; Chaffey College	Rancho Cucamonga, California
G	5	Malcolm Henderson	6 ft 8 in (2.03 m)	250 lb (113 kg)	RS Sr	Vanier College; Missouri State West Plains JC	Montreal, Quebec, Canada
G	10	Lanerryl Johnson	6 ft 1 in (1.85 m)	165 lb (75 kg)	RS Sr	Walton HS; Central Arizona JC	Atlanta, GA
G	11	Malcolm Brooks	6 ft 5 in (1.96 m)	185 lb (84 kg)	RS Sr	Benjamin Cardozo HS; Lamar CC; Pepperdine	Brooklyn, NY
G	12	Jamal Smith	6 ft 3 in (1.91 m)	170 lb (77 kg)	Fr	Rancho Verde HS	Moreno Valley, CA
F	14	Khalil Ahmad (basketball)	6 ft 4 in (1.93 m)	185 lb (84 kg)	Fr	Centennial HS	Corona, CA
F	15	Jamar Akoh	6 ft 7 in (2.01 m)	240 lb (109 kg)	So	Los Osos HS	Rancho Cucamonga, CA
G	22	Sheldon Blackwell	6 ft 5 in (1.96 m)	175 lb (79 kg)	Jr	Etiwanda HS	Rancho Cucamonga, CA
F	23	Rashard Todd	6 ft 7 in (2.01 m)	200 lb (91 kg)	RS Jr	Our Lady of Mount Carmel HS; Jacksonville College; N.M.M.I	Baltimore, MD
G	24	Keilan Horton	6 ft 0 in (1.83 m)	180 lb (82 kg)	Jr	Culver City HS; Santa Monica College	Los Angeles, CA
C	33	Kennedy Esume	6 ft 10 in (2.08 m)	245 lb (111 kg)	Sr	Luminary School; College of Southern Idaho	Umuaja, Nigeria

Head coach

- Dedrique Taylor (UC Davis)

Assistant coach(es)

- John Smith (Dominican (CA))
- Danny Sprinkle (Montana State)
- Robert Spence (Guilford)

Legend

- (C) Team captain
- (S) Suspended
- (I) Ineligible
- (W) Walk-on
- Injured
- Current redshirt

Roster
Last update: 11/27/15

== Schedule and results ==
Date time, TV	Rank^{#}	Opponent^{#}	Result	Record	Site (attendance) city, state
Exhibition
11/06/2015*; 5:30 pm		Bethesda University	W 106–66		Titan Gym (689); Fullerton, CA
Regular season
11/13/2015*; 7:00 pm		at Loyola Marymount	L 74–79	0–1	Gersten Pavilion (2,761); Los Angeles, CA
11/17/2015*; 7:00 pm		at Pacific	W 77–76	1–1	Alex G. Spanos Center (1,913); Stockton, CA
11/21/2015*; 3:00 pm		San Diego	W 67–55	2–1	Titan Gym (851); Fullerton, CA
11/24/2015*; 3:00 pm		at Southern Utah	W 80–66	3–1	Centrum Arena (851); Cedar City, UT
11/28/2015*; 6:00 pm		Nevada	W 75–66	4–1	Titan Gym (905); Fullerton, CA
12/01/2015*; 7:00 pm		Cal State Dominguez Hills	W 88–56	5–1	Titan Gym (608); Fullerton, CA
12/04/2015*; 7:00 pm		at Seattle	W 70–61	6–1	KeyArena (1,213); Seattle, WA
12/06/2015*; 6:00 pm, P12N		at Washington	L 69–87	6–2	Alaska Airlines Arena (5,821); Seattle, WA
12/12/2015*; 6:00 pm		Loyola Marymount	L 70–82	6–3	Titan Gym (778); Fullerton, CA
12/18/2015*; 8:00 pm, P12N		vs. Oregon State; Far West Classic	L 69–82	6–4	Moda Center (8,032); Portland, OR
12/19/2015*; 5:30 pm		vs. Portland; Far West Classic	L 60–65	6–5	Moda Center (4,371); Portland, OR
12/29/2015*; 7:00 pm		at Portland State	L 82–89	6–6	Stott Center (426); Portland, OR
01/02/2016*; 7:00 om		Cal State East Bay	W 75–52	7–6	Titan Gym (588); Fullerton, CA
01/07/2016; 8:00 pm, ESPN3		at UC Riverside	W 79–73	8–6 (1–0)	The SRC (818); Riverside, CA
01/09/2016; 6:00 pm		Cal State Northridge	L 75–85	8–7 (1–1)	Titan Gym (677); Fullerton, CA
01/16/2016; 6:00 pm, ESPN3		Hawaii	L 79–86	8–8 (1–2)	Titan Gym (993); Fullerton, CA
01/20/2016; 7:30 pm, Prime Ticket		at UC Irvine	L 59–72	8–9 (1–3)	Bren Events Center (2,211); Irvine, CA
01/23/2016; 4:00 pm, ESPN3		Cal Poly	L 75–83	8–10 (1–4)	Titan Gym (892); Fullerton, CA
01/27/2016; 7:00 pm		at UC Davis	L 64–69	8–11 (1–5)	The Pavilion (905); Davis, CA
01/30/2016; 7:00 pm		UC Riverside	L 71–87	8–12 (1–6)	Titan Gym (3,489); Fullerton, CA
02/04/2016; 7:00 pm, ESPN3		UC Davis	W 61–57	9–12 (2–6)	Titan Gym (953); Fullerton, CA
02/06/2016; 7:00 pm		at UC Santa Barbara	L 68–81	9–13 (2–7)	UCSB Events Center (1,726); Santa Barbara, CA
02/10/2016; 7:00 pm, ESPN3		at Cal State Northridge; Matador Pride T/Sport Chalet Mystery Cards	L 67–75	9–14 (2–8)	Matadome (1,127); Northridge, CA
02/13/2016; 9:00 pm		at Hawaii	L 59–76	9–15 (2–9)	Stan Sheriff Center (8,401); Honolulu, HI
02/17/2016; 7:00 pm, ESPN3		UC Irvine	L 77–96	9–16 (2–10)	Titan Gym (1,209); Fullerton, CA
02/20/2016; 7:30 pm		at Long Beach State	L 57–70	9–17 (2–11)	Walter Pyramid (3,519); Long Beach, CA
02/25/2016; 7:00 pm		at Cal Poly; Senior Night	W 78–77	10–17 (3–11)	Mott Gym (2,455); San Luis Obispo, CA
02/27/2016; 6:00 pm		UC Santa Barbara	L 62–80	10–18 (3–12)	Titan Gym (928); Fullerton, CA
03/02/16; 7:00 pm		Long Beach State	L 73–75	10–19 (3–13)	Titan Gym (1,130); Fullerton, CA
Big West tournament
03/10/16; 12:00 pm, Prime Ticket	(8)	vs. (1) Hawaii; Quarterfinals	L 44–75	10–20	Honda Center; Anaheim, CA
*Non-conference game. ^{#}Rankings from AP Poll. (#) Tournament seedings in parentheses. All times are in Pacific Time.
