= 2015–16 UC Irvine Anteaters men's basketball team =

American college basketball season

2015–16 UC Irvine Anteaters men's basketball

Big West regular season co-champion Don Haskins Sun Bowl Invitational champion

CIT, Runner-up
- Conference: Big West Conference
- Record: 28–10 (13–3 Big West)
- Head coach: Russell Turner (6th season)
- Assistant coaches: Ali Ton; Ryan Badrtalei; Nick Booker
- Home arena: Bren Events Center

2015–16 Big West men's basketball standings
	Conf.				Overall
Team	W		L	PCT	W		L	PCT
Hawai'i †	13	–	3	.813	28	–	6	.824
UC Irvine	13	–	3	.813	28	–	10	.737
Long Beach State	12	–	4	.750	20	–	15	.571
UC Santa Barbara	11	–	5	.688	19	–	14	.576
UC Davis	6	–	10	.375	11	–	19	.367
UC Riverside	5	–	11	.313	14	–	19	.424
Cal State Northridge*	5	–	11	.313	10	–	20	.333
Cal Poly	4	–	12	.250	10	–	20	.333
Cal State Fullerton	3	–	13	.188	10	–	20	.333
† 2016 Big West tournament winner *ineligible for postseason due to self-imposed ban due to academic fraud violations

The 2015–16 UC Irvine Anteaters men's basketball team represented the University of California, Irvine during the 2015–16 NCAA Division I men's basketball season. The Anteaters were led by sixth year head coach Russell Turner and played their home games at the Bren Events Center. They are members of the Big West Conference. They finished the season 28–10, 13–3 in Big West play to win a share of the regular season Big West championship. They defeated Cal Poly in the quarterfinals of the Big West tournament to advance to the semifinals where they lost to Long Beach State. They were invited to the CollegeInsider.com Tournament where they defeated North Dakota, Louisiana–Lafayette, and Coastal Carolina to advance to the championship game where they lost to Columbia. This season, UC Irvine set the new season record in wins with 28, surpassing the previous mark of 25. They also set the records for most true road wins with 13, and most conference wins with 13. Alex Young became the first player in school history to record career 1,000 points, 500 assists, and 500 rebounds. Mamadou N'Diaye broke the school record in career blocked shots with 218.

== Off-Season ==
=== 2015 Recruiting Class ===
College recruiting information
Name	Hometown	School	Height	Weight	Commit date
Brandon Smith; SF	Santa Ana, CA	Godinez Fundamental High School	6 ft 6 in (1.98 m)	175 lb (79 kg)	Jul 7, 2014
Brandon Smith; SF	Recruit ratings: Rivals: ESPN: (75)				
Justin Wertner; SG	Collierville, TN	Saint George Academy	6 ft 5 in (1.96 m)	190 lb (86 kg)	Aug 4, 2014
Justin Wertner; SG	Recruit ratings: 247Sports: ESPN: (75)				
Max Hazzard; PG	Los Angeles, CA	Loyola High School	5 ft 11 in (1.80 m)	155 lb (70 kg)	Oct 7, 2014
Max Hazzard; PG	Recruit ratings: Scout: Rivals: 247Sports: ESPN: (69)				
Darrian Traylor; SG	Las Vegas, NV	Centennial High School	6 ft 3 in (1.91 m)	175 lb (79 kg)	Jul 14, 2014
Darrian Traylor; SG	Recruit ratings: Scout: Rivals: 247Sports: ESPN: (64)				
Overall recruit ranking: Scout: n/a Rivals: n/a ESPN: n/a
Note: In many cases, Scout, Rivals, 247Sports, On3, and ESPN may conflict in their listings of height and weight.; In these cases, the average was taken. ESPN grades are on a 100-point scale.; Sources: "ESPN - UC Irvine Basketball Recruiting 2015". ESPN.; "2015 Team Ranking". Rivals.

== Roster ==
2015–16 UC Irvine Anteaters men's basketball team
Players
Coaches

Pos.	#	Name	Height	Weight	Year	Hometown
C	33	Mike Best	6 ft 10 in (2.08 m)	205 lb (93 kg)	Sr	San Rafael, California
G	3	Haitham Chehabi	6 ft 1 in (1.85 m)	187 lb (85 kg)	Fr	Laguna Beach, California
F/C	12	Ioannis Dimakopoulos	7 ft 2 in (2.18 m)	255 lb (116 kg)	Jr	Patras, Greece
G	24	Dominique Dunning	6 ft 3 in (1.91 m)	213 lb (97 kg)	Sr	Corona, California
F	5	Jonathan Galloway	6 ft 10 in (2.08 m)	215 lb (98 kg)	RS Fr	Brentwood, California
G	2	Max Hazzard (redshirt)	5 ft 10 in (1.78 m)	165 lb (75 kg)	Fr	Los Angeles, California
G	0	Jaron Martin	5 ft 10 in (1.78 m)	160 lb (73 kg)	Jr	Sunland, California
C	34	Mamadou N'Diaye	7 ft 6 in (2.29 m)	290 lb (132 kg)	Jr	Dakar, Sengal
G	10	Luke Nelson	6 ft 3 in (1.91 m)	182 lb (83 kg)	Jr	Worthing, England
F	20	Shawn Rey	6 ft 8 in (2.03 m)	232 lb (105 kg)	Sr	Torrance, California
G	25	Spencer Rivers	6 ft 2 in (1.88 m)	190 lb (86 kg)	RS Fr	Winter Park, Florida
G	11	Haroldas Saprykinas	6 ft 3 in (1.91 m)	170 lb (77 kg)	So	Klaipėda, Lithuania
F	13	Brandon Smith	6 ft 5 in (1.96 m)	185 lb (84 kg)	Fr	Santa Ana, California
G	23	Darrian Traylor (redshirt)	6 ft 4 in (1.93 m)	210 lb (95 kg)	Fr	Las Vegas, Nevada
G	32	Aaron Wright	6 ft 3 in (1.91 m)	188 lb (85 kg)	Sr	Cerritos, California
G	1	Alex Young	6 ft 1 in (1.85 m)	176 lb (80 kg)	Sr	Phoenix, Oregon

Head coach

- Russell Turner (Hampden–Sydney)

Assistant coach(es)

- Ali Ton (Davidson)
- Ryan Badtalei (UCLA)
- Nick Booker (Davidson)

Legend

- (C) Team captain
- (S) Suspended
- (I) Ineligible
- (W) Walk-on
- Injured
- Current redshirt

Roster

== Schedule ==
Date time, TV	Rank^{#}	Opponent^{#}	Result	Record	Site (attendance) city, state
Exhibition
11/07/2015*; 7:00 pm, Big West TV		Vanguard	W 83–59		Bren Events Center (2,411); Irvine, CA
Non-conference regular season
11/13/2015*; 7:00 pm, Big West TV		UC San Diego	W 89–73	1–0	Bren Events Center (2,969); Irvine, CA
11/15/2015*; 5:00 pm, KDOC Big West TV		Loyola Marymount	W 77–53	2–0	Bren Events Center (2,077); Irvine, CA
11/18/2015*; 4:00 pm, ESPN3		at UCF	W 61–60 ^{OT}	3–0	CFE Arena (5,629); Orlando, FL
11/23/2015*; 7:00 pm, Big West TV		Santa Clara; Wooden Legacy Non-bracketed round	W 79–61	4–0	Bren Events Center (2,359); Irvine, CA
11/26/2015*; 1:00 pm, ESPNU		vs. Boise State; Wooden Legacy Quarterfinals	L 64–71	4–1	Titan Gym (2,341); Fullerton, CA
11/27/2015*; 12:00 pm, ESPN3		vs. Boston College; Wooden Legacy Consolation round	W 80–67	5–1	Titan Gym (3,173); Fullerton, CA
11/29/2015*; 11:30 am, ESPNU		vs. Evansville; Wooden Legacy 5th place Game	L 56–75	5–2	Honda Center (4,393); Anaheim, CA
12/04/2015*; 7:00 pm, W.TV		at Pacific	W 70–67	6–2	Alex G. Spanos Center (2,111); Stockton, CA
12/06/2015*; 4:00 pm, CHN W.TV		at Saint Mary's	L 60–70	6–3	McKeon Pavilion (2,333); Moraga, CA
12/12/2015*; 6:00 pm, Root		at Utah State	W 73–63	7–3	Dee Glen Smith Spectrum (8,857); Logan, UT
12/15/2015*; 8:00 pm, P12N		at Oregon	L 63–78	7–4	Matthew Knight Arena (5,863); Eugene, OR
12/18/2015*; 7:00 pm, Big West TV		Chapman	W 65–51	8–4	Bren Events Center (1,721); Irvine, CA
12/21/2015*; 4:00 pm		vs. Sam Houston State; Don Haskins Sun Bowl Invitational Semifinals	W 63–53	9–4	Don Haskins Center (7,746); El Paso, TX
12/22/2015*; 6:00 pm		vs. Norfolk State; Don Haskins Sun Bowl Invitational Championship	W 80–62	10–4	Don Haskins Center (5,946); El Paso, TX
12/29/2015*; 6:00 pm, ESPNU		at No. 2 Kansas	L 53–78	10–5	Allen Fieldhouse (16,300); Lawrence KS
01/02/2016*; 7:30 pm, KDOC Big West TV		New Mexico State	W 54–52	11–5	Bren Events Center (2,866); Irvine, CA
Big West regular season
01/07/2016; 7:30 pm, Prime Ticket		UC Davis	W 76–55	12–5 (1–0)	Bren Events Center (2,831); Irvine, CA
01/09/2016; 8:00 pm, ESPNU		UC Riverside	W 84–68	13–5 (2–0)	Bren Events Center (4,233); Irvine, CA
01/14/2016; 7:30 pm, Prime Ticket		at Long Beach State	W 58–54	14–5 (3–0)	Walter Pyramid (3,713); Long Beach, CA
01/16/2016; 4:00 pm, Big West TV		at UC Santa Barbara	W 61–52	15–5 (4–0)	The Thunderdome (3,527); Santa Barbara, CA
01/20/2016; 7:30 pm, Prime Ticket		Cal State Fullerton	W 72–59	16–5 (5–0)	Bren Events Center (2,211); Irvine, CA
01/27/2016; 7:00 pm, ESPN3		at Cal State Northridge	W 73–63	17–5 (6–0)	Matadome (2,157); Northridge, CA
01/30/2016; 7:00 pm, ESPNU		UC Santa Barbara; Homecoming	L 60–76	17–6 (6–1)	Bren Events Center (5,000); Irvine, CA
02/03/2016; 7:00 pm, Big West TV		at Cal Poly	W 78–72 ^{OT}	18–6 (7–1)	Mott Gym (1,877); San Luis Obispo, CA
02/11/2016; 10:00 pm, OC Sports Big West TV		at Hawaii	L 52–74	18–7 (7–2)	Stan Sheriff Center (9,826); Honolulu, HI
02/13/2016; 7:00 pm, ESPN3		Cal State Northridge	W 93–84	19–7 (8–2)	Bren Events Center (2,486); Irvine, CA
02/17/2016; 7:00 pm, ESPN3		at Cal State Fullerton	W 96–77	20–7 (9–2)	Titan Gym (1,209); Fullerton, CA
02/20/2016; 8:30 pm, ESPNU		Hawaii	L 71–75	20–8 (9–3)	Bren Events Center (4,312); Irvine, CA
02/24/2016; 7:00 pm, ESPN3		Long Beach State	W 90–67	21–8 (10–3)	Bren Events Center (2,654); Irvine, CA
02/27/2016; 9:00 pm, ESPN2		at UC Davis	W 62–61	22–8 (11–3)	The Pavilion (4,573); Davis, CA
03/03/2016; 8:30 pm, ESPN3		Cal Poly	W 72–62	23–8 (12–3)	Bren Events Center (3,004); Irvine, CA
03/05/2016; 2:00 pm, Big West TV		at UC Riverside	W 76–66	24–8 (13–3)	The SRC (766); Riverside, CA
Big West tournament
03/10/2016; 6:00 pm, Prime Ticket	(2)	vs. (7) Cal Poly; Quarterfinals	W 84–64	25–8	Honda Center; Anaheim, CA
03/11/2016; 9:00 pm, ESPNU	(2)	vs. (3) Long Beach State; Semifinals	L 72–77	25–9	Honda Center; Anaheim, CA
CIT
03/16/2016*; 5:00 pm, Midco SN/SideArm Sports/Big Sky TV		at North Dakota; First round	W 89–86 ^{OT}	26–9	Betty Engelstad Sioux Center (1,263); Grand Forks, ND
03/23/2016*; 5:15 pm, Side Arm Sports		at Louisiana–Lafayette; Quarterfinals	W 67–66	27–9	Cajundome (1,901); Lafayette, LA
03/27/2016*; 6:00 pm, CBSSN		at Coastal Carolina; Semifinals	W 66–47	28–9	HTC Center (1,204); Conway, SC
03/29/2016*; 4:00 pm, CBSSN		at Columbia; Championship game	L 67–73	28–10	Levien Gymnasium (2,603); New York City, NY
*Non-conference game. ^{#}Rankings from AP Poll. (#) Tournament seedings in parentheses. All times are in Pacific Time.
