= 2015–16 Cal State Northridge Matadors men's basketball team =

American college basketball season

2015–16 Cal State Northridge Matadors men's basketball
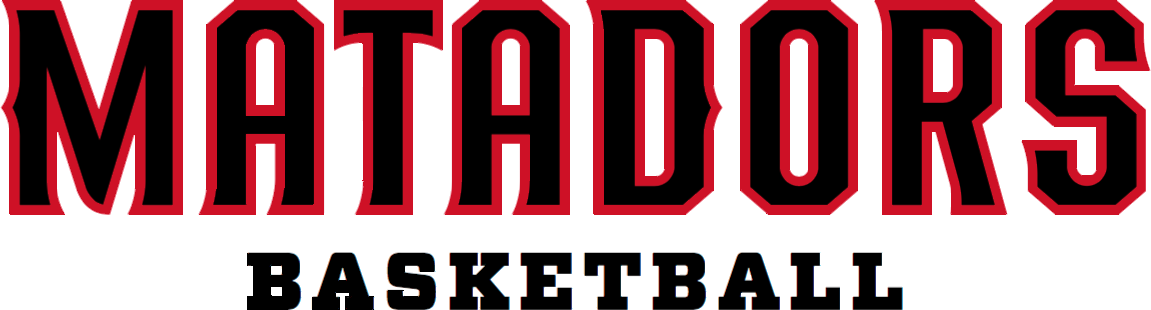
- Conference: Big West Conference
- Record: 10–20 (5–11 Big West)
- Head coach: Reggie Theus (3rd season)
- Assistant coaches: Jason Levy; Chris Pompey; Jeff Theiler
- Home arena: Matadome

2015–16 Big West men's basketball standings
| | Conf. | | | | Overall |
| Team | W | | L | PCT | W | | L | PCT |
|---|---|---|---|---|---|---|---|---|
| Hawai'i † | 13 | – | 3 | .813 | 28 | – | 6 | .824 |
| UC Irvine | 13 | – | 3 | .813 | 28 | – | 10 | .737 |
| Long Beach State | 12 | – | 4 | .750 | 20 | – | 15 | .571 |
| UC Santa Barbara | 11 | – | 5 | .688 | 19 | – | 14 | .576 |
| UC Davis | 6 | – | 10 | .375 | 11 | – | 19 | .367 |
| UC Riverside | 5 | – | 11 | .313 | 14 | – | 19 | .424 |
| Cal State Northridge* | 5 | – | 11 | .313 | 10 | – | 20 | .333 |
| Cal Poly | 4 | – | 12 | .250 | 10 | – | 20 | .333 |
| Cal State Fullerton | 3 | – | 13 | .188 | 10 | – | 20 | .333 |
† 2016 Big West tournament winner *ineligible for postseason due to self-imposed ban due to academic fraud violations

The 2015–16 Cal State Northridge Matadors men's basketball team represented California State University, Northridge (also known as CSUN) during the 2015–16 NCAA Division I men's basketball season. The Matadors, led by third year head coach Reggie Theus, played their home games at the Matadome as members of the Big West Conference. On January 7, 2016, CSUN announced a self-imposed postseason ban due to academic fraud violations. They postseason ban included the Big West tournament. They finished the season, 10–20, 5–11 in Big West play to finish in a tie for sixth place.

== Roster ==
2015–16 Cal State Northridge Matadors men's basketball team
Players
Coaches

| Pos. | # | Name | Height | Weight | Year | Previous school | Hometown |
|---|---|---|---|---|---|---|---|
| G | 0 | Kendall Smith | 6 ft 3 in (1.91 m) | 177 lb (80 kg) | Jr | Deer Valley HS; UNLV | Antioch, CA |
| G | 1 | Micheal Warren | 6 ft 5 in (1.96 m) | 180 lb (82 kg) | So | Theodore Roosevelt HS | Washington, D.C. |
| G | 2 | Landon Drew | 6 ft 1 in (1.85 m) | 182 lb (83 kg) | Sr | Fairfax HS | Los Angeles, CA |
| G | 3 | Darin Johnson (I) (redshirt) | 6 ft 5 in (1.96 m) | 191 lb (87 kg) | Jr | Sheldon HS; Washington | Sacramento, CA |
| F | 4 | Tavrion Dawson | 6 ft 8 in (2.03 m) | 202 lb (92 kg) | So | Gardena Serra HS | Long Beach, CA |
| F | 5 | Zacarry Douglas | 6 ft 8 in (2.03 m) | 205 lb (93 kg) | So | Mt. Zion Prep | Landover, MD |
| G | 10 | Jason Richardson | 6 ft 2 in (1.88 m) | 210 lb (95 kg) | Fr | Junípero Serra HS | Hawthorne, CA |
| F/C | 11 | Tre Hale-Edmerson | 6 ft 9 in (2.06 m) | 211 lb (96 kg) | Sr | Stoneridge Prep | Sheridan, OR |
| F/C | 12 | Olalekan Ajayi | 6 ft 11 in (2.11 m) | 245 lb (111 kg) | RS Sr | Quality Education Academy; Eastern Michigan | Lagos, Nigeria |
| G | 13 | Kelton Conway (W) | 5 ft 11 in (1.8 m) | 176 lb (80 kg) | Fr | El Camino Real HS | Woodland Hills, CA |
| G | 14 | Aaron Parks | 6 ft 3 in (1.91 m) | 210 lb (95 kg) | Jr | Lake Clifton HS | Baltimore, MD |
| G | 22 | Mehran Nazarian (W) | 6 ft 3 in (1.91 m) | 185 lb (84 kg) | Fr | North HS | Hawthorne, CA |
| G | 23 | Jerron Wilbut | 6 ft 3 in (1.91 m) | 180 lb (82 kg) | So | Downers Grove South HS | Chicago, IL |
| F | 24 | Reggie Theus, Jr. (I) (redshirt) | 6 ft 6 in (1.98 m) | 217 lb (98 kg) | So | Fairfax HS; South Carolina | Los Angeles, CA |
| F | 25 | Rakim Lubin (I) (redshirt) | 6 ft 8 in (2.03 m) | 257 lb (117 kg) | So | Buford HS; Connecticut | Miami, FL |
| C | 45 | Dylan Johns (I) (redshirt) | 6 ft 11 in (2.11 m) | 240 lb (109 kg) | Jr | Copleston HS; Texas A&M | Ipswich, England |
| C | 54 | Blair Orr (I) (redshirt) | 6 ft 8 in (2.03 m) | 252 lb (114 kg) | So | El Camino Real HS; Winnipeg | Camarillo, CA |

Head coach

- Reggie Theus (UNLV)

Assistant coach(es)

- Jason Levy (Cal State Northridge)
- Chris Pompey (Pittsburgh)
- Jeff Theiler (La Verne)

Legend

- (C) Team captain
- (S) Suspended
- (I) Ineligible
- (W) Walk-on
- Injured
- Current redshirt

Roster

== Schedule and results ==
| Date time, TV | Opponent | Result | Record | Site (attendance) city, state |
Exhibition
| 11/05/2015*; 7:00 pm | Cal State Los Angeles | W 54–50 | | Matadome; Northridge, CA |
Non-conference regular season
| 11/13/2015*; 5:00 pm, ESPN3 | at Northern Illinois; NIU Showcase | L 71–83 | 0–1 | Convocation Center (995); DeKalb, IL |
| 11/14/2015*; 4:00 pm | vs. Wright State; NIU Showcase | W 72–67 | 1–1 | Convocation Center (913); DeKalb, IL |
| 11/15/2015*; 11:00 am | at South Dakota; NIU Showcase | L 72–76 | 1–2 | Convocation Center (888); DeKalb, IL |
| 11/18/2015*; 7:00 pm, BigWest.TV | Vanguard (CA) | W 72–52 | 2–2 | Matadome (1,317); Northridge, CA |
| 11/23/2015*; 6:00 pm, P12N | at USC | L 61–96 | 2–3 | Galen Center (1,317); Los Angeles, CA |
| 11/25/2015*; 6:00 pm | at Loyola Marymount | L 80–82 ^{OT} | 2–4 | Gersten Pavilion (1,951); Los Angeles, CA |
| 11/29/2015*; 4:00 pm, P12N | at UCLA | L 45–77 | 2–5 | Pauley Pavilion (6,193); Los Angeles, CA |
| 12/05/2015*; 7:00 pm, BigWest.TV | Pepperdine | L 55–70 | 2–6 | Matadome (1,078); Northridge, CA |
| 12/07/2015*; 7:00 pm | at San Francisco | L 61–65 | 2–7 | War Memorial Gymnasium (1,138); San Francisco, CA |
| 12/17/2015*; 7:00 pm | at Portland State | W 77–71 | 3–7 | Peter Stott Center (412); Portland, OR |
| 12/20/2015*; 5:00 pm, BigWest.TV | Bethesda University | W 79–49 | 4–7 | Matadome (613); Northridge, CA |
| 12/23/2015*; 7:00 pm | at San Diego | L 63–82 | 4–8 | Jenny Craig Pavilion (1,634); San Diego, CA |
| 12/29/2015*; 6:00 pm | at Idaho State | L 78–83 | 4–9 | Reed Gym (1,446); Pocatello, ID |
| 01/02/2016*; 7:30 pm, BigWest.TV | Morgan State | W 88–74 | 5–9 | Matadome (876); Northridge, CA |
Big West regular season
| 01/06/2016; 7:00 pm, ESPN3 | Long Beach State | L 79–94 | 5–10 (0–1) | Matadome (704); Northridge, CA |
| 01/09/2016; 6:00 pm | at Cal State Fullerton | W 85–75 | 6–10 (1–1) | Titan Gym (677); Fullerton, CA |
| 01/14/2016; 7:30 pm | at UC Davis | L 62–63 | 6–11 (1–2) | The Pavilion (2,498); Davis, CA |
| 01/16/2016; 7:30 pm, BigWest.TV | UC Riverside | L 72–75 | 6–12 (1–3) | Matadome (1,103); Northridge, CA |
| 01/21/2016; 7:00 pm, ESPN3 | Cal Poly | W 76–74 | 7–12 (2–3) | Matadome (867); Northridge, CA |
| 01/23/2016; 4:00 pm | at UC Santa Barbara | L 61–74 | 7–13 (2–4) | The Thunderdome (1,693); Santa Barbara, CA |
| 01/27/2016; 7:00 pm, ESPN3 | UC Irvine | L 63–73 | 7–14 (2–5) | Matadome (2,157); Northridge, CA |
| 02/03/2016; 7:00 pm, ESPN3 | at UC Riverside | W 73–71 | 8–14 (3–5) | UC Riverside Student Recreation Center (884); Riverside, CA |
| 02/06/2016; 4:00 pm, ESPNU/ESPN3 | at Long Beach State | L 76–81 | 8–15 (3–6) | Walter Pyramid (2,538); Long Beach, CA |
| 02/10/2016; 7:00 pm, ESPN3 | Cal State Fullerton | W 75–67 | 9–15 (4–6) | Matadome (1,127); Northridge, CA |
| 02/13/2016; 7:00 pm, ESPN3 | at UC Irvine | L 84–93 | 9–16 (4–7) | Bren Events Center (2,486); Irvine, CA |
| 02/18/2016; 7:00 pm, ESPN3 | Hawaii | L 63–69 | 9–17 (4–8) | Matadome (1,683); Northridge, CA |
| 02/20/2016; 7:00 pm, ESPNU | at Cal Poly | W 75–71 | 10–17 (5–8) | Mott Athletic Center (2,216); San Luis Obispo, CA |
| 02/25/2016; 7:30 pm, Prime Ticket | UC Santa Barbara | L 63–78 | 10–18 (5–9) | Matadome (1,290); Northridge, CA |
| 02/27/2016; 7:00 pm, ESPN2 | at Hawaii | L 78–89 | 10–19 (5–10) | Stan Sheriff Center (10,300); Honolulu, HI |
| 03/05/2016; 7:30 pm, ESPN3 | UC Davis | L 83–87 | 10–20 (5–11) | Matadome (769); Northridge, CA |
*Non-conference game. ^{#}Rankings from AP Poll. (#) Tournament seedings in parentheses. All times are in Pacific Time.
