= 2015–16 San Diego State Aztecs men's basketball team =

American college basketball season

2015–16 San Diego State Aztecs men's basketball

Mountain West regular season champions

NIT, Semifinals
- Conference: Mountain West Conference
- Record: 28–10 (16–2 Mountain West)
- Head coach: Steve Fisher (17th season)
- Associate head coach: Brian Dutcher
- Assistant coaches: Justin Hutson; Dave Velasquez
- Home arena: Viejas Arena

2015–16 Mountain West Conference men's basketball standings
	Conf.				Overall
Team	W		L	PCT	W		L	PCT
San Diego State	16	–	2	.889	28	–	10	.737
Fresno State †	13	–	5	.722	25	–	10	.714
Boise State	11	–	7	.611	20	–	12	.625
Nevada	10	–	8	.556	24	–	14	.632
New Mexico	10	–	8	.556	17	–	15	.531
Colorado State	8	–	10	.444	18	–	16	.529
UNLV	8	–	10	.444	18	–	15	.545
Utah State	7	–	11	.389	16	–	15	.516
Wyoming	7	–	11	.389	14	–	18	.438
Air Force	5	–	13	.278	14	–	18	.438
San Jose State	4	–	14	.222	9	–	22	.290
† Conference tournament winner

The 2015–16 San Diego State men's basketball team represented San Diego State University during the 2015–16 NCAA Division I men's basketball season. This was head coach Steve Fisher's seventeenth season at San Diego State. The Aztecs played their home games at Viejas Arena. They were members in the Mountain West Conference. They finished the season 28–10, 16–2 in Mountain West play to win the Mountain West regular season championship. They defeated Utah State and Nevada to advance to the championship game of the Mountain West tournament where they lost to Fresno State. As a regular season conference champion who failed to win their conference tournament, received an automatic bid to the National Invitation Tournament where they defeated IPFW, Washington, and Georgia Tech to advance to the semifinals where they lost to George Washington.

== Previous season ==
The 2014–15 San Diego State Aztecs finished the season with an overall record of 27–9, and 14–4 in Mountain West play to finish in a tie for the Mountain West regular season championship with Boise State. They advanced to the championship game of the Mountain West tournament where they lost to Wyoming. They received an at-large bid to the NCAA tournament as an 8-seed in the South Region, where they defeated St. John's in the second round before losing in the Round of 32 to Duke.

== Departures ==
Name	Number	Pos.	Height	Weight	Year	Hometown	Notes
Kevin Zabo	2	G	6'2"	185	Freshman	Gatineau, QE	Transferred to Indian Hills CC
Dwayne Polee II	5	F	6'7"	200	RS Senior	Los Angeles, CA	Graduated
Aqeel Quinn	10	G	6'3"	200	RS Senior	Gardena, CA	Graduated
J. J. O'Brien	20	F	6'7"	215	RS Senior	Rancho Cucamonga, CA	Graduated
Ryan Staten	24	G	6'2"	185	Senior	San Pablo, CA	Graduated

== 2015 recruiting class ==
In addition to two high school recruits, San Diego State received a commitment from Indiana transfer Max Hoetzel. The sophomore wing will sit out the 2015–16 season, after which he will have three years of remaining eligibility.

College recruiting information
Name	Hometown	School	Height	Weight	Commit date
Jeremy Hemsley #20 SG	La Verne, CA	Damien High School	6 ft 4 in (1.93 m)	190 lb (86 kg)	May 29, 2014
Jeremy Hemsley #20 SG	Recruit ratings: Scout: Rivals: 247Sports: ESPN:				
Overall recruit ranking:
Note: In many cases, Scout, Rivals, 247Sports, On3, and ESPN may conflict in their listings of height and weight.; In these cases, the average was taken. ESPN grades are on a 100-point scale.; Sources: "2015 San Diego St. Basketball Commitment List". Rivals.; "2015 San Diego St. Player Commits". ESPN.; "2015 Team Ranking". Rivals.

== Roster ==
2015–16 San Diego State Aztecs men's basketball team
Players
Coaches

Pos.	#	Name	Height	Weight	Year	Previous school	Hometown
F	0	Skylar Spencer	6 ft 10 in (2.08 m)	240 lb (109 kg)	Sr	Frederick K.C. Price H.S.	Inglewood, California
F	3	Angelo Chol	6 ft 9 in (2.06 m)	215 lb (98 kg)	RS Sr	Hoover H.S./Arizona	San Diego, California
G	4	Dakarai Allen	6 ft 5 in (1.96 m)	195 lb (88 kg)	Jr	Sheldon H.S.	Sacramento, California
F	10	Max Hoetzel (redshirt)	6 ft 9 in (2.06 m)	210 lb (95 kg)	So	Wilbraham & Monson/Indiana	Calabasas, California
G	11	D'Erryl Williams	6 ft 3 in (1.91 m)	195 lb (88 kg)	Jr	Sheldon H.S.	Sacramento, California
G	12	Trey Kell	6 ft 4 in (1.93 m)	210 lb (95 kg)	So	St. Augustine H.S.	San Diego, California
F	13	Winston Shepard	6 ft 8 in (2.03 m)	210 lb (95 kg)	Sr	Findlay Prep	Houston, Texas
F	14	Zylan Cheatham	6 ft 9 in (2.06 m)	215 lb (98 kg)	RS Fr	South Mountain H.S.	Phoenix, Arizona
G	15	Ben Perez (W)	6 ft 3 in (1.91 m)	175 lb (79 kg)	Fr	USAFA Prep School	San Marcos, California
F	20	Matt Shrigley	6 ft 6 in (1.98 m)	180 lb (82 kg)	RS Jr	La Costa Canyon H.S.	Encinitas, California
F	21	Malik Pope	6 ft 10 in (2.08 m)	210 lb (95 kg)	So	Laguna Creek H.S.	Sacramento, California
G	22	Parker U'u (W)	6 ft 5 in (1.96 m)	220 lb (100 kg)	RS Jr	Jesuit H.S./Hartford	Sacramento, California
G	23	Montaque Gill–Caesar (redshirt)	6 ft 6 in (1.98 m)	210 lb (95 kg)	So	Huntington Prep School/Missouri	Vaughan, Ontario
F	24	Nolan Narain	6 ft 9 in (2.06 m)	220 lb (100 kg)	Fr	La Lumiere School	Hamilton, Ontario
F	33	Niksha Federico (W)	6 ft 7 in (2.01 m)	190 lb (86 kg)	Jr	Cathedral Catholic H.S.	San Diego, California
G	42	Jeremy Hemsley	6 ft 3 in (1.91 m)	180 lb (82 kg)	Fr	Damien H.S.	La Verne, California

Head coach

- Steve Fisher (Illinois State)

Assistant coach(es)

- Brian Dutcher (Minnesota)
- Justin Hutson (Cal State Bakersfield)
- Dave Velasquez (San Diego State)

Legend

- (C) Team captain
- (S) Suspended
- (I) Ineligible
- (W) Walk-on
- Injured
- Current redshirt

Roster

== Schedule ==
Date time, TV	Rank^{#}	Opponent^{#}	Result	Record	Site (attendance) city, state
Exhibition
November 2*; 7:00 pm		Cal State San Marcos	W 86–48		Viejas Arena (12,414); San Diego, CA
Non-conference regular season
November 13*; 7:00 pm, ESPN3		Illinois State; MW–MVC Challenge	W 71–60	1–0	Viejas Arena (12,414); San Diego, CA
November 16*; 6:30 pm, ESPN2		at No. 16 Utah; College Hoops Tip-Off Marathon	L 76–81	1–1	Jon M. Huntsman Center (13,587); Salt Lake City, UT
November 18*; 7:00 pm, FSSD		San Diego Christian	W 71–61	2–1	Viejas Arena (12,414); San Diego, CA
November 21*; 7:00 pm, FSSD		Arkansas–Little Rock; Las Vegas Invitational	L 43–49	2–2	Viejas Arena (12,414); San Diego, CA
November 23*; 7:00 pm, ESPN3		East Carolina; Las Vegas Invitational	W 79–54	3–2	Viejas Arena (12,414); San Diego, CA
November 26*; 9:00 pm, FS1		vs. No. 14 California; Las Vegas Invitational semifinals	W 72–58	4–2	Orleans Arena; Paradise, NV
November 27*; 7:30 pm, FS1		vs. West Virginia; Las Vegas Invitational championship	L 50–72	4–3	Orleans Arena (3,245); Paradise, NV
December 1*; 7:30 pm, FSSD		at Long Beach State	W 76–72	5–3	Walter Pyramid (4,365); Long Beach, CA
December 6*; 2:00 pm, FSSD		vs. San Diego; Bill Walton Basketball Festival/City Championship	L 48–53	5–4	Petco Park (10,086); San Diego, CA
December 7*; 7:00 pm		Biola	W 73–53	6–4	Viejas Arena (12,414); San Diego, CA
December 10*; 7:00 pm		Nicholls State	W 84–47	7–4	Viejas Arena (12,414); San Diego, CA
December 18*; 7:00 pm		Grand Canyon	L 45–52	7–5	Viejas Arena (12,414); San Diego, CA
December 22*; 8:00 pm, CBSSN		No. 2 Kansas	L 57–70	7–6	Viejas Arena (12,414); San Diego, CA
Mountain West regular season
December 30; 7:00 pm, CBSSN		Wyoming	W 67–55	8–6 (1–0)	Viejas Arena (12,414); San Diego, CA
January 2; 7:00 pm, ESPNU		at Utah State	W 70–67	9–6 (2–0)	Smith Spectrum (8,626); Logan, UT
January 6; 7:00 pm, ESPN3		San Jose State	W 77–62	10–6 (3–0)	Viejas Arena (12,414); San Diego, CA
January 13; 7:00 pm, CBSSN		at Colorado State	W 69–62	11–6 (4–0)	Moby Arena (4,018); Fort Collins, CO
January 16; 7:00 pm, ESPN2		at Boise State	W 56–53	12–6 (5–0)	Taco Bell Arena (10,421); Boise, ID
January 19; 8:00 pm, ESPNU		Fresno State	W 73–67 ^{OT}	13–6 (6–0)	Viejas Arena (12,414); San Diego, CA
January 23; 3:00 pm, CBSSN		Utah State	W 70–55	14–6 (7–0)	Viejas Arena (12,414); San Diego, CA
January 26; 8:00 pm, ESPNU		at Nevada	W 57–54	15–6 (8–0)	Lawlor Events Center (6,250); Reno, NV
January 30; 5:00 pm, CBSSN		at UNLV	W 67–52	16–6 (9–0)	Thomas & Mack Center (15,243); Paradise, NV
February 2; 8:00 pm, ESPN2		Colorado State	W 69–67	17–6 (10–0)	Viejas Arena (12,414); San Diego, CA
February 6; 1:00 pm, CBSSN		New Mexico	W 78–71 ^{OT}	18–6 (11–0)	Viejas Arena (12,414); San Diego, CA
February 10; 8:00 pm, CBSSN		at Fresno State	L 57–58	18–7 (11–1)	Save Mart Center (6,476); Fresno, CA
February 13; 7:00 pm, CBSSN		Air Force	W 70–61	19–7 (12–1)	Viejas Arena (12,414); San Diego, CA
February 21; 1:00 pm, CBSSN		at San Jose State	W 78–56	20–7 (13–1)	Event Center Arena (3,317); San Jose, CA
February 24; 7:00 pm, CBSSN		at Wyoming	W 73–61	21–7 (14–1)	Arena-Auditorium (5,408); Laramie, WY
February 27; 3:00 pm, CBSSN		Boise State	L 63–66	21–8 (14–2)	Viejas Arena (12,414); San Diego, CA
March 1; 6:30 pm, CBSSN		at New Mexico	W 83–56	22–8 (15–2)	The Pit (14,540); Albuquerque, NM
March 5; 7:00 pm, CBSSN		UNLV	W 92–56	23–8 (16–2)	Viejas Arena (12,414); San Diego, CA
Mountain West tournament
March 10; 12:00 pm, CBSSN	(1)	vs. (9) Utah State; Quarterfinals	W 71–65	24–8	Thomas & Mack Center (8,279); Paradise, NV
March 11; 6:00 pm, CBSSN	(1)	vs. (5) Nevada; Semifinals	W 67–55	25–8	Thomas & Mack Center (8,036); Paradise, NV
March 11; 3:00 pm, CBS	(1)	vs. (2) Fresno State; Championship game	L 63–68	25–9	Thomas & Mack Center (8,132); Paradise, NV
NIT
March 15*; 7:00 pm, ESPN3	(2)	(7) IPFW; First Round – South Carolina Bracket	W 79–55	26–9	Viejas Arena (8,324); San Diego, CA
March 21*; 8:30 pm, ESPN2	(2)	(3) Washington; Second Round – South Carolina Bracket	W 93–78	27–9	Viejas Arena (12,414); San Diego, CA
March 23*; 6:00 pm, ESPN2	(2)	(4) Georgia Tech; Quarterfinals – South Carolina Bracket	W 72–56	28–9	Viejas Arena (12,414); San Diego, CA
March 29*; 9:00 pm, ESPN	(2)	(4) George Washington; Semifinals	L 46–65	28–10	Madison Square Garden (8,298); New York, NY
*Non-conference game. ^{#}Rankings from AP Poll. (#) Tournament seedings in parentheses. All times are in Pacific Time.
