= 2015–16 Washington Huskies men's basketball team =

American college basketball season

2015–16 Washington Huskies men's basketball

NIT, Second Round
- Conference: Pac-12 Conference
- Record: 19–15 (9–9 Pac-12)
- Head coach: Lorenzo Romar (14th season)
- Assistant coaches: Raphael Chillious; Will Conroy; Brad Jackson
- Home arena: Alaska Airlines Arena

2015–16 Pac-12 Conference men's basketball standings
	Conf.				Overall
Team	W		L	PCT	W		L	PCT
No. 5 Oregon †	14	–	4	.778	31	–	7	.816
No. 13 Utah	13	–	5	.722	27	–	9	.750
No. 17 Arizona	12	–	6	.667	25	–	9	.735
No. 23 California	12	–	6	.667	23	–	11	.676
Colorado	10	–	8	.556	22	–	12	.647
USC	9	–	9	.500	21	–	13	.618
Oregon State	9	–	9	.500	19	–	13	.594
Washington	9	–	9	.500	19	–	15	.559
Stanford	8	–	10	.444	15	–	15	.500
UCLA	6	–	12	.333	15	–	17	.469
Arizona State	5	–	13	.278	15	–	17	.469
Washington State	1	–	17	.056	9	–	22	.290
† Pac-12 Tournament winner Rankings from AP poll

The 2015–16 Washington Huskies men's basketball team represented the University of Washington in the 2015–16 NCAA Division I men's basketball season. The Huskies were led by fourteenth-year head coach Lorenzo Romar. They played their games at Alaska Airlines Arena at Hec Edmundson Pavilion as members of the Pac-12 Conference. They finished the season 19–15, 9–9 in Pac-12 play to finish in a three-way tie for sixth place. They defeated Stanford in the first round of the Pac-12 tournament to advance to the quarterfinals, where they lost to Oregon. They were invited to the National Invitation Tournament, where they defeated Long Beach State in the first round to advance to the second round, where they lost to San Diego State.

== Previous season ==
The 2014–15 Washington Huskies finished the season with an overall record of 16–15, and 5–13 in the Pac-12 conference play. They lost to Stanford in the first round of the Pac-12 tournament.

== Departures ==
Name	Number	Pos.	Height	Weight	Year	Hometown	Reason for departure
Darin Johnson	1	G	6'5"	200	Junior	Sacramento, California	Transferred to Cal State Northridge
Nigel Williams-Goss	5	G	6'3"	190	Sophomore	Happy Valley, Oregon	Transferred to Gonzaga
Mike Anderson	11	G	6'4"	205	Senior	Hartford, Connecticut	Graduated
Jernard Jarreau	21	F	6'10"	240	RS junior	New Orleans	Transferred to Tulane
Robert Upshaw	24	C	7'0"	250	RS sophomore	Fresno, California	Dismissed from team for violation of team rules/2015 NBA draft
Jahmel Taylor	33	G	6'0"	170	Sophomore	Los Angeles	Transferred to Fresno State
Gilles Dierickx	34	C	7'0"	230	RS junior	Ghent, Belgium	Transferred to Seattle Pacific
Shawn Kemp, Jr.	40	F	6'9"	255	Senior	Canton, Georgia	Graduated

=== Incoming transfers ===
Name	Number	Pos.	Height	Weight	Year	Hometown	Notes
Malik Dime	10	F	6'9"	220	Junior	Columbus, Ohio	Junior college transfer from Indian Hills Community College
Matthew Atewe	41	C	6'9"	235	Junior	Brampton, ON	Transferred from Auburn University. Atewe would redshirt for the 2015–16 season, under NCAA transfer rules. He would have two years of eligibility.

== 2015 recruiting class ==
College recruiting
Name	Hometown	School	Height	Weight	Commit date
David Crisp; PG	Lakewood, Washington	Brewster Academy	6 ft 2 in (1.88 m)	180 lb (82 kg)	Jan 12, 2014
David Crisp; PG	Recruit ratings: Scout: Rivals: 247Sports: ESPN:				
Marquese Chriss #13 PF	Elk Grove, California	Pleasant Grove High School	6 ft 8 in (2.03 m)	200 lb (91 kg)	Jan 13, 2014
Marquese Chriss #13 PF	Recruit ratings: Scout: Rivals: 247Sports: ESPN:				
Dejounte Murray #16 SG	Seattle	Rainier Beach High School	6 ft 5 in (1.96 m)	175 lb (79 kg)	Jun 3, 2014
Dejounte Murray #16 SG	Recruit ratings: Scout: Rivals: 247Sports: ESPN:				
Matisse Thybulle #26 SF	Sammamish, Washington	Eastside Catholic School	6 ft 6 in (1.98 m)	185 lb (84 kg)	Sep 29, 2014
Matisse Thybulle #26 SF	Recruit ratings: Scout: Rivals: 247Sports: ESPN:				
Devenir Duruisseau; PF	Palmdale, California	Fishburne Military School	6 ft 9 in (2.06 m)	240 lb (110 kg)	Oct 20, 2014
Devenir Duruisseau; PF	Recruit ratings: Scout: Rivals: 247Sports: ESPN:				
Dominic Green #69 SF	Renton, Washington	Hazen High School	6 ft 6 in (1.98 m)	175 lb (79 kg)	Apr 26, 2015
Dominic Green #69 SF	Recruit ratings: Scout: Rivals: 247Sports: ESPN:				
Noah Dickerson #9 PF	Atlanta	Montverde Academy	6 ft 8 in (2.03 m)	237 lb (108 kg)	Jun 4, 2015
Noah Dickerson #9 PF	Recruit ratings: Scout: Rivals: 247Sports: ESPN:				
Overall recruit ranking: Scout: 9 Rivals: 13 ESPN: 15
Note: In many cases, Scout, Rivals, 247Sports, On3, and ESPN may conflict in their listings of height and weight.; In these cases, the average was taken. ESPN grades are on a 100-point scale.; Sources: "2015 Washington Signees". Rivals.; "2015 Washington Signees". Scout.; "2015 Washington Signees". ESPN.; "Scout.com Team Recruiting Rankings". Scout.; "2015 Team Ranking". Rivals.

=== 2016 recruiting class ===
College recruiting (2016)
Name	Hometown	School	Height	Weight	Commit date
Sam Timmins; C	Christchurch, New Zealand	SP Middleton Grange High School	6 ft 10 in (2.08 m)	250 lb (110 kg)	Apr 28, 2015
Sam Timmins; C	Recruit ratings: Scout: Rivals: 247Sports: ESPN:				
Markelle Fultz #3 SG	Upper Marlboro, Maryland	DeMatha Catholic High School	6 ft 4 in (1.93 m)	185 lb (84 kg)	Aug 21, 2015
Markelle Fultz #3 SG	Recruit ratings: Scout: Rivals: 247Sports: ESPN:				
Overall recruit ranking:
Note: In many cases, Scout, Rivals, 247Sports, On3, and ESPN may conflict in their listings of height and weight.; In these cases, the average was taken. ESPN grades are on a 100-point scale.; Sources: "2016 Washington Signees". Rivals.; "2016 Washington Signees". Scout.; "2016 Washington Signees". ESPN.; "Scout.com Team Recruiting Rankings". Scout.; "2016 Team Ranking". Rivals.

== Roster ==
2015–16 Washington Huskies men's basketball team
Players
Coaches

Pos.	#	Name	Height	Weight	Year	Previous school	Hometown
F	0	Marquese Chriss	6 ft 9 in (2.06 m)	225 lb (102 kg)	Fr	Pleasant Grove HS	Sacramento, California
G	1	David Crisp	6 ft 0 in (1.83 m)	190 lb (86 kg)	Fr	Brewster Academy	Tacoma, Washington
F	4	Matisse Thybulle	6 ft 5 in (1.96 m)	195 lb (88 kg)	Fr	Eastside Catholic School	Issaquah, Washington
G	5	Dejounte Murray	6 ft 5 in (1.96 m)	170 lb (77 kg)	Fr	Rainier Beach HS	Seattle, Washington
F	10	Malik Dime	6 ft 9 in (2.06 m)	220 lb (100 kg)	Jr	Indian Hills CC	Columbus, Ohio
F	11	Joe Knight (W)	6 ft 9 in (2.06 m)	225 lb (102 kg)	Jr	Roosevelt HS	Seattle, Washington
G	12	Andrew Andrews (C)	6 ft 2 in (1.88 m)	200 lb (91 kg)	RS Sr	Benson Poly HS	Portland, Oregon
G	15	K. J. Garrett (W)	6 ft 3 in (1.91 m)	195 lb (88 kg)	So	Rolling Hills Prep	Manhattan Beach, California
F	15	Noah Dickerson	6 ft 8 in (2.03 m)	235 lb (107 kg)	Fr	Montverde Academy	Atlanta, Georgia
G	20	Dan Kingma	5 ft 10 in (1.78 m)	155 lb (70 kg)	So	Henry M. Jackson HS	Mill Creek, Washington
F	22	Dominic Green	6 ft 6 in (1.98 m)	185 lb (84 kg)	Fr	Hazen HS	Renton, Washington
F	23	Greg Bowman (W)	6 ft 5 in (1.96 m)	220 lb (100 kg)	So	Mountlake Terrace HS	Mountlake Terrace, Washington
F	24	Devenir Duruisseau	6 ft 8 in (2.03 m)	225 lb (102 kg)	Fr	Fishburne Military School	Palmdale, California
F	41	Matthew Atewe (I) (redshirt)	6 ft 8 in (2.03 m)	240 lb (109 kg)	Jr	Auburn	Brampton, Ontario
F	42	Donaven Dorsey	6 ft 5.5 in (1.97 m)	210 lb (95 kg)	So	Timberline HS	Lacey, Washington

Head coach

- Lorenzo Romar (Washington)

Assistant coach(es)

- Raphael Chillious (Lafayette)
- Will Conroy (Washington)
- Brad Jackson (Washington State)

Legend

- (C) Team captain
- (S) Suspended
- (I) Ineligible
- (W) Walk-on
- (D) Dismissed
- Injured
- Current redshirt

Roster
Last update: November 16, 2015

=== Coaching staff ===
Name	Position	Year at Washington	Alma mater (year)
Lorenzo Romar	Head coach	14th	Washington (1980)
Raphael Chillious	Assistant coach	6th	Lafayette (1996)
Will Conroy	Assistant coach	1st	Washington (2005)
Brad Jackson	Assistant coach	4th	Washington State (1975)
Tiffani Walker	Director of basketball operations	2nd	Illinois (2003)
Daniel Shapiro	Strength and conditioning coach	3rd	Seattle Pacific (2000)

== Schedule ==
Washington's basketball schedule featured a matchup with Texas in Shanghai, China. The Huskies were also invited to play in the Battle 4 Atlantis, where they played against the three following teams in the Bahamas: Gonzaga, Texas, and Charlotte. Washington also hosted TCU, Montana, Penn, and Oakland.

Date time, TV	Rank^{#}	Opponent^{#}	Result	Record	High points	High rebounds	High assists	Site (attendance) city, state
Exhibition
Nov 5*; 7:00 pm		Seattle Pacific	W 98–80	–	21 – Andrews	6 – Dickerson	5 – Andrews	Alaska Airlines Arena (4,978); Seattle, WA
Non-conference regular season
Nov 13*; 7:00 pm, ESPN		vs. Texas; China Opener	W 77–71	1–0	23 – Andrews	15 – Dime	4 – Murray	Mercedes-Benz Arena (7,188); Shanghai, China
Nov 19*; 7:30 pm, P12N		Mount St. Mary's; Battle 4 Atlantis Opening Round	W 100–67	2–0	29 – Chriss	10 – Chriss	5 – Murray	Alaska Airlines Arena (5,381); Seattle, WA
Nov 21*; 12:00 pm, P12N		Penn	W 104–67	3–0	22 – Murray	7 – Dickerson	5 – Andrews	Alaska Airlines Arena (6,495); Seattle, WA
Nov 25*; 9:00 am, ESPN2		vs. No. 10 Gonzaga; Battle 4 Atlantis Quarterfinals	L 64–80	3–1	21 – 2 Tied	11 – 3 Tied	4 – Andrews	Imperial Arena (1,374); Nassau, Bahamas
Nov 26*; 4:00 pm, AXS TV		vs. Texas; Battle 4 Atlantis 2nd Round Consolation	L 70–82	3–2	20 – Andrews	9 – Murray	5 – Andrews	Imperial Arena (1,316); Nassau, Bahamas
Nov 27*; 6:30 pm, AXS TV		vs. Charlotte; Battle 4 Atlantis 7th Place Game	W 71–66	4–2	30 – Andrews	13 – Andrews	5 – Andrews	Imperial Arena (1,065); Nassau, Bahamas
Dec 6*; 6:00 pm, P12N		Cal State Fullerton	W 87–69	5–2	17 – Murray	10 – Andrews	5 – Murray	Alaska Airlines Arena (5,821); Seattle, WA
Dec 8*; 8:00 pm, P12N		TCU	W 92–67	6–2	32 – Andrews	8 – Dickerson	6 – Murray	Alaska Airlines Arena (5,651); Seattle, WA
Dec 12*; 3:00 pm, P12N		Montana	W 92–62	7–2	22 – Chriss	11 – Chriss	4 – Chriss	Alaska Airlines Arena (6,647); Seattle, WA
Dec 19*; 1:30 pm, P12N		Oakland	L 83–97	7–3	16 – 2 Tied	9 – Dickerson	7 – Murray	Alaska Airlines Arena (5,836); Seattle, WA
Dec 22*; 8:00 pm, P12N		Seattle	W 79–68	8–3	18 – Andrews	6 – Dickerson	8 – Andrews	Alaska Airlines Arena (6,921); Seattle, WA
Dec 28*; 8:00 pm, P12N		UC Santa Barbara	L 78–83	8–4	17 – 2 Tied	8 – 2 Tied	6 – Murray	Alaska Airlines Arena (7,376); Seattle, WA
Pac-12 regular season
Jan 1; 8:00 pm, FS1		No. 25 UCLA	W 96–93 ^{2OT}	9–4 (1–0)	35 – Andrews	10 – Dickerson	5 – 2 Tied	Alaska Airlines Arena (6,920); Seattle, WA
Jan 3; 12:00 pm, P12N		USC	W 87–85	10–4 (2–0)	29 – Murray	12 – Chriss	4 – Andrews	Alaska Airlines Arena (7,031); Seattle, WA
Jan 9; 12:00 pm, P12N		at Washington State; Rivalry	W 99–95 ^{OT}	11–4 (3–0)	29 – Andrews	10 – Andrews	7 – 2 Tied	Beasley Coliseum (4,025); Pullman, WA
Jan 14; 6:00 pm, FS1		at No. 18 Arizona	L 67–99	11–5 (3–1)	17 – Dickerson	5 – 2 Tied	8 – 2 Tied	McKale Center (14,479); Tucson, AZ
Jan 16; 4:00 pm, P12N		at Arizona State	W 89–85	12–5 (4–1)	30 – Andrews	9 – Murray	12 – Andrews	Wells Fargo Arena (5,652); Tempe, AZ
Jan 20; 7:00 pm, P12N		Colorado	W 95–83	13–5 (5–1)	33 – Andrews	6 – 4 Tied	6 – Crisp	Alaska Airlines Arena (6,325); Seattle, WA
Jan 24; 5:30 pm, ESPNU		Utah	L 75–80 ^{OT}	13–6 (5–2)	17 – Andrews	13 – Murray	6 – Murray	Alaska Airlines Arena (8,073); Seattle, WA
Jan 28; 7:00 pm, FS1		at UCLA	W 86–84	14–6 (6–2)	15 – Dickerson	10 – Dime	8 – Andrews	Pauley Pavilion (6,843); Los Angeles, CA
Jan 30; 12:00 pm, P12N		at USC	L 88–98	14–7 (6–3)	18 – 2 Tied	6 – 2 Tied	8 – Murray	Galen Center (6,387); Los Angeles, CA
Feb 3; 8:00 pm, ESPNU		Arizona State	W 95–83 ^{OT}	15–7 (7–3)	34 – Murray	11 – Murray	6 – Murray	Alaska Airlines Arena (6,533); Seattle, WA
Feb 6; 1:30 pm, FOX		No. 23 Arizona	L 72–77	15–8 (7–4)	20 – Andrews	7 – Chriss	4 – Murray	Alaska Airlines Arena (9,266); Seattle, WA
Feb 10; 6:00 pm, ESPN2		at Utah	L 82–90	15–9 (7–5)	24 – Chriss	9 – Dime	5 – Tied	Jon M. Huntsman Center (12,616); Salt Lake City, UT
Feb 13; 11:00 am, P12N		at Colorado	L 80–81	15–10 (7–6)	18 – Tied	10 – Chriss	3 – 3 Tied	Coors Events Center (9,476); Boulder, CO
Feb 18; 8:00 pm, FS1		California	L 75–78	15–11 (7–7)	18 – Andrews	8 – Tied	5 – Murray	Alaska Airlines Arena (7,530); Seattle, WA
Feb 20; 5:00 pm, P12N		Stanford	W 64–53	16–11 (8–7)	25 – Murray	9 – Murray	6 – Andrews	Alaska Airlines Arena (9,161); Seattle, WA
Feb 24; 8:00 pm, ESPNU		at Oregon State	L 81–82	16–12 (8–8)	30 – Andrews	6 – Andrews	5 – Andrews	Gill Coliseum (5,593); Corvallis, OR
Feb 28; 5:30 pm, ESPNU		at No. 13 Oregon	L 73–86	16–13 (8–9)	21 – Andrews	5 – Dime	8 – Andrews	Matthew Knight Arena (12,364); Eugene, OR
Mar 2; 8:00 pm, ESPNU		Washington State; Rivalry	W 99–91	17–13 (9–9)	47 – Andrews	8 – Dime	4 – Tied	Alaska Airlines Arena (7,655); Seattle, WA
Pac-12 Tournament
Mar 9; 12:00 pm, P12N		vs. Stanford; First Round	W 91–68	18–13	25 – Murray	10 – Tied	9 – Andrews	MGM Grand Garden Arena (12,916); Paradise, NV
Mar 10; 12:00 pm, P12N		vs. No. 8 Oregon; Quarterfinals	L 77–83	18–14	19 – Tied	9 – Murray	7 – Murray	MGM Grand Garden Arena (12,916); Paradise, NV
NIT
Mar 15*; 6:00 pm, ESPN2	(3)	(6) Long Beach State; First Round – South Carolina Bracket	W 107–102	19–14	30 – Murray	11 – Chriss	5 – Tied	Alaska Airlines Arena (3,505); Seattle, WA
Mar 21*; 8:30 pm, ESPN2	(3)	at (2) San Diego State; Second Round – South Carolina Bracket	L 78–93	19–15	20 – Murray	9 – Murray	6 – Andrews	Viejas Arena (12,414); San Diego, CA
*Non-conference game. ^{#}Rankings from AP Poll. (#) Tournament seedings in parentheses. All times are in Pacific Time.

== See also ==
- 2015–16 Washington Huskies women's basketball team
