= 2016 Big West Conference men's basketball tournament =

- Classification: Division I
- Season: 2015–16
- Teams: 8
- Site: Honda Center; Anaheim, California
- Champions: Hawaii (1st title)
- Winning coach: Eran Ganot (1st title)
- MVP: Aaron Valdes (Hawaii)
- Television: Prime Ticket; ESPN3; ESPNU; ESPN2

2015–16 Big West men's basketball standings
	Conf.				Overall
Team	W		L	PCT	W		L	PCT
Hawai'i †	13	–	3	.813	28	–	6	.824
UC Irvine	13	–	3	.813	28	–	10	.737
Long Beach State	12	–	4	.750	20	–	15	.571
UC Santa Barbara	11	–	5	.688	19	–	14	.576
UC Davis	6	–	10	.375	11	–	19	.367
UC Riverside	5	–	11	.313	14	–	19	.424
Cal State Northridge*	5	–	11	.313	10	–	20	.333
Cal Poly	4	–	12	.250	10	–	20	.333
Cal State Fullerton	3	–	13	.188	10	–	20	.333
† 2016 Big West tournament winner *ineligible for postseason due to self-imposed ban due to academic fraud violations

The 2016 Big West Conference men's basketball tournament took place from March 10–12, 2016 at the Honda Center in Anaheim, California. Hawaii won the tournament, defeating Long Beach State in the championship, and received the conference's automatic bid to the 2016 NCAA tournament. Cal State Northridge did not participate in the tournament due to a self-imposed postseason ban for academic fraud violations.

== Seeds ==
The top 8 conference teams were eligible for the tournament. Teams were seeded by record within the conference, with a tiebreaker system to seed teams with identical conference records. Teams were reseeded after the Quarterfinals.

Seed	School	Conference	Tiebreaker
1	Hawaii	13–3	2–0 vs. UC Irvine
2	UC Irvine	13–3	0–2 vs. Hawaii
3	Long Beach State	12–4	
4	UC Santa Barbara	11–5	
5	UC Davis	6–10	
6	UC Riverside	5–11	
7	Cal Poly	4–12	
8	Cal State Fullerton	3–13	

== Schedule ==
Game	Time*	Matchup^{#}	Final score	Television
Quarterfinals – Thursday, March 10
1	12:00 pm	#4 UC Santa Barbara vs. #5 UC Davis	87–61	Prime Ticket
2	2:30 pm	#1 Hawaii vs. #8 CS Fullerton	75–44	Prime Ticket
3	6:00 pm	#2 UC Irvine vs. #7 Cal Poly	84–64	Prime Ticket
4	8:30 pm	#3 Long Beach State v. #6 UC Riverside	82–74	Prime Ticket
Semifinals – Friday, March 11
5	6:30 pm	#1 Hawaii vs. #4 UC Santa Barbara	88–76	ESPN3
6	9:00 pm	#2 UC Irvine vs. #3 Long Beach State	72–77	ESPNU
Championship – Saturday, March 12
7	8:30 pm	#1 Hawaii vs. #3 Long Beach State	64–60	ESPN2
*Game times in PT. #-Rankings denote tournament seeding. All games held at Honda Center, Anaheim, CA

== Bracket ==
Quarterfinals; Thursday, March 10; FS PRIME
1	Hawaii	75
8	Cal State Fullerton	44
4	UC Santa Barbara	87
5	UC Davis	61
(Pairings are reseeded after the first round)
2	UC Irvine	84
7	Cal Poly	64
3	Long Beach State	82
6	UC Riverside	74

Semifinals; Friday, March 11; ESPNU and ESPN3 (re-seeded)
1	Hawaii	88
4	UC Santa Barbara	76
2	UC Irvine	72
3	Long Beach State	77

Championship; Saturday, March 12; ESPN2
1	Hawaii	64
3	Long Beach State	60
