= 2015–16 UNLV Runnin' Rebels basketball team =

American college basketball season

2015–16 UNLV Runnin' Rebels basketball
- Conference: Mountain West Conference
- Record: 18–15 (8–10 Mountain West)
- Head coach: Dave Rice (fired Jan. 10, 2016); Todd Simon (from Jan. 11, 2016)
- Assistant coaches: Ryan Miller (2nd season); Stacey Augmon
- Home arena: Thomas & Mack Center

2015–16 Mountain West Conference men's basketball standings
	Conf.				Overall
Team	W		L	PCT	W		L	PCT
San Diego State	16	–	2	.889	28	–	10	.737
Fresno State †	13	–	5	.722	25	–	10	.714
Boise State	11	–	7	.611	20	–	12	.625
Nevada	10	–	8	.556	24	–	14	.632
New Mexico	10	–	8	.556	17	–	15	.531
Colorado State	8	–	10	.444	18	–	16	.529
UNLV	8	–	10	.444	18	–	15	.545
Utah State	7	–	11	.389	16	–	15	.516
Wyoming	7	–	11	.389	14	–	18	.438
Air Force	5	–	13	.278	14	–	18	.438
San Jose State	4	–	14	.222	9	–	22	.290
† Conference tournament winner

The 2015–16 UNLV Runnin' Rebels basketball team represented the University of Nevada, Las Vegas during the 2015–16 NCAA Division I men's basketball season. The Runnin' Rebels were led by fifth-year head coach Dave Rice until he was fired on January 10, 2016. They were then led by interim head coach Todd Simon for the remainder of the season. They played their home games at the Thomas & Mack Center in Paradise, Nevada as members of the Mountain West Conference. They finished the season 18–15, 8–10 in Mountain West play, to finish in a tie for sixth place. They defeated Air Force to advance to the quarterfinals of the Mountain West tournament where they lost to Fresno State.

On March 28, the school announced that Chris Beard had been hired as head coach. However, less than three weeks later, Beard left UNLV to accept the head coaching position at Texas Tech. On April 16, the school hired Marvin Menzies as head coach.

== Previous season ==
The 2014–15 Runnin' Rebels finished the season with an overall record of 18–15, and 8–10 in Mountain West play. The Runnin' Rebels defeated Nevada in the first round of the Mountain West tournament, before losing to San Diego State in the quarterfinals.

== Departures ==
Name	Number	Pos.	Height	Weight	Year	Hometown	Notes
Rashad Vaughn	1	G	6'6"	210	Freshman	Golden Valley, MN	Declared for 2015 NBA draft
Christian Wood	5	F	6'11"	220	Sophomore	Long Beach, CA	Declared for 2015 NBA draft
Barry Cheaney	12	G	6'1"	165	RS Junior	Corona, CA	Walk-on; did not return
Jelan Kendrick	22	G	6'6"	210	RS Senior	Atlanta, GA	Graduated
Dantley Walker	30	G	5'11"	170	RS Freshman	Panaca, NV	Transferred to Chaminade
Charles Rushman	33	G	6'3"	185	RS Junior	Oconomowoc, WI	Transferred to Lindenwood
Cody Doolin	45	G	6'3"	180	Senior	Austin, TX	Graduated

=== Incoming transfers ===
Name	Number	Pos.	Height	Weight	Year	Hometown	Notes
Ike Nwamu	0	G	6'5"	205	RS Senior	Greensboro, NC	Graduate transfer from Mercer University. Will be eligible to play immediately since Nwamu graduated from Mercer.
Tyrell Bellot-Green	12	F	6'7"		Junior	Toronto, ON	Junior college transfer from Hill College
Chris Obekpa	34	F/C	6'10"	236	Senior	Makurdi, Nigeria	Transferred from St. John's. Under NCAA transfer rules, Obekpa will have to sit out the 2015–16 season. Will have one year of eligibility left.

== 2015 recruiting class ==
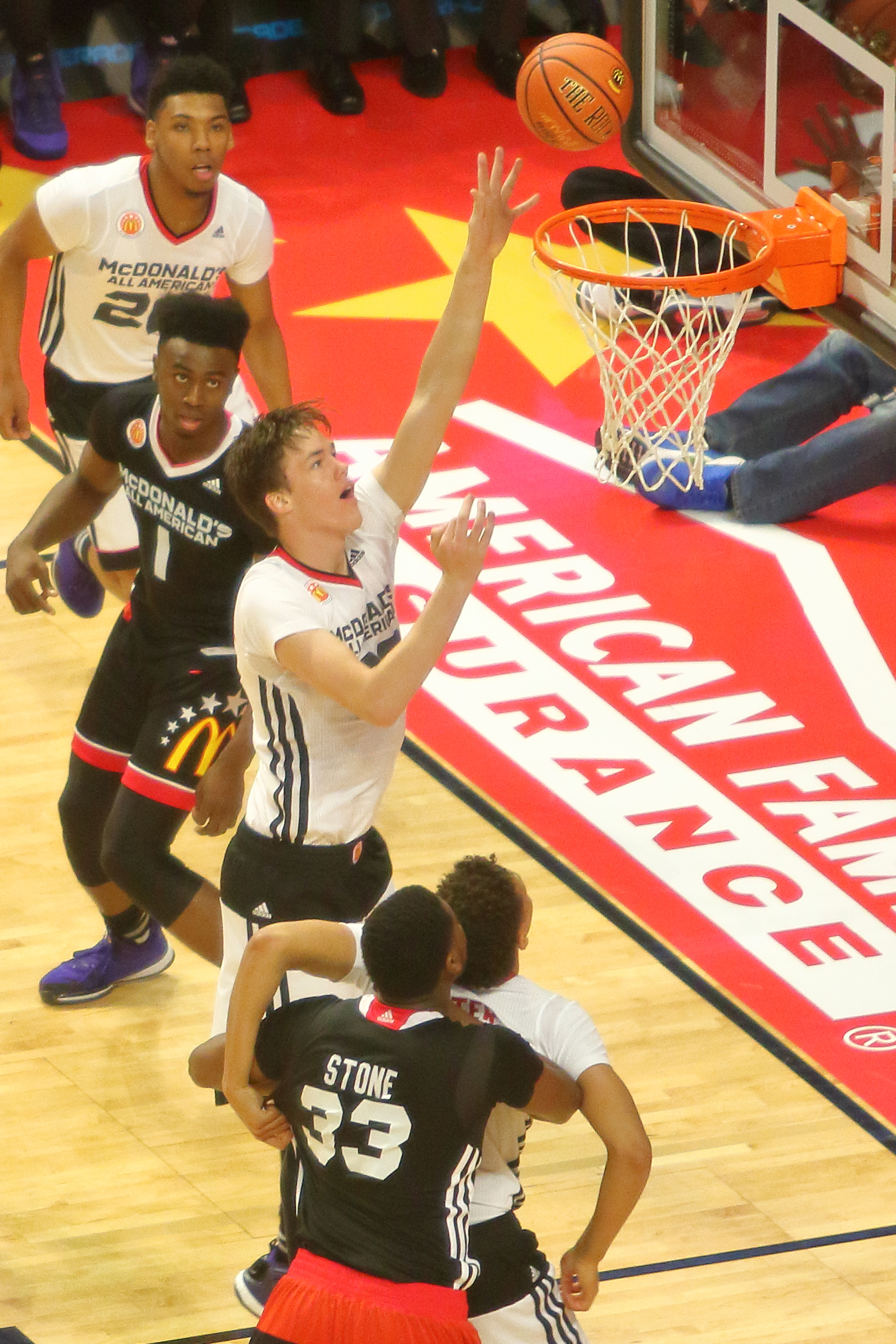
Stephen Zimmerman in the 2015 McDonald's All-American Boys Game

College recruiting information
Name	Hometown	School	Height	Weight	Commit date
Jaylen Poyser #64 SG	Malton, ON	Athlete Institute Basketball Academy	6 ft 4 in (1.93 m)	180 lb (82 kg)	Nov 2, 2014
Jaylen Poyser #64 SG	Recruit ratings: Scout: Rivals: 247Sports: ESPN:				
Derrick Jones #3 SF	Philadelphia, PA	Archbishop John Carroll High School	6 ft 6 in (1.98 m)	180 lb (82 kg)	Nov 13, 2014
Derrick Jones #3 SF	Recruit ratings: Scout: Rivals: 247Sports: ESPN:				
Stephen Zimmerman #5 C	Las Vegas, NV	Bishop Gorman High School	7 ft 0 in (2.13 m)	230 lb (100 kg)	Apr 16, 2015
Stephen Zimmerman #5 C	Recruit ratings: Scout: Rivals: 247Sports: ESPN:				
Overall recruit ranking:
Note: In many cases, Scout, Rivals, 247Sports, On3, and ESPN may conflict in their listings of height and weight.; In these cases, the average was taken. ESPN grades are on a 100-point scale.; Sources: "2015 UNLV Basketball Commitments". Rivals.; "2015 UNLV Player Commits". ESPN.; "2015 Team Ranking". Rivals.

== Roster ==
2015–16 UNLV Runnin' Rebels men's basketball team
Players
Coaches

Pos.	#	Name	Height	Weight	Year	Previous school	Hometown
F	1	Derrick Jones Jr.	6 ft 7 in (2.01 m)	190 lb (86 kg)	Fr	Archbishop John Carroll HS	Philadelphia, PA
G	2	Jerome Seagears	6 ft 1 in (1.85 m)	180 lb (82 kg)	RS Sr	Rutgers	Silver Spring, MD
G	3	Jordan Cornish	6 ft 6 in (1.98 m)	220 lb (100 kg)	So	Brother Martin HS	New Orleans, LA
G	10	Daquan Cook	6 ft 2 in (1.88 m)	170 lb (77 kg)	Sr	St. Frances Academy	Baltimore, MD
F	12	Tyrell Green	6 ft 7 in (2.01 m)	225 lb (102 kg)	Jr	Hill College	Toronto, ON
F	13	Ben Carter	6 ft 9 in (2.06 m)	225 lb (102 kg)	RS Jr	Oregon	Las Vegas, NV
G	14	Alex Perez	6 ft 4 in (1.93 m)	180 lb (82 kg)	Sr	St. Katherine	San Diego, CA
F	15	Dwayne Morgan	6 ft 8 in (2.03 m)	205 lb (93 kg)	So	St. Frances Academy	Baltimore, MD
G	20	Austin Starr	6 ft 3 in (1.91 m)	185 lb (84 kg)	Fr	Foothill HS	Las Vegas, NV
G	22	Patrick McCaw	6 ft 7 in (2.01 m)	185 lb (84 kg)	So	Montrose Christian School	St. Louis, MO
G	24	Jaylen Poyser	6 ft 4 in (1.93 m)	180 lb (82 kg)	Fr	Athlete Institute Basketball Academy	Malton, ON
C	33	Stephen Zimmerman	7 ft 0 in (2.13 m)	240 lb (109 kg)	Fr	Bishop Gorman HS	Las Vegas, NV
G	34*	Ike Nwamu	6 ft 5 in (1.96 m)	210 lb (95 kg)	RS Sr	Mercer	Greensboro, NC
C	35	Chris Obekpa (I) (redshirt)	6 ft 10 in (2.08 m)	225 lb (102 kg)	Sr	St. John's	Makurdi, Nigeria

Head coach

- Todd Simon (UNLV)

Assistant coach(es)

- Ryan Miller (Northern State)
- Stacey Augmon (UNLV)

Legend

- (C) Team captain
- (S) Suspended
- (I) Ineligible
- (W) Walk-on
- Injured
- Current redshirt

Roster
Last update: May 30, 2024

- November 27, 2015 – Sophomore Goodluck Okonoboh asked for his release and will transfer.
- February 8, 2016 – Freshman Stephen Zimmerman out indefinitely due to a left knee injury. Returned for the February 27 game against Wyoming.

* Ike Nwamu wore #0 until February 6 when he changed to #34 to honor former Mercer teammate Jibri Bryan who was murdered on February 2.

== Schedule ==
Date time, TV	Opponent	Result	Record	Site (attendance) city, state
Exhibition
11/06/2015*; 7:00 p.m.	Whittier	W 94–57		Thomas & Mack Center (10,232); Paradise, NV
Non-conference regular season
11/13/2015*; 7:00 p.m.	Cal Poly; Maui Invitational opening round	W 74–72	1–0	Thomas & Mack Center (12,201); Paradise, NV
11/16/2015*; 7:00 p.m.	New Mexico Highlands	W 107–45	2–0	Thomas & Mack Center (9,961); Paradise, NV
11/18/2015*; 7:30 p.m.	Southern Utah	W 84–64	3–0	Thomas & Mack Center (10,824); Paradise, NV
11/23/2015*; 8:30 p.m., ESPN2	vs. UCLA; Maui Invitational Quarterfinals	L 75–77	3–1	Lahaina Civic Center (2,400); Maui, HI
11/24/2015*; 1:30 p.m., ESPN2	vs. Chaminade; Maui Invitational second-round consolation	W 93–73	4–1	Lahaina Civic Center (2,400); Maui, HI
11/25/2015*; 2:00 p.m., ESPN2	vs. No. 13 Indiana; Maui Invitational fifth-place game	W 72–69	5–1	Lahaina Civic Center (2,400); Maui, HI
11/28/2015*; 7:00 p.m.	Prairie View A&M	W 80–62	6–1	Thomas & Mack Center (10,858); Paradise, NV
12/04/2015*; 8:00 p.m., ESPN2	vs. No. 15 Oregon; MGM Grand Showcase	W 80–69	7–1	MGM Grand Garden Arena (12,117); Paradise, NV
12/09/2015*; 6:00 p.m., ESPN2	at Wichita State; MW–MVC Challenge	L 50–56	7–2	Charles Koch Arena (10,506); Wichita, KS
12/12/2015*; 7:00 p.m.	at UC Riverside	W 73–62	8–2	Student Recreation Center (1,772); Riverside, CA
12/16/2015*; 7:00 p.m., CBSSN	Arizona State	L 56–66	8–3	Thomas & Mack Center (13,014); Paradise, NV
12/19/2015*; 5:30 p.m., ESPN2	at No. 13 Arizona	L 70–82	8–4	McKale Center (14,644); Tucson, AZ
12/22/2015*; 7:00 p.m.	South Dakota	W 103–68	9–4	Thomas & Mack Center (11,990); Paradise, NV
Mountain West regular season
12/30/2015; 7:00 p.m., ESPN3	Fresno State	L 66–69	9–5 (0–1)	Thomas & Mack Center (12,220); Paradise, NV
01/06/2016; 7:00 p.m., CBSSN	at Colorado State	L 65–66	9–6 (0–2)	Moby Arena (3,431); Fort Collins, CO
01/09/2016; 3:00 p.m., CBSSN	at Wyoming	L 57–59	9–7 (0–3)	Arena-Auditorium (5,485); Laramie, WY
01/13/2016; 7:00 p.m., CBSSN	New Mexico	W 86–74	10–7 (1–3)	Thomas & Mack Center (11,377); Paradise, NV
01/16/2016; 7:00 p.m., ESPN3	Air Force	W 100–64	11–7 (2–3)	Thomas & Mack Center (13,198); Paradise, NV
01/19/2016; 8:00 p.m., ESPN3	at Utah State	W 80–68	12–7 (3–3)	Smith Spectrum (9,394); Logan, UT
01/23/2016; 7:00 p.m., ESPNU	at Nevada	L 63–65	12–8 (3–4)	Lawlor Events Center (11,341); Reno, NV
01/27/2016; 8:00 p.m., CBSSN	Boise State	W 87–77	13–8 (4–4)	Thomas & Mack Center (12,586); Paradise, NV
01/30/2016; 5:00 p.m., CBSSN	San Diego State	L 52–67	13–9 (4–5)	Thomas & Mack Center (15,243); Paradise, NV
02/02/2016; 5:00 p.m., CBSSN	at New Mexico	L 83–87	13–10 (4–6)	WisePies Arena (13,359); Albuquerque, NM
02/06/2016; 4:00 p.m., ESPN3	at Fresno State	L 104–111 ^{2OT}	13–11 (4–7)	Save Mart Center (7,754); Fresno, CA
02/10/2016; 7:00 p.m., ESPN3	San Jose State	W 64–61	14–11 (5–7)	Thomas & Mack Center (11,647); Paradise, NV
02/13/2016; 7:00 p.m., ESPNU	Colorado State	W 87–80	15–11 (6–7)	Thomas & Mack Center (11,753); Paradise, NV
02/17/2016; 6:30 p.m., CBSSN	at Air Force	L 74–79	15–12 (6–8)	Clune Arena (1,445); Colorado Springs, CO
02/20/2016; 7:00 p.m., CBSSN	Nevada	W 101–92 ^{OT}	16–12 (7–8)	Thomas & Mack Center (14,640); Paradise, NV
02/23/2016; 8:00 p.m., ESPNU	at Boise State	L 69–81	16–13 (7–9)	Taco Bell Arena (4,605); Boise, ID
02/27/2016; 5:00 p.m., ESPN3	Wyoming	W 79–74	17–13 (8–9)	Thomas & Mack Center (12,412); Paradise, NV
03/05/2016; 7:00 p.m., CBSSN	at San Diego State	L 56–92	17–14 (8–10)	Viejas Arena (12,414); San Diego, CA
Mountain West tournament
03/09/2016; 1:30 p.m., MWN	Air Force; First round	W 108–102 ^{3OT}	18–14	Thomas & Mack Center (5,970); Paradise, NV
03/10/2016; 6:00 p.m., CBSSN	Fresno State; Quarterfinals	L 82–95	18–15	Thomas & Mack Center (6,325); Paradise, NV
*Non-conference game. ^{#}Rankings from AP poll. (#) Tournament seedings in parentheses. All times are in Pacific Time.
