= 2015–16 UC Riverside Highlanders men's basketball team =

American college basketball season

2015–16 UC Riverside Highlanders men's basketball
- Conference: Big West Conference
- Record: 14–19 (5–11 Big West)
- Head coach: Dennis Cutts (3rd season)
- Assistant coaches: Justin Bell; Keith Wilkinson; Brett Lauer
- Home arena: Student Recreation Center Arena

2015–16 Big West men's basketball standings
	Conf.				Overall
Team	W		L	PCT	W		L	PCT
Hawai'i †	13	–	3	.813	28	–	6	.824
UC Irvine	13	–	3	.813	28	–	10	.737
Long Beach State	12	–	4	.750	20	–	15	.571
UC Santa Barbara	11	–	5	.688	19	–	14	.576
UC Davis	6	–	10	.375	11	–	19	.367
UC Riverside	5	–	11	.313	14	–	19	.424
Cal State Northridge*	5	–	11	.313	10	–	20	.333
Cal Poly	4	–	12	.250	10	–	20	.333
Cal State Fullerton	3	–	13	.188	10	–	20	.333
† 2016 Big West tournament winner *ineligible for postseason due to self-imposed ban due to academic fraud violations

The 2015–16 UC Riverside Highlanders men's basketball team represented the University of California, Riverside during the 2015–16 NCAA Division I men's basketball season. The Highlanders were led by third year head coach Dennis Cutts and played their home games at the Student Recreation Center Arena as members of the Big West Conference. They finished the season 14–19, 5–11 in Big West play to finish in a tie for sixth place. They lost in the first round of the Big West tournament to Long Beach State.

== Roster ==
2015–16 UC Riverside Highlanders men's basketball team
Players
Coaches

Pos.	#	Name	Height	Weight	Year	Previous school	Hometown
G	0	Gentrey Thomas	6 ft 4 in (1.93 m)	190 lb (86 kg)	Jr	Orangeville HS	East Preston, Nova Scotia, Canada
G	1	Jaylen Bland	6 ft 3 in (1.91 m)	205 lb (93 kg)	Sr	Cleveland HS; Murray State; College of the Canyons	Saginaw, MI
G	3	Chance Murray	6 ft 3 in (1.91 m)	195 lb (88 kg)	Jr	Price HS	Los Angeles, CA
F	5	Taylor Johns	6 ft 7 in (2.01 m)	220 lb (100 kg)	Sr	Sacred Heart Prep	San Francisco, CA
G	10	Steven Jones	6 ft 0 in (1.83 m)	175 lb (79 kg)	Sr	Taft HS	Northridge, CA
G	11	DJ Sylvester	6 ft 3 in (1.91 m)	175 lb (79 kg)	Fr	Morse HS	Victorville, CA
F	12	Robert Boezeman	6 ft 7 in (2.01 m)	220 lb (100 kg)	So	Canarias Basketball Academy	Dordrecht, Netherlands
F	13	Eric Rhahwire	6 ft 5 in (1.96 m)	210 lb (95 kg)	Fr	Saddleback Valley Christian	Toronto, Canada
F	15	Brady Anderson	6 ft 9 in (2.06 m)	200 lb (91 kg)	So	Jesuit HS	Sacramento, CA
F	20	Secean Johnson	6 ft 5 in (1.96 m)	200 lb (91 kg)	Jr	Penn Wood HS	Philadelphia, PA
F	21	Alex Larrson	6 ft 9 in (2.06 m)	245 lb (111 kg)	So	Södertälje Knights Club Team	Södertälje, Sweden
G	22	Malik Thames	6 ft 2 in (1.88 m)	160 lb (73 kg)	Jr	Pleasant Grove	Sacramento, CA
G	24	Koh Flippin	6 ft 2 in (1.88 m)	165 lb (75 kg)	Fr	North Torrance HS	Torrance, CA
F	31	Primivito Gomez	6 ft 5 in (1.96 m)	210 lb (95 kg)	Jr	Arroyo HS	El Monte, CA
C	32	Menno Djikstra	7 ft 0 in (2.13 m)	225 lb (102 kg)	Fr	Canarias Basketball Academy	Standdaarbuiten, Netherlands

Head coach

- Dennis Cutts (Albany)

Assistant coach(es)

- Justin Bell (UC Riverside)
- Keith Wilkinson (USC)
- Brett Lauer (UC Irvine)

Legend

- (C) Team captain
- (S) Suspended
- (I) Ineligible
- (W) Walk-on
- Injured
- Current redshirt

Roster
Last update: 2015-12-05

== Schedule and results ==
Date time, TV	Rank^{#}	Opponent^{#}	Result	Record	Site (attendance) city, state
Exhibition
11/06/2015*; 7:00 pm		Port Loma Nazarene	W 70–59		Student Recreation Center Arena (405); Riverside, CA
Non-conference games
11/14/2015*; 4:00 pm		William Jessup	W 100–68	1–0	SRC Arena (2,247); Riverside, CA
11/19/2015*; 7:00 pm		Santa Clara	W 77–63	2–0	SRC Arena (486); Riverside, CA
11/21/2015*; 7:00 pm		at San Francisco; Roundball Showcase	L 57–58	2–1	War Memorial Gymnasium (1,641); San Francisco, CA
11/24/2015*; 7:00 pm		Delaware State; Roundball Showcase	W 81–55	3–1	SRC Arena (562); Riverside, CA
11/27/2015*; 5:00 pm		at Rice; Roundball Showcase	L 81–87	3–2	Tudor Fieldhouse (1,169); Houston, TX
11/29/2015*; 12:00 pm		at Lamar; Roundball Showcase	W 74–69	4–2	Montagne Center (1,481); Beaumont, TX
12/03/2015*; 7:00 pm		Northern Colorado	W 77–66	5–2	SRC Arena (603); Riverside, CA
12/06/2015*; 3:00 pm		at Loyola Marymount	L 76–77	5–3	Gersten Pavilion (1,817); Los Angeles, CA
12/12/2015*; 4:00 pm		UNLV	L 62–73	5–4	SRC Arena (1,772); Riverside, CA
12/15/2015*; 5:00 pm		at Houston Baptist	L 59–72	5–5	Sharp Gymnasium (532); Houston, TX
12/18/2015*; 5:00 pm		at Abilene Christian	W 60–56	6–5	Moody Coliseum (1,002); Abilene, TX
12/20/2015*; 7:00 pm		Life Pacific	W 95–48	7–5	SRC Arena (244); Riverside, CA
12/22/2015*; 7:00 pm		Denver	W 63–54	8–5	SRC Arena (373); Riverside, CA
12/28/2015*; 10:00 am		at Morgan State	W 81–72	9–5	Talmadge L. Hill Field House (79); Baltimore, MD
12/30/2015*; 4:00 pm		at Ohio	L 59–81	9–6	Convocation Center (5,267); Athens, OH
01/02/2015*; 5:00 pm		Cal State Bakersfield	L 48–67	9–7	SRC Arena (321); Riverside, CA
01/07/2016; 8:00 pm, ESPN3		Cal State Fullerton	L 73–79	9–8 (0–1)	SRC Arena (818); Riverside, CA
01/09/2016; 7:00 pm		at UC Irvine	L 68–84	9–9 (0–2)	Bren Events Center (4,233); Irvine, CA
01/14/2016; 7:00 pm		Hawaii	L 71–80	9–10 (0–3)	SRC Arena (1,596); Riverside, CA
01/16/2016; 7:30 pm, BigWest.TV		Cal State Northridge	W 75–72	10–10 (1–3)	Matadome (1,103); Northridge, CA
01/21/2016; 7:00 pm		at UC Davis	L 55–58	10–11 (1–4)	The Pavilion (2,247); Davis, CA
01/23/2016; 4:00 pm		Long Beach State	W 74–72	11–11 (2–4)	SRC Arena (935); Riverside, CA
01/28/2016; 7:00 pm		at Cal Poly	W 72–68	12–11 (3–4)	Mott Gym (2,134); San Luis Obispo, CA
01/30/2016; 7:00 pm		at Cal State Fullerton	W 81–71	13–11 (4–4)	Titan Gym (3,489); Fullerton, CA
02/03/2016; 7:00 pm		at Cal State Northridge	L 71–73	13–12 (4–5)	SRC Arena (884); Riverside, CA
02/6/2016; 7:00 pm		UC Davis	L 49–50	13–13 (4–6)	SRC Arena (572); Riverside, CA
02/13/2016; 7:30 pm, Prime Ticket		Cal Poly	L 78–86	13–14 (4–7)	SRC Arena (625); Riverside, CA
02/18/2015; 8:00 pm		UC Santa Barbara	L 55–65	13–15 (4–8)	SRC Arena (665); Riverside, CA
02/25/2016; 9:00 pm		at Hawaii	W 77–71	14–15 (5–8)	Stan Sheriff Center (7,957); Honolulu, HI
02/27/2016; 4:00 pm		at Long Beach State	L 55–66	14–16 (5–9)	Walter Pyramid (2,804); Long Beach, CA
03/03/2016; 7:00 pm		at UC Santa Barbara	L 55–81	14–17 (5–10)	UC Santa Barbara Events Center (2,075); Santa Barbara, CA
03/05/2016; 2:00 pm		UC Irvine	L 66–76	14–18 (5–11)	SRC Arena (766); Riverside, CA
Big West Tournament
03/10/2016; 8:30 pm, Prime Ticket	(6)	vs. (3) Long Beach State; Quarterfinals	L 74–82	14–19	Honda Center; Anaheim, CA
*Non-conference game. ^{#}Rankings from AP Poll. (#) Tournament seedings in parentheses. All times are in Pacific Time (#) Tournament seedings in parentheses..
