= 2015–16 UC Santa Barbara Gauchos men's basketball team =

American college basketball season

2015–16 UC Santa Barbara Gauchos men's basketball

Vegas 16, Semifinals
- Conference: Big West Conference
- Record: 19–14 (11–5 Big West)
- Head coach: Bob Williams (18th season)
- Assistant coaches: Matt Stock; Kevin Bromley; Ryan Madry
- Home arena: The Thunderdome

2015–16 Big West men's basketball standings
	Conf.				Overall
Team	W		L	PCT	W		L	PCT
Hawai'i †	13	–	3	.813	28	–	6	.824
UC Irvine	13	–	3	.813	28	–	10	.737
Long Beach State	12	–	4	.750	20	–	15	.571
UC Santa Barbara	11	–	5	.688	19	–	14	.576
UC Davis	6	–	10	.375	11	–	19	.367
UC Riverside	5	–	11	.313	14	–	19	.424
Cal State Northridge*	5	–	11	.313	10	–	20	.333
Cal Poly	4	–	12	.250	10	–	20	.333
Cal State Fullerton	3	–	13	.188	10	–	20	.333
† 2016 Big West tournament winner *ineligible for postseason due to self-imposed ban due to academic fraud violations

The 2015–16 UC Santa Barbara Gauchos men's basketball team represented the University of California, Santa Barbara during the 2015–16 NCAA Division I men's basketball season. The Gauchos, led by 18th year head coach Bob Williams, played their home games at the UC Santa Barbara Events Center, nicknamed the Thunderdome, as members of the Big West Conference. They finished the season with a record of 19–14, 11–5 in Big West play to finish in fourth place. They defeated UC Davis in the quarterfinals of the Big West tournament to advance to the semifinals, where they lost to Hawaii. They were invited to the inaugural Vegas 16, which featured only eight teams, where they defeated Northern Illinois to advance to the semifinals, where they lost to Old Dominion.

== Roster ==
2015–16 UC Santa Barbara Gauchos men's basketball team
Players
Coaches

Pos.	#	Name	Height	Weight	Year	Previous school	Hometown
F	0	Jarriesse Blackmon	6 ft 7 in (2.01 m)	200 lb (91 kg)	RS Fr	Layton HS	Layton, UT
G	1	Eric Childress	6 ft 0 in (1.83 m)	175 lb (79 kg)	Jr	Leuzinger HS	Hawthorne, CA
G	2	Gabe Vincent	6 ft 3 in (1.91 m)	190 lb (86 kg)	So	St. Mary's HS	Stockton, CA
G	3	Grant Troutt	6 ft 1 in (1.85 m)	190 lb (86 kg)	Fr	Episcopal School	Dallas, TX
G	5	Tide Osifeso	5 ft 10 in (1.78 m)	155 lb (70 kg)	Fr	Los Osos HS	Rancho Cucamonga, CA
F	10	Maxwell Kupchak	6 ft 7 in (2.01 m)	205 lb (93 kg)	Fr	Brentwood School	Los Angeles, CA
G	11	T. J. Taylor	5 ft 9 in (1.75 m)	160 lb (73 kg)	Sr	Oakland HS	Oakland, CA
F	12	Alex Hart	6 ft 10 in (2.08 m)	215 lb (98 kg)	So	Immaculata HS	Kelowna, B.C.
G	13	DaJuan Smith	6 ft 3 in (1.91 m)	175 lb (79 kg)	Sr	Abbeville HS; Mount San Jacinto College	Abbeville, LA
F	14	Ami Lakoju	6 ft 8 in (2.03 m)	265 lb (120 kg)	Fr	St. Luke's School	Harlem, NY
F	21	Mitch Brewe	6 ft 8 in (2.03 m)	242 lb (110 kg)	Sr	Seattle Preparatory School	Seattle, WA
G	23	Sam Walters	6 ft 2 in (1.88 m)	170 lb (77 kg)	Fr	Soquel HS	Soquel, CA
G	24	Michael Bryson	6 ft 4 in (1.93 m)	201 lb (91 kg)	Sr	Foothill HS	Sacramento, CA
G/F	25	Justin Burks	6 ft 6 in (1.98 m)	210 lb (95 kg)	Fr	Arbor View HS	Las Vegas, NV
G/F	31	John Green	6 ft 5 in (1.96 m)	180 lb (82 kg)	RS Sr	Westwind Preparatory Academy	Oakland, CA
F	32	J. D. Slajchert	7 ft 2 in (2.18 m)	283 lb (128 kg)	Fr	Phillip Exeter School	Oak Park, CA
C	35	Tyler Jackson	6 ft 6 in (1.98 m)	215 lb (98 kg)	Fr	South Kent (Conn.) School	Naperville, IL
G	43	Joey Goodreault	6 ft 3 in (1.91 m)	175 lb (79 kg)	Fr	Miramonte HS	Orinda, CA
F	44	Sam Beeler	6 ft 10 in (2.08 m)	210 lb (95 kg)	Sr	Poway HS	Poway, CA

Head coach

- Bob Williams (San José State)

Assistant coach(es)

- Matt Stock (UC Santa Barbara)
- Kevin Bromley (Colorado State)
- Ryan Madry (West Georgia)

Legend

- (C) Team captain
- (S) Suspended
- (I) Ineligible
- (W) Walk-on
- Injured
- Current redshirt

Roster
Last update: 2015-12-06

== Schedule and results ==
Date time, TV	Rank^{#}	Opponent^{#}	Result	Record	Site (attendance) city, state
Exhibition game
11/08/2015*; 5:30 pm		San Francisco State	W 66–45		The Thunderdome; Santa Barbara, CA
Non-conference games
11/13/2015*; 7:00 pm		at Nebraska–Omaha	W 60–59	1–0	Baxter Arena (3,538); Omaha, NE
11/16/2015*; 7:00 pm, P12N		at No. 15 California	L 67–85	1–1	Haas Pavilion (8,847); Berkeley, CA
11/21/2015*; 2:00 pm		Oregon State	L 59–71	1–2	The Thunderdome (2,108); Santa Barbara, CA
11/25/2015*; 7:30 pm		at San Francisco	W 68–61	2–2	Sobrato Center (1,452); San Francisco, CA
11/29/2015*; 9:00 pm, P12N		at Arizona State	L 68–70	2–3	Wells Fargo Arena (4,026); Tempe, AZ
12/03/2015*; 7:00 pm		USC	L 63–75	2–4	The Thunderdome (3,585); Santa Barbara, CA
12/13/2015*; 12:00 pm, ESPN3		at South Dakota State	L 67–86	2–5	Frost Arena (2,155); Brookings, SD
12/16/2015*; 4:00 pm		at Vermont	L 68–75	2–6	Patrick Gym (1,776); Burlington, VT
12/21/2015*; 12:00 pm		vs. Akron; South Point Holiday Hoops Classic	L 70–84	2–7	South Point Arena (250); Enterprise, NV
12/22/2015*; 12:00 pm		vs. Iona; South Point Holiday Hoops Classic	W 80–76	3–7	South Point Arena (250); Enterprise, NV
12/28/2015*; 8:00 pm, P12N		at Washington	W 83–78	4–7	Alaska Airlines Arena (7,376); Seattle, WA
12/30/2015*; 7:00 pm		at Seattle	W 88–50	5–7	KeyArena (1,383); Seattle, WA
01/02/2016*; 4:00 pm		Point Loma Nazarene	W 87–46	6–7	The Thunderdome (1,071); Santa Barbara, CA
Conference games
01/09/2016; 9:00 pm		at Hawaii	L 57–65	6–8 (0–1)	Stan Sheriff Center (7,627); Honolulu, HI
01/14/2016; 7:00 pm		at Cal Poly	W 76–73	7–8 (1–1)	Mott Athletic Center (3,032); San Luis Obispo, CA
01/16/2016; 4:00 pm		UC Irvine	W 61–52	7–9 (1–2)	The Thunderdome (3,527); Santa Barbara, CA
01/20/2016; 7:00 pm		Long Beach State	L 67–77	7–10 (1–3)	The Thunderdome (1,975); Santa Barbara, CA
01/23/2016; 4:00 pm		Cal State Northridge	W 74–61	8–10 (2–3)	The Thunderdome (1,693); Santa Barbara, CA
01/28/2016; 7:30 pm, Prime Ticket		at Long Beach State	L 70–80	8–11 (2–4)	Walter Pyramid (3,064); Long Beach, CA
01/30/2016; 7:00 pm, ESPNU		at UC Irvine	W 76–60	9–11 (3–4)	Bren Events Center (5,000); Irvine, CA
02/04/2016; 7:00 pm		Hawaii	L 64–76	9–12 (3–5)	The Thunderdome (1,722); Santa Barbara, CA
02/06/2016; 7:00 pm		Cal State Fullerton	W 81–68	10–12 (4–5)	The Thunderdome (1,726); Santa Barbara, CA
02/11/2016; 7:00 pm		at UC Davis	W 72–66	11–12 (5–5)	The Pavilion (2,205); Davis, CA
02/18/2016; 8:00 pm		at UC Riverside	W 65–55	12–12 (6–5)	UC Riverside Student Recreation Center (665); Riverside, CA
02/20/2016; 7:00 pm		UC Davis	W 62–55	13–12 (7–5)	The Thunderdome (2,116); Santa Barbara, CA
02/25/2016; 7:30 pm, Prime Ticket		at Cal State Northridge	W 78–63	14–12 (8–5)	Matadome (1,290); Northridge, CA
02/27/2016; 6:00 pm, ESPN3		at Cal State Fullerton	W 80–62	15–12 (9–5)	Titan Gym (928); Fullerton, CA
03/03/2016; 7:00 pm		UC Riverside	W 81–55	16–12 (10–5)	The Thunderdome (2,075); Santa Barbara, CA
03/04/2016; 4:00 pm		Cal Poly	W 69–50	17–12 (11–5)	The Thunderdome (4,387); Santa Barbara, CA
Big West tournament
03/10/2016; 2:30 pm, Prime Ticket	(4)	vs. (5) UC Davis; Quarterfinals	W 81–55	18–12	Honda Center (2,075); Anaheim, CA
03/10/2016; 6:30 pm, ESPN3	(4)	vs. (1) Hawaii; Semifinals	L 76–88	18–13	Honda Center (5,134); Anaheim, CA
Vegas 16
03/28/2016*; 2:30 pm, CBSSN		vs. Northern Illinois; Quarterfinals	W 70–63	19–13	Mandalay Bay Events Center; Paradise, NV
03/29/2016*; 6:00 pm, CBSSN		vs. Old Dominion; Semifinals	L 49–64	19–14	Mandalay Bay Events Center; Paradise, NV
*Non-conference game. ^{#}Rankings from AP Poll. (#) Tournament seedings in parentheses. All times are in Pacific Time (#) Tournament seedings in parentheses..
