= 2015–16 Montana State Bobcats men's basketball team =

American college basketball season

2015–16 Montana State Bobcats men's basketball
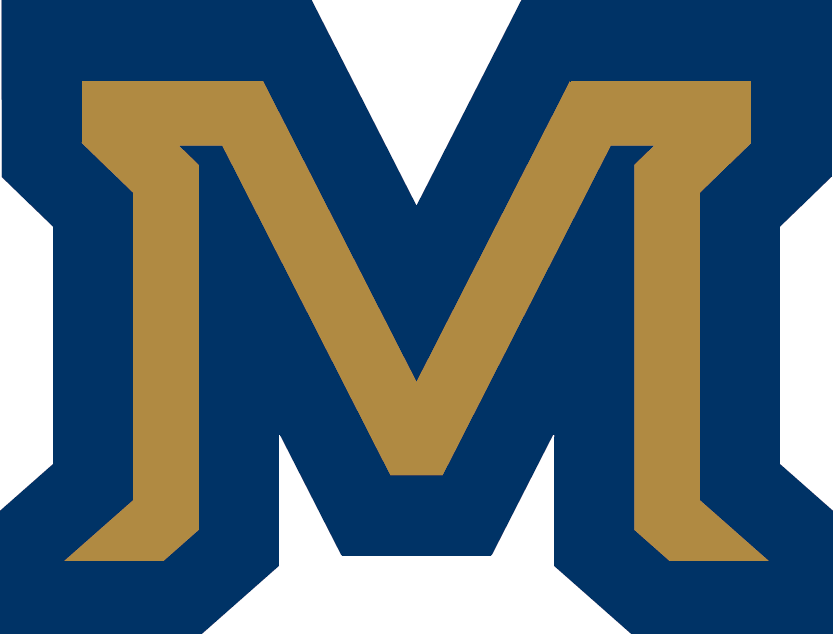
- Conference: Big Sky Conference
- Record: 14–17 (9–9 Big Sky)
- Head coach: Brian Fish (2nd season)
- Assistant coaches: Kenya Crandell; Chris Haslam; Brandon Lincoln
- Home arena: Worthington Arena

2015–16 Big Sky men's basketball standings
| | Conf. | | | | Overall |
| Team | W | | L | PCT | W | | L | PCT |
|---|---|---|---|---|---|---|---|---|
| Weber State † | 15 | – | 3 | .833 | 26 | – | 9 | .743 |
| Montana | 14 | – | 4 | .778 | 21 | – | 12 | .636 |
| Idaho | 12 | – | 6 | .667 | 21 | – | 13 | .618 |
| Idaho State | 11 | – | 7 | .611 | 16 | – | 15 | .516 |
| Eastern Washington | 10 | – | 8 | .556 | 18 | – | 16 | .529 |
| North Dakota | 10 | – | 8 | .556 | 17 | – | 16 | .515 |
| Montana State | 9 | – | 9 | .500 | 14 | – | 17 | .452 |
| Portland State | 8 | – | 10 | .444 | 13 | – | 18 | .419 |
| Northern Colorado | 7 | – | 11 | .389 | 10 | – | 21 | .323 |
| Sacramento State | 6 | – | 12 | .333 | 14 | – | 17 | .452 |
| Northern Arizona | 3 | – | 15 | .167 | 5 | – | 25 | .167 |
| Southern Utah | 3 | – | 15 | .167 | 5 | – | 24 | .172 |
† Conference tournament winner

The 2015–16 Montana State Bobcats men's basketball team represented Montana State University during the 2015–16 NCAA Division I men's basketball season. The Bobcats, led by second year head coach Brian Fish, played their home games at Worthington Arena and were members of the Big Sky Conference. They finished the season 14–17, 9–9 in Big Sky play to finish in seventh place. They lost in the first round of the Big Sky tournament to Sacramento State.

== Previous season ==
The Bobcats finished the season 7–23, 4–14 in Big Sky play to finish in a three-way tie for tenth place. They failed to qualify for the Big Sky tournament.

== Departures ==
| Name | Number | Pos. | Height | Weight | Year | Hometown | Notes |
|---|---|---|---|---|---|---|---|
| Blake Brumwell | 2 | C | 6'7" | 250 | RS Senior | Big Sandy, MT | Graduated |
| Michael Dison | 3 | G | 5'9" | 160 | Senior | Houston, TX | Graduated |
| Joseph Frenchwood IV | 4 | G | 6'1" | 175 | Freshman | Newark, CA | Transferred to Hill College |
| Terrell Brown | 13 | F | 6'4" | 200 | RS Junior | Colorado Springs, CO | Transferred |
| Ryan Shannon | 20 | F | 6'8" | 225 | RS Sophomore | Marysville, WA | Left the team for personal reasons |
| Eric Norman | 24 | F | 6'9" | 220 | Senior | San Diego, CA | Graduated |
| Bradley Fisher | 41 | C | 7'0" | 245 | Freshman | Chorley, England | Transferred to Emporia State |

=== Incoming transfers ===
| Name | Number | Pos. | Height | Weight | Year | Hometown | Previous School |
|---|---|---|---|---|---|---|---|
| Nahjee Matlock | 10 | G | 5'11" | 180 | Junior | Las Vegas, NV | Junior college transferred from Tohono O'odham Community College |
| Tyson Kanseyo | 11 | F | 6'8" | 215 | Sophomore | Malden, Netherlands | Junior college transferred from Laramie County Community College |
| Sarp Gobeloglu | 13 | F | 6'10" | 210 | Junior | Istanbul, Turkey | Junior college transferred from Gillette College |
| Quinton Everett | 24 | G | 6'2" | 195 | Junior | Lakeland, FL | Junior college transferred from Gillette College |
| Shikei Blake | 25 | F | 6'7" | 240 | Junior | Wilmington, DE | Junior college transferred from Northeastern Junior College |

== 2015 incoming recruits ==
College recruiting information
| Name | Hometown | School | Height | Weight | Commit date |
|---|---|---|---|---|---|
| Tyler Hall #51 SG | Rock Island, IL | Rock Island High School | 6 ft 3 in (1.91 m) | 185 lb (84 kg) | Sep 15, 2014 |
| Tyler Hall #51 SG | Recruit ratings: Scout: Rivals: (78) | | | | |
| Mandrell Worthy #80 SG | Sammamish, WA | Eastside Catholic School | 6 ft 2 in (1.88 m) | 180 lb (82 kg) | Sep 30, 2014 |
| Mandrell Worthy #80 SG | Recruit ratings: Scout: Rivals: (73) | | | | |
| Sam Neumann; SF | Saint Paul, MN | Cretin-Derham Hall High School | 6 ft 6 in (1.98 m) | 200 lb (91 kg) | Sep 27, 2014 |
| Sam Neumann; SF | Recruit ratings: Scout: Rivals: (73) | | | | |
Overall recruit ranking:
Note: In many cases, Scout, Rivals, 247Sports, On3, and ESPN may conflict in their listings of height and weight.; In these cases, the average was taken. ESPN grades are on a 100-point scale.; Sources: "2015 Team Ranking". Rivals.

== Roster ==
2015–16 Montana State Bobcats men's basketball team
Players
Coaches

| Pos. | # | Name | Height | Weight | Year | Previous school | Hometown |
|---|---|---|---|---|---|---|---|
| G | 0 | Zach Green | 6 ft 4 in (1.93 m) | 195 lb (88 kg) | So | Mesquite | Gilbert, AZ |
| G | 1 | Stephan Holm | 6 ft 3 in (1.91 m) | 175 lb (79 kg) | Jr | Riverton | Riverton, UT |
| G | 3 | Tyler Hall | 6 ft 4 in (1.93 m) | 175 lb (79 kg) | Fr | Rock Island | Rock Island, IL |
| F | 4 | Sam Neumann | 6 ft 7 in (2.01 m) | 200 lb (91 kg) | Fr | Cretin-Durham Hall | Saint Paul, MN |
| G | 10 | Nahjee Mathlock | 5 ft 11 in (1.8 m) | 185 lb (84 kg) | Jr | Palo Verde; Tohono O'odham CC | Las Vegas, NV |
| F | 11 | Tyson Kanseyo | 6 ft 8 in (2.03 m) | 220 lb (100 kg) | So | 22 Feet Academy; Laramie County CC | Malden, Netherlands |
| F | 13 | Sarp Gobeloglu | 6 ft 10 in (2.08 m) | 205 lb (93 kg) | Jr | FMV Igile; Gillette College | Ankara, Turkey |
| G | 15 | Mandrell Worthy | 6 ft 2 in (1.88 m) | 180 lb (82 kg) | Fr | Eastside Catholic | Federal Way, WA |
| G | 22 | Marcus Colbert | 5 ft 11 in (1.8 m) | 180 lb (82 kg) | Sr | Post Falls | Post Falls, ID |
| G | 24 | Quinton Everett | 6 ft 3 in (1.91 m) | 195 lb (88 kg) | Jr | Lakeland; Gillette College | Lakeland, FL |
| C | 25 | Shikei Blake | 6 ft 7 in (2.01 m) | 225 lb (102 kg) | Jr | Newark; Northeastern JC | Wilmington, DE |
| F | 33 | Quinn Price | 6 ft 9 in (2.06 m) | 205 lb (93 kg) | So | Vista Grande | Casa Grande, AZ |
| F | 34 | Danny Robison | 6 ft 8 in (2.03 m) | 225 lb (102 kg) | Sr | Billings West | Billings, MT |

Head coach

- Brian Fish (Marshall)

Assistant coach(es)

- Kenya Crandell (Nebraska–Kearney)
- Chris Haslam (Wyoming)
- Brandon Lincoln (Oregon)

Legend

- (C) Team captain
- (S) Suspended
- (I) Ineligible
- (W) Walk-on
- Injured
- Current redshirt

Roster

== Schedule ==
| Date time, TV | Opponent | Result | Record | Site (attendance) city, state |
Exhibition
| 11/03/2015*; 7:05 pm | Northwest Indian | W 114–57 | | Worthington Arena; Bozeman, MT |
Non-conference regular season
| 11/13/2015*; 10:35 pm | at Hawaii; Rainbow Classic | L 76–87 | 0–1 | Stan Sheriff Center (6,259); Honolulu, HI |
| 11/14/2015*; 5:00 pm | vs. Hawaii–Hilo; Rainbow Classic | W 90–85 | 1–1 | Stan Sheriff Center; Honolulu, HI |
| 11/15/2015*; 5:00 pm | vs. Nevada; Rainbow Classic | L 62–83 | 1–2 | Stan Sheriff Center (5,271); Honolulu, HI |
| 11/20/2015*; 8:05 pm | San Jose State | W 81–69 | 2–2 | Worthington Arena (1,806); Bozeman, MT |
| 11/22/2015*; 2:05 pm | vs. Wyoming; Billings Showcase | W 83–82 | 3–2 | Rimrock Auto Arena (4,207); Billings, MT |
| 11/28/2015*; 7:00 pm | at Wyoming | L 68–82 | 3–3 | Arena-Auditorium (5,022); Laramie, WY |
| 12/01/2015*; 7:00 pm | at Utah Valley | W 76–72 | 4–3 | UCCU Center (1,135); Orem, UT |
| 12/06/2015*; 1:05 pm | Nebraska–Omaha | L 97–100 | 4–4 | Worthington Arena (1,533); Bozeman, MT |
| 12/13/2015*; 3:00 pm | at San Jose State | W 91–83 | 5–4 | Event Center Arena (1,116); San Jose, CA |
| 12/16/2015*; 6:00 pm | at North Dakota State | L 97–100 | 5–5 | Scheels Arena (1,533); Fargo, ND |
| 12/19/2015*; 12:00 pm | at Buffalo | L 73–80 | 5–6 | Alumni Arena (2,384); Amherst, NY |
| 12/22/2015*; 5:00 pm, ESPN3 | at Syracuse | L 60–82 | 5–7 | Carrier Dome (17,202); Syracuse, NY |
Big Sky regular season
| 12/31/2015; 7:05 pm | at Southern Utah | L 82–93 | 5–8 (0–1) | Centrum Arena (941); Cedar City, UT |
| 01/02/2016; 12:05 pm | at Northern Arizona | W 74–72 ^{OT} | 6–8 (1–1) | Walkup Skydome (1,007); Flagstaff, AZ |
| 01/07/2016; 7:05 pm | Sacramento State | W 71–64 | 7–8 (2–1) | Worthington Arena (2,036); Bozeman, MT |
| 01/09/2016; 2:05 pm | Portland State | L 70–77 | 7–9 (2–2) | Worthington Arena (2,233); Bozeman, MT |
| 01/14/2016; 6:05 pm | at North Dakota | L 68–85 | 7–10 (2–3) | Betty Engelstad Sioux Center (1,608); Grand Forks, ND |
| 01/16/2016; 5:05 pm | at Northern Colorado | L 76–78 | 7–11 (2–4) | Bank of Colorado Arena (1,120); Greeley, CO |
| 01/21/2016; 7:05 pm | Eastern Washington | W 85–71 | 8–11 (3–4) | Worthington Arena (2,362); Bozeman, MT |
| 01/23/2016; 2:05 pm | Idaho | W 70–68 | 9–11 (4–4) | Worthington Arena (2,435); Bozeman, MT |
| 01/30/2016; 7:05 pm | Montana | L 72–80 | 9–12 (4–5) | Worthington Arena (5,407); Bozeman, MT |
| 02/04/2016; 8:05 pm | at Portland State | L 68–83 | 9–13 (4–6) | Peter Stott Center (623); Portland, OR |
| 02/06/2016; 8:05 pm | at Sacramento State | W 79–76 | 10–13 (5–6) | Colberg Court (929); Sacramento, CA |
| 02/11/2016; 7:05 pm | Northern Arizona | W 101–58 | 11–13 (6–6) | Worthington Arena (2,275); Bozeman, MT |
| 02/13/2016; 2:05 pm | Southern Utah | W 80–73 | 12–13 (7–6) | Worthington Arena (2,624); Bozeman, MT |
| 02/20/2016; 7:05 pm | at Montana | L 78–87 | 12–14 (7–7) | Dahlberg Arena (6,522); Missoula, MT |
| 02/25/2016; 7:05 pm | at Weber State | L 60–68 | 12–15 (7–8) | Dee Events Center (7,340); Ogden, UT |
| 02/27/2016; 7:05 pm | at Idaho State | L 69–76 | 12–16 (7–9) | Reed Gym (2,566); Pocatello, ID |
| 03/03/2016; 7:05 pm | Northern Colorado | W 81–63 | 13–16 (8–9) | Worthington Arena (2,227); Bozeman, MT |
| 03/05/2016; 2:05 pm | North Dakota | W 89–82 | 14–16 (9–9) | Worthington Arena (2,585); Bozeman, MT |
Big Sky tournament
| 03/08/2016; 6:30 pm | vs. Sacramento State | L 75–79 | 14–17 | Reno Events Center (1,723); Reno, NV |
*Non-conference game. ^{#}Rankings from AP Poll. (#) Tournament seedings in parentheses. All times are in Mountain Time.

== See also ==
2015–16 Montana State Bobcats women's basketball team
