= 2015–16 Southern Utah Thunderbirds men's basketball team =

American college basketball season

2015–16 Southern Utah Thunderbirds men's basketball
- Conference: Big Sky Conference
- Record: 5–24 (3–15 Big Sky)
- Head coach: Nick Robinson (4th season)
- Assistant coaches: Chad Bell; Todd Okeson; Drew Allen
- Home arena: Centrum Arena

2015–16 Big Sky men's basketball standings
	Conf.				Overall
Team	W		L	PCT	W		L	PCT
Weber State †	15	–	3	.833	26	–	9	.743
Montana	14	–	4	.778	21	–	12	.636
Idaho	12	–	6	.667	21	–	13	.618
Idaho State	11	–	7	.611	16	–	15	.516
Eastern Washington	10	–	8	.556	18	–	16	.529
North Dakota	10	–	8	.556	17	–	16	.515
Montana State	9	–	9	.500	14	–	17	.452
Portland State	8	–	10	.444	13	–	18	.419
Northern Colorado	7	–	11	.389	10	–	21	.323
Sacramento State	6	–	12	.333	14	–	17	.452
Northern Arizona	3	–	15	.167	5	–	25	.167
Southern Utah	3	–	15	.167	5	–	24	.172
† Conference tournament winner

The 2015–16 Southern Utah Thunderbirds basketball team represented Southern Utah University during the 2015–16 NCAA Division I men's basketball season. The Thunderbirds were led by fourth-year head coach Nick Robinson and played their home games at the Centrum Arena in Cedar City, Utah. They were members of the Big Sky Conference. The Thunderbirds finished the season 5–24, 3–15 in Big Sky play to finish in a tie for 11th place. They lost in the first round of the Big Sky tournament to North Dakota.

On March 9, 2016, head coach Nick Robinson was fired. He finished at SUU with a four-year record of 28–90. On March 22, the school hired Todd Simon as head coach.

== Previous season ==
The Thunderbirds finished the season 2014–15 season 10–19, 7–11 in Big Sky play to finish in ninth place. They failed to qualify for the Big Sky tournament.

== Departures ==
Name	Number	Pos.	Height	Weight	Year	Hometown	Notes
Austin Waddoups	2	G	6'2"	160	Freshman	American Fork, Utah	Transferred to Salt Lake CC
Tyler Rawson	21	F	6'9"	220	Freshman	American Fork, Utah	Transferred to Salt Lake CC
Sherron Wilson	22	G/F	6'6"	220	Freshman	Las Vegas, Nevada	Transferred to Paris JC
Eric Rippetoe	24	F	6'6"	215	Senior	Panaca, Nevada	Graduated
Cal Hanks	34	C	6'11"	240	Senior	Logan, Utah	Graduated

=== Incoming transfers ===
Name	Number	Pos.	Height	Weight	Year	Hometown	Previous School
Randy Onwuasor	2	G	6'3"	190	Junior	Inglewood, California	Transferred from Texas Tech. Under NCAA transfer rules, Onwuasor will have to sit out for the 2015–16 season. Will have two years of remaining eligibility.
Will Joyce	11	F	6'5"	220	Junior	Newark, New Jersey	Junior college transferred from New Mexico Military Institute

== 2015 incoming recruits ==
College recruiting information
Name	Hometown	School	Height	Weight	Commit date
Nicholas Pete #92 SF	Hemet, California	Tahquitz High School	6 ft 7 in (2.01 m)	185 lb (84 kg)	Aug 30, 2014
Nicholas Pete #92 SF	Recruit ratings: Scout: Rivals: (65)				
Brayden Holker #68 PF	Saratoga Springs, Utah	Westlake High School	6 ft 8 in (2.03 m)	215 lb (98 kg)	Oct 20, 2014
Brayden Holker #68 PF	Recruit ratings: Scout: Rivals: (65)				
Overall recruit ranking:
Note: In many cases, Scout, Rivals, 247Sports, On3, and ESPN may conflict in their listings of height and weight.; In these cases, the average was taken. ESPN grades are on a 100-point scale.; Sources: "2015 Team Ranking". Rivals.

== Roster ==
2015–16 Southern Utah Thunderbirds men's basketball team
Players
Coaches

Pos.	#	Name	Height	Weight	Year	Previous school	Hometown
G	2	Randy Onwausor (I) (redshirt)	6 ft 3 in (1.91 m)	210 lb (95 kg)	Jr	Inglewood HS; Texas Tech	Inglewood, California
G	3	Travon Langston	6 ft 3 in (1.91 m)	190 lb (86 kg)	Sr	Las Vegas HS; Utah State Eastern	Las Vegas, Nevada
G	4	Trey Kennedy	6 ft 3 in (1.91 m)	195 lb (88 kg)	Jr	Bishop Gorman HS	Las Vegas, Nevada
G	5	John Marshall	6 ft 1 in (1.85 m)	180 lb (82 kg)	Jr	Westwind Prep	Phoenix, Arizona
F	11	Will Joyce	6 ft 5 in (1.96 m)	205 lb (93 kg)	Jr	Newark East Side; New Mexico Military Institute	Newark, New Jersey
F	12	Daniel Melifonwu	6 ft 9 in (2.06 m)	220 lb (100 kg)	Fr	Balboa City Prep/Lincoln	San Diego, California
G	13	Race Parsons	6 ft 5 in (1.96 m)	185 lb (84 kg)	Jr	South Sevier HS	Monroe, Utah
G	14	James McGee (W)	6 ft 2 in (1.88 m)	180 lb (82 kg)	RS So	Mater Dei HS	San Clemente, California
G	15	Juwan Major	6 ft 3 in (1.91 m)	180 lb (82 kg)	Jr	Las Vegas HS	Las Vegas
G/F	25	Christian Thompson	6 ft 7 in (2.01 m)	180 lb (82 kg)	Sr	Arcadia HS; Tohono O’odham CC	Phoenix, Arizona
F	32	Casey Oliverson	6 ft 8 in (2.03 m)	225 lb (102 kg)	Sr	Sky View HS; Salt Lake CC	Logan, Utah
G/F	35	A. J. Hess (W)	6 ft 6 in (1.98 m)	210 lb (95 kg)	Sr	Phoenix Country Day	Carefree, Arizona

Head coach

- Nick Robinson (Stanford)

Assistant coach(es)

- Chad Bell (Nevada)
- Todd Okeson (Nevada)
- Drew Allen (Southern Utah)

Legend

- (C) Team captain
- (S) Suspended
- (I) Ineligible
- (W) Walk-on
- Injured
- Current redshirt

Roster

== Schedule ==
Date time, TV	Opponent	Result	Record	Site (attendance) city, state
Exhibition
12/12/2015*; 7:00 pm	Bristol University	W 79–41		Centrum Arena (1,133); Cedar City, Utah
Non-conference regular season
11/13/2015*; 7:30 pm, P12N	at No. 16 Utah; Old Oquirrh Bucket	L 71–82	0–1	Jon M. Huntsman Center (12,050); Salt Lake City, Utah
11/18/2015*; 8:30 pm	at UNLV	L 64–84	0–2	Thomas & Mack Center (10,824); Paradise, Nevada
11/21/2015*; 7:00 pm	UTSA	L 79–82	0–3	Centrum Arena (3,256); Cedar City, Utah
11/24/2015*; 7:00 pm	Cal State Fullerton	L 66–80	0–4	Centrum Arena (938); Cedar City, Utah
11/28/2015*; 11:00 am	at Eastern Kentucky	L 85–98	0–5	Alumni Coliseum (1,300); Richmond, Kentucky
12/03/2015*; 7:00 pm	La Verne	W 105–85	1–5	Centrum Arena (1,428); Cedar City, Utah
12/05/2015*; 7:00 pm	at Utah Valley; Old Oquirrh Bucket	W 68–54	2–5	UCCU Center (2,233); Orem, Utah
12/16/2015*; 8:00 pm	at Saint Mary's	L 36–92	2–6	McKeon Pavilion (1,836); Moraga, California
12/19/2015*; 11:00 am	at IUPUI	L 68–82	2–7	Fairgrounds Coliseum (886); Indianapolis, Indiana
12/22/2015*; 6:30 pm, FS2	at No. 9 Butler	L 52–88	2–8	Hinkle Fieldhouse (7,128); Indianapolis, Indiana
Big Sky regular season
12/31/2015; 4:00 pm	Montana State	W 93–82	3–8 (1–0)	Centrum Arena (941); Cedar City, Utah
01/02/2016; 7:00 pm	Montana	L 66–83	3–9 (1–1)	Centrum Arena (2,330); Cedar City, Utah
01/09/2016; 7:00 pm	Northern Arizona	L 63–73	3–10 (1–2)	Centrum Arena (3,011); Cedar City, Utah
01/14/2016; 7:05 pm	at Eastern Washington	L 80–106	3–11 (1–3)	Reese Court (1,572); Cheney, Washington
01/16/2016; 8:00 pm	at Idaho	W 85–83	4–11 (2–3)	Cowan Spectrum (1,456); Moscow, Idaho
01/21/2016; 7:00 pm	Northern Colorado	L 80–90	4–12 (2–4)	Centrum Arena (1,356); Cedar City, Utah
01/23/2016; 4:00 pm	North Dakota	L 72–88	4–13 (2–5)	Centrum Arena (1,337); Cedar City, Utah
01/28/2016; 7:00 pm	at Idaho State	L 68–87	4–14 (2–6)	Holt Arena (1,644); Pocatello, Idaho
01/30/2016; 7:00 pm	at Weber State; Old Oquirrh Bucket	L 50–77	4–15 (2–7)	Dee Events Center (7,052); Ogden, Utah
02/04/2016; 7:00 pm	Idaho	L 44–68	4–16 (2–8)	Centrum Arena (1,213); Cedar City, Utah
02/06/2016; 7:00 pm	Eastern Washington	L 67–81	4–17 (2–9)	Centrum Arena (1,309); Cedar City, Utah
02/11/2016; 7:00 pm	at Montana	L 53–86	4–18 (2–10)	Dahlberg Arena (3,351); Missoula, Montana
02/13/2015; 2:05 pm	at Montana State	L 73–80	4–19 (2–11)	Worthington Arena (2,624); Bozeman, Montana
02/18/2016; 7:00 pm	Weber State; Old Oquirrh Bucket	L 83–87	4–20 (2–12)	Centrum Arena (2,028); Cedar City, Utah
02/20/2016; 7:00 pm	Idaho State	L 71–89	4–21 (2–13)	Centrum Arena (1,568); Cedar City, Utah
02/27/2016; 2:00 pm	at Northern Arizona	W 69–59	5–21 (3–13)	Walkup Skydome (1,365); Flagstaff, Arizona
03/03/2016; 8:05 pm	at Sacramento State	L 63–69 ^{OT}	5–22 (3–14)	Colberg Court (689); Sacramento, California
03/05/2016; 8:05 pm	at Portland State	L 86–88	5–23 (3–15)	Peter Stott Center (622); Portland, Oregon
Big Sky tournament
03/08/2016; 3:30 pm	vs. North Dakota	L 80–85	5–24	Reno Events Center (1,406); Reno, Nevada
*Non-conference game. ^{#}Rankings from AP Poll. (#) Tournament seedings in parentheses. All times are in Mountain Time.
