= 2016 Big Sky Conference men's basketball tournament =

- Classification: Division I
- Season: 2015–16
- Teams: 12
- Site: Reno Events Center; Reno, Nevada
- Champions: Weber State (10th title)
- Winning coach: Randy Rahe (3rd title)
- MVP: Jeremy Senglin (Weber State)
- Television: ESPNU (final)

2015–16 Big Sky men's basketball standings
	Conf.				Overall
Team	W		L	PCT	W		L	PCT
Weber State †	15	–	3	.833	26	–	9	.743
Montana	14	–	4	.778	21	–	12	.636
Idaho	12	–	6	.667	21	–	13	.618
Idaho State	11	–	7	.611	16	–	15	.516
Eastern Washington	10	–	8	.556	18	–	16	.529
North Dakota	10	–	8	.556	17	–	16	.515
Montana State	9	–	9	.500	14	–	17	.452
Portland State	8	–	10	.444	13	–	18	.419
Northern Colorado	7	–	11	.389	10	–	21	.323
Sacramento State	6	–	12	.333	14	–	17	.452
Northern Arizona	3	–	15	.167	5	–	25	.167
Southern Utah	3	–	15	.167	5	–	24	.172
† Conference tournament winner

The 2016 Big Sky Conference men's basketball tournament was held March 7–12 at the Reno Events Center in Reno, Nevada. This was the first Big Sky tournament at a neutral site and the first to include all twelve conference members. The top two seeds met in the final; regular season champion Weber State defeated Montana 62–59 and advanced to the NCAA tournament.

== Seeds ==
All 12 Big Sky schools participated in the tournament. Teams were seeded by conference season record, with the top four teams receiving a first round bye. A tiebreaker system was used to seed teams with identical conference records.

Seed	School	Conference	Tiebreaker
1	Weber State	15–3	
2	Montana	14–4	
3	Idaho	12–6	
4	Idaho State	11–7	
5	North Dakota	10–8	1–1 vs. Weber State
6	Eastern Washington	10–8	0–1 vs. Weber State
7	Montana State	9–9	
8	Portland State	8–10	
9	Northern Colorado	7–11	
10	Sacramento State	6–12	
11	Northern Arizona	3–15	1–1 vs. Idaho State
12	Southern Utah	3–15	0–2 vs. Idaho State

== Schedule ==
Session	Game	Time*	Matchup^{#}	Score
First round – Tuesday, March 8
1	1	12:05 pm	#8 Portland State vs. #9 Northern Colorado	74–67
1	2	2:35 pm	#5 North Dakota vs. #12 Southern Utah	85–80
1	3	5:35 pm	#7 Montana State vs. #10 Sacramento State	75–79
1	4	8:05 pm	#6 Eastern Washington vs. #11 Northern Arizona	74–52
Quarterfinals – Thursday, March 10
2	5	12:05 pm	#1 Weber State vs. #8 Portland State	78–74
2	6	2:35 pm	#4 Idaho State vs. #5 North Dakota	49–83
2	7	5:35 pm	#2 Montana vs. #10 Sacramento State	70–53
2	8	8:05 pm	#3 Idaho vs. #6 Eastern Washington	77–73
Semifinals – Friday, March 11
3	9	5:35 pm	#1 Weber State vs. #5 North Dakota	83–78^{OT}
3	10	8:05 pm	#2 Montana vs. #3 Idaho	81–72
Championship – Saturday, March 12
4	10	5:45 pm	#1 Weber State vs. #2 Montana	62–59
*Game times in PT. #-Rankings denote tournament seeding.

== Bracket ==
First round Tuesday, March 8
8	Portland State	74
9	Northern Colorado	67
5	North Dakota	85
12	Southern Utah	80
7	Montana State	75
10	Sacramento State	79
6	Eastern Washington	74
11	Northern Arizona	52

Quarterfinals; Thursday, March 10
1	Weber State	78
8	Portland State	74
4	Idaho State	49
5	North Dakota	83
2	Montana	70
10	Sacramento State	53
3	Idaho	77
6	Eastern Washington	73

Semifinals; Friday, March 11
1	Weber State	83*
5	North Dakota	78
2	Montana	81
3	Idaho	72

Championship Game; Saturday, March 12
1	Weber State	62
2	Montana	59

* – denotes overtime period

== NCAA tournament ==
The Wildcats received the automatic bid to the NCAA tournament; no other Big Sky members were invited to the tournament or the NIT. Weber State was seeded fifteenth in the East regional and lost 71–53 to Xavier in the first round in St. Louis. It was the tenth consecutive year that the Big Sky representative lost in the first round.
