= Tyler Geving =

Current position
- Record: 112–133 (.457)

Biographical details
- Born: June 22, 1973 (age 53); Burien, Washington, U.S.

Playing career
- 1991–1995: Highline CC

Coaching career (HC unless noted)
- 1994–1996: Central Washington (asst.)
- 1996–2000: Highline CC (asst.)
- 2000–2001: Seattle Pacific (asst.)
- 2001–2004: Seattle (asst.)
- 2004–2005: Edmonds CC (co-HC)
- 2005–2009: Portland State (asst.)
- 2009–2017: Portland State
- 2018–2021: Portland (asst.)
- 2024-present: Edmonds Woodway High School

Head coaching record
- Overall: 112–133 (.457)

Tyler Geving (born June 22, 1973) is an American college basketball coach and a former head coach of Portland State University's Vikings men's basketball program. Before accepting the job as head coach, Geving served for four years as the assistant head coach of Portland State under Ken Bone. He was promoted to head coach following Bone's departure to Washington State in April 2009. Geving, currently, is the head boys basketball coach at Edmonds-Woodway High School, in Edmonds, Washington.

== Head coaching record ==
Record table
Season	Team	Overall	Conference	Standing	Postseason
Portland State (Big Sky Conference) (2009–2017)
2009–10	Portland State	13–19	7–9	6th	
2010–11	Portland State	14–16	5–11	7th	
2011–12	Portland State	17–15	10–6	3rd	
2012–13	Portland State	8–20	5–15	10th	
2013–14	Portland State	17–15	11–9	5th	CIT First Round
2014–15	Portland State	15–14	9–9	6th	
2015–16	Portland State	13–18	8–10	8th	
2016–17	Portland State	15–16	7–11	T–8th	
Portland State:		112–133 (.457)	62–80 (.437)		
Total:		112–133 (.457)			
National champion Postseason invitational champion Conference regular season champion Conference regular season and conference tournament champion Division regular season champion Division regular season and conference tournament champion Conference tournament champion
