= 2015–16 Sacramento State Hornets men's basketball team =

American college basketball season

2015–16 Sacramento State Hornets men's basketball
- Conference: Big Sky Conference
- Record: 14–17 (6–12 Big Sky)
- Head coach: Brian Katz (8th season)
- Assistant coaches: Brandon Laird; Ajay Riding; Chris Walker
- Home arena: Hornets Nest

2015–16 Big Sky men's basketball standings
	Conf.				Overall
Team	W		L	PCT	W		L	PCT
Weber State †	15	–	3	.833	26	–	9	.743
Montana	14	–	4	.778	21	–	12	.636
Idaho	12	–	6	.667	21	–	13	.618
Idaho State	11	–	7	.611	16	–	15	.516
Eastern Washington	10	–	8	.556	18	–	16	.529
North Dakota	10	–	8	.556	17	–	16	.515
Montana State	9	–	9	.500	14	–	17	.452
Portland State	8	–	10	.444	13	–	18	.419
Northern Colorado	7	–	11	.389	10	–	21	.323
Sacramento State	6	–	12	.333	14	–	17	.452
Northern Arizona	3	–	15	.167	5	–	25	.167
Southern Utah	3	–	15	.167	5	–	24	.172
† Conference tournament winner

The 2015–16 Sacramento State Hornets men's basketball team represented California State University, Sacramento during the 2015–16 NCAA Division I men's basketball season. The Hornets were led by eighth year head coach Brian Katz and played their home games at Colberg Court. They were members of the Big Sky Conference. They finished the season 14–17, 6–12 in Big Sky play to finish in tenth place. They defeated Montana State in the first round of the Big Sky tournament to advance to the quarterfinals where they lost to Montana.

== Previous season ==
The Hornets finished the season 21–12, 13–5 in Big Sky play to finish in a tie for third place. They advanced to the semifinals of the Big Sky tournament where they lost to Eastern Washington. They were invited to the CollegeInsider.com Tournament where they defeated Portland in the first round before losing in the second round to fellow Big Sky member Northern Arizona.

== Departures ==
Name	Number	Pos.	Height	Weight	Year	Hometown	Notes
Mikh McKinney	10	G	6'1"	170	Senior	Union City, California	Graduated
Zach Mills	20	F	6'5"	215	Senior	Yorba Linda, California	Graduated
Alex Tiffin	34	F	6'9"	235	Senior	Thousand Oaks, California	Graduated

== 2015 incoming recruits ==
College recruiting information
Name	Hometown	School	Height	Weight	Commit date
Joshua Patton; PF	Manteca, California	Sierra High School	6 ft 8 in (2.03 m)	200 lb (91 kg)	Sep 18, 2014
Joshua Patton; PF	Recruit ratings: Scout: Rivals: (NR)				
Jeff Wu; SG	Taipei, Taiwan	Modesto Christian High School	6 ft 2 in (1.88 m)	170 lb (77 kg)	Oct 24, 2014
Jeff Wu; SG	Recruit ratings: Scout: Rivals: (NR)				
Grant Dressler; SF	Las Vegas, Nevada	Palo Verde High School	6 ft 7 in (2.01 m)	200 lb (91 kg)	Apr 11, 2015
Grant Dressler; SF	Recruit ratings: Scout: Rivals: (NR)				
Overall recruit ranking:
Note: In many cases, Scout, Rivals, 247Sports, On3, and ESPN may conflict in their listings of height and weight.; In these cases, the average was taken. ESPN grades are on a 100-point scale.; Sources: "2015 Team Ranking". Rivals.

=== 2016 incoming recruits ===
College recruiting information (2016)
Name	Hometown	School	Height	Weight	Commit date
George Dancer; SG	Modesto, California	Beyer High School	6 ft 3 in (1.91 m)	N/A	Jul 8, 2015
George Dancer; SG	Recruit ratings: Scout: Rivals: (NR)				
Overall recruit ranking:
Note: In many cases, Scout, Rivals, 247Sports, On3, and ESPN may conflict in their listings of height and weight.; In these cases, the average was taken. ESPN grades are on a 100-point scale.; Sources: "2016 Team Ranking". Rivals.

== Roster ==
2015–16 Sacramento State Hornets men's basketball team
Players
Coaches

Pos.	#	Name	Height	Weight	Year	Previous school	Hometown
G	0	Marcus Graves	6 ft 0 in (1.83 m)	190 lb (86 kg)	So	Westview HS	San Diego, California
G	1	Dreon Barlett	6 ft 3 in (1.91 m)	190 lb (86 kg)	Sr	Edison HS	Huntington Beach, California
G	2	Cody Demps	6 ft 4 in (1.93 m)	195 lb (88 kg)	Sr	Pleasant Grove HS	Elk Grove, California
F	3	Justin Strings	6 ft 7 in (2.01 m)	225 lb (102 kg)	So	Mira Costa HS	Carson, California
G	4	Jiday Ugbaja	5 ft 11 in (1.8 m)	190 lb (86 kg)	So	Archbishop Riordan HS	San Francisco, California
G	11	Trevis Jackson (W)	5 ft 11 in (1.8 m)	165 lb (75 kg)	Jr	Santa Monica HS	Santa Monica, California
G/F	12	Grant Dressler	6 ft 6 in (1.98 m)	185 lb (84 kg)	Fr	Palo Verde HS	Las Vegas, Nevada
G	14	Jeff Wu	6 ft 2 in (1.88 m)	180 lb (82 kg)	Fr	Modesto Christian School	Taipei, Taiwan
F	21	Mason Stuteville	6 ft 11 in (2.11 m)	230 lb (104 kg)	So	Casa Roble HS	Orangevale, California
G	24	Aaron Harmetz (W)	5 ft 10 in (1.78 m)	175 lb (79 kg)	Fr	C. K. McClathchy HS	Sacramento, California
F	30	Joshua Patton (redshirt)	6 ft 8 in (2.03 m)	200 lb (91 kg)	Fr	Sierra HS	Manteca, California
G/F	33	Nick Hornsby	6 ft 7 in (2.01 m)	220 lb (100 kg)	Jr	Tustin HS	Irvine, California
C	44	Eric Stuteville	6 ft 11 in (2.11 m)	240 lb (109 kg)	Jr	Casa Roble HS	Orangevale, California
C	50	James Herrick	6 ft 10 in (2.08 m)	250 lb (113 kg)	So	Douglas HS	Minden, Nevada

Head coach

- Brian Katz (Sacramento State)

Assistant coach(es)

- Brandon Laird (UC Davis)
- Ajay Riding (Fresno State)
- Chris Walker (Oklahoma)

Legend

- (C) Team captain
- (S) Suspended
- (I) Ineligible
- (W) Walk-on
- Injured
- Current redshirt

Roster

== Schedule ==
Date time, TV	Opponent	Result	Record	Site (attendance) city, state
Exhibition
11/06/2015*; 7:05 pm	Simpson	W 103–63		Hornets Nest (525); Sacramento, California
Non-conference regular season
11/13/2015*; 4:30 pm, P12N	at Arizona State	W 66–63	1–0	Wells Fargo Arena (5,275); Tempe, Arizona
11/15/2015*; 2:05 pm	at Seattle	W 77–65	2–0	KeyArena (1,754); Seattle, Washington
11/20/2015*; 7:05 pm	Holy Names	W 96–56	3–0	Hornets Nest (625); Sacramento, California
11/24/2015*; 7:05 pm	UC Davis	W 84–79	4–0	Hornets Nest (1,472); Sacramento, California
11/28/2015*; 3:35 pm	South Dakota; Sacramento State Tournament	L 90–96	4–1	Hornets Nest (778); Sacramento, California
11/29/2015*; 5:35 pm	Pacific; Sacramento State Tournament	W 79–71	5–1	Hornets Nest (778); Sacramento, California
12/02/2015*; 7:05 pm	at UC Davis	L 61–66	5–2	The Pavilion (2,934); Davis, California
12/07/2015*; 7:05 pm	Incarnate Word	W 73–70	6–2	Hornets Nest (805); Sacramento, California
12/12/2015*; 7:05 pm	at Portland	L 73–81	6–3	Chiles Center (1,264); Portland, Oregon
12/21/2015*; 8:00 pm, P12N	at Stanford	L 60–70	6–4	Maples Pavilion (3,436); Stanford, California
12/28/2015*; 7:05 pm	Pacific Union	W 78–49	7–4	Hornets Nest (615); Sacramento, California
Big Sky regular season
01/02/2016; 7:05 pm	at Portland State	L 68–76	7–5 (0–1)	Peter Stott Center (485); Portland, Oregon
01/07/2016; 6:05 pm	at Montana State	L 64–71	7–6 (0–2)	Worthington Arena (2,036); Bozeman, Montana
01/09/2016; 6:05 pm	at Montana	L 58–77	7–7 (0–3)	Dahlberg Arena (3,846); Missoula, Montana
01/14/2016; 7:05 pm	Idaho State	W 82–71	8–7 (1–3)	Hornets Nest (781); Sacramento, California
01/16/2016; 7:05 pm	Weber State	L 74–85	8–8 (1–4)	Hornets Nest (898); Sacramento, California
01/23/2016; 7:05 pm	Portland State	L 63–81	8–9 (1–5)	Hornets Nest (1,058); Sacramento, California
01/28/2016; 7:05 pm	at Idaho	W 65–63	9–9 (2–5)	Cowan Spectrum (1,228); Moscow, Idaho
01/30/2016; 12:05 pm	at Eastern Washington	L 67–74	9–10 (2–6)	Reese Court (1,914); Cheney, Washington
02/04/2016; 7:05 pm	Montana	W 83–79	10–10 (3–6)	Hornets Nest (965); Sacramento, California
02/06/2016; 7:05 pm	Montana State	L 76–79	10–11 (3–7)	Hornets Nest (929); Sacramento, California
02/11/2016; 6:05 pm	at Weber State	W 63–50	10–12 (3–8)	Dee Events Center (6,504); Ogden, Utah
02/13/2016; 6:05 pm	at Idaho State	L 64–65	10–13 (3–9)	Holt Arena (1,941); Pocatello, Idaho
02/18/2016; 7:05 pm	Eastern Washington	L 88–93	10–14 (3–10)	Hornets Nest (649); Sacramento, California
02/20/2016; 7:05 pm	Idaho	W 68–65	11–14 (4–10)	Hornets Nest (845); Sacramento, California
02/25/2016; 6:05 pm	at Northern Colorado	L 67–72	11–15 (4–11)	Bank of Colorado Arena (1,295); Greeley, Colorado
02/27/2016; 12:05 pm	at North Dakota	L 71–97	11–16 (4–12)	Betty Engelstad Sioux Center (1,893); Grand Forks, North Dakota
03/03/2016; 7:05 pm	Southern Utah	W 69–63 ^{OT}	12–16 (5–12)	Hornets Nest (689); Sacramento, California
03/05/2016; 7:05 pm	Northern Arizona	W 64–51	13–16 (6–12)	Hornets Nest (793); Sacramento, California
Big Sky tournament
03/08/2016; 5:30 pm	vs. Montana State; First round	W 79–75	14–16	Reno Events Center (1,723); Reno, Nevada
03/10/2016; 5:30 pm	vs. Montana; Quarterfinals	L 53–70	14–17	Reno Events Center (2,213); Reno, Nevada
*Non-conference game. ^{#}Rankings from AP Poll. (#) Tournament seedings in parentheses. All times are in Pacific Time.
