= 2015–16 Idaho Vandals men's basketball team =

American college basketball season

2015–16 Idaho Vandals men's basketball

CBI, First round
- Conference: Big Sky Conference
- Record: 21–13 (12–6 Big Sky)
- Head coach: Don Verlin (8th season)
- Assistant coaches: Kirk Earlywine; Joe Ford; Tim Murphy
- Home arena: Cowan Spectrum, Memorial Gym

2015–16 Big Sky men's basketball standings
| | Conf. | | | | Overall |
| Team | W | | L | PCT | W | | L | PCT |
|---|---|---|---|---|---|---|---|---|
| Weber State † | 15 | – | 3 | .833 | 26 | – | 9 | .743 |
| Montana | 14 | – | 4 | .778 | 21 | – | 12 | .636 |
| Idaho | 12 | – | 6 | .667 | 21 | – | 13 | .618 |
| Idaho State | 11 | – | 7 | .611 | 16 | – | 15 | .516 |
| Eastern Washington | 10 | – | 8 | .556 | 18 | – | 16 | .529 |
| North Dakota | 10 | – | 8 | .556 | 17 | – | 16 | .515 |
| Montana State | 9 | – | 9 | .500 | 14 | – | 17 | .452 |
| Portland State | 8 | – | 10 | .444 | 13 | – | 18 | .419 |
| Northern Colorado | 7 | – | 11 | .389 | 10 | – | 21 | .323 |
| Sacramento State | 6 | – | 12 | .333 | 14 | – | 17 | .452 |
| Northern Arizona | 3 | – | 15 | .167 | 5 | – | 25 | .167 |
| Southern Utah | 3 | – | 15 | .167 | 5 | – | 24 | .172 |
† Conference tournament winner

The 2015–16 Idaho Vandals men's basketball team represented the University of Idaho during the 2015–16 NCAA Division I men's basketball season. The Vandals, led by eighth year head coach Don Verlin, played their home games at the Cowan Spectrum, with a few early season games at Memorial Gym, and were members of the Big Sky Conference. They finished the season 21–13, 12–6 record in Big Sky play to finish in third place. They defeated Eastern Washington in the quarterfinals of the Big Sky tournament to advance to the semifinals where they lost to Montana. They were invited to the College Basketball Invitational where they lost in the first round to Seattle.

== Previous season ==
The Vandals finished the 2014–15 season 13–17, 8–10 in Big Sky play to finish in a tie for seventh place. They lost in the quarterfinals of the Big Sky tournament to Eastern Washington.

== Departures ==
| Name | Number | Pos. | Height | Weight | Year | Hometown | Notes |
|---|---|---|---|---|---|---|---|
| Sekou Wiggs | 2 | G | 6'3" | 182 | Sophomore | Seattle, WA | Transferred to Alaska Anchorage |
| Connor Hill | 5 | G | 6'3" | 190 | Senior | Post Falls, ID | Graduated |
| Mike Scott | 12 | G | 6'0" | 180 | Senior | Los Angeles, CA | Graduated |
| Bira Sec | 13 | F | 6'6" | 215 | Senior | Dakar, Senegal | Graduated |
| Roberto Asencio | 50 | C | 6'9" | 245 | Junior | Haina, Dominican Republic | Left the team for personal reasons |

=== Incoming transfers ===
| Name | Number | Pos. | Height | Weight | Year | Hometown | Previous School |
|---|---|---|---|---|---|---|---|
| Chris Sarbaugh | 10 | G | 6'3" | 200 | Senior | Spokane, WA | Transferred from San Diego. Will be eligible to play immediately since Sarbaugh graduated from San Diego. |

== 2015 incoming recruits ==
College recruiting information
| Name | Hometown | School | Height | Weight | Commit date |
|---|---|---|---|---|---|
| Nick Blair; SF | Las Vegas, NV | Bishop Gorman High School | 6 ft 5 in (1.96 m) | 185 lb (84 kg) | Apr 1, 2015 |
| Nick Blair; SF | Recruit ratings: Scout: Rivals: (NR) | | | | |
Overall recruit ranking:
Note: In many cases, Scout, Rivals, 247Sports, On3, and ESPN may conflict in their listings of height and weight.; In these cases, the average was taken. ESPN grades are on a 100-point scale.; Sources: "2015 Team Ranking". Rivals.

== Roster ==
2015–16 Idaho Vandals men's basketball team
Players
Coaches

| Pos. | # | Name | Height | Weight | Year | Previous school | Hometown |
|---|---|---|---|---|---|---|---|
| F | 0 | Nick Blair | 6 ft 5 in (1.96 m) | 201 lb (91 kg) | Fr | Bishop Gorman HS | Las Vegas, NV |
| G | 1 | Perrion Callandret | 6 ft 2 in (1.88 m) | 180 lb (82 kg) | Jr | Bothell HS | Bothell, WA |
| G | 2 | Myles Franklin | 6 ft 0 in (1.83 m) | 171 lb (78 kg) | Fr | Hart HS | Castaic, CA |
| G | 3 | Tyler Brimhall | 6 ft 4 in (1.93 m) | 185 lb (84 kg) | Fr | Logan HS | Logan, UT |
| G | 5 | Jake Straughan | 6 ft 1 in (1.85 m) | 175 lb (79 kg) | RS Fr | Colton HS | Colton, WA |
| G | 10 | Chris Sarbaugh | 6 ft 4 in (1.93 m) | 201 lb (91 kg) | Sr | Gonzaga Prep; San Diego | Spokane, WA |
| G | 11 | Victor Sanders | 6 ft 5 in (1.96 m) | 195 lb (88 kg) | So | Jefferson HS | Portland, OR |
| G | 13 | Pat Ingram | 6 ft 2 in (1.88 m) | 218 lb (99 kg) | Jr | North Central HS; Trinity Valley CC | Indianapolis, IN |
| G | 14 | Chad Sherwood (W) | 6 ft 2 in (1.88 m) | 180 lb (82 kg) | So | West Albany HS | Albany, OR |
| F | 15 | Paulin Mpawe | 6 ft 10 in (2.08 m) | 227 lb (103 kg) | Sr | Redlands East Valley HS; San Bernardino Valley College | San Bernardino, CA |
| F | 21 | Arkadiy Mkrtuchyan | 6 ft 7 in (2.01 m) | 227 lb (103 kg) | So | Columbia Christian HS | Portland, OR |
| F | 23 | Nate Sherwood | 6 ft 8 in (2.03 m) | 206 lb (93 kg) | RS Fr | West Albany HS | Albany, OR |
| F | 24 | George Nahshon | 6 ft 9 in (2.06 m) | 200 lb (91 kg) | Sr | Radford HS; Shoreline CC | Kapolei, HI |
| G | 33 | Skyler White | 6 ft 6 in (1.98 m) | 238 lb (108 kg) | RS So | Northfield Mount Hermon School; George Washington | Bellevue, WA |
| F | 41 | Ty Egbert | 6 ft 9 in (2.06 m) | 195 lb (88 kg) | Jr | Lake Roosevelt HS | Coulee Dam, WA |
| F | 44 | Jordan Scott | 6 ft 6 in (1.98 m) | 200 lb (91 kg) | So | Lewis-Palmer HS | Colorado Springs, CO |

Head coach

- Don Verlin (Colorado State)

Assistant coach(es)

- Kirk Earlywine (Campbell)
- Joe Ford (Pacific)
- Tim Murphy (Colorado State)

Legend

- (C) Team captain
- (S) Suspended
- (I) Ineligible
- (W) Walk-on
- Injured
- Current redshirt

Roster

== Schedule ==
| Date time, TV | Rank^{#} | Opponent^{#} | Result | Record | Site (attendance) city, state |
Exhibition
| 10/30/2015*; 6:00 pm | | Saint Martin's | W 86–62 | | Memorial Gym; Moscow, ID |
| 11/06/2015*; 7:00 pm | | Lewis–Clark State | W 88–53 | | Memorial Gym; Moscow, ID |
Non-conference regular season
| 11/14/2015*; 7:00 pm | | at San Jose State | W 74–54 | 1–0 | Event Center Arena (1,327); San Jose, CA |
| 11/17/2015*; 7:00 pm | | at Cal State Bakersfield | L 45–68 | 1–1 | Icardo Center (1,480); Bakersfield, CA |
| 11/21/2015*; 7:00 pm | | Linfield; Mean Green Showcase | W 85–59 | 2–1 | Memorial Gym (609); Moscow, ID |
| 11/23/2015*; 5:30 pm | | at North Texas; Mean Green Showcase | W 65–63 | 3–1 | The Super Pit (1,756); Denton, TX |
| 11/24/2015*; 3:00 pm | | vs. Troy; Mean Green Showcase | W 69–63 | 4–1 | The Super Pit (256); Denton, TX |
| 11/24/2015*; 12:00 pm | | vs. Samford; Mean Green Showcase | L 58–75 | 4–2 | The Super Pit (177); Denton, TX |
| 11/28/2015*; 7:00 pm | | Northern Illinois | L 59–66 | 4–3 | Memorial Gym (571); Moscow, ID |
| 12/02/2015*; 8:00 pm | | Cal State Bakersfield | W 67–63 | 5–3 | Memorial Gym (563); Moscow, ID |
| 12/05/2015*; 5:00 pm | | Arkansas–Little Rock | L 54–64 | 5–4 | Cowan Spectrum (1,154); Moscow, ID |
| 12/07/2015*; 7:00 pm, P12N | | at USC | L 55–74 | 5–5 | Galen Center (2,865); Los Angeles, CA |
| 12/10/2015*; 6:00 pm | | Washington State; Battle of the Palouse | W 78–74 | 6–5 | Cowan Spectrum (3,759); Moscow, ID |
| 12/18/2015*; 7:00 pm | | New Hope | W 127–54 | 7–5 | Cowan Spectrum; Moscow, ID |
| 12/22/2015*; 7:00 pm | | at UC Davis | W 68–51 | 8–5 | The Pavilion (1,211); Davis, CA |
Big Sky regular season
| 12/31/2015; 4:00 pm | | at North Dakota | W 74–71 | 9–5 (1–0) | Betty Engelstad Sioux Center (1,436); Grand Forks, ND |
| 01/02/2016; 1:00 pm | | at Northern Colorado | W 75–70 | 10–5 (2–0) | Bank of Colorado Arena (1,145); Greeley, CO |
| 01/09/2016; 12:05 pm | | at Eastern Washington | L 60–74 | 10–6 (2–1) | Reese Court (3,262); Cheney, WA |
| 01/14/2016; 7:00 pm | | Northern Arizona | W 83–76 | 11–6 (3–1) | Cowan Spectrum (1,318); Moscow, ID |
| 01/16/2016; 7:00 pm | | Southern Utah | L 83–85 ^{OT} | 11–7 (3–2) | Cowan Spectrum (1,456); Moscow, ID |
| 01/21/2016; 6:05 pm | | at Montana | W 63–58 | 12–7 (4–2) | Dahlberg Arena (3,733); Missoula, MT |
| 01/23/2016; 1:05 pm | | at Montana State | L 68–70 | 12–8 (4–3) | Worthington Arena (2,435); Bozeman, MT |
| 01/28/2016; 7:00 pm | | Sacramento State | L 63–65 | 12–9 (4–4) | Cowan Spectrum (1,228); Moscow, ID |
| 01/30/2016; 7:00 pm | | Portland State | W 56–55 | 13–9 (5–4) | Cowan Spectrum (1,546); Moscow, ID |
| 02/04/2016; 6:00 pm | | at Southern Utah | W 68–44 | 14–9 (6–4) | Centrum Arena (1,213); Cedar City, UT |
| 02/06/2016; 1:00 pm | | at Northern Arizona | L 70–72 | 14–10 (6–5) | Walkup Skydome (1,623); Flagstaff, AZ |
| 02/11/2016; 7:00 pm | | Northern Colorado | W 73–67 | 15–10 (7–5) | Cowan Spectrum (1,012); Moscow, ID |
| 02/13/2016; 7:00 pm | | North Dakota | W 65–64 | 16–10 (8–5) | Cowan Spectrum (1,537); Moscow, ID |
| 02/18/2016; 7:05 pm | | at Portland State | W 80–74 | 17–10 (9–5) | Peter Stott Center (920); Portland, OR |
| 02/20/2016; 7:05 pm | | at Sacramento State | L 65–68 | 17–11 (9–6) | Colberg Court (845); Sacramento, CA |
| 02/27/2016; 1:00 pm | | Eastern Washington | W 66–62 | 18–11 (10–6) | Memorial Gym (1,500); Moscow, ID |
| 03/03/2016; 7:00 pm | | Weber State | W 62–58 | 19–11 (11–6) | Cowan Spectrum (1,476); Moscow, ID |
| 03/05/2016; 7:00 pm | | Idaho State | W 82–68 | 20–11 (12–6) | Cowan Spectrum (2,549); Moscow, ID |
Big Sky tournament
| 03/10/2016; 8:00 pm | (3) | vs. (6) Eastern Washington; Quarterfinals | W 77–73 | 21–11 | Reno Events Center (2,365); Reno, NV |
| 03/11/2016; 8:00 pm | (3) | vs. (2) Montana; Semifinals | L 72–81 | 21–12 | Reno Events Center (2,362); Reno, NV |
CBI
| 03/16/2016*; 7:00 pm | | at Seattle; First round | L 63–68 | 21–13 | Connolly Center (999); Seattle, WA |
*Non-conference game. ^{#}Rankings from AP Poll. (#) Tournament seedings in parentheses. All times are in Pacific Time.
