= 2015–16 Northern Arizona Lumberjacks men's basketball team =

American college basketball season

2015–16 Northern Arizona Lumberjacks men's basketball
- Conference: Big Sky Conference
- Record: 5–25 (3–15 Big Sky)
- Head coach: Jack Murphy (4th season)
- Assistant coaches: Matt Dunn; Wes Pifer; Kevin Kruger
- Home arena: Walkup Skydome; Rolle Activity Center

2015–16 Big Sky men's basketball standings
	Conf.				Overall
Team	W		L	PCT	W		L	PCT
Weber State †	15	–	3	.833	26	–	9	.743
Montana	14	–	4	.778	21	–	12	.636
Idaho	12	–	6	.667	21	–	13	.618
Idaho State	11	–	7	.611	16	–	15	.516
Eastern Washington	10	–	8	.556	18	–	16	.529
North Dakota	10	–	8	.556	17	–	16	.515
Montana State	9	–	9	.500	14	–	17	.452
Portland State	8	–	10	.444	13	–	18	.419
Northern Colorado	7	–	11	.389	10	–	21	.323
Sacramento State	6	–	12	.333	14	–	17	.452
Northern Arizona	3	–	15	.167	5	–	25	.167
Southern Utah	3	–	15	.167	5	–	24	.172
† Conference tournament winner

The 2015–16 Northern Arizona Lumberjacks men's basketball team represented Northern Arizona University during the 2015–16 NCAA Division I men's basketball season. The Lumberjacks were led by fourth year head coach Jack Murphy and played their home games at the Walkup Skydome, with one home game at the Rolle Activity Center. They were members of the Big Sky Conference. They finished the season 5–25, 3–14 in Big Sky play to finish in a tie for 11th place. They lost in the first round of the Big Sky tournament to Eastern Washington.

== Previous season ==
They finished the season 23–15, 13–5 in Big Sky play to finish in a tie for third place. They advanced to the semifinals of the Big Sky tournament where they lost to Montana. They were invited to the CollegeInsider.com Tournament where they defeated Grand Canyon, Sacramento State, Kent State, and NJIT to advance to the CIT championship game where they lost to Evansville.

== Departures ==
Name	Number	Pos.	Height	Weight	Year	Hometown	Notes
Geoffrey Frid	0	C	7'1"	233	Sophomore	Carlsbad, California	Transferred to Cal State Los Angeles
Aaseem Dixon	1	G	6'0"	185	Senior	Las Vegas, Nevada	Graduated
Quinton Upshur	2	G	6'5"	207	Senior	Norfolk, Virginia	Graduated
Tate de Laveaga	3	G	6'3"	192	Freshman	Scottsdale, Arizona	Transferred to Eastern Oregon
Zach Reynolds	14	F	6'9"	240	Senior	Tampa, Florida	Graduated
Len Springs	15	F/C	6'10"	220	RS Senior	Compton, California	Graduated
Jaran Hoover	21	G	6'3"	175	RS Freshman	Prescott, Arizona	Walk-on; didn't return
Chris Miller	22	G	6'3"	175	RS Sophomore	Peoria, Arizona	Transferred
Gaellan Bewernick	32	F	6'6"	215	Senor	Los Angeles, California	Graduated

== 2015 incoming recruits ==
College recruiting information
Name	Hometown	School	Height	Weight	Commit date
Michael Green #62 PG	Fort Lauderdale, Florida	Dillard High School	5 ft 11 in (1.80 m)	160 lb (73 kg)	
Michael Green #62 PG	Recruit ratings: Scout: Rivals: (75)				
Brady Twombly #83 SF	Carlsbad, California	La Costa Canyon High School	6 ft 5 in (1.96 m)	200 lb (91 kg)	Nov 2, 2014
Brady Twombly #83 SF	Recruit ratings: Scout: Rivals: (67)				
Majestic Tejada; PG	Hollywood, Florida	McArthur High School	6 ft 1 in (1.85 m)	N/A	Apr 12, 2014
Majestic Tejada; PG	Recruit ratings: Scout: Rivals: (NR)				
Corey Brown; PF	Lauderhill, Florida	McArthur High School	6 ft 8 in (2.03 m)	N/A	Aug 29, 2014
Corey Brown; PF	Recruit ratings: Scout: Rivals: (NR)				
Bryant Searcy; SG	Tampa, Florida	Tampa Bay Christian Academy	6 ft 4 in (1.93 m)	N/A	
Bryant Searcy; SG	Recruit ratings: Scout: Rivals: (NR)				
Isaiah Thomas; C	Oakland, California	Bishop O'Dowd High School	6 ft 8 in (2.03 m)	225 lb (102 kg)	Feb 17, 2015
Isaiah Thomas; C	Recruit ratings: Scout: Rivals: (NR)				
Overall recruit ranking:
Note: In many cases, Scout, Rivals, 247Sports, On3, and ESPN may conflict in their listings of height and weight.; In these cases, the average was taken. ESPN grades are on a 100-point scale.; Sources: "2015 Team Ranking". Rivals.

=== 2016 incoming recruits ===
College recruiting information (2016)
Name	Hometown	School	Height	Weight	Commit date
Ray Robinson; C	Coconut Creek, Florida	Deerfield Beach High School	6 ft 8 in (2.03 m)	185 lb (84 kg)	Jun 28, 2015
Ray Robinson; C	Recruit ratings: Scout: Rivals: (NR)				
Overall recruit ranking:
Note: In many cases, Scout, Rivals, 247Sports, On3, and ESPN may conflict in their listings of height and weight.; In these cases, the average was taken. ESPN grades are on a 100-point scale.; Sources: "2016 Team Ranking". Rivals.

== Roster ==
2015–16 Northern Arizona Lumberjacks men's basketball team
Players
Coaches

Pos.	#	Name	Height	Weight	Year	Previous school	Hometown
G	0	Torry Johnson	6 ft 3 in (1.91 m)	165 lb (75 kg)	RS Fr	Morgan Park HS	Chicago, Illinois
G	1	Majestic Tejada	6 ft 0 in (1.83 m)	170 lb (77 kg)	Fr	McArthur HS	Hollywood, Florida
F	2	Corey Brown	6 ft 8 in (2.03 m)	230 lb (104 kg)	Fr	McArthur HS	Hollywood, Florida
G	4	Kris Yanku	6 ft 4 in (1.93 m)	183 lb (83 kg)	Jr	WH Taft HS	Woodland Hills, California
G	5	Mike Green	5 ft 10 in (1.78 m)	150 lb (68 kg)	Fr	Dillard HS	Fort Lauderdale, Florida
G	10	Jaleni Neely	6 ft 0 in (1.83 m)	165 lb (75 kg)	Sr	Simeon Academy/Eastern Utah	Chicago, Illinois
F/C	11	Ako Kaluna	6 ft 7 in (2.01 m)	276 lb (125 kg)	Jr	West Ranch HS	Valencia, California
G	12	Kye de Laveaga (W)	6 ft 1 in (1.85 m)	178 lb (81 kg)	So	Westwind Prep	Scottsdale, Arizona
F	13	Felix Rivera-Vega	6 ft 6 in (1.98 m)	225 lb (102 kg)	Fr	McArthur HS	Hollywood, Florida
F	14	Brady Twombly	6 ft 5 in (1.96 m)	225 lb (102 kg)	Fr	La Costa Canyon HS	Carlsbad, California
G	15	Bryant Searcy, Jr.	6 ft 4 in (1.93 m)	190 lb (86 kg)	Fr	Brooks De Bartolo Collegiate HS	Tampa, Florida
F	20	Steven Stanley (W)	6 ft 6 in (1.98 m)	215 lb (98 kg)	Fr	XXXX	Phoenix, Arizona
G	23	Austin Lee (W)	5 ft 10 in (1.78 m)	180 lb (82 kg)	So	Brentwood School	Los Angeles, California
F	24	Alessandro Stecca	6 ft 6 in (1.98 m)	195 lb (88 kg)	RS Jr	Mater Dei HS	Corona del Mar, California
F	33	Isaiah Thomas	6 ft 9 in (2.06 m)	230 lb (104 kg)	Fr	Bishop O'Dowd HS	Oakland, California
F	34	Jordyn Martin	6 ft 7 in (2.01 m)	210 lb (95 kg)	Sr	Palo Verde HS	Las Vegas, Nevada
G	41	Marcus DeBerry	6 ft 5 in (1.96 m)	150 lb (68 kg)	Fr	Union City HS	Union City, Tennessee

Head coach

- Jack Murphy (Arizona)

Assistant coach(es)

- Matt Dunn (Fort Hays State)
- Wes Pifer (Penn State Altoona)
- Kevin Kruger (Arizona State)

Legend

- (C) Team captain
- (S) Suspended
- (I) Ineligible
- (W) Walk-on
- Injured
- Current redshirt

Roster

== Schedule ==
Date time, TV	Opponent	Result	Record	Site (attendance) city, state
Exhibition
11/06/2015*; 6:30 pm	California Baptist	L 70–89		Rolle Activity Center (658); Flagstaff, Arizona
Non-conference regular season
11/13/2015*; 6:30 pm, P12N	at Washington State	L 70–82	0–1	Beasley Coliseum (3,011); Pullman, Washington
11/16/2015*; 7:00 pm, RTRM	at Boise State	L 81–101	0–2	Taco Bell Arena (4,489); Boise, Idaho
11/18/2015*; 7:00 pm, RTRM	at No. 10 Gonzaga	L 52–91	0–3	McCarthey Athletic Center (6,000); Spokane, Washington
11/20/2015*; 7:00 pm	Embry–Riddle	W 90–57	1–3	Bee Holdzil Fighting Scouts Events Center (2,369); Fort Defiance, Arizona
11/23/2015*; 6:30 pm, FSAZ+	San Diego Christian	W 81–65	2–3	Rolle Activity Center (602); Flagstaff, Arizona
11/30/2015*; 6:30 pm	Norfolk State	L 66–70	2–4	Walkup Skydome (967); Flagstaff, Arizona
12/02/2015*; 7:00 pm, FSAZ+/FCSP	Hampton	L 94–98 ^{2OT}	2–5	Walkup Skydome (986); Flagstaff, Arizona
12/05/2015*; 8:00 pm	at Cal State Bakersfield	L 55–72	2–6	Icardo Center (1,001); Bakersfield, California
12/16/2015*; 8:00 pm, P12N	at No. 13 Arizona	L 37–92	2–7	McKale Center (13,566); Tucson, Arizona
12/20/2015*; 12:00 pm	at Arkansas–Little Rock	L 57–84	2–8	Jack Stephens Center (3,130); Little Rock, Arkansas
12/22/2015*; 6:00 pm, ESPN3	at Tulsa	L 55–90	2–9	Reynolds Center (4,752); Tulsa, Oklahoma
Big Sky regular season
12/31/2015; 12:00 pm, FSAZ+	Montana	L 84–90 ^{2OT}	2–10 (0–1)	Walkup Skydome (907); Flagstaff, Arizona
01/02/2016; 12:00 pm	Montana State	L 72–74 ^{OT}	2–11 (0–2)	Walkup Skydome (1,007); Flagstaff, Arizona
01/09/2016; 7:00 pm	at Southern Utah	W 73–63	3–11 (1–2)	Centrum Arena (3,011); Cedar City, Utah
01/14/2016; 8:00 pm	at Idaho	L 76–83	3–12 (1–3)	Cowan Spectrum (1,318); Moscow, Idaho
01/16/2016; 1:05 pm	at Eastern Washington	L 73–96	3–13 (1–4)	Reese Court (1,455); Cheney, Washington
01/21/2016; 6:30 pm, FSAZ+	North Dakota	L 59–101	3–14 (1–5)	Walkup Skydome; Flagstaff, Arizona
01/23/2016; 2:00 pm, FSAZ+	Northern Colorado	L 79–84	3–15 (1–6)	Walkup Skydome (1,529); Flagstaff, Arizona
01/28/2016; 7:00 pm	at Weber State	L 66–76	3–16 (1–7)	Dee Events Center (6,381); Ogden, Utah
01/30/2016; 7:00 pm	at Idaho State	L 66–88	3–17 (1–8)	Holt Arena (1,813); Pocatello, Idaho
02/04/2016; 6:35 pm, FSAZ+	Eastern Washington	L 73–84	3–18 (1–9)	Walkup Skydome (1,168); Flagstaff, Arizona
02/06/2016; 2:00 pm, FSAZ+	Idaho	W 72–70	4–18 (2–9)	Walkup Skydome (1,623); Flagstaff, Arizona
02/11/2016; 7:00 pm	at Montana State	L 58–101	4–19 (2–10)	Worthington Arena (2,275); Bozeman, Montana
02/13/2016; 7:00 pm	at Montana	L 67–85	4–20 (2–11)	Dahlberg Arena (4,339); Missoula, Montana
02/18/2016; 6:30 pm, FSAZ+	Idaho State	W 81–68	5–20 (3–11)	Walkup Skydome (1,011); Flagstaff, Arizona
02/20/2016; 4:00 pm, FSAZ+	Weber State	L 74–77	5–21 (3–12)	Walkup Skydome (1,343); Flagstaff, Arizona
02/27/2016; 2:00 pm, FSAZ+	Southern Utah	L 59–69	5–22 (3–13)	Walkup Skydome (1,365); Flagstaff, Arizona
03/03/2016; 8:00 pm	at Portland State	L 81–89	5–23 (3–14)	Peter Stott Center (705); Portland, Oregon
03/05/2016; 8:05 pm	at Sacramento State	L 51–64	5–24 (3–15)	Colberg Court (793); Sacramento, California
Big Sky tournament
03/08/2016; 9:00 pm	vs. Eastern Washington; First round	L 52–74	5–25	Reno Events Center (1,723); Reno, Nevada
*Non-conference game. ^{#}Rankings from AP Poll. (#) Tournament seedings in parentheses. All times are in Mountain Time.
