= 2015–16 Portland State Vikings men's basketball team =

American college basketball season

2015–16 Portland State Vikings men's basketball
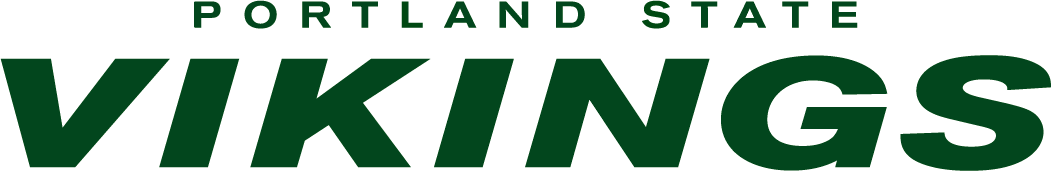
- Conference: Big Sky Conference
- Record: 13–18 (8–10 Big Sky)
- Head coach: Tyler Geving (7th season)
- Assistant coaches: Jeff Hironaka; Jase Coburn; Michael Plank
- Home arena: Peter Stott Center

2015–16 Big Sky men's basketball standings
| | Conf. | | | | Overall |
| Team | W | | L | PCT | W | | L | PCT |
|---|---|---|---|---|---|---|---|---|
| Weber State † | 15 | – | 3 | .833 | 26 | – | 9 | .743 |
| Montana | 14 | – | 4 | .778 | 21 | – | 12 | .636 |
| Idaho | 12 | – | 6 | .667 | 21 | – | 13 | .618 |
| Idaho State | 11 | – | 7 | .611 | 16 | – | 15 | .516 |
| Eastern Washington | 10 | – | 8 | .556 | 18 | – | 16 | .529 |
| North Dakota | 10 | – | 8 | .556 | 17 | – | 16 | .515 |
| Montana State | 9 | – | 9 | .500 | 14 | – | 17 | .452 |
| Portland State | 8 | – | 10 | .444 | 13 | – | 18 | .419 |
| Northern Colorado | 7 | – | 11 | .389 | 10 | – | 21 | .323 |
| Sacramento State | 6 | – | 12 | .333 | 14 | – | 17 | .452 |
| Northern Arizona | 3 | – | 15 | .167 | 5 | – | 25 | .167 |
| Southern Utah | 3 | – | 15 | .167 | 5 | – | 24 | .172 |
† Conference tournament winner

The 2015–16 Portland State Vikings men's basketball team represented Portland State University during the 2015–16 NCAA Division I men's basketball season. The Vikings, led by seventh year head coach Tyler Geving, played their home games at the Peter Stott Center and were members of the Big Sky Conference. They finished the season 13–18, 8–10 in Big Sky play to finish in eighth place. They defeated Northern Colorado in the first round of the Big Sky tournament to advance to the quarterfinals where they lost to Weber State.

== Previous season ==
The Vikings finished the season 15–14, 9–9 in Big Sky play to finish in sixth place. They lost in the quarterfinals of the Big Sky tournament to Sacramento State.

== Departures ==
| Name | Number | Pos. | Height | Weight | Year | Hometown | Notes |
|---|---|---|---|---|---|---|---|
| Gary Winston | 0 | G | 6'0" | 190 | Senior | Walla Walla, Washington | Graduated |
| Iziahiah Sweeney | 10 | G | 6'3" | 170 | Freshman | Compton, California | Transferred to Panola College |
| Tim Douglas | 11 | G | 5'10" | 160 | RS Senior | Cerritos, California | Graduated |
| Kyler Shula | 12 | G | 5'10" | 170 | Junior | Puyallup, Washington | Graduated |
| Tiegbe Bamba | 13 | F | 6'10" | 205 | Senior | Sarcelles, France | Graduated |
| Dorian Cason | 21 | C | 6'7" | 250 | Junior | Fontana, California | Transferred |
| DaShaun Wiggins | 23 | G | 6'2" | 190 | Senior | Bronx, New York | Graduated |
| Sebastian Suarez | 30 | G | 6'4" | 210 | Senior | Ancud, Chile | Graduated |
| Joel King | 34 | G | 6'3" | 185 | Senior | Lacey, Washington | Graduated |
| Brandon Cataldo | 44 | C | 6'10" | 285 | Senior | Rainier, Oregon | Graduated |

=== Incoming transfers ===
| Name | Number | Pos. | Height | Weight | Year | Hometown | Previous School |
|---|---|---|---|---|---|---|---|
| Isaiah Pineiro | 0 | F | 6'6" | 185 | Sophomore | Auburn, California | Junior college transferred from Sierra College |
| Cameron Forte | 5 | F | 6'7" | 220 | Senior | Tempe, Arizona | Transferred from Georgia. Forte will be eligible to play immediately since Forte graduated from Georgia. |
| DeSean Parsons | 13 | G | 6'7" | 190 | Junior | Sacramento, California | Junior college transferred from Salt Lake Community College |
| Evan Garrison | 14 | G | 5'10" | | Junior | Tigard, Oregon | Junior college transferred from Clark College. |
| Donivine Stewart | 20 | G | 6'0" | 195 | RS Senior | Peoria, Illinois | Transferred from SIU Edwardsville. Stewart will be eligible to play immediately since Stewart graduated from SIU Edwardsville. |
| Namdi Okonkwo | 21 | C | 7'0" | 202 | Junior | Dallas, Texas | Junior college transferred Western Wyoming Community College |
| Khari Holloway | 23 | G | 6'2" | | Junior | Jackson, Mississippi | Junior college transferred from Mesa Community College |

== 2015 incoming recruits ==
College recruiting information
| Name | Hometown | School | Height | Weight | Commit date |
|---|---|---|---|---|---|
| Armani Collins; SG | San Francisco | Stuart Hall High School | 6 ft 3 in (1.91 m) | 165 lb (75 kg) | Jun 15, 2015 |
| Armani Collins; SG | Recruit ratings: Scout: Rivals: (NR) | | | | |
Overall recruit ranking:
Note: In many cases, Scout, Rivals, 247Sports, On3, and ESPN may conflict in their listings of height and weight.; In these cases, the average was taken. ESPN grades are on a 100-point scale.; Sources: "2015 Team Ranking". Rivals.

=== 2016 incoming recruits ===
College recruiting information (2016)
| Name | Hometown | School | Height | Weight | Commit date |
|---|---|---|---|---|---|
| Tyrell Henderson #78 SG | Chandler, Arizona | Corona Del Sol High School | 6 ft 3 in (1.91 m) | 165 lb (75 kg) | Aug 15, 2015 |
| Tyrell Henderson #78 SG | Recruit ratings: Scout: Rivals: (NR) | | | | |
| Brendan Rumel; C | Tucson, Arizona | Rincon High School | 6 ft 11 in (2.11 m) | N/A | Aug 18, 2015 |
| Brendan Rumel; C | Recruit ratings: Scout: Rivals: (NR) | | | | |
Overall recruit ranking:
Note: In many cases, Scout, Rivals, 247Sports, On3, and ESPN may conflict in their listings of height and weight.; In these cases, the average was taken. ESPN grades are on a 100-point scale.; Sources: "2016 Team Ranking". Rivals.

== Roster ==
2015–16 Portland State Vikings men's basketball team
Players
Coaches

| Pos. | # | Name | Height | Weight | Year | Previous school | Hometown |
|---|---|---|---|---|---|---|---|
| F | 0 | Isaiah Pineiro | 6 ft 6 in (1.98 m) | 210 lb (95 kg) | So | Placer; Sierra College | Auburn, California |
| G | 1 | Zach Gengler | 6 ft 2 in (1.88 m) | 180 lb (82 kg) | Jr | Silverton | Silverton, Oregon |
| C | 2 | Collin Spickerman | 6 ft 8 in (2.03 m) | 230 lb (104 kg) | Sr | Jesuit; Clark College | Portland, Oregon |
| G | 3 | Armani Collins | 6 ft 5 in (1.96 m) | 190 lb (86 kg) | Fr | Stuart Hall | San Francisco, California |
| F | 5 | Cameron Forte | 6 ft 7 in (2.01 m) | 220 lb (100 kg) | RS Sr | McClintock; Georgia | Tempe, Arizona |
| G | 10 | Daniel Davydov (W) | 6 ft 0 in (1.83 m) | 175 lb (79 kg) | Fr | Seattle Academy | Bellevue, Washington |
| G | 11 | Calaen Robinson | 6 ft 2 in (1.88 m) | 180 lb (82 kg) | RS Jr | Corona del Sol; Arizona State | Tempe, Arizona |
| G | 12 | Bryce White | 6 ft 5 in (1.96 m) | 200 lb (91 kg) | Jr | Benson Tech; Chemeketa CC | Portland, Oregon |
| G/F | 13 | De'Sean Parsons | 6 ft 7 in (2.01 m) | 195 lb (88 kg) | Jr | Grant Union; Salt Lake CC | Sacramento, California |
| G | 14 | Evan Garrison | 5 ft 10 in (1.78 m) | 170 lb (77 kg) | Jr | Tigard; Clark College | Tigard, Oregon |
| F | 15 | Braxton Tucker | 6 ft 6 in (1.98 m) | 220 lb (100 kg) | Jr | Spanaway Lake; North Idaho College | Tacoma, Washington |
| G | 20 | Donivine Stewart | 6 ft 0 in (1.83 m) | 195 lb (88 kg) | RS Sr | Limestone; SIU Edwardsville | Peoria, Illinois |
| C | 21 | Namdi Okonkwo | 7 ft 0 in (2.13 m) | 205 lb (93 kg) | Jr | Westwind Prep; Western Wyoming CC | Dallas, Texas |
| G | 23 | Khari Holloway | 6 ft 2 in (1.88 m) | 185 lb (84 kg) | Jr | Mountain Pointe; Mesa CC | Jackson, Mississippi |
| F | 30 | Austin Bryant (W) | 6 ft 6 in (1.98 m) | 190 lb (86 kg) | Fr | Murrieta Valley | Murrieta, California |
| F | 34 | Montie Leunen (W) | 6 ft 4 in (1.93 m) | 190 lb (86 kg) | Jr | Westview; Shasta College | Portland, Oregon |

Head coach

- Tyler Geving (Central Washington)

Assistant coach(es)

- Jeff Hironaka (Eastern Oregon)
- Jase Coburn (Arizona State)
- Michael Plank (Willamette)

Legend

- (C) Team captain
- (S) Suspended
- (I) Ineligible
- (W) Walk-on
- Injured
- Current redshirt

Roster

== Schedule ==
| Date time, TV | Rank^{#} | Opponent^{#} | Result | Record | Site (attendance) city, state |
Exhibition
| 11/06/2015*; 7:05 pm | | Lewis & Clark | W 101–85 | | Peter Stott Center (403); Portland, Oregon |
Non-conference regular season
| 11/13/2015*; 6:00 pm | | at Grand Canyon | L 72–82 | 0–1 | GCU Arena (7,249); Phoenix, Arizona |
| 11/13/2015*; 7:05 pm | | Pacific Lutheran | W 105–60 | 1–1 | Peter Stott Center (536); Portland, Oregon |
| 11/22/2015*; 12:00 pm | | at Texas–Rio Grande Valley | W 79–61 | 2–1 | UTRGV Fieldhouse (523); Edinburg, Texas |
| 11/25/2015*; 7:00 pm | | at Nevada | L 73–76 | 2–2 | Lawlor Events Center (5,890); Reno, Nevada |
| 11/28/2015*; 7:05 pm | | Multnomah | W 100–82 | 3–2 | Peter Stott Center (512); Portland, Oregon |
| 12/02/2015*; 7:05 pm | | Portland | L 72–78 | 3–3 | Peter Stott Center (785); Portland, Oregon |
| 12/05/2015*; 1:00 pm, P12N | | at Washington State | L 67–91 | 3–4 | Beasley Coliseum (1,806); Pullman, Washington |
| 12/12/2015*; 5:00 pm | | at SIU Edwardsville | L 64–74 | 3–5 | Vadalabene Center (1,268); Edwardsville, Illinois |
| 12/17/2015*; 7:05 pm | | Cal State Northridge | L 71–77 | 3–6 | Peter Stott Center (412); Portland, Oregon |
| 12/22/2015*; 7:00 pm | | at Cal State Bakersfield | L 66–78 | 3–7 | Icardo Center (1,006); Bakersfield, California |
| 12/29/2015*; 7:05 pm | | Cal State Fullerton | W 89–82 | 4–7 | Peter Stott Center (426); Portland, Oregon |
Big Sky regular season
| 01/02/2016; 7:05 pm | | Sacramento State | W 76–68 | 5–7 (1–0) | Peter Stott Center (485); Portland, Oregon |
| 01/07/2016; 1:05 pm | | at Montana | L 66–79 | 5–8 (1–1) | Dahlberg Arena (3,451); Missoula, Montana |
| 01/09/2016; 6:00 pm | | at Montana State | W 77–70 | 6–8 (2–1) | Worthington Arena (2,233); Bozeman, Montana |
| 01/14/2016; 7:05 pm | | Weber State | L 58–73 | 6–9 (2–2) | Peter Stott Center (838); Portland, Oregon |
| 01/16/2016; 7:05 pm | | Idaho State | L 70–73 | 6–10 (2–3) | Peter Stott Center (739); Portland, Oregon |
| 01/23/2016; 7:05 pm | | at Sacramento State | W 81–63 | 7–10 (3–3) | Colberg Court (1,058); Sacramento, California |
| 01/28/2016; 6:05 pm | | at Eastern Washington | L 83–112 | 7–11 (3–4) | Reese Court (1,617); Cheney, Washington |
| 01/30/2016; 7:00 pm | | at Idaho | L 55–56 | 7–12 (3–5) | Cowan Spectrum (1,546); Moscow, Idaho |
| 02/04/2016; 7:05 pm | | Montana State | W 83–68 | 7–13 (3–6) | Peter Stott Center (623); Portland, Oregon |
| 02/06/2016; 7:05 pm | | Montana | L 80–82 | 7–14 (3–7) | Peter Stott Center (1,045); Portland, Oregon |
| 02/11/2016; 6:00 pm | | at Idaho State | L 71–88 | 8–14 (4–7) | Holt Arena (2,602); Pocatello, Idaho |
| 02/13/2016; 6:00 pm | | at Weber State | L 78–87 | 8–15 (4–8) | Dee Events Center (6,798); Ogden, Utah |
| 02/18/2016; 7:05 pm | | Idaho | L 74–80 | 8–16 (4–9) | Peter Stott Center (920); Portland, Oregon |
| 02/20/2016; 7:05 pm | | Eastern Washington | W 107–91 | 9–16 (5–9) | Peter Stott Center (633); Portland, Oregon |
| 02/25/2016; 5:00 pm | | at North Dakota | L 77–80 | 9–17 (5–10) | Betty Engelstad Sioux Center (1,734); Grand Forks, North Dakota |
| 02/27/2016; 6:00 pm | | at Northern Colorado | W 89–86 | 10–17 (6–10) | Bank of Colorado Arena (1,290); Greeley, Colorado |
| 03/03/2016; 7:05 pm | | Northern Arizona | W 89–81 | 11–17 (7–10) | Peter Stott Center (705); Portland, Oregon |
| 03/05/2016; 7:05 pm | | Southern Utah | W 88–86 | 12–17 (8–10) | Peter Stott Center (622); Portland, Oregon |
Big Sky tournament
| 03/08/2016; 12:05 pm | (8) | vs. (9) Northern Colorado; First Round | W 74–67 | 13–17 | Reno Events Center (1,311); Reno, Nevada |
| 03/10/2016; 12:05 pm | (8) | vs. (1) Weber State; Quarterfinals | L 74–78 | 13–18 | Reno Events Center (1,206); Reno, Nevada |
*Non-conference game. ^{#}Rankings from AP Poll. (#) Tournament seedings in parentheses. All times are in Pacific Time.

== See also ==
2015–16 Portland State Vikings women's basketball team
