= 2015–16 North Dakota Fighting Hawks men's basketball team =

American college basketball season

2015–16 North Dakota Fighting Hawks men's basketball

CIT, First round
- Conference: Big Sky Conference
- Record: 17–16 (10–8 Big Sky)
- Head coach: Brian Jones (10th season)
- Assistant coaches: Shawn Dirden; Steve Grabowski; Jeff Horner
- Home arena: Betty Engelstad Sioux Center

2015–16 Big Sky men's basketball standings
	Conf.				Overall
Team	W		L	PCT	W		L	PCT
Weber State †	15	–	3	.833	26	–	9	.743
Montana	14	–	4	.778	21	–	12	.636
Idaho	12	–	6	.667	21	–	13	.618
Idaho State	11	–	7	.611	16	–	15	.516
Eastern Washington	10	–	8	.556	18	–	16	.529
North Dakota	10	–	8	.556	17	–	16	.515
Montana State	9	–	9	.500	14	–	17	.452
Portland State	8	–	10	.444	13	–	18	.419
Northern Colorado	7	–	11	.389	10	–	21	.323
Sacramento State	6	–	12	.333	14	–	17	.452
Northern Arizona	3	–	15	.167	5	–	25	.167
Southern Utah	3	–	15	.167	5	–	24	.172
† Conference tournament winner

The 2015–16 North Dakota Fighting Hawks Men's Basketball team represented the University of North Dakota during the 2015–16 NCAA Division I men's basketball season. They were led by tenth year head coach Brian Jones and played their home games at the Betty Engelstad Sioux Center. They were members of the Big Sky Conference. They finished the season 17–16, 10–8 in Big Sky play to finish in a tie for fifth place. They defeated Southern Utah and Idaho State to advance to the semifinals of the Big Sky tournament where they lost to Weber State. They were invited to the CollegeInsider.com Tournament where they lost in the first round to UC Irvine.

== Previous season ==
North Dakota finished the season 8–22, 4–14 in Big Sky play to finish in a three-way tie for tenth place. They failed to qualify for the Big Sky tournament.

== Departures ==
Name	Number	Pos.	Height	Weight	Year	Hometown	Notes
Jaron Nash	1	F	6'8"	195	Senior	Waterloo, Iowa	Graduated
Cole Stefan	2	G	6'3"	190	Senior	Minnetonka, Minnesota	Graduated
Estan Tyler	3	G	6'1"	180	Junior	St. Paul, Minnesota	Left the team for personal reasons
Lenny Antwi	12	G	6'1"	190	Senior	Montreal, Quebec	Graduated
Terrel De Rouen	14	G	6'2"	185	Junior	Las Cruces, New Mexico	Left the team for personal reasons
Kraiq Shields	22	F	6'8"	190	Freshman	Kyle, Texas	Transferred to Midland College
Chad Calcaterra	33	F	6'9"	235	Senior	Cloquet, Minnesota	Graduated
Josiah Coleman	35	F	6'5"	195	Junior	Cedar Rapids, Iowa	Transferred to UT Permian Basin
Ryan Salmonson	41	C	6'10"	235	Senior	Colfax, California	Graduated

=== Incoming transfers ===
Name	Number	Pos.	Height	Weight	Year	Hometown	Previous School
Corey Baldwin	1	G	6'4"	195	Junior	Bridgeport, Connecticut	Junior college transferred from Northeastern Oklahoma A&M
Wheeler Baker	13	G	6'2"	175	Sophomore	Minneapolis, Minnesota	Transferred from Albany. Under NCAA transfer rules, Baker will have to sit out for the 2015–16 season. Will have three years of remaining eligibility.

== 2015 incoming recruits ==
College recruiting information
Name	Hometown	School	Height	Weight	Commit date
Adam McDermott; SG	Cedar Rapids, Iowa	Xavier High School	6 ft 4 in (1.93 m)	175 lb (79 kg)	Sep 22, 2014
Adam McDermott; SG	Recruit ratings: Scout: Rivals: (NR)				
Cortez Seales; PG	Eldridge, Iowa	North Scott High School	6 ft 4 in (1.93 m)	180 lb (82 kg)	Sep 23, 2014
Cortez Seales; PG	Recruit ratings: Scout: Rivals: (NR)				
Josh Collins; SF	Minneapolis, Minnesota	De La Salle High School	6 ft 6 in (1.98 m)	200 lb (91 kg)	Sep 28, 2014
Josh Collins; SF	Recruit ratings: Scout: Rivals: (NR)				
Conner Avants; PF	Edmond, Oklahoma	Deer Creek-Lamont High School	6 ft 7 in (2.01 m)	230 lb (100 kg)	Apr 11, 2015
Conner Avants; PF	Recruit ratings: Scout: Rivals: (NR)				
Overall recruit ranking:
Note: In many cases, Scout, Rivals, 247Sports, On3, and ESPN may conflict in their listings of height and weight.; In these cases, the average was taken. ESPN grades are on a 100-point scale.; Sources: "2015 Team Ranking". Rivals.

=== 2016 incoming recruits ===
College recruiting information (2016)
Name	Hometown	School	Height	Weight	Commit date
Billy Brown; SG	Spirit Lake, Iowa	Spirit Lake High School	6 ft 3 in (1.91 m)	160 lb (73 kg)	Jun 22, 2015
Billy Brown; SG	Recruit ratings: Scout: Rivals: (NR)				
Overall recruit ranking:
Note: In many cases, Scout, Rivals, 247Sports, On3, and ESPN may conflict in their listings of height and weight.; In these cases, the average was taken. ESPN grades are on a 100-point scale.; Sources: "2016 Team Ranking". Rivals.

== Roster ==
2015–16 North Dakota Fighting Hawks men's basketball team
Players
Coaches

Pos.	#	Name	Height	Weight	Year	Previous school	Hometown
G	0	Geno Crandall	6 ft 3 in (1.91 m)	170 lb (77 kg)	RS Fr	DeLaSalle	Minneapolis, Minnesota
G	1	Corey Baldwin	6 ft 3 in (1.91 m)	190 lb (86 kg)	Jr	Warren Harding; Northeastern Oklahoma A&M	Bridgeport, Connecticut
F	2	Josh Collins	6 ft 6 in (1.98 m)	200 lb (91 kg)	Fr	DeLaSalle	Minneapolis, Minnesota
G	3	Adam McDermott	6 ft 4 in (1.93 m)	175 lb (79 kg)	Fr	Xavier	Cedar Falls, Iowa
C	5	Carson Shanks	7 ft 0 in (2.13 m)	230 lb (104 kg)	RS So	Prior Lake; Utah State	Prior Lake, Minnesota
C	10	Shane Benton	7 ft 0 in (2.13 m)	230 lb (104 kg)	RS Sr	Linn-Mar	Cedar Rapids, Iowa
G	13	Wheeler Baker (I) (redshirt)	6 ft 2 in (1.88 m)	175 lb (79 kg)	So	Osseo; Albany	Brooklyn Park, Minnesota
G	15	Cortez Seales	6 ft 4 in (1.93 m)	180 lb (82 kg)	Fr	North Scott	Eldridge, Iowa
G	20	Thomas Blake (W)	6 ft 2 in (1.88 m)	200 lb (91 kg)	RS Jr	St. Maria Goretti	Hagerstown, Maryland
G	21	Quinton Hooker	6 ft 0 in (1.83 m)	205 lb (93 kg)	Jr	Park Center	Brooklyn Park, Minnesota
F	25	Dustin Hobaugh (W)	6 ft 5 in (1.96 m)	200 lb (91 kg)	RS Sr	League City; Houston Baptist	League City, Texas
C	31	Bryce Cashman	6 ft 10 in (2.08 m)	225 lb (102 kg)	So	West Platte	Weston, Missouri
F	32	Conner Avants	6 ft 7 in (2.01 m)	230 lb (104 kg)	Fr	Deer Creek	Edmond, Oklahoma
F	43	Drick Berstine	6 ft 8 in (2.03 m)	220 lb (100 kg)	RS So	Cherokee Trail; Denver	Aurora, Colorado
F	50	James Richman (W)	6 ft 7 in (2.01 m)	220 lb (100 kg)	RS Fr	Maple Valley	Tower City, North Dakota

Head coach

- Brian Jones (Northern Iowa)

Assistant coach(es)

- Shawn Dirden (Idaho)
- Steve Grabowski (Minot State)
- Jeff Horner (Iowa)

Legend

- (C) Team captain
- (S) Suspended
- (I) Ineligible
- (W) Walk-on
- Injured
- Current redshirt

Roster

== Schedule ==
Date time, TV	Opponent	Result	Record	Site (attendance) city, state
Non-conference regular season
11/13/2015*; 3:00 pm	Minnesota–Morris	W 99–69	1–0	Betty Engelstad Sioux Center (1,430); Grand Forks, North Dakota
11/17/2015*; 7:00 pm, ESPN3	at Wisconsin	L 64–78	1–1	Kohl Center (17,287); Madison, Wisconsin
11/21/2015*; 3:00 pm	vs. Bowling Green; FGCU Classic	W 77–59	2–1	Alico Arena (3,562); Fort Myers, Florida
11/22/2015*; 6:00 pm, ESPN3	at Florida Gulf Coast; FGCU Classic	L 60–73	2–2	Alico Arena (3,412); Fort Myers, Florida
11/23/2015*; 3:00 pm	vs. Youngstown State; FGCU Classic	L 69–79	2–3	Alico Arena (3,854); Fort Myers, Florida
11/28/2015*; 2:00 pm, MidcoSN	Northern Iowa	L 51–97	2–4	Betty Engelstad Sioux Center (2,302); Grand Forks, North Dakota
12/01/2015*; 7:00 pm	Waldorf; FGCU Classic	W 78–58	3–4	Betty Engelstad Sioux Center (1,521); Grand Forks, North Dakota
12/05/2015*; 7:00 pm	at Bradley	W 65–59 ^{2OT}	4–4	Carver Arena (5,557); Peoria, Illinois
12/11/2015*; 7:30 pm, MidcoSN/FCS Central	North Dakota State	L 67–69	4–5	Betty Engelstad Sioux Center (2,593); Grand Forks, North Dakota
12/17/2015*; 7:30 pm	Valley City State	W 80–59	5–5	Betty Engelstad Sioux Center (1,349); Grand Forks, North Dakota
12/22/2015*; 7:00 pm, FSKC	at Kansas State	L 49–63	5–6	Bramlage Coliseum (12,440); Manhattan, Kansas
Big Sky regular season
12/31/2015; 5:00 pm	Idaho	L 71–74	5–7 (0–1)	Betty Engelstad Sioux Center (1,436); Grand Forks, North Dakota
01/02/2016; 2:00 pm	Eastern Washington	W 79–71	6–7 (1–1)	Betty Engelstad Sioux Center (1,542); Grand Forks, North Dakota
01/07/2016; 8:00 pm	at Weber State	L 62–74	6–8 (1–2)	Dee Events Center (6,456); Ogden, Utah
01/09/2016; 8:00 pm	at Idaho State	W 84–76	7–8 (2–2)	Holt Arena (1,526); Pocatello, Idaho
01/14/2016; 7:00 pm	Montana State	W 85–68	8–8 (3–2)	Betty Engelstad Sioux Center (1,608); Grand Forks, North Dakota
01/16/2016; 2:00 pm, MidcoSN/FCS Central	Montana	L 61–65	8–9 (3–3)	Betty Engelstad Sioux Center (3,287); Grand Forks, North Dakota
01/21/2016; 7:30 pm	at Northern Arizona	W 101–59	9–9 (4–3)	Walkup Skydome; Flagstaff, Arizona
01/23/2016; 5:00 pm	at Southern Utah	W 88–72	10–9 (5–3)	Centrum Arena (1,337); Cedar City, Utah
01/30/2016; 8:00 pm	at Northern Colorado	L 70–71	10–10 (5–4)	Bank of Colorado Arena (2,016); Greeley, Colorado
02/04/2016; 7:00 pm	Idaho State	W 76–60	11–10 (6–4)	Betty Engelstad Sioux Center (1,764); Grand Forks, North Dakota
02/06/2016; 2:00 pm, MidcoSN/FCS Central	Weber State	W 78–71	12–10 (7–4)	Betty Engelstad Sioux Center (2,148); Grand Forks, North Dakota
02/11/2016; 8:05 pm	at Eastern Washington	L 85–95	12–11 (7–5)	Reese Court (1,650); Cheney, Washington
02/13/2015; 9:00 pm	at Idaho	L 64–65	12–12 (7–6)	Cowan Spectrum (1,537); Moscow, Idaho
02/20/2016; 2:00 pm	Northern Colorado	W 74–73	13–12 (8–6)	Betty Engelstad Sioux Center (2,424); Grand Forks, North Dakota
02/25/2016; 7:00 pm, MidcoSN2/FCS Central	Portland State	W 80–77	14–12 (9–6)	Betty Engelstad Sioux Center (1,734); Grand Forks, North Dakota
02/27/2016; 2:00 pm, MidcoSN/FCS Central	Sacramento State	W 97–71	15–12 (10–6)	Betty Engelstad Sioux Center (1,893); Grand Forks, North Dakota
03/03/2016; 8:00 pm	at Montana	L 46–71	15–13 (10–7)	Dahlberg Arena (4,003); Missoula, Montana
03/05/2016; 3:05 pm	at Montana State	L 82–89	15–14 (10–8)	Worthington Arena (2,585); Bozeman, Montana
Big Sky tournament
03/08/2016*; 4:30 pm	vs. Southern Utah; First round	W 85–80	16–14	Reno Events Center (1,406); Reno, Nevada
03/10/2016*; 4:30 pm	vs. Idaho State; Quarterfinals	W 83–49	17–14	Reno Events Center (1,003); Reno, Nevada
03/11/2016*; 7:30 pm	vs. Weber State; Semifinals	L 78–83 ^{OT}	17–15	Reno Events Center (2,362); Reno, Nevada
CIT
03/16/2016*; 7:00 pm	UC Irvine; First round	L 86–89 ^{OT}	17–16	Betty Engelstad Sioux Center (1,263); Grand Forks, North Dakota
*Non-conference game. ^{#}Rankings from AP Poll. (#) Tournament seedings in parentheses. All times are in Central Time.
