= 2015–16 Idaho State Bengals men's basketball team =

American college basketball season

2015–16 Idaho State Bengals men's basketball
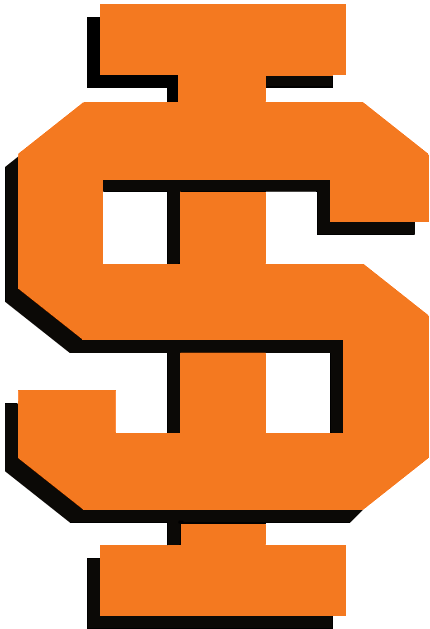
- Conference: Big Sky Conference
- Record: 16–15 (11–7 Big Sky)
- Head coach: Bill Evans (4th season)
- Assistant coaches: Andy Ward; Jay Collins; Tim Walsh
- Home arena: Holt Arena; Reed Gym

2015–16 Big Sky men's basketball standings
	Conf.				Overall
Team	W		L	PCT	W		L	PCT
Weber State †	15	–	3	.833	26	–	9	.743
Montana	14	–	4	.778	21	–	12	.636
Idaho	12	–	6	.667	21	–	13	.618
Idaho State	11	–	7	.611	16	–	15	.516
Eastern Washington	10	–	8	.556	18	–	16	.529
North Dakota	10	–	8	.556	17	–	16	.515
Montana State	9	–	9	.500	14	–	17	.452
Portland State	8	–	10	.444	13	–	18	.419
Northern Colorado	7	–	11	.389	10	–	21	.323
Sacramento State	6	–	12	.333	14	–	17	.452
Northern Arizona	3	–	15	.167	5	–	25	.167
Southern Utah	3	–	15	.167	5	–	24	.172
† Conference tournament winner

The 2015–16 Idaho State Bengals men's basketball team represented Idaho State University during the 2015–16 NCAA Division I men's basketball season. The Bengals, led by fourth year head coach Bill Evans, played their home games at Holt Arena and Reed Gym and were members of the Big Sky Conference. They finished the season 16–15, 11–7 in Big Sky play to finish in fourth place. They lost in the quarterfinals of the Big Sky tournament to North Dakota.

== Roster ==
Number	Name	Position	Height	Weight	Year	Hometown
0	Clint Nwosuh	Guard	6–2	190	Junior	Houston, Texas
1	Geno Luzcando	Guard	6–3	190	Sophomore	Estación Central, Chile
3	Ethan Telfair	Guard	6–0	175	Junior	Coney Island, New York
5	Ben Wilson	Guard	6–6	207	RS–Senior	Bardon, Queensland, Australia
10	Evann Hall	Guard	6–4	210	Senior	Thousand Oaks, California
11	Gary Chivichyan	Guard	6–4	200	Freshman	Los Angeles, California
13	Novak Topalovic	Center	7–0	230	Sophomore	Niš, Serbia
15	Brandon Boyd	Guard	5–11	170	Freshman	Los Angeles, California
22	Ali Faruq–Bey	Guard	6–2	175	Sophomore	Chicago, Illinois
23	Spencer Nicolds	Forward	6–7	190	Sophomore	Gilbert, Arizona
24	Stephen Lennox	Forward	6–8	215	Freshman	Lovington, New Mexico
25	Erik Nakken	Guard	6–3	195	RS–Sophomore	Cedar City, Utah
33	Justin Smith	Guard	6–5	200	Junior	Colorado Springs, Colorado
35	Kyle Ingram	Forward	6–8	220	Junior	Pasadena, California

== Schedule ==
Date time, TV	Opponent	Result	Record	Site (attendance) city, state
Exhibition
10/30/2015*; 7:00 pm	Montana Tech	W 103–65		Reed Gym (1,288); Pocatello, ID
11/06/2015*; 7:00 pm	Westminster (UT)	W 73–71		Reed Gym; Pocatello, ID
Regular season
11/13/2015*; 8:00 pm	Great Falls	W 78–72	1–0	Reed Gym (1,659); Pocatello, ID
11/16/2015*; 7:00 pm	Dickinson State	W 110–85	2–0	Reed Gym (1,405); Pocatello, ID
11/20/2015*; 9:00 pm, P12N	at Washington State	L 67–84	2–1	Beasley Coliseum (2,662); Pullman, WA
11/25/2015*; 4:00 pm	at Denver	L 69–79	2–2	Magness Arena (1,039); Denver, CO
11/27/2015*; 7:00 pm, P12N	at Utah	L 72–102	2–3	Jon M. Huntsman Center (13,185); Salt Lake City, UT
12/05/2015*; 7:00 pm	at Lamar	L 70–82	2–4	Montagne Center (2,137); Beaumont, TX
12/08/2015*; 8:00 pm	at Portland	W 66–65	3–4	Chiles Center (1,089); Portland, OR
12/12/2015*; 7:00 pm	Utah Valley	L 76–100	3–5	Holt Arena (1,622); Pocatello, ID
12/21/2015*; 5:30 pm	vs. North Dakota State; World Vision Classic	L 62–67	3–6	Smith Spectrum (8,156); Logan, UT
12/22/2015*; 8:00 pm	at Utah State; World Vision Classic	L 58–69	3–7	Smith Spectrum (7,746); Logan, UT
12/23/2015*; 5:30 pm	vs. Texas–Rio Grande Valley; World Vision Classic	W 76–64	4–7	Smith Spectrum (8,321); Logan, UT
12/29/2015*; 7:00 pm	Cal State Northridge	W 84–79	5–7	Reed Gym (1,446); Pocatello, ID
01/02/2016; 7:00 pm	at Weber State	L 56–77	5–8 (0–1)	Dee Events Center (6,478); Ogden, UT
01/07/2016; 7:00 pm	Northern Colorado	W 83–78	6–8 (1–1)	Holt Arena (1,426); Pocatello, ID
01/09/2016; 7:00 pm	North Dakota	L 76–84	6–9 (1–2)	Holt Arena (1,526); Pocatello, ID
01/14/2016; 8:00 pm	at Sacramento State	L 71–82	6–10 (1–3)	Colberg Court (781); Sacramento, CA
01/16/2016; 8:00 pm	at Portland State	W 73–70	7–10 (2–3)	Peter Stott Center (739); Portland, OR
01/23/2016; 7:00 pm	Weber State	W 69–68	8–10 (3–3)	Reed Gym (2,236); Pocatello, ID
01/28/2016; 7:00 pm	Southern Utah	W 87–68	9–10 (4–3)	Holt Arena (1,644); Pocatello, ID
01/30/2016; 7:00 pm	Northern Arizona	W 88–66	10–10 (5–3)	Holt Arena (1,813); Pocatello, ID
02/04/2016; 6:00 pm	at North Dakota	L 60–76	10–11 (5–4)	Betty Engelstad Sioux Center (1,764); Grand Forks, ND
02/06/2016; 7:00 pm	at Northern Colorado	W 90–57	11–11 (6–4)	Bank of Colorado Arena (1,268); Greeley, CO
02/11/2016; 7:00 pm	Portland State	W 88–71	12–11 (7–4)	Holt Arena (2,602); Pocatello, ID
02/13/2016; 7:00 pm	Sacramento State	W 66–64	13–11 (8–4)	Holt Arena (1,941); Pocatello, ID
02/18/2016; 7:30 pm	at Northern Arizona	L 68–81	13–12 (8–5)	Walkup Skydome (1,011); Fkagstaff
02/20/2016; 7:00 pm	at Southern Utah	W 89–71	14–12 (9–5)	Centrum Arena (1,568); Cedar City, UT
02/25/2016; 7:00 pm	Montana	L 77–90	14–13 (9–6)	Reed Gym (1,951); Pocatello, ID
02/27/2016; 7:00 pm	Montana State	W 76–69	15–13 (10–6)	Reed Gym (2,566); Pocatello, ID
03/03/2016; 7:00 pm	at Eastern Washington	W 75–71	16–13 (11–6)	Reese Court (1,574); Cheney, WA
03/05/2016; 8:00 pm	at Idaho	L 68–82	16–14 (11–7)	Cowan Spectrum (2,549); Moscow, ID
Big Sky tournament
03/10/2016; 3:30 pm	vs. North Dakota; Quarterfinals	L 49–83	16–15	Reno Events Center (1,003); Reno, NV
*Non-conference game. ^{#}Rankings from AP Poll. (#) Tournament seedings in parentheses. All times are in Mountain Time.
