= Brian Fish =

American basketball player and coach

Current position
- Title: Executive director
- Team: Oregon

Biographical details
- Born: December 20, 1965 (age 60); Seymour, Indiana, U.S.

Playing career
- 1984–1986: Western Kentucky
- 1986–1989: Marshall

Coaching career (HC unless noted)
- 1989–1992: Marshall (assistant)
- 1992–1994: Kansas State (assistant)
- 1994–1996: Creighton (assistant)
- 1996–2002: TCU (assistant)
- 2002–2004: San Diego (assistant)
- 2004–2010: Creighton (assistant)
- 2010–2014: Oregon (assistant)
- 2014–2019: Montana State
- 2019–2022: Georgia (DPD)
- 2022–present: Oregon (Executive Director)

Head coaching record
- Overall: 65–92

Brian Fish (born December 20, 1965) is an American college basketball coach, most recently serving as head coach for the Montana State Bobcats men's basketball team. Fish is currently the director of player personnel for the University of Georgia Bulldogs basketball team.

== Playing career ==
A first-team all-state selection from Seymour High School in Indiana, Fish went on to play college basketball at Western Kentucky and Marshall. He graduated from the latter in 1989.

== Coaching career ==
After graduation, Fish served as a graduate assistant at his alma mater under first-year head coach Dana Altman. He would stay on staff with the Thundering Herd until 1992, when he would rejoin Altman at Kansas State from 1992 to 1994, and follow Altman to Creighton where he served as an assistant from 1994 to 1996. Fish joined Billy Tubbs staff at TCU, and served as an assistant coach until 2002. For the following two seasons, Fish was an assistant at San Diego and part of the Toreros' 2003 NCAA Tournament team, until he returned to Creighton for a second stint with the Bluejays. Fish was part of Altman's staff that produced five-straight 20-win seasons, two NCAA Tournament appearances and four NIT appearances. When Altman accepted the head coaching position at Oregon, Fish once again followed him, serving as an assistant coach on the Oregon staff for four seasons.

Fish was named the 22nd head coach in Montana State history on April 1, 2014. After going 65–92 overall through five seasons, the school decided not to renew Fish's contract. Following his departure from Montana State, Fish was hired as part of the staff at the University of Georgia under head coach Tom Crean.

== Head coaching record ==
Record table
Season	Team	Overall	Conference	Standing	Postseason
Montana State Bobcats (Big Sky Conference) (2014–present)
2014–15	Montana State	7–23	4–14	T–10th	
2015–16	Montana State	14–17	9–9	7th	
2016–17	Montana State	16–16	11–7	6th	
2017–18	Montana State	13–19	6–12	9th	
2018–19	Montana State	15–17	11–9	T–4th	
Montana State:		65–92 (.414)	41–51 (.446)		
Total:		65–92 (.414)			
