= 2015–16 Montana Grizzlies basketball team =

American college basketball season

2015–16 Montana Grizzlies basketball

CBI, First round
- Conference: Big Sky Conference
- Record: 21–12 (14–4 Big Sky)
- Head coach: Travis DeCuire (2nd season)
- Assistant coaches: Ken Bone; Jonathan Metzger-Jones; Chris Cobb
- Home arena: Dahlberg Arena

2015–16 Big Sky men's basketball standings
	Conf.				Overall
Team	W		L	PCT	W		L	PCT
Weber State †	15	–	3	.833	26	–	9	.743
Montana	14	–	4	.778	21	–	12	.636
Idaho	12	–	6	.667	21	–	13	.618
Idaho State	11	–	7	.611	16	–	15	.516
Eastern Washington	10	–	8	.556	18	–	16	.529
North Dakota	10	–	8	.556	17	–	16	.515
Montana State	9	–	9	.500	14	–	17	.452
Portland State	8	–	10	.444	13	–	18	.419
Northern Colorado	7	–	11	.389	10	–	21	.323
Sacramento State	6	–	12	.333	14	–	17	.452
Northern Arizona	3	–	15	.167	5	–	25	.167
Southern Utah	3	–	15	.167	5	–	24	.172
† Conference tournament winner

The 2015–16 Montana Grizzlies basketball team represented the University of Montana during the 2015–16 NCAA Division I men's basketball season. The Grizzlies, led by second year head coach Travis DeCuire, played their home games at Dahlberg Arena and were members of the Big Sky Conference. They finished the season 21–12, 14–4 in Big Sky play to finish in second place. They defeated Sacramento State and Idaho to advance to the championship game of the Big Sky tournament where they lost to Weber State. They were invited to the College Basketball Invitational where they lost in the first round to Nevada.

== Previous season ==
The Grizzlies finished the season 20–13, 14–4 in Big Sky play to finish in a share for the Big Sky regular season championship. They advanced to the championship game of the Big Sky tournament where they lost to Eastern Washington. As a regular season conference champions and #1 overall seed in their conference tournament, they received an automatic bid to the National Invitation Tournament where they lost in the first round to Texas A&M.

== Departures ==
Name	Number	Pos.	Height	Weight	Year	Hometown	Notes
Jordan Gregory	10	G	6'2"	194	Senior	Pueblo, CO	Graduated
Daniel Nwosu	22	G	6'2"	175	Sophomore	Ottawa, ON	Transferred to Newman
Chris Kemp	24	C	6'7"	236	Senior	Baltimore, MD	Graduated
Michael Weisner	33	F	6'7"	193	RS Senior	Walla Walla, WA	Graduated

=== Incoming transfers ===
Name	Number	Pos.	Height	Weight	Year	Hometown	Previous School
Walter Wright	5	G	5'10"	165	Junior	Westbury, CT	Junior college transferred from Snow College
Ahmaad Rorie	14	G	6'1"	175	Sophomore	Tacoma, WA	Transferred from Oregon. Under NCAA transfer rules, Rorie will have to sit out for the 2015–16 season. Will have three years of remaining eligibility.

== 2015 incoming recruits ==
College recruiting information
Name	Hometown	School	Height	Weight	Commit date
Michael Oguine #74 PG	Reseda, CA	Chaminade College Prep	6 ft 0 in (1.83 m)	160 lb (73 kg)	Sep 18, 2014
Michael Oguine #74 PG	Recruit ratings: Scout: Rivals: (69)				
Jared Samuelson #83 SF	Billings, MT	Billings West High School	6 ft 7 in (2.01 m)	205 lb (93 kg)	Aug 17, 2014
Jared Samuelson #83 SF	Recruit ratings: Scout: Rivals: (67)				
Bobby Moorehead; SG	Tacoma, WA	Stadium High School	6 ft 6 in (1.98 m)	N/A	Mar 13, 2015
Bobby Moorehead; SG	Recruit ratings: Scout: Rivals: (NR)				
Overall recruit ranking:
Note: In many cases, Scout, Rivals, 247Sports, On3, and ESPN may conflict in their listings of height and weight.; In these cases, the average was taken. ESPN grades are on a 100-point scale.; Sources: "2015 Team Ranking". Rivals.

=== 2016 incoming recruits ===
College recruiting information (2016)
Name	Hometown	School	Height	Weight	Commit date
Sayeed Pridgett #74 PG	El Cerrito, CA	El Cerrito High School	6 ft 4 in (1.93 m)	175 lb (79 kg)	Sep 7, 2015
Sayeed Pridgett #74 PG	Recruit ratings: Scout: Rivals: (NR)				
Overall recruit ranking:
Note: In many cases, Scout, Rivals, 247Sports, On3, and ESPN may conflict in their listings of height and weight.; In these cases, the average was taken. ESPN grades are on a 100-point scale.; Sources: "2016 Team Ranking". Rivals.

== Roster ==
2015–16 Montana Grizzlies men's basketball team
Players
Coaches

Pos.	#	Name	Height	Weight	Year	Previous school	Hometown
G	1	Mario Jr. Dunn	6 ft 0 in (1.83 m)	172 lb (78 kg)	Jr	Salesian	Oakland, CA
G	2	Riley Bradshaw	6 ft 2 in (1.88 m)	180 lb (82 kg)	RS Jr	Corvallis; Utah State	Corvallis, MT
G	5	Walter Wright	5 ft 10 in (1.78 m)	165 lb (75 kg)	Jr	Wilby; Snow College	Waterbury, CT
G	10	Michael Oguine	6 ft 2 in (1.88 m)	175 lb (79 kg)	Fr	Chaminade Prep	Porter Ranch, CA
F	12	Martin Breunig	6 ft 8 in (2.03 m)	210 lb (95 kg)	RS Sr	St. John’s NW Military Acad. Washington	Leverkusen, Germany
G	14	Ahmaad Rorie (I) (redshirt)	6 ft 1 in (1.85 m)	175 lb (79 kg)	So	Lincoln; Oregon	Tacoma, WA
G	15	Trevor Spoja	6 ft 3 in (1.91 m)	170 lb (77 kg)	Fr	Billings West	Billings, MT
F	20	Fabijan Krslovic	6 ft 8 in (2.03 m)	225 lb (102 kg)	So	St Aloysius	New South Wales, Australia
G	22	Zachary Camel	6 ft 0 in (1.83 m)	166 lb (75 kg)	Fr	Arlee	Polson, MT
G	24	Bobby Moorehead	6 ft 7 in (2.01 m)	190 lb (86 kg)	Fr	Stadium	Tacoma, WA
F	30	Gavin DeJong (W)	6 ft 6 in (1.98 m)	215 lb (98 kg)	So	Manhattan	Manhattan, MT
F	31	Jack Lopez	6 ft 6 in (1.98 m)	215 lb (98 kg)	Jr	Jannali	Bankstown, Australia
G	32	Aaron Misipeka-Ward	6 ft 2 in (1.88 m)	185 lb (84 kg)	Jr	Florence-Carlton	Florence, MT
F	33	Jared Samuelson	6 ft 7 in (2.01 m)	215 lb (98 kg)	Fr	Billings West	Billings, MT
G	34	Brandon Gfeller	6 ft 4 in (1.93 m)	190 lb (86 kg)	Jr	Colfax	Colfax, WA
C	35	Bryden Boehning	6 ft 10 in (2.08 m)	230 lb (104 kg)	RS Fr	Dawson County	Glendive, MT

Head coach

- Travis DeCuire (Montana)

Assistant coach(es)

- Ken Bone (Seattle Pacific)
- Jonathan Metzger-Jones (Pacific)
- Chris Cobb (Menlo)

Legend

- (C) Team captain
- (S) Suspended
- (I) Ineligible
- (W) Walk-on
- Injured
- Current redshirt

Roster

== Schedule ==
Montana's nonconference schedule includes true road games at Kansas, Gonzaga, and North Dakota State. The Grizzlies will also play at Washington and host Boise State.

Date time, TV	Opponent	Result	Record	Site (attendance) city, state
Exhibition
11/03/2015*; 7:00 pm	Whitworth	W 83–64		Dahlberg Arena (2,584); Missoula, MT
Non-conference regular season
11/13/2015*; 7:00 pm	Boise State	W 74–72	1–0	Dahlberg Arena (5,421); Missoula, MT
11/16/2015*; 8:00 pm	at San Jose State	L 61–64	1–1	Event Center Arena (1,231); San Jose, CA
11/21/2015*; 7:00 pm	Carroll (MT)	W 70–61	2–1	Dahlberg Arena (3,012); Missoula, MT
11/25/2015*; 6:00 pm	at North Dakota State	L 53–73	2–2	Scheels Arena (3,536); Fargo, ND
11/29/2015*; 4:30 pm	at Pepperdine	L 63–69	2–3	Firestone Fieldhouse (1,154); Malibu, CA
12/04/2015*; 7:00 pm	San Francisco	W 82–50	3–3	Dahlberg Arena (3,279); Missoula, MT
12/08/2015*; 7:00 pm, RTNW	at No. 20 Gonzaga	L 58–61	3–4	McCarthey Athletic Center (6,000); Spokane, WA
12/12/2015*; 4:00 pm, P12N	at Washington	L 62–92	3–5	Alaska Airlines Arena (6,647); Seattle, WA
12/15/2015*; 7:00 pm	Great Falls	W 79–59	4–5	Dahlberg Arena (2,558); Missoula, MT
12/19/2015*; 12:00 pm, ESPN3	at No. 2 Kansas	L 46–88	4–6	Allen Fieldhouse (16,300); Lawrence, KS
12/22/2015*; 1:00 pm	Montana–Western	W 75–43	5–6	Dahlberg Arena (2,709); Missoula, MT
Big Sky regular season
12/31/2015; 12:00 pm	at Northern Arizona	W 90–84 ^{2OT}	6–6 (1–0)	Walkup Skydome (907); Flagstaff, AZ
01/02/2016; 7:00 pm	at Southern Utah	W 83–66	7–6 (2–0)	Centrum Arena (2,330); Cedar City, UT
01/07/2016; 7:00 pm	Portland State	W 79–66	8–6 (3–0)	Dahlberg Arena (3,451); Missoula, MT
01/09/2016; 7:00 pm	Sacramento State	W 77–58	9–6 (4–0)	Dahlberg Arena (3,846); Missoula, MT
01/14/2016; 7:00 pm	at Northern Colorado	W 73–66	10–6 (5–0)	Bank of Colorado Arena (1,302); Greeley, CO
01/16/2016; 1:00 pm	at North Dakota	W 65–61	11–6 (6–0)	Betty Engelstad Sioux Center (2,387); Grand Forks, ND
01/21/2016; 7:00 pm	Idaho	L 53–68	11–7 (6–1)	Dahlberg Arena (3,733); Missoula, MT
01/23/2016; 7:00 pm	Eastern Washington	W 74–69	12–7 (7–1)	Dahlberg Arena (4,923); Missoula, MT
01/30/2016; 7:00 pm	at Montana State	W 80–72	13–7 (8–1)	Worthington Arena (5,407); Bozeman, MT
02/04/2016; 8:00 pm	at Sacramento State	L 79–83	13–8 (8–2)	Hornets Nest (965); Sacramento, CA
02/06/2016; 8:00 pm	at Portland State	W 82–80	14–8 (9–2)	Peter Stott Center (1,045); Portland, OR
02/11/2016; 7:00 pm	at Southern Utah	W 86–53	15–8 (10–2)	Dahlberg Arena (3,351); Missoula, MT
02/13/2015; 7:00 pm	Northern Arizona	W 85–67	16–8 (11–2)	Dahlberg Arena (4,339); Missoula, MT
02/20/2016; 7:00 pm	Montana State	W 87–78	17–8 (12–2)	Dahlberg Arena (6,552); Missoula, MT
02/25/2016; 7:00 pm	at Idaho State	W 90–77	18–8 (13–2)	Reed Gym (1,951); Pocatello, ID
02/27/2016; 7:00 pm	at Weber State	L 54–60	18–9 (13–3)	Dee Events Center (8,960); Ogden, UT
03/03/2016; 7:00 pm	North Dakota	W 71–46	19–9 (14–3)	Dahlberg Arena (4,003); Missoula, MT
03/05/2016; 7:00 pm	Northern Colorado	W 78–72	19–10 (14–4)	Dahlberg Arena (4,224); Missoula, MT
Big Sky tournament
03/10/2016; 6:30 pm	vs. Sacramento State; Quarterfinals	W 70–53	20–10	Reno Events Center (2,213); Reno, NV
03/11/2016; 9:00 pm	vs. Idaho; Semifinals	W 81–72	21–10	Reno Events Center (2,362); Reno, NV
03/12/2016; 6:45 pm, ESPNU	vs. Weber State; Championship game	L 59–62	21–11	Reno Events Center (2,516); Reno, NV
CBI
03/16/2016*; 8:00 pm	at Nevada; First round	L 75–79	21–12	Lawlor Events Center (4,524); Reno, NV
*Non-conference game. ^{#}Rankings from AP Poll. (#) Tournament seedings in parentheses. All times are in Mountain Time..

== See also ==
- 2015–16 Montana Lady Griz basketball team
