= 2015–16 Northern Colorado Bears men's basketball team =

American college basketball season

2015–16 Northern Colorado Bears men's basketball
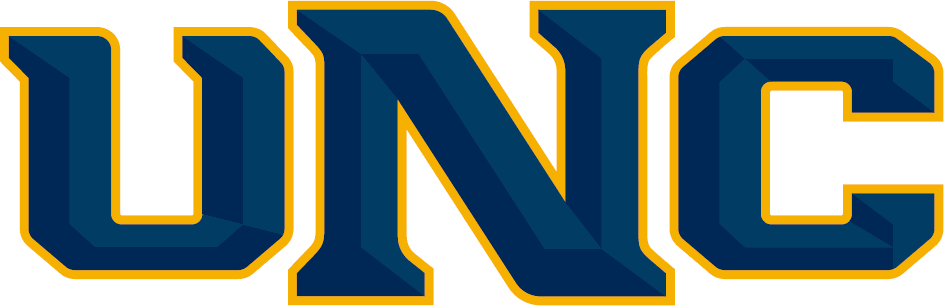
- Conference: Big Sky Conference
- Record: 10–21 (7–11 Big Sky)
- Head coach: B. J. Hill (6th season)
- Assistant coaches: Joel Davidson; Will Hensley; Eric Murphy
- Home arena: Bank of Colorado Arena

2015–16 Big Sky men's basketball standings
	Conf.				Overall
Team	W		L	PCT	W		L	PCT
Weber State †	15	–	3	.833	26	–	9	.743
Montana	14	–	4	.778	21	–	12	.636
Idaho	12	–	6	.667	21	–	13	.618
Idaho State	11	–	7	.611	16	–	15	.516
Eastern Washington	10	–	8	.556	18	–	16	.529
North Dakota	10	–	8	.556	17	–	16	.515
Montana State	9	–	9	.500	14	–	17	.452
Portland State	8	–	10	.444	13	–	18	.419
Northern Colorado	7	–	11	.389	10	–	21	.323
Sacramento State	6	–	12	.333	14	–	17	.452
Northern Arizona	3	–	15	.167	5	–	25	.167
Southern Utah	3	–	15	.167	5	–	24	.172
† Conference tournament winner

The 2015–16 Northern Colorado Bears men's basketball team represented the University of Northern Colorado during the 2015–16 NCAA Division I men's basketball season. The Bears were led by sixth-year head coach B. J. Hill and played their home games at Bank of Colorado Arena. They were a member of the Big Sky Conference. The Bears finished the season 10–21, 7–11 in Big Sky play to finish in ninth place. They lost to Portland State in the first round of the Big Sky tournament.

On April 21, 2016, the school fired head coach B. J. Hill amid an NCAA investigation into "serious and concerning" allegations of violations within the program. On May 1, the school hired Jeff Linder as head coach.

== Previous season ==
The Bears finished the 2014–15 season 15–15, 10–8 in Big Sky play to finish in fifth place. They lost in the quarterfinals of the Big Sky tournament to Northern Arizona.

== Departures ==
Name	Number	Pos.	Height	Weight	Year	Hometown	Notes
Corey Spence	0	G	5'9"	175	Senior	Baltimore, Maryland	Graduated
Cody McDavis	1	F	6'8"	230	Junior	Phoenix, Arizona	Left the team for personal reasons
Tevin Svihovec	5	G	6'2"	190	Senior	Kingwood, Texas	Graduated
Dominique Lee	13	F	6'5"	215	Senior	Oakland, California	Graduated
Tim Huskisson	22	F	6'5"	210	Senior	Willard, Missouri	Graduated
Collin Sanger	23	F	6'5"	200	Freshman	Sterling, Colorado	Left the team for personal reasons
Drew Bender	42	G	6'5"	195	Sophomore	Phoenix, Arizona	Transferred to Cal State East Bay
Dwight Smith	44	G	6'4"	190	RS Senior	Omaha, Nebraska	Graduated

=== Incoming transfers ===
Name	Number	Pos.	Height	Weight	Year	Hometown	Previous School
Chaz Glotta	13	G	6'2"	172	Sophomore	St. Louis, Missouri	Transferred from Southern Illinois. Under NCAA transfer rules, Glotta will have to sit out for the 2015–16 season. Will have three years of remaining eligibility.
Tanner Morgan	20	F	6'9"	234	Junior	Salem, Oregon	Junior college transferred from Casper College
Dallas Anglin	55	G	6'2"	180	RS Junior	Montclair, New Jersey	Transferred from Southern Miss. Under NCAA transfer rules, Anglin has to sit out until January and will be eligible to start in January during the 2015–16 season. Anglin will have one and a half years of remaining eligibility.

== 2015 incoming recruits ==
College recruiting information
Name	Hometown	School	Height	Weight	Commit date
Miles Seward; SG	Toronto, Ontario	Athlete Institute Basketball Academy	6 ft 2 in (1.88 m)	172 lb (78 kg)	Nov 5, 2014
Miles Seward; SG	Recruit ratings: Scout: Rivals: (70)				
Jordan Davis #78 PG	Las Vegas, Nevada	Canyon Springs High School	6 ft 1 in (1.85 m)	165 lb (75 kg)	
Jordan Davis #78 PG	Recruit ratings: Scout: Rivals: (68)				
Overall recruit ranking:
Note: In many cases, Scout, Rivals, 247Sports, On3, and ESPN may conflict in their listings of height and weight.; In these cases, the average was taken. ESPN grades are on a 100-point scale.; Sources: "2015 Team Ranking". Rivals.

=== 2016 incoming recruits ===
College recruiting information (2015)
Name	Hometown	School	Height	Weight	Commit date
Michael Ranson; SG	Pueblo, Colorado	Central High School	6 ft 2 in (1.88 m)	185 lb (84 kg)	Jun 18, 2015
Michael Ranson; SG	Recruit ratings: Scout: Rivals: (NR)				
Overall recruit ranking:
Note: In many cases, Scout, Rivals, 247Sports, On3, and ESPN may conflict in their listings of height and weight.; In these cases, the average was taken. ESPN grades are on a 100-point scale.; Sources: "2016 Team Ranking". Rivals.

== Roster ==
2015–16 Northern Colorado Bears men's basketball team
Players
Coaches

Pos.	#	Name	Height	Weight	Year	Previous school	Hometown
G	0	Jordan Davis	6 ft 2 in (1.88 m)	185 lb (84 kg)	Fr	Canyon Springs	Las Vegas, Nevada
G	2	Cameron Michael	6 ft 5 in (1.96 m)	185 lb (84 kg)	Jr	Air Force	Loveland, Colorado
G	4	Tyler Loose (W)	6 ft 0 in (1.83 m)	185 lb (84 kg)	Jr	Casper College	Laramie, Wyoming
F	5	Jamal Evans	6 ft 7 in (2.01 m)	205 lb (93 kg)	Jr	Midland College	St. Petersburg, Florida
F	10	Ibrahim Sylla	6 ft 8 in (2.03 m)	220 lb (100 kg)	RS Fr	South	Denver, Colorado
F	11	Spencer Mathis	6 ft 7 in (2.01 m)	195 lb (88 kg)	So	Valley	Las Vegas, Nevada
G	12	Jonah Radebaugh (W)	6 ft 2 in (1.88 m)	165 lb (75 kg)	Fr	Northglen	Thornton, Colorado
G	13	Chaz Glotta (I) (redshirt)	6 ft 2 in (1.88 m)	170 lb (77 kg)	So	Southern Illinois	O'Fallon, Missouri
G	15	Miles Seward	6 ft 3 in (1.91 m)	175 lb (79 kg)	Fr	Athlete Institute Basketball Academy	Toronto
F	20	Tanner Morgan	6 ft 9 in (2.06 m)	230 lb (104 kg)	Jr	Casper College	Salem, Oregon
G	24	Anthony Johnson	6 ft 2 in (1.88 m)	190 lb (86 kg)	Jr	Decatur Central	Indianapolis, Indiana
G	25	Jordan Wilson	5 ft 7 in (1.7 m)	155 lb (70 kg)	Jr	Windward	Los Angeles, California
G	30	Jon'te Dotson (W)	6 ft 3 in (1.91 m)	185 lb (84 kg)	Jr	Lincoln	Denver, Colorado
F	33	Jeremy Verhagen	6 ft 10 in (2.08 m)	220 lb (100 kg)	RS So	Florence	Florence, Arizona
F	40	Kenny Lesley	6 ft 8 in (2.03 m)	215 lb (98 kg)	Fr	Christian Brothers College	Elsberry, Missouri
G	55	Dallas Anglin	6 ft 1 in (1.85 m)	185 lb (84 kg)	RS Jr	Southern Miss	Montclair, New Jersey

Head coach

- B. J. Hill (Grand View)

Assistant coach(es)

- Joel Davidson (Wyoming)
- Will Hensley (Northern Arizona)
- Eric Murphy (Penn State Beaver)

Legend

- (C) Team captain
- (S) Suspended
- (I) Ineligible
- (W) Walk-on
- Injured
- Current redshirt

Roster

== Schedule ==
Date time, TV	Opponent	Result	Record	Site (attendance) city, state
Non-conference regular season
11/13/2015*; 6:00 pm, ESPN3	at No. 4 Kansas; Maui Invitational tournament Opening Round	L 72–109	0–1	Allen Fieldhouse (16,300); Lawrence, Kansas
11/17/2015*; 7:00 pm	Colorado Christian	W 85–70	1–1	Bank of Colorado Arena (1,150); Greeley, Colorado
11/21/2015*; 5:00 pm	UMBC; Maui on the Mainland	L 72–81	1–2	Bank of Colorado Arena (1,121); Greeley, Colorado
11/22/2015*; 2:30 pm	Austin Peay; Maui on the Mainland	L 76–91	1–3	Bank of Colorado Arena (1,038); Greeley, Colorado
11/25/2015*; 7:00 pm	Nebraska–Omaha	L 85–105	1–4	Bank of Colorado Arena (1,106); Greeley, Colorado
11/29/2015*; 1:00 pm, P12N	at Colorado	L 52–82	1–5	Coors Events Center (7,424); Boulder, Colorado
12/03/2015*; 7:00 pm	at UC Riverside	L 66–77	1–6	UC Riverside Student Recreation Center (603); Riverside, California
12/09/2015*; 7:00 pm	York (NE)	W 91–58	2–6	Bank of Colorado Arena (1,052); Greeley, Colorado
12/13/2015*; 5:00 pm, CET	Colorado State	W 73–64	3–6	Bank of Colorado Arena (1,576); Greeley, Colorado
12/16/2015*; 7:00 pm, CET	Denver	L 77–81	3–7	Bank of Colorado Arena (1,245); Greeley, Colorado
12/21/2015*; 5:00 pm	at Jacksonville State	L 76–79	3–8	Pete Mathews Coliseum (821); Jacksonville, Alabama
12/23/2015*; 6:00 pm, SECN	vs. Mississippi State	L 69–93	3–9	Mississippi Coliseum (4,512); Jackson, Mississippi
Big Sky regular season
12/31/2015; 5:00 pm, CET	Eastern Washington	W 96–90	4–9 (1–0)	Bank of Colorado Arena (1,125); Greeley, Colorado
01/02/2016; 2:00 pm	Idaho	L 70–75	4–10 (1–1)	Bank of Colorado Arena (1,145); Greeley, Colorado
01/07/2016; 7:00 pm	at Idaho State	L 78–83	4–10 (1–2)	Holt Arena (1,462); Pocatello, Idaho
01/09/2016; 7:00 pm	at Weber State	L 68–85	4–11 (1–3)	Dee Events Center (6,518); Ogden, Utah
01/14/2016; 7:00 pm, CET	Montana	L 66–73	4–12 (1–4)	Bank of Colorado Arena (1,302); Greeley, Colorado
01/16/2016; 5:00 pm	Montana State	W 78–76	5–12 (2–4)	Bank of Colorado Arena (1,120); Greeley, Colorado
01/21/2016; 7:00 pm	at Southern Utah	W 90–80	6–13 (3–4)	Centrum Arena (1,356); Cedar City, Utah
01/23/2016; 2:00 pm	at Northern Arizona	W 84–79	7–13 (4–4)	Walkup Skydome (1,526); Flagstaff, Arizona
01/30/2016; 7:00 pm, CET	North Dakota	W 71–70	8–13 (5–4)	Bank of Colorado Arena (2,016); Greeley, Colorado
02/04/2016; 7:00 pm, CET	Weber State	L 54–64	8–14 (5–5)	Bank of Colorado Arena (1,110); Greeley, Colorado
02/06/2016; 7:00 pm	Idaho State	L 57–90	8–15 (5–6)	Bank of Colorado Arena (1,268); Greeley, Colorado
02/11/2016; 7:00 pm	at Idaho	L 67–73	8–16 (5–7)	Cowan Spectrum (1,012); Moscow, Idaho
02/13/2016; 3:00 pm	at Eastern Washington	L 80–97	8–17 (5–8)	Reese Court (1,689); Cheney, Washington
02/20/2016; 1:00 pm	at North Dakota	L 73–74	8–18 (5–9)	Betty Engelstad Sioux Center (2,424); Grand Forks, North Dakota
02/25/2016; 7:00 pm, CET	Sacramento State	W 72–67	9–18 (6–9)	Bank of Colorado Arena (1,295); Greeley, Colorado
02/27/2016; 7:00 pm, CET	Portland State	L 86–89	9–19 (6–10)	Bank of Colorado Arena (1,290); Greeley, Colorado
03/03/2016; 7:05 pm	at Montana State	L 63–81	9–20 (6–11)	Worthington Arena (2,227); Bozeman, Montana
03/05/2016; 7:00 pm	at Montana	W 78–72	10–20 (7–11)	Dahlberg Arena (4,224); Missoula, Montana
Big Sky tournament
03/08/2016; 12:05 pm	vs. Portland State; First round	L 67–74	10–21	Reno Events Center (1,311); Reno, Nevada
*Non-conference game. ^{#}Rankings from AP Poll. (#) Tournament seedings in parentheses. All times are in Mountain Time.
