= 2015–16 Weber State Wildcats men's basketball team =

American college basketball season

2015–16 Weber State Wildcats men's basketball

Big Sky Regular Season and tournament champions Gulf Coast Showcase champions

NCAA tournament, First Round
- Conference: Big Sky Conference
- Record: 26–9 (15–3 Big Sky)
- Head coach: Randy Rahe (10th season)
- Assistant coaches: Eric Duft; Garrett Lever; Steve Smiley
- Home arena: Dee Events Center

2015–16 Big Sky men's basketball standings
	Conf.				Overall
Team	W		L	PCT	W		L	PCT
Weber State †	15	–	3	.833	26	–	9	.743
Montana	14	–	4	.778	21	–	12	.636
Idaho	12	–	6	.667	21	–	13	.618
Idaho State	11	–	7	.611	16	–	15	.516
Eastern Washington	10	–	8	.556	18	–	16	.529
North Dakota	10	–	8	.556	17	–	16	.515
Montana State	9	–	9	.500	14	–	17	.452
Portland State	8	–	10	.444	13	–	18	.419
Northern Colorado	7	–	11	.389	10	–	21	.323
Sacramento State	6	–	12	.333	14	–	17	.452
Northern Arizona	3	–	15	.167	5	–	25	.167
Southern Utah	3	–	15	.167	5	–	24	.172
† Conference tournament winner

The 2015–16 Weber State Wildcats men's basketball team represented Weber State University during the 2015–16 NCAA Division I men's basketball season. The Wildcats were led by tenth-year head coach Randy Rahe and played their home games at the Dee Events Center in Ogden, Utah. They were members of the Big Sky Conference. The Wilsdcats finished the season 26–9, 15–3 in Big Sky play to win the regular season championship. They defeated Portland State, North Dakota, and Montana in the Big Sky tournament. to earn the conference's automatic bid to the NCAA tournament. As a No. 15 seed in the NCAA Tournament, they lost to Xavier in the first round.

== Previous season ==
The Wildcats finished the 2014–15 season 13–17, 8–10 in Big Sky play to finish in a tie for seventh place. They lost in the quarterfinals of the Big Sky tournament to Montana.

== Departures ==
Name	Number	Pos.	Height	Weight	Year	Hometown	Notes
Chris Golden	0	G	6'2"	160	Junior	Milwaukee, Wisconsin	Graduated & transferred to CSU Pueblo
Jaelyn Johnson-Coston	2	F	6'6"	210	Junior	Bronx, New York	Transferred
James Hajek	45	C	6'10"	250	Senior	Omaha, Nebraska	Graduated
Ryan Van Pelt	50	C	6'10"	220	RS Freshman	Lindon, Utah	Transferred to Colorado–Colorado Springs

=== Incoming transfers ===
Name	Number	Pos.	Height	Weight	Year	Hometown	Previous School
Dusty Baker	25	G	6'5"	190	Sophomore	Rancho Santa Margarita, California	Junior college transferred Saddleback College

== 2015 incoming recruits ==
College recruiting
Name	Hometown	School	Height	Weight	Commit date
Jordan Dallas #68 PF	Long Beach, California	Long Beach Polytechnic High School	6 ft 9 in (2.06 m)	200 lb (91 kg)	Oct 27, 2014
Jordan Dallas #68 PF	Recruit ratings: Scout: Rivals: (65)				
Riley Court #108 PF	Pleasant Grove, Utah	Plesasant Grove High School	6 ft 4 in (1.93 m)	200 lb (91 kg)	Sep 4, 2014
Riley Court #108 PF	Recruit ratings: Scout: Rivals: (60)				
Juwan Williams; SF	Richmond, Texas	Travis High School	6 ft 5 in (1.96 m)	190 lb (86 kg)	Sep 20, 2014
Juwan Williams; SF	Recruit ratings: Scout: Rivals: (NR)				
Emmanuel Nzekwesi; SF	Trophy Club, Texas	Byron Nelson High School	6 ft 7 in (2.01 m)	215 lb (98 kg)	Sep 20, 2014
Emmanuel Nzekwesi; SF	Recruit ratings: Scout: Rivals: (NR)				
Cody John; SF	Mississauga, ON	Wasatch Academy	6 ft 3 in (1.91 m)	N/A	Mar 28, 2015
Cody John; SF	Recruit ratings: Scout: Rivals: (NR)				
Overall recruit ranking:
Note: In many cases, Scout, Rivals, 247Sports, On3, and ESPN may conflict in their listings of height and weight.; In these cases, the average was taken. ESPN grades are on a 100-point scale.; Sources: "2015 Team Ranking". Rivals.

=== 2016 incoming recruits ===
College recruiting (2016)
Name	Hometown	School	Height	Weight	Commit date
Spencer Johnson; SF #90	American Fork, Utah	American Fork High School	6 ft 4 in (1.93 m)	170 lb (77 kg)	Sep 23, 2015
Spencer Johnson; SF #90	Recruit ratings: Scout: Rivals: (60)				
Overall recruit ranking:
Note: In many cases, Scout, Rivals, 247Sports, On3, and ESPN may conflict in their listings of height and weight.; In these cases, the average was taken. ESPN grades are on a 100-point scale.; Sources: "2016 Team Ranking". Rivals.

== Roster ==
2015–16 Weber State Wildcats men's basketball team
Players
Coaches

Pos.	#	Name	Height	Weight	Year	Previous school	Hometown
F	0	Kiko Stavrev	6 ft 8 in (2.03 m)	210 lb (95 kg)	Fr	Myerscough	Sofia, Bulgaria
G/F	2	Juwan Williams	6 ft 5 in (1.96 m)	190 lb (86 kg)	Fr	Travis	Richmond, Texas
C	3	Jordan Dallas	6 ft 10 in (2.08 m)	220 lb (100 kg)	Fr	Long Beach Poly	Long Beach, California
G	5	Cody John	6 ft 3 in (1.91 m)	190 lb (86 kg)	Fr	Wasatch Academy	Toronto, Ontario
G	11	Hayden Hunter	5 ft 11 in (1.8 m)	170 lb (77 kg)	So	Richland	North Richland, Texas
G	15	Jeremiah Jefferson	6 ft 2 in (1.88 m)	185 lb (84 kg)	RS Fr	Triple A Academy	Dallas, Texas
G/F	20	J. C. Kennedy (W)	6 ft 4 in (1.93 m)	175 lb (79 kg)	So	Skyview	Nampa, Idaho
F/C	21	Joel Bolomboy	6 ft 9 in (2.06 m)	235 lb (107 kg)	Sr	Keller	Fort Worth, Texas
G	22	Ryan Richardson	6 ft 4 in (1.93 m)	185 lb (84 kg)	So	Dobson	Mesa, Arizona
G	23	Richaud Gittens	6 ft 4 in (1.93 m)	200 lb (91 kg)	Jr	Marcos de Niza	Tempe, Arizona
G	24	McKay Cannon	6 ft 1 in (1.85 m)	185 lb (84 kg)	Fr	Highlands Ranch	Highlands Ranch, Colorado
G/F	25	Dusty Baker	6 ft 4 in (1.93 m)	195 lb (88 kg)	So	Saddleback College	Rancho Santa Margarita, California
G	30	Jeremy Senglin	6 ft 2 in (1.88 m)	195 lb (88 kg)	Jr	Bowie	Arlington, Texas
F	35	Kyndahl Hill	6 ft 7 in (2.01 m)	225 lb (102 kg)	Jr	Humble	Humble, Texas
F/C	44	Zach Braxton	6 ft 9 in (2.06 m)	250 lb (113 kg)	RS Fr	Highlands Ranch	Highlands Ranch, Colorado

Head coach

- Randy Rahe (Buena Vista)

Assistant coach(es)

- Eric Duft (Sterling (KS))
- Garrett Lever (Seattle)
- Steve Smiley (Northern State)

Legend

- (C) Team captain
- (S) Suspended
- (I) Ineligible
- (W) Walk-on
- Injured
- Current redshirt

Roster

== Schedule ==
Date time, TV	Rank^{#}	Opponent^{#}	Result	Record	Site (attendance) city, state
Exhibition
11/07/2015*; 7:00 pm		Southern Virginia	W 83–57		Dee Events Center; Ogden, Utah
Non-conference regular season
11/13/2015*; 7:00 pm, KJZZ		Utah State; Old Oquirrh Bucket	L 70–73	0–1	Dee Events Center (8,964); Ogden, Utah
11/16/2015*; 6:00 pm		at South Dakota State	L 68–85	0–2	Frost Arena (1,639); Brookings, South Dakota
11/19/2015*; 7:00 pm, KJZZ		Antelope Valley; Gulf Coast Showcase opening round	W 90–47	1–2	Dee Events Center (5,876); Ogden, Utah
11/23/2015*; 6:30 pm		vs. Central Michigan; Gulf Coast Showcase quarterfinals	W 63–60	2–2	Germain Arena (523); Estero, Florida
11/24/2015*; 6:30 pm		vs. Drake; Gulf Coast Showcase semifinals	W 74–58	3–2	Germain Arena (1,053); Estero, Florida
11/25/2015*; 6:30 pm		vs. Murray State; Gulf Coast Showcase championship	W 75–59	4–2	Germain Arena (1,102); Estero, Florida
12/01/2015*; 7:00 pm, KJZZ		Pacific Union	W 95–57	5–2	Dee Events Center (5,709); Ogden, Utah
12/05/2015*; 1:00 pm, BYUtv		vs. BYU; Old Oquirrh Bucket	L 68–73	5–3	Vivint Smart Home Arena (15,121); Salt Lake City, Utah
12/09/2015*; 7:00 pm		at Utah Valley; Old Oquirrh Bucket	L 81–84 ^{2OT}	5–4	UCCU Center (2,860); Salt Lake City, Utah
12/13/2015*; 12:00 pm, RTUT		at Denver	L 68–69	5–5	Magness Arena (1,103); Denver, Colorado
12/18/2015*; 7:00 pm		vs. Portland; Far West Classic	W 92–82 ^{OT}	6–5	Moda Center (3,036); Portland, Oregon
12/22/2015*; 7:00 pm, KJZZ		South Dakota State	W 99–95	7–5	Dee Events Center (6,053); Ogden, Utah
12/28/2015*; 7:00 pm, KJZZ		Multnomah	W 114–47	8–5	Dee Events Center (5,906); Ogden, Utah
Big Sky regular season
01/02/2016; 7:00 pm, KJZZ		Idaho State	W 77–56	9–5 (1–0)	Dee Events Center (6,478); Ogden, Utah
01/07/2016; 7:00 pm, KJZZ		North Dakota	W 74–62	10–5 (2–0)	Dee Events Center (6,456); Ogden, Utah
01/09/2016; 7:00 pm, KJZZ		Northern Colorado	W 85–68	11–5 (3–0)	Dee Events Center (6,518); Ogden, Utah
01/14/2016; 8:00 pm		at Portland State	W 73–58	12–5 (4–0)	Peter Stott Center (838); Portland, Oregon
01/16/2016; 8:00 pm		at Sacramento State	W 85–74	13–5 (5–0)	Hornets Nest (898); Sacramento, California
01/23/2016; 7:00 pm		at Idaho State	L 68–69	13–6 (5–1)	Reed Gym (2,236); Pocatello, Idaho
01/28/2016; 7:00 pm, KJZZ		Northern Arizona	W 76–66	14–6 (6–1)	Dee Events Center (6,381); Ogden, Utah
01/30/2016; 7:00 pm, KJZZ		Southern Utah; Old Oquirrh Bucket	W 77–50	15–6 (7–1)	Dee Events Center (7,052); Ogden, Utah
02/04/2016; 7:00 pm		at Northern Colorado	W 64–54	16–6 (8–1)	Bank of Colorado Arena (1,110); Greeley, Colorado
02/06/2016; 1:00 pm		at North Dakota	L 71–78	16–7 (8–2)	Betty Engelstad Sioux Center (2,148); Grand Forks, North Dakota
02/11/2016; 7:00 pm, KJZZ		Sacramento State	W 63–50	17–7 (9–2)	Dee Events Center (6,504); Ogden, Utah
02/13/2016; 7:00 pm, KJZZ		Portland State	W 87–78	18–7 (10–2)	Dee Events Center (6,798); Ogden, Utah
02/18/2016; 7:00 pm		at Southern Utah; Old Oquirrh Bucket	W 87–83	19–7 (11–2)	Centrum Arena (2,028); Cedar City, Utah
02/20/2016; 4:00 pm		at Northern Arizona	W 77–74	20–7 (12–2)	Walkup Skydome (1,343); Flagstaff, Arizona
02/25/2016; 7:00 pm, KJZZ		Montana State	W 68–60	21–7 (13–2)	Dee Events Center (7,340); Ogden, Utah
02/27/2016; 7:00 pm, KJZZ		Montana	W 60–54	22–7 (14–2)	Dee Events Center (8,960); Ogden, Utah
03/03/2016; 8:00 pm		at Idaho	L 58–62	22–8 (14–3)	Cowan Spectrum (1,472); Moscow, Idaho
03/05/2016; 3:00 pm		at Eastern Washington	W 79–77	23–8 (15–3)	Reese Court (1,914); Cheney, Washington
Big Sky tournament
03/10/2016; 1:00 pm	(1)	vs. (8) Portland State; Quarterfinals	W 78–74	24–8	Reno Events Center (1,206); Reno, Nevada
03/11/2016; 6:30 pm	(1)	vs. (5) North Dakota; Semifinals	W 83–78 ^{OT}	25–8	Reno Events Center (2,362); Reno, Nevada
03/12/2016; 6:45 pm, ESPNU	(1)	vs. (2) Montana; Championship	W 62–59	26–8	Reno Events Center (2,516); Reno, Nevada
NCAA tournament
03/18/2016*; 7:20 pm, truTV	(15 E)	vs. (2 E) No. 9 Xavier; First Round	L 53–71	26–9	Scottrade Center (14,425); St. Louis, Missouri
*Non-conference game. ^{#}Rankings from AP Poll. (#) Tournament seedings in parentheses. E=East Region. All times are in Mountain Time.
