= Tohono Oʼodham Community College =

Tribal college in Haivana Nakya, Arizona

- Motto: Nia, oya g t-taccui am hab e-ju
- Motto in English: See, our dream fulfilled
- Type: Public tribal land-grant community college
- Established: 1998; 28 years ago
- Academic affiliations: American Indian Higher Education Consortium; Space-grant
- President: Jane Latane
- Students: 200+
- Location: Haivana Nakya (Sells mailing address), Arizona, United States; 31.990247°N 111.715651°W
- Campus: Rural Reserve
- Nickname: Jegos
- Website: www.tocc.edu

Tohono Oʼodham Community College (TOCC) is a public tribal land-grant community college in Haivana Nakya, Arizona. As of fall 2023, TOCC's student body was 96 percent American Indian/Alaskan Native. Tohono Oʼodham Community College serves approximately 1174 students (80 percent female; 20 percent male). As of 2012, the college's faculty and staff was 57 percent American Indian, half of whom were Oʼodham.

Although it is a public institution open to students of all backgrounds, the college maintains a deep connection to the Tohono Oʼodham culture. As a tribal college, TOCC places a special emphasis on not only serving the educational needs of its local residents, particularly the Tohono Oʼodham Nation, but also preserving and transmitting the Oʼodham Himdag (cultural way of life). As part of their curriculum, all students are exposed to the Himdag, which encompasses a wide array of traditional beliefs and practices of this native group.

== History ==
TOCC was founded in 1998 when the Tohono Oʼodham Nation chartered TOCC in Sells, Arizona. The tribe's career center formerly provided associate degrees and a variety of certificates. TOCC began accepting students two years later, with classes accredited through an intergovernmental agreement with Pima County Community College District in Tucson, AZ. TOCC was fully accredited by the North Central Association of Colleges and Schools in February 2003. The following year, the college was designated a land-grant college alongside other tribal colleges originally designated in 1994.

== Academics ==
TOCC offers students the opportunity to earn associate degrees in liberal arts, business administration, and science and numerous certificates.

== Partnerships ==
TOCC is a member of the American Indian Higher Education Consortium (AIHEC), which is a community of tribally and federally chartered institutions working to strengthen tribal nations and make a lasting difference in the lives of American Indians and Alaska Natives. TOCC was created in response to the higher education needs of American Indians. TOCC generally serves geographically isolated populations that have no other means accessing education beyond the high school level.

== Notable staff ==
- Gabriella Cázares-Kelly, former academic adviser, Pima County Recorder (2021–present)
- Vivian Juan-Saunders, former vice president of Tohono Oʼodham Community College, tribal chair (2003–2007)

== See also ==
- American Indian College Fund (AICF)
