= 2015–16 West Coast Conference men's basketball season =

- League: NCAA Division I
- Sport: Men's basketball
- Teams: 10
- TV partner(s): National: ESPN, BYUtv, WCC TV

Regular season
- Season champions: Saint Mary's & Gonzaga
- Season MVP: Kyle Collinsworth, BYU

Tournament
- Champions: Gonzaga
- Runners-up: Saint Mary's
- Finals MVP: Kyle Wiltjer, Gonzaga

Basketball seasons
- ← 14–15 16–17 →

2015–16 West Coast Conference men's basketball standings
	Conf.				Overall
Team	W		L	PCT	W		L	PCT
Saint Mary's	15	–	3	.833	29	–	6	.829
Gonzaga †	15	–	3	.833	28	–	8	.778
BYU	13	–	5	.722	26	–	11	.703
Pepperdine	10	–	8	.556	18	–	14	.563
San Francisco	8	–	10	.444	15	–	15	.500
Santa Clara	7	–	11	.389	11	–	20	.355
Portland	6	–	12	.333	12	–	20	.375
Loyola Marymount	6	–	12	.333	14	–	17	.452
Pacific*	6	–	12	.333	8	–	20	.286
San Diego	4	–	14	.222	9	–	21	.300
† Conference tournament winner *ineligible for postseason due to self probation

The 2015–16 West Coast Conference men's basketball season began with practices in October 2015 and ended with the 2016 West Coast Conference men's basketball tournament at the Orleans Arena on March 4–8, 2016 in Paradise, Nevada. The regular season began in November, with the conference schedule starting at the end of December.

This was the 65th season for WCC men's basketball, and the 27th under its current name of "West Coast Conference". The conference was founded in 1952 as the California Basketball Association, became the West Coast Athletic Conference in 1956, and dropped the word "Athletic" in 1989.

== Pre-season ==
- Pre-season media day took place in October at the Time Warner Cable SportsNet and Time Warner Cable Deportes Studios. Video interviews were to be hosted on the WCC's streaming video outlet, TheW.tv, beginning at 11:30 AM PDT. Jeff Lampe of WCC Live interviewed each coach and got a preview of their respective season. The regional television schedule announcement, the Pre-season Conference team, and the pre-season coaches rankings were some of the additional events that took place.

=== 2015–16 West Coast Men's Basketball Media Poll ===
The Pre-season poll was announced at the conference's media day in October 2016.

Rank, school (first-place votes), points
1. Gonzaga (9), 81
2. BYU (1), 73
3. Pepperdine, 62
4. St. Mary's, 58
5. Portland, 43
6. Santa Clara, 37
7. Pacific, 32
7. San Francisco, 32
9. San Diego, 17
10. Loyola Marymount, 15

=== 2015–16 West Coast Men's Preseason All-West Conference Team ===
Player, school, yr., pos.

- Kyle Collinsworth, BYU, Sr., G
- Chase Fischer, BYU, Sr., G
- Przemek Karnowski, Gonzaga, Sr., C
- Domantas Sabonis, Gonzaga, So., F
- Kyle Wiltjer, Gonzaga, Sr., F
- T. J. Wallace, Pacific, Jr., G
- Stacy Davis, Pepperdine, Sr., F
- Alec Wintering, Portland, Sr., G
- Tim Derksen, San Francisco, Sr., G
- Jared Brownridge, Santa Clara, Jr., G

=== College Sports Madness Preseason All-West Conference Team ===
- Coach of the Year - Mark Few, Gonzaga
- Player of the Year - Kyle Wiltjer, Gonzaga
- Freshman of the Year - Josh Perkins, Gonzaga

First Team

- Jared Brownridge, G, Santa Clara
- Kyle Collinsworth, G, BYU
- Stacy Davis, G/F, Pepperdine
- Kyle Wiltjer, F, Gonzaga
- Domantas Sabonis, F/C, Gonzaga

Second Team

- Alec Wintering, G, Portland
- T.J. Wallace, G, Pacific
- Tim Derksen, G/F, San Francisco
- Jett Raines, F, Pepperdine
- Przemek Karnowski, F/C, Gonzaga

Third Team

- Chase Fischer, G, BYU
- Joe Rahon, G, Saint Mary's
- Shawn Olden, G, Pepperdine
- Bryce Pressley, G/F, Portland
- Kyle Davis, F/C, BYU

Fourth Team

- Eric McClellan, G, Gonzaga
- Josh Perkins, G, Gonzaga
- Duda Sanadze, G, San Diego
- Brandon Brown, G/F, Loyola Marymount
- Matt Hubbard, F/C, Santa Clara

== Rankings ==
The AP Poll does not do post-season rankings. As a result, their last rankings are Week 19. The Coaches Poll does a post-season poll at the end of the NCAA Tournament.

Legend
	Improvement in ranking
	Drop in ranking
RV	Received votes but were not ranked in Top 25 of poll

		Pre/ Wk 1	Wk 2	Wk 3	Wk 4	Wk 5	Wk 6	Wk 7	Wk 8	Wk 9	Wk 10	Wk 11	Wk 12	Wk 13	Wk 14	Wk 15	Wk 16	Wk 17	Wk 18	Wk 19	Post
BYU	AP	RV	RV																		
BYU	C																				
Gonzaga	AP	9	10	10	13	20	RV	RV	RV	RV	25	RV			RV						
Gonzaga	C	11	12	11	12	17	21	24	24	22	22	RV	RV	RV	RV						
Loyola Marymount	AP																				
Loyola Marymount	C																				
Pacific	AP																				
Pacific	C																				
Pepperdine	AP																				
Pepperdine	C																				
Portland	AP																				
Portland	C																				
Saint Mary's	AP								RV	RV	RV	RV	RV	RV	RV						
Saint Mary's	C				RV	RV			RV	RV	RV	RV	RV	25	RV						
San Diego	AP																				
San Diego	C																				
San Francisco	AP																				
San Francisco	C																				
Santa Clara	AP																				
Santa Clara	C																				

== Non-conference games ==
- To be posted shortly.

== Conference games ==
=== Composite matrix ===
This table summarizes the head-to-head results between teams in conference play.

	BYU	Gonzaga	LMU	Pacific	Pepperdine	Portland	Saint Mary's	San Diego	San Francisco	Santa Clara
vs. Brigham Young	-	0-1	0-2	1-1	1–1	1–1	1-1	0-2	0–2	0–2
vs. Gonzaga	1-0	–	0–2	0–2	0–2	0–2	2–0	0–2	0–2	0–2
vs. Loyola Marymount	2–0	2–0	–	1-1	1–0	2-0	2–0	1-1	0-2	1–1
vs. Pacific	1–1	2–0	1-1	-	2–0	1-1	2–0	1-1	1–1	0–1
vs. Pepperdine	1–1	2–0	0–1	0–2	-	2-0	0-2	0-2	1–1	1-1
vs. Portland	1–1	2–0	0-2	1-1	0-2	-	2–0	1-0	2-0	2–0
vs. Saint Mary's	1-1	0–2	0–2	0–2	2-0	0–2	-	0–2	0–1	0–2
vs. San Diego	2-0	2–0	1-1	1-1	2-0	0-1	2–0	-	2–0	2–0
vs. San Francisco	2–0	2–0	2-0	0–2	1–1	0-2	1–0	0–2	-	0–2
vs. Santa Clara	2–0	2–0	1–1	1-0	1-1	0–2	2-0	0-2	2-0	-
Total	13–4	14–3	5–12	6–11	10–7	6–11	14–3	3–14	8–9	6–11

== Conference tournament ==
- March 4–8, 2016 - West Coast Conference Basketball Tournament, Orleans Arena, Paradise, Nevada.

== Bracket ==
First round Friday, March 4 BYUtv, TheW.tv
8	Loyola Marymount	64
9	San Diego	61

Quarterfinals; Saturday, March 5 TWC SportsNet, CSNCA, BYUtv, TheW.tv (afternoon); ESPN2 (evening)
1	Saint Mary's	60
8	Loyola Marymount	48
4	Pepperdine	90
5	San Francisco	86
2	Gonzaga	92
7	Portland	67
3	BYU	72
6	Santa Clara	60

Semifinals; Monday, March 7 ESPN (early); ESPN2 (late)
1	Saint Mary's
4	Pepperdine
2	Gonzaga
3	BYU

Championship; Tuesday, March 8 ESPN

- Pacific has placed themselves on a post-season probation and will not participate in the 2016 WCC Tournament.

== Head coaches ==
Dave Rose, BYU
Mark Few, Gonzaga
Mike Dunlap, Loyola Marymount
Ron Verlin, Pacific
Marty Wilson, Pepperdine
Eric Reveno, Portland
Randy Bennett, Saint Mary's
Lamont Smith, San Diego
Rex Walters, San Francisco
Kerry Keating, Santa Clara

== Postseason ==
=== NIT ===
Seed	Bracket	School	First round	Second round	Quarterfinals	Semifinals	Finals

=== CBI ===
School	First round	Quarterfinals	Semifinals	Finals game 1	Finals game 2	Finals game 3

== Awards and honors ==
=== WCC Player of the Week ===
The WCC Player of the Week awards are given each Monday.

- Nov. 16 - Kyle Davis, F, BYU
- Nov. 30 - Kyle Collinsworth, G, BYU & Kyle Wiltjer, F, Gonzaga
- Dec. 14 - Stacy Davis, F, Pepperdine
- Dec. 28 - Alec Wintering, G, Portland
- Jan. 11 - Kyle Collinsworth, G, BYU (2)
- Jan. 25 - Adom Jacko, F, Loyola Marymount
- Feb. 8 - Alec Wintering, G, Portland
- Feb. 22 -
- Nov. 23 - Domantas Sabonis, F, Gonzaga
- Dec. 7 - Nate Kratch, F, Santa Clara
- Dec. 21 - Domantas Sabonis, F, Gonzaga (2)
- Jan. 4 - Jared Brownridge, G, Santa Clara
- Jan. 18 - Jock Landale, C, Saint Mary's
- Feb. 1 - Kyle Wiltjer, F, Gonzaga (2)
- Feb. 15 - Nick Emery, G, BYU
- Feb. 29 -

=== College Madness West Coast Player of the Week ===
College Madness WCC player of the Week Awards are given every Sunday.

- Nov. 15 - Kyle Davis, F, BYU
- Nov. 29 - Jared Brownridge, G, Santa Clara
- Dec. 13 - Stacy Davis, F, Pepperdine
- Dec. 27 - Chase Fischer, G, BYU
- Jan. 10 - Nick Emery, G, BYU
- Jan. 24 - Evan Fitzner, C, Saint Mary's
- Feb. 7 - Alec Wintering, G, Portland (also High Major Player of the Week)
- Feb. 21 -
- Nov. 22 - Domantas Sabonis, F, Gonzaga
- Dec. 6 - Nate Kratch, F, Santa Clara
- Dec. 20 - Domantas Sabonis, F, Gonzaga
- Jan. 3 - Kyle Wiltjer, F, Gonzaga
- Jan. 17 - David Humphries, G, Loyola Marymount
- Jan. 31 - Kyle Wiltjer, F, Gonzaga
- Feb. 14 - Nick Emery, G, BYU (also High Major Player of the week)
- Feb. 28 -

=== National Player of the Week Awards ===
To be determined after the season begins.

=== Conference awards ===
The voting body for all conference awards is league coaches, with voting taking place at the end of the regular season.

==== Individual honors ====
- Player of the Year: Kyle Collinsworth, BYU
- Coach of the Year: Randy Bennett, Saint Mary's
- Defensive Player of the Year: Eric McClellan, Gonzaga
- Newcomer of the Year: Joe Rahon, Saint Mary's

==== First-Team All-Conference ====
Player	School	Year	Position
Jared Brownridge	Santa Clara	Junior	G
Kyle Collinsworth	BYU	Senior	G
Stacy Davis	Pepperdine	Senior	F
Chase Fischer	BYU	Senior	G
Emmett Naar	Saint Mary's	Sophomore	G
Joe Rahon	Saint Mary's	Junior	G
Domantas Sabonis	Gonzaga	Sophomore	F
Devin Watson	San Francisco	Sophomore	G
Kyle Wiltjer	Gonzaga	Senior	F
Alec Winterling	Portland	Junior	G

==== Second-Team All-Conference ====
Player	School	Year	Position
Tim Derksen	San Francisco	Senior	G
Nick Emery	BYU	Freshman	G
Adom Jacko	Pepperdine	Junior	F
Lamond Murray Jr.	Pepperdine	Junior	G/F
Bryce Pressley	Portland	Senior	G

==== Honorable Mention ====
Name	School
Brandon Brown	Loyola Marymount
Alec Kobre	Pacific
Jett Raines	Pepperdine
T. J. Wallace	Pacific

=== All-Freshman ===
Player	School	Position
Kameron Edwards	Pepperdine	F
Nick Emery	BYU	G
KJ Feagin	Santa Clara	G
Evan Fitzner	Saint Mary's	C
Josh Perkins	Gonzaga	G

== See also ==
- 2015-16 NCAA Division I men's basketball season
- West Coast Conference men's basketball tournament
- 2015–16 West Coast Conference women's basketball season
- West Coast Conference women's basketball tournament
- 2016 West Coast Conference women's basketball tournament
