= 2015–16 Gonzaga Bulldogs men's basketball team =

American college basketball season

2015–16 Gonzaga Bulldogs men's basketball

WCC regular season co–champions WCC tournament champions

NCAA tournament, Sweet Sixteen
- Conference: West Coast Conference

Ranking
- Coaches: No. 21
- Record: 28–8 (15–3 WCC)
- Head coach: Mark Few (17th season)
- Assistant coaches: Tommy Lloyd (15th season); Donny Daniels (6th season); Brian Michaelson (3rd season)
- Home arena: McCarthey Athletic Center

2015–16 West Coast Conference men's basketball standings
	Conf.				Overall
Team	W		L	PCT	W		L	PCT
Saint Mary's	15	–	3	.833	29	–	6	.829
Gonzaga †	15	–	3	.833	28	–	8	.778
BYU	13	–	5	.722	26	–	11	.703
Pepperdine	10	–	8	.556	18	–	14	.563
San Francisco	8	–	10	.444	15	–	15	.500
Santa Clara	7	–	11	.389	11	–	20	.355
Portland	6	–	12	.333	12	–	20	.375
Loyola Marymount	6	–	12	.333	14	–	17	.452
Pacific*	6	–	12	.333	8	–	20	.286
San Diego	4	–	14	.222	9	–	21	.300
† Conference tournament winner *ineligible for postseason due to self probation

The 2015–16 Gonzaga Bulldogs men's basketball team represented Gonzaga University in the 2015–16 NCAA Division I men's basketball season. The team was led by head coach Mark Few, who was in his 17th season as head coach. The team played its home games at McCarthey Athletic Center, which had a capacity of 6,000. The Bulldogs (also informally referred to as the Zags) played in their 36th season as a member of the West Coast Conference. They finished the season 28–8, 15–3 in WCC play to finish in a share for the WCC regular season championship. They defeated Portland, BYU, and Saint Mary's to be champions of the WCC tournament and earn the conference's automatic bid to the NCAA tournament. As a #11 seed, they defeated Seton Hall and Utah to advance to the Sweet Sixteen, where they lost to Syracuse. The final AP Poll is the most recent poll in which Gonzaga was unranked until 2023–24, when they were unranked for six weeks.

== Previous season ==
The 2014–15 Gonzaga Bulldogs team were predicted to finish atop of the conference by the West Coast Conference Preseason Poll. The Zags finished in first place in the West Coast Conference Standings for the 18th time with a 17–1 conference record after BYU defeated the Zags in the regular season finale, snapping the nation's longest active home winning streak of 41 games, as well as Gonzaga's school record 22-game winning streak. The Bulldogs then went on to beat BYU in the West Coast Conference tournament, and claimed their 14th WCC tournament title, along with punching their 18th ticket to the NCAA tournament. Gonzaga entered the 2015 NCAA tournament as a #2 seed in the South region, and dismantled #15 seed North Dakota State, #7 seed Iowa, and #11 seed UCLA, to gain its second trip to the Elite Eight, as well as Mark Few's first as head coach. The Zags then fell to #1 seed (and eventual national champion) Duke, and finished the season with a 35–3 record, which were the most wins in school history.

== Offseason ==
=== Coaching changes ===
==== Additions to staff ====
Name	Position	Year at Gonzaga	Alma mater (year)	Previous job
Doug Wojcik	Special assistant to the head coach	1st	Navy (1987)	Head coach at College of Charleston

=== Player departures ===
Name	Number	Pos.	Height	Weight	Year	Hometown	Reason for departure
Gary Bell Jr.	5	G	6'2"	212	Senior	Kent, WA	Graduated
Kevin Pangos	4	G	6'2"	182	Senior	Newmarket, ON	Graduated
Byron Wesley	22	G	6'4"	206	Senior	Rancho Cucamonga, CA	Graduated
Angel Nunez	2	F	6'8"	202	Junior (redshirt)	Bronx, NY	Transferred to South Florida
Connor Griffin	14	G	6'4"	214	Sophomore	Lake Oswego, OR	Transferred to Washington (football)

=== Incoming transfers ===
Name	Pos.	Height	Weight	Year	Hometown	Previous school	Years remaining	Date eligible
Nigel Williams-Goss	G	6'3"	190	Junior	Happy Valley, OR	Washington	2	Oct. 1, 2016
Johnathan Williams	F	6'9"	228	Junior	Memphis, TN	Missouri	2	Oct. 1, 2016
Jeremy Jones	F	6'6"	203	Sophomore	San Antonio, TX	Rice	3	Oct. 1, 2016

=== 2015 recruiting class ===
College recruiting
Name	Hometown	School	Height	Weight	Commit date
Jesse Wade; PG	Kaysville, UT	Davis	6 ft 1 in (1.85 m)	165 lb (75 kg)	Oct 4, 2013
Jesse Wade; PG	Recruit ratings: Scout: Rivals: 247Sports: ESPN: (80)				
Jack Beach; SG	San Diego, CA	Torrey Pines	6 ft 2 in (1.88 m)	160 lb (73 kg)	Jan 1, 2015
Jack Beach; SG	Recruit ratings: Scout: Rivals: 247Sports: ESPN: (N/A)				
Overall recruit ranking: Scout: N/A Rivals: N/A 247Sports: #110 ESPN: N/A
Note: In many cases, Scout, Rivals, 247Sports, On3, and ESPN may conflict in their listings of height and weight.; In these cases, the average was taken. ESPN grades are on a 100-point scale.; Sources: "2015 Gonzaga Rivals Commits". Rivals.; "2015 Gonzaga Scout Commits". Scout.; "2015 Gonzaga ESPN Commits". ESPN.; "Scout.com Team Recruiting Rankings". Scout.; "2015 Team Ranking". Rivals.; "2015 Gonzaga 24/7 Sports Commits". 247Sports.

=== 2016 recruiting class ===
College recruiting (2016)
Name	Hometown	School	Height	Weight	Commit date
Zach Collins; C	Las Vegas, NV	Bishop Gorman	7 ft 0 in (2.13 m)	230 lb (100 kg)	Mar 16, 2015
Zach Collins; C	Recruit ratings: Scout: Rivals: 247Sports: ESPN: (88)				
Killian Tillie; F	Antibes, France	INSEP	6 ft 10 in (2.08 m)	230 lb (100 kg)	Aug 29, 2015
Killian Tillie; F	Recruit ratings: Scout: Rivals: 247Sports: ESPN: (NR)				
Zach Norvell Jr. G	Chicago, IL	Simeon	6 ft 6 in (1.98 m)	185 lb (84 kg)	Nov 2, 2015
Zach Norvell Jr. G	Recruit ratings: Scout: Rivals: 247Sports: ESPN: (82)				
Jacob Larsen; C	Holte, Denmark	Falkonergårdens Gymnasium; SISU Copenhagen	6 ft 10 in (2.08 m)	235 lb (107 kg)	Nov 12, 2015
Jacob Larsen; C	Recruit ratings: Scout: Rivals: 247Sports: ESPN: (NR)				
Rui Hachimura; F	Sendai, Japan	Meisei	6 ft 8 in (2.03 m)	210 lb (95 kg)	Nov 20, 2015
Rui Hachimura; F	Recruit ratings: Scout: Rivals: 247Sports: ESPN: (NR)				
Overall recruit ranking: Scout: #14 Rivals: #13 247Sports: #10 ESPN: #21
Note: In many cases, Scout, Rivals, 247Sports, On3, and ESPN may conflict in their listings of height and weight.; In these cases, the average was taken. ESPN grades are on a 100-point scale.; Sources: "2016 Gonzaga Rivals Commits". Rivals. Archived from the original on May 8, 2013.; "2016 Gonzaga Scout Commits". Scout. Archived from the original on May 8, 2013.; "2016 Gonzaga ESPN Commits". ESPN. Archived from the original on May 8, 2013.; "Scout.com Team Recruiting Rankings". Scout.; "2016 Team Ranking". Rivals.; "2016 Gonzaga 24/7 Sports Commits". 247Sports. Archived from the original on May 8, 2013.

== Roster ==
2015–16 Gonzaga Bulldogs men's basketball team
Players
Coaches

Pos.	#	Name	Height	Weight	Year	Previous school	Hometown
G	23	Eric McClellan	6 ft 4 in (1.93 m)	196 lb (89 kg)	RS Sr	Austin; Vanderbilt; Tulsa	Austin, TX
F	33	Kyle Wiltjer	6 ft 10 in (2.08 m)	240 lb (109 kg)	RS Sr	Jesuit; Kentucky	Portland, OR
G	3	Kyle Dranginis	6 ft 5 in (1.96 m)	203 lb (92 kg)	RS Sr	Skyview	Nampa, ID
C	24	Przemek Karnowski (injured) (redshirt)	7 ft 1 in (2.16 m)	287 lb (130 kg)	Sr	Nicolaus Copernicus; Siarka Jezioro Tarnobrzeg	Toruń, Poland
G	15	Rem Bakamus (W)	6 ft 0 in (1.83 m)	167 lb (76 kg)	RS Jr	Mark Morris	Longview, WA
G	5	Nigel Williams-Goss (I) (redshirt)	6 ft 3 in (1.91 m)	190 lb (86 kg)	Jr	Findlay Prep; Washington	Happy Valley, OR
F	14	Johnathan Williams (I) (redshirt)	6 ft 9 in (2.06 m)	228 lb (103 kg)	Jr	Southwind; Missouri	Memphis, TN
C	25	Ryan Edwards	7 ft 1 in (2.16 m)	290 lb (132 kg)	RS So	Glacier	Kalispell, MT
G	55	Dustin Triano (W)	6 ft 3 in (1.91 m)	178 lb (81 kg)	RS So	New Hampton School	Vancouver, BC
G	0	Silas Melson	6 ft 4 in (1.93 m)	186 lb (84 kg)	So	Jefferson	Portland, OR
F	11	Domantas Sabonis	6 ft 11 in (2.11 m)	240 lb (109 kg)	So	Sunny View School; Unicaja Málaga	Kaunas, Lithuania
F	22	Jeremy Jones (I, W) (redshirt)	6 ft 6 in (1.98 m)	203 lb (92 kg)	So	East Central; Rice	San Antonio, TX
G	13	Josh Perkins	6 ft 3 in (1.91 m)	185 lb (84 kg)	RS Fr	Huntington Prep	Park Hill, CO
G	10	Bryan Alberts	6 ft 5 in (1.96 m)	198 lb (90 kg)	RS Fr	Village Christian	Northridge, CA
G	2	Jack Beach (W)	6 ft 2 in (1.88 m)	160 lb (73 kg)	Fr	Torrey Pines	San Diego, CA

Head coach

- Mark Few (Oregon)

Assistant coach(es)

- Tommy Lloyd (Whitman)
- Donny Daniels (Cal State Fullerton)
- Brian Michaelson (Gonzaga)

Legend

- (C) Team captain
- (S) Suspended
- (I) Ineligible
- (W) Walk-on
- Injured
- Current redshirt

Roster
Last update: September 30, 2015

- Roster is subject to change as/if players transfer or leave the program for other reasons.
- Josh Perkins suffered a broken jaw in a November 2014 game and wasn't cleared to play with full contact until late April 2015. He was granted a medical hardship waiver and will have 4 years of eligibility remaining effective at the start of the 2015–16 season.
- Jesse Wade graduated high school in 2015, but before enrolling in college at Gonzaga, he left for a 2-year LDS mission in Lyon, France, and will arrive on campus as a freshman in Fall 2017.
- Przemek Karnowski did not play after the Bulldogs' fifth game of the season, a November 27, 2015 win over UConn, due to back problems. On December 31, it was announced that he would undergo surgery and miss the rest of the season. At the time his surgery was announced, it had not been decided whether Karnowski would apply for a medical hardship waiver and play at Gonzaga in 2016–17, or turn professional after this season. He ultimately chose to remain at Gonzaga and play in the 2016–17 season.

=== Coaching staff ===
Name	Position	Year at Gonzaga	Alma mater (year)
Mark Few	Head coach	17th	Oregon (1987)
Tommy Lloyd	Associate head coach	15th	Whitman (1998)
Donny Daniels	Assistant coach	6th	Cal State Fullerton (1976)
Brian Michaelson	Assistant coach	3rd	Gonzaga (2005)
Doug Wojcik	Special assistant to the head coach	1st	Navy (1987)
John Jakus	Director of basketball operations	2nd	Trinity International (1999)
Mike Hart	Video coordinator	2nd	Gonzaga (2012)
Riccardo Fois	Director of Analytics	2nd	Pepperdine (2009)
Jennifer Nyland	Athletic trainer	17th	Washington State (1998)
Travis Knight	Strength & conditioning coach	10th	Gonzaga (2000)

== Rankings ==
Ranking movement Legend: ██ Increase in ranking. ██ Decrease in ranking. RV=Others receiving votes. *AP does not release post-NCAA tournament rankings.
Poll	Pre	Wk 2	Wk 3	Wk 4	Wk 5	Wk 6	Wk 7	Wk 8	Wk 9	Wk 10	Wk 11	Wk 12	Wk 13	Wk 14	Wk 15	Wk 16	Wk 17	Wk 18	Wk 19	Final
AP	9	10	10	13	20	RV	RV	RV	RV	25	RV			RV				RV	RV	N/A*
Coaches	11	12	11	12	17	21	24	24	22	21	RV	RV	RV	RV	RV				RV	21

== Schedule ==
Gonzaga's non-conference schedule included home games against Arizona, UCLA, Montana, Northern Arizona, Mount St. Mary's, and Saint Martin's. Gonzaga played true road games at SMU and Washington State, and also faced off with Pittsburgh in the Armed Forces Classic in Okinawa, Japan. The Zags were invited to play in the Battle 4 Atlantis, where they played against three of the following in the Bahamas: Syracuse, UConn, Texas, Michigan, Texas A&M, Washington, and Charlotte. Gonzaga also played Tennessee in the 13th annual Battle in Seattle at KeyArena. Gonzaga played 18 conference games (home-and-home) during the season. Gonzaga was featured on the ESPN networks at least 14 times in 2015–16. The WCC Tournament featured five games televised on the ESPN networks.

Date time, TV	Rank^{#}	Opponent^{#}	Result	Record	High points	High rebounds	High assists	Site (attendance) city, state
Exhibition
Oct 31*	No. 9	vs. No. 22 Baylor; Secret Scrimmage	L –	–	–	–	–	Zions Bank Basketball Center; Salt Lake City, UT
Nov 7*; 5:00 pm, KHQ	No. 9	Eastern Oregon	W 90–58	–	33 – Wiltjer	14 – Wiltjer	5 – Perkins	McCarthey Athletic Center (6,000); Spokane, WA
Regular season
Nov 13*; 4:00 pm, ESPN	No. 9	vs. Pittsburgh; Armed Forces Classic	Cancelled (Note: The referees cancelled the game at halftime due to dangerous court conditions. The game did not count toward either team's win–loss record, and player statistics from the game were not counted as official. Pittsburgh was leading 37–35.)					Butler Marine Base; Okinawa, JP
Nov 18*; 6:00 pm, KHQ/RTNW	No. 10	Northern Arizona	W 91–52	1–0	26 – Sabonis	9 – Karnowski	6 – Perkins	McCarthey Athletic Center (6,000); Spokane, WA
Nov 21*; 6:00 pm, KHQ/RTNW	No. 10	Mount St. Mary's; Battle 4 Atlantis opening round	W 101–56	2–0	15 – Melson, Sabonis	14 – Sabonis	5 – Dranginis	McCarthey Athletic Center (6,000); Spokane, WA
Nov 25*; 9:00 am, ESPN2	No. 10	vs. Washington; Battle 4 Atlantis quarterfinals	W 80–64	3–0	24 – Wiltjer	11 – Dranginis, Wiltjer	3 – McClellan	Imperial Arena (1,374); Nassau, BS
Nov 26*; 10:00 am, ESPN	No. 10	vs. No. 25 Texas A&M; Battle 4 Atlantis semifinals	L 61–62	3–1	18 – Wiltjer	7 – Wiltjer	5 – Dranginis	Imperial Arena (1,331); Nassau, BS
Nov 27*; 9:00 am, ESPN	No. 10	vs. No. 18 UConn; Battle 4 Atlantis third-place game	W 73–70	4–1	17 – Wiltjer	9 – Sabonis	5 – Dranginis	Imperial Arena (2,122); Nassau, BS
Dec 2*; 8:00 pm, FS1	No. 13	at Washington State	W 69–60	5–1	22 – Wiltjer	14 – Sabonis	4 – Dranginis	Beasley Coliseum (8,209); Pullman, WA
Dec 5*; 12:15 pm, ESPN	No. 13	No. 19 Arizona	L 63–68	5–2	33 – Wiltjer	16 – Sabonis	5 – Perkins	McCarthey Athletic Center (6,000); Spokane, WA
Dec 8*; 6:00 pm, KHQ/RTNW	No. 20	Montana	W 61–58	6–2	16 – Sabonis, Wiltjer	10 – Sabonis	3 – Perkins	McCarthey Athletic Center (6,000); Spokane, WA
Dec 12*; 7:00 pm, ESPN2	No. 20	UCLA	L 66–71	6–3	20 – Wiltjer	8 – Sabonis, Wiltjer	4 – Dranginis	McCarthey Athletic Center (6,000); Spokane, WA
Dec 14*; 6:00 pm, KHQ/RTNW		Saint Martin's	W 86–50	7–3	21 – Sabonis	12 – Sabonis	8 – Perkins	McCarthey Athletic Center (6,000); Spokane, WA
Dec 19*; 8:00 pm, ESPNU		vs. Tennessee; Battle in Seattle	W 86–79	8–3	36 – Sabonis	16 – Sabonis	3 – Dranginis	KeyArena (16,770); Seattle, WA
WCC regular season
Dec 21; 6:00 pm, ESPN2		Pepperdine	W 99–73	9–3 (1–0)	23 – Sabonis	11 – Wiltjer	6 – Sabonis	McCarthey Athletic Center (6,000); Spokane, WA
Dec 23; 6:00 pm, KHQ/RTNW		Loyola Marymount	W 85–62	10–3 (2–0)	26 – Wiltjer	13 – Sabonis	7 – Dranginis	McCarthey Athletic Center (6,000); Spokane, WA
Dec 31; 2:00 pm, KHQ/RTNW		at Santa Clara	W 79–77	11–3 (3–0)	26 – Perkins	7 – Wiltjer	4 – Perkins	Leavey Center (3,121); Santa Clara, CA
Jan 2; 8:00 pm, ESPN2		at San Francisco	W 102–94 ^{OT}	12–3 (4–0)	35 – Sabonis	14 – Sabonis	4 – Sabonis	War Memorial Gymnasium (3,253); San Francisco, CA
Jan 9; 5:00 pm, KHQ/RTNW		Portland	W 85–74	13–3 (5–0)	32 – Wiltjer	17 – Sabonis	7 – Perkins	McCarthey Athletic Center (6,000); Spokane, WA
Jan 14; 6:00 pm, ESPN2	No. 25	BYU; Rivalry	L 68–69	13–4 (5–1)	35 – Wiltjer	10 – Wiltjer	7 – Perkins	McCarthey Athletic Center (6,000); Spokane, WA
Jan 16; 5:00 pm, KAYU/RTNW	No. 25	San Diego	W 88–52	14–4 (6–1)	25 – Wiltjer	15 – Sabonis	5 – Perkins	McCarthey Athletic Center (6,000); Spokane, WA
Jan 21; 8:00 pm, ESPNU		at Saint Mary's; Rivalry	L 67–70	14–5 (6–2)	23 – McClellan	13 – Sabonis	7 – Sabonis	McKeon Pavilion (3,500); Moraga, CA
Jan 23; 1:00 pm, KHQ/RTNW/TWCSN		at Pacific	W 71–61	15–5 (7–2)	23 – Wiltjer	20 – Sabonis	5 – Dranginis	Alex G. Spanos Center (4,309); Stockton, CA
Jan 28; 6:00 pm, KHQ/RTNW		Santa Clara	W 84–67	16–5 (8–2)	35 – Wilter	17 – Sabonis	4 – McClellan	McCarthey Athletic Center (6,000); Spokane, WA
Jan 30; 5:00 pm, KHQ/RTNW		San Francisco	W 86–48	17–5 (9–2)	15 – Melson, Sabonis, Wiltjer	10 – Dranginis	5 – Perkins	McCarthey Athletic Center (6,000); Spokane, WA
Feb 4; 7:00 pm, KHQ/RTNW		at Loyola Marymount	W 92–63	18–5 (10–2)	23 – Wiltjer	11 – Sabonis	7 – Dranginis	Gersten Pavilion (3,422); Los Angeles, CA
Feb 6; 9:00 pm, ESPN2		at Pepperdine	W 69–66	19–5 (11–2)	20 – Sabonis	11 – Sabonis	5 – Dranginis, Perkins	Firestone Fieldhouse (3,210); Malibu, CA
Feb 11; 8:00 pm, ESPNU		at Portland	W 92–66	20–5 (12–2)	21 – Wiltjer	11 – Sabonis	9 – Perkins	Chiles Center (4,852); Portland, OR
Feb 13*; 7:00 pm, ESPN2		at No. 16 SMU	L 60–69	20–6	20 – Sabonis	16 – Sabonis	7 – Perkins	Moody Coliseum (7,249); Dallas, TX
Feb 18; 6:00 pm, KHQ/RTNW		Pacific	W 90–68	21–6 (13–2)	26 – Wiltjer	10 – Sabonis	6 – Perkins	McCarthey Athletic Center (6,000); Spokane, WA
Feb 20; 7:00 pm, ESPN2		Saint Mary's; Rivalry	L 58–63	21–7 (13–3)	21 – Perkins	13 – Sabonis	3 – McClellan	McCarthey Athletic Center (6,000); Spokane, WA
Feb 25; 7:00 pm, KHQ/RTNW		at San Diego	W 82–60	22–7 (14–3)	18 – Melson	17 – Sabonis	3 – Dranginis, McClellan	Jenny Craig Pavilion (4,076); San Diego, CA
Feb 27; 5:00 pm, ESPN2		at BYU; Rivalry	W 71–68	23–7 (15–3)	21 – Wiltjer	14 – Sabonis	5 – Perkins	Marriott Center (18,987); Provo, UT
WCC Tournament
Mar 5; 9:00 pm, ESPN2	(2)	vs. (7) Portland; Quarterfinals	W 92–67	24–7	26 – McClellan	8 – Dranginis, Wiltjer	5 – Dranginis	Orleans Arena (7,209); Las Vegas, NV
Mar 7; 8:30 pm, ESPN2	(2)	vs. (3) BYU; Semifinals/Rivalry	W 88–84	25–7	29 – Wiltjer	14 – Sabonis	5 – Perkins	Orleans Arena (8,362); Las Vegas, NV
Mar 8; 6:00 pm, ESPN	(2)	vs. (1) Saint Mary's; Championship/Rivalry	W 85–75	26–7	20 – McClellan	8 – Sabonis	5 – Perkins	Orleans Arena (7,418); Las Vegas, NV
NCAA tournament
Mar 17*; 6:57 pm, truTV	(11 MW)	vs. (6 MW) No. 20 Seton Hall; First Round	W 68–52	27–7	21 – Sabonis	16 – Sabonis	7 – Perkins	Pepsi Center (19,500); Denver, CO
Mar 19*; 5:40 pm, TNT	(11 MW)	vs. (3 MW) No. 13 Utah; Second Round	W 82–59	28–7	22 – McClellan	10 – Sabonis	3 – Dranginis, McClellan, Sabonis, Wiltjer	Pepsi Center (19,551); Denver, CO
Mar 25*; 6:40 pm, CBS	(11 MW)	vs. (10 MW) Syracuse; Sweet Sixteen	L 60–63	28–8	23 – Wiltjer	17 – Sabonis	6 – Perkins	United Center (21,490); Chicago, IL
*Non-conference game. ^{#}Rankings from AP Poll. (#) Tournament seedings in parentheses. MW=Midwest Region. All times are in Pacific Time.

== See also ==
- 2015–16 Gonzaga Bulldogs women's basketball team
- 2015–16 West Coast Conference men's basketball season
