= Mike Burns (basketball) =

American assistant men's college basketball coach

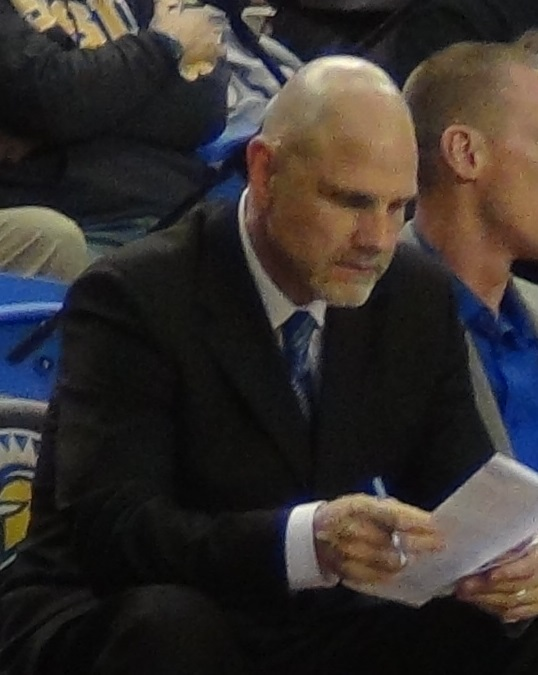
- Burns in 2017.

Current position
- Title: Assistant coach
- Team: Boise State
- Conference: Mountain West

Biographical details
- Born: May 14, 1962 (age 64); Tacoma, Washington, U.S.
- Education: Central Washington University

Coaching career (HC unless noted)
- 1992–1995: Highline CC (asst.)
- 1995–1996: Tyee HS
- 1996–1999: Central Washington (asst.)
- 1999–2000: Stephen F. Austin (asst.)
- 2000–2003: Eastern Washington (asst.)
- 2003–2004: Washington State (asst.)
- 2004–2007: Eastern Washington
- 2007–2008: CC of Spokane
- 2008–2015: San Diego (asst.)
- 2015–2016: Pacific (asst., interim HC)
- 2016–present: Boise State (asst.)

Head coaching record
- Overall: 45–62 (.421)

Michael Edward Burns (born May 14, 1962) is an American assistant men's college basketball coach at Boise State.

== Early life and education ==
Born in Tacoma, Washington, Burns graduated from Tyee High School in SeaTac in 1980. Burns first attended Idaho State University after high school. He later returned to the Seattle area to work as a concert promoter and worked with several grunge bands.

== Coaching career ==
Burns became an assistant coach at Highline College, a junior college in Des Moines, Washington. After three years at Highline, Burns returned to Tyee High School as co-head coach for the 1995–96 season. From 1996 to 1999, Burns worked as an assistant coach at Central Washington University.

Burns was an assistant at Stephen F. Austin State University in the 1999–2000 season before returning to Washington state as an assistant coach for Eastern Washington under Ray Giacoletti in 2000. Burns became associate head coach in 2002. In 2003, Burns was an assistant coach at Washington State under Dick Bennett.

Burns returned to Eastern Washington in 2004 as head coach. For 2007–2008, Burns was head coach at Community Colleges of Spokane, leading the team to a 30–2 record and year-long #1 ranking in the Northwest Athletic Association of Community Colleges league. His team had a 24-game winning streak snapped with a one-point loss in the title game against Yakima Valley CC. He was named the NWAACC Coach of the Year, and the NWAACC East Region Coach of the Year.

In 2008, Burns left and was an assistant coach at University of San Diego under Bill Grier. In June 2015, Burns was an assistant coach at the University of the Pacific under Ron Verlin. Burns took over as interim head coach on December 11, 2015.

On May 25, 2016, Burns joined Leon Rice's staff at Boise State as an assistant coach.

== Head coaching record ==
Record table
Season	Team	Overall	Conference	Standing	Postseason
Eastern Washington Eagles (Big Sky Conference) (2004–2007)
2004–05	Eastern Washington	8–20	5–9	6th	
2005–06	Eastern Washington	15–15	6–5	3rd	
2006–07	Eastern Washington	15–14	8–8	T–5th	
Eastern Washington:		38–49 (.437)	22–22 (.500)		
Pacific Tigers (West Coast Conference) (2015–2016)
2015–16	Pacific	7–13	6–12	7th	
Pacific:		7–13 (.350)	6–12 (.333)		
Total:		45–62 (.421)			
