= 2015–16 Pacific Tigers men's basketball team =

American college basketball season

2015–16 Pacific Tigers men's basketball
- Conference: West Coast Conference
- Record: 8–20 (6–12 WCC)
- Head coach: Mike Burns interim (1st season)
- Assistant coaches: Calvin Byrd (10th season); Dwight Young (3rd season)
- Home arena: Alex G. Spanos Center

2015–16 West Coast Conference men's basketball standings
	Conf.				Overall
Team	W		L	PCT	W		L	PCT
Saint Mary's	15	–	3	.833	29	–	6	.829
Gonzaga †	15	–	3	.833	28	–	8	.778
BYU	13	–	5	.722	26	–	11	.703
Pepperdine	10	–	8	.556	18	–	14	.563
San Francisco	8	–	10	.444	15	–	15	.500
Santa Clara	7	–	11	.389	11	–	20	.355
Portland	6	–	12	.333	12	–	20	.375
Loyola Marymount	6	–	12	.333	14	–	17	.452
Pacific*	6	–	12	.333	8	–	20	.286
San Diego	4	–	14	.222	9	–	21	.300
† Conference tournament winner *ineligible for postseason due to self probation

The 2015–16 Pacific Tigers men's basketball team represented the University of the Pacific during the 2015–16 NCAA Division I men's basketball season. They played their home games at the Alex G. Spanos Center and were members of the West Coast Conference. The Tigers were led by third-year head coach Ron Verlin. On December 12, 2015, Verlin was suspended indefinitely amid an NCAA investigation. Assistant coach Mike Burns was named the interim head coach for the remainder of the season. The Tigers also self-imposed a postseason ban for 2016 which included the WCC Tournament. They finished the season 8–20, 6–12 in WCC play to finish in a three-way tie for seventh place

On March 3, 2016, it was announced that Ron Verlin was no longer employed by the university. Interim coach Mike Burns was also released from his employment with the school.

On March 16, the school announced that Damon Stoudamire would be the new head coach.

== Previous season ==
The Tigers finished the 2014–15 season 12–19, 4–14 in WCC play to finish in a tie for ninth place. They lost in the first round of the WCC tournament to San Francisco.

== Departures ==
Name	Number	Pos.	Height	Weight	Year	Hometown	Notes
Aaron Hendricks	4	G	6'0"	185	RS Sophomore	Loomis, CA	Walk-on; left the team
Dulani Robinson	5	G	5'9"	165	Junior	Oakland, CA	Transferred to Texas Southern
Cole Currie	10	G	6'2"	165	Sophomore	La Crescenta, CA	Left the team due to personal resasons
Gabriel Aguirre	11	F	6'10"	250	Senior	São Paulo, Brazil	Graduated
Kaleb Warner	25	F	6'6"	190	Freshman	Seattle, WA	Transferred to North Idaho College
Thomas Peters	30	F	6'6"	200	RS Sophomore	Campbell, CA	Walk on; didn't return

=== Incoming transfers ===
Name	Number	Pos.	Height	Weight	Year	Hometown	Previous School
Maleke Haynes	0	G	5"11"	160	Sophomore	Woodland Hills, CA	Junior college transferred from Saddleback College
Tonko Vuko	4	F	6'8"	228	Junior	Split, Croatia	Junior college transferred from Weatherford College
Jack Williams	11	F	6'8"	195	Sophomore	Valencia, CA	Transferred from Long Beach State. Under NCAA transfer rules, Williams will have to sit out for the 2015–16 season. Will have three years of remaining eligibility.

== Recruiting Class of 2015 ==
College recruiting information
Name	Hometown	School	Height	Weight	Commit date
Anthony Townes; F	Modesto, California	Modesto Christian	6 ft 5 in (1.96 m)	205 lb (93 kg)	Jan 7, 2014
Anthony Townes; F	Recruit ratings: Scout: Rivals: (63)				
Overall recruit ranking: Scout: 98 Rivals: nr ESPN: nr
Note: In many cases, Scout, Rivals, 247Sports, On3, and ESPN may conflict in their listings of height and weight.; In these cases, the average was taken. ESPN grades are on a 100-point scale.; Sources: "Pacific 2015 Basketball Commitments". Rivals.; "2015 Pacific Basketball Commits". Scout.; "ESPN". ESPN.; "Scout.com Team Recruiting Rankings". Scout.; "2015 Team Ranking". Rivals.

== Allegations of academic fraud ==
On December 12, 2015 head coach Ron Verlin and assistant Dwight Young were suspended by the University after allegations of academic fraud came to light involving the two. Assistant coach Mike Burns was given the interim title. As a result of these allegations, the University placed a self-imposed postseason ban and also put on some scholarship restrictions.

== Roster ==
2015–16 Pacific Tigers men's basketball team
Players
Coaches

Pos.	#	Name	Height	Weight	Year	Previous school	Hometown
G	0	Maleke Haynes	5 ft 10 in (1.78 m)	160 lb (73 kg)	So	El Camino Real; Saddleback College	Reseda, CA
G	2	T. J. Wallace	6 ft 3 in (1.91 m)	215 lb (98 kg)	Jr	Modesto Christian	Stockton, CA
G	3	Alec Kobre	6 ft 2 in (1.88 m)	185 lb (84 kg)	Sr	Montgomery; Santa Rosa JC	Santa Rosa, CA
F	4	Tonko Vuko	6 ft 8 in (2.03 m)	230 lb (104 kg)	Jr	Jezicna Gimnazija Split; Weatherford College	Split, Croatia
F	5	Anthony Townes	6 ft 6 in (1.98 m)	215 lb (98 kg)	Fr	Modesto Christian	Modesto, CA
G	10	Rolaun Dunham (W)	6 ft 1 in (1.85 m)	170 lb (77 kg)	RS So	Riverbank	Riverbank, CA
F	11	Jack Williams (I) (redshirt)	6 ft 8 in (2.03 m)	220 lb (100 kg)	So	Chaminade; Long Beach State	Porter Ranch, CA
F	12	Eric Thompson	6 ft 8 in (2.03 m)	240 lb (109 kg)	Sr	Clawson; Saddleback College	Detroit, MI
G	14	Max Tinsley (W)	6 ft 2 in (1.88 m)	170 lb (77 kg)	Fr	Chaminade Prep	Porter Ranch, CA
G	15	D. J. Ursery	6 ft 4 in (1.93 m)	195 lb (88 kg)	So	Crespi Carmelite	Los Angeles, CA
F	21	Jacob Lampkin	6 ft 9 in (2.06 m)	235 lb (107 kg)	So	O'Dea	Bellevue, WA
G	22	Ray Bowles	6 ft 5 in (1.96 m)	215 lb (98 kg)	RS So	Modesto Christian	Modesto, CA
F	24	David Taylor	6 ft 3 in (1.91 m)	190 lb (86 kg)	Jr	Graf-Münster-Gymnasium	Eclersdorf, Germany
F	33	Ilias Theodorou	6 ft 7 in (2.01 m)	215 lb (98 kg)	So	St. John's NW Military Acad.	Athens, Greece
C	35	Sami Eleraky	7 ft 0 in (2.13 m)	260 lb (118 kg)	Jr	Tech College Aalborg; City College of San Francisco	Aalborg, Denmark

Head coach

- Ron Verlin (Sacramento State)

Assistant coach(es)

- Mike Burns (Central Washington)
- Calvin Byrd (Villanova)
- Dwight Young (Oregon State)

Legend

- (C) Team captain
- (S) Suspended
- (I) Ineligible
- (W) Walk-on
- Injured
- Current redshirt

Roster

== Schedule and results ==
Date time, TV	Opponent	Result	Record	Site (attendance) city, state
Exhibition
11/07/2015*; 7:30 pm	Caroll (MT)	W 79–72		Alex G. Spanos Center (2,598); Stockton, CA
Regular season
11/13/2015*; 6:30 pm, P12N	at No. 12 Arizona	L 61–79	0–1	McKale Center (14,644); Tucson, AZ
11/17/2015*; 7:00 pm, TheW.tv	Cal State Fullerton	L 76–77	0–2	Alex G. Spanos Center (1,913); Stockton, CA
11/21/2015*; 7:00 pm, TheW.tv	Nevada	L 82–85 ^{2OT}	0–3	Alex G. Spanos Center (2,169); Stockton, CA
11/23/2015*; 7:00 pm, TheW.tv	Notre Dame de Namur	W 79–44	1–3	Alex G. Spanos Center (1,620); Stockton, CA
11/28/2015*; 6:30 pm	vs. Eastern Washington; Sacramento State Tournament	L 63–70	1–4	Colberg Court (551); Sacramento, CA
11/29/2015*; 5:35 pm	at Sacramento State; Sacramento State Tournament	L 71–79	1–5	Colberg Court (827); Sacramento, CA
12/04/2015*; 7:00 pm, TheW.tv	UC Irvine	L 67–70	1–6	Alex G. Spanos Center (2,111); Stockton, CA
12/12/2015*; 4:00 pm, MW Net	at Fresno State	L 52–71	1–7	Save Mart Center (5,434); Fresno, CA
12/15/2015*; 5:00 pm	at Green Bay	L 88–93	1–8	Resch Center (2,283); Green Bay, WI
12/21/2015; 7:00 pm, TheW.tv	at Santa Clara	W 73–72 ^{OT}	2–8 (1–0)	Alex G. Spanos Center (1,705); Stockton, CA
12/23/2015; 7:00 pm, TheW.tv	at San Francisco	L 76–89	2–9 (1–1)	War Memorial Gymnasium (1,382); San Francisco, CA
12/31/2015; 6:00 pm, TheW.tv	San Diego	W 77–75	3–9 (2–1)	Alex G. Spanos Center (1,778); Stockton, CA
01/02/2016; 3:00 pm, CSNBA	BYU	L 67–81	3–10 (2–2)	Alex G. Spanos Center (3,175); Stockton, CA
01/07/2016; 7:00 pm, TheW.tv	at Pepperdine	L 76–81	3–11 (2–3)	Firestone Fieldhouse (1,289); Malibu, CA
01/09/2016; 3:00 pm, CSNBA	at Loyola Marymount	W 60–58	4–11 (3–3)	Gersten Pavilion (1,595); Los Angeles, CA
01/14/2016; 8:00 pm, ESPNU	at Saint Mary's	L 62–78	4–12 (3–4)	McKeon Pavilion (2,983); Moraga, CA
01/16/2016*; 6:00 pm, TheW.tv	Bethesda University	W 88–30	5–12	Alex G. Spanos Center (2,205); Stockton, CA
01/21/2016; 7:00 pm, TheW.tv	Portland	W 70–61	6–12 (4–4)	Alex G. Spanos Center (2,502); Stockton, CA
01/23/2016; 1:00 pm, TWCSN	Gonzaga	L 61–71	6–13 (4–5)	Alex G. Spanos Center (4,309); Stockton, CA
01/30/2016; 8:00 pm, CSNBA	Saint Mary's	L 65–68	6–14 (4–6)	Alex G. Spanos Center (3,010); Stockton, CA
02/04/2016; 7:00 pm, CSNBA	at San Diego	L 43–54	6–15 (4–7)	Jenny Craig Pavilion (1,422); San Diego, CA
02/06/2016; 1:00 pm, TWCSN	at BYU	W 77–72	7–15 (5–7)	Marriott Center (16,069); Provo, UT
02/11/2016; 7:00 pm, TheW.tv	Loyola Marymount	L 72–77	7–16 (5–8)	Alex G. Spanos Center (2,190); Stockton, CA
02/13/2016; 7:00 pm, TheW.tv	Pepperdine	L 63–65	7–17 (5–9)	Alex G. Spanos Center (2,626); Stockton, CA
02/18/2016; 6:00 pm, CSNBA	at Gonzaga	L 68–90	7–18 (5–10)	McCarthey Athletic Center (6,000); Spokane, WA
02/20/2016; 7:00 pm, CSNBA	at Portland	L 67–80	7–19 (5–11)	Chiles Center (3,103); Portland, OR
02/25/2015; 7:00 pm, TheW.tv	San Francisco	W 79–70	8–19 (6–11)	Alex G. Spanos Center (2,381); Stockton, CA
02/27/2015; 6:00 pm, CSNBA	at Santa Clara	L 65–69	8–20 (6–12)	Leavey Center (3,808); Santa Clara, CA
*Non-conference game. ^{#}Rankings from AP Poll. (#) Tournament seedings in parentheses. All times are in Pacific Time.
