= 2016 West Coast Conference men's basketball tournament =

- Classification: Division I
- Season: 2015–16
- Teams: 9
- Site: Orleans Arena; Paradise, Nevada
- Champions: Gonzaga (15th title)
- Winning coach: Mark Few (13th title)
- MVP: Kyle Wiltjer (Gonzaga)
- Attendance: 37,019

2015–16 West Coast Conference men's basketball standings
	Conf.				Overall
Team	W		L	PCT	W		L	PCT
Saint Mary's	15	–	3	.833	29	–	6	.829
Gonzaga †	15	–	3	.833	28	–	8	.778
BYU	13	–	5	.722	26	–	11	.703
Pepperdine	10	–	8	.556	18	–	14	.563
San Francisco	8	–	10	.444	15	–	15	.500
Santa Clara	7	–	11	.389	11	–	20	.355
Portland	6	–	12	.333	12	–	20	.375
Loyola Marymount	6	–	12	.333	14	–	17	.452
Pacific*	6	–	12	.333	8	–	20	.286
San Diego	4	–	14	.222	9	–	21	.300
† Conference tournament winner *ineligible for postseason due to self probation

The 2016 West Coast Conference men's basketball tournament was the postseason men's basketball tournament for the West Coast Conference and was held March 3–8, 2016 at the Orleans Arena in Paradise, Nevada. The winner of the tournament, Gonzaga, received the conference's automatic bid into the 2016 NCAA tournament.

== Seeds ==
Only 9 of the 10 WCC teams participated in the Tournament due to Pacific's self-imposed postseason ban. As a result, the top 7 teams received a bye into the Quarterfinals. Teams were seeded by record within the conference, with a tiebreaker system to seed teams that had identical conference records.

Seed	School	Conference	Tiebreaker
1	Saint Mary's	15–3	2–0 vs. Gonzaga
2	Gonzaga	15–3	0–2 vs. Saint Mary's
3	BYU	13–5	
4	Pepperdine	10–8	
5	San Francisco	8–10	
6	Santa Clara	7–11	
7	Portland	6–12	2–0 vs. Loyola Marymount
8	Loyola Marymount	6–12	0–2 vs. Portland
9	San Diego	4–14	

== Schedule ==
Session	Game	Time*	Matchup^{#}	Final score	Television
First round – Friday, March 4
1	1	6 p.m.	#8 Loyola Marymount vs. #9 San Diego	64–61	BYUtv
Quarterfinals – Saturday, March 5
2	2	1 p.m.	#3 BYU vs. #6 Santa Clara	72–60	BYUtv and WCC TV
2	3	3 p.m.	#4 Pepperdine vs. #5 San Francisco	90–86	BYUtv and WCC TV
3	4	7 p.m.	#1 Saint Mary's vs. #8 Loyola Marymount	60–48	ESPN2
3	5	9 p.m.	#2 Gonzaga vs. #7 Portland	92–67	ESPN2
Semifinals – Monday, March 7
4	6	6 p.m.	#1 Saint Mary's vs. #4 Pepperdine	81–66	ESPN
4	7	8:30 p.m.	#2 Gonzaga vs. #3 BYU	88–84	ESPN2
Championship – Tuesday, March 8
5	8	6 p.m.	#1 Saint Mary's vs. #2 Gonzaga	75–85	ESPN
*Game times in PT. #-Rankings denote tournament seeding.

== Bracket ==
First round Friday, March 4 BYUtv, TheW.tv
8	Loyola Marymount	64
9	San Diego	61

Quarterfinals; Saturday, March 5 TWC SportsNet, CSNCA, BYUtv, TheW.tv (afternoon); ESPN2 (evening)
1	Saint Mary's	60
8	Loyola Marymount	48
4	Pepperdine	90
5	San Francisco	86
2	Gonzaga	92
7	Portland	67
3	BYU	72
6	Santa Clara	60

Semifinals; Monday, March 7 ESPN (early); ESPN2 (late)
1	Saint Mary's	81
4	Pepperdine	66
2	Gonzaga	88
3	BYU	84

Championship; Tuesday, March 8 ESPN
1	Saint Mary's	75
2	Gonzaga	85

== Game summaries ==
=== First round ===
==== #8 Loyola Marymount vs. #9 San Diego ====
Broadcasters: Dave McCann and Blaine Fowler
Series history: Series even 46–46

BYUtv

Mar 4
6 p.m. PST

Recap

#9 San Diego Toreros 61, #8 Loyola Marymount Lions 64
Scoring by half: 26–30, 35–34
Pts: Olin Carter III, Duda Sanadze 20; Rebs: Olin Carter III, Duda Sanadze 6 Asts: Tyler Williams 4	Pts: Brandon Brown 20; Rebs: David Humphries 7 Asts: Munis Tutu 4

Orleans Arena
Paradise, NV
Attendance: 6,689
Referees: David Hall, Verne Harris, Randy McCall

=== Quarterfinals ===
==== #3 BYU vs. #6 Santa Clara ====
Broadcasters: Dave McCann and Blaine Fowler (BYUtv)
Steve Quis, Casey Jacobsen, and Kelli Tennant (WCC TV)
Series history: BYU leads series 26–5

BYUtv
WCC TV

Mar 5
1 p.m. PST

Recap

#6 Santa Clara Broncos 60, #3 BYU Cougars 72
Scoring by half: 25–35, 35–37
Pts: Jared Brownridge 30; Rebs: Jarvis Pugh 8 Asts: Kai Healy, KJ Feagin, Matt Hauser 2	Pts: Nick Emery 15; Rebs: Kyle Collinsworth 9 Asts: Kyle Collinsworth 6

Orleans Arena
Paradise, NV
Attendance: 7,341
Referees: Ken Ditty, Mark Cook, Ron Brokenbrough

==== #4 Pepperdine vs. #5 San Francisco ====
Broadcasters: Dave McCann and Blaine Fowler (BYUtv)
Steve Quis, Casey Jacobsen, and Kelli Tennant (WCC TV)
Series history: San Francisco leads series 76–51

BYUtv
WCC TV

Mar 5
3 p.m. PST

Recap

#5 San Francisco Dons 86, #4 Pepperdine Waves 90
Scoring by half: 37–36, 49–54
Pts: Devin Watson 33; Rebs: Uche Ofoegbu 5 Asts: Devin Watson, Tim Derksen 3	Pts: Jeremy Major 28; Rebs: Stacy Davis 12; Asts: Jeremy Major, Amadi Udenyi 5

Orleans Arena
Paradise, NV
Attendance: 7,341
Referees: Dick Carmell, Horace Shields, Rob Rorke

==== #1 Saint Mary's vs. #8 Loyola Marymount ====
Broadcasters: Roxy Bernstein and Brad Daugherty
Series history: Saint Mary's leads series 85–54

ESPN2

Mar 5
7 p.m. PST

Recap

#8 Loyola Marymount Lions 48, #1 Saint Mary's Gaels 60
Scoring by half: 29–25, 19–35
Pts: Steven Haney 19; Rebs: Jeffrey McClendon 4 Asts: Munis Tutu, Brandon Brown 2	Pts: Dane Pineau 16; Rebs: Joe Rahon 10; Asts: Emmett Naar 6

Orleans Arena
Paradise, NV
Attendance: 7,209
Referees: Bill Vinovich, Deldre Carr, Jeff Ketchu

==== #2 Gonzaga vs. #7 Portland ====
Broadcasters: Roxy Bernstein and Brad Daugherty
Series history: Gonzaga leads series 97–66

ESPN2

Mar 5
9 p.m. PST

Recap

#7 Portland Pilots 67, #2 Gonzaga Bulldogs 92
Scoring by half: 32–46, 35–46
Pts: Bryce Pressley 16; Rebs: D'Marques Tyson 6 Asts: Bryce Pressley, Jazz Johnson 3	Pts: Eric McClellan 26; Rebs: Kyle Dranginis, Kyle Wiltjer 8 Asts: Kyle Dranginis 5

Orleans Arena
Paradise, NV
Attendance: 7,209
Referees: Klaus Endnssat, Coban Lopez, Dennis Flannery

=== Semifinals ===
==== #1 Saint Mary's vs. #4 Pepperdine ====
Broadcasters: Brent Musburger and Dick Vitale
Series history: Pepperdine leads series 71–64

ESPN

Mar 5
6 p.m. PST

Recap

#4 Pepperdine Waves vs. #1 Saint Mary's Gaels 81
Scoring by half: 24–44, 42–37
Pts: Lamond Murray, Jr. 20; Rebs: Stacy Davis 7 Asts: Amadi Udenyi 4	Pts: Joe Rahon 18; Rebs: Dane Pineau 9 Asts: Emmett Naar 9

Orleans Arena
Paradise, NV
Attendance: 8,362
Referees: Tony Padilla, Mike Reed, David Hall

==== #2 Gonzaga vs. #3 BYU ====
Broadcasters: Brent Musburger and Fran Fraschilla
Series history: Gonzaga leads series 9–6

ESPN2

Mar 7
8:30 p.m. PST

Recap

#3 BYU Cougars 84, #2 Gonzaga Bulldogs 88
Scoring by half: 47–47, 37–41
Pts: Nick Emery 27; Rebs: Kyle Collinsworth 11; Asts: Kyle Collinsworth 6	Pts: Kyle Wiltjer 29; Rebs: Domantas Sabonis 14; Asts: Josh Perkins 5

Orleans Arena
Paradise, NV
Attendance: 8,362
Referees: Randy McCall, Verne Harris, Dick Cartmell

=== Championship: #1 Saint Mary's vs. #2 Gonzaga ===
Broadcasters: Brent Musburger, Dick Vitale and Fran Fraschilla (ESPN)
Kevin Calabro and P. J. Carlesimo (Westwood One)
Series history:

ESPN

Mar 8
6 p.m. PST

Recap

#2 Gonzaga Bulldogs 85, #1 Saint Mary's Gaels 75
Scoring by half: 43–35, 42–40
Pts: Eric McClellan 20; Rebs: Domantas Sabonis 8 Asts: Josh Perkins 5	Pts: Emmett Naar 25; Rebs: Dane Pineau 10; Asts: Emmett Naar 6

Orleans Arena
Paradise, NV
Attendance: 7,418
Referees: Randy McCall, David Hall, Verne Harris

== See also ==
- West Coast Conference men's basketball tournament
- 2016 West Coast Conference women's basketball tournament
