= 2015–16 San Diego Toreros men's basketball team =

American college basketball season

2015–16 San Diego Toreros men's basketball
- Conference: West Coast Conference
- Record: 9–21 (4–14 WCC)
- Head coach: Lamont Smith (1st season)
- Assistant coaches: Russell Springmann; Sam Scholl; Chris Gerlufsen
- Home arena: Jenny Craig Pavilion

2015–16 West Coast Conference men's basketball standings
	Conf.				Overall
Team	W		L	PCT	W		L	PCT
Saint Mary's	15	–	3	.833	29	–	6	.829
Gonzaga †	15	–	3	.833	28	–	8	.778
BYU	13	–	5	.722	26	–	11	.703
Pepperdine	10	–	8	.556	18	–	14	.563
San Francisco	8	–	10	.444	15	–	15	.500
Santa Clara	7	–	11	.389	11	–	20	.355
Portland	6	–	12	.333	12	–	20	.375
Loyola Marymount	6	–	12	.333	14	–	17	.452
Pacific*	6	–	12	.333	8	–	20	.286
San Diego	4	–	14	.222	9	–	21	.300
† Conference tournament winner *ineligible for postseason due to self probation

The 2015–16 San Diego Toreros men's basketball team represented the University of San Diego during the 2015–16 NCAA Division I men's basketball season. This was head coach Lamont Smith's first season at San Diego. The Toreros competed in the West Coast Conference and played their home games at the Jenny Craig Pavilion. They finished the season 9–21, 4–14 in WCC play to finish in last place. They lost in the first round of the WCC tournament to Loyola Marymount.

== Previous season ==
The Toreros finished the season 15–16, 8–10 in WCC play to finish in fifth place. They lost in the quarterfinals of the WCC tournament to Pepperdine.

== Departures ==
Name	Number	Pos.	Height	Weight	Year	Hometown	Notes
Christopher Anderson	00	G	5'7"	150	Senior	Anaheim Hills, CA	Graduated
Johnny Dee	1	G	6'0"	175	Senior	Vista, CA	Graduated
Therone Tillett	4	G	5'11"	180	Junior	Spokane, WA	Left the team for personal reasons
Chris Sarbaugh	5	G	6'3"	200	Junior	Spokane, WA	Graduated transferred to Idaho
Thomas Jacobs	15	F	6'6"	215	RS Senior	San Diego, CA	Graduated
Adam Gotelli	20	G	6'2"	175	Freshman	Stockton, CA	Walk-on; left the team for personal reasons
Forrest Greenwalt	21	G	5'9"	160	Sophomore	San Antonio, TX	Walk on; didn't return
Nick Kerr	22	G	6'3"	180	RS Junior	San Diego, CA	Transferred to California
Simi Fajemisin	25	F/C	6'10"	267	RS Senior	Lynnwood, WA	Graduated

== Recruits class of 2015 ==
College recruiting information
Name	Hometown	School	Height	Weight	Commit date
Tyler Williams; SG	Plano, TX	Hebron High School	6 ft 4 in (1.93 m)	180 lb (82 kg)	May 1, 2015
Tyler Williams; SG	Recruit ratings: Scout: Rivals: (78)				
Alex Floresca; SF	St. Louis, MO	Webster Groves High School	6 ft 7 in (2.01 m)	215 lb (98 kg)	Aug 6, 2014
Alex Floresca; SF	Recruit ratings: Scout: Rivals: (NR)				
Olin Carter III; PG	Allen, TX	Allen High School	6 ft 1 in (1.85 m)	180 lb (82 kg)	May 3, 2015
Olin Carter III; PG	Recruit ratings: Scout: Rivals: (NR)				
Hunter Summy; SG	Southlake, TX	Carroll High School	6 ft 3 in (1.91 m)	N/A	Oct 22, 2014
Hunter Summy; SG	Recruit ratings: Scout: Rivals: (NR)				
Ryan Woolridge; PG	Mansfield, TX	Lake Ridge High School	6 ft 3 in (1.91 m)	161 lb (73 kg)	May 17, 2015
Ryan Woolridge; PG	Recruit ratings: Scout: Rivals: (NR)				
Overall recruit ranking: Scout: nr Rivals: nr ESPN: nr
Note: In many cases, Scout, Rivals, 247Sports, On3, and ESPN may conflict in their listings of height and weight.; In these cases, the average was taken. ESPN grades are on a 100-point scale.; Sources: "San Diego Toreros 2015 Basketball Commitments". Rivals.; "2015 San Diego Toreros Basketball Commits". Scout.; "ESPN 2015 San Diego Toreros Basketball recruits". ESPN.; "Scout.com Team Recruiting Rankings". Scout.; "2015 Team Ranking". Rivals.

== Roster ==
2015–16 San Diego Toreros men's basketball team
Players
Coaches

Pos.	#	Name	Height	Weight	Year	Previous school	Hometown
G	0	Khalil Bedart-Ghani	6 ft 4 in (1.93 m)	192 lb (87 kg)	So	Loyola	Los Angeles, CA
G	1	Tyler Williams	6 ft 5 in (1.96 m)	190 lb (86 kg)	Fr	Hebron	Plano, TX
F/C	2	Brandon Perry	6 ft 7 in (2.01 m)	265 lb (120 kg)	RS Jr	Taft; Cal State Northridge	Fresno, CA
G	3	Olin Carter III	6 ft 2 in (1.88 m)	190 lb (86 kg)	Fr	Allen	Allen, TX
G	4	Vasa Pusica	6 ft 5 in (1.96 m)	210 lb (95 kg)	So	Sunrise Christian Academy	Belgrade, Serbia
G	10	Duda Sanadze	6 ft 5 in (1.96 m)	210 lb (95 kg)	Sr	XXXX	Tbilisi, Georgia
G	11	Marcus Harris	6 ft 0 in (1.83 m)	168 lb (76 kg)	So	MacArthur	San Antonio, TX
F	12	Cameron Naubauer	6 ft 7 in (2.01 m)	220 lb (100 kg)	So	Choate Rosemary Hall Prep	Berlin, Germany
F	15	Alex Floresca	6 ft 8 in (2.03 m)	230 lb (104 kg)	Fr	Webster Groves	Webster Groves, MO
G	21	Hunter Summy	6 ft 4 in (1.93 m)	180 lb (82 kg)	Fr	Carroll	Southlake, TX
F	24	Christian Oshita (W)	6 ft 6 in (1.98 m)	190 lb (86 kg)	Fr	Bishop Montgomery	Torrance, CA
G	30	Ryan Woolridge	6 ft 3 in (1.91 m)	170 lb (77 kg)	Fr	Lake Ridge	Mansfield, TX
F	32	Brett Bailey	6 ft 6 in (1.98 m)	205 lb (93 kg)	Jr	University	Spokane, WA
C	33	Jito Kok	6 ft 9 in (2.06 m)	232 lb (105 kg)	Sr	Canarius Basketball Academy	Wageningen, Netherlands

Head coach

- Lamont Smith (San Diego)

Assistant coach(es)

- Russell Springmann (Salisbury)
- Sam Scholl (San Diego)
- Chris Gerlufsen (Randolph–Macon)

Legend

- (C) Team captain
- (S) Suspended
- (I) Ineligible
- (W) Walk-on
- Injured
- Current redshirt

Roster

== Schedule and results ==
Date time, TV	Opponent	Result	Record	Site (attendance) city, state
Exhibition
11/07/2015*; 6:00 pm, TheW.tv	Caltech	W 95–42		Jenny Craig Pavilion; San Diego, CA
Non-conference regular season
11/13/2015*; 5:00 pm, P12N LA	at USC	L 45–83	0–1	Galen Center (3,434); Los Angeles, CA
11/17/2015*; 4:00 pm, ESPN3	at Western Michigan	L 62–74	0–2	University Arena (2,087); Kalamazoo, MI
11/21/2015*; 3:00 pm, BigWest.tv	at Cal State Fullerton	L 55–67	0–3	Titan Gym (851); Fullerton, CA
11/26/2015*; 11:00 pm, CBSSN	vs. Loyola–Chicago; Great Alaska Shootout quarterfinals	L 57–67	0–4	Alaska Airlines Center (2,362); Anchorage, AK
11/27/2015*; 1:00 pm, GCI	vs. San Jose State; Great Alaska Shootout consolation	L 67–76	0–5	Alaska Airlines Center (2,379); Anchorage, AK
11/28/2015*; 1:00 pm, GCI	vs. Drexel; Great Alaska Shootout 7th place game	W 62–59	1–5	Alaska Airlines Center (2,193); Anchorage, AK
12/02/2015*; 7:00 pm, TheW.tv	Bethesda	W 71–56	2–5	Jenny Craig Pavilion (1,281); San Diego, CA
12/06/2015*; 2:00 pm, FSSD	vs. San Diego State; City Championship	W 53–48	3–5	Petco Park (10,086); San Diego, CA
12/09/2015*; 7:00 pm, TheW.tv	Denver	L 47–59	3–6	Jenny Craig Pavilion (1,249); San Diego, CA
12/15/2015*; 7:30 pm, TheW.tv	UC Davis	W 61–55	4–6	Jenny Craig Pavilion (1,964); San Diego, CA
12/23/2015*; 7:00 pm, TheW.tv	Cal State Northridge	W 82–63	5–6	Jenny Craig Pavilion (1,634); San Diego, CA
WCC regular season
12/31/2015; 6:00 pm	at Pacific	L 75–77	5–7 (0–1)	Alex G. Spanos Center (1,778); Stockton, CA
01/02/2016; 7:00 pm	at Saint Mary's	L 46–79	5–8 (0–2)	McKeon Pavilion (2,185); Moraga, CA
01/07/2016; 7:00 pm, FSSD	San Francisco	L 65–73	5–9 (0–3)	Jenny Craig Pavilion (2,102); San Diego, CA
01/09/2016; 7:00 pm, TWCSN	Santa Clara	L 53–65	5–10 (0–4)	Jenny Craig Pavilion (1,664); San Diego, CA
01/14/2016; 7:00 pm, RTNW	at Portland	W 82–71	6–10 (1–4)	Chiles Center (1,592); Portland, OR
01/16/2016; 5:00 pm, KHQ/RTNW	at No. 25 Gonzaga	L 52–88	6–11 (1–5)	McCarthey Athletic Center (6,000); Spokane, WA
01/21/2016; 6:00 pm, TWCSN	at Pepperdine	L 58–76	6–12 (1–6)	Firestone Fieldhouse (1,030); Malibu, CA
01/23/2016; 3:00 pm, TWCSN	at Loyola Marymount	L 63–67	6–13 (1–7)	Gersten Pavilion (3,120); Los Angeles, CA
01/28/2016; 7:30 pm, TWCSN	Pepperdine	L 65–75	6–14 (1–8)	Jenny Craig Pavilion (1,593); San Diego, CA
01/30/2016; 1:00 pm, TWCSN	Loyola Marymount	W 77–69	7–14 (2–8)	Jenny Craig Pavilion (1,548); San Diego, CA
02/04/2015; 7:00 pm, FSSD	Pacific	W 54–43	8–14 (3–8)	Jenny Craig Pavilion (1,422); San Diego, CA
02/06/2016; 6:00 pm, FSSD	Saint Mary's	L 43–60	8–15 (3–9)	Jenny Craig Pavilion (2,292); San Diego, CA
02/11/2016; 7:00 pm	at Santa Clara	L 71–74	8–16 (3–10)	Leavey Center (1,428); Santa Clara, CA
02/13/2016; 3:00 pm, CSNCA	at San Francisco	L 51–68	8–17 (3–11)	War Memorial Gymnasium (1,358); San Francisco, CA
02/18/2016; 8:00 pm, ESPNU	BYU	L 67–69	8–18 (3–12)	Jenny Craig Pavilion (3,056); San Diego, CA
02/20/2016; 6:00 pm, BYUtv	at BYU	L 33–91	8–19 (3–13)	Marriott Center (16,324); Provo, UT
02/25/2016; 7:00 pm, TWCSN	Gonzaga	L 60–82	8–20 (3–14)	Jenny Craig Pavilion (4,076); San Diego, CA
02/27/2016; 6:00 pm, TWCSN	Portland	W 85–76	9–20 (4–14)	Jenny Craig Pavilion (1,942); San Diego, CA
WCC tournament
03/04/2016; 6:00 pm, TheW.tv/BYUtv	vs. Loyola Marymount; First round	L 61–64	9–21	Orleans Arena (6,689); Paradise, NV
*Non-conference game. ^{#}Rankings from AP Poll. (#) Tournament seedings in parentheses. All times are in Pacific Time.

== See also ==
- 2015–16 San Diego Toreros women's basketball team
