= 2015–16 Santa Clara Broncos men's basketball team =

American college basketball season

2015–16 Santa Clara Broncos men's basketball
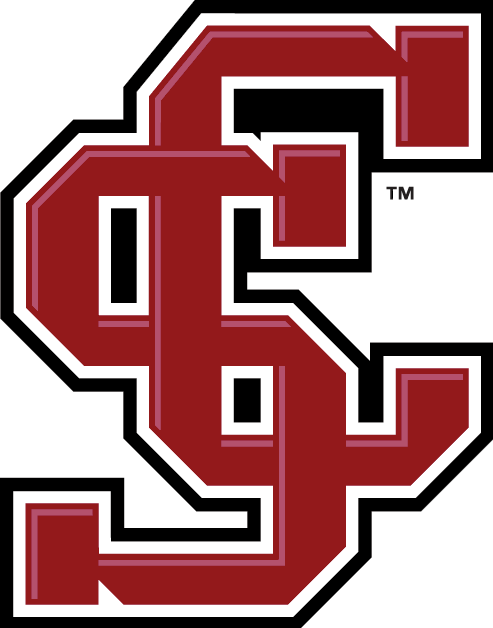
- Conference: West Coast Conference
- Record: 11–20 (7–11 WCC)
- Head coach: Kerry Keating (9th season)
- Assistant coaches: Steve Snell; Jessie Pruitt; Michael Peck
- Home arena: Leavey Center

2015–16 West Coast Conference men's basketball standings
	Conf.				Overall
Team	W		L	PCT	W		L	PCT
Saint Mary's	15	–	3	.833	29	–	6	.829
Gonzaga †	15	–	3	.833	28	–	8	.778
BYU	13	–	5	.722	26	–	11	.703
Pepperdine	10	–	8	.556	18	–	14	.563
San Francisco	8	–	10	.444	15	–	15	.500
Santa Clara	7	–	11	.389	11	–	20	.355
Portland	6	–	12	.333	12	–	20	.375
Loyola Marymount	6	–	12	.333	14	–	17	.452
Pacific*	6	–	12	.333	8	–	20	.286
San Diego	4	–	14	.222	9	–	21	.300
† Conference tournament winner *ineligible for postseason due to self probation

The 2015–16 Santa Clara Broncos men's basketball team represented Santa Clara University during the 2015–16 NCAA Division I men's basketball season. This was head coach Kerry Keating's ninth season at Santa Clara. The Broncos played their home games at the Leavey Center and were members of the West Coast Conference. They finished the season 11–20, 7–11 in WCC play to finish in sixth place. They lost in the quarterfinals of the WCC tournament to BYU.

On March 7, 2016, head coach Kerry Keating was fired by Santa Clara. He finished at Santa Clara with a nine-year record of 139–159 and was the first coach to win both a College Basketball Invitational and a CollegeInsider.com Tournament titles. On March 29, the school hired Herb Sendek.

== Previous season ==
The Broncos finished the 2014–15 season 14–18, 7–11 in WCC play to finish in a three-way tie for sixth place. They advanced to the quarterfinals of the WCC tournament where they lost to BYU.

== Departures ==
Name	Number	Pos.	Height	Weight	Year	Hometown	Notes
Stephen Edwards	0	G	6'2"	180	Freshman	Muskogee, OK	Transferred to Trinity Valley CC
Brandon Clark	3	G	6'0"	170	Senior	East Chicago, IN	Graduated
Jalen Richard	5	G	6'3"	180	Sophomore	San Tan Valley, AZ	Transferred to Cal State East Bay
Denzel Johnson	20	G	6'3"	189	Senior	Fresno, CA	Graduated
Andrew Papenfus	30	F	6'5"	215	Senior	Snowmass, CO	Graduated
Robert Garrett	35	C	7'0"	270	Senior	Vallejo, CA	Graduated
Yannick Atanga	44	F	6'8"	220	Senior	Yaoundé, Cameroon	Graduated

=== Incoming transfers ===
Name	Number	Pos.	Height	Weight	Year	Hometown	Previous School
Brendyn Taylor	5	G	6'3"	185	RS Junior	Los Angeles, CA	Transferred from USC. Under NCAA transfer rules, Taylor will have to sit out for the 2015–16 season. Will have two years of remaining eligibility.

== Recruiting ==
College recruiting information
Name	Hometown	School	Height	Weight	Commit date
Ke'Jhan Feagin; PG	Long Beach, CA	Long Beach Polytechnic High School	5 ft 11 in (1.80 m)	155 lb (70 kg)	
Ke'Jhan Feagin; PG	Recruit ratings: Scout: Rivals: (68)				
Matt Hauser; SG	Thousand Oaks, CA	Thousand Oaks High School	6 ft 0 in (1.83 m)	160 lb (73 kg)	May 11, 2014
Matt Hauser; SG	Recruit ratings: Scout: Rivals: (66)				
Tony Lewis; C	San Antonio, TX	Central Catholic High School	6 ft 9 in (2.06 m)	230 lb (100 kg)	Sep 28, 2014
Tony Lewis; C	Recruit ratings: Scout: Rivals: (NR)				
Bryson Lockley; PF	Houston, TX	Cy-Fair High School	6 ft 6 in (1.98 m)	N/A	Sep 25, 2014
Bryson Lockley; PF	Recruit ratings: Scout: Rivals: (NR)				
Overall recruit ranking: Scout: nr Rivals: nr ESPN: nr
Note: In many cases, Scout, Rivals, 247Sports, On3, and ESPN may conflict in their listings of height and weight.; In these cases, the average was taken. ESPN grades are on a 100-point scale.; Sources: "Santa Clara 2015 Basketball Commitments". Rivals.; "2015 Santa Clara Basketball Commits". Scout.; "ESPN". ESPN.; "Scout.com Team Recruiting Rankings". Scout.; "2015 Team Ranking". Rivals.

== Roster ==
2015–16 Santa Clara Broncos men's basketball team
Players
Coaches

Pos.	#	Name	Height	Weight	Year	Previous school	Hometown
F	1	Evan Wardlow	6 ft 4 in (1.93 m)	180 lb (82 kg)	So	El Camino Real	Lake View Terrace, CA
F	3	Henrik Jädersten	6 ft 11 in (2.11 m)	235 lb (107 kg)	Fr	Solna Gymnasium	Stockholm, Sweden
G	4	Jarvis Pugh	6 ft 6 in (1.98 m)	210 lb (95 kg)	RS So	Plano East	Murphy, TX
G	5	Brendyn Taylor (I) (redshirt)	6 ft 3 in (1.91 m)	195 lb (88 kg)	Jr	Fairfax; USC	Los Angeles, CA
G	10	Kai Healy	6 ft 5 in (1.96 m)	205 lb (93 kg)	So	The Scots College in Bellevue Hills	Wahroonga, Sydney, Australia
G	12	Matt Hauser	6 ft 2 in (1.88 m)	170 lb (77 kg)	Fr	Thousand Oaks	Thousand Oaks, CA
G	13	Bryson Lockley	6 ft 7 in (2.01 m)	210 lb (95 kg)	Fr	Cy Fair	Houston, TX
F	15	Tony Lewis	6 ft 8 in (2.03 m)	260 lb (118 kg)	Fr	Central Catholic	San Antonio, TX
F	22	Matt Hubbard	6 ft 9 in (2.06 m)	230 lb (104 kg)	So	Colville	Colville, WA,
G	23	Jared Brownridge	6 ft 3 in (1.91 m)	200 lb (91 kg)	Jr	Waubonsie Valley	Aurora, IL
G	30	Werner Nistler	6 ft 2 in (1.88 m)	170 lb (77 kg)	Sr	Jesuit	Portland, OR
G	32	K. J. Feagin	6 ft 1 in (1.85 m)	175 lb (79 kg)	Fr	Long Beach Poly	Long Beach, CA
F	43	Nate Kratch	6 ft 6 in (1.98 m)	227 lb (103 kg)	RS Jr	Watertown-Mayer	Watertown, MN
C	50	Emmanuel Ndumanya	6 ft 9 in (2.06 m)	267 lb (121 kg)	RS So	Junípero Serra	Anambra, Nigeria

Head coach

- Kerry Keating (Seton Hall)

Assistant coach(es)

- Steve Snell (Radford)
- Jesse Pruitt (UC Davis)
- Mike Peck (Northwood)

Legend

- (C) Team captain
- (S) Suspended
- (I) Ineligible
- (W) Walk-on
- Injured
- Current redshirt

Roster

== Schedule and results ==
Date time, TV	Opponent	Result	Record	Site (attendance) city, state
Exhibition
November 6, 2015*; 7:00 pm	Notre Dame de Namur	W 86–44		Leavey Center (1,302); Santa Clara, CA
Non-conference regular season
November 13, 2015*; 7:00 pm, TheW.tv	Lipscomb; Cable Car Classic	L 63–65 ^{2OT}	0–1	Leavey Center (1,552); Santa Clara, CA
November 14, 2015*; 8:00 pm, TheW.tv	Denver; Cable Car Classic	L 33–55	0–2	Leavey Center (1,150); Santa Clara, CA
November 15, 2015*; 2:30 pm, TheW.tv	Milwaukee; Cable Car Classic	L 65–71	0–3	Leavey Center (1,314); Santa Clara, CA
November 19, 2015*; 7:00 pm	at UC Riverside	L 63–77	0–4	SRC (486); Riverside, CA
November 23, 2015*; 7:00 pm	at UC Irvine; Wooden Legacy	L 61–79	0–5	Bren Events Center (2,359); Irvine, CA
November 26, 2015*; 8:30 pm, ESPN2	vs. No. 11 Arizona; Wooden Legacy quarterfinals	L 73–75 ^{OT}	0–6	Titan Gym (2,460); Fullerton, CA
November 27, 2015*; 6:00 pm, ESPN3	vs. Evansville; Wooden Legacy 2nd round consolation	L 57–69	0–7	Titan Gym (2,873); Fullerton, CA
November 29, 2015*; 4:30 pm, ESPN3	vs. Boston College; Wooden Legacy 7th place game	W 62–45	1–7	Honda Center (4,393); Anaheim, CA
December 5, 2015*; 7:00 pm, TheW.tv	San Jose State	W 78–75	2–7	Leavey Center (1,676); Santa Clara, CA
December 12, 2015*; 7:30 pm, TheW.tv	Pacific Union	W 73–66	3–7	Leavey Center (1,002); Santa Clara, CA
December 15, 2015*; 7:00 pm, TheW.tv	Arkansas–Pine Bluff	W 69–57	4–7	Leavey Center (1,241); Santa Clara, CA
December 18, 2015*; 7:00 pm, MW Net	at Nevada	L 69–72	4–8	Lawlor Events Center (5,813); Reno, NV
WCC regular season
December 21, 2015; 7:00 pm, TheW.tv	at Pacific	L 72–73 ^{OT}	4–9 (0–1)	Alex G. Spanos Center (1,705); Stockton, CA
December 23, 2015; 8:00 pm, CSNCA	Saint Mary's	L 59–81	4–10 (0–2)	Leavey Center (1,950); Santa Clara, CA
December 31, 2015; 2:00 pm, CSNCA	Gonzaga	L 77–79	4–11 (0–3)	Leavey Center (3,121); Santa Clara, CA
January 2, 2016; 1:00 pm, TWCSN	Portland	W 84–77	5–11 (1–3)	Leavey Center (1,365); Santa Clara, CA
January 7, 2016; 8:00 pm, ESPNU	at BYU	L 61–97	5–12 (1–4)	Marriott Center (12,77); Provo, UT
January 9, 2016; 7:00 pm, TWCSN	at San Diego	W 65–53	6–12 (2–4)	Jenny Craig Pavilion (1,664); San Diego, CA
January 14, 2016; 7:00 pm, TheW.tv	Pepperdine	W 62–60	7–12 (3–4)	Leavey Center (1,394); Santa Clara, CA
January 16, 2016; 8:00 pm, CSNBA	Loyola Marymount	L 66–76	7–13 (3–5)	Leavey Center (1,572); Santa Clara, CA
January 21, 2016; 8:00 pm, CSNBA	San Francisco	L 61–74	7–14 (3–6)	Leavey Center (1,413); Santa Clara, CA
January 28, 2016; 6:00 pm, CSNBA/CSNCA	at Gonzaga	L 67–84	7–15 (3–7)	McCarthey Athletic Center (6,000); Spokane, WA
January 31, 2016; 7:00 pm, TheW.tv	at Portland	W 90–84	8–15 (4–7)	Chiles Center (2,242); Portland, OR
February 6, 2016; 8:00 pm, CSNCA	at San Francisco	L 86–89	8–16 (4–8)	War Memorial Gymnasium (1,538); San Francisco, CA
February 11, 2016; 7:00 pm, TheW.tv	San Diego	W 74–71	9–16 (5–8)	Leavey Center (1,428); Santa Clara, CA
February 13, 2016; 1:00 pm, TWCSN	BYU	L 62–96	9–17 (5–9)	Leavey Center (2,469); Santa Clara, CA
February 18, 2016; 7:00 pm, TheW.tv	at Loyola Marymount	W 76–72	10–17 (6–9)	Gersten Pavilion (1,721); Los Angeles, CA
February 20, 2016; 5:00 pm, TWCSN	at Pepperdine	L 76–88	10–18 (6–10)	Firestone Fieldhouse (1,977); Malibu, CA
February 25, 2016; 8:00 pm, CSNCA	at Saint Mary's	L 50–75	10–19 (6–11)	McKeon Pavilion (3,165); Moraga, CA
February 27, 2016; 6:00 pm, CSNCA	Pacific	W 69–65	11–19 (7–11)	Leavey Center (3,808); Santa Clara, CA
WCC tournament
03/05/2016; 1:00 pm, BYUtv/CSNCA/TWCSN	vs. BYU; Quarterfinals	L 60–72	11–20	Orleans Arena (7,341); Paradise, NV
*Non-conference game. ^{#}Rankings from AP Poll. (#) Tournament seedings in parentheses. All times are in Pacific Time.
