= 2015–16 Portland Pilots men's basketball team =

American college basketball season

2015–16 Portland Pilots men's basketball
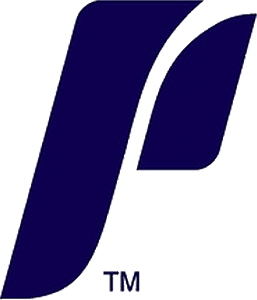
- Conference: West Coast Conference
- Record: 12–20 (6–12 WCC)
- Head coach: Eric Reveno (10th season)
- Assistant coaches: Eric Jackson; Colin Pfaff; Mitch Johnson
- Home arena: Chiles Center

2015–16 West Coast Conference men's basketball standings
	Conf.				Overall
Team	W		L	PCT	W		L	PCT
Saint Mary's	15	–	3	.833	29	–	6	.829
Gonzaga †	15	–	3	.833	28	–	8	.778
BYU	13	–	5	.722	26	–	11	.703
Pepperdine	10	–	8	.556	18	–	14	.563
San Francisco	8	–	10	.444	15	–	15	.500
Santa Clara	7	–	11	.389	11	–	20	.355
Portland	6	–	12	.333	12	–	20	.375
Loyola Marymount	6	–	12	.333	14	–	17	.452
Pacific*	6	–	12	.333	8	–	20	.286
San Diego	4	–	14	.222	9	–	21	.300
† Conference tournament winner *ineligible for postseason due to self probation

The 2015–16 Portland Pilots men's basketball team represented the University of Portland during the 2015–16 NCAA Division I men's basketball season. The Pilots, led by tenth-year head coach Eric Reveno, played their home games at the Chiles Center and were members of the West Coast Conference. They finished the season 12–20, 6–12 in WCC play to finish in a three way tie for seventh place. They lost in the quarterfinals of the WCC tournament to Gonzaga.

On March 15, 2016, the school fired head coach Eric Reveno. He finished at Portland with a 10-year record of 140–178.

== Previous season ==
The Pilots finished the 2014–15 season 17–16, 7–11 in WCC play to finish in a three way tie for sixth place. They advanced to the semifinals of the WCC tournament where they lost to BYU. They were invited to the CollegeInsdier.com Tournament where they lost in the first round to Sacramento State.

== Departures ==
Name	Number	Pos.	Height	Weight	Year	Hometown	Notes
Kevin Bailey	00	G	6'5"	205	Senior	Clovis, CA	Graduated
Bobby Sharp	11	G	6'2"	165	Senior	Santa Rosa, CA	Graduated
Thomas van der Mars	12	C	6'11"	235	Senior	Gouda, Netherlands	Graduated
Riley Barker	14	C	6'10"	240	RS Senior	Surrey, BC	Graduated
David Carr	35	G	6'3"	180	Senior	Portland, OR	Graduate transferred
Volodymyr Gerun	52	F/C	6'10'	250	Senior	Dnipropetrovsk, Ukraine	Graduated
Aitor Zubizarreta	54	G	6'3"	175	Sophomore	Azpeitia, Gipuzkoa	Transferred to College of Idaho

=== Incoming transfers ===
Name	Number	Pos.	Height	Weight	Year	Hometown	Notes
Ray Barreno	32	C	6'11"	265	Junior	Ascension Chihuahua, Mexico	Junior college transferred from New Mexico Junior College
Jarrel Marshall	33	F	6'6"		Junior	Mount Vernon, NY	Junior college transferred from Palm Beach State College

== Recruitment ==
College recruiting
Name	Hometown	School	Height	Weight	Commit date
Jazz Johnson; PG	Lake Oswego, OR	Lake Oswego High School	5 ft 11 in (1.80 m)	170 lb (77 kg)	Jun 26, 2013
Jazz Johnson; PG	Recruit ratings: Scout: Rivals: (67)				
Colin Russell; PF	Folsom, CA	Folsom High School	6 ft 7 in (2.01 m)	215 lb (98 kg)	Sep 15, 2014
Colin Russell; PF	Recruit ratings: Scout: Rivals: (65)				
Rashad Jackson; SG	Bakersfield, CA	Impact Basketball Academy	6 ft 3 in (1.91 m)	180 lb (82 kg)	
Rashad Jackson; SG	Recruit ratings: Scout: Rivals: (59)				
Overall recruit ranking: Scout: nr Rivals: nr ESPN: nr
Note: In many cases, Scout, Rivals, 247Sports, On3, and ESPN may conflict in their listings of height and weight.; In these cases, the average was taken. ESPN grades are on a 100-point scale.; Sources: "Portland Pilots 2015 Basketball Commitments". Rivals.; "2015 Portland Pilots Basketball Commits". Scout.; "ESPN 2015 Portland Pilots Basketball recruits". ESPN.; "Scout.com Team Recruiting Rankings". Scout.; "2015 Team Ranking". Rivals.

== Roster ==
2015–16 Portland Pilots men's basketball team
Players
Coaches

Pos.	#	Name	Height	Weight	Year	Previous school	Hometown
G	0	Xavier Hallinan (W)	6 ft 0 in (1.83 m)	160 lb (73 kg)	Fr	Central Catholic	Portland, OR
G	1	Bryce Pressley	6 ft 4 in (1.93 m)	210 lb (95 kg)	Sr	Jesuit	Sacramento, CA
G	2	Alec Wintering	5 ft 11 in (1.8 m)	170 lb (77 kg)	Jr	United Faith	Concord, NC
G	3	Rashad Jackson	6 ft 4 in (1.93 m)	180 lb (82 kg)	Fr	Impact Basketball Academy	Bakersfield, CA
G	5	D'Marques Tyson	6 ft 5 in (1.96 m)	205 lb (93 kg)	So	Quality Education Academy	Bothell, WA
G/F	10	Jason Todd	6 ft 4 in (1.93 m)	210 lb (95 kg)	So	Jackson HS	Mill Creek, WA
F/C	11	Colin Russell	6 ft 9 in (2.06 m)	220 lb (100 kg)	Fr	Folsom HS	Folsom, CA
C	15	Philipp Hartwich	7 ft 0 in (2.13 m)	230 lb (104 kg)	So	Dreikonigs Gymnasium	Cologne, Germany
G/F	20	Max Livingston (W)	6 ft 5 in (1.96 m)	210 lb (95 kg)	Sr	Clark College; Lake Oswego	Lake Oswego, OR
G	22	Jazz Johnson	6 ft 0 in (1.83 m)	200 lb (91 kg)	Fr	Lake Oswego	Lake Oswego, OR
F	24	Gabe Taylor	6 ft 8 in (2.03 m)	230 lb (104 kg)	So	Valley Catholic School	Portland, OR
G/F	25	Chier Maker	6 ft 7 in (2.01 m)	200 lb (91 kg)	Fr	Newington College	Sydney, Australia
C	32	Ray Barreno	6 ft 11 in (2.11 m)	270 lb (122 kg)	Jr	New Mexico JC; Faith Christian Acad.	Ascension Chihuahua, Mexico
G/F	33	Jarrel Marshall	6 ft 6 in (1.98 m)	190 lb (86 kg)	Jr	Palm Beach State College; Mount Vernon HS	Mount Vernon, NY

Head coach

- Eric Reveno (Stanford)

Assistant coach(es)

- Eric Jackson (Green Bay)
- Colin Pfaff (Cal State Monterey Bay)
- Mitch Johnson (Stanford)

Legend

- (C) Team captain
- (S) Suspended
- (I) Ineligible
- (W) Walk-on
- Injured
- Current redshirt

Roster

== Schedule and results ==
Date time, TV	Opponent	Result	Record	Site (attendance) city, state
Exhibition
11/07/2015*; 2:00 pm	Concordia-Irvine	W 85–78		Chiles Center (1,003); Portland, OR
Non-conference regular season
11/13/2015*; 7:00 pm, TheW.tv	Oregon Tech	W 98–81	1–0	Chiles Center (1,858); Portland, OR
11/15/2015*; 4:00 pm	at UC Davis	L 66–79	1–1	The Pavilion (1,372); Davis, CA
11/20/2015*; 6:00 pm, P12N	at Colorado	L 63–85	1–2	Coors Events Center (7,783); Boulder, CO
11/22/2015*; 7:00 pm	Abilene Christian; Corpus Christi Coastal Classic	W 87–57	2–2	Chiles Center (1,541); Portland, OR
11/24/2015*; 7:00 pm	Alcorn State; Corpus Christi Coastal Classic	W 97–65	3–2	Chiles Center (1,194); Portland, OR
11/27/2015*; 5:30 pm, CBSSN	vs. Colorado State; Corpus Christi Coastal Classic semifinals	L 74–90	3–3	American Bank Center (183); Corpus Christi, TX
11/28/2015*; 4:30 pm, CBSSN	vs. Southern Illinois; Corpus Christi Coastal Classic 3rd place game	L 79–80	3–4	American Bank Center (179); Corpus Christi, TX
12/02/2015*; 7:00 pm	at Portland State	W 78–72	4–4	Peter Stott Center (785); Portland, OR
12/05/2015*; 7:00 pm, TheW.tv	Boise State	L 71–81	4–5	Chiles Center (2,282); Portland, OR
12/08/2015*; 7:00 pm, TheW.tv	Idaho State	L 65–66	4–6	Chiles Center (1,089); Portland, OR
12/12/2015*; 7:00 pm, TheW.tv	Sacramento State	W 81–73	5–6	Chiles Center (1,264); Portland, OR
12/18/2015*; 5:30 pm	vs. Weber State; Far West Classic	L 82–92	5–7	Moda Center (3,036); Portland, OR
12/19/2015*; 5:30 pm	vs. Cal State Fullerton; Far West Classic	W 65–60	6–7	Moda Center (4,371); Portland, OR
WCC regular season
12/21/2015; 6:00 pm, RTNW	Loyola Marymount	W 87–60	7–7 (1–0)	Chiles Center (1,286); Portland, OR
12/23/2015; 6:00 pm, ESPNU	Pepperdine	W 87–79	8–7 (2–0)	Chiles Center (1,659); Portland, OR
12/31/2015; 7:00 pm, TheW.tv	at San Francisco	L 95–107	8–8 (2–1)	War Memorial Gymnasium (1,170); San Francisco, CA
01/02/2016; 1:00 pm, RTNW	at Santa Clara	L 77–84	8–9 (2–2)	Leavey Center (1,365); Santa Clara, CA
01/09/2016; 5:00 pm, RTNW	at Gonzaga	L 74–85	8–10 (2–3)	McCarthey Athletic Center (6,000); Spokane, WA
01/14/2016; 7:00 pm, RTNW	San Diego	L 71–82	8–11 (2–4)	Chiles Center (1,592); Portland, OR
01/16/2016; 3:00 pm, RTNW	BYU	W 84–81	9–11 (3–4)	Chiles Center (4,852); Portland, OR
01/21/2016; 7:00 pm, TheW.tv	at Pacific	L 61–70	9–12 (3–5)	Alex G. Spanos Center (2,502); Stockton, CA
01/23/2016; 8:00 pm, RTNW	at Saint Mary's	L 74–89	9–13 (3–6)	McKeon Pavilion (3,338); Moraga, CA
01/28/2016; 7:00 pm, CSNNW	San Francisco	L 76–87	9–14 (3–7)	Chiles Center (1,471); Portland, OR
01/30/2016; 7:00 pm, TheW.tv	Santa Clara	L 84–90	9–15 (3–8)	Chiles Center (2,242); Portland, OR
02/04/2016; 8:00 pm, ESPNU	at Pepperdine	W 73–70	10–15 (4–8)	Firestone Fieldhouse (1,021); Malibu, CA
02/06/2016; 3:00 pm, TheW.tv	at Loyola Marymount	W 92–78	11–15 (5–8)	Gersten Pavilion (1,852); Los Angeles, CA
02/11/2016; 8:00 pm, ESPNU	Gonzaga	L 66–92	11–16 (5–9)	Chiles Center (4,852); Portland, OR
02/18/2016; 7:00 pm, TheW.tv	Saint Mary's	L 72–74	11–17 (5–10)	Chiles Center (2,868); Portland, OR
02/20/2016; 7:00 pm, RTNW	Pacific	W 80–67	12–17 (6–10)	Chiles Center (3,103); Portland, OR
02/25/2016; 8:00 pm, ESPNU	at BYU	L 81–99	12–18 (6–11)	Marriott Center (13,497); Provo, UT
02/27/2016; 6:00 pm, RTNW	at San Diego	L 76–85	12–19 (6–12)	Jenny Craig Pavilion (1,942); San Diego, CA
WCC tournament
03/05/2016; 9:00 pm, ESPN2	vs. Gonzaga; Quarterfinals	L 67–92	12–20	Orleans Arena (7,209); Paradise, NV
*Non-conference game. ^{#}Rankings from AP Poll. (#) Tournament seedings in parentheses. All times are in Pacific Time.

Source: Schedule

== See also ==
- 2015–16 Portland Pilots women's basketball team
