= 2015–16 Pepperdine Waves men's basketball team =

American college basketball season

2015–16 Pepperdine Waves men's basketball
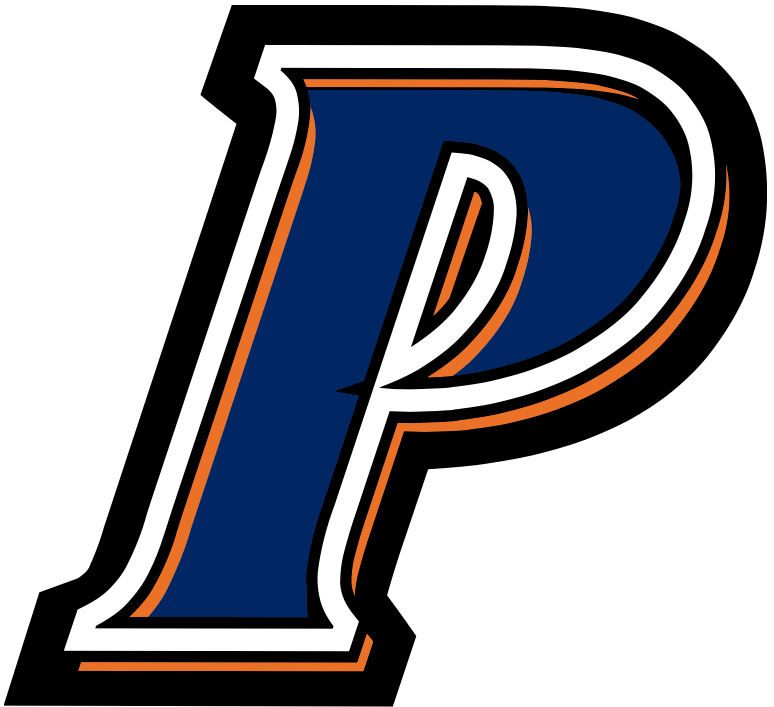

CBI, First round
- Conference: West Coast Conference
- Record: 18–14 (10–8 WCC)
- Head coach: Marty Wilson (5th season)
- Assistant coaches: Mark Amaral; Bryant Moore; John Impelman
- Home arena: Firestone Fieldhouse

2015–16 West Coast Conference men's basketball standings
	Conf.				Overall
Team	W		L	PCT	W		L	PCT
Saint Mary's	15	–	3	.833	29	–	6	.829
Gonzaga †	15	–	3	.833	28	–	8	.778
BYU	13	–	5	.722	26	–	11	.703
Pepperdine	10	–	8	.556	18	–	14	.563
San Francisco	8	–	10	.444	15	–	15	.500
Santa Clara	7	–	11	.389	11	–	20	.355
Portland	6	–	12	.333	12	–	20	.375
Loyola Marymount	6	–	12	.333	14	–	17	.452
Pacific*	6	–	12	.333	8	–	20	.286
San Diego	4	–	14	.222	9	–	21	.300
† Conference tournament winner *ineligible for postseason due to self probation

The 2015–16 Pepperdine Waves men's basketball team represented Pepperdine University during the 2015–16 NCAA Division I men's basketball season. This was head coach Marty Wilson's fifth full season at Pepperdine. The Waves played their home games at the Firestone Fieldhouse and were members of the West Coast Conference. They finished the season 18–14, 10–8 in WCC play to finish in fourth place. They defeated San Francisco in the WCC tournament to advance to the semifinals where they lost to Saint Mary's. They were invited to the College Basketball Invitational where they lost in the first round to Eastern Washington.

== Previous season ==
The Waves finished the season 18–14, 10–8 in WCC play to finish in fourth place. They advanced to the quarterfinals of the WCC tournament where they lost to Gonzaga. They were invited to the College Basketball Invitational where they lost in the first round to Seattle.

== Departures ==
Name	Number	Pos.	Height	Weight	Year	Hometown	Notes
Marley Biyendolo	1	G	6'3"	180	RS Freshman	Dingley Village, Australia	Transferred to Southwest Baptist
David Jesperson	12	F	6'8"	210	Sophomore	Merrill, WI	Transferred to Green Bay

== Recruiting Class of 2015 ==
College recruiting information
Name	Hometown	School	Height	Weight	Commit date
Kameron Edwards; F	Fontana, Ca	Etiwanda High School	6 ft 6 in (1.98 m)	210 lb (95 kg)	Sep 13, 2014
Kameron Edwards; F	Recruit ratings: Scout: Rivals: (68)				
Overall recruit ranking: Scout: nr Rivals: nr ESPN: nr
Note: In many cases, Scout, Rivals, 247Sports, On3, and ESPN may conflict in their listings of height and weight.; In these cases, the average was taken. ESPN grades are on a 100-point scale.; Sources: "Pepperdine Waves 2015 Basketball Commitments". Rivals.; "2015 Pepperdine Waves Basketball Commits". Scout.; "ESPN 2015 Pepperdine Waves Basketball recruits". ESPN.; "Scout.com Team Recruiting Rankings". Scout.; "2015 Team Ranking". Rivals.

== Roster ==
2015–16 Pepperdine Waves men's basketball team
Players
Coaches

Pos.	#	Name	Height	Weight	Year	Previous school	Hometown
G	0	Amadi Udenyi	6 ft 0 in (1.83 m)	195 lb (88 kg)	Jr	De La Salle HS; St. Thomas More	Oakland, CA
G	2	John Yi (W)	5 ft 9 in (1.75 m)	160 lb (73 kg)	So	El Dorado HS	Yorba Linda, CA
G	3	Jeremy Major	5 ft 10 in (1.78 m)	175 lb (79 kg)	Jr	Maranatha	Pasadena, CA
F	5	Stacy Davis	6 ft 6 in (1.98 m)	235 lb (107 kg)	Sr	Laveen Betty Fairfax	Laveen, AZ
G	10	Jamani Spencer (W)	6 ft 0 in (1.83 m)	180 lb (82 kg)	Fr	Sierra Canyon School; Brewster Academy	Porter Ranch, CA
G/F	11	Atif Russell	6 ft 5 in (1.96 m)	210 lb (95 kg)	Sr	Seven Lakes	Katy, TX
C	12	Nate Gehring	6 ft 10 in (2.08 m)	225 lb (102 kg)	So	Waukee HS	Waukee, IA
F	13	Kameron Edwards	6 ft 6 in (1.98 m)	215 lb (98 kg)	Fr	Etiwanda HS	Rancho Cucamonga, CA
G	20	A. J. Lapray	6 ft 5 in (1.96 m)	190 lb (86 kg)	RS So	Sprague HS; Oregon	Salem, OR
G	22	Shawn Olden	6 ft 3 in (1.91 m)	175 lb (79 kg)	So	Union HS	Tulsa, OK
G	23	Jonathan Allen (W)	6 ft 2 in (1.88 m)	200 lb (91 kg)	Jr	Ravenwood HS	Nashville, TN
F	24	Hakeem Anchrum (W)	6 ft 6 in (1.98 m)	225 lb (102 kg)	Fr	Wheeler HS	Birmingham, AL
F	25	A. J. John	6 ft 8 in (2.03 m)	225 lb (102 kg)	So	Maria Carrillo HS	Santa Rosa, CA
G/F	30	Lamond Murray Jr.	6 ft 5 in (1.96 m)	200 lb (91 kg)	Jr	Bishop Montgomery	Torrance, CA
F/C	34	Jake Johnson (W)	6 ft 10 in (2.08 m)	220 lb (100 kg)	Sr	Reno HS; Casper College	Reno, NV
C	44	Ryan Kennan	6 ft 10 in (2.08 m)	240 lb (109 kg)	RS Fr	East Ridge HS	Woodbury, MN
F	45	Jett Raines	6 ft 7 in (2.01 m)	225 lb (102 kg)	Sr	Coppell	Coppell, TX

Head coach

- Marty Wilson (Pepperdine)

Assistant coach(es)

- Marak Amaral (College of Idaho)
- Bryant Moore (Texas Tech)
- John Impelman (Occidental)

Legend

- (C) Team captain
- (S) Suspended
- (I) Ineligible
- (W) Walk-on
- Injured
- Current redshirt

Roster

== Schedule and results ==
Date time, TV	Opponent	Result	Record	Site (attendance) city, state
Non conference regular season
November 13, 2015*; 7:00 pm	at Fresno State	L 66–69	0–1	Save Mart Center (7,827); Fresno, CA
November 16, 2015*; 7:00 pm, TheW.tv	San Diego Christian	W 91–49	1–1	Firestone Fieldhouse (989); Malibu, CA
November 19, 2015*; 7:30 pm, P12N	at UCLA	L 67–81	1–2	Pauley Pavilion (6,063); Los Angeles, CA
November 23, 2015*; 11:30 am	vs. Duquesne; Gulf Coast Showcase quarterfinals	W 84–70	2–2	Germain Arena (523); Estero, FL
November 24, 2015*; 3:00 pm	vs. Murray State; Gulf Coast Showcase semifinals	L 55–59	2–3	Germain Arena (823); Estero, FL
November 25, 2015*; 1:00 pm	vs. Drake; Gulf Coast Showcase 3rd place game	L 53–69	2–4	Germain Arena (1,077); Estero, FL
November 29, 2015*; 3:30 pm, TheW.tv	Montana	W 69–63	3–4	Firestone Fieldhouse (1,154); Malibu, CA
December 5, 2015*; 7:00 pm	at Cal State Northridge	W 70–55	4–4	Matadome (1,078); Northridge, CA
December 9, 2015*; 7:00 pm, TheW.tv	Long Beach State	W 77–75	5–4	Firestone Fieldhouse (1,349); Malibu, CA
December 12, 2015*; 10:00 am, ESPN3	at Ball State	W 72–63	6–4	Worthen Arena (2,816); Muncie, IN
December 18, 2015*; 7:00 pm, TheW.tv	Louisiana–Lafayette	W 79–59	7–4	Firestone Fieldhouse (1,022); Malibu, CA
WCC regular season
December 21, 2015; 6:00 pm, ESPN2	at Gonzaga	L 73–99	7–5 (0–1)	McCarthey Athletic Center (6,000); Spokane, WA
December 23, 2015; 6:00 pm, ESPNU	at Portland	L 79–87	7–6 (0–2)	Chiles Center (1,659); Portland, OR
January 2, 2016; 5:00 pm, TWCSN	Loyola Marymount	W 68–65 ^{OT}	8–6 (1–2)	Firestone Fieldhouse (1,516); Malibu, CA
January 7, 2016; 7:00 pm, TheW.tv	Pacific	W 81–76	9–6 (2–2)	Firestone Fieldhouse (1,289); Malibu, CA
January 9, 2016; 1:00 pm, TWCSN	Saint Mary's	W 67–64	10–6 (3–2)	Firestone Fieldhouse (1,423); Malibu, CA
January 14, 2016; 7:00 pm, TheW.tv	at Santa Clara	L 60–62	10–7 (3–3)	Leavey Center (1,394); Santa Clara, CA
January 16, 2016; 1:00 pm, TWCSN	at San Francisco	W 98–84	11–7 (4–3)	War Memorial Gymnasium (1,378); San Francisco, CA
January 21, 2016; 6:00 pm, TWCSN	San Diego	W 76–58	12–7 (5–3)	Firestone Fieldhouse (1,030); Malibu, CA
January 23, 2016; 5:00 pm, BYUtv	BYU	W 71–65	13–7 (6–3)	Firestone Fieldhouse (3,019); Malibu, CA
January 28, 2016; 7:30 pm, TWCSN	at San Diego	W 75–65	14–7 (7–3)	Jenny Craig Pavilion (1,593); San Diego, CA
January 30, 2016; 7:00 pm, ESPN2	at BYU	L 77–88	14–8 (7–4)	Marriott Center (18,987); Provo, UT
February 4, 2016; 8:00 pm, ESPNU	Portland	L 70–73	14–9 (7–5)	Firestone Fieldhouse (1,021); Malibu, CA
February 6, 2016; 9:00 pm, ESPN2	Gonzaga	L 66–69	14–10 (7–6)	Firestone Fieldhouse (3,210); Malibu, CA
February 11, 2016; 8:00 pm, CSNBA	at Saint Mary's	W 69–63	15–10 (8–6)	McKeon Pavilion (3,340); Moraga, CA
February 13, 2016; 7:00 pm, TheW.tv	at Pacific	W 65–63 ^{OT}	16–10 (9–6)	Alex G. Spanos Center (2,626); Stockton, CA
February 18, 2016; 7:00 pm, TWCSN	San Francisco	L 72–82	16–11 (9–7)	Firestone Fieldhouse (1,449); Malibu, CA
February 20, 2016; 5:00 pm, TWCSN	Santa Clara	W 88–76	17–11 (10–7)	Firestone Fieldhouse (1,977); Malibu, CA
February 27, 2016; 1:00 pm, TWCSN	at Loyola Marymount	L 83–90 ^{2OT}	17–12 (10–8)	Gersten Pavilion (2,041); Los Angeles, CA
WCC tournament
March 5, 2016; 3:00 pm, BYUtv/CSNCA/TWCSN	vs. San Francisco; Quarterfinals	W 90–86	18–12	Orleans Arena (7,341); Paradise, NV
March 7, 2016; 6:00 pm, ESPN	vs. Saint Mary's; Semifinals	L 66–81	18–13	Orleans Arena (8,362); Paradise, NV
College Basketball Invitational
March 16, 2016*; 6:00 pm	at Eastern Washington; First round	L 72–79	18–14	Reese Court (1,518); Cheney, WA
*Non-conference game. ^{#}Rankings from AP Poll. (#) Tournament seedings in parentheses. All times are in Pacific Time.
