= 2015–16 San Francisco Dons men's basketball team =

American college basketball season

2015–16 San Francisco Dons men's basketball
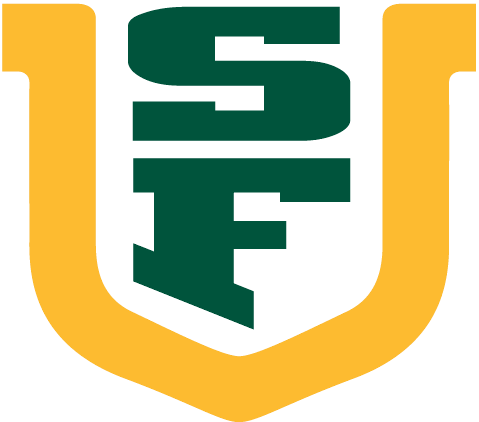
- Conference: West Coast Conference
- Record: 15–15 (8–10 WCC)
- Head coach: Rex Walters (8th season)
- Assistant coaches: Luke Wicks; Brent Crews; David Rebibo
- Home arena: War Memorial Gymnasium

2015–16 West Coast Conference men's basketball standings
	Conf.				Overall
Team	W		L	PCT	W		L	PCT
Saint Mary's	15	–	3	.833	29	–	6	.829
Gonzaga †	15	–	3	.833	28	–	8	.778
BYU	13	–	5	.722	26	–	11	.703
Pepperdine	10	–	8	.556	18	–	14	.563
San Francisco	8	–	10	.444	15	–	15	.500
Santa Clara	7	–	11	.389	11	–	20	.355
Portland	6	–	12	.333	12	–	20	.375
Loyola Marymount	6	–	12	.333	14	–	17	.452
Pacific*	6	–	12	.333	8	–	20	.286
San Diego	4	–	14	.222	9	–	21	.300
† Conference tournament winner *ineligible for postseason due to self probation

The 2015–16 San Francisco Dons men's basketball team represented the University of San Francisco during the 2015–16 NCAA Division I men's basketball season. It was head coach Rex Walters eighth season at San Francisco. The Dons played their home games at the War Memorial Gymnasium and were members of the West Coast Conference. They finished the season 15–15, 8–10 in WCC play to finish in fifth place. They lost in the quarterfinals of the WCC tournament to Pepperdine.

On March 9, 2016, head coach Rex Walters was fired. He finished at San Francisco with an eight-year record of 126–125. On March 30, the school hired Kyle Smith as head coach.

== Previous season ==
The Dons finished the season 14–18, 7–11 in WCC play to finish in a three-way tie for sixth place. They advanced to the quarterfinals of the WCC tournament where they lost to Gonzaga.

== Departures ==
Name	Number	Pos.	Height	Weight	Year	Hometown	Notes
Matt Christiansen	3	F	6'9"	235	Junior	Oklahoma City, OK	Left the team for personal reasons
Matt Glover	5	G	6'5"	212	RS Senior	Orange, CA	Graduated
Chris Adams	10	G	6'4"	194	Senior	Covina, CA	Graduated
Gavin Hoffmann	11	G	6'5"	204	Senior	Portland, OR	Graduated
Frankie Ferrari	13	G	5'11"	160	Freshman	Burlingame, CA	Transferred to Cañada College
David Irby	14	G	6'0"	180	Sophomore	Long Beach, CA	Left the team for personal reasons
Kruize Pinkins	15	F	6'7"	230	Senior	Marianna, FL	Graduated
Mark Tollefsen	23	F	6'2"	199	RS Junior	Danville, CA	Elected to transfer from the team to Arizona for the final year on his eligibility.
Darrell Robertson	25	C	6'10"	242	RS Junior	Pinola, MS	Graduated
Dominique Williams	30	G	6'2"	170	Sophomore	El Granada, CA	Did not return
Nick Loew	33	F	6'8"	230	Freshman	Burlingame, CA	Left the team for personal reasons

=== Incoming transfers ===
Name	Number	Pos.	Height	Weight	Year	Hometown	Previous School
Donte Reynolds	0	F	6'8"	215	Junior	Kinston, NC	Junior college transferred from Odessa College
Ronnie Boyce III	3	G	6'4"		Junior	Oklahoma City, OK	Junior college transferred from Connors State College
Sean Grennan	30	G	6'3"	175	RS Senior	Toms River, NJ	Transferred from Fairfield. Will be eligible to play immediately since Grennan graduated from Fairfield.

== Recruiting Class of 2015 ==
College recruiting information
Name	Hometown	School	Height	Weight	Commit date
Cedric Wright; SF	Fort Lauderdale, FL	Dillard High School	6 ft 6 in (1.98 m)	N/A	Jul 2, 2014
Cedric Wright; SF	Recruit ratings: Scout: Rivals: (NR)				
Marquill Smith; SG	Miami, FL	Miami Christian School	6 ft 4 in (1.93 m)	N/A	Mar 12, 2015
Marquill Smith; SG	Recruit ratings: Scout: Rivals: (NR)				
Matt McCarthy; PF	Melbourne, Australia	Xavier College	6 ft 9 in (2.06 m)	221 lb (100 kg)	Apr 7, 2015
Matt McCarthy; PF	Recruit ratings: Scout: Rivals: (NR)				
Overall recruit ranking: Scout: nr Rivals: nr ESPN: nr
Note: In many cases, Scout, Rivals, 247Sports, On3, and ESPN may conflict in their listings of height and weight.; In these cases, the average was taken. ESPN grades are on a 100-point scale.; Sources: "San Francisco Dons 2015 Basketball Commitments". Rivals.; "2015 San Francisco Dons Basketball Commits". Scout.; "ESPN". ESPN.; "Scout.com Team Recruiting Rankings". Scout.; "2015 Team Ranking". Rivals.

== Roster ==
2015–16 San Francisco Dons men's basketball team
Players
Coaches

Pos.	#	Name	Height	Weight	Year	Previous school	Hometown
F	0	Montray Clemsons	6 ft 7 in (2.01 m)	235 lb (107 kg)	Sr	Baltimore Poly Ins; Pensacola State College	Baltimore, MD
G	1	Devin Watson	6 ft 1 in (1.85 m)	165 lb (75 kg)	So	El Camino	Oceanside, CA
F	2	Uche Ofoegbu	6 ft 4 in (1.93 m)	214 lb (97 kg)	RS Jr	John Paul Stevens; SMU	San Antonio, TX
G	3	Ronnie Boyce	6 ft 3 in (1.91 m)	170 lb (77 kg)	Jr	Putnam City; Connors College	Oklahoma City, OK
F	5	Cedric Wright	6 ft 6 in (1.98 m)	210 lb (95 kg)	Fr	Dillard	Fort Lauderdale, FL
F	10	Matt McCarthy	6 ft 9 in (2.06 m)	220 lb (100 kg)	Fr	Xavier College	Melbourne, Australia
G	11	Maquill Smith	6 ft 4 in (1.93 m)	170 lb (77 kg)	Fr	Miami Christian	Miami, FL
F	13	Dont'e Reynolds	6 ft 8 in (2.03 m)	215 lb (98 kg)	Jr	Word of God Christian; Odessa College	Miami, FL
G	14	Stefan Cox (W)	6 ft 2 in (1.88 m)	180 lb (82 kg)	Fr	Sacred Heart	Sedalia, MO
F	15	Nate Renfro	6 ft 7 in (2.01 m)	175 lb (79 kg)	Fr	Sahuaro	Tucson, AZ
F	22	Chase Foster	6 ft 5 in (1.96 m)	170 lb (77 kg)	So	Valor Christian	Highlands Ranch, CO
F	23	Stokley Chaffee (W)	6 ft 5 in (1.96 m)	200 lb (91 kg)	Fr	Amador Valley	Pleasanton, CA
G	30	Sean Grennan	6 ft 3 in (1.91 m)	175 lb (79 kg)	RS Sr	Monsignor Donovan; Seton Hall/Fairfield	Sea Girt, NJ
G	32	Tim Derksen	6 ft 3 in (1.91 m)	202 lb (92 kg)	Sr	Amphitheater	Tucson, AZ
G	45	Mladen Djordjevic	6 ft 3 in (1.91 m)	200 lb (91 kg)	Fr	Tamiš Club	Belgrade, Serbia

Head coach

- Rex Walters (Kansas)

Assistant coach(es)

- Luke Wicks (Northern State)
- Brent Crews (Florida Atlantic)
- David Rebibo (Cal State Northridge)

Legend

- (C) Team captain
- (S) Suspended
- (I) Ineligible
- (W) Walk-on
- Injured
- Current redshirt

Roster

== Schedule and results ==
Date time, TV	Opponent	Result	Record	Site (attendance) city, state
Exhibition
11/06/2015*; 7:00 pm	San Francisco State	W 87–76		War Memorial Gymnasium; San Francisco, CA
Regular season
11/13/2015*; 5:00 pm, ESPN3	at UIC	W 78–75	1–0	UIC Pavilion (4,033); Chicago, IL
11/16/2015*; 7:00 pm, TheW.tv	Rice; Roundball Showcase	W 80–54	2–0	War Memorial Gymnasium (1,417); San Francisco, CA
11/19/2015*; 7:00 pm, TheW.tv	at Fresno State; Roundball Showcase	L 71–78	2–1	Save Mart Center (5,327); Fresno, CA
11/21/2015*; 7:00 pm, TheW.tv	UC Riverside; Roundball Showcase	W 58–57	3–1	War Memorial Gymnasium (1,641); San Francisco, CA
11/25/2015*; 7:30 pm, TheW.tv	UC Santa Barbara	L 61–68	3–2	War Memorial Gymnasium (1,452); San Francisco, CA
11/29/2015*; 3:00 pm, TheW.tv	Delaware State; Roundball Showcase	W 67–47	4–2	War Memorial Gymnasium (1,148); San Francisco, CA
12/01/2015*; 7:00 pm, TheW.tv	Eastern Washington	L 77–81	4–3	War Memorial Gymnasium (1,484); San Francisco, CA
12/04/2015*; 6:00 pm	at Montana	L 50–82	4–4	Dahlberg Arena (3,279); Missoula, MT
12/07/2015*; 7:00 pm, TheW.tv	Cal State Northridge	W 65–61	5–4	War Memorial Gymnasium (1,138); San Francisco, CA
12/18/2015*; 7:00 pm, TheW.tv	Coppin State	W 96–93 ^{OT}	6–4	War Memorial Gymnasium (1,142); San Francisco, CA
12/21/2015; 8:00 pm, CSNCA	at Saint Mary's	L 52–74	6-5 (0–1)	McKeon Pavilion (2,408); Moraga, CA
12/23/2015; 7:00 pm, TheW.tv	Pacific	W 89–76	7–5 (1–1)	War Memorial Gymnasium (1,382); San Francisco, CA
12/31/2015; 5:00 pm, TheW.tv	Portland	W 107–95	8–5 (2–1)	War Memorial Gymnasium (1,170); San Francisco, CA
01/02/2016; 8:00 pm, ESPN2	Gonzaga	L 94–102 ^{OT}	8–6 (2–2)	War Memorial Gymnasium (3,253); San Francisco, CA
01/07/2016; 7:00 pm, CSNBA	at San Diego	W 73–65	9–6 (3–2)	Jenny Craig Pavilion (2,102); San Diego, CA
01/09/2016; 6:00 pm, BYUtv	at BYU	L 92–102	9–7 (3–3)	Marriott Center (16,616); Provo, UT
01/14/2016; 7:00 pm, TheW.tv	Loyola Marymount	L 83–87	9–8 (3–4)	War Memorial Gymnasium (1,138); San Francisco, CA
01/16/2016; 1:00 pm, CSNCA	Pepperdine	L 84–98	9–9 (3–5)	War Memorial Gymnasium (1,378); San Francisco, CA
01/21/2016; 8:00 pm, CSNBA	at Santa Clara	W 74–61	10–9 (4–5)	Leavey Center (1,413); Santa Clara, CA
01/28/2015; 7:00 pm, TheW.tv	at Portland	W 87–76	11–9 (5–5)	Chiles Center (1,471); Portland, OR
01/30/2016; 5:00 pm, CSNBA/CSNCA	at Gonzaga	L 48–86	11–10 (5–6)	McCarthey Athletic Center (6,000); Spokane, WA
02/02/2016*; 7:00 pm, TheW.tv	Menlo	W 100–68	12–10	War Memorial Gymnasium (1,094); San Francisco, CA
02/06/2016; 8:00 pm, CSNCA	Santa Clara	W 89–86	13–10 (6–6)	War Memorial Gymnasium (1,538); San Francisco, CA
02/11/2016; 7:00 pm, BYUtv	BYU	L 89–114	13–11 (6–7)	War Memorial Gymnasium (1,420); San Francisco, CA
02/13/2016; 3:00 pm, CSNCA	San Diego	W 68–51	14–11 (7–7)	War Memorial Gymnasium (1,358); San Francisco, CA
02/18/2016; 7:00 pm, CSNBA/CSNBA+	at Pepperdine	W 82–72	15–11 (8–7)	Firestone Fieldhouse (1,449); Malibu, CA
02/20/2016; 1:00 pm, CSNCA	at Loyola Marymount	L 87–100 ^{OT}	15–12 (8–8)	Gersten Pavilion (3,407); Los Angeles, CA
02/25/2016; 7:00 pm, TheW.tv	at Pacific	L 70–79	15–13 (8–9)	Alex G. Spanos Center (2,381); Stockton, CA
02/27/2016; 8:00 pm, CSNCA	Saint Mary's	L 72–84	15–14 (8–10)	War Memorial Gymnasium (2,769); San Francisco, CA
WCC tournament
03/05/2016; 3:00 pm, BYUtv/CSNCA/TWCSN	vs. Pepperdine; Quarterfinals	L 86–90	15–15	Orleans Arena (7,341); Paradise, NV
*Non-conference game. ^{#}Rankings from AP Poll. (#) Tournament seedings in parentheses. All times are in Pacific Time.
