= 2015–16 Loyola Marymount Lions men's basketball team =

American college basketball season

2015–16 Loyola Marymount Lions men's basketball
- Conference: West Coast Conference
- Record: 14–17 (6–12 WCC)
- Head coach: Mike Dunlap (2nd season)
- Assistant coaches: John Peterson Jr.; Ray Johnson; Patrick Sandle
- Home arena: Gersten Pavilion

2015–16 West Coast Conference men's basketball standings
	Conf.				Overall
Team	W		L	PCT	W		L	PCT
Saint Mary's	15	–	3	.833	29	–	6	.829
Gonzaga †	15	–	3	.833	28	–	8	.778
BYU	13	–	5	.722	26	–	11	.703
Pepperdine	10	–	8	.556	18	–	14	.563
San Francisco	8	–	10	.444	15	–	15	.500
Santa Clara	7	–	11	.389	11	–	20	.355
Portland	6	–	12	.333	12	–	20	.375
Loyola Marymount	6	–	12	.333	14	–	17	.452
Pacific*	6	–	12	.333	8	–	20	.286
San Diego	4	–	14	.222	9	–	21	.300
† Conference tournament winner *ineligible for postseason due to self probation

The 2015–16 Loyola Marymount Lions men's basketball team represented Loyola Marymount University during the 2015–16 NCAA Division I men's basketball season. The Lions were led by second year head coach Mike Dunlap. The Lions competed in the West Coast Conference and played their home games at Gersten Pavilion. They finished the season 14–17, 6–12 in WCC play to finish in a three way tie for seventh place. They defeated San Diego in the first round of the WCC tournament to advance to the quarterfinals where they lost to Saint Mary's.

== Previous season ==
The Lions finished the season 8–23, 4–14 in WCC play to finish in a tie for ninth place. They lost in the first round of the WCC tournament to Santa Clara.

== Departures ==
Name	Number	Pos.	Height	Weight	Year	Hometown	Notes
Evan Payne	1	G	6'1"	195	Sophomore	Cuyahoga Falls, OH	Transferred to Long Beach State
Simon Krajcovic	5	G	6'3"	185	Freshman	Považská Bystrica, Slovakia	Transferred to College of the Sequoias
Patson Siame	14	F	6'11"	225	Sophomore	Zambia, Africa	Transferred to Florida Gulf Coast
Devin Wyatt	20	F	6'7"	195	Freshman	DeSoto, TX	Transferred to New Mexico Junior College
Godwin Okonji	22	F	6'8"	220	RS Senior	Lagos, Nigeria	Graduated
Chase Flint	23	G	6'1"	180	Senior	Kaysville, UT	Graduated
Ayodeji Egbeyemi	24	G	6'4"	210	RS Senior	Fort Washington, MD	Graduated

=== Incoming transfers ===
Name	Number	Pos.	Height	Weight	Year	Hometown	Notes
Adom Jacko	4	F	6'8"	210	Junior	Upland, CA	Junior college transferred from Chaffey College
Matt Hayes	5	G	6'0"	170	Junior	Elk Grove, CA	Junior college transferred from Santa Rosa Junior College
Brandon Brown	10	G	5'11"	165	Junior	Laveen, AZ	Junior college transferred from Phoenix College
Shamar Johnson	24	F	6'6"	260	Junior	Pensacola, FL	Junior college transferred from Pensacola State College

== Recruits ==
College recruiting information
Name	Hometown	School	Height	Weight	Commit date
Jeffrey McClendon; SG	Palmdale, CA	Eastside High School	6 ft 2 in (1.88 m)	185 lb (84 kg)	Mar 21, 2015
Jeffrey McClendon; SG	Recruit ratings: Scout: Rivals: (59)				
Munis Tutu; PG	Windsor, ON	La Lumiere School	6 ft 0 in (1.83 m)	165 lb (75 kg)	Mar 5, 2015
Munis Tutu; PG	Recruit ratings: Scout: Rivals: (NR)				
Overall recruit ranking: Scout: nr Rivals: nr ESPN: nr
Note: In many cases, Scout, Rivals, 247Sports, On3, and ESPN may conflict in their listings of height and weight.; In these cases, the average was taken. ESPN grades are on a 100-point scale.; Sources: "Loyola Marymount Lions 2015 Basketball Commitments". Rivals.; "2015 Loyola Marymount Lions Basketball Commits". Scout.; "ESPN 2015 Loyola Marymount Lions Basketball recruits". ESPN.; "Scout.com Team Recruiting Rankings". Scout.; "2015 Team Ranking". Rivals.

== Roster ==
2015–16 Loyola Marymount Lions men's basketball team
Players
Coaches

Pos.	#	Name	Height	Weight	Year	Previous school	Hometown
F	2	Joshua Spiers	6 ft 7 in (2.01 m)	205 lb (93 kg)	So	Townsville Heat	Queensland, Australia
G	3	Munis Tutu	6 ft 1 in (1.85 m)	160 lb (73 kg)	Fr	La Lumiere School	Winsdor, ON
F	4	Adom Jacko	6 ft 8 in (2.03 m)	225 lb (102 kg)	Jr	Alta Loma HS; Chaffey College	Upland, CA
G	5	Matt Hayes	6 ft 1 in (1.85 m)	170 lb (77 kg)	Jr	Pleasant Grove HS; Santa Rosa JC	Elk Grove, CA
G	10	Brandon Brown	5 ft 11 in (1.8 m)	155 lb (70 kg)	Jr	César Chávez HS; Phoenix College	Laveen, AZ
F	11	Petr Herman	6 ft 10 in (2.08 m)	240 lb (109 kg)	So	Canarias Academy	Central Bohemian Region, Czech Republic
F	12	Steven Haney	6 ft 5 in (1.96 m)	195 lb (88 kg)	RS So	St. Aquinas HS; Central Florida	Fort Lauderdale, FL
G	13	Miles Crawford (W)	6 ft 1 in (1.85 m)	165 lb (75 kg)	Fr	Elev8 Sports Inst	Denton, TX
G	22	Buay Tuach	6 ft 6 in (1.98 m)	180 lb (82 kg)	Jr	South HS; Northeast CC	Omaha, NE
F	24	Shamar Johnson	6 ft 7 in (2.01 m)	250 lb (113 kg)	Jr	Pine Forest HS; Pensacola State College	Pensacola, FL
G	25	Jeffery McClendon	6 ft 1 in (1.85 m)	200 lb (91 kg)	Fr	Eastside HS	Lancaster, CA
G	33	Tyler Baptiste (W)	5 ft 11 in (1.8 m)	175 lb (79 kg)	So	Westchester HS	Los Angeles, CA
F	42	Marin Mornar	6 ft 9 in (2.06 m)	205 lb (93 kg)	Sr	Consortium College Prep (Detroit)	Zagreb, Croatia
G	45	David Humphries	6 ft 4 in (1.93 m)	210 lb (95 kg)	Sr	Northern Iowa Area CC	Adelaide, Australia

Head coach

- Mike Dunlap (Loyola Marymount)

Assistant coach(es)

- John Peterson Jr. (San Francisco)
- Patrick Sandle (San Francisco State)
- Ray Johnson (California)

Legend

- (C) Team captain
- (S) Suspended
- (I) Ineligible
- (W) Walk-on
- Injured
- Current redshirt

Roster

== Schedule and results ==
Date time, TV	Opponent	Result	Record	Site (attendance) city, state
Exhibition
11/08/2015*; 5:00 pm	Cal State Dominguez Hill	W 92–58		Gersten Pavilion (1,421); Los Angeles, CA
Non-conference regular season
11/13/2015*; 7:00 pm, TheW.tv	Cal State Fullerton	W 79–74	1–0	Gersten Pavilion (2,761); Los Angeles, CA
11/15/2015*; 5:00 pm	at UC Irvine	L 53–77	1–1	Bren Events Center (2,077); Irvine, CA
11/19/2015*; 6:00 pm, MW Net	at Colorado State	L 75–83	1–2	Moby Arena (3,142); Fort Collins, CO
11/22/2015*; 3:00 pm, TheW.tv	Antelope Valley	W 86–62	2–2	Gersten Pavilion (1,422); Los Angeles, CA
11/25/2015*; 6:00 pm, TheW.tv	Cal State Northridge	W 82–80 ^{OT}	3–2	Gersten Pavilion (1,951); Los Angeles, CA
11/28/2015*; 12:00 pm	at Southeast Missouri State	W 73–60	4–2	Show Me Center (924); Cape Girardeau, MO
12/02/2015*; 7:00 pm, P12N	at Oregon State	L 70–79	4–3	Gill Coliseum (4,576); Corvallis, OR
12/06/2015*; 3:00 pm, TheW.tv	UC Riverside	W 77–76	5–3	Gersten Pavilion (1,817); Los Angeles, CA
12/09/2015*; 6:00 pm, MW Net	at Boise State	L 66–67	5–4	Taco Bell Arena (4,151); Boise, ID
12/12/2015*; 6:00 pm	at Cal State Fullerton	W 82–70	6–4	Titan Gym (778); Fullerton, CA
12/18/2015*; 6:00 pm, TheW.tv	Jacksonville State	W 77–60	7–4	Gersten Pavilion (778); Los Angeles, CA
WCC regular season
12/21/2015; 6:00 pm, RTNW	at Portland	L 60–87	7–5 (0–1)	Chiles Center (1,286); Portland, OR
12/23/2015; 6:00 pm, RTNW	at Gonzaga	L 62–85	7–6 (0–2)	McCarthey Athletic Center (6,000); Spokane, WA
01/02/2016; 5:00 pm, TWCSN	at Pepperdine	L 65–68 ^{OT}	7–7 (0–3)	Firestone Fieldhouse (1,516); Malibu, CA
01/07/2016; 7:00 pm, TheW.tv	Saint Mary's	L 48–73	7–8 (0–4)	Gersten Pavilion (1,791); Los Angeles, CA
01/09/2016; 3:00 pm, TWCSN	Pacific	L 58–60	7–9 (0–5)	Gersten Pavilion (1,595); Los Angeles, CA
01/14/2016; 7:00 pm, TheW.tv	at San Francisco	W 87–83	8–9 (1–5)	War Memorial Gymnasium (1,138); San Francisco, CA
01/16/2016; 8:00 pm, CSNBA	at Santa Clara	W 76–66	9–9 (2–5)	Leavey Center (1,572); Santa Clara, CA
01/21/2016; 8:00 pm, TWCSN	BYU	L 80–91	9–10 (2–6)	Gersten Pavilion (2,681); Los Angeles, CA
01/23/2016; 3:00 pm, TWCSN	San Diego; Homecoming	W 67–63	10–10 (3–6)	Gersten Pavilion (3,120); Los Angeles, CA
01/28/2016; 8:00 pm, ESPNU	at BYU	L 62–87	10–11 (3–7)	Marriott Center (12,816); Provo, UT
01/30/2016; 1:00 pm, TWCSN	at San Diego	L 69–77	10–12 (3–8)	Jenny Craig Pavilion (1,548); San Diego, CA
02/04/2016; 7:00 pm, RTNW	Gonzaga	L 63–92	10–13 (3–9)	Gersten Pavilion (3,422); Los Angeles, CA
02/06/2016; 3:00 pm, TheW.tv	Portland	L 78–92	10–14 (3–10)	Gersten Pavilion (1,852); Los Angeles, CA
02/11/2016; 7:00 pm, TheW.tv	at Pacific	W 77–72	11–14 (4–10)	Alex G. Spanos Center (2,190); Stockton, CA
02/13/2016; 8:00 pm, CSNBA	at Saint Mary's	L 62–68	11–15 (4–11)	McKeon Pavilion (3,165); Moraga, CA
02/18/2016; 7:00 pm, TheW.tv	Santa Clara	L 72–76	11–16 (4–12)	Gersten Pavilion (1,721); Los Angeles, CA
02/20/2016; 1:00 pm, TWCSN	San Francisco	W 100–87 ^{OT}	12–16 (5–12)	Gersten Pavilion (3,407); Los Angeles, CA
02/27/2016; 1:00 pm, TWCSN	Pepperdine	W 90–83 ^{2OT}	13–16 (6–12)	Gersten Pavilion (2,041); Los Angeles, CA
WCC tournament
03/04/2016; 6:00 pm, TheW.tv/BYUtv	vs. San Diego; First round	W 64–61	14–16	Orleans Arena (6,689); Paradise, NV
03/05/2016; 6:00 pm, ESPN2	vs. Saint Mary's; Quarterfinals	L 48–60	14–17	Orleans Arena (7,209); Paradise, NV
*Non-conference game. ^{#}Rankings from AP Poll. (#) Tournament seedings in parentheses.
