= Kameron Edwards =

American basketball player (born 1996)

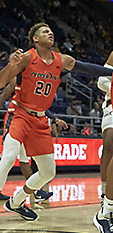

Free agent
- Position: Small forward

Personal information
- Born: November 2, 1996 (age 30) Pasadena, California, U.S.
- Listed height: 6 ft 6 in (1.98 m)
- Listed weight: 225 lb (102 kg)

Career information
- High school: Etiwanda (Rancho Cucamonga, California)
- College: Pepperdine (2015–2020)
- NBA draft: 2020: undrafted
- Playing career: 2020–present

Career history
- 2020–2021: Kangoeroes Mechelen
- 2022–2023: Agua Caliente/Ontario Clippers

Career highlights
- Second-team All-WCC (2020); WCC All-Freshmen Team (2016)

Kameron Edwards (born November 2, 1996) is an American professional basketball player and social media personality who last played for the Ontario Clippers of the NBA G League. He played college basketball for the Pepperdine Waves.

== High school career ==
Edwards attended Etiwanda High School. He suffered a broken ankle as a sophomore. Edwards became a starter as a junior and averaged 13.6 points and a team-high 7.2 rebounds for the 27–5 Eagles. As a senior, he averaged 16.6 points and 8 rebounds per game. Edwards had a season-high 36 points against Gahr High School and had 29 points against Damien High School. He was a two-time All-Inland Valley and Baseline League selection as well as a first-team All-CIF selection as a senior. Edwards committed to Pepperdine on September 15, 2014.

== College career ==
Edwards started 28 of 32 games for Pepperdine as a freshman, averaging 7.2 points and 4.2 rebounds per game, and was named to the West Coast Conference All-Freshman Team. Edwards was forced to miss the 2016–17 season with a fractured jaw. He missed five games in December 2017 with a concussion. Edwards averaged 14.7 points, 6.4 rebounds, and 1.1 assists per game as a redshirt sophomore. As a junior, Edwards finished as Pepperdine's second-leading scorer (14.7 points per game) and top rebounder (6.2 per game) despite missing several games with a foot injury. He was named Honorable Mention All-WCC. In January 2020, Edwards was named one of 30 candidates for the Senior CLASS Award. Edwards averaged 16.2 points and 7.4 rebounds per game as a senior, earning Second Team All-WCC honors. He finished his career with 1,346 points.

== Professional career ==
On May 31, 2020, Edwards signed with Kangoeroes Mechelen of the Pro Basketball League (PBL). In October 2021, he joined the Santa Cruz Warriors of the NBA G League after a successful tryout. However, he was waived on November 4.

On February 23, 2022, Edwards was acquired by the Agua Caliente Clippers of the NBA G League. He was then later waived on February 26, 2022, and then reacquired again on February 27, 2022.

On December 17, 2022, Edwards was reacquired by the Ontario Clippers but was waived on February 4, 2023.

On October 30, 2023, Edwards joined the Grand Rapids Gold, but was waived on November 7.

== Career statistics ==
Legend
GP	Games played	GS	Games started	MPG	Minutes per game
FG%	Field goal percentage	3P%	3-point field goal percentage	FT%	Free throw percentage
RPG	Rebounds per game	APG	Assists per game	SPG	Steals per game
BPG	Blocks per game	PPG	Points per game	**Bold**	Career high

=== College ===
Year	Team	GP	GS	MPG	FG%	3P%	FT%	RPG	APG	SPG	BPG	PPG
2015–16	Pepperdine	**32**	28	23.9	.440	.100	.602	4.2	**1.3**	.8	.3	7.2
2016–17	Pepperdine	Redshirt										
2017–18	Pepperdine	23	21	29.2	**.477**	**.387**	.670	6.4	1.1	.8	.3	14.7
2018–19	Pepperdine	18	14	28.6	.414	.344	**.753**	6.6	1.0	.8	.4	15.1
2019–20	Pepperdine	31	**31**	**33.0**	.452	.284	.733	**7.5**	1.0	**1.0**	**.5**	**16.4**
Career		104	94	28.6	.448	.310	.690	6.1	1.1	.9	.4	12.9

== Personal life ==
Edwards's younger brother, Kessler, played college basketball for Pepperdine and was his teammate for two seasons, and now plays professionally for Virtus Bologna. Edwards earned his master's degree in legal studies. Edwards found success on TikTok in 2024 with a series of comedic videos about how others "expect us to react" after certain actions; as of April 2025, he has 1.1 million followers and 75 million likes on TikTok.
