= Marty Wilson (basketball) =

American basketball player and coach

Biographical details
- Born: October 17, 1966 (age 60); Pacoima, California, U.S.

Playing career
- 1984–1989: Pepperdine
- Position: Point guard

Coaching career (HC unless noted)
- 1989–1990: Simi Valley HS (assistant)
- 1990–1996: Pepperdine (assistant)
- 1996: Pepperdine (interim HC)
- 1996–1998: San Diego (assistant)
- 1998–2004: UC Santa Barbara (assistant)
- 2004–2008: Utah (assistant)
- 2008–2011: Pepperdine (assoc. HC)
- 2011–2018: Pepperdine
- 2018–2023: California (assistant)

Head coaching record
- Overall: 91–139 (.396)
- Tournaments: CBI: 0–2

Lamar "Marty" Wilson (born October 17, 1966) is an American college basketball coach, who most recently served as an assistant coach at UC Berkeley. Wilson previously served as head coach at his alma mater Pepperdine University.

== Playing career ==
As a player at Pepperdine, Wilson ended his career in fifth place on the all-time assists list with 342 (he still ranks ninth). Under head coach Jim Harrick, Wilson was a backup point guard in 1984–85 and 1985–86, and the Waves advanced to the NCAA Tournament both seasons. A back injury sidelined Wilson for the entire 1986–87 campaign, but he took over as the starting point guard in 1987–88. Unfortunately, he suffered a season-ending knee injury in the 17th game of the season, though the Waves still advanced to the NIT.

Tom Asbury took over as head coach in 1988–89, and Wilson's extensive rehabilitation paid off as he returned to the starting lineup as a senior and led the Waves to a 20–13 record and the second round of the NIT. The Waves posted a record of 97–58 (.626) during his five seasons as a student-athlete.

Wilson graduated from Pepperdine in 1989 with a bachelor's degree in communications. In the year between his graduation and his return to Pepperdine as an assistant coach, Wilson tried out for the Continental Basketball Association and was an assistant coach at Simi Valley High School.

== Coaching resume ==
Marty Wilson is set on helping the program return to the triumphant days that he previously enjoyed as a player and assistant coach with the program.

After 21 seasons as an assistant coach, including nine at Pepperdine, Marty Wilson was elevated to the position of head coach of the Waves following the 2010–11 season. Wilson has compiled an impressive record in Malibu, beginning as a student athlete (1985–89) and continuing as an assistant coach (1991–96, which included a brief stint as the interim head coach) and as the associate head coach for three seasons (2009–11).

The Waves went 10–19 in his first season. Including his time as interim coach, his overall record is 13–29 in two seasons at Pepperdine.

Excluding interim coaches, Wilson is the 12th men's basketball head coach in Pepperdine history.

During his first six seasons on the Waves’ staff, which followed his graduation in 1989, Wilson helped Pepperdine to a 106–72 (.596) record. He began as the restricted-earnings coach before being elevated to full-time status for the 1994–95 season.

With Wilson on the bench, Pepperdine earned bids to the NCAA Tournament in 1991, 1992 and 1994 and made the NIT in 1993. The Waves also won West Coast Conference regular-season titles in 1991, 1992 and 1993 and WCC Tournament titles in 1991, 1992 and 1994.

Following Tom Asbury's departure for Kansas State after the 1993–94 season, Wilson remained on the staff under new head coach Tony Fuller. When Fuller resigned midway through the 1995–96 season, Wilson took over on an interim basis at the age of 28 and directed the Waves to a 3–10 record down the stretch. Most notably, that included an upset of a Steve Nash-led Santa Clara team in the first round of the WCC Tournament.

Wilson left Malibu but stayed in Southern California for the next several years, spending two seasons (1996–97 and 1997–98) as an assistant coach at San Diego, where he was also the recruiting coordinator under head coach Brad Holland.

He spent the next six seasons (1999–2004) at UC Santa Barbara, and was the top assistant for Bob Williams as the Gauchos averaged 18 wins a season during his last three years there. UCSB won the Big West Conference's West Division in 1999, captured the Big West Tournament title and advanced to the NCAA Tournament in 2002 and won the Big West regular-season title and made an appearance in the NIT in 2003.

Prior to his return to Pepperdine, Wilson was an assistant for four seasons (2005–08) at Utah under head coaches Ray Giacoletti and Jim Boylen. During his first season with Boylen, the Utes went 29–6, won the Mountain West Conference's regular-season title, advanced to the NCAA Tournament's Sweet Sixteen and finished the year ranked 18th nationally by the Associated Press.

In February 2008, Wilson returned to Pepperdine as the associate head coach and head coach in waiting following the retirement of Asbury.

After 7 seasons, Pepperdine announced that Wilson would not return as head coach effective at the end of the 2017–18 season.

On April 5, 2018, Wilson was hired by Cal as an assistant coach under Wyking Jones.

== Personal life ==
Born Lamar Wilson in Pacoima, California, Wilson is married and has two grown children.

== Head coaching record ==
Record table
Season	Team	Overall	Conference	Standing	Postseason
Pepperdine (West Coast Conference) (1995–1996)
1995–96	Pepperdine	3–10	3–10	8th	
Pepperdine (West Coast Conference) (2011–2018)
2011–12	Pepperdine	10–19	4–13	7th	
2012–13	Pepperdine	12–18	4–12	T-7th	
2013–14	Pepperdine	15–16	8–10	5th	
2014–15	Pepperdine	18–14	10–8	4th	CBI First Round
2015–16	Pepperdine	18–14	10–8	4th	CBI First Round
2016–17	Pepperdine	9–22	5–13	8th	
2017–18	Pepperdine	6–26	2–16	10th	
Pepperdine:		91–139 (.396)	46–90 (.338)		
Total:		91–139 (.396)			
National champion Postseason invitational champion Conference regular season champion Conference regular season and conference tournament champion Division regular season champion Division regular season and conference tournament champion Conference tournament champion
