= Donny Daniels =

American coach (born 1954)

Current position
- Title: Director of Player Development
- Team: Utah
- Conference: Pac-12

Biographical details
- Born: August 3, 1954 (age 72); New Orleans, Louisiana, U.S.

Playing career
- 1972–1973: Scottsdale CC
- 1973–1974: Los Angeles Harbor CC
- 1974–1976: Cal State Fullerton

Coaching career (HC unless noted)
- 1978–1980: Cal State Fullerton (asst.)
- 1980–1981: Verbum Dei HS (asst.)
- 1981–1984: Cal State Fullerton (asst.)
- 1984–1986: Los Angeles Harbor CC
- 1986–1989: Cal State Fullerton (asst.)
- 1989–2000: Utah (asst.)
- 2000–2003: Cal State Fullerton
- 2003–2010: UCLA (asst.)
- 2010–2019: Gonzaga (asst.)
- 2019–present: Utah (Director of Player Development)

Donny Daniels (born August 3, 1954) is an American coach who currently serves as the men's basketball Director of Player Development at the University of Utah. He previously served as head coach at Cal State Fullerton from 2001 to 2003, was on head coach Rick Majerus' staff as assistant coach at the University of Utah from 1990 to 2000, a men's basketball assistant coach at UCLA from 2003 to 2010, and a men's basketball assistant coach at Gonzaga University from 2010 to 2019. In 2004, Rivals.com stated that Daniels was one of college basketball's Top 25 recruiters. He is the father of four children.
