= 2015–16 San Jose State Spartans men's basketball team =

American college basketball season

2015–16 San Jose State Spartans men's basketball
- Conference: Mountain West Conference
- Record: 9–22 (4–14 Mountain West)
- Head coach: Dave Wojcik (3rd season)
- Assistant coaches: Mike Lepore; Rodney Tention; Tyler Ojanen
- Home arena: Event Center Arena

2015–16 Mountain West Conference men's basketball standings
	Conf.				Overall
Team	W		L	PCT	W		L	PCT
San Diego State	16	–	2	.889	28	–	10	.737
Fresno State †	13	–	5	.722	25	–	10	.714
Boise State	11	–	7	.611	20	–	12	.625
Nevada	10	–	8	.556	24	–	14	.632
New Mexico	10	–	8	.556	17	–	15	.531
Colorado State	8	–	10	.444	18	–	16	.529
UNLV	8	–	10	.444	18	–	15	.545
Utah State	7	–	11	.389	16	–	15	.516
Wyoming	7	–	11	.389	14	–	18	.438
Air Force	5	–	13	.278	14	–	18	.438
San Jose State	4	–	14	.222	9	–	22	.290
† Conference tournament winner

The 2015–16 San Jose State Spartans men's basketball team represented San Jose State University during the 2015–16 NCAA Division I men's basketball season. The Spartans, led by third year head coach Dave Wojcik, played their home games at the Event Center Arena and were members of the Mountain West Conference. They finished the season 9–22, 4–14 in Mountain West play to finish in last place. They lost in the first round of the Mountain West tournament to Colorado State.

== Previous season ==
The Spartans finished the season 2–28, 0–18 in Mountain West play to finish in last place. During the season, the Spartans were invited and participated in the Wooden Legacy in Anaheim, California. They earned last place from not defeating any team they were against in the tournament. They failed to defeat a Division I opponent. Due to APR penalties, San Jose State was ineligible for postseason tournament play, including the Mountain West tournament.

== Departures ==
Name	Number	Pos.	Height	Weight	Year	Hometown	Notes
Rashad Muhammad	0	G	6'6"	170	Sophomore	Las Vegas, NV	Transferred to Miami (FL)
Jordan Baker	1	G	6'4"	195	RS Junior	Phoenix, AZ	Dismissed from team
Jaleel Williams	2	F	6'7"	220	Senior	Killen, TX	Graduated
Darryl Gaynor II	5	G	6'2"	165	Freshman	Las Vegas, NV	Transferred to the College of Southern Idaho
Devante Wilson	22	G	6'4"	220	Senior	Muskogee, OK	Graduated
Matt Pollard	35	C	7'0"	260	Sophomore	Houston, TX	Transferred to Midwestern State

=== Incoming transfers ===
Name	Number	Pos.	Height	Weight	Year	Hometown	Notes
Gary Williams, Jr.	2	G	6'5"	215	Junior	Oakland, CA	Junior college transfer from Indian Hills.

== Recruits ==
College recruiting information
Name	Hometown	School	Height	Weight	Commit date
Brandon Clarke; PF	Phoenix, AZ	Desert Vista HS	6 ft 7 in (2.01 m)	190 lb (86 kg)	Jul 29, 2014
Brandon Clarke; PF	Recruit ratings: Scout: Rivals: (75)				
Cody Schwartz; PF	De Pere, WI	West De Pere HS	6 ft 7 in (2.01 m)	180 lb (82 kg)	Oct 7, 2014
Cody Schwartz; PF	Recruit ratings: Scout: Rivals: (80)				
Ryan Welage; SG	Greensburg, IN	Greensburg Community HS	6 ft 8 in (2.03 m)	195 lb (88 kg)	Jan 1, 2015
Ryan Welage; SG	Recruit ratings: Scout: Rivals: (NR)				
Gary Williams, Jr. PG	Oakland, CA	Indian Hills CC	6 ft 5 in (1.96 m)	215 lb (98 kg)	Apr 21, 2015
Gary Williams, Jr. PG	Recruit ratings: Rivals: (NR)				
Jaycee Hillsman; SF	Chicago, IL	Don Bosco Prep	6 ft 5 in (1.96 m)	190 lb (86 kg)	May 6, 2015
Jaycee Hillsman; SF	Recruit ratings: Scout: Rivals: (NR)				
Overall recruit ranking: Scout: – Rivals: –
Note: In many cases, Scout, Rivals, 247Sports, On3, and ESPN may conflict in their listings of height and weight.; In these cases, the average was taken. ESPN grades are on a 100-point scale.; Sources: "2015 San Jose State Basketball Recruiting Commits". Scout.; "Scout.com Team Recruiting Rankings". Scout.; "2015 Team Ranking". Rivals.

== Roster ==
2015–16 San Jose State Spartans men's basketball team
Players
Coaches

Pos.	#	Name	Height	Weight	Year	Previous school	Hometown
G	0	Jaycee Hillsman	6 ft 6 in (1.98 m)	225 lb (102 kg)	Fr	Simeon Career Academy	Chicago, IL
G	2	Gary Williams, Jr. (C)	6 ft 5 in (1.96 m)	215 lb (98 kg)	Jr	Castlemont HS; Indian Hills CC	Oakland, CA
F	4	Brandon Mitchell	6 ft 6 in (1.98 m)	215 lb (98 kg)	Jr	Ridgeway HS	Memphis, TN
C	10	Ivo Basor (W)	6 ft 8 in (2.03 m)	240 lb (109 kg)	Sr	Watsonville HS; Monterey Peninsula CC	Watsonville, CA
G	11	Danny Mahoney (W)	6 ft 0 in (1.83 m)	160 lb (73 kg)	So	Serra HS	San Mateo, CA
F	14	Frank Rogers	6 ft 9 in (2.06 m)	225 lb (102 kg)	RS Sr	Salinas HS; Cabrillo CC; San Francisco	Salinas, CA
G	15	Brandon Clarke	6 ft 7 in (2.01 m)	190 lb (86 kg)	Fr	Desert Vista HS	Phoenix, AZ
G	21	Jalen James (C)	6 ft 3 in (1.91 m)	170 lb (77 kg)	RS So	La Lumiere School	Chicago, IL
G	23	Princeton Onwas (C)	6 ft 6 in (1.98 m)	215 lb (98 kg)	RS Sr	Seven Lakes HS; Navarro JC; Utah	Houston, TX
F	24	Ryan Singer	6 ft 9 in (2.06 m)	220 lb (100 kg)	So	Heritage HS; Massanutten Military Academy	Littleton, CO
C	25	Leon Bahner	6 ft 11 in (2.11 m)	225 lb (102 kg)	RS Fr	CJD Königswinter	Bonn, Germany
F	32	Ryan Welage	6 ft 9 in (2.06 m)	190 lb (86 kg)	Fr	Greensburg HS	Greensburg, IN
F	33	Cody Schwartz	6 ft 8 in (2.03 m)	205 lb (93 kg)	Fr	West De Pere HS	West De Pere, WI
C	41	Ashtin Chastain	6 ft 11 in (2.11 m)	245 lb (111 kg)	Fr	Norco HS	Norco, CA

Head coach

- Dave Wojcik (Loyola)

Assistant coach(es)

- Mike Lepore (Wake Forest)
- Rodney Tention (San Francisco)
- Tyler Ojanen (California Baptist)

Legend

- (C) Team captain
- (S) Suspended
- (I) Ineligible
- (W) Walk-on
- Injured
- Current redshirt

Roster

== Schedule ==
Date time, TV	Opponent	Result	Record	Site (attendance) city, state
Exhibition
11/07/2015*; 7:00 pm	Pacific Union	W 112–59		Event Center Arena; San Jose, CA
Non-conference regular season
11/14/2015*; 7:00 pm	Idaho	L 54–74	0–1	Event Center Arena (1,327); San Jose, CA
11/16/2015*; 7:00 pm	Montana	W 64–61	1–1	Event Center Arena (1,231); San Jose, CA
11/20/2015*; 7:05 pm	at Montana State	L 69–81	1–2	Worthington Arena (1,806); Bozeman, MT
11/25/2015*; 8:30 pm, CBSSN	vs. Toledo; Great Alaska Shootout Quarterfinals	L 74–89	1–3	Alaska Airlines Center (2,340); Anchorage, AK
11/27/2015*; 1:00 pm, CBSSN	vs. San Diego; Great Alaska Shootout consolation round	W 76–67	2–3	Alaska Airlines Center (2,379); Anchorage, AK
11/28/2015*; 3:00 pm	at Alaska Anchorage; Great Alaska Shootout 5th place game	W 91–87	3–3	Alaska Airlines Center (2,419); Anchorage, AK
12/02/2015*; 7:00 pm	Antelope Valley	W 90–60	4–3	Event Center Arena (1,105); San Jose, CA
12/05/2015*; 7:00 pm	at Santa Clara	L 75–78	4–4	Leavey Center (1,676); Santa Clara, CA
12/08/2015*; 5:00 pm, FS2	at Marquette	L 62–80	4–5	BMO Harris Bradley Center (11,696); Milwaukee, WI
12/13/2015*; 2:00 pm	Montana State	L 83–91	4–6	Event Center Arena (1,116); San Jose, CA
12/20/2015*; 6:00 pm	at Seattle	L 64–67	4–7	KeyArena (1,275); Seattle, WA
12/22/2015*; 12:00 pm	Life Pacific	W 128–66	5–7	Event Center Arena (1,236); San Jose, CA
Mountain West regular season
12/30/2015; 7:00 pm	Utah State	L 71–80	5–8 (0–1)	Event Center Arena (1,417); San Jose, CA
01/02/2016; 11:00 am	at Air Force	L 57–64	5–9 (0–2)	Clune Arena (1,131); Colorado Springs, CO
01/06/2016; 7:00 pm, ESPN3	at San Diego State	L 62–77	5–10 (0–3)	Viejas Arena (12,414); San Diego, CA
01/09/2016; 2:00 pm	Colorado State	L 84–85 ^{OT}	5–11 (0–4)	Event Center Arena (1,470); San Jose, CA
01/13/2016; 7:00 pm	Wyoming	W 62–55	6–11 (1–4)	Event Center Arena (1,395); San Jose, CA
01/16/2016; 4:00 pm, MWN	at Fresno State	L 74–81	6–12 (1–5)	Save Mart Center (6,457); Fresno, CA
01/20/2016; 6:00 pm	at Boise State	L 69–94	6–13 (1–6)	Taco Bell Arena (5,992); Boise, ID
01/23/2016; 2:00 pm, MWN	New Mexico	L 64–83	6–14 (1–7)	Event Center Arena (1,633); San Jose, CA
01/27/2016; 6:00 pm	at Colorado State	L 66–74	6–15 (1–8)	Moby Arena (3,582); Fort Collins, CO
01/30/2016; 2:00 pm	Air Force	W 75–54	7–15 (2–8)	Event Center Arena (2,169); San Jose, CA
02/03/2016; 7:00 pm	Fresno State	W 65–53	8–15 (3–8)	Event Center Arena (2,324); San Jose, CA
02/10/2016; 7:00 pm, ESPN3	at UNLV	L 61–64	8–16 (3–9)	Thomas & Mack Center (11,647); Paradise, NV
02/13/2016; 4:00 pm, RTRM	at New Mexico	L 58–74	8–17 (3–10)	The Pit (13,411); Albuquerque, NM
02/17/2016; 7:00 pm	Nevada	L 55–61	8–18 (3–11)	Event Center Arena (1,560); San Jose, CA
02/21/2016; 1:00 pm, CBSSN	San Diego State	L 56–78	8–19 (3–12)	Event Center Arena (3,317); San Jose, CA
02/27/2016; 6:00 pm	at Utah State	L 70–88	8–20 (3–13)	Smith Spectrum (9,437); Logan, UT
03/02/2016; 6:00 pm	at Wyoming	L 78–81	8–21 (3–14)	Arena-Auditorium (6,617); Laramie, WY
03/05/2016; 2:00 pm, MWN	Boise State	W 68–63	9–21 (4–14)	Event Center Arena (1,759); San Jose, CA
Mountain West tournament
03/09/2016; 4:00 pm, MWN	vs. Colorado State; First round	L 60–81	9–22	Thomas & Mack Center (5,970); Paradise, NV
*Non-conference game. ^{#}Rankings from AP Poll. (#) Tournament seedings in parentheses. All times are in Pacific Time.
