= Dave Wojcik =

American college basketball coach (born 1968)

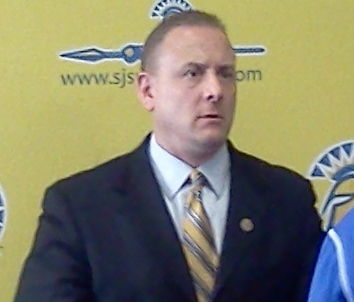
- Wojcik after his introductory press conference at San Jose State in 2013.

Current position
- Title: Assistant coach
- Team: Incarnate Word
- Conference: Southland Conference

Biographical details
- Born: December 12, 1968 (age 57); Wheeling, West Virginia, U.S.

Playing career
- 1987–1991: Loyola (MD)
- Position: Point guard

Coaching career (HC unless noted)
- 1991–1992: James Madison (asst.)
- 1992–1993: West Liberty State (asst.)
- 1993–1994: Loyola (MD) (asst.)
- 1994–1997: Xavier (asst.)
- 1997–2000: Loyola (MD) (asst.)
- 2001–2003: Wheeling Central Catholic HS
- 2003–2004: Navy (asst.)
- 2004–2005: Dayton (asst.)
- 2005–2008: Tulsa (asst.)
- 2008–2009: Tulsa (assoc. HC)
- 2009–2010: Wake Forest (asst.)
- 2010–2013: Boise State (assoc. HC)
- 2013–2017: San Jose State
- 2019–2025: Linsly School
- 2025–present: Incarnate Word (asst.)

Administrative career (AD unless noted)
- 2000–2003: Wheeling Central Catholic HS

Head coaching record
- Overall: 42–13 (.764) (high school); 32–90 (.262) (college)

Accomplishments and honors

Championships
- As head coach: 2× WVSSAC Class A champion (2002, 2003); As assistant coach: College Basketball Invitational (2008); MCC regular season (1995, 1997); MAAC tournament (1994)

David Edward Wojcik (born December 12, 1968) is an American basketball coach who is currently an assistant coach at Incarnate Word. He previously was a college basketball coach, most recently head men's basketball coach at San Jose State from 2013 to 2017.

== Early life and college playing career ==
A native of Wheeling, West Virginia, Dave Wojcik graduated from Wheeling Central Catholic High School in 1987. At Wheeling Central Catholic, Wojcik played point guard and was a McDonald's Honorable Mention All-American selection as a senior.

Wojcik then attended Loyola College in Baltimore and played on the Loyola Greyhounds men's basketball team for four seasons, under coach Mark Amatucci from 1987 to 1989 then Tom Schneider from 1989 to 1991. In his freshman season, Wojcik played 29 games with 8 starts and averaged 3.2 points and 1.2 rebounds. On February 4, 1989, Wojcik had the first triple-double in school history, with 14 points, 10 rebounds, and 11 assists in a 109–77 win over Saint Francis University. Wojcik completed his sophomore season having played 25 games and averaging 7.3 points, 2.2 rebounds, and 4.5 assists. In his junior season (1989–90), Wojcik played in 29 games with 8 starts and averaged 1.9 points and 0.9 rebounds. As a senior in 1990–91, Wojcik played in 10 games with one start and averaged 0.8 points and 0.3 rebounds. Wojcik graduated from Loyola in 1991 with a bachelor's degree in education.

== Coaching career ==
=== Assistant college coach and high school head coach (1991–2013) ===
Wojcik began his coaching career in the 1991–92 season at James Madison University, under Lefty Driesell, who was inducted in the National Collegiate Basketball Hall of Fame in 2007. That season, James Madison finished second in the Colonial Athletic Association and made the 1992 National Invitation Tournament. The following season, Wojcik returned to West Virginia to be an assistant coach for the Division II West Liberty State.

In 1993, Wojcik returned to Loyola and joined Skip Prosser's staff as assistant coach. Following a 2–25 season in 1992–93, Loyola made the 1994 NCAA tournament after winning the MAAC tournament for the school's first-ever NCAA Tournament appearance. Wojcik followed Prosser to Xavier and was an assistant there from 1994 to 1997. Wojcik helped Xavier win the Midwestern Collegiate Conference (now Horizon League) regular season titles in 1995 and 1997, both years in which Xavier made the NCAA Tournament. Among players Wojcik coached at Xavier included 1999 NBA draft selection James Posey, as well as Torraye Braggs, Michael Hawkins, and Larry Sykes.

Wojcik again was an assistant coach at Loyola from 1997 to 2000, this time under Dino Gaudio. In 2000, Wojcik returned to Wheeling Central Catholic High School to be athletic director, a position he would hold until 2003. Wojcik also was varsity boys' basketball head coach at Wheeling Central Catholic from 2001 to 2003 and led the school to two West Virginia Secondary School Activities Commission class A titles in 2002 and 2003.

In the 2003–04 season, Wojcik was an assistant coach at Navy under Don DeVoe. The following season, Wojcik was an assistant coach at Dayton under Brian Gregory. That Dayton team finished the 2004–05 season second in the Atlantic 10 Conference West Division and included future NBA player Brian Roberts, then a freshman.

In 2005, Wojcik joined the staff of older brother Doug Wojcik as assistant coach at Tulsa. Improving from 11–17 in the 2005–06 season to 20–11 in the 2006–07 season, Tulsa finished the 2007–08 season 25–14 and 2008 College Basketball Invitational champions. Dave Wojcik was promoted to associate head coach prior to the 2008–09 season, another 25-win season for Tulsa and with a berth in the 2009 National Invitation Tournament. NBA players Jerome Jordan and Ben Uzoh played under the Wojcik brothers at Tulsa.

Wojcik reunited with Dino Gaudio in the 2009–10 season as assistant coach for Wake Forest, who made the 2010 NCAA tournament. That season at Wake Forest, Wojcik coached future NBA players Ish Smith and Al-Farouq Aminu, the latter of whom was the eighth overall pick in the 2010 NBA draft.

From 2010 to 2013, Wojcik was associate head coach at Boise State under Leon Rice. During Wojcik's three seasons as associate head coach, Boise State made the 2011 College Basketball Invitational, in its final season in the Western Athletic Conference before moving to the Mountain West Conference, and the 2013 NCAA tournament.

=== San Jose State (2013–2017) ===
On March 29, 2013, San Jose State hired Wojcik as men's basketball head coach on a five-year contract. This is Wojcik's first head coaching position at the collegiate level. At San Jose State, Wojcik again worked under athletic director Gene Bleymaier, who was athletic director at Boise State when Wojcik became associate head coach at Boise State until 2012. Wojcik said that fellow coaches such as Tom Izzo, Leon Rice, Doug Wojcik, and Chris Petersen thought he would have a "great opportunity" as San Jose State head coach.

The 2013–14 season was also the first season for San Jose State in the Mountain West Conference. San Jose State began the season 6–6 before finishing 7–24 (1–17 in conference games). On April 1, 2014, San Jose State announced that the men's basketball program would incur penalties due to the Academic Progress Rate from 2012 to 2013, George Nessman's last season as head coach, being below 930. Among the penalties: a post-season ban (including from the MWC Tournament) for the 2014–15 season, replacing four hours of weekly practice with four hours of academic activities, and five days instead of six of basketball activities. Responding to the sanctions, Wojcik stated: "The team recorded its highest grade-point average ever in the 2013 Fall semester. If the team does well academically this semester, they will be in good standing for the 2015–16 season."

Wojcik's second season was even worse, with a 2–28 (0–18 MWC) record, with the two wins against non-Division I opponents. The season was rife with roster depletions from injuries and disciplinary issues. Three players suffered season-ending injuries early in the season. Wojcik announced on December 13, 2014, that five players were suspended indefinitely due to violating team rules; as a result, two members of the San Jose State football team joined the roster temporarily. Five days later, associate head coach Chris Brazelton was placed on paid administrative leave. Ultimately, two of the suspended players, Rashad Muhammad and Jaleel Williams, were reinstated on January 3, 2015. Two other suspended players were dismissed from the team, and another transferred.

In 2015–16, San Jose State improved to a 9–22 (4–14 MW) record that included home wins over eventual conference tournament champion Fresno State and defending conference regular season champion Boise State.

In 2016–17, Wojcik led the Spartans to the first round in the 2017 Mountain West Conference men's basketball tournament where they lost to Utah State in Paradise, Nevada. The Spartans finished the season 14–16; and 7–11 in conference play for 8th place in the regular season. Wojcik lead the Spartans to victories such as, but not limited to: San Diego State, at Washington State, and a sweep against UNLV. The Spartans broke their losing streak against conference teams away and did so a few times, their last being in 2013–14 against at Nevada in their first season as a Mountain West Conference member. Wojcik lead the Spartans to receive an invitation to participate in the Mountain West–Missouri Valley Challenge for 2017–18.

On July 10, 2017, Wojcik resigned from San Jose State for personal reasons.

=== Linsly School (2019–2025) ===
Beginning in 2019, Wojcik was varsity boys' basketball head coach at the Linsly School, a private school in Wheeling. His first team in 2019–20 was 17–8, and Linsly had three more winning seasons afterwards.

=== Incarnate Word (2025–present) ===
On October 21, 2025, it was announced that he was hired as an assistant coach for the Incarnate Word Cardinals men's basketball team.

== Personal life ==
Wojcik is married to Heather Boylan, daughter of college basketball coach Joe Boylan. Their son Jake played college basketball at Richmond from 2018 to 2020 then at Fairfield beginning in 2020. Dave Wojcik's older brother Doug Wojcik is also a college basketball coach.

== Head coaching record ==
=== High school ===
Record table
Season	Team	Overall	Conference	Standing	Postseason
Wheeling Central Catholic Maroon Knights (Ohio Valley Athletic Conference) (2001–2003)
2001–02	Wheeling Central Catholic	21–6			WVSSAC Class A champion
2002–03	Wheeling Central Catholic	21–7			WVSSAC Class A champion
Wheeling Central Catholic:		42–13			
Total:		42–13			
National champion Postseason invitational champion Conference regular season champion Conference regular season and conference tournament champion Division regular season champion Division regular season and conference tournament champion Conference tournament champion

=== College ===
Record table
Season	Team	Overall	Conference	Standing	Postseason
San Jose State Spartans (Mountain West Conference) (2013–2017)
2013–14	San Jose State	7–24	1–17	11th	
2014–15	San Jose State	2–28	0–18	11th	‡
2015–16	San Jose State	9–22	4–14	11th	
2016–17	San Jose State	14–16	7–11	T–8th	
San Jose State:		32–90 (.262)	12–60 (.167)		
Total:		32–90 (.262)			

‡Ineligible for the 2015 Mountain West Conference men's basketball tournament and any postseason play due to unsatisfactory Academic Progress Rate.
