= 2015–16 Nevada Wolf Pack men's basketball team =

American college basketball season

2015–16 Nevada Wolf Pack men's basketball

College Basketball Invitational champions
- Conference: Mountain West Conference
- Record: 24–14 (10–8 MW)
- Head coach: Eric Musselman (1st season)
- Assistant coaches: Doug Stewart; Jay Morris; Jermaine Kimbrough
- Home arena: Lawlor Events Center

2015–16 Mountain West Conference men's basketball standings
	Conf.				Overall
Team	W		L	PCT	W		L	PCT
San Diego State	16	–	2	.889	28	–	10	.737
Fresno State †	13	–	5	.722	25	–	10	.714
Boise State	11	–	7	.611	20	–	12	.625
Nevada	10	–	8	.556	24	–	14	.632
New Mexico	10	–	8	.556	17	–	15	.531
Colorado State	8	–	10	.444	18	–	16	.529
UNLV	8	–	10	.444	18	–	15	.545
Utah State	7	–	11	.389	16	–	15	.516
Wyoming	7	–	11	.389	14	–	18	.438
Air Force	5	–	13	.278	14	–	18	.438
San Jose State	4	–	14	.222	9	–	22	.290
† Conference tournament winner

The 2015–16 Nevada Wolf Pack men's basketball team represented the University of Nevada, Reno during the 2015–16 NCAA Division I men's basketball season. The Wolf Pack, led by first year head coach Eric Musselman, played their home games at the Lawlor Events Center and were members of the Mountain West Conference. They finished the season 24–14, 10–8 in Mountain West play to finish in a tie for fourth place. They defeated New Mexico in the quarterfinals of the Mountain West tournament to advance to the semifinals where they lost to San Diego State. They were invited to the College Basketball Invitational where they defeated Montana, Eastern Washington, and Vermont to advance to the best-of-three finals series against Morehead State. They defeated Morehead State 2 games to 1 to become the CBI champions.

== Previous season ==
The Wolf Pack finished season 9–22, 5–13 in Mountain West play to finish in tenth place. They lost in the first round of the Mountain West tournament to UNLV. At the end of the season, head coach David Carter was fired. He compiled a record of 98–97 in six seasons.

== Departures ==
Name	Number	Pos.	Height	Weight	Year	Hometown	Notes
Stelios Papafloratos	10	G	6'4"	170	Sophomore	Athens, Greece	Transferred to Southeastern Oklahoma State
Patrick Conroy	11	G	6'2"	180	Sophomore	Novato, CA	Walk-on, left the team
Michael Perez	23	G	6'3"	190	RS Senior	Tucson, AZ	Graduated
Ronnie Stevens, Jr.	33	F/C	6'8"	230	Senior	Los Angeles, CA	Graduated

=== Incoming transfers ===
Name	Number	Pos.	Height	Weight	Year	Hometown	Notes
Marcus Marshall	10	G	6'3"	190	Senior	Saint Paul, MN	Transferred from Missouri State. Under NCAA transfer rules, Marshall will have to sit out for the 2015–16 season. Will have one year of remaining eligibility.
Jordan Caroline	14	F	6'6"	235	Sophomore	Champaign, IL	Transferred from Southern Illinois. Under NCAA transfer rules, Caroline will have to sit out for the 2015–16 season. Will have three years of remaining eligibility.

== Recruiting ==
College recruiting information
Name	Hometown	School	Height	Weight	Commit date
Lindsey Drew; PG	Los Angeles, CA	Fairfax HS	6 ft 2 in (1.88 m)	175 lb (79 kg)	Apr 29, 2015
Lindsey Drew; PG	Recruit ratings: Scout: Rivals: (75)				
Overall recruit ranking: Scout: – Rivals: –
Note: In many cases, Scout, Rivals, 247Sports, On3, and ESPN may conflict in their listings of height and weight.; In these cases, the average was taken. ESPN grades are on a 100-point scale.; Sources: "2015 Team Ranking". Rivals.

== Roster ==
2015–16 Nevada Wolf Pack men's basketball team
Players
Coaches

Pos.	#	Name	Height	Weight	Year	Previous school	Hometown
F	0	Cameron Oliver (W)	6 ft 8 in (2.03 m)	225 lb (102 kg)	Fr	Grant HS	Sacramento, CA
G	1	Marqueze Coleman	6 ft 4 in (1.93 m)	190 lb (86 kg)	Sr	Bishop Alemany HS	Mission Hills, CA
G	2	Tyron Criswell	6 ft 3 in (1.91 m)	205 lb (93 kg)	Sr	Omaha Benson HS; Central CC	Omaha, NE
C	3	AJ West	6 ft 9 in (2.06 m)	235 lb (107 kg)	Sr	Create Charter; Monroe College	Brooklyn, NY
F	5	Kaileb Rodriguez	6 ft 9 in (2.06 m)	235 lb (107 kg)	Jr	ThunderRidge HS; Sheridan College	Highlands Ranch, CO
G	10	Marcus Marshall (I) (redshirt)	6 ft 3 in (1.91 m)	190 lb (86 kg)	Sr	Johnson Sr. HS; Missouri State	Saint Paul, MN
F	12	Elijah Foster	6 ft 7 in (2.01 m)	255 lb (116 kg)	So	Rainier Beach HS	Seattle, WA
G	14	Lindsey Drew	6 ft 4 in (1.93 m)	180 lb (82 kg)	Fr	Fairfax HS	Los Angeles, CA
G	15	DJ Fenner	6 ft 6 in (1.98 m)	205 lb (93 kg)	Jr	Seattle Prep	Seattle, WA
F	20	Robyn Missa	6 ft 9 in (2.06 m)	245 lb (111 kg)	So	Lutheran HS	Berlin, Germany
G	21	Eric Cooper, Jr.	6 ft 3 in (1.91 m)	180 lb (82 kg)	So	IMG Academy	Long Beach, CA
F	24	Jordan Caroline (I) (redshirt)	6 ft 7 in (2.01 m)	235 lb (107 kg)	So	Montverde Academy; Southern Illinois	Champaign, IL
F	34	Lucas Stivrins	6 ft 11 in (2.11 m)	235 lb (107 kg)	Sr	North Pointe Prep; Pratt CC	Scottsdale, AZ

Head coach

- Eric Musselman (San Diego)

Assistant coach(es)

- Doug Stewart (Brown)
- Jay Morris (Cal State Dominguez Hills)
- Jermaine Kimbrough (Virginia Tech)

Legend

- (C) Team captain
- (S) Suspended
- (I) Ineligible
- (W) Walk-on
- Injured
- Current redshirt

Roster

== Schedule ==
Date time, TV	Opponent	Result	Record	Site (attendance) city, state
Exhibition
10/30/2015*; 7:00 pm	Dominican (CA)	W 82–52		Lawlor Events Center (2,139); Reno, NV
11/06/2015*; 7:00 pm	Alaska–Fairbanks	W 84–53		Lawlor Events Center (3,543); Reno, NV
Non-conference regular season
11/13/2015*; 6:00 pm	vs. Coastal Carolina; Rainbow Classic	W 73–56	1–0	Stan Sheriff Center (6,259); Honolulu, HI
11/15/2015*; 4:00 pm	vs. Montana State; Rainbow Classic	W 83–62	2–0	Stan Sheriff Center (5,271); Honolulu, HI
11/17/2015*; 1:00 am, ESPN2	at Hawaii; Rainbow Classic/College Hoops Tip-Off Marathon	L 75–76	2–1	Stan Sheriff Center (5,471); Honolulu, HI
11/21/2015*; 7:00 pm	at Pacific	W 85–82 ^{2OT}	3–1	Alex G. Spanos Center (2,169); Stockton, CA
11/25/2015*; 7:00 pm	Portland State	W 76–73	4–1	Lawlor Events Center (5,890); Reno, NV
11/28/2015*; 6:00 pm	at Cal State Fullerton	L 66–75	4–2	Titan Gym (905); Fullerton, CA
11/30/2015*; 7:00 pm	Holy Names	W 108–57	5–2	Lawlor Events Center (4,896); Reno, NV
12/05/2015*; 1:00 pm, P12N	at Oregon State	L 62–66	5–3	Gill Coliseum (4,891); Corvallis, OR
12/09/2015*; 7:00 pm	Fresno Pacific	W 119–70	6–3	Lawlor Events Center (5,014); Reno, NV
12/12/2015*; 4:00 pm	Drake; MW–MVC Challenge	W 79–71	7–3	Lawlor Events Center (5,541); Reno, NV
12/18/2015*; 7:00 pm	Santa Clara	W 72–69	8–3	Lawlor Events Center (5,813); Reno, NV
12/22/2015*; 5:00 pm	at Wichita State	L 69–98	8–4	Charles Koch Arena (10,506); Wichita, KS
Mountain West regular season
12/30/2015; 6:00 pm, RTRM	at New Mexico	L 76–88	8–5 (0–1)	The Pit (13,247); Albuquerque, NM
01/02/2016; 3:00 pm, RTRM	Wyoming	W 71–68	9–5 (1–1)	Lawlor Events Center (6,317); Reno, NV
01/06/2016; 7:00 pm	at Fresno State	L 63–85	9–6 (1–2)	Save Mart Center (5,315); Fresno, CA
01/09/2016; 11:00 am	at Air Force	W 86–63	10–6 (2–2)	Clune Arena (1,352); Colorado Springs, CO
01/13/2016; 7:00 pm, MWN	Boise State	L 67–74	10–7 (2–3)	Lawlor Events Center (7,564); Reno, NV
01/20/2016; 6:00 pm	at Wyoming	W 75–69	11–7 (3–3)	Arena-Auditorium (4,959); Laramie, WY
01/23/2016; 7:00 pm, ESPNU	UNLV	W 65–63	12–7 (4–3)	Lawlor Events Center (11,341); Reno, NV
01/27/2016; 8:00 pm, ESPNU	San Diego State	L 54–57	12–8 (4–4)	Lawlor Events Center (6,250); Reno, NV
01/30/2016; 6:00 pm, RTRM	at Utah State	W 89–84	13–8 (5–4)	Smith Spectrum (9,659); Logan, UT
02/06/2016; 1:00 pm, MWN	at Colorado State	L 67–76	13–9 (5–5)	Moby Arena (4,018); Fort Collins, CO
02/10/2016; 7:00 pm, RTRM	Air Force	W 72–52	14–9 (6–5)	Lawlor Events Center (5,624); Reno, NV
02/13/2016; 4:00 pm	Fresno State	W 77–72	15–9 (7–5)	Lawlor Events Center (6,750); Reno, NV
02/17/2016; 7:00 pm	at San Jose State	W 61–55	16–9 (8–5)	Event Center Arena (1,560); San Jose, CA
02/20/2016; 7:00 pm, CBSSN	at UNLV	L 91–102 ^{OT}	16–10 (8–6)	Thomas & Mack Center (14,640); Paradise, NV
02/24/2016; 7:00 pm, RTRM	Utah State	W 73–68	17–10 (9–6)	Lawlor Events Center (6,527); Reno, NV
02/28/2016; 2:00 pm, RTRM	Colorado State	W 87–80 ^{OT}	18–10 (10–6)	Lawlor Events Center (4,018); Reno, NV
03/02/2016; 6:00 pm, MWN	at Boise State	L 57–76	18–11 (10–7)	Taco Bell Arena (8,495); Boise, ID
03/05/2016; 7:00 pm, RTRM	New Mexico	L 66–71	18–12 (10–8)	Lawlor Events Center (7,191); Reno, NV
Mountain West tournament
03/10/2016; 2:30 pm, CBSSN	vs. New Mexico; Quarterfinals	W 64–62	19–12	Thomas & Mack Center (8,279); Paradise, NV
03/11/2016; 6:00 pm, CBSSN	vs. San Diego State; Semifinals	L 55–67	19–13	Thomas & Mack Center (8,036); Paradise, NV
CBI
03/16/2016*; 7:00 pm	Montana; First round	W 79–75	20–13	Lawlor Center (4,524); Reno, NV
03/21/2016*; 10:00 pm	Eastern Washington; Quarterfinals	W 85–70	21–13	Lawlor Center (6,053); Reno, NV
03/23/2016*; 7:00 pm	Vermont; Semifinals	W 86–72	22–13	Lawlor Center (6,133); Reno, NV
03/28/2016*; 5:30 pm, ESPNU	at Morehead State; Finals – Game 1	L 83–86	22–14	Ellis Johnson Arena (4,187); Morehead, KY
03/30/2016*; 6:00 pm, ESPNU	Morehead State; Finals – Game 2	W 77–68	23–14	Lawlor Center (7,431); Reno, NV
04/01/2016*; 6:00 pm, ESPNU	Morehead State; Finals – Game 3	W 85–82 ^{OT}	24–14	Lawlor Center (9,043); Reno, NV
*Non-conference game. (#) Tournament seedings in parentheses. All times are in Pacific Time.
