= 2015–16 Colorado State Rams men's basketball team =

American college basketball season

2015–16 Colorado State Rams men's basketball
- Conference: Mountain West Conference
- Record: 18–16 (8–10 Mountain West)
- Head coach: Larry Eustachy (4th season)
- Assistant coaches: Leonard Perry; Ross Hodge; Steve Barnes
- Home arena: Moby Arena

2015–16 Mountain West Conference men's basketball standings
	Conf.				Overall
Team	W		L	PCT	W		L	PCT
San Diego State	16	–	2	.889	28	–	10	.737
Fresno State †	13	–	5	.722	25	–	10	.714
Boise State	11	–	7	.611	20	–	12	.625
Nevada	10	–	8	.556	24	–	14	.632
New Mexico	10	–	8	.556	17	–	15	.531
Colorado State	8	–	10	.444	18	–	16	.529
UNLV	8	–	10	.444	18	–	15	.545
Utah State	7	–	11	.389	16	–	15	.516
Wyoming	7	–	11	.389	14	–	18	.438
Air Force	5	–	13	.278	14	–	18	.438
San Jose State	4	–	14	.222	9	–	22	.290
† Conference tournament winner

The 2015–16 Colorado State Rams men's basketball team represented Colorado State University during the 2015–16 NCAA Division I men's basketball season. The team was coached by Larry Eustachy in his fourth season. They played their home games at the Moby Arena on Colorado State University's main campus in Fort Collins, Colorado and were members of the Mountain West Conference. They finished the season 18–16, 8–10 in Mountain West play to finish in a tie for sixth place. They defeated San Jose State and Boise State to advance to the semifinals of the Mountain West tournament where they lost to Fresno State. They did not participate in a postseason tournament.

== Previous season ==
The Rams finished the season 27–7, 13–5 in Mountain West play to finish in third place. They advanced to the semifinals of the Mountain West tournament where they lost to San Diego State. They were invited to the National Invitation Tournament where they lost in the first round to South Dakota State.

== Departures ==
Name	Number	Pos.	Height	Weight	Year	Hometown	Notes
Daniel Bejarano	2	G	6'5"	210	RS Senior	Phoenix, AZ	Graduated
Stanton Kidd	11	F	6'7"	225	RS Senior	Baltimore, MD	Graduated
Carlton Hurst	12	G	6'3"	190	Sophomore	Aurora, CO	Transferred to South Dakota
Daniel Mulamba	23	F	6'9"	230	Junior	Terrell, TX	Not cleared by NCAA, transferred to Langston University
Marcus Holt	30	F/C	6'10"	204	Senior	Aurora, CO	Graduated
J. J. Avila	31	F	6'8"	250	RS Senior	McAllen, TX	Graduated

=== Incoming transfers ===
Name	Number	Pos.	Height	Weight	Year	Hometown	Previous School
Kimani Jackson	0	F	6'8"	230	RS Sophomore	Arlington, TX	Junior college transferred from New Mexico Junior College.
Emmanuel Omogbo	2	F	6'8"	220	Junior	Hyttesville, MD	Junior college transferred from South Plains College.

== 2015 Recruiting Class ==
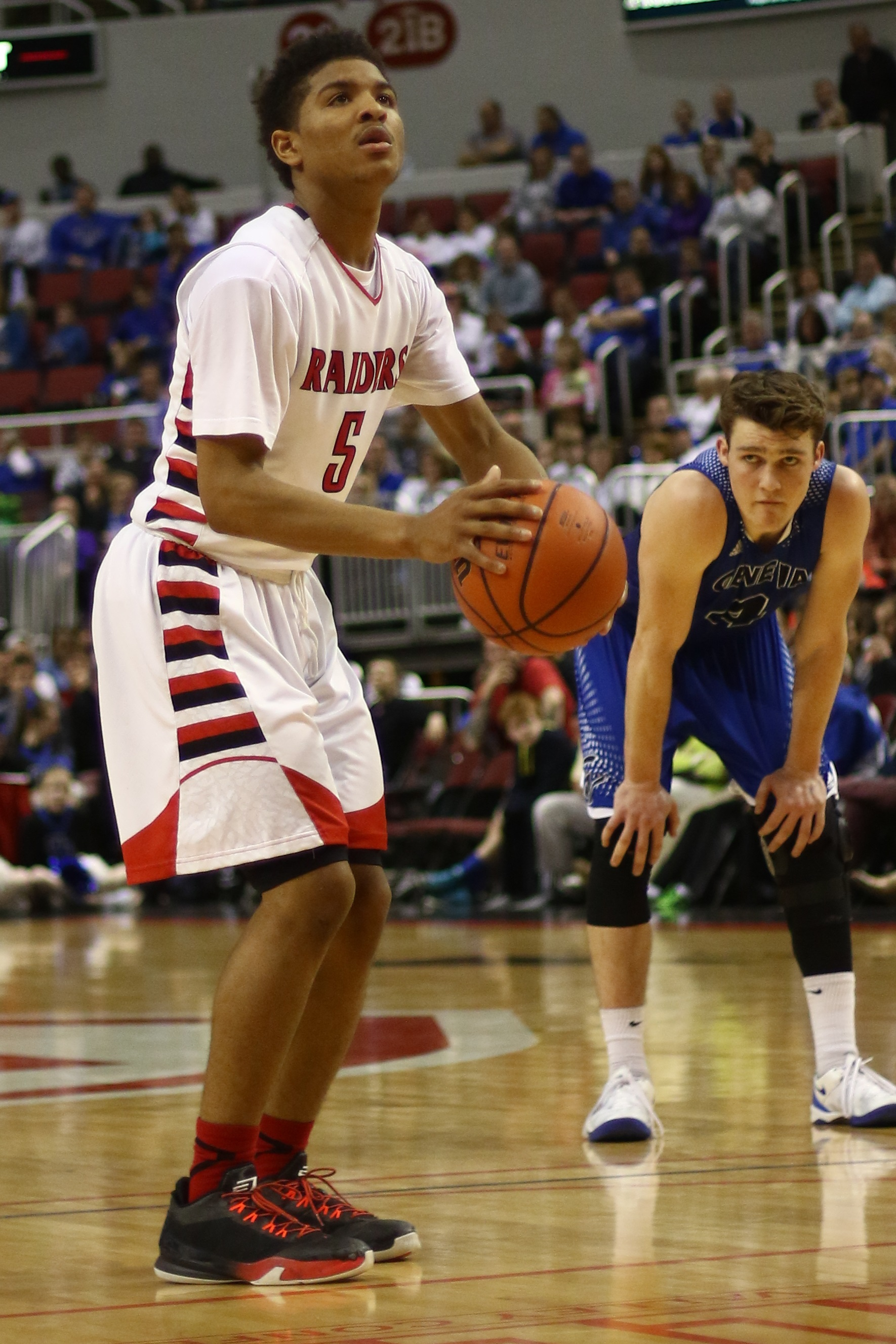
Prentiss Nixon at the 2015 IHSA 4A final four

College recruiting
Name	Hometown	School	Height	Weight	Commit date
Prentiss Nixon; PG	Bolingbrook, IL	Bolingbrook High School	6 ft 1 in (1.85 m)	175 lb (79 kg)	Jun 15, 2014
Prentiss Nixon; PG	Recruit ratings: Scout: Rivals: (79)				
Anthony Bonner; SG	Lawrence, KS	Lawrence High School	6 ft 2 in (1.88 m)	170 lb (77 kg)	Jun 2, 2014
Anthony Bonner; SG	Recruit ratings: Scout: Rivals: (N/A)				
Nico Carvacho; PF	Frisco, Texas	Sunrise Christian Academy	6 ft 10 in (2.08 m)	225 lb (102 kg)	Oct 19, 2014
Nico Carvacho; PF	Recruit ratings: Scout: Rivals: (N/A)				
Overall recruit ranking: Scout: – Rivals: –
Note: In many cases, Scout, Rivals, 247Sports, On3, and ESPN may conflict in their listings of height and weight.; In these cases, the average was taken. ESPN grades are on a 100-point scale.; Sources: "Colorado State Commit List for 2015". Rivals.; "Men's Basketball Recruiting". Scout.; "ESPN – Colorado State Rams Basketball Recruiting 2015". ESPN.; "Scout.com Team Recruiting Rankings". Scout.; "2015 Team Ranking". Rivals.

=== 2016 Recruiting Class ===
College recruiting (2016)
Name	Hometown	School	Height	Weight	Commit date
C.J. Keyser; SG	Bel Air, MD	Sunrise Christian Academy	6 ft 3 in (1.91 m)	185 lb (84 kg)	Apr 15, 2015
C.J. Keyser; SG	Recruit ratings: Scout: Rivals: (81)				
Overall recruit ranking: Scout: – Rivals: –
Note: In many cases, Scout, Rivals, 247Sports, On3, and ESPN may conflict in their listings of height and weight.; In these cases, the average was taken. ESPN grades are on a 100-point scale.; Sources: "Colorado State Commit List for 2016". Rivals.; "Men's Basketball Recruiting". Scout.; "ESPN – Colorado State Rams Basketball Recruiting 2016". ESPN.; "Scout.com Team Recruiting Rankings". Scout.; "2016 Team Ranking". Rivals.

== Roster ==
2015–16 Colorado State Rams men's basketball team
Players
Coaches

Pos.	#	Name	Height	Weight	Year	Previous school	Hometown
F	0	Kimani Jackson	6 ft 8 in (2.03 m)	223 lb (101 kg)	RS So	New Mexico JC	Arlington, TX
G	1	Antwan Scott	6 ft 2 in (1.88 m)	178 lb (81 kg)	RS Sr	Grambling State	Wylie, TX
F	2	Emmanuel Omogbo	6 ft 8 in (2.03 m)	210 lb (95 kg)	Jr	South Plains College	Hyattsville, MD
G	3	Gian Clavell	6 ft 4 in (1.93 m)	185 lb (84 kg)	Jr	Northwest Kansas Tech Coll.	Caguas, PR
G	4	John Gillon	6 ft 0 in (1.83 m)	168 lb (76 kg)	RS Jr	Arkansas-Little Rock	Houston, TX
G	5	Fred Richardson III	6 ft 7 in (2.01 m)	212 lb (96 kg)	Sr	Lee College	Houston, TX
G	10	Joe De Ciman	6 ft 6 in (1.98 m)	201 lb (91 kg)	Sr	Dr. Martin LeBoldus HS	Regina, SK
G	11	Prentiss Nixon	6 ft 1 in (1.85 m)	180 lb (82 kg)	Fr	Bolingbrook HS	Bolingbrook, IL
G	13	Mike Burnett (W)	6 ft 2 in (1.88 m)	175 lb (79 kg)	RS Sr	Manuel HS	Denver, CO
F	15	Tiel Daniels	6 ft 7 in (2.01 m)	235 lb (107 kg)	RS Sr	Southern Illinois	Wentzville, MO
G	22	Jeremiah Page	6 ft 3 in (1.91 m)	166 lb (75 kg)	RS Fr	Rangeview HS	Aurora, CO
G	25	Anthony Bonner	6 ft 2 in (1.88 m)	170 lb (77 kg)	Fr	Lawrence HS	Lawrence, KS
F/C	32	Nico Carvacho	6 ft 10 in (2.08 m)	225 lb (102 kg)	Fr	Sunrise Christian Academy	Frisco, TX
F	41	Toby Van Ry	6 ft 10 in (2.08 m)	196 lb (89 kg)	RS Fr	Fort Collins HS	Fort Collins, CO

Head coach

- Larry Eustachy (Long Beach State)

Assistant coach(es)

- Leonard Perry (Idaho)
- Ross Hodge (East Texas A&M)
- Steve Barnes (Azusa Pacific)

Legend

- (C) Team captain
- (S) Suspended
- (I) Ineligible
- (W) Walk-on
- Injured
- Current redshirt

Roster

== Schedule ==
Date time, TV	Opponent	Result	Record	Site (attendance) city, state
Exhibition
11/07/2015*; 2:00 pm	CSU–Pueblo	W 89–65		Moby Arena (3,506); Fort Collins, CO
Non-conference regular season
11/14/2015*; 10:00 am	at Northern Iowa; MW–MVC Challenge	W 84–78	1–0	McLeod Center (4,455); Cedar Falls, IA
11/19/2015*; 7:00 pm	Loyola Marymount	W 83–75	2–0	Moby Arena (3,142); Fort Collins, CO
11/22/2015*; 2:00 pm	Oakland; Corpus Christi Coastal Classic	W 95–89	3–0	Moby Arena (2,638); Fort Collins, CO
11/24/2015*; 7:00 pm	Abilene Christian; Corpus Christi Coastal Classic	W 108–100 ^{2OT}	4–0	Moby Arena (2,801); Fort Collins, CO
11/27/2015*; 6:30 pm, CBSSN	vs. Portland; Corpus Christi Coastal Classic semifinals	W 90–74	5–0	American Bank Center (183); Corpus Christi, TX
11/28/2015*; 4:00 pm, CBSSN	vs. UTEP; Corpus Christi Coastal Classic championship	L 90–99 ^{2OT}	5–1	American Bank Center (274); Corpus Christi, TX
12/03/2015*; 7:00 pm	Long Beach State	L 77–83	5–2	Moby Arena (3,581); Fort Collins, CO
12/06/2015*; 12:00 pm, RTRM	Colorado	L 77–88	5–3	Moby Arena (8,750); Fort Collins, CO
12/09/2015*; 7:00 pm	Arkansas–Fort Smith	W 97–72	6–3	Moby Arena (2,523); Fort Collins, CO
12/13/2015*; 5:00 pm, CET	at Northern Colorado	L 64–73	6–4	Bank of Colorado Arena (1,576); Greeley, CO
12/19/2015*; 1:00 pm, FSKC	vs. Kansas State; Wichita Wildcat Showcase	L 56–61	6–5	Intrust Bank Arena (9,367); Wichita, KS
12/21/2015*; 7:00 pm	USC Upstate	W 89–61	7–5	Moby Arena (2,658); Fort Collins, CO
12/29/2015*; 7:00 pm	Regis	W 77–53	8–5	Moby Arena (3,103); Fort Collins, CO
Mountain West regular season
01/02/2016; 5:00 pm, ESPN3	at Boise State	L 80–84	8–6 (0–1)	Taco Bell Arena (6,749); Boise, ID
01/06/2016; 8:00 pm, CBSSN	UNLV	W 66–65	9–6 (1–1)	Moby Arena (3,431); Fort Collins, CO
01/09/2016; 3:00 pm	at San Jose State	W 85–84 ^{OT}	10–6 (2–1)	Event Center Arena (1,470); San Jose, CA
01/13/2016; 8:00 pm, CBSSN	San Diego State	L 62–69	10–7 (2–2)	Moby Arena (4,018); Fort Collins, CO
01/16/2016; 2:00 pm, ESPN3	Utah State	L 92–96	10–8 (2–3)	Moby Arena (3,752); Fort Collins, CO
01/20/2016; 7:00 pm, RTRM	at Air Force	W 83–79	11–8 (3–3)	Clune Arena (2,021); Colorado Springs, CO
01/27/2016; 7:00 pm	San Jose State	W 74–66	12–8 (4–3)	Moby Arena (3,582); Fort Collins, CO
01/30/2016; 4:00 pm, RTRM	at Wyoming; Border War	L 76–83	12–9 (4–4)	Arena-Auditorium (8,148); Laramie, WY
02/03/2016; 9:00 pm, ESPN2	at San Diego State	L 67–69	12–10 (4–5)	Viejas Arena (12,414); San Diego, CA
02/06/2016; 2:00 pm, MWN	Nevada	W 76–67	13–10 (5–5)	Moby Arena (4,018); Fort Collins, CO
02/10/2016; 7:00 pm, ESPN3	Boise State	W 97–93 ^{2OT}	14–10 (6–5)	Moby Arena; Fort Collins, CO
02/13/2016; 8:00 pm, ESPNU	at UNLV	L 80–87	14–11 (6–6)	Thomas & Mack Center (11,753); Paradise, NV
02/17/2016; 7:00 pm, ESPN3	at Utah State	L 59–72	14–12 (6–7)	Smith Spectrum (9,377); Logan, UT
02/20/2016; 2:00 pm, MWN	Wyoming; Border War	L 66–84	14–13 (6–8)	Moby Arena (7,067); Fort Collins, CO
02/24/2016; 8:00 pm, CBSSN	New Mexico	W 86–69	15–13 (7–8)	Moby Arena (3,148); Fort Collins, CO
02/28/2016; 3:00 pm, RTRM	at Nevada	L 80–87 ^{OT}	15–14 (7–9)	Lawlor Events Center (4,018); Reno, NV
03/02/2016; 9:00 pm, CBSSN	at Fresno State	L 73–87	15–15 (7–10)	Save Mart Center (9,948); Fresno, CA
03/05/2016; 2:00 pm, RTRM	Air Force	W 87–73	16–15 (8–10)	Moby Arena (4,226); Fort Collins, CO
Mountain West tournament
03/09/2016; 5:00 pm, MWN	vs. San Jose State; First round	W 80–61	17–15	Thomas & Mack Center (5,970); Paradise, NV
03/10/2016; 9:30 pm, CBSSN	vs. Boise State; Quarterfinals	W 88–81	18–15	Thomas & Mack Center (6,325); Paradise, NV
03/11/2016; 9:30 pm, CBSSN	vs. Fresno State; Semifinals	L 56–64	18–16	Thomas & Mack Center (8,036); Paradise, NV
*Non-conference game. ^{#}Rankings from AP Poll. (#) Tournament seedings in parentheses. All times are in Mountain Time.
