= 2015–16 Utah State Aggies men's basketball team =

American college basketball season

2015–16 Utah State Aggies men's basketball
- Conference: Mountain West Conference
- Record: 16–15 (7–11 Mountain West)
- Head coach: Tim Duryea (1st season)
- Assistant coaches: Chris Jones; Tarvish Felton; Louis Wilson
- Home arena: Smith Spectrum

2015–16 Mountain West Conference men's basketball standings
	Conf.				Overall
Team	W		L	PCT	W		L	PCT
San Diego State	16	–	2	.889	28	–	10	.737
Fresno State †	13	–	5	.722	25	–	10	.714
Boise State	11	–	7	.611	20	–	12	.625
Nevada	10	–	8	.556	24	–	14	.632
New Mexico	10	–	8	.556	17	–	15	.531
Colorado State	8	–	10	.444	18	–	16	.529
UNLV	8	–	10	.444	18	–	15	.545
Utah State	7	–	11	.389	16	–	15	.516
Wyoming	7	–	11	.389	14	–	18	.438
Air Force	5	–	13	.278	14	–	18	.438
San Jose State	4	–	14	.222	9	–	22	.290
† Conference tournament winner

The 2015–16 Utah State Aggies men's basketball team represented Utah State University in the 2015–16 NCAA Division I men's basketball season. This was head coach Tim Duryea's first season at Utah State. The Aggies played their home games at the Dee Glen Smith Spectrum and were members of the Mountain West Conference. They finished the season 16–15, 7–11 in Mountain West play to finish in a tie for eighth place. They defeated Wyoming to advance to the quarterfinals of the Mountain West tournament where they lost to San Diego State.

== Previous season ==
The Aggies finished the season 18–13, 11–7 in Mountain West play to finish in a tie for fourth place. They lost in the quarterfinals of the Mountain West tournament to Wyoming.

== Departures ==
Name	Number	Pos.	Height	Weight	Year	Hometown	Notes
Viko Noma'aea	1	G	6'1"	170	Sophomore	Las Vegas, NV	Left the team
Konner Frey	11	G	6'5"	210	Sophomore	Bountiful, UT	Walk-on; didn't return
John Bennett	22	G	6'2"	180	Freshman	Palo Alton, CA	Walk-on; didn't return
JoJo McGlaston	24	G	6'3"	180	Sophomore	Dublin, CA	Transferred to Diablo Valley College
Sean Harris	30	F	6'7"	200	Senior	Rocklin, CA	Graduated
Bilal Begic	55	C	7'1"	225	Junior	Sarajevo, Bosnia-Herzegovina	Transferred

=== Incoming transfers ===
Name	Number	Pos.	Height	Weight	Year	Hometown	Notes
Shane Rector	4	G	6'1"	180	Junior	Bronx, NY	Junior college transfer from Miami Dade College.
Alexis Dargenton	43	F	6'7"	190	Sophomore	Fort-de-France, Martinique	Junior college transfer from Laramie County Community College.

== Recruiting ==
College recruiting information
Name	Hometown	School	Height	Weight	Commit date
Brock Miller; SG	Goodyear, AZ	Brighton	6 ft 5 in (1.96 m)	190 lb (86 kg)	Sep 6, 2014
Brock Miller; SG	Recruit ratings: Scout: Rivals: (70)				
Dusan Majstorovic; SF	Lee, ME	Lee Academy	6 ft 5 in (1.96 m)	210 lb (95 kg)	Sep 21, 2014
Dusan Majstorovic; SF	Recruit ratings: Scout: Rivals: (NR)				
Overall recruit ranking: Scout: – Rivals: –
Note: In many cases, Scout, Rivals, 247Sports, On3, and ESPN may conflict in their listings of height and weight.; In these cases, the average was taken. ESPN grades are on a 100-point scale.; Sources: "2015 Team Ranking". Rivals.

Note: Brock Miller a 2015 high school graduate from Goodyear, AZ, went on a 2-year LDS Mission and will be arriving back on campus at Utah State in the fall of 2017.

== Roster ==
2015–16 Utah State Aggies men's basketball team
Players
Coaches

Pos.	#	Name	Height	Weight	Year	Previous school	Hometown
G	0	Trace Cureton	6 ft 4 in (1.93 m)	185 lb (84 kg)	Sr	Sinclair CC	Indianapolis, IN
G	2	Darius Perkins	6 ft 1 in (1.85 m)	200 lb (91 kg)	Sr	Chaminade-Madonna College Prep; Miami Dade College	Fort Myers, FL
G	4	Shane Rector	6 ft 2 in (1.88 m)	180 lb (82 kg)	Jr	South Kent School; Miami Dade College	Bronx, NY
G	5	Julion Pearre	6 ft 3 in (1.91 m)	190 lb (86 kg)	So	McKinney North HS	McKinney, TX
F	12	Lew Evans	6 ft 8 in (2.03 m)	235 lb (107 kg)	RS Jr	New Hampton Prep; Tulsa	Salt Lake City, UT
F	13	David Collette	6 ft 8 in (2.03 m)	220 lb (100 kg)	RS So	Murray	Murray, UT
G/F	14	Jalen Moore	6 ft 8 in (2.03 m)	215 lb (98 kg)	Jr	Sky View	Smithfield, UT
G	20	Henry Bolton	6 ft 3 in (1.91 m)	190 lb (86 kg)	So	St. Andrew's	Portsmith, RI
G	21	Jake Miles (W)	6 ft 2 in (1.88 m)	180 lb (82 kg)	Fr	Morgan	Morgan, UT
F	22	Quinn Taylor	6 ft 7 in (2.01 m)	210 lb (95 kg)	RS Fr	Langham Creek	Houston, TX
G	24	John Middleton (W)	6 ft 4 in (1.93 m)	215 lb (98 kg)	Fr	Holy Spirit	Atlantic City, NJ
G	32	Grayson Moore	6 ft 7 in (2.01 m)	200 lb (91 kg)	RS Sr	Sky View; Northwest Nazarene	North Logan, UT
G	34	Chris Smith	6 ft 4 in (1.93 m)	210 lb (95 kg)	Sr	Center High; Yuba College	Sacramento, CA
F	43	Alexis Dargenton	6 ft 7 in (2.01 m)	190 lb (86 kg)	So	Laramie County CC	Fort-de-France, Martinique
F	50	Elston Jones	6 ft 9 in (2.06 m)	240 lb (109 kg)	So	Millennium	Goodyear, AZ

Head coach

- Tim Duryea (North Texas)

Assistant coach(es)

- Chris Jones (Utah)
- Tarvish Felton (Southern Utah University)
- Louis Wilson (William Jewell College)

Legend

- (C) Team captain
- (S) Suspended
- (I) Ineligible
- (W) Walk-on
- Injured
- Current redshirt

== Schedule ==
Date time, TV	Opponent	Result	Record	Site (attendance) city, state
Exhibition
10/31/2015*; 7:00 pm	Oklahoma Panhandle State	W 87–48		Smith Spectrum (8,749); Logan, UT
11/06/2015*; 7:00 pm	Cal State Monterey Bay	L 60–77		Smith Spectrum (8,869); Logan, UT
Non-conference regular season
11/13/2015*; 7:00 pm, KJZZ	at Weber State; Old Oquirrh Bucket	W 73–70	1–0	Dee Events Center (8,964); Ogden, UT
11/17/2015*; 7:00 pm	Adams State	W 83–68	2–0	Smith Spectrum (8,423); Logan, UT
11/20/2015*; 7:00 pm	Union (TN)	W 73–49	3–0	Smith Spectrum (8,628); Logan, UT
11/24/2015*; 7:00 pm	Utah Valley; Old Oquirrh Bucket	W 81–55	4–0	Smith Spectrum (8,632); Logan, UT
11/29/2015*; 10:30 am, ESPNU	at No. 6 Duke	L 52–85	4–1	Cameron Indoor Stadium (9,314); Durham, NC
12/01/2015*; 6:00 pm	at Missouri State; MWC–MVC Challenge	W 69–68	5–1	JQH Arena (3,694); Springfield, MO
12/09/2015*; 7:00 pm, BYUtv	at BYU; Old Oquirrh Bucket	L 68–80	5–2	Marriott Center (14,048); Provo, UT
12/12/2015*; 7:00 pm, RTUT	UC Irvine	L 63–73	5–3	Smith Spectrum (8,857); Logan, UT
12/21/2015*; 8:00 pm	Texas–Rio Grande Valley; World Vision Classic	W 94–69	6–3	Smith Spectrum (8,156); Logan, UT
12/22/2015*; 8:00 pm	Idaho State; World Vision Classic	W 69–58	7–3	Smith Spectrum (7,746); Logan, UT
12/23/2015*; 8:00 pm	North Dakota State; World Vision Classic	W 76–62	8–3	Smith Spectrum (8,321); Logan, UT
Mountain West regular season
12/30/2015; 8:00 pm	at San Jose State	W 80–71	9–3 (1–0)	Event Center Arena (1,417); San Jose, CA
01/02/2016; 8:00 pm, ESPNU	San Diego State	L 67–70	9–4 (1–1)	Smith Spectrum (8,626); Logan, UT
01/05/2016; 8:00 pm, CBSSN	Boise State	L 61–76	9–5 (1–2)	Smith Spectrum (8,330); Logan, UT
01/09/2016; 4:00 pm, ESPN3	at New Mexico	L 59–77	9–6 (1–3)	The Pit (13,476); Albuquerque, NM
01/12/2016; 7:00 pm, RTUT	Air Force	W 79–60	10–6 (2–3)	Smith Spectrum (9,243); Logan, UT
01/16/2016; 8:00 pm, ESPN3	at Colorado State	W 96–92	11–6 (3–3)	Moby Arena (3,752); Fort Collins, CO
01/19/2016; 9:00 pm, ESPN3	UNLV	L 68–80	11–7 (3–4)	Smith Spectrum (9,394); Logan, UT
01/23/2016; 3:30 pm, CBSSN	at San Diego State	L 55–70	11–8 (3–5)	Viejas Arena (12,414); San Diego, CA
01/30/2016; 7:00 pm, RTUT	Nevada	L 84–89	11–9 (3–6)	Smith Spectrum (9,659); Logan, UT
02/02/2016; 7:00 pm, ESPN3	at Boise State	L 67–70	11–10 (3–7)	Taco Bell Arena (5,544); Boise, ID
02/06/2016; 4:00 pm, RTUT	at Wyoming	L 65–84	11–11 (3–8)	Arena-Auditorium (6,141); Laramie, WY
02/09/2016; 8:00 pm, CBSSN	New Mexico	W 80–72	12–11 (4–8)	Smith Spectrum (9,290); Logan, UT
02/17/2016; 7:00 pm, ESPN3	Colorado State	W 72–59	13–11 (5–8)	Smith Spectrum (9,377); Logan, UT
02/20/2016; 5:00 pm, RTUT	at Fresno State	L 68–75	13–12 (5–9)	Save Mart Center (7,068); Fresno, CA
02/24/2016; 8:00 pm, RTUT	at Nevada	L 68–73	13–13 (5–10)	Lawlor Events Center (6,527); Reno, NV
02/27/2016; 7:00 pm	San Jose State	W 88–70	14–13 (6–10)	Smith Spectrum (9,437); Logan, UT
03/02/2016; 7:00 pm, RTUT	at Air Force	W 78–65	15–13 (7–10)	Clune Arena (1,556); Colorado Springs, CO
03/05/2016; 7:00 pm, ESPN3	Fresno State	L 85–86	15–14 (7–11)	Smith Spectrum (9,870); Logan, UT
Mountain West tournament
03/09/2016; 12:00 pm, MWN	vs. Wyoming; First round	W 88–70	16–14	Thomas & Mack Center (5,970); Paradise, NV
03/10/2016; 1:00 pm, CBSSN	vs. San Diego State; Quarterfinals	L 65–71	16–15	Thomas & Mack Center (8,279); Paradise, NV
*Non-conference game. ^{#}Rankings from AP Poll / Coaches' Poll. (#) Tournament seedings in parentheses. All times are in Mountain..
