= 2015–16 Air Force Falcons men's basketball team =

American college basketball season

2015–16 Air Force Falcons men's basketball
- Conference: Mountain West Conference
- Record: 14–18 (5–13 Mountain West)
- Head coach: Dave Pilipovich (4th season)
- Assistant coaches: Steve Snell; Andy Moore; Tyson Wright; Nate Zandt
- Home arena: Clune Arena

2015–16 Mountain West Conference men's basketball standings
| | Conf. | | | | Overall |
| Team | W | | L | PCT | W | | L | PCT |
|---|---|---|---|---|---|---|---|---|
| San Diego State | 16 | – | 2 | .889 | 28 | – | 10 | .737 |
| Fresno State † | 13 | – | 5 | .722 | 25 | – | 10 | .714 |
| Boise State | 11 | – | 7 | .611 | 20 | – | 12 | .625 |
| Nevada | 10 | – | 8 | .556 | 24 | – | 14 | .632 |
| New Mexico | 10 | – | 8 | .556 | 17 | – | 15 | .531 |
| Colorado State | 8 | – | 10 | .444 | 18 | – | 16 | .529 |
| UNLV | 8 | – | 10 | .444 | 18 | – | 15 | .545 |
| Utah State | 7 | – | 11 | .389 | 16 | – | 15 | .516 |
| Wyoming | 7 | – | 11 | .389 | 14 | – | 18 | .438 |
| Air Force | 5 | – | 13 | .278 | 14 | – | 18 | .438 |
| San Jose State | 4 | – | 14 | .222 | 9 | – | 22 | .290 |
† Conference tournament winner

The 2015–16 Air Force Falcons men's basketball team represented the United States Air Force Academy during the 2015–16 NCAA Division I men's basketball season. The Falcons, led by fourth-year head coach Dave Pilipovich, played their home games at Clune Arena on the Air Force Academy's main campus in Colorado Springs, Colorado. They finished the season 14–18 with a 5–13 record in Mountain West play, finishing with the tenth-best conference record. They lost in the first round of the Mountain West tournament to UNLV.

== Previous season ==
The Falcons the season 14–17, 6–12 in Mountain West play to finish in ninth place. They defeated New Mexico to advance to the quarterfinals of the Mountain West tournament where they lost to Boise State.

== Departures ==
| Name | Number | Pos. | Height | Weight | Year | Hometown | Notes |
|---|---|---|---|---|---|---|---|
| Marek Olesinski | 0 | F | 6'9" | 220 | Senior | Roswell, NM | Graduated |
| Justin Hammonds | 3 | G | 6'6" | 205 | Senior | Houston, TX | Graduated |
| Kamryn Williams | 4 | F | 6'4" | 193 | Senior | Colorado Springs, CO | Graduated |
| Matt Mooney | 13 | G | 6'3" | 200 | Freshman | Chicago, IL | Transferred to South Dakota |
| Jacob McGraw | 14 | F | 6'6" | 207 | Freshman | Portland, OR | No longer on team roster |
| DeLovell Earls | 21 | F | 6'6" | 225 | Senior | Colorado Springs, CO | Graduated |
| Max Yon | 22 | G | 6'4" | 198 | Senior | San Antonio, TX | Graduated |
| Ethan Michael | 42 | F | 6'8" | 232 | Senior | Toledo, OH | Graduated |

== Recruiting ==
College recruiting information
| Name | Hometown | School | Height | Weight | Commit date |
|---|---|---|---|---|---|
| Ryan Swan; PF | Aurora, CO | Overland High School | 6 ft 6 in (1.98 m) | 215 lb (98 kg) | Nov 10, 2014 |
| Ryan Swan; PF | Recruit ratings: Scout: Rivals: (68) | | | | |
| Garrett Scheer; PF | Las Vegas, NV | Centennial High School | 6 ft 7 in (2.01 m) | 195 lb (88 kg) | |
| Garrett Scheer; PF | Recruit ratings: Scout: Rivals: (62) | | | | |
| Malik Abbott; SG | Las Vegas, NV | Mojave High School | 6 ft 4 in (1.93 m) | 180 lb (82 kg) | May 14, 2015 |
| Malik Abbott; SG | Recruit ratings: Scout: Rivals: (60) | | | | |
| Keegan Culp; SF | Carmel, IN | Carmel High School | 6 ft 6 in (1.98 m) | 195 lb (88 kg) | Oct 20, 2014 |
| Keegan Culp; SF | Recruit ratings: Scout: Rivals: (NR) | | | | |
| Grant Pitman; SF | Cincinnati, OH | Moeller High School | 6 ft 3 in (1.91 m) | 177 lb (80 kg) | Nov 4, 2014 |
| Grant Pitman; SF | Recruit ratings: Scout: Rivals: (NR) | | | | |
| Sid Tomes; SG | Woodbury, MN | East Ridge High School | 6 ft 3 in (1.91 m) | 195 lb (88 kg) | Nov 9, 2014 |
| Sid Tomes; SG | Recruit ratings: Scout: Rivals: (NR) | | | | |
| Will Christmas; SG | Oceanside, CA | Oceanside High School | 6 ft 4 in (1.93 m) | 180 lb (82 kg) | May 10, 2015 |
| Will Christmas; SG | Recruit ratings: Scout: Rivals: (NR) | | | | |
Overall recruit ranking: Scout: – Rivals: –
Note: In many cases, Scout, Rivals, 247Sports, On3, and ESPN may conflict in their listings of height and weight.; In these cases, the average was taken. ESPN grades are on a 100-point scale.; Sources: "2015 Team Ranking". Rivals.

=== Recruiting Class of 2016 ===
College recruiting information (2016)
| Name | Hometown | School | Height | Weight | Commit date |
|---|---|---|---|---|---|
| Trey Smith; SG | Delphos, OH | Jefferson High School | 6 ft 5 in (1.96 m) | 195 lb (88 kg) | |
| Trey Smith; SG | Recruit ratings: Scout: Rivals: (N/A) | | | | |
Overall recruit ranking: Scout: – Rivals: –
Note: In many cases, Scout, Rivals, 247Sports, On3, and ESPN may conflict in their listings of height and weight.; In these cases, the average was taken. ESPN grades are on a 100-point scale.; Sources: "2016 Team Ranking". Rivals.

== Roster ==
2015–16 Air Force Falcons men's basketball team
Players
Coaches

| Pos. | # | Name | Height | Weight | Year | Previous school | Hometown |
|---|---|---|---|---|---|---|---|
| G | 0 | Jace Chacon | 6 ft 4 in (1.93 m) | 195 lb (88 kg) | Fr | Everett | Everett, WA |
| F | 1 | Dane Norman | 6 ft 7 in (2.01 m) | 175 lb (79 kg) | Fr | Foothills Christian High School | San Diego, CA |
| G | 2 | C. J. Siples | 6 ft 3 in (1.91 m) | 170 lb (77 kg) | So | USAFA Prep School | Cibolo, TX |
| G | 3 | Dylan Clark | 5 ft 11 in (1.8 m) | 165 lb (75 kg) | Fr | Woodland Park | Cibolo, TX |
| G | 4 | Daniel Hummer | 6 ft 0 in (1.83 m) | 175 lb (79 kg) | Fr | Upper Arlington | Upper Arlington, OH |
| G | 5 | Zach Kocur | 6 ft 3 in (1.91 m) | 200 lb (91 kg) | Jr | USAFA Prep School | Denver, CO |
| F | 10 | Nick Jorgensen | 6 ft 6 in (1.98 m) | 225 lb (102 kg) | Jr | USAFA Prep School | Minnetonka, MN |
| F | 11 | Joe Tuss | 6 ft 8 in (2.03 m) | 195 lb (88 kg) | Jr | USAFA Prep School | Las Vegas, NV |
| G | 12 | David Louthan | 6 ft 2 in (1.88 m) | 185 lb (84 kg) | Fr | USAFA Prep School | Colorado Springs, CO |
| F | 13 | David Cooper | 6 ft 5 in (1.96 m) | 190 lb (86 kg) | Fr | Tumwater | Olympia, WA |
| G | 14 | Malik Abbott | 6 ft 3 in (1.91 m) | 190 lb (86 kg) | Fr | Mojave | North Las Vegas, NV |
| G | 15 | Jacob Van | 6 ft 2 in (1.88 m) | 185 lb (84 kg) | So | Mansfield Lake Ridge | Mansfield, TX |
| G | 20 | Trevor Lyons | 6 ft 3 in (1.91 m) | 190 lb (86 kg) | So | USAFA Prep School | Newport News, VA |
| G | 22 | Pervis Louder | 6 ft 2 in (1.88 m) | 175 lb (79 kg) | Fr | Village Christian Academy | Raleigh, NC |
| G/F | 24 | Dezmond James | 6 ft 4 in (1.93 m) | 215 lb (98 kg) | So | USAFA Prep School | Parker, CO |
| F | 25 | Kyle Broekhuis | 6 ft 7 in (2.01 m) | 200 lb (91 kg) | Jr | USAFA Prep School | Colorado Springs, CO |
| F | 31 | Luke Lutes | 6 ft 7 in (2.01 m) | 205 lb (93 kg) | So | Jesuit | Sacramento, CA |
| F | 32 | Ryan Manning | 6 ft 6 in (1.98 m) | 190 lb (86 kg) | So | USAFA Prep School | Sacramento, CA |
| C | 33 | Frank Toohey | 6 ft 7 in (2.01 m) | 215 lb (98 kg) | So | York Community | Elmhurst, IL |
| G | 34 | Jason Anderson | 6 ft 4 in (1.93 m) | 225 lb (102 kg) | Fr | Doherty | Colorado Springs, CO |
| F | 35 | Hayden Graham | 6 ft 5 in (1.96 m) | 195 lb (88 kg) | Jr | Anderson | Austin, TX |
| C | 40 | Brandan Leonard | 6 ft 8 in (2.03 m) | 235 lb (107 kg) | So | Olympia | Olympia, WA |
| C | 41 | Zach Moer | 6 ft 11 in (2.11 m) | 218 lb (99 kg) | Sr | Coram Deo Academy | Dallas, TX |

Head coach

- Dave Pilipovich (Thiel)

Assistant coach(es)

- Kurt Kanaskie (La Salle)
- Andy Moore (Muskingum)
- Tyron Wright (Air Force)
- Nate Zandt (Michigan)

Legend

- (C) Team captain
- (S) Suspended
- (I) Ineligible
- (W) Walk-on
- Injured
- Current redshirt

Roster

== Schedule and results ==
| Date time, TV | Opponent | Result | Record | Site (attendance) city, state |
Exhibition
| 11/06/2015*; 7:30 pm | Colorado Christian | W 96–83 | | Clune Arena; Colorado Springs, CO |
Non-conference regular season
| 11/13/2015*; 6:05 pm, ESPN3 | at Southern Illinois; MWC–MWC Challenge | L 75–77 | 0–1 | SIU Arena (4,759); Carbondale, IL |
| 11/16/2015*; 7:00 pm | Tennessee Tech; Air Force Classic | W 80–70 | 1–1 | Clune Arena (488); Colorado Springs, CO |
| 11/19/2015*; 7:00 pm | Mississippi Valley State; Air Force Classic | W 65–64 | 2–1 | Clune Arena (1,129); Colorado Springs, CO |
| 11/22/2015*; 2:00 pm | Robert Morris; Air Force Classic | W 64–52 | 3–1 | Clune Arena (983); Colorado Springs, CO |
| 11/25/2015*; 7:00 pm, P12N | at Colorado | L 70–81 | 3–2 | Coors Events Center (7,698); Boulder, CO |
| 11/28/2015*; 1:00 pm | New Mexico State; Air Force Classic | W 66–64 ^{OT} | 4–2 | Clune Arena (1,034); Colorado Springs, CO |
| 12/02/2015*; 7:00 pm | The Citadel | W 97–93 | 5–2 | Clune Arena (806); Colorado Springs, CO |
| 12/05/2015*; 2:00 pm, RTRM | at Denver | W 61–59 | 6–2 | Magness Arena (3,547); Denver, CO |
| 12/08/2015*; 6:00 pm, BTN | at Ohio State | L 50–74 | 6–3 | Value City Arena (11,816); Columbus, OH |
| 12/12/2015*; 2:00 pm | Army | L 80–90 | 6–4 | Clune Arena (1,694); Colorado Springs, CO |
| 12/19/2015*; 3:00 pm | at UC Davis | W 67–60 | 7–4 | The Pavilion (1,176); Davis, CA |
| 12/22/2015*; 7:00 pm | Johnson & Wales–Denver | W 80–56 | 8–4 | Clune Arena (1,075); Colorado Springs, CO |
| 12/29/2015*; 6:00 pm | Western State Colorado | W 86–66 | 9–4 | Clune Arena (2,009); Colorado Springs, CO |
Mountain West regular season
| 01/02/2016; 12:00 pm | San Jose State | W 64–57 | 10–4 (1–0) | Clune Arena (1,131); Colorado Springs, CO |
| 01/06/2016; 7:00 pm | at Wyoming | L 52–64 | 10–5 (1–1) | Arena-Auditorium (4,681); Laramie, WY |
| 01/09/2016; 12:00 pm | Nevada | L 63–86 | 10–6 (1–2) | Clune Arena (1,352); Colorado Springs, CO |
| 01/13/2016; 7:00 pm, RTRM | at Utah State | L 60–79 | 10–7 (1–3) | Smith Spectrum (9,243); Logan, UT |
| 01/16/2016; 7:00 pm, ESPN3 | at UNLV | L 64–100 | 10–8 (1–4) | Thomas & Mack Center (13,198); Paradise, NV |
| 01/20/2016; 7:00 pm, RTRM | Colorado State | L 79–83 | 10–9 (1–5) | Clune Arena (2,021); Colorado Springs, CO |
| 01/23/2016; 12:00 pm, RTRM | Fresno State | L 55–56 | 10–10 (1–6) | Clune Arena (2,083); Colorado Springs, CO |
| 01/27/2016; 7:00 pm, RTRM | at New Mexico | L 55–84 | 10–11 (1–7) | The Pit (12,072); Albuquerque, NM |
| 01/30/2016; 2:00 pm | at San Jose State | L 54–75 | 10–12 (1–8) | Event Center Arena (2,169); San Jose, CA |
| 02/03/2016; 7:00 pm, RTRM | Wyoming | W 70–62 | 11–12 (2–8) | Clune Arena (876); Colorado Springs, CO |
| 02/06/2016; 12:00 pm, RTRM | Boise State | W 61–53 | 12–12 (3–8) | Clune Arena (2,097); Colorado Springs, CO |
| 02/10/2016; 7:00 pm, RTRM | at Nevada | L 52–72 | 12–13 (3–9) | Lawlor Events Center (5,624); Reno, NV |
| 02/13/2016; 8:00 pm, CBSSN | at San Diego State | L 61–70 | 12–14 (3–10) | Viejas Arena (12,414); San Diego, CA |
| 02/17/2016; 7:30 pm, CBSSN | UNLV | W 79–74 | 13–14 (4–10) | Clune Arena (1,445); Colorado Springs, CO |
| 02/20/2016; 12:00 pm, RTRM | New Mexico | W 76–72 | 14–14 (5–10) | Clune Arena (3,327); Colorado Springs, CO |
| 02/24/2016; 8:00 pm | at Fresno State | L 63–64 | 14–15 (5–11) | Save Mart Center (6,284); Fresno, CA |
| 03/02/2016; 7:00 pm, RTRM | Utah State | L 65–78 | 14–16 (5–12) | Clune Arena (1,556); Colorado Springs, CO |
| 03/05/2016; 2:00 pm, RTRM | at Colorado State | L 73–87 | 14–17 (5–13) | Moby Arena (4,226); Fort Collins, CO |
Mountain West tournament
| 03/09/2016; 2:30 pm, MWN | vs. UNLV; First round | L 102–108 ^{3OT} | 14–18 | Thomas & Mack Center (5,970); Paradise, NV |
*Non-conference game. ^{#}Rankings from AP Poll. (#) Tournament seedings in parentheses. All times are in Mountain Time.

== See also ==
2015–16 Air Force Falcons women's basketball team
