= 2015–16 Wyoming Cowboys basketball team =

American college basketball season

2015–16 Wyoming Cowboys basketball
- Conference: Mountain West Conference
- Record: 14–18 (7–11 Mountain West)
- Head coach: Larry Shyatt (6th season)
- Assistant coaches: Scott Duncan; Jeremy Shyatt; Allen Edwards
- Home arena: Arena-Auditorium (Capacity: 11,612)

2015–16 Mountain West Conference men's basketball standings
	Conf.				Overall
Team	W		L	PCT	W		L	PCT
San Diego State	16	–	2	.889	28	–	10	.737
Fresno State †	13	–	5	.722	25	–	10	.714
Boise State	11	–	7	.611	20	–	12	.625
Nevada	10	–	8	.556	24	–	14	.632
New Mexico	10	–	8	.556	17	–	15	.531
Colorado State	8	–	10	.444	18	–	16	.529
UNLV	8	–	10	.444	18	–	15	.545
Utah State	7	–	11	.389	16	–	15	.516
Wyoming	7	–	11	.389	14	–	18	.438
Air Force	5	–	13	.278	14	–	18	.438
San Jose State	4	–	14	.222	9	–	22	.290
† Conference tournament winner

The 2015–16 Wyoming Cowboys basketball team represented the University of Wyoming during the 2015–16 NCAA Division I men's basketball season. Their head coach was Larry Shyatt in his sixth and final year, including his first tenure in 1998. Shyatt resigned at the end of the year to take a job in the NBA. They played their home games at the Arena-Auditorium in Laramie, Wyoming. The Cowboys were a member of the Mountain West Conference. They finished the season 14–18, 7–11 in Mountain West play to finish in a tie for eighth place. They lost in the first round of the Mountain West tournament to Utah State.

On March 21, head coach Larry Shyatt resigned.

== Previous season ==
The Cowboys finished the season 25–10, 11–7 in Mountain West play to finish in a tie for fourth place. They defeated Utah State, Boise State and San Diego State to become champions of the Mountain West tournament. They received an automatic bid to the NCAA tournament where they lost in the second round to Northern Iowa.

== Departures ==
Name	Number	Pos.	Height	Weight	Year	Hometown	Notes
Riley Grabau	2	G	6'2"	165	Senior	Boulder, CO	Graduated
Charles Hankerson, Jr.	3	G	6'4"	230	Senior	Miami, FL	Graduated
Derek Cooke, Jr.	11	F	6'9"	220	Senior	Washington, D.C.	Graduated
Jack Bentz	13	G	6'1"	180	Senior	Chagrins Falls, OH	Graduated
Larry Nance Jr.	22	F	6'8"	230	Senior	Akron, OH	Graduated/2015 NBA draft
Tyrell Williams	44	F	6'8"	225	Freshman	Miami, FL	Transferred to Western Nebraska CC

== Incoming transfers ==
Name	Number	Pos.	Height	Weight	Year	Hometown	Previous School
Hayden Dalton	20	F	6'8"	185	Sophomore	Parker, CO	Junior college transfer from Central Wyoming College
Morris Marshall	25	G	6'4"	185	Junior	Lake City, FL	Junior college transfer from Santa Fe College

== Incoming Recruits ==
College recruiting information
Name	Hometown	School	Height	Weight	Commit date
Austin Conway #40 PG	Aurora, CO	Overland High School	5 ft 9 in (1.75 m)	165 lb (75 kg)	Jul 1, 2014
Austin Conway #40 PG	Recruit ratings: Scout: Rivals: (79)				
Jordan Naughton #60 C	Rancho Cucamonga, CA	Etiwanda High School	6 ft 9 in (2.06 m)	220 lb (100 kg)	Aug 6, 2014
Jordan Naughton #60 C	Recruit ratings: Scout: Rivals: (69)				
Andrew Moemeka; PF	Lake City, FL	Oldsmar Christian High School	6 ft 8 in (2.03 m)	200 lb (91 kg)	Aug 4, 2014
Andrew Moemeka; PF	Recruit ratings: Scout: Rivals: (N/A)				
Justin James; SG	Port Saint Lucie, FL	Oldsmar Christian High School	6 ft 7 in (2.01 m)	180 lb (82 kg)	Sep 14, 2014
Justin James; SG	Recruit ratings: Scout: Rivals: (N/A)				
Overall recruit ranking: Scout: – Rivals: –
Note: In many cases, Scout, Rivals, 247Sports, On3, and ESPN may conflict in their listings of height and weight.; In these cases, the average was taken. ESPN grades are on a 100-point scale.; Sources: "2015 Team Ranking". Rivals.

=== 2016 Recruiting Class ===
College recruiting information (2016)
Name	Hometown	School	Height	Weight	Commit date
Austin Mueller #72 PF	Highlands Ranch, CO	ThunderRidge HS	6 ft 6 in (1.98 m)	210 lb (95 kg)	Jun 17, 2015
Austin Mueller #72 PF	Recruit ratings: Scout: Rivals: (69)				
Overall recruit ranking: Scout: – Rivals: –
Note: In many cases, Scout, Rivals, 247Sports, On3, and ESPN may conflict in their listings of height and weight.; In these cases, the average was taken. ESPN grades are on a 100-point scale.; Sources: "2016 Team Ranking". Rivals.

== Roster ==
2015–16 Wyoming Cowboys men's basketball team
Players
Coaches

Pos.	#	Name	Height	Weight	Year	Previous school	Hometown
G	1	Justin James	6 ft 5 in (1.96 m)	180 lb (82 kg)	Fr	Oldsmar Christian HS	Port Saint Lucie, FL
G	2	Austin Conway (redshirt)	5 ft 8 in (1.73 m)	175 lb (79 kg)	Fr	Overland HS	Aurora, CO
G	3	Alexander Aka Gorski	6 ft 5 in (1.96 m)	205 lb (93 kg)	So	Sunrise Christian Academy	Lund, Sweden
F	5	Alan Herndon	6 ft 9 in (2.06 m)	210 lb (95 kg)	RS So	Widefield HS	Colorado Springs, CO
G	11	Jeremy Lieberman	6 ft 1 in (1.85 m)	175 lb (79 kg)	So	Calabasas HS	Calabasas, CA
G	12	Cody Kelly (W) (redshirt)	5 ft 8 in (1.73 m)	180 lb (82 kg)	Fr	Campbell County HS	Gillette, WY
G	13	Sam Averbuck (W) (redshirt)	6 ft 3 in (1.91 m)	185 lb (84 kg)	Fr	Suffield Academy	Santa Rosa, CA
G	14	Josh Adams	6 ft 2 in (1.88 m)	190 lb (86 kg)	Sr	Chaparral HS	Parker, CO
F	20	Hayden Dalton	6 ft 6 in (1.98 m)	185 lb (84 kg)	So	Central Wyoming College; Chaparral HS	Parker, CO
C	21	Jonathan Barnes	6 ft 10 in (2.08 m)	245 lb (111 kg)	So	Ponderosa HS	Parker, CO
G	23	Jason McManamen	6 ft 5 in (1.96 m)	195 lb (88 kg)	RS Jr	Torrington HS	Torrington, WY
G	25	Morris Marshall	6 ft 2 in (1.88 m)	180 lb (82 kg)	Jr	Santa Fe College; Columbia HS	White Springs, FL
F	32	Andrew Moemeka (redshirt)	6 ft 5 in (1.96 m)	210 lb (95 kg)	Fr	Oldsmar Christian HS	Lake City, FL
F	33	Jordan Naughton	6 ft 8 in (2.03 m)	225 lb (102 kg)	Fr	Etiwanda HS	Rancho Cucamonga, CA
G	55	Trey Washington III	5 ft 11 in (1.8 m)	185 lb (84 kg)	RS So	Woodrow Wilson HS	Dallas, TX

Head coach

- Larry Shyatt (Wooster)

Assistant coach(es)

- Scott Duncan (Wooster)
- Allen Edwards (Kentucky)
- Jeremy Shyatt (Clemson)

Legend

- (C) Team captain
- (S) Suspended
- (I) Ineligible
- (W) Walk-on
- Injured
- Current redshirt

Roster

== Statistics ==
Player	GP	GS	MPG	FG%	3FG%	FT%	RPG	APG	SPG	BPG	PPG
Josh Adams	30	30	36.9	.441	.378	.827	5.5	4.2	1.5	0.6	24.7
Alexander Aka Gorski	31	10	18.8	.383	.370	.705	2.0	1.1	0.2	0.0	5.6
Jonathan Barnes	28	23	10.4	.462	–	.474	1.7	0.2	0.1	0.2	1.9
Hayden Dalton	28	1	14.7	.438	.303	.786	3.3	1.0	0.3	0.5	3.8
Alan Herndon	31	30	28.5	.517	.304	.597	4.8	1.2	0.5	0.8	7.8
Justin James	30	3	16.4	.418	.358	.565	1.9	0.8	0.3	0.3	5.2
Jeremy Lieberman	31	22	20.9	.342	.351	.773	2.1	1.2	0.4	0.0	4.0
Morris Marshall	8	0	3.0	.286	.000	1.000	0.3	0.0	0.0	0.0	0.6
Jason McManamen	31	31	35.0	.459	.440	.755	3.0	1.5	0.4	0.1	14.4
Jordan Naughton	23	0	11.3	.800	–	.488	1.9	0.0	0.2	0.3	3.0
Trey Washington III	26	5	18.9	.313	.231	.611	2.0	1.2	0.4	0.0	2.8

== Schedule and results ==
Date time, TV	Rank^{#}	Opponent^{#}	Result	Record	Site (attendance) city, state
Exhibition
11/07/2015*; 7:00 pm		Fort Lewis	L 69–77 ^{OT}		Arena-Auditorium (7,677); Laramie, WY
Non-conference regular season
11/13/2015*; 7:00 pm		Bristol University	W 101–62	1–0	Arena-Auditorium (5,812); Laramie, WY
11/16/2015*; 5:00 pm, ESPN3		at Indiana State; MW–MVC Challenge	L 55–70	1–1	Hulman Center (3,601); Terre Haute, IN
11/19/2015*; 7:00 pm		New Mexico Highlands	W 83–67	2–1	Arena–Auditorium (4,462); Laramie, WY
11/22/2015*; 2:00 pm		vs. Montana State; Billings Showcase	L 82–83	2–2	Rimrock Auto Arena (4,207); Billings, MT
11/25/2015*; 7:00 pm		Cal State Bakersfield	W 68–64	3–2	Arena–Auditorium (4,387); Laramie, WY
11/28/2015*; 7:00 pm		Montana State	W 82–68	4–2	Arena–Auditorium (5,022); Laramie, WY
12/02/2015*; 7:00 pm, RTRM		at Denver	W 68–52	5–2	Magness Arena (2,036); Denver, CO
12/05/2015*; 1:00 pm, CBSSN		California	L 72–78 ^{OT}	5–3	Arena–Auditorium (6,568); Laramie, WY
12/10/2015*; 7:00 pm, RTRM		Southern; Global Basketball Classic	L 58–68	5–4	Arena–Auditorium (4,989); Laramie, WY
12/13/2015*; 7:00 pm, Altitude		at New Mexico State	W 62–59	6–4	Pan American Center (4,562); Las Cruces, NM
12/19/2015*; 12:00 pm		Nebraska–Omaha; Global Basketball Classic	W 76–75	7–4	Arena–Auditorium (4,408); Laramie, WY
12/21/2015*; 8:30 pm		vs. Marshall; Global Basketball Classic semifinals	L 82–90	7–5	Cox Pavilion; Paradise, NV
12/22/2015*; 6:00 pm		vs. Houston; Global Basketball Classic 3rd Place	L 89–94 ^{2OT}	7–6	Cox Pavilion; Paradise, NV
Mountain West regular season
12/30/2015; 8:00 pm, CBSSN		at San Diego State	L 55–67	7–7 (0–1)	Viejas Arena (12,414); San Diego, CA
01/02/2016; 4:00 pm, RTRM		at Nevada	L 68–71	7–8 (0–2)	Lawlor Events Center (6,317); Reno, NV
01/06/2016; 7:00 pm		Air Force	W 64–52	8–8 (1–2)	Arena–Auditorium (4,681); Laramie, WY
01/09/2016; 4:00 pm, CBSSN		UNLV	W 59–57	9–8 (2–2)	Arena–Auditorium (5,485); Laramie, WY
01/13/2016; 8:00 pm		at San Jose State	L 55–62	9–9 (2–3)	Event Center Arena (1,395); San Jose, CA
01/16/2016; 2:00 pm, CBSSN		at New Mexico	W 70–68	10–9 (3–3)	The Pit (13,196); Albuquerque, NM
01/20/2016; 7:00 pm		Nevada	L 69–75	10–10 (3–4)	Arena–Auditorium (4,959); Laramie, WY
01/23/2016; 2:00 pm, ESPN3		Boise State	L 71–81	10–11 (3–5)	Arena–Auditorium (6,091); Laramie, WY
01/26/2016; 9:00 pm, ESPN3		at Fresno State	L 60–71	10–12 (3–6)	Save Mart Center (5,802); Fresno, CA
01/30/2016; 4:00 pm, RTRM		Colorado State; Border War	W 83–76	11–12 (4–6)	Arena–Auditorium (8,148); Laramie, WY
02/02/2016; 7:00 pm, RTRM		at Air Force	L 62–70	11–13 (4–7)	Clune Arena (876); Colorado Springs, CO
02/06/2016; 4:00 pm, RTRM		Utah State	W 84–65	12–13 (5–7)	Arena–Auditorium (6,141); Laramie, WY
02/13/2016; 2:00 pm, CBSSN		at Boise State	L 71–94	12–14 (5–8)	Taco Bell Arena (7,334); Boise, ID
02/17/2016; 7:00 pm, RTRM		Fresno State	L 75–79	12–15 (5–9)	Arena–Auditorium (4,852); Laramie, WY
02/20/2016; 2:00 pm		at Colorado State; Border War	W 84–66	13–15 (6–9)	Moby Arena (7,067); Fort Collins, CO
02/24/2016; 8:00 pm, CBSSN		San Diego State	L 61–73	13–16 (6–10)	Arena–Auditorium (5,408); Laramie, WY
02/27/2016; 6:00 pm, ESPN3		at UNLV	L 74–79	13–17 (6–11)	Thomas & Mack Center (12,412); Paradise, NV
03/02/2016; 7:00 pm		San Jose State	W 81–78	14–17 (7–11)	Arena–Auditorium (6,617); Laramie, WY
Mountain West tournament
03/09/2016; 12:00 pm, MWN	(8)	vs. (9) Utah State; First round	L 70–88	14–18	Thomas & Mack Center (5,970); Paradise, NV
*Non-conference game. ^{#}Rankings from AP Poll. (#) Tournament seedings in parentheses. All times are in Mountain Time.
