= 2016 Mountain West Conference men's basketball tournament =

- Classification: Division I
- Season: 2015–16
- Teams: 11
- Site: Thomas & Mack Center; Paradise, Nevada
- Champions: Fresno State (1st title)
- Winning coach: Rodney Terry (1st title)
- MVP: Marvelle Harris (Fresno State)
- Television: MW Net, CBSSN, CBS

2015–16 Mountain West Conference men's basketball standings
	Conf.				Overall
Team	W		L	PCT	W		L	PCT
San Diego State	16	–	2	.889	28	–	10	.737
Fresno State †	13	–	5	.722	25	–	10	.714
Boise State	11	–	7	.611	20	–	12	.625
Nevada	10	–	8	.556	24	–	14	.632
New Mexico	10	–	8	.556	17	–	15	.531
Colorado State	8	–	10	.444	18	–	16	.529
UNLV	8	–	10	.444	18	–	15	.545
Utah State	7	–	11	.389	16	–	15	.516
Wyoming	7	–	11	.389	14	–	18	.438
Air Force	5	–	13	.278	14	–	18	.438
San Jose State	4	–	14	.222	9	–	22	.290
† Conference tournament winner

The 2016 Mountain West Conference men's basketball tournament took place March 9–12, 2016 at the Thomas & Mack Center in Las Vegas, Nevada. The winner of the tournament received the conference's automatic bid to the 2016 NCAA tournament.

== Seeds ==
All 11 conference teams participated in the tournament. The top five seeds received first round byes.

Teams were seeded by record within the conference, with a tiebreaker system to seed teams with identical conference records.

Seed	School	Conference	Tiebreaker
1	San Diego State	16–2	
2	Fresno State	13–5	
3	Boise State	11–7	
4	New Mexico	10–8	2–0 vs. Nevada
5	Nevada	10–8	0–2 vs. New Mexico
6	Colorado State	8–10	0–1 vs. Fresno State
7	UNLV	8–10	0–2 vs. Fresno State
8	Wyoming	7–11	1–0 vs. Utah State
9	Utah State	7–11	0–1 vs. Wyoming
10	Air Force	5–13	
11	San Jose State	4–14	

== Schedule ==
Game	Time*	Matchup^{#}	Television
First round – Wednesday, March 9
1	11:00 am	#8 Wyoming 70 vs. #9 Utah State 88	MW Net
2	1:30 pm	#7 UNLV 108 vs. #10 Air Force 102 ^{3OT}	MW Net
3	4:00 pm	#6 Colorado State 80 vs. #11 San Jose State 61	MW Net
Quarterfinals – Thursday, March 10
4	12:00 pm	#1 San Diego State 71 vs. #9 Utah State 65	CBSSN
5	2:30 pm	#4 New Mexico 62 vs. #5 Nevada 64	CBSSN
6	6:00 pm	#2 Fresno State 95 vs. #7 UNLV 82	CBSSN
7	8:30 pm	#3 Boise State 81 vs. #6 Colorado State 88	CBSSN
Semifinals – Friday, March 11
8	6:00 pm	#1 San Diego State 67 vs. #5 Nevada 55	CBSSN
9	8:30 pm	#2 Fresno State 64 vs. #6 Colorado State 56	CBSSN
Championship – Saturday, March 12
10	3:00 pm	#1 San Diego State 63 vs. #2 Fresno State 68	CBS
*Game times in PT. #-Rankings denote tournament seeding.

== Bracket ==
First round Wednesday, March 9 MWN
8	Wyoming	70
9	Utah State	88
7	UNLV	108***
10	Air Force	102
6	Colorado State	80
11	San Jose State	61

Quarterfinals; Thursday, March 10; CBSSN
1	San Diego State	71
9	Utah State	65
4	New Mexico	62
5	Nevada	64
2	Fresno State	95
7	UNLV	82
3	Boise State	81
6	Colorado State	88

Semifinals; Friday, March 11; CBSSN
1	San Diego State	67
5	Nevada	55
2	Fresno State	64
6	Colorado State	56

Championship; Saturday, March 12; CBS
1	San Diego State	63
2	Fresno State	68

* denotes overtime period
