= Rodney Tention =

American basketball coach (born 1963)

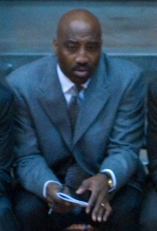
- Tention as assistant coach for Stanford in 2010

Current position
- Title: Head coach
- Team: Saint Francis HS (Mountain View, CA)

Biographical details
- Born: May 27, 1963 (age 63); Columbus, Ohio, U.S.

Playing career
- 1983–1984: Air Force
- 1984–1985: Grossmont CC
- 1986–1988: San Francisco
- Position: Point guard

Coaching career (HC unless noted)
- 1988–1989: Skyline CC (assistant)
- 1989–1991: South Florida (assistant)
- 1991–1994: College of Notre Dame (assistant)
- 1994–1997: College of Notre Dame
- 1997–2005: Arizona (assistant)
- 2005–2008: Loyola Marymount
- 2008–2011: Stanford (assistant)
- 2011–2015: San Diego (assistant)
- 2015–2017: San Jose State (assistant)
- 2018–2019: Palo Alto HS
- 2019–2021: Cal Poly (assistant)
- 2021–2023: Palo Alto HS (assistant)
- 2023–present: Saint Francis HS (Mountain View, CA)

Head coaching record
- Overall: 48–123 (.281)

Rodney Ellis Tention (born May 27, 1963) is an American basketball coach who currently serves as the head coach at Saint Francis High School in Mountain View, California.

Tention was formerly the head men's basketball coach at the College of Notre Dame and Loyola Marymount University. He then served an assistant at Stanford University under head coach Johnny Dawkins for three years, at San Diego under Bill Grier for five, and at San Jose State under Dave Wojcik for two. Following Wojcik's resignation, Tention became interim head coach of San Jose State on July 11, 2017. He held this position while the school performed its search, eventually hiring Jean Prioleau.

== Head coaching record ==
Record table
Season	Team	Overall	Conference	Standing	Postseason
College of Notre Dame Argonauts (Northern California Athletic Conference) (1994–1997)
1994–95	College of Notre Dame	8–18	6–8		
1995–96	College of Notre Dame	4–22	1–13		
1996–97	College of Notre Dame	6–20	2–12		
College of Notre Dame:		18–60 (.231)	9–33 (.214)		
Loyola Marymount Lions (West Coast Conference) (2005–2008)
2005–06	Loyola Marymount	12–18	8–6	3rd	
2006–07	Loyola Marymount	13–19	5–9	6th	
2007–08	Loyola Marymount	5–26	2–12	8th	
Loyola Marymount:		30–63 (.323)	15–27 (.357)		
Total:		48–123 (.281)			
National champion Postseason invitational champion Conference regular season champion Conference regular season and conference tournament champion Division regular season champion Division regular season and conference tournament champion Conference tournament champion
