= Wheeling Central Catholic High School =

Catholic school in West Virginia, United States

Central Catholic High School
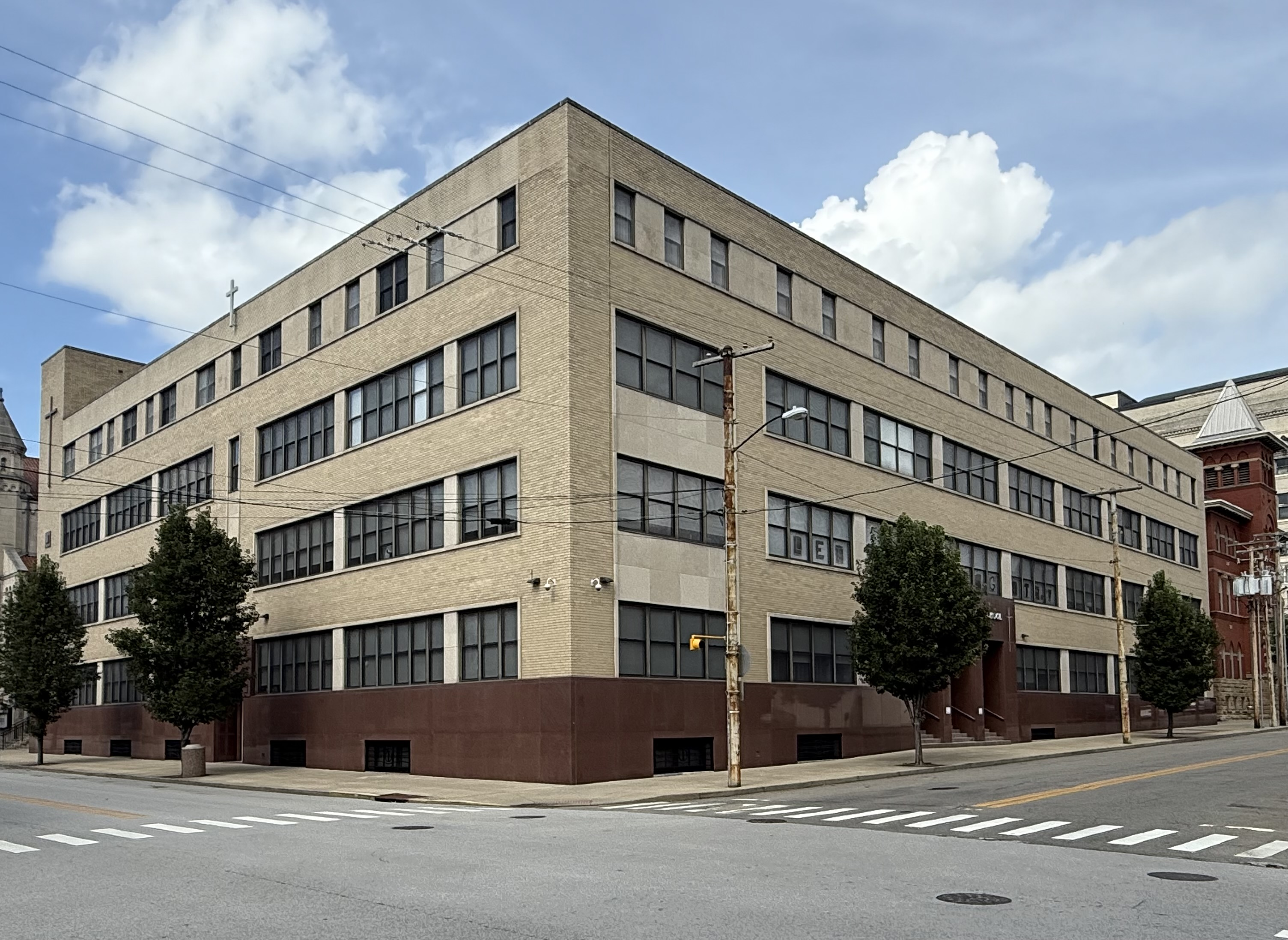
- Central Catholic High School in 2025

Location
- 75 14th Street; Wheeling, West Virginia, (Ohio County) 26003; United States; 40°3′59″N 80°43′10″W

Information
- Type: Catholic secondary school
- Motto: To Think and Act Like Christ
- Religious affiliation: Roman Catholic Church
- Established: 1865; 161 years ago
- Local authority: Bishop Mark Brennan
- Oversight: Roman Catholic Diocese of Wheeling-Charleston
- Superintendent: Jennifer L. Hornyak
- CEEB code: 491400
- NCES School ID: 01489268
- Principal: Rebecca Sancomb
- Faculty: 30
- Gender: Coeducational
- Enrollment: 315 (2024-2025)
  - Grade 9: 82
  - Grade 10: 82
  - Grade 11: 81
  - Grade 12: 70
- Student to teacher ratio: 11.5
- Schedule type: Rotating block schedule
- Hours in school day: 6.5
- Classrooms: 30
- Campus type: Urban
- Colors: Maroon & white
- Slogan: To Think and Act Like Christ
- Fight song: Hail Central
- Athletics conference: Ohio Valley Athletic Conference
- Nickname: Maroon Knights
- Rivals: Shadyside High School, The Linsly School
- Accreditation: North Central Association of Colleges and Schools
- Publication: Knight Times
- Yearbook: Accolade
- Annual tuition: $4980-$9100
- Feeder schools: St. Michaels Parish School, Our Lady of Peace School, St. Vincent de Paul School, Corpus Christi School
- Website: cchsknights.org

Central Catholic High School is a Roman Catholic high school in Wheeling, West Virginia. It was part of the Roman Catholic Diocese of Wheeling-Charleston and opened in 1865.

At the end of the 2016–2017 school year Bishop Donahue Memorial High School closed and merged into Central Catholic.

== Notable alumni ==
- John Corbett, actor
- Joe DeNardo, Pittsburgh meteorologist
- Mike Florio, sportswriter
- Bill Gompers, football player
- Johnny Pramesa, former professional baseball player (Cincinnati Reds, Chicago Cubs)
- Doug Wojcik, college basketball coach
- Dave Wojcik, college basketball coach

== See also ==
- Wheeling, West Virginia – education
- Ohio County, West Virginia – education
