= 2015–16 New Mexico Lobos men's basketball team =

American college basketball season

2015–16 New Mexico Lobos men's basketball
- Conference: Mountain West Conference
- Record: 17–15 (10–8 Mountain West)
- Head coach: Craig Neal (3rd season)
- Assistant coaches: Chris Harriman; Alan Huss; Terrence Rencher
- Home arena: The Pit (Capacity: 15,411)

2015–16 Mountain West Conference men's basketball standings
	Conf.				Overall
Team	W		L	PCT	W		L	PCT
San Diego State	16	–	2	.889	28	–	10	.737
Fresno State †	13	–	5	.722	25	–	10	.714
Boise State	11	–	7	.611	20	–	12	.625
Nevada	10	–	8	.556	24	–	14	.632
New Mexico	10	–	8	.556	17	–	15	.531
Colorado State	8	–	10	.444	18	–	16	.529
UNLV	8	–	10	.444	18	–	15	.545
Utah State	7	–	11	.389	16	–	15	.516
Wyoming	7	–	11	.389	14	–	18	.438
Air Force	5	–	13	.278	14	–	18	.438
San Jose State	4	–	14	.222	9	–	22	.290
† Conference tournament winner

The 2015–16 New Mexico Lobos men's basketball team represented the University of New Mexico during the 2015–16 NCAA Division I men's basketball season as a member of the Mountain West Conference. They played their home games at The Pit in Albuquerque, New Mexico. The Lobos were led by third year head coach Craig Neal. They finished the season 17–15, 10–8 in Mountain West play to finish in a tie for fourth place. They lost in the quarterfinals of the Mountain West tournament to Nevada.

== Previous season ==
The Lobos finished the season 15–16, 7–11 in Mountain West play to finish in eighth place. They lost in the first round of the Mountain West tournament to Air Force.

== Offseason ==
=== Departures ===
Name	Number	Pos.	Height	Weight	Year	Hometown	Notes
Jordan Goodman	2	F	6'9"	209	Junior	Largo, MD	Transferred to Bowie State
Hugh Greenwood	3	G	6'3"	205	Senior	Hobart, Australia	Graduated
Arthur Edwards	5	F	6'6"	210	Junior	Temple Hills, MD	Graduate transferred to Alabama
DeShawn Delaney	33	G	6'5"	200	Senior	Chicago, IL	Graduated

=== Incoming transfers ===
Name	Number	Pos.	Height	Weight	Year	Hometown	Notes
Michael Nesbitt	33	F	6'7"	225	RS Senior	Evansville, IN	Transferred from Missouri S&T. Will be eligible to play immediately since Nesbitt graduated from Missouri S&T.

=== 2015 recruiting class ===
College recruiting
Name	Hometown	School	Height	Weight	Commit date
Jordan Hunter; SG	Beaumont, TX	Ozen HS	5 ft 11 in (1.80 m)	160 lb (73 kg)	Nov 10, 2013
Jordan Hunter; SG	Recruit ratings: Scout: Rivals: 247Sports: ESPN: (78)				
Dane Kuiper; SF	Tempe, AZ	Corona del Sol HS	6 ft 5 in (1.96 m)	190 lb (86 kg)	Jul 14, 2013
Dane Kuiper; SF	Recruit ratings: Scout: Rivals: 247Sports: ESPN: (75)				
Anthony Mathis; SG	West Linn, OR	West Linn HS	6 ft 2 in (1.88 m)	170 lb (77 kg)	May 15, 2014
Anthony Mathis; SG	Recruit ratings: Scout: Rivals: 247Sports: ESPN: (70)				
Nikola Scekic; C	Serbia	IMG Academy	7 ft 0 in (2.13 m)	N/A	
Nikola Scekic; C	Recruit ratings: Scout: Rivals: 247Sports: ESPN: (NR)				
Overall recruit ranking:
Note: In many cases, Scout, Rivals, 247Sports, On3, and ESPN may conflict in their listings of height and weight.; In these cases, the average was taken. ESPN grades are on a 100-point scale.; Sources: "2015 New Mexico Basketball Commits". ESPN.

== Roster ==
2015–16 New Mexico Lobos men's basketball team
Players
Coaches

Pos.	#	Name	Height	Weight	Year	Hometown
F	0	J.J. N'Ganga	6 ft 10 in (2.08 m)	240 lb (109 kg)	Sr	Aubervilliers, France
G	1	Cullen Neal	6 ft 5 in (1.96 m)	195 lb (88 kg)	RS So	Albuquerque, New Mexico
G	3	Jordan Hunter	5 ft 11 in (1.8 m)	180 lb (82 kg)	Fr	Beaumont, Texas
G	4	Elijah Brown	6 ft 4 in (1.93 m)	200 lb (91 kg)	RS So	Cleveland, Ohio
C	11	Obij Aget	7 ft 1 in (2.16 m)	220 lb (100 kg)	Jr	La Porte, Indiana
G/F	12	Devon Williams	6 ft 8 in (2.03 m)	210 lb (95 kg)	RS Jr	Dallas, Texas
G/F	14	Dane Kuiper	6 ft 7 in (2.01 m)	200 lb (91 kg)	Fr	Wasilla, Alaska
G/F	20	Sam Logwood	6 ft 7 in (2.01 m)	210 lb (95 kg)	So	Indianapolis, Indiana
G	21	Xavier Adams	6 ft 4 in (1.93 m)	205 lb (93 kg)	So	Flower Mound, Texas
F	23	Joe Furstinger	6 ft 9 in (2.06 m)	215 lb (98 kg)	So	Rancho Santa Margarita, California
G	25	Tim Jacobs	6 ft 0 in (1.83 m)	200 lb (91 kg)	Sr	Las Cruces, New Mexico
G	30	Adam Cumber (W)	6 ft 2 in (1.88 m)	180 lb (82 kg)	RS Fr	Albuquerque, New Mexico
G	31	Anthony Mathis	6 ft 3 in (1.91 m)	170 lb (77 kg)	Fr	West Linn, Oregon
F	32	Tim Williams	6 ft 8 in (2.03 m)	220 lb (100 kg)	RS Jr	Flossmoor, Illinois
C	33	Nikola Scekic	7 ft 1 in (2.16 m)	255 lb (116 kg)	Fr	Belgrade, Serbia
F	34	Michael Nesbitt (W)	6 ft 7 in (2.01 m)	220 lb (100 kg)	Sr	Evansville, Indiana

Head coach

- Craig Neal (Georgia Tech)

Assistant coach(es)

- Chris Harriman (Augusta State)
- Alan Huss (Creighton)
- Terrence Rencher (Texas)

Legend

- (C) Team captain
- (S) Suspended
- (I) Ineligible
- (W) Walk-on
- Injured
- Current redshirt

Roster

== Schedule ==
Date time, TV	Opponent	Result	Record	Site (attendance) city, state
Exhibition
Nov 3*; 7:00 pm	CSU–Pueblo	W 96–84		The Pit (11,453); Albuquerque, NM
Nov 6*; 7:00 pm	Rogers State	W 80–69		The Pit (11,754); Albuquerque, NM
Non-conference regular season
Nov 13*; 5:30 pm, RTRM	Texas Southern	W 86–57	1–0	The Pit (12,269); Albuquerque, NM
Nov 15*; 7:00 pm	at New Mexico State; Rio Grande Rivalry	W 83–74	2–0	Pan American Center (6,796); Las Cruces, NM
Nov 18*; 7:00 pm, RTRM	Loyola Chicago; MWC–MVC Challenge	W 75–51	3–0	The Pit (11,951); Albuquerque, NM
Nov 21*; 8:30 pm, P12N	at USC	L 82–90	3–1	Galen Center (2,943); Los Angeles, CA
Nov 25*; 7:00 pm, RTRM	Nicholls State	W 75–63	4–1	The Pit (12,383); Albuquerque, NM
Dec 1*; 7:00 pm, RTRM	Oral Roberts	W 91–75	5–1	The Pit (11,585); Albuquerque, NM
Dec 5*; 12:15 pm, BTN	at No. 11 Purdue	L 58–70	5–2	Mackey Arena (14,221); West Lafayette, IN
Dec 12*; 7:00 pm, ESPN3	Northern Iowa; Diamond Head Classic mainland round	W 76–57	6–2	The Pit (13,154); Albuquerque, NM
Dec 16*; 7:00 pm, ESPN3	New Mexico State; Rio Grande Rivalry	W 79–61	7–2	The Pit (15,362); Albuquerque, NM
Dec 19*; 6:00 pm, RTRM	Rice	L 89–90	7–3	The Pit (12,507); Albuquerque, NM
Dec 22*; 12:30 pm, ESPNU	vs. Auburn; Diamond Head Classic quarterfinals	L 78–83	7–4	Stan Sheriff Center (7,161); Honolulu, HI
Dec 23*; 12:30 pm, ESPNU	vs. BYU; Diamond Head Classic 2nd round consolation	L 66–96	7–5	Stan Sheriff Center (6,437); Honolulu, HI
Dec 25*; 11:00 am, ESPN3	vs. Washington State; Diamond Head Classic 7th place game	L 59–82	7–6	Stan Sheriff Center (6,172); Honolulu, HI
Mountain West regular season
Dec 30; 7:00 pm, RTRM	Nevada	L 76–88	8–6 (1–0)	The Pit (13,247); Albuquerque, NM
Jan 2; 7:30 pm, CBSSN	Fresno State	W 77–62	9–6 (2–0)	Save Mart Center (6,881); Fresno, CA
Jan 9; 4:00 pm, ESPN3	Utah State	W 77–59	10–6 (3–0)	The Pit (13,476); Albuquerque, NM
Jan 12; 8:00 pm, CBSSN	at UNLV	L 74–86	10–7 (3–1)	Thomas & Mack Center (11,377); Paradise, NV
Jan 16; 2:00 pm, CBSSN	Wyoming	L 68–70	10–8 (3–2)	The Pit (13,196); Albuquerque, NM
Jan 23; 3:00 pm, MWN	at San Jose State	W 83–64	11–8 (4–2)	Event Center Arena (1,633); San Jose, CA
Jan 27; 7:00 pm, RTRM	Air Force	W 84–55	12–8 (5–2)	The Pit (12,072); Albuquerque, NM
Jan 30; 3:00 pm, ESPN3	at Boise State	W 88–83	13–8 (6–2)	Taco Bell Arena (7,355); Boise, ID
Feb 2; 6:00 pm, CBSSN	UNLV	W 87–83	14–8 (7–2)	The Pit (13,359); Albuquerque, NM
Feb 6; 2:00 pm, CBSSN	at San Diego State	L 71–78 ^{OT}	14–9 (7–3)	Viejas Arena (12,414); San Diego, CA
Feb 10; 8:00 pm, CBSSN	at Utah State	L 72–80	14–10 (7–4)	Smith Spectrum (9,290); Logan, UT
Feb 13; 4:00 pm, RTRM	San Jose State	W 74–58	15–10 (8–4)	The Pit (13,411); Albuquerque, NM
Feb 17; 8:00 pm, CBSSN	Boise State	W 80–78	16–10 (9–4)	The Pit (12,434); Albuquerque, NM
Feb 20; 12:00 pm, RTRM	at Air Force	L 72–76	16–11 (9–5)	Clune Arena (3,327); Colorado Springs, CO
Feb 24; 8:00 pm, CBSSN	at Colorado State	L 69–86	16–12 (9–6)	Moby Arena (3,148); Fort Collins, CO
Feb 27; 8:00 pm, ESPN2	Fresno State	L 82–92	16–13 (9–7)	The Pit (13,546); Albuquerque, NM
Mar 1; 7:30 pm, CBSSN	San Diego State	L 56–83	16–14 (9–8)	The Pit (14,540); Albuquerque, NM
Mar 5; 8:00 pm, RTRM	at Nevada	W 71–66	17–14 (10–8)	Lawlor Events Center (7,191); Reno, NV
Mountain West tournament
Mar 10; 3:30 pm, CBSSN	vs. Nevada; Quarterfinals	L 62–64	17–15	Thomas & Mack Center (8,279); Paradise, NV
*Non-conference game. ^{#}Rankings from AP poll. (#) Tournament seedings in parentheses. All times are in Mountain Time.
