= 2015–16 Fresno State Bulldogs men's basketball team =

American college basketball season

2015–16 Fresno State Bulldogs men's basketball

Mountain West tournament champions

NCAA tournament, First Round
- Conference: Mountain West Conference
- Record: 25–10 (13–5 MW)
- Head coach: Rodney Terry (5th season)
- Assistant coaches: Jerry Wainwright; Byron Jones; Kenton Paulino
- Home arena: Save Mart Center

2015–16 Mountain West Conference men's basketball standings
	Conf.				Overall
Team	W		L	PCT	W		L	PCT
San Diego State	16	–	2	.889	28	–	10	.737
Fresno State †	13	–	5	.722	25	–	10	.714
Boise State	11	–	7	.611	20	–	12	.625
Nevada	10	–	8	.556	24	–	14	.632
New Mexico	10	–	8	.556	17	–	15	.531
Colorado State	8	–	10	.444	18	–	16	.529
UNLV	8	–	10	.444	18	–	15	.545
Utah State	7	–	11	.389	16	–	15	.516
Wyoming	7	–	11	.389	14	–	18	.438
Air Force	5	–	13	.278	14	–	18	.438
San Jose State	4	–	14	.222	9	–	22	.290
† Conference tournament winner

The 2015–16 Fresno State Bulldogs men's basketball team represented California State University, Fresno during the 2015–16 NCAA Division I men's basketball season. This was head coach Rodney Terry's fifth season at Fresno State. The Bulldogs played their home games at Save Mart Center and were members of the Mountain West Conference. They finished the season 25–10, 13–5 in Mountain West play to finish in second place. They defeated UNLV, Colorado State and San Diego State to be champions of the Mountain West tournament. They earned the conference's automatic bid to the NCAA tournament, where they lost in the first round to Utah.

== Previous season ==
The Bulldogs finished the season 15–17, 10–8 in Mountain West play to finish in sixth place. They lost in the quarterfinals of the Mountain West tournament to Colorado State.

== Departures ==
Name	Number	Pos.	Height	Weight	Year	Hometown	Reaso for departure
Emmanuel Owootoah	0	G	5'11"	175	Sophomore	Toronto, ON	Graduate transfer to Lynn
Darnell Taylor	1	G	6'3"	205	Junior	Los Angeles, CA	Transferred to Cal State San Marcos
Braeden Anderson	2	F	6'9"	225	RS sophomore	Okotoks, AB	Graduate transfer to Seton Hall
Alex Davis	10	F	6'9"	205	Senior	Houston, TX	Graduated
Blake Williams	13	G	6'2"	197	RS sophomore	Sacramento, CA	Left the team for personal reasons
Isaiah Bailey	24	G	6'6"	190	Freshman	Compton, CA	Dismissed from team for violation of team rules
Eugene Artison	35	F	6'9"	235	Freshman	Seattle, WA	Transferred to College of Southern Idaho

=== Incoming transfers ===
Name	Number	Pos.	Height	Weight	Year	Hometown	Notes
Jaron Hopkins	1	G	6'6"	200	Junior	Mesa, AZ	Transferred from Colorado. Under NCAA transfer rules, Hopkins had to sit out for the 2015–16 season. Had two years of remaining eligibility.
Jahmel Taylor	5	G	6'0"	170	Junior	Los Angeles, CA	Transferred from Washington. Under NCAA transfer rules, Taylor had to sit out for the 2015–16 season. Had two years of remaining eligibility.
Cullen Russo	13	F	6'9"	220	Junior	Bloomington, MN	Junior college transferred from New Mexico Junior College
Lionel Ellison	15	G	6'1"	190	Junior	New Orleans, LA	Junior college transferred from Coffeyville Community College
Deshon Taylor	21	G	6'2"	185	Sophomore	Los Angeles, CA	Transferred from UMKC. Under NCAA transfer rules, Taylor had to sit out for the 2015–16 season. Had three years of remaining eligibility.
Torren Jones	24	F	6'9"	235	Junior	Chandler, AZ	Junior college transferred from Midland College

== Recruiting class of 2015 ==
College recruiting
Name	Hometown	School	Height	Weight	Commit date
Nate Grimes; PF	Las Vegas, NV	Quality Education Academy	6 ft 7 in (2.01 m)	210 lb (95 kg)	Sep 27, 2014
Nate Grimes; PF	Recruit ratings: Scout: Rivals: (75)				
Overall recruit ranking: Scout: – Rivals: –
Note: In many cases, Scout, Rivals, 247Sports, On3, and ESPN may conflict in their listings of height and weight.; In these cases, the average was taken. ESPN grades are on a 100-point scale.; Sources: "Fresno State Commit List for 2015". Rivals.; "Men's Basketball Recruiting". Scout.; "ESPN – Fresno State Bulldogs Basketball Recruiting 2015". ESPN.; "Scout.com Team Recruiting Rankings". Scout.; "2015 Team Ranking". Rivals.

=== Recruiting class of 2016 ===
College recruiting (2016)
Name	Hometown	School	Height	Weight	Commit date
Bryson Williams; PF	Fresno, CA	Roosevelt	6 ft 6 in (1.98 m)	180 lb (82 kg)	Feb 10, 2015
Bryson Williams; PF	Recruit ratings: Scout: Rivals: (73)				
Overall recruit ranking: Scout: – Rivals: –
Note: In many cases, Scout, Rivals, 247Sports, On3, and ESPN may conflict in their listings of height and weight.; In these cases, the average was taken. ESPN grades are on a 100-point scale.; Sources: "Fresno State Commit List for 2016". Rivals.; "Men's Basketball Recruiting". Scout.; "ESPN – Fresno State Bulldogs Basketball Recruiting 2016". ESPN.; "Scout.com Team Recruiting Rankings". Scout.; "2016 Team Ranking". Rivals.

== Roster ==
2015–16 Fresno State Bulldogs men's basketball team
Players
Coaches

Pos.	#	Name	Height	Weight	Year	Previous school	Hometown
G	0	Julien Lewis	6 ft 4 in (1.93 m)	195 lb (88 kg)	RS Sr	La Marque HS; Texas	Galveston, TX
G	1	Jaron Hopkins (I) (redshirt)	6 ft 6 in (1.98 m)	205 lb (93 kg)	Jr	Dobson HS; Colorado	Mesa, AZ
G/F	3	Paul Watson	6 ft 7 in (2.01 m)	210 lb (95 kg)	Jr	Paradise Valley HS	Phoenix, AZ
F	4	Karachi Edo	6 ft 6 in (1.98 m)	230 lb (104 kg)	Jr	Berkner HS	Richardson, TX
G	5	Jahmel Taylor (I) (redshirt)	5 ft 11 in (1.8 m)	175 lb (79 kg)	Jr	Pacific Hills School; Washington	Los Angeles, CA
G	11	Grant Shell (W)	6 ft 3 in (1.91 m)	175 lb (79 kg)	Fr	Burlington HS	Burlington, KS
G	12	Cezar Guerrero	6 ft 1 in (1.85 m)	185 lb (84 kg)	RS Sr	St. John Bosco HS; Oklahoma State	Huntington Park, CA
F	13	Cullen Russo	6 ft 9 in (2.06 m)	225 lb (102 kg)	Jr	Southern Tech Academy; New Mexico JC	Bloomington, MN
G	15	Lionel Ellison III	6 ft 2 in (1.88 m)	195 lb (88 kg)	Jr	Archbishop Shaw HS; Coffeyville CC	New Orleans, LA
G	20	Sam Bittner (W)	6 ft 6 in (1.98 m)	195 lb (88 kg)	Fr	Trinity International HS	Las Vegas, NV
G	23	Marvelle Harris	6 ft 4 in (1.93 m)	210 lb (95 kg)	Sr	Eisenhower HS	Rialto, CA
F	24	Torren Jones	6 ft 9 in (2.06 m)	235 lb (107 kg)	Jr	Basha HS; Midland College	Chandler, AZ
F	32	Nate Grimes	6 ft 8 in (2.03 m)	200 lb (91 kg)	Fr	Quality Education Academy	Las Vegas, NV
C	34	Terrell Carter II	6 ft 9 in (2.06 m)	275 lb (125 kg)	So	Redondo Union HS	Redondo Beach, CA

Head coach

- Rodney Terry (St. Edward's)

Assistant coach(es)

- Jerry Wainwright (Colorado College)
- Byron Jones (Central Oklahoma)
- Kenton Paulino (Texas)

Legend

- (C) Team captain
- (S) Suspended
- (I) Ineligible
- (W) Walk-on
- Injured
- Current redshirt

Roster

== Schedule and results ==
Date time, TV	Rank^{#}	Opponent^{#}	Result	Record	Site (attendance) city, state
Exhibition
11/06/2015*; 7:00 pm		Dominican (CA)	W 77–55		Save Mart Center (4,464); Fresno, CA
Non-conference regular season
11/13/2015*; 7:00 pm		Pepperdine	W 69–66	1–0	Save Mart Center (7,827); Fresno, CA
11/16/2015*; 7:00 pm		Lamar; Roundball Showcase	W 80–72	2–0	Save Mart Center (4,799); Fresno, CA
11/19/2015*; 7:00 pm		San Francisco; Roundball Showcase	W 78–71	3–0	Save Mart Center (5,327); Fresno, CA
11/22/2015*; 3:00 pm		at Rice; Roundball Showcase	W 82–65	4–0	Tudor Fieldhouse (1,749); Houston, TX
11/27/2015*; 7:00 pm		Delaware State; Roundball Showcase	W 80–59	5–0	Save Mart Center (5,959); Fresno, CA
11/30/2015*; 5:00 pm, P12N		at No. 15 Oregon	L 73–78	5–1	Matthew Knight Arena (5,205); Eugene, OR
12/03/2015*; 7:00 pm		The Master's	W 84–72	6–1	Save Mart Center (5,404); Fresno, CA
12/05/2015*; 7:00 pm		at Cal Poly	L 65–77	6–2	Mott Gym (2,861); San Luis Obispo, CA
12/09/2015*; 6:00 pm, P12N		at No. 13 Arizona	L 72–85	6–3	McKale Center (14,262); Tucson, AZ
12/12/2015*; 4:00 pm		Pacific	W 71–52	7–3	Save Mart Center (5,434); Fresno, CA
12/16/2015*; 7:00 pm		Cal State Bakersfield	W 76–68	8–3	Save Mart Center (5,105); Fresno, CA
12/20/2015*; 1:00 pm		Evansville; MW–MVC Challenge	L 77–85	8–4	Save Mart Center (5,251); Fresno, CA
12/27/2015*; 1:00 pm		Pacific Union	W 89–46	9–4	Save Mart Center (6,242); Fresno, CA
Mountain West regular season
12/30/2015; 8:00 pm, ESPNU		at UNLV	W 69–66	10–4 (1–0)	Thomas & Mack Center (12,220); Paradise, NV
01/02/2016; 6:30 pm, CBSSN		New Mexico	L 62–77	10–5 (1–1)	Save Mart Center (6,881); Fresno, CA
01/06/2016; 7:00 pm		Nevada	W 85–63	11–5 (2–1)	Save Mart Center (5,315); Fresno, CA
01/09/2016; 3:00 pm, RTRM		at Boise State	L 70–81	11–6 (2–2)	Taco Bell Arena (8,140); Boise, ID
01/16/2016; 4:00 pm, MWN		San Jose State	W 81–74	12–6 (3–2)	Save Mart Center (6,457); Fresno, CA
01/19/2016; 8:00 pm, ESPNU		at San Diego State	L 67–73 ^{OT}	12–7 (3–3)	Viejas Arena (12,414); San Diego, CA
01/23/2016; 11:00 am, RTRM		at Air Force	W 56–55	13–7 (4–3)	Clune Arena (2,083); Colorado Springs, CO
01/26/2016; 8:00 pm, ESPN3		Wyoming	W 71–60	14–7 (5–3)	Save Mart Center (5,802); Fresno, CA
02/03/2016; 7:00 pm		at San Jose State	L 53–65	14–8 (5–4)	Event Center Arena (2,324); San Jose, CA
02/06/2016; 4:00 pm, ESPN3		UNLV	W 111–104 ^{2OT}	15–8 (6–4)	Save Mart Center (7,754); Fresno, CA
02/10/2016; 8:00 pm, CBSSN		San Diego State	W 58–57	16–8 (7–4)	Save Mart Center (6,476); Fresno, CA
02/13/2016; 4:00 pm, MWN		at Nevada	L 72–77 ^{OT}	16–9 (7–5)	Lawlor Events Center (6,750); Reno, NV
02/17/2016; 7:00 pm, RTRM		at Wyoming	W 79–75	17–9 (8–5)	Arena-Auditorium (4,852); Laramie, WY
02/20/2016; 4:00 pm, RTRM		Utah State	W 75–68	18–9 (9–5)	Save Mart Center (7,068); Fresno, CA
02/24/2016; 7:00 pm, MWN		Air Force	W 64–63	19–9 (10–5)	Save Mart Center (6,284); Fresno, CA
02/27/2016; 7:00 pm, ESPN2		at New Mexico	W 92–82	20–9 (11–5)	The Pit (13,546); Albuquerque, NM
03/02/2016; 8:00 pm, CBSSN		Colorado State	W 87–73	21–9 (12–5)	Save Mart Center (9,948); Fresno, CA
03/05/2016; 6:00 pm, ESPN3		at Utah State	W 86–85	22–9 (13–5)	Smith Spectrum (9,870); Logan, UT
Mountain West tournament
03/10/2016; 6:00 pm, CBSSN	(2)	vs. (7) UNLV; Quarterfinals	W 95–82	23–9	Thomas & Mack Center (6,325); Paradise, NV
03/11/2016; 8:30 pm, CBSSN	(2)	vs. (6) Colorado State; Semifinals	W 64–56	24–9	Thomas & Mack Center (8,036); Paradise, NV
03/12/2016; 3:00 pm, CBS	(2)	vs. (1) San Diego State; Championship	W 68–63	25–9	Thomas & Mack Center (8,132); Paradise, NV
NCAA tournament
03/17/2016*; 5:27 pm, truTV	(14 MW)	vs. (3 MW) No. 13 Utah; First Round	L 69–80	25–10	Pepsi Center (19,500); Denver, CO
*Non-conference game. ^{#}Rankings from AP Poll. (#) Tournament seedings in parentheses. MW=Midwest Region. All times are in Pacific Time.

== See also ==
- 2015–16 Fresno State Bulldogs women's basketball team
