= North Pointe Preparatory =

Location
- 10215 North 43rd Avenue; Phoenix, Arizona 85051; United States; 33.578855°N 112.150486°W

Information
- Type: Charter
- Established: 2001
- Closed: 2023
- Principal: Jody Williamson
- Staff: 50
- Grades: 7 through 12
- Enrollment: 800 (490 high school students, 2010)
- Colors: Purple and black
- Athletics conference: AIA 2A
- Mascot: Falcons

North Pointe Preparatory was a public charter school located in Phoenix, Arizona, that served students in grades 7 through 12.

== History ==
North Pointe Preparatory was established in August 2001, with 130 students in grades 7 through 9. In eight years, it grew to 750 students in grades 7 through 12. The school was founded by four families who wanted a high school that would support parents as they built character and leadership qualities in their teens and be financially accessible to everyone. The Pointe Schools system also contained two elementary schools, Canyon Pointe Academy and Pinnacle Pointe Academy, which both opened in 2002.

In 2023, the Pointe Schools system was closed and the high school was purchased by Heritage Academy, becoming Heritage Academy Pointe. In winter of the 2025 school year, it was announced via Heritage Academy Pointe's website that at the end of the school year, it would be closing due to low enrollment.

The campus in which both institutions were once housed is listed for sale as of March 2026.

== Academics ==
North Pointe Preparatory focused on academics, arts, and athletics, providing secondary education for students who intended to pursue a college education. North Pointe offered dual enrollment and advanced placement classes, which gave students an opportunity to earn college credit while still in high school. It was one of only six public schools in Arizona accredited by the North Central Association of Colleges and Schools as a college preparatory school.

In 2013, the North Pointe Prep Indoor Percussion team took second in WGAZ state championships, this being only their second year competing. In 2015, they took first in the WGAZ Division and state championship.

In 2015, Robotics made it to the top ten in the state.

== Athletics ==
The competitive cheer team at North Pointe competed within the 1A-3A region of the Arizona Interscholastic Association. They were four-time state champions, capturing the title from 2008 through 2011. They have also won several events in those years, including the 2009 West Coast Championship in the small coed division.

In 2012 the JH football team went undefeated and won the championship.

== Community service ==
North Pointe's emphasis on community service was exemplified by its Prep Cares program. In the fall, the school collaborated with US Vets to create a float for the Phoenix Veterans Day Parade, in addition to running several other events honoring members of the armed forces. North Pointe had a food drive every winter and helped stock boxes at local food banks. In the spring, Prep Cares focused on providing mentoring for younger students, as well as working with the American Diabetes Association to help bring awareness to children's diabetes.

== Controversies ==
=== "WTF" shirts ===
In the fall of 2013, the school released shirts which read "We're the Falcons" at the commencement of the School's Old School Spirit Week. The shirts drew attention immediately due to the fact that, in much larger font, the statement was abbreviated "WTF", an obscene phrase. The shirts were reported to the media by a parent who claimed her daughter had been dress coded for wearing a flower headband, although she had only been asked by a teacher to remove it during class and not officially dress coded.

=== Class of 2018 senior purge ===
In September 2017, at the commencement of Old School Spirit Week, the morning announcements opened with the host bound, gagged, and being sprayed with water guns, to which she had previously consented. After the airing of an announcement inspired by "The Purge", the seniors then went around campus spraying other students. After the video was published to Facebook, some parents informed local news channels claiming the prank was in poor taste, with one even likening it to the Columbine massacre. One student was even reported to have sustained injury as an indirect result of slipping on water, although there were some reports that say he had attempted to wrestle a water gun away from one of the seniors. The school released a statement stating that the severity of what had occurred was being exaggerated, and that it was simply a joke.
