= 2015–16 Boise State Broncos men's basketball team =

American college basketball season

2015–16 Boise State Broncos men's basketball
- Conference: Mountain West Conference
- Record: 20–12 (11–7 MW)
- Head coach: Leon Rice (6th season)
- Assistant coaches: Jeff Linder (taking leave of absence); John Rillie; Danny Henderson; Isaac Williams (replacing Linder)
- Home arena: Taco Bell Arena

2015–16 Mountain West Conference men's basketball standings
| | Conf. | | | | Overall |
| Team | W | | L | PCT | W | | L | PCT |
|---|---|---|---|---|---|---|---|---|
| San Diego State | 16 | – | 2 | .889 | 28 | – | 10 | .737 |
| Fresno State † | 13 | – | 5 | .722 | 25 | – | 10 | .714 |
| Boise State | 11 | – | 7 | .611 | 20 | – | 12 | .625 |
| Nevada | 10 | – | 8 | .556 | 24 | – | 14 | .632 |
| New Mexico | 10 | – | 8 | .556 | 17 | – | 15 | .531 |
| Colorado State | 8 | – | 10 | .444 | 18 | – | 16 | .529 |
| UNLV | 8 | – | 10 | .444 | 18 | – | 15 | .545 |
| Utah State | 7 | – | 11 | .389 | 16 | – | 15 | .516 |
| Wyoming | 7 | – | 11 | .389 | 14 | – | 18 | .438 |
| Air Force | 5 | – | 13 | .278 | 14 | – | 18 | .438 |
| San Jose State | 4 | – | 14 | .222 | 9 | – | 22 | .290 |
† Conference tournament winner

The 2015–16 Boise State Broncos men's basketball team represented Boise State University during the 2015–16 NCAA Division I men's basketball season. The Broncos, led by sixth year head coach Leon Rice, played their home games at Taco Bell Arena and were a member of the Mountain West Conference. They finished the season 20–12, 11–7 in Mountain West play to finish in third place. They lost in the first round of the Mountain West tournament to Colorado State. Despite having 20 wins, they did not participate in a postseason tournament after declining an invitation from the inaugural Vegas 16.

== Previous season ==
The Broncos finished the season 25–9, 14–4 in Mountain West play to win a share of the Mountain West regular season championship. They advanced to the semifinals of the Mountain West tournament where they lost to Wyoming. They received an at-large bid to the NCAA tournament where they lost in the First Four to Dayton.

== Departures ==
| Name | Number | Pos. | Height | Weight | Year | Hometown | Notes |
|---|---|---|---|---|---|---|---|
| Dezmyn Trent | 0 | G | 6'4" | 206 | Junior | Tacoma, WA | Dismissed following an arrest |
| Derrick Marks | 2 | G | 6'3" | 204 | Senior | Chicago, IL | Graduated |
| Kevin Allen | 4 | F | 6'11" | 250 | Junior | Ecorse, MI | Transferred to Emporia State |
| Joe Hanstad | 5 | G | 6'4" | 203 | Senior | Dickinson, ND | Graduated |
| Igor Hadziomerovic | 12 | G | 6'4" | 214 | Senior | Melbourne, Australia | Graduated |
| Chris Nealey | 14 | G | 6'2" | 202 | Sophomore | Santa Ana, CA | Left team for personal reasons |
| Rob Heyer | 22 | G/F | 6'3" | 206 | Senior | Worland, WY | Graduated |
| Jake Ness | 34 | F | 6'8" | 225 | Senior | Coeur d'Alene, ID | Graduated |

=== Incoming transfers ===
| Name | Number | Pos. | Height | Weight | Year | Hometown | Notes |
|---|---|---|---|---|---|---|---|
| Lonnie Jackson | 25 | G | 6'4" | 175 | Senior | Valencia, CA | Transferred from Boston College. Will be eligible to play immediately since Jackson graduated from Boston College. |
| James Reid | 55 | G | 6'3" | 200 | Senior | Bend, OR | Transferred from Arkansas–Little Rock. Will sit out 2015–16 due to transfer rules and have one year of eligibility starting in 2016–17. |

== Recruiting ==
College recruiting
| Name | Hometown | School | Height | Weight | Commit date |
|---|---|---|---|---|---|
| Paris Austin; PG | Oakland, CA | Bishop O'Dowd High School | 5 ft 11 in (1.80 m) | 155 lb (70 kg) | Nov 1, 2014 |
| Paris Austin; PG | Recruit ratings: Scout: Rivals: (80) | | | | |
| Malek Harwell; PG | Pocatello, ID | Century High School | 6 ft 3 in (1.91 m) | 175 lb (79 kg) | Sep 14, 2014 |
| Malek Harwell; PG | Recruit ratings: Scout: Rivals: (75) | | | | |
| Robin Jorch; F | Berlin, Germany | | 6 ft 10 in (2.08 m) | 270 lb (120 kg) | Aug 24, 2015 |
| Robin Jorch; F | Recruit ratings: No ratings found | | | | |
Overall recruit ranking: Scout: – Rivals: –
Note: In many cases, Scout, Rivals, 247Sports, On3, and ESPN may conflict in their listings of height and weight.; In these cases, the average was taken. ESPN grades are on a 100-point scale.; Sources: "2015 Team Ranking". Rivals.

== Roster ==
2015–16 Boise State Broncos men's basketball team
Players
Coaches

| Pos. | # | Name | Height | Weight | Year | Previous school | Hometown |
|---|---|---|---|---|---|---|---|
| G | 1 | Mikey Thompson | 6 ft 4 in (1.93 m) | 180 lb (82 kg) | RS Sr | Canyon Springs HS | North Las Vegas, NV |
| G/F | 3 | Anthony Drmic | 6 ft 6 in (1.98 m) | 203 lb (92 kg) | RS Sr | Australian Institute of Sport | Endeavour Hills, Australia |
| G | 5 | Malek Harwell (injured) (redshirt) | 6 ft 4 in (1.93 m) | 190 lb (86 kg) | Fr | Century HS | Pocatello, ID |
| F | 10 | Robin Jorch | 6 ft 10 in (2.08 m) | 250 lb (113 kg) | Fr | International Berlin Basketball Academy | Berlin, Germany |
| F | 11 | Zach Haney | 6 ft 11 in (2.11 m) | 230 lb (104 kg) | RS Fr | Atascocita HS | Humble, TX |
| G | 12 | Collin Landry (W) | 6 ft 3 in (1.91 m) | 180 lb (82 kg) | Fr | Jesuit HS | Portland, Oregon |
| F | 13 | Nicholas Duncan | 6 ft 8 in (2.03 m) | 260 lb (118 kg) | Jr | Australian Institute of Sport | Sydney, AUS |
| F | 15 | Chandler Hutchison | 6 ft 7 in (2.01 m) | 193 lb (88 kg) | So | Mission Viejo HS | Mission Viejo, CA |
| G | 20 | Cody Spjute (W) | 6 ft 4 in (1.93 m) | 195 lb (88 kg) | Fr | Borah HS | Boise, Idaho |
| G | 21 | Montigo Alford | 5 ft 9 in (1.75 m) | 168 lb (76 kg) | Sr | CSI | Bloomington, CA |
| F | 23 | James Webb III | 6 ft 9 in (2.06 m) | 202 lb (92 kg) | RS Jr | North Idaho College | Augusta, GA |
| G | 25 | Lonnie Jackson | 6 ft 4 in (1.93 m) | 178 lb (81 kg) | RS Sr | Boston College | Valencia, CA |
| G | 30 | Paris Austin | 5 ft 11 in (1.8 m) | 180 lb (82 kg) | Fr | Bishop O'Dowd HS | Oakland, CA |
| C | 33 | David Wacker (redshirt) | 6 ft 10 in (2.08 m) | 233 lb (106 kg) | So | Judson HS | Converse, TX |
| G | 55 | James Reid (I) (redshirt) | 6 ft 3 in (1.91 m) | 200 lb (91 kg) | Sr | Arkansas–Little Rock | Bend, OR |

Head coach

- Leon Rice (Washington State)

Assistant coach(es)

- Jeff Linder (Western State)
- John Rillie (Gonzaga)
- Danny Henderson (Austin College)

Legend

- (C) Team captain
- (S) Suspended
- (I) Ineligible
- (W) Walk-on
- Injured
- Current redshirt

Roster

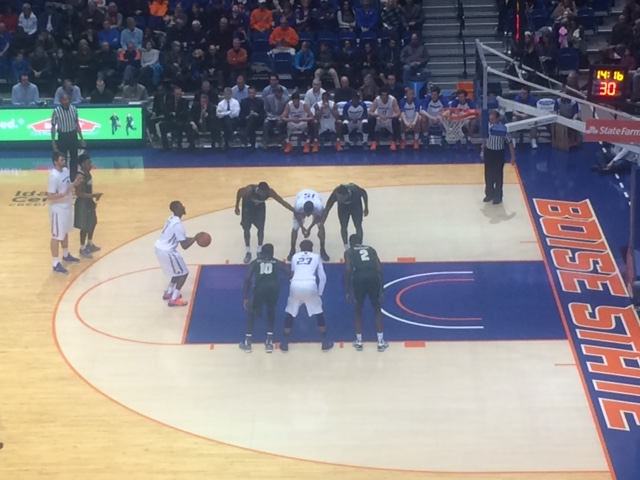
Mikey Thompson attempts a free throw vs. Colorado State on 1/2/16.

== Schedule ==
The Mountain West released their conference schedule on June 24. Games may be moved to accommodate TV. Their full schedule was released on September 15.

| Date time, TV | Opponent | Result | Record | Site (attendance) city, state |
Exhibition
| 11/06/2015*; 8:00 pm | Northwest | W 79–55 | | Taco Bell Arena (4,340); Boise, ID |
Non-conference regular season
| 11/13/2015*; 7:00 pm | at Montana | L 72–74 | 0–1 | Dahlberg Arena (5,421); Missoula, MT |
| 11/16/2015*; 7:00 pm, RTNW | Northern Arizona | W 101–81 | 1–1 | Taco Bell Arena (4,489); Boise, ID |
| 11/19/2015*; 6:30 pm, P12N | at No. 12 Arizona; Wooden Legacy | L 76–88 | 1–2 | McKale Center (14,644); Tucson, AZ |
| 11/23/2015*; 7:00 pm | Concordia (OR) | W 100–53 | 2–2 | Taco Bell Arena (3,397); Boise, ID |
| 11/26/2015*; 2:00 pm, ESPNU | vs. UC Irvine; Wooden Legacy quarterfinals | W 71–64 | 3–2 | Titan Gym (2,341); Fullerton, CA |
| 11/27/2015*; 3:30 pm, ESPN2 | vs. No. 3 Michigan State; Wooden Legacy semifinals | L 67–77 | 3–3 | Titan Gym (3,173); Fullerton, CA |
| 11/29/2015*; 3:00 pm, ESPNU | vs. No. 11 Arizona; Wooden Legacy 3rd place game | L 59–68 | 3–4 | Honda Center (4,393); Anaheim, CA |
| 12/02/2015*; 7:00 pm | Willamette | W 100–36 | 4–4 | Taco Bell Arena (3,426); Boise, ID |
| 12/05/2015*; 8:00 pm, theW.tv | at Portland | W 81–71 | 5–4 | Chiles Center (2,282); Portland, OR |
| 12/09/2015*; 7:00 pm | Loyola Marymount | W 67–66 | 6–4 | Taco Bell Arena (4,151); Boise, ID |
| 12/12/2015*; 5:00 pm, CBSSN | No. 24 Oregon | W 74–72 | 7–4 | Taco Bell Arena (10,239); Boise, ID |
| 12/20/2015*; 12:00 pm, RTNW | Bradley; MWC–MVC Challenge | W 90–70 | 8–4 | Taco Bell Arena (4,405); Boise, ID |
| 12/30/2015*; 7:00 pm | UC Davis | W 64–56 | 9–4 | Taco Bell Arena (5,592); Boise, ID |
Mountain West regular season
| 01/02/2016; 5:00 pm, ESPN3 | Colorado State | W 84–80 | 10–4 (1–0) | Taco Bell Arena (6,749); Boise, ID |
| 01/05/2016; 8:00 pm, CBSSN | at Utah State | W 76–61 | 11–4 (2–0) | Smith Spectrum (8,330); Logan, UT |
| 01/09/2016; 4:00 pm, RTNW | Fresno State | W 81–70 | 12–4 (3–0) | Taco Bell Arena (8,140); Boise, ID |
| 01/13/2016; 8:00 pm, MWN | at Nevada | W 74–67 | 13–4 (4–0) | Lawlor Events Center (7,564); Reno, NV |
| 01/16/2016; 8:00 pm, ESPN2 | San Diego State | L 53–56 | 13–5 (4–1) | Taco Bell Arena (10,421); Boise, ID |
| 01/20/2016; 7:00 pm | San Jose State | W 94–69 | 14–5 (5–1) | Taco Bell Arena (5,992); Boise, ID |
| 01/23/2016; 2:00 pm, ESPN3 | at Wyoming | W 81–71 | 15–5 (6–1) | Arena-Auditorium (6,091); Laramie, WY |
| 01/27/2016; 9:00 pm, CBSSN | at UNLV | L 77–87 | 15–6 (6–2) | Thomas & Mack Center (12,586); Paradise, NV |
| 01/30/2016; 3:00 pm, ESPN3 | New Mexico | L 83–88 | 15–7 (6–3) | Taco Bell Arena (7,355); Boise, ID |
| 02/02/2016; 7:00 pm, ESPN3 | Utah State | W 70–67 | 16–7 (7–3) | Taco Bell Arena (5,544); Boise, ID |
| 02/06/2016; 12:00 pm, RTNW | at Air Force | L 53–61 | 16–8 (7–4) | Clune Arena (2,097); Colorado Springs, CO |
| 02/10/2016; 7:00 pm, ESPN3 | at Colorado State | L 93–97 ^{2OT} | 16–9 (7–5) | Moby Arena; Fort Collins, CO |
| 02/13/2016; 2:00 pm, CBSSN | Wyoming | W 94–71 | 17–9 (8–5) | Taco Bell Arena (7,334); Boise, ID |
| 02/17/2016; 8:00 pm, CBSSN | at New Mexico | L 78–80 | 17–10 (8–6) | The Pit (12,434); Albuquerque, NM |
| 02/23/2016; 9:00 pm, ESPNU | UNLV | W 81–69 | 18–10 (9–6) | Taco Bell Arena (4,605); Boise, ID |
| 02/27/2016; 4:00 pm, CBSSN | at San Diego State | W 66–63 | 19–10 (10–6) | Viejas Arena (12,414); San Diego, CA |
| 03/02/2016; 7:00 pm, MWN | Nevada | W 76–57 | 20–10 (11–6) | Taco Bell Arena (8,495); Boise, ID |
| 03/05/2016; 3:00 pm, MWN | at San Jose State | L 63–68 | 20–11 (11–7) | Event Center Arena (1,759); San Jose, CA |
Mountain West tournament
| 03/10/2016; 9:30 pm, CBSSN | vs. Colorado State; Quarterfinals | L 81–88 | 20–12 | Thomas & Mack Center (6,325); Paradise, NV |
*Non-conference game. ^{#}Rankings from AP Poll. (#) Tournament seedings in parentheses. All times are in Mountain Time.
