= 2015–16 Coppin State Eagles men's basketball team =

American college basketball season

2015–16 Coppin State Eagles men's basketball
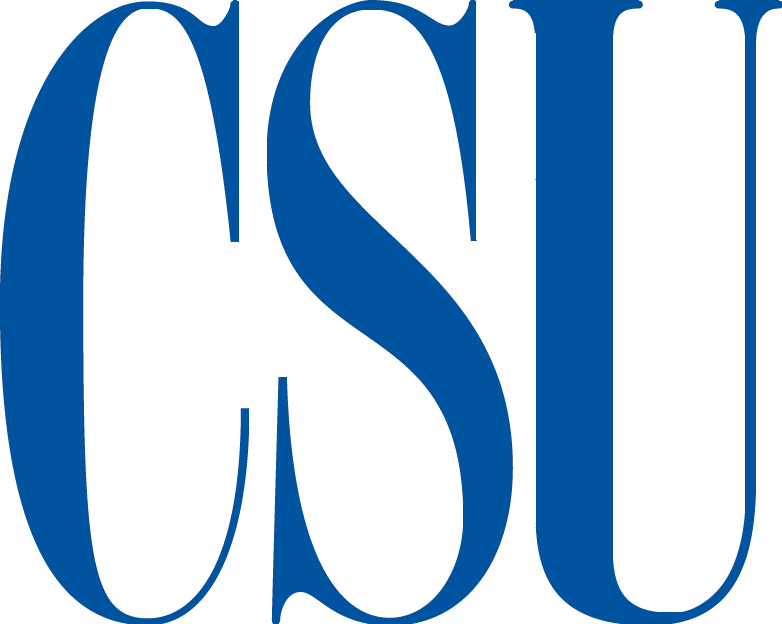
- Conference: Mid-Eastern Athletic Conference
- Record: 9–22 (6–10 MEAC)
- Head coach: Michael Grant (2nd season)
- Assistant coaches: Elwyn McRoy; Jake Morton; Jay McMillian
- Home arena: Physical Education Complex

2015–16 MEAC men's basketball standings
	Conf.				Overall
Team	W		L	PCT	W		L	PCT
Hampton †	13	–	3	.813	21	–	11	.656
South Carolina State	12	–	4	.750	19	–	15	.559
Norfolk State	12	–	4	.750	17	–	17	.500
Bethune–Cookman	10	–	6	.625	14	–	18	.438
Savannah State	9	–	7	.563	16	–	16	.500
North Carolina Central	7	–	9	.438	13	–	19	.406
North Carolina A&T	7	–	9	.438	10	–	22	.313
Md. Eastern Shore	7	–	9	.438	10	–	22	.313
Howard	6	–	10	.375	12	–	20	.375
Morgan State	6	–	10	.375	9	–	22	.290
Coppin State	6	–	10	.375	9	–	22	.290
Delaware State	5	–	11	.313	7	–	25	.219
Florida A&M*	4	–	12	.250	8	–	21	.276
† 2016 MEAC tournament winner *ineligible for postseason due to APR violations As of March 18, 2016

The 2015–16 Coppin State Eagles men's basketball team represented Coppin State University during the 2015–16 NCAA Division I men's basketball season. The Eagles, led by second year head coach Michael Grant, played their home games at the Physical Education Complex and were members of the Mid-Eastern Athletic Conference. They finished the season 9–22, 6–10 in MEAC play to finish in a three way tie for ninth place. They defeated North Carolina A&T in the first round of the MEAC tournament to advance to the quarterfinals where they lost to South Carolina State.

== Roster ==
Number	Name	Position	Height	Weight	Year	Hometown
1	Trevon Seymore	Forward	6–4	170	Junior	Waterbury, Connecticut
2	Lawrence Fejokwu	Center	6–9	218	Senior	Lagos, Nigeria
3	Joshua Treadwell	Forward	6–5	205	Junior	Newark, New Jersey
5	James Sylvester	Guard	6–0	170	Junior	Toronto, Ontario, Canada
10	Christian Kessee	Guard	6–2	180	Junior	Las Vegas, Nevada
12	Terry Harris, Jr.	Forward	6–8	205	Junior	Baltimore, Maryland
15	Blake Simpson	Forward	6–7	230	Sophomore	Cincinnati, Ohio
20	Derek Armstrong	Guard	6–0	175	Freshman	Hempstead, New York
21	Lucian Brownlee	Guard	6–2	165	Freshman	Lawnside, New Jersey
22	Keith Shivers	Guard	6–4	195	Junior	Upper Marlboro, Maryland
24	Izais Hicks	Forward	6–8	200	Junior	Staten Island, New York
32	Mufaro Murinda	Forward	6–7	195	Junior	Pomona, California
54	Jerimyiah Batts	Forward	6–8	265	Junior	Jenkintown, Pennsylvania

== Schedule ==
Date time, TV	Rank^{#}	Opponent^{#}	Result	Record	Site (attendance) city, state
Regular season
11/13/2015*; 7:00 pm		at Eastern Kentucky	L 80–107	0–1	McBrayer Arena (2,300); Richmond, KY
11/15/2015*; 5:00 pm, BTN		at Iowa	L 68–103	0–2	Carver–Hawkeye Arena (12,350); Iowa City, IA
11/18/2015*; 12:00 pm		Goldey–Beacom	W 80–73	1–2	Physical Education Complex (1,213); Baltimore, MD
11/23/2015*; 7:30 pm		Chestnut Hill	W 92–75	2–2	Physical Education Complex (560); Baltimore, MD
11/28/2015*; 4:00 pm		Towson	L 77–81	2–3	Physical Education Complex (1,201); Baltimore, MD
12/02/2015*; 8:00 pm		at Akron	L 71–77	2–4	James A. Rhodes Arena (2,903); Akron, OH
12/05/2015; 4:00 pm		Hampton	L 71–74	2–5 (0–1)	Physical Education Complex (768); Baltimore, MD
12/07/2015; 7:30 pm		Norfolk State	L 56–88	2–6 (0–2)	Physical Education Complex (588); Baltimore, MD
12/09/2015*; 8:00 pm, FSKC		at Kansas State	L 58–83	2–7	Bramlage Coliseum (11,409); Manhattan, KS
12/12/2015*; 1:00 pm		at Fordham	L 55–92	2–8	Rose Hill Gymnasium (1,331); Bronx, NY
12/18/2015*; 10:00 pm		at San Francisco	L 93–96 ^{OT}	2–9	War Memorial Gymnasium (1,142); San Francisco, CA
12/19/2015*; 7:00 pm, P12N		at California	L 51–84	2–10	Haas Pavilion (9,437); Berkeley, CA
12/21/2015*; 7:00 pm		Eastern Michigan	L 62–73	2–11	Physical Education Complex (813); Baltimore, MD
12/28/2015*; 9:00 pm, FS1		at Creighton	L 77–102	2–12	CenturyLink Center Omaha (17,137); Omaha, NE
12/30/2015*; 8:00 pm, FS1		at No. 11 Iowa State	L 84–104	2–13	Hilton Coliseum (14,384); Ames, IA
01/09/2016; 4:00 pm		at Howard	L 63–72	2–14 (0–3)	Burr Gymnasium (1,502); Washington, D.C.
01/16/2016; 4:00 pm		at Bethune-Cookman	W 62–54	3–14 (1–3)	Moore Gymnasium (698); Daytona Beach, FL
01/18/2016; 8:00 pm		at Florida A&M	W 70–66	4–14 (2–3)	Teaching Gym (Florida A&M) (2,789); Tallahassee, FL
01/27/2016; 7:30 pm		North Carolina A&T; Postponed from 1/23/16	W 73–68	5–14 (3–3)	Physical Education Complex (443); Baltimore, MD
01/30/2016; 4:00 pm		Maryland Eastern Shore	L 81–83 ^{OT}	5–15 (3–4)	Physical Education Complex (455); Baltimore, MD
02/01/2016; 7:30 pm		at Morgan State	L 43–83	5–16 (3–5)	Talmadge L. Hill Field House (3,878); Baltimore, MD
02/06/2016; 4:00 pm		at South Carolina State	L 83–88	5–17 (3–6)	SHM Memorial Center (403); Orangeburg, SC
02/08/2016; 8:00 pm		at Savannah State	L 63–72	5–18 (3–7)	Tiger Arena (1,211); Savannah, GA
02/13/2016; 4:00 pm		Howard	W 90–66	6–18 (4–7)	Physical Education Complex (1,200); Baltimore, MD
02/15/2016; 7:30 pm		Delaware State	L 67–71	6–19 (4–8)	Physical Education Complex (533); Baltimore, MD
02/18/2016; 7:30 pm		North Carolina Central; Postponed from 1/25/16	W 71–60	7–19 (5–8)	Physical Education Complex; Baltimore, MD
02/22/2016; 4:00 pm, ESPNU		at Norfolk State	L 77–85	7–20 (5–9)	Joseph G. Echols Memorial Hall (2,083); Norfolk, VA
02/27/2016; 4:00 pm		Morgan State; Homecoming	L 72–74 ^{OT}	7–21 (5–10)	Physical Education Complex (2,887); Baltimore, MD
03/03/2016; 7:30 pm		at Delaware State	W 72–62	8–21 (6–10)	Memorial Hall (1,236); Dover, DE
MEAC tournament
03/07/2016; 7:00 pm, ESPN3	(11)	vs. (6) North Carolina A&T; First round	W 98–91 ^{2OT}	9–21	Norfolk Scope; Norfolk, VA
03/10/2016; 6:00 pm, ESPN3	(11)	vs. (3) South Carolina State; Quarterfinals	L 80–90	9–22	Norfolk Scope; Norfolk, Virginia
*Non-conference game. ^{#}Rankings from AP Poll. (#) Tournament seedings in parentheses. All times are in Eastern Time.
