= 2015–16 Maryland Eastern Shore Hawks men's basketball team =

American college basketball season

2015–16 Maryland Eastern Shore Hawks men's basketball
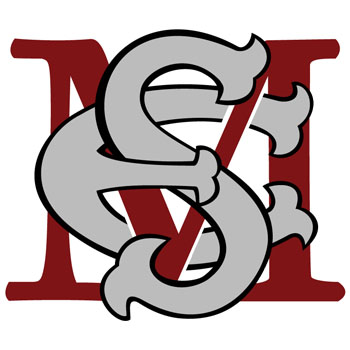
- Conference: Mid-Eastern Athletic Conference
- Record: 10–22 (7–9 MEAC)
- Head coach: Bobby Collins (2nd season)
- Assistant coaches: Clifford Reed; Ace Custis; Trevor Deloach
- Home arena: Hytche Athletic Center

2015–16 MEAC men's basketball standings
| | Conf. | | | | Overall |
| Team | W | | L | PCT | W | | L | PCT |
|---|---|---|---|---|---|---|---|---|
| Hampton † | 13 | – | 3 | .813 | 21 | – | 11 | .656 |
| South Carolina State | 12 | – | 4 | .750 | 19 | – | 15 | .559 |
| Norfolk State | 12 | – | 4 | .750 | 17 | – | 17 | .500 |
| Bethune–Cookman | 10 | – | 6 | .625 | 14 | – | 18 | .438 |
| Savannah State | 9 | – | 7 | .563 | 16 | – | 16 | .500 |
| North Carolina Central | 7 | – | 9 | .438 | 13 | – | 19 | .406 |
| North Carolina A&T | 7 | – | 9 | .438 | 10 | – | 22 | .313 |
| Md. Eastern Shore | 7 | – | 9 | .438 | 10 | – | 22 | .313 |
| Howard | 6 | – | 10 | .375 | 12 | – | 20 | .375 |
| Morgan State | 6 | – | 10 | .375 | 9 | – | 22 | .290 |
| Coppin State | 6 | – | 10 | .375 | 9 | – | 22 | .290 |
| Delaware State | 5 | – | 11 | .313 | 7 | – | 25 | .219 |
| Florida A&M* | 4 | – | 12 | .250 | 8 | – | 21 | .276 |
† 2016 MEAC tournament winner *ineligible for postseason due to APR violations As of March 18, 2016

The 2015–16 Maryland Eastern Shore Hawks men's basketball team represented the University of Maryland Eastern Shore during the 2015–16 NCAA Division I men's basketball season. The Hawks, led by second year head coach Bobby Collins, played their home games at the Hytche Athletic Center and were members of the Mid-Eastern Athletic Conference. They finished the season 10–22, 7–9 in MEAC play to finish in a three-way tie for sixth place. They lost in the first round of the MEAC tournament to Morgan State.

== Roster ==
| Number | Name | Position | Height | Weight | Year | Hometown |
|---|---|---|---|---|---|---|
| 0 | Ryan Andino | Guard | 6–2 | 175 | Sophomore | Ft. Lauderdale, Florida |
| 1 | Marc Seylan | Forward | 6–4 | 190 | Junior | Paris, France |
| 2 | Thomas Rivera | Guard | 5–11 | 165 | Junior | Harlem, New York |
| 3 | Mark Blackmon | Guard | 5–9 | 175 | Junior | Charlotte, North Carolina |
| 4 | Devin Martin | Guard | 6–4 | 205 | Senior | Baltimore, Maryland |
| 5 | Stephen Spurlock | Guard/Forward | 6–6 | 215 | Sophomore | Dallas, Texas |
| 10 | Maurice Coleman | Guard | 6–1 | 160 | Freshman | Richmond, Virginia |
| 11 | Ahmad Frost | Guard | 6–0 | 190 | Freshman | Cincinnati, Ohio |
| 12 | Shane Randall | Guard | 6–5 | 210 | Junior | Philadelphia, Pennsylvania |
| 15 | Isaac Sutton | Guard | 6–1 | 230 | Freshman | Tallahassee, Florida |
| 20 | Dontae Caldwell | Guard | 6–5 | 195 | Freshman | Los Angeles, California |
| 21 | Bakari Copeland | Guard | 6–6 | 235 | Junior | Decatur, Georgia |
| 24 | Derrico Peck | Forward | 6–7 | 200 | Senior | Atlanta, Georgia |
| 25 | Joshu's Warren | Forward | 6–8 | 245 | Senior | Marietta, Georgia |
| 32 | Dominique Elliott | Forward | 6–8 | 260 | Senior | Savannah, Georgia |
| 35 | Isaac Taylor | Forward | 6–8 | 250 | Freshman | Wachapreague, Virginia |

== Schedule ==
| Date time, TV | Rank^{#} | Opponent^{#} | Result | Record | Site (attendance) city, state |
Regular season
| 11/13/2015*; 7:00 pm, FSKC | | at Kansas State; CBE Hall of Fame Classic | L 53–80 | 0–1 | Bramlage Coliseum; Manhattan, KS |
| 11/15/2015*; 6:00 pm, SECN | | at Missouri; CBE Hall of Fame Classic | L 55–73 | 0–2 | Mizzou Arena (5,082); Columbia, MO |
| 11/21/2015*; 12:00 pm | | at Wofford; CBE Hall of Fame Classic | L 63–73 | 0–3 | Benjamin Johnson Arena (1,970); Spartanburg, SC |
| 11/24/2015*; 7:30 pm | | Fairfield; CBE Hall of Fame Classic | L 74–113 | 0–4 | Hytche Athletic Center (846); Princess Anne, MD |
| 11/27/2015*; 4:00 pm | | Saint Francis (PA) | W 70–57 | 1–4 | Hytche Athletic Center (428); Princess Anne, MD |
| 12/01/2015*; 7:00 pm, FS1 | | at Georgetown | L 49–68 | 1–5 | Verizon Center (4,062); Washington, D.C. |
| 12/05/2015; 4:00 pm | | at North Carolina Central | L 59–70 | 1–6 (0–1) | McLendon–McDougald Gymnasium (1,056); Durham, NC |
| 12/07/2015; 7:30 pm | | at North Carolina A&T | L 74–80 | 1–7 (0–2) | Corbett Sports Center (1,094); Greensboro, NC |
| 12/09/2015*; 7:00 pm, BTN | | at No. 1 Michigan State | L 35–78 | 1–8 | Breslin Student Events Center (14,797); East Lansing, MI |
| 12/12/2015*; 4:15 pm, BTN | | at No. 6 Maryland | L 56–77 | 1–9 | Xfinity Center (17,950); College Park, MD |
| 12/18/2015*; 8:00 pm, ASN | | at Old Dominion | L 47–77 | 1–10 | Ted Constant Convocation Center (5,825); Norfolk, VA |
| 12/20/2015*; 1:00 pm, CSNMA | | at American | W 79–64 | 2–10 | Bender Arena (826); Washington, D.C. |
| 12/22/2015*; 4:00 pm | | Central Penn | W 115–86 | 3–10 | Hytche Athletic Center (403); Princess Anne, MD |
| 12/29/2015*; 7:00 pm | | at Saint Joseph's | L 68–78 | 3–11 | Hagan Arena (3,721); Philadelphia, PA |
| 12/31/2015*; 1:00 pm | | at UMBC | L 78–89 | 3–12 | Retriever Activities Center (1,231); Baltimore, MD |
| 01/02/2016*; 4:00 pm, ESPN3 | | at Pittsburgh | L 58–92 | 3–13 | Petersen Events Center (8,649); Pittsburgh, PA |
| 01/06/2016*; 7:00 pm | | at Columbia | L 75–81 | 3–14 | Levien Gymnasium (868); New York City, NY |
| 01/11/2016; 7:30 pm | | Morgan State | W 69–65 | 4–14 (1–2) | Hytche Athletic Center (671); Princess Anne, MD |
| 01/16/2016; 4:00 pm | | at Savannah State | L 61–68 | 4–15 (1–3) | Tiger Arena (930); Savannah, GA |
| 01/18/2016; 7:30 pm | | at South Carolina State | L 63–68 | 4–16 (1–4) | SHM Memorial Center (613); Orangeburg, SC |
| 01/23/2016; 4:00 pm | | Bethune-Cookman | W 74–72 | 5–16 (2–4) | Hytche Athletic Center (932); Princess Anne, MD |
| 01/30/2016; 4:00 pm | | at Coppin State | W 83–81 ^{OT} | 6–16 (3–4) | Physical Education Complex; Baltimore, MD |
| 02/01/2016; 7:30 pm, ESPNU | | Howard | W 85–67 | 7–16 (4–4) | Hytche Athletic Center (3,122); Princess Anne, MD |
| 02/06/2016; 4:00 pm | | Hampton | W 73–70 | 8–16 (5–4) | Hytche Athletic Center (2,173); Princess Anne, MD |
| 02/08/2016; 7:30 pm | | Norfolk State | L 70–76 | 8–17 (5–5) | Hytche Athletic Center (2,810); Princess Anne, MD |
| 02/13/2016; 4:00 pm | | at Delaware State | L 71–75 | 8–18 (5–6) | Memorial Hall (1,983); Dover, DE |
| 02/16/2016; 7:00 pm | | at Howard | L 74–77 | 8–19 (5–7) | Burr Gymnasium (3,000); Washington, D.C. |
| 02/20/2016; 4:00 pm | | South Carolina State | L 58–62 | 8–20 (5–8) | Hytche Athletic Center (5,064); Princess Anne, MD |
| 02/22/2016; 7:30 pm | | Florida A&M; Postponed from 1/25/16 | L 80–81 ^{2OT} | 8–21 (5–9) | Hytche Athletic Center (1,134); Princess Anne, MD |
| 02/27/2016; 4:00 pm | | Delaware State | W 74–65 | 9–21 (6–9) | Hytche Athletic Center (3,002); Princess Anne, MD |
| 03/03/2016; 7:30 pm | | at Morgan State | W 80–71 | 10–21 (7–9) | Talmadge L. Hill Field House (1,126); Baltimore, MD |
MEAC tournament
| 03/08/2016; 4:00 pm, ESPN3 | (8) | vs. (9) Morgan State | L 58–65 | 10–22 | Norfolk Scope; Norfolk, VA |
*Non-conference game. ^{#}Rankings from AP Poll. (#) Tournament seedings in parentheses. All times are in Eastern Time.
