= 2015–16 North Carolina A&T Aggies men's basketball team =

American college basketball season

2015–16 North Carolina A&T Aggies men's basketball
- Conference: Mid-Eastern Athletic Conference
- Record: 10–22 (7–9 MEAC)
- Head coach: Cy Alexander (4th season)
- Assistant coaches: Jay Joyner (interim HC); Jamal Brown; Darren Corbett
- Home arena: Corbett Sports Center

2015–16 MEAC men's basketball standings
| | Conf. | | | | Overall |
| Team | W | | L | PCT | W | | L | PCT |
|---|---|---|---|---|---|---|---|---|
| Hampton † | 13 | – | 3 | .813 | 21 | – | 11 | .656 |
| South Carolina State | 12 | – | 4 | .750 | 19 | – | 15 | .559 |
| Norfolk State | 12 | – | 4 | .750 | 17 | – | 17 | .500 |
| Bethune–Cookman | 10 | – | 6 | .625 | 14 | – | 18 | .438 |
| Savannah State | 9 | – | 7 | .563 | 16 | – | 16 | .500 |
| North Carolina Central | 7 | – | 9 | .438 | 13 | – | 19 | .406 |
| North Carolina A&T | 7 | – | 9 | .438 | 10 | – | 22 | .313 |
| Md. Eastern Shore | 7 | – | 9 | .438 | 10 | – | 22 | .313 |
| Howard | 6 | – | 10 | .375 | 12 | – | 20 | .375 |
| Morgan State | 6 | – | 10 | .375 | 9 | – | 22 | .290 |
| Coppin State | 6 | – | 10 | .375 | 9 | – | 22 | .290 |
| Delaware State | 5 | – | 11 | .313 | 7 | – | 25 | .219 |
| Florida A&M* | 4 | – | 12 | .250 | 8 | – | 21 | .276 |
† 2016 MEAC tournament winner *ineligible for postseason due to APR violations As of March 18, 2016

The 2015–16 North Carolina A&T Aggies men's basketball team represented North Carolina Agricultural and Technical State University during the 2015–16 NCAA Division I men's basketball season. The Aggies were led by fourth-year head coach Cy Alexander. Alexander resigned as head on January 26, 2016. Assistant coach Jay Joyner took over on interim basis. They played their home games at the Corbett Sports Center and were members of the Mid-Eastern Athletic Conference. They finished the season 10–22, 7–9 record in MEAC play to finish in a three-way tie for sixth place. They lost to Coppin State in the first round of the MEAC tournament.

On March 7, the interim tag was removed and Joyner was named head coach.

== Previous season ==
The Aggies finished the season 9-23, 6-10 in MEAC play to finish in tenth place. On July 10, 2015, it was announced that Jamal Brown was hired as an assistant coach.

== Departures ==
| Name | Number | Pos. | Height | Weight | Year | Hometown | Notes |
|---|---|---|---|---|---|---|---|
| Bryan Akinkugbe | 5 | C | 6'9" | 225 | Senior | Bowie, MD | Graduated |
| Waylan Siverand | 33 | G | 6'7" | 190 | Senior | Houston, TX | Graduated |
| Jerome Simmons | 0 | C/F | 6'8" | 225 | Sophomore | Jacksonville, NC | Transferred to Winston-Salem State (DIV-II) |
| Trey Brown | 1 | G | 6'3" | 195 | Junior | | Left the Team |

== Class of 2015 signees ==
College recruiting information
| Name | Hometown | School | Height | Weight | Commit date |
|---|---|---|---|---|---|
| Ede Egharevba | Queens, NY | Albany University | 6 ft 6 in (1.98 m) | 210 lb (95 kg) | Jul 28, 2015 |
| Ede Egharevba | Recruit ratings: No ratings found | | | | |
| Deion James; SF | Tucson, AZ | Empire HS | 6 ft 8 in (2.03 m) | 205 lb (93 kg) | Mar 9, 2015 |
| Deion James; SF | Recruit ratings: No ratings found | | | | |
| Mike Owona | Bel Air, MD | Northwest Kansas Technical College | 6 ft 9 in (2.06 m) | 250 lb (110 kg) | Jul 28, 2015 |
| Mike Owona | Recruit ratings: No ratings found | | | | |
| Joshea Singleton | Kinston, NC | Bucknell University | 6 ft 4 in (1.93 m) | 211 lb (96 kg) | Jul 28, 2015 |
| Joshea Singleton | Recruit ratings: No ratings found | | | | |
Overall recruit ranking:
Note: In many cases, Scout, Rivals, 247Sports, On3, and ESPN may conflict in their listings of height and weight.; In these cases, the average was taken. ESPN grades are on a 100-point scale.; Sources: "2015 Team Ranking". Rivals.

== Roster ==
2015–16 North Carolina A&T Aggies men's basketball team
Players
Coaches

| Pos. | # | Name | Height | Weight | Year | Previous school | Hometown |
|---|---|---|---|---|---|---|---|
| F | 1 | Joshea Singleton | 6 ft 4 in (1.93 m) | 211 lb (96 kg) | GS | Kestrel Heights School | Kinston, North Carolina |
| G | 2 | Sam Hunt | 6 ft 2 in (1.88 m) | 175 lb (79 kg) | RS So | Jacksonville Univ | Greensboro, North Carolina |
| F | 3 | Ede Egharevba | 6 ft 6 in (1.98 m) | 210 lb (95 kg) | RS So | Mack Prep Academy | Queens, New York |
| F | 4 | Nick Reese | 6 ft 7 in (2.01 m) | 211 lb (96 kg) | RS So | Westchester | Los Angeles, California |
| F | 5 | Jamin Lackey | 6 ft 8 in (2.03 m) | 200 lb (91 kg) | RS So | Los Angeles Valley CC | Los Angeles, California |
| G | 10 | Arturs Bremers | 6 ft 3 in (1.91 m) | 195 lb (88 kg) | Sr | Columbia State CC | Sigulda, Latvia |
| G | 11 | James Whitaker | 6 ft 5 in (1.96 m) | 180 lb (82 kg) | RS So | I.C. Norcom | Portsmouth, Virginia |
| G | 12 | Ahmad Abdullah | 6 ft 0 in (1.83 m) | 175 lb (79 kg) | Sr | Knightdale HS | Raleigh, North Carolina |
| G | 13 | Austin Williams | 6 ft 1 in (1.85 m) | 175 lb (79 kg) | So | Believe Prep Academy | Queens, New York |
| F | 15 | Amari Hamilton | 6 ft 4 in (1.93 m) | 211 lb (96 kg) | So | Southern Durham HS | Durham, North Carolina |
| G/F | 20 | Deion James | 6 ft 8 in (2.03 m) | 205 lb (93 kg) | Fr | Empire HS | Tucson, Arizona |
| F | 21 | Julien Johnson | 6 ft 4 in (1.93 m) | 185 lb (84 kg) | Sr | Manteo HS | Nags Head, North Carolina |
| G | 23 | Denzel Keyes | 6 ft 4 in (1.93 m) | 210 lb (95 kg) | Jr | Kinston HS | Kinston, North Carolina |
| F/C | 24 | Mike Owona | 6 ft 9 in (2.06 m) | 250 lb (113 kg) | Jr | NW Kansas Tech | Bel Air, Maryland |
| F | 32 | Bruce Beckford | 6 ft 7 in (2.01 m) | 210 lb (95 kg) | Jr | Montrose Christian Academy | Silver Spring, Maryland |
| F | 34 | Khary Doby | 6 ft 6 in (1.98 m) | 206 lb (93 kg) | Jr | Riverdale Baptist HS | Upper Marlboro, Maryland |
| C | 44 | Steven Burrough | 6 ft 9 in (2.06 m) | 245 lb (111 kg) | Jr | Harding University HS | Charlotte, North Carolina |

Head coach

- Cy Alexander (Catawba)

Assistant coach(es)

- Jay Joyner (South Carolina State)
- Jamal Brown (South Carolina State)
- Darren Corbett (North Carolina A&T)

Legend

- (C) Team captain
- (S) Suspended
- (I) Ineligible
- (W) Walk-on
- Injured
- Current redshirt

Roster
Last update: January 09, 2016

== Schedule ==
| Date time, TV | Rank^{#} | Opponent^{#} | Result | Record | Site (attendance) city, state |
Regular season
| 11/13/2015*; 7:00 pm | | at Purdue; Hall of Fame Tip Off Classic | L 40–81 | 0–1 | Mackey Arena (1,057); West Lafayette, IN |
| 11/16/2015*; 8:00 pm, SECN+ | | at Florida; Hall of Fame Tip Off Classic | L 54–104 | 0–2 | O'Connell Center (8,605); Gainesville, FL |
| 11/18/2015*; 7:00 pm | | Roanoke College | L 87–94 | 0–3 | Corbett Sports Center (643); Greensboro, NC |
| 11/21/2015*; 7:30 pm | | vs. Buffalo; Hall of Fame Tip Off | L 68–86 | 0–4 | Mohegan Sun Arena (4,507); Uncasville, CT |
| 11/22/2015*; 7:00 pm | | vs. Niagara; Hall of Fame Tip Off | L 72–73 | 0–5 | Mohegan Sun Arena (3,813); Uncasville, CT |
| 11/24/2015*; 7:00 pm, ESPN3 | | at Virginia Tech | L 60–90 | 0–6 | Cassell Coliseum (4,464); Blacksburg, VA |
| 11/28/2015*; 1:00 pm | | at North Dakota State | L 56–77 | 0–7 | Scheels Arena (2,052); Fargo, ND |
| 11/30/2015*; 7:00 pm | | Northern Kentucky | W 74–63 | 1–7 | Corbett Sports Center (546); Greensboro, NC |
| 12/02/2015*; 7:30 pm | | UNC Greensboro | W 77–68 | 2–7 | Corbett Sports Center (1,832); Greensboro, NC |
| 12/05/2015; 4:00 pm | | Howard | W 66–63 | 3–7 (1–0) | Corbett Sports Center (1,638); Greensboro, NC |
| 12/07/2015; 7:30 pm | | Maryland Eastern Shore | W 80–74 | 4–7 (2–0) | Corbett Sports Center (1,094); Greensboro, NC |
| 12/13/2015*; 2:30 pm, ESPN3 | | at East Carolina | L 60–71 | 4–8 | Williams Arena (4,151); Greenville, NC |
| 12/17/2015*; 7:00 pm | | Grambling State | W 61–47 | 5–8 | Corbett Sports Center (467); Greensboro, NC |
| 12/21/2015*; 7:00 pm | | at Toledo | L 62–95 | 5–9 | Savage Arena (4,006); Toledo, OH |
| 12/30/2015*; 4:00 pm | | Kent State | L 60–61 | 5–10 | Corbett Sports Center (1,015); Greensboro, NC |
| 01/05/2016*; 7:00 pm, ESPN3 | | at USC Upstate | L 68–78 | 5–11 | Hodge Center (423); Spartanburg, SC |
| 01/09/2016; 4:00 pm | | at Savannah State | L 68–75 | 5–12 (2–1) | Tiger Arena (1,240); Savannah, GA |
| 01/11/2016; 7:30 pm | | at South Carolina State | L 85–92 | 5–13 (2–2) | SHM Memorial Center (578); Orangeburg, SC |
| 01/16/2016; 4:00 pm | | Hampton | L 62–79 | 5–14 (2–3) | Corbett Sports Center (1,543); Greensboro, NC |
| 01/18/2016; 7:30 pm | | Norfolk State | L 68–75 | 5–15 (2–4) | Corbett Sports Center (1,206); Greensboro, NC |
| 01/25/2016; 7:30 pm | | at Delaware State | L 55–57 | 5–16 (2–5) | Memorial Hall (1,084); Dover, DE |
| 01/27/2016; 7:30 pm | | at Coppin State; Postponed from 1/23/16 | L 68–73 | 5–17 (2–6) | Physical Education Complex (443); Baltimore, MD |
| 01/30/2016; 4:00 pm | | Savannah State | W 63–62 | 6–17 (3–6) | Corbett Sports Center (1,461); Greensboro, NC |
| 02/03/2016*; 7:00 pm | | Charlotte | L 72–92 | 6–18 | Corbett Sports Center (1,081); Greensboro, NC |
| 02/06/2016; 4:00 pm | | at North Carolina Central | W 67–63 ^{OT} | 7–18 (4–6) | McLendon–McDougald Gymnasium (3,116); Durham, NC |
| 02/13/2016; 4:00 pm | | Florida A&M | W 75–68 | 8–18 (5–6) | Corbett Sports Center (1,063); Greensboro, NC |
| 02/15/2016; 7:30 pm | | Bethune-Cookman | L 77–83 ^{OT} | 8–19 (5–7) | Corbett Sports Center (823); Greensboro, NC |
| 02/22/2016; 7:30 pm | | at Morgan State | L 51–72 | 8–20 (5–8) | Talmadge L. Hill Field House (1,009); Baltimore, MD |
| 02/27/2016; 6:00 pm | | at Florida A&M | W 77–70 ^{OT} | 9–20 (6–8) | Teaching Gym; Tallahassee, FL |
| 02/29/2016; 7:30 pm | | at Bethune-Cookman | L 52–65 | 9–21 (6–9) | Moore Gymnasium; Daytona Beach, FL |
| 03/03/2016; 7:30 pm | | North Carolina Central | L 87–93 | 10–21 (7–9) | Corbett Sports Center (5,700); Greensboro, NC |
MEAC tournament
| 03/07/2016; 7:00 pm, ESPN3 | (6) | vs. (11) Coppin State; First Round | L 91–98 ^{2OT} | 10–22 | Norfolk Scope; Norfolk, VA |
*Non-conference game. ^{#}Rankings from AP Poll. (#) Tournament seedings in parentheses. All times are in Eastern Time.
