= 2015–16 Utah Utes men's basketball team =

American college basketball season

2015–16 Utah Utes men's basketball

NCAA tournament, Second Round
- Conference: Pac-12 Conference

Ranking
- Coaches: No. 20
- AP: No. 13
- Record: 27–9 (13–5 Pac–12)
- Head coach: Larry Krystkowiak (5th season)
- Assistant coaches: Tommy Connor; DeMarlo Slocum; Andy Hill
- Home arena: Jon M. Huntsman Center

2015–16 Pac-12 Conference men's basketball standings
	Conf.				Overall
Team	W		L	PCT	W		L	PCT
No. 5 Oregon †	14	–	4	.778	31	–	7	.816
No. 13 Utah	13	–	5	.722	27	–	9	.750
No. 17 Arizona	12	–	6	.667	25	–	9	.735
No. 23 California	12	–	6	.667	23	–	11	.676
Colorado	10	–	8	.556	22	–	12	.647
USC	9	–	9	.500	21	–	13	.618
Oregon State	9	–	9	.500	19	–	13	.594
Washington	9	–	9	.500	19	–	15	.559
Stanford	8	–	10	.444	15	–	15	.500
UCLA	6	–	12	.333	15	–	17	.469
Arizona State	5	–	13	.278	15	–	17	.469
Washington State	1	–	17	.056	9	–	22	.290
† Pac-12 Tournament winner Rankings from AP poll

The 2015–16 Utah Runnin' Utes men's basketball team represented the University of Utah during the 2015–16 NCAA Division I men's basketball season. They played their home games at the Jon M. Huntsman Center in Salt Lake City as members of the Pac-12 Conference. The Utes were led by fifth year head coach Larry Krystkowiak. They the season 27–9, 13-5 in Pac-12 play to finish in second place. They defeated USC and California to advance to the championship game of the Pac-12 tournament where they lost to Oregon. They received an at-large bid to the NCAA tournament where they defeated Fresno State in the first round to advance to the second round where they lost to Gonzaga.

== Previous season ==
The 2014–15 Utah Utes finished the season 26–9, 13–5 in the Pac-12, to finish in a tie for second place. In the Pac-12 tournament, the Utes made it to the semifinals where they lost to Oregon. They received an at-large bid to the NCAA tournament as a 5-seed where they defeated Stephen F. Austin in the second round, and Georgetown in the third round to advance to the Sweet Sixteen where they lost to Duke.

== Off-season ==
=== Departures ===
Name	Number	Pos.	Height	Weight	Year	Hometown	Notes
Dallin Bachynski	31	C	7'0"	265	Senior	Calgary, Alberta	Graduated
Delon Wright	55	G	6'5"	190	Senior	Los Angeles, California	Graduated/2015 NBA draft
Jeremy Olsen	41	C	6'10"	240	RS Junior	Lawrenceville, Georgia	Retired from basketball for medical reasons

=== Incoming transfers ===
Name	Number	Pos.	Height	Weight	Year	Hometown	Notes
Lorenzo Bonam	15	G	6'4"	215	Junior	Inkster, Michigan	Junior college transfer from Gillette College.
Gabe Bealer	30	G/F	6'5"	180	Junior	Lancaster, California	Junior college transfer from City College of San Francisco.

=== 2015 recruiting class ===
College recruiting information
Name	Hometown	School	Height	Weight	Commit date
Makol Mawien; C/F	West Valley City, Utah	Granger HS	6 ft 9 in (2.06 m)	215 lb (98 kg)	Aug 7, 2014
Makol Mawien; C/F	Recruit ratings: Scout: Rivals: 247Sports: ESPN:				
Overall recruit ranking:
Note: In many cases, Scout, Rivals, 247Sports, On3, and ESPN may conflict in their listings of height and weight.; In these cases, the average was taken. ESPN grades are on a 100-point scale.; Sources: "2015 Utah Basketball Commitment List". Rivals.; "Utah Utes 2015 Player Commits". ESPN.; "2015 Team Ranking". Rivals.

== Roster ==
2015–16 Utah Utes men's basketball team
Players
Coaches

Pos.	#	Name	Height	Weight	Year	Previous school	Hometown
F	0	Brekkott Chapman	6 ft 8 in (2.03 m)	205 lb (93 kg)	So	Roy HS	Roy, Utah
G	1	Isaiah Wright	6 ft 2 in (1.88 m)	180 lb (82 kg)	So	Borah HS	Boise, Idaho
G	5	Austin Eastman (W)	6 ft 3 in (1.91 m)	180 lb (82 kg)	Sr	Billings HS	Billings, Montana
G	10	Jake Connor (W)	6 ft 3 in (1.91 m)	183 lb (83 kg)	RS Fr	Highland HS	Salt Lake City, Utah
G	11	Brandon Taylor	5 ft 10 in (1.78 m)	170 lb (77 kg)	Sr	Pacific Hills School	Los Angeles, California
G/F	14	Dakarai Tucker	6 ft 5 in (1.96 m)	194 lb (88 kg)	Sr	Junípero Serra HS	Los Angeles, California
G	15	Lorenzo Bonam	6 ft 4 in (1.93 m)	189 lb (86 kg)	Jr	Robichaud HS/Gillette College	Inkster, Michigan
F	20	Chris Reyes	6 ft 7 in (2.01 m)	236 lb (107 kg)	Jr	Damien HS/Citrus College	La Verne, California
F	21	Jordan Loveridge	6 ft 6 in (1.98 m)	220 lb (100 kg)	Sr	West Jordan HS	West Jordan, Utah
G	25	Kenneth Ogbe	6 ft 6 in (1.98 m)	194 lb (88 kg)	Jr	Urspring Academy	Ehingen, Germany
G/F	30	Gabe Bealer	6 ft 6 in (1.98 m)	183 lb (83 kg)	Jr	Antelope HS/CCSF	San Francisco, California
F/C	34	Jayce Johnson (redshirt)	7 ft 0 in (2.13 m)	235 lb (107 kg)	Fr	Santa Monica HS	Mission Viejo, California
F	35	Kyle Kuzma	6 ft 9 in (2.06 m)	221 lb (100 kg)	So	Rise Academy	Burton, Michigan
F/C	40	Makol Mawien	6 ft 9 in (2.06 m)	210 lb (95 kg)	Fr	Granger HS	West Valley City, Utah
F	41	Austin Montgomery (W)	6 ft 9 in (2.06 m)	208 lb (94 kg)	Fr	Lakeview Academy	Gainesville, Georgia
C	42	Jakob Poeltl	7 ft 0 in (2.13 m)	248 lb (112 kg)	So	Arkadia Traiskirchen	Vienna, Austria

Head coach

- Larry Krystkowiak (Montana)

Assistant coach(es)

- Tommy Connor (Utah)
- DeMarlo Slocum (Georgia Southern)
- Andy Hill (Eastern Washington)

Legend

- (C) Team captain
- (S) Suspended
- (I) Ineligible
- (W) Walk-on
- Injured
- Current redshirt

Roster
Last update: February 11, 2016

== Schedule ==
Date time, TV	Rank^{#}	Opponent^{#}	Result	Record	High points	High rebounds	High assists	Site (attendance) city, state
Exhibition
Nov. 5*; 6:00 PM, P12N	No. 16	Cal State Monterey Bay	W 124–70	–	20 – Taylor	10 – Tied	6 – Wright	Jon M. Huntsman Center; Salt Lake City, Utah
Non-conference regular season
Nov. 13*; 7:30 PM, P12N	No. 16	Southern Utah; Old Oquirrh Bucket	W 82–71	1–0	26 – Poeltl	12 – Kuzma	5 – Tied	Jon M. Huntsman Center (12,050); Salt Lake City, Utah
Nov. 16*; 7:30 PM, ESPN2	No. 16	San Diego State; College Hoops Tip-Off Marathon	W 81–76	2–0	21 – Loveridge	12 – Poeltl	3 – Bonam	Jon M. Huntsman Center (13,587); Salt Lake City, Utah
Nov. 19*; 5:00 PM, ESPN2	No. 16	vs. Texas Tech; Puerto Rico Tip-Off quarterfinals	W 73–63	3–0	20 – Bonam	9 – Poeltl	4 – Tied	Roberto Clemente Coliseum (1,947); San Juan, PR
Nov. 20*; 5:00 PM, ESPNU	No. 16	vs. Miami (FL); Puerto Rico Tip-Off semifinals	L 66–90	3–1	18 – Loveridge	6 – Poeltl	4 – Chapman	Roberto Clemente Coliseum (2,001); San Juan, PR
Nov. 22*; 2:30 PM, ESPNU	No. 16	vs. Temple; Puerto Rico Tip-Off 3rd place game	W 74–68	4–1	32 – Poeltl	11 – Poeltl	3 – Tied	Roberto Clemente Coliseum (5,309); San Juan, PR
Nov. 27*; 7:00 PM, P12N		Idaho State	W 102–72	5–1	19 – Poeltl	12 – Kuzma	4 – Loveridge	Jon M. Huntsman Center (13,185); Salt Lake City, Utah
Dec. 2*; 8:00 PM, P12N		BYU; Old Oquirrh Bucket/Deseret First Duel	W 83–75	6–1	26 – Poeltl	13 – Poeltl	9 – Taylor	Jon M. Huntsman Center (15,131); Salt Lake City, Utah
Dec. 5*; 12:00 PM, P12N		IPFW	W 96–79	7–1	21 – Poeltl	8 – Kuzma	6 – Poeltl	Jon M. Huntsman Center (12,241); Salt Lake City, Utah
Dec. 12*; 1:30 PM, ESPN2	No. 25	at Wichita State	L 50–67	7–2	11 – Poeltl	9 – Poeltl	3 – Taylor	Intrust Bank Arena (15,004); Wichita, Kansas
Dec. 16*; 6:00 PM, P12N		Savannah State	W 99–53	8–2	18 – Kuzma	7 – Tied	7 – Bonam	Jon M. Huntsman Center (11,911); Salt Lake City, Utah
Dec. 19*; 10:00 AM, ESPN		vs. No. 7 Duke; Madison Square Garden Showcase	W 77–75 ^{OT}	9–2	21 – Kuzma	14 – Poeltl	9 – Bonam	Madison Square Garden (13,174); New York City, New York
Dec. 22*; 7:00 PM, P12N	No. 24	Delaware State	W 105–58	10–2	15 – Kuzma	7 – Tied	6 – Tied	Jon M. Huntsman Center (12,041); Salt Lake City, Utah
Dec. 28*; 7:00 PM, P12N	No. 21	College of Idaho	W 115–74	11–2	17 – Tied	9 – Poeltl	5 – Wright	Jon M. Huntsman Center (12,329); Salt Lake City, Utah
Pac-12 regular season
Jan. 1; 7:00 PM, ESPNU	No. 21	at Stanford	L 68–70 ^{OT}	11–3 (0–1)	16 – Poeltl	12 – Kuzma	5 – Bonam	Maples Pavilion (4,065); Stanford, California
Jan. 3; 5:30 PM, P12N	No. 21	at California	L 58–71	11–4 (0–2)	19 – Poeltl	10 – Poeltl	5 – Taylor	Haas Pavilion (10,188); Berkeley, California
Jan. 8; 7:00 PM, FS1		at Colorado	W 56–54	12–4 (1–2)	17 – Bonam	11 – Poeltl	3 – Bonam	Coors Events Center (8,701); Boulder, Colorado
Jan. 14; 8:00 PM, P12N		Oregon	L 59–77	12–5 (1–3)	12 – Taylor	7 – Poeltl	4 – Wright	Jon M. Huntsman Center (12,733); Salt Lake City, Utah
Jan. 17; 6:30 PM, ESPNU		Oregon State	W 59–53	13–5 (2–3)	15 – Poeltl	9 – Kuzma	4 – Taylor	Jon M. Huntsman Center (12,417); Salt Lake City, Utah
Jan. 21; 9:00 PM, FS1		at Washington State	W 92–71	14–5 (3–3)	22 – Loveridge	6 – Reyes	5 – Poeltl	Beasley Coliseum (2,717); Pullman, Washington
Jan. 24; 7:30 PM, ESPNU		at Washington	W 80–75 ^{OT}	15–5 (4–3)	29 – Poeltl	10 – Tied	4 – Poeltl	Alaska Airlines Arena (8,073); Seattle, Washington
Jan. 27; 9:00 PM, ESPNU		California	W 73–64	16–5 (5–3)	21 – Poeltl	9 – Poeltl	6 – Tied	Jon M. Huntsman Center (13,055); Salt Lake City, Utah
Jan. 30; 3:00 PM, P12N		Stanford	W 96–74	17–5 (6–3)	23 – Poeltl	7 – Tied	5 – Bonam	Jon M. Huntsman Center (14,109); Salt Lake City, Utah
Feb. 4; 9:00 PM, ESPNU		at Oregon State	L 69–71	17–6 (6–4)	20 – Poeltl	9 – Poeltl	4 – Taylor	Gill Coliseum (5,242); Corvallis, Oregon
Feb. 7; 2:00 PM, ESPN2		at No. 16 Oregon	L 66–76	17–7 (6–5)	18 – Kuzma	10 – Loveridge	3 – Tied	Matthew Knight Arena (6,807); Eugene, Oregon
Feb. 10; 7:00 PM, ESPN2		Washington	W 90–82	18–7 (7–5)	23 – Poeltl	6 – Poeltl	7 – Kuzma	Jon M. Huntsman Center (12,616); Salt Lake City, Utah
Feb. 14; 1:00 PM, P12N		Washington State	W 88–47	19–7 (8–5)	25 – Poeltl	10 – Poeltl	5 – Wright	Jon M. Huntsman Center (11,646); Salt Lake City, Utah
Feb. 18; 8:00 PM, ESPN2		at UCLA	W 75–73	20–7 (9–5)	17 – Loveridge	11 – Poeltl	7 – Taylor	Pauley Pavilion (7,249); Los Angeles, California
Feb. 21; 4:00 PM, P12N		at USC	W 80–69	21–7 (10–5)	29 – Poeltl	13 – Poeltl	10 – Taylor	Galen Center (7,931); Los Angeles, California
Feb. 25; 7:00 PM, P12N	No. 22	Arizona State	W 81–46	22–7 (11–5)	15 – Chapman	9 – Chapman	4 – Taylor	Jon M. Huntsman Center (12,523); Salt Lake City, Utah
Feb. 27; 12:00 PM, ESPN	No. 22	No. 9 Arizona	W 70–64	23–7 (12–5)	19 – Taylor	10 – Poeltl	3 – Chapman	Jon M. Huntsman Center (15,508); Salt Lake City, Utah
Mar. 5; 7:30 PM, ESPNU	No. 13	Colorado	W 57–55	24–7 (13–5)	16 – Poeltl	8 – Poeltl	4 – Taylor	Jon M. Huntsman Center (15,000); Salt Lake City, Utah
Pac-12 Tournament
Mar. 10; 7:00 PM, P12N	(2) No. 12	vs. (7) USC; Quarterfinals	W 80–72	25–7	23 – Kuzma	8 – Poeltl	6 – Loveridge	MGM Grand Garden Arena (12,916); Paradise, Nevada
Mar. 11; 9:30 PM, FS1	(2) No. 12	vs. (3) No. 24 California; Semifinals	W 82–78 ^{OT}	26–7	29 – Poeltl	11 – Proeltl	3 – Bonam	MGM Grand Garden Arena (12,916); Paradise, Nevada
Mar. 12; 7:00 PM, FS1	(2) No. 12	vs. (1) No. 8 Oregon; Championship	L 57–88	26–8	13 – Peltl	5 – Kuzma	3 – Loveridge	MGM Grand Garden Arena (12,916); Paradise, Nevada
NCAA tournament
Mar. 17*; 5:27 PM, truTV	(3 MW) No. 13	vs. (14 MW) Fresno State; First Round	W 80–69	27–8	17 – Bonam	18 – Poeltl	6 – Taylor	Pepsi Center (19,500); Denver, Colorado
Mar. 19*; 6:40 PM, TNT	(3 MW) No. 13	vs. (11 MW) Gonzaga; Second Round	L 59–82	27–9	15 – Kuzma	4 – Tied	4 – Taylor	Pepsi Center (19,551); Denver, Colorado
*Non-conference game. ^{#}Rankings from AP Poll. (#) Tournament seedings in parentheses. MW=Midwest Region. All times are in Mountain Time.

== Rankings ==
Ranking movement Legend: ██ Increase in ranking. ██ Decrease in ranking. RV=Received votes. NV= Received no votes.
Poll	Pre	Wk 2	Wk 3	Wk 4	Wk 5	Wk 6	Wk 7	Wk 8	Wk 9	Wk 10	Wk 11	Wk 12	Wk 13	Wk 14	Wk 15	Wk 16	Wk 17	Wk 18	Post	Final
AP	16	16	RV	RV	25	RV	24	21	RV	RV	RV	RV	RV	RV	RV	22	13	12	13	N/A
Coaches	16	16	RV	RV	24	RV	RV	22	RV	RV	NV	RV	RV	RV	RV	23	13	12	14	20
