= 2015–16 Howard Bison men's basketball team =

American college basketball season

2015–16 Howard Bison men's basketball

Men Who Speak Up Main Event Middleweight champions
- Conference: Mid-Eastern Athletic Conference
- Record: 12–20 (6–10 MEAC)
- Head coach: Kevin Nickelberry (6th season)
- Assistant coaches: Keith Coutreyer; Travis Lyons; Clarence Carter
- Home arena: Burr Gymnasium

2015–16 MEAC men's basketball standings
	Conf.				Overall
Team	W		L	PCT	W		L	PCT
Hampton †	13	–	3	.813	21	–	11	.656
South Carolina State	12	–	4	.750	19	–	15	.559
Norfolk State	12	–	4	.750	17	–	17	.500
Bethune–Cookman	10	–	6	.625	14	–	18	.438
Savannah State	9	–	7	.563	16	–	16	.500
North Carolina Central	7	–	9	.438	13	–	19	.406
North Carolina A&T	7	–	9	.438	10	–	22	.313
Md. Eastern Shore	7	–	9	.438	10	–	22	.313
Howard	6	–	10	.375	12	–	20	.375
Morgan State	6	–	10	.375	9	–	22	.290
Coppin State	6	–	10	.375	9	–	22	.290
Delaware State	5	–	11	.313	7	–	25	.219
Florida A&M*	4	–	12	.250	8	–	21	.276
† 2016 MEAC tournament winner *ineligible for postseason due to APR violations As of March 18, 2016

The 2015–16 Howard Bison men's basketball team represented Howard University during the 2015–16 NCAA Division I men's basketball season. The Bison, led by sixth-year head coach Kevin Nickelberry, played their home games at the Burr Gymnasium and were members of the Mid-Eastern Athletic Conference. They finished the season 12–20, 6–10 in MEAC play to finish in a three-way tie for ninth place. They lost in the first round of the MEAC tournament to North Carolina Central.

== Roster ==
Number	Name	Position	Height	Weight	Year	Hometown
0	Dalique Mingo	Guard	6–2	200	Sophomore	Long Island, New York
2	Kofi Andoh	Guard	6–4	195	Junior	Largo, Maryland
3	Keon Hill	Guard	5–9	170	Junior	Largo, Maryland
4	Ausar Madison	Guard	5–9	150	Junior	Los Angeles, California
11	James Daniel III	Guard	5–11	165	Junior	Hampton, Virginia
14	Saleem Little	Forward	6–4	185	Freshman	Paulsboro, New Jersey
15	Damon Collins	Guard/forward	6–5	180	Junior	Grand Prairie, Texas
20	Solomon Mangham	Forward/center	6–7	210	Junior	Stone Mountain, Georgia
21	Chuck Smith	Guard	5–9	180	Junior	Denver, Colorado
22	Marcel Boyd	Center	6–10	230	Junior	Accokeek, Maryland
23	Jalen Jones	Forward	6–3	200	Freshman	Kinston, North Carolina
24	Patrick Speller	Guard	5–10	200	Junior	Nashville, Tennessee
25	Cameron Lewis	Center/forward	6–8	220	Freshman	Buffalo, New York
32	Tyler Stone	Forward	6–7	205	Junior	Toronto, Ontario, Canada
33	James Miller	Guard/forward	6–4	185	Junior	Clinton, North Carolina
44	Oliver Ellison	Center	6–9	220	Senior	Washington, D.C.

== Schedule ==
Date time, TV	Rank^{#}	Opponent^{#}	Result	Record	Site (attendance) city, state
Regular season
11/14/2015*; 12:00 pm		at UMass; Men Who Speak Up Main Event	L 79–85	0–1	Mullins Center (3,188); Amherst, MA
11/15/2015*; 1:00 pm		at Rutgers; Men Who Speak Up Main Event	L 70–82	0–2	The RAC (3,537); Piscataway, NJ
11/20/2015*; 6:00 pm		Medgar Evers	W 106–64	1–2	Burr Gymnasium (1,805); Washington, D.C.
11/23/2015*; 6:00 pm		vs. Texas Southern; Men Who Speak Up Main Event; Middleweight Semifinals	W 87–81	2–2	MGM Grand Garden Arena (323); Paradise, NV
11/25/2015*; 3:00 pm		vs. Central Arkansas; Men Who Speak Up Main Event; Middleweight Championship	W 73–54	3–2	MGM Grand Garden Arena (217); Paradise, NV
11/28/2015*; 4:00 pm		William & Mary	W 79–77	4–2	Burr Gymnasium (954); Washington, D.C.
11/30/2015*; 7:00 pm		Central Penn	W 98–79	5–2	Burr Gymnasium (550); Washington, D.C.
12/05/2015; 4:00 pm		at North Carolina A&T	L 63–66	5–3 (0–1)	Corbett Sports Center (1,638); Greensboro, NC
12/07/2015; 7:30 pm		at North Carolina Central	W 71–69	6–3 (1–1)	McLendon–McDougald Gymnasium (1,226); Durham,, NC
12/09/2015*; 7:00 pm, ESPNU		at No. 11 Purdue	L 55–93	6–4	Mackey Arena (11,983); West Lafayette, IN
12/12/2015*; 4:00 pm		Radford	L 91–92 ^{2OT}	6–5	Burr Gymnasium (1,365); Washington, D.C.
12/19/2015*; 4:00 pm		UMBC	W 103–93	7–5	Burr Gymnasium (344); Washington, D.C.
12/22/2015*; 7:00 pm		at Central Michigan	L 52–72	7–6	McGuirk Arena (2,259); Mount Pleasant, MI
12/28/2015*; 4:00 pm		at Columbia	L 59–72	7–7	Levien Gymnasium (1,514); New York City, NY
01/02/2016*; 10:30 pm		at Hawaii	L 59–94	7–8	Stan Sheriff Center (6,043); Honolulu, HI
01/06/2016*; 7:00 pm		Cornell	L 81–84	7–9	Burr Gymnasium (305); Washington, D.C.
01/09/2016; 4:00 pm		Coppin State	W 72–63	8–9 (2–1)	Burr Gymnasium (1,502); Washington, D.C.
01/16/2016*; 12:00 pm		Harvard	L 61–69	8–10	Burr Gymnasium (2,700); Washington, D.C.
01/20/2016; 4:30 pm		at Delaware State; Postponed from 1/11/16	W 71–67	9–10 (3–1)	Memorial Hall (1,685); Dover, DE
01/25/2016; 7:30 pm		Bethune-Cookman	W 70–68	10–10 (4–1)	Burr Gymnasium (1,605); Washington, D.C.
01/30/2016; 4:00 pm		at Morgan State	L 63–83	10–11 (4–2)	Talmadge L. Hill Field House (1,508); Baltimore, MD
02/01/2016; 7:30 pm, ESPNU		at Maryland Eastern Shore	L 67–85	10–12 (4–3)	Hytche Athletic Center (3,122); Princess Anne, MD
02/06/2016; 4:00 pm		Norfolk State	L 92–99 ^{2OT}	10–13 (4–4)	Burr Gymnasium (1,550); Washington, D.C.
02/08/2016; 8:00 pm		Hampton	L 65–68	10–14 (4–5)	Burr Gymnasium (2,700); Washington, D.C.
02/13/2016; 4:00 pm		at Coppin State	L 66–90	10–15 (4–6)	Physical Education Complex (1,200); Baltimore, MD
02/16/2016; 7:00 pm		Maryland Eastern Shore; Postponed from 02/15/16	W 77–74	11–15 (5–6)	Burr Gymnasium (3,000); Washington, D.C.
02/20/2016; 4:00 pm		Savannah State	L 56–66	11–16 (5–7)	Burr Gymnasium (1,205); Washington, D.C.
02/22/2016; 8:00 pm		South Carolina State	L 63–71	11–17 (5–8)	Burr Gymnasium (1,250); Washington, D.C.
02/24/2016; 7:30 pm		Florida A&M; Postponed from 1/23/16	W 63–53	12–17 (6–8)	Burr Gymnasium (950); Washington, D.C.
02/27/2016; 6:00 pm		at Hampton	L 67–68	12–18 (6–9)	Hampton Convocation Center (6,943); Hampton, VA
02/29/2016; 7:30 pm		at Norfolk State	L 66–84	12–19 (6–10)	Joseph G. Echols Memorial Hall (2,111); Norfolk, VA
MEAC tournament
03/08/2016; 6:00 pm, ESPN3	(10)	vs. (7) North Carolina Central; First Round	L 66–68	12–20	Norfolk Scope; Norfolk, VA
*Non-conference game. ^{#}Rankings from AP Poll. (#) Tournament seedings in parentheses. All times are in Eastern Time.
