= 2015–16 South Carolina State Bulldogs basketball team =

American college basketball season

2015–16 South Carolina State Bulldogs basketball

CIT, First round
- Conference: Mid-Eastern Athletic Conference
- Record: 19–15 (12–4 MEAC)
- Head coach: Murray Garvin (3rd season)
- Assistant coaches: Kevin Spencer; Rio Pitt
- Home arena: SHM Memorial Center

2015–16 MEAC men's basketball standings
	Conf.				Overall
Team	W		L	PCT	W		L	PCT
Hampton †	13	–	3	.813	21	–	11	.656
South Carolina State	12	–	4	.750	19	–	15	.559
Norfolk State	12	–	4	.750	17	–	17	.500
Bethune–Cookman	10	–	6	.625	14	–	18	.438
Savannah State	9	–	7	.563	16	–	16	.500
North Carolina Central	7	–	9	.438	13	–	19	.406
North Carolina A&T	7	–	9	.438	10	–	22	.313
Md. Eastern Shore	7	–	9	.438	10	–	22	.313
Howard	6	–	10	.375	12	–	20	.375
Morgan State	6	–	10	.375	9	–	22	.290
Coppin State	6	–	10	.375	9	–	22	.290
Delaware State	5	–	11	.313	7	–	25	.219
Florida A&M*	4	–	12	.250	8	–	21	.276
† 2016 MEAC tournament winner *ineligible for postseason due to APR violations As of March 18, 2016

The 2015–16 South Carolina State Bulldogs basketball team represented South Carolina State University during the 2015–16 NCAA Division I men's basketball season. The Bulldogs, led by third year head coach Murray Garvin, played their home games at the SHM Memorial Center and were members of the Mid-Eastern Athletic Conference. They finished the season 19–15, 12–4 in MEAC play to finish in a tie for second place. They defeated Coppin State and Norfolk State to advance to the championship game of the MEAC tournament where they lost to Hampton. They were invited to the CollegeInsider.com Tournament where they lost in the first round to Grand Canyon.

== Roster ==
Number	Name	Position	Height	Weight	Year	Hometown
0	Gabriel McCray	Guard/Forward	6'7"	215	Senior	Mitchellville, Maryland
1	Ed Stephens	Guard	6'2"	175	Sophomore	Columbia, South Carolina
2	Tashombe Riley	Forward	6'7"	200	Sophomore	Orangeburg, South Carolina
3	Greg Mortimer	Guard	6'3"	191	Junior	Savannah, Georgia
5	Doudou Gueye	Center	6'10"	250	Junior	Dakar, Senegal
11	Jalen White	Guard	6'1"	185	Junior	Charlotte, North Carolina
20	Bobby Williams	Guard	6'1"	160	Junior	Kingstree, South Carolina
22	Eric Eaves	Guard	6'3"	185	Junior	Columbia, South Carolina
23	Ty Soloman	Guard	5'10"	170	Sophomore	James Island, South Carolina
24	Najee Pritchett	Guard	6'4"	210	Junior	Charlotte, North Carolina
30	Darryl Palmer	Center	6'8"	225	Senior	Summerville, South Carolina
33	Luka Radovic	Forward	6'9"	245	Senior	Podgorica, Montenegro
34	Jaylen Reid	Forward	6'7"	200	Junior	Rock Hill, South Carolina

== Schedule ==
Date time, TV	Rank^{#}	Opponent^{#}	Result	Record	Site (attendance) city, state
Regular season
11/13/2015*; 7:00 pm		at College of Charleston	L 54–74	0–1	TD Arena (4,024); Charleston, SC
11/16/2015*; 7:00 pm		Voorhees	W 113–69	1–1	SHM Memorial Center; Orangeburg, SC
11/20/2015*; 8:30 pm		vs. Longwood @EKUHoops Classic	W 83–77	2–1	McBrayer Arena (500); Richmond, KY
11/21/2015*; 2:00 pm		at Eastern Kentucky @EKUHoops Classic	L 82–92	2–2	McBrayer Arena (1,700); Richmond, KY
11/22/2015*; 4:30 pm		vs. Ball State @EKUHoops Classic	L 60–72	2–3	McBrayer Arena (500); Richmond, KY
11/25/2015*; 6:00 pm		Allen	W 86–74	3–3	SHM Memorial Center (208); Orangeburg, SC
11/29/2015*; 3:00 pm, FSKC		at Kansas State	L 66–68	3–4	Bramlage Coliseum (11,781); Manhattan, KS
12/05/2015; 6:00 pm		at Florida A&M	W 79–67	4–4 (1–0)	Teaching Gym (890); Tallahassee, FL
12/07/2015; 7:30 pm		at Behune-Cookman	L 54–69	4–5 (1–1)	Moore Gymnasium (993); Daytona Beach, FL
12/12/2015*; 6:00 pm		Jacksonville	W 81–74	5–5	SHM Memorial Center (169); Orangeburg, SC
12/16/2015*; 7:00 pm		at Duquesne	L 68–83	5–6	Palumbo Center (1,361); Pittsburgh, PA
12/19/2015*; 2:00 pm		at St. Bonaventure	L 45–64	5–7	Reilly Center (3,347); Olean, NY
12/22/2015*; 7:00 pm, ESPN3		at East Carolina	L 71–98	5–8	Williams Arena (4,145); Greenville, NC
12/27/2015*; 6:00 pm, BTN		at Ohio State	L 57–73	5–9	Value City Arena (13,506); Columbus, OH
12/30/2015*; 7:00 pm		at Akron	L 68–78	5–10	James A. Rhodes Arena (2,741); Akron, OH
01/02/2016*; 3:30 pm, ESPN3		at Miami (OH)	W 71–67	6–10	Millett Hall (1,392); Oxford, OH
01/09/2016; 4:00 pm		North Carolina Central	W 91–75	7–10 (2–1)	SHM Memorial Center; Orangeburg, SC
01/11/2016; 7:30 pm		North Carolina A&T	W 92–85	8–10 (3–1)	SHM Memorial Center (578); Orangeburg, SC
01/16/2016; 4:00 pm		Delaware State	W 90–79	9–10 (4–1)	SHM Memorial Center (476); Orangeburg, SC
01/18/2016; 7:30 pm		Maryland Eastern Shore	W 68–63	10–10 (5–1)	SHM Memorial Center (613); Orangeburg, SC
01/23/2016; 6:00 pm		at Norfolk State	L 74–87	10–11 (5–2)	Joseph G. Echols Memorial Hall (1,461); Norfolk, VA
01/25/2016; 7:00 pm		at Hampton	W 67–62	11–11 (6–2)	Hampton Convocation Center (3,756); Hampton, VA
01/30/2016; 4:00 pm		at Delaware State	W 56–41	12–11 (7–2)	Memorial Hall (968); Dover, DE
02/06/2016; 4:00 pm		Coppin State	W 88–84	13–11 (8–2)	SHM Memorial Center (403); Orangeburg, SC
02/08/2016; 7:30 pm		Morgan State	W 82–78	14–11 (9–2)	SHM Memorial Center (416); Orangeburg, SC
02/13/2016; 4:10 pm		Savannah State	L 57–60	14–12 (9–3)	SHM Memorial Center (469); Orangeburg, SC
02/20/2016; 4:00 pm		at Maryland Eastern Shore	W 62–58	15–12 (10–3)	Hytche Athletic Center (5,064); Princess Anne, MD
02/22/2016; 7:30 pm		at Howard	W 71–63	16–12 (11–3)	Burr Gymnasium (1,250); Washington, D.C.
02/27/2016; 6:00 pm		at Savannah State	L 64–76	16–13 (11–4)	Tiger Arena (1,801); Savannah, GA
03/03/2016; 7:30 pm		Bethune-Cookman	W 85–72	17–13 (12–4)	SHM Memorial Center (532); Orangeburg, SC
MEAC tournament
03/10/2016; 8:00 pm, ESPN3	(3)	vs. (11) Coppin State; Quarterfinals	W 90–80	18–13	Norfolk Scope; Norfolk, VA
03/11/2016; 8:00 pm, ESPN3	(3)	vs. (2) Norfolk State; Semifinals	W 67–65	19–13	Norfolk Scope; Norfolk, VA
03/12/2016; 1:00 pm, ESPN2	(3)	vs. (1) Hampton; Championship game	L 69–81	19–14	Norfolk Scope; Norfolk, VA
CIT
3/14/2016*; 10:00 pm, CBSSN		at Grand Canyon; First round Coach John McLendon Classic	L 74–78	19–15	GCU Arena (7,315); Phoenix, AZ
*Non-conference game. ^{#}Rankings from AP Poll. (#) Tournament seedings in parentheses. All times are in Eastern Time.
