= 2015–16 Hampton Pirates basketball team =

American college basketball season

2015–16 Hampton Pirates men's basketball
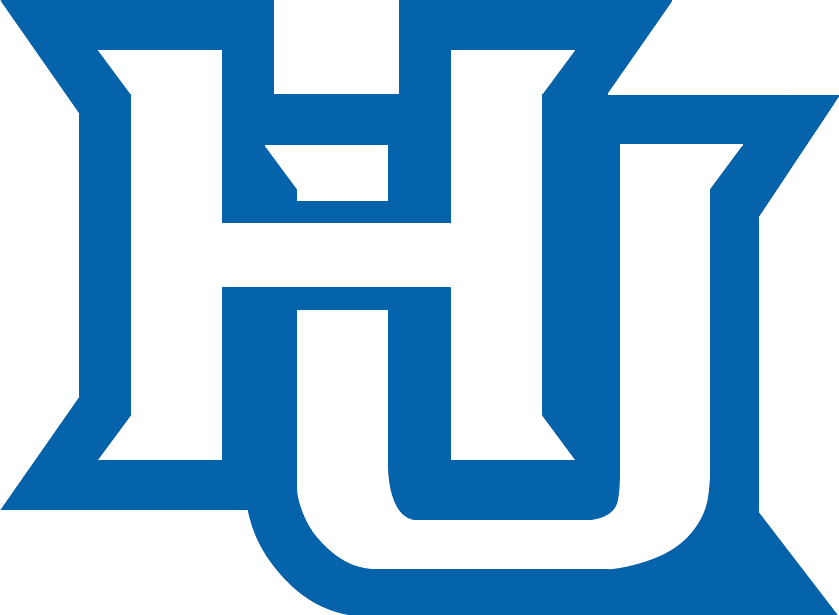

MEAC regular season and tournament champions

NCAA tournament, First Round
- Conference: Mid-Eastern Athletic Conference
- Record: 21–11 (13–3 MEAC)
- Head coach: Edward Joyner (7th season)
- Assistant coaches: Darryl Sharp; Akeem Miskdeen; DeMarco Johnson
- Home arena: Hampton Convocation Center

2015–16 MEAC men's basketball standings
	Conf.				Overall
Team	W		L	PCT	W		L	PCT
Hampton †	13	–	3	.813	21	–	11	.656
South Carolina State	12	–	4	.750	19	–	15	.559
Norfolk State	12	–	4	.750	17	–	17	.500
Bethune–Cookman	10	–	6	.625	14	–	18	.438
Savannah State	9	–	7	.563	16	–	16	.500
North Carolina Central	7	–	9	.438	13	–	19	.406
North Carolina A&T	7	–	9	.438	10	–	22	.313
Md. Eastern Shore	7	–	9	.438	10	–	22	.313
Howard	6	–	10	.375	12	–	20	.375
Morgan State	6	–	10	.375	9	–	22	.290
Coppin State	6	–	10	.375	9	–	22	.290
Delaware State	5	–	11	.313	7	–	25	.219
Florida A&M*	4	–	12	.250	8	–	21	.276
† 2016 MEAC tournament winner *ineligible for postseason due to APR violations As of March 18, 2016

The 2015–16 Hampton Pirates men's basketball team represented Hampton University during the 2015–16 NCAA Division I men's basketball season. The Pirates, led by seventh year head coach Edward Joyner, played their home games at the Hampton Convocation Center and were members of the Mid-Eastern Athletic Conference. They finished the season 21–11, 13–3 in MEAC play to win the MEAC regular season championship. They defeated Morgan State, Savannah State, and South Carolina State to be champions of the MEAC tournament. They earned the conference's automatic bid to the NCAA tournament where they lost in the first round to Virginia.

== Roster ==
Number	Name	Position	Height	Weight	Year	Hometown
0	Donald Ralls, Jr.	Guard	6–0	185	Sophomore	Philadelphia, Pennsylvania
2	Jared Brown,	Guard	5-11	165	Freshman	Baltimore, Maryland
1	Keith Carroll	Guard	5–11	160	Sophomore	Santa Clarita, California
3	Quinton Chievous	Guard	6–6	215	Senior	Chicago, Illinois
4	Lawrence Cooks	Guard	6–1	175	RS–Junior	Charlotte, North Carolina
11	Devon Oakley	Guard	6–3	185	RS–Freshman	Chesapeake, Virginia
12	Imani Miller	Guard	6–1	185	Freshman	Knoxville, Tennessee
13	Gregory Hayden	Guard	5–7	160	Junior	Dallas, Texas
14	Brian Darden	Guard	6–2	183	Junior	Hampton, Virginia
15	Branden Aughburns	Forward	6–9	230	Freshman	Queens, New York
20	David Runcie	Guard	6–3	170	RS–Freshman	Maplewood, New Jersey
22	Trevond Barnes	Forward	6–9	210	Freshman	LaFayette, Alabama
25	Akim Mitchell	Guard	6–5	200	Freshman	Charlotte, North Carolina
30	Jervon Pressley	Forward	6–8	250	Senior	Charlotte, North Carolina
31	Charles Wilson-Fisher	Forward	6–9	205	RS–Sophomore	Alpharetta, Georgia
32	Dionte Adams	Forward	6–7	215	Senior	Charlotte, North Carolina
33	Tre Houston	Guard	6–0	155	RS–Freshman	Atlanta, Georgia
34	Reginald Johnson	Guard	6–2	190	Senior	Chicago, Illinois
35	Rasheed Stanley	Center	7–0	290	RS–Freshman	Duluth, Georgia
35	Eugene Marshall III	Guard	6–3	170	RS–Freshman	Hackensack, New Jersey
50	Kalin Fisher	Guard	6–2	180	Freshman	Chicago, Illinois

== Schedule ==
Date time, TV	Rank^{#}	Opponent^{#}	Result	Record	Site (attendance) city, state
Regular season
11/14/2015*; 4:00 pm, ESPN3		at Winthrop	L 95–102	0–1	Winthrop Coliseum (2,340); Rock Hill, SC
11/17/2015*; 7:30 pm		at American	W 61–48	1–1	Bender Arena (1,224); Washington, D.C.
11/20/2015*; 7:00 pm		Appalachian State	W 82–61	2–1	Hampton Convocation Center (5,124); Hampton, VA
11/25/2015*; 7:00 pm		at William & Mary	L 67–86	2–2	Kaplan Arena (2,330); Williamsburg, VA
11/30/2015*; 9:00 pm		at Grand Canyon	L 51–63	2–3	GCU Arena (4,723); Phoenix, AZ
12/02/2015*; 9:00 pm		at Northern Arizona	W 98–94 ^{2OT}	3–3	Walkup Skydome (986); Flagstaff, AZ
12/05/2015; 4:00 pm		at Coppin State	W 74–71	4–3 (1–0)	Physical Education Complex (768); Baltimore, MD
12/17/2015*; 7:00 pm, TWCS		at No. 18 SMU; Las Vegas Classic	L 72–105	4–4	Moody Coliseum (6,329); University Park, TX
12/19/2015*; 9:00 pm, P12N		at Colorado; Las Vegas Classic	L 53–95	4–5	Coors Events Center (8,177); Boulder, CO
12/22/2015*; 3:00 pm		vs. Nicholls State; Las Vegas Classic	L 81–84	4–6	Orleans Arena; Paradise, NV
12/23/2015*		vs. Louisiana–Monroe; Las Vegas Classic	W 75–64	5–6	Orleans Arena; Paradise, NV
12/31/2015*; 3:00 pm		vs. Texas Southern			Birmingham, AL
01/03/2016*; 3:00 pm		Princeton	L 59–89	5–7	Hampton Convocation Center (2,115); Hampton, VA
01/06/2016; 7:00 pm		at Morgan State	W 83–80 ^{OT}	6–7 (2–0)	Talmadge L. Hill Field House (306); Baltimore, MD
01/09/2016; 6:00 pm		Bethune-Cookman	W 75–70	7–7 (3–0)	Hampton Convocation Center (3,543); Hampton, VA
01/11/2016; 7:00 pm		Florida A&M	W 71–65 ^{OT}	8–7 (4–0)	Hampton Convocation Center (3,456); Hampton, VA
01/16/2016; 4:00 pm		at North Carolina A&T	W 79–62	9–7 (5–0)	Corbett Sports Center (1,543); Greensboro, NC
01/18/2016; 7:30 pm, ESPNU		at North Carolina Central	W 80–79	10–7 (6–0)	McLendon–McDougald Gymnasium (3,065); Durham,, NC
01/23/2016; 6:00 pm		Savannah State	W 75–52	11–7 (7–0)	Hampton Convocation Center (3,521); Hampton, VA
01/25/2016; 7:00 pm		South Carolina State	L 62–67	11–8 (7–1)	Hampton Convocation Center (3,756); Hampton, VA
01/30/2016; 6:00 pm		Norfolk State	W 86–76	12–8 (8–1)	Hampton Convocation Center (8,123); Hampton, VA
02/02/2016*; 6:00 pm		Washington Adventist	W 69–67	13–8	Hampton Convocation Center (2,124); Hampton, VA
02/06/2016; 4:00 pm		at Maryland Eastern Shore	L 70–73	13–9 (8–2)	Hytche Athletic Center (2,173); Princess Anne, MD
02/08/2016; 7:30 pm		at Howard	W 68–65	14–9 (9–2)	Burr Gymnasium (2,700); Washington, D.C.
02/15/2016; 7:00 pm		Morgan State	W 87–79	15–9 (10–2)	Hampton Convocation Center (5,123); Hampton, VA
02/22/2016; 7:30 pm		at Delaware State	W 82–72	16–9 (11–2)	Memorial Hall (1,254); Dover, DE
02/27/2016; 6:00 pm		Howard	W 68–67	17–9 (12–2)	Hampton Convocation Center (6,943); Hampton, VA
02/29/2016; 7:00 pm		Delaware State	W 79–65	18–9 (13–2)	Hampton Convocation Center (4,123); Hampton, VA
03/03/2016; 8:00 pm		at Norfolk State	L 63–83	18–10 (13–3)	Joseph G. Echols Memorial Hall (4,500); Norfolk, VA
MEAC tournament
03/09/2016; 6:00 pm, ESPN3	(1)	vs. (9) Morgan State; Quarterfinals	W 83–81	19–10	Norfolk Scope; Norfolk, VA
03/11/2016; 6:00 pm, ESPN3	(1)	vs. (5) Savannah State; Semifinals	W 89–55	20–10	Norfolk Scope; Norfolk, VA
03/12/2016; 1:00 pm, ESPN2	(1)	vs. (3) South Carolina State; Championship	W 81–69	21–10	Norfolk Scope; Norfolk, VA
NCAA tournament
3/17/2016; 3:10 pm, truTV	(16 MW)	vs. (1 MW) No. 4 Virginia; First Round	L 45–81	21–11	PNC Arena (19,722); Raleigh, NC
*Non-conference game. ^{#}Rankings from AP Poll. (#) Tournament seedings in parentheses. MW=Midwest Region. All times are in Eastern Time.
