= 2016 CollegeInsider.com Postseason Tournament =

US basketball tournament

- Season: 2015–16
- Teams: 26
- Finals site: Levien Gymnasium, New York City, New York
- Champions: Columbia (1st title)
- Runner-up: UC Irvine (1st title game)
- Semifinalists: NJIT (2nd semifinal); Coastal Carolina (1st semifinal)
- Winning coach: Kyle Smith (1st title)
- MVP: Maodo Lo (Columbia)
- Attendance: 43,125

The 2016 CollegeInsider.com Postseason Tournament (CIT) was a postseason single-elimination tournament of 26 NCAA Division I basketball teams. The first round was played March 14–16, 2016. The second round March 18–20, Quarterfinals March 22–24 the semifinals March 27, and the championship game was played on March 29

Participants who belonged to "mid-major" conferences, not invited to the 2016 NCAA Tournament, National Invitation Tournament, College Basketball Invitational or the Vegas 16 made up the field. An experimental rule allowing players six personal fouls instead of five was used in all 2016 national postseason tournaments except for the NCAA Tournament.

Originally set to include 32 teams, the 2016 tournament consisted of 26 participants. After all 26 teams played in the first round, the top-three highest rated teams based on the Pomeroy College Basketball Ratings regular season rating automatically advanced to the quarterfinals.

Columbia beat UC Irvine 73–67 in the championship game to give the Ivy League just its second postseason tournament title in conference history (Princeton won the 1975 NIT).

== Participating teams ==
The following teams received an invitation to the 2016 CIT:

| Team | Conference | Overall record | Conference record |
|---|---|---|---|
| Army | Patriot | 19–13 | 9–9 |
| Ball State | Mid-American | 19–13 | 10–8 |
| Boston University | Patriot | 18–14 | 11–7 |
| Central Michigan | Mid-American | 17–15 | 10–8 |
| Coastal Carolina | Big South | 18–11 | 12–6 |
| Columbia | Ivy | 21–10 | 10–4 |
| Fordham | Atlantic 10 | 17–13 | 8–10 |
| Fairfield | MAAC | 19–13 | 12–8 |
| Furman | Southern | 18–15 | 11–7 |
| Grand Canyon | WAC | 25–6 | 11–3 |
| Jackson State | SWAC | 19–15 | 12–6 |
| Louisiana–Monroe | Sun Belt | 20–13 | 15–5 |
| Louisiana–Lafayette | Sun Belt | 17–14 | 12–8 |
| Mercer | Southern | 19–14 | 8–10 |
| New Hampshire | America East | 19–12 | 11–5 |
| NJIT | Atlantic Sun | 17–14 | 8–6 |
| Norfolk State | MEAC | 17–16 | 12–4 |
| North Dakota | Big Sky | 17–15 | 10–8 |
| Sam Houston State | Southland | 18–15 | 12–6 |
| Savannah State | MEAC | 16–15 | 9–7 |
| South Carolina State | MEAC | 19–14 | 12–4 |
| Tennessee State | Ohio Valley | 20–10 | 11–5 |
| Texas–Arlington | Sun Belt | 23–10 | 13–7 |
| Texas A&M–Corpus Christi | Southland | 25–7 | 15–3 |
| UC Irvine | Big West | 25–9 | 13–3 |
| UT Martin | Ohio Valley | 19–14 | 10–6 |

== Format ==
The CIT uses the old NIT model in which there is no set bracket. Future round opponents are determined by the results of the previous round. After all 26 teams played in the first round, the top-three highest rated teams based on the Pomeroy College Basketball Ratings regular season rating automatically advanced to the quarterfinals.

=== Coach John McLendon Classic ===
The Coach John McLendon Classic was televised March 14, on CBS Sports Network as part of the CIT. The Classic will feature at least one historically black college/university. The winner of the John McLendon Classic advanced to the second round of the CIT. This will be the first time in NCAA Division I Basketball history, that a "Classic" has been part of a postseason tournament. Previously the John McLendon Classic was played during the regular season.

== Schedule ==
| Date | Time* | Matchup | Television | Score | Attendance |
First round
| March 14 | 7:30 pm | **Jackson State** at Sam Houston State | | 81–77^{OT} | 376 |
| March 14 | 10:00 pm | South Carolina State vs **Grand Canyon** (Coach John McLendon Classic) | CBSSN | 74–78 | 7,315 |
| March 15 | 7:00 pm | Mercer at **Coastal Carolina** | | 57–65 | 940 |
| March 15 | 7:00 pm | Louisiana–Monroe at **Furman** | | 57–58 | 806 |
| March 15 | 7:00 pm | **Ball State** at Tennessee State | | 78–73^{2OT} | 1,013 |
| March 16 | 7:00 pm | **Texas–Arlington** at Savannah State | | 75–59 | 1,192 |
| March 16 | 7:00 pm | **Boston University** at Fordham | | 69–66 | 1,264 |
| March 16 | 7:00 pm | Norfolk State at **Columbia** | | 54–86 | 1,037 |
| March 16 | 7:00 pm | **New Hampshire** at Fairfield | | 77–62 | 2,479 |
| March 16 | 7:00 pm | **UT Martin** at Central Michigan | | 76–73 | 832 |
| March 16 | 7:30 pm | Army at **NJIT** | ESPN3 | 65–79 | 855 |
| March 16 | 8:00 pm | **UC Irvine** at North Dakota | Midco SN | 89–86^{OT} | 1,263 |
| March 16 | 8:00 pm | Texas A&M–Corpus Christi at **Louisiana–Lafayette** | | 72–96 | 1,205 |
Second round
| March 17 | 10:00 pm | Jackson State at **Grand Canyon** | Cox7 | 54–64 | 7,015 |
| March 19 | 2:00 pm | New Hampshire at **Coastal Carolina** | | 62–71 | 847 |
| March 19 | 2:00 pm | **Louisiana–Lafayette** at Furman | | 80–72 | 1,308 |
| March 20 | 6:00 pm | UT Martin at **Ball State** | ESPN3 | 80–83^{OT} | 1,203 |
| March 21 | 7:30 pm | Boston University at **NJIT** | ESPN3 | 72–83 | 1,134 |
Quarterfinals
| March 23 | 7:00 pm | Ball State at **Columbia** | | 67–69 | 1,397 |
| March 23 | 7:00 pm | Grand Canyon at **Coastal Carolina** | | 58–60 | 1,302 |
| March 23 | 8:00 pm | **UC Irvine** at Louisiana–Lafayette | | 67–66 | 1,901 |
| March 24 | 7:30 pm | Texas–Arlington at **NJIT** | ESPN3 | 60–63 | 1,383 |
Semifinals
| March 27 | 6:00 pm | NJIT at **Columbia** | CBSSN | 65–80 | 1,249 |
| March 27 | 9:00 pm | **UC Irvine** at Coastal Carolina | CBSSN | 66–47 | 1,204 |
Championship
| March 29 | 7:00 pm | UC Irvine at **Columbia** | CBSSN | 67–73 | 2,603 |
*All times are listed as Eastern Daylight Time (UTC-4). Winning team in **bold**.

== Bracket ==
Bracket is for visual purposes only. The CIT does not have a set bracket.

First round March 14–16
UC Irvine | 89*
North Dakota | 86
TX A&M–CC | 72
Louisiana–Lafayette | 96
Louisiana–Monroe | 57
Furman | 58
Jackson State | 81*
Sam Houston State | 77
South Carolina State | 74
Grand Canyon | 78
New Hampshire | 77
Fairfield | 62
Mercer | 57
Coastal Carolina | 65
UT Arlington | 75
Savannah State | 59
Boston U | 69
Fordham | 66
Army | 65
NJIT | 79
UT Martin | 76
Central Michigan | 73
Ball State | 78**
Tennessee State | 73
Norfolk State | 54
Columbia | 86

Second round March 17–21
UC Irvine
Bye
Louisiana–Lafayette | 80
Furman | 72
Jackson State | 54
Grand Canyon | 64
New Hampshire | 62
Coastal Carolina | 71
UT Arlington
Bye
Boston U | 72
NJIT | 83
UT Martin | 80
Ball State | 83*
Bye
Columbia

Quarterfinals; March 23–24
UC Irvine | 67
Louisiana–Lafayette | 66
Grand Canyon | 58
Coastal Carolina | 60
UT Arlington | 60
NJIT | 63
Ball State | 67
Columbia | 69

Semifinals; March 27
UC Irvine | 66
Coastal Carolina | 47
NJIT | 65
Columbia | 80

Championship; March 29
UC Irvine | 67
Columbia | 73

Home teams listed second.
* Denotes overtime period.
