= 2015–16 Morgan State Bears basketball team =

American college basketball season

2015–16 Morgan State Bears men's basketball
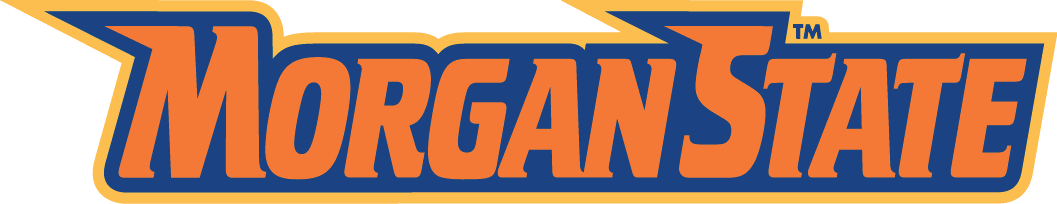
- Conference: Mid-Eastern Athletic Conference
- Record: 9–22 (6–10 MEAC)
- Head coach: Todd Bozeman (10th season)
- Assistant coaches: Brian Ellerby; Larry Stewart; Hans Desir
- Home arena: Talmadge L. Hill Field House

2015–16 MEAC men's basketball standings
	Conf.				Overall
Team	W		L	PCT	W		L	PCT
Hampton †	13	–	3	.813	21	–	11	.656
South Carolina State	12	–	4	.750	19	–	15	.559
Norfolk State	12	–	4	.750	17	–	17	.500
Bethune–Cookman	10	–	6	.625	14	–	18	.438
Savannah State	9	–	7	.563	16	–	16	.500
North Carolina Central	7	–	9	.438	13	–	19	.406
North Carolina A&T	7	–	9	.438	10	–	22	.313
Md. Eastern Shore	7	–	9	.438	10	–	22	.313
Howard	6	–	10	.375	12	–	20	.375
Morgan State	6	–	10	.375	9	–	22	.290
Coppin State	6	–	10	.375	9	–	22	.290
Delaware State	5	–	11	.313	7	–	25	.219
Florida A&M*	4	–	12	.250	8	–	21	.276
† 2016 MEAC tournament winner *ineligible for postseason due to APR violations As of March 18, 2016

The 2015–16 Morgan State Bears men's basketball team represented Morgan State University during the 2015–16 NCAA Division I men's basketball season. The Bears, led by tenth year head coach Todd Bozeman, played their home games at the Talmadge L. Hill Field House and were members of the Mid-Eastern Athletic Conference. They finished the season 9–22, 6–10 in MEAC play to finish in a three-way tie for ninth place. They defeated Maryland Eastern Shore in the first round of the MEAC tournament to advance to the quarterfinals where they lost to Hampton.

== Roster ==
Number	Name	Position	Height	Weight	Year	Hometown
1	Donte Pretlow	Guard	6–0	190	Senior	Baltimore, Maryland
3	Rasean Simpson	Guard	6–6	200	Senior	San Diego, California
4	Cliff Cornish	Forward	6–9	240	RS–Junior	Baltimore, Maryland
5	Andre Horne, Jr.	Guard	6–3	190	Junior	Newark, Delaware
10	Antonio Gillespie	Guard	6–0	170	Freshman	Memphis, Tennessee
11	Clive "C.J." Vaughan, Jr.	Guard	6–2	185	Sophomore	Aurora, Illinois
12	Jamar Redmond	Guard	6–3	200	Sophomore	Roselle, New Jersey
13	Tyler Streeter	Guard	6–4	185	Freshman	Chicago, Illinois
21	Kyle Thomas	Forward	6–7	200	Junior	Owings Mills, Maryland
22	Phillip Carr	Forward	6–8	200	Sophomore	Brooklyn, New York
23	Andrew Hampton	Forward	6–4	200	Senior	Germantown, Maryland
32	Martez Cameron	Guard	5–11	165	Freshman	Chicago, Illinois
33	Jeremiah Curtis	Forward	6–8	230	Sophomore	Stephens City, Virginia
34	Cedric Blossom	Forward	6–6	230	Senior	Columbia, Maryland
42	Anthony Tate	Guard	5–11	165	Freshman	Fort Washington, Maryland
44	Anthony "A.J." Vernon	Forward	6–9	340	Sophomore	Brooklyn, New York

== Schedule ==
Date time, TV	Rank^{#}	Opponent^{#}	Result	Record	Site (attendance) city, state
Regular season
11/13/2015*; 7:00 pm, ESPN3		at No. 6 Virginia	L 48–86	0–1	John Paul Jones Arena (14,034); Charlottesville, VA
11/16/2015*; 7:00 pm		at Towson	L 61–69	0–2	SECU Arena (2,351); Towson, MD
11/18/2015*; 7:00 pm		at Old Dominion	L 48–79	0–3	Ted Constant Convocation Center (6,968); Norfolk, VA
11/21/2015*; 4:00 pm		at Campbell	W 59–54	1–3	Gore Arena (1,637); Buies Creek, NC
11/23/2015*; 7:00 pm		Goldey–Beacom	W 66–62	2–3	Talmadge L. Hill Field House (873); Baltimore, MD
11/28/2015*; 4:00 pm		at High Point	L 72–82	2–4	Millis Center (1,005); High Point, NC
12/02/2015*; 7:00 pm		at Wagner	L 61–62	2–5	Spiro Sports Center (1,143); Staten Island, NY
12/06/2015*; 5:30 pm, ASN		at No. 17 Cincinnati	L 66–87	2–6	Fifth Third Arena (6,126); Cincinnati, OH
12/20/2015*; 1:00 pm		Manhattan	L 66–78	2–7	Talmadge L. Hill Field House (126); Baltimore, MD
12/23/2015*; 7:00 pm		Rider	L 49–71	2–8	Talmadge L. Hill Field House (128); Baltimore, MD
12/28/2015*; 1:00 pm		UC Riverside	L 72–81	2–9	Talmadge L. Hill Field House (79); Baltimore, MD
12/31/2015*; 4:00 pm		at Cal State Bakersfield	L 68–80	2–10	Icardo Center (776); Bakersfield, CA
01/02/2016*; 10:30 pm		at Cal State Northridge	L 74–88	2–11	Matadome (876); Northridge, CA
01/06/2015; 7:00 pm		Hampton	L 80–83 ^{OT}	2–12 (0–1)	Talmadge L. Hill Field House (306); Baltimore, MD
01/09/2015; 4:00 pm		Delaware State	W 63–58	3–12 (1–1)	Talmadge L. Hill Field House (1,109); Baltimore, MD
01/11/2016; 7:30 pm, Harry T Hawk		at Maryland Eastern Shore	L 65–69	3–13 (1–2)	Hytche Athletic Center (671); Princess Anne, MD
01/16/2016; 6:00 pm		at Florida A&M	L 65–72	3–14 (1–3)	Teaching Gym (2,679); Tallahassee, FL
01/18/2016; 7:30 pm		at Bethune-Cookman	L 50–62	3–15 (1–4)	Moore Gymnasium (863); Daytona Beach, FL
01/30/2015; 4:00 pm		Howard	W 83–63	4–15 (2–4)	Talmadge L. Hill Field House (1,508); Baltimore, MD
02/01/2015; 7:30 pm		Coppin State	W 83–43	5–15 (3–4)	Talmadge L. Hill Field House (3,878); Baltimore, MD
02/06/2016; 6:00 pm		at Savannah State	L 49–57	5–16 (3–5)	Tiger Arena (2,671); Savannah, GA
02/08/2016; 7:30 pm		at South Carolina State	L 78–82	5–17 (3–6)	SHM Memorial Center (416); Orangeburg, SC
02/13/2016; 6:00 pm		at Norfolk State	L 73–79	5–18 (3–7)	Joseph G. Echols Memorial Hall (2,561); Norfolk, VA
02/15/2016; 7:00 pm		at Hampton	L 79–87	5–19 (3–8)	Hampton Convocation Center (5,123); Hampton, VA
02/20/2015; 4:00 pm		North Carolina Central	L 59–73	5–20 (3–9)	Talmadge L. Hill Field House (1,104); Baltimore, MD
02/22/2015; 7:30 pm		North Carolina A&T	W 72–51	6–20 (4–9)	Talmadge L. Hill Field House (1,009); Baltimore, MD
02/24/2015; 7:00 pm		Norfolk State	W 89–72	7–20 (5–9)	Talmadge L. Hill Field House (857); Baltimore, MD
02/27/2015; 4:00 pm		at Coppin State	W 74–72 ^{OT}	8–20 (6–9)	Talmadge L. Hill Field House (2,887); Baltimore, MD
03/03/2015; 7:30 pm		Maryland Eastern Shore	L 71–80	8–21 (6–10)	Talmadge L. Hill Field House (1,126); Baltimore, MD
MEAC tournament
03/08/2016; 4:00 pm, ESPN3	(9)	vs. (8) Maryland Eastern Shore; First Round	W 65–58	9–21	Norfolk Scope; Norfolk, VA
03/09/2016; 6:00 pm, ESPN3	(9)	vs. (1) Hampton; Quarterfinals	L 81–83	9–22	Norfolk Scope; Norfolk, VA
*Non-conference game. ^{#}Rankings from AP Poll. (#) Tournament seedings in parentheses. All times are in Eastern Time.
