= 2015–16 Savannah State Tigers basketball team =

American college basketball season

2015–16 Savannah State Tigers basketball
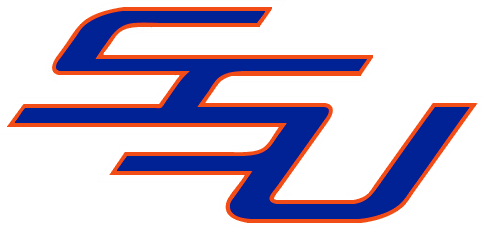

CIT, First round
- Conference: Mid-Eastern Athletic Conference
- Record: 16–16 (9–7 MEAC)
- Head coach: Horace Broadnax (11th season)
- Assistant coaches: Clyde Wormley; Timothy "Pat" Hardy; Joseph Flegler
- Home arena: Tiger Arena

2015–16 MEAC men's basketball standings
	Conf.				Overall
Team	W		L	PCT	W		L	PCT
Hampton †	13	–	3	.813	21	–	11	.656
South Carolina State	12	–	4	.750	19	–	15	.559
Norfolk State	12	–	4	.750	17	–	17	.500
Bethune–Cookman	10	–	6	.625	14	–	18	.438
Savannah State	9	–	7	.563	16	–	16	.500
North Carolina Central	7	–	9	.438	13	–	19	.406
North Carolina A&T	7	–	9	.438	10	–	22	.313
Md. Eastern Shore	7	–	9	.438	10	–	22	.313
Howard	6	–	10	.375	12	–	20	.375
Morgan State	6	–	10	.375	9	–	22	.290
Coppin State	6	–	10	.375	9	–	22	.290
Delaware State	5	–	11	.313	7	–	25	.219
Florida A&M*	4	–	12	.250	8	–	21	.276
† 2016 MEAC tournament winner *ineligible for postseason due to APR violations As of March 18, 2016

The 2015–16 Savannah State Tigers basketball team represented Savannah State University during the 2015–16 NCAA Division I men's basketball season. The Tigers, led by 11th year head coach Horace Broadnax, played their home games at Tiger Arena and were members of the Mid-Eastern Athletic Conference. They finished the season 16–16, 9–7 in MEAC play to finish in fifth place. They defeated Delaware State and Bethune-Cookman to advance to the semifinals of the MEAC tournament where they lost to Hampton. They were invited to the CollegeInsdier.com Tournament where they lost in the first round to Texas–Arlington.

== Roster ==
2015–16 Savannah State Tigers men's basketball team
Players
Coaches

Pos.	#	Name	Height	Weight	Year	Hometown
G/F	00	Novian Cherry	6 ft 5 in (1.96 m)	195 lb (88 kg)	Jr	San Diego, California
G	1	Christopher Martin	6 ft 0 in (1.83 m)	185 lb (84 kg)	Sr	Upper Marlboro, Maryland
G	2	Khalen Pinkett	6 ft 0 in (1.83 m)	180 lb (82 kg)	So	Norcross, Georgia
G	3	Lenjo Kilo	6 ft 8 in (2.03 m)	240 lb (109 kg)	Sr	Silver Springs, Maryland
G/F	4	Troyce Manassa	6 ft 4 in (1.93 m)	215 lb (98 kg)	Jr	Mobile, Alabama
F	5	Jarvaris Jenkins	6 ft 5 in (1.96 m)	200 lb (91 kg)	Jr	Deerfield Beach, Florida
F	10	Brandon Jordan	6 ft 7 in (2.01 m)	200 lb (91 kg)	Jr	Savannah, Georgia
G	11	Treyvon Francis	6 ft 2 in (1.88 m)	175 lb (79 kg)	So	Covington, Georgia
G/F	12	Casey Wells	6 ft 4 in (1.93 m)	180 lb (82 kg)	Jr	Atlanta, Georgia
G	15	Isaiah Felder	5 ft 11 in (1.8 m)	175 lb (79 kg)	Fr	Orangeburg, South Carolina
G	22	Dexter McClanaha	6 ft 4 in (1.93 m)	180 lb (82 kg)	Fr	Stockbridge, Georgia
F/C	23	Ibrahima Diallo	6 ft 9 in (2.06 m)	200 lb (91 kg)	Fr	Dakar, Senegal
F	30	Teslim Idris	6 ft 6 in (1.98 m)	200 lb (91 kg)	Jr	London, England
G/F	33	Ismael Iwelomen	6 ft 8 in (2.03 m)	185 lb (84 kg)	Fr	Groves Point, Michigan
F/C	34	Tyler Hagan	6 ft 7 in (2.01 m)	210 lb (95 kg)	So	Effingham, Georgia
C	44	Jason Baxter	6 ft 10 in (2.08 m)	240 lb (109 kg)	Fr	Jacksonville, Florida
G	50	Kamil Williams	6 ft 1 in (1.85 m)	195 lb (88 kg)	Fr	Palm Beach, Florida
F	55	Brian Pearson	6 ft 7 in (2.01 m)	230 lb (104 kg)	Sr	Monroe, Georgia

Head coach

- Horace Broadnax (Georgetown)

Assistant coach(es)

- Clyde Wormley (The Citadel)
- Timothy "Pat" Hardy (Savannah State)
- Joseph Flegler (Savannah State)

Legend

- (C) Team captain
- (S) Suspended
- (I) Ineligible
- (W) Walk-on
- Injured
- Current redshirt

Roster
Last update: 2015-11-17

== Schedule ==
Date time, TV	Rank^{#}	Opponent^{#}	Result	Record	Site (attendance) city, state
Exhibition
11/03/2015*; 8:00 pm		Armstrong State	W 91–84		Tiger Arena (4,650); Savannah, GA
11/09/2015*; 7:00 pm		Limestone	W 90–82		Tiger Arena (1,650); Savannah, GA
Regular season
11/13/2015*; 8:00 pm		Florida National	W 87–69	1–0	Tiger Arena (2,860); Savannah, GA
11/16/2015*; 7:00 pm		Campbell	W 59–57	2–0	Tiger Arena (1,420); Savannah, GA
11/18/2015*; 7:00 pm		Arkansas State; Global Sports Shootout	W 76–75	3–0	Tiger Arena (1,440); Savannah, GA
11/20/2015*; 11:00 pm, P12N		at No. 25 Oregon; Global Sports Shootout	L 59–77	3–1	Matthew Knight Arena (6,465); Eugene, OR
11/23/2015*; 8:00 pm, FSSW		at Baylor; Global Sports Shootout	L 61–100	3–2	Ferrell Center (4,714); Waco, TX
11/27/2015*; 8:00 pm		at Jackson State; Global Sports Shootout	L 42–69	3–3	Williams Assembly Center (587); Jackson, MS
11/29/2015*; 2:00 pm, ESPN3		at South Florida	L 57–67	3–4	USF Sun Dome (2,429); Tampa, FL
12/02/2015*; 8:00 pm		Georgia Southern	W 76–67	4–4	Tiger Arena (4,523); Savannah, GA
12/05/2015*; 4:00 pm		Eastern Kentucky	L 71–74	4–5	Tiger Arena (1,020); Savannah, GA
12/16/2015*; 8:00 pm, P12N		at Utah	L 53–99	4–6	Jon M. Huntsman Center (11,911); Salt Lake City, UT
01/02/2016*; 3:00 pm, SECN+		at Missouri	L 50–81	4–7	Mizzou Arena (6,037); Columbia, MO
01/05/2016; 7:00 pm		at Florida A&M	L 58–61	4–8 (0–1)	Teaching Gym (Florida A&M) (1,398); Tallahassee, FL
01/09/2016; 6:00 pm		North Carolina A&T	W 75–68	5–8 (1–1)	Tiger Arena (1,240); Savannah, GA
01/11/2016; 8:00 pm		North Carolina Central	L 46–69	5–9 (1–2)	Tiger Arena (1,230); Savannah, GA
01/16/2016; 6:00 pm		Maryland Eastern Shore	W 68–61	6–9 (2–2)	Tiger Arena (930); Savannah, GA
01/18/2016; 8:00 pm		Delaware State	W 64–47	7–9 (3–2)	Tiger Arena (1,020); Savannah, GA
01/23/2016; 6:00 pm		at Hampton	L 52–75	7–10 (3–3)	Hampton Convocation Center (3,521); Hampton, VA
01/25/2016; 8:00 pm		at Norfolk State	L 73–92	7–11 (3–4)	Joseph G. Echols Memorial Hall (1,812); Norfolk, VA
01/30/2016; 4:00 pm		at North Carolina A&T	L 62–63	7–12 (3–5)	Corbett Sports Center (1,461); Greensboro, NC
02/02/2016; 7:30 pm		at Bethune-Cookman	L 59–62	7–13 (3–6)	Moore Gymnasium (805); Daytona Beach, FL
02/06/2016; 8:00 pm		Morgan State	W 57–49	8–13 (4–6)	Tiger Arena (2,671); Savannah, GA
02/08/2016; 8:00 pm		Coppin State	W 72–63	9–13 (5–6)	Tiger Arena (1,211); Savannah, GA
02/13/2016; 6:00 pm		at South Carolina State	W 60–57	10–13 (6–6)	SHM Memorial Center (469); Orangeburg, SC
02/20/2016; 4:00 pm		at Howard	W 66–56	11–13 (7–6)	Burr Gymnasium (1,205); Washington, D.C.
02/23/2016*; 8:00 pm		Allen	W 83–72	12–13	Tiger Arena (1,008); Savannah, GA
02/27/2016; 6:00 pm		South Carolina State	W 76–64	13–13 (8–6)	Tiger Arena (1,801); Savannah, GA
02/29/2016; 8:00 pm		at North Carolina Central	L 44–61	13–14 (8–7)	McLendon–McDougald Gymnasium (1,427); Durham,, NC
03/03/2016; 8:00 pm		Florida A&M	W 52–40	14–14 (9–7)	Tiger Arena (2,420); Savannah, GA
MEAC tournament
03/07/2016; 5:00 pm, ESPN3	(5)	vs. (12) Delaware State; First round	W 63–58	15–14	Norfolk Scope; Norfolk, VA
03/10/2016; 8:00 pm, ESPN3	(5)	vs. (4) Bethune-Cookman; Quarterfinals	W 57–50	16–14	Norfolk Scope; Norfolk, VA
03/11/2016; 6:00 pm, ESPN3	(5)	vs. (1) Hampton; Semifinals	L 55–89	16–15	Norfolk Scope; Norfolk, VA
CIT
03/16/2016*; 7:00 pm		Texas–Arlington; First round	L 59–75	16–16	Tiger Arena (1,192); Savannah, GA
*Non-conference game. ^{#}Rankings from AP Poll. (#) Tournament seedings in parentheses. All times are in Eastern Time.
