= 2015–16 Norfolk State Spartans men's basketball team =

American college basketball season

2015–16 Norfolk State Spartans men's basketball
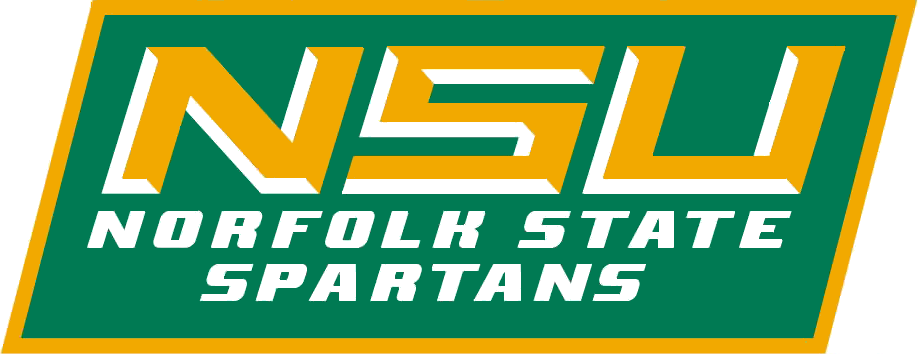

CIT, first round
- Conference: Mid-Eastern Athletic Conference
- Record: 17–17 (12–4 MEAC)
- Head coach: Robert Jones (3rd season)
- Associate head coach: Larry Vickers
- Assistant coaches: Kevin Jones; C.J. Clemons
- Home arena: Joseph G. Echols Memorial Hall

2015–16 MEAC men's basketball standings
	Conf.				Overall
Team	W		L	PCT	W		L	PCT
Hampton †	13	–	3	.813	21	–	11	.656
South Carolina State	12	–	4	.750	19	–	15	.559
Norfolk State	12	–	4	.750	17	–	17	.500
Bethune–Cookman	10	–	6	.625	14	–	18	.438
Savannah State	9	–	7	.563	16	–	16	.500
North Carolina Central	7	–	9	.438	13	–	19	.406
North Carolina A&T	7	–	9	.438	10	–	22	.313
Md. Eastern Shore	7	–	9	.438	10	–	22	.313
Howard	6	–	10	.375	12	–	20	.375
Morgan State	6	–	10	.375	9	–	22	.290
Coppin State	6	–	10	.375	9	–	22	.290
Delaware State	5	–	11	.313	7	–	25	.219
Florida A&M*	4	–	12	.250	8	–	21	.276
† 2016 MEAC tournament winner *ineligible for postseason due to APR violations As of March 18, 2016

The 2015–16 Norfolk State Spartans men's basketball team represented Norfolk State University during the 2015–16 NCAA Division I men's basketball season. The Spartans, led by third-year coach Robert Jones, played their home games at the Joseph G. Echols Memorial Hall and were members of the Mid-Eastern Athletic Conference (MEAC). They finished the season 17–17, 12–4 in MEAC play, to finish in a tie for second place. They defeated North Carolina Central in the quarterfinals of the MEAC tournament to advance to the semifinals where they lost to South Carolina State. They were invited to the CollegeInsider.com Tournament where they lost in the first round to Columbia.

== Roster ==
Number	Name	Position	Height	Weight	Year	Hometown
0	Brian Kelley	Guard	5'10"	180	Junior	Lanham, MD
1	Preston Bungei	Guard/Forward	6'6"	175	Junior	Albuquerque, NM
2	Zaynah Robinson	Guard	5'11"	170	Sophomore	Duluth, GA
3	Johnathan Wade	Guard	6'4"	195	RS Junior	Panama City, FL
4	D'Shon Taylor	Guard	6'5"	205	Senior	Nassau, Bahamas
10	Jeff Short	Guard	6'4"	205	RS Senior	The Bronx, NY
11	Kerwin Okoro	Guard	6'4"	210	Senior	Harlem, NY
15	Devonte Banner	Guard	6'1"	165	Freshman	Mount Vernon, NY
20	Charles Oliver	Guard	6'3"	215	RS Senior	Scotch Plains, NJ
22	Alex Long	Forward	6'8"	220	Freshman	Clinton, MD
30	Jeustin Peebles-Jennings	Guard	6'5"	175	Sophomore	Richmond, VA
32	Moses Toriola	Forward/Center	6'10"	230	Freshman	Lagos, Nigeria
44	Dan Robinson	Center	7'0"	225	Junior	Norfolk, VA
45	Jordan Butler	Forward	6'6"	240	Sophomore	Hartford, CT

== Schedule ==
Date time, TV	Rank^{#}	Opponent^{#}	Result	Record	Site city, state
Regular season
November 14, 2015*; 7:00 p.m., SECN+		at South Carolina	L 69–84	0–1	Colonial Life Arena (10,623); Columbia, SC
November 17, 2015*; 7:00 p.m.		Washington Adventist	W 78–58	1–1	Joseph G. Echols Memorial Hall (864); Norfolk, VA
November 20, 2015*; 8:30 p.m.		vs. Indiana State; Paradise Jam quarterfinals	L 60–71	1–2	Sports and Fitness Center (1,601); St. Thomas, USVI
November 21, 2015*; 4:00 p.m.		vs. Ohio; Paradise Jam Consolation	W 93–71	1–3	Sports and Fitness Center (2,205); St. Thomas, USVI
November 23, 2015*; 3:30 p.m., CBSSN		vs. DePaul; Paradise Jam 7th-place game	L 78–82	1–4	Sports and Fitness Center (1,433); St. Thomas, USVI
November 30, 2015*; 8:30 p.m.		at Northern Arizona	W 70–66	2–4	Walkup Skydome (967); Flagstaff, AZ
December 2, 2015*; 7:00 p.m.		Mercy	W 71–65	3–4	Joseph G. Echols Memorial Hall (1,576); Norfolk, VA
December 7, 2015; 7:30 p.m.		at Coppin State	W 88–56	4–4 (1–0)	Physical Education Complex (588); Baltimore, MD
December 13, 2015*; 7:00 p.m., ESPN3		at Northern Kentucky	L 60–81	4–5	BB&T Arena (2,351); Highland Heights, KY
December 15, 2015*; 7:00 p.m., ESPNU		at No. 23 Cincinnati	L 59–75	4–6	Fifth Third Arena (6,215); Cincinnati, OH
December 17, 2015*; 8:00 p.m., ESPN3		at Evansville	L 70–84	4–7	Ford Center (3,883); Evansville, IN
December 21, 2015*; 9:00 p.m.		at UTEP; Sun Bowl Invitational	W 85–76	5–7	Don Haskins Center (7,746); El Paso, TX
December 22, 2015*; 9:00 p.m.		vs. UC Riverside; Sun Bowl Invitational	L 62–80	5–8	Don Haskins Center (5,946); El Paso, TX
December 29, 2015*; 7:00 p.m.		at Old Dominion; Scope Series	L 57–68	5–9	Ted Constant Convocation Center (8,472); Norfolk, VA
January 2, 2016*; 7:00 p.m., SECN+		at Alabama	L 49–68	5–10	Coleman Coliseum (10,884); Tuscaloosa, AL
January 5, 2016*; 7:00 p.m.		Princeton	L 74–83	5–11	Joseph G. Echols Memorial Hall (1,011); Norfolk, VA
January 9, 2016; 6:00 p.m.		Florida A&M	W 77–56	6–11 (2–0)	Joseph G. Echols Memorial Hall (2,167); Norfolk, VA
January 11, 2016; 8:00 p.m.		Bethune-Cookman	L 70–72	6–12 (2–1)	Joseph G. Echols Memorial Hall (1,756); Norfolk, VA
January 16, 2016; 4:00 p.m.		at North Carolina Central	W 88–79	7–12 (3–1)	McLendon–McDougald Gymnasium (2,236); Durham, NC
January 18, 2016; 7:30 p.m.		at North Carolina A&T	W 75–68	8–12 (4–1)	Corbett Sports Center (1,206); Greensboro, NC
January 23, 2016; 6:00 p.m.		South Carolina State	W 87–74	9–12 (5–1)	Joseph G. Echols Memorial Hall (1,461); Norfolk, VA
January 25, 2016; 8:00 p.m.		Savannah State	W 92–73	10–12 (6–1)	Joseph G. Echols Memorial Hall (1,812); Norfolk, VA
January 30, 2016; 6:00 p.m.		at Hampton	L 76–86	10–13 (6–2)	Hampton Convocation Center (8,123); Hampton, VA
February 6, 2016; 4:00 p.m.		at Howard	W 99–92 ^{2OT}	11–13 (7–2)	Burr Gymnasium (1,550); Washington, D.C.
February 8, 2016; 7:30 p.m.		at Maryland Eastern Shore	W 76–70	12–13 (8–2)	Hytche Athletic Center (2,810); Princess Anne, MD
February 13, 2016; 6:20 p.m.		Morgan State	W 79–73	13–13 (9–2)	Joseph G. Echols Memorial Hall (2,561); Norfolk, VA
February 20, 2016; 4:00 p.m.		at Delaware State	L 64–67	13–14 (9–3)	Memorial Hall (1,846); Dover, DE
February 22, 2016; 9:00 p.m., ESPNU		Coppin State	W 85–77	14–14 (10–3)	Joseph G. Echols Memorial Hall (2,083); Norfolk, VA
February 24, 2016; 7:00 p.m.		at Morgan State	L 72–89	14–15 (10–4)	Talmadge L. Hill Field House (857); Baltimore, MD
February 29, 2016; 8:00 p.m.		Howard	W 84–66	15–15 (11–4)	Joseph G. Echols Memorial Hall (2,111); Norfolk, VA
March 3, 2016; 8:00 p.m.		Hampton	W 83–63	16–15 (12–4)	Joseph G. Echols Memorial Hall (4,500); Norfolk, VA
MEAC tournament
March 9, 2016; 8:00 p.m., ESPN3	(2)	vs. (7) North Carolina Central; Quarterfinals	W 66–47	17–15	Norfolk Scope; Norfolk, VA
March 11, 2016; 8:00 p.m., ESPN3	(2)	vs. (3) South Carolina State; Semifinals	L 65–67	17–16	Norfolk Scope; Norfolk, VA
CIT
March 16, 2016*; 7:00 p.m.		at Columbia; First round	L 54–86	17–17	Levien Gymnasium (1,037); New York City, NY
*Non-conference game. ^{#}Rankings from AP poll. (#) Tournament seedings in parentheses. All times are in Eastern.
