= 2015–16 Florida A&M Rattlers basketball team =

American college basketball season

2015–16 Florida A&M Rattlers basketball
- Conference: Mid-Eastern Athletic Conference
- Record: 8–21 (4–12 MEAC)
- Head coach: Byron Samuels (2nd season)
- Assistant coaches: Lamont Franklin; Willie Jones; Bruce Martin
- Home arena: Teaching Gym

2015–16 MEAC men's basketball standings
	Conf.				Overall
Team	W		L	PCT	W		L	PCT
Hampton †	13	–	3	.813	21	–	11	.656
South Carolina State	12	–	4	.750	19	–	15	.559
Norfolk State	12	–	4	.750	17	–	17	.500
Bethune–Cookman	10	–	6	.625	14	–	18	.438
Savannah State	9	–	7	.563	16	–	16	.500
North Carolina Central	7	–	9	.438	13	–	19	.406
North Carolina A&T	7	–	9	.438	10	–	22	.313
Md. Eastern Shore	7	–	9	.438	10	–	22	.313
Howard	6	–	10	.375	12	–	20	.375
Morgan State	6	–	10	.375	9	–	22	.290
Coppin State	6	–	10	.375	9	–	22	.290
Delaware State	5	–	11	.313	7	–	25	.219
Florida A&M*	4	–	12	.250	8	–	21	.276
† 2016 MEAC tournament winner *ineligible for postseason due to APR violations As of March 18, 2016

The 2015–16 Florida A&M Rattlers basketball team represented Florida A&M University during the 2015–16 NCAA Division I men's basketball season. The Rattlers, led by second-year head coach Byron Samuels, played their home games at the Teaching Gym in Tallahassee, Florida and were members of the Mid-Eastern Athletic Conference (MEAC). The Rattlers finished the season 8–21, 4–12 in MEAC play, to finish in 13th (last) place. Due to failing to meet APR requirements, the Rattlers were banned from postseason play including the MEAC tournament.

== Roster ==
Number	Name	Position	Height	Weight	Year	Hometown
0	Francois Lewis	Forward	6' 9"	220	Freshman	Orlando, FL
1	Nick Severado	Guard	6' 8"	190	Freshman	Savannah, GA
2	Treavann Warren	Forward	6' 8"	235	Junior	Norfolk, VA
3	Craig Bowman	Guard	6' 3"	175	Sophomore	St. Petersburg, FL
4	Elijah Mays	Guard	6' 0"	170	Junior	Orlando, FL
5	Jerran Foster	Guard	5' 9"	180	Senior	Winston-Salem, NC
10	Johnathan Spicer	Forward	6' 4"	185	Sophomore	Miami, FL
11	Malcolm Bernard	Forward	6' 6"	190	Junior	Middleburg, FL
12	Jordan Jackson	Forward	6' 10"	225	Sophomore	Roy, WA
13	Christian Wise	Guard	5' 9"	155	Freshman	Tampa, FL
15	Mario Karailiev	Center	6' 9"	230	Sophomore	Montana, Bulgaria
21	Justin Ravenal	Guard	6' 1"	175	Freshman	Lithonia, GA
24	Tre Anderson	Guard	6' 2"	170	Freshman	Tallahassee, FL
25	Jonathan Tshiteya	Guard	5' 10"	170	Freshman	Liège, Belgium
35	Isaiah Omoregie	Forward	6' 7"	225	Freshman	Tampa, FL

== Schedule ==
Date time, TV	Opponent	Result	Record	Site (attendance) city, state
Regular season
November 13, 2015*; 7:00 p.m.	Johnson (FL)	W 103–71	1–0	Teaching Gym (893); Tallahassee, FL
November 15, 2015*; 4:00 p.m., ESPN3	at Southern Illinois; Corpus Christi Coastal Classic	L 51–81	1–1	SIU Arena (4,119); Carbondale, IL
November 18, 2015*; 7:00 p.m.	Thomas	W 70–68	2–1	Teaching Gym (1,071); Tallahassee, FL
November 21, 2015*; 8:00 p.m., ESPN3	at Houston	L 52–97	2–2	Hofheinz Pavilion (3,163); Houston, TX
November 24, 2015*; 9:00 p.m.	at UTEP; Corpus Christi Coastal Classic	L 54–72	2–3	Don Haskins Center (6,682); El Paso, TX
November 27, 2015*; 3:30 p.m.	vs. Abilene Christian; Corpus Christi Coastal Classic	L 62–72	2–4	American Bank Center (176); Corpus Christi, TX
November 28, 2015*; 12:00 p.m.	vs. Alcorn State; Corpus Christi Coastal Classic	W 73–71	3–4	American Bank Center (168); Corpus Christi, TX
December 2, 2015*; 7:00 p.m., ESPN3	at Kennesaw State	L 41–61	3–5	KSU Convocation Center (2,058); Kennesaw, GA
December 5, 2015; 6:00 p.m.	South Carolina State	L 67–79	3–6 (0–1)	Teaching Gym (890); Tallahassee, FL
December 12, 2015; 4:00 p.m.	Samford	L 67–86	3–7	Teaching Gym (593); Tallahassee, FL
December 15, 2015; 7:00 p.m.	Southeastern Louisiana	W 67–64	4–7	Teaching Gym (383); Tallahassee, FL
December 19, 2015; 7:00 p.m., ESPN3	at North Florida	L 70–87	4–8	UNF Arena (1,618); Jacksonville, FL
December 21, 2015; 7:00 p.m., ESPN3	at Jacksonville	L 66–68	4–9	Swisher Gymnasium (537); Jacksonville, FL
December 29, 2015; 7:00 p.m.	at FIU	L 45–65	4–10	FIU Arena (923); Miami, FL
January 5, 2016; 7:00 p.m.	Savannah State	W 61–58	5–10 (1–1)	Teaching Gym (1,398); Tallahassee, FL
January 9, 2016; 6:00 p.m.	at Norfolk State	L 56–77	5–11 (1–2)	Joseph G. Echols Memorial Hall (2,167); Norfolk, VA
January 11, 2016; 7:00 p.m.	at Hampton	W 71–65 ^{OT}	5–12 (1–3)	Hampton Convocation Center (3,456); Hampton, VA
January 16, 2016; 6:00 p.m.	Morgan State	W 72–65	6–12 (2–3)	Teaching Gym (2,679); Tallahassee, FL
January 18, 2016; 8:00 p.m.	Coppin State	L 66–70	6–13 (2–4)	Teaching Gym (2,789); Tallahassee, FL
January 30, 2016; 4:00 p.m.	at Bethune–Cookman	L 56–88	6–14 (2–5)	Moore Gymnasium (1,090); Daytona Beach, FL
February 1, 2016; 8:00 p.m.	North Carolina Central	L 63–81	6–15 (2–6)	Teaching Gym (1,738); Tallahassee, FL
February 8, 2016; 8:00 p.m.	Delaware State	W 96–95 ^{2OT}	7–15 (3–6)	Teaching Gym; Tallahassee, FL
February 13, 2016; 4:00 p.m.	at North Carolina A&T	L 68–75	7–16 (3–7)	Corbett Sports Center (1,063); Greensboro, NC
February 15, 2016; 7:30 p.m.	at North Carolina Central	L 74–79	7–17 (3–8)	McLendon–McDougald Gymnasium (1,478); Durham, NC
February 20, 2016; 4:00 p.m.	Bethune–Cookman	L 54–55	7–18 (3–9)	Teaching Gym (6,211); Tallahassee, FL
February 22, 2016; 7:30 p.m.	at Maryland Eastern Shore; Postponed from January 25	W 81–80 ^{2OT}	8–18 (4–9)	Hytche Athletic Center (1,134); Princess Anne, MD
February 24, 2016; 7:30 p.m.	at Howard; Postponed from January 23	L 53–63	8–19 (4–10)	Burr Gymnasium (950); Washington, D.C.
February 27, 2016; 6:00 p.m.	North Carolina A&T	L 70–77 ^{OT}	8–20 (4–11)	Teaching Gym (2,116); Tallahassee, FL
March 3, 2016; 8:00 p.m.	at Savannah State	L 40–52	8–21 (4–12)	Tiger Arena (2,420); Savannah, GA
*Non-conference game. ^{#}Rankings from AP poll. (#) Tournament seedings in parentheses. All times are in Eastern.
