= 2015–16 Bethune–Cookman Wildcats men's basketball team =

American college basketball season

2015–16 Bethune–Cookman Wildcats men's basketball
- Conference: Mid-Eastern Athletic Conference
- Record: 14–18 (10–6 MEAC)
- Head coach: Gravelle Craig (5th season)
- Assistant coach: Rodney Martin; Stacy Beckton; Chrys Cornelius
- Home arena: Moore Gymnasium

2015–16 MEAC men's basketball standings
	Conf.				Overall
Team	W		L	PCT	W		L	PCT
Hampton †	13	–	3	.813	21	–	11	.656
South Carolina State	12	–	4	.750	19	–	15	.559
Norfolk State	12	–	4	.750	17	–	17	.500
Bethune–Cookman	10	–	6	.625	14	–	18	.438
Savannah State	9	–	7	.563	16	–	16	.500
North Carolina Central	7	–	9	.438	13	–	19	.406
North Carolina A&T	7	–	9	.438	10	–	22	.313
Md. Eastern Shore	7	–	9	.438	10	–	22	.313
Howard	6	–	10	.375	12	–	20	.375
Morgan State	6	–	10	.375	9	–	22	.290
Coppin State	6	–	10	.375	9	–	22	.290
Delaware State	5	–	11	.313	7	–	25	.219
Florida A&M*	4	–	12	.250	8	–	21	.276
† 2016 MEAC tournament winner *ineligible for postseason due to APR violations As of March 18, 2016

The 2015–16 Bethune–Cookman Wildcats men's basketball team represented Bethune–Cookman University during the 2015–16 NCAA Division I men's basketball season. The Wildcats, led by fifth year head coach Gravelle Craig, played their home games at the Moore Gymnasium and were members of the Mid-Eastern Athletic Conference. They finished the season 14–18, 10–6 in MEAC play to finish in fourth place. They lost in the quarterfinals of the MEAC tournament to Savannah State.

== Roster ==
Number	Name	Position	Height	Weight	Year	Hometown
1	Josue Salaam	Guard	6–4	210	Junior	San Francisco, California
2	Diamante Lewis	Forward	6–3	195	Junior	Ocala, Florida
3	LaRon Smith	Forward	6–8	215	Junior	Palm Bay, Florida
5	Denzel Dulin	Guard	6–4	200	Senior	Queens, New York
10	Jordan Potts	Guard	5–10	185	Junior	Columbus, Ohio
11	Marquel Ingram	Guard	6–2	200	Freshman	Detroit, Michigan
12	Quinton Forrest	Guard	6–5	210	Freshman	Windermere, Florida
15	Randy Holmes	Forward	6–5	200	Junior	St. Louis, Missouri
22	Ricky Johnson	Guard	5–9	160	Senior	Akron, Ohio
23	Mario Moody	Forward	6–7	215	Senior	East Orange, New Jersey
32	Ulmer Manzie	Forward	6–7	235	Freshman	Columbus, Ohio

== Schedule ==
Date time, TV	Rank^{#}	Opponent^{#}	Result	Record	Site (attendance) city, state
Regular season
11/13/2015*; 7:00 pm		Trinity College	W 108–54	1–0	Moore Gymnasium (898); Daytona Beach, FL
11/16/2015*; 8:00 pm		at UT Martin	W 86–79	2–0	Skyhawk Arena (1,108); Martin, TN
11/21/2015*; 6:00 pm		at Richmond; Las Vegas Invitational	L 64–89	2–1	Robins Center (5,635); Richmond, VA
11/23/2015*; 7:00 pm, RTPT		at West Virginia; Las Vegas Invitational	L 44–97	2–2	WVU Coliseum (6,196); Morgantown, WV
11/26/2015*; 9:00 pm		vs. Stetson; Las Vegas Invitational	L 70–83	2–3	Orleans Arena; Paradise, NV
11/27/2015*; 2:30 pm		vs. Sam Houston State; Las Vegas Invitational	L 46–71	2–4	Orleans Arena; Paradise, NV
12/03/2015*; 7:00 pm		Trinity Baptist	W 78–49	3–4	Moore Gymnasium (587); Daytona Beach, FL
12/07/2015; 7:30 pm		South Carolina State	W 69–54	4–4 (1–0)	Moore Gymnasium (993); Daytona Beach, FL
12/12/2015*; 4:00 pm		at Akron	L 60–81	4–5	James A. Rhodes Arena (2,828); Akron, OH
12/16/2015*; 7:30 pm		The Citadel	L 87–99	4–6	Moore Gymnasium (202); Daytona Beach, FL
12/19/2015*; 7:30 pm		at Toledo	L 68–102	4–7	Savage Arena (4,029); Toledo, OH
12/22/2015*; 7:00 pm		at UCF	L 96–101 ^{OT}	4–8	CFE Arena (3,734); Orlando, FL
12/28/2015*; 7:00 pm		at Brown	L 73–81	4–9	Pizzitola Sports Center (774); Providence, RI
12/31/2015*; 7:00 pm		at Jacksonville	L 70–74	4–10	Swisher Gymnasium (273); Jacksonville, FL
01/03/2016*; 5:00 pm		at Grand Canyon	L 53–74	4–11	GCU Arena (4,719); Phoenix, AZ
01/09/2016; 6:00 pm		at Hampton	L 70–75	4–12 (1–1)	Hampton Convocation Center (3,543); Hampton, VA
01/11/2016; 8:00 pm		at Norfolk State	W 72–70	5–12 (2–1)	Joseph G. Echols Memorial Hall (1,756); Norfolk, VA
01/16/2016; 4:00 pm		Coppin State	L 54–62	5–13 (2–2)	Moore Gymnasium (698); Daytona Beach, FL
01/18/2016; 7:30 pm		Morgan State	W 62–50	6–13 (3–2)	Moore Gymnasium (863); Daytona Beach, FL
01/23/2016; 4:00 pm		at Maryland Eastern Shore	L 72–74	6–14 (3–3)	Hytche Athletic Center (932); Princess Anne, MD
01/25/2016; 7:30 pm		at Howard	L 68–70	6–15 (3–4)	Burr Gymnasium (1,605); Washington, D.C.
01/30/2016; 4:00 pm		Florida A&M	W 88–56	7–15 (4–4)	Moore Gymnasium (1,090); Daytona Beach, FL
02/02/2016; 7:30 pm		Savannah State	W 62–59	8–15 (5–4)	Moore Gymnasium (805); Daytona Beach, FL
02/06/2016; 4:00 pm		Delaware State	W 85–56	9–15 (6–4)	Moore Gymnasium (487); Daytona Beach, FL
02/13/2016; 4:00 pm		at North Carolina Central	L 66–90	9–16 (6–5)	McLendon–McDougald Gymnasium (1,362); Durham,, NC
02/15/2016; 7:30 pm		at North Carolina A&T	W 83–77	10–16 (7–5)	Corbett Sports Center (823); Greensboro, NC
02/20/2016; 4:00 pm		at Florida A&M	W 55–54	11–16 (8–5)	Teaching Gym (6,211); Tallahassee, FL
02/22/2016*; 7:30 pm		at Stetson	W 96–94 ^{OT}	12–16	Edmunds Center (1,269); DeLand, FL
02/27/2016; 4:00 pm		North Carolina Central	W 69–61	13–16 (9–5)	Moore Gymnasium (881); Daytona Beach, FL
02/29/2016; 7:30 pm		North Carolina A&T	W 62–52	14–16 (10–5)	Moore Gymnasium (3,000); Daytona Beach, FL
03/03/2016; 7:30 pm		at South Carolina State	L 72–85	14–17 (10–6)	SHM Memorial Center (532); Orangeburg, SC
MEAC tournament
03/10/2016; 8:00 pm, ESPN3	(4)	vs. (5) Savannah State; Quarterfinals	L 50–57	14–18	Norfolk Scope; Norfolk, VA
*Non-conference game. ^{#}Rankings from AP Poll. (#) Tournament seedings in parentheses. All times are in Eastern Time.
