= 2015–16 Delaware State Hornets men's basketball team =

American college basketball season

2015–16 Delaware State Hornets men's basketball
- Conference: Mid-Eastern Athletic Conference
- Record: 7–25 (5–11 MEAC)
- Head coach: Keith Walker (2nd season)
- Assistant coaches: Keith Johnson; Kevin Washington; Arthur Tyson
- Home arena: Memorial Hall

2015–16 MEAC men's basketball standings
	Conf.				Overall
Team	W		L	PCT	W		L	PCT
Hampton †	13	–	3	.813	21	–	11	.656
South Carolina State	12	–	4	.750	19	–	15	.559
Norfolk State	12	–	4	.750	17	–	17	.500
Bethune–Cookman	10	–	6	.625	14	–	18	.438
Savannah State	9	–	7	.563	16	–	16	.500
North Carolina Central	7	–	9	.438	13	–	19	.406
North Carolina A&T	7	–	9	.438	10	–	22	.313
Md. Eastern Shore	7	–	9	.438	10	–	22	.313
Howard	6	–	10	.375	12	–	20	.375
Morgan State	6	–	10	.375	9	–	22	.290
Coppin State	6	–	10	.375	9	–	22	.290
Delaware State	5	–	11	.313	7	–	25	.219
Florida A&M*	4	–	12	.250	8	–	21	.276
† 2016 MEAC tournament winner *ineligible for postseason due to APR violations As of March 18, 2016

The 2015–16 Delaware State Hornets men's basketball team represented Delaware State University during the 2015–16 NCAA Division I men's basketball season. The Hornets, led by second year head coach Keith Walker, played their home games at Memorial Hall and were members of the Mid-Eastern Athletic Conference. They finished the season 7–25, 5–11 record in MEAC play to finish in a tie for 12th place. They lost to Savannah State in the first round of the MEAC tournament.

== Roster ==
Number	Name	Position	Height	Weight	Year	Hometown
0	Quincy Tillinghast	Guard	6–0	175	Sophomore	Cincinnati, Ohio
1	DeAndre Haywood	Guard	6–2	200	Junior	Paterson, New Jersey
3	Scott Sill	Forward	6–9	215	Junior	Windsor, Connecticut
4	Cahli Thomas	Guard	6–1	180	Junior	Washington, D.C.
5	Malik Carter	Guard	6–2	180	Sophomore	Philadelphia, Pennsylvania
10	Kavon Waller	Forward	6–5	210	Sophomore	Chester, Virginia
11	Devin Morgan, Jr.	Guard	5–10	180	Freshman	Chester, Virginia
12	Joseph Lewis	Forward/Center	6–9	225	Junior	Detroit, Michigan
13	Mahir Johnson	Guard	6–2	185	Freshman	Chester, Pennsylvania
15	Jamelle Christian	Guard	6–1	190	Freshman	Washington, D.C.
20	Mrdjan Gasevic	Forward/Center	6–8	235	Junior	Mladenovac, Serbia
21	Dana Raysor	Guard/Forward	6–5	200	Sophomore	Willingboro, New Jersey
22	Aric Dickerson	Guard/Forward	6–6	200	Senior	Chicago, Illinois
23	Jason Owens	Forward	6–6	232	Senior	Seaford, Delaware
24	Artem Tavakalyan	Forward	6–6	210	Sophomore	Moscow, Russia
35	Todd Hughes	Guard	6–3	185	Sophomore	Smyrna, Delaware
44	DeVaughn Mallory	Forward	6–7	200	Freshman	Dover, Delaware
55	Demola Onifade	Center	6–9	245	Freshman	Lagos, Nigeria

== Schedule ==
Date time, TV	Rank^{#}	Opponent^{#}	Result	Record	Site (attendance) city, state
Regular season
11/13/2015*; 8:00 pm		Delaware	L 56–62	0–1	Memorial Hall (1,584); Dover, DE
11/17/2015*; 7:00 pm		Penn	L 54–60	0–2	Memorial Hall (1,058); Dover, DE
11/19/2015*; 8:00 pm		at Nebraska	L 60–75	0–3	Pinnacle Bank Arena (15,447); Lincoln, NE
11/21/2015*; 12:00 pm		Lamar; Roundball Showcase	L 66–77	0–4	Memorial Hall (209); Dover, DE
11/24/2015*; 10:00 pm		at UC Riverside; Roundball Showcase	L 55–81	0–5	UC Riverside Student Recreation Center (562); Riverside, CA
11/27/2015*; 10:00 pm		at Fresno State; Roundball Showcase	L 59–80	0–6	Save Mart Center (5,959); Fresno, CA
11/29/2015*; 3:00 pm		at San Francisco; Roundball Showcase	L 47–67	0–7	War Memorial Gymnasium (1,148); San Francisco, CA
12/04/2015*; 7:00 pm		at Old Dominion	L 38–82	0–8	Ted Constant Convocation Center (6,764); Norfolk, VA
12/12/2015*; 12:00 pm, ESPNU		at Michigan	L 33–80	0–9	Crisler Center (10,599); Ann Arbor, MI
12/15/2015*; 9:00 pm		at Grand Canyon	L 59–88	0–10	GCU Arena (5,223); Phoenix, AZ
12/19/2015*; 4:00 pm, ESPN3		at Temple	L 63–78	0–11	Liacouras Center (4,578); Philadelphia, PA
12/22/2015*; 9:00 pm, P12N		at Utah	L 58–105	0–12	Jon M. Huntsman Center (12,041); Salt Lake City, UT
12/28/2015*; 8:00 pm, FSSW+		at TCU	L 47–75	0–13	Schollmaier Arena (5,024); Fort Worth, TX
01/04/2016*; 7:00 pm		Summit	W 93–44	1–13	Memorial Hall (239); Dover, DE
01/09/2016; 4:00 pm		at Morgan State	L 58–63	1–14 (0–1)	Talmadge L. Hill Field House (1,109); Baltimore, MD
01/16/2016; 4:00 pm		at South Carolina State	L 79–90	1–15 (0–2)	SHM Memorial Center (476); Orangeburg, SC
01/18/2016; 8:00 pm		at Savannah State	L 47–64	1–16 (0–3)	Tiger Arena (1,020); Savannah, GA
01/20/2016; 4:30 pm		Howard; Postponed from 1/11/16	L 67–71	1–17 (0–4)	Memorial Hall (1,685); Dover, DE
01/25/2016; 7:30 pm		North Carolina A&T	W 57–55	2–17 (1–4)	Memorial Hall (1,084); Dover, DE
01/27/2016; 7:00 pm		North Carolina Central; Postponed from 1/23/16	W 71–60	3–17 (2–4)	Memorial Hall (1,371); Dover, DE
01/30/2016; 4:00 pm		South Carolina State	L 41–56	3–18 (2–5)	Memorial Hall (968); Dover, DE
02/01/2016*; 7:00 pm		Cheyney	W 86–70	4–18	Memorial Hall (1,387); Dover, DE
02/06/2016; 4:00 pm		at Bethune-Cookman	L 56–85	4–19 (2–6)	Moore Gymnasium (487); Daytona Beach, FL
02/08/2016; 8:00 pm		at Florida A&M	L 95–96 ^{2OT}	4–20 (2–7)	Teaching Gym; Tallahassee, FL
02/13/2016; 4:00 pm		Maryland Eastern Shore	L 71–75	5–20 (3–7)	Memorial Hall (1,983); Dover, DE
02/15/2016; 7:30 pm		at Coppin State	W 71–67	6–20 (4–7)	Physical Education Complex (533); Baltimore, MD
02/20/2016; 4:00 pm		Norfolk State	W 67–64	7–20 (5–7)	Memorial Hall (1,846); Dover, DE
02/22/2016; 7:30 pm		Hampton	L 72–82	7–21 (5–8)	Memorial Hall (1,254); Dover, DE
02/27/2016; 4:00 pm		at Maryland Eastern Shore	L 65–74	7–22 (5–9)	Hytche Athletic Center (3,002); Princess Anne, MD
02/29/2016; 7:30 pm		at Hampton	L 65–79	7–23 (5–10)	Hampton Convocation Center (4,123); Hampton, VA
03/03/2016; 7:30 pm		Coppin State	L 62–72	7–24 (5–11)	Memorial Hall (1,236); Dover, DE
MEAC tournament
03/07/2016; 5:00 pm, ESPN3	(12)	vs. (5) Savannah State; First Round	L 58–63	7–25	Norfolk Scope; Norfolk, VA
*Non-conference game. ^{#}Rankings from AP Poll. (#) Tournament seedings in parentheses. All times are in Eastern Time.
