= 2016 MEAC men's basketball tournament =

- Classification: Division I
- Season: 2015–16
- Teams: 12
- Site: Norfolk Scope; Norfolk, Virginia
- Champions: Hampton (6th title)
- Winning coach: Edward Joyner (3rd title)
- MVP: Reginald Johnson (Hampton)
- Television: ESPN3, ESPN2

2015–16 MEAC men's basketball standings
	Conf.				Overall
Team	W		L	PCT	W		L	PCT
Hampton †	13	–	3	.813	21	–	11	.656
South Carolina State	12	–	4	.750	19	–	15	.559
Norfolk State	12	–	4	.750	17	–	17	.500
Bethune–Cookman	10	–	6	.625	14	–	18	.438
Savannah State	9	–	7	.563	16	–	16	.500
North Carolina Central	7	–	9	.438	13	–	19	.406
North Carolina A&T	7	–	9	.438	10	–	22	.313
Md. Eastern Shore	7	–	9	.438	10	–	22	.313
Howard	6	–	10	.375	12	–	20	.375
Morgan State	6	–	10	.375	9	–	22	.290
Coppin State	6	–	10	.375	9	–	22	.290
Delaware State	5	–	11	.313	7	–	25	.219
Florida A&M*	4	–	12	.250	8	–	21	.276
*ineligible for postseason due to APR violations
† 2016 MEAC tournament winner As of March 18, 2016

The 2016 MEAC men's basketball tournament took place March 8–12, 2016 at the Norfolk Scope in Norfolk, Virginia The champion received the conference's automatic bid to the 2016 NCAA tournament.

== Seeds ==
The top 12 teams were eligible for the tournament, Florida A&M was ineligible for postseason play due to APR Sanctions.

Teams were seeded by record within the conference, with a tiebreaker system to seed teams with identical conference records.

Seed	School	Conference	Tiebreaker
1	Hampton	13–3	
2	Norfolk State	12–4	1–0 vs. South Carolina State
3	South Carolina State	12–4	0–1 vs. Norfolk State
4	Bethune-Cookman	10–6	
5	Savannah State	9–7	
6	North Carolina A&T	7–9	2–0 vs. North Carolina Central, 1–0 vs. Maryland Eastern Shore
7	North Carolina Central	7–9	1–0 vs. Maryland Eastern Shore, 0–2 vs. North Carolina A&T
8	Maryland Eastern Shore	7–9	0–1 vs. North Carolina A&T, 0–1 vs. North Carolina Central
9	Morgan State	6–10	2–0 vs. Coppin State, 1–0 vs. Howard
10	Howard	6–10	1–1 vs. Coppin State, 0–1 vs. Morgan State
11	Coppin State	6–10	1–1 vs. Howard, 0–2 vs. Morgan State
12	Delaware State	5–11	
† – MEAC regular season champions. Overall records are as of the end of the regular season.

== Schedule ==
Session	Game	Time*	Matchup^{#}	Score	Television
First round – Monday, March 7
1	1	5:00 pm	#5 Savannah State vs. #12 Delaware State	63–58	ESPN3
1	2	7:00 pm	#6 North Carolina A&T vs. #11 Coppin State	91–98^{2OT}	ESPN3
First round – Tuesday, March 8
2	3	4:00 pm	#8 Maryland Eastern Shore vs. #9 Morgan State	58–65	ESPN3
2	4	6:00 pm	#7 North Carolina Central vs. #10 Howard	68–66	ESPN3
Quarterfinals – Wednesday, March 9
4	5	6:00 pm	#1 Hampton vs. #9 Morgan State	83–81	ESPN3
4	6	8:00 pm	#2 Norfolk State vs. #7 North Carolina Central	66–47	ESPN3
Quarterfinals – Thursday, March 10
5	7	6:00 pm	#3 South Carolina State vs. #11 Coppin State	90–80	ESPN3
5	8	8:00 pm	#4 Bethune-Cookman vs. #5 Savannah State	50–57	ESPN3
Semifinals – Friday, March 11
6	9	6:00 pm	#1 Hampton vs. #5 Savannah State	89–55	ESPN3
6	10	8:00 pm	#2 Norfolk State vs. #3 South Carolina State	67–65	ESPN3
Championship – Saturday, March 12
7	11	1:00pm	#1 Hampton vs. #3 South Carolina State	81–69	ESPN2
*Game times in EST. #-Rankings denote tournament seeding.

== Bracket ==
First round March 7/8
8	Maryland Eastern Shore	58
9	Morgan State	65
5	Savannah State	63
12	Delaware State	58
7	North Carolina Central	68
10	Howard	66
6	North Carolina A&T	91
11	Coppin State	98**

Quarterfinals; March 9/10
1	Hampton	83
9	Morgan State	81
4	Bethune-Cookman	50
5	Savannah State	57
2	Norfolk State	66
7	North Carolina Central	47
3	South Carolina State	90
11	Coppin State	80

Semifinals; March 11
1	Hampton	89
5	Savannah State	55
2	Norfolk State	65
3	South Carolina State	67

Championship; March 12
1	Hampton	81
3	South Carolina State	69

* denotes overtime period
