= 2015–16 North Carolina Central Eagles men's basketball team =

American college basketball season

2015–16 North Carolina Central Eagles men's basketball
- Conference: Mid-Eastern Athletic Conference
- Record: 13–19 (7–9 MEAC)
- Head coach: LeVelle Moton (7th season)
- Assistant coaches: Chris Skinkis; Chuck Taylor; Eric Wilson
- Home arena: McLendon–McDougald Gymnasium

2015–16 MEAC men's basketball standings
	Conf.				Overall
Team	W		L	PCT	W		L	PCT
Hampton †	13	–	3	.813	21	–	11	.656
South Carolina State	12	–	4	.750	19	–	15	.559
Norfolk State	12	–	4	.750	17	–	17	.500
Bethune–Cookman	10	–	6	.625	14	–	18	.438
Savannah State	9	–	7	.563	16	–	16	.500
North Carolina Central	7	–	9	.438	13	–	19	.406
North Carolina A&T	7	–	9	.438	10	–	22	.313
Md. Eastern Shore	7	–	9	.438	10	–	22	.313
Howard	6	–	10	.375	12	–	20	.375
Morgan State	6	–	10	.375	9	–	22	.290
Coppin State	6	–	10	.375	9	–	22	.290
Delaware State	5	–	11	.313	7	–	25	.219
Florida A&M*	4	–	12	.250	8	–	21	.276
† 2016 MEAC tournament winner *ineligible for postseason due to APR violations As of March 18, 2016

The 2015–16 North Carolina Central Eagles men's basketball team represented North Carolina Central University during the 2015–16 NCAA Division I men's basketball season. The Eagles, led by seventh year head coach LeVelle Moton, played their home games at the McLendon–McDougald Gymnasium and were members of the Mid-Eastern Athletic Conference. They finished the season 13–19, 7–9 in MEAC play to finish in a three way tie for sixth place. They defeated Howard in the first round of the MEAC tournament to advance to the quarterfinals where they lost to Norfolk State.

== Roster ==
Number	Name	Position	Height	Weight	Year	Hometown
0	Dante Holmes	Guard	6–3	190	Senior	Baltimore, Maryland
1	Jay Copeland Jr.	Forward	6–7	255	Senior	Suffolk, Virginia
2	A.J. Lynch	Guard	6–3	190	Junior	Mobile, Alabama
3	Rashawun Madison	Guard	6–0	175	Senior	Norfolk, Virginia
4	Kevin Crawford II	Guard	6–1	150	Junior	Blythewood, South Carolina
10	C.J. Wiggins	Guard	5–11	170	Freshman	Richmond, Virginia
11	Patrick Cole	Guard	6–5	210	Junior	Newark, New Jersey
12	Jeremiah Ingram	Guard	6–7	210	Senior	Detroit, Michigan
13	Enoch Hood	Forward	6–9	205	Senior	Norfolk, Virginia
20	Jamal Ferguson	Guard	6–5	185	Junior	Norfolk, Virginia
22	Kyle Benton	Forward	6–7	230	Junior	Long Beach, California
23	Nate Allen	Guard	6–4	205	Freshman	Toledo, Ohio
25	Marius McAllister	Guard	6–5	205	Sophomore	Durham, North Carolina
35	Dajuan Graf	Guard	6–0	185	Junior	Charlotte, North Carolina

== Schedule ==
Date time, TV	Rank^{#}	Opponent^{#}	Result	Record	Site (attendance) city, state
Regular season
11/13/2015*; 7:00 pm, ESPN3		at Clemson	L 40–74	0–1	Bon Secours Wellness Arena (5,742); Greenville, SC
11/16/2015*; 8:00 pm		Allen	W 78–54	1–1	McLendon–McDougald Gymnasium (2,176); Durham, NC
11/22/2015*; 12:00 pm		at LIU Brooklyn	L 77–78	1–2	Barclays Center (1,274); Brooklyn, NY
11/24/2015*; 7:30 pm		at Quinnipiac	L 59–69	1–3	TD Bank Sports Center (713); Hamden, CT
11/27/2015*; 7:30 pm		at Louisiana Tech	L 50–71	1–4	Thomas Assembly Center (4,227); Ruston, LA
12/03/2015*; 7:00 pm		Mississippi Valley State	W 86–79	2–4	McLendon–McDougald Gymnasium (1,133); Durham, NC
12/05/2015; 4:00 pm		Maryland Eastern Shore	W 70–59	3–4 (1–0)	McLendon–McDougald Gymnasium (1,056); Durham, NC
12/07/2015; 7:30 pm		Howard	L 69–71	3–5 (1–1)	McLendon–McDougald Gymnasium (1,226); Durham, NC
12/14/2015*; 7:00 pm		at Marshall; Global Sports Classic	L 73–92	3–6	Cam Henderson Center (4,178); Huntington, WV
12/16/2015*; 8:00 pm, ESPN3		at Houston; Global Sports Classic	L 65–73	3–7	Hofheinz Pavilion (3,342); Houston, TX
12/21/2015*; 4:30 pm		vs. Southern; Global Sports Classic	L 63–68	3–8	Cox Pavilion; Paradise, NV
12/22/2015*		vs. Eastern Illinois; Global Sports Classic	W 57–52	4–8	Cox Pavilion; Paradise, NV
12/29/2015*; 7:00 pm		Montreat	W 107–68	5–8	McLendon–McDougald Gymnasium (687); Durham, NC
12/31/2015*; 2:00 pm, SECN+		at Mississippi State	L 48–71	5–9	Humphrey Coliseum (2,016); Starkville, MS
01/04/2016*; 8:00 pm		East Tennessee State	L 68–72	5–10	McLendon–McDougald Gymnasium (881); Durham, NC
01/06/2016*; 7:00 pm		Johnson & Wales–Charlotte	W 78–70	6–10	McLendon–McDougald Gymnasium (805); Durham, NC
01/09/2016; 4:00 pm		at South Carolina State	L 75–91	6–11 (1–2)	SHM Memorial Center; Orangeburg, SC
01/11/2016; 8:00 pm		at Savannah State	W 69–46	7–11 (2–2)	Tiger Arena (1,230); Savannah, GA
01/16/2016; 4:00 pm		Norfolk State	L 79–88	7–12 (2–3)	McLendon–McDougald Gymnasium (2,236); Durham, NC
01/18/2016; 7:30 pm, ESPNU		Hampton	L 79–80	7–13 (2–4)	McLendon–McDougald Gymnasium (3,065); Durham, NC
01/27/2016; 7:00 pm		at Delaware State; Postponed from 1/23/16	L 60–71	7–14 (2–5)	Memorial Hall (1,371); Dover, DE
02/01/2016; 8:00 pm		at Florida A&M	W 81–63	8–14 (3–5)	Teaching Gym (1,738); Tallahassee, FL
02/06/2016; 4:00 pm		at North Carolina A&T	L 63-67	8-15 (3-6)	McLendon–McDougald Gymnasium (1,362); Durham, NC
02/13/2016; 4:00 pm		at Bethune-Cookman	W 90–66	9–15 (4–6)	McLendon–McDougald Gymnasium (1,362); Durham, NC
02/15/2016; 7:30 pm		at Florida A&M	W 79–74	10–15 (5–6)	McLendon–McDougald Gymnasium (1,478); Durham, NC
02/18/2016; 7:30 pm		at Coppin State; Postponed from 1/25/16	L 60–71	10–16 (5–7)	Physical Education Complex; Baltimore, MD
02/20/2016; 4:00 pm		at Morgan State	W 73–59	11–16 (6–7)	Talmadge L. Hill Field House (1,104); Baltimore, MD
02/27/2016; 4:00 pm		at Bethune-Cookman	L 61–69	11–17 (6–8)	Moore Gymnasium (881); Daytona Beach, FL
02/29/2016; 7:30 pm		at Savannah State	W 61–44	12–17 (7–8)	McLendon–McDougald Gymnasium (1,427); Durham, NC
03/03/2016; 7:30 pm		at North Carolina A&T	L 87–93	12–18 (7–9)	Corbett Sports Center (5,700); Greensboro, NC
MEAC tournament
03/08/2016; 6:00 pm, ESPN3	(7)	vs. (10) Howard; First round	W 68–66	13–18	Norfolk Scope; Norfolk, VA
03/09/2016; 8:00 pm, ESPN3	(7)	vs. (2) Norfolk State; Quarterfinals	L 47–66	13–19	Norfolk Scope; Norfolk, VA
*Non-conference game. ^{#}Rankings from AP Poll. (#) Tournament seedings in parentheses. All times are in Eastern Time. (#) during NIT is seed within region.
