= Aaron Holiday =

American basketball player (born 1996)

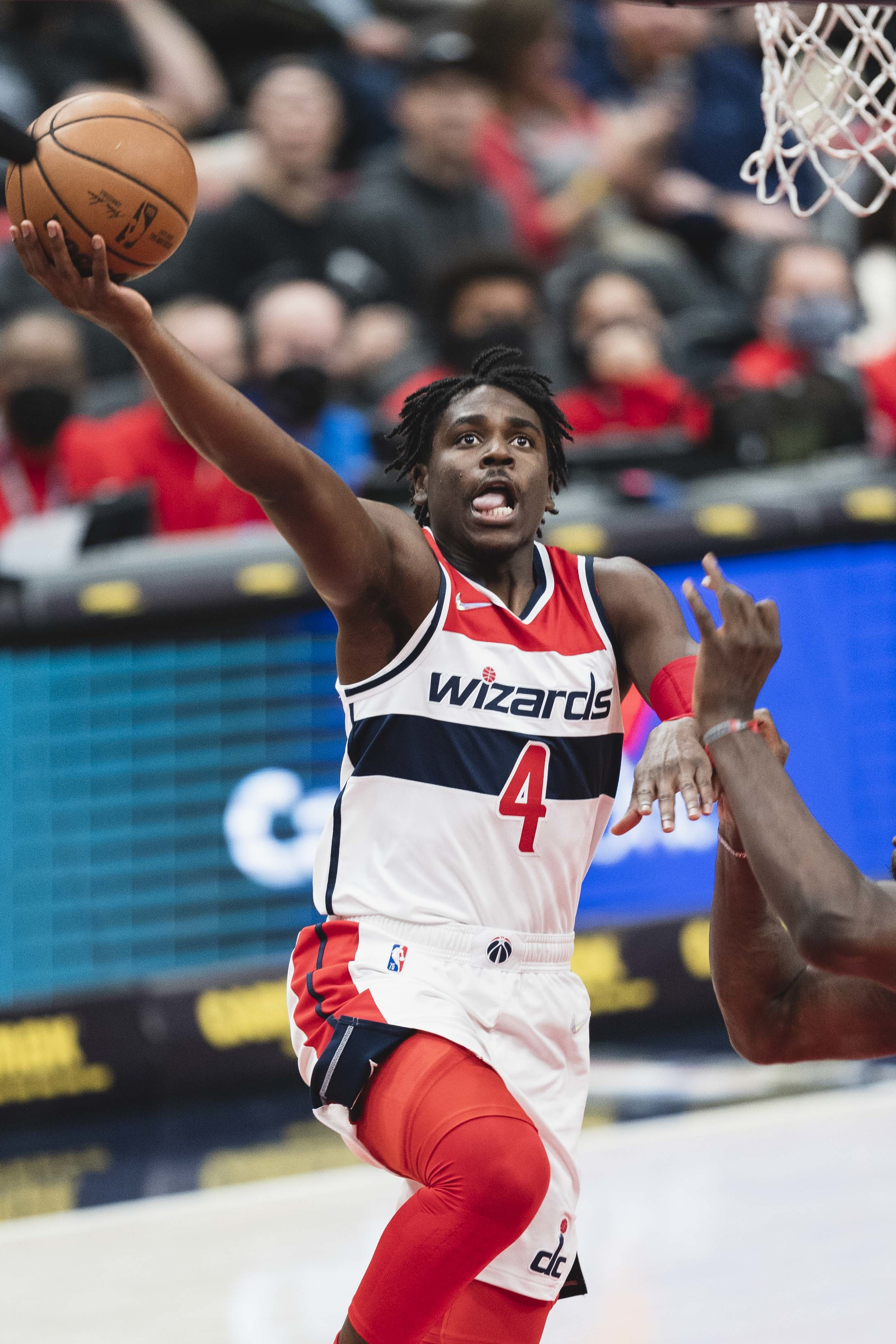
- Holiday with the Washington Wizards in 2021

No. 3 – Maxima Roma
- Position: Point guard
- League: LBA; EuroCup

Personal information
- Born: September 30, 1996 (age 30) Ruston, Louisiana, U.S.
- Listed height: 6 ft 0 in (1.83 m)
- Listed weight: 185 lb (84 kg)

Career information
- High school: Campbell Hall (Los Angeles, California)
- College: UCLA (2015–2018)
- NBA draft: 2018: 1st round, 23rd overall pick
- Drafted by: Indiana Pacers
- Playing career: 2018–present

Career history
- 2018–2021: Indiana Pacers
- 2021–2022: Washington Wizards
- 2022: Phoenix Suns
- 2022–2023: Atlanta Hawks
- 2023–2026: Houston Rockets
- 2026–present: Maxima Roma

Career highlights
- Third-team All-American – SN (2018); First-team All-Pac-12 (2018); Pac-12 All-Defensive Team (2018)
- Stats at NBA.com
- Stats at Basketball Reference

Aaron Shawn Holiday (born September 30, 1996) is an American professional basketball player for Maxima Roma of the Italian Lega Basket Serie A (LBA) and the EuroCup. He played college basketball for the UCLA Bruins, where he earned All-American recognition. He was selected by the Indiana Pacers in the first round of the 2018 NBA draft with the 23rd overall pick.

Holiday played in high school in Los Angeles, where he was ranked among the top players nationally. He was a starter as a college freshman in 2015–16 before becoming the Bruins' leading reserve the following year. As a junior, he returned to the starting lineup as the Bruins' point guard, when he was named a third-team All-American and received first-team all-conference and all-defensive honors in the Pac-12. He played three seasons for Indiana before being traded to the Washington Wizards and later to the Phoenix Suns. Holiday is the younger brother of the current NBA player Jrue Holiday, and former NBA player Justin Holiday.

== Early life ==
Holiday was born in Ruston, Louisiana, to Shawn and Toya (née DeCree) Holiday. His parents both played college basketball at Arizona State, where Toya was named Pac-10 Player of the Year in 1982. Holiday attended high school at Campbell Hall in Los Angeles, where he was a four-year starter. As a freshman, he led the team in scoring, averaging 24.3 points per game. He averaged 28.9 points, 8.5 rebounds, and 6.0 assists as a junior before being named both CIF Southern Section IV-A and Los Angeles Daily News Player of the Year honors.

Holiday improved as a facilitator as a senior, when his scoring dropped, but his passing enabled other teammates to emerge as scoring threats. Averaging 25 points, 8.5 rebounds, 4.5 assists and 2.5 steals, he led Campbell Hall to its first sectional and California regional final since 2008, and shared Daily News Player of the Year honors with Bennie Boatwright of Village Christian Schools. Holiday was rated a four-star college recruit as one of the top prep players in the nation, ranked No. 40 by Scout.com, No. 60 by Rivals.com, and No. 88 by ESPN.com.

== College career ==
=== Freshman season ===
Holiday entered the University of California, Los Angeles, with a reputation as a tenacious defender capable of applying full-court pressure. After an exhibition game against the Bruins, Cal State Los Angeles coach Dieter Horton admired his ability to disrupt, calling him a "little Tasmanian devil on defense". Holiday and fellow recruit Prince Ali brought needed depth to UCLA, who were thin at guard during the previous season. In Holiday, Bruins' third-year coach Steve Alford possessed the most natural point guard he had had at the school. He hoped the freshman could help ease ball-handling duties from incumbent point guard Bryce Alford, the coach's son, who was more effective catching the ball and shooting. In a scrimmage against San Diego State which Bryce Alford mostly missed due to an injury, Holiday's performance against a strong Aztecs defense prompted their coach, Steve Fisher, to call him "by far the best player on the floor".

UCLA opened the 2015–16 season with Holiday as starter, along with Alford and Isaac Hamilton, in a three-guard lineup. Hamilton could also play point guard, but Holiday and Alford shared most of the responsibilities. In the season opener, Holiday and Tony Parker had six turnovers apiece as UCLA turned the ball over 23 times in an 84–81 overtime loss to Monmouth. On December 3, 2015, Holiday had 10 points, seven assists, and eight rebounds in an 87–77 upset over No. 1 Kentucky, the Bruins' first win over a top-ranked opponent since 2003. On January 9, 2016, he made the go-ahead three-point field goal with just over a minute remaining in an 81–74 win over Arizona State, which helped UCLA avoid falling to 1–3 in the Pac-12 Conference for the first time in almost 20 years. However, the Bruins lost their final five games of the season to finish with a 15–17 record. Holiday started all 32 games during the season, averaging 10.3 points while leading the team in both steals (1.4) and three-point field goal percentage (41.9), which also ranked sixth in the Pac-12. He was second on the team in assists (4.0). His 127 assists were the fifth-highest freshman total in school history, and the most by a UCLA freshman since his brother Jrue had 129 in 2008–09.

=== Sophomore season ===
In 2016–17, Holiday was moved to the bench and became the Bruins' sixth man as star freshman point guard Lonzo Ball joined seniors Alford and Hamilton in the starting lineup. Despite a drop in playing time from his freshman season, Holiday had a better season by comparison. He did not complain about his new role, and thrived while continuing to receive starter-like playing time as the Bruins frequently used a four-guard lineup. On December 3, 2016, he scored 13 points and had four assists to lead No. 11 UCLA to a 97–92 road win over No. 1 Kentucky, ending the Wildcats' 42-game home winning streak. He led the team in scoring in the first half, when he made all four of his shot attempts and scored all of his 13 points as the Bruins built a 49–45 lead. His performance amidst Ball's struggles early in the game was lauded by the Los Angeles Times, ESPN.com, and NBCSports.com for changing the course of the game. UCLA earned a No. 3 seed in the 2017 NCAA tournament. With Ball slowed by a hip injury in their opening game against Kent State, Holiday had 15 points and a career-high 11 assists off the bench to help the Bruins win 97–80. The Bruins ended the season 31–5 after losing in the Sweet 16 to Kentucky. For the season, Holiday averaged 12.3 points and 4.4 assists in over 26 minutes per game, and he received honorable mention for the Pac-12 All-Defensive Team. Although he was not listed in most mock drafts, he declared for the 2017 NBA draft. Later, he withdrew his name from the draft to retain his college eligibility.

=== Junior season ===
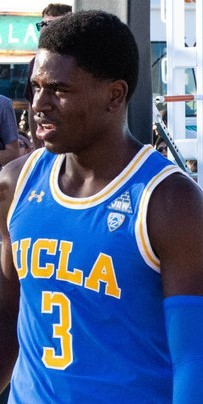
Holiday was named a third-team All-American as a junior with UCLA in 2018.

Holiday assumed the starting point guard role in the 2017–18 season after Ball was drafted with the No. 2 overall pick by the Los Angeles Lakers. UCLA lost four starters from the previous year, leaving Holiday as the team's leading returning scorer. He and five-star freshman recruit Jaylen Hands gave the Bruins two fast guards capable of handling the ball, and they were expected to play alongside each other as well as share point guard duties. Against Wisconsin in the CBE Hall of Fame Classic, Holiday made a layup with 0.8 seconds left in the game to give UCLA a 72–70 win. On December 9, 2017, he had then-career highs of 27 points and seven turnovers as UCLA had 20 turnovers and blew a 15-point, second-half lead in a 78–69 overtime loss to Michigan. On December 23, Holiday had 20 points and eight assists to offset another seven turnovers in an 83–75 upset over No. 7 Kentucky. The performance helped him earn Pac-12 Player of the Week honors for the first time in his career. On December 29 in UCLA's conference opener, Holiday scored 23 of the Bruins' first 32 points, including 15 straight, and finished with a career-high 33 points in a 96–82 win over Washington State. He added 11 rebounds and four assists and did not commit a turnover while playing all 40 minutes. He was the first UCLA player to have at least 33 points and 11 rebounds in a game since Ed O'Bannon in 1995. (Note: O'Bannon had 37 points and 13 rebounds against Duke on February 26, 1995.)

On February 15, 2018, Holiday scored 17 points and had a season-high 10 assists in a 75–68 win over Oregon State. The next contest in their final home game of the season, the Bruins won 86–78 in overtime against Oregon behind Holiday's 29 points and six assists. UCLA blew a double-digit lead in the second half when the Ducks went on a 13–0 run after Holiday went to the bench in foul trouble. Coach Alford stated that Holiday's value was underscored by the team's plus–minus when he is out of the game, and he called his star guard a candidate for Pac-12 Player of the Year. After leading the Bruins' sweep of the Oregon schools, Holiday was named Pac-12 Player of the Week for the second time. In the regular-season finale, Holiday scored the team's final nine points and finished with a career-high 34 points on 11-of-16 shooting with seven assists in an 87–72 victory over USC, completing a season sweep in their crosstown rivalry and clinching a bye and the No. 4 seed for the Bruins in the upcoming Pac-12 tournament. He was named Pac-12 Player of the Week for a third time, which led the conference. In UCLA's Pac-12 Tournament opener, Holiday scored 34 points for the second consecutive game and added eight assists and seven rebounds to lead an 88–77 win over Stanford. He played all 40 minutes of the game for the fourth time in five contests. The Bruins qualified for the 2018 NCAA tournament, but lost 65–58 to St. Bonaventure in the First Four for the Bonnies' first tournament win in 48 years. Holiday scored 20 points and committed a career-high 10 turnovers, but also led a defense that limited Jaylen Adams to eight points on 2-for-16 shooting.

Holiday finished the season averaging a Pac-12 leading 20.3 points per game and ranked second with 5.8 assists while playing in a conference-high 37.7 minutes per game. He was the school's first player to average at least 20 points since O'Bannon in 1994–95, and the first to lead the conference in scoring since Reggie Miller in 1985–86. He also became the second Bruin to average at least 19 points and five assists, joining Bill Walton in 1973–74. Holiday was voted third-team All-American by the Sporting News, and was also named first-team All-Pac-12. Regularly assigned to defend the opponent's top guard, he earned Pac-12 All-Defensive Team honors. After the season, Holiday decided to forgo his senior year at UCLA and declare for the NBA draft, where he was projected to be as high as a mid-to-late first-round selection.

== Professional career ==
=== Indiana Pacers (2018–2021) ===
Holiday was selected by the Indiana Pacers in the first round of the 2018 NBA draft with the 23rd overall pick, and signed a three-year contract worth $6,496,800. Entering the 2018–19 season, Indiana coach Nate McMillan figured it would be difficult for him to receive consistent playing time behind veteran point guards Darren Collison and Cory Joseph, while Tyreke Evans and Victor Oladipo were capable of handling the ball and running the point as well. On November 17, 2018, Holiday scored 12 points and made three 3-pointers in 15 minutes to lead a 97–89 comeback win over the Atlanta Hawks. He had a team-high nine points in the fourth quarter in a game which the Pacers played mostly without their leading-scorer Oladipo. Holiday had not played in the previous nine games, and had logged just 16 minutes all season. "We don't win this game if he doesn't come in and play this game the way he did at both ends of the floor," McMillan said. With Oladipo out the following game, Holiday scored 19 points and had seven rebounds in 21 minutes in a 121–94 win over the Utah Jazz.

Oladipo missed 11 games before returning, during which Holiday averaged 8.0 points on 42.9 percent shooting, 2.9 rebounds, and 1.9 assists in 16.6 minutes. The Pacers went back to their earlier rotation without Holiday, but he returned in the end of January 2019 after Oladipo suffered a season-ending right knee injury. On February 5 against the Los Angeles Lakers, he scored 17 points while shooting 7-of-10, including 3-of-4 from 3-point range, as the Pacers won 136–94 to hand LeBron James the most lopsided loss (42 points) of his career. However, Holiday fell out of the rotation again after Indiana acquired guard Wesley Matthews later in the month. Holiday appeared in 50 games during the regular season, averaging 5.9 points while making 40 percent of his field goals, including 34 percent on 3-pointers. He played sparingly in the playoffs, when the Pacers were swept 4–0 in the first round by the Boston Celtics.

During the offseason, Holiday was joined on the Pacers by his older brother Justin, who signed a one-year contract as a free agent. On December 28, 2019, Holiday scored a career-high 25 points in a 120–98 loss to the New Orleans Pelicans. On December 28 against New Orleans, he and brothers Justin and Jrue, a member of the Pelicans at the time, became the first trio of brothers to share an NBA court simultaneously. In late January 2020, Holiday fell out of the rotation after Oladipo recovered from his knee injury and made his season debut; T. J. McConnell had supplanted Holiday as the backup to starter Malcolm Brogdon. However, Holiday worked better with the starting unit, and he started 33 starts when the team dealt with injuries.

Prior to the start of the 2020–21 season, the Pacers exercised their fourth-year option on Holiday's rookie contract for $3.9 million. Under new head coach Nate Bjorkgren, his playing time decreased before the NBA All-Star break. The team was using McConnell more at point guard, and Edmond Sumner was also cutting into Holiday's time at shooting guard. Holiday missed the last four games of the regular season with an injured big toe, but returned for the play-in games. He averaged 7.2 points for the season and made 36.8% of his 3-pointers, both drop-offs off from his second season.

=== Washington Wizards (2021–2022) ===
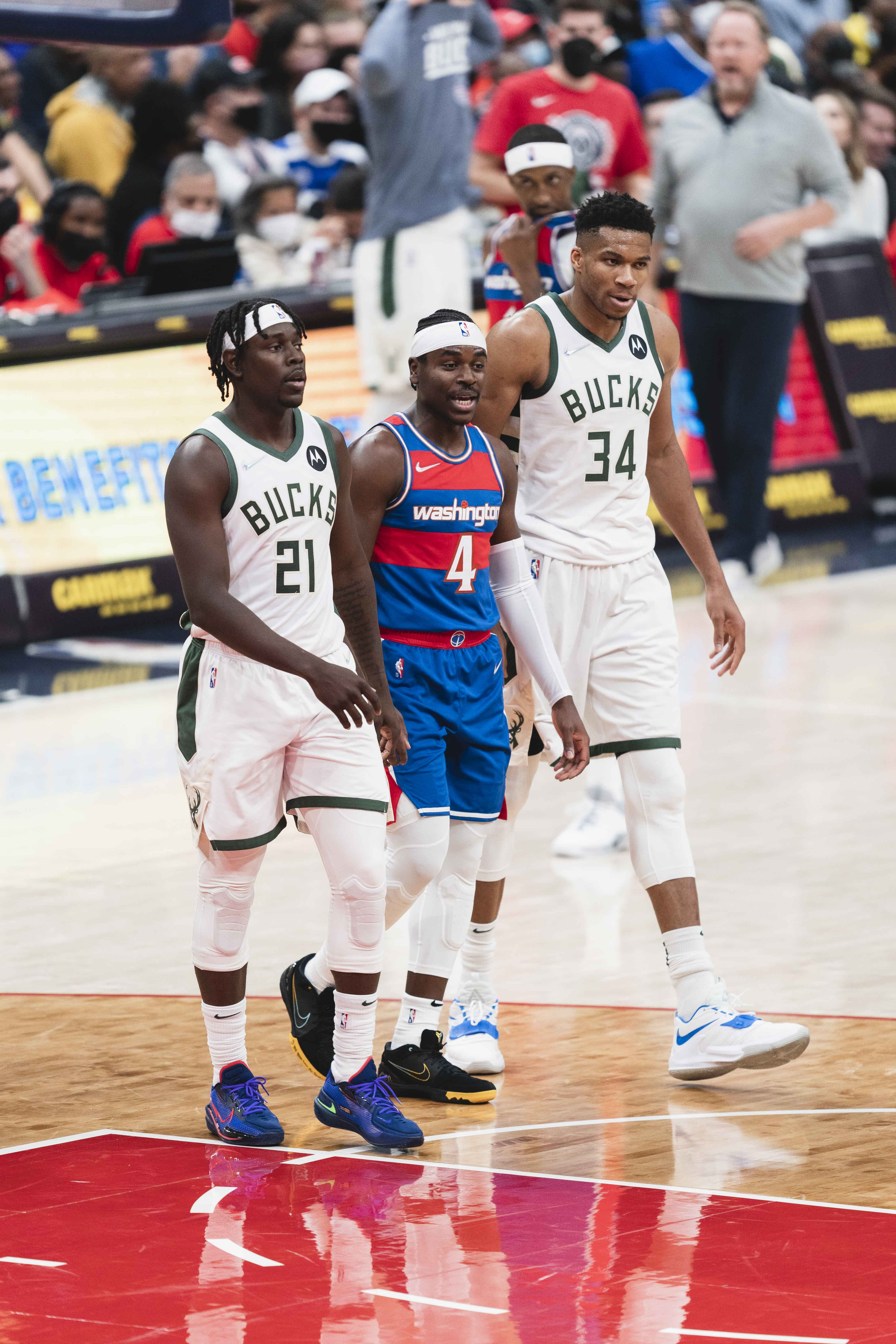
Holiday (center) with his brother Jrue (left) of the Milwaukee Bucks in 2021

On August 6, 2021, Holiday and the rights to draft pick Isaiah Todd were traded from Indiana to the Washington Wizards in a multi-player, five-team deal. Against his former team on October 23, he started in place of an injured Bradley Beal and scored seven points in 25 minutes in an overtime win against the Pacers. Holiday's playing time decreased as the season progressed, although he did start the last four games leading up to the season's trade deadline.

=== Phoenix Suns (2022) ===
On February 10, 2022, Holiday was traded to the Phoenix Suns for cash considerations and a trade exception. At the time, he was averaging 6.1 points and 1.9 assists per game for Washington, while shooting a career-high 47% on his field goals. He averaged 6.8 points per game in 22 games for the Suns.

=== Atlanta Hawks (2022–2023) ===
Holiday signed with the Atlanta Hawks for the 2022–23 season, which reunited him with his former Pacers coach Nate McMillan as well as his brother Justin. McMillan was fired midseason, replaced by Quin Snyder, and Justin was traded as well. In the playoffs, Holiday was not in the team's rotation, as the Hawks lost to the Celtics in the opening round.

=== Houston Rockets (2023–2026) ===
On July 10, 2023, Holiday signed a minimum deal with the Houston Rockets. On July 6, 2024, he re-signed with the Rockets on a two-year, $9.5 million contract.

On July 10, 2025, Holiday re-signed with the Rockets on a one-year minimum contract.

=== Maxima Roma (2026–present) ===
On August 19, 2026, Holiday signed with Maxima Roma of the Italian Lega Basket Serie A (LBA).

== Career statistics ==
Legend
| GP | Games played | GS | Games started | MPG | Minutes per game |
| FG% | Field goal percentage | 3P% | 3-point field goal percentage | FT% | Free throw percentage |
| RPG | Rebounds per game | APG | Assists per game | SPG | Steals per game |
| BPG | Blocks per game | PPG | Points per game | **Bold** | Career high |

=== NBA ===
==== Regular season ====
| Year | Team | GP | GS | MPG | FG% | 3P% | FT% | RPG | APG | SPG | BPG | PPG |
|---|---|---|---|---|---|---|---|---|---|---|---|---|
| 2018–19 | Indiana | 50 | 0 | 12.9 | .401 | .339 | .820 | 1.3 | 1.7 | .4 | **.3** | 5.9 |
| 2019–20 | Indiana | 66 | **33** | **24.5** | .414 | .394 | .851 | 2.4 | **3.4** | **.8** | .2 | **9.5** |
| 2020–21 | Indiana | 66 | 8 | 17.8 | .390 | .368 | .819 | 1.3 | 1.9 | .7 | .2 | 7.2 |
| 2021–22 | Washington | 41 | 14 | 16.2 | **.467** | .343 | .800 | 1.6 | 1.9 | .6 | .2 | 6.1 |
| 2021–22 | Phoenix | 22 | 1 | 16.3 | .411 | **.444** | **.939** | **2.5** | **3.4** | **.8** | .0 | 6.8 |
| 2022–23 | Atlanta | 63 | 6 | 13.4 | .418 | .409 | .844 | 1.2 | 1.4 | .6 | .2 | 3.9 |
| 2023–24 | Houston | **78** | 1 | 16.3 | .446 | .387 | .921 | 1.6 | 1.8 | .5 | .1 | 6.6 |
| 2024–25 | Houston | 62 | 3 | 12.8 | .437 | .398 | .829 | 1.3 | 1.3 | .3 | .2 | 5.5 |
| 2025–26 | Houston | 57 | 1 | 13.7 | .417 | .394 | .854 | 1.0 | 1.1 | .5 | .1 | 5.5 |
| Career | | 505 | 67 | 16.1 | .421 | .384 | .852 | 1.5 | 1.9 | .6 | .2 | 6.4 |

==== Playoffs ====
| Year | Team | GP | GS | MPG | FG% | 3P% | FT% | RPG | APG | SPG | BPG | PPG |
|---|---|---|---|---|---|---|---|---|---|---|---|---|
| 2019 | Indiana | 3 | 0 | 4.3 | .400 | .500 | — | .0 | .0 | .0 | .0 | 1.7 |
| 2020 | Indiana | 4 | **2** | **18.0** | **.571** | .444 | **.600** | **1.3** | **2.5** | **1.0** | .0 | **7.8** |
| 2022 | Phoenix | **6** | 0 | 3.3 | **.571** | **.714** | .000 | .5 | 1.5 | .5 | **.2** | 3.5 |
| 2023 | Atlanta | 1 | 0 | 4.0 | — | — | — | .0 | 1.0 | .0 | .0 | .0 |
| 2025 | Houston | 3 | 0 | 9.0 | .400 | .400 | .500 | .7 | 1.0 | .0 | .0 | 4.0 |
| 2026 | Houston | **6** | 0 | 11.2 | .273 | .267 | — | .3 | .5 | .3 | **.2** | 2.7 |
| Career | | 23 | 2 | 8.8 | .444 | .421 | .500 | .5 | 1.1 | .4 | .1 | 3.7 |

=== College ===
| Year | Team | GP | GS | MPG | FG% | 3P% | FT% | RPG | APG | SPG | BPG | PPG |
|---|---|---|---|---|---|---|---|---|---|---|---|---|
| 2015–16 | UCLA | 32 | 32 | 31.7 | .394 | .419 | .727 | 3.0 | 4.0 | **1.4** | **.3** | 10.3 |
| 2016–17 | UCLA | **36** | 0 | 26.4 | **.485** | .411 | .793 | 2.9 | 4.4 | 1.1 | .2 | 12.3 |
| 2017–18 | UCLA | 33 | **33** | **37.7** | .461 | **.429** | **.828** | **3.7** | **5.8** | 1.3 | .2 | **20.3** |
| Career | | 101 | 65 | 31.8 | .450 | .422 | .795 | 3.2 | 4.7 | 1.2 | .2 | 14.3 |

== Personal life ==
Holiday is the youngest of four children, all of whom became basketball players. His brothers Justin and Jrue are also NBA players, and sister Lauren played on the Bruins women's basketball team. Additionally, Holiday is a brother-in-law of U.S. women's national soccer team player Lauren Holiday (née Cheney). On May 14, 2020, Holiday married Ashli Scott and together they have three children, with a step-daughter from Ashli's previous relationship with NBA player Solomon Hill.
