= Isaac Hamilton =

American basketball player (born 1994)

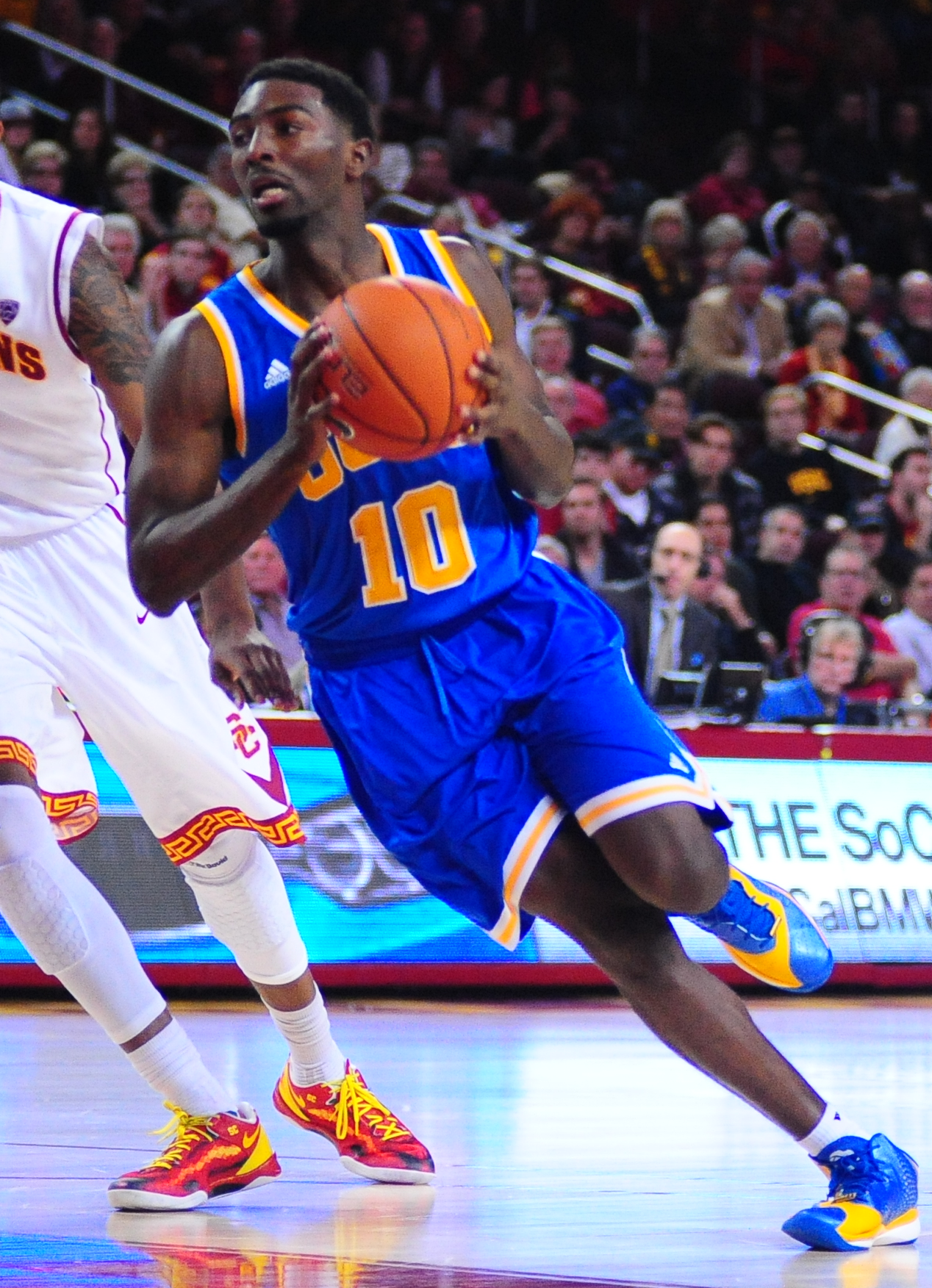
- Hamilton with UCLA in 2015

Personal information
- Born: May 14, 1994 (age 32) Los Angeles, California, U.S.
- Listed height: 6 ft 5 in (1.96 m)
- Listed weight: 200 lb (91 kg)

Career information
- High school: Crenshaw (Los Angeles, California); St. John Bosco (Bellflower, California)
- College: UCLA (2013–2017)
- NBA draft: 2017: undrafted
- Playing career: 2017–present
- Position: Shooting guard / point guard

Career history
- 2017–2019: Canton Charge
- 2019–2020: AEK Larnaca
- 2020–2021: Giessen 46ers
- 2021–2024: Cherkaski Mavpy
- 2025–2026: Caballeros de Culiacán
- 2025–2026: Mineros de Zacatecas
- 2026: Halcones de Ciudad Obregón

Career highlights
- Cypriot League All-Star (2019); Second-team All-Pac-12 (2016); McDonald's All-American (2013)
- Stats at Basketball Reference

Isaac Brandon Hamilton (born May 14, 1994) is an American professional basketball player for Cherkaski Mavpy of the Ukrainian Basketball SuperLeague. He played college basketball for the UCLA Bruins, earning second-team all-conference honors in the Pac-12 as a junior in 2015–16.

Hamilton grew up in the Los Angeles area, where he was among the top high school players. As a senior in 2013, he captured all-state honors in California, and was nationally recognized as a McDonald's All-American. He originally signed a National Letter of Intent (NLI) to attend the University of Texas at El Paso (UTEP), but decided to transfer to the University of California, Los Angeles (UCLA). Hamilton was required to sit out his freshman year after UTEP would not grant him a release from his commitment. He played his first year in college in 2014–15 as a sophomore with the Bruins, and he led the team in scoring as a junior. After going undrafted in the 2017 NBA draft, he played two seasons with the Canton Charge in the NBA G League.

== Early life ==
Hamilton was born in Los Angeles to Greg and Karen Hamilton. He attended his first two years of high school at Crenshaw High School in South Los Angeles. He helped lead Crenshaw to the 2010 Coliseum League title in his freshman year. He averaged 19.5 points per game as a sophomore, when he teamed with his younger brother Daniel, who averaged almost 10 points as a freshman. The following season, the brothers transferred to St. John Bosco High School in Bellflower. As a junior, Hamilton was voted third-team all-state by Cal-Hi Sports after averaging 24.3 points, 9.6 rebounds, and 5.4 assists and leading his team to the SoCal Div. III Regional final. In his senior year, he averaged 22.1 points, 5.7 rebounds and 4.5 assists per game, and St. John Bosco captured a CIF Southern Section Class 3A title, its first since 2003. He was named first-team all-state by Cal-Hi Sports, and was recognized nationally as a McDonald's All-American.

Hamilton was rated by Rivals.com as the No. 14 player overall in the country in the class of 2013, and ESPN ranked him No. 25. Rivals had him as the No. 3 shooting guard, and Scout.com listed him as No. 5.

== College career ==
In November 2012, Hamilton signed an NLI to play with the UTEP Miners. However, he later requested a release, citing a desire to attend a school closer to home, preferably in Los Angeles, to be with his grandmother, who was sick with a heart condition. His younger brother, Daniel chose to go to school at UCONN even though his grandmother was sick, causing many to speculate that Isaac's reasoning was false. However, UTEP coach Tim Floyd would not grant his release. One reason the coach cited was his belief that USC Trojans coach Andy Enfield had tampered with Hamilton. Even as a freshman, Hamilton was projected to be UTEP's best player. He appealed the case, but it was denied by the NLI appeals committee. Hamilton had since enrolled at UCLA. He lost a year of eligibility and was not allowed to play for the Bruins until the following year as a sophomore. The rules permitted him to practice with the team, during which his play impressed coach Steve Alford.

Eligible to play in 2014–15, Hamilton was expected to play a prominent role for the Bruins. Three of UCLA's top four scorers from the previous year had moved on to play professionally in the National Basketball Association (NBA). Given the team's limited depth at guard, the team was expected to be heavily dependent on their backcourt trio of Hamilton, senior Norman Powell, and sophomore Bryce Alford—the coach's son. Although he had never been a point guard before, Hamilton was expected to become a combo guard and be the team's No. 2 ballhandler behind Alford. He was rusty after not having played for 18 months, and had an up-and-down season. On November 28, 2014, he scored a team-high 21 points at the Battle 4 Atlantis, helping UCLA salvage a win in the seventh-place game. Just a day earlier, he had missed all six of his shots and committed seven turnovers due to poor decisions and bad passes in a loss to North Carolina. Soon his ball-handling opportunities began to wane. Towards the middle of the season, Hamilton at times would again assume the point guard role for the Bruins, and Alford would shift to being a scorer. In February 2015, Hamilton enjoyed games of 16 points and nine assists against Oregon State, as well as 16 and 10 against Washington. However, he was also limited to two points against Oregon and four versus Arizona. In the quarterfinals of the 2015 Pac-12 tournament, Hamilton made 13 of 17 field goal attempts to score a career-high 36 points in a 96–70 win over USC. His grandmother had died just four days earlier, but he decided to play as the Bruins were still fighting to qualify for the NCAA tournament. It was the most points scored by a Bruin in a decade, (Note: Dijon Thompson scored 39 against Arizona State on February 10, 2005.) and was just the second time Hamilton had scored over 20 points that season.

Hamilton opened 2015–16 as part of a three-guard lineup, with Alford and freshman Aaron Holiday sharing most of the point guard responsibilities. In December 2015, Hamilton had five consecutive games with eight or more field goals, the longest streak by a Bruin since Tracy Murray's six games in 1991. In February 2016, he became the first Bruin since Kevin Love in 2008 to score in double figures for more than 20 straight games. Hamilton finished the season as the team's leading scorer with 16.8 points per game, which ranked third in the Pac-12. He earned second-team All-Pac-12 honors, the only player from UCLA named to the all-conference team.

As a senior in 2016–17, Hamilton was the top returning scorer in the Pac-12. Still, he willingly deferred to star freshmen Lonzo Ball and T. J. Leaf, and became the fourth leading scorer (14.1) on the highest-scoring team in the nation. Hamilton was a steady performer for UCLA as they began the season ranked No. 2 after a 13–0 start, the first time they were undefeated in non-conference play since they won a national championship in 1994–95. He was the team's leading scorer through 11 games, and averaged 16.8 points and reached double-figures in all non-conference games. However, Hamilton's average fell to 11.4 points in Pac-12 games, when he shot just 31.2% on three-pointers. He scored in single figures eight times, including the first three games to start conference play. He scored just two points on 1-for-6 shooting in the conference opener against No. 21 Oregon, when the Bruins suffered their first defeat in an 89–87 loss. In the following game, he was held scoreless on 0-for-10 shooting in a 76–63 win over Oregon State. After a month-long shooting slump, during which he never divulged a pulled back muscle that required a doctor's visit, Hamilton made a UCLA record nine three-pointers against Arizona State to tie the mark held by Alford and Jason Kapono. The Bruins won 102–80, and Hamilton finished with a season-high 33 points on 10-for-17 shooting. He cooled off the following game, scoring 14 points on five-of-15 shooting in a 96–85 defeat to No. 14 Arizona for the Bruins first home loss of the season. In the Pac-12 tournament, Hamilton averaged a team-high 21.0 points, but the Bruins were eliminated in the semifinals.

== Professional career ==
After going undrafted in the 2017 NBA draft, Hamilton played with the Indiana Pacers in the 2017 NBA Summer League, and averaged 5.3 points in 14.2 minutes in three games. After a brief stint with the Cleveland Cavaliers in the 2017 preseason, he joined the Canton Charge, the Cavaliers' NBA G League team, as an affiliate player. The following offseason, he signed training-camp contract with the Cavaliers, but was waived before camp started. His contract included an Exhibit 10, which left him eligible to receive a bonus if he re-signed with the Charge. Hamilton was named to the Charge's training camp roster.

Hamilton played with AEK Larnaca B.C. in the Cypriot Basketball League in 2019–20, and was named a Cyprus League All-Star in 2020. He averaged 12.7 points, 3.3 rebounds and 2 assists per game. On August 6, 2020, Hamilton signed with Giessen 46ers of the Basketball Bundesliga. He averaged 8.2 points, 2.3 rebounds, and 1.6 assists per game. On September 22, 2021, Hamilton signed with Cherkaski Mavpy of the Ukrainian Basketball SuperLeague.

== College statistics ==
Year	Team	GP	GS	MPG	FG%	3P%	FT%	RPG	APG	SPG	BPG	PPG
2014–15	UCLA	36	36	33.9	.409	.388	.688	3.4	3.2	.9	.2	10.6
2015–16	UCLA	32	32	35.3	.472	.377	.805	4.2	3.3	1.0	.1	16.8
2016–17	UCLA	36	36	30.0	.453	.366	.825	3.6	2.8	.7	.2	14.1
Career		104	104	33.0	.448	.376	.773	3.7	3.1	.9	.1	13.7

== Awards and honors ==
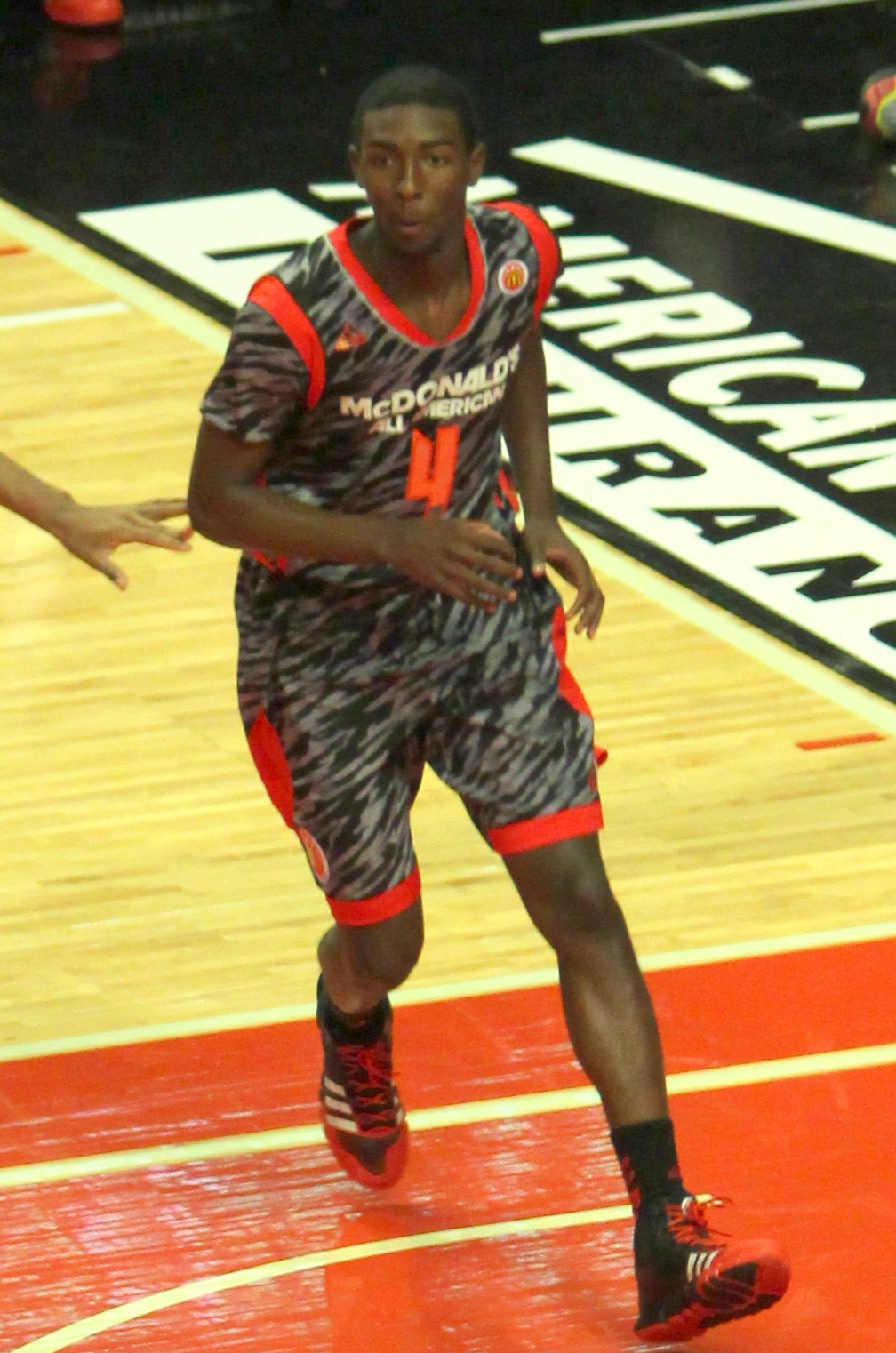
Hamilton in the 2013 McDonald's All-American Game

- Second-team All-Pac-12 (2016)
- McDonald's All-American (2013)
- Cal-Hi Sports first-team all-state (2013)
- CIF Southern Section 3A Player of the Year (2013)
- John R. Wooden High School Player of the Year (2013)
- Los Angeles Times All-Area (2013)
- 2× All-CIF Southern Section Division 3A (2012–2013)
- 2× First-team All-Trinity League (2012–2013)
- Cal-Hi Sports third-team all-state (2012)
- First-team All-CIF City Section (2011)

== Personal life ==
Hamilton's younger brother, Daniel, played college ball at Connecticut. Their older brother Jordan played collegiately at Texas before playing professionally in the NBA.
