= 2015–16 Pac-12 Conference men's basketball season =

2015–16 Pac-12 men's basketball season
- League: NCAA Division I
- Sport: Basketball
- Teams: 12
- TV partner(s): ESPN, ESPN2, ESPNU, Fox Sports 1, FOX, Pac-12 Network, CBS

Regular Season
- Season champions: Oregon
- Runners-up: Utah
- Season MVP: Jakob Pöltl, Utah

Tournament
- Champions: Oregon
- Runners-up: Utah
- Finals MVP: Elgin Cook, Oregon

Basketball seasons
- ← 14–15 16–17 →

2015–16 Pac-12 Conference men's basketball standings
	Conf.				Overall
Team	W		L	PCT	W		L	PCT
No. 5 Oregon †	14	–	4	.778	31	–	7	.816
No. 13 Utah	13	–	5	.722	27	–	9	.750
No. 17 Arizona	12	–	6	.667	25	–	9	.735
No. 23 California	12	–	6	.667	23	–	11	.676
Colorado	10	–	8	.556	22	–	12	.647
USC	9	–	9	.500	21	–	13	.618
Oregon State	9	–	9	.500	19	–	13	.594
Washington	9	–	9	.500	19	–	15	.559
Stanford	8	–	10	.444	15	–	15	.500
UCLA	6	–	12	.333	15	–	17	.469
Arizona State	5	–	13	.278	15	–	17	.469
Washington State	1	–	17	.056	9	–	22	.290
† Pac-12 Tournament winner Rankings from AP poll

The 2015–16 Pac-12 Conference men's basketball season began with practices in October 2015 and ended with the 2016 Pac-12 Conference men's basketball tournament in March 2016 at the MGM Grand Garden Arena in Paradise, Nevada. The regular season began on the first weekend of November 2015, with the conference schedule starting in December 2015.

This was the fifth season under the Pac-12 Conference name and the 57th since the conference was established under its current charter as the Athletic Association of Western Universities in 1959. Including the history of the Pacific Coast Conference, which operated from 1915 to 1959 and is considered by the Pac-12 as a part of its own history, this was the Pac-12's 101st season of men's basketball.

== Preseason ==
- October 15, 2015 – Pac-12 Men's Basketball Media Day, Pac-12 Networks Studios, San Francisco

Men's Basketball Media Preseason Poll
Place	Team	Points	First place votes
1.	Arizona	406	(18)
2.	California	378	(9)
3.	Utah	360	(7)
4.	Oregon	338	(1)
5.	UCLA	304	(1)
6.	Oregon State	235	---
7.	Colorado	188	---
8.	Arizona State	165	---
9.	Stanford	145	---
10.	USC	111	---
11.	Washington	96	---
12.	Washington State	65	---

() first place votes

=== Recruiting classes ===
Pac-12 recruits at the 2015 McDonald's All-American Boys Game

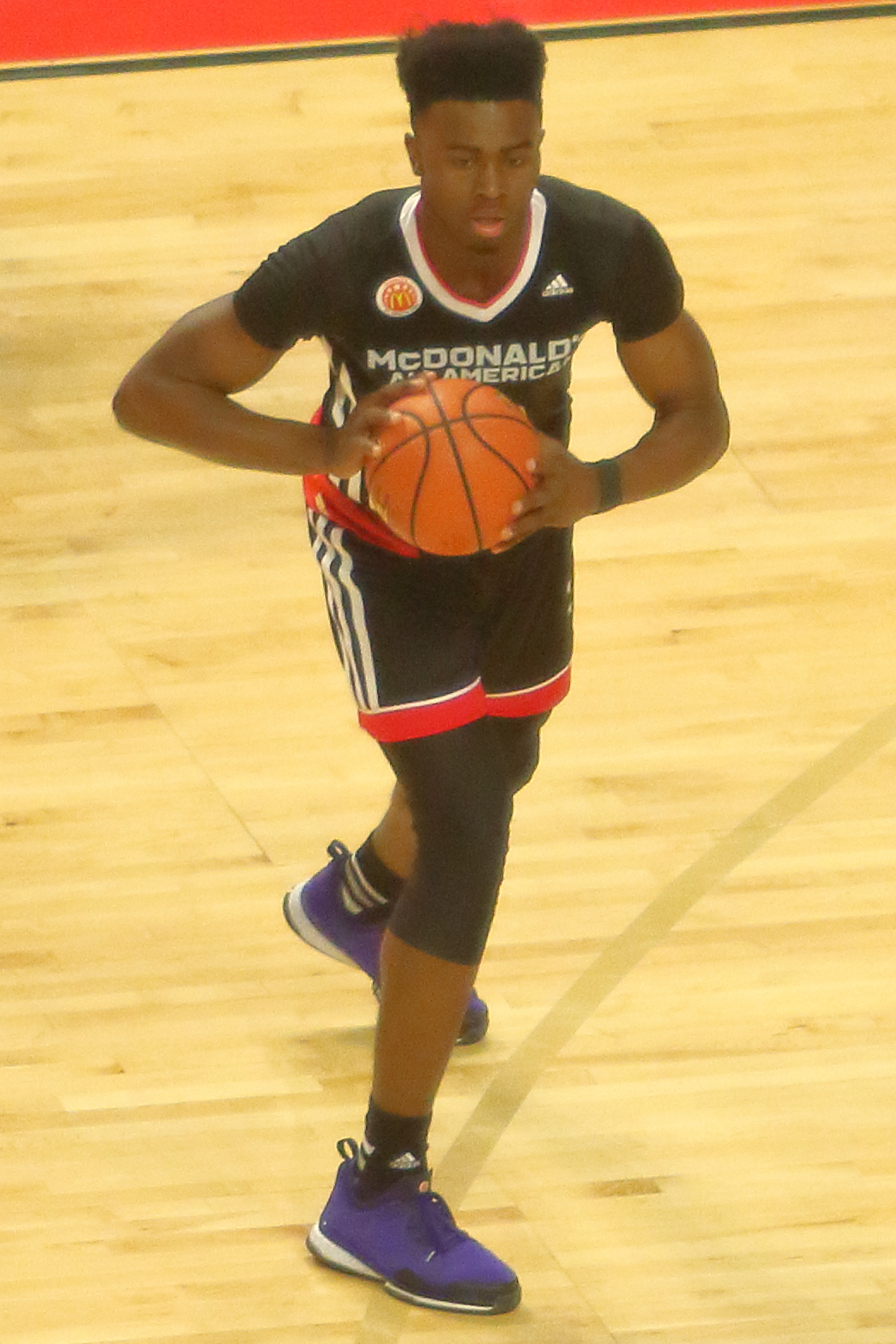
Jaylen Brown, Cal

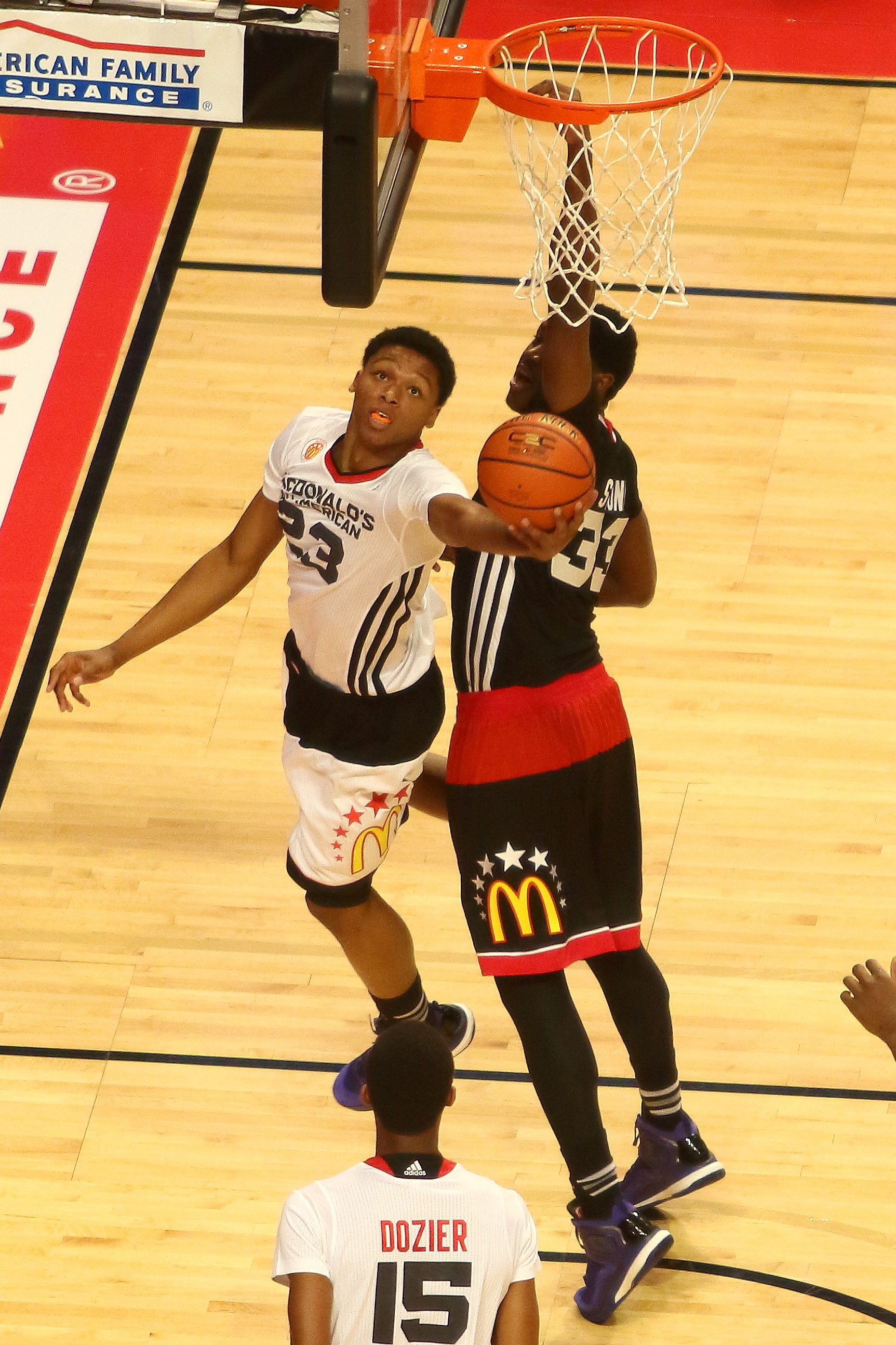
Ivan Rabb, Cal

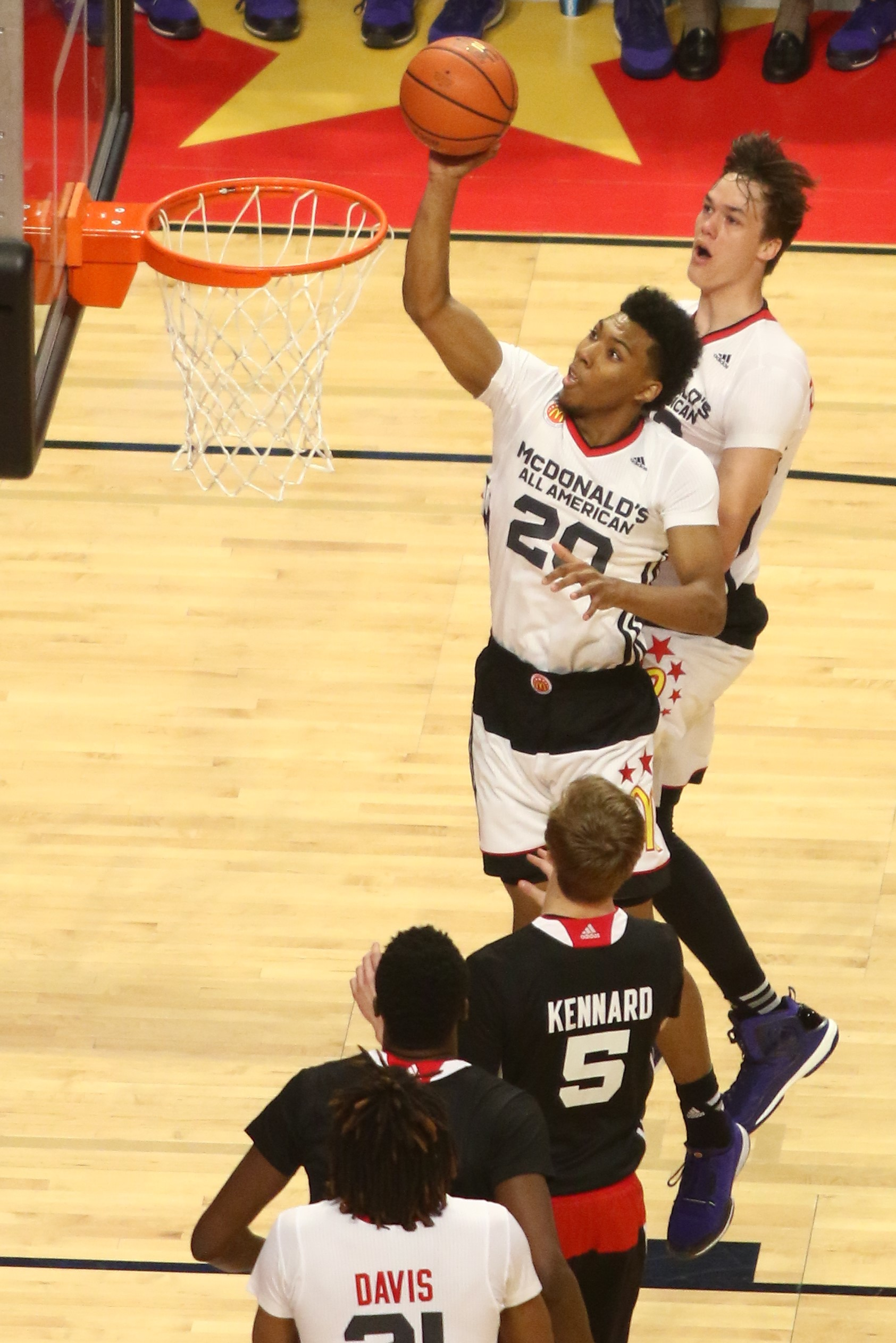
Allonzo Trier, Arizona

Rankings
Team	ESPN	Rivals	Scout	247 Sports	Signees
Arizona	#4	#3	#4	#4	4
Arizona State	-	-	-	-	2
California	#5	#7	#3	#7	4
Colorado	-	-	-	-	2
Oregon	#22	#15	-	#22	4
Oregon State	#19	#23	#24	#23	6
Stanford	-	#29	-	-	3
UCLA	#25	#24	#17	#21	4
USC	#30	#30	#22	#28	2
Utah	-	-	-	-	2
Washington	#12	#10	#6	#16	8
Washington State	-	-	-	-	4

== Rankings ==
The Pac-12 had 4 teams ranked and 3 others receiving votes in the preseason Coaches' Poll. It had four teams ranked in the preseason AP Poll and one other receiving votes.

Legend
	Improvement in ranking
	Drop in ranking
RV	Received votes but were not ranked in Top 25
	No votes received

		Pre	Wk 2	Wk 3	Wk 4	Wk 5	Wk 6	Wk 7	Wk 8	Wk 9	Wk 10	Wk 11	Wk 12	Wk 13	Wk 14	Wk 15	Wk 16	Wk 17	Wk 18	Wk 19	Final
Arizona	AP	12	12	11	19	13	13	8	8	6	18	12	18	23	17	12	9	18	15	16	–
Arizona	C	10	10	10	14	12	12	8	7	7	16	11	15	20	14	12	10	16	14	17	22
Arizona State	AP	NV	NV	NV	NV	NV	NV	NV	NV	NV	NV	NV	NV	NV	NV	NV	NV	NV	NV	NV	–
Arizona State	C	NV	NV	NV	NV	NV	NV	NV	NV	NV	NV	NV	NV	NV	NV	NV	NV	NV	NV	NV	NV
California	AP	14	15	14	RV	NV	NV	NV	NV	RV	NV	NV	NV	NV	NV	RV	RV	25	24	23	–
California	C	14	14	13	RV	RV	RV	RV	RV	RV	RV	RV	RV	RV	RV	RV	RV	25	24	23	RV
Colorado	AP	NV	NV	NV	NV	NV	RV	RV	RV	RV	NV	NV	RV	NV	NV	NV	NV	NV	NV	NV	–
Colorado	C	NV	NV	NV	NV	NV	RV	RV	RV	RV	NV	NV	NV	NV	NV	NV	NV	RV	NV	NV	NV
Oregon	AP	RV	25	21	15	24	RV	RV	RV	RV	RV	RV	23	16	11	16	13	9	8	5	–
Oregon	C	RV	RV	23	16	23	RV	RV	RV	RV	RV	RV	24	17	12	17	13	10	9	4	6
Oregon State	AP	NV	NV	NV	NV	NV	NV	NV	NV	NV	RV	NV	NV	NV	NV	NV	NV	NV	NV	NV	–
Oregon State	C	NV	NV	NV	NV	NV	NV	NV	NV	RV	NV	NV	NV	NV	NV	NV	NV	NV	NV	NV	NV
Stanford	AP	NV	NV	NV	NV	NV	NV	NV	NV	NV	NV	NV	NV	NV	NV	NV	NV	NV	NV	NV	–
Stanford	C	NV	NV	NV	NV	NV	NV	NV	NV	NV	NV	NV	NV	NV	NV	NV	NV	NV	NV	NV	NV
UCLA	AP	RV	NV	NV	NV	RV	22	RV	25	NV	RV	NV	NV	NV	NV	NV	NV	NV	NV	NV	–
UCLA	C	RV	NV	NV	NV	RV	RV	RV	RV	NV	RV	NV	NV	NV	NV	NV	NV	NV	NV	NV	NV
USC	AP	NV	NV	NV	NV	NV	NV	NV	NV	NV	RV	21	RV	RV	23	RV	RV	NV	NV	NV	–
USC	C	NV	NV	NV	NV	NV	NV	NV	NV	RV	RV	25	RV	RV	23	RV	RV	NV	NV	NV	NV
Utah	AP	16	16	RV	RV	25	RV	24	21	RV	RV	RV	RV	RV	RV	RV	22	13	12	13	–
Utah	C	16	16	RV	RV	24	RV	RV	22	RV	RV		RV	RV	RV	RV	23	13	12	14	20
Washington	AP	NV	RV	RV	NV	NV	NV	NV	NV	NV	NV	NV	NV	NV	RV	NV	NV	NV	NV	NV	–
Washington	C	NV	RV	RV	NV	NV	NV	NV	NV	NV	RV	RV	RV	RV	NV	NV	NV	NV	NV	NV	NV
Washington State	AP	NV	NV	NV	NV	NV	NV	NV	NV	NV	NV	NV	NV	NV	NV	NV	NV	NV	NV	NV	–
Washington State	C	NV	NV	NV	NV	NV	NV	NV	NV	NV	NV	NV	NV	NV	NV	NV	NV	NV	NV	NV	NV

== Pac-12 regular season ==
=== Conference Schedule ===
This table summarizes the head-to-head results between teams in conference play.

	Arizona	Arizona St	California	Colorado	Oregon	Oregon St	Stanford	UCLA	USC	Utah	Washington	Washington St
vs. Arizona	–	0–2	1–1	1–0	1–0	0–1	0–2	1–1	1–1	1–0	0–2	0–2
vs. Arizona State	2–0	–	2–0	1–0	1–0	0–1	1–1	2–0	1–1	1–0	2–0	0–2
vs. California	1–1	0–2	–	1–1	1–1	1–1	1–1	0–1	0–0	0–1	0–0	0–1
vs. Colorado	0–1	0–1	1–1	–	1–1	1–1	0–2	1–0	0–0	0–0	0–0	0–2
vs. Oregon	0–1	0–1	1–1	1–1	–	1–1	1–1	0–2	0–2	0–2	0–1	0–1
vs. Oregon State	1–0	1–0	1–1	1–1	1–1	–	1–1	1–1	0–0	0–0	0–0	0–0
vs. Stanford	2–0	1–1	1–1	2–0	1–1	1–1	–	0–1	0–0	0–1	0–0	0–1
vs. UCLA	1–1	0–2	1–0	0–1	2–0	1–1	1–0	–	0–0	0–0	1–0	1–1
vs. USC	1–1	1–1	1–0	0–1	2–0	1–1	1–0	0–2	–	0–0	1–0	0–2
vs. Utah	0–1	0–1	1–1	0–2	2–0	1–1	1–1	0–1	0–0	–	0–0	0–2
vs. Washington	2–0	0–2	1–0	1–1	1–0	1–0	0–1	0–2	0–1	0–0	–	0–1
vs. Washington State	2–0	2–0	1–0	2–0	1–0	1–0	1–0	1–1	1–0	0–0	0–0	–
Total	12–6	5–13	12–6	10–8	14–4	9–9	8–10	6–12	2–1	0–2	2–0	1–15

== Head coaches ==
Note: Stats shown are before the beginning of the season. Overall and Pac-12 records are from time at current school.

Team	Head coach	Previous job	Seasons at school	Overall record	Pac-12 record	NCAA Tournaments	NCAA Final Fours	NCAA Championships
Arizona	Sean Miller	Xavier	8th	188–61 (.755)	91–35 (.722)	9	0	0
Arizona State	Bobby Hurley	Buffalo	2nd	15–17 (.469)	5–13 (.278)	1	0	0
California	Cuonzo Martin	Tennessee	3rd	41–25 (.621)	19–17 (.528)	2	0	0
Colorado	Tad Boyle	Northern Colorado	7th	130–79 (.622)	56–50 (.528)	4	0	0
Oregon	Dana Altman	Creighton	7th	154–64 (.706)	69–39 (.639)	11	0	0
Oregon State	Wayne Tinkle	Montana	3rd	36–27 (.571)	17–19 (.472)	4	0	0
Stanford	Johnny Dawkins	Duke (associate HC)	8th	156–115 (.576)	66–78 (.458)	0	0	0
UCLA	Steve Alford	New Mexico	4th	64–37 (.634)	28–22 (.560)	9	0	0
USC	Andy Enfield	Florida Gulf Coast	4th	44–54 (.449)	13–36 (.265)	2	0	0
Utah	Larry Krystkowiak	New Jersey Nets (assistant)	6th	95–73 (.565)	42–47 (.472)	4	0	0
Washington	Lorenzo Romar	Saint Louis	15th	288–171 (.627)	141–111 (.560)	7	0	0
Washington State	Ernie Kent	Oregon	3rd	22–30 (.423)	8–28 (.222)	6	0	0

== Postseason ==
=== Pac-12 tournament ===
The conference tournament is scheduled for Wednesday–Saturday March, 9-12, 2016 at the MGM Grand Garden Arena located in Paradise, Nevada. The top four teams had a bye on the first day, March 9, 2016. Teams were seeded by conference record, with ties broken by record between the tied teams followed by record against the regular-season champion, if necessary.

First round Wednesday March 9
8	Washington	91
9	Stanford	68
5	Colorado	80
12	Washington State	56
7	USC	95
10	UCLA	71
6	Oregon State	75
11	Arizona State	66

Quarterfinals; Thursday March 10
1	Oregon	83
8	Washington	77
4	Arizona	82
5	Colorado	78
2	Utah	80
7	USC	72
3	California	76
6	Oregon State	68

Semifinals; Friday March 11
1	Oregon	95*
4	Arizona	89
2	Utah	82*
3	California	78

Championship; Saturday March 12
1	Oregon	88
2	Utah	57

* denotes each overtime period played

=== NCAA tournament ===
Seed	Region	School	First Round	Second Round	Sweet 16	Elite Eight	Final Four	Championship
1	West	Oregon	#16 Holy Cross, W 91–52	#8 Saint Joseph's, W 69–64	#4 Duke, W 82–68	#2 Oklahoma, L 68–80		
3	Midwest	Utah	#14 Fresno State, W 80–69	#11 Gonzaga, L 59–82				
4	South	California	#13 Hawaii, L 66–77					
6	South	Arizona	#11 Wichita State, L 55–65					
7	West	Oregon State	#10 VCU, L 67–75					
8	South	Colorado	#9 Connecticut, L 67–74					
8	East	USC	#9 Providence, L 69–70					
	7 Bids	W-L (%):	2–5 .286	1–1 .500	1–0 1.000	0–1 .000	0–0 –	TOTAL: 4–7 .364

=== National Invitation tournament ===
Seed	Bracket	School	First Round	Second Round	Quarterfinals	Semifinals	Finals
3	South Carolina	Washington	vs. Long Beach State, W 107–102	at San Diego State, L 78–93			
	1 Bid	W-L (%):	1–0 1.000	0–1 .000	0–0 –	0–0 –	TOTAL: 1–1 .500

Index to colors and formatting
Pac-12 member won
Pac-12 member lost

== Awards and honors ==
=== All-Pac-12 Tournament Teams ===
First Team Second Team

=== Player of the Week ===
- Nov. 16: Tyrone Wallace, Sr., California
- Nov. 23: Jakob Poeltl, So., Utah
- Nov. 30: Andrew Andrews, Sr., Washington
- Dec. 7: Thomas Welsh, So., UCLA
- Dec. 14: Allonzo Trier, Fr., Arizona
- Dec. 21: Jakob Poeltl, So., Utah (2)
- Dec. 28: Josh Hawkinson, Jr., Washington State
- Jan. 4: Andrew Andrews, Sr., Washington (2)
- Jan. 11: Bryce Alford, Jr., UCLA
- Jan. 18: Josh Scott, Sr., Colorado
- Jan. 25: Jakob Poeltl, So., Utah (3)
- Feb. 1: Dillon Brooks, So., Oregon
- Feb. 8: Ryan Anderson, RS Sr., Arizona
- Feb. 15: Jabari Bird, Jr., California
- Feb. 22: Jakob Poeltl, So., Utah (4)
- Feb. 29: Josh Scott, Sr., Colorado (2)
- Mar. 7: Gabe York, Sr., Arizona

=== All-Americans ===
AP

First Team Second Team

- Jakob Pöltl (Utah)
USBWA

First Team Second Team

- Jakob Pöltl (Utah)

District VIII: Player of the Year

- Jakob Pöltl (Utah)

District VIII: Coach of the Year

- Larry Krystkowiak (Utah)

District VIII: All-District Team

- Jordan Loveridge (Utah)
- Jakob Pöltl (Utah)
- Josh Scott (Colorado)

District VIII: Player of the Year

- Dillon Brooks (Oregon)

District VIII: Coach of the Year

- Dana Altman (Oregon)

District IX: All-District Team

- Ryan Anderson (Arizona)
- Andrew Andrews (Washington)
- Dillon Brooks (Oregon)
- Jaylen Brown (California)
- Gary Payton II (Oregon State)
- Ivan Rabb (California)
NABC

First Team Second Team

- Jakob Pöltl (Utah)
Sporting News

First Team

- Jakob Pöltl (Utah)

Second Team

Third Team

- Dillon Brooks (Oregon)

=== Conference awards ===
Voting was by conference coaches.

==== Individual awards ====
Pac-12 individual awards
Award	Recipient(s)
Player of The Year	Jakob Pöltl, So., Utah
Coach of the Year	Dana Altman, Oregon
Defensive Player of The Year	Gary Payton II, Sr., Oregon State
Freshman of The Year	Jaylen Brown, Fr., California
Scholar-Athlete of the Year	Brandon Taylor, Sr., Utah
Most Improved Player of The Year	George King, So., Colorado

==== All-Pac-12 ====
First team

Name	School	Pos.	Yr.	Ht., Wt.	Hometown (Last School)
Rosco Allen	Stanford	F	Sr.	6-9, 220	Duapest, Hungary (Bishop Gorman HS)
Ryan Anderson	Arizona	F	Sr.	6-9, 235	Long Beach, California (Boston College)
Andrew Andrews	Washington	G	Sr.	6-2, 200	Portland, Ore. (Benson Tech HS)
Dillon Brooks	Oregon	F	So.	6-7, 225	Mississauga, Ont. (Findlay Prep)
Jaylen Brown	California	F	Fr.	6-7, 225	Atlanta, Ga. (Wheeler HS)
Elgin Cook	Oregon	F	Sr.	6-6, 205	Milwaukee, Wis. (Northwest Florida State)
Julian Jacobs	USC	G	Jr.	6-4, 180	Las Vegas, Nev. (Desert Pines HS)
Gary Payton II	Oregon State	G	Sr.	6-3, 190	Seattle (Salt Lake CC)
Jakob Poeltl	Utah	F	So.	7-0, 248	Vienna, Austria (Arkadia Traiskirchen)
Josh Scott	Colorado	F	Sr.	6-10, 245	Monument, Colorado (Lewis-Palmer HS)

Second team

Name	School	Pos.	Yr.	Ht., Wt.
Isaac Hamilton	UCLA	G	Jr.	6-5, 185
Dejounte Murray	Washington	G	Fr.	6-4, 170
Ivan Rabb	California	F	Fr.	6-11, 220
Kaleb Tarczewski	Arizona	C	Sr.	7-0, 250
Gabe York	Arizona	G	Sr.	6-3, 190

==== All-Freshman Team ====
Name	School	Pos.	Ht., Wt.
Jaylen Brown	California	F	6-7, 225
Tyler Dorsey	Oregon	G	6-4, 180
Dejounte Murray	Washington	G	6-4, 170
Ivan Rabb	California	F	6-11, 220
Allonzo Trier	Arizona	G	6-6, 210

==== All-Defensive Team ====
Name	School	Pos.	Yr.	Ht., Wt.
Chris Boucher	Oregon	F	Sr.	6-10, 190
Gary Payton II	Oregon State	G	Sr.	6-3, 190
Josh Scott	Colorado	F	Sr.	6-10, 245
Brandon Taylor	Utah	G	Sr.	5-10, 170
Kaleb Tarczewski	Arizona	C	Sr.	7-0, 250

== NBA draft ==
Round	Pick	Player	Position	Nationality	Team	School/club team
1	3	Jaylen Brown	SF	United States	Boston Celtics (from Brooklyn)	California (Fr.)
1	8	Marquese Chriss	PF	United States	Sacramento Kings (traded to Phoenix Suns)	Washington (Fr.)
1	9	Jakob Pöltl	C	Austria	Toronto Raptors (from Denver via New York)	Utah (So.)
1	29	Dejounte Murray	PG/SG	United States	San Antonio Spurs	Washington (Fr.)
2	60	Tyrone Wallace	PG	United States	Utah Jazz (from Golden State)	California (Sr.)
