= 2014–15 UCLA Bruins men's basketball team =

American college basketball season

2014–15 UCLA Bruins men's basketball

NCAA tournament, Sweet Sixteen
- Conference: Pac-12 Conference
- Record: 22–14 (11–7 Pac-12)
- Head coach: Steve Alford (2nd season)
- Assistant coaches: Ed Schilling; Duane Broussard; David Grace
- Home arena: Pauley Pavilion

2014–15 Pac-12 Conference men's basketball standings
	Conf.				Overall
Team	W		L	PCT	W		L	PCT
No. 5 Arizona †	16	–	2	.889	34	–	4	.895
No. 25 Oregon	13	–	5	.722	26	–	10	.722
No. 19 Utah	13	–	5	.722	26	–	9	.743
UCLA	11	–	7	.611	22	–	14	.611
Stanford	9	–	9	.500	24	–	13	.649
Arizona State	9	–	9	.500	18	–	16	.529
Oregon State	8	–	10	.444	17	–	14	.548
California	7	–	11	.389	18	–	15	.545
Colorado	7	–	11	.389	16	–	18	.471
Washington State	7	–	11	.389	13	–	18	.419
Washington	5	–	13	.278	16	–	15	.516
USC	3	–	15	.167	12	–	20	.375
† Pac-12 Tournament winner Rankings from AP poll

The 2014–15 UCLA Bruins men's basketball team represented the University of California, Los Angeles during the 2014–15 NCAA Division I men's basketball season. The Bruins were led by second-year head coach Steve Alford and played their home games at Pauley Pavilion as members in the Pac-12 Conference. The team featured two All-Pac-12 performers in Norman Powell and Kevon Looney. Although the freshman Looney was seen as a potential NBA lottery pick, the senior Powell became the Bruins' most consistent performer. After numerous non-conference losses to start the season, UCLA finished in fourth place (11–7) in the Pac-12. They earned a No. 11 seed in the NCAA tournament, and advanced to the Sweet 16, becoming the lowest-seed UCLA team to ever reach the regional semifinals. The program produced its 49th 20-win season.

The Bruins began the season 4–0 and ranked No. 22 before losing two of three games at the Battle 4 Atlantis tournament. According to some pundits, the Bruins had the toughest non-conference schedule in the Pac-12. However, it did not net any signature wins, losing to ranked North Carolina, Gonzaga, and Kentucky. Beginning with their December loss at home to Gonzaga, the Bruins lost five consecutive games, their longest streak since 2009–10. Losses included a 39-point defeat to No. 1 Kentucky—they fell behind 24–0 and trailed 41–7 at halftime—and by 32 points against Utah. After Gonzaga, UCLA went 25 days without a home game, the longest in the school's history since 1972–73. They recovered to win eight of their next 11. After getting swept in a road trip to Arizona, UCLA closed out the regular season with three straight home wins to finish undefeated (9–0) at home in the conference for the first time since 2006–07. However, UCLA had few wins against notable teams during the season, and experts widely predicted that they needed a strong performance in the Pac-12 tournament to qualify for the NCAA tournament. The Bruins went 1–1, and were eliminated by Arizona. Although they were 0–2 for the season against the Wildcats, both games were competitive until the end.

Proving most major projections wrong, UCLA received an invite to the NCAA tournament, earning a No. 11 seed. Selection committee chairman Scott Barnes cited the Bruins' strength of schedule and improved play, even in their tournament loss to Arizona, as factors in their inclusion. In the Bruins' opener, Bryce Alford was credited with the game-winning three-point field goal after a goaltending call with 13 seconds remaining in a 60–59 win over sixth-seeded SMU. He finished with a game-high 27 points and made 9 of 11 three-point attempts. They advanced to the Sweet 16, where they lost again to Gonzaga, 74–62.

== Previous season ==
The UCLA Bruins finished the season with a record of 28–9 after advancing to the 2014 NCAA Division I men's basketball tournament. At the Pac-12 Conference tournament, the Bruins defeated the Arizona Wildcats 75–71 for the tournament championship. Kyle Anderson was voted the tournament's Most Outstanding Player after scoring 21 points and grabbing 15 rebounds in the championship game. The Bruins advanced to the Sweet 16 of the 2014 NCAA tournament—their first regional semifinal appearance since 2008—before falling to Florida, who improved to 4–0 all-time against UCLA in the NCAA tournament.

== Offseason ==
=== Departures ===
Name	Number	Pos.	Height	Weight	Year	Hometown	Notes
David Wear	12	F	6'10"	230	RS Senior	Huntington Beach, California	Graduated
Travis Wear	24	F	6'10"	230	RS Senior	Huntington Beach, California	Graduated
Sooren Derboghosian	10	C	6'10"	240	Senior	Tehran, Iran	Walk-on; Transferred to Drexel.
Aubrey Williams	30	PG	5'8"	175	Senior	Palmdale, California	Walk-on; Graduated
Jordan Adams	3	SG	6'5"	220	Sophomore	Lawrenceville, Georgia	Declared for 2014 NBA draft.
Kyle Anderson	5	G/F	6'9"	230	Sophomore	Fairview, New Jersey	Declared for 2014 NBA Draft.
Zach LaVine	14	G	6'5"	180	Freshman	Bothell, Washington	Declared for 2014 NBA Draft.

=== 2014 recruiting class ===
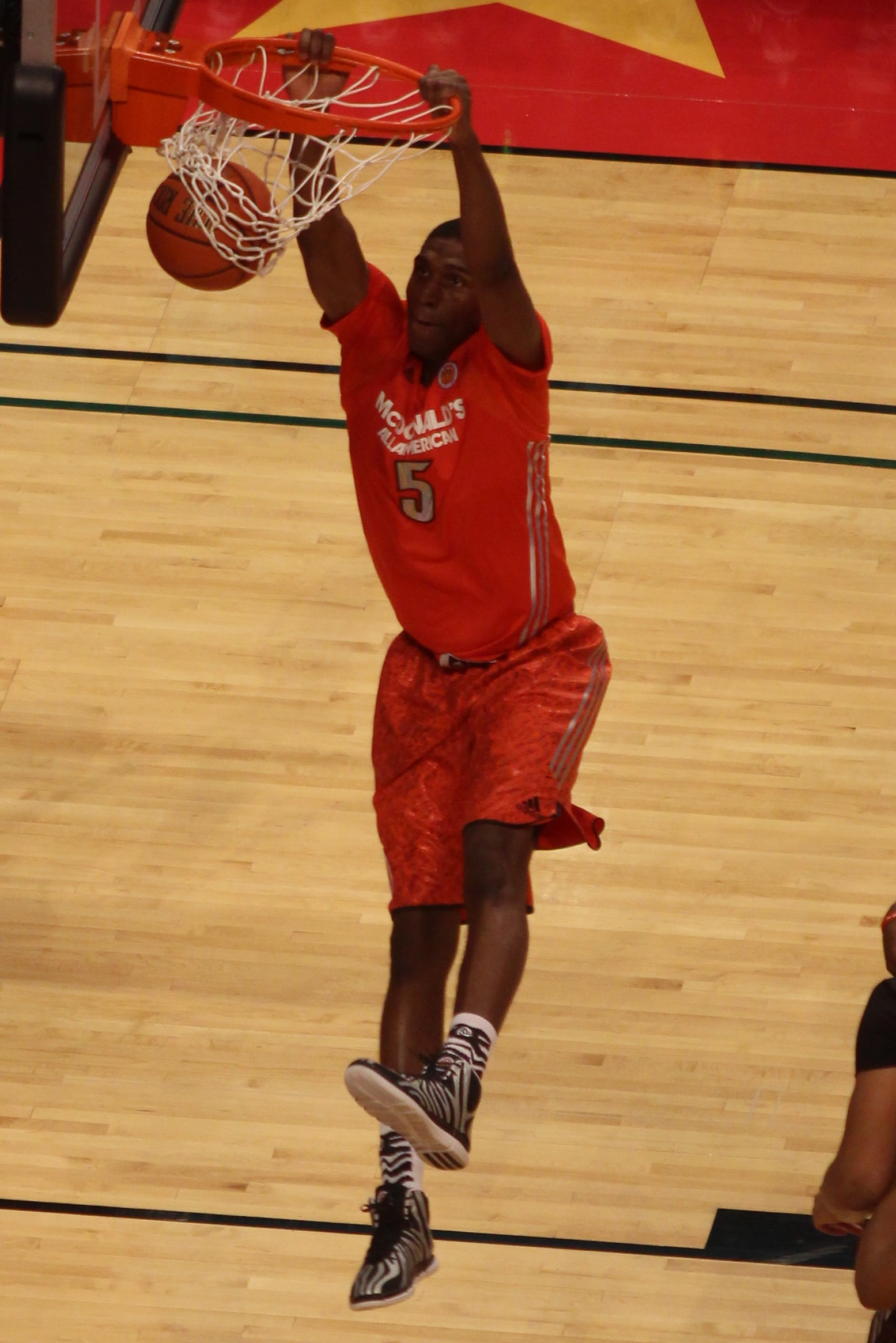
Incoming freshman Kevon Looney at the 2014 McDonald's All-American Game

College recruiting information
Name	Hometown	School	Height	Weight	Commit date
György Golomán; C	Weston, FL	The Sagemont School	6 ft 10 in (2.08 m)	205 lb (93 kg)	Oct 28, 2013
György Golomán; C	Recruit ratings: Scout: Rivals: 247Sports: ESPN:				
Kevon Looney; PF	Milwaukee, WI	Hamilton High School	6 ft 9 in (2.06 m)	210 lb (95 kg)	Oct 31, 2013
Kevon Looney; PF	Recruit ratings: Scout: Rivals: 247Sports: ESPN:				
Thomas Welsh; C	Los Angeles, CA	Loyola High School	7 ft 0 in (2.13 m)	240 lb (110 kg)	Nov 19, 2013
Thomas Welsh; C	Recruit ratings: Scout: Rivals: 247Sports: ESPN:				
Jonah Bolden; F	Sydney, AUS	Brewster Academy	6 ft 8 in (2.03 m)	205 lb (93 kg)	Dec 9, 2013
Jonah Bolden; F	Recruit ratings: Scout: Rivals: 247Sports: ESPN:				
Overall recruit ranking: Scout: 7 Rivals: 17 ESPN: 11
Note: In many cases, Scout, Rivals, 247Sports, On3, and ESPN may conflict in their listings of height and weight.; In these cases, the average was taken. ESPN grades are on a 100-point scale.; Sources: "UCLA Commit List for 2014". Rivals.; "2014 UCLA Basketball Commits". Scout.; "ESPN". ESPN.; "Scout.com Team Recruiting Rankings". Scout.; "2014 Team Ranking". Rivals.

== Roster ==
2014–15 UCLA Bruins men's basketball team
Players
Coaches

Pos.	#	Name	Height	Weight	Year	Previous school	Hometown
G	0	Nick Kazemi (W)	6 ft 3 in (1.91 m)	210 lb (95 kg)	RS Jr	Tustin H.S.	Santa Ana, California
F	1	Wanaah Bail	6 ft 9 in (2.06 m)	215 lb (98 kg)	So	Lamar Consolidated H.S.	Houston, Texas
G	2	Kory Alford (W)	6 ft 4 in (1.93 m)	185 lb (84 kg)	RS Jr	La Cueva H.S.	Albuquerque, New Mexico
G	4	Norman Powell	6 ft 4 in (1.93 m)	215 lb (98 kg)	Sr	Lincoln H.S.	San Diego, California
F	5	Kevon Looney	6 ft 9 in (2.06 m)	220 lb (100 kg)	Fr	Hamilton H.S.	Milwaukee, Wisconsin
G	10	Isaac Hamilton	6 ft 4 in (1.93 m)	185 lb (84 kg)	So	St. John Bosco H.S.	Los Angeles, California
G	13	David Brown (W)	6 ft 3 in (1.91 m)	185 lb (84 kg)	Sr	Mater Dei H.S.	Anaheim Hills, California
F	14	György Golomán	6 ft 10 in (2.08 m)	215 lb (98 kg)	Fr	The Sagemont School	Körmend, Hungary
G	15	Jerrold Smith (W)	6 ft 0 in (1.83 m)	170 lb (77 kg)	So	St. Bernard H.S	Los Angeles, California
G	20	Bryce Alford	6 ft 3 in (1.91 m)	180 lb (82 kg)	So	La Cueva H.S.	Albuquerque, New Mexico
G	21	Alec Wulff (W)	6 ft 3 in (1.91 m)	185 lb (84 kg)	Fr	Laguna Beach H.S.	Laguna Beach, California
G/F	22	Noah Allen	6 ft 6 in (1.98 m)	215 lb (98 kg)	So	Palma H.S.	Pacific Grove, California
F/C	23	Tony Parker	6 ft 9 in (2.06 m)	260 lb (118 kg)	Jr	Miller Grove H.S.	Atlanta, Georgia
C	40	Thomas Welsh	7 ft 0 in (2.13 m)	245 lb (111 kg)	Fr	Loyola H.S.	Redondo Beach, California
G/F	43	Jonah Bolden (I)	6 ft 10 in (2.08 m)	215 lb (98 kg)	Fr	Brewster Academy	Sydney, Australia

Head coach

- Steve Alford (Indiana)

Assistant coach(es)

- Ed Schilling (Miami (OH))
- Duane Broussard (Bradley)
- David Grace (Park)

Legend

- (C) Team captain
- (S) Suspended
- (I) Ineligible
- (W) Walk-on
- Injured
- Current redshirt

Roster
Last update: 02/18/2015

== Schedule ==
Date time, TV	Rank^{#}	Opponent^{#}	Result	Record	High points	High rebounds	High assists	Site (attendance) city, state
Exhibition
10/31/2014*; 7:30 pm		Azusa Pacific	W 80–53		21 – Norman Powell	12 – Kevon Looney	6 – Isaac Hamilton	Pauley Pavilion (5,655); Los Angeles, CA
Non-conference regular season
11/14/2014*; 9:00 pm, P12N		Montana State	W 113–78	1–0	25 – Norman Powell	9 – Kevon Looney	12 – Bryce Alford	Pauley Pavilion (6,523); Los Angeles, CA
11/16/2014*; 7:00 pm, P12N		Coastal Carolina	W 84–71	2–0	17 – B. Alford/K. Looney	14 – Kevon Looney	7 – Bryce Alford	Pauley Pavilion (5,389); Los Angeles, CA
11/20/2014*; 8:00 pm, P12N		Nicholls State	W 107–74	3–0	28 – Bryce Alford	14 – Kevon Looney	13 – Bryce Alford	Pauley Pavilion (5,231); Los Angeles, CA
11/23/2014*; 7:00 pm, P12N		Long Beach State	W 77–63	4–0	24 – Norman Powell	11 – Kevon Looney	7 – Bryce Alford	Pauley Pavilion (8,639); Los Angeles, CA
11/26/2014*; 11:30 am, ESPN2	No. 22	vs. Oklahoma; Battle 4 Atlantis First Round	L 65–75	4–1	19 – Bryce Alford	15 – Kevon Looney	4 – Norman Powell	Imperial Arena (2,174); Nassau, BHS
11/27/2014*; 4:00 pm, AXS TV	No. 22	vs. No. 5 North Carolina; Battle 4 Atlantis Consolation 2nd Round	L 56–78	4–2	15 – Norman Powell	8 – Thomas Welsh	3 – Bryce Alford	Imperial Arena (2,940); Nassau, BHS
11/28/2014*; 7:30 pm, AXS TV	No. 22	vs. UAB; Battle 4 Atlantis 7th place game	W 88–76	5–2	21 – Issac Hamilton	8 – K. Looney/T. Parker	6 – Bryce Alford	Imperial Arena (517); Nassau, BHS
12/03/2014*; 9:00 pm, P12N		Cal State Fullerton	W 73–45	6–2	18 – Norman Powell	13 – Kevon Looney	7 – Bryce Alford	Pauley Pavilion (4,897); Los Angeles, CA
12/07/2014*; 4:00 pm, P12N		San Diego	W 75–68	7–2	22 – Bryce Alford	11 – Kevon Looney	6 – Bryce Alford	Pauley Pavilion (6,389); Los Angeles, CA
12/10/2014*; 8:00 pm, P12N		UC Riverside	W 77–66	8–2	20 – Norman Powell	16 – Tony Parker	8 – Bryce Alford	Pauley Pavilion (5,450); Los Angeles, CA
12/13/2014*; 7:00 pm, ESPN2		No. 9 Gonzaga	L 74–87	8–3	23 – Bryce Alford	9 – Tony Parker	3 – Bryce Alford	Pauley Pavilion (10,006); Los Angeles, CA
12/20/2014*; 12:30 pm, CBS		vs. No. 1 Kentucky; CBS Sports Classic	L 44–83	8–4	14 – Isaac Hamilton	9 – Kevon Looney	3 – I. Hamilton/N. Powell	United Center (19,726); Chicago, IL
12/28/2014*; 3:30 pm, ESPNU		at Alabama	L 50–56	8–5	16 – Bryce Alford	6 – 3 tied	4 – Bryce Alford	Coleman Coliseum (13,472); Tuscaloosa, AL
Pac-12 regular season
01/02/2015; 7:00 pm, FS1		at Colorado	L 56–62	8–6 (0–1)	22 – Norman Powell	9 – Thomas Welsh	4 – Bryce Alford	Coors Events Center (10,191); Boulder, CO
01/04/2015; 1:00 pm, P12N		at No. 10 Utah	L 39–71	8–7 (0–2)	12 – Tony Parker	6 – Kevon Looney	5 – Bryce Alford	Jon M. Huntsman Center (10,566); Salt Lake City, UT
01/08/2015; 6:00 pm, ESPN		Stanford	W 86–81 ^{2OT}	9–7 (1–2)	27 – Kevon Looney	19 – Kevon Looney	5 – Isaac Hamilton	Pauley Pavilion (7,379); Los Angeles, CA
01/11/2015; 4:30 pm, FS1		California	W 73–54	10–7 (2–2)	15 – Kevon Looney	8 – Tony Parker	9 – Bryce Alford	Pauley Pavilion (11,093); Los Angeles, CA
01/14/2015; 6:00 pm, ESPN2		at USC; Rivalry	W 83–66	11–7 (3–2)	22 – Norman Powell	10 – Kevon Looney	4 – Norman Powell	Galen Center (6,253); Los Angeles, CA
01/22/2015; 6:00 pm, P12N		at Oregon State	L 55–66	11–8 (3–3)	18 – Bryce Alford	11 – Kevon Looney	6 – Bryce Alford	Gill Coliseum (6,024); Corvallis, OR
01/24/2015; 1:00 pm, CBS		at Oregon	L 64–82	11–9 (3–4)	23 – Norman Powell	8 – Kevon Looney	3 – Noah Allen	Matthew Knight Arena (7,301); Eugene, OR
01/29/2015; 7:00 pm, ESPN2		No. 11 Utah	W 69–59	12–9 (4–4)	23 – Norman Powell	6 – K. Looney/T. Parker	7 – Bryce Alford	Pauley Pavilion (7,008); Los Angeles, CA
01/31/2015; 7:30 pm, P12N		Colorado	W 72–59	13–9 (5–4)	22 – Norman Powell	10 – Kevon Looney	5 – Bryce Alford	Pauley Pavilion (9,057); Los Angeles, CA
02/05/2015; 6:00 pm, ESPN2		at Stanford	W 69–67	14–9 (6–4)	20 – Norman Powell	9 – Kevon Looney	4 – Isaac Hamilton	Maples Pavilion (5,298); Stanford, CA
02/07/2015; 5:00 pm, P12N		at California	L 62–64	14–10 (6–5)	20 – Tony Parker	11 – Kevon Looney	5 – Bryce Alford	Haas Pavilion (10,853); Berkeley, CA
02/11/2015; 7:00 pm, P12N		Oregon State	W 75–59	15–10 (7–5)	22 – Bryce Alford	10 – Tony Parker	9 – Isaac Hamilton	Pauley Pavilion (6,346); Los Angeles, CA
02/14/2015; 12:00 pm, FOX		Oregon	W 72–63	16–10 (8–5)	24 – Norman Powell	11 – Kevon Looney	7 – Isaac Hamilton	Pauley Pavilion (10,006); Los Angeles, CA
02/18/2015; 6:00 pm, ESPN2		at Arizona State	L 66–68	16–11 (8–6)	16 – Norman Powell	6 – Kevon Looney	4 – Bryce Alford	Wells Fargo Arena (7,873); Tempe, AZ
02/21/2015; 6:00 pm, ESPN		at No. 7 Arizona; Rivalry and ESPN College GameDay	L 47–57	16–12 (8–7)	22 – Bryce Alford	5 – Norman Powell	3 – Bryce Alford	McKale Center (14,655); Tucson, AZ
02/25/2015; 8:00 pm, ESPN2		Washington	W 88–66	17–12 (9–7)	24 – Norman Powell	7 – K. Looney/N. Powell	10 – Isaac Hamilton	Pauley Pavilion (7,841); Los Angeles, CA
03/01/2015; 6:30 pm, FS1		Washington State	W 72–67	18–12 (10–7)	28 – Norman Powell	10 – Tony Parker	6 – Isaac Hamilton	Pauley Pavilion (9,082); Los Angeles, CA
03/04/2015; 6:00 pm, ESPN2		USC; Rivalry	W 85–74	19–12 (11–7)	23 – Bryce Alford	13 – Kevon Looney	5 – Isaac Hamilton	Pauley Pavilion (10,734); Los Angeles, CA
Pac-12 Tournament
03/12/2015; 2:30 pm, P12N		vs. USC; Quarterfinals	W 96–70	20–12	36 – Isaac Hamilton	7 – B. Alford/G. Goloman	7 – Bryce Alford	MGM Grand Garden Arena (12,916); Paradise, NV
03/13/2015; 6:00 pm, P12N		vs. No. 5 Arizona; Semifinals	L 64–70	20–13	21 – Norman Powell	4 – 5 tied	2 – 3 tied	MGM Grand Garden Arena (12,916); Paradise, NV
NCAA tournament
03/19/2015*; 12:10 PM, truTV	No. (11 S)	vs. No. 18 (6 S) SMU; Second round	W 60–59	21–13	27 – Bryce Alford	10 – Kevon Looney	4 – B. Alford/I. Hamilton	KFC Yum! Center (21,285); Louisville, KY
03/21/2015*; 9:10 AM, CBS	No. (11 S)	vs. (14 S) UAB; Third round	W 92–75	22–13	28 – Tony Parker	12 – Tony Parker	7 – Isaac Hamilton	KFC Yum! Center (21,760); Louisville, KY
03/27/2015*; 4:15 PM, CBS	No. (11 S)	vs. No. 7 (2 S) Gonzaga; Sweet Sixteen	L 62–74	22–14	16 – T. Parker/N. Powell	11 – Parker	4 – B. Alford/I. Hamilton	NRG Stadium (21,168); Houston, TX
*Non-conference game. ^{#}Rankings from AP Poll. (#) Tournament seedings in parentheses. All times are in Pacific Time. (#) during NCAA Tournament is seed with Region S=South.

== Rankings ==
Legend: ██ Increase in ranking. ██ Decrease in ranking.
Poll	Pre	Wk 2	Wk 3	Wk 4	Wk 5	Wk 6	Wk 7	Wk 8	Wk 9	Wk 10	Wk 11	Wk 12	Wk 13	Wk 14	Wk 15	Wk 16	Wk 17	Wk 18	Wk 19	Final
AP	RV	RV	22	RV	NR	NR	NR	NR	NR	NR	NR	NR	NR	NR	NR	NR	NR	NR	NR	N/A
Coaches	RV	RV	23	RV	RV	NR	NR	NR	NR	NR	NR	NR	NR	NR	NR	NR	NR	NR	NR	RV

== Awards and honors ==
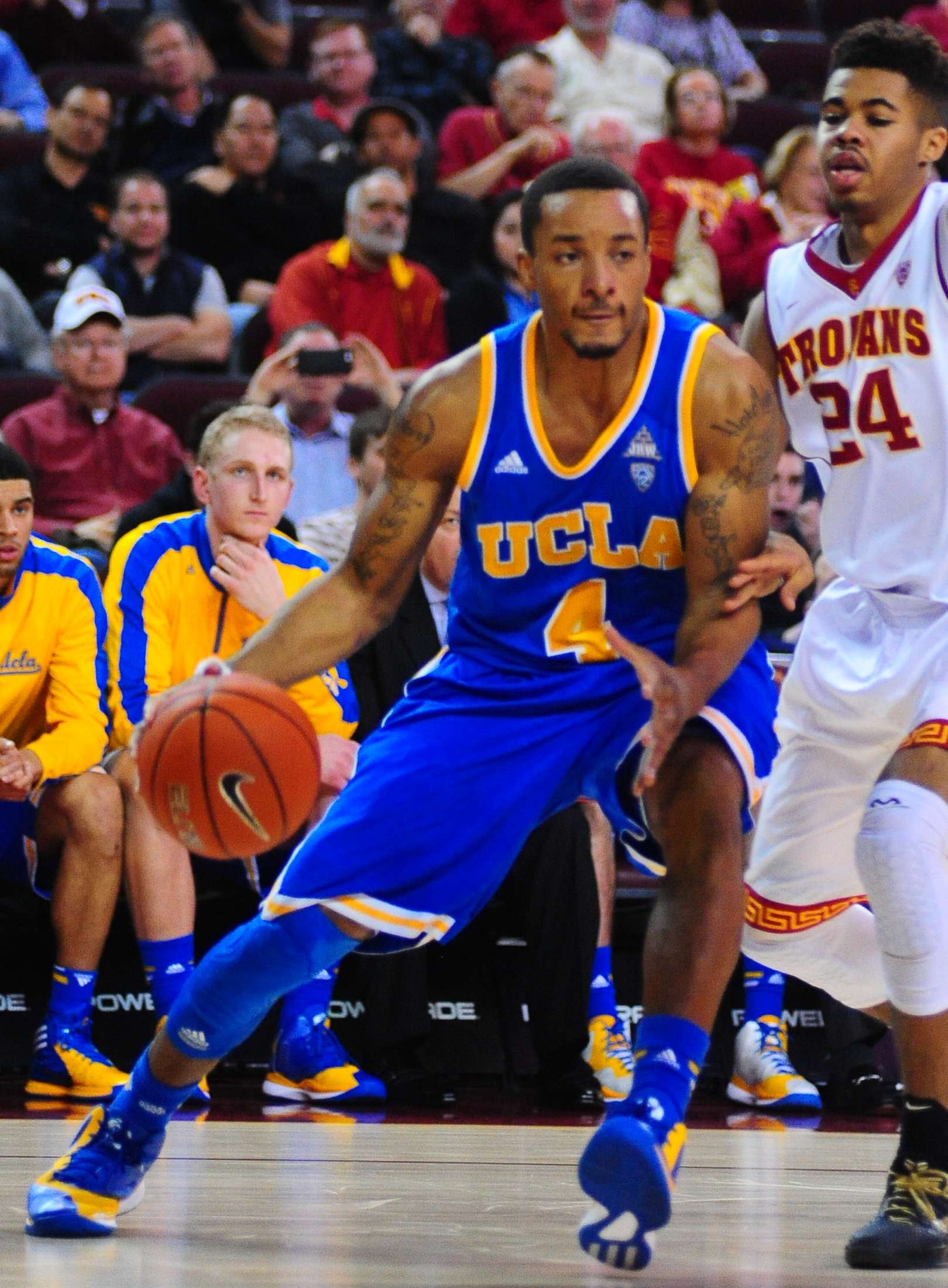
Norman Powell was Pac-12 Player of the Week three times

Pac-12 Conference Player of the Week

- November 24, 2014 – Norman Powell
- January 12, 2015 – Kevon Looney
- February 2, 2015 – Norman Powell
- March 2, 2015 – Norman Powell

All-Pac-12 Teams

- Norman Powell – First-team All-Pac-12, honorable mention All-Defensive Team
- Kevon Looney – Second-team All-Pac-12, Pac-12 All-Freshman Team
- Bryce Alford – Honorable mention All-Pac-12

USBWA All-District IX Team

- Norman Powell

NABC All-District 20 Team

- Norman Powell – Second-team
- Kevon Looney – Second-team

UCLA Team Awards

- Norman Powell – the Coach John R. Wooden Award as the team's Most Valuable Player
- Kevon Looney – the Gerald A. Finerman Award as the team's rebounding leader and the Seymour Armond Memorial Award as the most valuable freshman
- Bryce Alford – the UCLA Alumni Association Award as the team's leader in assists (4.9 apg)

== Notes ==
- January 14, 2015 – Norman Powell becomes the first since Toby Bailey to win four games in a row at USC.
- January 15, 2015 – Pac-12 Conference announced that Dave Meyers will be inducted into the Pac-12 Conference Men's Basketball Hall of Honor at the 2015 Pac-12 Basketball tournament.
- January 31, 2015 – 1964 and 1965 NCAA Championship teams were honored at halftime during the Colorado game.
- February 14, 2015 – The 1995 NCAA Championship team was honored at halftime. Former head coach Jim Harrick, players Ed O'Bannon, Charles O'Bannon, Toby Bailey, Tyus Edney and Kris Johnson attended the game.
- March 1, 2015 – The 1975 National Championship team celebrated its 40th anniversary at halftime .
- March 4, 2015 – Play-by-play announcer Chris Roberts broadcast his final game at Pauley Pavilion, retiring after 23 seasons; Four seniors—Powell, Kory Alford, David Brown, and Nick Kazemi—were honored before the game on Senior Day.
- March 10, 2015 – UCLA announced the construction of the Mo Ostin Basketball Center.
- April 6, 2015 – Kevon Looney foregoes his remaining collegiate eligibility and enters the 2015 NBA Draft.

== See also ==
- List of UCLA Bruins in the NBA
