= Jonah Bolden =

Australian-American basketball player (born 1996)

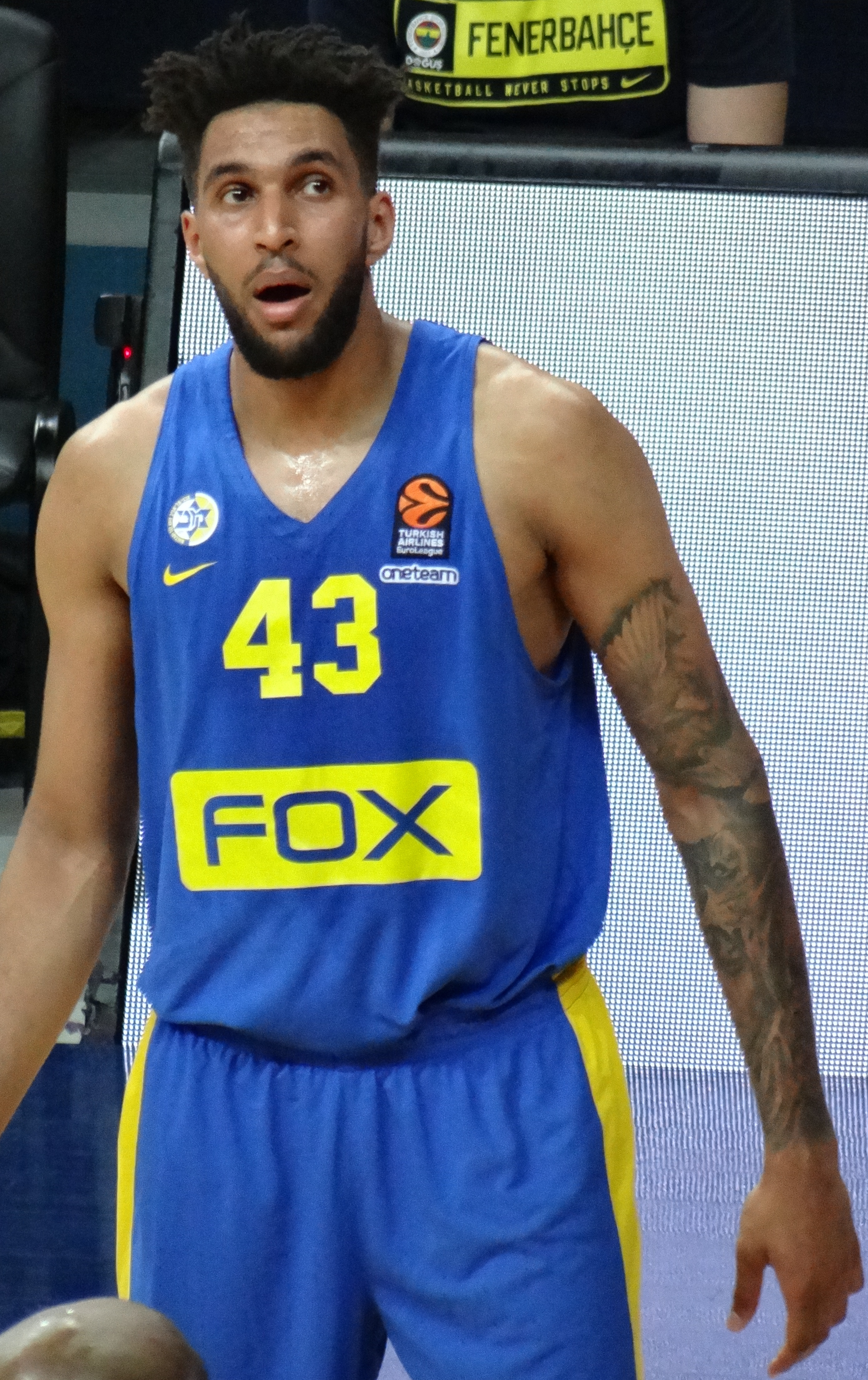
- Bolden with Maccabi Tel Aviv in 2018

No. 43 – Cairns Taipans
- Position: Power forward
- League: NBL

Personal information
- Born: 2 January 1996 (age 30) Melbourne, Victoria, Australia
- Listed height: 203 cm (6 ft 8 in)
- Listed weight: 106 kg (234 lb)

Career information
- High school: Homebush Boys (Sydney, New South Wales); Findlay Prep (Henderson, Nevada); Brewster Academy (Wolfeboro, New Hampshire)
- College: UCLA (2015–2016)
- NBA draft: 2017: 2nd round, 36th overall pick
- Drafted by: Philadelphia 76ers
- Playing career: 2016–2020, 2023–present

Career history
- 2016–2017: FMP
- 2017–2018: Maccabi Tel Aviv
- 2018–2020: Philadelphia 76ers
- 2018–2020: →Delaware Blue Coats
- 2020: Phoenix Suns
- 2023–2024: Sydney Kings
- 2024–2025: Capitanes de Arecibo
- 2024–2025: New Zealand Breakers
- 2025: Cangrejeros de Santurce
- 2025–2026: Illawarra Hawks
- 2026–present: Cairns Taipans

Career highlights
- Israeli League champion (2018); Israeli League Cup winner (2017); ABA League Top Prospect (2017)
- Stats at NBA.com
- Stats at Basketball Reference

Jonah Anthony Bolden (born 2 January 1996) is an Australian-American professional basketball player for the Cairns Taipans of the National Basketball League (NBL). He started his professional career with FMP in Serbia, where he was named the ABA League Top Prospect in 2017. He played a season-and-a-half in the National Basketball Association (NBA) with the Philadelphia 76ers before joining the Phoenix Suns.

Bolden is the son of an American former pro basketball player Bruce Bolden, and moved to the United States as a senior in high school. A highly ranked college recruit, he played college basketball for the UCLA Bruins. Bolden was ineligible to play with the Bruins in his freshman year in 2014–15 after the National Collegiate Athletic Association (NCAA) ruled him a partial qualifier due to his transferring as a high school senior. After playing with UCLA as a sophomore, Bolden left the school and played one season with FMP. He was selected by Philadelphia in the second round of the 2017 NBA draft with the 36th overall pick, but played one season with Maccabi Tel Aviv in Israel before joining the 76ers. He also played for the Australia national under-19 basketball team in the 2013 FIBA Under-19 World Championship.

== Early life ==
Bolden was born in Melbourne to an American father Bruce Bolden and Egyptian mother Marie Yacoub. His father played professional basketball, including 17 years in the National Basketball League in Australia. Jonah grew up in Sydney and began playing basketball for the Bankstown Bruins at five years of age. As a teenager, he attended Homebush Boys High School and was first selected to represent his home state of New South Wales at the 2013 Basketball Australia Under 18 National Championships. Bolden led the NSW Metro state team to the national final by averaging 18 ppg and 13 rpg throughout the competition and his outstanding performance in the national championships saw him selected as the youngest player to represent Australia at the 2013 FIBA Under-19 World Championship. In August 2013, he relocated to the United States to play as a senior at Findlay College Prep, a private preparatory school in Henderson, Nevada, near Las Vegas. However, his high school eligibility expired after his first semester and he transferred midseason to Brewster Academy in New Hampshire.

In December 2013, Bolden chose to play college basketball at UCLA over Louisville, Kentucky, Indiana, USC and SMU. A consensus four-star recruit, he was listed as the No. 25 player in his class by Scout.com, No. 32 by Rivals.com, and No. 69 by ESPN.com, while also being ranked as the No. 5 power forward by Scout.com.

== College career ==
Bolden was a redshirt in his freshman year at UCLA after he was ruled ineligible to play in 2014–15. Before the season, the NCAA declared him a partial qualifier, stemming from his transfer from Australia when his senior year in high school had already began. In January 2015, he was cleared by the NCAA to practice with the Bruins. In May, he underwent arthroscopic surgery for a torn meniscus in his right knee that was expected to sideline him for six to eight weeks.

A 6-foot-10-inch (2.08 m) guard capable of playing either forward position, Bolden entered 2015–16 as the Bruins' projected replacement for wing player Norman Powell and combo forward Kevon Looney, who both moved on to the NBA. However, his college debut was delayed after he violated unspecified team rules and was held out of UCLA's season opener, an 84–81 upset loss to Monmouth. He made his first appearance the following game, making an impact on defense while scoring 11 points and adding five rebounds in an 88–83 win over Cal Poly. On 12 December, Bolden played 30 minutes and had 10 points and 11 rebounds for his first career double-double in a 71–66 road win over No. 20 Gonzaga. UCLA coach Steve Alford inserted him into the game to guard a hot Kyle Wiltjer, who finished with 20 points but shot only 4 of 12 for the remainder of the game. Tony Parker had the initial defensive assignment, but Bolden provided more athleticism and mobility. In the following game against Louisiana–Lafayette, Bolden made his first career start when center Thomas Welsh was out sick, and the Bruins won 89–80. While he emerged as UCLA's top player off the bench, Bolden's impact on offense was minimal.

After UCLA struggled on defense while starting 3–5 in their Pac-12 Conference schedule, Alford believed their front court was "slow" and moved Bolden into the starting lineup at power forward in place of Parker against Washington State. Bolden scored only three points, but his defense helped the team win 83–50 for their widest margin of victory of the season. On 14 February 2016, he led the team with a career-high 16 points to go with nine rebounds in a 78–65 win over Arizona State. The Bruins lost their final five games of the season to finish with a 15–17 record. Bolden made 11 starts, and averaged 4.6 points and 4.8 rebounds in 21.7 minutes in 31 games. He ranked third on the team with 27 blocks.

Bolden felt that he was underutilized during his first season. During the offseason, he hoped to move to small forward, the position he was recruited to play, but he remained in a big man role, even with reserve György Golomán healthy again. Possessing potential talent to play in the NBA, Bolden decided to forego his remaining two years of college eligibility and play professionally, despite having already missed out on declaring for the 2016 NBA draft.

== Professional career ==
=== FMP (2016–2017) ===
Bolden signed with FMP of the ABA League and the Basketball League of Serbia, where he played both forward positions. On 15 March 2017, Bolden was awarded the ABA League Top Prospect title after averaging 12.9 points and 7.2 rebounds per game in his rookie season. He also averaged 4.2 three-point field goal attempts per game, making 41.9 per cent, and added one steal and one block per game.

=== Maccabi Tel Aviv (2017–2018) ===
On 10 June 2017, Bolden signed a two-year contract with Crvena zvezda. Twelve days later, Bolden was selected with the 36th pick of the 2017 NBA draft by the Philadelphia 76ers. In July 2017, he joined the 76ers for the 2017 NBA Summer League.

Before even suiting up for a single regular season game for the Crvena zvezda, on 21 July 2017, Bolden signed a three-year contract with the Israeli club Maccabi Tel Aviv. On 12 December 2017, Bolden recorded a season-high 23 points, shooting 8-of-14 from the field, along with 10 rebounds, 3 assists and 3 steals in a 98–90 win over Ironi Nahariya. Bolden went on to win the 2017 Israeli League Cup and the 2018 Israeli League Championship titles with Maccabi.

=== Philadelphia 76ers (2018–2020) ===
On 25 July 2018, Bolden signed with the Philadelphia 76ers. On 16 October 2018, he made his NBA debut playing in a single minute under a 107–85 loss to the Boston Celtics. As an NBA rookie in 2018–19, Bolden had multiple assignments to the Delaware Blue Coats, the 76ers' NBA G League affiliate. He was part of the 76ers' rotation during the 2019 playoffs.

Bolden was waived on 7 February 2020.

=== Phoenix Suns (2020) ===
On 12 February 2020, Bolden was signed to a 10-day contract by the Phoenix Suns, who were without big men Frank Kaminsky, Aron Baynes, Dario Šarić and Deandre Ayton during that time. In his debut that day, he had six points, seven rebounds and a plus–minus of +17 in 26 minutes in a 112–106 win over the Golden State Warriors. Bolden played in two more games for the Suns, which saw all of their big men (minus Kaminsky) return to action before he was not signed for a second 10-day contract on February 24.

Bolden subsequently retired from basketball at age 25 to pursue a career in cryptocurrency.

=== Sydney Kings (2023–2024) ===
On 19 June 2023, Bolden came out of retirement and signed with the Sydney Kings for the 2023–24 NBL season.

=== Capitanes de Arecibo (2024) ===
On 18 March 2024, Bolden signed with Capitanes de Arecibo of the BSN for the 2024 season.

=== New Zealand Breakers (2024–2025) ===
On 2 May 2024, Bolden signed with the New Zealand Breakers for the 2024–25 NBL season.

=== Capitanes de Arecibo and Cangrejeros de Santurce (2025) ===
Bolden re-joined Capitanes de Arecibo for the 2025 Baloncesto Superior Nacional season. On 8 May 2025, he joined Cangrejeros de Santurce. He played three games for Cangrejeros de Santurce before returning to Capitanes de Arecibo for one final game on June 22.

=== Illawarra Hawks (2025–2026) ===
On 7 August 2025, Bolden signed with the Illawarra Hawks for the 2025–26 NBL season. He missed the start of the season with a foot injury. He went on to play eight games, averaging 4.4 points and 5.5 rebounds per game, before being ruled out for the rest of the season on 28 November with an achilles injury.

=== Cairns Taipans (2026–present) ===
On 28 July 2026, Bolden signed with the Cairns Taipans for the 2026–27 NBL season.

== National team career ==
Bolden played for the Australian national under-19 team at the 2013 FIBA Under-19 World Championship in the Czech Republic at the age of 17. He played in eight of the nine games that Australia competed in, averaging 2.6 points and 2.9 rebounds while playing 10.1 minutes per game. His top performance was a nine-point game against Senegal. In August 2019, Bolden made his senior debut for the Australian Boomers in an exhibition win against Canada leading up to the 2019 FIBA World Cup. Although he was one the best players in that game, he withdrew from the World Cup afterwards, citing personal reasons.

== Career statistics ==
Legend
| GP | Games played | GS | Games started | MPG | Minutes per game |
| FG% | Field-goal percentage | 3P% | 3-point field-goal percentage | FT% | Free-throw percentage |
| RPG | Rebounds per game | APG | Assists per game | SPG | Steals per game |
| BPG | Blocks per game | PPG | Points per game | PIR | Performance index rating |
| **Bold** | Career high |

=== NBA ===
==== Regular season ====
| Year | Team | GP | GS | MPG | FG% | 3P% | FT% | RPG | APG | SPG | BPG | PPG |
|---|---|---|---|---|---|---|---|---|---|---|---|---|
| 2018–19 | Philadelphia | **44** | **10** | **14.5** | .494 | **.354** | .481 | **3.8** | **.9** | .4 | **.9** | **4.7** |
| 2019–20 | Philadelphia | 4 | 0 | 3.5 | **.667** | .000 | .000 | .3 | .0 | .3 | .0 | 1.0 |
| 2019–20 | Phoenix | 3 | 0 | 11.0 | .250 | .000 | **1.000** | 2.7 | .0 | **.7** | .7 | 2.0 |
| Career | | 51 | 10 | 13.5 | .486 | .340 | .484 | 3.4 | .8 | .4 | .8 | 4.3 |

==== Playoffs ====
| Year | Team | GP | GS | MPG | FG% | 3P% | FT% | RPG | APG | SPG | BPG | PPG |
|---|---|---|---|---|---|---|---|---|---|---|---|---|
| 2019 | Philadelphia | 10 | 0 | 7.9 | .263 | .250 | .500 | 1.4 | .3 | .2 | .1 | 1.6 |
| Career | | 10 | 0 | 7.9 | .263 | .250 | .500 | 1.4 | .3 | .2 | .1 | 1.6 |

=== EuroLeague ===
| Year | Team | GP | GS | MPG | FG% | 3P% | FT% | RPG | APG | SPG | BPG | PPG | PIR |
|---|---|---|---|---|---|---|---|---|---|---|---|---|---|
| 2017–18 | Maccabi | 29 | 28 | 21.1 | .487 | .319 | .512 | 5.5 | 1.6 | 1.2 | .9 | 6.9 | 10.4 |
| Career | | 29 | 28 | 21.1 | .487 | .319 | .512 | 5.5 | 1.6 | 1.2 | .9 | 6.9 | 10.4 |

=== College ===
| Year | Team | GP | GS | MPG | FG% | 3P% | FT% | RPG | APG | SPG | BPG | PPG |
|---|---|---|---|---|---|---|---|---|---|---|---|---|
| 2015–16 | UCLA | 31 | 11 | 21.7 | .415 | .250 | .733 | 4.8 | 1.1 | .7 | .9 | 4.6 |

== See also ==
- List of foreign basketball players in Serbia
- List of NBA drafted players from Serbia
