= Miller Grove High School (Georgia) =

Public high school in Stonecrest, Georgia, United States

Location
- 2645 Dekalb Medical Parkway; Stonecrest, Georgia 30058; United States; 33.710°N 84.149°W

Information
- Type: Public high school
- Established: 2004
- School district: DeKalb County School District
- NCES School ID: 130174003332
- Principal: Latashia Searcy
- Teaching staff: 70.00 (on an FTE basis)
- Grades: 9–12
- Enrollment: 1,109 (2023–2024)
- Student to teacher ratio: 15.84
- Colors: Purple and gray
- Mascot: Wolverine
- Website: millergrovehs.dekalb.k12.ga.us

Miller Grove High School is a public high school in Stonecrest, Georgia, near Lithonia. It is part of the DeKalb County School District.

== Academics ==
The school's Advanced Placement offerings include chemistry, English language, English literature, physics, psychology, U.S. history, and World History: Modern.

=== Demographics ===
The demographic breakdown of the 1,317 students enrolled in the 2018–2019 school year was:

- American Indian/Alaska Native — 1
- Asian — 9
- Black — 1,256
- Hispanic — 28
- White — 4
- Two or More Races — 19

== Notable alumni ==
- Stephen Hill (class of 2009), football player
- Tony Parker (class of 2012), basketball player
- Alterique Gilbert (class of 2016), basketball player

== In social media ==
In March 2020, an image of a student reading a book on a staircase with the caption "Only at miller grove" was posted on Instagram, and became a viral meme on social media, particularly TikTok, Twitter, Snapchat, and Instagram.
