= Tony Parker (basketball, born 1993) =

American basketball player (born 1993)

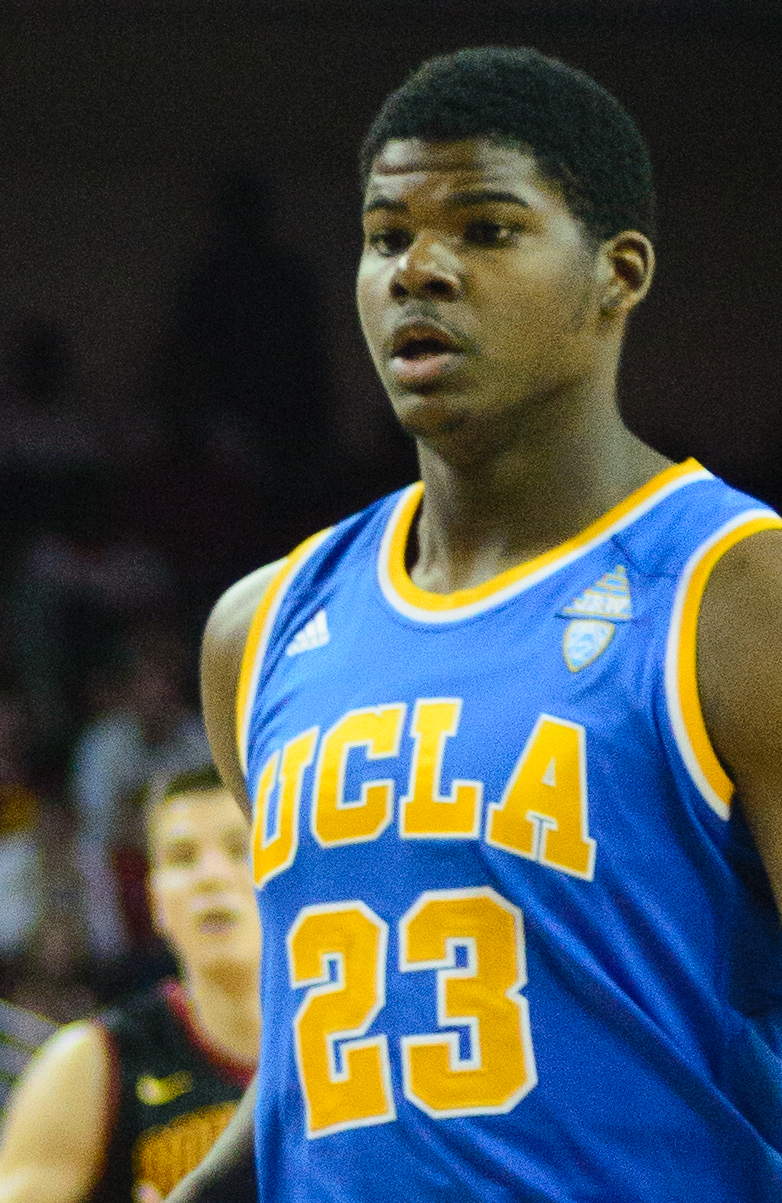
- Parker in college with UCLA in 2014

Personal information
- Born: September 18, 1993 (age 33) Atlanta, Georgia, U.S.
- Listed height: 6 ft 9 in (2.06 m)
- Listed weight: 260 lb (118 kg)

Career information
- High school: Miller Grove (Lithonia, Georgia)
- College: UCLA (2012–2016)
- NBA draft: 2016: undrafted
- Playing career: 2017–2019
- Position: Power forward / center

Career history
- 2017: Iowa Wolves
- 2018: Frayles de Guasave
- 2018–2019: Aguacateros de Michoacán

Career highlights
- McDonald's All-American (2012); First-team Parade All-American (2012); Mr. Georgia Basketball (2012)
Medals
Men's basketball
Representing the United States
FIBA World U17 Championship
Gold medal – first place	2010 Hamburg	National team

Virgil Anthony Parker (born September 18, 1993) is an American former professional basketball player. He played college basketball for the UCLA Bruins at both center and power forward. He played for the Iowa Wolves of the NBA G League.

As a high school player in Georgia, Parker won four consecutive state championships and was named the top player in the state. He also earned national All-American honors. Parker joined UCLA in 2012 as part of the top recruiting class in the nation, and helped the school to three NCAA tournaments, including consecutive Sweet 16 appearances in 2014 and 2015. He became a starter in his junior year and finished his four-year college career ranked No. 6 in UCLA history in career games played. After graduating, he played in the G League before playing in Mexico.

== Early life ==
Parker was born in Atlanta, Georgia, to Virgil and Hazel Parker. His father played college basketball. Growing up, Parker would tag along with his older brother, Adrian, and watch him play basketball at a local court. When Parker was five, his brother was arrested and went to prison for 20 years for armed robbery. While Adrian was away, Parker helped take care of his brother's son, Jayvion.

By the seventh grade, Parker stood 6 feet 3 inches (1.91 m) and weighed 300 pounds (140 kg), and would be mistaken for a lineman. He attended Miller Grove High School in Lithonia, Georgia, and some doubted whether he could play basketball for them. However, he led their team to four consecutive state titles (2009–2012), the first time a player in Georgia had started for four straight state champions since Dontonio Wingfield (1990–1993). With the help of a personal trainer, his strength and conditioning improved each season. As a senior, Parker averaged 16.6 points, 11.0 rebounds, and 3.0 blocks per game. He was named Mr. Georgia Basketball as the top player in the state, and was recognized nationally as a Parade, McDonald's and Jordan Brand All-American.

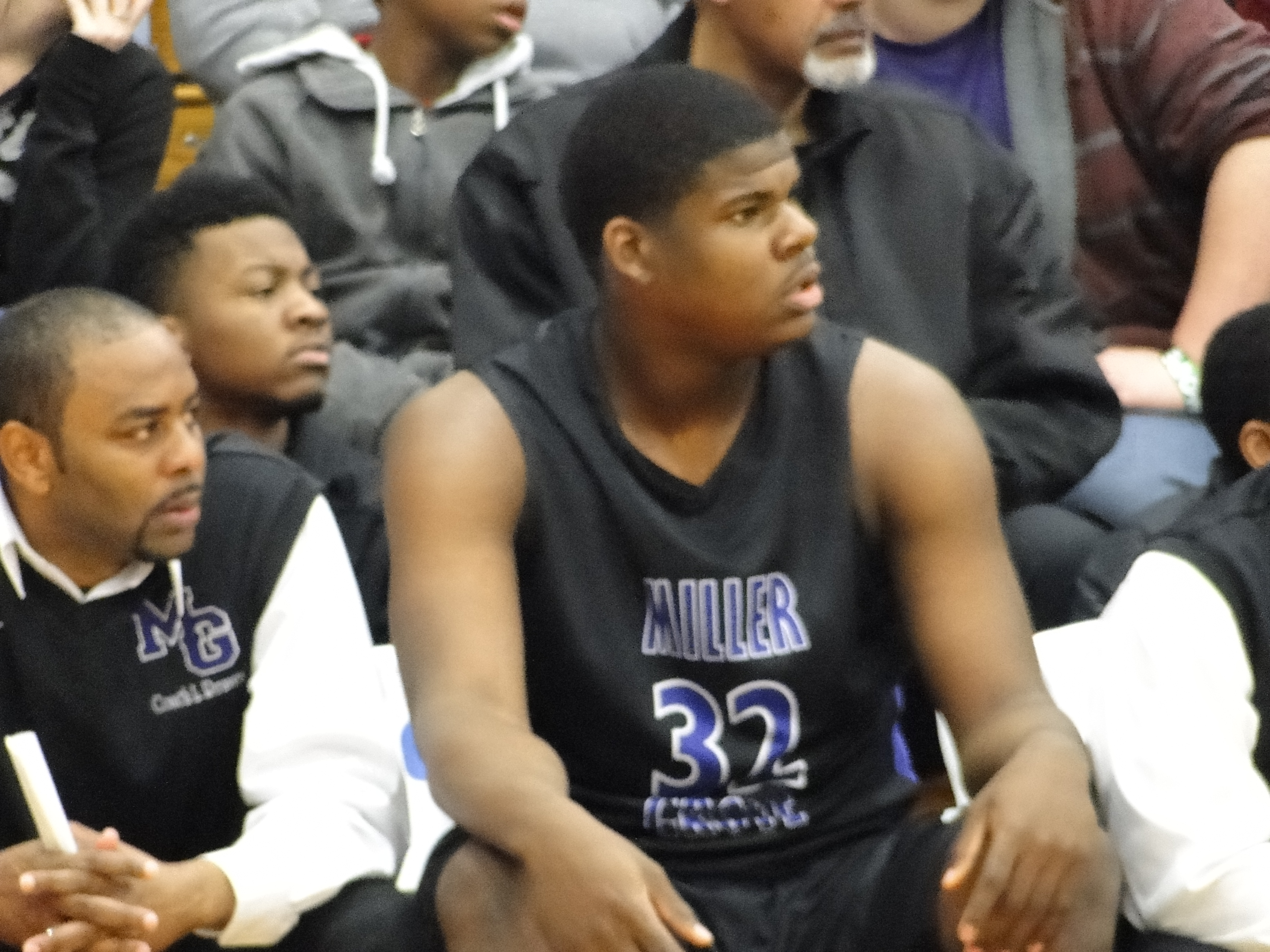
Parker at Miller Grove High School in 2011

As a senior, he was rated a four-star prospect, ranked No. 20 player in the nation by Scout.com, No. 26 by ESPN.com and No. 27 by Rivals.com. He was rated the No. 6 center in the country by Rivals, No. 7 by ESPN and No. 8 by Scout. Parker chose to play college basketball at UCLA over Kansas, Duke, Ohio State, Memphis, and Georgia.

== College career ==
Parker joined Shabazz Muhammad, Kyle Anderson and Jordan Adams in a UCLA recruiting class considered the best in the nation. The four all knew each other from competing in Amateur Athletic Union (AAU). Muhammad and Anderson were also McDonald's All-Americans. Parker's former AAU coach with the Atlanta Celtics, Korey McCray, had joined UCLA the previous year as an assistant coach; Adams had played for the Celtics too.

Bothered by injuries and lack of conditioning, the 6-foot-9-inch (2.06 m), 275-pound (125 kg) Parker did not play much as a freshman in 2012–13, averaging 2.4 points and 1.4 rebounds in 6.3 minutes per game. He was the team's only big body with an inside presence after Anthony Stover was dismissed from the team and Joshua Smith transferred mid-season. However, Coach Ben Howland rarely played Parker off the bench, relying instead on 6-foot-10-inch (2.08 m) twins David and Travis Wear, who were primarily jump shooters as opposed to post players. Parker became so unhappy he considered transferring. He finished the season averaging a Pac-12 Conference-worst 10.4 fouls per 40 minutes, and the Bruins had the worst rebounding margin in the conference.

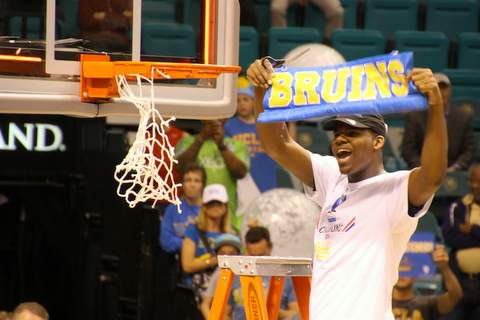
Parker cutting the net after UCLA won the 2014 Pac-12 tournament

During the offseason, UCLA replaced Howland with Steve Alford. Parker lost 20–25 pounds (9.1–11.3 kg), and began 2013–14 in better shape than in his first year. On January 23, 2014, he scored a then-career-high 22 points on 9 of 14 shooting in a 91–74 win over Stanford. His averages improved in his sophomore year to 6.9 points and 4.4 rebounds. He finally became a starter in 2014–15, boosting his performance to 11.5 points and 6.7 rebounds per game. He was the final player remaining from the highly touted 2012 recruiting class—the other three had moved on to the National Basketball Association (NBA). Parker showed improvement on offense with his post moves, becoming the team's primary inside threat. He ranked sixth in the Pac-12 in field goal percentage (54.3). He was also more focused on defense, but was still prone to foul trouble. Alford called him the team's most important player. When Parker missed the road trip to the Oregon schools, UCLA went 0–2 and lost by a combined 29 points. He returned against Utah, when the Bruins earned their best win of the season as Parker's inside play balanced their offense that had become overly dependent on their perimeter players. On March 21, 2015, in the 2015 NCAA tournament, Parker scored a career-high 28 points and added 12 rebounds in a 92–75 win over UAB, helping the Bruins advance to the Sweet 16 for the second straight year.

Parker returned as the Bruins' lone senior in 2015–16, but the team did not advance to the NCAA Tournament for the first time in his career. With Kevon Looney having left for the NBA, Parker was moved to forward and Thomas Welsh entered the starting lineup at center. Parker was named to the initial watch list of twenty candidates for the Karl Malone Award, given annually to the top power forward in Division I men's basketball. In the season opener, he scored 19 points and established career highs of 19 rebounds, nine offensive rebounds, and four assists in an 84–81 loss to Monmouth. He became the first Bruin to have double-doubles in the first three games of a season since Bill Walton recorded nine consecutive to start 1973–74. The Bruins began the season 9–4 with Parker logging seven double-doubles in those 13 games. However, he had just two double-doubles in the final 19 games, when UCLA lost 13 times to finish with a 15–17 record. After the Bruins struggled on defense while starting 3–5 in their conference schedule, Alford believed their big front court was "slow" and had Jonah Bolden start against Washington State in place of Parker, who was averaging 13.5 points and 9.6 rebounds as a starter. While Bolden was 1 inch (2.5 cm) taller than Parker, he was also 40 pounds (18 kg) lighter. The switch helped UCLA win 83–50 for their largest margin of victory of the season; Parker scored 11 points in 18 minutes, which was 10 minutes below his average. After five games as a reserve, Parker returned to the starting lineup in place of Welsh, who had presented the coaches with the idea. The Bruins played their best game in weeks, winning 77–53 over Colorado, but they lost their final five games of the season. Parker finished the season with averages of 12.6 points, 8.2 rebounds and 1.0 blocks in 25.1 minutes per game. He ranked eighth in the Pac-12 in rebounding, first in offensive rebounds per game (3.3), and ninth in field goal percentage (53.9). He ended his four-year career having played 136 games, which ranked sixth in UCLA history.

== Professional career ==
Parker worked out for the Los Angeles Clippers prior to the 2016 NBA draft. However, most mock drafts did not list him, and he went undrafted. He sat out the 2016–17 season with an injury.

In 2017, Parker participated in the NBA G League's annual Player Invitational to earn a spot in the league's upcoming draft. He was drafted in the second round of the 2017 draft with the 27th overall pick by the Iowa Wolves. He played seven games and averaged 3.1 points and 2.6 rebounds before being waived on December 27. He later played in Mexico with Frayles de Guasave of the CIBACOPA for the 2018 season, and joined Aguacateros de Michoacán in the LNBP for 2018–19.

== Career statistics ==
College statistics

Year	Team	GP	GS	MPG	FG%	3P%	FT%	RPG	APG	SPG	BPG	PPG
2012–13	UCLA	33	0	6.3	.541	—	.438	1.2	.0	.1	.3	2.4
2013–14	UCLA	37	9	17.2	.602	—	.468	4.4	.1	.4	.6	6.9
2014–15	UCLA	34	33	24.6	.543	—	.575	6.7	.4	.6	.9	11.5
2015–16	UCLA	32	27	25.1	.539	—	.493	8.2	.7	.6	1.0	12.6
Career		136	69	18.3	.555	—	.516	5.1	.3	.4	.7	8.3
