= Bryce Alford =

American basketball player (born 1995)

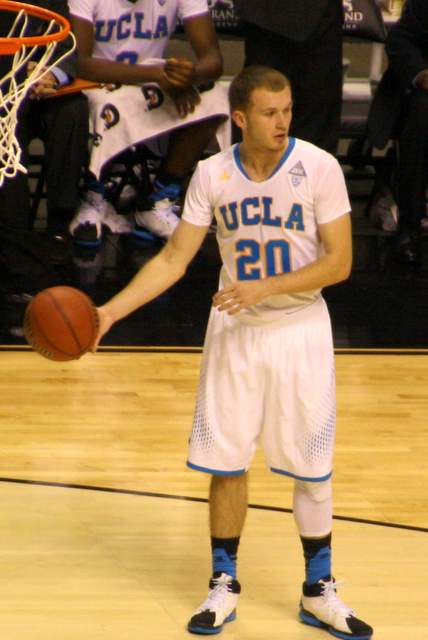
- Alford with the UCLA Bruins in 2014

Oklahoma City Thunder
- Title: Assistant coach
- League: NBA

Personal information
- Born: January 18, 1995 (age 31) Indianapolis, Indiana, U.S.
- Listed height: 6 ft 3 in (1.91 m)
- Listed weight: 185 lb (84 kg)

Career information
- High school: La Cueva (Albuquerque, New Mexico)
- College: UCLA (2013–2017)
- NBA draft: 2017: undrafted
- Playing career: 2017–2024
- Position: Shooting guard / point guard

Career history

Playing
- 2017–2019: Oklahoma City Blue
- 2019–2020: Medi Bayreuth
- 2020–2021: S.L. Benfica
- 2021–2022: Windy City Bulls
- 2022–2023: Zastal Zielona Góra
- 2023: BK Pardubice
- 2023–2024: Arka Gdynia

Coaching
- 2024–2026: Oklahoma City Blue (assistant)
- 2026–present: Oklahoma City Thunder (assistant)

Career highlights
- First-team All-Pac-12 (2017); Pac-12 All-Freshman team (2014); First-team Parade All-American (2013); New Mexico Gatorade Player of the Year (2013)
- Stats at NBA.com
- Stats at Basketball Reference

Bryce Michael Alford (born January 18, 1995) is an American former professional basketball player who is an assistant coach for the Oklahoma City Blue of the NBA G League. He played college basketball for the UCLA Bruins. He set school records for the most three-point field goals made in a game, season, and career. He earned first-team all-conference honors in the Pac-12 as a senior in 2016–17.

As a senior in high school in New Mexico, Alford set a state single-season scoring record, and was named the state's top high school player. He was named one of the top freshmen in the Pac-12 in his first season with UCLA. As a sophomore in 2014–15, he became the team's starting point guard and set the Bruins' record for most three-pointers made in a season. Alford moved to shooting guard as a senior, when he surpassed his own single-season record and became the Bruins' career leader in three-pointers made. After going undrafted in the 2017 NBA draft, he began his pro career playing two seasons for the Oklahoma City Blue in the NBA G League. He also played in Germany, Portugal, Poland, and the Czech Republic. He is the son of former basketball player Steve Alford, who was also his head coach at UCLA.

== Early life ==
Alford was born in Manchester, Indiana, to Tanya and Steve Alford, a college basketball coach and former professional player. His father was coaching at Manchester College at the time. By the time Alford was five, he would sit in on his father's locker room talks, and stood beside him during news conferences.

Alford attended La Cueva High School in Albuquerque, New Mexico. He averaged 25.3 points and 4.6 assists in his junior year, when he also led the Bears to the Class 5A title game. In March 2012, he verbally committed to attend the University of New Mexico, where he would play college basketball under his father, who was coaching the Lobos. He signed a National Letter of Intent to accept New Mexico's athletic scholarship offer in December.

As a senior, Alford broke a 50-year-old New Mexico high school single-season scoring record with 1,050 points. He averaged 37.7 points, 8.5 rebounds, 6.4 assists, and 2.6 steals while leading his team to a 22–6 record and the Class 5A quarterfinals. For the season, he was named New Mexico's Gatorade Player of the Year. While he earned first-team Parade All-American honors, recruiting services did not rank him among the top 100 overall players nationally. He was ranked No. 44 at shooting guard, but he considered himself a point guard. Steve believed his son's commitment to play for him negatively impacted his ranking. Alford participated in USA Basketball's training camp for the 2013 FIBA Under-19 World Championship, where he was eager to gain national attention.

== College career ==
In March 2013, Steve became the coach at the University of California, Los Angeles (UCLA), and Alford followed him. The Bruins rarely sought players who were not four- or five-star recruits. With Alford rated a consensus three-star prospect, skeptics were wary of nepotism. In Alford's first season in 2013–14, his father groomed him over fellow freshman Zach LaVine to be the team's backup point guard behind starter Kyle Anderson. However, Alford started the season slowly, averaging only five points on 37.9 percent shooting through the first six games. Fans began questioning Alford's role compared to the crowd-favorite LaVine's, and he felt pressure to justify his scholarship. Alford cited two games that helped boost his confidence: an 18-point game early in the season in the Las Vegas Invitational, and a 20-point performance in the Pac-12 season opener against USC that followed his scoreless game against Alabama. On February 27, 2014, with stars Anderson and Jordan Adams suspended, Alford scored 31 points in an 87–83 double-overtime loss at home to Oregon. He became the first UCLA freshman since Don MacLean in 1988 to exceed 30 points in a game. For the season, Alford averaged eight points and 2.8 assists in 23 minutes per game, and was named to the Pac-12 All-Freshman Team. He and LaVine were named the Bruins' top freshmen.

After Anderson and LaVine left UCLA for the National Basketball Association (NBA), Alford became the Bruins' starting point guard in 2014–15. Although he was considered more of a shooter than a true point guard, Alford was the team's only legitimate option for the position. Twice in the first three games he reached double figures in both points and assists to record the first double-doubles of his career. On November 20, 2014, he scored 28 points along with a career-high 13 assists in a 107–74 win over Nicholls State. During a five-game losing streak later in the season, Alford had a streak of 19 consecutive missed shots, part of stretch in which he made just 5 of 39 attempts. Criticism for him being the coach's son was at its peak, but the team looked to him and senior Norman Powell for leadership. At season's end, Alford received honorable mention for the All-Pac-12 team. Proving most major projections wrong, UCLA received an invite to the 2015 NCAA tournament, earning a No. 11 seed. In the Bruins' opener, Alford made four three-point field goals in the final four minutes and was credited with the game-winning three-pointer after a goaltending call with 13 seconds remaining in a 60–59 win over sixth-seeded SMU. He finished with a game-high 27 points and connected on 9 of 11 three-point attempts, the most ever made by a UCLA player in the NCAA Tournament and tying the school record held by Jason Kapono for the most in any game. (Note: Kapono made 9 of 11 against Washington State on January 4, 2003.) Alford also broke the Bruins' single-season record for made three-pointers, held for eight years by Arron Afflalo. (Note: Afflalo made 87 in 2006–07.)

As a junior in 2015–16, Alford began the season sharing point guard duties with freshman starter Aaron Holiday. In the conference opener against Washington, Alford was shooting just 1 of 13 in the game when he made two three-pointers with 23 seconds left in regulation to force overtime, and forced a second overtime with another tying three-pointer. UCLA lost the game and began the season 0–2 in the Pac-12, while Alford shot just 7 for 31. The Bruins ended their losing streak the following game when Alford scored 25 points and made the game-winning three-pointer with 1.8 seconds left in an 87–84 win over No. 7 Arizona. In the subsequent game against Arizona State, he made a three-pointer with 24 seconds remaining in the game to secure an 81–74 win. He was named Pac-12 Player of the Week after averaging 21.5 points in the two games on 55 percent shooting. Alford was often clutch during the season, but he made just 38.5% of his shots despite leading the team in attempts. He finished the season ranked seventh in the Pac-12 in scoring with 16.1 points per game, second in assists with 5.2 per game, and second in assist-turnover ratio (2.7). The National Association of Basketball Coaches (NABC) named him second-team All-District 20, and he again received honorable mention for the All-Pac-12 team.

Alford moved to shooting guard in 2016–17 after highly touted freshman point guard Lonzo Ball arrived at UCLA. During the season, Alford established career highs shooting 48 percent from the field and 43 percent on three-pointers, and was named first-team All-Pac-12 along with teammates Ball and T. J. Leaf. He also became the first player in UCLA history to reach career totals of both 1,700 points and 500 assists. On January 12, 2017, Alford scored a career-high 37 points in a 104–89 win at Colorado. He also tied his career high with nine three-pointers, helping UCLA set a school record with 19 three-pointers made. On February 25, he scored a team-high 15 points to lead the No. 5 Bruins to a 77–72 win over No. 4 Arizona, which also snapped their conference rivals' 21-game home winning streak. He also made 3-of-7 three-pointers to surpass his own single-season school record for three-point field goals made (93). In the regular season finale against Washington State, Alford made two three-pointers in a 77–68 win to tie Kapono's school record for career three-pointers made (317). In UCLA's opener in the Pac-12 tournament, Alford made two three-pointers to become the Bruins' career leader in a 74–69 win over USC. He finished his UCLA career as the fifth-leading scorer in school history, and graduated with a degree in political science.

== Professional career ==
=== Oklahoma City Blue (2017–2019) ===
After going undrafted in the 2017 NBA draft, Alford signed with the Golden State Warriors to play on their summer league team. He later signed a training camp contract with the Oklahoma City Thunder. Alford was waived by the Thunder on October 11, 2017, about a week before the start of the regular season; he had not played in their four preseason games. He joined the Oklahoma City Blue, the Thunder's NBA G League team, as an affiliate player. In 2017–18, he started 27 of 50 games and averaged 15.5 points while made a league-leading 186 three-pointers at a 40.4 percent clip. After the season, Alford participated in the G League Elite Mini Camp, where he was the third-leading scorer (13.5 points per game) among the group of 51 players. He joined the Indiana Pacers summer league squad, where he was reunited with former UCLA teammates Holiday, Leaf, and Ike Anigbogu.

Alford was signed to the Thunder's 2018–19 training camp roster on an Exhibit 10 contract, but was waived after playing sparingly in three preseason games. He was added to the Oklahoma City Blue training camp roster on October 23, 2018.

=== Europe (2019–2021) ===
On June 28, 2019, Medi Bayreuth of the Basketball Bundesliga announced that they had signed Alford.

On January 1, 2021, Alford joined S.L. Benfica of the LPB in Portugal.

=== Windy City Bulls (2021–2022) ===
On October 14, 2021, Alford signed with the Chicago Bulls, but was waived the same day. He joined the Windy City Bulls as an affiliate player.

=== Return to Europe (2022–2024) ===
Alford joined Zastal Zielona Góra of the Polish Basketball League for the 2022–23 season. He began 2023–24 with BK Pardubice of the Czech National Basketball League. He played in two EuroCup games, but he exercised an out in his contract when they did not qualify for further international competition. On November 19, 2023, he signed with Arka Gdynia of the Polish Basketball League (PLK).

== Coaching career ==
Alford joined the Oklahoma City Blue staff as an assistant coach in 2024–25.

== National team career ==
Alford was selected to play for the United States national team in their second round of qualifiers for the 2019 World Cup. He helped the US go 2–0 in their September 2018 games to extend their record to 7–1 with two remaining windows to play.

== Career statistics ==
Legend
GP	Games played	GS	Games started	MPG	Minutes per game
FG%	Field goal percentage	3P%	3-point field goal percentage	FT%	Free throw percentage
RPG	Rebounds per game	APG	Assists per game	SPG	Steals per game
BPG	Blocks per game	PPG	Points per game	**Bold**	Career high

=== NBA G League ===
==== Regular season ====
Year	Team	GP	GS	MPG	FG%	3P%	FT%	RPG	APG	SPG	BPG	PPG
2017–18	Oklahoma City	50	27	30.9	.411	.407	.793	2.9	2.0	.9	.1	15.5
Career		50	27	30.9	.411	.407	.793	2.9	2.0	.9	.1	15.5

==== Playoffs ====
Year	Team	GP	GS	MPG	FG%	3P%	FT%	RPG	APG	SPG	BPG	PPG
2017–18	Oklahoma City	1	1	37.0	.600	.500	1.000	1.0	2.0	1.0	.0	19.0
Career		1	1	37.0	.600	.500	1.000	1.0	2.0	1.0	.0	19.0

=== College ===
Year	Team	GP	GS	MPG	FG%	3P%	FT%	RPG	APG	SPG	BPG	PPG
2013–14	UCLA	**37**	1	23.1	.384	.385	.804	1.8	2.8	.8	**.1**	8.0
2014–15	UCLA	36	**36**	**36.3**	.396	.391	**.838**	3.2	4.9	**.9**	.0	15.4
2015–16	UCLA	32	32	36.2	.385	.367	.831	**3.8**	**5.2**	.7	.0	**16.1**
2016–17	UCLA	36	**36**	33.0	**.447**	**.430**	.821	2.5	2.6	.5	**.1**	15.5
Career		141	105	32.0	.405	.397	.825	2.8	3.8	.8	.1	13.6

== Coaching career ==
In November 2024, Alford was hired as an assistant coach for the Oklahoma City Blue.

== Personal life ==
Alford married Ali Warner in 2019. He is a Christian.
