= 2015–16 Washington State Cougars men's basketball team =

American college basketball season

2015–16 Washington State Cougars men's basketball
- Conference: Pac-12 Conference
- Record: 9–22 (1–17 Pac-12)
- Head coach: Ernie Kent (2nd season)
- Assistant coaches: Greg Graham; Silvey Dominguez; Curtis Allen
- Home arena: Beasley Coliseum

2015–16 Pac-12 Conference men's basketball standings
	Conf.				Overall
Team	W		L	PCT	W		L	PCT
No. 5 Oregon †	14	–	4	.778	31	–	7	.816
No. 13 Utah	13	–	5	.722	27	–	9	.750
No. 17 Arizona	12	–	6	.667	25	–	9	.735
No. 23 California	12	–	6	.667	23	–	11	.676
Colorado	10	–	8	.556	22	–	12	.647
USC	9	–	9	.500	21	–	13	.618
Oregon State	9	–	9	.500	19	–	13	.594
Washington	9	–	9	.500	19	–	15	.559
Stanford	8	–	10	.444	15	–	15	.500
UCLA	6	–	12	.333	15	–	17	.469
Arizona State	5	–	13	.278	15	–	17	.469
Washington State	1	–	17	.056	9	–	22	.290
† Pac-12 Tournament winner Rankings from AP poll

The 2015–16 Washington State Cougars men's basketball team represented Washington State University during the 2015–16 NCAA Division I men's basketball season. This was Ernie Kent's second year as head coach at Washington State. The Cougars played their home games at the Beasley Coliseum as members of the Pac-12 Conference. They finished the season 9–22, 1–17 in Pac-12 play to finish in last place. They lost in the first round of the Pac-12 tournament to Colorado.

== Previous season ==
The 2014–15 Cougars finished the season with an overall record of 13–18, and 7–11 in conference play. The Cougars lost to Cal in the first round of the Pac-12 Tournament.

== Departures ==
Name	Number	Pos.	Height	Weight	Year	Hometown	Reason for departure
Jackie Davis	1	G	6'3"	195	Freshman	Long Beach, CA	Transferred
Jordan Railey	4	C	7'0"	245	RS senior	Beaverton, OR	Graduated
Dexter Kernich-Drew	10	G	6'7"	190	RS senior	Melbourne, Australia	Graduated
Trevor Dunbar	11	G	5'10"	170	Freshman	San Francisco, California	Transferred to City College of San Francisco
Aaron Cheatum	20	F	6'7"	240	Junior	Moreno Valley, California	Transferred to Cal State Dominguez Hills
DaVonté Lacy	25	G	6'4"	210	Senior	Tacoma, Washington	Graduated

=== Incoming transfers ===
Name	Number	Pos.	Height	Weight	Year	Hometown	Notes
Derrien King	0	F	6'8"	175	Sophomore	Los Angeles, California	Junior college transferred from Santa Monica College
Renard Suggs	1	G	6'3"	200	Junior	Woodbury, Minnesota	Junior college transferred from Gillette College
Charles Callison	23	G	6'0"	180	Junior	Moreno, California	Junior college transferred from San Bernardino Valley College
Conor Clifford	42	C	7'0"	270	RS junior	Huntington Beach, California	Junior college transferred from Saddleback College

=== 2015 recruiting class ===
College recruiting
Name	Hometown	School	Height	Weight	Commit date
Jeff Pollard; PF	Bountiful, Utah	Bountiful HS	6 ft 8 in (2.03 m)	220 lb (100 kg)	Jun 25, 2014
Jeff Pollard; PF	Recruit ratings: Scout: Rivals: 247Sports: ESPN:				
Vionte Daniels; SG	Federal Way, Washington	Federal Way HS	6 ft 1 in (1.85 m)	160 lb (73 kg)	Apr 1, 2015
Vionte Daniels; SG	Recruit ratings: Scout: Rivals: 247Sports: ESPN:				
Robert Franks; PF	Vancouver, Washington	Evergreen HS	6 ft 8 in (2.03 m)	200 lb (91 kg)	Sep 29, 2014
Robert Franks; PF	Recruit ratings: Scout: Rivals: 247Sports: ESPN:				
Overall recruit ranking:
Note: In many cases, Scout, Rivals, 247Sports, On3, and ESPN may conflict in their listings of height and weight.; In these cases, the average was taken. ESPN grades are on a 100-point scale.; Sources: "2015 Washington St. Basketball Commitment List". Rivals.; "2015 Washington State Cougars Basketball Commits". ESPN.; "2015 Team Ranking". Rivals.

== Roster ==
2015–16 Washington State Cougars men's basketball team
Players
Coaches

Pos.	#	Name	Height	Weight	Year	Previous school	Hometown
F	0	Derrien King	6 ft 6 in (1.98 m)	170 lb (77 kg)	So	Santa Monica College	Wichita, Kansas
G	1	Renard Suggs	6 ft 2 in (1.88 m)	188 lb (85 kg)	Jr	Gillette College	Saint Paul, Minnesota
G	2	Ike Iroegbu	6 ft 2 in (1.88 m)	195 lb (88 kg)	Jr	Oak Hill Acad.	Elk Grove, California
G	3	Ny Redding	6 ft 2 in (1.88 m)	166 lb (75 kg)	So	Westwind Prep	Solon, Ohio
G	4	Viont'e Daniels	6 ft 2 in (1.88 m)	163 lb (74 kg)	Fr	Federal Way HS	Federal Way, Washington
F	15	Junior Longrus	6 ft 7 in (2.01 m)	240 lb (109 kg)	Sr	Bishop O'Dowd HS	Oakland, California
F	22	Robert Franks	6 ft 7 in (2.01 m)	250 lb (113 kg)	Fr	Evergreen HS	Vancouver, Washington
G	23	Charles Callison	6 ft 0 in (1.83 m)	183 lb (83 kg)	Jr	San Bernardino Valley College	Moreno Valley, California
F	24	Josh Hawkinson	6 ft 10 in (2.08 m)	232 lb (105 kg)	Jr	East Shorewood HS	Shoreline, WA
F	32	Que Johnson	6 ft 5 in (1.96 m)	208 lb (94 kg)	RS Jr	Westwind Prep	Pontiac, Michigan
F	33	Brett Boese	6 ft 7 in (2.01 m)	230 lb (104 kg)	Sr	Shadle Park HS	Spokane, Washington
C	42	Conor Clifford	7 ft 0 in (2.13 m)	283 lb (128 kg)	RS Jr	Saddleback College	Huntington Beach, California
C	45	Valentine Izundu	6 ft 10 in (2.08 m)	235 lb (107 kg)	RS Jr	Houston	Houston, Texas

Head coach

- Ernie Kent (Oregon)

Assistant coach(es)

- Greg Graham (Oregon)
- Silvey Dominguez (New Mexico)
- Curtis Allen (Washington)

Legend

- (C) Team captain
- (S) Suspended
- (I) Ineligible
- (W) Walk-on
- Injured
- Current redshirt

Roster

== Schedule ==
Washington State's non-conference schedule included a trip to the Diamond Head Classic in Hawaii, where they would play three of the following: Auburn, BYU, Harvard, New Mexico, Northern Iowa, Oklahoma, and host-Hawaii. The Cougars would also host Gonzaga and UTEP.

Date time, TV	Opponent	Result	Record	Site (attendance) city, state
Exhibition
Oct. 30*; 8:00 pm	Lewis-Clark State	W 81–74	–	Beasley Coliseum (1,331); Pullman, Washington
Nov. 6*; 6:00 pm	Pacific (OR)	W 97–70	–	Bohler Gym (2,427); Pullman, Washington
Non-conference regular season
Nov. 13*; 5:30 pm, P12N	Northern Arizona	W 83–70	1–0	Beasley Coliseum (3,011); Pullman, Washington
Nov. 20*; 8:00 pm, P12N	Idaho State	W 85–67	2–0	Beasley Coliseum (2,662); Pullman, Washington
Nov. 24*; 8:00 pm, P12N	Cal State Los Angeles	W 74–57	3–0	Beasley Coliseum (1,280); Pullman, Washington
Nov. 28*; 6:00 pm, P12N	Texas Southern	W 77–65	4–0	Beasley Coliseum (1,604); Pullman, Washington
Dec. 2*; 8:00 pm, FS1	No. 13 Gonzaga	L 60–69	4–1	Beasley Coliseum (8,209); Pullman, Washington
Dec. 6*; 1:00 pm, P12N	Portland State	W 91–67	5–1	Beasley Coliseum (1,806); Pullman, Washington
Dec. 10*; 6:00 pm	at Idaho; Battle of the Palouse	L 74–78	5–2	Cowan Spectrum (3,759); Moscow, Idaho
Dec. 13*; 3:00 pm, P12N	UTEP	W 84–68	6–2	Beasley Coliseum (1,917); Pullman, Washington
Dec. 18*; 6:00 pm, P12N	Texas State	W 78–73 ^{OT}	7–2	Beasley Coliseum (1,233); Pullman, Washington
Dec. 22*; 8:00 pm, ESPNU	vs. No. 3 Oklahoma; Diamond Head Classic Quarterfinals	L 60–88	7–3	Stan Sheriff Center (8,436); Honolulu, Hawaii
Dec. 23*; 8:30 pm, ESPNU	vs. Northern Iowa; Diamond Head Classic Consolation Semifinals	L 59–63	7–4	Stan Sheriff Center (7,365); Honolulu, Hawaii
Dec. 25*; 10:00 am, ESPN3	vs. New Mexico; Diamond Head Classic 7th Place Game	W 82–59	8–4	Stan Sheriff Center (6,172); Honolulu, Hawaii
Pac-12 regular season
Jan. 1; 6:00 pm, P12N	USC	L 77–90	8–5 (0–1)	Beasley Coliseum (2,314); Pullman, Washington
Jan. 3; 6:30 pm, P12N	No. 25 UCLA	W 85–78	9–5 (1–1)	Beasley Coliseum (1,912); Pullman, Washington
Jan. 9; 12:00 pm, P12N	Washington; Rivalry	L 95–99 ^{OT}	9–6 (1–2)	Beasley Coliseum (4,025); Pullman, Washington
Jan. 14; 5:00 pm, P12N	at Arizona State	L 73–84	9–7 (1–3)	Wells Fargo Arena (5,047); Tempe, Arizona
Jan. 16; 6:30 pm, P12N	at No. 18 Arizona	L 66–90	9–8 (1–4)	McKale Center (14,502); Tucson, Arizona
Jan. 21; 8:00 pm, FS1	Utah	L 71–92	9–9 (1–5)	Beasley Coliseum (2,717); Pullman, Washington
Jan. 23; 6:00 pm, P12N	Colorado	L 70–75	9–10 (1–6)	Beasley Coliseum (3,321); Pullman, Washington
Jan. 28; 7:30 pm, P12N	at USC	L 71–81	9–11 (1–7)	Galen Center (4,392); Los Angeles, California
Jan. 30; 4:00 pm, P12N	at UCLA	L 50–83	9–12 (1–8)	Pauley Pavilion (9,024); Los Angeles, California
Feb. 3; 7:00 pm, P12N	No. 23 Arizona	L 64–79	9–13 (1–9)	Beasley Coliseum (3,189); Pullman, Washington
Feb. 6; 3:30 pm, P12N	Arizona State	L 55–67	9–14 (1–10)	Beasley Coliseum (3,448); Pullman, Washington
Feb. 11; 7:00 pm, P12N	at Colorado	L 81–88 ^{2OT}	9–15 (1–11)	Coors Events Center (7,330); Boulder, Colorado
Feb. 14; 12:00 pm, P12N	at Utah	L 47–88	9–16 (1–12)	Jon M. Huntsman Center (11,464); Salt Lake City, Utah
Feb. 18; 7:00 pm, P12N	Stanford	L 56–72	9–17 (1–13)	Beasley Coliseum (2,711); Pullman, Washington
Feb. 21; 5:30 pm, ESPNU	California	L 62–80	9–18 (1–14)	Beasley Coliseum (3,203); Pullman, Washington
Feb. 24; 7:00 pm, P12N	at No. 13 Oregon	L 62–76	9–19 (1–15)	Matthew Knight Arena (8,088); Eugene, Oregon
Feb. 28; 3:30 pm, P12N	at Oregon State	L 49–69	9–20 (1–16)	Gill Coliseum (9,604); Corvallis, Oregon
Mar. 2; 8:00 pm, ESPNU	at Washington; Rivalry	L 91–99	9–21 (1–17)	Alaska Airlines Arena (7,655); Seattle, Washington
Pac-12 Tournament
Mar. 9; 2:30 pm, P12N	vs. Colorado; First round	L 56–80	9–22	MGM Grand Garden Arena (12,916); Paradise, Nevada
*Non-conference game. ^{#}Rankings from AP Poll. (#) Tournament seedings in parentheses. All times are in Pacific Time.
