= 2015–16 Colorado Buffaloes men's basketball team =

American college basketball season

2015–16 Colorado Buffaloes men's basketball

NCAA tournament, First Round
- Conference: Pac-12 Conference
- Record: 22–12 (10–8 Pac-12)
- Head coach: Tad Boyle (6th season)
- Assistant coaches: Jean Prioleau; Mike Rhon; Rodney Billups
- Home arena: Coors Events Center

2015–16 Pac-12 Conference men's basketball standings
	Conf.				Overall
Team	W		L	PCT	W		L	PCT
No. 5 Oregon †	14	–	4	.778	31	–	7	.816
No. 13 Utah	13	–	5	.722	27	–	9	.750
No. 17 Arizona	12	–	6	.667	25	–	9	.735
No. 23 California	12	–	6	.667	23	–	11	.676
Colorado	10	–	8	.556	22	–	12	.647
USC	9	–	9	.500	21	–	13	.618
Oregon State	9	–	9	.500	19	–	13	.594
Washington	9	–	9	.500	19	–	15	.559
Stanford	8	–	10	.444	15	–	15	.500
UCLA	6	–	12	.333	15	–	17	.469
Arizona State	5	–	13	.278	15	–	17	.469
Washington State	1	–	17	.056	9	–	22	.290
† Pac-12 Tournament winner Rankings from AP poll

The 2015–16 Colorado Buffaloes men's basketball team represented the University of Colorado in the 2015–16 NCAA Division I men's basketball season. This was Tad Boyle's sixth season as head coach at Colorado. The Buffaloes played their home games at Coors Events Center in Boulder, Colorado and were members of the Pac-12 Conference. They finished the season 22–12, 10–8 in Pac-12 play to finish in fifth place. The defeated Washington State in the first round of the Pac-12 tournament to advance to the quarterfinals where they lost to Arizona. They received an at-large bid to the NCAA tournament where they lost in the first round to UConn.

== Previous season ==
The Buffaloes finished the season with an overall record of 16–18, and 7–11 in conference play. In the Pac-12 Tournament the Buffaloes defeated Oregon State in the First round before losing to Oregon in the quarterfinals. The team accepted an invitation to play in the CBI where they defeated Gardner–Webb in the First round, and lost to Seattle in the Second round.

== Off-season ==
=== Departures ===
Name	Number	Pos.	Height	Weight	Year	Hometown	Notes
Askia Booker	0	G	6'2"	175	Senior	Los Angeles, CA	Graduated
Kevin Nelson	12	G	6'2"	190	Senior	Albuquerque, NM	Graduated
Dustin Thomas	13	G/F	6'7"	225	Sophomore	Texarkana, TX	Transferred to Arkansas
Jaron Hopkins	23	G	6'6"	200	Sophomore	Mesa, AZ	Transferred to Fresno State
Geoffrey Bates	35	G	6'3"	200	RS Senior	Plano, TX	Graduated

=== Incoming transfers ===
Name	Number	Pos.	Height	Weight	Year	Hometown	Notes
Kenan Guzonjic	13	F	6'8"	215	Junior	Sarajevo, Bosnia and Herzegovina	Junior college transfer from Midland College
Derrick White	21	G	6'5"	185	Senior	Parker, Colorado	Transfer from University of Colorado Colorado Springs. Will have to sit out for the 2015–16 season under NCAA transfer rules.

=== 2015 recruiting class ===
College recruiting information
Name	Hometown	School	Height	Weight	Commit date
Thomas Akyazali; G	Antwerp, Belgium	Koninklijk Atheneum Deurne HS	6 ft 2 in (1.88 m)	190 lb (86 kg)	Mar 14, 2015
Thomas Akyazali; G	Recruit ratings: Scout: Rivals: 247Sports: ESPN:				
Overall recruit ranking:
Note: In many cases, Scout, Rivals, 247Sports, On3, and ESPN may conflict in their listings of height and weight.; In these cases, the average was taken. ESPN grades are on a 100-point scale.; Sources:

== Roster ==
2015–16 Colorado Buffaloes men's basketball team
Players
Coaches

Pos.	#	Name	Height	Weight	Year	Previous school	Hometown
G	0	Thomas Akyazali	6 ft 2 in (1.88 m)	180 lb (82 kg)	Fr	Koninklijk Atheneum Deurne HS	Antwerp, BE
F	1	Wesley Gordon	6 ft 9 in (2.06 m)	220 lb (100 kg)	RS Jr	Sierra HS	Colorado Springs, CO
G/F	2	Xavier Johnson (injured) (redshirt)	6 ft 7 in (2.01 m)	225 lb (102 kg)	Sr	Mater Dei HS	Los Angeles, CA
G	3	Xavier Talton	6 ft 2 in (1.88 m)	185 lb (84 kg)	Sr	Sterling HS	Sterling, CO
G	5	Eli Stalzer	6 ft 3 in (1.91 m)	195 lb (88 kg)	Sr	Mater Dei HS	Brea, CA
G/F	10	Tre'Shaun Fletcher	6 ft 7 in (2.01 m)	205 lb (93 kg)	Jr	Lincoln HS	Tacoma, WA
G	12	Mitch Lombard (W)	6 ft 0 in (1.83 m)	183 lb (83 kg)	Fr	Rock Canyon HS	Castle Pines, CO
F	13	Kenan Guzonjic	6 ft 8 in (2.03 m)	245 lb (111 kg)	So	Midland College	Sarajevo, BA
F	14	Tory Miller	6 ft 9 in (2.06 m)	246 lb (112 kg)	So	New Hampton School	Lee's Summit, MO
G	15	Dominique Collier	6 ft 2 in (1.88 m)	190 lb (86 kg)	So	East HS	Denver, CO
G	21	Derrick White (redshirt)	6 ft 5 in (1.96 m)	193 lb (88 kg)	Sr	Colorado Colorado Springs	Parker, CO
G	24	George King	6 ft 6 in (1.98 m)	220 lb (100 kg)	RS So	Brennan HS	San Antonio, TX
G	22	Brett Brady (W)	6 ft 1 in (1.85 m)	170 lb (77 kg)	Sr	Highlands Ranch HS	Highlands Ranch, CO
G	33	Josh Repine (W)	6 ft 3 in (1.91 m)	180 lb (82 kg)	So	New Hampton School	Englewood, CO
F	40	Josh Scott	6 ft 10 in (2.08 m)	245 lb (111 kg)	Sr	Lewis-Palmer HS	Monument, CO
G	44	Josh Fortune	6 ft 5 in (1.96 m)	200 lb (91 kg)	RS Jr	Providence	Hampton, VA

Head coach

- Tad Boyle (Kansas)

Assistant coach(es)

- Jean Prioleau (Fordham)
- Mike Rohn (McPherson)
- Rodney Billups (Denver)

Legend

- (C) Team captain
- (S) Suspended
- (I) Ineligible
- (W) Walk-on
- Injured
- Current redshirt

Roster
Last update: February 17, 2016

== Schedule ==
Date time, TV	Rank^{#}	Opponent^{#}	Result	Record	Site (attendance) city, state
Non-conference regular season
Nov 13, 2015*; 3:00 pm, ESPN2		vs. No. 7 Iowa State; Sanford Pentagon Opener	L 62–68	0–1	Sanford Pentagon (3,200); Sioux Falls, SD
Nov 17, 2015*; 1:00 pm, ESPN		at Auburn; College Hoops Tip-Off Marathon	W 91–84	1–1	Auburn Arena (7,241); Auburn, AL
Nov 20, 2015*; 7:00 pm, P12N		Portland	W 85–63	2–1	Coors Events Center (7,783); Boulder, CO
Nov 22, 2015*; 12:00 pm, P12N		Omaha	W 87–82	3–1	Coors Events Center (7,199); Boulder, CO
Nov 25, 2015*; 7:00 pm, P12N		Air Force	W 81–70	4–1	Coors Events Center (7,698); Boulder, CO
Nov 29, 2015*; 1:00 pm, P12N		Northern Colorado	W 82–52	5–1	Coors Events Center (7,424); Boulder, CO
Dec 2, 2015*; 6:00 pm, P12N		Fort Lewis	W 95–71	6–1	Coors Events Center (7,587); Boulder, CO
Dec 6, 2015*; 12:00 pm, RTRM		at Colorado State	W 88–77	7–1	Moby Arena (8,750); Fort Collins, CO
Dec 12, 2015*; 6:00 pm, P12N		BYU	W 92–83	8–1	Coors Events Center (8,913); Boulder, CO
Dec 18, 2015*; 7:00 pm, P12N		Nicholls State; Las Vegas Classic	W 85–68	9–1	Coors Events Center (8,185); Boulder, CO
Dec 19, 2015*; 7:00 pm, P12N		Hampton; Las Vegas Classic	W 95–53	10–1	Coors Events Center (8,177); Boulder, CO
Dec 22, 2015*; 8:30 pm		vs. Penn State; Las Vegas Classic semifinals	W 71–70	11–1	Orleans Arena; Paradise, NV
Dec 23, 2015*; 8:30 pm, FS1		vs. No. 18 SMU; Las Vegas Classic championship	L 66–70	11–2	Orleans Arena (2,154); Paradise, NV
Pac-12 regular season
Jan 1, 2016; 9:00 pm, P12N		at California	L 65–79	11–3 (0–1)	Haas Pavilion (9,964); Berkeley, CA
Jan 3, 2016; 8:00 pm, ESPNU		at Stanford	W 56–55	12–3 (1–1)	Maples Pavilion (3,887); Stanford, CA
Jan 8, 2016; 7:00 pm, FS1		Utah	L 54–56	12–4 (1–2)	Coors Events Center (8,701); Boulder, CO
Jan 13, 2016; 9:00 pm, ESPNU		Oregon State	W 71–54	13–4 (2–2)	Coors Events Center (9,190); Boulder, CO
Jan 17, 2016; 5:00 pm, P12N		Oregon	W 91–87	14–4 (3–2)	Coors Events Center (8,459); Boulder, CO
Jan 20, 2016; 8:00 pm, P12N		at Washington	L 83–95	14–5 (3–3)	Alaska Airlines Arena (6,325); Seattle, WA
Jan 23, 2016; 7:00 pm, P12N		at Washington State	W 75–70	15–5 (4–3)	Beasley Coliseum (3,321); Pullman, WA
Jan 27, 2016; 7:00 pm, P12N		Stanford	W 91–75	16–5 (5–3)	Coors Events Center (8,001); Boulder, CO
Jan 31, 2016; 3:00 pm, FS1		California	W 70–62	17–5 (6–3)	Coors Events Center (9,423); Boulder, CO
Feb 4, 2016; 7:00 pm, FS1		at No. 16 Oregon	L 56–76	17–6 (6–4)	Matthew Knight Arena (7,226); Eugene, OR
Feb 6, 2016; 6:30 pm, P12N		at Oregon State	L 56–60	17–7 (6–5)	Gill Coliseum (6,517); Corvallis, OR
Feb 11, 2016; 8:30 pm, P12N		Washington State	W 88–81 ^{2OT}	18–7 (7–5)	Coors Events Center (7,330); Boulder, CO
Feb 13, 2016; 12:00 pm, P12N		Washington	W 81–80	19–7 (8–5)	Coors Events Center (9,476); Boulder, CO
Feb 17, 2016; 9:00 pm, ESPNU		at USC	L 72–79	19–8 (8–6)	Galen Center (5,132); Los Angeles, CA
Feb 20, 2016; 9:00 pm, FS1		at UCLA	L 53–77	19–9 (8–7)	Pauley Pavilion (8,492); Los Angeles, CA
Feb 24, 2016; 7:00 pm, ESPN2		No. 9 Arizona	W 75–72	20–9 (9–7)	Coors Events Center (11,309); Boulder, CO
Feb 28, 2016; 2:30 pm, P12N		Arizona State	W 79–69	21–9 (10–7)	Coors Events Center (10,325); Boulder, CO
Mar 5, 2016; 7:30 pm, ESPNU		at No. 13 Utah	L 55–57	21–10 (10–8)	Jon M. Huntsman Center (15,000); Salt Lake City, UT
Pac-12 tournament
Mar 9, 2016; 3:30 pm, P12N	(5)	vs. (12) Washington State; First Round	W 80–56	22–10	MGM Grand Garden Arena (12,916); Paradise, NV
Mar 10, 2016; 3:30 pm, P12N	(5)	vs. (4) No. 15 Arizona; Quarterfinals	L 78–82	22–11	MGM Grand Garden Arena (12,916); Paradise, NV
NCAA tournament
Mar 17, 2016*; 11:30 AM, TNT	(8 S)	vs. (9 S) UConn; First Round	L 67–74	22–12	Wells Fargo Arena (16,628); Des Moines, IA
*Non-conference game. ^{#}Rankings from AP Poll. (#) Tournament seedings in parentheses. S=South Region. All times are in Mountain Time.

== See also ==
2015–16 Colorado Buffaloes women's basketball team
