= 2015–16 Stanford Cardinal men's basketball team =

American college basketball season

2015–16 Stanford Cardinal men's basketball
- Conference: Pac-12 Conference
- Record: 15–15 (8–10 Pac-12)
- Head coach: Johnny Dawkins (8th season)
- Assistant coaches: Tim O'Toole; Charles Payne; Mike Scharge
- Home arena: Maples Pavilion

2015–16 Pac-12 Conference men's basketball standings
	Conf.				Overall
Team	W		L	PCT	W		L	PCT
No. 5 Oregon †	14	–	4	.778	31	–	7	.816
No. 13 Utah	13	–	5	.722	27	–	9	.750
No. 17 Arizona	12	–	6	.667	25	–	9	.735
No. 23 California	12	–	6	.667	23	–	11	.676
Colorado	10	–	8	.556	22	–	12	.647
USC	9	–	9	.500	21	–	13	.618
Oregon State	9	–	9	.500	19	–	13	.594
Washington	9	–	9	.500	19	–	15	.559
Stanford	8	–	10	.444	15	–	15	.500
UCLA	6	–	12	.333	15	–	17	.469
Arizona State	5	–	13	.278	15	–	17	.469
Washington State	1	–	17	.056	9	–	22	.290
† Pac-12 Tournament winner Rankings from AP poll

The 2015–16 Stanford Cardinal men's basketball team represented Stanford University during the 2015–16 NCAA Division I men's basketball season. The Cardinal were led by eighth year head coach Johnny Dawkins. They played their home games at Maples Pavilion and were members of the Pac-12 Conference. They finished the season 15–15, 8–10 in Pac-12 play to finish in ninth place. They lost in the first round of the Pac-12 tournament to Washington.

On March 14, head coach Johnny Dawkins was fired. He finished at Stanford with an eight-year record of 156–115, two NIT championships, but only one NCAA Tournament appearance.

== Previous season ==
The 2014–15 Stanford Cardinal basketball team finished the season with an overall record of 24–13, and 9–9 in conference play. The Cardinal made it to the Quarterfinals of the Pac-12 tournament. The team was invited to the 2015 National Invitation Tournament as a 2-seed. Stanford defeated Miami (FL) 66–64 in the Championship game.

== Off-season ==
=== Departures ===
Name	Number	Pos.	Height	Weight	Year	Hometown	Notes
Stefan Nastić	4	C	6'11"	245	RS Senior	Thornhill, Ontario	Graduated
Elliott Bullock	44	PF	6'10"	235	RS Senior	Salt Lake City, Utah	Graduated
Anthony Brown	21	SF	6'6"	215	RS Senior	Fountain Valley, California	Graduated/2015 NBA draft
Jack Ryan	14	SF	6'8"	210	Senior	Glenview, Illinois	Graduated
Chasson Randle	5	G	6'2"	185	Senior	Rock Island, Illinois	Graduated
Wade Morgan	20	PG	6'1"	175	Senior	South Orange, New Jersey	Graduated

=== 2015 recruiting class ===
College recruiting information
Name	Hometown	School	Height	Weight	Commit date
Marcus Sheffield #32 SF	Alpharetta, GA	Chattahoochee High School	6 ft 5 in (1.96 m)	180 lb (82 kg)	Jul 8, 2014
Marcus Sheffield #32 SF	Recruit ratings: Scout: Rivals: 247Sports: ESPN:				
Cameron Walker #68 SF	Santa Maria, CA	Ernest Righetti High School	6 ft 7 in (2.01 m)	190 lb (86 kg)	Jul 21, 2014
Cameron Walker #68 SF	Recruit ratings: Scout: Rivals: 247Sports: ESPN:				
Josh Sharma #13 C	Lexington, MA	Northfield Mount Hermon School	6 ft 11 in (2.11 m)	210 lb (95 kg)	Oct 22, 2014
Josh Sharma #13 C	Recruit ratings: Scout: Rivals: 247Sports: ESPN:				
Overall recruit ranking:
Note: In many cases, Scout, Rivals, 247Sports, On3, and ESPN may conflict in their listings of height and weight.; In these cases, the average was taken. ESPN grades are on a 100-point scale.; Sources: "2015 Stanford Basketball Commitment List". Rivals.; "2015 Stanford Cardinal Player Commits". ESPN.; "2015 Team Ranking". Rivals.

== Roster ==
2015–16 Stanford Cardinal men's basketball team
Players
Coaches

Pos.	#	Name	Height	Weight	Year	Previous school	Hometown
G	1	Christian Sanders	6 ft 4 in (1.93 m)	192 lb (87 kg)	RS Jr	St. Thomas HS	Houston, Texas
G	2	Robert Cartwright	6 ft 2 in (1.88 m)	180 lb (82 kg)	So	Flintridge Prep	Pasadena, California
G	3	Malcolm Allen	6 ft 1 in (1.85 m)	180 lb (82 kg)	Jr	Centennial HS	Las Vegas, Nevada
G	4	Ian Proulx (W)	6 ft 1 in (1.85 m)	185 lb (84 kg)	Sr	Menlo-Atherton HS	Atherton, California
F	10	Michael Humphrey	6 ft 9 in (2.06 m)	220 lb (100 kg)	So	Sunnyslope HS	Phoenix, Arizona
G/F	11	Dorain Pickens	6 ft 5 in (1.96 m)	215 lb (98 kg)	So	Pinnacle HS	Phoenix, Arizona
G	12	Josh Hanson (W)	6 ft 1 in (1.85 m)	175 lb (79 kg)	So	St. John's School	Houston, Texas
G/F	14	Marcus Sheffield	6 ft 5 in (1.96 m)	180 lb (82 kg)	Fr	Chattahoochee HS	(Georgia (country)) Alpharetta, Georgia
G	15	Marcus Allen	6 ft 3 in (1.91 m)	190 lb (86 kg)	Jr	Centennial HS	Las Vegas, Nevada
C	20	Josh Sharma	7 ft 0 in (2.13 m)	220 lb (100 kg)	Fr	Northfield Mount Hermon	Lexington, Massachusetts
F	21	Cameron Walker	6 ft 7 in (2.01 m)	200 lb (91 kg)	Fr	Righetti HS	Santa Maria, California
F	22	Reid Travis (injured) (redshirt)	6 ft 8 in (2.03 m)	245 lb (111 kg)	So	DeLaSalle HS	Minneapolis, Minnesota
F	24	Alex Seutin (W)	6 ft 5 in (1.96 m)	207 lb (94 kg)	So	International HS	San Francisco, California
F	25	Rosco Allen	6 ft 9 in (2.06 m)	220 lb (100 kg)	RS Jr	Bishop Gorman HS	Budapest, Hungary
C	30	Grant Verhoeven	6 ft 9 in (2.06 m)	250 lb (113 kg)	Sr	Central Valley Christian HS	Hanford, California
G	31	Ayo Adedeji (W)	6 ft 4 in (1.93 m)	195 lb (88 kg)	Jr	Damien HS	San Dimas, California

Head coach

- Johnny Dawkins (Duke)

Assistant coach(es)

- Tim O'Toole (Fairfield)
- Charles Payne (FIU)
- Mike Schrage (Indiana)

Legend

- (C) Team captain
- (S) Suspended
- (I) Ineligible
- (W) Walk-on
- Injured
- Current redshirt

Roster
Last update: February 7, 2016

=== Notes ===
- Dec. 19, 2015 – Sophomore forward Reid Travis out indefinitely with a left leg injury.
  On Feb. 23 it was announced Travis would medically redshirt and miss the remainder of the season.

== Schedule ==
Date time, TV	Opponent	Result	Record	Site (attendance) city, state
Non-conference regular season
Nov 13, 2015*; 6:00 pm, P12N	Green Bay; NIT Season Tip-Off	W 93–89 ^{OT}	1–0	Maples Pavilion (3,783); Stanford, CA
Nov 15, 2015*; 5:00 pm, P12N	Charleston Southern; NIT Season Tip-Off	W 93–59	2–0	Maples Pavilion (3,427); Stanford, CA
Nov 19, 2015*; 8:30 pm, ESPN2	SMU	L 70–85	2–1	Maples Pavilion (3,687); Stanford, CA
Nov 22, 2015*; 8:00 pm, ESPNU	at Saint Mary's	L 61–78	2–2	McKeon Pavilion (3,500); Moraga, CA
Nov 26, 2015*; 1:30 pm, ESPN2	vs. No. 8 Villanova; NIT Season Tip-Off Semifinals	L 45–59	2–3	Barclays Center; Brooklyn, NY
Nov 27, 2015*; 9:30 am, ESPNU	vs. Arkansas; NIT Season Tip-Off Consolation	W 69–66	3–3	Barclays Center; Brooklyn, NY
Dec 12, 2015*; 7:00 pm, P12N	Dartmouth	W 64–50	4–3	Maples Pavilion (4,452); Stanford, CA
Dec 15, 2015*; 7:00 pm, FS1	DePaul	W 79–60	5–3	Maples Pavilion (4,912); Stanford, CA
Dec 19, 2015*; 8:30 pm, ESPN2	Texas	L 73–75	5–4	Maples Pavilion (3,930); Stanford, CA
Dec 21, 2015*; 8:00 pm, P12N	Sacramento State	W 70–60	6–4	Maples Pavilion (3,436); Stanford, CA
Dec 27, 2015*; 6:00 pm, P12N	Carroll (Montana)	W 83–38	7–4	Maples Pavilion (3,607); Stanford, CA
Pac-12 regular season
Jan 1, 2016; 6:00 pm, ESPNU	No. 21 Utah	W 70–68 ^{OT}	8–4 (1–0)	Maples Pavilion (4,065); Stanford, CA
Jan 3, 2016; 7:00 pm, ESPNU	Colorado	L 55–56	8–5 (1–1)	Maples Pavilion (3,887); Stanford, CA
Jan 6, 2016; 8:00 pm, ESPNU	at Oregon State	W 78–72	9–5 (2–1)	Gill Coliseum (5,563); Corvallis, OR
Jan 10, 2016; 7:00 pm, ESPNU	at Oregon	L 58–71	9–6 (2–2)	Matthew Knight Arena (7,318); Eugene, OR
Jan 14, 2016; 8:00 pm, FS1	California	W 77–71	10–6 (3–2)	Maples Pavilion (5,023); Stanford, CA
Jan 21, 2016; 8:00 pm, P12N	No. 12 Arizona	L 57–71	10–7 (3–3)	Maples Pavilion (5,275); Stanford, CA
Jan 23, 2016; 8:00 pm, P12N	Arizona State	W 75–73	11–7 (4–3)	Maples Pavilion (4,776); Stanford, CA
Jan 27, 2016; 6:00 pm, P12N	at Colorado	L 75–91	11–8 (4–4)	Coors Events Center (8,001); Boulder, CO
Jan 30, 2016; 2:00 pm, P12N	at Utah	L 74–96	11–9 (4–5)	Jon M. Huntsman Center (14,109); Salt Lake City, UT
Feb 6, 2016; 1:00 pm, ESPN2	at California	L 61–76	11–10 (4–6)	Haas Pavilion (11,858); Berkeley, CA
Feb 11, 2016; 8:00 pm, FS1	Oregon State	L 50–62	11–11 (4–7)	Maples Pavilion (4,519); Stanford, CA
Feb 13, 2016; 1:00 pm, P12N	No. 11 Oregon	W 76–72	12–11 (5–7)	Maples Pavilion (5,462); Stanford, CA
Feb 18, 2016; 7:00 pm, P12N	at Washington State	W 72–56	13–11 (6–7)	Beasley Coliseum (2,711); Pullman, WA
Feb 20, 2016; 5:00 pm, P12N	at Washington	L 53–64	13–12 (6–8)	Alaska Airlines Arena (9,161); Seattle, WA
Feb 25, 2016; 8:00 pm, P12N	USC	W 84–64	14–12 (7–8)	Maples Pavilion (4,080); Stanford, CA
Feb 27, 2016; 1:30 pm, FOX	UCLA	W 79–70	15–12 (8–8)	Maples Pavilion (6,364); Stanford, CA
Mar 3, 2016; 8:00 pm, FS1	at Arizona State	L 64–74	15–13 (8–9)	Wells Fargo Arena (5,157); Tucson, AZ
Mar 5, 2016; 1:00 pm, CBS	at No. 18 Arizona	L 62–94	15–14 (8–10)	McKale Center (14,644); Tucson, AZ
Pac-12 tournament
Mar 9, 2016; 12:00 pm, P12N	vs. Washington; First round	L 68–91	15–15	MGM Grand Garden Arena (12,916); Paradise, NV
*Non-conference game. ^{#}Rankings from AP Poll. (#) Tournament seedings in parentheses. All times are in Pacific Time.
