= 2015–16 Arizona State Sun Devils men's basketball team =

American college basketball season

2015–16 Arizona State Sun Devils men's basketball
- Conference: Pac-12 Conference
- Record: 15–17 (5–13 Pac–12)
- Head coach: Bobby Hurley (1st season)
- Assistant coaches: Levi Watkins; Rashon Bruno; Brian Merritt
- Home arena: Wells Fargo Arena

2015–16 Pac-12 Conference men's basketball standings
| | Conf. | | | | Overall |
| Team | W | | L | PCT | W | | L | PCT |
|---|---|---|---|---|---|---|---|---|
| No. 5 Oregon † | 14 | – | 4 | .778 | 31 | – | 7 | .816 |
| No. 13 Utah | 13 | – | 5 | .722 | 27 | – | 9 | .750 |
| No. 17 Arizona | 12 | – | 6 | .667 | 25 | – | 9 | .735 |
| No. 23 California | 12 | – | 6 | .667 | 23 | – | 11 | .676 |
| Colorado | 10 | – | 8 | .556 | 22 | – | 12 | .647 |
| USC | 9 | – | 9 | .500 | 21 | – | 13 | .618 |
| Oregon State | 9 | – | 9 | .500 | 19 | – | 13 | .594 |
| Washington | 9 | – | 9 | .500 | 19 | – | 15 | .559 |
| Stanford | 8 | – | 10 | .444 | 15 | – | 15 | .500 |
| UCLA | 6 | – | 12 | .333 | 15 | – | 17 | .469 |
| Arizona State | 5 | – | 13 | .278 | 15 | – | 17 | .469 |
| Washington State | 1 | – | 17 | .056 | 9 | – | 22 | .290 |
† Pac-12 Tournament winner Rankings from AP poll

The 2015–16 Arizona State Sun Devils men's basketball team represented Arizona State University during the 2015–16 NCAA Division I men's basketball season. The Sun Devils were led by first year head coach Bobby Hurley and played their home games at Wells Fargo Arena in Tempe, Arizona. They were members of Pac–12 Conference. They finished the season 15–17, 5–13 in Pac-12 play to finish in 11th place. They lost in the first round of the Pac-12 tournament to Oregon State.

== Previous season ==
The Sun Devils finished the 2014–15 season with a record of 18–16, and 9–9 in the Pac-12 play. In the Pac-12 tournament, the Sun Devils lost to USC in the first round. They received an at-large bid to the NIT, where they defeated UConn in the first round before losing in the second round to Richmond.

== Off-season ==
=== Departures ===
| Name | Number | Pos. | Height | Weight | Year | Hometown | Notes |
|---|---|---|---|---|---|---|---|
| Jonathan Gilling | 31 | F | 6'8" | 220 | Senior | Rungsted Kyst, Denmark | Graduated |
| Bo Barnes | 33 | G | 6'4" | 190 | Senior | Scottsdale, AZ | Graduated |
| Shaquielle McKissic | 40 | F/G | 6'5" | 200 | Senior | Seattle, WA | Graduated |
| Roosevelt Scott | 1 | G | 6'3" | 180 | Junior | Saint Paul, MN | Transferred to University of Central Missouri |
| Sai Tummala | 24 | F | 6'6" | 218 | Junior | Phoenix, AZ | Transferred to University of Hawaii at Manoa |
| Chance Murray | 3 | G | 6'2" | 180 | Sophomore | Los Angeles, CA | Transferred to Carson–Newman University |
| Connor MacDougall | 55 | C/F | 6'8" | 220 | Freshman | Scottsdale, AZ | Transferred to South Mountain Community College |

=== Incoming transfers ===
| Name | Number | Pos. | Height | Weight | Year | Hometown | Notes |
|---|---|---|---|---|---|---|---|
| Maurice O'Field | 1 | SG | | | Junior | Cleveland, OH | Junior college transfer from Midland College. |
| Shannon Evans | 3 | PG | 6'1" | 170 | Junior | Suffolk, VA | Elected to transfer from Buffalo. Will sit out the 2015–16 season because of NCAA transfer rules. He will have two years of eligibility. |
| Obinna Oleka | 5 | F | 6'8" | 225 | Junior | Washington, D.C. | Junior college transfer from Cecil College. |
| Andre Spight | 24 | SG | 6'3" | 175 | Junior | Pasadena, CA | Junior college transfer from South Plains College. |

=== 2015 recruiting class ===
College recruiting information
| Name | Hometown | School | Height | Weight | Commit date |
|---|---|---|---|---|---|
| | | | N/A | N/A | |
Recruit ratings: No ratings found
Overall recruit ranking:
Note: In many cases, Scout, Rivals, 247Sports, On3, and ESPN may conflict in their listings of height and weight.; In these cases, the average was taken. ESPN grades are on a 100-point scale.; Sources: "2015 Arizona St. Commitment List". Rivals.; "Arizona St. 2015 Basketball Commits". ESPN.; "2015 Team Ranking". Rivals.

== Roster ==
2015–16 Arizona State Sun Devils men's basketball team
Players
Coaches

| Pos. | # | Name | Height | Weight | Year | Previous school | Hometown |
|---|---|---|---|---|---|---|---|
| G | 0 | Tra Holder | 6 ft 1 in (1.85 m) | 180 lb (82 kg) | So | Brentwood School | Los Angeles, California |
| G/F | 1 | Maurice O'Field (S) | 6 ft 5 in (1.96 m) | 210 lb (95 kg) | Jr | Midland College | Cleveland, Ohio |
| F | 2 | Willie Atwood | 6 ft 7 in (2.01 m) | 215 lb (98 kg) | Sr | Connors State College | Memphis, Tennessee |
| G | 3 | Shannon Evans (redshirt) | 6 ft 1 in (1.85 m) | 160 lb (73 kg) | Jr | Buffalo | Suffolk, Virginia |
| G | 4 | Gerry Blakes | 6 ft 4 in (1.93 m) | 195 lb (88 kg) | Sr | San Bernardino Valley College | Inglewood, California |
| F | 5 | Obinna Oleka | 6 ft 7 in (2.01 m) | 225 lb (102 kg) | Jr | Cecil C.C. | (Washington, D.C.) Washington, D.C. |
| G | 10 | Torian Graham (S) (redshirt) | 6 ft 4 in (1.93 m) | 180 lb (82 kg) | Jr | Chipola College | Durham, North Carolina |
| F | 11 | Savon Goodman | 6 ft 6 in (1.98 m) | 220 lb (100 kg) | Jr | Indian Hills C.C. | Philadelphia, Pennsylvania |
| F | 12 | Andre Adams (injured) (redshirt) | 6 ft 9 in (2.06 m) | 216 lb (98 kg) | Fr | IMG Academy | Avondale, Arizona |
| F | 21 | Eric Jacobsen | 6 ft 10 in (2.08 m) | 240 lb (109 kg) | Sr | Hamilton HS | Chandler, Arizona |
| G | 22 | Austin Witherill (W) | 6 ft 0 in (1.83 m) | 160 lb (73 kg) | So | Highland HS | Gilbert, Arizona |
| G | 34 | Tyler Harris | 6 ft 5 in (1.96 m) | 200 lb (91 kg) | Fr | Oaks Christian School | Westlake Village, California |
| G | 44 | Kodi Justice | 6 ft 5 in (1.96 m) | 190 lb (86 kg) | So | Dobson HS | Mesa, Arizona |

Head coach

- Bobby Hurley (Duke)

Assistant coach(es)

- Levi Watkins (NC State)
- Rashon Bruno (DePaul)
- Brian Merritt (Towson)

Legend

- (C) Team captain
- (S) Suspended
- (I) Ineligible
- (W) Walk-on
- Injured
- Current redshirt

Roster
Last update: October 7, 2015

- Sept. 9, 2015 – Freshman forward, Andre Adams to miss entire season due to a torn ACL in his left knee.
- Feb. 23, 2016 – Junior Andre Spight left team with four games left in the season and intends to transfer.

== Schedule ==
| Date time, TV | Opponent | Result | Record | Site (attendance) city, state |
Exhibition
| Nov. 7*; 1:00 PM | Western New Mexico | W 102–34 | – | Wells Fargo Arena; Tempe, AZ |
Non-conference regular season
| Nov. 13*; 5:30 PM, P12N | Sacramento State | L 63–66 | 0–1 | Wells Fargo Arena (5,275); Tempe, AZ |
| Nov. 16*; 8:00 PM, P12N | Belmont; Legends Classic Regional Round | W 83–74 | 1–1 | Wells Fargo Arena (4,549); Tempe, AZ |
| Nov. 18*; 6:30 PM, P12N | Kennesaw State; Legends Classic Regional Round | W 91–53 | 2–1 | Wells Fargo Arena (4,197); Tempe, AZ |
| Nov. 23*; 7:30 PM, ESPN3 | vs. NC State; Legends Classic Semifinals | W 79–76 | 3–1 | Barclays Center (5,775); Brooklyn, NY |
| Nov. 24*; 6:00 PM, ESPN2 | vs. Marquette; Legends Classic Championship | L 73–78 ^{OT} | 3–2 | Barclays Center (4,777); Brooklyn, NY |
| Nov. 29*; 3:00 PM, P12N | UC Santa Barbara | W 70–68 | 4–2 | Wells Fargo Arena (4,026); Tempe, AZ |
| Dec. 2*; 7:00 PM, CBSSN | at Creighton | W 79–77 | 5–2 | CenturyLink Center Omaha (16,282); Omaha, NE |
| Dec. 5*; 8:30 PM, ESPN2 | No. 18 Texas A&M | W 67–54 | 6–2 | Wells Fargo Arena (7,608); Tempe, AZ |
| Dec. 12*; 1:15 PM, ESPN | at No. 5 Kentucky | L 58–72 | 6–3 | Rupp Arena (23,665); Lexington, KY |
| Dec. 16*; 8:00 PM, CBSSN | at UNLV | W 66–56 | 7–3 | Thomas & Mack Center (13,014); Paradise, NV |
| Dec. 19*; 12:30 PM, P12N | Houston Baptist | W 98–79 | 8–3 | Wells Fargo Arena (4,573); Tempe, AZ |
| Dec. 22*; 1:00 PM, P12N | Stephen F. Austin | W 80–73 | 9–3 | Wells Fargo Arena (4,373); Tempe, AZ |
| Dec. 28*; 7:00 PM, P12N | Cal State Bakersfield | W 75–59 | 10–3 | Wells Fargo Arena (6,625); Tempe, AZ |
Pac-12 Regular Season
| Jan. 3; 12:00 PM, FS1 | No. 8 Arizona; Territorial Cup Series | L 82–94 | 10–4 (0–1) | Wells Fargo Arena (8,044); Tempe, AZ |
| Jan. 7; 8:30 PM, P12N | at USC | L 65–75 | 10–5 (0–2) | Galen Center (2,754); Los Angeles, CA |
| Jan. 9; 3:30 PM, P12N | at UCLA | L 74–81 | 10–6 (0–3) | Pauley Pavilion (9,973); Los Angeles, CA |
| Jan. 14; 6:00 PM, P12N | Washington State | W 84–73 | 11–6 (1–3) | Wells Fargo Arena (5,047); Tempe, AZ |
| Jan. 16; 5:00 PM, P12N | Washington | L 85–89 | 11–7 (1–4) | Wells Fargo Arena (5,652); Tempe, AZ |
| Jan. 21; 7:00 PM, FS1 | at California | L 70–75 | 11–8 (1–5) | Haas Pavilion (9,096); Berkeley, CA |
| Jan. 23; 9:00 PM, P12N | at Stanford | L 73–75 | 11–9 (1–6) | Maples Pavilion (4,776); Stanford, CA |
| Jan. 28; 6:30 PM, P12N | Oregon State | W 86–68 | 12–9 (2–6) | Wells Fargo Arena (6,074); Tempe, AZ |
| Jan. 31; 6:30 PM, ESPNU | No. 23 Oregon | L 74–91 | 12–10 (2–7) | Wells Fargo Arena (6,760); Tempe, AZ |
| Feb. 3; 9:00 PM, ESPNU | at Washington | L 83–95 ^{OT} | 12–11 (2–8) | Alaska Airlines Arena (6,533); Seattle, WA |
| Feb. 6; 4:30 PM, P12N | at Washington State | W 67–55 | 13–11 (3–8) | Beasley Coliseum (3,448); Pullman, WA |
| Feb. 12; 6:00 PM, P12N | No. 23 USC | W 74–67 | 14–11 (4–8) | Wells Fargo Arena (7,772); Tempe, AZ |
| Feb. 14; 6:30 PM, ESPNU | UCLA | L 65–78 | 14–12 (4–9) | Wells Fargo Arena (6,710); Tempe, AZ |
| Feb. 17; 7:00 PM, ESPN2 | at No. 12 Arizona; Territorial Cup Series | L 61–99 | 14–13 (4–10) | McKale Center (14,644); Tucson, AZ |
| Feb. 25; 7:00 PM, P12N | at No. 22 Utah | L 46–81 | 14–14 (4–11) | Jon M. Huntsman Center (12,523); Salt Lake City, UT |
| Feb. 28; 2:30 PM, P12N | at Colorado | L 69–79 | 14–15 (4–12) | Coors Events Center (10,325); Boulder, CO |
| Mar. 3; 9:00 PM, FS1 | Stanford | W 74–64 | 15–15 (5–12) | Wells Fargo Arena (5,157); Tempe, AZ |
| Mar. 5; 6:00 PM, ESPN2 | No. 25 California | L 65–68 | 15–16 (5–13) | Wells Fargo Arena (6,276); Tempe, AZ |
Pac-12 tournament
| Mar 9; 9:30 PM, P12N | vs. Oregon State; First round | L 66–75 | 15–17 | MGM Grand Garden Arena (12,916); Paradise, NV |
*Non-conference game. ^{#}Rankings from AP Poll. (#) Tournament seedings in parentheses. All times are in Mountain Time.

== See also ==
2015–16 Arizona State Sun Devils women's basketball team
