= 2015–16 Oregon Ducks men's basketball team =

American college basketball season

2015–16 Oregon Ducks men's basketball

Pac-12 regular season & tournament champions

NCAA tournament, Elite Eight
- Conference: Pac-12 Conference

Ranking
- Coaches: No. 6
- AP: No. 5
- Record: 31–7 (14–4 Pac-12)
- Head coach: Dana Altman (6th season)
- Assistant coaches: Kevin McKenna; Tony Stubblefield; Mike Mennenga
- Home arena: Matthew Knight Arena

2015–16 Pac-12 Conference men's basketball standings
	Conf.				Overall
Team	W		L	PCT	W		L	PCT
No. 5 Oregon †	14	–	4	.778	31	–	7	.816
No. 13 Utah	13	–	5	.722	27	–	9	.750
No. 17 Arizona	12	–	6	.667	25	–	9	.735
No. 23 California	12	–	6	.667	23	–	11	.676
Colorado	10	–	8	.556	22	–	12	.647
USC	9	–	9	.500	21	–	13	.618
Oregon State	9	–	9	.500	19	–	13	.594
Washington	9	–	9	.500	19	–	15	.559
Stanford	8	–	10	.444	15	–	15	.500
UCLA	6	–	12	.333	15	–	17	.469
Arizona State	5	–	13	.278	15	–	17	.469
Washington State	1	–	17	.056	9	–	22	.290
† Pac-12 Tournament winner Rankings from AP poll

The 2015–16 Oregon Ducks men's basketball team represented the University of Oregon during the 2015–16 NCAA Division I men's basketball season. The Ducks were led by sixth-year head coach Dana Altman. They played their home games at Matthew Knight Arena and were members of the Pac–12 Conference. They finished the season 31–7, 14–4 in Pac-12 play to win the Pac-12 regular season championship. They defeated Washington, Arizona and Utah to be champions of the Pac-12 tournament. They received the conference's automatic bid to the NCAA tournament, where they defeated Holy Cross, Saint Joseph's, and Duke to advance to the Elite Eight, where they lost to Oklahoma.

== Previous season ==
The 2014–15 Oregon Ducks finished the season with an overall record of 26–10, and 13–5 in the Pac-12. In the Pac–12 Tournament, the Ducks made it to the championship game, where they lost to Arizona, 80–52. They received an at-large bid to the NCAA tournament as an 8-seed in the West Region. They defeated Oklahoma State in the second round before losing to Wisconsin in the round of 32.

== Off-season ==
=== Departures ===
Name	Number	Pos.	Height	Weight	Year	Hometown	Reason for departure
Joe Young	3	G	6'2"	180	RS senior	Houston, TX	Graduated/2015 NBA draft
Ahmaad Rorie	14	G	6'1"	175	Freshman	Tacoma, WA	Transferred to Montana
Jalil Abdul-Bassit	15	G	6'4"	197	Senior	Anchorage, AK	Graduated
Michael Chandler	25	C	6'10"	240	Junior	Indianapolis, IN	Transferred to Waldorf College
Tim Jensen	32	F	6'6"	225	RS senior	Manistee, MI	Graduated
Anthony Piganelli	35	G	6'4"	195	Senior	Oakland, CA	Graduated

=== Incoming transfers ===
Name	Number	Pos.	Height	Weight	Year	Hometown	Notes
Chris Boucher	25	F	6'10"	200	Junior	Montreal, Quebec	National Junior College Player of the Year at Northwest College
Dylan Ennis	31	G	6'2"	192	RS senior	Brampton, Ontario	Elected to transfer from Villanova. Ennis was eligible to play immediately.

=== 2015 recruiting class ===
College recruiting
Name	Hometown	School	Height	Weight	Commit date
Kendall Small; PG	Anaheim, CA	Mayfair HS	6 ft 0 in (1.83 m)	170 lb (77 kg)	Apr 29, 2014
Kendall Small; PG	Recruit ratings: Scout: Rivals: 247Sports: ESPN:				
Trevor Manuel; PF	Lansing, MI	Everett HS	6 ft 9 in (2.06 m)	200 lb (91 kg)	Sep 11, 2014
Trevor Manuel; PF	Recruit ratings: Scout: Rivals: 247Sports: ESPN:				
Tyler Dorsey; SG	Pasadena, CA	Maranatha HS	6 ft 4 in (1.93 m)	180 lb (82 kg)	Feb 2, 2015
Tyler Dorsey; SG	Recruit ratings: Scout: Rivals: 247Sports: ESPN:				
Overall recruit ranking:
Note: In many cases, Scout, Rivals, 247Sports, On3, and ESPN may conflict in their listings of height and weight.; In these cases, the average was taken. ESPN grades are on a 100-point scale.; Sources: "2015 Player Commits". ESPN.; "2015 Team Ranking". Rivals.

== Roster ==
2015–16 Oregon Ducks men's basketball team
Players
Coaches

Pos.	#	Name	Height	Weight	Year	Hometown
F	0	Dwayne Benjamin	6 ft 7 in (2.01 m)	210 lb (95 kg)	Sr	Lafayette, Louisiana
F	1	Jordan Bell	6 ft 9 in (2.06 m)	225 lb (102 kg)	So	Long Beach, California
G	2	Casey Benson	6 ft 3 in (1.91 m)	185 lb (84 kg)	So	Tempe, Arizona
G	4	Max Heller	5 ft 11 in (1.8 m)	170 lb (77 kg)	RS Sr	Del Mar, California
G	5	Tyler Dorsey	6 ft 4 in (1.93 m)	180 lb (82 kg)	Fr	Pasadena, California
G	10	Charlie Noebel (W)	6 ft 2 in (1.88 m)	178 lb (81 kg)	Jr	Irvine, California
G	11	Phil Richmond (W)	6 ft 4 in (1.93 m)	190 lb (86 kg)	RS Jr	Calabasas, California
G	21	Kendall Small	6 ft 0 in (1.83 m)	175 lb (79 kg)	Fr	Anaheim, California
F	23	Elgin Cook	6 ft 6 in (1.98 m)	205 lb (93 kg)	RS Sr	Milwaukee, Wisconsin
F	24	Dillon Brooks	6 ft 6 in (1.98 m)	225 lb (102 kg)	So	Mississauga, Ontario
F	25	Chris Boucher	6 ft 10 in (2.08 m)	190 lb (86 kg)	Jr	Montreal, Quebec
G	31	Dylan Ennis (injured)	6 ft 2 in (1.88 m)	195 lb (88 kg)	RS Sr	Brampton, Ontario
F	41	Roman Sorkin	6 ft 10 in (2.08 m)	225 lb (102 kg)	So	Ashdod, Israel

Head coach

- Dana Altman (Eastern New Mexico)

Assistant coach(es)

- Kevin McKenna (Creighton)
- Tony Stubblefield (Omaha)
- Mike Mennenga (Morehead State)

Legend

- (C) Team captain
- (S) Suspended
- (I) Ineligible
- (W) Walk-on
- Injured
- Current redshirt

Roster
Last update: February 8, 2016

Roster notes

- January 5, 2016 – Freshman Trevor Manuel asked for release and would transfer.
- January 6, 2016 – Redshirt Senior Dylan Ennis would miss the rest of the season due to a foot injury.
- March 16, 2016 – Oregon announced that the NCAA had awarded senior Chris Boucher an extra year of eligibility. In the Quebec educational system, students complete high school a year earlier than in the rest of North America, and normally attend a pre-university school known as a CEGEP. After Boucher's final year of high school in 2010–11, he did not academically qualify for CEGEP, and was out of school in 2011–12 before attending a prep school in Alma, Quebec for 2012–13 and playing 13 games in that season (considerably fewer that a typical U.S. prep school schedule). The NCAA initially treated the end of his final year of high school as his graduation date and his prep school year as his first year of college competition. Oregon applied for a waiver from the NCAA, citing serious family hardship during Boucher's high school years, the abbreviated nature of his prep school basketball season, and his satisfactory academic progress at Oregon.

== Schedule ==
Date time, TV	Rank^{#}	Opponent^{#}	Result	Record	Site (attendance) city, state
Exhibition
Nov. 3*; 7:00 pm, P12N		Northwest Christian	W 92–44	–	Matthew Knight Arena (5,499); Eugene, OR
Nov. 8*; 6:00 pm, P12N		Southern Oregon	W 91–40	–	Matthew Knight Arena (5,623); Eugene, OR
Non-conference regular season
Nov. 13*; 7:00 pm, P12N		Jackson State; Global Sports Shootout	W 80–52	1–0	Matthew Knight Arena (5,577); Eugene, OR
Nov. 16*; 8:30 pm, ESPN2	No. 25	No. 20 Baylor; College Hoops Tip-Off Marathon/ Global Sports Shootout	W 74–67	2–0	Matthew Knight Arena (7,718); Eugene, OR
Nov. 20*; 8:00 pm, P12N	No. 25	Savannah State; Global Sports Shootout	W 77–59	3–0	Matthew Knight Arena (6,465); Eugene, OR
Nov. 22*; 3:00 pm, P12N	No. 25	Valparaiso	W 73–67	4–0	Matthew Knight Arena (5,752); Eugene, OR
Nov. 25*; 4:00 pm, P12N	No. 21	Arkansas State; Global Sports Shootout	W 91–68	5–0	Matthew Knight Arena (5,465); Eugene, OR
Nov. 30*; 5:00 pm, P12N	No. 15	Fresno State	W 78–73	6–0	Matthew Knight Arena (5,205); Eugene, OR
Dec. 4*; 8:00 pm, ESPN2	No. 15	at UNLV; MGM Grand Showcase	L 69–80	6–1	MGM Grand Garden Arena (12,117); Paradise, NV
Dec. 7*; 6:30 pm, FS1	No. 24	vs. Navy; Pearl Harbor Classic	W 67–47	7–1	Bloch Arena (4,024); Honolulu, HI
Dec. 12*; 4:00 pm, CBSSN	No. 24	at Boise State	L 72–74	7–2	Taco Bell Arena (10,239); Boise, ID
Dec. 15*; 8:00 pm, P12N		UC Irvine	W 78–63	8–2	Matthew Knight Arena (5,863); Eugene, OR
Dec. 18*; 6:00 pm, P12N		Long Beach State	W 94–73	9–2	Matthew Knight Arena (6,112); Eugene, OR
Dec. 21*; 6:00 pm, ESPNU		at Alabama; Vulcan Classic	W 72–68	10–2	BJCC (14,508); Birmingham, AL
Dec. 29*; 6:00 pm, P12N		Western Oregon	W 88–60	11–2	Matthew Knight Arena (6,137); Eugene, OR
Pac-12 regular season
Jan. 3; 4:00 pm, FS1		at Oregon State; Civil War	L 57–70	11–3 (0–1)	Gill Coliseum (9,604); Corvallis, OR
Jan. 6; 6:00 pm, ESPN2		California	W 68–65	12–3 (1–1)	Matthew Knight Arena (6,948); Eugene, OR
Jan. 10; 7:00 pm, ESPNU		Stanford	W 71–58	13–3 (2–1)	Matthew Knight Arena (7,318); Eugene, OR
Jan. 14; 7:00 pm, P12N		at Utah	W 77–59	14–3 (3–1)	Jon M. Huntsman Center (12,733); Salt Lake City, UT
Jan. 17; 4:00 pm, P12N		at Colorado	L 87–91	14–4 (3–2)	Coors Events Center (8,459); Boulder, CO
Jan. 21; 6:00 pm, P12N		No. 21 USC	W 89–81	15–4 (4–2)	Matthew Knight Arena (8,471); Eugene, OR
Jan. 23; 1:00 pm, CBS		UCLA	W 86–72	16–4 (5–2)	Matthew Knight Arena (10,525); Eugene, OR
Jan. 28; 8:00 pm, ESPN2	No. 23	at No. 18 Arizona	W 83–75	17–4 (6–2)	McKale Center (14,644); Tucson, AZ
Jan. 31; 5:30 pm, ESPNU	No. 23	at Arizona State	W 91–74	18–4 (7–2)	Wells Fargo Arena (6,760); Tempe, AZ
Feb. 4; 6:00 pm, FS1	No. 16	Colorado	W 76–56	19–4 (8–2)	Matthew Knight Arena (7,226); Eugene, OR
Feb. 7; 1:00 pm, ESPN2	No. 16	Utah	W 76–66	20–4 (9–2)	Matthew Knight Arena (6,807); Eugene, OR
Feb. 11; 6:00 pm, ESPN2	No. 11	at California	L 63–83	20–5 (9–3)	Haas Pavilion (10,628); Berkeley, CA
Feb. 13; 1:00 pm, P12N	No. 11	at Stanford	L 72–76	20–6 (9–4)	Maples Pavilion (5,462); Stanford, CA
Feb. 20; 7:00 pm, P12N	No. 16	Oregon State; Civil War	W 91–81	21–6 (10–4)	Matthew Knight Arena (12,364); Eugene, OR
Feb. 24; 7:00 pm, P12N	No. 13	Washington State	W 76–62	22–6 (11–4)	Matthew Knight Arena (8,088); Eugene, OR
Feb. 28; 5:30 pm, ESPNU	No. 13	Washington	W 86–73	23–6 (12–4)	Matthew Knight Arena (12,364); Eugene, OR
Mar. 2; 6:00 pm, ESPN2	No. 9	at UCLA	W 76–68	24–6 (13–4)	Pauley Pavilion (6,578); Los Angeles, CA
Mar. 5; 1:00 pm, P12N	No. 9	at USC	W 76–66	25–6 (14–4)	Galen Center (6,834); Los Angeles, CA
Pac-12 tournament
Mar. 10; 12:00 pm, P12N	(1) No. 8	vs. (8) Washington; Quarterfinals	W 83–77	26–6	MGM Grand Garden Arena (12,916); Paradise, NV
Mar. 11; 6:00 pm, P12N	(1) No. 8	vs. (4) No. 15 Arizona; Semifinals	W 95–89 ^{OT}	27–6	MGM Grand Garden Arena (12,916); Paradise, NV
Mar. 12; 7:00 pm, FS1	(1) No. 8	vs. (2) No. 12 Utah; Championship	W 88–57	28–6	MGM Grand Garden Arena (12,916); Paradise, NV
NCAA tournament
Mar. 18*; 4:27 pm, truTV	(1 W) No. 5	vs. (16 W) Holy Cross; First Round	W 91–52	29–6	Spokane Arena (11,274); Spokane, WA
Mar. 20*; 6:40 pm, TBS	(1 W) No. 5	vs. (8 W) Saint Joseph's; Second Round	W 69–64	30–6	Spokane Arena (11,296); Spokane, WA
Mar. 24*; 6:55 pm, TBS	(1 W) No. 5	vs. (4 W) No. 19 Duke; Sweet Sixteen	W 82–68	31–6	Honda Center (17,601); Anaheim, CA
Mar. 26*; 3:09 pm, CBS	(1 W) No. 5	vs. (2 W) No. 7 Oklahoma; Elite Eight	L 68–80	31–7	Honda Center (16,232); Anaheim, CA
*Non-conference game. ^{#}Rankings from AP Poll. (#) Tournament seedings in parentheses. W=West Region. All times are in Pacific Time.

== Ranking movement ==
Ranking movement Legend: ██ Increase in ranking. ██ Decrease in ranking. ██ Not ranked the previous week. RV=Others receiving votes.
Poll	Pre	Wk 2	Wk 3	Wk 4	Wk 5	Wk 6	Wk 7	Wk 8	Wk 9	Wk 10	Wk 11	Wk 12	Wk 13	Wk 14	Wk 15	Wk 16	Wk 17	Wk 18	Post	Final
AP	RV	25	21	15	24	RV	RV	RV	RV	RV	RV	23	16	11	16	13	9	8	5	N/A
Coaches	RV	RV	23	16	23	RV	RV	RV	RV	RV	RV	24	17	12	17	13	10	9	4	6
