= 2015–16 California Golden Bears men's basketball team =

American college basketball season

2015–16 California Golden Bears men's basketball

NCAA tournament, First Round
- Conference: Pac-12 Conference

Ranking
- AP: No. 23
- Record: 23–11 (12–6 Pac–12)
- Head coach: Cuonzo Martin (2nd season)
- Assistant coaches: Tracy Webster; Yanni Hufnagel; Wyking Jones
- Home arena: Haas Pavilion

2015–16 Pac-12 Conference men's basketball standings
	Conf.				Overall
Team	W		L	PCT	W		L	PCT
No. 5 Oregon †	14	–	4	.778	31	–	7	.816
No. 13 Utah	13	–	5	.722	27	–	9	.750
No. 17 Arizona	12	–	6	.667	25	–	9	.735
No. 23 California	12	–	6	.667	23	–	11	.676
Colorado	10	–	8	.556	22	–	12	.647
USC	9	–	9	.500	21	–	13	.618
Oregon State	9	–	9	.500	19	–	13	.594
Washington	9	–	9	.500	19	–	15	.559
Stanford	8	–	10	.444	15	–	15	.500
UCLA	6	–	12	.333	15	–	17	.469
Arizona State	5	–	13	.278	15	–	17	.469
Washington State	1	–	17	.056	9	–	22	.290
† Pac-12 Tournament winner Rankings from AP poll

The 2015–16 California Golden Bears men's basketball team represented the University of California, Berkeley in the 2015–16 NCAA Division I men's basketball season. This was Cuonzo Martin's second year as head coach at California. The Golden Bears played their home games at Haas Pavilion as members of the Pac-12 Conference. They finished the season 23–11, 12–6 in Pac-12 play to finish in a tie for third place. They defeated Oregon State in the quarterfinals of the Pac-12 tournament to advance to the semifinals, where they lost to Utah. They received an at-large bid to the NCAA tournament, where they lost in the first round to Hawaii.

== Previous season ==
The 2014–15 Cal Golden Bears finished the season with an overall record of 18–15, and 7–11 in conference play. They finished in eighth place in the conference and entered the Pac-12 tournament winning their first-round game against Washington State before losing in the quarterfinals to Arizona.

== Off-season ==
=== Departures ===
Name	Number	Pos.	Height	Weight	Year	Hometown	Reason for departure
Dwight Tarwater	1	F	6'6"	230	RS senior	Knoxville, TN	Graduated
Christian Behrens	14	SF	6'8"	226	RS junior	Maple Valley, WA	Graduated
David Kravish	45	PF	6'10"	240	Senior	Lee's Summit, MO	Graduated

=== 2015 recruiting class ===
Golden Bears recruits at the 2015 McDonald's All-American Boys Game

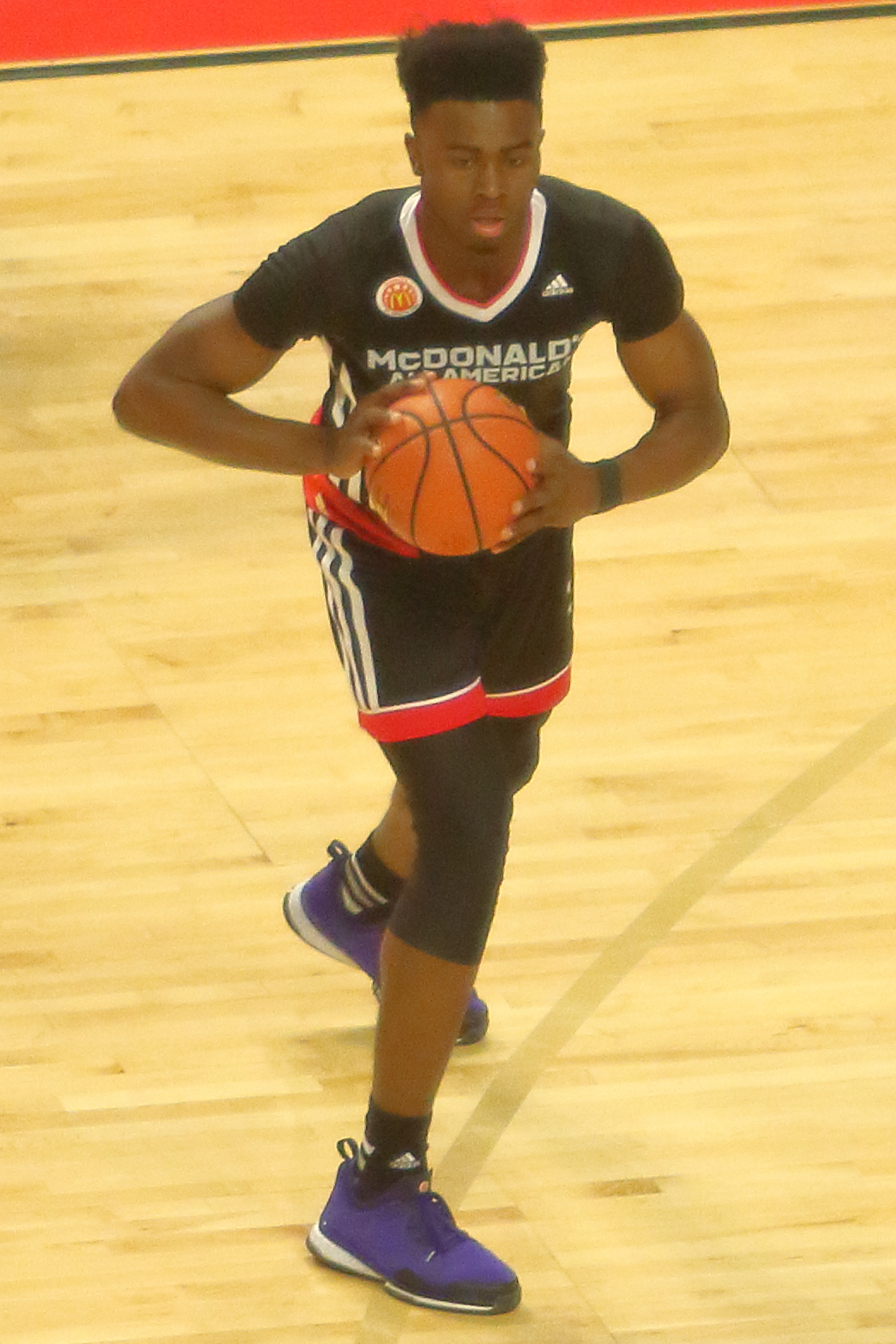
Jaylen Brown

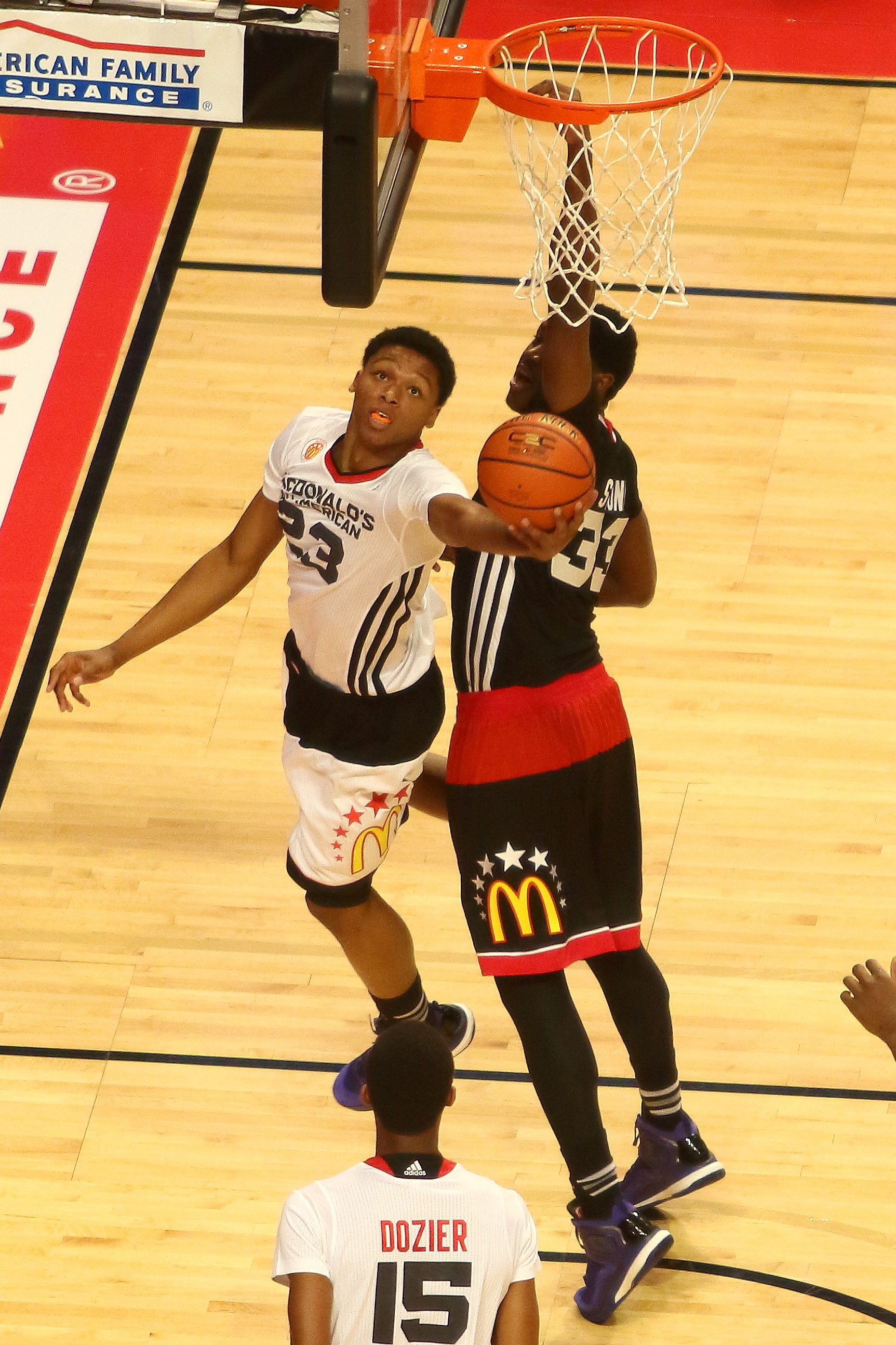
Ivan Rabb

College recruiting
Name	Hometown	School	Height	Weight	Commit date
Ivan Rabb; PF	Oakland, CA	Bishop O'Dowd High School	6 ft 10 in (2.08 m)	215 lb (98 kg)	Apr 13, 2015
Ivan Rabb; PF	Recruit ratings: Scout: Rivals: 247Sports: ESPN:				
Jaylen Brown; SF	Marietta, GA	Joseph Wheeler High School	6 ft 7 in (2.01 m)	220 lb (100 kg)	May 1, 2015
Jaylen Brown; SF	Recruit ratings: Scout: Rivals: 247Sports: ESPN:				
Roman Davis; SF	Los Angeles, CA	Windward School	6 ft 7 in (2.01 m)	195 lb (88 kg)	Jul 1, 2015
Roman Davis; SF	Recruit ratings: Scout: Rivals: 247Sports: ESPN:				
Overall recruit ranking: Scout: #3 Rivals: #7 247Sports: #7 ESPN: #5
Note: In many cases, Scout, Rivals, 247Sports, On3, and ESPN may conflict in their listings of height and weight.; In these cases, the average was taken. ESPN grades are on a 100-point scale.; Sources: "2015 California Basketball Commitment List". Rivals.; "California Golden Bears 2015 Player Commits". ESPN.; "2015 Team Ranking". Rivals.

== Roster ==
2015–16 California Golden Bears men's basketball team
Players
Coaches

Pos.	#	Name	Height	Weight	Year	Previous school	Hometown
F	0	Jaylen Brown	6 ft 7 in (2.01 m)	225 lb (102 kg)	Fr	Wheeler HS	Marietta, Georgia
F	1	Ivan Rabb	6 ft 11 in (2.11 m)	220 lb (100 kg)	Fr	Bishop O'Dowd HS	Oakland, California
G	2	Sam Singer	6 ft 4 in (1.93 m)	205 lb (93 kg)	Jr	Ransom Everglades HS	Miami, Florida
G	3	Tyrone Wallace	6 ft 5 in (1.96 m)	205 lb (93 kg)	Sr	Bakersfield HS	Bakersfield, California
G	10	Brandon Chauca	5 ft 9 in (1.75 m)	160 lb (73 kg)	So	22 Feet Academy	Alexandria, Virginia
F	12	Roger Moute a Bidias	6 ft 6 in (1.98 m)	206 lb (93 kg)	Jr	Notre Dame Prep	Yaoundé, Cameroon
G	20	Nick Kerr (W)	6 ft 3 in (1.91 m)	180 lb (82 kg)	RS Sr	Torrey Pines HS/San Diego	Rancho Santa Fe, California
G	21	Nick Hamilton (W)	6 ft 4 in (1.93 m)	192 lb (87 kg)	So	Westchester HS	Los Angeles, California
C	22	Kingsley Okoroh	7 ft 1 in (2.16 m)	252 lb (114 kg)	So	Westwind Prep	Derby, England
G	23	Jabari Bird	6 ft 6 in (1.98 m)	198 lb (90 kg)	Jr	Salesian HS	Vallejo, California
G	24	Jordan Mathews	6 ft 4 in (1.93 m)	203 lb (92 kg)	Jr	Santa Monica HS	San Francisco, California
F	25	Roman Davis (redshirt)	6 ft 7 in (2.01 m)	190 lb (86 kg)	Fr	Windward HS	Los Angeles, California
G	31	Stephen Domingo	6 ft 7 in (2.01 m)	217 lb (98 kg)	RS Jr	St. Ignatius/Georgetown	San Francisco, California
G	32	Brenden Glapion	6 ft 3 in (1.91 m)	195 lb (88 kg)	RS Sr	Washington HS/Seattle/Cosumnes River College	San Francisco, California
F	42	Cole Welle (W)	6 ft 7 in (2.01 m)	228 lb (103 kg)	So	Aptos HS	Aptos, California
C	44	Kameron Rooks	7 ft 0 in (2.13 m)	250 lb (113 kg)	RS So	Mission Hills HS	San Marcos, California

Head coach

- Cuonzo Martin

Assistant coach(es)

- Tracy Webster
- Yanni Hufnagel
- Wyking Jones

Legend

- (C) Team captain
- (S) Suspended
- (I) Ineligible
- (W) Walk-on
- Injured
- Current redshirt

Roster
Last update: February 9, 2016

== Schedule ==
Date time, TV	Rank^{#}	Opponent^{#}	Result	Record	High points	High rebounds	High assists	Site (attendance) city, state
Tour of Australia
Aug. 15*; 9:00 pm		at Victoria Select	W 100–63		17 – Brown	10 – Rabb	7 – Chauca	Frankston Basketball Stadium; Frankston, Victoria
Aug. 18*; 2:00 am		at Frankston Blues	W 84–76		19 – Brown	7 – Tied	4 – Wallace	Frankston Basketball Stadium; Frankston, Victoria
Aug. 20*; 12:00 am		at BA Centre of Excellence	W 94–86		19 – Bird	12 – Rabb	3 – Brown	AIS Arena; Canberra, ACT
Aug. 21*; 1:00 am		at Illawarra Hawks	L 99–110 ^{OT}		24 – Mathews	10 – Rabb	6 – Wallace	WIN Entertainment Centre; Wollongong, NSW
Exhibition
Nov. 9*; 7:00 pm, P12N	No. 14	Carroll (MT)	W 93–58		17 – Brown	11 – Rabb	9 – Singer	Haas Pavilion (8,613); Berkeley, CA
Non-conference regular season
Nov. 13*; 8:30 pm, P12N	No. 14	Rice	W 97–65	1–0	20 – Wallace	13 – Rabb	8 – Wallace	Haas Pavilion (10,530); Berkeley, CA
Nov. 16*; 7:00 pm, P12N	No. 15	UC Santa Barbara	W 85–67	2–0	24 – Wallace	7 – Tied	6 – Wallace	Haas Pavilion (8,847); Berkeley, CA
Nov. 20*; 8:00 pm, P12N	No. 15	East Carolina; Las Vegas Invitational	W 70–62	3–0	20 – Wallace	13 – Rabb	4 – Singer	Haas Pavilion (8,658); Berkeley, CA
Nov. 23*; 8:00 pm, P12N	No. 14	Sam Houston State; Las Vegas Invitational	W 89–63	4–0	18 – Tied	11 – Brown	6 – Wallace	Haas Pavilion (8,492); Berkeley, CA
Nov. 26*; 9:00 pm, FS1	No. 14	vs. San Diego State; Las Vegas Invitational Semifinals	L 58–72	4–1	18 – Rabb	9 – Rabb	3 – Wallace	Orleans Arena (N/A); Las Vegas, NV
Nov. 27*; 5:00 pm, FS1	No. 14	vs. Richmond; Las Vegas Invitational Consolation	L 90–94	4–2	27 – Brown	7 – Rabb	3 – Bird	Orleans Arena (N/A); Las Vegas, NV
Dec. 1*; 7:00 pm, P12N		Seattle	W 66–52	5–2	17 – Wallace	11 – Wallace	8 – Wallace	Haas Pavilion (9,423); Berkeley, CA
Dec. 5*; 12:00 pm, CBSSN		at Wyoming	W 78–72 ^{OT}	6–2	23 – Wallace	6 – Tied	6 – Wallace	Arena-Auditorium (6,568); Laramie, WY
Dec. 9*; 8:00 pm, P12N		Incarnate Word	W 74–62	7–2	15 – Bird	11 – Rabb	8 – Wallace	Haas Pavilion (9,324); Berkeley, CA
Dec. 12*; 12:30 pm, P12N		Saint Mary's	W 63–59	8–2	15 – Rabb	11 – Rabb	3 – Wallace	Haas Pavilion (10,074); Berkeley, CA
Dec. 19*; 4:00 pm, P12N		Coppin State	W 84–51	9–2	13 – Tied	9 – Tied	5 – Brown	Haas Pavilion (9,347); Berkeley, CA
Dec. 22*; 6:00 p.m., ESPN2		at No. 5 Virginia	L 62–63 ^{OT}	9–3	18 – Brown	12 – Rabb	2 – Tied	John Paul Jones Arena (13,265); Charlottesville, VA
Dec. 28*; 6:00 pm, P12N		Davidson	W 86–60	10–3	22 – Mathews	11 – Rabb	4 – Tied	Haas Pavilion (10,384); Berkeley, CA
Pac-12 regular season
Jan. 1; 8:00 pm, P12N		Colorado	W 79–65	11–3 (1–0)	22 – Mathews	11 – Brown	8 – Wallace	Haas Pavilion (9,964); Berkeley, CA
Jan. 3; 4:30 pm, P12N		No. 21 Utah	W 71–58	12–3 (2–0)	19 – Rabb	10 – Rabb	6 – Wallace	Haas Pavilion (10,188); Berkeley, CA
Jan. 6; 6:00 pm, ESPN2		at Oregon	L 65–68	12–4 (2–1)	20 – Brown	9 – Brown	3 – Mathews	Matthew Knight Arena (6,948); Eugene, OR
Jan. 9; 6:30 pm, P12N		at Oregon State	L 71–77	12–5 (2–2)	20 – Brown	10 – Rabb	6 – Wallace	Gill Coliseum (7,208); Corvallis, OR
Jan. 14; 8:00 pm, FS1		at Stanford	L 71–77	12–6 (2–3)	17 – Tied	7 – Tied	4 – Wallace	Maples Pavilion (5,023); Stanford, CA
Jan. 21; 6:00 pm, FS1		Arizona State	W 75–70	13–6 (3–3)	20 – Rabb	8 – Tied	8 – Singer	Haas Pavilion (9,096); Berkeley, CA
Jan. 23; 5:30 pm, ESPN		No. 12 Arizona	W 74–73	14–6 (4–3)	28 – Mathews	7 – Rooks	7 – Brown	Haas Pavilion (11,858); Berkeley, CA
Jan. 27; 8:00 pm, ESPNU		at Utah	L 64–73	14–7 (4–4)	27 – Brown	12 – Rabb	3 – Singer	Jon M. Huntsman Center (13,055); Salt Lake City, UT
Jan. 31; 2:00 pm, FS1		at Colorado	L 62–70	14–8 (4–5)	21 – Brown	12 – Rooks	2 – Tied	Coors Events Center (9,423); Boulder, CO
Feb. 6; 1:00 pm, ESPN2		Stanford	W 76–61	15–8 (5–5)	18 – Mathews	12 – Rooks	9 – Singer	Haas Pavilion (11,858); Berkeley, CA
Feb. 11; 6:00 pm, ESPN2		No. 11 Oregon	W 83–63	16–8 (6–5)	24 – Bird	8 – Wallace	11 – Singer	Haas Pavilion (10,628); Berkeley, CA
Feb. 13; 3:30 pm, P12N		Oregon State	W 83–71	17–8 (7–5)	23 – Bird	8 – Tied	4 – Tied	Haas Pavilion (10,906); Berkeley, CA
Feb. 18; 8:00 pm, FS1		at Washington	W 78–75	18–8 (8–5)	23 – Brown	14 – Tied	3 – Wallace	Alaska Airlines Arena (7,530); Seattle, WA
Feb. 21; 5:30 pm, ESPNU		at Washington State	W 80–62	19–8 (9–5)	17 – Wallace	7 – Rooks	3 – Tied	Beasley Coliseum (3,203); Pullman, WA
Feb. 25; 6:00 pm, ESPN2		UCLA	W 75–63	20–8 (10–5)	20 – Bird	10 – Tied	6 – Wallace	Haas Pavilion (11,858); Berkeley, CA
Feb. 28; 5:00 pm, FS1		USC	W 87–65	21–8 (11–5)	18 – Tied	10 – Rabb	6 – Wallace	Haas Pavilion (11,858); Berkeley, CA
Mar. 3; 6:00 pm, ESPN	No. 25	at No. 18 Arizona	L 61–64	21–9 (11–6)	15 – Rabb	13 – Rabb	3 – Singer	McKale Center (14,644); Tucson, AZ
Mar. 5; 5:00 pm, ESPN2	No. 25	at Arizona State	W 68–65	22–9 (12–6)	24 – Wallace	6 – Brown	5 – Wallace	Wells Fargo Arena (6,276); Tempe, AZ
Pac-12 tournament
Mar. 10; 8:30 pm, FS1	(3) No. 24	vs. (6) Oregon State; Quarterfinals	W 76–68	23–9	21 – Rabb	15 – Rabb	10 – Wallace	MGM Grand Garden Arena (12,916); Paradise, NV
Mar. 11; 8:30 pm, FS1	(3) No. 24	vs. (2) No. 12 Utah; Semifinals	L 78–82 ^{OT}	23–10	26 – Wallace	6 – Wallace	5 – Brown	MGM Grand Garden Arena (12,916); Paradise, NV
NCAA tournament
Mar. 18*; 11:00 am, TBS	(4 S) No. 23	vs. (13 S) Hawaii; First Round	L 66–77	23–11	23 – Mathews	12 – Rabb	2 – Tied	Spokane Veterans Memorial Arena (11,736); Spokane, WA
*Non-conference game. ^{#}Rankings from AP Poll. (#) Tournament seedings in parentheses. S=South Region. All times are in Pacific Time.

== Ranking movement ==
Ranking movement Legend: ██ Increase in ranking. ██ Decrease in ranking. RV=Received votes. NV = No votes received.
Poll	Pre	Wk 2	Wk 3	Wk 4	Wk 5	Wk 6	Wk 7	Wk 8	Wk 9	Wk 10	Wk 11	Wk 12	Wk 13	Wk 14	Wk 15	Wk 16	Wk 17	Wk 18	Post	Final
AP	14	15	14	RV	NV	NV	NV	NV	RV	NV	NV	NV	NV	NV	RV	RV	25	24	23	N/A
Coaches	14	14	13	RV	RV	RV	RV	RV	RV	RV	RV	RV	RV	RV	RV	RV	25	24	23	RV

== See also ==
- 2015–16 California Golden Bears women's basketball team
