= 2015–16 USC Trojans men's basketball team =

American college basketball season

2015–16 USC Trojans men's basketball

NCAA tournament, First Round
- Conference: Pac-12 Conference
- Record: 21–13 (9–9 Pac-12)
- Head coach: Andy Enfield (3rd season)
- Assistant coaches: Tony Bland; Jason Hart; Kevin Norris
- Home arena: Galen Center

2015–16 Pac-12 Conference men's basketball standings
	Conf.				Overall
Team	W		L	PCT	W		L	PCT
No. 5 Oregon †	14	–	4	.778	31	–	7	.816
No. 13 Utah	13	–	5	.722	27	–	9	.750
No. 17 Arizona	12	–	6	.667	25	–	9	.735
No. 23 California	12	–	6	.667	23	–	11	.676
Colorado	10	–	8	.556	22	–	12	.647
USC	9	–	9	.500	21	–	13	.618
Oregon State	9	–	9	.500	19	–	13	.594
Washington	9	–	9	.500	19	–	15	.559
Stanford	8	–	10	.444	15	–	15	.500
UCLA	6	–	12	.333	15	–	17	.469
Arizona State	5	–	13	.278	15	–	17	.469
Washington State	1	–	17	.056	9	–	22	.290
† Pac-12 Tournament winner Rankings from AP poll

The 2015–16 USC Trojans men's basketball team represented the University of Southern California during the 2015–16 NCAA Division I men's basketball season. They were led by third-year head coach Andy Enfield. They played their home games at the Galen Center and were members of the Pac-12 Conference. They finished the season 21–13, 9–9 in Pac-12 play to finish in a three-way tie for sixth place. They defeated UCLA in the first round of the Pac-12 tournament to advance to the quarterfinals where they lost to Utah. They received an at-large bid to the NCAA tournament where they lost in the first round to Providence.

== Previous season ==
The 2014–15 USC Trojans finished the season with an overall record of 12–20, and 3–15 in the Pac-12 regular season. In the 2015 Pac-12 tournament, the Trojans defeated Arizona State, 67–64 in the first round, before losing to UCLA, 96–70 in the quarterfinal. USC became the first 12-seed to win a game in the Pac-12 Tournament.

== Off-season ==
=== Departures ===
Name	Number	Pos.	Height	Weight	Year	Hometown	Notes
Kahlil Dukes	5	G	6'0"	170	Junior	Hartford, CT	Transferred to Niagara
Brendyn Taylor	15	G	6'3"	185	RS Junior	Los Angeles, CA	Transferred to Santa Clara

=== Incoming transfers ===
Name	Number	Pos.	Height	Weight	Year	Hometown	Notes
Shaqquan Aaron	3	SF	6'7"	170	Freshman	Seattle, WA	Transfer from Louisville. Aaron will have to sit out the 2015–16 season under NCAA transfer rules. He will have three seasons of eligibility remaining.

=== 2015 recruiting class ===
College recruiting
Name	Hometown	School	Height	Weight	Commit date
Chimezie Metu #9 PF	Lawndale, CA	Lawndale High School	6 ft 9 in (2.06 m)	215 lb (98 kg)	May 12, 2014
Chimezie Metu #9 PF	Recruit ratings: Scout: Rivals: 247Sports: ESPN:				
Bennie Boatwright #20 PF	Sun Valley, CA	Village Christian Schools	6 ft 9 in (2.06 m)	220 lb (100 kg)	
Bennie Boatwright #20 PF	Recruit ratings: Scout: Rivals: 247Sports: ESPN:				
Overall recruit ranking:
Note: In many cases, Scout, Rivals, 247Sports, On3, and ESPN may conflict in their listings of height and weight.; In these cases, the average was taken. ESPN grades are on a 100-point scale.; Sources: "2015 USC Basketball Commits". ESPN.; "2015 Team Ranking". Rivals.

== Roster ==
2015–16 USC Trojans men's basketball team
Players
Coaches
}

Pos.	#	Name	Height	Weight	Year	Hometown
F	0	Darion Clark	6 ft 7 in (2.01 m)	220 lb (100 kg)	RS Jr	Conyers, GA
F	2	Malik Martin	6 ft 11 in (2.11 m)	220 lb (100 kg)	So	Miami, FL
F	3	Shaqquan Aaron (redshirt)	6 ft 7 in (2.01 m)	175 lb (79 kg)	So	Seattle, WA
F	4	Chimezie Metu	6 ft 11 in (2.11 m)	215 lb (98 kg)	Fr	Lawndale, CA
G	5	Katin Reinhardt	6 ft 6 in (1.98 m)	215 lb (98 kg)	RS Jr	Dana Point, CA
G	11	Jordan McLaughlin	6 ft 1 in (1.85 m)	170 lb (77 kg)	So	Rancho Cucamonga, CA
G	12	Julian Jacobs	6 ft 4 in (1.93 m)	180 lb (82 kg)	Jr	Las Vegas, NV
F	13	Samer Dhillon (W)	6 ft 7 in (2.01 m)	220 lb (100 kg)	Jr	Sacramento, CA
F	14	Strahinja Gavrilović	6 ft 9 in (2.06 m)	230 lb (104 kg)	Sr	Kragujevac, RS
G	21	Kurt Karis (W) (redshirt)	6 ft 1 in (1.85 m)	190 lb (86 kg)	Jr	Northbrook, IL
F	24	Malik Marquetti	6 ft 6 in (1.98 m)	195 lb (88 kg)	So	Compton, CA
F	25	Bennie Boatwright	6 ft 10 in (2.08 m)	220 lb (100 kg)	Fr	Sun Valley, CA
G	30	Elijah Stewart	6 ft 5 in (1.96 m)	180 lb (82 kg)	So	Los Angeles, CA
F	32	Nikola Jovanović	6 ft 11 in (2.11 m)	230 lb (104 kg)	Jr	Belgrade, RS

Head coach

- Andy Enfield (Johns Hopkins)

Assistant coach(es)

- Tony Bland (San Diego State)
- Jason Hart (Syracuse)
- Kevin Norris (Miami (FL))

Legend

- (C) Team captain
- (S) Suspended
- (I) Ineligible
- (W) Walk-on
- Injured
- Current redshirt

Roster
Last update: May 3, 2016

== Schedule ==
Date time, TV	Rank^{#}	Opponent^{#}	Result	Record	High points	High rebounds	High assists	Site (attendance) city, state
Non-conference regular season
Nov. 13*; 5:00 pm, P12N		San Diego	W 84–63	1–0	20 – McLaughlin	11 – Stewart	4 – Reinhardt	Galen Center (3,434); Los Angeles, CA
Nov. 16*; 7:00 pm, P12N		Monmouth; AdvoCare Invitational Opening Round	W 101–90	2–0	22 – McLaughlin	12 – Jovanovic	8 – Jacobs	Galen Center (2,230); Los Angeles, CA
Nov. 21*; 7:30 pm, P12N		New Mexico	W 90–82	3–0	19 – McLaughlin	9 – Boatwright	6 – McLaughlin	Galen Center (2,943); Los Angeles, CA
Nov. 23*; 6:00 pm, P12N		Cal State Northridge	W 96–61	4–0	20 – McLaughlin	12 – Jacobs	8 – Jacobs	Galen Center (2,764); Los Angeles, CA
Nov. 26*; 11:30 am, ESPN2		vs. No. 20 Wichita State; AdvoCare Invitational Quarterfinals	W 72–69	5–0	22 – Boatwright	11 – Jovanovic	9 – Jacobs	HP Field House (4,629); Lake Buena Vista, FL
Nov. 27*; 11:30 am, ESPNU		vs. No. 23 Xavier; AdvoCare Invitational Semifinals	L 77–87	5–1	15 – Tied	5 – Tied	6 – Jacobs	HP Field House (4,170); Lake Buena Vista, FL
Nov. 29*; 9:30 am, ESPN2		vs. Monmouth; AdvoCare Invitational 3rd place game	L 73–83	5–2	19 – Jacobs	10 – Clark	5 – Jacobs	HP Field House (1,631); Lake Buena Vista, FL
Dec. 3*; 7:00 pm		at UC Santa Barbara	W 75–63	6–2	15 – Stewart	10 – Jacobs	7 – Reinhardt	The Thunderdome (3,585); Santa Barbara, CA
Dec. 7*; 7:00 pm, P12N		Idaho	W 74–55	7–2	17 – Tied	8 – Jovanovic	7 – McLaughlin	Galen Center (2,865); Los Angeles, CA
Dec. 13*; 1:00 pm, P12N		Yale	W 68–56	8–2	17 – Boatwright	9 – Clark	4 – McLaughlin	Galen Center (4,117); Los Angeles, CA
Dec. 17*; 7:00 pm, P12N		Cal Poly	W 101–82	9–2	29 – Reinhardt	7 – Jovanovic	13 – Jacobs	Galen Center (2,811); Los Angeles, CA
Dec. 21*; 8:00 pm, P12N		SIU Edwardsville	W 70–51	10–2	21 – Jovanovic	16 – Jovanovic	6 – McLaughlin	Galen Center (3,409); Los Angeles, CA
Dec. 23*; 7:00 pm, P12N		Lafayette	W 100–64	11–2	27 – Stewart	8 – 3 Tied	16 – McLaughlin	Galen Center (3,215); Los Angeles, CA
Pac-12 regular season
Jan. 1; 6:00 pm, P12N		at Washington State	W 90–77	12–2 (1–0)	20 – Jovanovic	12 – Jovanovic	4 – Jacobs	Beasley Coliseum (2,314); Pullman, WA
Jan. 3; 12:00 pm, P12N		at Washington	L 85–87	12–3 (1–1)	15 – 3 Tied	10 – Jovanovic	6 – McLaughlin	Alaska Airlines Arena (7,031); Seattle, WA
Jan. 7; 7:30 pm, P12N		Arizona State	W 85–75	13–3 (2–1)	15 – Jacobs	10 – Clark	8 – McLaughlin	Galen Center (2,754); Los Angeles, CA
Jan. 9; 4:00 pm, P12N		No. 7 Arizona	W 103–101 ^{4OT}	14–3 (3–1)	27 – Stewart	7 – Clark	9 – Jacobs	Galen Center (6,854); Los Angeles, CA
Jan. 13; 8:00 pm, ESPN2		at UCLA; Rivalry	W 89–75	15–3 (4–1)	23 – McLaughlin	8 – Tied	5 – Jacobs	Pauley Pavilion (12,993); Los Angeles, CA
Jan. 21; 6:00 pm, P12N	No. 21	at Oregon	L 81–89	15–4 (4–2)	23 – Boatwright	12 – Boatwright	5 – Jacobs	Matthew Knight Arena (8,471); Eugene, OR
Jan. 24; 12:00 pm, P12N	No. 21	at Oregon State	L 70–85	15–5 (4–3)	16 – Stewart	9 – Stewart	6 – Jacobs	Gill Coliseum (7,020); Corvallis, OR
Jan. 28; 7:30 pm, P12N		Washington State	W 81–71	16–5 (5–3)	18 – Reinhardt	7 – Jovanovic	9 – Jacobs	Galen Center (4,392); Los Angeles, CA
Jan. 30; 12:00 pm, P12N		Washington	W 98–88	17–5 (6–3)	28 – Jovanovic	8 – Boatwright	6 – Jacobs	Galen Center (6,387); Los Angeles, CA
Feb. 4; 7:30 pm, P12N		UCLA; Rivalry	W 80–61	18–5 (7–3)	17 – Jacobs	6 – Tied	10 – McLaughlin	Galen Center (10,258); Los Angeles, CA
Feb. 12; 5:00 pm, P12N	No. 23	at Arizona State	L 67–74	18–6 (7–4)	25 – Jovanovic	15 – Jovanovic	6 – McLaughlin	Wells Fargo Arena (7,772); Tempe, AZ
Feb. 14; 5:00 pm, FS1	No. 23	at No. 17 Arizona	L 78–86	18–7 (7–5)	18 – Boatwright	7 – Boatwright	7 – Jacobs	McKale Center (14,644); Tucson, AZ
Feb. 17; 8:00 pm, ESPNU		Colorado	W 79–72	19–7 (8–5)	25 – McLaughlin	6 – Jovanovic	5 – McLaughlin	Galen Center (5,132); Los Angeles, CA
Feb. 21; 3:00 pm, P12N		Utah	L 69–80	19–8 (8–6)	20 – McLaughlin	6 – Boatwright	4 – Boatwright	Galen Center (7,931); Los Angeles, CA
Feb. 25; 8:00 pm, P12N		at Stanford	L 64–84	19–9 (8–7)	14 – Reinhardt	5 – Tied	4 – McLaughlin	Maples Pavilion (4,080); Stanford, CA
Feb. 28; 5:00 pm, FS1		at California	L 65–87	19–10 (8–8)	21 – Jovanovic	9 – Jovanovic	6 – Jacobs	Haas Pavilion (11,858); Berkeley, CA
Mar. 2; 8:00 pm, FS1		Oregon State	W 81–70	20–10 (9–8)	17 – McLaughlin	8 – Jovanovic	9 – McLaughlin	Galen Center (4,588); Los Angeles, CA
Mar. 4; 1:00 pm, P12N		No. 9 Oregon	L 66–76	20–11 (9–9)	12 – Tied	6 – Metu	4 – Jacobs	Galen Center (6,834); Los Angeles, CA
Pac-12 tournament
Mar. 9; 6:00 pm, P12N	(7)	vs. (10) UCLA; First Round	W 95–71	21–11	19 – Boatwright	11 – Metu	9 – Jacobs	MGM Grand Garden Arena (12,916); Paradise, NV
Mar. 10; 6:00 pm, P12N	(7)	vs. (2) No. 12 Utah; Quarterfinals	L 72–80	21–12	24 – McLaughlin	8 – Jacobs	6 – Jacobs	MGM Grand Garden Arena (12,916); Paradise, NV
NCAA tournament
Mar. 17*; 6:50 PM, TBS	(8 E)	vs. (9 E) Providence; First Round	L 69–70	21–13	15 – McLaughlin	7 – Jovanovic	5 – McLaughlin	PNC Arena (17,387); Raleigh, NC
*Non-conference game. ^{#}Rankings from AP Poll. (#) Tournament seedings in parentheses. E=East Region. All times are in Pacific Time.

== Ranking movement ==
Ranking movement Legend: ██ Increase in ranking. ██ Decrease in ranking. RV = Received votes. NV = Received no votes.
Poll	Pre	Wk 2	Wk 3	Wk 4	Wk 5	Wk 6	Wk 7	Wk 8	Wk 9	Wk 10	Wk 11	Wk 12	Wk 13	Wk 14	Wk 15	Wk 16	Wk 17	Wk 18	Wk 19	Final
AP	NV	NV	NV	NV	NV	NV	NV	NV	NV	RV	21	RV	RV	23	RV	RV	NV	NV	NV	N/A
Coaches	NV	NV	NV	NV	NV	NV	NV	RV	RV	RV	25	RV	RV	23	RV	RV	NV	NV	NV	NV
