= 2016 Pac-12 Conference men's basketball tournament =

- Classification: Division I
- Season: 2015–16
- Teams: 12
- Site: MGM Grand Garden Arena; Paradise, Nevada
- Champions: Oregon (4th title)
- Winning coach: Dana Altman (2nd title)
- MVP: Elgin Cook (Oregon)
- Attendance: 77,496 (total); 12,916 (championship game)
- Television: Pac-12 Network, FS1

2015–16 Pac-12 Conference men's basketball standings
	Conf.				Overall
Team	W		L	PCT	W		L	PCT
No. 5 Oregon †	14	–	4	.778	31	–	7	.816
No. 13 Utah	13	–	5	.722	27	–	9	.750
No. 17 Arizona	12	–	6	.667	25	–	9	.735
No. 23 California	12	–	6	.667	23	–	11	.676
Colorado	10	–	8	.556	22	–	12	.647
USC	9	–	9	.500	21	–	13	.618
Oregon State	9	–	9	.500	19	–	13	.594
Washington	9	–	9	.500	19	–	15	.559
Stanford	8	–	10	.444	15	–	15	.500
UCLA	6	–	12	.333	15	–	17	.469
Arizona State	5	–	13	.278	15	–	17	.469
Washington State	1	–	17	.056	9	–	22	.290
† Pac-12 Tournament winner Rankings from AP poll

The 2016 Pac-12 Conference men's basketball tournament was the postseason men's basketball tournament for the Pac-12. It was played between March 9 through March 12 at the MGM Grand Garden Arena in Paradise, Nevada. The champion, the Oregon Ducks, received an automatic bid to the 2016 NCAA tournament.

== Seeds ==
Teams seeded by conference record, with ties broken by record between the tied teams followed by record against the regular-season champion, if necessary.

Seed	School	Conference	Overall	Tiebreaker 1	Tiebreaker 2	Tiebreaker 3	Tiebreaker 4	Tiebreaker 5
1	Oregon^{†#}	14–4	25–6					
2	Utah^{#}	13–5	24–7					
3	California^{#}	12–6	22–9	1–1 vs. Ariz.	1–1 vs. Ore.			
4	Arizona^{#}	12–6	24–7	1–1 vs. Cal	0–1 vs. Ore.			
5	Colorado	10–8	21–10					
6	Oregon State	9–9	18–11	2–1 vs. Wash. & USC				
7	USC	9–9	20–11	2–2 vs. Wash. & OSU	1–1 vs. Wash.	0–2 vs. Ore.	0–1 vs. Utah	1–2 vs. Cal & Ariz.
8	Washington	9–9	17–13	1–2 vs. OSU & USC	1–1 vs. USC	0–1 vs. Ore.	0–2 vs. Utah	0–3 vs. Cal & Ariz.
9	Stanford	8–10	15–14					
10	UCLA	6–12	15–16					
11	Arizona State	5–13	15–16					
12	Washington State	1–17	9–21					
† – Pac-12 regular season champions, and tournament No. 1 seed. # – Received a first round bye in the conference tournament. Overall records include all games played in the Pac-12 Tournament.

== Schedule ==
Session	Game	Time*	Matchup^{#}	Final score	Television	Attendance
First round – Wednesday, March 9
1	1	12:00 pm	#8 Washington vs. #9 Stanford	91–68	Pac-12 Network	12,916
1	2	2:30 pm	#5 Colorado vs. #12 Washington State	80–56	Pac-12 Network	12,916
2	3	6:00 pm	#7 USC vs. #10 UCLA	95–71	Pac-12 Network	12,916
2	4	8:30 pm	#6 Oregon State vs. #11 Arizona State	75–66	Pac-12 Network	12,916
Quarterfinals – Thursday, March 10
3	5	12:00 pm	#1 Oregon vs. #8 Washington	83–77	Pac-12 Network	12,916
3	6	2:30 pm	#4 Arizona vs. #5 Colorado	82–78	Pac-12 Network	12,916
4	7	6:00 pm	#2 Utah vs. #7 USC	80–72	Pac-12 Network	12,916
4	8	8:30 pm	#3 California vs. #6 Oregon State	76–68	FS1	12,916
Semifinals – Friday, March 11
5	9	6:00 pm	#1 Oregon vs. #4 Arizona	95–89^{OT}	Pac-12 Network	12,916
5	10	8:30 pm	#2 Utah vs. #3 California	82–78^{OT}	FS1	12,916
Championship – Saturday, March 12
6	11	7:00 pm	#1 Oregon vs. #2 Utah	88–57	FS1	12,916
*Game times in PT. #-Rankings denote tournament seed

== Bracket ==
First round Wednesday March 9
8	Washington	91
9	Stanford	68
5	Colorado	80
12	Washington State	56
7	USC	95
10	UCLA	71
6	Oregon State	75
11	Arizona State	66

Quarterfinals; Thursday March 10
1	#5 Oregon	83
8	Washington	77
4	#15 Arizona	82
5	Colorado	78
2	#12 Utah	80
7	USC	72
3	#24 California	76
6	Oregon State	68

Semifinals; Friday March 11
1	#5 Oregon	95*
4	#15 Arizona	89
2	#12 Utah	82*
3	#24 California	78

Championship; Saturday March 12
1	#5 Oregon	88
2	#12 Utah	57

* denotes each overtime period played

== All-tournament team ==
- Dillon Brooks, Oregon
- Chris Boucher, Oregon
- Elgin Cook, Oregon
- Tyler Dorsey, Oregon
- Ivan Rabb, California
- Jakob Poeltl, Utah

== Most outstanding player ==
- Elgin Cook, Oregon

== Hall of Honor inductees ==
- Salim Stoudamire (Arizona)
- Art Becker (Arizona State)
- Brian Hendrick (California)
- Scott Wedman (Colorado)
- Luke Ridnour (Oregon)
- Jim Anderson (Oregon State)
- Kim Belton (Stanford)
- Keith Erickson (UCLA)
- Sam Clancy (USC)
- Vern Gardner (Utah)
- Isaiah Thomas (Washington)
- Keith Morrison (Washington State)
