= 2015–16 UCLA Bruins men's basketball team =

American college basketball season

2015–16 UCLA Bruins men's basketball
- Conference: Pac-12 Conference
- Record: 15–17 (6–12 Pac-12)
- Head coach: Steve Alford (3rd season)
- Assistant coaches: Ed Schilling; Duane Broussard; David Grace
- Home arena: Pauley Pavilion

2015–16 Pac-12 Conference men's basketball standings
	Conf.				Overall
Team	W		L	PCT	W		L	PCT
No. 5 Oregon †	14	–	4	.778	31	–	7	.816
No. 13 Utah	13	–	5	.722	27	–	9	.750
No. 17 Arizona	12	–	6	.667	25	–	9	.735
No. 23 California	12	–	6	.667	23	–	11	.676
Colorado	10	–	8	.556	22	–	12	.647
USC	9	–	9	.500	21	–	13	.618
Oregon State	9	–	9	.500	19	–	13	.594
Washington	9	–	9	.500	19	–	15	.559
Stanford	8	–	10	.444	15	–	15	.500
UCLA	6	–	12	.333	15	–	17	.469
Arizona State	5	–	13	.278	15	–	17	.469
Washington State	1	–	17	.056	9	–	22	.290
† Pac-12 Tournament winner Rankings from AP poll

The 2015–16 UCLA Bruins men's basketball team represented the University of California, Los Angeles, during the 2015–16 NCAA Division I men's basketball season. They finished the season with a 15–17 record, the fourth time the program finished with a losing record since 1948, when John Wooden became their coach. The Bruins were led by third-year head coach Steve Alford and played their home games at Pauley Pavilion as members in the Pac-12 Conference. Isaac Hamilton earned second-team All-Pac-12 honors, the only Bruin named to the all-conference team.

With Kevon Looney having moved on to the National Basketball Association (NBA), sophomore Thomas Welsh was promoted to UCLA's starting lineup at center, while center Tony Parker moved to forward. Freshman guard Aaron Holiday also opened the season as a starter, teaming with Hamilton and Bryce Alford to form a three-guard lineup. The Bruins lost their season opener to Monmouth and lost consecutive games in the Maui Invitational to Kansas and Wake Forest. However, they recovered to upset then-No. 1 Kentucky 87–77 at home and defeated then-No. 20 Gonzaga 71–66 on the road. UCLA finished their non-conference schedule winning six of their last seven games, and entered Pac-12 play at 9–4 and ranked No. 25 in the nation. They were comparatively better than a year earlier, when they entered conference play with five losses and a three-game losing streak.

The Bruins had an early conference win against then-No. 7 Arizona, but they were 4–5 halfway through the Pac-12 schedule, including 0–4 against the three teams with the quickest pace in the conference, Washington, USC, and Oregon. Their defense was weakened without comparable replacements for Looney and Norman Powell, a senior from the prior season, and sophomore György Golomán had been out for much of the season with a stress fracture in his leg. UCLA coach Steve Alford believed his big front court was "slow" and had sophomore Jonah Bolden start in place of the senior Parker. While Bolden was 1 inch (25 mm) taller than Parker, he was also 40 pounds (18 kg) lighter. UCLA began their second half with a loss to USC, who swept the Bruins for the first time since 2010. The Bruins lost both games in their crosstown rivalry by double digits for the first time since 1938. In their next game, UCLA blew a 10-point halftime lead to Arizona en route to their fifth loss in seven games. The loss dropped them out of all major NCAA tournament projections and mired in 10th place in the Pac-12. The Bruins were eliminated from the Pac-12 tournament after a 95–71 loss to USC, losing three consecutive times in the same season to the Trojans for the first time in 74 years. UCLA missed the NCAA Tournament for just the third time in 10 years.

== Previous season ==
The Bruins finished in fourth place (11–7) in the Pac-12 conference. They earned a No. 11 seed in the NCAA Championship tournament, and advanced to the Sweet 16, becoming the lowest-seed UCLA team to ever reach the regional semifinals. They defeated SMU 60–59 in the second round and UAB 92–75 in the third round. Then the Bruins lost to Gonzaga for the second time of the season, 74–62 in the Sweet Sixteen. The program produced its 49th 20-win season. Norman Powell led the team in scoring with 16.4 points per game, followed by Bryce Alford with 15.4 points per game.

== Off-season ==
=== Departures ===
Name	Number	Pos.	Height	Weight	Year	Hometown	Notes
Norman Powell	4	G	6'4"	215	Senior	San Diego, California	Graduated
David Brown	13	G	6'3"	185	Senior	Anaheim Hills, California	Walk-on; Graduated
Kory Alford	2	G	6'4"	185	RS Junior	Albuquerque, New Mexico	Walk-on; Graduated
Nick Kazemi	0	G	6'3"	210	RS Junior	Santa Ana, California	Walk-on; Graduated
Wanaah Bail	1	F	6'9"	215	Sophomore	Houston, Texas	Transferred
Kevon Looney	5	F	6'9"	220	Freshman	Milwaukee, Wisconsin	Declared for 2015 NBA draft

=== Incoming transfers ===
Name	Number	Pos.	Height	Weight	Year	Hometown	Notes
Ikenna Okwarabizie	34	C	6'10"	245	Sophomore	Lagos, Nigeria	Junior college transfer from Tyler Junior College

=== 2015 recruiting class ===
College recruiting information
Name	Hometown	School	Height	Weight	Commit date
Aaron Holiday #15 PG	North Hollywood, CA	Campbell Hall School	6 ft 0 in (1.83 m)	175 lb (79 kg)	Mar 3, 2014
Aaron Holiday #15 PG	Recruit ratings: Scout: Rivals: 247Sports: ESPN:				
Prince Ali #12 SG	Pembroke Pines, FL	Sagemont School	6 ft 4 in (1.93 m)	180 lb (82 kg)	Aug 16, 2014
Prince Ali #12 SG	Recruit ratings: Scout: Rivals: 247Sports: ESPN:				
Alex Olesinski; F	Roswell, NM	La Lumiere School	6 ft 10 in (2.08 m)	200 lb (91 kg)	Mar 4, 2015
Alex Olesinski; F	Recruit ratings: Scout: Rivals: 247Sports: ESPN:				
Overall recruit ranking:
Note: In many cases, Scout, Rivals, 247Sports, On3, and ESPN may conflict in their listings of height and weight.; In these cases, the average was taken. ESPN grades are on a 100-point scale.; Sources: "2015 Player Commits". ESPN.; "2015 Team Ranking". Rivals.

== Roster ==
2015–16 UCLA Bruins men's basketball team
Players
Coaches

Pos.	#	Name	Height	Weight	Year	Previous school	Hometown
F	0	Alex Olesinski	6 ft 10 in (2.08 m)	200 lb (91 kg)	Fr	La Lumiere School	Roswell, New Mexico
G	1	Wonder Smith (W)	6 ft 1 in (1.85 m)	180 lb (82 kg)	Fr	Windward School	Los Angeles, California
G/F	2	Noah Allen	6 ft 7 in (2.01 m)	215 lb (98 kg)	Jr	Palma HS	Pacific Grove, California
G	3	Aaron Holiday	6 ft 1 in (1.85 m)	185 lb (84 kg)	Fr	Campbell Hall School	North Hollywood, California
G	5	Prince Ali	6 ft 3 in (1.91 m)	190 lb (86 kg)	Fr	Sagemont School	Pembroke Pines, Florida
G	10	Isaac Hamilton	6 ft 5 in (1.96 m)	195 lb (88 kg)	Jr	St. John Bosco HS	Los Angeles, California
F	14	György Golomán	6 ft 11 in (2.11 m)	215 lb (98 kg)	So	The Sagemont School	Körmend, Hungary
G	15	Jerrold Smith (W)	6 ft 0 in (1.83 m)	165 lb (75 kg)	Jr	St. Bernard HS	Los Angeles, California
G	20	Bryce Alford	6 ft 3 in (1.91 m)	185 lb (84 kg)	Jr	La Cueva HS	Albuquerque, New Mexico
G	21	Alec Wulff (W)	6 ft 3 in (1.91 m)	185 lb (84 kg)	So	Laguna Beach HS	Laguna Beach, California
G	22	Gabriel Bell-Williams (W)	6 ft 5 in (1.96 m)	175 lb (79 kg)	Fr	Campbell Hall School	Toronto, Ontario
F/C	23	Tony Parker	6 ft 9 in (2.06 m)	260 lb (118 kg)	Sr	Miller Grove HS	Atlanta, Georgia
G	24	Justis Bell-Williams (W)	6 ft 4 in (1.93 m)	170 lb (77 kg)	Fr	Campbell Hall School	Toronto, Ontario
C	34	Ikenna Okwarabizie	6 ft 9 in (2.06 m)	250 lb (113 kg)	So	East HS/Tyler Junior College	Lagos, Nigeria
C	40	Thomas Welsh	7 ft 0 in (2.13 m)	245 lb (111 kg)	So	Loyola HS	Redondo Beach, California
G/F	43	Jonah Bolden	6 ft 10 in (2.08 m)	220 lb (100 kg)	So	Brewster Academy	Sydney, Australia

Head coach

- Steve Alford (Indiana)

Assistant coach(es)

- Ed Schilling (Miami (OH))
- Duane Broussard (Bradley)
- David Grace (Park)

Legend

- (C) Team captain
- (S) Suspended
- (I) Ineligible
- (W) Walk-on
- Injured
- Current redshirt

Roster
Last update: November 13, 2015

== Schedule ==
UCLA's 2015–16 schedule includes home games against Kentucky, Long Beach State, Pepperdine, Cal Poly, Louisiana-Lafayette, Monmouth, Cal State Northridge, and McNeese State. UCLA will travel to play at Gonzaga and face off against North Carolina at a neutral venue. The Bruins will also make a trip to play three of the following in the Maui Invitational: Kansas, Indiana, St. John's, UNLV, Vanderbilt, and Wake Forest.

During the Pac-12 Conference schedule, UCLA will play 18 games (9 home and 9 away) and will have home-and-homes with the following teams: Arizona, Arizona State, Oregon, Oregon State, USC, Washington, and Washington State. The Bruins will only play the Rocky Mountain teams (Colorado and Utah) at home. UCLA will also only play the Bay area teams (California and Stanford) on the road.

Date time, TV	Rank^{#}	Opponent^{#}	Result	Record	High points	High rebounds	High assists	Site (attendance) city, state
Exhibition
Oct 30*; 7:30 pm		Cal State Los Angeles	W 95–57	–	20 – Hamilton	11 – Bolden	7 – Alford	Pauley Pavilion (6,930); Los Angeles, CA
Non-conference regular season
Nov 13*; 8:00 pm, P12N		Monmouth	L 81–84 ^{OT}	0–1	22 – Alford	19 – Parker	5 – Alford	Pauley Pavilion (6,674); Los Angeles, CA
Nov 15*; 7:00 pm, P12N		Cal Poly; Maui Invitational Opening Round	W 88–83	1–1	22 – Welsh	14 – Parker	8 – Alford	Pauley Pavilion (6,595); Los Angeles, CA
Nov 19*; 7:30 pm, P12N		Pepperdine	W 81–67	2–1	19 – Alford	15 – Parker	5 – Tied	Pauley Pavilion (6,063); Los Angeles, CA
Nov 23*; 8:30 pm, ESPN2		vs. UNLV; Maui Invitational Quarterfinals	W 77–75	3–1	20 – Tied	8 – Welsh	4 – Bolden	Lahaina Civic Center (2,400); Maui, HI
Nov 24*; 7:00 pm, ESPN		vs. No. 5 Kansas; Maui Invitational Semifinals	L 73–92	3–2	19 – Hamilton	8 – Parker	3 – Holiday	Lahaina Civic Center (2,400); Maui, HI
Nov 25*; 4:30 pm, ESPN2		vs. Wake Forest; Maui Invitational 3rd Place Game	L 77–80	3–3	18 – Tied	15 – Parker	7 – Alford	Lahaina Civic Center (2,400); Maui, HI
Nov 29*; 4:00 pm, P12N		Cal State Northridge	W 77–45	4–3	14 – Tied	11 – Parker	10 – Alford	Pauley Pavilion (6,193); Los Angeles, CA
Dec 3*; 6:00 pm, ESPN		No. 1 Kentucky	W 87–77	5–3	21 – Welsh	11 – Welsh	7 – Holiday	Pauley Pavilion (12,202); Los Angeles, CA
Dec 6*; 6:00 pm, P12N		Long Beach State	W 83–76	6–3	24 – Alford	10 – Tied	7 – Holiday	Pauley Pavilion (6,443); Los Angeles, CA
Dec 12*; 7:00 pm, ESPN2		at No. 20 Gonzaga	W 71–66	7–3	20 – Hamilton	11 – Bolden	5 – Holiday	McCarthey Athletic Center (6,000); Spokane, WA
Dec 15*; 6:00 pm, P12N	No. 22	Louisiana–Lafayette	W 89–80	8–3	27 – Alford	9 – Parker	7 – Alford	Pauley Pavilion (5,460); Los Angeles, CA
Dec 19*; 10:00 am, CBS	No. 22	vs. No. 11 North Carolina; CBS Sports Classic	L 76–89	8–4	23 – Hamilton	11 – Parker	4 – Alford	Barclays Center (16,311); Brooklyn, NY
Dec 22*; 8:00 pm, P12N		McNeese State	W 67–53	9–4	18 – Hamilton	14 – Welsh	8 – Alford	Pauley Pavilion (6,499); Los Angeles, CA
Pac-12 regular season
Jan 1; 8:00 pm, FS1	No. 25	at Washington	L 93–96 ^{2OT}	9–5 (0–1)	30 – Alford	15 – Welsh	5 – Hamilton	Alaska Airlines Arena (6,920); Seattle, WA
Jan 3; 6:30 pm, P12N	No. 25	at Washington State	L 78–85	9–6 (0–2)	27 – Hamilton	10 – Welsh	5 – Alford	Beasley Coliseum (1,912); Pullman, WA
Jan 7; 6:00 pm, ESPN2		No. 7 Arizona; Rivalry	W 87–84	10–6 (1–2)	25 – Alford	12 – Parker	6 – 3 tied	Pauley Pavilion (12,026); Los Angeles, CA
Jan 9; 2:00 pm, P12N		Arizona State	W 81–74	11–6 (2–2)	26 – Hamilton	16 – Welsh	5 – Tied	Pauley Pavilion (9,973); Los Angeles, CA
Jan 13; 8:00 pm, ESPN2		USC; Rivalry	L 75–89	11–7 (2–3)	27 – Parker	12 – Parker	8 – Hamilton	Pauley Pavilion (12,993); Los Angeles, CA
Jan 20; 8:00 pm, ESPNU		at Oregon State	W 82–73	12–7 (3–3)	25 – Hamilton	5 – Alford	12 – Welsh	Gill Coliseum (5,321); Corvallis, OR
Jan 23; 1:00 pm, CBS		at Oregon	L 72–86	12–8 (3–4)	19 – Holiday	8 – Welsh	6 – Alford	Matthew Knight Arena (10,525); Eugene, OR
Jan 28; 7:00 pm, FS1		Washington	L 84–86	12–9 (3–5)	28 – Alford	11 – Bolden	6 – Alford	Pauley Pavilion (6,843); Los Angeles, CA
Jan 30; 4:00 pm, P12N		Washington State	W 83–50	13–9 (4–5)	22 – Hamilton	10 – Welsh	6 – Hamilton	Pauley Pavilion (9,024); Los Angeles, CA
Feb 4; 7:30 pm, P12N		at USC; Rivalry	L 61–80	13–10 (4–6)	15 – Holiday	12 – Welsh	7 – Alford	Galen Center (10,258); Los Angeles, CA
Feb 12; 6:00 pm, ESPN		at No. 17 Arizona; Rivalry	L 75–81	13–11 (4–7)	24 – Hamilton	10 – Parker	4 – Tied	McKale Center (14,644); Tucson, AZ
Feb 14; 5:30 pm, ESPNU		at Arizona State	W 78–65	14–11 (5–7)	16 – Bolden	9 – Bolden	11 – Alford	Wells Fargo Arena (6,710); Tempe, AZ
Feb 18; 7:00 pm, ESPN2		Utah	L 73–75	14–12 (5–8)	25 – Hamilton	6 – Welsh	6 – Holiday	Pauley Pavilion (7,249); Los Angeles, CA
Feb 20; 8:00 pm, FS1		Colorado	W 77–53	15–12 (6–8)	22 – Hamilton	6 – Tied	9 – Alford	Pauley Pavilion (8,492); Los Angeles, CA
Feb 25; 6:00 pm, ESPN2		at California	L 63–75	15–13 (6–9)	15 – Tied	16 – Welsh	5 – Holiday	Haas Pavilion (11,858); Berkeley, CA
Feb 27; 1:30 pm, FOX		at Stanford	L 70–79	15–14 (6–10)	20 – Alford	9 – Welsh	6 – Holiday	Maples Pavilion (6,364); Stanford, CA
Mar 2; 6:00 pm, ESPN2		No. 9 Oregon	L 68–76	15–15 (6–11)	19 – Hamilton	7 – Welsh	6 – Hamilton	Pauley Pavilion (6,578); Los Angeles, CA
Mar 5; 3:30 pm, P12N		Oregon State	L 82–86	15–16 (6–12)	21 – Hamilton	12 – Welsh	5 – Alford	Pauley Pavilion (7,940); Los Angeles, CA
Pac-12 Tournament
Mar 9; 6:00 pm, P12N	No. (10)	vs. (7) USC; First round	L 71–95	15–17	12 – Welsh	6 – Welsh	6 – Hamilton	MGM Grand Garden Arena (12,916); Paradise, NV
*Non-conference game. ^{#}Rankings from AP Poll. (#) Tournament seedings in parentheses. All times are in Pacific Time.

== Ranking movement ==
Ranking movement Legend: ██ Increase in ranking. ██ Decrease in ranking. RV = Received votes. NV = Received no votes.
Poll	Pre	Wk 2	Wk 3	Wk 4	Wk 5	Wk 6	Wk 7	Wk 8	Wk 9	Wk 10	Wk 11	Wk 12	Wk 13	Wk 14	Wk 15	Wk 16	Wk 17	Wk 18	Post	Final
AP	RV	NV	NV	NV	RV	22	RV	25	NV	RV	NV	NV	NV	NV	NV	NV	NV	NV		N/A
Coaches	RV	NV	NV	NV	RV	RV	RV	RV	NV	RV	NV	NV	NV	NV	NV	NV	NV	NV		

== See also ==
- List of UCLA Bruins in the NBA

== Notes ==
- December 7, 2015 – Thomas Welsh was named Pac-12 Player of the Week
- January 11, 2016 – Bryce Alford was named Pac-12 Player of the Week
- March 5, 2016 – Forward/center Tony Parker was honored on Senior Day
- March 24, 2016 – Sophomore center Thomas Welsh was named to the second-team Pac-12 All-Academic team
