= 2015–16 Oregon State Beavers men's basketball team =

American college basketball season

2015–16 Oregon State Beavers men's basketball

NCAA tournament, First Round
- Conference: Pac-12 Conference
- Record: 19–13 (9–9 Pac-12)
- Head coach: Wayne Tinkle (2nd season)
- Assistant coaches: Kerry Rupp; Gregg Gottlieb; Stephen Thompson
- Home arena: Gill Coliseum

2015–16 Pac-12 Conference men's basketball standings
	Conf.				Overall
Team	W		L	PCT	W		L	PCT
No. 5 Oregon †	14	–	4	.778	31	–	7	.816
No. 13 Utah	13	–	5	.722	27	–	9	.750
No. 17 Arizona	12	–	6	.667	25	–	9	.735
No. 23 California	12	–	6	.667	23	–	11	.676
Colorado	10	–	8	.556	22	–	12	.647
USC	9	–	9	.500	21	–	13	.618
Oregon State	9	–	9	.500	19	–	13	.594
Washington	9	–	9	.500	19	–	15	.559
Stanford	8	–	10	.444	15	–	15	.500
UCLA	6	–	12	.333	15	–	17	.469
Arizona State	5	–	13	.278	15	–	17	.469
Washington State	1	–	17	.056	9	–	22	.290
† Pac-12 Tournament winner Rankings from AP poll

The 2015–16 Oregon State Beavers men's basketball team represented Oregon State University in the 2015–16 NCAA Division I men's basketball season. The Beavers were led by second-year head coach Wayne Tinkle, and played their home games at Gill Coliseum in Corvallis, Oregon as members of the Pac-12 Conference. The Beavers finished the season 19–13, 9–9 in Pac-12 play to finish in a three-way tie for sixth place. They defeated Arizona State in the first round of the Pac-12 tournament before losing to California in the quarterfinals. OSU received an at-large bid to the NCAA tournament as the No. 7 seed in the West Region, marking the Beavers' first NCAA Tournament appearance since 1990. The Beavers lost in the first round of the tournament to VCU.

== Previous season ==
The Beavers finished the 2014–15 season 17–14, 8–10 in Pac-12 play to finish in seventh place. OSU lost to Colorado in the first round of the Pac-12 tournament. They received an invitation to the College Basketball Invitational tournament, but declined.

== Off-season ==
=== Departures ===
Name	Number	Pos.	Height	Weight	Year	Hometown	Notes
Victor Robbins	4	G/F	6'7"	197	Junior	Compton, California	Dismissed from team

=== 2015 recruiting class ===
College recruiting
Name	Hometown	School	Height	Weight	Commit date
Drew Eubanks; C	Troutdale, OR	Reynolds High School	6 ft 9 in (2.06 m)	215 lb (98 kg)	Aug 26, 2014
Drew Eubanks; C	Recruit ratings: Scout: Rivals: 247Sports: ESPN:				
Stephen Thompson Jr. SG	Torrance, CA	Bishop Montgomery High School	6 ft 4 in (1.93 m)	165 lb (75 kg)	Sep 2, 2014
Stephen Thompson Jr. SG	Recruit ratings: Scout: Rivals: 247Sports: ESPN:				
Tres Tinkle; SF	Missoula, MT	Hellgate High School	6 ft 7 in (2.01 m)	215 lb (98 kg)	Sep 2, 2014
Tres Tinkle; SF	Recruit ratings: Scout: Rivals: 247Sports: ESPN:				
Derrick Bruce; PG	Orlando, FL	West Oaks Academy	6 ft 3 in (1.91 m)	165 lb (75 kg)	Sep 2, 2014
Derrick Bruce; PG	Recruit ratings: Scout: Rivals: 247Sports: ESPN:				
Gligorije Rakocevic; C	Montebello, CA	Cantwell-Sacred Heart of Mary High School	6 ft 10 in (2.08 m)	250 lb (110 kg)	Nov 11, 2014
Gligorije Rakocevic; C	Recruit ratings: Scout: Rivals: 247Sports: ESPN:				
Noah Togiai; SF	West Valley City, UT	Hunter High School	6 ft 5 in (1.96 m)	215 lb (98 kg)	Feb 3, 2015
Noah Togiai; SF	Recruit ratings: Scout: Rivals: 247Sports: ESPN:				
Overall recruit ranking:
Note: In many cases, Scout, Rivals, 247Sports, On3, and ESPN may conflict in their listings of height and weight.; In these cases, the average was taken. ESPN grades are on a 100-point scale.; Sources:

== Roster ==
2015–16 Oregon State Beavers men's basketball team
Players
Coaches

Pos.	#	Name	Height	Weight	Year	Hometown
G	1	Gary Payton II	6 ft 3 in (1.91 m)	190 lb (86 kg)	Sr	Las Vegas, Nevada
G	2	Stephen Thompson Jr.	6 ft 4 in (1.93 m)	170 lb (77 kg)	Fr	Torrance, California
F	3	Tres Tinkle	6 ft 8 in (2.03 m)	220 lb (100 kg)	Fr	Missoula, Montana
G	4	Derrick Bruce	6 ft 3 in (1.91 m)	165 lb (75 kg)	Fr	Orlando, Florida
C	5	Cheikh N'diaye	7 ft 0 in (2.13 m)	240 lb (109 kg)	Jr	Dakar, Senegal
G	11	Malcolm Duvivier	6 ft 2 in (1.88 m)	210 lb (95 kg)	Jr	Toronto, Ontario
C	12	Drew Eubanks	6 ft 10 in (2.08 m)	240 lb (109 kg)	Fr	Troutdale, Oregon
G	13	Langston Morris-Walker	6 ft 5 in (1.96 m)	215 lb (98 kg)	Sr	Berkeley, California
F	14	Daniel Gomis	6 ft 10 in (2.08 m)	230 lb (104 kg)	RS Sr	Thiès, Senegal
C	23	Gligorije Rakocevic	6 ft 11 in (2.11 m)	250 lb (113 kg)	Fr	Montebello, California
F	30	Olaf Schaftenaar	6 ft 10 in (2.08 m)	235 lb (107 kg)	Sr	Utrecht, Netherlands
F	31	Matt Dahlen (W)	6 ft 6 in (1.98 m)	205 lb (93 kg)	RS So	Redmond, Oregon
F	32	Jarmal Reid	6 ft 7 in (2.01 m)	235 lb (107 kg)	Sr	Decatur, Georgia
C	40	Justin Stangel	6 ft 10 in (2.08 m)	225 lb (102 kg)	Jr	Milwaukie, Oregon

Head coach

- Wayne Tinkle (Montana)

Assistant coach(es)

- Kerry Rupp
- Gregg Gottlieb
- Stephen Thompson

Legend

- (C) Team captain
- (S) Suspended
- (I) Ineligible
- (W) Walk-on
- Injured
- Current redshirt

Roster
Last update: June 24, 2015

== Schedule ==
Date time, TV	Rank^{#}	Opponent^{#}	Result	Record	Site (attendance) city, state
Exhibition
Nov. 5*; 5:00 pm, P12N		Western Oregon	W 76–57		Gill Coliseum (4,725); Corvallis, OR
Non-conference regular season
Nov. 14*; 4:30 pm, P12N		Northwest Christian; Beaver Showcase	W 74–52	1–0	Gill Coliseum (4,594); Corvallis, OR
Nov. 17*; 7:00 pm, P12N		Iona; Beaver Showcase	W 93–73	2–0	Gill Coliseum (4,344); Corvallis, OR
Nov. 19*; 6:00 pm		at Rice	W 77–69	3–0	Tudor Fieldhouse (1,981); Houston, TX
Nov. 21*; 2:00 pm		at UC Santa Barbara	W 71–59	4–0	The Thunderdome (2,108); Santa Barbara, CA
Nov. 24*; 6:00 pm, P12N		Valparaiso; Beaver Showcase	L 57–63	4–1	Gill Coliseum (5,235); Corvallis, OR
Dec. 2*; 7:00 pm, P12N		Loyola Marymount	W 79–70	5–1	Gill Coliseum (4,576); Corvallis, OR
Dec. 5*; 1:00 pm, P12N		Nevada	W 66–62	6–1	Gill Coliseum (4,891); Corvallis, OR
Dec. 12*; 5:00 pm, ESPN2		vs. No. 2 Kansas; Kansas City Shootout	L 67–82	6–2	Sprint Center (18,612); Kansas City, MO
Dec. 18*; 8:00 pm, P12N		vs. Cal State Fullerton; Far West Classic	W 82–69	7–2	Moda Center (8,032); Portland, OR
Dec. 19*; 8:00 pm, P12N		vs. Tulsa; Far West Classic	W 76–71	8–2	Moda Center (8,555); Portland, OR
Dec. 21*; 6:00 pm, P12N		Quinnipiac	W 82–61	9–2	Gill Coliseum (4,455); Corvallis, OR
Pac-12 regular season
Jan. 3; 4:00 pm, FS1		Oregon; Civil War	W 70–57	10–2 (1–0)	Gill Coliseum (9,604); Corvallis, OR
Jan. 6; 8:00 pm, ESPNU		Stanford	L 72–78	10–3 (1–1)	Gill Coliseum (5,563); Corvallis, OR
Jan. 9; 6:30 pm, P12N		California	W 77–71	11–3 (2–1)	Gill Coliseum (7,208); Corvallis, OR
Jan. 13; 8:00 pm, ESPNU		at Colorado	L 54–71	11–4 (2–2)	Coors Events Center (9,190); Boulder, CO
Jan. 17; 5:30 pm, ESPNU		at Utah	L 53–59	11–5 (2–3)	Jon M. Huntsman Center (12,417); Salt Lake City, UT
Jan. 20; 8:00 pm, ESPNU		UCLA	L 73–82	11–6 (2–4)	Gill Coliseum (5,321); Corvallis, OR
Jan. 24; 12:00 pm, P12N		No. 21 USC	W 85–70	12–6 (3–4)	Gill Coliseum (7,020); Corvallis, OR
Jan. 28; 5:30 pm, P12N		at Arizona State	L 68–86	12–7 (3–5)	Wells Fargo Arena (6,074); Tempe, AZ
Jan. 30; 6:30 pm, P12N		at No. 18 Arizona	L 63–80	12–8 (3–6)	McKale Center (14,644); Tucson, AZ
Feb. 4; 8:00 pm, ESPN2		Utah	W 71–69	13–8 (4–6)	Gill Coliseum (5,242); Corvallis, OR
Feb. 6; 5:30 pm, P12N		Colorado	W 60–56	14–8 (5–6)	Gill Coliseum (6,517); Corvallis, OR
Feb. 11; 8:00 pm, FS1		at Stanford	W 62–50	15–8 (6–6)	Maples Pavilion (4,519); Stanford, CA
Feb. 13; 3:30 pm, P12N		at California	L 71–83	15–9 (6–7)	Haas Pavilion (10,906); Berkeley, CA
Feb. 20; 7:00 pm, P12N		at No. 16 Oregon; Civil War	L 81–91	15–10 (6–8)	Matthew Knight Arena (12,364); Eugene, OR
Feb. 24; 8:00 pm, ESPNU		Washington	W 82–81	16–10 (7–8)	Gill Coliseum (5,593); Corvallis, OR
Feb. 28; 3:30 pm, P12N		Washington State	W 69–49	17–10 (8–8)	Gill Coliseum (9,604); Corvallis, OR
Mar. 2; 8:00 pm, FS1		at USC	L 70–81	17–11 (8–9)	Galen Center (4,588); Los Angeles, CA
Mar. 5; 3:30 pm, P12N		at UCLA	W 86–82	18–11 (9–9)	Pauley Pavilion (7,940); Los Angeles, CA
Pac-12 tournament
Mar. 9; 8:30 pm, P12N	(6)	vs. (11) Arizona State; First Round	W 75–66	19–11	MGM Grand Garden Arena (12,916); Paradise, NV
Mar. 10; 8:30 pm, FS1	(6)	vs. (3) No. 24 California; Quarterfinals	L 68–76	19–12	MGM Grand Garden Arena (12,916); Paradise, NV
NCAA tournament
Mar. 18*; 10:30 am, TNT	(7 W)	vs. (10 W) VCU; First Round	L 67–75	19–13	Chesapeake Energy Arena (15,662); Oklahoma City, OK
*Non-conference game. ^{#}Rankings from AP Poll. (#) Tournament seedings in parentheses. W=West Region. All times are in Pacific Time.
