= Conor Clifford (basketball) =

American professional basketball player

Sun Rockers Shibuya
- Position: Team assistant
- League: B.League

Personal information
- Born: December 7, 1993 (age 32) Orange, California, U.S.
- Listed height: 7 ft 0 in (2.13 m)
- Listed weight: 260 lb (118 kg)

Career information
- High school: Ocean View (Huntington Beach, California)
- College: UC Irvine (2012–2013); Saddleback College (2014–2015); Washington State (2015–2017)
- NBA draft: 2017: undrafted
- Playing career: 2017–present

Career history
- 2017–2018: Ehime Orange Vikings
- 2018–2019: Shimane Susanoo Magic

Conor Masaji Clifford (born December 7, 1993) is an American professional basketball player for Sun Rockers Shibuya in Japan.

== Career statistics ==
Legend
GP	Games played	GS	Games started	MPG	Minutes per game
FG%	Field goal percentage	3P%	3-point field goal percentage	FT%	Free throw percentage
RPG	Rebounds per game	APG	Assists per game	SPG	Steals per game
BPG	Blocks per game	PPG	Points per game	**Bold**	Career high

Year	Team	GP	GS	MPG	FG%	3P%	FT%	RPG	APG	SPG	BPG	PPG
2017–18	Ehime	56	23	11.7	.609	.000	.660	3.1	.2	.1	.4	7.8
2018–19	Shimane	2	1	19.15	.688	.000	.750	4.0	1.0	.0	.0	12.5
