= Bishop O'Dowd =

Bishop O'Dowd may refer to:

- Bishop O'Dowd High School, a Catholic, co-educational, college preparatory school in Oakland, California
  - James Thomas O'Dowd, its namesake and an auxiliary bishop of the Archdiocese of San Francisco (1948-1950)
