= Jeremy Teicher =

American filmmaker (born 1988)

Jeremy Teicher (born July 26, 1988) is an American filmmaker known for blending fiction with reality. His filmmaking career began in college with the documentary short This is Us (2011) nominated for a Student Academy Award. Listed in Filmmaker Magazine as one of "25 New Faces of Independent Film", Teicher stated, "My deepest motivating factor for being a filmmaker is the ability to create a connection between people".

Teicher's feature films to date include Tall as the Baobab Tree (2012), Tracktown (2016), Olympic Dreams (2019) and Not An Artist (2023).

== Career ==
Teicher's filmmaking career began with the documentary short This is Us (2011) which he produced during his undergraduate studies at Dartmouth College. The film was nominated for a Student Academy Award.

Teicher then expanded this student project into his debut first feature Tall as the Baobab Tree (2012). Shot on location in Senegal in a rural village lacking electricity, the film is the first international film performed in Pulaar, a traditional West African language. The film circled the globe with distribution from Sundance Institute Artist Services and Visit Films. Keith Shiri of the British Film Institute called the film "an exquisitely performed and beautifully photographed drama that is a marvel to watch."

Teicher's second feature film, Tracktown (2016), is a coming-of-age film that premiered at the Los Angeles Film Festival. The film received support from the Sundance Institute Creative Producing Fellowship and the San Francisco Film Society Producing Initiative and was distributed by Orion Pictures Samuel Goldwyn Films.

Jeremy's third feature film, Olympic Dreams (2019), premiered at the South by Southwest (SXSW) festival, and was distributed by IFC Films. Notably, it is the first narrative feature film shot on location inside a real Olympic Village during the 2018 Olympics. In an interview with SXSW about his film, Teicher expressed, "We wanted to show what it feels like to be in the highly coveted Athlete Village at the most important moment in your life... all the while trying not to ask yourself, 'what happens next?'"

In 2023, Teicher directed Not An Artist with an ensemble cast including The RZA, Haley Joel Osment, Matt Walsh, and Alexi Pappas. The film premiered at the Austin Film Festival and was released by Utopia Distribution.

== Personal life ==
Teicher married athlete Alexi Pappas in June 2018. They were divorced in September 2023.

== Filmography ==
=== Film ===
Year	Title	Director	Writer	Producer	Notes
2012	Tall as the Baobab Tree	Yes	Yes	No	
2016	Tracktown	Yes	Yes	No	
2019	Olympic Dreams	Yes	Yes	No	Also cinematographer and sound recorder
2023	Not An Artist	Yes	Yes	No	

=== Short films ===
Year	Title	Director	Writer	Producer	Notes
2010	This is Us Stories from Senegalese Youth	Yes	No	Yes	Also editor
2010	Foursquare Day	Yes	Yes	No	Also editor and cinematographer
2013	Everquest Forever	Yes	Yes	No	Also editor and cinematographer
2020	Speed Goggles	Yes	Yes	No	Also editor and cinematographer

== Awards and nominations ==
- Student Academy Awards Nominee Achievement Award 2012 Documentary This is Us Stories from Senegalese Youth.
- 25 New Faces of Independent Film Filmmaker Magazine 2013.
- Best Feature Narrative: Doha-Tribeca Film Festival Doha-Giffoni Jury Tall as the Baobab Tree.
- Special Jury Mention for Best Artistic Achievement: Luxor African Film Festival 2014 Tall as the Baobab Tree.
- Nominee Golden Zenith Montreal Film Festival. 2012 Tall as the Baobab Tree.
- Nominee US Fiction Award Los Angeles Film Festival 2016 Tracktown.
- Winner Best Feature Film DaVinci Film Festival 2018 Tracktown
- Winner American Independent Award Best Feature Film. Denver Film Festival 2019 Olympic Dreams.
