= Denver Film Festival =

Film festival in Colorado

- Type: Incentive
- Industry: Film Festival
- Founded: 1978; United States
- Headquarters: United States
- Number of locations: Denver, Colorado

The Denver Film Festival is held in November, primarily at the Denver Film Center/Colfax, in Denver, Colorado, now the Anna and John J. Sie FilmCenter (Sie FilmCenter).

== Information ==
The festival features a selection of films, ranging from independent to commercial, including international films. The festival is currently managed by Denver Film.

Screenings occur at Denver Film's Sie theater, in addition to other venues such as the Denver Museum of Nature and Science and the AMC 9+ CO10. Larger premier events often occur in the Buell Theatre and Ellie Caulkins Opera House at the Denver Performing Arts Complex. Prior to 2012, it was held at the Tivoli Union on the Auraria Campus.

== History ==
The first festival was held on May 4, 1978, and featured such films as Annie Hall, The Fury, Close Encounters of the Third Kind, The Hills Have Eyes and Pretty Baby. The festival kicked off with a 90-minute clip compilation from Warner Bros. titled ‘The Movies That Made Us.’ The festival was originally conceived and founded by Peter Warren, Ph.D., then a professor of mathematics at the University of Denver and by Irene Clurman, then the art critic for the Rocky Mountain News. The first artistic director was Ron Hecht, the manager of the Vogue theatre.

In the early years, Ron Henderson served as marketing director and subsequently as artistic director. Henderson recalls "There were no red carpets and no television cameras out front. We did a ribbon cutting with Dick Lamm (then governor). When we got inside it was a full house at the Old Centre theater, which was demolished before the next year's festival. (The Centre sat 1,200.).

"Most notably, the weather was ominous - cloudy and cool. The opening-night party was at a private house and it was an invitational affair. When we got there, a cold rain was falling. We woke up the next morning, and there was a foot of wet snow on the ground, but it was springtime and by the end of the day, it was beautiful.

"The first festival obviously was very successful, so we decided to take it to a second year. It was really three years before we finally said, 'OK, this is a real thing, let's hire staff and incorporate as a nonprofit.' " Denerstein, Robert (2007-04-28). "Making up a mind-set". Rocky Mountain News.

== 28th Denver Film Festival ==
The 28th Starz Denver Film Festival was held November 10–20, 2005.

Award	Winner
John Cassavetes Award	Philip Baker Hall
Mayor's Career Achievement Award	Ang Lee
Stan Brakhage Vision Award	Robert Breer

Special tributes were given to Claude Lelouch and Ryuichi Hiroki. The festival also included a focus on Japanese Cinema.

In its early decades, the festival used multiple Denver venues. Early festival audiences moved between the Ogden, the Vogue, and the Esquire Theatre, with the Aladdin and the Denver Center Cinema added later. The Esquire served as a regular venue for the festival across multiple years, typically hosting the closing-night screening; closing films shown there included Charles Burnett's To Sleep with Anger (1990), John Sayles' City of Hope (1991), and screenings during the 15th festival (1992).

== 29th Denver Film Festival ==
The 29th Starz Denver Film Festival was held November 9–19, 2006 and featured 194 titles from 29 countries. 15 films were premiered. The festival was attended by 38,881 film goers and more than 180 filmmakers. The opening night film was 'Breaking and Entering' and the closing night film was Rescue Dawn. "29th Starz Denver Film Festival Jury and Audience Award Winners" (Press release). Denver Film Society. 2006-11-20.

Award	Winner
People's Choice for Best Feature	The Lives of Others
People's Choice for Best Documentary	The Trials of Darryl Hunt
People's Choice for Best Short	tie: Painful Glimpse Into My Writing Process (In Less Than 60 Seconds) & Big Girl
Emerging Filmmaker Award	The Last Romantic
The Maysles Brothers Award for Best Documentary	Kurt Cobain About A Son
Krzysztof Kieślowski Award for Best Feature Film	Beauty in Trouble
John Cassavetes Award	Tim Robbins
Mayor's Career Achievement Award	Anthony Minghella
Stan Brakhage Vision Award	George Kuchar

Special tributes were given to Vilmos Zsigmond, Wu Tian Ming, Scott Wilson and Allan King. The festival also included a focus on Canadian Cinema.

== 30th Denver Film Festival ==
The 30th Starz Denver Film Festival was held November 8 – 18, 2007. The official line-up was announced October 22.

== 31st Denver Film Festival ==
The 31st Starz Denver Film Festival was held November 13–23, 2008. The featured Red Carpet events were screenings of The Brothers Bloom, Slumdog Millionaire and Last Chance Harvey.

Award	Winner
Starz People's Choice Award for Narrative Feature	Katyń
Starz People's Choice Award for Documentary Feature	They Killed Sister Dorothy
Starz People's Choice Award for Short Film	Granny O'Grimm's Sleeping Beauty
Spike Lee Student Filmmaker Award	Multiple Choice
Maysles Brothers Award for Best Documentary	Another Planet
Krzysztof Kieślowski Award for Best Feature Film	Moscow, Belgium
Excellence in Acting Award	Richard Jenkins

== 32nd Denver Film Festival ==
The 32nd Denver Film Festival was held November 12–22, 2009. The featured Red Carpet films included Precious, The Last Station and The Young Victoria.

Award	Winner
John Cassavetes Award	J. K. Simmons
Excellence in Acting Award	Hal Holbrook
Mayor's Career Achievement Award	Ed Harris

== 33rd Denver Film Festival ==
Festival was held November 3–14, 2010. It screened over 200 films and included a Focus on Iranian Cinema. Red Carpet Events including a screening of Morning, Rabbit Hole, Casino Jack, 127 Hours and Black Swan. The festival was dedicated to director George Hickenlooper who died in Denver just days before his film Casino Jack screened at the Festival.

Award	Winner
John Cassavetes Award	Elliott Gould
Excellence in Acting Award	Aaron Eckhart
Mayor's Career Achievement Award	Danny Boyle
Stan Brakhage Vision Award	P. Adams Sitney
Rising Star Award	Kerry Bishé
Starz People's Choice Award for Feature Film	happythankyoumoreplease
Starz People's Choice Award for Documentary	Grace Paley: Collected Shorts
Starz People's Choice Award for Short Film	Keep Dancing
Krzysztof Kieślowski Award for Best Feature	The White Meadows
Maysles Brothers Award for Best Documentary	Secrets of the Tribe
Emerging Filmmaker Award	Fanny, Annie & Danny
Spike Lee Student Filmmaker Award	Dreams Awake
ASIFA-Colorado Award for the Best Animated Short	The Cow Who Wanted to be a Hamburger

== 34th Denver Film Festival ==
The 2011 Festival was held November 2–13, with 247 Films programmed, including a Focus on South Korean Cinema. Red Carpet screenings included Like Crazy, The Descendants, and The Artist. This was the last year the festival held screenings at the Starz Film Center on the Auraria Campus. The 2011 Award Winners are listed below.

Award	Winner
John Cassavetes Award	Judy Greer
Excellence in Acting Award	Alan Cumming
Mayor's Career Achievement Award	James Cromwell
Stan Brakhage Vision Award	Abigail Child
Rising Star Award	Adepero Oduye
Starz People's Choice Award for Feature Film	Kinyarwanda
Starz People's Choice Award for Documentary	TBA
Starz People's Choice Award for Short Film	TBA
Krzysztof Kieślowski Award for Best Feature	Volcano
Maysles Brothers Award for Best Documentary	You've Been Trumped
New Directors Award	Sophia Takal (Green)
Spike Lee Student Filmmaker Award	Huay-Bing Law's Benny
Liberty Global International Student Filmmaker Award	Ariel Kleiman's Deeper Than Yesterday
ASIFA-Colorado Award for the Best Animated Short	Patrick Doyon's Sunday

== 35th Denver Film Festival ==
The 2012 festival was held November 1–11. It included a Focus on the Cinema of Argentina with 13 Argentine films in the program. Red Carpet events included the opening night film A Late Quartet, Dustin Hoffman's directorial debut, Quartet and the closing night film, Silver Linings Playbook. Special events at the festival included tributes to Dutch filmmaker Mijke de Jong, Argentine filmmaker Daniel Burman, Boulder, Colorado, filmmaker Stacey Steers, and the Colorado filmmaking collective, Milkhaus. Celebrity guests who were present to receive festival awards or for special presentations included, Tippi Hedren, George A. Romero, Andy Garcia, Vince Vaughn and Jason Ritter. Additional screenings were held at the Denver Pavilions off of 16th Street Mall. The 2012 award winners are below.

== 36th Denver Film Festival ==
The 2013 festival was held November 6–17, with a focus on Dutch Cinema. Red carpet screenings included, Labor Day, Nebraska and August: Osage County. The 2013 award winners are below.

Award	Winner
John Cassavetes Award	Harry Dean Stanton
Excellence in Acting Award	
Mayor's Career Achievement Award	
Stan Brakhage Vision Award	
Rising Star Award	
Jack Gilford Award for Comedy	
George Hickenlooper Honorary Award	
Reel Social Club Indie Voice Award	Leo Fitzpatrick
Starz People's Choice Award for Feature Film	One Chance
Starz People's Choice Award for Documentary	Code Black
Starz People's Choice Award for Short Film	What Do We Have In Our Pockets?
Krzysztof Kieślowski Award for Best Feature	A Touch of Sin
Special Jury Award	The Fifth Season
Maysles Brothers Award for Best Documentary	The Search For Emak Bakia
New Directors Award	Daniel Patrick Carbone for Hide Your Smiling Faces
ASIFA-Colorado Award for the Best Animated Short	Thomas Stellmach for Virtuoso Virtual
Best Actor - Domestic Short	Luzer Twesky for Where is Joel Baum?

== 37th Denver Film Festival ==
The 2014 Starz Denver Film Festival was held November 12–23. The 2014 award winners are below.

Award	Winner
Starz People's Choice Award for Narrative Feature	Viva la libertà directed by Roberto Andò
Starz People's Choice Award for Documentary Feature	Capturing Grace directed by Dave Iverson
Starz People's Choice Award for Music Video	Irma, Save Me directed by Xavier Maingon
Starz People's Choice Award for Short Film	The Bravest, The Boldest directed by Moon Molson
Krzysztof Kieślowski Award for Best Foreign Feature Film	The Tribe (“Plemya”), directed by Miroslav Slaboshpitsky (Ukraine)
Special Jury Award	August Winds directed by Gabriel Mascaro (Brazil); Stations of the Cross directed by Dietrich Brüggemann (Germany)
Maysles Brothers Award for Best Documentary	The Look of Silence directed by Joshua Oppenheimer (USA)
The American Independent Award for Best Feature Film	The Midnight Swim directed by Sarah Adina Smith (USA)
ASIFA-Colorado Best Animated Short Award	Salmon Deadly Sins directed by Steven Vander Meer (USA)
The Liberty Global International Student Short Award	The Bigger Picture directed by Daisy Jacobs (United Kingdom)
The Spike Lee Student Filmmaker Award	A Grand Canal directed by Johnny Ma (USA)
Feature Screenplay Award	Little House written by Claire Fowler
Short Screenplay Award	Pelham Bay Park written by John Burdeaux

== 42nd Denver Film Festival (DFF42) ==
The 2019 Denver Film Festival was held from October 30 to November 10, 2019. After conclusion of the Festival, the following films were recognized as the Audience Award winners for the 42nd Denver Film Festival by a tally of ballots.

Award	Winner	Special Mention
Audience Award for Narrative Feature	The Conductor directed by Maria Peters	
Audience Award for Documentary Feature	3 Days 2 Nights directed by John Breen	
Audience Award for Music Video	Salvatore Ganacci, "Horse" directed by Vedran Rupic	
Audience Award for Short Subject Film	Palliative directed by John Beder	
Krzysztof Kieślowski Award for Best Feature Film	Song Without a Name (Cancion Sin Nombre), directed by Melina León (Peru)	The Invisible Life of Eurídice Gusmão, directed by Karim Aïnouz (Brazil)
Maysles Brothers Award for Best Documentary	Scheme Birds directed by Ellen Fiske, Ellinor Hallin (Scotland)	
American Independent Award for Best Feature Film	Swallow directed by Carlo Mirabella-Davis (USA)	Olympic Dreams directed by Jeremy Teicher (USA/South Korea)
Special Mention Jury Prize	Midnight Family directed by Luke Lorentzen (Mexico)	
Marilyn Marsh Saint-Veltri Award for Best Student Animated Short Film	Daughter directed by Daria Kashcheeva	Roadkill, directed by Leszek Mozga
The Liberty Global International Student Filmmaker Award	She-Pack directed by Fanny Ovesen	
The Liberty Global Domestic Student Filmmaker Award	The Clinic directed by Elivia Shaw	Dunya’s Day, directed by Raed Alsemari
Short Screenplay Award	Pelham Bay Park written by John Burdeaux	
Rare Pearl Award	Portrait of a Lady on Fire (Portrait de La Jeune Fille en Feu), directed by Céline Sciamma	

Awards previously given or announced:

Maria and Tommaso Maglione Italian Filmmaker Award

THE INVISIBLE WITNESS (IL TESTIMONE INVISIBILE) Director: Stefano Mordini

John Cassavetes Award Recipient:

RIAN JOHNSON

Stan Brakhage Vision Award Recipient:

VINCENT GRENIER

Brit Withey Artistic Director Fund Recipient:

GYÖRGY PÁLFI

== See also ==
- Starz
