= August Schram =

Swiss tenor (born 1979)

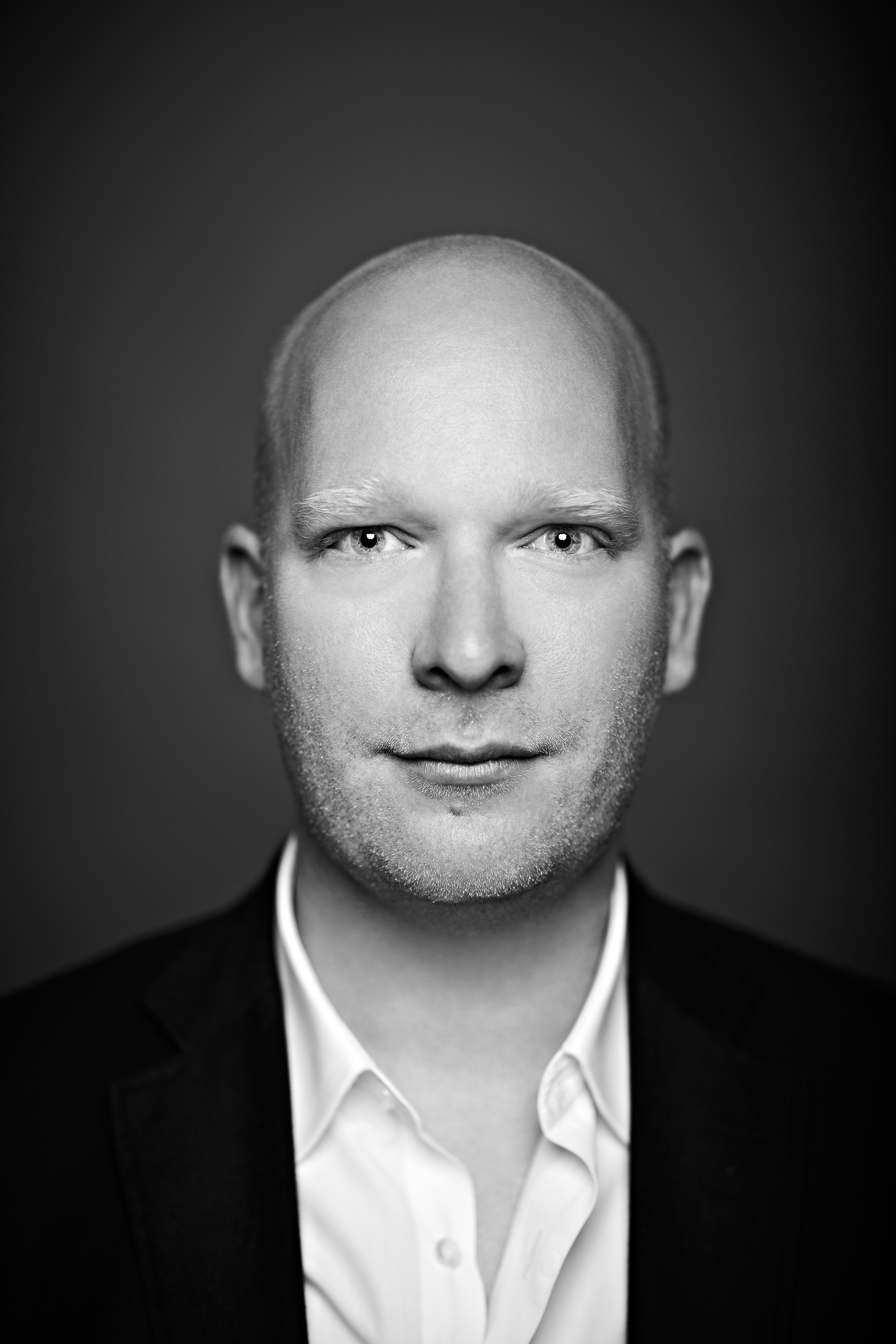
August Schram

August Johannes Schram (born December 22, 1979) is a Swiss tenor, born in Lucerne.

== Career ==
August Schram grew up in Küssnacht am Rigi and Zurich, where he later became a soloist in the Zurich Boys’ Choir. Since 2002, he has attended the Rostock University of Music and Theatre. His first engagement was in 2007 for the world premiere of Pamina lebt by Lothar Hensel with the Mittelsächsische Theater in Freiberg/Sachsen, followed by his first fixed engagements at the Stadttheater Gießen. In the following years, he performed oratorio concerts in the German speaking world, along with engagements at the Tyrol Festival in Erl, the Neuköllner Opera Berlin and at the Hamburger Alleetheater. In 2013, "MeTube: August sings Carmen 'Habanera'" won the Berlin Music Video Awards.

=== Film ===
- 2009: Producer, singer and actor in the short film Der Doppelgänger, based on the song of the same name by Heinrich Heine and Franz Schubert (directed by Stephanie Winter). Busan International Short Film Festival.
- 2011: Associate producer of the documentary Login 2 Life by Daniel Moshel. Preis des Kleinen Fernsehspiels by the ZDF.
- 2012: Singer, actor and producer of the music video MeTube, directed by Daniel Moshel, an interpretation of Habanera by Georges Bizet's Carmen. Deutscher Web Video Preis in the category ‘Epic’

== Awards and nominations ==
2016: Berlin Music Video Awards, nominated in the Best Experimental category for 'METUBE 2'

2021: Berlin Music Video Awards, winner in the Best Director category for MeTube 3: 'Una furtiva lagrima'
