= Berlin Music Video Awards =

Annual festival in Germany

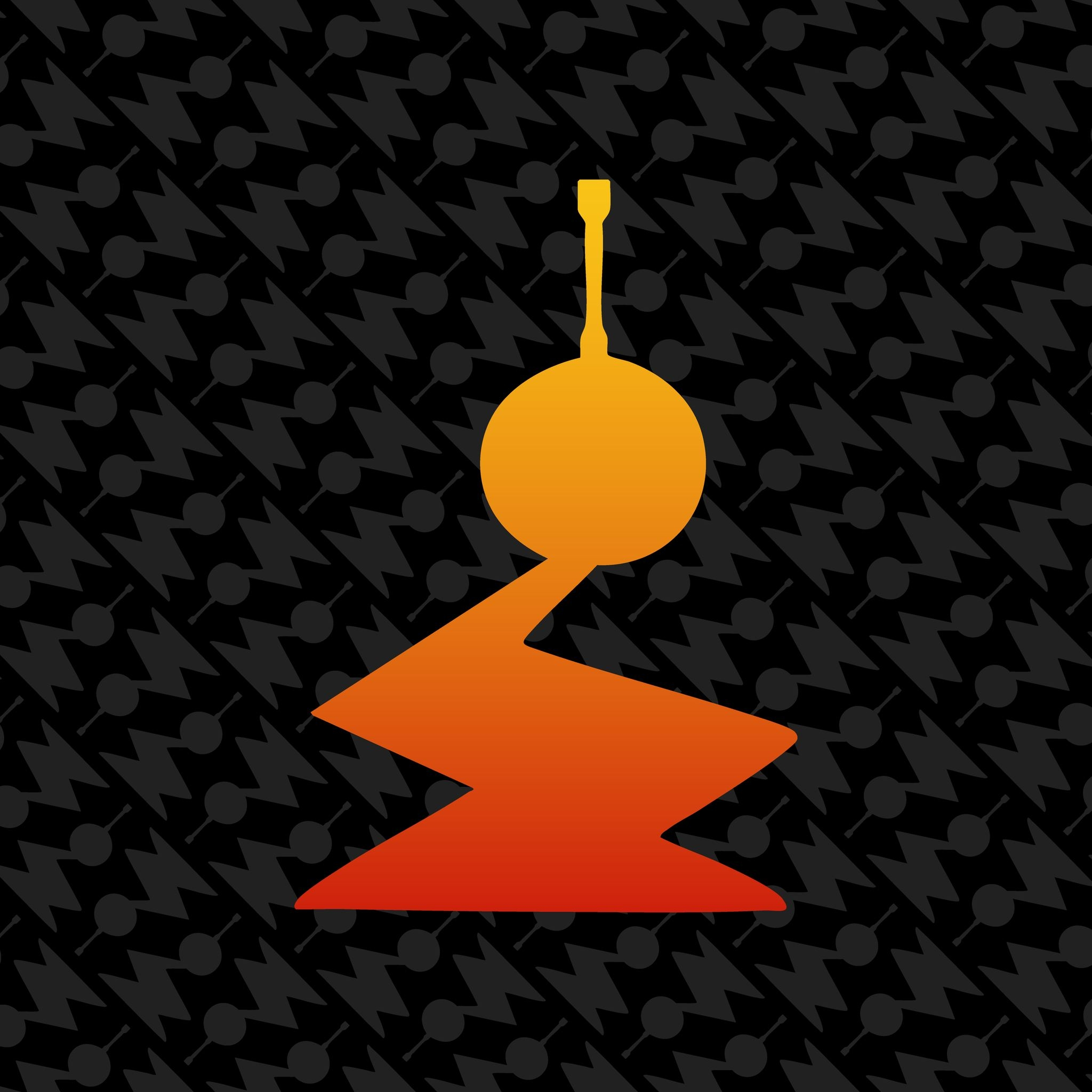
- Genre: Various
- Dates: May/June
- Locations: Berlin, Germany
- Years active: 2013–present
- Founders: Aviel Silook
- Website: www.berlinmva.com

The Berlin Music Video Awards is an annual international festival held in Berlin, Germany to celebrate the art of music videos. The festival brings together music video enthusiasts, directors, producers, and musicians worldwide to showcase their work and network with other professionals.

The festival includes a variety of activities such as screenings of nominated music videos, fashion show, various workshops, DJ sets and live performances. Awards are given in a variety of categories, including Best Music Video, Best Director, and Best Cinematography.

The Berlin Music Video Awards provide a platform for emerging artists and established professionals to showcase their work and gain recognition for their cinematographic creativity and skills. The BMVA highlights that anyone can participate, and that quality, originality, and diversity are all valued.

== History ==
Aviel Silook, the producer and manager, founded the Berlin Music Video Awards (BMVA) in 2013. The founder initiated the festival and award ceremony because the concept did not yet exist in Berlin. Initially, it was aimed to be local but in the first year of existence, it became international with participants from Europe and North America. More award categories have been added since then, and international recognition has grown. With the final award coming along with the prize of 6000 euros.

In the past, the Berlin Music Video Awards have featured a diverse range of nominees and jury members. Some of the notable nominees have included music videos by artists such as ASAP Rocky, Rammstein, Little Big, Coldplay and up-and-coming artists from around the world. However, winners are judged solely on the quality of their work, not their fame or fanbase, and that is what makes this festival truly inclusive. The jury has included industry professionals from various backgrounds, including directors, producers, musicians, and journalists. The Berlin Music Video Awards continue to attract a wide range of talented nominees and industry professionals each year.

The BMVA is distinguished by a diverse lineup that includes low-budget productions, newcomers, and internationally recognized artists. As a result, it highlights the state of the art in the current music video industry and recognizes outstanding productions.

Berlin Music Video Awards (2013–2023)
Year	Category		Name	Director
2013	Best Music Video	Winner	"MeTube (Carmen – Habanera)" by August Schram	Daniel Moshel
2014	Best Music Video	Winner	"Fear & Delight" by the Correspondents	Naren Wilks
2015	Best Music Video	Winner	"Can't help myself" by Brodinski Feat SD.	Megaforce
2016	Best Music Video	Winner	"Not Butter" by Dillon Francis	Brandon Dermer
2017	Best Music Video	Winner	"Kolshik" by Leningrad	lya Naishuller
2018	Best Music Video	Winner	"Не Париж (Not Paris)" by Leningrad	Pavel Sidorov
2019	Best Music Video	Winner	"We've got to try" by the Chemical Brothers	Ninian Doff
2020	Best Music Video	Winner	"Horse" by Salvatore Ganacci	Vedran Rupic
2021	Best Music Video	Winner	"Остин (Austin)" by Zemfira	Alexey Krupnik
2022	Best Music Video	Winner	"This is Not America" by Residente ft. Ibeyi	Greg Ohrel
2023	Best Music Video	Winner	Fatoumara Diawara ft. Damon – Nsera	Gregory Ohrel

Below there is full list of all the winners of the year 2024

Berlin Music Video Awards 2024
Category		Name	Director
Best Music Video	Winner	Gennre by Wynona	Phantom Directors, Etienne Baret
Best Animation	Winner	Too Late by Chinese Man Feat. Storgie T, Kt Gorique & FP	Victor Haegelin
Best Visual Effects	Winner	Wax on you by Reeve	Ataka51
Best Experimental	Winner	To the Body by Carla Massolini	Carla Massolini
Best Bizarre	Winner	Bogus Operandi by The Hives	Aube Perrie
Most Trashy	Winner	LA On Acid by Dillon Francis, Good Times Ahead	Parker Seaman
Best Editor	Winner	Mama’s Eyes by Mette	Camille Summers-Valli
Best Performer	Winner	Guillaume Poncelet by Yaki imo	James F. Coton
Best Concept	Winner	Skipping Like a Stone by The Chemical Brothers, Beck	Pensacola
Best Art Director	Winner	Self Control by Masstor	David Wilson
Best Song	Winner	Gennre by Wynona	Phantom Directors, Etienne Baret
Best Narrative	Winner	Ocean by Else	Mohamed Chabane & Théo Jourdain
Best Low Budget	Winner	see me 4 the first time by aLex vs aLex	Ana Vardi
Best Cinematography	Winner	De Selby (Part 2) by Hozier	Wolf James
Best Director	Winner	Träume Ohne Wert by Kalte Liebe	Florian Christopher
Best Production Company	Winner	Dissidence	

Below there is full list of all the winners of the year 2025

Berlin Music Video Awards 2025
Category		Name	Director
Best Music Video	Winner	Driving Around Looking For Unknown by Cero Ismael	Folkert Verdoorn & Simon Becks
Best Animation	Winner	feelslikeimfallinginlove by Coldplay	Raman Djafari
Best Visual Effects	Winner	Futurama 3 by Quebonafide	Andrzej Dragan, Patryk Gadaszewski, Pwee3000
Best Experimental	Winner	Half a Sadday Saving Time by Mola Oddity	Laurent Nathan Grey & Baku Hashimoto
Best Bizarre	Winner	Fresh Blood, Fresh Pussy by Witch Club Satan	Stian Andersen
Most Trashy	Winner	Untz Untz by Tommy Cash	Alina Pasok & Tommy Cash
Best Editor	Winner	Eusexua by FKA twigs	Charlie Von Rotberg
Best Performer	Winner	JellyKet by Dogshow	Rosie Terry Toogood
Best Concept	Winner	Show Me the Sky by Tommy Holohan & Megra	Will Wightman
Best Art Director	Winner	What If I Told You To by Wax Wings, Miha, Lucille Croft	Wax Wings
Best Song	Winner	Soul Mantra by Magnet Brain	Roma Shaglanov
Best Narrative	Winner	Patience (Sabali) by DJ Snake x Amadou et Mariam	Valentin Guiod
Best Low Budget	Winner	Dive by Corvad	Solomon
Best Cinematography	Winner	She’s Gone, Dance On by Disclosure	Jeff Bierman
Best Director	Winner	Driving Around Looking For Unknown by Cero Ismael	Folkert Verdoorn & Simon Becks
Best AI	Winner	Right Angle	Jordan Le Galeze
Best Production Company	Winner	Ocurens	

Below there is full list of all the winners of the year 2026

Berlin Music Video Awards 2026
Category	Name		Director
Best Music Video	Winner	Beat Bunny by Povoa x Madge	Tanner K Williams
Best Animation	Winner	Last Dance With Mary Jane by Snoop Dogg feat. Jelly Roll & Tom Petty	Dave Meyers
Best Visual Effects	Winner	Burnout Dynasty by Jasmine Sokko	Jyun Chang
Best Experimental	Winner	Starburst by Danny Brown	Ivo Beckett & James Topley
Best Bizarre	Winner	Bog Body by Viagra Boys	Eoin Glaister
Most Trashy	Winner	Bubblegum by Dacid Go8lin	Fjodor Carl Kelling & Ioan Gavriel
Best Editor	Winner	Losing Control by Belaria	Roso
Best Performer	Winner	Beat Bunny by Povoa x Madge	Tanner K Williams
Best Concept	Winner	PROZACZOPIXAN by VALD	Yanis De Andrade & Benjamin Setrouk
Best Art Director	Winner	iDi by MALIA NIMA	Levonika & Daniel Gordon
Best Song	Winner	Goth King by The Baxbys	Spencer Rosenfeld
Best Narrative	Winner	OPEN UP THAT DOOR by Weval, KILIMANJARO	Merijn Scholte Albers & Bear Damen
Best Low Budget	Winner	Robbery Rings by Archy Moor	Nico de Sola
Best Cinematography	Winner	DON'T WORRY by Coast Contra	Badr Ezzat
Best Director	Winner	Where's My Phone? by Mitski	Noel Paul
Best AI	Winner	Mapoas Only by Slim Soledad feat Clementaum	Bernardo Martins
Best Production Company	Winner	Stink Films	

== Program ==
Every year, the BMVA takes place for three consecutive days in May/June. The nominees and awardees of the various music video categories are presented during the ceremony, and the winners of each category are announced and awarded. The festival is usually held in one of Berlin's popular clubs, such as Club Gretchen (2019/2018) or Nuke Club (2017). After-show parties are organised in connection with the award ceremony.

The BMVA also provides individuals and professionals in the music industry a lot of networking opportunities. Through a variety of events participants can engage with like-minded artists, producers, directors, and other key industry figures.

In the years 2020 and 2021, the award ceremony took place digitally as a result of the global COVID-19 pandemic. The show was recorded at the KitKat Club(2020) and Alex Berlin (2021), who had been cooperating with the BMVA since its early years. In 2020/21, the hosts were Alexandrine Yetundey and David Hailey.

After two years of online editions, the Berlin Music Video Awards celebrated its 10th anniversary from 8 to 11 June (2022) in Club Gretchen.

=== Activities and festivities ===
==== Performances ====
The show consists of onstage live performances from renowned bands and musicians, like Little Big (band), Vitalic, and members of The Prodigy. While, Dj sets are also being held at the outdoor area of the festival, with names like Lawya and Jacques being on the decks.

Silver Screenings

One of the most prominent activities during the BMVA is the Silver Screenings, a showcase of music videos that, while not officially nominated, are still recognized for their creativity and artistic merit. In 2024, in the duration of the three days of the festival 160 videos were featured, and the number only grew in 2025, with 250 videos and their creators given the space to be acknowledged and celebrated.

After Party

During the festival, the BMVA hosts an annual after-party, which in recent years has been held at the KitKat Club. The event features themed attire, live performances, and social gatherings that extend the festival's programming.

Themed dress codes

Each day of the Berlin Music Video Awards features a different themed dress code, adding to the festival's dynamic and visually engaging atmosphere. One of the highlights is the Experimental Culture Day, known for its bold “Kinky Dress Code” theme. Other themes, such as “Glam & Glitter,” “All-White Elegance,” and “DIY & Sustainable Fashion,” reflect the event's ongoing emphasis on creativity, self-expression, and innovation.

Something extra that verified the events' creativity and authenticity was the creation of a tattoo zone at the 2025 awards, where winners could commemorate their achievement with a tattoo. The space was also open to the general attendees as well.

== Categories ==
Music Videos are awarded in the following categories at the BMVA:

- Best Music Video
- Best Animation
- Best Art Director
- Best Cinematography
- Best Editor
- Best Concept
- Best Director
- Best Experimental
- Best Low Budget
- Best Narrative
- Best Performer
- Best Production Company
- Best Song
- Best Visual Effects
- Most Bizarre
- Most Trashy
- Best AI Video

First-place winners in all categories receive a BMVA trophy, and the winner of the Best Music Video category receives a cash prize as well.

The Best AI category was introduced in the 2025 BMVA ceremony to celebrate innovative use of artificial intelligence in music video production and creative direction powered by AI.

The independent jury members are experts in their fields of the (music) video industry or previous awardees. Some of the jury members over the years have been Cheng-Hsu Chung, Alexander Dydyna and Federico Abib. With new additions being made every year.
