= Jasmine Guillory =

American romance novelist

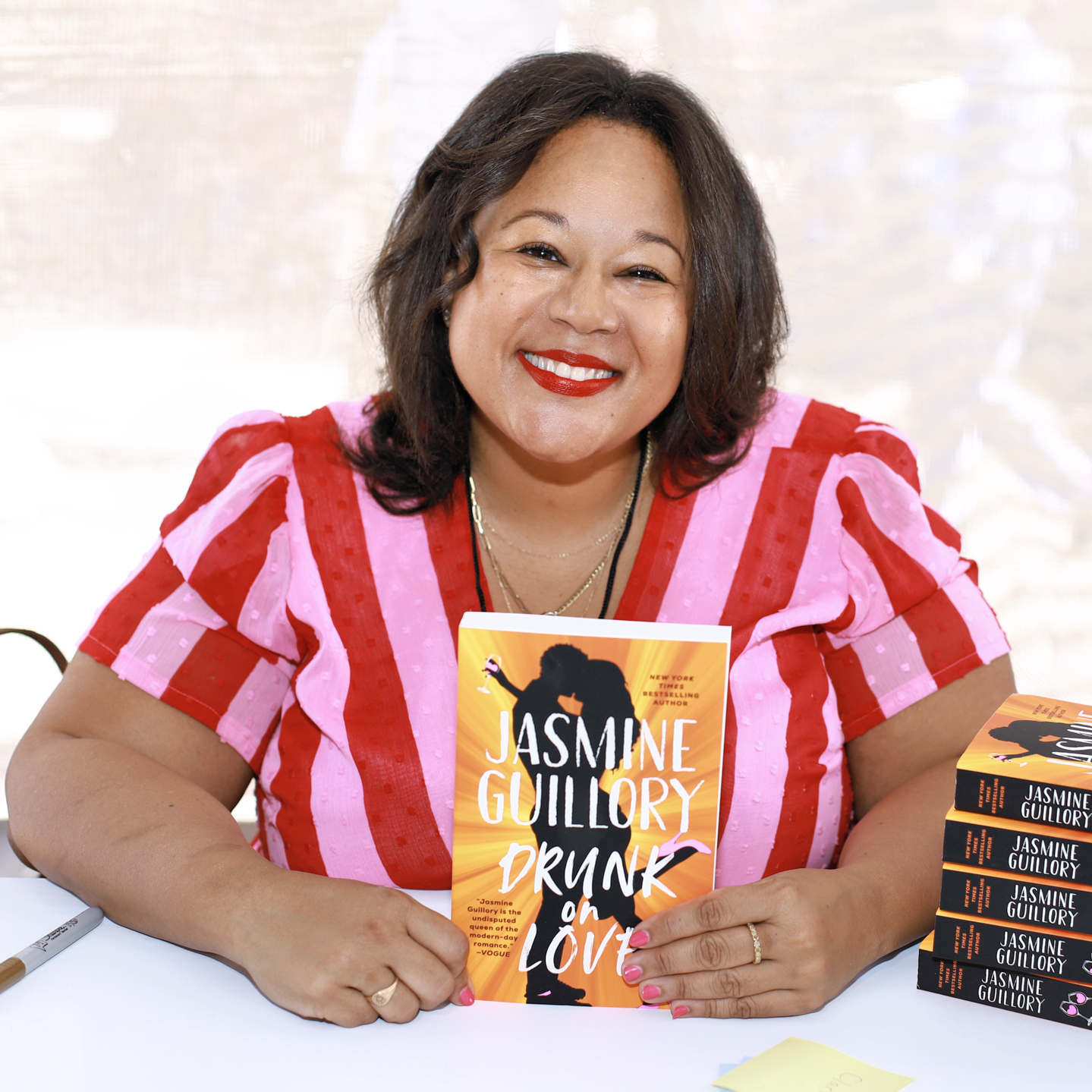
- Guillory at the 2022 Texas Book Festival
- Education: Bishop O'Dowd High School; Wellesley College; Stanford Law School
- Occupation: Novelist
- Writing career
- Genre: Romance
- Website: www.jasmineguillory.com

Jasmine Guillory is an American romance novelist. Her works' protagonists are often African-American professionals. In February 2019, her book, The Proposal, was ranked on The New York Times Best Seller list for paperback trade fiction.

== Education and early career ==
Guillory graduated from Bishop O'Dowd High School in Oakland, California in 1993. She then majored in history at Wellesley College in Wellesley, Massachusetts, graduating in 1997. After graduation, Guillory worked in Washington D.C. for two years before attending Stanford Law School. She graduated in 2002, and later clerked at a Federal District Court in San Francisco for two years before joining a law firm where she focused on securities and intellectual property.

== Writing career ==
In April 2015, Guillory began transitioning to a career as an author. She participated in National Novel Writing Month (NaNoWriMo), an annual writing project where she completed half of a book draft for her first published novel, The Wedding Date (2018). The book was noted in publications by Target, Elle Magazine, The Washington Post, and USA Today Bestsellers. Her subsequent novels include The Proposal (2018), The Wedding Party (2019), and Party of Two (2020). Her work features protagonists of color and addresses race throughout the storylines. According to Hannah Giorgis of The Atlantic, Guillory's writing frequently includes consent as a theme.

== Bibliography ==
- The Wedding Date (2018)
- The Proposal (2018)
- The Wedding Party (2019)
- Royal Holiday (2019)
- Party of Two (2020)
- While We Were Dating (2021)
- By the Book (2022)
- Drunk On Love (2022)
- Flirting Lessons (2025)

== Awards and reception ==
- 2018 - New York Public Library Best Books of 2018 – The Proposal and The Wedding Date
