= Tim Rubink =

German footballer

Personal information
- Date of birth: 12 January 1988 (age 38)
- Place of birth: Dormagen, West Germany
- Height: 1.88 m (6 ft 2 in)
- Position: Defender

Team information
- Current team: Goslarer SC

Youth career
- TuS Germania Hackenbroich
- TSV Norf
- Bayer Dormagen
- 2002–2007: Borussia Mönchengladbach

Senior career*
| Years | Team | Apps | (Gls) |
| 2006 | Borussia Mönchengladbach | 1 | (0) |
| 2007–2009 | Borussia Mönchengladbach II | 34 | (2) |
| 2009–2010 | Bayer 04 Leverkusen II | 25 | (0) |
| 2010–2011 | SV Sandhausen | | |
| 2011– | Goslarer SC | | |

International career
| | Germany U-19 | 2 | (0) |
- * Club domestic league appearances and goals as of 19:51, 21 January 2009 (UTC)

Tim Rubink (born 12 January 1988 in Dormagen) is a German former footballer.

== Career ==
He made his debut in the Fußball-Bundesliga for the main Borussia squad on 8 November 2006, when he started the game against FC Schalke 04 and was substituted at halftime.
