= Ivan Rabb =

American basketball player (born 1997)

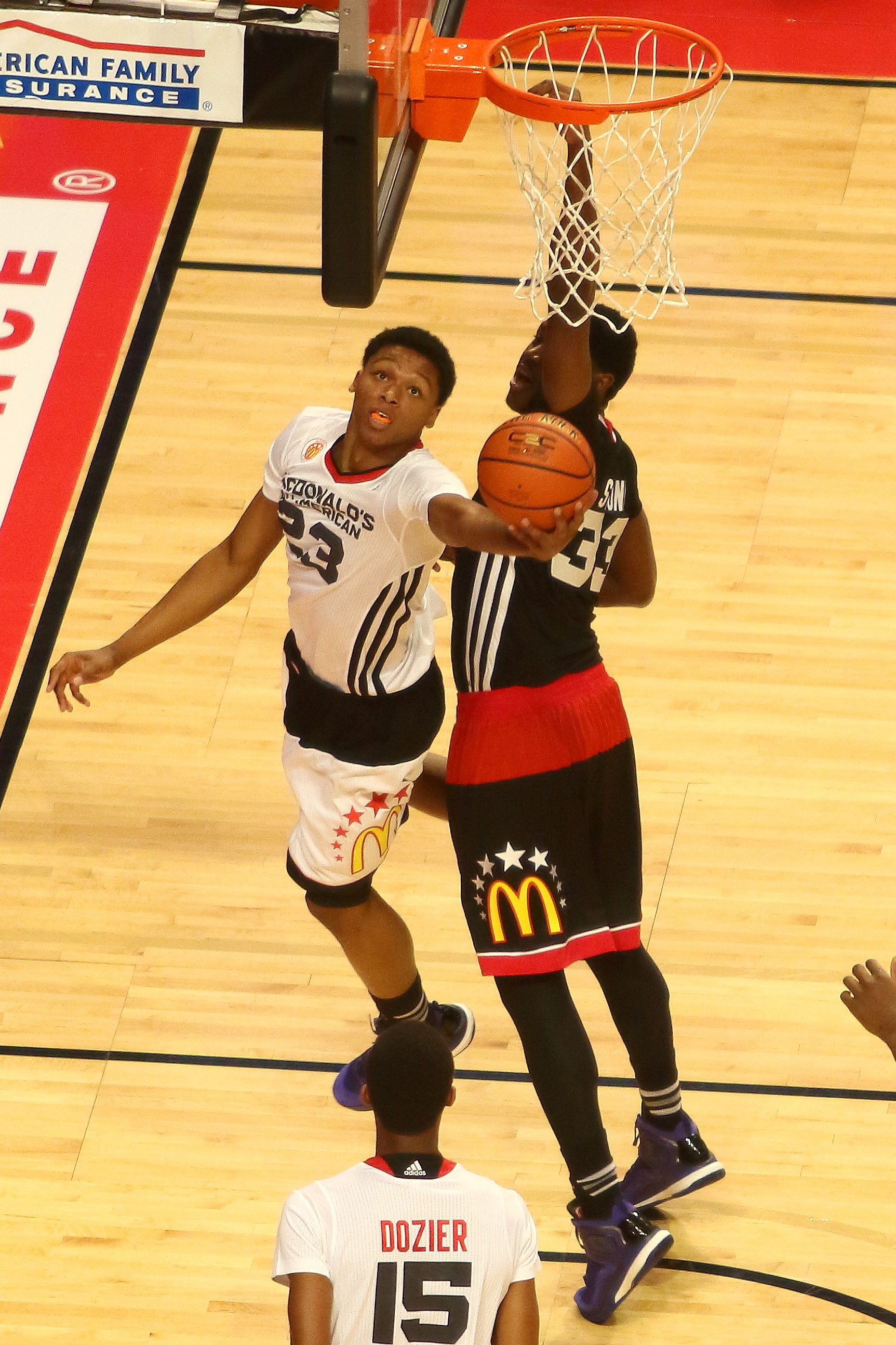
- Rabb at the 2015 McDonald's All American Game

Personal information
- Born: February 4, 1997 (age 29) Sacramento, California, U.S.
- Listed height: 6 ft 10 in (2.08 m)
- Listed weight: 220 lb (100 kg)

Career information
- High school: Bishop O'Dowd (Oakland, California)
- College: California (2015–2017)
- NBA draft: 2017: 2nd round, 35th overall pick
- Drafted by: Orlando Magic
- Playing career: 2017–2021
- Position: Power forward / center
- Number: 10

Career history
- 2017–2019: Memphis Grizzlies
- 2017–2019: →Memphis Hustle
- 2019–2020: Westchester Knicks
- 2021: Delaware Blue Coats

Career highlights
- NBA G League Sportsmanship Award (2020); First-team All-Pac-12 (2017); Second-team All-Pac-12 (2016); McDonald's All-American (2015); First-team Parade All-American (2015); California Mr. Basketball (2015)
- Stats at NBA.com
- Stats at Basketball Reference
Medals
Men's basketball
Representing United States
FIBA World U17 Championship
Gold medal – first place	2014 Dubai	National team

Ivan Charles Rabb Jr. (born February 4, 1997) is an American former professional basketball player. He played college basketball for the California Golden Bears. Growing up in California, he was named the top high school player in the state as a senior in 2015. He also received national recognition as an All-American. As a freshman with the Golden Bears, Rabb earned second-team all-conference honors in the Pac-12. He was named first-team All-Pac-12 as a sophomore before being selected in the second round of the 2017 NBA draft. He began his professional career playing two seasons with the Memphis Grizzlies.

== High school career ==
Rabb attended Bishop O'Dowd High School, where he won two CIF Northern California Open Division basketball championships and one CIF Open Division State Championship. Rabb competed in the summer for the AAU's Oakland Soldiers.

In four varsity seasons, Rabb amassed over 2,000 points, 1,000 rebounds, and is the winningest player (108–19) in school history. Recorded single-game career-highs of 42 points, 26 rebounds, eight assists and 13 blocked shots.

In his freshman year, he aided the Dragons to a 24–7 record and the 2012 CIF NCS championship game and he averaged 7.0 points, 7.0 rebounds, and 3.0 blocks as a freshman in 2011–12. He participated in the October 2012 USA Developmental National Team mini-camp, held in Colorado Springs, Colo.

He scored 25 points and hauled in 10 rebounds in the 2013 California Interscholastic Federation (CIF) North Coast Section (NCS) Division III championship game in leading the Dragons to the title, which marked the team's second-straight CIF NCS Division III title, also went undefeated in the WACC for the regular season league crown. He averaged 25.0 points, 13.0 rebounds, and 8.0 blocks as a sophomore in 2012–13. He was named to the 2013-14 USA Basketball Men's Developmental National Team on March 27, 2013.

As a senior, Rabb averaged 24.5 points, 16.3 rebounds, and 4.5 blocks. He led the Dragons to the CIF open division state title. In the championship game, held at Cal's stadium, Rabb scored 19 points, grabbed 21 rebounds, blocked 2 shots, and scored the go ahead free throw with 0.8 seconds left to give his team the win.

College recruiting
Name	Hometown	School	Height	Weight	Commit date
Ivan Rabb; PF	Oakland, California	Bishop O'Dowd High School	6 ft 11 in (2.11 m)	210 lb (95 kg)	Apr 13, 2015
Ivan Rabb; PF	Recruit ratings: Scout: Rivals: 247Sports: ESPN:				
Overall recruit ranking: Scout: 5 Rivals: 7 ESPN: 8
Note: In many cases, Scout, Rivals, 247Sports, On3, and ESPN may conflict in their listings of height and weight.; In these cases, the average was taken. ESPN grades are on a 100-point scale.; Sources:

== College career ==
Prior to his final decision on where to play collegiate basketball, Rabb had as many as ten schools as finalists. He ultimately announced his intent to enroll at the University of California, Berkeley, and play for the Golden Bears.

After a strong freshman season where he earned second-team All-Pac-12 honors, Rabb surprised many by opting to forego the 2016 NBA draft (despite him being projected to be a lottery selection that year) and return to Cal. Prior to the 2016–17 season, he was named a preseason All-American by the Associated Press.

At the conclusion of his sophomore season on March 22, 2017, Rabb announced his intention to forgo his final two years of collegiate eligibility and enter the 2017 NBA draft.

== Professional career ==
Rabb was selected 35th overall (5th pick of the second round) in the 2017 NBA draft by the Orlando Magic who later traded his rights to the Memphis Grizzlies. On September 18, 2017, Rabb agreed to a three-year rookie-scale deal with the Grizzlies, having his first two seasons fully guaranteed by Memphis. During his career, he has had multiple assignments with the Memphis Hustle, Grizzlies' G-League affiliate. On October 19, 2019, he was waived by the Grizzlies.

On October 23, 2019, Rabb signed a two-way contract with the New York Knicks. On January 13, 2020, the New York Knicks announced via their Twitter account that they had waived Rabb. He did not appear in a game for the parent club. On January 23, Rabb was reported to be added to the Westchester Knicks' roster.

For the 2020–21 season, Rabb joined the Delaware Blue Coats of the NBA G League, making his debut on February 11, 2021.

== National team career ==
He was the member of the USA Basketball Men's U16 National Team that posted a perfect 5–0 record en route to winning gold at the 2013 FIBA Americas U16 Championship in Maldonado, Uruguay; started three games and averaged 12.0 points and 9.8 rebounds.

== Career statistics ==
Legend
GP	Games played	GS	Games started	MPG	Minutes per game
FG%	Field goal percentage	3P%	3-point field goal percentage	FT%	Free throw percentage
RPG	Rebounds per game	APG	Assists per game	SPG	Steals per game
BPG	Blocks per game	PPG	Points per game	**Bold**	Career high

=== NBA ===
==== Regular season ====
Year	Team	GP	GS	MPG	FG%	3P%	FT%	RPG	APG	SPG	BPG	PPG
2017–18	Memphis	36	5	14.3	**.566**	–	**.806**	**4.4**	.9	**.3**	**.4**	5.6
2018–19	Memphis	**49**	**13**	**14.7**	.547	**.200**	.710	4.2	**1.1**	**.3**	.3	**5.8**
Career		85	18	14.6	.555	.200	.743	4.3	1.0	.3	.3	5.7

=== College ===
Year	Team	GP	GS	MPG	FG%	3P%	FT%	RPG	APG	SPG	BPG	PPG
2015–16	California	**34**	**34**	28.7	**.615**	**.500**	**.669**	8.5	.9	.5	**1.2**	12.5
2016–17	California	31	30	**32.6**	.484	.400	.663	**10.5**	**1.5**	**.7**	1.0	**14.0**
Career		65	64	30.6	.544	.409	.666	9.4	1.2	.6	1.1	13.2

== Awards and honors ==
College

- Second-team All-Pac-12 (2016)

High school

- 2015 CIF Open Division State Championship
- 2014, 2015 CIF Northern California Open Division Championship
- McDonald's All-American (2015)
- First-team Parade All-American (2015)
- 2013 MaxPreps Sophomore All-American first team.
- 2013 Cal-Hi Sports Sophomore of the Year.
- 2013 West Alameda County Conference (WACC) MVP/All-WACC.
- 2013 Contra Costa Times All-East Bay first team
- 2012 Torrey Pines/Jerry Tarkanian All-Tournament Team.

== Personal life ==
Rabb is the son of Ivan Sr. and Tami Rabb. He has a younger brother, Tamarik, who also attended Bishop O'Dowd High School. Rabb started playing basketball when he was 6 or 7 years old. In high school, he carried a 3.15 GPA. He attended the University of California, Berkeley and was ranked on ESPN's 2015 top 100 recruits as No. 8. Rabb is cousin of Reggie Rogers, University of Washington standout and NFL player.
