= Witch Club Satan =

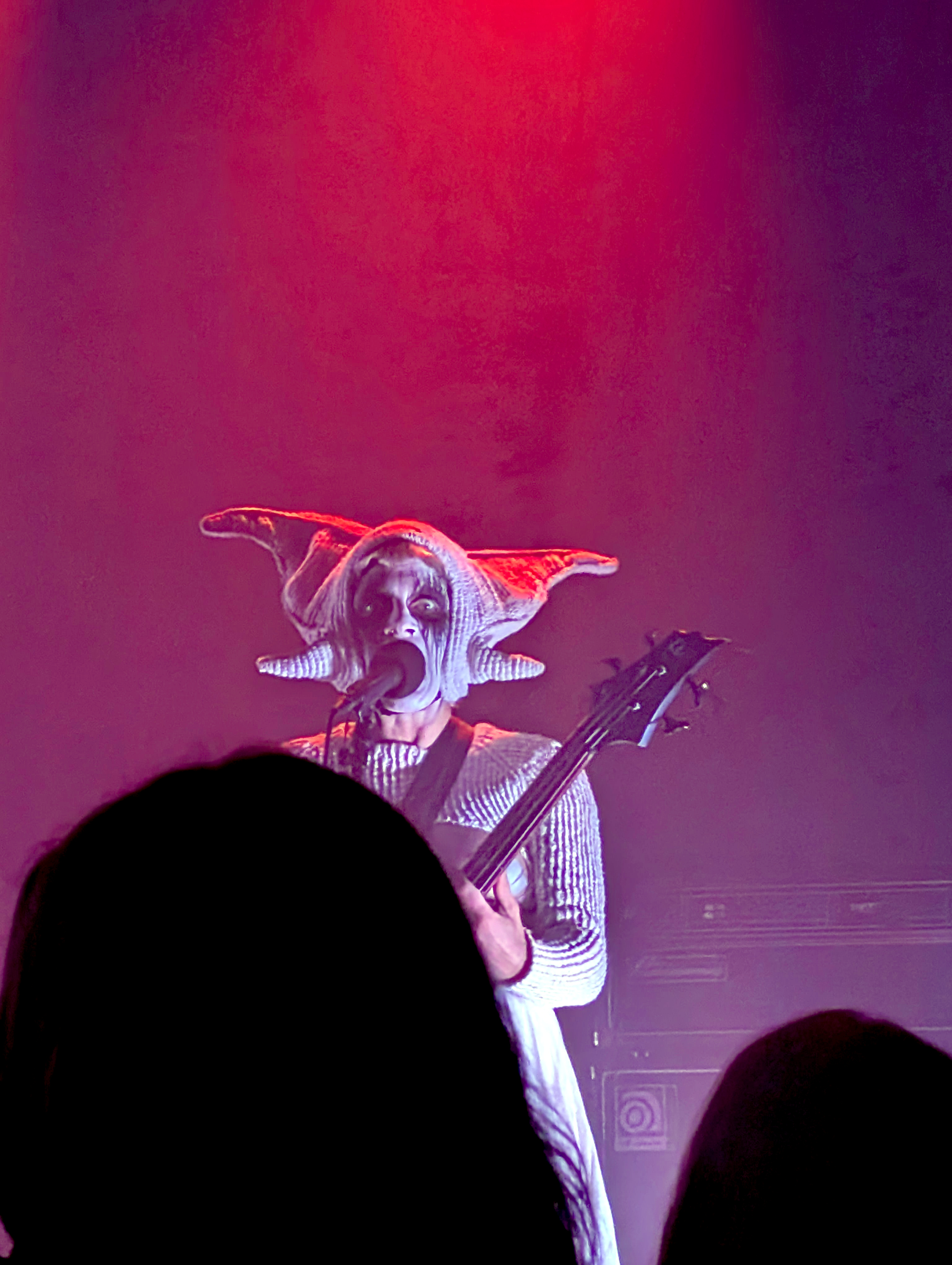

Background information
- Origin: Norway
- Genre: Black metal
- Years active: 2022–present
- Labels: Lost and Found Productions
- Website: www.witchclubsatan.com

Witch Club Satan is an all-female Norwegian black metal band.

== History ==
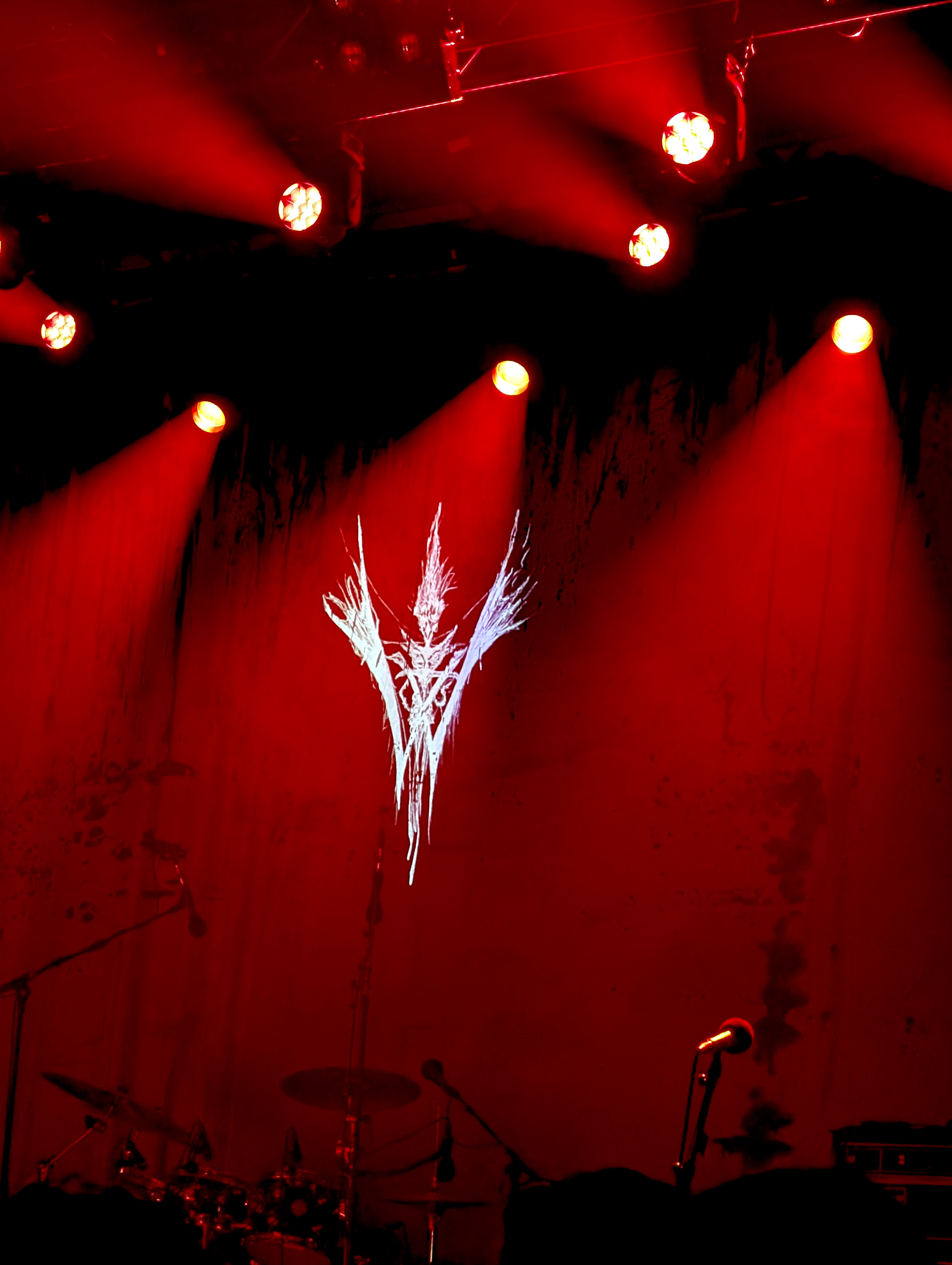
Witch Club Satan's logo

The group was formed in early 2022 after the three founding members met at theatre school. The band released their self-titled debut album on March 8, 2024. On June 23, 2025, the group released the single "You Wildflower." Johanna Holt Kleive left the band in 2026. The band is profiled in the 2026 documentary Hex.

== Musical style ==
Witch Club Satan has been compared to a number of other Norwegian black metal acts, including Mayhem, Darkthrone, Emperor, and Satyricon.

== Themes and imagery ==
The band has described themselves as "feminist." Their music also tackles other sociopolitical topics such as racism, environmentalism, and the Israeli-Palestinian conflict. Witch Club Satan's live shows and music videos often incorporate nudity, gore, and occult symbols. When starting out, the band reached out the Mayhem's Necrobutcher to gain an understanding of the genre and to see how they can fit their ideals into it.

== Members ==
- Nikoline Spjelkavik – guitar, vocals
- Victoria Røising – bass, vocals

=== Former members ===
- Johanna Holt Kleive – drums, vocals (2022–2026)

=== Live musicians ===
- Hedda Lægreid – bass, vocals (2025)

== Awards and nominations ==
=== Spellemannprisen ===
The music video for the group's single, Fresh Blood Fresh Pussy, was a nominee for the 2024 Spellemannprisen Music Video of the Year award.

=== Berlin Music Video Awards ===
In 2025, the group won 'Best Bizarre' music video at the Berlin Music Video Awards for their single Fresh Blood Fresh Pussy.

== Discography ==
=== Studio albums ===
| Title | Album details |
|---|---|
| Witch Club Satan | Released: March 8, 2024; Label: Lost And Found Productions |

=== Non-album singles ===
| Year | Song |
|---|---|
| 2022 | "Hysteria" |
| 2022 | "Solace Sisters" |
| 2023 | "Blod" |
