= Knechtsteden Abbey =

Abbey in Dormagen, Germany

Coordinates: 51°04′37″N 6°45′09″E

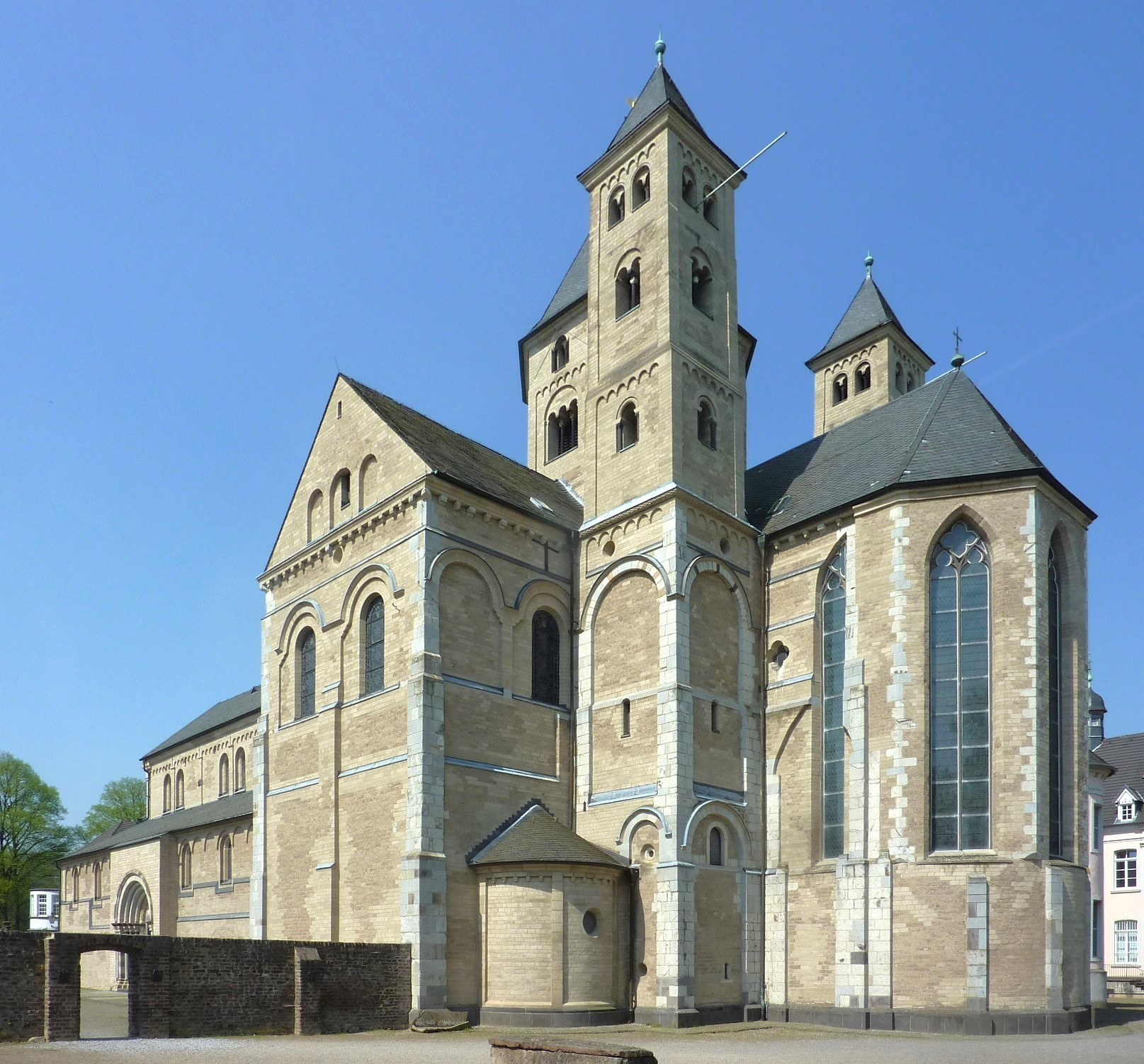
Knechtsteden Abbey.

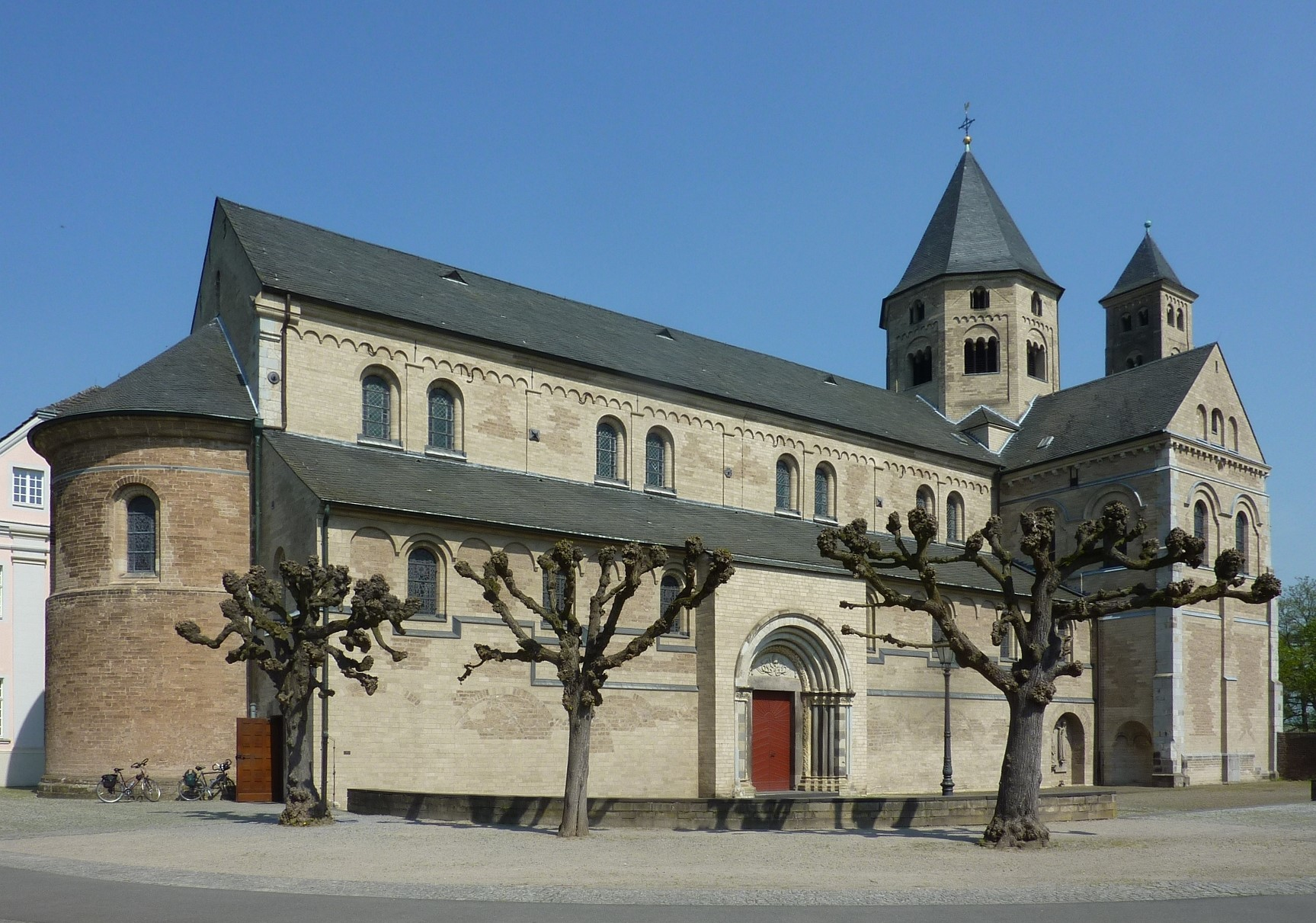
Knechtsteden Abbey.

Knechtsteden Abbey (German: Kloster Knechtsteden) is a former Premonstratensian abbey in Dormagen in North Rhine-Westphalia, Germany, since the 1890s a house of the Spiritans. It was founded in 1130, and in 1138 building began on the church, which was created a basilica minor in 1974.
