= Romina Plonsker =

German politician (born 1988)

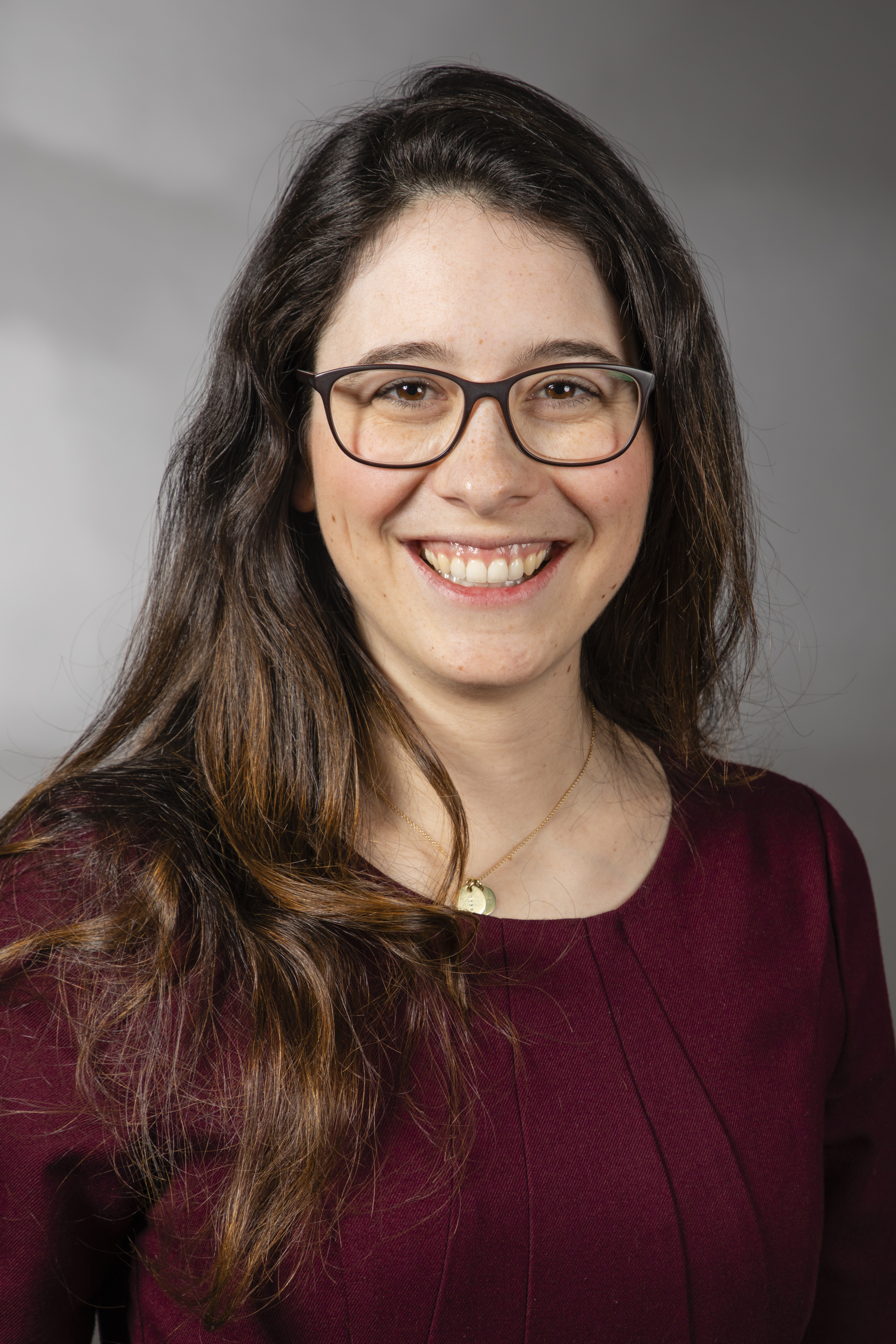
- Plonsker in 2019

Member of the Landtag of North Rhine-Westphalia
- Incumbent
- Assumed office 1 June 2017

Personal details
- Born: 26 July 1988 (age 37) Dormagen
- Party: Christian Democratic Union (since 2006)

Romina Plonsker (born 26 July 1988 in Dormagen) is a German politician serving as a member of the Landtag of North Rhine-Westphalia since 2017. She has served as chairwoman of the Christian Democratic Union in the Rhein-Erft-Kreis since 2021.
