= Terique Owens =

American gridiron football player (born 1999)

No. 84 – Montreal Alouettes
- Position: Wide receiver
- Roster status: Active
- CFL status: American

Personal information
- Born: September 25, 1999 (age 27); Fremont, California, U.S.
- Listed height: 6 ft 3 in (1.91 m)
- Listed weight: 193 lb (88 kg)

Career information
- High school: Bishop O'Dowd (Oakland, California)
- College: Contra Costa (2018); Florida Atlantic (2019–2020); Missouri State (2021–2023)
- NFL draft: 2024: undrafted

Career history
- San Francisco 49ers (2024–2025)*; Montreal Alouettes (2026–present)
- * Offseason or practice squad member only
- Stats at Pro Football Reference

Terique Owens (born September 25, 1999) is an American professional football wide receiver for the Montreal Alouettes of the Canadian Football League (CFL). He played college football at Contra Costa College, Florida Atlantic and Missouri State and signed as a undrafted free agent with the San Francisco 49ers in 2024.

== Early life ==
Owens was born on September 25, 1999 in Fremont, California. He grew up in Pleasanton and graduated from Bishop O'Dowd in Oakland in 2018, where he played basketball and football.

== College career ==
=== Contra Costa ===
Owens spent his freshman year at Contra Costa, playing in seven games and catching 15 receptions for 306 yards with two touchdowns.

=== Florida Atlantic ===
Owens transferred to Florida Atlantic in 2019, redshirting his first year. He made his debut in 2020, playing in four games, but recording no receptions.

=== Missouri State ===
Owens transferred to Missouri State in 2021. He played in seven games in 2021 as a redshirt junior, catching five receptions for 66 yards. He played in 10 games in 2022 as a redshirt senior, recording 13 receptions for 171 yards. He saw a bigger role in 2023, using the extra year of eligibility granted to NCAA athletes that competed in the COVID-affected 2020 season. He played in 10 games, recording 28 catches for 528 yards, with four touchdowns.

== Professional career ==
Pre-draft measurables
Height	Weight	Arm length	Hand span	40-yard dash	10-yard split	20-yard split	20-yard shuttle	Three-cone drill	Vertical jump	Broad jump
6 ft 2 in (1.88 m)	199 lb (90 kg)	31 7/8 in (0.81 m)	9 5/8 in (0.24 m)	4.54 s	1.57 s	2.58 s	4.74 s	7.47 s	38.5 in (0.98 m)	10 ft 4 in (3.15 m)
All values from Pro Day

=== San Francisco 49ers ===
On April 27, 2024, Owens signed with the San Francisco 49ers as an undrafted free agent after he was not selected in the 2024 NFL draft. He was waived/injured on August 7 and reverted to injured reserve the next day. He was waived on August 15. On October 2, Owens was signed to the 49ers' practice squad.

Owens signed a futures contract with the 49ers on January 6, 2025. He caught his first professional touchdown in a preseason game against the Chargers in week 3 of the 2025 preseason. He was waived on August 26, 2025.

=== Montreal Alouettes ===
On January 19, 2026, Owens signed with the Montreal Alouettes of the Canadian Football League (CFL). He was released on May 31 as part of final roster cuts. Owens was re-signed by the Alouettes on June 8, 2026.

== Personal life ==
Owens is the son of former NFL wide receiver Terrell Owens.
