= Alexi Pappas =

Greek-American runner and filmmaker

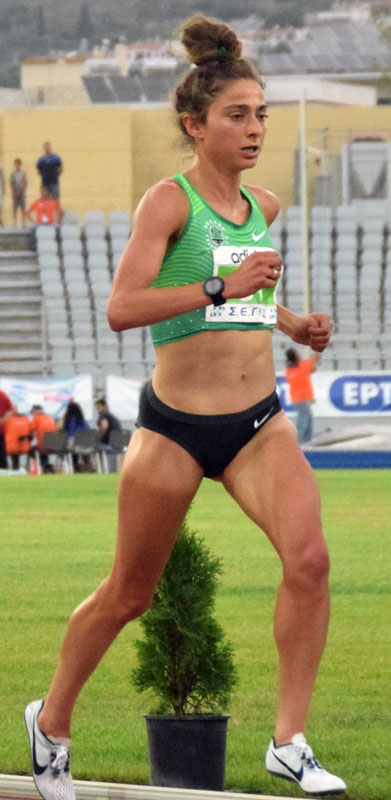

Personal information
- Nationality: American and Greek
- Born: March 28, 1990 (age 36) Berkeley, California, U.S.
- Home town: Alameda, California, U.S.
- Height: 5 ft 5 in (165 cm)

Sport
- Country: Greece
- Sport: Track and field
- Events: 10,000 metres 5,000 metres
- College team: Dartmouth College (2008-2012); Oregon Ducks (2012-13)

Achievements and titles
- Olympic finals: 2016; 10,000 m, 17th
- Personal bests: 1500 m: 4:14.08 (Burnaby 2013); 5000 m: 15:28.38 (Sacramento 2014); 10,000 m: 31:36.16 NR (Rio de Janeiro 2016); 3000 m steeple: 9:46.73 (Palo Alto 2013); Marathon: 2:34:26 (Houston 2020)

Alexi Pappas or Alexia Pappa (Greek Αλεξία Παππά; born March 28, 1990) is a Greek-American runner, filmmaker, actor, and writer. Pappas was an NCAA All-American athlete at both Dartmouth College and the University of Oregon. She represented Greece at the 2016 Summer Olympics, setting the national record for 10k.

== Early life and education ==
Pappas was born on March 28, 1990, to a Greek-American father who has roots from Rhodes and an American mother. She has a brother who is four years older. Pappas grew up in Alameda, California. Her mother died by suicide when Pappas was four years old.

== Athletic career ==
=== Bishop O'Dowd High School California Interscholastic Federation ===
As a sophomore at Oakland's Bishop O'Dowd High School, Pappas placed fourth in the Division III girls 5K race at the California Interscholastic Federation State Cross Country Championships in 2005.

Pappas's high school coach refused to let her participate in multiple sports, even though boys at the same high school were permitted to do so, and stated that this affected her physical development.

=== NCAA ===
Pappas was a two-time NCAA all-American at Dartmouth College. She was one of nine finalists for the 2012 NCAA Woman of the Year award. She also won the 2012 season's Ivy League title in the steeplechase (9:58.80) and qualified for the 2012 U.S. Olympic Trials in Eugene. Pappas graduated magna cum laude in creative writing and English from Dartmouth College in 2012.

Pappas attended the University of Oregon as a master's student, where she earned three NCAA Division I All-American awards. She finished eighth individually at the 2012 NCAA Cross Country Championships with a time of 19:43.9 (6,000 meters) helping the Oregon Ducks women's cross country team win the national title. She graduated from Oregon with a Master of Fine Arts in creative writing in 2013.

=== 2016 Olympics ===
Pappas became a Greek citizen on January 8, 2016, and on May 1 that year she broke the 10,000 m Greek national record, which had stood since 2002. She represented Greece at the 2016 Summer Olympics. At the Olympic finals, she improved her national record when she finished 17th in 31:36.16.

=== 2022 Boston Marathon ===
Pappas served as a guide for para-athlete Lisa Thompson in the 2022 Boston Marathon, who won the T13 (Visual Impairment) Division with a time of 3:47:25.

=== Honors ===
Year	Competition	Venue	Position	Event	Notes
Representing Greece
2016	European Championships	Amsterdam, Netherlands	11th	10,000 m	32:27.80
2016	European Championships	Amsterdam, Netherlands	11th	5,000 m	15:56.75
2016	Olympic Games	Rio de Janeiro, Brazil	17th	10,000 m	31:36.16 NR

== Filmmaking ==
Pappas has made several movies as a director, writer, actor, and producer. These include Tall as the Baobab Tree (2012), Speed Goggles (2016), Tracktown (2017), and Olympic Dreams (2019), which was the first fictional movie filmed in an Olympic village.

== Author ==
Pappas's first book, Bravey: Chasing Dreams, Befriending Pain, and Other Big Ideas, with a foreword by Maya Rudolph, was published on January 12, 2021.

== Personal life ==
Pappas married filmmaker Jeremy Teicher in June 2018. They were divorced in September 2023. In 2020 Pappas published a video about her struggle with depression, calling for better care of elite athletes' mental health.
