= Dormagen =

- Town
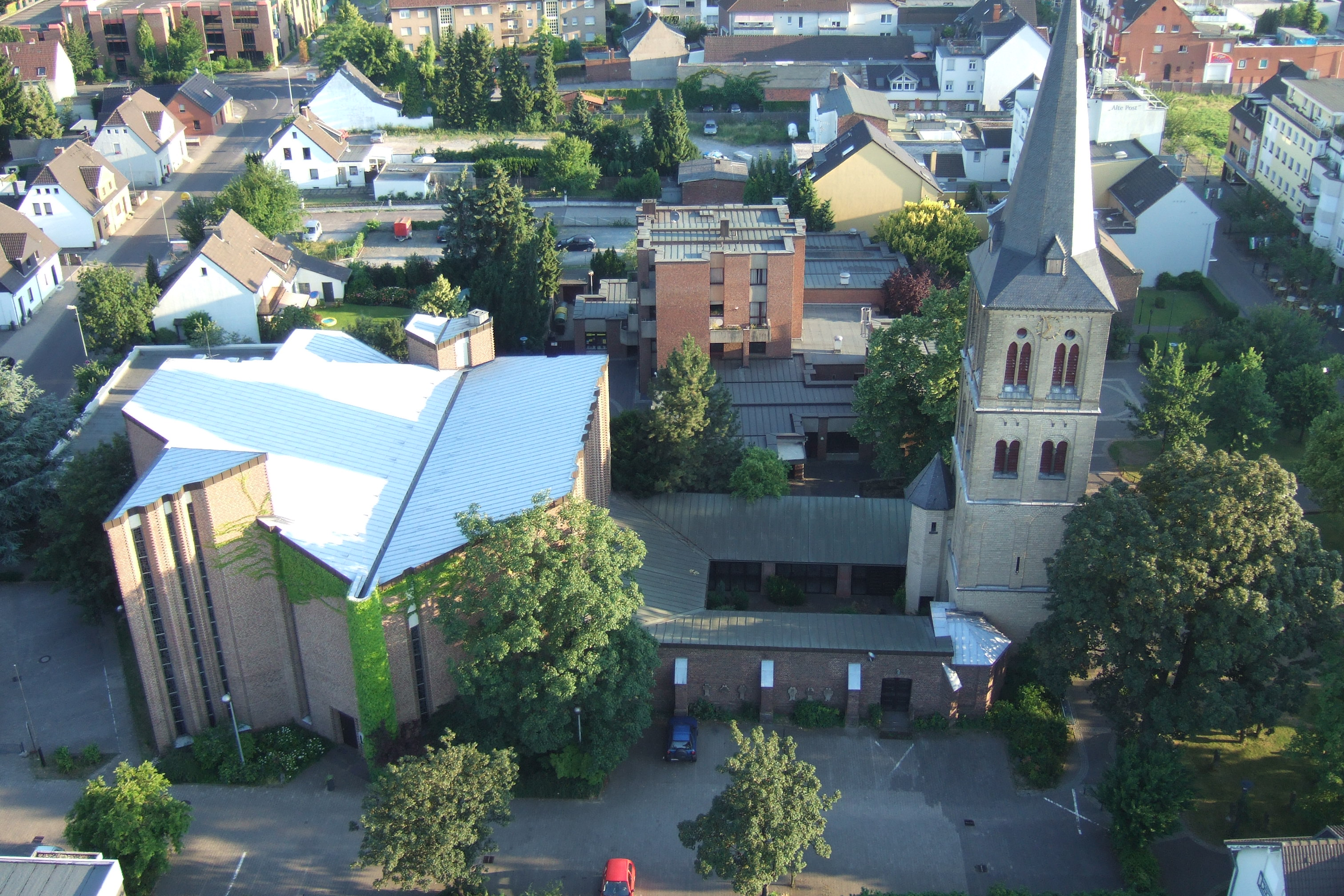
- Saint Michael Church

- Coat of arms

- Location of Dormagen within Rhein-Kreis Neuss district
- Interactive map of Dormagen
- Location within Germany Location within North Rhine-Westphalia
- Coordinates: 51°06′N 6°49′E
- Country: Germany
- State: North Rhine-Westphalia
- Admin. region: Düsseldorf
- District: Rhein-Kreis Neuss
- Subdivisions: 16

Government
  - Mayor (2014–30): Erik Lierenfeld (SPD)

Area
  - Total: 85.5 km^{2} (33.0 sq mi)
- Elevation: 45 m (148 ft)

Population (2025-12-31)
  - Total: 63,619
  - Density: 744/km^{2} (1,930/sq mi)
- Time zone: UTC+01:00 (CET)
  - Summer (DST): UTC+02:00 (CEST)
- Postal codes: 41539–41542
- Dialling codes: 02133, 02182
- Vehicle registration: NE & GV
- Website: dormagen.de

Dormagen (German pronunciation: [ˈdɔʁmaːɡn̩]; Ripuarian: Dormaje) is a town in North Rhine-Westphalia, Germany in the Rhein-Kreis Neuss.

== Geography ==
Dormagen is situated between Düsseldorf – Cologne – Mönchengladbach on the western bank of the river Rhine.

=== Division of the town ===
Dormagen consists of 16 subdivisions (with population figure):

- Broich: see Gohr
- Delhoven: 3,690
- Delrath: 3,082
- Dormagen Mitte: 5,621
- Gohr: 2,217 (with Broich)
- Hackenbroich (with Hackhausen): 8,689
- Hackhausen see Hackenbroich
- Horrem: 6,022
- Knechtsteden:
- Nievenheim (with Ückerath): 9,553
- Dormagen Nord: 3,514
- Rheinfeld: 5,403 (with Piwipp)
- St. Peter: see Stürzelberg
- Straberg: 2,840
- Stürzelberg: 4,643 (with St. Peter)
- Zons: 5,414 (with Nachtigall)
- Piwipp: 37 (Wohnmobil Parkplatz)

== History ==
Dormagen was founded 50 AD. Its latin name was Durnomagus.

== Economy ==
Its main industry and employer is the chemical factory of Bayer AG and since its founding the Covestro AG.

== Transport ==
The town has three stations (Dormagen, Nievenheim and Dormagen Chempark) on the Lower Left Rhine Railway, linking Cologne and Krefeld.

The German motorway 57 connects Dormagen with the same cities.

== Population ==
Historical population

Year	Pop.	±% p.a.
1767	585	—
1835	2,660	+2.25%
1935	6,400	+0.88%
1939	5,552	−3.49%
1950	8,929	+4.41%
1965	37,693	+10.08%
1970	50,560	+6.05%
1975	54,446	+1.49%
1980	56,648	+0.80%

Year	Pop.	±% p.a.
1985	57,289	+0.23%
1990	58,260	+0.34%
1995	61,155	+0.97%
2000	62,957	+0.58%
2005	63,466	+0.16%
2010	62,961	−0.16%
2015	64,064	+0.35%
2020	64,500	+0.14%
2025	63,619	−0.27%

Source: Landesdatabank Nordrhein-Westfalen (1965-2025)

== Twin towns – sister cities ==
Dormagen is twinned with:

- Kiryat Ono, Israel
- Saint-André-lez-Lille, France
- Toro, Spain
- Chipata, Zambia

== Notable people ==
- Lothar Hensel (born 1961), bandoneon player
- Andreas Lambertz (born 1984), footballer
- Jennifer Montag (born 1998), sprinter
- Romina Plonsker (born 1988), politician (CDU)
- Tim Rubink (born 1988), footballer
- Tim Scheerbarth (born 1989), racing driver
- Markus Solbach (born 1991), baseball player
- Sarah Voss (born 1999), artistic gymnast
- Paul Wischeidt (1944–2026), fencer
