= James Thomas O'Dowd =

American Catholic bishop

His Excellency, The Most Reverend James T. O'Dowd
- Auxiliary Bishop of San Francisco
- Church: Catholic Church
- See: Titular See of Cea
- Appointed: May 22, 1948
- In office: June 29, 1948 - February 4, 1950

Orders
- Ordination: June 4, 1932 by John Joseph Mitty
- Consecration: June 29, 1948 by John Joseph Mitty

Personal details
- Born: August 4, 1907 San Francisco, California, US
- Died: February 4, 1950 (aged 42) San Francisco

James Thomas O'Dowd (August 4, 1907 – February 4, 1950) was an American prelate of the Catholic Church in the United States. He served as an auxiliary bishop of the Archdiocese of San Francisco in California from 1948 to 1950.

== Biography ==
=== Early life ===
James O'Dowd was born on August 4, 1907, in San Francisco, California. He was ordained a priest for the Archdiocese of San Francisco on June 4, 1932 by Archbishop John Joseph Mitty in San Francisco. He attended Catholic University of America in Washington, D.C., where he received a Doctor of Philosophy degree.

=== Auxiliary Bishop of San Francisco ===
On May 22, 1948, Pope Pius XII appointed O'Dowd as the titular bishop of Cea, Greece and auxiliary bishop of San Francisco. He was consecrated at the Cathedral of Saint Mary of the Assumption in San Francisco by Mitty on June 29, 1948. The principal co-consecrators were Bishop Thomas Arthur Connolly of Seattle and Auxiliary Bishop Hugh Aloysius Donohoe of San Francisco. While auxiliary bishop, he also served as pastor at the Mission Dolores in San Francisco.

=== Death and legacy ===
On February 3, 1950, O'Dowd was a passenger in an automobile driven by Reverend Henry Lande. After stopping on train tracks, their car was struck by a freight train and dragged 300 feet (91 m). Lande died at the scene; O'Dowd was transported to the Fairfield-Suisun Air Force Base hospital near Fairfield, California. After being transferred to St Mary's Hospital in San Francisco, O'Dowd died the following day of his injuries at age 42. He was interred at Holy Cross Catholic Cemetery in Colma, California.

Bishop O'Dowd High School in Oakland, California is named in his memory.
