= Tracktown =

- Theatrical release poster
- Directed by: Alexi Pappas; Jeremy Teicher
- Written by: Alexi Pappas; Jeremy Teicher
- Produced by: Alexi Pappas; Jeremy Teicher; Laura Wagner; Jay Smith
- Starring: Alexi Pappas; Chase Offerle; Rachel Dratch; Andy Buckley
- Cinematography: Chris Collins
- Edited by: Sofi Marshall
- Music by: Jay Wadley
- Production companies: Bay Bridge Productions; Bunkhouse Films; Good Wizard; Jay Smith Productions; Joint; Salem Street Entertainment; Wieden+Kennedy Entertainment
- Distributed by: Orion Pictures; Samuel Goldwyn Films
- Release dates: June 4, 2016 (Los Angeles Film Festival); May 12, 2017
- Running time: 88 minutes
- Country: United States
- Language: English

Tracktown is a 2016 American drama and coming of age sports film directed and written by Alexi Pappas and Jeremy Teicher and starring Pappas, Chase Offerle, Rachel Dratch and Andy Buckley. Filming took place in Eugene, Oregon. Tracktown premiered at the Los Angeles Film Festival in June 2016 and its worldwide release was on the 12 May 2017.

== Plot ==
Twenty-one-year-old Plumb Marigold (Pappas) is a famous but lonely distance runner and has lived her entire life surrounded by coaches, teammates and fans while training to be an Olympic distance runner. Though she excels in her sport, she's always felt like an outsider, as her schedule has kept a normal life at bay. Everything changes when Plumb is ordered to take a day off from running to recover for the finals of the Olympic trials. Her forced downtime, including a surprise connection with a boy who works at the bakery, sets her on a new path.

== Cast ==
- Alexi Pappas as Plumb Marigold
- Chase Offerle as Sawyer
- Rachel Dratch as Gail, Plumb's mother
- Andy Buckley as Burt, Plumb's father
- Rebecca Friday as Whitney
- Sasha Spencer as Coach
- Remy Teicher as Jenny
- Nick Symmonds as Nick
- Kristina Haddad as Sports Doctor
- Chris Berman as Sports Announcer
- Berenice Odriozola as Manicurist

== Production ==
The producers of Tracktown are Laura Wagner, Jay Smith, Alexi Pappas and Jeremy Teicher.

Production was facilitated by the Sundance Institute's Creative Producing Lab Program and the San Francisco Film Society.

Production was assisted by interns from the University of Oregon.

== Filming ==
Filming took place in Eugene, Oregon (known as TrackTown USA). including at Hayward Field.

== Release ==
Tracktown premiered at the Los Angeles Film Festival in June 2016, was screened at the RiverRun International Film Festival in April 2017, and had its worldwide release on the 12 May 2017.

It was also part of the Official Section for the 2016 Thessaloniki International Film Festival, the 2017 Annapolis Film Festival, the 2017 Sunscreen Film Festival, and the Green Mountain Film Festival.

=== Critical response ===
Tracktown was met with mixed to positive reviews. Variety's Peter Debruge wrote that "What the film lacks in originality, it makes up for via its star's naturally glamor-resistant sensibility, giving us an unpolished glimpse into the personal life of a professional runner." Andy Webster of The New York Times wrote that "Fact and fiction blend nicely in Tracktown, the modest, appealing feature debut of Alexi Pappas." It holds a 71% rating on Rotten Tomatoes.

== See also ==
- List of films about the sport of athletics
