= Salvatore Ganacci =

Bosnian-Swedish DJ and record producer

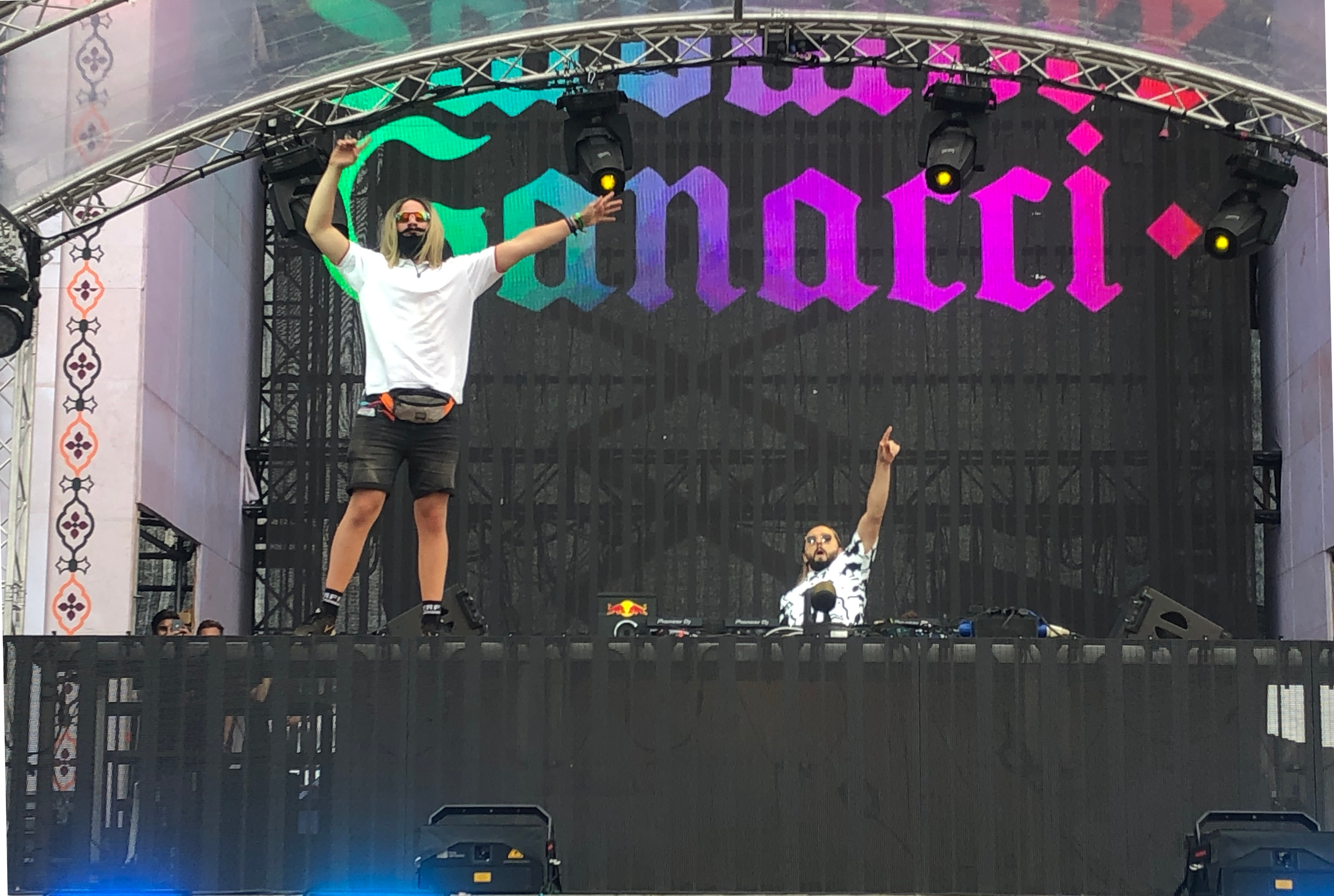
- Salvatore Ganacci (right) together with a lookalike at Airbeat One 2019

Background information
- Born: Emir Kobilić; 29 July 1986 (age 39); Sarajevo, SFR Yugoslavia, SR Bosnia and Herzegovina
- Genres: EDM; moombahton; trap; dancehall
- Occupations: Record producer; disc jockey
- Labels: OWSLA; Zatara; Refune; Universal Music Group; Mad Decent; Stmpd Rcrds; Spinnin' Records

Emir Kobilić (Bosnian pronunciation: [ěmir kôbilit͡ɕ]), known professionally as Salvatore Ganacci (Italian: [salvaˈtoːre ɡaˈnattʃi]), is a Bosnian-Swedish DJ and record producer. His performances at Tomorrowland in 2018 and 2019 became viral.

== Early life ==
Emir Kobilić was born in Sarajevo, SFR Yugoslavia, and moved to Stockholm, Sweden. He told an interviewer that his performing name derives from being nicknamed "Salvatore Ganacci" by his childhood friends while playing football, as his "style of play was very Italian".

== Career ==
Ganacci began studying at Musikmakarna in 2010, in Örnsköldsvik, Sweden. He went on to work as a producer. In 2013, Ganacci, together with Sanjin, released his first song, "Zlatan", inspired by Swedish footballer Zlatan Ibrahimović. In the song itself, he used another alias, called "Youthman". In the following year, Ganacci released "Fresh", his collaboration with Sanjin and Jillionaire of Major Lazer. In 2015, Ganacci signed a record deal with Sebastian Ingrosso's Refune Music label. He also released a track featuring vocals from Trinidad James entitled "Money In My Mattress". MTV News said the accompanying video "will be the weirdest thing you watch all day". In 2018, he released the track "Jook It" with Tujamo.

Ganacci's song "Horse" was released on audio and video in 2019 by Owsla, a label co-owned by Skrillex. It garnered recognition at the Berlin Music Video Awards and the Grammis. The music video for "Horse" was the overall winner of the Berlin Music Video Awards in 2020, also winning the award for the "Best Concept" category.

The video begins with a group of people in the forest torturing animals, before Ganacci is alerted by an eagle and arrives driving a shoe. He then subjects the torturers to the very punishments they were inflicting on the animals. Billboard commented "it's kind of funny, but mostly it's just bizarre". As of September 2024, the video on OWSLA's official YouTube channel had over 58 million views. Ganacci worked with director Vedran Rupić and said about the clip "My message is always about love, but I really love to experiment with what love can be". PopMatters listed "Horse" and also Party Favor's "Wasabi", which featured Ganacci, in its best dance tracks for 2019.

Ganacci's next release was the "Boycycle" EP, which also came with a video. The song had vocals from Sébastien Tellier and the video told the story of a being who is half man, half motorcycle. Ganacci collaborated again with Rupić to make the video for "Step-Grandma" in 2021. He later received Best Performance in a Video at the UK Music Video Awards.

In 2018, Ganacci performed at Tomorrowland Festival in Belgium and received attention for his dancing and comedic antics. Billboard, Mixmag and NME gave his performance positive reviews, and clips of it went viral on the internet. He returned to the main stage of Tomorrowland the following year, beginning his set by standing in the crowd booing his own performance. He also played at Electric Daisy Carnival at the Las Vegas Motor Speedway.

Ganacci occasionally posts comedic shorts on his YouTube channel; much like his music videos, these skits tend to explore the humor in absurdist and surreal situations they depict.

In 2025, Ganacci was announced as a playable character in the fighting game Fatal Fury: City of the Wolves.

== Awards and nominations ==
Year	Ceremony	Award	Nominated work	Result	Ref.
2020	Berlin Music Video Awards	Best Music Video	"Horse"	Won	
2020	Berlin Music Video Awards	Best Concept	"Horse"	Won	
2020	Berlin Music Video Awards	Best Narrative	''Boycycle''	Nominated	
2020	Grammis	Music Video of the Year	"Horse"	Won	
2021	UK Music Video Awards	Best Performance in a Video	"Step-Grandma"	Won	
2022	Berlin Music Video Awards	Best Animation	FIGHT DIRTY	Nominated	
2023	Berlin Music Video Awards	Best Narrative	Take Me To America	Nominated	
