= Lothar Hensel =

German bandoneon player and composer

Lothar Hensel (born 14 September 1961) is a German bandoneon player, composer and arrangeur.

== Life and career ==
Born in Dormagen, studied school Music at the Berlin University of the Arts, majoring in clarinet. During his studies, he began playing the bandoneon. In 1990, he went to Buenos Aires to perfect his playing with teachers Arturo Penón and Nestor Marconi. In Paris, he also had lessons with Juan José Mosalini, one of the most famous tango soloists of tango nuevo.

As a bandoneonist, Hensel has worked with renowned orchestras, such as the Berlin Philharmonic and the Deutsches Symphonie-Orchester Berlin, and renowned soloists, such as guitarist Quique Sinesi. His musical interest is particularly in the compositions of Astor Piazzolla, which he has recorded in original versions and also in his own arrangements on CD.

As a composer, he wrote operas, chamber and orchestral music. In it, he tries to combine mainly South American tango elements with classical European chamber music. As a commissioned work for the Mecklenburgisches Staatstheater Schwerin, Hensel wrote the chamber opera Ein letzter Tango für Margot H. in 2001.

In 2007, his opera Pamina lebt was premiered at the Mittelsächsisches Theater. He also wrote the libretto for this work. In the same year, his 2nd concerto for bandoneon and large orchestra was premiered with the Staatsphilharmonie Rheinland-Pfalz, which was broadcast live by Deutschlandradio.

Hensel performs chamber music and as a soloist with his quartet tango fusión, which consists of bandoneon, violin, cello and double bass. He also gives concerts with his tango orchestra Septísimo Tango. Since the 2000s, he has lived with his wife and daughter in Friedrichshagen. He was also a teacher for the school subject music and German at the Gebrüder-Montgolfier Gymnasium in the Treptow-Köpenick district of Berlin until the end of the 2019/20 school year.
