= Bishop O'Dowd High School =

Catholic school in Oakland, California

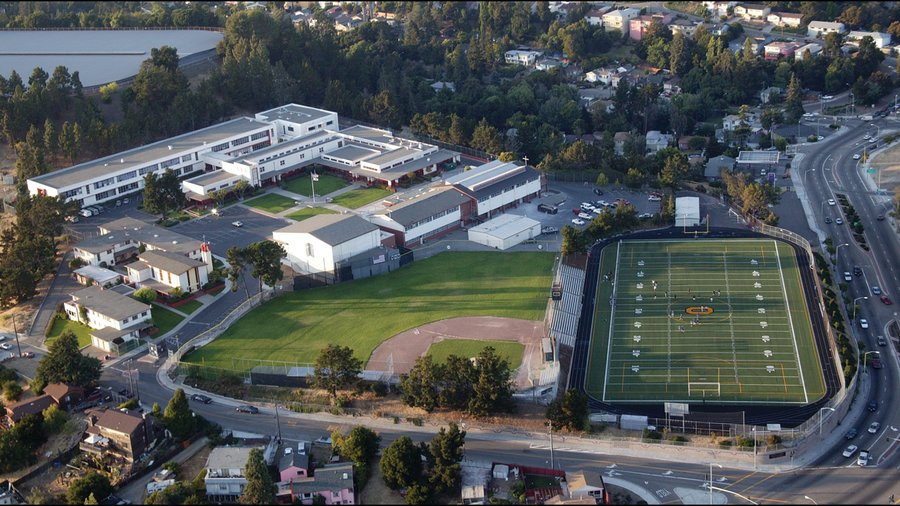
- Aerial view of Bishop O'Dowd High School in 2018.

Location
- 9500 Stearns Avenue; Toler Heights, Oakland, California; Oakland, Alameda County, California 94605; United States; 37°45′13″N 122°09′18″W

Information
- Type: Private, Coeducational
- Motto: "Finding God in all things"
- Religious affiliation: Roman Catholic
- Established: 1951
- Status: Open
- Superintendent: Andrew Currier
- President: Kim Walsh
- Principal: Doug Evans
- Faculty: 125
- Grades: 9–12
- Enrollment: 1,280 (2026–2027)
- Average class size: 26
- Student to teacher ratio: 14:1
- Campus: Urban
- Campus size: 20 acres
- Colors: Black and Gold
- Athletics conference: West Alameda County Conference, Foothill League
- Mascot: Dragon
- Team name: Dragons
- Rival: Berkeley High School and Piedmont High School
- Accreditation: Western Association of Schools and Colleges
- Test average: 1230 Average SAT, 28 Average ACT
- Newspaper: The Crozier
- Yearbook: Mitre
- Endowment: US$14 million (2026-2027)
- School fees: $1,100 registration deposit + $2,400 recommended parent pledge
- Tuition: $28,380 (2026–2027)
- Alumni: More than 17,000
- Website: bishopodowd.org

Bishop O'Dowd High School is a Catholic, co-educational, and college-preparatory school in Oakland, California, administered by the Roman Catholic Diocese of Oakland. Founded in 1951 and named after Auxiliary Bishop James Thomas O'Dowd, the school sits on a 20-acre (8.1 ha) campus in the Oakland Hills. As of the 2026–2027 academic year, the school enrolls approximately 1,280 students.

Extracurricular activities include band, environmental studies, and various sports. Recognized as a Blue Ribbon School and awarded a Green Ribbon Award, Bishop O'Dowd is notable for its environmental education initiatives, including a four-point-five-acre (1.8 ha) ecological restoration site known as the Living Lab, as well as its well-regarded athletic programs, having won numerous state championships.

Notable alumni include several athletes, such as National Football League (NFL) player Terique Owens, basketball player Ivan Rabb, and baseball players Ryan Drese and Jeff Kobernus, along with cartoonist Gene Luen Yang, who created a graphic novel, Dragon Hoops, set at Bishop O'Dowd.

== Namesake ==
Bishop O'Dowd High School is named after James Thomas O'Dowd (1907–1950), who served as Auxiliary Bishop of the Archdiocese of San Francisco from 1949 until his death. Born in San Francisco, O'Dowd was ordained a priest and later appointed Superintendent of Schools of the Archdiocese. He worked to expand Catholic education throughout the San Francisco Bay Area; during his tenure, he established Marin Catholic High School and Archbishop Riordan High School. O'Dowd died on February 6, 1950, after an automobile in which he was traveling was struck by a freight train near Suisun City, California. He had been appointed auxiliary bishop only the previous year. Originally planned as East Oakland Catholic High School, the school was named in his honor and opened in 1951.

== History ==
=== Founding and early years (1951–1955) ===
Bishop O'Dowd High School was established in 1951 by the Archdiocese of San Francisco to meet the need for Catholic education in the East Bay. Its campus was constructed on a 20-acre site that was formerly a rock quarry in the Oakland Hills. Classes were held at St. Louis Bertrand Elementary School with an initial enrollment of 120 freshmen.

The campus was opened in 1952 and was run by the first principal, Father Mark J. Hurley. The original faculty was composed of diocesan priests and the Dominican Sisters of Adrian, Michigan. Bishop O'Dowd graduated its first senior class in 1955.

=== Religious administration and growth (1955–2005) ===
Administration of the school was transferred to the Missionary Oblates of Mary Immaculate in 1966, a period in which Bishop O'Dowd became co-educational and established long-standing traditions, including Spirit Week in 1967. In 1978, the Congregation of St. Basil took on school leadership for the next 27 years. The motto, "Teach me goodness, discipline, and knowledge", is the foundation of the Basilian educational philosophy and served as the school's guiding mission between 1978 and 2005. The leadership was characterized by significant campus expansion, with the addition of an American football field, new science laboratories in 1991, and ten classrooms in 1993. Performing arts facilities were modernized in 2000 with the opening of the 325-seat James T. Bill '55 Theater.

In 2005, the school transitioned to a President/Principal model under a Board of Regents, with a shift towards environmental stewardship. The charism "Finding God in All Things" has served as the foundation of the school's educational philosophy and guiding mission since 2005, following the departure of the Basilian Fathers.

=== Modern development and sustainability (2000–present) ===
In the 21st century, Bishop O'Dowd was recognized for its environmental education curriculum. In 2000, the school dedicated 4.5 acres at the edge of its campus to the Living Lab, a student-led ecological restoration project. In June 2010, a three-year, $9 million comprehensive fundraising campaign was completed, funding renovations for upgraded classrooms, locker facilities, laboratories, ventilation systems, and technology infrastructure. In 2014, the $2.8 million Center for Environmental Studies was opened.

In 2022, the completion of the $40 million, 38,000-square-foot-long (3,500 m^{2}) Bishop John S. Cummins Center replaced the original locker rooms and courts with specialized athletic and music facilities. The facility includes a gymnasium, athletic training areas, and studios for music and theater. Since its founding, Bishop O'Dowd had graduated more than 17,000 alumni.

== Campus ==
Bishop O'Dowd High School sits on a 20-acre (8.1 ha) campus at the crest of the Oakland Hills, overlooking the San Francisco Bay. The site was originally a rock quarry with a hillside topography. The school is divided into several areas, characterized by its mix of mid-20th century architecture and modern, sustainable facilities. The campus is divided into an upper campus, housing the majority of academic wings and administrative offices, and a lower campus dedicated primarily to athletics and environmental studies. Major facilities include the Living Lab, the Center for Environmental Studies, the Cummins Center, and performing arts spaces.

== Student body ==
=== Demographics ===
Racial makeup of Bishop O'Dowd High School (2024)
1. White alone: 623 (49.3%)
2. Black alone: 258 (20.4%)
3. Asian alone: 226 (17.9%)
4. Hispanic, any race: 156 (12.4%)

As of the 2026–2027 school year, 1,280 students are enrolled at Bishop O'Dowd High School. The school employs 94 faculty members: 70% hold advanced degrees, and 50% identify as people of color. With a 14:1 student-to-teacher ratio and an average class size of 26, the school provides more than $3 million annually in financial aid to 30% of students. Between 13% and 15% of tuition is covered by philanthropy. Additionally, approximately 30 incoming 9th-grade students receive a Presidential Scholarship Award, a merit-based award recognizing high academic achievement on the High School Placement Test (HSPT) and a commitment to service. The school has seen a decline in White students from 77.1% in 2004 to 49.3% in 2024.

=== Admission ===
Every year, Bishop O'Dowd High School receives between 800 and 900 applications for a freshman class of 300 to 325 students, reflecting an acceptance rate of approximately 35–40%. The school often prioritizes applicants who come from Diocese of Oakland elementary schools.

Applicants are required to take the High School Placement Test (HSPT), a standardized exam for incoming Catholic high school students that evaluates mathematics, reading, and language proficiency. Additionally, the school offers optional placement exams to determine freshman course levels in English, mathematics, and world languages.

== Academics ==
=== Curriculum ===
The minimum graduation requirements for Bishop O'Dowd include four years of English, four years of religious studies, and three years each of social studies and mathematics. Students are also required to complete two to three years of science, two years of a world language, two years of physical education and health, and one year of visual and performing arts.

All students must also complete at least 100 hours of community service through a tiered program. In ninth grade, the Common Home Project requires ten hours of service focused on integral ecology and sustainability, which can include work in the school's Living Lab. Tenth-grade students complete the Friends Project, which involves 25 hours of mentoring for children aged four to twelve. During the eleventh and twelfth grades, students must complete the Anawim Project, which consists of 60 hours of service working with marginalized communities and charitable organizations.

As a Catholic institution, the school incorporates religious life into its program. The school's Campus Ministry organizes daily student-led prayer, weekly Mass, and monthly school-wide liturgies. The school requires participation in grade-level retreats, concluding in the voluntary Kairos retreat for juniors and seniors, which focuses on spiritual and personal reflection. As of 2026, the school offers 37 Advanced Placement (AP) and Honors classes across mathematics and computer science, science, English, social studies, arts, and world languages.

=== Awards and outcomes ===
Bishop O'Dowd was recognized as a Blue Ribbon School in 1990–1991. The California Department of Education also awarded the Green Ribbon Award in recognition of its environmental initiatives, including the Center for Environmental Studies.

Average standardized test scores are 1230 on the SAT and 28 on the ACT. The school reports a 98% graduation rate and a 93% rate of graduates attending four-year colleges. The school is also ranked among the top California private high schools for University of California admissions.

== Extracurricular activities ==
=== Athletics ===
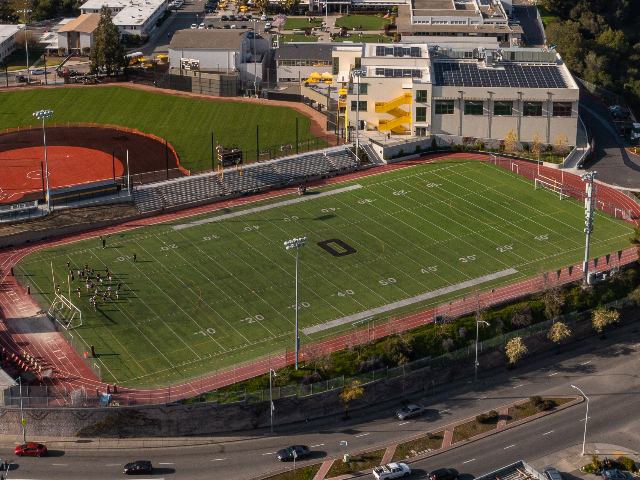
Bishop O'Dowd Athletic Fields in 2023

Bishop O'Dowd offers 48 teams across 16 varsity sports, including baseball, basketball, cheerleading, cross country, esports, American football, golf, lacrosse, rugby, soccer, softball, swimming and diving, tennis, track and field, volleyball, and water polo. The school competes in the West Alameda County Conference (WACC) and the California Interscholastic Federation (CIF) North Coast Section. The school has won 16 CIF State Championships. Across all sports, 60% of the student body participates in at least one sport.

==== Basketball ====
In 2015, the boys' varsity team won the CIF Open Division Championship, accompanied by future NBA player Ivan Rabb. That same year, the girls' basketball team won the Division III CIF State title, and the school's men's varsity basketball team was ranked 13th nationally.

==== American football ====
The school's American football program won the CIF State Division 5-AA championship in 2016. Following a rebuild, the team hired former NFL player and coach Hardy Nickerson, who led the team to another CIF Division 5-AA title in the 2025 season.

==== Association football ====
The girls' soccer program's standout 2025–2026 season finished with a 19–0 record, winning the CIF North Coast Section Open Division Championship. This was the first time an O'Dowd soccer team won an NCS title in the top open division. The team then won the NorCal Division I Championship in the 2025–2026 season, advancing to the first-ever CIF State Soccer Championship game.

=== Clubs ===
Bishop O'Dowd offers 96 clubs, nearly half of which are student-led. These clubs are often focused on cultural identity, academic competition, social justice, and niche student interests. 14 of the clubs are culturally focused. These include the Black Student Union, Latinos Unidos, Asian Student Union, Jewish Student Union, and Pasifika Club, as well as empowerment-focused groups like Sistahs of Success, Ubuntu, and The United Brothers of O'Dowd. The school maintains competitive Debate and Mock Trial teams, emphasizing public speaking, logic, and legal analysis.

=== Environmental studies ===
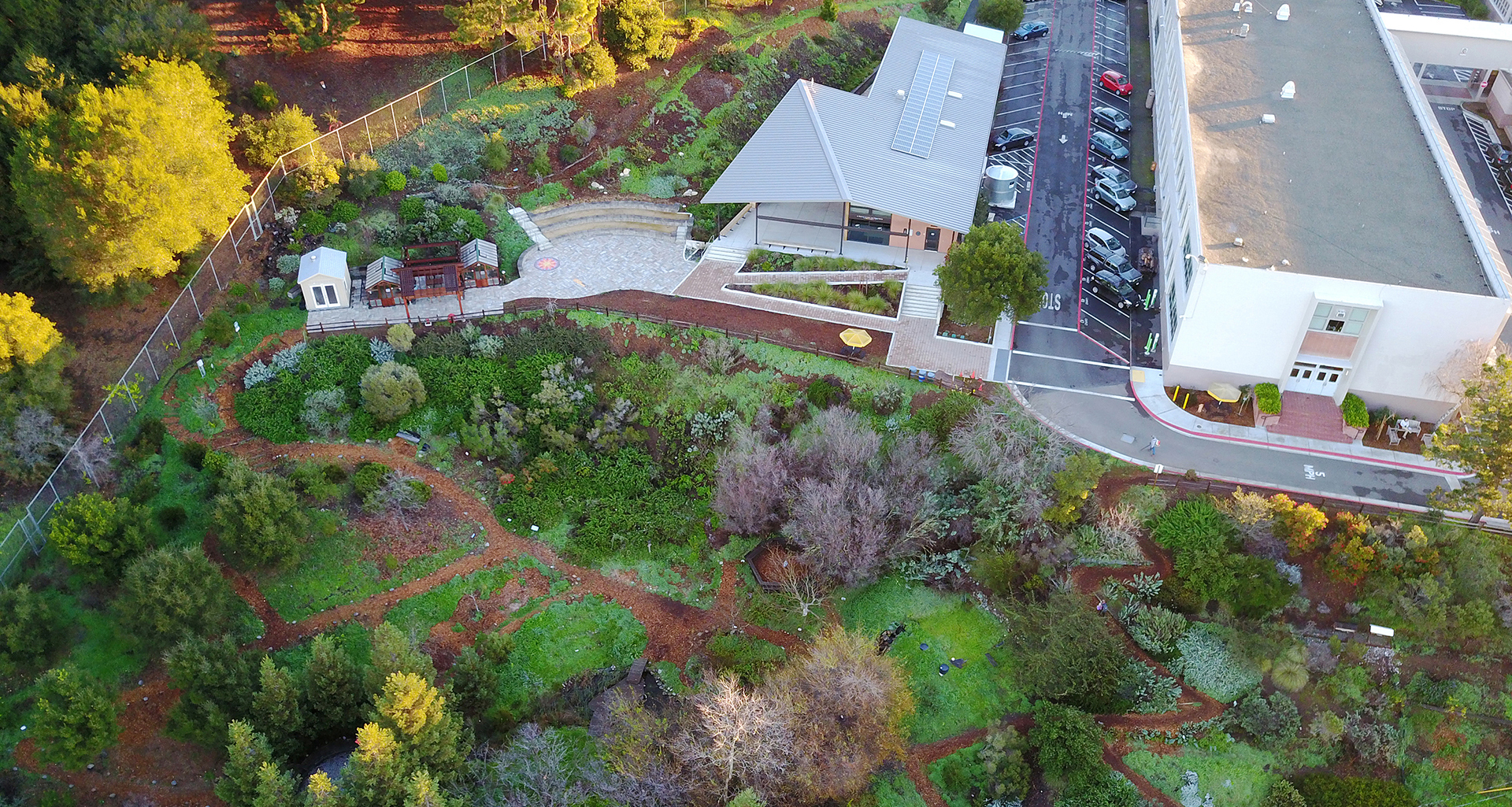
The Center for Environmental Studies and the Living Lab in 2017

Completed in 2014, the Center for Environmental Studies is a $2.8 million, 3,700-square-foot-long (340 m^{2}) building that houses Science and the Environment classes for ninth-grade students. The building is LEED Platinum certified and serves as the home of the school's environmental science and engineering program.

Established in 2000, the Living Lab is a 4.5 acres (2 ha) student-powered and maintained hillside restoration site, ecological study area, sustainable garden, and wildlife habitat at the edge of the campus. The lab includes four local ecosystems, beehives, chickens, rabbits, edible plantings, and water catchment systems, and it is used for field research, experiential learning, and spiritual reflection.

=== Traditions ===
Since 1967, Bishop O'Dowd has held an annual Spirit Week, an event designed to develop school community and student participation. The week traditionally begins with Unity Day, where students and faculty wear the school colors of black and gold, and features class-based competitions, rallies, and charitable events. The school also hosts annual Family Days during the fall semester, which are events dedicated to celebrating the cultural diversity of the student body and bringing families onto campus. In addition, grade-level retreats, campus ministry events, and service projects are central parts of student life.

== Controversies ==
=== Diocesan morality clause ===
A morality clause was added to teacher contracts by the Roman Catholic Diocese of Oakland in 2014. The clause required all employees to adopt the Catholic Church's teachings, including its positions on marriage, sexuality, and reproductive technology. The policy led to the departure of faculty members, including English teacher Kathleen Purcell, who was terminated after refusing to sign the agreement. The incident sparked protests and criticism from parents and alumni, who argued the clause conflicted with the school's mission of diversity and inclusion.

=== Sexual misconduct ===
In the summer of 2020, students created an anonymous Instagram account named @odowdprotectors, documenting over 100 reports of sexual harassment and assault at the school. In response, the administration updated its curriculum, launched a new digital reporting tool for students to report issues, and announced annual education for students and families on consent and healthy relationships. In 2021, former senior students Kayla Goodin and Olivia Bruhmuller organized walkouts at school to bring awareness of harassment and assault and to pressure the administration to act.

=== Political positions ===
In 2024, the school terminated the employment of English teacher Erin Donevan, who refused to remove a Free Palestine pin. Administration said that teachers had been advised to maintain neutrality on controversial geopolitical issues. Donevan argued that the pin was consistent with the school's social justice mission and noted that other political symbols, such as Black Lives Matter and LGBTQ pride pins, had been permitted. This led to student walkouts and a broader community debate regarding academic freedom and political expression in a private religious institution.

At the start of the 2026–27 school year, school president Kim Walsh announced it will replace previously displayed Pride and progress flags in classrooms with a newly created school emblem, the "Inclusive O," after the Diocese of Oakland asked the school to do so following a complaint to Oakland Archbishop Michael Barber about a Progress flag displayed on campus. The Inclusive O incorporates rainbow watercolor elements into the school's traditional "O" logo to represent support to LGBTQ students, families, faculty, and staff. The decision drew criticism; an alumni-run Instagram account criticized the change, stating that removing the flags directly impacts representation for the school's LGBTQ population and urging community members to email Walsh.

=== High costs ===
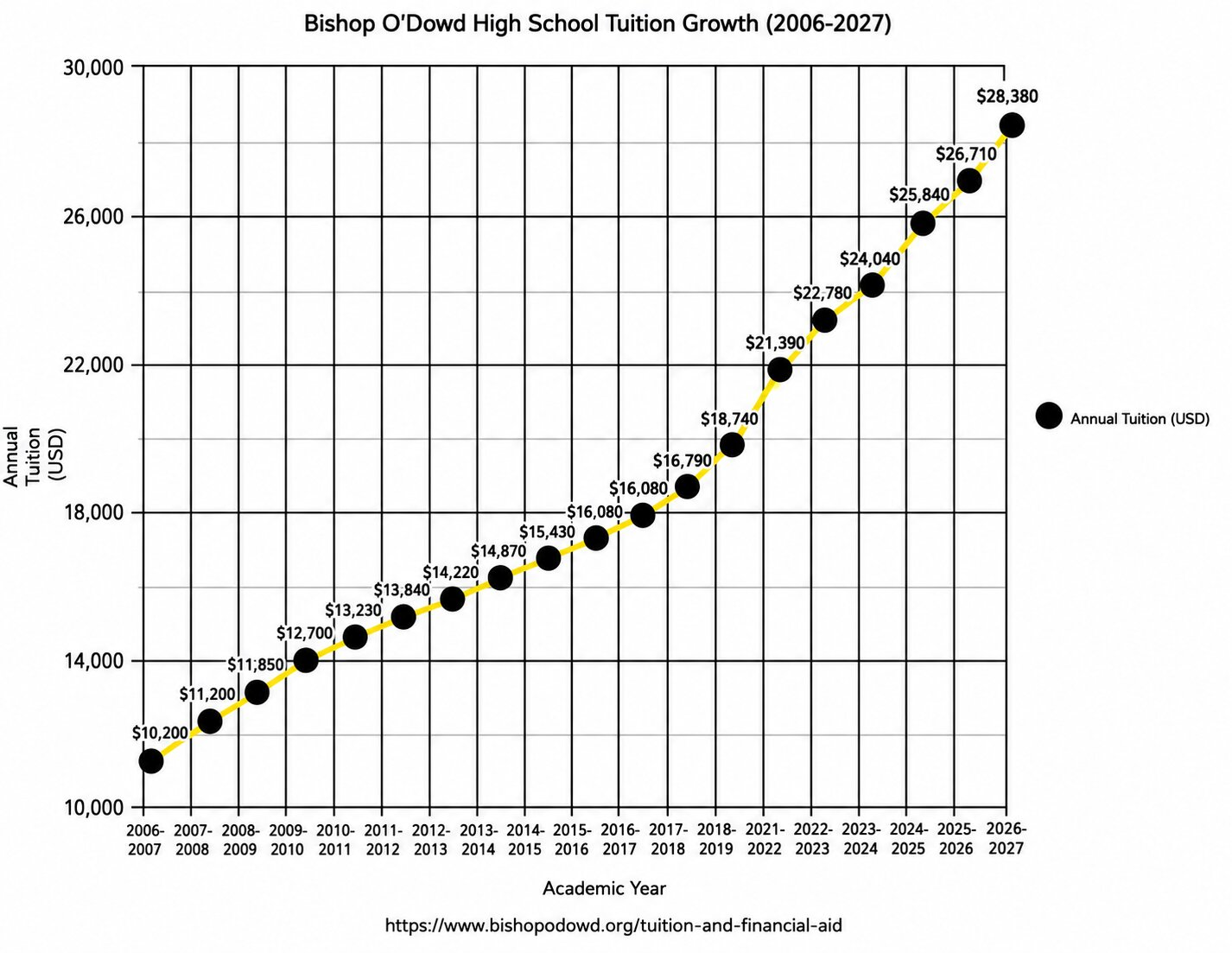
Bishop O'Dowd High School tuition growth (2006–2027).

As of the 2026–2027 school year, tuition is $28,380, a 170.3% increase in the past 20 years, outpacing the national inflation rate of 65.3%. This rapid growth has prompted concerns among students and locals regarding the school's long-term economic accessibility. Critics have discussed the school's role in the broader context of gentrification in the Oakland Hills, balancing its traditional Catholic roots with its current standing as an expensive private school in the East Bay.

== In popular culture ==
Bishop O'Dowd High School is the setting of Gene Luen Yang's 2020 graphic novel, Dragon Hoops. The work provides a non-fiction account of the school's 2015 men's basketball season, ending with their CIF Open Division Championship victory. Yang was a computer science teacher and the director of information services at Bishop O'Dowd for 17 years. He used the story to explore its history, its athletic legacy, and the personal lives of its student-athletes. The book was a 2021 Michael L. Printz Award Honor book and a National Book Award longlist selection.

== Notable alumni ==
Notable Bishop O'Dowd alumni involved in athletics include several National Football League (NFL) players, such as Eric Bjornson, Tarik Glenn, Jevon Holland, Austin Jones, Kevin King, Terique Owens, Burl Toler III, Alijah Vera-Tucker, and Langston Walker, along with linebacker and radio analyst Kirk Morrison. Notable basketball figures include players Brandon Ashley, Grady Livingston, Ivan Rabb, and Brian Shaw, as well as coach Johnnie Bryant. Other alumni in professional sports include baseball players Ryan Drese, Jeff Kobernus, and Tyson Ross, soccer player Venus James, and Olympic runner Alexi Pappas.

Several alumni are known for their work in the arts, entertainment, and media. These include comics artist Sean Aaberg, musician and filmmaker Matt Bettinelli-Olpin, actor and filmmaker Michael A. Goorjian, and the members of the pop-punk band The Matches. The school is also the alma mater of several writers and journalists, such as novelist Jasmine Guillory, and Alexi Pappas, who is also recognized as an author and filmmaker.

Other notable alumni include figures in law, public life, and technology. Graduates include lawyers and authors Maya Harris and her daughter, Meena Harris. Attorney and former Chief Judge of the United States Bankruptcy Court Dennis Montali and Magic: The Gathering Hall of Fame game designer Luis Scott-Vargas are also graduates.

== See also ==
- Saint Mary's College High School
