= Horse (Salvatore Ganacci song) =

Single by Salvatore Ganacci
- Released: April 17, 2019
- Genre: Hardbass; Tech house
- Length: 2:46
- Label: Owsla
- Songwriters: Emir Kobilić; Richard Zastenker
- Producers: Salvatore Ganacci; LIOHN

Salvatore Ganacci singles chronology
"Cake" (2019)	"Horse" (2019)

Music video
- "Horse" on YouTube

"Horse" is a single by Swedish DJ Salvatore Ganacci. American record label Owsla released the single along with a music video on 17 April 2019. The music video was nominated for and won a Grammis for Music Video of the Year in 2020.

== Music video ==
A music video for "Horse" was released on 19 April 2019. The video was directed by Vedran Rupic. Ganacci described the video as a message of love.

== Concept ==
The video begins with a group of people in the forest torturing animals, before Ganacci is alerted by an eagle and arrives driving a shoe. He then subjects the torturers to the very punishments they were inflicting on the animals. Ganacci worked with director Vedran Rupic and said about the clip "My message is always about love, but I really love to experiment with what love can be."

== Reception ==
PopMatters listed "Horse" and also Party Favor's "Wasabi" which featured Ganacci in its best dance tracks for 2019.Billboard commented "it's kind of funny, but mostly it's just bizarre". As of April 2023, the video on OWSLA's official YouTube channel had over 51 million views. DJ Mag praised "Horse" for its high energy and the outlandish nature of the music video. EDMSauce also enjoyed the weird nature, adding a moral to the video relating to animal cruelty. Chris Stack of Dancing Astronaut also enjoyed the single, writing that listeners would be reminded of other dance songs from the 1990s. EDM.com simply headlined the video with a "can't unwatch" impact.

== Awards and nominations ==
Year	Ceremony	Award	Nominated work	Result	Ref.
2019	Cannes Film Festival	Young Directors Award	"Horse"	Won	
2020	Grammis	Music Video of the Year	"Horse"	Won	
