= Olympic Dreams (film) =

2019 American romantic film

- Theatrical release poster
- Directed by: Jeremy Teicher
- Written by: Alexi Pappas; Jeremy Teicher; Nick Kroll
- Produced by: Jeremy Teicher; Alexi Pappas; Nick Kroll; Will Rowbotham; Nora May
- Starring: Alexi Pappas; Nick Kroll; Gus Kenworthy; Morgan Schild
- Cinematography: Jeremy Teicher
- Edited by: Pete Ohs
- Music by: Jay Wadley; Annie Hart
- Production companies: Olympic Channel Productions; 3 Arts Entertainment
- Distributed by: IFC Films
- Release dates: March 10, 2019 (South by Southwest); February 14, 2020 (United States)
- Running time: 83 minutes
- Country: United States
- Language: English
- Box office: $29,450

Olympic Dreams is a 2019 American romance film directed by Jeremy Teicher and written by Alexi Pappas, Jeremy Teicher and Nick Kroll. The film stars Alexi Pappas, Nick Kroll, Gus Kenworthy and Morgan Schild. The film was released on February 14, 2020, by IFC Films.

== Cast ==
- Alexi Pappas as Penelope
- Nick Kroll as Ezra
- Gus Kenworthy as Gus
- Morgan Schild as Maggie

== Release ==
The film premiered at South by Southwest on March 10, 2019. On June 17, 2019, IFC Films acquired distribution rights to the film. The film was released on February 14, 2020, by IFC Films.

== Reception ==
The review aggregator website Rotten Tomatoes gives the film an approval rating of 70%, with an average rating of 6.1/10 based on 47 reviews. The website's consensus reads: "Even if it's mainly distinguished by its unique setting, Olympic Dreams remains a romcom with a heartfelt story and likable leads." On Metacritic, the film has a score of 55 out of 100, based on 12 critics, indicating "mixed or average reviews".
