= 2015–16 Colorado State Rams women's basketball team =

Intercollegiate basketball season

2015–16 Colorado State Rams women's basketball

Navy Classic Champions Mountain West Regular Season & Tournament Champions

NCAA Women's Tournament, first round
- Conference: Mountain West Conference

Ranking
- AP: No. 22
- Record: 31–2 (18–0 Mountain West)
- Head coach: Ryun Williams (4th season)
- Assistant coaches: Tim Moser; Brooke Atkinson; Rebecca Alvidrez
- Home arena: Moby Arena

2015–16 Mountain West Conference women's basketball standings
	Conf.				Overall
Team	W		L	PCT	W		L	PCT
No. 22 Colorado State †	18	–	0	1.000	31	–	2	.939
Fresno State	15	–	3	.833	22	–	12	.647
Boise State	12	–	6	.667	19	–	11	.633
San Jose State	11	–	7	.611	13	–	17	.433
UNLV	9	–	9	.500	18	–	14	.563
New Mexico	9	–	9	.500	17	–	15	.531
Utah State	8	–	10	.444	14	–	17	.452
Wyoming	6	–	12	.333	13	–	16	.448
San Diego State	6	–	12	.333	12	–	19	.387
Nevada	4	–	14	.222	5	–	25	.167
Air Force	1	–	17	.056	1	–	29	.033
† 2016 MWC tournament winner Rankings from AP poll

The 2015–16 Colorado State Rams women's basketball team represented Colorado State University in the 2015–16 college basketball season. The Rams, led by fourth year head coach Ryun Williams, played their home games at Moby Arena and were members of the Mountain West Conference. They finished the season 31–2, 18–0 in Mountain West play to win the regular season championship. They also won the Mountain West women's tournament and earn an automatic trip to the NCAA women's tournament, where they lost to South Florida in the first round.

== Roster ==
2015–16 Colorado State Rams women's basketball team
Players
Coaches

Pos.	#	Name	Height	Year	Previous school	Hometown
G	2	Stine Aistgulen	5 ft 11 in (1.8 m)	RS So	Langhaugen Videregaende	Bergen, Norway
F	3	Keyora Wharry	5 ft 10 in (1.78 m)	Sr	Edison; Fresno City	Fresno, CA
F	4	Emilie Hesseldal	6 ft 1 in (1.85 m)	Sr	Aabyhøj/Horsholm 79ers Eckerd College	Aarhus, Denmark
G	5	Sofie Tryggedsson	6 ft 0 in (1.83 m)	Fr	Aabyhøj	Aarhus, Denmark
G	10	Hannah Tvrdy	5 ft 10 in (1.78 m)	Jr	Seward; Nebraska	Seward, NE
G/F	12	Callie Kasier	5 ft 10 in (1.78 m)	Fr	Broomfield	Broomfield, CO
G	13	Ellen Nystrom	6 ft 1 in (1.85 m)	Jr	Luleå Gymnasieskola	BLuleå, Sweden
G	14	Jamie Patrick	5 ft 10 in (1.78 m)	Sr	Hutchinson	Hutchinson, KS
F	15	Veronika Mirkovic	6 ft 1 in (1.85 m)	So	Sandagymnasiet	Nässjö, Sweden
G	20	Kincso Kelemen	5 ft 9 in (1.75 m)	So	Szekely Miko Kollegium	Sfântu Gheorghe, Romania
G/F	21	Myanne Hamm	5 ft 11 in (1.8 m)	RS So	Poudre	Fort Collins, CO
F	22	Elin Gustavsson	6 ft 3 in (1.91 m)	Jr	Sandagymnasiet	Ängelholm, Sweden
G	23	Taylor Ely	5 ft 11 in (1.8 m)	So	Norman	Norman, OK
F	24	Amanda Kantzy	6 ft 3 in (1.91 m)	Fr	Luleå Basketball Club	Vällingby, Sweden
F	34	Alana Arias	6 ft 4 in (1.93 m)	Sr	Liberty Christian; Palm Beach State	Porto Alegre, Brazil

Head coach

- Ryun Williams (South Dakota)

Assistant coach(es)

- Tim Moser (CSU Pueblo)
- Brooke Atkinson (Wichita State)
- Rebecca Alvidrez (Montana State)

Legend

- (C) Team captain
- (S) Suspended
- (I) Ineligible
- (W) Walk-on
- Injured
- Current redshirt

Roster

== Schedule ==
Date time, TV	Rank^{#}	Opponent^{#}	Result	Record	Site (attendance) city, state
Exhibition
11/06/2015*; 7:00 pm		USC Aiken	W 77–43		Moby Arena (895); Fort Collins, CO
Non-conference regular season
11/13/2015*; 7:00 pm		Western State (Colorado)	W 84–42	1–0	Moby Arena (1,173); Fort Collins, CO
11/17/2015*; 7:00 pm		Incarnate Word	W 60–37	2–0	Moby Arena (688); Fort Collins, CO
11/21/2015*; 7:00 pm		BYU	W 61–55	3–0	Moby Arena (1,057); Fort Collins, CO
11/24/2015*; 5:00 pm		at Penn	L 48–49	3–1	Palestra (393); Philadelphia, PA
11/27/2015*; 1:30 pm		vs. Morgan State; Navy Classic semifinals	W 54–36	4–1	Alumni Hall (607); Annapolis, MD
11/28/2015*; 4:00 pm		at Navy; Navy Classic championship	W 82–73 ^{2OT}	5–1	Alumni Hall (317); Annapolis, MD
12/02/2015*; 7:00 pm		Colorado; Rivalry	W 64–63	6–1	Moby Arena (2,049); Fort Collins, CO
12/08/2015*; 7:00 pm, CET		at Northern Colorado; Rivalry	W 62–46	7–1	Bank of Colorado Arena (907); Greeley, CO
12/10/2015*; 7:00 pm		Montana	W 75–44	8–1	Moby Arena (1,127); Fort Collins, CO
12/13/2015*; 7:00 pm		Oklahoma Panhandle State	W 90–45	9–1	Moby Arena (972); Fort Collins, CO
12/20/2015*; 4:00 pm		at Denver	W 74–46	10–1	Magness Arena (495); Denver, CO
Mountain West regular season
01/02/2016; 2:00 pm		Boise State	W 68–64	11–1 (1–0)	Moby Arena (1,776); Fort Collins, CO
01/06/2016; 8:00 pm		at UNLV	W 64–56	12–1 (2–0)	Cox Pavilion (842); Paradise, NV
01/09/2016; 2:00 pm		San Jose State	W 76–54	13–1 (3–0)	Moby Arena (1,612); Fort Collins, CO
01/13/2016; 7:30 pm		at San Diego State	W 60–57	14–1 (4–0)	Viejas Arena (255); San Diego, CA
01/16/2016; 2:00 pm		at Utah State	W 69–49	15–1 (5–0)	Smith Spectrum (577); Logan, UT
01/20/2016; 7:00 pm		Air Force	W 71–47	16–1 (6–0)	Moby Arena (1,225); Fort Collins, CO
01/27/2016; 8:00 pm		at San Jose State	W 80–78	17–1 (7–0)	Event Center Arena (492); San Jose, CA
01/30/2016; 2:00 pm		Wyoming; Border War	W 63–42	18–1 (8–0)	Moby Arena (2,837); Fort Collins, CO
02/03/2016; 7:00 pm		San Diego State	W 70–54	19–1 (9–0)	Moby Arena (1,005); Fort Collins, CO
02/06/2016; 5:00 pm		at Nevada	W 64–37	20–1 (10–0)	Lawlor Events Center (819); Reno, NV
02/10/2016; 7:00 pm		at Boise State	W 83–51	21–1 (11–0)	Taco Bell Arena (1,545); Boise, ID
02/13/2016; 2:00 pm		UNLV	W 83–52	22–1 (12–0)	Moby Arena (2,353); Fort Collins, CO
02/17/2016; 7:00 pm		Utah State	W 91–64	23–1 (13–0)	Moby Arena (1,505); Fort Collins, CO
02/20/2016; 2:00 pm		at Wyoming; Border War	W 62–57	24–1 (14–0)	Arena-Auditorium (3,269); Laramie, WY
02/24/2016; 7:00 pm	No. 25	at New Mexico	W 49–48	25–1 (15–0)	The Pit (6,107); Albuquerque, NM
02/27/2016; 2:00 pm	No. 25	Nevada	W 74–56	26–1 (16–0)	Moby Arena (2,376); Fort Collins, CO
03/01/2016; 7:00 pm	No. 22	Fresno State	W 68–55	27–1 (17–0)	Moby Arena (2,114); Fort Collins, CO
03/04/2016; 7:00 pm	No. 22	at Air Force	W 81–48	28–1 (18–0)	Clune Arena (717); Colorado Springs, CO
Mountain West Women's Tournament
03/08/2016; 1:00 pm	(1) No. 22	vs. (9) San Diego State; Quarterfinals	W 53–41	29–1	Thomas & Mack Center; Paradise, NV
03/09/2016; 7:30 pm	(1) No. 22	vs. (4) New Mexico; Semifinals	W 60–42	30–1	Thomas & Mack Center; Paradise, NV
03/11/2016; 1:00 pm	(1) No. 22	vs. (2) Fresno State; Championship Game	W 55–54	31–1	Thomas & Mack Center (3,219); Paradise, NV
NCAA Women's Tournament
03/19/2016*; 7:00 pm, ESPN2	(11 B) No. 22	vs. (6 B) No. 21 South Florida; First Round	L 45–48	31–2	Pauley Pavilion (2,552); Los Angeles, CA
*Non-conference game. ^{#}Rankings from AP Poll. (#) Tournament seedings in parentheses. B=Bridgeport region. All times are in Mountain Time.

== Rankings ==
2015–16 NCAA Division I women's basketball rankings

Regular season polls
Poll	Pre- Season	Week 2	Week 3	Week 4	Week 5	Week 6	Week 7	Week 8	Week 9	Week 10	Week 11	Week 12	Week 13	Week 14	Week 15	Week 16	Week 17	Week 18	Week 19	Final
AP	NR	NR	NR	NR	NR	NR	NR	NR	NR	NR	RV	RV	RV	RV	RV	25	22т	22	22	N/A
Coaches	NR	NR	NR	NR	NR	NR	NR	NR	NR	NR	NR	NR	NR	RV	RV	25	23	22	22	RV

Legend
	Increase in ranking
	Decrease in ranking
	No change
(RV)	Received votes
(NR)	Not ranked

== See also ==
- 2015–16 Colorado State Rams men's basketball team
