= 2015–16 BYU Cougars women's basketball team =

Intercollegiate basketball season

2015–16 BYU Cougars women's basketball

2015 Tom Weston Invitational Champs 2015–16 WCC Regular Season Champs

NCAA Women's Tournament, first round
- Conference: West Coast Conference
- Record: 26–7 (16–2 WCC)
- Head coach: Jeff Judkins (15th season)
- Assistant coaches: Melinda Bendall (5th season); Ray Stewart (5th season); Dan Nielson (3rd season)
- Home arena: Marriott Center

2015–16 West Coast Conference women's basketball standings
	Conf.				Overall
Team	W		L	PCT	W		L	PCT
BYU	16	–	2	.889	26	–	7	.788
Saint Mary's	14	–	4	.778	24	–	8	.750
San Diego	13	–	5	.722	24	–	8	.750
Santa Clara	13	–	5	.722	23	–	9	.719
Gonzaga	10	–	8	.556	19	–	14	.576
San Francisco †	9	–	9	.500	21	–	12	.636
Pacific	6	–	12	.333	13	–	17	.433
Loyola Marymount	6	–	12	.333	11	–	20	.355
Pepperdine	2	–	16	.111	7	–	24	.226
Portland	1	–	17	.056	3	–	27	.100
† Tournament winner As of March 22, 2016; Rankings from AP poll

The 2015–16 BYU Cougars women's basketball team represented Brigham Young University during the 2015–16 college basketball season. It was head coach Jeff Judkins's fifteenth season at BYU. The Cougars, members of the West Coast Conference, played their home games at the Marriott Center. They entered the season as defending WCC Tournament champions. They finished the season 26–7, 16–2 in WCC play to WCC win regular title. They advanced to the championship game of the WCC women's tournament, where they lost to San Francisco. They received an at-large bid to the NCAA women's tournament, where they lost to Missouri in the first round.

== Before the season ==
=== Departures ===
Name	Number	Pos.	Height	Year	Hometown	Notes
Ashley Garfield	3	G	5'10"	Senior	Morgan, Utah	Graduated
Xojian Harry	11	G	5'11"	Senior	Bountiful, Utah	Graduated
Morgan Bailey	41	F	6'2"	Senior	Orem, Utah	Graduated

=== Recruiting ===
==== 2015-16 Class ====
The 2015-16 recruiting class information will be posted as soon as it becomes available.

==== Future Classes ====
New Cougar teammates for the 2016-17 season and beyond will be announced throughout the season. They will be posted here when they are announced.

== 2015–16 media ==
=== BYU Radio Sports Network Affiliates ===
All Lady Cougar games that don't conflict with men's basketball or football games will be featured live on BYU Radio, found nationwide on Dish Network 980, on Sirius XM 143, and online at www.byuradio.org. Home games will be a BYUtv simulcast while road games will be voiced by Robbie Bullough. Select home games and road games will air on TheW.tv.

== Roster ==
2015–16 BYU Cougars women's basketball team
Players
Coaches

Pos.	#	Name	Height	Year	Previous school	Hometown
G	3	Kylie Maeda	5 ft 5 in (1.65 m)	Sr	Iolani	Honolulu, HI
F	4	Amanda Wayment	6 ft 1 in (1.85 m)	So	Fremont	Ogden, UT
F	5	Eternity Galeai	6 ft 0 in (1.83 m)	Fr	Timpanogos	Orem, UT
G	10	Shelbee Molen	5 ft 10 in (1.78 m)	Fr	Fremont	Ogden, UT
G	20	Cassie Broadhead	5 ft 8 in (1.73 m)	RS So	Scotia Glenville	Glenville, NY
G	21	Lexi Rydalch (C)	5 ft 10 in (1.78 m)	Sr	Springville	Mapleton, UT
G/F	22	Kristine Fuller	5 ft 11 in (1.8 m)	RS Jr	Palm Harbor University	Crystal Beach, FL
G	23	Makenzi Morrison	5 ft 8 in (1.73 m)	RS Jr	Alta	Draper, UT
F	25	Alohi Robins-Hardy	6 ft 2 in (1.88 m)	So	Kamehameha Kapalama	Waimānalo, HI
F	32	Kalani Purcell	6 ft 2 in (1.88 m)	Jr	John Paul/Hutchinson CC	Hamilton, NZ
F	33	Jasmine Moody	6 ft 2 in (1.88 m)	Fr	Radford	Honolulu, HI
F	34	Micaelee Orton	6 ft 2 in (1.88 m)	RS Jr	Kearns	Kearns, UT
F	35	Brooke Romney	6 ft 1 in (1.85 m)	So	Woodrow Wilson/ASFM	Dallas, TX
F	43	Haley Bodnar (I) (redshirt)	6 ft 3 in (1.91 m)	So	Desert Hills/Purdue	St. George, UT
C	50	MaCayla Hanks	6 ft 4 in (1.93 m)	Fr	Mountain Crest	Millville, UT

Head coach

- Jeff Judkins (Utah)

Assistant coach(es)

- Melinda Bendall (BYU)
- Ray Stewart (Utah Valley)
- Dan Nielson (BYU)
- Ashley Garfield- Director of Operations (BYU)

Legend

- (C) Team captain
- (S) Suspended
- (I) Ineligible
- (W) Walk-on
- Injured
- Current redshirt

Roster
Last update: 2015-11-04

== Schedule ==
Date time, TV	Rank^{#}	Opponent^{#}	Result	Record	Site city, state
Exhibition
11/05/2015*; 7:00 pm, TheW.tv		Ft. Lewis	W 77–67	–	Marriott Center; Provo, UT
Non-conference regular season
11/13/2015*; 3:00 pm, BYUtv		Utah Valley	W 78–62	1–0	Marriott Center; Provo, UT
11/19/2015*; 5:00 pm, FSSW+/FCS Atlantic		at No. 17/24 x-Oklahoma	L 47–73	1–1	Lloyd Noble Center; Norman, OK
11/21/2015*; 7:00 pm, MW Net		at x-Colorado State	L 55–61	1–2	Moby Arena; Ft. Collins, CO
11/24/2015*; 11:00 am, BYUtv		Utah State	W 81–69	2–2	Marriott Center; Provo, UT
11/27/2015*; 6:00 pm		vs. x-Georgia; Radisson Thanksgiving Classic	L 58–66	2–3	Matadome; Northridge, CA
11/28/2015*; 3:00 pm		vs. Penn State; Radisson Thanksgiving Classic	W 63–51	3–3	Matadome; Northridge, CA
12/02/2015*; 10:00 pm, BYU-H SN		at BYU-Hawaiʻi; Tom Weston Invitational	W 85–40	4–3	George Q. Cannon Activities Center; Laie, HI
12/03/2015*; 9:00 pm, BYU-H SN		vs. Hawai′i; Tom Weston Invitational	W 67–56	5–3	George Q. Cannon Activities Center; Laie, HI
12/05/2015*; 5:00 pm, BYU-H SN		vs. No. 12/11 Texas A&M; Tom Weston Invitational	W 72–64	6–3	George Q. Cannon Activities Center; Laie, HI
12/10/2015*; 7:00 pm, Watch Big Sky		at x-Weber State	W 68–51	7–3	Dee Events Center; Ogden, UT
12/12/2015*; 2:00 pm, BYUtv		Utah; Deseret First Duel	W 73–59	8–3	Marriott Center; Provo, UT
WCC regular season
12/23/2015; 2:00 pm, TheW.tv		at San Diego	L 65–78	8–4 (0–1)	Jenny Craig Pavilion; San Diego, CA
12/31/2015; 1:00 pm, BYUtv		Saint Mary's	W 65–59	9–4 (1–1)	Marriott Center; Provo, UT
01/02/2016; 2:00 pm, BYUtv		Pacific	W 79–62	10–4 (2–1)	Marriott Center; Provo, UT
01/07/2016; 7:00 pm, TheW.tv		at x-Santa Clara	W 68–63	11–4 (3–1)	Leavey Center; Santa Clara, CA
01/09/2016; 3:00 pm, TheW.tv		at x-San Francisco	W 66–57	12–4 (4–1)	War Memorial Gymnasium; San Francisco, CA
01/14/2016; 7:00 pm, BYUtv		Gonzaga	W 58–54	13–4 (5–1)	Marriott Center; Provo, UT
01/16/2016; 2:00 pm, BYUtv		Portland	W 78–66	14–4 (6–1)	Marriott Center; Provo, UT
01/21/2016; 6:00 pm, BYUtv		Loyola Marymount	W 75–61	15–4 (7–1)	Marriott Center; Provo, UT
01/23/2016; 2:00 pm, BYUtv		Pepperdine	W 69–64	16–4 (8–1)	Marriott Center; Provo, UT
01/28/2016; 7:00 pm, TheW.tv		at Loyola Marymount	W 82–75	17–4 (9–1)	Gersten Pavilion; Los Angeles, CA
01/30/2016; 2:00 pm, TheW.tv		at x-Pepperdine	W 77–66	18–4 (10–1)	Firestone Fieldhouse; Malibu, CA
02/04/2016; 8:00 pm, TheW.tv		at Pacific	W 67–57	19–4 (11–1)	Alex G. Spanos Center; Stockton, CA
02/06/2016; 2:00 pm, TheW.tv		at Saint Mary's	W 65–44	20–4 (12–1)	McKeon Pavilion; Moraga, CA
02/11/2016; 6:00 pm, BYUtv		San Francisco	W 65–62	21–4 (13–1)	Marriott Center; Provo, UT
02/13/2016; 12:00 pm, BYUtv		Santa Clara	W 70–63	22–4 (14–1)	Marriott Center; Provo, UT
02/18/2016; 7:00 pm, BYUtv		San Diego	W 68–60	23–4 (15–1)	Marriott Center; Provo, UT
02/25/2016; 8:00 pm, TheW.tv	No. RV/22	at Portland	W 84–59	24–4 (16–1)	Chiles Center; Portland, OR
02/27/2016; 3:00 pm, TheW.tv	No. RV/22	at x-Gonzaga	L 55–73	24–5 (16–2)	McCarthey Athletic Center; Spokane, WA
2016 WCC Tournament
03/04/2016; 1:00 pm, BYUtv	(1)	vs. (9) Pepperdine; Quarterfinals	W 72–59	25–5	Orleans Arena; Paradise, NV
03/07/2016; 1:00 pm, BYUtv	(1)	vs. (4) Santa Clara; Semifinals	W 87–67	26–5	Orleans Arena; Paradise, NV
03/08/2016; 2:00 pm, ESPNU	(1)	vs. (6) San Francisco; Championship Game	L 68–70	26–6	Orleans Arena; Paradise, NV
NCAA Women's Tournament
03/19/2016*; 4:30 pm, ESPN2; ESPN3	(7)	vs. (10) x-Missouri; First Round	L 69–78	26–7	Frank Erwin Center; Austin, TX
*Non-conference game. ^{#}Rankings from AP Poll / Coaches' Poll. (#) Tournament seedings in parentheses. All times are in Mountain.

All BYUtv games, minus the home game vs. Gonzaga, were simulcast on BYU Radio with the BYUtv announcers, listed below. Select other games, listed with an x, were broadcast on BYU Radio with Robbie Bullough on the call. The WCC Championship was also on BYU Radio with Dave McCann & Blaine Fowler providing the call.

== Game summaries ==
=== Exhibition: Fort Lewis College ===
Broadcasters: Robbie Bullough & Ashley Garfield
Starting Lineups:

- Ft. Lewis: Astrea Reed, Michelle Turner, Kate Bayes, Kylie Santos, Mary Rambo
- BYU: Kylie Maeda, Lexi Rydalch, Makenzi Pulsipher, Kalani Purcell, Micaelee Orton

TheW.tv

November 5
7 p.m. MST

Recap

Fort Lewis Skyhawks 67, BYU Cougars 77
Scoring by quarter: 14–15, 19–22, 17–29, 17–11
Pts: Kate Bayes 14; Rebs: Michelle Turner, Kate Bayes, Mary Rambo 4 each Asts: Sydni Brandon 4	Pts: Makenzi Pulsipher 17; Rebs: Lexi Rydalch 8 Asts: Lexi Rydalch, Kristine Nielson 4 each

Marriott Center
Provo, UT
Attendance: 314
Referees: Darren Krzesnik, In'Fini Robinson, Rigo Vasquez

=== Utah Valley ===
Broadcasters: Spencer Linton, Kristen Kozlowski, & Jason Shepherd
Series History: BYU leads series 5–0
Starting Lineups:

- Utah Valley: Mariah Seals, Georgia Agnew, Rhaiah Spooner-Knight, Taylor Gordon, Sam Loggins
- BYU: Kylie Maeda, Lexi Rydalch, Makenzi Pulsipher, Kalani Purcell, Micaelee Orton

BYUtv

Nov 13
3 p.m. MST

Recap

Utah Valley Wolverines 62, BYU Cougars 78
Scoring by quarter: 16–15, 9–21, 17–26, 20–16
Pts: Sam Loggins 15; Rebs: Sam Loggins 8 Asts: Mariah Seals, Rhaiah Spooner-Knight, Taylor Gordon 3	Pts: Makenzi Pulsipher 27; Rebs: Amanda Wayment, Kalani Purcell 7 Asts: Kylie Maeda 7

Marriott Center
Provo, UT
Attendance: 898
Referees: Penny Davis, Larena Ahumada, Brad Schmidt

=== Oklahoma ===
Broadcasters: Bob Carpenter & Dan Hughes
Series History: Oklahoma leads series 3–1
Starting Lineups:

- BYU: Kylie Maeda, Lexi Rydalch, Makenzi Pulsipher, Kalani Purcell, Micaelee Orton
- Oklahoma: Peyton Little, Derica Wyatt, Gabbi Ortiz, Maddie Manning, Kaylon Williams

FCSA

Nov 19
6 p.m. CST

Recap

BYU Cougars 47, #17/24 Oklahoma Sooners 73
Scoring by quarter: 17–26, 8–14, 15–25, 7–8
Pts: Lexi Rydalch 15; Rebs: Kalani Purcell 14; Asts: Kalani Purcell 5	Pts: Peyton Little 21; Rebs: Maddie Manning 7 Asts: Maddie Manning 5

Lloyd Noble Center
Norman, OK
Attendance: 3,849
Referees: Beverly Roberts, Tina Napier, Julles Gallien

=== Colorado State ===
Broadcaster: Matt Wozniak
Series History: BYU leads series 54–22
Starting Lineups:

- BYU: Kylie Maeda, Lexi Rydalch, Makenzi Pulsipher, Kalani Purcell, Micaelee Orton
- Colorado State: Keyora Wharry, Emilie Hesseldal, Ellen Nystrom, Jamie Patrick, Elin Gustavsson

MW Net

Nov 21
7 p.m. MST

Recap

BYU Cougars 55, Colorado State Rams 61
Scoring by quarter: 10–17, 14–16, 12–11, 19–17
Pts: Lexi Rydalch 29; Rebs: Lexi Rydalch 11; Asts: Cassie Broadhead 4	Pts: Keyora Wharry 14; Rebs: Elin Gustavsson 8 Asts: Jamie Patrick 4

Moby Arena
Ft. Collins, CO
Attendance: 1,057
Referees: Lisa Jones, Chuck Gonzales, Jack Jones

=== Utah State ===
Broadcasters: Spencer Linton, Kristen Kozlowski, & Jason Shepherd
Series History: BYU leads series 33–3
Starting Lineups:

- Utah State: Victoria Price, Funda Nakkasoglu, Rachel Brewster, Katie Toole, Deja Mason
- BYU: Kylie Maeda, Lexi Rydalch, Makenzi Pulsipher, Kalani Purcell, Micaelee Orton

BYUtv

Nov 24
11 a.m. MST

Recap

Utah State Aggies 69, BYU Cougars 81
Scoring by quarter: 18–27, 16–23, 15–21, 20–10
Pts: Rachel Brewster 17; Rebs: Deja Mason 7 Asts: Victoria Price 6	Pts: Lexi Rydalch 28; Rebs: Kalani Purcell 21; Asts: Kylie Maeda 7

Marriott Center
Provo, UT
Attendance: 2,808
Referees: Karen Lasuik, Rick Showers, Paul Patterson

=== Thanksgiving Classic: Georgia ===
Series History: First Meeting
Starting Lineups:

- BYU: Kylie Maeda, Amanda Wayment, Lexi Rydalch, Makenzi Pulsipher, Kalani Purcell
- Georgia: Tiaria Griffin, Merritt Hempe, Shacobia Barbee, Marjorie Butler, Mackenzie Engram

Nov 27
5 p.m. PST

Recap

BYU Cougars 58, Georgia Lady Bulldogs 66
Scoring by quarter: 14–13, 13–16, 13–16, 18–21
Pts: Lexi Rydalch 16; Rebs: Lexi Rydalch, Kalani Purcell 9 Asts: Kylie Maeda 3	Pts: Tiaria Griffin 23; Rebs: Merritt Hempe 8 Asts: Marjorie Butler 7

Matadome
Northridge, CA
Attendance: 586
Referees: Norma Leibfreid, Clifford Sims, Kriste Bell

=== Thanksgiving Classic: Penn State ===
Series History: First Meeting
Starting Lineups:

- BYU: Kylie Maeda, Lexi Rydalch, Makenzi Pulsipher, Kalani Purcell, Jasmine Moody
- Penn State: Candice Agee, Keke Sevillian, Teniya Page, Kaliyah Mitchell, Peyton Whitted

Nov 28
2 p.m. PST

Recap

BYU Cougars 63, Penn State Lady Lions 51
Scoring by quarter: 22–11, 13–13, 12–14, 16–13
Pts: Lexi Rydalch 24; Rebs: Kalani Purcell 15; Asts: Cassie Broadhead 4	Pts: Peyton Whitted 15; Rebs: Peyton Whitted, Teniya Page 8 Asts: Teniya Page 4

Matadome
Northridge, CA
Attendance: 498
Referees: Brandon Self, Esther Hsu, Kristen Bell

=== Tom Weston Invitational: BYU-Hawaiʻi ===
Broadcaster: Myck Miller
Series History: BYU leads series 3–0
Starting Lineups:

- BYU: Kylie Maeda, Lexi Rydalch, Makenzi Pulsipher, Kalani Purcell, Jasmine Moody
- BYU-Hawaiʻi: Celeste Claw, Devyn Kauhi, Valerie Nawahine, Emily Nelson, Kjirsten Nelson

BYU-H SN

Dec 2
7 p.m. HST

Recap

BYU Cougars 85, BYU-Hawaiʻi Seasiders 40
Scoring by quarter: 30–8, 17–2, 21–17, 17–13
Pts: Lexi Rydalch 25; Rebs: Kalani Purcell 7 Asts: Makenzi Pulsipher 6	Pts: Valerie Nawahine 17; Rebs: Merritt Hempe 8 Asts: Kjirsten Nelson 9

George Q. Cannon Activities Center
Laie, HI
Attendance: 551
Referees: Laura Rane, Ken Sowby, Ashley Ellis

=== Tom Weston Invitational: Hawaiʻi ===
Broadcaster: Myck Miller
Series History: Hawaiʻi leads series 7–4
Starting Lineups:

- Hawaiʻi: Sarah Toeaina, Ashleigh Karaitiana, Kalei Adolpho, Connie Morris, Destiny King
- BYU: Kylie Maeda, Lexi Rydalch, Makenzi Pulsipher, Kalani Purcell, Jasmine Moody

BYU-H SN

Dec 3
6 p.m. HST

Recap

Hawaiʻi Rainbow Wahine 56, BYU Cougars 67
Scoring by quarter: 12–18, 6–13, 15–23, 23–13
Pts: Kalei Adolpho 17; Rebs: Kalei Adolpho 9 Asts: Ashleigh Karaitiana 4	Pts: Lexi Rydalch 19; Rebs: Kalani Purcell 16; Asts: Kalani Purcell 7

George Q. Cannon Activities Center
Laie, HI
Attendance: 257
Referees: Ashley Ellis, Laura Rahe, Ken Sowby

=== Tom Weston Invitational: Texas A&M ===
Broadcasters: Myck Miller
Series History: First Meeting
Starting Lineups:

- Texas A&M: Khaalia Hillsman, Courtney Williams, Jasmine Lumpkin, Jordan Jones, Courtney Walker
- BYU: Kylie Maeda, Lexi Rydalch, Makenzi Pulsipher, Kalani Purcell, Jasmine Moody

BYU-H SN

Dec 5
2 p.m. HST

Recap

#12/11 Texas A&M Aggies 64, BYU Cougars 72
Scoring by quarter: 12–17, 19–17, 15–18, 18–20
Pts: Chelsea Jennings 17; Rebs: Jordan Jones, Chelsea Jennings, Rachel Mitchell 5 Asts: Jordan Jones 5	Pts: Lexi Rydalch 28; Rebs: Kalani Purcell 10; Asts: Kalani Purcell 7

George Q. Cannon Activities Center
Laie, HI
Attendance: 269
Referees: Laura Rahe, Ashley Ellis, Ken Sowby

=== Weber State ===
Broadcaster: Tyson Ewing
Series History: BYU leads series 42–9
Starting Lineups:

- BYU: Kylie Maeda, Lexi Rydalch, Makenzi Pulsipher, Kalani Purcell, Jasmine Moody
- Weber State: Jocelyn Adams, Deeshyra Thomas, Kailie Quinn, Brittney Dunbar, Regina Okoye

Watch Big Sky

Dec 10
7:45 p.m. MST

Recap

BYU Cougars 68, Weber State Wildcats 51
Scoring by quarter: 17–12, 13–14, 23–16, 15–9
Pts: Lexi Rydalch 25; Rebs: Kalani Purcell 11; Asts: Kalani Purcell 5	Pts: Regina Okoye 11; Rebs: Jocelyn Adams 7 Asts: Brittney Dunbar, Regina Okoye 3

Dee Events Center
Ogden, UT
Attendance: 1,034
Referees: Not listed- showed up half an hour late

=== Utah ===
Broadcasters: Spencer Linton, Kristen Kozlowski, & Jason Shepherd
Series History: Utah leads series 62–41
Starting Lineups:

- Utah: Malia Nawahine, Emily Potter, Paige Crozon, Danielle Rodriguez, Tanaeya Boclair
- BYU: Kylie Maeda, Lexi Rydalch, Makenzi Pulsipher, Kalani Purcell, Jasmine Moody

BYUtv

Dec 12
2 p.m. MST

Recap

Utah Utes 59, BYU Cougars 73
Scoring by quarter: 14–29, 17–11, 11–19, 17–14
Pts: Emily Potter 24; Rebs: Emily Potter 17; Asts: Paige Crozon 3	Pts: Lexi Rydalch 29; Rebs: Kalani Purcell 12; Asts: Makenzi Pulsipher 5

Marriott Center
Provo, UT
Attendance: 1,183
Referees: Penny Davis, Wanda Szeremata, Ifeyinwa Seales

=== San Diego ===
Broadcasters: Paula Bott & Susie Erpelding-Barosso
Series History: BYU leads series 8–2
Starting Lineups:

- BYU: Kylie Maeda, Lexi Rydalch, Makenzi Pulsipher, Kalani Purcell, Jasmine Moody
- San Diego: Malina Hood, Maya Hood, Katherine Hamilton, Cori Woodward, Sydney Williams

TheW.tv

Dec 23
1:05 p.m. PST

Recap

BYU Cougars 65, San Diego Toreros 78
Scoring by quarter: 16–21, 17–15, 13–19, 19–23
Pts: Lexi Rydalch 23; Rebs: Lexi Rydalch 11; Asts: Lexi Rydalch, Kalani Purcell 4	Pts: Malina Hood, Maya Hood, Sydney Williams 17; Rebs: Maya Hood 18; Asts: Cori Woodward 6

Jenny Craig Pavilion
San Diego, CA
Attendance: 1,518
Referees: Melissa Barlow, Anita Ortega, Kimberly Hobbs

=== Saint Mary's ===
Broadcasters: Spencer Linton, Kristen Kozlowski, & Jason Shepherd
Series History: BYU leads series 6–4
Starting Lineups:

- Saint Mary's: Lauren Nicholson, Sydney Raggio, Stella Beck, Devon Brookshire, Samira McDonald
- BYU: Kylie Maeda, Lexi Rydalch, Makenzi Pulsipher, Kalani Purcell, Jasmine Moody

BYUtv

Dec 31
1 p.m. MST

Recap

Saint Mary's Gaels 59, BYU Cougars 65
Scoring by quarter: 19–17, 11–20, 14–13, 15–15
Pts: Lauren Nicholson 17; Rebs: Sydney Raggio 8 Asts: Samira McDonald, Carly Turner 3	Pts: Lexi Rydalch 22; Rebs: Lexi Rydalch 11; Asts: Lexi Rydalch 8

Marriott Center
Provo, UT
Attendance: 1,209
Referees: Robert Scofield, Michol Murray, Kyle Bacon

=== Pacific ===
Broadcasters: Spencer Linton, Kristen Kozlowski, & Jason Shepherd
Series History: BYU leads series 9–2
Starting Lineups:

- Pacific: Emily Simons, GeAnna Luaulu-Summers, Desire Finnie, Hailie Eackles, Najah Queenland
- BYU: Kylie Maeda, Lexi Rydalch, Makenzi Pulsipher, Kalani Purcell, Jasmine Moody

BYUtv

Jan 2
2 p.m. MST

Recap

Pacific Tigers 62, BYU Cougars 79
Scoring by quarter: 10–26, 26–16, 13–21, 19–16
Pts: Desire Finnie 22; Rebs: Najah Queenland 8 Asts: Ameela Li 5	Pts: Lexi Rydalch 26; Rebs: Lexi Rydalch 15; Asts: Kylie Maeda, Kalani Purcell 5

Marriott Center
Provo, UT
Attendance: 809
Referees: Wanda Szeremata, Janeta Graham, Brittany Groves

=== Santa Clara ===
Broadcaster: Doug Greenwald
Series History: BYU leads series 10–1
Starting Lineups:

- BYU: Kylie Maeda, Lexi Rydalch, Makenzi Pulsipher, Kalani Purcell, Jasmine Moody
- Santa Clara: Taylor Berry, Marie Bertholdt, Lori Parkinson, Savanna Hanson, Morgan McGwire

TheW.tv

Jan 7
6 p.m. PST

Recap

BYU Cougars 68, Santa Clara Broncos 63
Scoring by quarter: 16–20, 16–19, 16–10, 20–14
Pts: Lexi Rydalch 27; Rebs: Kalani Purcell 12; Asts: Kylie Maeda 5	Pts: Kyla Martin 14; Rebs: Lori Parkinson 10; Asts: Kyla Martin 5

Leavey Center
Santa Clara, CA
Attendance: N/A
Referees: Penny Davis, Cheryl Flores, Darren Krzesnik

=== San Francisco ===
Broadcaster: George Devine
Series History: BYU leads series 13–2
Starting Lineups:

- BYU: Kylie Maeda, Lexi Rydalch, Makenzi Pulsipher, Kalani Purcell, Jasmine Moody
- San Francisco: Zhane Dikes, Rachel Howard, Michaela Rakova, Taylor Proctor, Kalyn Simon

TheW.tv

Jan 9
2 p.m. PST

Recap

BYU Cougars 66, San Francisco Dons 57
Scoring by quarter: 14–14, 18–15, 6–11, 28–17
Pts: Lexi Rydalch 22; Rebs: Makenzi Pulsipher, Kalani Purcell 4 Asts: Kalani Purcell 9	Pts: Taylor Proctor 14; Rebs: Taylor Proctor 12; Asts: Zhane Dikes 4

War Memorial Gymnasium
San Francisco, CA
Attendance: 386
Referees: Charles Gonzales, Kenneth Nash, Crystal Hogan

=== Gonzaga ===
Broadcasters: Spencer Linton, Kristen Kozlowski, & Jason Shepherd
Series History: Gonzaga leads series 11–7
Starting Lineups:

- Gonzaga: Chelsea Waters, Georgia Striton, Emma Stach, Kiara Kudron, Shelby Cheslek
- BYU: Kylie Maeda, Lexi Rydalch, Makenzi Pulsipher, Kalani Purcell, Jasmine Moody

BYUtv

Jan 14
7 p.m. MST

Recap

Gonzaga Bulldogs 54, BYU Cougars 58
Scoring by quarter: 15–12, 13–8, 14–15, 12–23
Pts: Shelby Cheslek 11; Rebs: Kiara Kudron 8 Asts: Georgia Striton 5	Pts: Lexi Rydalch 18; Rebs: Kalani Purcell 16; Asts: Kylie Maeda 3

Marriott Center
Provo, UT
Attendance: 1,235
Referees: Lisa Jones, Shelly Russi, Brian Woods

=== Portland ===
Broadcasters: Spencer Linton, Kristen Kozlowski, & Jason Shepherd
Series History: BYU leads series 16–4
Starting Lineups:

- Portland: Kaylie Van Loo, Hannah Mattson, Ellie Woerner, Julie Spencer, Ashley Gray
- BYU: Kylie Maeda, Lexi Rydalch, Makenzi Pulsipher, Kalani Purcell, Jasmine Moody

BYUtv

Jan 16
2 p.m. MST

Portland Pilots 66, BYU Cougars 78
Scoring by quarter: 17–21, 13–27, 18–13, 18–17
Pts: Darian Slaga, Julie Spencer 16; Rebs: Ellie Woerner 6 Asts: Kaylie Van Loo 9	Pts: Lexi Rydalch 23; Rebs: Kalani Purcell 11; Asts: Kalani Purcell 8

Marriott Center
Provo, UT
Attendance: 882
Referees: Karen Lasuik, Benny Luna, In'Fini Robinson

=== Loyola Marymount ===
Broadcasters: Spencer Linton, Kristen Kozlowski, & Jason Shepherd
Series History: BYU leads series 10–1
Starting Lineups:

- LMU: Andee Velasco, Deanna Johnson, Sophie Taylor, Leslie Lopez-Wood, Bree Alford
- BYU: Kylie Maeda, Lexi Rydalch, Makenzi Pulsipher, Kalani Purcell, Jasmine Moody

BYUtv

Jan 21
6 p.m. MST

Recap

Loyola Marymount Lions 61, BYU Cougars 75
Scoring by quarter: 15–20, 14–13, 7–18, 25–24
Pts: Cheyanne Wallace, Deanna Johnson 15; Rebs: Sophie Taylor, Bree Alford 10; Asts: Deanna Johnson 3	Pts: Lexi Rydalch 28; Rebs: Kalani Purcell 16; Asts: Cassie Broadhead, Lexi Rydalch, Kalani Purcell 4

Marriott Center
Provo, UT
Attendance: 625
Referees: Michol Murray, Esther Hsu, Ifeyinwa Seales

=== Pepperdine ===
Broadcasters: Spencer Linton, Kristen Kozlowski, & Jason Shepherd
Series History: BYU leads series 10–2
Starting Lineups:

- Pepperdine: Paige Fecske, Erica Ogwumike, Olivia Ogwumike, Kelsey Brockway, Keitra Wallace
- BYU: Kylie Maeda, Lexi Rydalch, Makenzi Pulsipher, Kalani Purcell, Jasmine Moody

BYUtv

Jan 23
2 p.m. MST

Recap

Pepperdine Waves 64, BYU Cougars 69
Scoring by quarter: 17–21, 11–17, 20–16, 16–15
Pts: Paige Fecske, Erica Ogwumike 16; Rebs: Erica Ogwumike, Keitra Wallace, Allie Green 7 Asts: Paige Fecske 4	Pts: Lexi Rydalch 21; Rebs: Kalani Purcell 24; Asts: Kalani Purcell 8

Marriott Center
Provo, UT
Attendance: 1,271
Referees: Brenda Pantoja, Alex Carroll, Felicity Willis

=== Loyola Marymount ===
Broadcasters: Dalton Green & Hunter Patterson
Series History: BYU leads series 11–1
Starting Lineups:

- BYU: Kylie Maeda, Lexi Rydalch, Makenzi Pulsipher, Kalani Purcell, Jasmine Moody
- LMU: Andee Velasco, Deanna Johnson, Sophie Taylor, Leslie Lopez-Wood, Bree Alford

TheW.tv

Jan 28
7 p.m. PST

Recap

BYU Cougars 82, Loyola Marymount Lions 75
Scoring by quarter: 22–24, 18–13, 24–20, 18–18
Pts: Lexi Rydalch 31; Rebs: Kalani Purcell 14; Asts: Kalani Purcell 8	Pts: Sophie Taylor, Deanna Johnson 15; Rebs: Bree Alford 13; Asts: Andee Velasco 7

Gersten Pavilion
Los Angeles, CA
Attendance: 351
Referees: Melissa Barlow, Wanda Szeremeta, Cheryl Flores

=== Pepperdine ===
Broadcaster: Jane Carson
Series History: BYU leads series 11–2
Starting Lineups:

- BYU: Kylie Maeda, Lexi Rydalch, Makenzi Pulsipher, Kalani Purcell, Jasmine Moody
- Pepperdine: Paige Fecske, Erica Ogwumike, Kayla Blair, Allie Green, Kelsey Brockway

TheW.tv

Jan 30
1:05 p.m. PST

Recap

BYU Cougars 77, Pepperdine Waves 66
Scoring by quarter: 13–19, 16–15, 22–14, 26–18
Pts: Lexi Rydalch 37; Rebs: Kalani Purcell 14; Asts: Kalani Purcell 5	Pts: Erica Ogwumike 22; Rebs: Erica Ogwumike, Devin Stanback 7 Asts: Paige Fecske 4

Firestone Fieldhouse
Malibu, CA
Attendance: 208
Referees: Anita Ortega, Lorena Ahumada, Rick Showers

=== Pacific ===
Broadcaster: Don Gubbins
Series History: BYU leads series 10–2
Starting Lineups:

- BYU: Kylie Maeda, Lexi Rydalch, Makenzi Pulsipher, Kalani Purcell, Jasmine Moody
- Pacific: Emily Simons, GeAnna Luaulu-Summers, Desire Finnie, Hailie Eackles, Najah Queenland

TheW.tv

Feb 4
7:05 p.m. PST

Recap

BYU Cougars 67, Pacific Tigers 57
Scoring by quarter: 13–13, 14–13, 23–10, 17–21
Pts: Lexi Rydalch 38; Rebs: Kalani Purcell 10; Asts: Kalani Purcell 6	Pts: Desire Finnie 14; Rebs: Najah Queenland 12; Asts: Najah Queenland 5

Alex G. Spanos Center
Stockton, CA
Attendance: 511
Referees: Kyle Bacon, Cathi Cornell, Esther Hsu

=== Saint Mary's ===
Broadcaster: Elias Feldman
Series History: BYU leads series 7–4
Starting Lineups:

- BYU: Kylie Maeda, Lexi Rydalch, Makenzi Pulsipher, Kalani Purcell, Jasmine Moody
- Saint Mary's: Lauren Nicholson, Devon Brookshire, Megan McKay, Devyn Galland, Samira McDonald

TheW.tv

Feb 6
1:05 p.m. PST

Recap

BYU Cougars 65, Saint Mary's Gaels 44
Scoring by quarter: 21–5, 19–14, 12–19, 13–6
Pts: Makenzi Pulsipher 26; Rebs: Kalani Purcell 9 Asts: Kalani Purcell 10	Pts: Devon Brookshire 11; Rebs: Sydney Raggio 6 Asts: Stella Beck 3

McKeon Pavilion
Moraga, CA
Attendance: 359
Referees: Robert Schofield, Bart Baldwin, In'Fini Robinson

=== San Francisco ===
Broadcasters: Spencer Linton, Kristen Kozlowski, & Jason Shepherd
Series History: BYU leads series 14–2
Starting Lineups:

- San Francisco: Zhane Dikes, Rachel Howard, Michaela Rakova, Anna Seilund, Taylor Proctor
- BYU: Kylie Maeda, Lexi Rydalch, Makenzi Pulsipher, Kalani Purcell, Jasmine Moody

BYUtv

Feb 11
6 p.m. MST

Recap

San Francisco Dons 62, BYU Cougars 65
Scoring by quarter: 25–14, 11–17, 15–12, 11–22
Pts: Taylor Proctor 27; Rebs: Michaela Rakova 8 Asts: Anna Seilund 7	Pts: Lexi Rydalch 27; Rebs: Kalani Purcell 11; Asts: Makenzi Pulsipher 3

Marriott Center
Provo, UT
Attendance: 762
Referees: Anita Ortega, Rick Showers, Tiffany Bird

=== Santa Clara ===
Broadcasters: Spencer Linton, Kristen Kozlowski, & Jason Shepherd
Series History: BYU leads series 11–1
Starting Lineups:

- Santa Clara: Taylor Berry, Marie Bertholdt, Lori Parkinson, Savanna Hanson, Morgan McGwire
- BYU: Kylie Maeda, Lexi Rydalch, Makenzi Pulsipher, Kalani Purcell, Jasmine Moody

BYUtv

Feb 13
12 p.m. MST

Recap

Santa Clara Broncos 63, BYU Cougars 70
Scoring by quarter: 10–12, 17–19, 12–16, 24–23
Pts: Lori Parkinson 17; Rebs: Morgan McGwire 7 Asts: Savanna Hanson 6	Pts: Makenzi Pulsipher 25; Rebs: Kalani Purcell 20; Asts: Kalani Purcell 6

Marriott Center
Provo, UT
Attendance: 1,509
Referees: Charles Gonzales, Wanda Szeremeta, Benny Luna

=== San Diego ===
Broadcasters: Spencer Linton, Kristen Kozlowski & Jason Shepherd
Series History: BYU leads series 8–3
Starting Lineups:

- San Diego: Malina Hood, Maya Hood, Katherine Hamilton, Cori Woodward, Sydney Williams
- BYU: Kylie Maeda, Lexi Rydalch, Makenzi Pulsipher, Kalani Purcell, Jasmine Moody

BYUtv

Feb 18
7 p.m. MST

Recap

San Diego Toreros 60, BYU Cougars 68
Scoring by quarter: 14–16, 15–14, 17–19, 14–19
Pts: Malina Hood, Maya Hood, Katherine Hamilton 12; Rebs: Maya Hood 9 Asts: Katherine Hamilton, Cori Woodward 3	Pts: Lexi Rydalch 33; Rebs: Lexi Rydalch 12; Asts: Kalani Purcell 7

Marriott Center
Provo, UT
Attendance: 2,293
Referees: Penny Davis, Darren Krzesnik, Gordon Torigoe

=== Portland ===
Broadcasters: Cody Barton & Lindsey Gregg
Series History: BYU leads series 17–4
Starting Lineups:

- BYU: Kylie Maeda, Lexi Rydalch, Makenzi Pulsipher, Kalani Purcell, Jasmine Moody
- Portland: Kaylie Van Loo, Ellie Woerner, Julie Spencer, Darian Slaga, Ashley Gray

TheW.tv

Feb 25
7 p.m. PST

Recap

BYU Cougars 84, Portland Pilots 59
Scoring by quarter: 25–12, 26–8, 14–18, 19–21
Pts: Lexi Rydalch 27; Rebs: Kalani Purcell 8 Asts: Kylie Maeda 6	Pts: Ellie Woerner 14; Rebs: Holly Blades 5 Asts: Kaylie Van loo, Hannah Mattson 4

Chiles Center
Portland, OR
Attendance: 334
Referees: Brenda Pantoja, In'Fini Robinson, Tiffany Bird

=== Gonzaga ===
Broadcasters: Sam Adams & Stephanie Hawk-Freeman
Series History: Gonzaga leads series 11–8
Starting Lineups:

- BYU: Kylie Maeda, Lexi Rydalch, Makenzi Pulsipher, Kalani Purcell, Jasmine Moody
- Gonzaga: Chelsea Waters, Georgia Striton, Jill Barta, Shaniqua Nilles, Shelby Cheslek

SWX
TheW.tv

Feb 27
2 p.m. PST

Recap

BYU Cougars 55, Gonzaga Bulldogs 73
Scoring by quarter: 8–14, 16–14, 18–12, 13–33
Pts: Kylie Maeda 19; Rebs: Kalani Purcell 13; Asts: Lexi Rydalch 4	Pts: Jill Barta 23; Rebs: Jill Barta 10; Asts: Jill Barta, Emma Stach 3

McCarthey Athletic Center
Spokane, WA
Attendance: 6,000
Referees: Melissa Barlow, Michol Murray, Richard Waters

=== BYU vs. Pepperdine ===
Broadcasters: Spencer Linton & Kristen Kozlowski
Series History: BYU leads series 12–2
Starting Lineups:

- Pepperdine: Paige Fecske, Devin Stanback, Allie Green, Yasmine Robinson-Bacote, Kelsey Brockway
- BYU: Kylie Maeda, Lexi Rydalch, Makenzi Pulsipher, Kalani Purcell, Jasmine Moody

BYUtv

Mar 4
12:00 pm PST

Recap

Pepperdine Waves 59, BYU Cougars 72
Scoring by quarter: 14–14, 6–16, 15–25, 24–17
Pts: Kelsey Brockway 12; Rebs: Allie Green, Kelsey Brockway 8 Asts: Allie Green 4	Pts: Lexi Rydalch 28; Rebs: Lexi Rydalch 12; Asts: Kalani Purcell 8

Orleans Arena
Paradise, NV
Attendance: 6,261
Referees: Darren Krzesnik, In'Fini Robinson, Cheryl Flores

=== BYU vs. Santa Clara ===
Broadcasters: Dave McCann & Blaine Fowler
Series History: BYU leads series 12–1
Starting Lineups:

- Santa Clara: Taylor Berry, Marie Bertholdt, Lori Parkinson, Savanna Hanson, Morgan McGwire
- BYU: Kylie Maeda, Lexi Rydalch, Makenzi Pulsipher, Kalani Purcell, Jasmine Moody

BYUtv

Mar 7
12:00 p.m. PDT

Recap

Santa Clara Broncos 67, BYU Cougars 87
Scoring by quarter: 12–16, 15–16, 20–21, 20–34
Pts: Lori Parkinson 24; Rebs: Marie Bertholdt 10; Asts: Savanna Hanson 3	Pts: Lexi Rydalch 25; Rebs: Kalani Purcell 17; Asts: Kylie Maeda 5

Orleans Arena
Paradise, NV
Attendance: 6,990
Referees: Shelley Russi, Karen Lasuik, Brian Woods

=== WCC Championship: BYU vs. San Francisco ===
Broadcasters: Roxy Bernstein & Chiney Ogwumike
Series History: BYU leads series 15–2
Starting Lineups:

- San Francisco: Zhane Dikes, Rachel Howard, Michaela Rakova, Anna Seilund, Taylor Proctor
- BYU: Kylie Maeda, Lexi Rydalch, Makenzi Pulsipher, Kalani Purcell, Jasmine Moody

ESPNU

Mar 8
1:00 p.m. PDT

Recap

San Francisco Dons 70, BYU Cougars 68
Scoring by quarter: 14–26, 23–16, 17–16, 16–10
Pts: Taylor Proctor 27; Rebs: Taylor Proctor 10; Asts: Anna Seilund 3	Pts: Lexi Rydalch 23; Rebs: Kalani Purcell 16; Asts: Kylie Maeda 7

Orleans Arena
Paradise, NV
Attendance: 6,816
Referees: Anita Ortega, Michol Murray, Cathi Cornell

=== NCAA First Round: Missouri ===
Broadcasters: Lowell Galindo & Nell Fortner
Series History: Missouri leads series 5–0
Starting Lineups:

- Missouri: Morgan Stock, Sophie Cunningham, Lindsey Cunningham, Cierra Porter, Jordan Frericks
- BYU: Kylie Maeda, Lexi Rydalch, Makenzi Pulsipher, Kalani Purcell, Micaelee Orton

ESPN2/ESPN3

Mar 19
5:45 p.m. CDT

Recap

Missouri Tigers 78, BYU Cougars 69
Scoring by quarter: 15–17, 20–14, 25–18, 18–20
Pts: Sophie Cunningham 20; Rebs: Jordan Frericks 9 Asts: Lindsey Cunningham 5	Pts: Lexi Rydalch 22; Rebs: Kalani Purcell 9 Asts: Kalani Purcell 4

Frank Erwin Center
Austin, TX
Attendance: 2,566
Referees: Lisa Mattingly, Penny Davis, Kathleen Lynch

== Rankings ==
Regular season polls
Poll	Pre- Season	Week 1	Week 2	Week 3	Week 4	Week 5	Week 6	Week 7	Week 8	Week 9	Week 10	Week 11	Week 12	Week 13	Week 14	Week 15	Week 16	Week 17	Week 18	Week 19 Postseason	Final
AP						RV						RV	RV	RV	RV	RV	RV	RV	RV	RV	N/A
Coaches	RV	RV				RV	RV	RV				RV	RV	RV	RV	RV	22	RV	RV	RV	

Legend
	Increase in ranking
	Decrease in ranking
	Not ranked previous week
(RV)	Received Votes

== See also ==
- 2015–16 BYU Cougars men's basketball team
- BYU Cougars women's basketball
