= 2015–16 Fresno State Bulldogs women's basketball team =

Intercollegiate basketball season

2015–16 Fresno State Bulldogs women's basketball

WNIT, Second Round
- Conference: Mountain West Conference
- Record: 22–12 (15–3 Mountain West)
- Head coach: Jaime White (2nd season)
- Assistant coaches: Mandi Carver; Keith Ferguson; Laura Dinkins
- Home arena: Save Mart Center

2015–16 Mountain West Conference women's basketball standings
	Conf.				Overall
Team	W		L	PCT	W		L	PCT
No. 22 Colorado State †	18	–	0	1.000	31	–	2	.939
Fresno State	15	–	3	.833	22	–	12	.647
Boise State	12	–	6	.667	19	–	11	.633
San Jose State	11	–	7	.611	13	–	17	.433
UNLV	9	–	9	.500	18	–	14	.563
New Mexico	9	–	9	.500	17	–	15	.531
Utah State	8	–	10	.444	14	–	17	.452
Wyoming	6	–	12	.333	13	–	16	.448
San Diego State	6	–	12	.333	12	–	19	.387
Nevada	4	–	14	.222	5	–	25	.167
Air Force	1	–	17	.056	1	–	29	.033
† 2016 MWC tournament winner Rankings from AP poll

The 2015–16 Fresno State Bulldogs women's basketball team represented California State University, Fresno during the 2015–16 NCAA Division I women's basketball season. The Bulldogs, led by second year head coach Jaime White, played their home games at the Save Mart Center and were members of the Mountain West Conference. They finished the season 22–12, 15–3 in Mountain West play to finish in second place. They advanced to the championship game of the Mountain West women's tournament, where they lost to Colorado State. They received an automatic bid to the Women's National Invitation Tournament, where they defeated Santa Clara in the first round before losing to Oregon in the second round.

== Roster ==
2015–16 Fresno State Bulldogs women's basketball team
Players
Coaches

Pos.	#	Name	Height	Year	Previous school	Hometown
G	0	Moriah Faulk	5 ft 10 in (1.78 m)	RS Sr	Santa Monica; UCLA	Santa Monica, CA
G	2	Raven Johnson	5 ft 11 in (1.8 m)	Fr	Skyline	Dallas, TX
G	3	Brittany Aikens	5 ft 9 in (1.75 m)	Sr	Floresville; Howard College	Floresville, TX
C	4	Bego Faz Davalos	6 ft 3 in (1.91 m)	RS So	Tecnologico De Monterrey	Monterrey, Mexico
G	10	Candace White	5 ft 8 in (1.73 m)	Fr	Modesto Christian	Modesto, CA
G	11	Alex Furr	5 ft 5 in (1.65 m)	RS Sr	Athens	Athens, TX
G	12	Janae Blount	5 ft 9 in (1.75 m)	RS Jr	Woodson; NW Florida State	Washington, D.C.
F/C	13	Anais Kirvan	6 ft 2 in (1.88 m)	Jr	Burwood; Vincennes	Ashfield, Australia
G	15	Shauqunna Collins	5 ft 4 in (1.63 m)	Sr	Arthur Hill; Garden City CC	Saginaw, MI
G	20	Emilie Volk	5 ft 11 in (1.8 m)	Jr	Bonnieville	Ogden, UT
F	21	Kendra Martin	5 ft 11 in (1.8 m)	Jr	South; Chipola College	Denver, CO
G	22	Zaria Branch	5 ft 10 in (1.78 m)	Fr	Mt. Miguel	San Diego, CA
G	23	Breanne Knishka	5 ft 10 in (1.78 m)	Fr	Cashmere	Dryden, WA
G	25	Tory Jacobs	5 ft 10 in (1.78 m)	So	MacArthur; Minnesota	Dallas, TX
G	32	Natascha Hartvich	5 ft 9 in (1.75 m)	Jr	IMG Academy	Rungsted Kyst, Denmark
C	42	Toni Smith	6 ft 0 in (1.83 m)	Sr	Del City	Del City, OK

Head coach

- Jaime White (Southern Utah)

Assistant coach(es)

- Mandi Carver (Idaho State)
- Keith Ferguson (Bethany (KS))
- Laura Dinkins (Northern Arizona)

Legend

- (C) Team captain
- (S) Suspended
- (I) Ineligible
- (W) Walk-on
- Injured
- Current redshirt

Roster

== Schedule ==
Date time, TV	Rank^{#}	Opponent^{#}	Result	Record	Site (attendance) city, state
Exitbition
11/06/2015*; 5:00 pm		Cal State East Bay	W 65–53		Save Mart Center; Fresno, CA
Non-conference regular season
11/13/2015*; 4:00 pm		at UC Riverside	L 68–86	0–1	UC Riverside Student Recreation Center (229); Riverside, CA
11/17/2015*; 7:00 pm		Fresno Pacific	W 78–33	1–1	Save Mart Center (2,204); Fresno, CA
11/20/2015*; 7:00 pm		Washington	L 79–89	1–2	Save Mart Center (2,983); Fresno, CA
11/23/2015*; 7:00 pm		No. 24 George Washington	L 53–61	1–3	Save Mart Center (2,237); Fresno, CA
11/27/2015*; 2:00 pm		at Saint Mary's; Saint Mary's Classic	L 81–83 ^{OT}	1–4	McKeon Pavilion (477); Moraga, CA
11/28/2015*; 12:00 pm		vs. Northeastern; Saint Mary's Classic	W 69–55	2–4	McKeon Pavilion (101); Moraga, CA
12/02/2015*; 7:00 pm		Cal State Bakersfield	W 57–52	3–4	Save Mart Center (1,983); Fresno, CA
12/05/2015*; 4:00 pm		at Cal Poly	L 60–64	3–5	Mott Gym (475); San Luis Obispo, CA
12/08/2015*; 7:00 pm		Cal State Stanislaus	W 72–49	4–5	Save Mart Center (1,992); Fresno, CA
12/12/2015*; 2:00 pm		San Diego	L 68–72	4–6	Save Mart Center (2,121); Fresno, CA
12/19/2015*; 1:00 pm		at Utah	L 63–78	4–7	Jon M. Huntsman Center (726); Salt Lake City, UT
Mountain West regular season
12/30/2015; 7:00 pm		UNLV	W 58–54	5–7 (1–0)	Save Mart Center (4,760); Fresno, CA
01/02/2016; 1:00 pm		at New Mexico	W 69–65 ^{2OT}	6–7 (2–0)	The Pit (5,493); Albuquerque, NM
01/06/2016; 6:30 pm		at Nevada	W 67–59	7–7 (3–0)	Lawlor Events Center (934); Reno, NV
01/09/2016; 2:00 pm		Boise State	W 62–57	8–7 (4–0)	Save Mart Center (1,663); Fresno, CA
01/16/2016; 2:00 pm		at San Jose State	W 59–54	9–7 (5–0)	Event Center Arena (442); San Jose, CA
01/20/2016; 7:00 pm		San Diego State	W 54–49	10–7 (6–0)	Save Mart Center (1,663); Fresno, CA
01/23/2016; 2:00 pm		Air Force	W 70–46	11–7 (7–0)	Save Mart Center (1,545); Fresno, CA
01/27/2016; 6:00 pm		at Wyoming	W 49–42	12–7 (8–0)	Arena-Auditorium (2,568); Laramie, WY
02/03/2016; 7:00 pm		San Jose State	L 64–66	12–8 (8–1)	Save Mart Center (1,564); Fresno, CA
02/06/2016; 3:00 pm		at UNLV	W 57–52	13–8 (9–1)	Cox Pavilion (1,619); Paradise, NV
02/10/2016; 6:30 pm		at San Diego State	L 54–65 ^{2OT}	13–9 (9–2)	Viejas Arena (319); San Diego, CA
02/14/2016; 2:00 pm		Nevada	W 65–56	14–9 (10–2)	Save Mart Center (1,861); Fresno, CA
02/17/2016; 7:00 pm		Wyoming	W 64–52	15–9 (11–2)	Save Mart Center (1,496); Fresno, CA
02/20/2016; 1:00 pm		at Utah State	W 67–61	16–9 (12–2)	Smith Spectrum (560); Logan, UT
02/24/2016; 6:00 pm		at Air Force	W 63–48	17–9 (13–2)	Clune Arena (675); Colorado Springs, CO
02/27/2016; 2:00 pm		New Mexico	W 51–43	18–9 (14–2)	Save Mart Center (2,109); Fresno, CA
03/01/2016; 6:00 pm		at Colorado State	L 55–68	18–10 (14–3)	Moby Arena (2,114); Fort Collins, CO
03/04/2016; 7:00 pm		Utah State	W 66–62	19–10 (15–3)	Save Mart Center (1,577); Fresno, CA
Mountain West tournament
03/08/2016; 6:00 pm		vs. Utah State; Quarterfinals	W 55–47	20–10	Thomas & Mack Center; Paradise, NV
03/09/2016; 9:00 pm		vs. UNLV; Semifinals	W 66–60	21–10	Thomas & Mack Center (2,160); Paradise, NV
03/11/2016; 12:00 pm		vs. Colorado State; Championship Game	L 54–55	21–11	Thomas & Mack Center (3,219); Paradise, NV
WNIT
03/18/2016*; 7:00 pm		Santa Clara; First Round	W 59–53	22–11	Save Mart Center (1,478); Fresno, CA
03/21/2016*; 6:00 pm		at Oregon; Second Round	L 59–84	22–12	Matthew Knight Arena (1,142); Eugene, OR
*Non-conference game. ^{#}Rankings from AP Poll. (#) Tournament seedings in parentheses. All times are in Pacific Time.

== See also ==
- 2015–16 Fresno State Bulldogs men's basketball team
