= 2015–16 San Jose State Spartans women's basketball team =

Intercollegiate basketball season

2015–16 San Jose State Spartans women's basketball
- Conference: Mountain West Conference
- Record: 13–17 (11–7 Mountain West)
- Head coach: Jamie Craighead (3rd season)
- Assistant coaches: Dan Muscatell; Jourdan Willard; Alle Moreno
- Home arena: Event Center Arena

2015–16 Mountain West Conference women's basketball standings
	Conf.				Overall
Team	W		L	PCT	W		L	PCT
No. 22 Colorado State †	18	–	0	1.000	31	–	2	.939
Fresno State	15	–	3	.833	22	–	12	.647
Boise State	12	–	6	.667	19	–	11	.633
San Jose State	11	–	7	.611	13	–	17	.433
UNLV	9	–	9	.500	18	–	14	.563
New Mexico	9	–	9	.500	17	–	15	.531
Utah State	8	–	10	.444	14	–	17	.452
Wyoming	6	–	12	.333	13	–	16	.448
San Diego State	6	–	12	.333	12	–	19	.387
Nevada	4	–	14	.222	5	–	25	.167
Air Force	1	–	17	.056	1	–	29	.033
† 2016 MWC tournament winner Rankings from AP poll

The 2015–16 San Jose State Spartans women's basketball team represented San José State University during the 2015–16 NCAA Division I women's basketball season. The Spartans, led by third year head coach Jamie Craighead, played their home games at the Event Center Arena as members of the Mountain West Conference. They finished the season 13–17, 11–7 in Mountain West play to finish in fourth place. They lost in the quarterfinals of the Mountain West women's tournament to New Mexico.

== Roster ==
2015–16 San Jose State Spartans women's basketball team
Players
Coaches

Pos.	#	Name	Height	Year	Previous school	Hometown
G	1	Myzhanique Ladd	5 ft 8 in (1.73 m)	So	Cleveland HS	Seattle, WA
G	2	Andrea Kohlhaas	5 ft 10 in (1.78 m)	Fr	Otto-Hahn-Gymnasium	Besigheim, Germany
F	3	Paris Baird	6 ft 2 in (1.88 m)	RS Jr	Windward School	Van Nuys, CA
G	5	Nyre Harris (C)	5 ft 8 in (1.73 m)	Sr	Lincoln HS; U of Arizona	Stockton, CA
F	11	Jasmine Smith (C)	6 ft 0 in (1.83 m)	Jr	Bellarmine-Jefferson HS	Burbank, CA
C	12	Emily Schill (injured)	6 ft 2 in (1.88 m)	RS Jr	Box Hill Secondary	Tecoma, Australia
F	15	Emily Vann	6 ft 0 in (1.83 m)	RS Sr	Saint Mary's College HS; UC Davis	Martinez, CA
G	20	Rachol West	5 ft 10 in (1.78 m)	Jr	Garces Memorial HS	Bakersfield, CA
G	21	Dezz Ramos	5 ft 7 in (1.7 m)	RS Jr	Hunter HS; Weber State	West Valley, UT
F	22	Kalie Matthews	6 ft 0 in (1.83 m)	RS Jr	Sandra Day O'Connor HS; Weber State	Glendale, AZ
F	23	Hallie Gennett (I) (redshirt)	5 ft 11 in (1.8 m)	Jr	Post Falls HS; Sacramento State	Post Falls, ID
F	24	Ellie Stevens (C)	6 ft 0 in (1.83 m)	RS Sr	Geelong College; Idaho State U Lamar CC	Ocean Grove, Australia
C	44	Riana Byrd	6 ft 2 in (1.88 m)	Sr	Inderkum HS	Richmond, CA

Head coach

- Jamie Craighead (Oregon)

Assistant coach(es)

- Dan Muscatell (Western Washington)
- Jourdan Willard (Sacramento State)
- Alle Moreno (Sacramento State)

Legend

- (C) Team captain
- (S) Suspended
- (I) Ineligible
- (W) Walk-on
- Injured
- Current redshirt

Roster

Note: Junior guard Aniya Baker left the team in December for personal reasons.

== Schedule ==
Date time, TV	Rank^{#}	Opponent^{#}	Result	Record	Site (attendance) city, state
Exhibition
11/01/2015*; 2:00 pm		Sonoma State	W 84–61		Event Center Arena (437); San Jose, CA
11/09/2015*; 7:00 pm		Holy Names	W 110–41		Event Center Arena (410); San Jose, CA
Non-conference regular season
11/13/2015*; 7:00 pm		Southern Oregon	W 92–78	1–0	Event Center Arena (297); San Jose, CA
11/15/2015*; 1:00 pm		at Saint Mary's	L 81–91	1–1	McKeon Pavilion (379); Moraga, CA
11/22/2015*; 1:00 pm		at Cal State Bakersfield	L 88–90 ^{OT}	1–2	Icardo Center (577); Bakersfield, CA
11/27/2015*; 7:00 pm		at Washington State	L 80–95	1–3	Beasley Coliseum (632); Pullman, WA
11/30/2015*; 8:00 pm, P12N		at Oregon	L 74–104	1–4	Matthew Knight Arena (1,066); Eugene, OR
12/06/2015*; 2:00 pm		San Francisco	L 78–82	1–5	Event Center Arena (230); San Jose, CA
12/08/2015*; 7:00 pm		South Dakota	L 77–87	1–6	Event Center Arena (217); San Jose, CA
12/12/2015*; 2:00 pm		at Pacific	L 69–81	1–7	Alex G. Spanos Center (417); Stockton, CA
12/17/2015*; 7:00 pm		New Mexico State	L 66–75	1–8	Event Center Arena (224); San Jose, CA
12/20/2015*; 2:00 pm		UC Irvine	W 79–58	2–8	Event Center Arena (311); San Jose, CA
12/22/2015*; 3:00 pm		Hawaiʻi	L 73–76	2–9	Event Center Arena (1,236); San Jose, CA
Mountain West regular season
12/30/2015; 6:00 pm		at Utah State	W 86–74	3–9 (1–0)	Smith Spectrum (266); Logan, UT
01/02/2016; 2:00 pm		Air Force	W 81–60	4–9 (2–0)	Event Center Arena (316); San Jose, CA
01/06/2016; 7:00 pm		San Diego State	W 78–73	5–9 (3–0)	Event Center Arena (325); San Jose, CA
01/09/2016; 1:00 pm		at Colorado State	L 54–76	5–10 (3–1)	Moby Arena (1,612); Fort Collins, CO
01/13/2016; 6:00 pm		at Wyoming	W 67–66	6–10 (4–1)	Arena-Auditorium (2,523); Laramie, WY
01/16/2016; 2:00 pm		Fresno State; Rivalry	L 54–59	6–11 (4–2)	Event Center Arena (442); San Jose, CA
01/20/2016; 7:00 pm		Boise State	L 75–78	6–12 (4–3)	Event Center Arena (324); San Jose, CA
01/23/2016; 1:00 pm		at New Mexico	L 57–71	6–13 (4–4)	The Pit (5,330); Albuquerque, NM
01/27/2016; 7:00 pm		Colorado State	L 78–80	6–14 (4–5)	Event Center Arena (492); San Jose, CA
01/30/2016; 5:00 pm		at Air Force	W 72–49	7–14 (5–5)	Clune Arena (427); Colorado Springs, CO
02/03/2016; 7:00 pm		at Fresno State; Rivalry	W 66–64	8–14 (6–5)	Save Mart Center (1,564); Fresno, CA
02/10/2016; 7:00 pm		UNLV	W 69–61	9–14 (7–5)	Event Center Arena (382); San Jose, CA
02/13/2016; 2:00 pm		New Mexico	W 59–58	10–14 (8–5)	Event Center Arena (291); San Jose, CA
02/17/2016; 6:30 pm		at Nevada	W 76–63	11–14 (9–5)	Lawlor Events Center (905); Reno, NV
02/20/2016; 2:00 pm		at San Diego State	L 70–87	11–15 (9–6)	Viejas Arena (511); San Diego, CA
02/27/2016; 2:00 pm		Utah State	W 83–65	12–15 (10–6)	Event Center Arena (486); San Jose, CA
03/01/2016; 7:00 pm		Wyoming	W 65–51	13–15 (11–6)	Event Center Arena (1,183); San Jose, CA
03/04/2016; 6:00 pm		at Boise State	L 69–81	13–16 (11–7)	Taco Bell Arena (1,006); Boise, ID
Mountain West Women's Tournament
03/08/2016; 2:30 pm	(4)	vs. (5) New Mexico; Quarterfinals	L 51–65	13–17	Thomas & Mack Center (1,864); Paradise, NV
*Non-conference game. ^{#}Rankings from AP Poll. (#) Tournament seedings in parentheses. All times are in Pacific Time.

== See also ==
2015–16 San Jose State Spartans men's basketball team
