= 2015–16 Nevada Wolf Pack women's basketball team =

Intercollegiate basketball season

2015–16 Nevada Wolf Pack women's basketball
- Conference: Mountain West Conference
- Record: 5–25 (4–14 MW)
- Head coach: Jane Albright (9th season)
- Assistant coaches: Camille Williams; Kami Malnaa; Janet Butler
- Home arena: Lawlor Events Center

2015–16 Mountain West Conference women's basketball standings
	Conf.				Overall
Team	W		L	PCT	W		L	PCT
No. 22 Colorado State †	18	–	0	1.000	31	–	2	.939
Fresno State	15	–	3	.833	22	–	12	.647
Boise State	12	–	6	.667	19	–	11	.633
San Jose State	11	–	7	.611	13	–	17	.433
UNLV	9	–	9	.500	18	–	14	.563
New Mexico	9	–	9	.500	17	–	15	.531
Utah State	8	–	10	.444	14	–	17	.452
Wyoming	6	–	12	.333	13	–	16	.448
San Diego State	6	–	12	.333	12	–	19	.387
Nevada	4	–	14	.222	5	–	25	.167
Air Force	1	–	17	.056	1	–	29	.033
† 2016 MWC tournament winner Rankings from AP poll

The 2015–16 Nevada Wolf Pack women's basketball team represented the University of Nevada, Reno during the 2015–16 NCAA Division I women's basketball season. The Wolf Pack, led by ninth year head coach Jane Albright, played their home games at the Lawlor Events Center and were members of the Mountain West Conference. They finished the season 5–25, 4–14 in Mountain West play to finish in tenth place. They lost in the first round of the Mountain West women's tournament to Utah State.

== Roster ==
2015–16 Nevada Wolf Pack women's basketball team
Players
Coaches

Pos.	#	Name	Height	Year	Previous school	Hometown
G	1	Ashlee Jones	5 ft 9 in (1.75 m)	Jr	Bradshaw Christian HS	Sacramento, CA
F	3	Teige Zeller	6 ft 2 in (1.88 m)	So	Los Lunas HS	Los Lunas, NM
G	4	Halie Bergman	5 ft 10 in (1.78 m)	RS So	Turlock HS; Pacific	Turlock, CA
G	10	Stephanie Schmid	5 ft 10 in (1.78 m)	Jr	Arizona Western College	Lake Zurich, IL
G	11	Camariah King	5 ft 6 in (1.68 m)	Fr	Holy Names Academy	Seattle, WA
G	13	T Moe	5 ft 8 in (1.73 m)	RS Jr	Terra Nova HS	Daly City, CA
F	14	Léa Favre	6 ft 1 in (1.85 m)	Fr	Lycée Jeanne d'Arc	St. Légier, Switzerland
G	15	Kelsey Kaelin	5 ft 8 in (1.73 m)	Sr	Tigard HS	Tigard, OR
F	20	Julia Shelbourn	6 ft 3 in (1.91 m)	Sr	Whitewater HS	Whitewater, WI
F	21	Nyasha LeSure	6 ft 0 in (1.83 m)	Sr	Reed HS	Sparks, NV
G/F	22	Mariah Williams	5 ft 11 in (1.8 m)	RS Fr	Vanden HS	Richmond, CA
G	24	MorningRose Tobey	5 ft 7 in (1.7 m)	Fr	Billings West HS	Billings, MT
G	25	Shannon Gough	5 ft 6 in (1.68 m)	Jr	Reno HS	Reno, NV
F	32	A. J. Cephas	6 ft 0 in (1.83 m)	RS Fr	Deer Valley HS	Antioch, CA
G	44	Riana Everidge	6 ft 1 in (1.85 m)	Fr	Park Hill HS	Kansas City, MO

Head coach

- Jane Albright (Wichita State)

Assistant coach(es)

- Camille Williams (UC Santa Barbara)
- Kami Malnaa (Montana State Billings)
- Janet Butler (Nevada)

Legend

- (C) Team captain
- (S) Suspended
- (I) Ineligible
- (W) Walk-on
- Injured
- Current redshirt

Roster

== Schedule ==
Date time, TV	Rank^{#}	Opponent^{#}	Result	Record	Site (attendance) city, state
Exhibition
11/07/2015*; 4:00 pm		Chico State	W 81–52		Lawlor Events Center (769); Reno, NV
Non-conference regular season
11/13/2015*; 6:30 pm		San Diego	L 47–84	0–1	Lawlor Events Center (1,119); Reno, NV
11/15/2015*; 2:00 pm		Montana State	L 53–66	0–2	Lawlor Events Center (897); Reno, NV
11/20/2015*; 6:30 pm		vs. Washington State; Rainbow Wahine Classic	L 57–70	0–3	Stan Sheriff Center; Honolulu, HI
11/22/2015*; 4:30 pm		vs. Loyola Marymount; Rainbow Wahine Classic	L 58–69	0–4	Stan Sheriff Center; Honolulu, HI
11/27/2015*; 4:00 pm		Utah Valley; Nugget Classic	L 65–73	0–5	Lawlor Events Center (1,857); Reno, NV
11/28/2015*; 4:00 pm		Middle Tennessee; Nugget Classic	L 46–90	0–6	Lawlor Events Center (964); Reno, NV
12/01/2015*; 6:30 pm		San Francisco	L 62–70	0–7	Lawlor Events Center (796); Reno, NV
12/06/2015*; 2:00 pm		at UC Irvine	L 64–68	0–8	Bren Events Center (160); Irvine, CA
12/08/2015*; 11:00 am		San Francisco State	W 57–51	1–8	Lawlor Events Center (3,602); Reno, NV
12/17/2015*; 7:00 pm		at Pacific	L 52–74	1–9	Alex G. Spanos Center (395); Stockton, CA
12/22/2015*; 10:00 am		at UIC	L 55–70	1–10	UIC Pavilion (160); Chicago, IL
Mountain West regular season
12/30/2015; 6:30 pm		New Mexico	L 47–51	1–11 (0–1)	Lawlor Events Center (1,060); Reno, NV
01/02/2016; 1:00 pm		at Wyoming	L 53–68	1–12 (0–2)	Arena-Auditorium (2,989); Laramie, WY
01/06/2016; 6:30 pm		Fresno State	L 59–67	1–13 (0–3)	Lawlor Events Center (934); Reno, NV
01/09/2016; 4:00 pm		Air Force	W 68–57	2–13 (1–3)	Lawlor Events Center (1,125); Reno, NV
01/13/2016; 6:00 pm		at Boise State	L 58–66	2–14 (1–4)	Taco Bell Arena (775); Boise, ID
01/20/2016; 6:30 pm		Wyoming	W 68–65	3–14 (2–4)	Lawlor Events Center (917); Reno, NV
01/23/2016; 3:00 pm		at UNLV	L 59–65	3–15 (2–5)	Cox Pavilion (1,609); Paradise, NV
01/27/2016; 6:30 pm		at San Diego State	W 70–64	4–15 (3–5)	Viejas Arena (282); San Diego, CA
01/30/2016; 4:00 pm		Utah State	L 66–79	4–16 (3–6)	Lawlor Events Center (1,124); Reno, NV
02/06/2016; 4:00 pm		Colorado State	L 37–64	4–17 (3–7)	Lawlor Events Center (819); Reno, NV
02/10/2016; 6:00 pm		at Air Force	L 53–59	4–18 (3–8)	Clune Arena (131); Colorado Springs, CO
02/14/2016; 2:00 pm		at Fresno State	L 56–65	4–19 (3–9)	Save Mart Center (1,861); Fresno, CA
02/17/2016; 6:30 pm		San Jose State	L 63–76	4–20 (3–10)	Lawlor Events Center (905); Reno, NV
02/20/2016; 4:00 pm		UNLV	W 71–65	5–20 (4–10)	Lawlor Events Center (1,765); Reno, NV
02/24/2016; 6:00 pm		at Utah State	L 55–70	5–21 (4–11)	Smith Spectrum (549); Logan, UT
02/27/2016; 1:00 pm		at No. 25 Colorado State	L 56–74	5–22 (4–12)	Clune Arena (2,376); Fort Collins, CO
03/01/2016; 6:30 pm		Boise State	L 61–64 ^{OT}	5–23 (4–13)	Lawlor Events Center (1,063); Reno, NV
03/04/2015; 6:00 pm		at New Mexico	L 42–66	5–24 (4–14)	The Pit (5,492); Albuquerque, NM
Mountain West Women's Tournament
03/07/2016; 4:30 pm		vs. Utah State; First Round	L 35–59	5–25	Thomas & Mack Center; Paradise, NV
*Non-conference game. ^{#}Rankings from AP Poll. (#) Tournament seedings in parentheses. All times are in Pacific Time.

== See also ==
- 2015–16 Nevada Wolf Pack men's basketball team
