= 2015–16 San Diego State Aztecs women's basketball team =

Intercollegiate basketball season

2015–16 San Diego State Aztecs women's basketball
- Conference: Mountain West Conference
- Record: 12–19 (6–12 Mountain West)
- Head coach: Stacie Terry (3rd season)
- Assistant coaches: Jesse Clark; Ciara Carl; Nick Grant
- Home arena: Viejas Arena

2015–16 Mountain West Conference women's basketball standings
	Conf.				Overall
Team	W		L	PCT	W		L	PCT
No. 22 Colorado State †	18	–	0	1.000	31	–	2	.939
Fresno State	15	–	3	.833	22	–	12	.647
Boise State	12	–	6	.667	19	–	11	.633
San Jose State	11	–	7	.611	13	–	17	.433
UNLV	9	–	9	.500	18	–	14	.563
New Mexico	9	–	9	.500	17	–	15	.531
Utah State	8	–	10	.444	14	–	17	.452
Wyoming	6	–	12	.333	13	–	16	.448
San Diego State	6	–	12	.333	12	–	19	.387
Nevada	4	–	14	.222	5	–	25	.167
Air Force	1	–	17	.056	1	–	29	.033
† 2016 MWC tournament winner Rankings from AP poll

The 2015–16 San Diego State Aztecs women's basketball team represented San Diego State University in the 2015–16 college basketball season. The Aztecs, led by third year head coach Stacie Terry, played their home games at Viejas Arena and were members of the Mountain West Conference. They finished the season 12–19, 6–12 in Mountain West play to finish in a tie for eighth place. They advanced to the quarterfinals of the Mountain West women's tournament, where they lost to Colorado State.

== Roster ==
2015–16 San Diego State Aztecs women's basketball team
Players
Coaches

Pos.	#	Name	Height	Year	Previous school	Hometown
F	0	Deodra Smith	6 ft 2 in (1.88 m)	RS Sr	East HS; Boston College	Aurora, CO
G	3	Ariell Bostick	5 ft 4 in (1.63 m)	Jr	Bishop O' Dowd HS	Oakland, CA
G	4	Kymberly Ellison	5 ft 7 in (1.7 m)	RS Jr	Hardaway HS; Georgia Tech	Columbus, GA
G	11	Ahjalee Harvey	5 ft 6 in (1.68 m)	RS Sr	Eastside College Prep	Mountain View, CA
G	13	Allison Brown	5 ft 7 in (1.7 m)	So	Mater Dei HS	Anaheim Hills, CA
G	15	McKynzie Fort	5 ft 9 in (1.75 m)	So	Etiwanda HS	Fontana, CA
G	20	Geena Gomez	5 ft 8 in (1.73 m)	RS So	Edison HS; Saint Joseph's	Huntington Beach, CA
G/F	22	Lexy Thorderson	6 ft 0 in (1.83 m)	So	Rock Canyon HS	Castle Rock, CO
G	30	Cheyenne Greenhouse	5 ft 11 in (1.8 m)	So	Canyon Springs HS	Riverside, CA
F	32	Kylie Herd	6 ft 0 in (1.83 m)	Jr	Arcadia HS; Mesa CC	Phoenix, AZ
F	41	Arantxa Gomez	6 ft 0 in (1.83 m)	Fr	Parque Colegio Santa Ana HS	Valencia, Spain
F	44	Aleiah Brandon	6 ft 1 in (1.85 m)	RS Jr	Centennial HS	Corona, CA

Head coach

- Stacie Terry (UT Arlington)

Assistant coach(es)

- Jesse Clark (Pacific Union)
- Ciara Carl (Point Loma)
- Nick Grant (Baylor)

Legend

- (C) Team captain
- (S) Suspended
- (I) Ineligible
- (W) Walk-on
- Injured
- Current redshirt

Roster

== Schedule ==
Date time, TV	Rank^{#}	Opponent^{#}	Result	Record	Site (attendance) city, state
Exhibition
11/06/2015*; 6:30 pm		Point Loma Nazarene	W 76–61		Viejas Arena (548); San Diego, CA
Non-conference regular season
11/13/2015*; 7:00 pm		at Long Beach State	L 54–74	0–1	Walter Pyramid (873); Long Beach, CA
11/16/2015*; 6:30 pm		UC Riverside	L 68–85	0–2	Viejas Arena (310); San Diego, CA
11/19/2015*; 6:30 pm		UC Irvine	L 54–65	0–3	Viejas Arena (340); San Diego, CA
11/23/2015*; 7:00 pm		at Washington	L 51–80	0–4	Alaska Airlines Arena (504); Seattle, WA
11/27/2015*; 6:30 pm		North Dakota State; SDSU Thanksgiving Classic	W 64–54	1–4	Viejas Arena (255); San Diego, CA
11/29/2015*; 2:30 pm		Wisconsin; SDSU Thanksgiving Classic	W 63–57 ^{OT}	2–4	Viejas Arena (284); San Diego, CA
12/03/2015*; 6:30 pm		San Diego	L 53–60	2–5	Viejas Arena (370); San Diego, CA
12/07/2015*; 7:00 pm		at Cal State Northridge	W 67–65	3–5	Matadome (577); Northridge, CA
12/10/2015*; 12:00 pm		at Loyola Marymount	L 65–92	3–6	Gersten Pavilion (610); Los Angeles, CA
12/19/2015*; 2:00 pm		Cal State Fullerton	W 54–43	4–6	Viejas Arena (620); San Diego, CA
12/21/2015*; 6:30 pm		San Diego Christian	W 60–25	5–6	Viejas Arena (420); San Diego, CA
Mountain West regular season
12/30/2015; 6:00 pm		at Wyoming	W 84–77	6–6 (1–0)	Arena-Auditorium (2,312); Laramie, WY
01/02/2016; 6:30 pm		Utah State	L 36–55	6–7 (1–1)	Viejas Arena (404); San Diego, CA
01/06/2016; 7:00 pm		at San Jose State	L 73–78	6–8 (1–2)	Event Center Arena (325); San Jose, CA
01/13/2016; 6:30 pm		Colorado State	L 57–60	6–9 (1–3)	Viejas Arena (255); San Diego, CA
01/16/2016; 2:00 pm		Boise State	L 45–75	6–10 (1–4)	Viejas Arena (430); San Diego, CA
01/20/2016; 7:00 pm		at Fresno State	L 49–54	6–11 (1–5)	Save Mart Center (1,663); Fresno, CA
01/23/2016; 1:00 pm		at Utah State	L 59–72	6–12 (1–6)	Smith Spectrum (677); Logan, UT
01/27/2016; 6:30 pm		Nevada	L 64–70	6–13 (1–7)	Viejas Arena (282); San Diego, CA
01/30/2016; 2:00 pm		UNLV	L 41–55	6–14 (1–8)	Viejas Arena (2,400); San Diego, CA
02/03/2016; 6:00 pm		at Colorado State	L 54–70	6–15 (1–9)	Moby Arena (1,005); Fort Collins, CO
02/06/2016; 1:00 pm		at New Mexico	W 51–46	7–15 (2–9)	The Pit (5,356); Albuquerque, NM
02/10/2016; 6:30 pm		Fresno State	W 65–54 ^{2OT}	8–15 (3–9)	Viejas Arena (319); San Diego, CA
02/13/2016; 5:00 pm		at Air Force	W 69–66	9–15 (4–9)	Clune Arena (321); Colorado Springs, CO
02/20/2016; 2:00 pm		San Jose State	W 87–70	10–15 (5–9)	Viejas Arena (511); San Diego, CA
02/24/2016; 6:30 pm		Wyoming	W 53–40	11–15 (6–9)	Viejas Arena (286); San Diego, CA
02/27/2016; 1:00 pm		at Boise State	L 63–68	11–16 (6–10)	Taco Bell Arena (803); Boise, ID
03/01/2016; 6:30 pm		New Mexico	L 45–64	11–17 (6–11)	Viejas Arena (303); San Diego, CA
03/04/2016; 5:00 pm		at UNLV	L 51–62	11–18 (6–12)	Cox Pavilion (1,276); Paradise, NV
Mountain West Women's Tournament
03/07/2016; 2:00 pm		vs. Wyoming; First Round	W 62–44	12–18	Thomas & Mack Center; Paradise, NV
03/08/2016; 2:00 pm		vs. No. 22 Colorado State; Quarterfinals	L 41–53	12–19	Thomas & Mack Center; Paradise, NV
*Non-conference game. ^{#}Rankings from AP Poll. (#) Tournament seedings in parentheses. All times are in Pacific Time.

== See also ==
2015–16 San Diego State Aztecs men's basketball team
