= 2015–16 Air Force Falcons women's basketball team =

Intercollegiate basketball season

2015–16 Air Force Falcons women's basketball
- Conference: Mountain West Conference
- Record: 1–29 (1–17 Mountain West)
- Head coach: Chris Gobrecht (1st season)
- Assistant coaches: Stacy McIntyre; Erin Mills-Reid; Clare Fitzpatrick; Janean Jubic
- Home arena: Clune Arena

2015–16 Mountain West Conference women's basketball standings
	Conf.				Overall
Team	W		L	PCT	W		L	PCT
No. 22 Colorado State †	18	–	0	1.000	31	–	2	.939
Fresno State	15	–	3	.833	22	–	12	.647
Boise State	12	–	6	.667	19	–	11	.633
San Jose State	11	–	7	.611	13	–	17	.433
UNLV	9	–	9	.500	18	–	14	.563
New Mexico	9	–	9	.500	17	–	15	.531
Utah State	8	–	10	.444	14	–	17	.452
Wyoming	6	–	12	.333	13	–	16	.448
San Diego State	6	–	12	.333	12	–	19	.387
Nevada	4	–	14	.222	5	–	25	.167
Air Force	1	–	17	.056	1	–	29	.033
† 2016 MWC tournament winner Rankings from AP poll

The 2015–16 Air Force Falcons women's basketball team represented the United States Air Force Academy during the 2015–16 NCAA Division I women's basketball season. The Falcons, led by first head coach Chris Gobrecht, played their home games at the Clune Arena on the Air Force Academy's main campus in Colorado Springs, Colorado and were members of the Mountain West Conference. They finished the season 1–29, 1–17 in Mountain West play to finish in last place. They lost in the first round of the Mountain West women's tournament to UNLV.

== Roster ==
2015–16 Air Force Falcons women's basketball team
Players
Coaches

Pos.	#	Name	Height	Year	Previous school	Hometown
F	2	Myah Jackson	5 ft 9 in (1.75 m)	Jr	Potter's House Christian Academy	Jacksonville, FL
G	3	Rileymarie Clarke	5 ft 11 in (1.8 m)	Fr	Emerald Ridge	Puyallup, WA
G	4	Sydney Graham	5 ft 8 in (1.73 m)	Jr	Highland	Albuquerque, NM
G	5	Sarah Falvey	5 ft 6 in (1.68 m)	Jr	Fr. Gabriel Richard	Plymouth, MI
G	10	Venessannah Itugbu	5 ft 9 in (1.75 m)	Fr	Mesa Ridge	Colorado Springs, CO
G	11	Cortney Porter	5 ft 9 in (1.75 m)	So	Bonneville	Ogden, UT
F	12	Taylor Parker	6 ft 0 in (1.83 m)	Sr	Bozeman	Bozeman, MT
F	13	Sarah Fotsch	5 ft 11 in (1.8 m)	Jr	Brookfield Central	Brookfield, WI
G	14	Monica Mammah	5 ft 7 in (1.7 m)	Fr	Choctawhatchee	Fort Walton Beach, FL
F	20	Cheyenne Wall	6 ft 1 in (1.85 m)	Fr	North Carolina School of Science & Mathematics	Clayton, NC
G	21	Mary Cavanaugh	5 ft 8 in (1.73 m)	Jr	Heritage	Arvada, CO
G/F	23	Dee Bennett	6 ft 0 in (1.83 m)	So	Miami Norland Senior	Miami, FL
G	24	Sarah Cantu	5 ft 7 in (1.7 m)	So	Celina	Celina, TX
F	25	Erika Chapman	5 ft 10 in (1.78 m)	So	Byron P. Steele	Cibolo, TX
F	30	Christina Gamble	5 ft 9 in (1.75 m)	Sr	Columbia	Atlanta, GA
C	31	Maggie Borngesser	6 ft 1 in (1.85 m)	So	Bartram Trail	St. Augustine, FL
F	32	Darby Glaab	5 ft 11 in (1.8 m)	Fr	Talawanda	Hamilton, OH
F	40	Mikela Tucker	6 ft 2 in (1.88 m)	Fr	Mullen	Lakewood, CO

Head coach

- Chris Gobrecht (USC)

Assistant coach(es)

- Stacy McIntyre (Kentucky)
- Erin Mills-Reid (Fairleigh Dickinson)
- Clare Fitzpatrick (Cornell)
- Janean Jubic (Colorado–Colorado Springs)

Legend

- (C) Team captain
- (S) Suspended
- (I) Ineligible
- (W) Walk-on
- Injured
- Current redshirt

Roster

== Schedule and results ==
Date time, TV	Rank^{#}	Opponent^{#}	Result	Record	Site (attendance) city, state
Exhibition
11/06/2015*; 5:00 pm		Adams State	W 50–37		Clune Arena; Colorado Springs, CO
Non-conference regular season
11/13/2015*; 7:00 pm		at Gonzaga	L 35–88	0–1	McCarthey Athletic Center (5,574); Spokane, WA
11/15/2015*; 2:00 pm		at Eastern Washington	L 44–65	0–2	Reese Court (362); Cheney, WA
11/18/2015*; 7:00 pm		Denver	L 48–57	0–3	Clune Arena (208); Colorado Springs, CO
11/21/2015*; 3:00 pm		at Santa Clara	L 34–68	0–4	Leavey Center (300); Santa Clara, CA
11/23/2015*; 7:00 pm		at UC Davis	L 40–66	0–5	The Pavilion (276); Davis, CA
11/30/2015*; 7:00 pm, SECN		at Vanderbilt	L 29–86	0–6	Memorial Gymnasium (2,213); Nashville, TN
12/04/2015*; 4:30 pm		Eastern Michigan; Air Force Classic	L 59–72	0–7	Clune Arena (96); Colorado Springs, CO
12/05/2015*; 4:30 pm		Grand Canyon; Air Force Classic	L 39–73	0–8	Clune Arena (159); Colorado Springs, CO
12/12/2015*; 6:30 pm		at Southern Utah	L 56–75	0–9	Centrum Arena (465); Cedar City, UT
12/19/2015*; 11:00 am		at George Mason	L 52–69	0–10	Recreation & Athletic Complex (419); Fairfax, VA
12/21/2015*; 5:00 pm		at Navy	L 46–64	0–11	Alumni Hall (776); Annapolis, MD
Mountain West regular season
01/02/2016; 3:00 pm		at San Jose State	L 60–81	0–12 (0–1)	Event Center Arena (316); San Jose, CA
01/06/2016; 7:00 pm		Wyoming	L 45–67	0–13 (0–2)	Clune Arena (201); Colorado Springs, CO
01/09/2016; 5:00 pm		at Nevada	L 57–68	0–14 (0–3)	Lawlor Events Center (1,125); Reno, NV
01/13/2016; 7:00 pm		Utah State	L 53–66	0–15 (0–4)	Clune Arena (184); Colorado Springs, CO
01/16/2016; 6:00 pm		UNLV	L 56–60	0–16 (0–5)	Clune Arena (511); Colorado Springs, CO
01/20/2016; 7:00 pm		at Colorado State	L 47–71	0–17 (0–6)	Moby Arena (1,225); Fort Collins, CO
01/23/2016; 2:00 pm		at Fresno State	L 46–70	0–18 (0–7)	Save Mart Center (1,545); Fresno, CA
01/27/2016; 7:00 pm		New Mexico	L 33–63	0–19 (0–8)	Clune Arena (132); Colorado Springs, CO
01/30/2016; 6:00 pm		San Jose State	L 49–72	0–20 (0–9)	Clune Arena (427); Colorado Springs, CO
02/03/2016; 7:00 pm		at Wyoming	L 56–84	0–21 (0–10)	Arena-Auditorium (2,412); Laramie, WY
02/06/2016; 2:00 pm		at Boise State	L 48–61	0–22 (0–11)	Taco Bell Arena (773); Boise, ID
02/10/2016; 7:00 pm		Nevada	W 59–53	1–22 (1–11)	Clune Arena (131); Colorado Springs, CO
02/13/2016; 6:00 pm		San Diego State	L 66–69	1–23 (1–12)	Clune Arena (321); Colorado Springs, CO
02/17/2016; 8:00 pm		at UNLV	L 51–62	1–24 (1–13)	Cox Pavilion (801); Paradise, NV
02/20/2016; 2:00 pm		at New Mexico	L 36–58	1–25 (1–14)	The Pit (5,586); Albuquerque, NM
02/24/2016; 7:00 pm		Fresno State	L 48–63	1–26 (1–15)	Clune Arena (675); Colorado Springs, CO
03/01/2016; 7:00 pm		at Utah State	L 40–64	1–27 (1–16)	Smith Spectrum (440); Logan, UT
03/04/2016; 7:00 pm		No. 22 Colorado State	L 48–81	1–28 (1–17)	Clune Arena (717); Colorado Springs, CO
Mountain West Women's Tournament
03/07/2016; 8:00 pm		vs. UNLV; First Round	L 42–55	1–29	Thomas & Mack Center (1,648); Paradise, NV
*Non-conference game. ^{#}Rankings from AP Poll. (#) Tournament seedings in parentheses. All times are in Mountain Time.

== See also ==
- 2015–16 Air Force Falcons men's basketball team
