= 2016 Mountain West Conference women's basketball tournament =

- Classification: Division I
- Season: 2015–16
- Teams: 11
- Site: Thomas & Mack Center; Paradise, NV
- Champions: Colorado State (3rd title)
- Winning coach: Ryun Williams (1st title)
- MVP: Elin Gustavsson (Colorado State)
- Attendance: 8,420
- Television: MWN

2015–16 Mountain West Conference women's basketball standings
	Conf.				Overall
Team	W		L	PCT	W		L	PCT
No. 22 Colorado State †	18	–	0	1.000	31	–	2	.939
Fresno State	15	–	3	.833	22	–	12	.647
Boise State	12	–	6	.667	19	–	11	.633
San Jose State	11	–	7	.611	13	–	17	.433
UNLV	9	–	9	.500	18	–	14	.563
New Mexico	9	–	9	.500	17	–	15	.531
Utah State	8	–	10	.444	14	–	17	.452
Wyoming	6	–	12	.333	13	–	16	.448
San Diego State	6	–	12	.333	12	–	19	.387
Nevada	4	–	14	.222	5	–	25	.167
Air Force	1	–	17	.056	1	–	29	.033
† 2016 MWC tournament winner Rankings from AP poll

The 2016 Mountain West Conference women's basketball tournament was a postseason women's which was held on March 7–11, 2016 at the Thomas & Mack Center in Las Vegas, Nevada. Colorado State defeated Fresno State to win their 2nd Mountain West title, 3rd overall for the first time since 2001 and earn an automatic bid to the NCAA women's tournament.

== Seeds ==
Teams are seeded by conference record, with a ties broken by record between the tied teams followed by record against the regular-season champion, if necessary.

Seed	School	Conf (Overall)	Tiebreaker
#1	Colorado State	18–0 (28–1)	
#2	Fresno State	15–3 (19–10)	
#3	Boise State	12–6 (19–10)	
#4	San Jose State	11–7 (13–16)	
#5	New Mexico	9–9 (16–13)	1–1 vs. UNLV
#6	UNLV	9–9 (16–13)	1–1 vs. UNM
#7	Utah State	8–10 (13–16)	
#8	San Diego State	6–12 (11–18)	2–0 vs. WYO
#9	Wyoming	6–12 (13–15)	0–2 vs. SDSU
#10	Nevada	4–14 (5–24)	
#11	Air Force	1–17 (1–28)	

== Schedule ==
Game	Time*	Matchup^{#}	Television	TV Announcers	MW Radio Announcers
First round – Monday, March 7
1	2:00 pm	#8 San Diego State vs. #9 Wyoming	MWN	Rich Cellini & Krista Blunk	Nate Kreckman & Robert Smith
2	4:30 pm	#7 Utah State vs. #10 Nevada	MWN	Rich Cellini & Krista Blunk	Brett Grant & Robert Smith
3	7:00 pm	#6 UNLV vs. #11 Air Force	MWN	Rich Cellini & Krista Blunk	Mitch Moss & Marty Fletcher
Quarterfinals – Tuesday, March 8
4	Noon	#1 Colorado State vs. #8 San Diego State	MWN	Rich Cellini & Krista Blunk	
5	2:30 pm	#4 San Jose State vs. #5 New Mexico	MWN	Rich Cellini & Krista Blunk	
6	6:00 pm	#2 Fresno State vs. #7 Utah State	MWN	Rich Cellini & Krista Blunk	
7	8:30 pm	#3 Boise State vs. #6 UNLV	MWN	Rich Cellini & Krista Blunk	
Semifinals – Wednesday, March 9
8	6:30 pm	#1 Colorado State vs. #5 New Mexico	MWN	Rich Cellini & Krista Blunk	
9	9:00 pm	#2 Fresno State vs. #6 UNLV	MWN	Rich Cellini & Krista Blunk	
Championship – Friday, March 11
10	Noon	#1 Colorado State vs. #2 Fresno State	MWN	Rich Cellini & Krista Blunk	
*Game Times in PT. #-Rankings denote tournament seeding.

== Bracket ==
The tournament took place March 7–11.

First round Monday, March 7 MWN
8	San Diego State	62
9	Wyoming	44
7	Utah State	59
10	Nevada	35
6	UNLV	55
11	Air Force	42

Quarterfinals; Tuesday, March 8 MWN
1	Colorado State	53
8	San Diego State	41
4	San Jose State	51
5	New Mexico	65
2	Fresno State	55
7	Utah State	47
3	Boise State	65
6	UNLV	71

Semifinals; Wednesday, March 9 MWN
1	Colorado State	60
5	New Mexico	42
2	Fresno State	66
6	UNLV	60

Championship; Friday, March 11; MWN
1	Colorado State	55
2	Fresno State	54
