= 2015–16 Utah State Aggies women's basketball team =

Intercollegiate basketball season

2015–16 Utah State Aggies women's basketball
- Conference: Mountain West Conference
- Record: 14–17 (8–10 Mountain West)
- Head coach: Jerry Finkbeiner (4th season)
- Assistant coaches: Ben Finkbeiner; JC Carter; Micha Thompson
- Home arena: Smith Spectrum

2015–16 Mountain West Conference women's basketball standings
	Conf.				Overall
Team	W		L	PCT	W		L	PCT
No. 22 Colorado State †	18	–	0	1.000	31	–	2	.939
Fresno State	15	–	3	.833	22	–	12	.647
Boise State	12	–	6	.667	19	–	11	.633
San Jose State	11	–	7	.611	13	–	17	.433
UNLV	9	–	9	.500	18	–	14	.563
New Mexico	9	–	9	.500	17	–	15	.531
Utah State	8	–	10	.444	14	–	17	.452
Wyoming	6	–	12	.333	13	–	16	.448
San Diego State	6	–	12	.333	12	–	19	.387
Nevada	4	–	14	.222	5	–	25	.167
Air Force	1	–	17	.056	1	–	29	.033
† 2016 MWC tournament winner Rankings from AP poll

The 2015–16 Utah State Aggies women's basketball team represented Utah State University in the 2015–16 college basketball season. The Aggies, led by fourth year head coach Jerry Finkbeiner, played their home games at the Smith Spectrum and were third year members of the Mountain West Conference. They finished the season 14–17, 8–10 in Mountain West play to finish in seventh place. They lost in the quarterfinals of the Mountain West women's tournament to Fresno State.

== Roster ==
2015–16 Utah State Aggies women's basketball team
Players
Coaches

Pos.	#	Name	Height	Year	Previous school	Hometown
G	1	Victoria Price	5 ft 8 in (1.73 m)	Fr	Grand Prairie	Grand Prairie, TX
G/F	3	Funda Nakkaşoğlu	5 ft 7 in (1.7 m)	So	St. Leonard's	Hampton, Australia
G/F	10	Julianne Anchling	6 ft 3 in (1.91 m)	Sr	Notre Dame des Victoires; Trinity Valley CC	Faverges de la Tour, France
G	11	Lindsey Jensen	5 ft 9 in (1.75 m)	Fr	Sky View	Smithfield, UT
C	15	Hannah Hutchins	6 ft 4 in (1.93 m)	So	Ledyard HS	Ledyard, CT
G	20	Mariah Miles	5 ft 7 in (1.7 m)	Sr	Calumet HS; Oral Roberts	Geary, OK
F	21	Angelica de Paulo	6 ft 2 in (1.88 m)	Jr	Escola Estadual Doutor Jose Fornari; New Mexico JC	São Paulo, Brazil
F	22	Tijana Djukic	6 ft 4 in (1.93 m)	Sr	Gymnasium J.J. Zmaj; Miami Dade College	Kikinda, Serbia
F	23	Baylee Peck	5 ft 7 in (1.7 m)	So	Rouse HS	Leander, TX
G	25	Rachel Brewster	5 ft 11 in (1.8 m)	Fr	Rowville Secondary College	Melbourne, Australia
G	31	Katie Toole	5 ft 10 in (1.78 m)	Fr	Viewmont HS	Bountiful, UT
G	32	Taylor Enders	5 ft 10 in (1.78 m)	Fr	West Linn HS	West Linn, OR
G	33	Lizzy Klinker	5 ft 10 in (1.78 m)	Fr	Fairfield HS	Fairfield, MT
F	41	Antonia Robinson	6 ft 2 in (1.88 m)	Jr	Duncanville HS; New Mexico JC	Dallas, TX
C	44	Deja Mason	6 ft 4 in (1.93 m)	Fr	Brennan HS	San Antonio, TX

Head coach

- Jerry Finkbeiner (Southern Nazarene)

Assistant coach(es)

- Ben Finkbeiner (Oral Roberts)
- JC Carter (Southwest Baptist)
- Micha Thompson (Pensacola Christian)

Legend

- (C) Team captain
- (S) Suspended
- (I) Ineligible
- (W) Walk-on
- Injured
- Current redshirt

Roster

== Schedule ==
Date time, TV	Rank^{#}	Opponent^{#}	Result	Record	Site (attendance) city, state
Exhibition
10/31/2015*; 2:00 pm		South Dakota School of Mines	W 74–63		Smith Spectrum (388); Logan, UT
11/07/2015*; 2:00 pm		Dixie State	W 109–76		Smith Spectrum (380); Logan, UT
Non-conference regular season
11/14/2015*; 2:00 pm		Sacramento State	L 86–95	0–1	Smith Spectrum (320); Logan, UT
11/16/2015*; 7:00 pm		Westminster	W 74–67	1–1	Smith Spectrum (428); Logan, UT
11/21/2015*; 6:00 pm		Pacific	W 78–70	2–1	Smith Spectrum (477); Logan, UT
11/24/2015*; 11:00 am, BYUtv		at BYU	L 69–81	2–2	Marriott Center (2,808); Provo, UT
12/01/2015*; 7:00 pm		at Northern Colorado	L 60–74	2–3	Bank of Colorado Arena (567); Greeley, CO
12/04/2015*; 7:00 pm		Haskell Indian Nations	W 90–63	3–3	Smith Spectrum (572); Logan, UT
12/08/2015*; 7:00 pm		at Idaho State	L 67–81	3–4	Reed Gym (924); Pocatello, ID
12/10/2015*; 7:00 pm		at Utah Valley	W 76–72	4–4	PE Building (323); Orem, UT
12/19/2015*; 1:00 pm		vs. Tennessee State; Lady Griz Classic semifinals	W 63–46	5–4	Dahlberg Arena (320); Missoula, MT
12/20/2015*; 3:30 pm		at Montana; Lady Griz Classic championship	L 70–86	5–5	Dahlberg Arena (2,404); Missoula, MT
12/22/2015*; 1:00 pm		Utah	L 61–64	5–6	Smith Spectrum (354); Logan, UT
Mountain West regular season
12/30/2015; 7:00 pm		San Jose State	L 74–86	5–7 (0–1)	Smith Spectrum (266); Logan, UT
01/02/2016; 3:00 pm		at San Diego State	W 55–36	6–7 (1–1)	Viejas Arena (404); San Diego, CA
01/06/2016; 7:00 pm		at Boise State	L 78–84 ^{OT}	6–8 (1–2)	Taco Bell Arena (683); Boise, ID
01/09/2016; 2:00 pm		New Mexico	W 72–56	7–8 (2–2)	Smith Spectrum (359); Logan, UT
01/13/2016; 7:00 pm		at Air Force	W 66–53	8–8 (3–2)	Clune Arena (184); Colorado Springs, CO
01/16/2016; 2:00 pm		Colorado State	L 49–69	8–9 (3–3)	Smith Spectrum (577); Logan, UT
01/20/2016; 8:00 pm		at UNLV	L 38–46	8–10 (3–4)	Cox Pavilion (1,342); Paradise, NV
01/23/2016; 2:00 pm		San Diego State	W 72–59	9–10 (4–4)	Smith Spectrum (677); Logan, UT
01/30/2016; 5:00 pm		at Nevada	W 79–66	10–10 (5–4)	Lawlor Events Center (1,124); Reno, NV
02/03/2016; 7:00 pm		Boise State	L 58–63	10–11 (5–5)	Smith Spectrum (657); Logan, UT
02/06/2016; 2:00 pm		Wyoming	W 84–76	11–11 (6–5)	Smith Spectrum (696); Logan, UT
02/10/2016; 7:00 pm		at New Mexico	L 70–73	11–12 (6–6)	The Pit (5,108); Albuquerque, NM
02/17/2016; 7:00 pm		at Colorado State	L 64–91	11–13 (6–7)	Moby Arena (1,505); Fort Collins, CO
02/20/2016; 2:00 pm		Fresno State	L 61–67	11–14 (6–8)	Smith Spectrum (560); Logan, UT
02/24/2016; 7:00 pm		Nevada	W 70–55	12–14 (7–8)	Smith Spectrum (549); Logan, UT
02/27/2016; 3:00 pm		at San Jose State	L 65–83	12–15 (7–9)	Event Center Arena (486); San Jose, CA
03/01/2016; 7:00 pm		Air Force	W 64–40	13–15 (8–9)	Smith Spectrum (440); Logan, UT
03/04/2016; 8:00 pm		at Fresno State	L 62–66	13–16 (8–10)	Save Mart Center (1,577); Fresno, CA
Mountain West Women's Tournament
03/07/2016; 5:30 pm		vs. Nevada; First Round	W 59–35	14–16	Thomas & Mack Center; Paradise, NV
03/08/2016; 7:00 pm		vs. Fresno State; Quarterfinals	L 47–55	14–17	Thomas & Mack Center; Paradise, NV
*Non-conference game. ^{#}Rankings from AP Poll. (#) Tournament seedings in parentheses. All times are in Mountain Time.

== See also ==
- 2015–16 Utah State Aggies men's basketball team
