= 2015–16 Boise State Broncos women's basketball team =

American college basketball season

2015–16 Boise State Broncos women's basketball
- Conference: Mountain West Conference
- Record: 19–11 (12–6 MWC)
- Head coach: Gordy Presnell (11th season)
- Assistant coaches: Sunny Smallwood; Cody Butler; Heather Sower
- Home arena: Taco Bell Arena

2015–16 Mountain West Conference women's basketball standings
	Conf.				Overall
Team	W		L	PCT	W		L	PCT
No. 22 Colorado State †	18	–	0	1.000	31	–	2	.939
Fresno State	15	–	3	.833	22	–	12	.647
Boise State	12	–	6	.667	19	–	11	.633
San Jose State	11	–	7	.611	13	–	17	.433
UNLV	9	–	9	.500	18	–	14	.563
New Mexico	9	–	9	.500	17	–	15	.531
Utah State	8	–	10	.444	14	–	17	.452
Wyoming	6	–	12	.333	13	–	16	.448
San Diego State	6	–	12	.333	12	–	19	.387
Nevada	4	–	14	.222	5	–	25	.167
Air Force	1	–	17	.056	1	–	29	.033
† 2016 MWC tournament winner Rankings from AP poll

The 2015–16 Boise State Broncos women's basketball team represented Boise State University during the 2015–16 NCAA Division I women's basketball season. The Broncos, led by 11th-year head coach Gordy Presnell, played their home games at Taco Bell Arena and were a member of the Mountain West Conference. They finished the season 19–11, 12–6 in Mountain West play to finish in third place. They lost in the quarterfinals of the Mountain West women's tournament to UNLV. Despite having 19 wins, they were not invited to a postseason tournament.

== Roster ==
2015–16 Boise State Broncos women's basketball team
Players
Coaches

Pos.	#	Name	Height	Year	Previous school	Hometown
F	2	Shalem Shaw	6 ft 1 in (1.85 m)	So	Reno HS	Reno, NV
G	3	Tonishia Childress	5 ft 5 in (1.65 m)	Jr	Bishop Gorman HS	Las Vegas, NV
G	10	Yaiza Rodriguez Ortego	5 ft 5 in (1.65 m)	Jr	XXXX	Esplugues de Llobregat, Spain
F	14	Julia Dufurrena	5 ft 11 in (1.8 m)	Sr	College of Southern Idaho; Lowry HS	Winnemucca, NV
F	15	Lexie Der	6 ft 1 in (1.85 m)	RS Sr	St. Thomas More HS	Burnaby, BC
G	20	Marta Hermida	5 ft 11 in (1.8 m)	Fr	XXXX	Madrid, Spain
C	31	Marijke Vanderschaaf	6 ft 3 in (1.91 m)	RS Fr	Eastlake HS	Sammamish, WA
C	32	Miquelle Askew	6 ft 3 in (1.91 m)	Sr	Skyline HS	South Jordan, UT
F	33	Joyce Harrell	6 ft 0 in (1.83 m)	Fr	Cleveland HS	Seattle, WA
G	40	Brittney Pahukoa	5 ft 7 in (1.7 m)	Jr	Lake Stevens HS	Lake Stevens, WA
G	42	Ella Fotu	5 ft 10 in (1.78 m)	Fr	Rangitoto College	Auckland, New Zealand
G	44	Brooke Pahukoa	5 ft 9 in (1.75 m)	Jr	Lake Stevens HS	Lake Stevens, WA
F	54	Jordan Tully	6 ft 2 in (1.88 m)	Fr	Oak Park HS	Winnipeg, MB

Head coach

- Gordy Presnell (Northwest Nazarene)

Assistant coach(es)

- Sunny Smallwood (Boise State)
- Cody Butler (Nevada)
- Heather Sower (Boise State)

Legend

- (C) Team captain
- (S) Suspended
- (I) Ineligible
- (W) Walk-on
- Injured
- Current redshirt

Roster

== Schedule ==
Date time, TV	Opponent	Result	Record	Site (attendance) city, state
Exhibition
11/06/2014*; 7:00 pm	Southern Oregon	W 102–50		Taco Bell Arena; Boise, ID
Non-conference regular season
11/13/2015*; 7:00 pm	Cal State Los Angeles	W 58–44	1–0	Bronco Gym (624); Boise, ID
11/16/2015*; 4:00 pm	College of Charleston	W 61–38	2–0	Taco Bell Arena; Boise, ID
11/19/2015*; 7:00 pm	Utah Valley	L 70–72	2–1	Taco Bell Arena (504); Boise, ID
11/27/2015*; 5:00 pm	vs. Auburn; San Juan Shootout	L 53–55	2–2	Mario Morales Coliseum (116); Guaynabo, PR
11/28/2015*; 2:45 pm	vs. Stetson; San Juan Shootout	W 71–65	3–2	Mario Morales Coliseum; Guaynabo, PR
12/03/2015*; 7:00 pm	Washington State	L 52–57	3–3	Taco Bell Arena (863); Boise, ID
12/06/2015*; 2:00 pm, CSNNW	at Portland	W 89–49	4–3	Chiles Center (349); Portland, OR
12/11/2015*; 7:00 pm	Idaho State	L 77–80	4–4	Taco Bell Arena (498); Boise, ID
12/13/2015*; 2:00 pm	Concordia (OR)	W 84–77	5–4	Taco Bell Arena (546); Boise, ID
12/19/2015*; 3:00 pm	at Seattle	W 84–66	6–4	Connolly Center (391); Seattle, WA
12/21/2015*; 7:00 pm	at Eastern Washington	W 84–79	7–4	Reese Court (165); Cheney, WA
Mountain West regular season
01/02/2016; 2:00 pm	at Colorado State	L 64–68	7–5 (0–1)	Moby Arena (1,776); Fort Collins, CO
01/06/2016; 7:00 pm	Utah State	W 84–78 ^{OT}	8–5 (1–1)	Taco Bell Arena (683); Boise, ID
01/09/2016; 3:00 pm	at Fresno State	L 57–62	8–6 (1–2)	Save Mart Center (1,663); Fresno, CA
01/13/2016; 7:00 pm	Nevada	W 66–58	9–6 (2–2)	Taco Bell Arena (775); Boise, ID
01/16/2016; 3:00 pm	at San Diego State	W 75–45	10–6 (3–2)	Viejas Arena (430); San Diego, CA
01/20/2016; 8:00 pm	at San Jose State	W 78–75	11–6 (4–2)	Event Center Arena (324); San Jose, CA
01/23/2016; 2:00 pm	Wyoming	W 58–49	12–6 (5–2)	Taco Bell Arena (823); Boise, ID
01/27/2016; 7:00 pm	UNLV	W 75–56	13–6 (6–2)	Taco Bell Arena (807); Boise, ID
01/30/2016; 2:00 pm	at New Mexico	W 81–60	14–6 (7–2)	The Pit (5,517); Albuquerque, NM
02/03/2016; 7:00 pm	at Utah State	W 63–58	15–6 (8–2)	Smith Spectrum (657); Logan, UT
02/06/2016; 2:00 pm	Air Force	W 61–48	16–6 (9–2)	Taco Bell Arena (773); Boise, ID
02/10/2016; 7:00 pm	Colorado State	L 51–83	16–7 (9–3)	Taco Bell Arena (1,545); Boise, ID
02/13/2016; 2:00 pm	at Wyoming	L 58–82	16–8 (9–4)	Arena-Auditorium (3,012); Laramie, WY
02/17/2016; 7:00 pm	New Mexico	L 60–70	16–9 (9–5)	Taco Bell Arena (658); Boise, ID
02/24/2016; 8:00 pm	at UNLV	L 68–78	16–10 (9–6)	Cox Pavilion (1,174); Paradise, NV
02/27/2016; 2:00 pm	San Diego State	W 68–63	17–10 (10–6)	Taco Bell Arena (803); Boise, ID
03/01/2016; 7:30 pm	at Nevada	W 64–61 ^{OT}	18–10 (11–6)	Lawlor Events Center (1,063); Reno, NV
03/04/2016; 7:00 pm	San Jose State	W 81–69	19–10 (12–6)	Taco Bell Arena (1,006); Boise, ID
Mountain West Women's Tournament
03/08/2016; 7:00 pm	vs. UNLV; Quarterfinals	L 65–71	19–11	Thomas & Mack Center (1,393); Paradise, NV
*Non-conference game. ^{#}Rankings from AP Poll. (#) Tournament seedings in parentheses. All times are in Mountain Time.

== See also ==
- 2015–16 Boise State Broncos men's basketball team
