= 2015–16 Wyoming Cowgirls basketball team =

Intercollegiate basketball season

2015–16 Wyoming Cowgirls basketball
- Conference: Mountain West Conference
- Record: 13–16 (6–12 Mountain West)
- Head coach: Joe Legerski (13th season)
- Assistant coaches: Gerald Mattinson; Bojan Janković; Heather Ezell
- Home arena: Arena-Auditorium

2015–16 Mountain West Conference women's basketball standings
	Conf.				Overall
Team	W		L	PCT	W		L	PCT
No. 22 Colorado State †	18	–	0	1.000	31	–	2	.939
Fresno State	15	–	3	.833	22	–	12	.647
Boise State	12	–	6	.667	19	–	11	.633
San Jose State	11	–	7	.611	13	–	17	.433
UNLV	9	–	9	.500	18	–	14	.563
New Mexico	9	–	9	.500	17	–	15	.531
Utah State	8	–	10	.444	14	–	17	.452
Wyoming	6	–	12	.333	13	–	16	.448
San Diego State	6	–	12	.333	12	–	19	.387
Nevada	4	–	14	.222	5	–	25	.167
Air Force	1	–	17	.056	1	–	29	.033
† 2016 MWC tournament winner Rankings from AP poll

The 2015–16 Wyoming Cowgirls basketball team represented the University of Wyoming in the 2015–16 college basketball season. The Cowgirls were led by thirteenth year head coach Joe Legerski. The Cowgirls played their home games at the Arena-Auditorium and were members of the Mountain West Conference. They finished the season 13–16, 6–12 in Mountain West play to finish in a tie for eighth place. They lost in the first round of the Mountain West women's tournament to San Diego State.

== Roster ==
2015–16 Wyoming Cowgirls women's basketball team
Players
Coaches

Pos.	#	Name	Height	Year	Previous school	Hometown
G	3	Daley Handy	6 ft 0 in (1.83 m)	Fr	Maize HS	Wichita, Kansas
G	5	Riikka Kujala	5 ft 5 in (1.65 m)	Fr	Vimpelin Lukio High School	Vimpeli, Finland
G	10	Marquelle Dent	5 ft 7 in (1.7 m)	Sr	Regis Jesuit HS	Denver, Colorado
F	12	Marta Gomez	6 ft 1 in (1.85 m)	Fr	INS Joaquim Blume High School	Valles, Spain
G	13	Liv Roberts	5 ft 11 in (1.8 m)	So	Sentinel HS	Missoula, Montana
F	14	Natalie Baker	6 ft 0 in (1.83 m)	So	Chaparral HS	Parker, Colorado
G	22	Jordan Kelly	6 ft 0 in (1.83 m)	RS Sr	Washington State; Campbell County HS	Gillette, Wyoming
F	23	Bailee Cotton	6 ft 2 in (1.88 m)	So	Denver School S&T	Denver, Colorado
G	24	Skylar Snodgrass	5 ft 10 in (1.78 m)	So	Andover Central HS	Wichita, Kansas
F	32	Tijana Raca	6 ft 0 in (1.83 m)	Fr	Aristoteleio College	Pylea Thessaloniki, Greece
G	33	Hailey Ligocki	5 ft 8 in (1.73 m)	Jr	Sheridan HS	Sherdian, Wyoming
F	40	Coreen Labish	6 ft 2 in (1.88 m)	Fr	Mead HS	Cheney, Washington
F	42	Marleah Campbell	6 ft 2 in (1.88 m)	So	Shawnee Mission West HS	Lenexa, Kansas
F	44	Rachelle Tucker	6 ft 2 in (1.88 m)	Fr	Pierce HS	Pierce, Nebraska

Head coach

- Joe Legerski (Wyoming)

Assistant coach(es)

- Gerald Mattinson (Weber State)
- Bojan Janković (Ozarks)
- Heather Ezell (Iowa State)

Legend

- (C) Team captain
- (S) Suspended
- (I) Ineligible
- (W) Walk-on
- Injured
- Current redshirt

Roster

== Statistics ==
Player	GP	GS	MPG	FG%	3FG%	FT%	RPG	APG	SPG	BPG	PPG
Natalie Baker	29	20	25.0	.382	.304	.787	5.9	0.7	0.8	0.6	8.8
Marleah Campbell	29	1	11.2	.347	.326	.720	1.6	0.3	0.2	0.6	2.9
Bailee Cotton	8	8	23.9	.406	–	.600	5.1	0.4	1.3	0.1	5.9
Marquelle Dent	29	29	36.7	.367	.255	.677	3.2	5.6	2.0	0.3	15.5
Marta Gomez	29	29	32.7	.439	.402	.846	4.7	0.9	0.7	0.2	10.7
Jordan Kelley	11	11	36.1	.472	.125	.909	9.3	3.3	0.7	0.1	10.5
Riikka Kujala	23	1	7.2	.133	.333	.800	0.5	0.9	0.0	0.0	0.6
Coreen Labish	4	0	3.8	.000	–	.250	0.8	0.0	0.0	0.0	0.3
Hailey Ligocki	27	17	21.1	.418	.278	.769	2.2	1.4	0.6	0.0	4.3
Tijana Raca	14	0	6.3	.273	.235	1.000	0.7	0.2	0.1	0.0	1.3
Liv Roberts	29	29	33.4	.449	.228	.781	5.8	1.2	0.9	0.2	10.1
Skyler Snodgrass	25	0	10.8	.293	.321	.429	1.2	0.2	0.4	0.0	3.0
Rachelle Tucker	22	0	6.5	.515	–	.688	1.7	0.0	0.1	0.1	2.5

== Schedule ==
Date time, TV	Rank^{#}	Opponent^{#}	Result	Record	Site (attendance) city, state
Exhibition
11/05/2015*; 7:00 pm		Adams State	W 90–41		Arena-Auditorium (2,238); Laramie, Wyoming
Non-conference regular season
11/17/2015*; 4:00 pm		Chadron State	W 81–53	1–0	Arena-Auditorium (2,419); Laramie, Wyoming
11/20/2015*; 7:00 pm		Saint Mary's	L 64–70	1–1	Arena-Auditorium (2,423); Laramie, Wyoming
11/24/2015*; 8:00 pm		at Cal State Fullerton	W 61–56 ^{OT}	2–1	Titan Gym (136); Fullerton, California
11/27/2015*; 7:00 pm		UC Santa Barbara	W 76–67	3–1	Arena-Auditorium (2,712); Laramie, Wyoming
12/03/2015*; 7:00 pm		at Gonzaga	L 57–61 ^{OT}	3–2	McCarthey Athletic Center (5,212); Spokane, Washington
12/05/2015*; 3:00 pm		at Idaho	L 57–61	3–3	Cowan Spectrum (315); Moscow, Idaho
12/09/2015*; 12:00 pm, RTRM		at Denver	W 75–64	4–3	Magness Arena (1,795); Denver, Colorado
12/12/2015*; 2:00 pm		Montana	W 68–61	5–3	Arena-Auditorium (2,440); Laramie, Wyoming
12/19/2015*; 5:00 pm		Montana State	W 75–69 ^{OT}	6–3	Arena-Auditorium (2,521); Laramie, Wyoming
12/21/2015*; 7:00 pm		Colorado	W 77–68	7–3	Arena-Auditorium (2,539); Laramie, Wyoming
Mountain West regular season
12/30/2015; 7:00 pm		San Diego State	L 77–84	7–4 (0–1)	Arena-Auditorium (2,312); Laramie, Wyoming
01/02/2016; 2:00 pm		Nevada	W 68–53	8–4 (1–1)	Arena-Auditorium (2,989); Laramie, Wyoming
01/06/2016; 7:00 pm		at Air Force	W 67–45	9–4 (2–1)	Clune Arena (201); Colorado Springs, Colorado
01/09/2016; 8:00 pm		at UNLV	L 37–66	9–5 (2–2)	Cox Pavilion (1,703); Paradise, Nevada
01/13/2016; 7:00 pm		San Jose State	L 66–67	9–6 (2–3)	Arena-Auditorium (2,523); Laramie, Wyoming
01/16/2016; 2:00 pm		New Mexico	W 66–48	10–6 (3–3)	Arena-Auditorium (2,509); Laramie, Wyoming
01/20/2016; 7:30 pm		at Nevada	L 65–68	10–7 (3–4)	Lawlor Events Center (917); Reno, Nevada
01/23/2016; 2:00 pm		at Boise State	L 49–58	10–8 (3–5)	Taco Bell Arena (823); Boise, Idaho
01/27/2016; 7:00 pm		Fresno State	L 42–49	10–9 (3–6)	Arena-Auditorium (2,568); Laramie, Wyoming
01/30/2016; 2:00 pm		at Colorado State; Border War	L 42–63	10–10 (3–7)	Moby Arena (2,837); Fort Collins, Colorado
02/03/2016; 7:00 pm		Air Force	W 84–56	11–10 (4–7)	Arena-Auditorium (2,412); Laramie, Wyoming
02/06/2016; 2:00 pm		at Utah State	L 75–84	11–11 (4–8)	Smith Spectrum (696); Logan, Utah
02/13/2016; 2:00 pm		Boise State	W 82–58	12–11 (5–8)	Arena-Auditorium (3,012); Laramie, Wyoming
02/17/2016; 8:00 pm		at Fresno State	L 52–64	12–12 (5–9)	Save Mart Center (1,496); Fresno, California
02/20/2016; 2:00 pm		Colorado State; Border War	L 57–62	12–13 (5–10)	Arena-Auditorium (3,269); Laramie, Wyoming
02/24/2016; 7:30 pm		at San Diego State	L 40–53	12–14 (5–11)	Viejas Arena (286); San Diego, California
02/27/2016; 2:00 pm		UNLV	W 80–57	13–14 (6–11)	Arena-Auditorium (3,137); Laramie, Wyoming
03/01/2016; 8:00 pm		at San Jose State	L 51–65	13–15 (6–12)	Event Center Arena (1,183); San Jose, California
Mountain West Women's Tournament
03/07/2016; 3:00 pm	(9)	vs. (8) San Diego State; First Round	L 44–62	13–16	Thomas & Mack Center; Paradise, Nevada
*Non-conference game. ^{#}Rankings from AP Poll. (#) Tournament seedings in parentheses. All times are in Mountain Time. All dates, times and TV are tentative and subject to change.

== See also ==
- 2015–16 Wyoming Cowboys basketball team
