= 2015–16 New Mexico Lobos women's basketball team =

Intercollegiate basketball season

2015–16 New Mexico Lobos women's basketball

WBI, First Round
- Conference: Mountain West Conference
- Record: 17–15 (9–9 Mountain West)
- Head coach: Yvonne Sanchez (5th season)
- Assistant coaches: Joseph Anders; Amy Beggi; Anthony Turner
- Home arena: The Pit; Johnson Gymnasium

2015–16 Mountain West Conference women's basketball standings
	Conf.				Overall
Team	W		L	PCT	W		L	PCT
No. 22 Colorado State †	18	–	0	1.000	31	–	2	.939
Fresno State	15	–	3	.833	22	–	12	.647
Boise State	12	–	6	.667	19	–	11	.633
San Jose State	11	–	7	.611	13	–	17	.433
UNLV	9	–	9	.500	18	–	14	.563
New Mexico	9	–	9	.500	17	–	15	.531
Utah State	8	–	10	.444	14	–	17	.452
Wyoming	6	–	12	.333	13	–	16	.448
San Diego State	6	–	12	.333	12	–	19	.387
Nevada	4	–	14	.222	5	–	25	.167
Air Force	1	–	17	.056	1	–	29	.033
† 2016 MWC tournament winner Rankings from AP poll

The 2015–16 New Mexico Lobos women's basketball team represented the University of New Mexico during the 2015–16 NCAA Division I women's basketball season. The Lobos, led by fifth-year head coach Yvonne Sanchez, played their home games at The Pit with one game at Johnson Gymnasium and were members of the Mountain West Conference. They finished the season 17–15, 9–9 in Mountain West play to finish in a tie for fifth place. They advanced to the semifinals of the Mountain West women's tournament, where they lost to Colorado State. They were invited to the Women's Basketball Invitational, where they lost to North Dakota in the first round.

On March 18, the school fired Yvonne Sanchez. She finished at New Mexico with a five-year record of 77–81.

== Roster ==
2015–16 New Mexico Lobos women's basketball team
Players
Coaches

Pos.	#	Name	Height	Year	Previous school	Hometown
G	0	Cherise Beynon	5 ft 10 in (1.78 m)	So	Canyon Springs HS	Las Vegas, NV
G	2	Kenya Pye	5 ft 8 in (1.73 m)	So	Maclay Prep	Tallahassee, FL
F	3	Josie Greenwood	5 ft 11 in (1.8 m)	Jr	Rosny College	Hobart, Australia
G	4	Alex Lapeyrolerie	5 ft 11 in (1.8 m)	Jr	Edward S. Marcus HS	Highland Village, TX
F	11	Alexa Chavez (W)	6 ft 0 in (1.83 m)	Sr	St. Michael's HS	Santa Fe, NM
G	12	Bryce Owens	5 ft 4 in (1.63 m)	Sr	DeSoto HS	DeSoto, TX
F	13	Khadijah Shumpert	6 ft 0 in (1.83 m)	Sr	Benilde St. Margaret's HS	Minneapolis, MN
G	14	Jannon Otto	6 ft 1 in (1.85 m)	Fr	Oak Hills HS	Hesperia, CA
G	21	Marissa Perry (W)	5 ft 4 in (1.63 m)	Jr	Hope Christian HS	Albuquerque, NM
G	24	Jayda Bovero	5 ft 11 in (1.8 m)	So	Syracuse HS	Farr West, UT
G	25	Laneah Bryan	5 ft 6 in (1.68 m)	So	Franklin HS	El Paso, TX
F	32	Kianna Keller	6 ft 4 in (1.93 m)	Jr	Waukesha West HS	Waukesha, WI
G	33	Emily Lines	6 ft 1 in (1.85 m)	Fr	First Baptist Academy	Naples, FL
C	34	Whitney Johnson	6 ft 2 in (1.88 m)	RS Jr	Lone Peak HS	Highland, UT
C	44	Jaisa Nunn	6 ft 3 in (1.91 m)	Fr	Juanita HS	Kirkland, WA

Head coach

Yvonne Sanchez (Alliant)

Assistant coach(es)

Joseph Anders (Arkansas–Monticello)
Amy Beggi (New Mexico)
Anthony Turner (Colorado)

Legend

- (C) Team captain
- (S) Suspended
- (I) Ineligible
- (W) Walk-on
- Injured
- Current redshirt

Roster

== Schedule and results ==
Date time, TV	Rank^{#}	Opponent^{#}	Result	Record	Site (attendance) city, state
Exhibition
11/04/2015*; 7:00 pm		Western New Mexico	W 78–41		The Pit; Albuquerque, NM
11/07/2015*; 6:00 pm		New Mexico Highlands	W 80–39		The Pit (5,188); Albuquerque, NM
Non-conference regular season
11/13/2015*; 8:00 pm, RTRM		Houston Baptist	W 65–57	1–0	The Pit (12,269); Albuquerque, NM
11/17/2015*; 7:00 pm, AggieVision		at New Mexico State; Rio Grande Rivalry	L 59–78	1–1	Pan American Center (885); Las Cruces, NM
11/21/2015*; 1:00 pm		Sacramento State	W 84–71	2–1	The Pit (5,178); Albuquerque, NM
11/24/2015*; 7:00 pm		Nicholls State	W 83–43	3–1	The Pit (4,963); Albuquerque, NM
11/27/2015*; 7:00 pm		Southern Utah; UNM Thanksgiving Tournament semifinals	W 70–47	4–1	The Pit (5,144); Albuquerque, NM
11/28/2015*; 4:00 pm		Duquesne; UNM Thanksgiving Tournament championship	L 69–78	4–2	The Pit (5,111); Albuquerque, NM
12/02/2015*; 4:15 pm		at UTEP	L 62–70	4–3	Don Haskins Center (804); El Paso, TX
12/05/2015*; 4:00 pm		at SMU	W 63–58	5–3	Moody Coliseum (979); Dallas, TX
12/12/2015*; 2:00 pm		Pepperdine	W 60–52	6–3	The Pit (5,135); Albuquerque, NM
12/16/2015*; 11:00 am		at Minnesota	W 72–53	7–3	Williams Arena (4,613); Minneapolis, MN
12/20/2015*; 2:00 pm		New Mexico State; Rio Grande Rivalry	L 47–52	7–4	The Pit; Albuquerque, NM
Mountain West regular season
12/30/2015; 7:30 pm		at Nevada	W 51–47	8–4 (1–0)	Lawlor Events Center (1,060); Reno, NV
01/02/2016; 2:00 pm		Fresno State	L 65–69 ^{2OT}	8–5 (1–1)	The Pit (5,493); Albuquerque, NM
01/09/2016; 2:00 pm		at Utah State	L 56–72	8–6 (1–2)	Smith Spectrum (359); Logan, UT
01/13/2016; 7:00 pm		UNLV	W 67–53	9–6 (2–2)	The Pit (4,930); Albuquerque, NM
01/16/2016; 2:00 pm		at Wyoming	L 48–66	9–7 (2–3)	Arena-Auditorium (2,509); Laramie, WY
01/23/2016; 2:00 pm		San Jose State	W 71–57	10–7 (3–3)	The Pit (5,330); Albuquerque, NM
01/27/2016; 7:00 pm		at Air Force	W 63–33	11–7 (4–3)	Clune Arena (132); Colorado Springs, CO
01/30/2016; 2:00 pm		Boise State	L 60–81	11–8 (4–4)	The Pit (5,517); Albuquerque, NM
02/03/2016; 8:00 pm		at UNLV	L 48–57	11–9 (4–5)	Cox Pavilion (805); Paradise, NV
02/06/2016; 2:00 pm		San Diego State	L 46–51	11–10 (4–6)	The Pit (5,356); Albuquerque, NM
02/10/2016; 7:00 pm		Utah State	W 73–70	12–10 (5–6)	The Pit (5,108); Albuquerque, NM
02/13/2016; 3:00 pm		at San Jose State	L 58–59	12–11 (5–7)	Event Center Arena (291); San Jose, CA
02/17/2016; 7:00 pm		at Boise State	W 70–60	13–11 (6–7)	Taco Bell Arena (658); Boise, ID
02/20/2016; 2:00 pm		Air Force	W 58–36	14–11 (7–7)	The Pit (5,586); Albuquerque, NM
02/24/2016; 7:00 pm		No. 25 Colorado State	L 48–49	14–12 (7–8)	The Pit (6,107); Albuquerque, NM
02/27/2016; 3:00 pm		at Fresno State	L 43–51	14–13 (7–9)	Save Mart Center (2,109); Fresno, CA
03/01/2016; 7:30 pm		at San Diego State	W 64–45	15–13 (8–9)	Viejas Arena (303); San Diego, CA
03/04/2016; 7:00 pm		Nevada	W 66–42	16–13 (9–9)	The Pit (5,492); Albuquerque, NM
Mountain West Women's Tournament
03/08/2016; 3:30 pm		vs. San Jose State; Quarterfinals	W 65–51	17–13	Thomas & Mack Center (1,864); Paradise, NV
03/09/2016; 6:30 pm		vs. No. 22 Colorado State; Semifinals	L 42–60	17–14	Thomas & Mack Center; Paradise, NV
WBI
03/16/2016*; 7:00 pm		Weber State; First Round	L 67–75	17–15	Johnson Gymnasium (581); Albuquerque, NM
*Non-conference game. ^{#}Rankings from AP Poll. (#) Tournament seedings in parentheses. All times are in Mountain Time.

== See also ==
- 2015–16 New Mexico Lobos men's basketball team
