= 2015–16 UNLV Lady Rebels basketball team =

Intercollegiate basketball season

2015–16 UNLV Lady Rebels basketball
- Conference: Mountain West Conference
- Record: 18–14 (9–9 Mountain West)
- Head coach: Kathy Olivier (8th season)
- Assistant coaches: Caitlin Collier; Kalee Whipple; Mia Bell
- Home arena: Thomas & Mack Center; Cox Pavilion

2015–16 Mountain West Conference women's basketball standings
	Conf.				Overall
Team	W		L	PCT	W		L	PCT
No. 22 Colorado State †	18	–	0	1.000	31	–	2	.939
Fresno State	15	–	3	.833	22	–	12	.647
Boise State	12	–	6	.667	19	–	11	.633
San Jose State	11	–	7	.611	13	–	17	.433
UNLV	9	–	9	.500	18	–	14	.563
New Mexico	9	–	9	.500	17	–	15	.531
Utah State	8	–	10	.444	14	–	17	.452
Wyoming	6	–	12	.333	13	–	16	.448
San Diego State	6	–	12	.333	12	–	19	.387
Nevada	4	–	14	.222	5	–	25	.167
Air Force	1	–	17	.056	1	–	29	.033
† 2016 MWC tournament winner Rankings from AP poll

The 2015–16 UNLV Lady Rebels basketball team represented the University of Nevada, Las Vegas during the 2015–16 NCAA Division I women's basketball season. The Lady Rebels, led by eighth year head coach Kathy Olivier. They played their home games at the Thomas & Mack Center and the Cox Pavilion on UNLV's main campus in Paradise, Nevada. They were a member of the Mountain West Conference. They finished the season 18–14, 9–9 in Mountain West play to finish in a tie for fifth place. They advanced to the semifinals of the Mountain West women's tournament, where they lost to Fresno State.

== Roster ==
2015–16 UNLV Lady Rebels women's basketball team
Players
Coaches

Pos.	#	Name	Height	Year	Previous school	Hometown
F/C	0	Amie Callaway	6 ft 1 in (1.85 m)	Sr	San Diego HS	San Diego, CA
G	2	Brooke Johnson	5 ft 11 in (1.8 m)	So	Hanford HS	Hanford, CA
F	3	Paris Strawther	6 ft 2 in (1.88 m)	Fr	Liberty HS	Las Vegas, NV
F	5	Simone Sheppard	6 ft 0 in (1.83 m)	So	Sacramento HS	Sacramento, CA
F	10	Nikki Wheatley	5 ft 5 in (1.65 m)	So	Bonita HS	La Verne, CA
G	11	Dylan Gonzales	6 ft 0 in (1.83 m)	RS So	Highland HS; Kansas	Pocatello, ID
G	12	Dakota Gonzales	6 ft 0 in (1.83 m)	RS So	Highland HS; Kansas	Pocatello, ID
C	14	Aley Rohde	6 ft 4 in (1.93 m)	RS Sr	Pinnacle HS; Arizona	Cave Creek, AZ
F	20	Alyssa Anderson	6 ft 0 in (1.83 m)	So	Etiwanda HS	Ranch Cucamonga, CA
C	21	Katie Powell	6 ft 4 in (1.93 m)	So	Duluth HS; Arkansas	Duluth, GA
F/C	22	Destiney Lee	6 ft 2 in (1.88 m)	Fr	C. K. McClatchy HS	Sacramento, CA
F	23	Jordyn Bell	6 ft 1 in (1.85 m)	Fr	Bradshaw Christian HS	Elk Grove, CA
F	42	Jazmin O'Bannon	6 ft 3 in (1.91 m)	So	XXXX	Henderson, NV

Head coach

- Kathy Olivier (UNLV)

Assistant coach(es)

- Caitlin Collier (UC Davis)
- Kalee Whipple (Utah)
- Mia Bell (UNLV)

Legend

- (C) Team captain
- (S) Suspended
- (I) Ineligible
- (W) Walk-on
- Injured
- Current redshirt

Roster

== Schedule ==
Date time, TV	Rank^{#}	Opponent^{#}	Result	Record	Site (attendance) city, state
Exhibition
11/09/2015*; 7:00 pm		Alaska Anchorage	W 84–75		Cox Pavilion; Paradise, NV
Non-conference regular season
11/14/2015*; 3:00 pm		Southern Utah	W 79–44	1–0	Thomas & Mack Center (1,622); Paradise, NV
11/17/2015*; 7:00 pm		Pepperdine	W 83–63	2–0	Cox Pavilion (743); Paradise, NV
11/21/2015*; 2:00 pm		UC Irvine	W 73–53	3–0	Cox Pavilion; Paradise, NV
11/23/2015*; 7:00 pm		Cal State San Marcos	W 62–43	4–0	Cox Pavilion (756); Paradise, NV
11/28/2015*; 12:00 pm		George Mason; Lady Rebel Round-Up semifinals	W 67–59	5–0	Cox Pavilion; Paradise, NV
11/29/2015*; 2:30 pm		Drake; Lady Rebel Round-Up championship	L 68–76	5–1	Cox Pavilion (774); Paradise, NV
12/06/2015*; 2:00 pm		at USC	L 42–73	5–2	Galen Center (824); Los Angeles, CA
12/12/2015*; 12:00 pm		at Houston	W 63–60	6–2	Hofheinz Pavilion (921); Houston, TX
12/14/2015*; 5:00 pm		at Texas A&M–Corpus Christi	W 65–51	7–2	Dugan Wellness Center (327); Corpus Christi, TX
12/19/2015*; 5:00 pm		vs. UTEP; Beach Classic	L 52–60	7–3	Walter Pyramid (153); Long Beach, CA
12/20/2015*; 2:00 pm		at Long Beach State; Beach Classic	L 63–67	7–4	Walter Pyramid (676); Long Beach, CA
Mountain West regular season
12/30/2015; 7:00 pm		at Fresno State	L 54–58	7–5 (0–1)	Save Mart Center (4,760); Fresno, CA
01/06/2016; 7:00 pm		Colorado State	L 56–64	7–6 (0–2)	Cox Pavilion (842); Paradise, NV
01/09/2016; 7:00 pm		Wyoming	W 66–37	8–6 (1–2)	Cox Pavilion (1,703); Paradise, NV
01/13/2016; 6:00 pm		at New Mexico	L 53–67	8–7 (1–3)	The Pit (4,930); Albuquerque, NM
01/16/2016; 5:00 pm		at Air Force	W 60–56	9–7 (2–3)	Clune Arena (511); Colorado Springs, CO
01/20/2016; 7:00 pm		Utah State	W 46–38	10–7 (3–3)	Cox Pavilion (1,342); Paradise, NV
01/23/2016; 3:00 pm		Nevada	W 65–59	11–7 (4–3)	Cox Pavilion (1,609); Paradise, NV
01/27/2016; 6:00 pm		at Boise State	L 56–75	11–8 (4–4)	Taco Bell Arena (807); Boise, ID
01/30/2016; 2:00 pm		at San Diego State	W 55–41	12–8 (5–4)	Viejas Arena (2,400); San Diego, CA
02/03/2016; 7:00 pm		New Mexico	W 57–48	13–8 (5–5)	Cox Pavilion (805); Paradise, NV
02/06/2016; 3:00 pm		Fresno State	L 52–57	13–9 (6–5)	Cox Pavilion (1,619); Paradise, NV
02/10/2016; 7:00 pm		at San Jose State	L 61–69	13–10 (6–6)	Event Center Arena (382); San Jose, CA
02/13/2016; 2:00 pm		at Colorado State	L 52–83	13–11 (6–7)	Moby Arena (2,353); Fort Collins, CO
02/17/2016; 7:00 pm		Air Force	W 62–51	14–11 (7–7)	Cox Pavilion (801); Paradise, NV
02/20/2016; 4:00 pm		at Nevada	L 65–71	14–12 (7–8)	Lawlor Events Center (1,765); Reno, NV
02/24/2016; 7:00 pm		Boise State	W 78–68	15–12 (8–8)	Cox Pavilion (1,174); Paradise, NV
02/27/2016; 1:00 pm		at Wyoming	L 57–80	15–13 (8–9)	Arena-Auditorium (3,137); Laramie, WY
03/04/2016; 5:00 pm		San Diego State	W 62–51	16–13 (9–9)	Cox Pavilion (1,276); Paradise, NV
Mountain West Women's Tournament
03/07/2016; 7:00 pm		vs. Air Force; First Round	W 55–42	17–13	Thomas & Mack Center (1,648); Paradise, NV
03/08/2016; 6:00 pm		vs. Boise State; Quarterfinals	W 71–65	18–13	Thomas & Mack Center (1,393); Paradise, NV
03/09/2016; 9:00 pm		vs. Fresno State; Semifinals	L 60–66	18–14	Thomas & Mack Center (2,160); Paradise, NV
*Non-conference game. ^{#}Rankings from AP Poll. (#) Tournament seedings in parentheses. All times are in Pacific Time.

== See also ==
2015–16 UNLV Runnin' Rebels basketball team
