= Sanda Secondary School =

Coordinates: 57.7842°N 14.2597°E

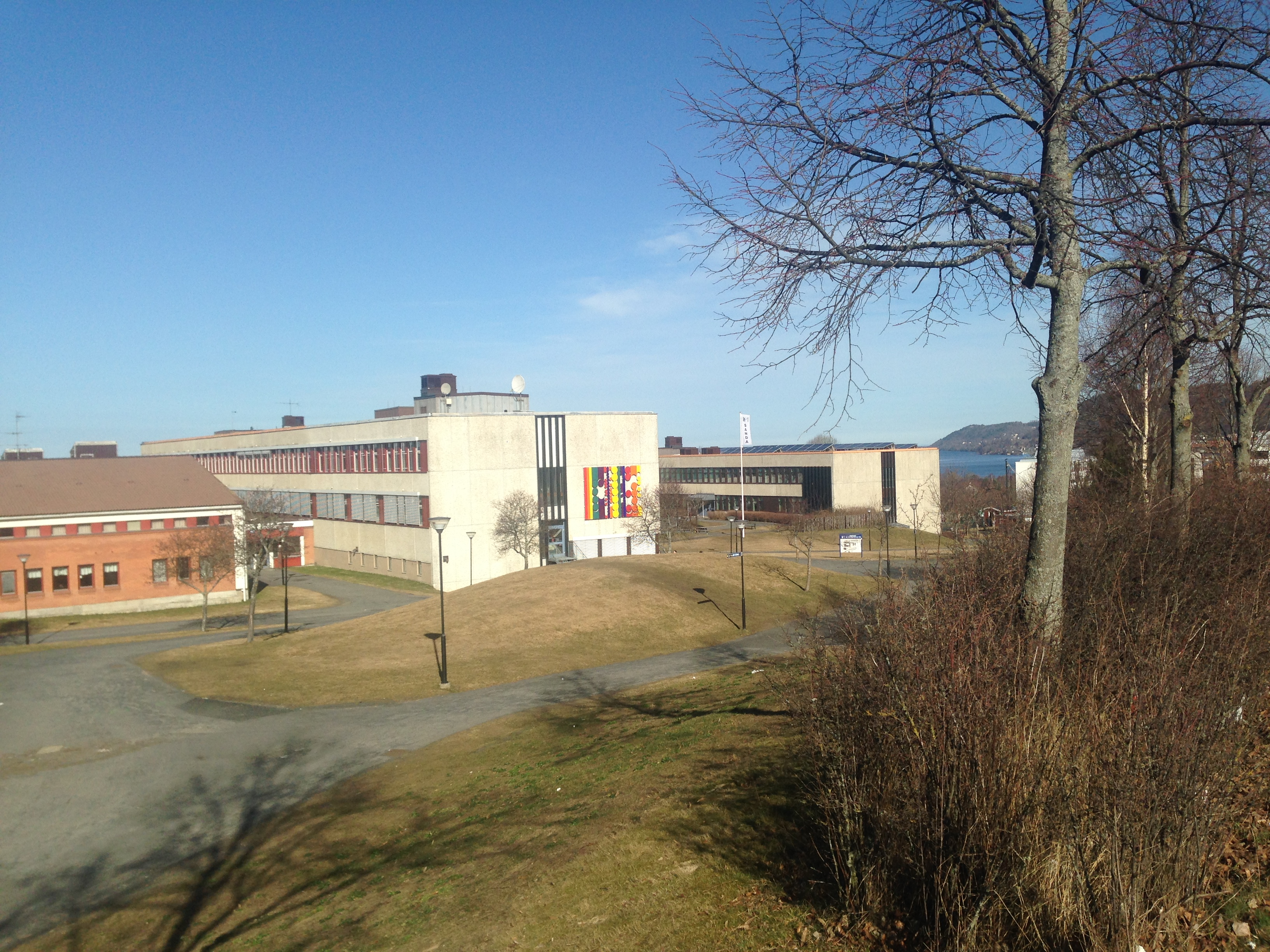
- Sanda Secondary School
- Huskvarna; Sweden

Information
- Type: secondary school
- Opened: 22 August 1970

The Sanda Secondary School (Swedish: Sandagymnasiet) is a secondary school in Huskvarna, Sweden, opened for the 1970–1971 school year. Since 1979, the school has a sports profile, starting with basketball and cross-country skiing. Later, more sports have been added, for example ice hockey (starting in the 1995–1996 season/school year). In the 2005–2006 season/school year, the school won the Swedish Boys' Floorball Championship for boys born 1987.
