= KBYU =

KBYU may refer to:

- KBYU-TV, a television station (channel 17, virtual 11) licensed to Provo, Utah, United States
- KBYU-FM, a radio station (89.1 FM) licensed to Provo, Utah, United States
- BYU Television, a world-wide satellite and internet television station providing LDS programming
- BYU Television International, a cable/satellite television channel operated by Brigham Young University, broadcasting simultaneously in English, Spanish and Portuguese
