= 2016 West Coast Conference women's basketball tournament =

- Classification: Division I
- Season: 2015–16
- Teams: 10
- Finals site: Orleans Arena; Paradise, Nevada
- Champions: San Francisco (4th title)
- Winning coach: Jennifer Azzi (1st title)
- MVP: Taylor Proctor (San Francisco)
- Attendance: 32,209
- Television: ESPNU/BYUtv

2015–16 West Coast Conference women's basketball standings
	Conf.				Overall
Team	W		L	PCT	W		L	PCT
BYU	16	–	2	.889	26	–	7	.788
Saint Mary's	14	–	4	.778	24	–	8	.750
San Diego	13	–	5	.722	24	–	8	.750
Santa Clara	13	–	5	.722	23	–	9	.719
Gonzaga	10	–	8	.556	19	–	14	.576
San Francisco †	9	–	9	.500	21	–	12	.636
Pacific	6	–	12	.333	13	–	17	.433
Loyola Marymount	6	–	12	.333	11	–	20	.355
Pepperdine	2	–	16	.111	7	–	24	.226
Portland	1	–	17	.056	3	–	27	.100
† Tournament winner As of March 22, 2016; Rankings from AP poll

The 2016 West Coast Conference women's basketball tournament was held March 3–8, 2016, at Orleans Arena in the Las Vegas Valley community of Paradise, Nevada. Seeds will be determined solely on conference record. San Francisco won the conference's automatic bid to the 2016 NCAA Division I women's basketball tournament.

== Seeds ==
WCC tiebreaker procedures went as follows:

1. Head-to-head
2. Better record against a higher seed
3. Higher RPI

Seed	School	Conference	Overall*	Tiebreaker
1	BYU	16–2	24–4	
2	Saint Mary's	14–4	23–6	
3	San Diego	13–5	23–6	1–1 vs. SCU, 1–1 vs. BYU
4	Santa Clara	13–5	22–7	1–1 vs. USD, 0–2 vs. BYU
5	Gonzaga	10–8	18–12	
6	San Francisco	9–9	18–11	
7	Loyola Marymount	6–12	10–19	2–0 vs. Pacific
8	Pacific	6–12	13–16	0–2 vs. LMU
9	Pepperdine	2–16	6–23	
10	Portland	1–17	5–26	

* Overall record at end of regular season.

== Schedule ==
Session	Game	Time*	Matchup^{#}	Television	Attendance
First round – Thursday March 3, 2016
1	1	12:00 PM	#8 Pacific vs. #9 Pepperdine	BYUtv	6,071
1	2	2:00 PM	#7 Loyola Marymount vs. #10 Portland	BYUtv	6,071
Quarterfinals – Thursday, March 3 & Friday March 4, 2016
2	3	6:00 PM	#3 San Diego vs. #6 San Francisco	BYUtv	6,071
2	4	8:00 PM	#4 Santa Clara vs. #5 Gonzaga	BYUtv	6,071
3	5	12:00 PM	#1 BYU vs. #9 Pepperdine	BYUtv	6,261
3	6	2:00 PM	#2 Saint Mary's vs. #7 Loyola Marymount	BYUtv	6,261
Semifinals – Monday, March 7, 2016
4	7	12:00 PM	#4 Santa Clara vs #1 BYU	BYUtv	6,990
4	8	2:00 PM	#6 San Francisco vs #2 Saint Mary's	BYUtv	6,990
Championship – Tuesday, March 8, 2016
5	9	1:00 PM	#1 BYU vs. #6 San Francisco	ESPNU	6,816
*Game times in PT. #-Rankings denote tournament seeding.

== Bracket and scores ==
- All BYUtv games were simulcast online and streamed at TheW.tv.

First round
8	Pacific	72
9	Pepperdine	81
7	Loyola Marymount	85
10	Portland	72

Quarterfinals
1	BYU	72
9	Pepperdine	59
4	Santa Clara	59
5	Gonzaga	58
2	Saint Mary's	85
7	Loyola Marymount	71
3	San Diego	80
6	San Francisco	84^{OT}

Semifinals
1	BYU	87
4	Santa Clara	67
2	Saint Mary's	65
6	San Francisco	67

Championship
1	BYU	68
6	San Francisco	70

== Game summaries ==
=== Pacific vs. Pepperdine ===
Series History: Pacific leads series 6–3
Broadcasters: Spencer Linton & Kristen Kozlowski

BYUtv

Mar 3
12:00 pm PST

Recap

Pepperdine Waves 81, Pacific Tigers 72
Scoring by quarter: 26–23, 20–11, 12–20, 23–18
Pts: Paige Fecske 21; Rebs: Paige Fecske 8 Asts: Paige Fecske 6	Pts: Hailie Eackles 18; Rebs: Najah Queenland 9 Asts: GeAnna Luaulu-Summers 8

Orleans Arena
Paradise, NV
Attendance: 6,071
Referees: Shelly Russi, Tiffany Bird, Benny Luna

=== Loyola Marymount vs. Portland ===
Series History: Portland leads series 31–29
Broadcasters: Spencer Linton & Kristen Kozlowski

BYUtv

Mar 3
2:00 pm PST

Recap

Portland Pilots 72, Loyola Marymount Lions 85
Scoring by quarter: 19–27, 20–24, 18–14, 15–20
Pts: Darian Slaga, Corissa Turley 18; Rebs: Corissa Turley 11; Asts: Darian Slaga 3	Pts: Andee Velasco 23; Rebs: Sophie Taylor 9 Asts: Andee Velasco 8

Orleans Arena
Paradise, NV
Attendance: 6,071
Referees: Bart Baldwin, Cheryl Flores, Ken Nash

=== San Diego vs. San Francisco ===
Series History: San Diego leads series 38–27
Broadcasters: Dave McCann & Blaine Fowler

BYUtv

Mar 3
6:00 pm PST

Recap

San Francisco Dons 84, San Diego Toreros 80 (OT)
Scoring by quarter: 19–20, 9–16, 20–21, 25–16, Overtime: 11–7
Pts: Rachel Howard 26; Rebs: Taylor Proctor 7 Asts: Rachel Howard, Taylor Proctor 4	Pts: Malina Hood 33; Rebs: Maya Hood 11; Asts: Cori Woodward 5

Orleans Arena
Paradise, NV
Attendance: 6,071
Referees: Darren Krzesnik, In'Fini Robinson, Ify Seales

=== Santa Clara vs. Gonzaga ===
Series History: Gonzaga leads series 34–28
Broadcasters: Dave McCann & Blaine Fowler

BYUtv

Mar 3
8:00 pm PST

Recap

Gonzaga Bulldogs 58, Santa Clara Broncos 59
Scoring by quarter: 15–13, 14–11, 15–22, 14–13
Pts: Shelby Cheslek 14; Rebs: Shelby Cheslek 10; Asts: Laura Stockton 4	Pts: Marie Bertholdt 20; Rebs: Marie Bertholdt 8 Asts: Marie Bertholdt, Savanna Hanson 3

Orleans Arena
Paradise, NV
Attendance: 6,071
Referees: Karen Lasuik, Brian Woods, Paul Patterson

=== BYU vs. Pepperdine ===
Series History: BYU leads series 12–2
Broadcasters: Spencer Linton & Kristen Kozlowski

BYUtv

Mar 4
12:00 pm PST

Pepperdine Waves 59, BYU Cougars 72
Scoring by quarter: 14–14, 6–16, 15–25, 24–17
Pts: Kelsey Brockway 12; Rebs: Allie Green, Kelsey Brockway 8 Asts: Allie Green 4	Pts: Lexi Rydalch 28; Rebs: Lexi Rydalch 12; Asts: Kalani Purcell 8

Orleans Arena
Paradise, NV
Attendance: 6,261
Referees: Darren Krzesnik, In'Fini Robinson, Cheryl Flores

=== Saint Mary's vs. Loyola Marymount ===
Series History: Saint Mary's leads series 45–16
Broadcasters: Spencer Linton & Kristen Kozlowski

BYUtv

Mar 4
2:00 pm PST

Loyola Marymount Lions 71, Saint Mary's Gaels 85
Scoring by quarter: 20–23, 12–10, 17–31, 22–21
Pts: Leslie Lopez-Wood 18; Rebs: Cheyanne Wallace 8 Asts: Andee Velasco 6	Pts: Lauren Nicholson 24; Rebs: Stella Beck 9 Asts: Lauren Nicholson 4

Orleans Arena
Paradise, NV
Attendance: 6,261
Referees: Karen Lasuik, Brian Woods, Richard Waters

=== BYU vs. Santa Clara ===
Series History: BYU leads series 12–1
Broadcasters: Dave McCann & Blaine Fowler

BYUtv

Mar 7
12:00 p.m. PDT

Santa Clara Broncos 67, BYU Cougars 87
Scoring by quarter: 12–16, 15–16, 20–21, 20–34
Pts: Lori Parkinson 24; Rebs: Marie Bertholdt 10; Asts: Savanna Hanson 3	Pts: Lexi Rydalch 25; Rebs: Kalani Purcell 17; Asts: Kylie Maeda 5

Orleans Arena
Paradise, NV
Attendance: 6,990
Referees: Shelley Russi, Karen Lasuik, Brian Woods

=== Saint Mary's vs. San Francisco ===
Series History: Saint Mary's leads series 39–24
Broadcasters: Dave McCann & Blaine Fowler

BYUtv

Mar 7
2:30 p.m. PDT

San Francisco Dons 67, Saint Mary's Gaels 65
Scoring by quarter: 15–12, 10-10, 12–19, 30–24
Pts: Taylor Proctor 19; Rebs: Taylor Proctor 12; Asts: Taylor Proctor 5	Pts: Lauren Nicholson 22; Rebs: Carly Turner 10; Asts: Carly Turner 3

Orleans Arena
Paradise, NV
Attendance: 6,990
Referees: Darren Krzesnik, Bart Baldwin, In'Fini Robinson

=== WCC Championship: BYU vs. San Francisco ===
Series History: BYU leads series 15–2
Broadcasters: Roxy Bernstein & Chiney Ogwumike (ESPNU)
Dave McCann & Blaine Fowler (BYU Radio)

ESPNU
BYU Radio

Mar 8
1:00 p.m. PDT

San Francisco Dons 70, BYU Cougars 68
Scoring by quarter: 14–26, 23–16, 17–16, 16–10
Pts: Taylor Proctor 27; Rebs: Taylor Proctor 10; Asts: Anna Seilund 3	Pts: Lexi Rydalch 23; Rebs: Kalani Purcell 16; Asts: Kylie Maeda 7

Orleans Arena
Paradise, NV
Attendance: 6,816
Referees: Anita Ortega, Michol Murray, Cathi Cornell

== See also ==
- 2015–16 NCAA Division I women's basketball season
- West Coast Conference men's basketball tournament
- 2016 West Coast Conference men's basketball tournament
- West Coast Conference women's basketball tournament
