= 2015–16 Saint Mary's Gaels women's basketball team =

Intercollegiate basketball season

2015–16 Saint Mary's Gaels women's basketball

Cal Classic Champions

WNIT, First Round
- Conference: West Coast Conference
- Record: 24–8 (14–4 WCC)
- Head coach: Paul Thomas (10th season)
- Assistant coaches: Tracy Sanders; Allyson Fasnacht; Lisa O'Meara
- Home arena: McKeon Pavilion

2015–16 West Coast Conference women's basketball standings
	Conf.				Overall
Team	W		L	PCT	W		L	PCT
BYU	16	–	2	.889	26	–	7	.788
Saint Mary's	14	–	4	.778	24	–	8	.750
San Diego	13	–	5	.722	24	–	8	.750
Santa Clara	13	–	5	.722	23	–	9	.719
Gonzaga	10	–	8	.556	19	–	14	.576
San Francisco †	9	–	9	.500	21	–	12	.636
Pacific	6	–	12	.333	13	–	17	.433
Loyola Marymount	6	–	12	.333	11	–	20	.355
Pepperdine	2	–	16	.111	7	–	24	.226
Portland	1	–	17	.056	3	–	27	.100
† Tournament winner As of March 22, 2016; Rankings from AP poll

The 2015–16 Saint Mary's Gaels women's basketball team represented Saint Mary's College of California in the 2015–16 college basketball season. It was head coach Paul Thomas's tenth season at Saint Mary's. The Gaels, members of the West Coast Conference, played their home games at the McKeon Pavilion. They finished the season 24–8, 14–4 in WCC play to finish in second place. They advanced to the semifinals of the WCC women's basketball tournament, where they lost to San Francisco. They were invited to the Women's National Invitation Tournament, where they lost to Eastern Michigan in the first round.

== Roster ==
2015–16 Saint Mary's Gaels women's basketball team
Players
Coaches

Pos.	#	Name	Height	Year	Previous school	Hometown
G	1	Lauren Nicholson	6 ft 0 in (1.83 m)	Sr	Woolooware	Sydney, Australia
G	4	Devyn Galland	5 ft 8 in (1.73 m)	RS Jr	Lewis & Clark; Oregon	Spokane, WA
G	5	Hannah Kaser	5 ft 10 in (1.78 m)	Sr	Australian Institute of Sport	Eltham, Australia
G	10	Carly Turner	5 ft 11 in (1.8 m)	So	Australian Institute of Sport	Sydney, Australia
F	11	Valerie Moore	5 ft 10 in (1.78 m)	RS Jr	Modesto Christian	Merced, CA
F	12	Sydney Raggio	6 ft 1 in (1.85 m)	Fr	St. Ignatius	San Bruno, CA
F	13	Lisa Janko	6 ft 1 in (1.85 m)	So	Rhein MB II	Essen, Germany
G	14	Shannon Mauldin	5 ft 9 in (1.75 m)	Sr	Saint Mary's	San Pablo, CA
G	20	Katie Rathbun	6 ft 0 in (1.83 m)	Fr	Carondelet	Concord, CA
G	21	Stella Beck	6 ft 0 in (1.83 m)	So	Hutt Valley	Lower Hutt, New Zealand
F	22	Devon Brookshire	6 ft 2 in (1.88 m)	RS Jr	Bishop Montgomery; Northwestern	Rancho Palos Verdes, CA
G	23	Alia McCoy	5 ft 11 in (1.8 m)	RS So	Canyon	Santa Clarita, CA
G	24	Samira McDonald	5 ft 9 in (1.75 m)	RS Jr	River Ridge	Lacey, WA
F	25	Megan McKay	6 ft 3 in (1.91 m)	Fr	St. Mary's Anglican	Katanning, Australia

Head coach

- Paul Thomas (Wayne State College)

Assistant coach(es)

- Tracy Sanders (St. Mary's)
- Allyson Fasnacht (Liberty)
- Lisa O'Meara (St. Mary's)

Legend

- (C) Team captain
- (S) Suspended
- (I) Ineligible
- (W) Walk-on
- Injured
- Current redshirt

Roster

== Schedule and results ==
Date time, TV	Rank^{#}	Opponent^{#}	Result	Record	Site (attendance) city, state
Non-conference regular season
11/13/2015*; 2:00 pm		at Cal State Northridge	W 93–59	1–0	Matadome (348); Northridge, CA
11/15/2015*; 1:00 pm, TheW.tv		San Jose State	W 91–81	2–0	McKeon Pavilion (379); Moraga, CA
11/20/2015*; 6:00 pm, MW Net		at Wyoming	W 70–64	3–0	Arena-Auditorium (2,423); Laramie, WY
11/22/2015*; 5:00 pm		at Northern Colorado	W 65–52	4–0	Bank of Colorado Arena (521); Greeley, CO
11/27/2015*; 2:00 pm, TheW.tv		Fresno State; Saint Mary's Classic	W 83–81 ^{OT}	5–0	McKeon Pavilion (477); Moraga, CA
11/28/2015*; 2:00 pm, TheW.tv		Missouri; Saint Mary's Classic	L 78–95	5–1	McKeon Pavilion (485); Moraga, CA
12/03/2015*; 6:30 pm, TheW.tv		UC Davis	L 71–78 ^{OT}	5–2	McKeon Pavilion (221); Moraga, CA
12/05/2015*; 4:00 pm		at No. 18 California; Cal Classic semifinals	W 64–63	6–2	Haas Pavilion; Berkeley, CA
12/06/2015*; 3:00 pm		vs. Villanova; Cal Classic championship	W 67–60	7–2	Haas Pavilion; Berkeley, CA
12/12/2015*; 1:00 pm, TheW.tv		Washington State	W 75–71	8–2	McKeon Pavilion (257); Moraga, CA
12/17/2015*; 6:30 pm, TheW.tv		Cal Poly	W 87–83 ^{OT}	9–2	McKeon Pavilion (209); Moraga, CA
WCC regular season
12/21/2015; 7:00 pm, TheW.tv		at San Francisco	W 78–68	10–2 (1–0)	War Memorial Gymnasium (438); San Francisco, CA
12/23/2015; 1:00 pm, TheW.tv		Santa Clara	L 67–73	10–3 (1–1)	McKeon Pavilion (470); Moraga, CA
12/31/2015; 12:00 pm, BYUtv		at BYU	L 59–65	10–4 (1–2)	Marriott Center (1,209); Provo, UT
01/02/2016; 2:00 pm, TheW.tv		at San Diego	W 73–68	11–4 (2–2)	Jenny Craig Pavilion (302); San Diego, CA
01/07/2016; 6:30 pm, TheW.tv		Loyola Marymount	W 72–57	12–4 (3–2)	McKeon Pavilion (619); Moraga, CA
01/09/2016; 1:00 pm, TheW.tv		Pepperdine	W 88–72	13–4 (4–2)	McKeon Pavilion (404); Moraga, CA
01/16/2016; 3:00 pm, TheW.tv		at Pacific	W 82–73	14–4 (5–2)	Alex G. Spanos Center (2,205); Stockton, CA
01/21/2016; 6:00 pm, TheW.tv		at Gonzaga	W 69–68	15–4 (6–2)	McCarthey Athletic Center (5,593); Spokane, WA
01/23/2016; 1:00 pm, CSNNW		at Portland	W 78–51	16–4 (7–2)	Chiles Center (361); Portland, OR
01/30/2016; 1:00 pm, TheW.tv		Pacific	W 83–75	17–4 (8–2)	McKeon Pavilion (509); Moraga, CA
02/04/2016; 6:30 pm, TheW.tv		San Diego	W 68–60	18–4 (9–2)	McKeon Pavilion (330); Moraga, CA
02/06/2016; 1:00 pm, TheW.tv		BYU	L 44–65	18–5 (9–3)	McKeon Pavilion (359); Moraga, CA
02/11/2016; 7:00 pm, TheW.tv		at Pepperdine	L 58–62	18–6 (9–4)	Firestone Fieldhouse (195); Malibu, CA
02/13/2016; 2:00 pm, TheW.tv		at Loyola Marymount	W 91–81	19–6 (10–4)	Gersten Pavilion (441); Los Angeles, CA
02/18/2016; 6:30 pm, TheW.tv		Gonzaga	W 66–47	20–6 (11–4)	McKeon Pavilion (405); Moraga, CA
02/20/2016; 1:00 pm, TheW.tv		Portland	W 95–53	21–6 (12–4)	McKeon Pavilion (419); Moraga, CA
02/25/2016; 6:00 pm, TheW.tv		at Santa Clara	W 78–70	22–6 (13–4)	Leavey Center (500); Santa Clara, CA
02/27/2016; 1:00 pm, TheW.tv		San Francisco	W 72–59	23–6 (14–4)	McKeon Pavilion (471); Moraga, CA
WCC Women's Tournament
03/04/2016; 2:00 pm, BYUtv		vs. Loyola Marymount; Quarterfinals	W 85–71	24–6	Orleans Arena (6,261); Paradise, NV
03/07/2016; 2:00 pm, BYUtv		vs. San Francisco; Semifinals	L 65–67	24–7	Orleans Arena (6,990); Paradise, NV
WNIT
03/17/2016*; 7:00 pm, TheW.tv		Eastern Michigan; First Round	L 73–74	24–8	McKeon Pavilion (250); Moraga, CA
*Non-conference game. ^{#}Rankings from AP Poll. (#) Tournament seedings in parentheses. All times are in Pacific Time.

== See also ==
- 2015–16 Saint Mary's Gaels men's basketball team
