= 2015–16 San Francisco Dons women's basketball team =

Intercollegiate basketball season

2015–16 San Francisco Dons women's basketball
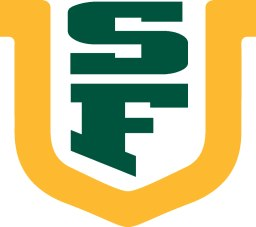

WCC Tournament champions

NCAA Women's Tournament, first round
- Conference: West Coast Conference
- Record: 21–12 (9–9 WCC)
- Head coach: Jennifer Azzi (6th season)
- Assistant coaches: Blair Hardiek; Shanele Stires; Britinee Yasukochi
- Home arena: War Memorial Gymnasium

2015–16 West Coast Conference women's basketball standings
	Conf.				Overall
Team	W		L	PCT	W		L	PCT
BYU	16	–	2	.889	26	–	7	.788
Saint Mary's	14	–	4	.778	24	–	8	.750
San Diego	13	–	5	.722	24	–	8	.750
Santa Clara	13	–	5	.722	23	–	9	.719
Gonzaga	10	–	8	.556	19	–	14	.576
San Francisco †	9	–	9	.500	21	–	12	.636
Pacific	6	–	12	.333	13	–	17	.433
Loyola Marymount	6	–	12	.333	11	–	20	.355
Pepperdine	2	–	16	.111	7	–	24	.226
Portland	1	–	17	.056	3	–	27	.100
† Tournament winner As of March 22, 2016; Rankings from AP poll

The 2015–16 San Francisco Dons women's basketball team represented the University of San Francisco in the 2015–16 college basketball season. It was head coach Jennifer Azzi's sixth season at San Francisco. The Dons, members of the West Coast Conference, played their home games at War Memorial Gymnasium. They finished the season 21–12, 9–9 in WCC play to finish in sixth place. They won the WCC women's tournament and earn automatic trip to NCAA women's tournament for the first time since 1997. They lost to Stanford in the first round.

On September 15, 2016, Azzi resigned as head coach of the Dons to pursue new career opportunities. She finished with a six-year record of 73–114.

== Roster ==
2015–16 San Francisco Dons women's basketball team
Players
Coaches

Pos.	#	Name	Height	Year	Previous school	Hometown
G	1	Zhane Dykes	5 ft 9 in (1.75 m)	Sr	Bishop Gorman	Las Vegas, NV
F	2	Dagny McConnell	6 ft 3 in (1.91 m)	Fr	Beaverton	Beaverton, OR
G	3	Raushan Gultekin	5 ft 7 in (1.7 m)	Jr	Salt Lake CC	Lund, Sweden
G	11	Rachel Howard	5 ft 10 in (1.78 m)	Jr	Berkeley	Berkeley, CA
G	12	Jaylin Jones	5 ft 11 in (1.8 m)	Fr	El Dorado	Placentia, CA
F	14	Michaela Rakova	6 ft 3 in (1.91 m)	So	Gymnazium Hubeneho	Ivanka pri Dunaji, Slovakia
F	20	Cierra Roufosse	6 ft 3 in (1.91 m)	Fr	W. J. Mouat	Abbotsford, BC
G	21	Anna Seilund	5 ft 9 in (1.75 m)	So	Falkonergaarden	Copenhagen, Denmark
F	22	Claudia Price	5 ft 11 in (1.8 m)	Jr	West Mesquite	Mesquite, TX
C	25	Zayn Dornstauder	6 ft 4 in (1.93 m)	Fr	Hamilton	Regina, SK
F	32	Taylor Proctor	6 ft 0 in (1.83 m)	Sr	Sand Creek	Colorado Springs, CO
G	35	Kalyn Simon	5 ft 9 in (1.75 m)	RS So	Archbishop Mitty	San Jose, CA
G	43	Ninni Salmi	6 ft 2 in (1.88 m)	Fr	Mäkelänrinne	Kauhajoki, Finland
F	44	Hashima Carothers	5 ft 11 in (1.8 m)	Jr	Eastside College Prep	Las Vegas, NV

Head coach

- Jennifer Azzi (Stanford)

Assistant coach(es)

- Blair Hardiek (Missouri)
- Shanele Stires (Kansas State)
- Britinee Yasukochi (Occidental)

Legend

- (C) Team captain
- (S) Suspended
- (I) Ineligible
- (W) Walk-on
- Injured
- Current redshirt

Roster

== Schedule and results ==
Date time, TV	Rank^{#}	Opponent^{#}	Result	Record	Site (attendance) city, state
Exhibition
11/07/2015*; 2:00 pm		Stanislaus State	W 93–50		War Memorial Gymnasium (260); San Francisco, CA
Non-conference regular season
11/13/2015*; 3:00 pm		at North Texas	W 69–61	1–0	The Super Pit (550); Denton, TX
11/17/2015*; 7:00 pm, TheW.tv		Holy Names	W 77–31	2–0	War Memorial Gymnasium (204); San Francisco, CA
11/20/2015*; 7:00 pm, TheW.tv		Cal Poly	L 61–62	2–1	War Memorial Gymnasium (356); San Francisco, CA
11/23/2015*; 6:00 pm, YouTube		at Utah Valley	L 88–94 ^{OT}	2–2	UCCU Center (241); Orem, UT
11/25/2015*; 5:30 pm, TheW.tv		North Dakota	W 74–57	3–2	War Memorial Gymnasium (301); San Francisco, CA
11/28/2015*; 12:05 pm		at Sacramento State	W 95–94	4–2	Hornets Nest (387); Sacramento, CA
12/01/2015*; 6:30 pm, MW Net		at Nevada	W 70–62	5–2	Lawlor Events Center (796); Reno, NV
12/04/2015*; 6:00 pm, TheW.tv		UC Riverside	W 88–76	6–2	War Memorial Gymnasium (160); San Francisco, CA
12/06/2015*; 2:00 pm, MW Net		at San Jose State	W 82–78	7–2	Event Center Arena (230); San Jose, CA
12/08/2015*; 7:00 pm		at Long Beach State	W 66–52	8–2	Walter Pyramid (652); Long Beach, CA
12/19/2015*; 2:00 pm, TheW.tv		San Francisco State	W 73–45	9–2	War Memorial Gymnasium (289); San Francisco, CA
WCC regular season
12/21/2015; 7:00 pm, TheW.tv		Saint Mary's	L 68–78	9–3 (0–1)	War Memorial Gymnasium (438); San Francisco, CA
12/23/2015; 5:00 pm, TheW.tv		at Pacific	L 57–70	9–4 (0–2)	Alex G. Spanos Center (317); Stockton, CA
12/31/2015; 5:00 pm, TheW.tv		at Gonzaga	L 47–68	9–5 (0–3)	McCarthey Athletic Center (5,733); Spokane, WA
01/02/2016; 2:00 pm, TheW.tv		at Portland	W 82–63	10–5 (1–3)	Chiles Center (274); Portland, OR
01/07/2016; 7:00 pm, TheW.tv		San Diego	L 58–67 ^{OT}	10–6 (1–4)	War Memorial Gymnasium (403); San Francisco, CA
01/09/2016; 2:00 pm, TheW.tv		BYU	L 57–66	10–7 (1–5)	War Memorial Gymnasium (386); San Francisco, CA
01/14/2016; 7:00 pm, TheW.tv		at Loyola Marymount	W 75–73 ^{OT}	11–7 (2–5)	Gersten Pavilion (453); Los Angeles, CA
01/16/2016; 1:00 pm, TheW.tv		at Pepperdine	W 81–74	12–7 (3–5)	Firestone Fieldhouse (189); Malibu, CA
01/23/2016; 2:00 pm, TheW.tv		at Santa Clara	L 57–68	12–8 (3–6)	Leavey Center (250); Santa Clara, CA
01/28/2016; 7:00 pm, TheW.tv		Portland	W 90–69	13–8 (4–6)	War Memorial Gymnasium (279); San Francisco, CA
01/30/2016; 2:00 pm, TheW.tv		Gonzaga	W 71–52	14–8 (5–6)	War Memorial Gymnasium (567); San Francisco, CA
02/04/2016; 7:00 pm, TheW.tv		Santa Clara	L 57–59	14–9 (5–7)	War Memorial Gymnasium (304); San Francisco, CA
02/11/2016; 5:00 pm, BYUtv		at BYU	L 62–65	14–10 (5–8)	Marriott Center (762); Provo, UT
02/13/2016; 2:00 pm, TheW.tv		at San Diego	W 59–54	15–10 (6–8)	Jenny Craig Pavilion (604); San Diego, CA
02/18/2016; 7:00 pm, TheW.tv		Pepperdine	W 99–75	16–10 (7–8)	War Memorial Gymnasium (297); San Francisco, CA
02/20/2016; 2:00 pm, TheW.tv		Loyola Marymount	W 81–72	17–10 (8–8)	War Memorial Gymnasium (512); San Francisco, CA
02/25/2016; 7:00 pm, TheW.tv		Pacific	W 81–71	18–10 (9–8)	War Memorial Gymnasium (346); San Francisco, CA
02/27/2016; 1:00 pm, TheW.tv		at Saint Mary's	L 59–72	18–11 (9–9)	McKeon Pavilion (471); Moraga, CA
WCC Women's Tournament
03/03/2016; 6:00 pm, BYUtv	(6)	vs. (3) San Diego; Quarterfinals	W 84–80 ^{OT}	19–11	Orleans Arena (6,071); Las Vegas, NV
03/07/2016; 2:00 pm, BYUtv	(6)	vs. (2) Saint Mary's; Semifinals	W 67–65	20–11	Orleans Arena (6,990); Las Vegas, NV
03/08/2016; 1:00 pm, ESPNU	(6)	vs. (1) BYU; Championship Game	W 70–68	21–11	Orleans Arena (6,816); Las Vegas, NV
NCAA Women's Tournament
03/18/2016*; 6:00 pm, ESPN2	(13 L)	at (4 L) No. 13 Stanford; First Round	L 58–85	21–12	Maples Pavilion (3,106); Stanford, CA
*Non-conference game. ^{#}Rankings from AP Poll. (#) Tournament seedings in parentheses. L=Lexington Region. All times are in Pacific Time.

== See also ==
- 2015–16 San Francisco Dons men's basketball team
- San Francisco Dons women's basketball
