= 2015–16 Loyola Marymount Lions women's basketball team =

Intercollegiate basketball season

2015–16 Loyola Marymount Lions women's basketball
- Conference: West Coast Conference
- Record: 11–20 (6–12 WCC)
- Head coach: Charity Elliott (4th season)
- Assistant coaches: April Phillips; Chris Elliott; Kiva Herman
- Home arena: Gersten Pavilion

2015–16 West Coast Conference women's basketball standings
| | Conf. | | | | Overall |
| Team | W | | L | PCT | W | | L | PCT |
|---|---|---|---|---|---|---|---|---|
| BYU | 16 | – | 2 | .889 | 26 | – | 7 | .788 |
| Saint Mary's | 14 | – | 4 | .778 | 24 | – | 8 | .750 |
| San Diego | 13 | – | 5 | .722 | 24 | – | 8 | .750 |
| Santa Clara | 13 | – | 5 | .722 | 23 | – | 9 | .719 |
| Gonzaga | 10 | – | 8 | .556 | 19 | – | 14 | .576 |
| San Francisco † | 9 | – | 9 | .500 | 21 | – | 12 | .636 |
| Pacific | 6 | – | 12 | .333 | 13 | – | 17 | .433 |
| Loyola Marymount | 6 | – | 12 | .333 | 11 | – | 20 | .355 |
| Pepperdine | 2 | – | 16 | .111 | 7 | – | 24 | .226 |
| Portland | 1 | – | 17 | .056 | 3 | – | 27 | .100 |
† Tournament winner As of March 22, 2016; Rankings from AP poll

The 2015–16 Loyola Marymount Lions women's basketball team represented Loyola Marymount University in the 2015–16 college basketball season. The Lions are members of the West Coast Conference, were led by head coach Charity Elliott, in her fourth season at the school. The Lions played their home games at the Gersten Pavilion on the university campus in Los Angeles, California. They finished the season 11–20, 6–12 in WCC play to finish in a tie for seventh place. They advanced to the quarterfinals of the WCC women's tournament, where they lost to Saint Mary's.

== Roster ==
2015–16 Loyola Marymount Lions women's basketball team
Players
Coaches

| Pos. | # | Name | Height | Year | Previous school | Hometown |
|---|---|---|---|---|---|---|
| G | 1 | Bianca Velasco | 5 ft 8 in (1.73 m) | Fr | Mater Dei | Santa Ana, CA |
| G | 2 | Shelbi Aimonetti | 5 ft 8 in (1.73 m) | Jr | St. Francis | Redwood City, CA |
| G | 3 | Marcella Hughes | 5 ft 5 in (1.65 m) | Fr | Carondelet | Concord, CA |
| F | 4 | Cheyanne Wallace | 6 ft 0 in (1.83 m) | Fr | Sierra Canyon | Woodland Hills, CA |
| G | 5 | Chloe Hall | 6 ft 0 in (1.83 m) | So | North Toronto Collegiate Institute | Toronto, Canada |
| G | 11 | Andee Velasco | 5 ft 8 in (1.73 m) | Fr | Mater Dei | Santa Ana, CA |
| G | 13 | Deanna Johnson | 5 ft 7 in (1.7 m) | RS Jr | Norco | Corona, CA |
| G/F | 20 | Sophie Taylor | 6 ft 0 in (1.83 m) | So | Acalanes | Lafayette, CA |
| G | 21 | Taylor Anderson | 6 ft 0 in (1.83 m) | Sr | Bonita | La Verne, CA |
| G | 22 | Deshka Olson | 5 ft 8 in (1.73 m) | So | Salmon | Salmon, ID |
| G | 23 | Leslie Lopez-Wood | 5 ft 9 in (1.75 m) | Sr | Bishop Alemany | North Hollywood, CA |
| F | 24 | Bree Alford | 6 ft 0 in (1.83 m) | So | Miramonte | Walnut Creek, CA |
| F | 30 | NK Ilang | 6 ft 0 in (1.83 m) | RS Fr | St. Anne's-Belfield | Ebonyi State, Nigeria |
| G | 32 | Makenzie Cast | 5 ft 9 in (1.75 m) | So | Carondelet | Antioch, CA |
| F | 43 | Jackie Johnson | 6 ft 2 in (1.88 m) | Sr | Eden Prairie HS; Minnesota | Eden Prairie, MN |

Head coach

- Charity Elliott (Missouri State)

Assistant coach(es)

- April Phillips (Xavier)
- Chris Elliott (Missouri State)
- Kiva Herman (San Diego)

Legend

- (C) Team captain
- (S) Suspended
- (I) Ineligible
- (W) Walk-on
- Injured
- Current redshirt

Roster

== Schedule ==
| Date time, TV | Rank^{#} | Opponent^{#} | Result | Record | Site (attendance) city, state |
Exhibition
| 11/03/2015*; 7:00 pm | | Cal State Dominguez | W 64–59 | | Gersten Pavilion; Los Angeles, CA |
| 11/09/2015*; 7:00 pm | | Bethesda University | W 101–81 | | Gersten Pavilion (175); Los Angeles, CA |
Non-conference regular season
| 11/14/2015*; 1:00 pm | | at Colorado | L 81–92 | 0–1 | Coors Events Center (2,432); Boulder, CO |
| 11/17/2015*; 7:00 pm, TheW.tv | | Cal State Fullerton | L 73–75 | 0–2 | Gersten Pavilion (175); Los Angeles, CA |
| 11/20/2015*; 9:00 pm, Oc 16 | | at Hawaiʻi; Hawai`i Rainbow Wahine Classic | L 51–65 | 0–3 | Stan Sheriff Center (2,088); Honolulu, HI |
| 11/22/2015*; 4:30 pm | | vs. Nevada; Hawai`i Rainbow Wahine Classic | W 69–58 | 1–3 | Stan Sheriff Center; Honolulu, HI |
| 11/27/2015*; 3:30 pm, TheW.tv | | Seattle; DoubleTree LA Thanksgiving Classic semifinals | L 69–78 | 1–4 | Gersten Pavilion (523); Los Angeles, CA |
| 11/28/2015*; 1:00 pm, TheW.tv | | UC Irvine; DoubleTree LA Thanksgiving Classic 3rd place game | W 95–50 | 2–4 | Gersten Pavilion (395); Los Angeles, CA |
| 12/01/2015*; 7:00 pm | | at UC Riverside | L 62–80 | 2–5 | UC Riverside Student Recreation Center (215); Riverside, CA |
| 12/04/2015*; 7:00 pm | | at UC Santa Barbara | W 70–63 | 3–5 | The Thunderdome (351); Santa Barbara, CA |
| 12/07/2015*; 5:00 pm, SEC+ | | at Missouri | L 48–80 | 3–6 | Mizzou Arena (3,832); Columbia, MO |
| 12/10/2015*; 12:00 pm, TheW.tv | | San Diego State | W 92–65 | 4–6 | Gersten Pavilion (610); Los Angeles, CA |
| 12/12/2015*; 2:00 pm | | at Cal Poly | L 58–70 | 4–7 | Mott Athletic Center (249); San Luis Obispo, CA |
| 12/19/2015*; 2:00 pm, TheW.tv | | Bristol University | W 83–32 | N/A | Gersten Pavilion (276); Los Angeles, CA |
WCC regular season
| 12/21/2015; 7:00 pm, TheW.tv | | Portland | W 62–52 | 5–7 (1–0) | Gersten Pavilion (312); Los Angeles, CA |
| 12/23/2015; 1:00 pm, TheW.tv | | Gonzaga | L 59–66 | 5–8 (1–1) | Gersten Pavilion (401); Los Angeles, CA |
| 01/02/2016; 2:00 pm, TheW.tv | | Pepperdine | W 79–69 | 6–8 (2–1) | Gersten Pavilion (391); Los Angeles, CA |
| 01/07/2016; 6:30 pm, TheW.tv | | at Saint Mary's | L 57–72 | 6–9 (2–2) | McKeon Pavilion (619); Moraga, CA |
| 01/09/2016; 2:00 pm, TheW.tv | | at Pacific | W 63–60 | 7–9 (3–2) | Alex G. Spanos Center (442); Stockton, CA |
| 01/14/2016; 7:00 pm, TheW.tv | | San Francisco | L 73–75 ^{OT} | 7–10 (3–3) | Gersten Pavilion (453); Los Angeles, CA |
| 01/16/2016; 2:00 pm, TheW.tv | | Santa Clara | L 56–57 | 7–11 (3–4) | Gersten Pavilion (523); Los Angeles, CA |
| 01/21/2016; 6:00 pm, BYUtv | | at BYU | L 61–75 | 7–12 (3–5) | Marriott Center (625); Provo, UT |
| 01/23/2016; 2:00 pm, TheW.tv | | at San Diego | L 58–82 | 7–13 (3–6) | Jenny Craig Pavilion (411); San Diego, CA |
| 01/28/2016; 7:00 pm, TheW.tv | | BYU | L 75–82 | 7–14 (3–7) | Gersten Pavilion (351); Los Angeles, CA |
| 01/30/2016; 2:00 pm, TheW.tv | | San Diego | L 67–75 | 7–15 (3–8) | Gersten Pavilion (418); Los Angeles, CA |
| 02/04/2016; 6:00 pm, TheW.tv | | at Gonzaga | L 68–83 | 7–16 (3–9) | McCarthey Athletic Center (5,127); Spokane, WA |
| 02/06/2016; 2:00 pm, TheW.tv | | at Portland | W 77–62 | 8–16 (4–9) | Chiles Center (217); Portland, OR |
| 02/11/2016; 7:00 pm, TheW.tv | | Pacific | W 96–88 ^{2OT} | 9–16 (5–9) | Gersten Pavilion (316); Los Angeles, CA |
| 02/13/2016; 2:00 pm, TheW.tv | | Saint Mary's | L 81–91 | 9–17 (5–10) | Gersten Pavilion (441); Los Angeles, CA |
| 02/18/2016; 6:00 pm, TheW.tv | | at Santa Clara | L 41–68 | 9–18 (5–11) | Leavey Center (250); Santa Clara, CA |
| 02/20/2016; 2:00 pm, TheW.tv | | at San Francisco | L 72–81 | 9–19 (5–12) | War Memorial Gymnasium (512); San Francisco, CA |
| 02/27/2016; 1:00 pm, TheW.tv | | at Pepperdine | W 83–77 | 10–19 (6–12) | Firestone Fieldhouse (214); Malibu, CA |
WCC Women's Tournament
| 03/03/2016; 12:00 pm, BYUtv | | vs. Portland; First Round | W 85–72 | 11–19 | Orleans Arena (6,071); Las Vegas, NV |
| 03/04/2016; 2:00 pm, BYUtv | | vs. Saint Mary's; Quarterfinals | L 71–85 | 11–20 | Orleans Arena (6,261); Las Vegas, NV |
*Non-conference game. ^{#}Rankings from AP Poll. (#) Tournament seedings in parentheses.

== See also ==
- Loyola Marymount Lions women's basketball
- 2015–16 Loyola Marymount Lions men's basketball team
