= 2015–16 Pepperdine Waves women's basketball team =

Intercollegiate basketball season

2015–16 Pepperdine Waves women's basketball
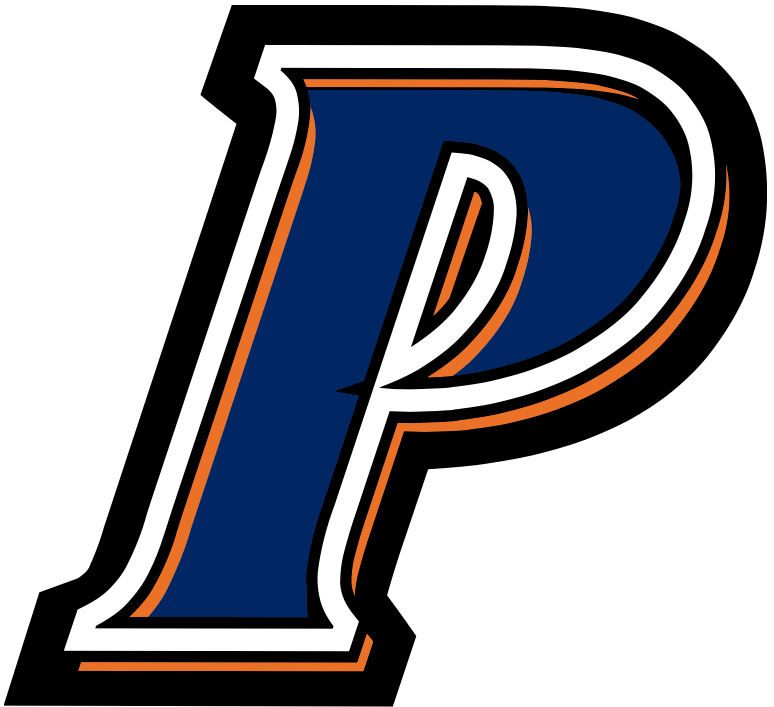
- Conference: West Coast Conference
- Record: 7–24 (2–16 WCC)
- Head coach: Ryan Weisenberg (3rd season)
- Assistant coaches: Josh Pace; Lacey Burns; Darron Larsen
- Home arena: Firestone Fieldhouse

2015–16 West Coast Conference women's basketball standings
	Conf.				Overall
Team	W		L	PCT	W		L	PCT
BYU	16	–	2	.889	26	–	7	.788
Saint Mary's	14	–	4	.778	24	–	8	.750
San Diego	13	–	5	.722	24	–	8	.750
Santa Clara	13	–	5	.722	23	–	9	.719
Gonzaga	10	–	8	.556	19	–	14	.576
San Francisco †	9	–	9	.500	21	–	12	.636
Pacific	6	–	12	.333	13	–	17	.433
Loyola Marymount	6	–	12	.333	11	–	20	.355
Pepperdine	2	–	16	.111	7	–	24	.226
Portland	1	–	17	.056	3	–	27	.100
† Tournament winner As of March 22, 2016; Rankings from AP poll

The 2015–16 Pepperdine Waves women's basketball team represented Pepperdine University in the 2015–16 college basketball season. The Waves, members of the West Coast Conference, were led by third year coach Ryan Weisenberg. The Waves played their home games at the Firestone Fieldhouse on the university campus in Malibu, California. They finished the season 7–24, 2–16 in WCC play to finish in ninth place. They lost in the first round of the WCC women's tournament to Loyola Marymount.

== Roster ==
2015–16 Pepperdine Waves women's basketball team
Players
Coaches

Pos.	#	Name	Height	Year	Previous school	Hometown
G	1	Sydney Bordanaro	5 ft 7 in (1.7 m)	Fr	Burrell	Pittsburgh, PA
G	2	Whitney Williams	5 ft 8 in (1.73 m)	Jr	El Toro	Lake Forest, CA
G	3	Kim Jacobs	5 ft 10 in (1.78 m)	So	Agoura	Agoura Hills, CA
C	5	Megan House	6 ft 4 in (1.93 m)	Fr	Serra	Oceanside, CA
G	10	Paige Fescke	5 ft 4 in (1.63 m)	Fr	Chaminade	Studio City, CA
G	13	Erica Ogwumike	5 ft 9 in (1.75 m)	Fr	Cypress Woods	Cypress, TX
C	14	Devin Stanback	6 ft 3 in (1.91 m)	So	Chaminade HS	West Hills, CA
G	15	Keyari Sleezer	5 ft 11 in (1.8 m)	Fr	South Medford	Medford, OR
G	21	Kayla Blair	5 ft 9 in (1.75 m)	Fr	Vanden HS	Fairfield, CA
G	22	Allie Green	5 ft 10 in (1.78 m)	Jr	Sacramento Charter	Sacramento, CA
F	24	Krista Pettepier	6 ft 2 in (1.88 m)	RS Jr	Ankeny; Iowa	Ankeny, IA
F	25	Yasmine Robinson-Bacote	5 ft 11 in (1.8 m)	Fr	Hillside	Hillside, NJ
F	30	Olivia Ogwumike	5 ft 11 in (1.8 m)	So	Cypress Woods	Cypress, TX
F	44	Kelsey Brockway	6 ft 1 in (1.85 m)	Sr	Palos Verdes	Rolling Hills, CA
G/F	51	Keitra Wallace	5 ft 11 in (1.8 m)	Sr	Brea Olinda	Brea, CA

Head coach

- Ryan Weisenberg (Cal Poly)

Assistant coach(es)

- Josh Pace (Syracuse)
- Lacey Burns (Vanguard)
- Darron Larsen (Massey)

Legend

- (C) Team captain
- (S) Suspended
- (I) Ineligible
- (W) Walk-on
- Injured
- Current redshirt

Roster

== Schedule ==
Date time, TV	Rank^{#}	Opponent^{#}	Result	Record	Site (attendance) city, state
Exhibition
10/31/2015*; 12:00 pm		Bristol University	W 91–43		Firestone Fieldhouse (211); Malibu, CA
11/06/2015*; 7:00 pm		Bethesda Christian	W 110–72		Firestone Fieldhouse; Malibu, CA
Non-conference regular season
11/13/2015*; 4:00 pm, PLN		at Army West Point	L 53–63	0–1	Christl Arena (993); West Point, NY
11/15/2015*; 10:00 am		at Albany	L 49–64	0–2	SECU Arena (863); Albany, NY
11/17/2015*; 7:00 pm, MW Net		at UNLV	L 63–83	0–3	Cox Pavilion (743); Paradise, NV
11/20/2015*; 7:00 pm, TheW.tv		Cal State Fullerton	W 81–75	1–3	Firestone Fieldhouse (237); Malibu, CA
11/24/2015*; 9:00 pm, GCI		at Alaska Anchorage; Great Alaska Shootout semifinals	L 61–94	1–4	Alaska Airlines Center (2,447); Anchorage, AK
11/25/2015*; 3:30 pm, GCI		vs. George Mason; Great Alaska Shootout 3rd place game	L 63–71	1–5	Alaska Airlines Center (2,220); Anchorage, AK
11/29/2015*; 1:00 pm, TheW.tv		UC Santa Barbara	W 71–69	2–5	Firestone Fieldhouse; Malibu, CA
12/02/2015*; 5:00 pm, TheW.tv		Cal Poly	L 47–61	2–6	Firestone Fieldhouse (211); Malibu, CA
12/05/2015*; 1:00 pm, TheW.tv		Denver	W 64–60	3–6	Firestone Fieldhouse (312); Malibu, CA
12/08/2015*; 7:00 pm		at Cal State Bakersfield	W 76–73	4–6	Icardo Center (502); Bakersfield, CA
12/12/2015*; 1:00 pm, MW Net		at New Mexico	L 52–60	4–7	The Pit (5,135); Albuquerque, NM
WCC regular season
12/21/2015; 7:00 pm, TheW.tv		Gonzaga	L 57–74	4–8 (0–1)	Firestone Fieldhouse (201); Malibu, CA
12/23/2015; 2:00 pm, TheW.tv		Portland	W 74–62	5–8 (1–1)	Firestone Fieldhouse (187); Malibu, CA
01/02/2016; 2:00 pm, TheW.tv		at Loyola Marymount	L 69–79	5–9 (1–2)	Gersten Pavilion (391); Los Angeles, CA
01/07/2016; 7:00 pm, TheW.tv		at Pacific	L 62–65	5–10 (1–3)	Alex G. Spanos Center (434); Stockton, CA
01/09/2016; 1:00 pm, TheW.tv		at Saint Mary's	L 72–88	5–11 (1–4)	McKeon Pavilion (404); Moraga, CA
01/14/2016; 7:00 pm, TheW.tv		Santa Clara	L 60–62	5–12 (1–5)	Firestone Fieldhouse (217); Malibu, CA
01/16/2016; 1:00 pm, TheW.tv		San Francisco	L 74–81	5–13 (1–6)	Firestone Fieldhouse (189); Malibu, CA
01/21/2016; 6:00 pm, TheW.tv		at San Diego	L 55–74	5–14 (1–7)	Jenny Craig Pavilion (411); San Diego, CA
01/23/2016; 1:00 pm, BYUtv		at BYU	L 64–69	5–15 (1–8)	Marriott Center (1,271); Provo, UT
01/28/2016; 7:00 pm, TheW.tv		San Diego	L 55–70	5–16 (1–9)	Firestone Fieldhouse (183); Malibu, CA
01/30/2016; 1:00 pm, TheW.tv		BYU	L 66–77	5–17 (1–10)	Firestone Fieldhouse (208); Malibu, CA
02/04/2016; 7:00 pm, TheW.tv		at Portland	L 79–81	5–18 (1–11)	Chiles Center (230); Portland, OR
02/06/2016; 2:00 pm, TheW.tv		at Gonzaga	L 39–56	5–19 (1–12)	McCarthey Athletic Center (6,000); Spokane, WA
02/11/2016; 7:00 pm, TheW.tv		Saint Mary's	W 62–58	6–19 (2–12)	Firestone Fieldhouse (195); Malibu, CA
02/13/2016; 1:00 pm, TheW.tv		Pacific	L 64–92	6–20 (2–13)	Firestone Fieldhouse (233); Malibu, CA
02/18/2016; 7:00 pm, TheW.tv		at San Francisco	L 75–99	6–21 (2–14)	War Memorial Gymnasium (297); San Francisco, CA
02/20/2016; 2:00 pm, TheW.tv		at Santa Clara	L 50–84	6–22 (2–15)	Leavey Center (250); Santa Clara, CA
02/27/2015; 1:00 pm, TheW.tv		Loyola Marymount	L 77–83	6–23 (2–16)	Firestone Fieldhouse (214); Malibu, CA
WCC Women's Tournament
03/03/2016; 12:00 pm, BYUtv		vs. Loyola Marymount; First Round	W 81–72	7–23	Orleans Arena; Paradise, NV
03/04/2016; 12:00 pm, BYUtv		vs. BYU; Quarterfinals	L 59–72	7–24	Orleans Arena; Paradise, NV
*Non-conference game. ^{#}Rankings from AP Poll. (#) Tournament seedings in parentheses. All times are in Pacific Time.

== See also ==
- 2015–16 Pepperdine Waves men's basketball team
