= 2015–16 Portland Pilots women's basketball team =

Intercollegiate basketball season

2015–16 Portland Pilots women's basketball
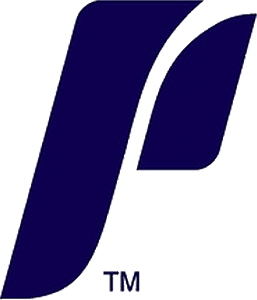
- Conference: West Coast Conference
- Record: 3–27 (1–17 WCC)
- Head coach: Cheryl Sorenson (2nd season)
- Assistant coaches: Steve Lowe; Brianna Chambers; Megan Osmer
- Home arena: Chiles Center

2015–16 West Coast Conference women's basketball standings
	Conf.				Overall
Team	W		L	PCT	W		L	PCT
BYU	16	–	2	.889	26	–	7	.788
Saint Mary's	14	–	4	.778	24	–	8	.750
San Diego	13	–	5	.722	24	–	8	.750
Santa Clara	13	–	5	.722	23	–	9	.719
Gonzaga	10	–	8	.556	19	–	14	.576
San Francisco †	9	–	9	.500	21	–	12	.636
Pacific	6	–	12	.333	13	–	17	.433
Loyola Marymount	6	–	12	.333	11	–	20	.355
Pepperdine	2	–	16	.111	7	–	24	.226
Portland	1	–	17	.056	3	–	27	.100
† Tournament winner As of March 22, 2016; Rankings from AP poll

The 2015–16 Portland Pilots women's basketball team represented the University of Portland in the 2015–16 NCAA Division I women's basketball season college basketball season. The Pilots, led by second year coach Cheryl Sorensen. They played their homes games at Chiles Center and were members of the West Coast Conference. They finished the season 3–27, 1–17 in WCC play to finish in last place. They lost in the first round of the WCC women's tournament to Loyola Marymount.

== Roster ==
2015–16 Portland Pilots women's basketball team
Players
Coaches

Pos.	#	Name	Height	Year	Previous school	Hometown
G	3	Kaylie Van Loo	5 ft 9 in (1.75 m)	Jr	Glencoe HS	Hillsboro, OR
G	10	Holly Blades	5 ft 11 in (1.8 m)	Jr	Meridian HS; College of Southern Idaho	Median, ID
F	11	Sara Ines Hernandez	6 ft 1 in (1.85 m)	Sr	Liceo Scientifico Nomentano	Rome, Italy
G	14	Corissa Turley	6 ft 0 in (1.83 m)	Jr	Redwood HS; College of the Sequoias	Visalia, CA
G	15	Madison Ward	5 ft 10 in (1.78 m)	So	Mullen HS	Golden, CO
G	20	Hannah Mattson	5 ft 9 in (1.75 m)	Jr	West Valley HS	Fairbanks, AK
G/F	22	Ellie Woerner	6 ft 0 in (1.83 m)	Fr	Eastlake HS	Sammamish, WA
F	23	Julie Spencer	6 ft 2 in (1.88 m)	Fr	W.F. West HS	Chehalis, WA
G	24	Rachelle Owens	5 ft 7 in (1.7 m)	Jr	Carson HS; College of Southern Idaho	Carson, CA
G	32	Darian Slaga	5 ft 8 in (1.73 m)	Fr	Boulder Creek HS	Prescott Valley, AZ
F	33	Ashley Gray	6 ft 1 in (1.85 m)	So	West Valley HS	Yakima, WA
C	35	Sara Zaragoza	6 ft 4 in (1.93 m)	So	Instituto Veritas	Madrid, Spain

Head coach

- Cheryl Sorenson (Washington)

Assistant coach(es)

- Steve Lowe (Central Washington)
- Brianna Chambers (Cal State Bakersfield)
- Jazmine Foreman (Lynn)

Legend

- (C) Team captain
- (S) Suspended
- (I) Ineligible
- (W) Walk-on
- Injured
- Current redshirt

Roster

== Schedule and results ==
Date time, TV	Rank^{#}	Opponent^{#}	Result	Record	Site (attendance) city, state
Exhibition
11/06/2015*; 7:00 pm		Warner Pacific	W 70–67		Chiles Center (313); Portland, OR
Non-conference regular season
11/14/2015*; 5:00 pm, TheW.tv		Willamette	W 73–54	1–0	Chiles Center (327); Portland, OR
11/16/2015*; 7:00 pm, TheW.tv		No. 9 Oregon State	L 50–94	1–1	Chiles Center (903); Portland, OR
11/20/2015*; 4:30 pm		at Montana State	L 57–86	1–2	Worthington Arena (1,192); Bozeman, MT
11/22/2015*; 12:00 pm		at Montana	L 67–90	1–3	Dahlberg Arena (2,372); Missoula, MT
11/24/2015*; 7:00 pm		at Portland State	W 69–53	2–3	Peter Stott Center (225); Portland, OR
11/27/2015*; 4:00 pm, TheW.tv		Weber State	L 55–57	2–4	Chiles Center (301); Portland, OR
11/29/2015*; 2:00 pm, TheW.tv		UC Davis	L 47–72	2–5	Chiles Center (324); Portland, OR
12/02/2015*; 7:00 pm		at Washington	L 65–83	2–6	Alaska Airlines Arena (1,173); Seattle, WA
12/06/2015*; 2:00 pm, CSNNW		Boise State	L 49–89	2–7	Chiles Center (349); Portland, OR
12/12/2015*; 2:00 pm		at Oregon	L 52–93	2–8	Matthew Knight Arena (1,737); Eugene, OR
12/18/2015*; 2:00 pm, TheW.tv		Cal State Northridge	L 62–68	2–9	Chiles Center (265); Portland, OR
WCC regular season
12/21/2015; 7:00 pm, TheW.tv		at Loyola Marymount	L 52–62	2–10 (0–1)	Gersten Pavilion (312); Los Angeles, CA
12/23/2015; 2:00 pm, TheW.tv		at Pepperdine	L 62–74	2–11 (0–2)	Firestone Fieldhouse (187); Malibu, CA
12/31/2015; 4:00 pm, TheW.tv		Santa Clara	L 45–67	2–12 (0–3)	Chiles Center (291); Portland, OR
01/02/2016; 2:00 pm, TheW.tv		San Francisco	L 63–82	2–13 (0–4)	Chiles Center (274); Portland, OR
01/09/2016; 2:00 pm, TheW.tv		Gonzaga	L 63–71	2–14 (0–5)	Chiles Center (395); Portland, OR
01/14/2016; 6:00 pm, TheW.tv		at San Diego	L 43–71	2–15 (0–6)	Jenny Craig Pavilion (321); San Diego, CA
01/16/2016; 1:00 pm, BYUtv		at BYU	L 66–78	2–16 (0–7)	Marriott Center (882); Provo, UT
01/21/2016; 7:00 pm, TheW.tv		Pacific	L 64–72	2–17 (0–8)	Chiles Center (240); Portland, OR
01/23/2016; 1:00 pm, CSNNW		Saint Mary's	L 51–78	2–18 (0–9)	Chiles Center (361); Portland, OR
01/28/2016; 7:00 pm, TheW.tv		at San Francisco	L 69–90	2–19 (0–10)	War Memorial Gymnasium (279); San Francisco, CA
01/30/2015; 2:00 pm, TheW.tv		at Santa Clara	L 47–66	2–20 (0–11)	Leavey Center (301); Santa Clara, CA
02/04/2015; 7:00 pm, TheW.tv		Pepperdine	W 81–79	3–20 (1–11)	Chiles Center (230); Portland, OR
02/06/2015; 2:00 pm, TheW.tv		Loyola Marymount	L 62–77	3–21 (1–12)	Chiles Center (217); Portland, OR
02/13/2016; 2:00 pm, TheW.tv		at Gonzaga	L 51–86	3–22 (1–13)	McCarthey Athletic Center (5,559); Spokane, WA
02/18/2016; 7:00 pm, TheW.tv		at Pacific	L 38–87	3–23 (1–14)	Alex G. Spanos Center (441); Stockton, CA
02/20/2016; 1:00 pm, TheW.tv		at Saint Mary's	L 53–95	3–24 (1–15)	McKeon Pavilion (419); Moraga, CA
02/25/2016; 7:00 pm, TheW.tv		BYU	L 59–84	3–25 (1–16)	Chiles Center (334); Portland, OR
02/27/2016; 2:00 pm, CSNNW		San Diego	L 67–77	3–26 (1–17)	Chiles Center (389); Portland, OR
WCC Women's Tournament
03/03/2016; 2:00 pm, BYUtv		vs. Loyola Marymount; First Round	L 72–85	3–27	Orleans Arena (6,071); Las Vegas, NV
*Non-conference game. ^{#}Rankings from AP Poll. (#) Tournament seedings in parentheses. All times are in Pacific Time.

== See also ==
- 2015–16 Portland Pilots men's basketball team
- Portland Pilots women's basketball
