= 2015–16 West Coast Conference women's basketball season =

- League: NCAA Division I
- Sport: Women's basketball
- Teams: 10
- TV partner(s): National: ESPNU, BYUtv, TheW.tv; Regional: SWX, CSNNW

Regular season
- Season champions: BYU
- Season MVP: Lexi Rydalch, BYU

Tournament

Basketball seasons
- ← 14–15 16–17 →

2015–16 West Coast Conference women's basketball standings
	Conf.				Overall
Team	W		L	PCT	W		L	PCT
BYU	16	–	2	.889	26	–	7	.788
Saint Mary's	14	–	4	.778	24	–	8	.750
San Diego	13	–	5	.722	24	–	8	.750
Santa Clara	13	–	5	.722	23	–	9	.719
Gonzaga	10	–	8	.556	19	–	14	.576
San Francisco †	9	–	9	.500	21	–	12	.636
Pacific	6	–	12	.333	13	–	17	.433
Loyola Marymount	6	–	12	.333	11	–	20	.355
Pepperdine	2	–	16	.111	7	–	24	.226
Portland	1	–	17	.056	3	–	27	.100
† Tournament winner As of March 22, 2016; Rankings from AP poll

The 2015–16 West Coast Conference women's basketball season began with practices in October 2015 and ended with the 2016 West Coast Conference women's basketball tournament at the Orleans Arena March 3–8, 2016 in Paradise, Nevada. The regular season started in November, with the conference schedule starting at the end of December.

This was the 31st season for WCC women's basketball, which began in the 1985–86 season when the league was known as the West Coast Athletic Conference (WCAC). It was also the 27th season under the West Coast Conference name (the conference began as the California Basketball Association in 1952, became the WCAC in 1956, and dropped the word "Athletic" in 1989).

== Pre-season ==
- Pre-season media day took place in October at the Time Warner Cable SportsNet and Time Warner Cable Deportes Studios. Video interviews will be hosted on the WCC's streaming video outlet, TheW.tv, beginning at 11:30 AM PDT. Jeff Lampe of WCC Live interviewed each coach and got a preview of their respective season. The regional television schedule announcement, the Pre-season Conference team, and the pre-season coaches rankings were some of the additional events that took place.

=== 2015–16 West Coast Women's Basketball Media Poll ===
Rank, School (first-place votes), Points
1. Gonzaga (6), 78
2. BYU (4), 76
3. Saint Mary's, 61
4. San Diego, 58
5. San Francisco, 51
6. Pacific, 40
7. Santa Clara, 30
8. Loyola Marymount, 25
9. Pepperdine, 20
10. Portland, 11

=== 2015–16 West Coast Women's Preseason All-West Conference Team ===
Player, School, Yr., Pos.
Kylie Maeda, BYU, Sr., G
Lexi Eaton Rydalch, BYU, Sr., F
Shelby Cheslek, Gonzaga, Sr., C
Ellie Tinkle, Gonzaga, Sr., G
Sophie Taylor, Loyola Marymount, Sr., F
Hailie Eackles, Pacific, Sr., G
Shannon Mauldin, Saint Mary's, Sr., G
Lauren Nicholson, Saint Mary's, Sr., G
Malina Hood, San Diego, Sr., F
Taylor Proctor, San Francisco, Sr., F

=== College Sports Madness Preseason All-West Conference Team ===
- Coach of the Year- Lisa Fortier, Gonzaga
- Player of the Year- Lexi Rydalch, BYU
- Freshman of the Year- Andee Velsaco, Loyola Marymount

First Team

- Lexi Rydalch, G, BYU
- Lauren Nicholson, G, Saint Mary's
- Malina Hood, G, San Diego
- Elle Tinkle, G/F, Gonzaga
- Taylor Proctor, F/C, San Francisco

Second Team

- Hailie Eackles, G, Pacific
- Shannon Mauldin, G, Saint Mary's
- Zhane Dikes, G, San Francisco
- Leslie Lopez-Wood, G/F, Loyola Marymount
- Shelby Cheslek, F/C, Gonzaga

== Rankings ==
The AP Poll does not do a post-season rankings. As a result, their last rankings are Week 19. The Coaches Poll does a post-season poll and the end of the NCAA Tournament.

Legend
	Improvement in ranking
	Drop in ranking
RV	Received votes but were not ranked in Top 25 of poll

		Pre/ Wk 1	Wk 2	Wk 3	Wk 4	Wk 5	Wk 6	Wk 7	Wk 8	Wk 9	Wk 10	Wk 11	Wk 12	Wk 13	Wk 14	Wk 15	Wk 16	Wk 17	Wk 18	Wk 19	Post
BYU	AP						RV					RV	RV	RV	RV	RV	RV	RV			
BYU	C	RV	RV				RV	RV	RV			RV	RV	RV	RV	RV	22	RV			
Gonzaga	AP	RV																			
Gonzaga	C	RV	RV	RV																	
Loyola Marymount	AP																				
Loyola Marymount	C																				
Pacific	AP																				
Pacific	C																				
Pepperdine	AP																				
Pepperdine	C																				
Portland	AP																				
Portland	C																				
Saint Mary's	AP																				
Saint Mary's	C																				
San Diego	AP											RV	RV	RV							
San Diego	C												RV	RV	RV						
San Francisco	AP																				
San Francisco	C																				
Santa Clara	AP																				
Santa Clara	C																				

== Non-Conference games ==
BYU defeated #12/11 Texas A&M 72–64 to win the Tom Weston Invitational.

== Conference games ==
=== Composite Matrix ===
This table summarizes the head-to-head results between teams in conference play.

	BYU	Gonzaga	LMU	Pacific	Pepperdine	Portland	Saint Mary's	San Diego	San Francisco	Santa Clara
vs. Brigham Young	-	1–1	0–2	0–2	0–2	0–2	0–2	1–1	0–2	0–2
vs. Gonzaga	1–1	–	0–2	1–1	0–2	0–2	2–0	2–0	1–1	1–1
vs. Loyola Marymount	2–0	2–0	–	0–2	0–2	0–2	2–0	2–0	2–0	2–0
vs. Pacific	2–0	1–1	2–0	-	0–2	0–2	2–0	2–0	1–1	2–0
vs. Pepperdine	2–0	2–0	1–1	2–0	-	1–1	1–1	2–0	2–0	2–0
vs. Portland	2–0	2–0	2–0	2–0	1–1	-	2–0	2–0	2–0	2–0
vs. Saint Mary's	2–0	0–2	0–2	0–2	1–1	0–2	-	0–2	0–2	1–1
vs. San Diego	1–1	0–2	0–2	0–2	0–2	0–2	2–0	-	1–1	1–1
vs. San Francisco	2–0	1–1	0–2	1–1	0–2	0–2	2–0	1–1	-	2–0
vs. Santa Clara	2–0	1–1	0–2	1–1	0–2	0–2	1–1	1–1	0–2	-
Total	16–2	10–8	6–12	6–12	2–16	1–17	14–4	13–5	9–9	13–5

== Conference tournament ==
- March 3–8, 2016– West Coast Conference Basketball Tournament, Orleans Arena, Paradise, Nevada.

First round
8	Pacific	72
9	Pepperdine	81
7	Loyola Marymount	85
10	Portland	72

Quarterfinals
1	BYU	72
9	Pepperdine	59
4	Santa Clara	59
5	Gonzaga	58
2	Saint Mary's	85
7	Loyola Marymount	71
3	San Diego	80
6	San Francisco	84^{OT}

Semifinals
1	BYU	87
4	Santa Clara	67
2	Saint Mary's	65
6	San Francisco	67

Championship
1	BYU
6	San Francisco

== Head coaches ==
The 2015–16 season sees one new face in the WCC. Lynne Roberts left Pacific to become the new head coach at Utah.

Jeff Judkins, BYU
Lisa Mispley Fortier, Gonzaga
Charity Elliott, Loyola Marymount
Bradley Davis, Pacific
Ryan Weisenberg, Pepperdine
Cheryl Sorensen, Portland
Paul Thomas, Saint Mary's
Cindy Fisher, San Diego
Jennifer Azzi, San Francisco
JR Payne, Santa Clara

== Postseason ==
=== NCAA tournament ===
Seed	Bracket	School	First round	Second round	Sweet 16	Elite 8	Final Four	Championship
# Bids	W-L (%):	TOTAL: 0–0 –	0–0 –	0–0 –	0–0 –	0–0 –	0–0 –	0–0 –

=== WNIT ===
School	First round	Second round	Third round	Quarterfinals	Semifinals	Championship
# Bids; W-L (%); TOTAL: 0–0 –	0–0 –	0–0 –	0–0 –	0–0 –	0–0 –	0–0 –

== Awards and honors ==
=== WCC Player-of-the-Week ===
The WCC player of the week awards are given each Monday.

- Nov. 16- Sydney Raggio, F, Saint Mary's
- Nov. 30- GeAnna Luaulu-Summers, G, Pacific & Morgan McGwire, F, Santa Clara
- Dec. 14- Lexi Rydalch, G, BYU
- Dec. 28- Maya Hood, F, San Diego
- Jan. 11- Kalani Purcell, F, BYU
- Jan. 25- Kalani Purcell, F, BYU
- Feb. 8- Lexi Rydalch, G, BYU
- Feb. 22- Marie Bertholdt, F, Santa Clara
- Nov. 23- Malina Hood, G, San Diego
- Dec. 7- Lauren Nicholson, G, Saint Mary's
- Dec. 21- Ameela Li, G, Pacific
- Jan. 4- Georgia Stirton, Gonzaga
- Jan. 18- Kalani Purcell, F, BYU
- Feb. 1- Lexi Rydalch, G, BYU
- Feb. 15- Taylor Proctor, F, San Francisco
- Feb. 29- Lauren Nicholson, G, Saint Mary's

=== College Madness West Coast Player of the Week ===
College Madness WCC player of the Week Awards are given every Sunday.

- Nov. 15- Maya Hood, F, San Diego
- Nov. 29- Morgan McGwire, F, Santa Clara (also High Major Player of the Week)
- Dec. 13- Malina Hood, F, San Diego (also High Major Player of the Week)
- Dec. 27- Lori Parkinson, F, Santa Clara
- Jan. 10- Lexi Rydalch, G, BYU
- Jan. 24- Malina Hood, G, San Diego
- Feb. 7- Lexi Rydalch, G, BYU
- Feb. 21- Marie Bertholdt, F, Santa Clara
- Nov. 22- Malina Hood, F, San Diego
- Dec. 6- Taylor Proctor, F, San Francisco
- Dec. 20- Lauren Nicholson, G, Saint Mary's
- Jan. 3- Lexi Rydalch, G, BYU
- Jan. 17- Lexi Rydalch, G, BYU
- Jan. 31- Lexi Rydalch, G, BYU (also High Major Player of the Week)
- Feb. 14- Erica Ogwumike, G, Pepperdine
- Feb. 28- Maya Hood, F, San Diego

=== All West Coast Conference teams ===
Voting was by conference coaches:

- Player of The Year: Lexi Rydalch, BYU
- Newcomer of The Year: Kalani Purcell, BYU
- Defensive Player of The Year: Maya Hood, San Diego
- Coach of The Year: Jeff Judkins, BYU

College Sports Madness Selections

- To be posted after the WCC Tournament.

=== All-Conference First team ===
Name	School	Pos.	Year
Jill Barta	Gonzaga	F	R-Freshman
Marie Bertholdt	Santa Clara	F	Junior
Hailie Eackles	Pacific	G	Senior
Malina Hood	San Diego	G	Senior
Lauren Nicholson	Saint Mary's	G	Senior
Erica Ogwumike	Pepperdine	G	Freshman
Lori Parkinson	Santa Clara	F	Junior
Taylor Proctor	San Francisco	F	Senior
Kalani Purcell	BYU	F	Junior
Lexi Rydalch	BYU	G	Senior

College Sports Madness Selections

- To be posted after the WCC Tournament.

Name	School	Pos.	Year

=== All-Conference Second team ===
Name	School	Pos.	Year
Stella Beck	Saint Mary's	G	Sophomore
Zhane Dikes	San Francisco	G	Senior
Maya Hood	San Diego	F	Junior
Makenzi Pulsipher	BYU	G	Junior
Sophie Taylor	Loyola Marymount	F	Senior

College Sports Madness Selections
To be posted after the WCC Tournament.

Name	School	Pos.	Year

=== Honorable mention ===
Name	School
Devon Brookshire	Saint Mary's
Shelby Cheslek	Gonzaga
Desire Finnie	Pacific
Rachel Howard	San Francisco
Devin Hudson	Santa Clara
Kylie Maeda	BYU
Kaylie Van Loo	Portland

=== All-Freshman team ===
Name	School	Pos.
Jill Barta	Gonzaga	F
Savanna Hanson	Santa Clara	G
Erica Ogwumike	Pepperdine	G
Sydney Raggio	Saint Mary's	F
Cheyanne Wallace	Loyola Marymount	F

=== All-Academic team ===
Player, School	Year	GPA	Major
Stella Beck, Saint Mary's	Sophomore	3.72	Psychology
Marie Bertholdt, Santa Clara	Junior	3.26	Business
Devon Brookshire, Saint Mary's	Junior	3.70	Psychology & Business
Shelby Cheslek, Gonzaga	R-Senior	3.62	Masters of Business Administration
Rachel Howard, San Francisco	Junior	3.75	Kinesiology
Makenzi Pulsipher, BYU	Junior	3.42	Recreation Management
Lexi Rydalch, BYU	Senior	3.25	Psychology
Sophie Taylor, Loyola Marymount	Senior	3.20	Physics
Kaylie Van Loo, Portland	Junior	3.70	Marketing
Sydney Williams, San Diego	Sophomore	3.45	Behavioral Neuroscience

=== All-Academic Honorable Mention ===
Player	School
Shelbi Aimonetti	Loyola Marymount
Erin Butler	Pacific
Brooke Gallaway	Santa Clara
Kiara Kudron	Gonzaga
Lisa Janko	Saint Mary's
Kyle Maeda	BYU
Hannah Mattson	Portland
Samira McDonald	Saint Mary's
Kristine Nielsen	BYU
Shaniqua Nilles	Gonzaga
Olivia Ogwumike	Pepperdine
Lori Parkinson	Santa Clara
Krista Pettepier	Pepperdine
Michaela Rakova	San Francisco
Anna Seilund	San Francisco
Kalyn Simon	San Francisco
Devin Stanback	Pepperdine
Georgia Stirton	Gonzaga
Emma Stach	Gonzaga
Elle Tinkle	Gonzaga
Carly Turner	Saint Mary's

== See also ==
- 2015-16 NCAA Division I women's basketball season
- West Coast Conference women's basketball tournament
- 2015–16 West Coast Conference men's basketball season
- West Coast Conference men's basketball tournament
- 2016 West Coast Conference men's basketball tournament
