= 2015–16 San Diego Toreros women's basketball team =

Intercollegiate basketball season

2015–16 San Diego Toreros women's basketball

WNIT, Third round
- Conference: West Coast Conference
- Record: 25–8 (13–5 WCC)
- Head coach: Cindy Fisher (11th season)
- Assistant coaches: Mary Ann Falcosky; Niecee Nelson; Ashley Ford
- Home arena: Jenny Craig Pavilion

2015–16 West Coast Conference women's basketball standings
	Conf.				Overall
Team	W		L	PCT	W		L	PCT
BYU	16	–	2	.889	26	–	7	.788
Saint Mary's	14	–	4	.778	24	–	8	.750
San Diego	13	–	5	.722	24	–	8	.750
Santa Clara	13	–	5	.722	23	–	9	.719
Gonzaga	10	–	8	.556	19	–	14	.576
San Francisco †	9	–	9	.500	21	–	12	.636
Pacific	6	–	12	.333	13	–	17	.433
Loyola Marymount	6	–	12	.333	11	–	20	.355
Pepperdine	2	–	16	.111	7	–	24	.226
Portland	1	–	17	.056	3	–	27	.100
† Tournament winner As of March 22, 2016; Rankings from AP poll

The 2015–16 San Diego Toreros women's basketball team represented the University of San Diego in the 2015–16 college basketball season. The Toreros, members of the West Coast Conference (WCC), were led by head coach Cindy Fisher, in her eleventh season at the school. The Toreros played their home games at the Jenny Craig Pavilion on the university campus in San Diego, California. They finished the season 25–8, 13–5 in WCC play, to finish in a tie for third place. They lost in the quarterfinals of the WCC women's tournament to San Francisco. They were invited to the Women's National Invitation Tournament where they defeated Northwestern and IUPUI in the first and second rounds before losing to Michigan in the third round.

== Roster ==
2015–16 San Diego Toreros women's basketball team
Players
Coaches

Pos.	#	Name	Height	Year	Previous school	Hometown
F	0	Chynna Stevens	6 ft 0 in (1.83 m)	Fr	Clark	Clark, SD
F	2	Tayla Hepburn	6 ft 2 in (1.88 m)	Fr	St. Mary's Anglican	Perth, Australia
G	5	Aubrey Ward-El	5 ft 9 in (1.75 m)	So	Skyview	Vancouver, WA
F	11	Malina Hood	5 ft 10 in (1.78 m)	Sr	La Jolla Country Day	San Diego, CA
F	12	Alexandra Hagan	6 ft 0 in (1.83 m)	Fr	Inglemoor	Kenmore, WA
G	21	Sydney Shepard	5 ft 11 in (1.8 m)	Fr	Lake Washington	Kirkland, WA
F	22	Maya Hood	5 ft 10 in (1.78 m)	RS Jr	La Jolla Country Day	San Diego, CA
F	24	Caroline Buhr	6 ft 1 in (1.85 m)	So	Penn	Mishawaka, IN
G	25	Katherine Hamilton	5 ft 8 in (1.73 m)	Jr	Dobson	Chandler, AZ
G	32	Cori Woodward	5 ft 6 in (1.68 m)	Fr	Prairie	Vancouver, WA
G	40	Jamie Kissinger	5 ft 9 in (1.75 m)	So	Minden	Minden, NE
F	44	Sydney Williams	6 ft 1 in (1.85 m)	So	Coeur d'Alene	Coeur d'Alene, ID
F	55	Alexandria Young	6 ft 0 in (1.83 m)	RS So	Mater Dei	San Diego, CA
F		Edi Utibe	6 ft 2 in (1.88 m)	RS So	Charlotte Amalie	U.S. Virgin Islands

Head coach

- Cindy Fisher (Eastern Wyoming College)

Assistant coach(es)

- Mary Ann Falcosky (Northern Arizona)
- Niecee Nelson (Concordia)
- Ashley Ford (Nebraska)

Legend

- (C) Team captain
- (S) Suspended
- (I) Ineligible
- (W) Walk-on
- Injured
- Current redshirt

Roster
Last update: June 5, 2024

== Schedule ==
Date time, TV	Rank^{#}	Opponent^{#}	Result	Record	Site (attendance) city, state
Exhibition
11/06/2015*; 6:00 p.m., TheW.tv		San Diego Christian	W 99–37		Jenny Craig Pavilion; San Diego, CA
Non-conference regular season
11/13/2015*; 6:30 p.m., MW Net		at Nevada	W 84–47	1–0	Lawlor Events Center (1,119); Reno, NV
11/17/2015*; 6:00 p.m., TheW.tv		Cal State Northridge	W 86–64	2–0	Jenny Craig Pavilion (524); San Diego, CA
11/21/2015*; 4:00 p.m., TheW.tv		Arizona	W 59–54	3–0	Jenny Craig Pavilion (714); San Diego, CA
11/24/2015*; 7:00 p.m., Watch Big Sky		at Montana State	W 62–49	4–0	Worthington Arena (709); Bozeman, MT
11/27/2015*; 4:00 p.m., TheW.tv		Valparaiso; San Diego Central Classic	W 76–60	5–0	Jenny Craig Pavilion (618); San Diego, CA
11/28/2015*; 4:00 p.m., TheW.tv		Akron; San Diego Central Classic	W 86–65	6–0	Jenny Craig Pavilion (503); San Diego, CA
12/03/2015*; 7:00 p.m., MW Net		at San Diego State	W 60–53	7–0	Viejas Arena (370); San Diego, CA
12/06/2015*; 1:00 p.m., TheW.tv		Washington State	L 72–78	7–1	Jenny Craig Pavilion (774); San Diego, CA
12/09/2015*; 7:00 p.m., BigWest.tv		at Cal State Fullerton	W 53–44	8–1	Titan Gym (197); Fullerton, CA
12/12/2015*; 2:00 p.m., MW Net		at Fresno State	W 72–68	9–1	Save Mart Center (2,121); Fresno, CA
12/15/2015*; 5:00 p.m., TheW.tv		Hope International	W 90–52	10–1	Jenny Craig Pavilion (351); San Diego, CA
WCC regular season
12/23/2015; 1:00 p.m., TheW.tv		BYU	W 78–65	11–1 (1–0)	Jenny Craig Pavilion (1,518); San Diego, CA
12/31/2015; 4:00 p.m., TheW.tv		Pacific	W 69–56	12–1 (2–0)	Jenny Craig Pavilion (244); San Diego, CA
01/02/2016; 2:00 p.m., TheW.tv		Saint Mary's	L 68–73	12–2 (2–1)	Jenny Craig Pavilion (302); San Diego, CA
01/07/2016; 7:00 p.m., TheW.tv		at San Francisco	W 67–58 ^{OT}	13–2 (3–1)	War Memorial Gymnasium (403); San Francisco, CA
01/09/2016; 2:00 p.m., TheW.tv		at Santa Clara	W 70–58	14–2 (4–1)	Leavey Center (250); Santa Clara, CA
01/14/2016; 6:00 p.m., TheW.tv		Portland	W 71–43	15–2 (5–1)	Jenny Craig Pavilion (321); San Diego, CA
01/16/2016; 2:00 p.m., TheW.tv		Gonzaga	W 63–54	16–2 (6–1)	Jenny Craig Pavilion (652); San Diego, CA
01/21/2016; 6:00 p.m., TheW.tv		Pepperdine	W 74–55	17–2 (7–1)	Jenny Craig Pavilion (411); San Diego, CA
01/23/2016; 2:00 p.m., TheW.tv		Loyola Marymount	W 82–58	18–2 (8–1)	Jenny Craig Pavilion (411); San Diego, CA
01/28/2016; 7:00 p.m., TheW.tv		at Pepperdine	W 70–54	19–2 (9–1)	Firestone Fieldhouse (183); Malibu, CA
01/30/2016; 2:00 p.m., TheW.tv		at Loyola Marymount	W 75–67	20–2 (10–1)	Gersten Pavilion (418); Los Angeles, CA
02/04/2016; 7:00 p.m., TheW.tv		at Saint Mary's	L 60–68	20–3 (10–2)	McKeon Pavilion (330); Moraga, CA
02/06/2016; 2:00 p.m., TheW.tv		at Pacific	W 59–56	21–3 (11–2)	Alex G. Spanos Center (543); Stockton, CA
02/11/2016; 6:00 p.m., TheW.tv		Santa Clara	L 47–61	21–4 (11–3)	Jenny Craig Pavilion (607); San Diego, CA
02/13/2016; 2:00 p.m., TheW.tv		San Francisco	L 54–59	21–5 (11–4)	Jenny Craig Pavilion (604); San Diego, CA
02/18/2016; 6:00 p.m., BYUtv		at BYU	L 60–68	21–6 (11–5)	Marriott Center (2,293); Provo, UT
02/25/2016; 7:00 p.m., TheW.tv		at Gonzaga	W 58–57	22–6 (12–5)	McCarthey Athletic Center (5,630); Spokane, WA
02/27/2016; 2:00 p.m., CSNNW		at Portland	W 77–67	23–6 (13–5)	Chiles Center (389); Portland, OR
WCC women's tournament
03/03/2016; 6:00 p.m., BYUtv		vs. San Francisco; Quarterfinals	L 80–84 ^{OT}	23–7	Orleans Arena (6,071); Paradise, NV
WNIT
03/17/2016*; 5:00 p.m.		at Northwestern; First round	W 69–65	24–7	Welsh–Ryan Arena (416); Evanston, IL
03/19/2016*; 4:00 p.m.		at IUPUI; Second round	W 59–48	25–7	The Jungle (308); Indianapolis, IN
03/22/2016*; 4:00 p.m.		at Michigan; Third round	L 51–78	25–8	Crisler Center (1,000); Ann Arbor, MI
*Non-conference game. ^{#}Rankings from AP poll. (#) Tournament seedings in parentheses. All times are in Pacific.

== Rankings ==
Regular season polls
Poll	Pre- Season	Week 2	Week 3	Week 4	Week 5	Week 6	Week 7	Week 8	Week 9	Week 10	Week 11	Week 12	Week 13	Week 14	Week 15	Week 16	Week 17	Week 18	Week 19	Final
AP	NR	NR	NR	NR	NR	NR	NR	NR	NR	NR	RV	RV	RV	NR	NR	NR	NR	NR	NR	N/A
Coaches	NR	NR	NR	NR	NR	NR	NR	NR	NR	NR	NR	NR	RV	NR	NR	NR	NR	NR	NR	

Legend
	Increase in ranking
	Decrease in ranking
	Not ranked previous week
(RV)	Received votes
