= 2015–16 Gonzaga Bulldogs women's basketball team =

Intercollegiate basketball season

2015–16 Gonzaga Bulldogs women's basketball

WNIT, Second Round
- Conference: West Coast Conference
- Record: 19–14 (10–8 WCC)
- Head coach: Lisa Fortier (2nd season)
- Assistant coaches: Jordan Green; Stacy Clinesmith; Craig Fortier
- Home arena: McCarthey Athletic Center

2015–16 West Coast Conference women's basketball standings
	Conf.				Overall
Team	W		L	PCT	W		L	PCT
BYU	16	–	2	.889	26	–	7	.788
Saint Mary's	14	–	4	.778	24	–	8	.750
San Diego	13	–	5	.722	24	–	8	.750
Santa Clara	13	–	5	.722	23	–	9	.719
Gonzaga	10	–	8	.556	19	–	14	.576
San Francisco †	9	–	9	.500	21	–	12	.636
Pacific	6	–	12	.333	13	–	17	.433
Loyola Marymount	6	–	12	.333	11	–	20	.355
Pepperdine	2	–	16	.111	7	–	24	.226
Portland	1	–	17	.056	3	–	27	.100
† Tournament winner As of March 22, 2016; Rankings from AP poll

The 2015–16 Gonzaga Bulldogs women's basketball team represented Gonzaga University in the 2015–16 college basketball season. The Bulldogs (also informally referred to as the "Zags"), members of the West Coast Conference. The Bulldogs were led by second year head coach Lisa Fortier. The Zags played their home games at the McCarthey Athletic Center on the university campus in Spokane, Washington. They finished the season 19–14, 10–8 in WCC play to finish in fifth place. They lost in the quarterfinals of the WCC women's basketball tournament to Santa Clara. They were invited to the Women's National Invitation Tournament, where they defeated UC Riverside in the first round before losing to Utah in the second round.

== Roster ==
2015–16 Gonzaga Bulldogs women's basketball team
Players
Coaches

Pos.	#	Name	Height	Year	Previous school	Hometown
G/F	1	Chelsea Waters	6 ft 1 in (1.85 m)	Sr	Lewiston	Lewiston, ID
G	4	Makenlee Williams (I) (redshirt)	5 ft 11 in (1.8 m)	Sr	Syracuse; Utah State	Syracuse, UT
G	5	Georgia Stirton	5 ft 8 in (1.73 m)	Sr	Waverly Falcons; North Idaho College	Melbourne, Australia
G	10	Zhane Templeton	5 ft 11 in (1.8 m)	Fr	South Grand Prairie	Grand Prairie, TX
G	11	Laura Stockton	5 ft 8 in (1.73 m)	Fr	Gonzaga Prep	Spokane, WA
C	12	Emma Wolfram (injured)	6 ft 5 in (1.96 m)	RS So	South Kamloops	Kamloops, BC
F	13	Jill Barta	6 ft 3 in (1.91 m)	RS Fr	Fairfield	Fairfield, MT
G	14	Emma Stach	5 ft 9 in (1.75 m)	So	Avides Hurricanes	Buchholz, Germany
G	20	Kacie Bosch	5 ft 9 in (1.75 m)	So	Chinook	Lethbridge, AB
F	22	Shaniqua Nilles	6 ft 0 in (1.83 m)	RS Sr	West Valley	Spokane, WA
F	23	Kiara Kudron (injured)	6 ft 2 in (1.88 m)	Jr	Huron High School	New Boston, MI
G	30	Chandler Smith (I) (redshirt)	6 ft 0 in (1.83 m)	Fr	Brewster; Nebraska	Brewster, WA
G	31	Elle Tinkle (injured)	6 ft 2 in (1.88 m)	Sr	Big Sky	Missoula, MT
G	32	Melissa Holland (W)	5 ft 7 in (1.7 m)	Jr	Sacred Heart Preparatory	Atherton, CA
F	33	Zykera Rice	6 ft 1 in (1.85 m)	Fr	Clover Park	Lakewood, WA
C	44	Shelby Cheslek	6 ft 5 in (1.96 m)	RS Sr	Pullman	Pullman, WA

Head coach

- Lisa Fortier (Cal State Monterey)

Assistant coach(es)

- Jordan Green (George Fox)
- Stacy Clinesmith (UC Santa Barbara)
- Craig Fortier (Cal State Monterey)

Legend

- (C) Team captain
- (S) Suspended
- (I) Ineligible
- (W) Walk-on
- Injured
- Current redshirt

Roster

== Schedule ==
Date time, TV	Rank^{#}	Opponent^{#}	Result	Record	Site (attendance) city, state
Exhibition
11/06/2015*; 6:00 pm, TheW.tv		Carroll (Montana)	W 64–31		McCarthey Athletic Center (5,405); Spokane, WA
Non-conference regular season
11/13/2015*; 6:00 pm, TheW.tv		Air Force	W 88–35	1–0	McCarthey Athletic Center (5,574); Spokane, WA
11/15/2015*; 1:00 pm, SWX		No. 16 Stanford	L 48–65	1–1	McCarthey Athletic Center (6,000); Spokane, WA
11/19/2015*; 6:00 pm, TheW.tv		Eastern Washington	W 78–56	2–1	McCarthey Athletic Center (5,439); Spokane, WA
11/22/2015*; 2:00 pm, TheW.tv		West Virginia; Hall of Fame Women's Challenge	W 62–57	3–1	McCarthey Athletic Center (5,509); Spokane, WA
11/23/2015*; 6:00 pm, TheW.tv		Grand Canyon; Hall of Fame Women's Challenge	W 70–44	4–1	McCarthey Athletic Center (5,222); Spokane, WA
11/24/2015*; 6:00 pm, SWX		USC; Hall of Fame Women's Challenge	L 56–60	4–2	McCarthey Athletic Center (5,154); Spokane, WA
11/29/2015*; 11:00 am, ESPN3		vs. North Carolina; Hall of Fame Women's Challenge	L 62–67	4–3	Mohegan Sun Arena; Uncasville, CT
12/03/2015*; 6:00 pm, TheW.tv		Wyoming	W 61–57 ^{OT}	5–3	McCarthey Athletic Center (5,212); Spokane, WA
12/06/2015*; 2:00 pm, SWX		Montana State	W 65–52	6–3	McCarthey Athletic Center (6,000); Spokane, WA
12/08/2015*; 6:00 pm, P12N		at Washington State	L 48–55	6–4	Beasley Coliseum (1,302); Pullman, WA
12/11/2015*; 4:00 pm, TWCS OH		at Dayton	W 57–47	7–4	UD Arena (2,533); Dayton, OH
12/13/2015*; 11:00 am, PLN		at Colgate	W 80–50	8–4	Cotterell Court (522); Hamilton, NY
WCC regular season
12/21/2015; 7:00 pm, TheW.tv		at Pepperdine	W 74–57	9–4 (1–0)	Firestone Fieldhouse (201); Malibu, CA
12/23/2015; 1:00 pm, TheW.tv		at Loyola Marymount	W 66–59	10–4 (2–0)	Gersten Pavilion (401); Los Angeles, CA
12/31/2015; 5:00 pm, TheW.tv		San Francisco	W 68–47	11–4 (3–0)	McCarthey Athletic Center (5,733); Spokane, WA
01/02/2016; 2:00 pm, TheW.tv		Santa Clara	W 53–44	12–4 (4–0)	McCarthey Athletic Center (6,000); Spokane, WA
01/09/2016; 2:00 pm, TheW.tv		at Portland	W 71–63	13–4 (5–0)	Chiles Center (395); Portland, OR
01/14/2016; 6:00 pm, BYUtv		at BYU	L 54–58	13–5 (5–1)	Marriott Center (1,235); Provo, UT
01/16/2016; 2:00 pm, TheW.tv		at San Diego	L 54–63	13–6 (5–2)	Jenny Craig Pavilion (652); San Diego, CA
01/21/2016; 6:00 pm, TheW.tv		Saint Mary's	L 68–69	13–7 (5–3)	McCarthey Athletic Center (5,593); Spokane, WA
01/23/2016; 2:00 pm, SWX		Pacific	W 68–61	14–7 (6–3)	McCarthey Athletic Center (5,503); Spokane, WA
01/28/2016; 6:00 pm, TheW.tv		at Santa Clara	L 64–71	14–8 (6–4)	Leavey Center (400); Santa Clara, CA
01/30/2016; 2:00 pm, TheW.tv		at San Francisco	L 52–71	14–9 (6–5)	War Memorial Gymnasium (567); San Francisco, CA
02/04/2016; 6:00 pm, TheW.tv		Loyola Marymount	W 83–68	15–9 (7–5)	McCarthey Athletic Center (5,127); Spokane, WA
02/06/2016; 2:00 pm, SWX		Pepperdine	W 56–39	16–9 (8–5)	McCarthey Athletic Center (6,000); Spokane, WA
02/13/2016; 2:00 pm, TheW.tv		Portland	W 86–51	17–9 (9–5)	McCarthey Athletic Center (5,559); Spokane, WA
02/18/2016; 6:30 pm, TheW.tv		at Saint Mary's	L 47–66	17–10 (9–6)	McKeon Pavilion (405); Moraga, CA
02/20/2016; 2:00 pm, TheW.tv		at Pacific	L 83–84 ^{OT}	17–11 (9–7)	Alex G. Spanos Center (692); Stockton, CA
02/25/2016; 6:00 pm, TheW.tv		San Diego	L 57–58	17–12 (9–8)	McCarthey Athletic Center (5,630); Spokane, WA
02/27/2016; 2:00 pm, SWX		BYU	W 73–55	18–12 (10–8)	McCarthey Athletic Center (6,000); Spokane, WA
WCC Women's Tournament
03/03/2016; 8:00 pm, BYUtv		vs. Santa Clara; Quarterfinals	L 58–59	18–13	Orleans Arena (6,071); Paradise, NV
WNIT
03/17/2016*; 6:00 pm, TheW.tv		UC Riverside; First Round	W 88–54	19–13	McCarthey Athletic Center (1,309); Spokane, WA
03/21/2016*; 6:00 pm, TheW.tv		Utah; Second Round	L 77–92	19–14	McCarthey Athletic Center (3,000); Spokane, WA
*Non-conference game. ^{#}Rankings from AP Poll. (#) Tournament seedings in parentheses. All times are in Pacific Time.

== Rankings ==
2015–16 NCAA Division I women's basketball rankings

Regular season polls
Poll	Pre- Season	Week 2	Week 3	Week 4	Week 5	Week 6	Week 7	Week 8	Week 9	Week 10	Week 11	Week 12	Week 13	Week 14	Week 15	Week 16	Week 17	Week 18	Week 19	Final
AP	RV	NR	NR	NR	NR	NR	NR	NR	NR	NR	NR	NR	NR	NR	NR	NR	NR	NR	NR	N/A
Coaches	RV	RV	RV	NR	NR	NR	NR	NR	NR	NR	NR	NR	NR	NR	NR	NR	NR	NR	NR	NR

Legend
	Increase in ranking
	Decrease in ranking
	Not ranked previous week
(RV)	Received votes

== See also ==
- 2015–16 Gonzaga Bulldogs men's basketball team
- Gonzaga Bulldogs women's basketball
