= KLOR-TV =

KLOR-TV may refer to:

- KLOR-TV (Utah), defunct channel 11 in Provo, Utah which used the KLOR-TV call signs from 1958 to 1960
- KPTV, channel 12 in Portland, Oregon, which used the KLOR-TV call signs from 1955 to 1957
