= 2015–16 Santa Clara Broncos women's basketball team =

Intercollegiate basketball season

2015–16 Santa Clara Broncos women's basketball
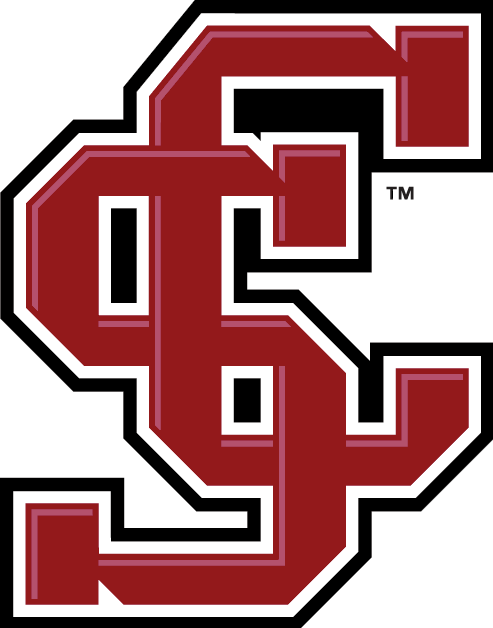

WNIT, First Round
- Conference: West Coast Conference
- Record: 23–9 (13–5 WCC)
- Head coach: JR Payne (2nd season)
- Assistant coaches: Toriano Towns; Shandrika Lee; Alex Carl
- Home arena: Leavey Center

2015–16 West Coast Conference women's basketball standings
	Conf.				Overall
Team	W		L	PCT	W		L	PCT
BYU	16	–	2	.889	26	–	7	.788
Saint Mary's	14	–	4	.778	24	–	8	.750
San Diego	13	–	5	.722	24	–	8	.750
Santa Clara	13	–	5	.722	23	–	9	.719
Gonzaga	10	–	8	.556	19	–	14	.576
San Francisco †	9	–	9	.500	21	–	12	.636
Pacific	6	–	12	.333	13	–	17	.433
Loyola Marymount	6	–	12	.333	11	–	20	.355
Pepperdine	2	–	16	.111	7	–	24	.226
Portland	1	–	17	.056	3	–	27	.100
† Tournament winner As of March 22, 2016; Rankings from AP poll

The 2015–16 Santa Clara Broncos women's basketball team represented Santa Clara University in the 2015–16 college basketball season. The Broncos, led by second year head coach JR Payne. The Broncos were members of the West Coast Conference and played their home games at the Leavey Center. They finished the season 23–9, 13–5 in WCC play to finish in a tie for third place. They advanced to the semifinals of the WCC women's basketball tournament, where they lost to BYU. They were invited to the Women's National Invitation Tournament, where they lost to Fresno State in the first round.

On March 28, 2016, Payne has accepted the head coaching job a Colorado. She finished at Santa Clara with a 2 year record of 34–27.

== Roster ==
2015–16 Santa Clara Broncos women's basketball team
Players
Coaches

Pos.	#	Name	Height	Year	Previous school	Hometown
G	3	Taylor Berry	5 ft 11 in (1.8 m)	So	St. Mary's	Martinez, CA
G	4	Dru Toleafoa	6 ft 0 in (1.83 m)	Fr	Brigidine College Randwick	Sydney, Australia
F	5	Beth Carlson	6 ft 2 in (1.88 m)	RS So	Archbishop Murphy	Mill Creek, WA
G	10	Nicole Vander Helm	6 ft 0 in (1.83 m)	Fr	Holy Cross Regional	Surrey, BC
G	12	Kyla Martin	5 ft 5 in (1.65 m)	So	Etiwanda; East Los Angeles College	Chino, CA
F	15	Marie Bertholdt	6 ft 1 in (1.85 m)	Jr	Alameda	Alameda, CA
F	20	Lori Parkinson	6 ft 1 in (1.85 m)	RS Jr	Cyprus; Southern Utah	West Valley, UT
G	22	Brooke Gallaway	5 ft 11 in (1.8 m)	Sr	Central Valley	Greenacres, WA
G	24	Savanna Hanson	6 ft 0 in (1.83 m)	Fr	King's	Edmonds, WA
G	25	Emily Wolph	5 ft 5 in (1.65 m)	So	Desert Vista	Phoenix, AZ
F	30	Andraya Flor	6 ft 0 in (1.83 m)	Fr	Seattle Prep	Seattle, WA
F	32	Morgan McGwire	6 ft 2 in (1.88 m)	So	Reno	Reno, NV
F	33	Devin Hudson	6 ft 3 in (1.91 m)	RS Sr	Colony; Long Beach State	Ontario, CA
F	44	Maddison Allen	6 ft 3 in (1.91 m)	RS Sr	John Paul College; Cal Poly	Brisbane, Australia

Head coach

- JR Payne (Saint Mary's)

Assistant coach(es)

- Toriano Towns (Saint Mary's)
- Shandrika Lee (Pepperdine)
- Alex Carl (Arizona State)

Legend

- (C) Team captain
- (S) Suspended
- (I) Ineligible
- (W) Walk-on
- Injured
- Current redshirt

Roster

== Schedule and results ==
Date time, TV	Rank^{#}	Opponent^{#}	Result	Record	Site (attendance) city, state
Exhibition
10/30/2015*; 6:00 pm		Notre Dame de Namur	W 90–50		Leavey Center; Santa Clara, CA
11/07/2015*; 2:00 pm		San Francisco State	W 87–41		Leavey Center; Santa Clara, CA
Non-conference regular season
11/14/2015*; 2:00 pm		at Washington	L 55–100	0–1	Alaska Airlines Arena (1,868); Seattle, WA
11/16/2015*; 4:00 pm		at USC	L 46–81	0–2	Galen Center (302); Los Angeles, CA
11/21/2015*; 2:00 pm, TheW.tv		Air Force	W 68–34	1–2	Leavey Center (300); Santa Clara, CA
11/23/2015*; 7:00 pm		at No. 13 Stanford	W 61–58	2–2	Maples Pavilion (2,668); Stanford, CA
11/27/2015*; 3:00 pm		at Cal Poly; Cal Poly/ShareSLO Holiday Tournament	W 69–63	3–2	Mott Athletic Center (557); San Luis Obispo, CA
11/28/2015*; 5:00 pm		vs. Evansville; Cal Poly/ShareSLO Holiday Tournament	W 62–44	4–2	Mott Athletic Center (95); San Luis Obispo, CA
12/01/2015*; 7:00 pm		at UC Santa Barbara	W 48–37	5–2	The Thunderdome (319); Santa Barbara, CA
12/04/2015*; 6:00 pm, TheW.tv		Simpson (California)	W 112–34	6–2	Leavey Center (421); Santa Clara, CA
12/06/2015*; 2:00 pm, TheW.tv		Hope International	W 78–54	7–2	Leavey Center (229); Santa Clara, CA
12/12/2015*; 2:00 pm, TheW.tv		Texas Tech	W 75–70	8–2	Leavey Center (252); Santa Clara, CA
12/18/2015*; 6:00 pm, TheW.tv		UC Santa Barbara	W 66–48	9–2	Leavey Center (320); Santa Clara, CA
WCC regular season
12/21/2015; 6:00 pm, TheW.tv		Pacific	W 76–52	10–2 (1–0)	Leavey Center (255); Santa Clara, CA
12/23/2015; 1:00 pm, TheW.tv		at Saint Mary's	W 73–67	11–2 (2–0)	McKeon Pavilion (470); Moraga, CA
12/31/2015; 4:00 pm, TheW.tv		at Portland	W 67–45	12–2 (3–0)	Chiles Center (291); Portland, OR
01/02/2016; 2:00 pm, TheW.tv		at Gonzaga	L 44–53	12–3 (3–1)	McCarthey Athletic Center (6,000); Spokane, WA
01/07/2016; 6:00 pm, TheW.tv		BYU	L 63–68	12–4 (3–2)	Leavey Center; Santa Clara, CA
01/09/2016; 2:00 pm, TheW.tv		San Diego	L 58–70	12–5 (3–3)	Leavey Center (250); Santa Clara, CA
01/14/2016; 7:00 pm, TheW.tv		at Pepperdine	W 62–60	13–5 (4–3)	Firestone Fieldhouse (217); Malibu, CA
01/16/2016; 2:00 pm, TheW.tv		at Loyola Marymount	W 57–56	14–5 (5–3)	Gersten Pavilion (523); Los Angeles, CA
01/23/2016; 2:00 pm, TheW.tv		San Francisco	W 68–57	15–5 (6–3)	Leavey Center (250); Santa Clara, CA
01/28/2016; 6:00 pm, TheW.tv		Gonzaga	W 71–64	16–5 (7–3)	Leavey Center (400); Santa Clara, CA
01/30/2016; 2:00 pm, TheW.tv		Portland	W 66–47	17–5 (8–3)	Leavey Center (301); Santa Clara, CA
02/04/2016; 7:00 pm, TheW.tv		at San Francisco	W 59–57	18–5 (9–3)	War Memorial Gymnasium (304); San Francisco, CA
02/11/2016; 6:00 pm, TheW.tv		at San Diego	W 61–47	19–5 (10–3)	Jenny Craig Pavilion (607); San Diego, CA
02/13/2016; 1:00 pm, BYUtv		at BYU	L 63–70	19–6 (10–4)	Marriott Center (1,509); Provo, UT
02/18/2016; 6:00 pm, TheW.tv		Loyola Marymount	W 68–41	20–6 (11–4)	Leavey Center (250); Santa Clara, CA
02/20/2016; 2:00 pm, TheW.tv		Pepperdine	W 84–50	21–6 (12–4)	Leavey Center (250); Santa Clara, CA
02/25/2015; 6:00 pm, TheW.tv		Saint Mary's	L 70–78	21–7 (12–5)	Leavey Center (500); Santa Clara, CA
02/27/2015; 2:00 pm, TheW.tv		at Pacific	W 66–60	22–7 (13–5)	Alex G. Spanos Center (544); Stockton, CA
WCC Women's Tournament
03/03/2016; 8:00 pm, BYUtv		vs. Gonzaga; Quarterfinals	W 59–58	23–7	Orleans Arena (6,071); Las Vegas, NV
03/07/2016; 2:00 pm, BYUtv		vs. BYU; Semifinals	L 67–87	23–8	Orleans Arena; Las Vegas, NV
WNIT
03/18/2016*; 7:00 pm, MW Net		at Fresno State; First Round	L 53–59	23–9	Save Mart Center (1,478); Fresno, CA
*Non-conference game. ^{#}Rankings from AP Poll. (#) Tournament seedings in parentheses. All times are in Pacific Time.

== See also ==
- 2015–16 Santa Clara Broncos men's basketball team
