= 2015–16 Pacific Tigers women's basketball team =

Intercollegiate basketball season

2015–16 Pacific Tigers women's basketball
- Conference: West Coast Conference
- Record: 13–17 (6–12 WCC)
- Head coach: Bradley Davis (1st season)
- Assistant coaches: Amy Starr; Alexis Mezzetta; Amy VanHollebeke
- Home arena: Alex G. Spanos Center

2015–16 West Coast Conference women's basketball standings
	Conf.				Overall
Team	W		L	PCT	W		L	PCT
BYU	16	–	2	.889	26	–	7	.788
Saint Mary's	14	–	4	.778	24	–	8	.750
San Diego	13	–	5	.722	24	–	8	.750
Santa Clara	13	–	5	.722	23	–	9	.719
Gonzaga	10	–	8	.556	19	–	14	.576
San Francisco †	9	–	9	.500	21	–	12	.636
Pacific	6	–	12	.333	13	–	17	.433
Loyola Marymount	6	–	12	.333	11	–	20	.355
Pepperdine	2	–	16	.111	7	–	24	.226
Portland	1	–	17	.056	3	–	27	.100
† Tournament winner As of March 22, 2016; Rankings from AP poll

The 2015–16 Pacific Tigers women's basketball team represented the University of the Pacific during the 2015–16 NCAA Division I women's basketball season. The Tigers were led by first year head coach Bradley Davis. They played their home games at Alex G. Spanos Center and were members of the West Coast Conference. They finished the season 13–17, 6–12 in WCC play to finish in a tie for seventh place. They lost in the first round of the WCC women's tournament to Pepperdine.

== Roster ==
2015–16 Pacific Tigers women's basketball team
Players
Coaches

Pos.	#	Name	Height	Year	Previous school	Hometown
F	3	Mauriana Clayton	6 ft 2 in (1.88 m)	Jr	Bishop Amat; Central Arizona	Rancho, CA
G	4	Tylah King	6 ft 0 in (1.83 m)	Fr	Brisbane State	Queensland, Australia
G/F	5	Emily Simons	5 ft 10 in (1.78 m)	Jr	Box Hill Secondary	Doncaster, Australia
F	11	Eli Lopez Sagrera	6 ft 2 in (1.88 m)	Jr	Southern Idaho	Barcelona, Spain
F	12	Erin Butler	5 ft 11 in (1.8 m)	RS Jr	Mission Viejo; Arizona	Rancho Santa Margarita, CA
G	13	Chelsea Lidy	5 ft 9 in (1.75 m)	Fr	Bishop Montgomery	Torrance, CA
G	15	GeAnna Luaulu-Summers	5 ft 9 in (1.75 m)	So	Sacred Heart Cathedral	San Francisco, CA
G	20	Unique Coleman	5 ft 10 in (1.78 m)	Jr	St. Mary's	Stockton, CA
G	21	Ameela Li	5 ft 6 in (1.68 m)	Fr	Piedmont	Piedmont, CA
G/F	22	Desire Finnie	5 ft 11 in (1.8 m)	So	Berkeley	Berkeley, CA
G	23	Hailie Eackles	5 ft 9 in (1.75 m)	RS Sr	Pinewood	Sunnyvale, CA
G/F	24	Ariana Vaughn	5 ft 11 in (1.8 m)	Fr	Brookside Christian	Stockton, CA
G	30	Najah Queenland	5 ft 10 in (1.78 m)	So	Sacramento	Sacramento, CA
F	32	Whitnee Wehi	6 ft 2 in (1.88 m)	Fr	John Paul	Brisbane, Australia

Head coach

- Bradley Davis (California)

Assistant coach(es)

- Amy Starr (Washington State)
- Alexis Mezzetta (UC San Diego)
- Amy VanHollebeke (Pacific)

Legend

- (C) Team captain
- (S) Suspended
- (I) Ineligible
- (W) Walk-on
- Injured
- Current redshirt

Roster

== Schedule ==
Date time, TV	Rank^{#}	Opponent^{#}	Result	Record	Site (attendance) city, state
Exhibition
11/07/2015*; 5:00 pm		Sonoma State	W 63–51		Alex G. Spanos Center; Stockton, CA
Non-conference regular season
11/13/2015*; 7:00 pm		at Cal State Bakersfield	W 80–74	1–0	Icardo Center (962); Bakersfield, CA
11/16/2015*; 7:00 pm		at UC Davis	W 66–53	2–0	The Pavilion (520); Davis, CA
11/19/2015*; 6:00 pm		at Montana	L 54–64	2–1	Dahlberg Arena (2,246); Missoula, MT
11/21/2015*; 5:00 pm, MW Net		at Utah State	L 70–78	2–2	Smith Spectrum (477); Logan, UT
11/25/2015*; 3:00 pm		at North Carolina	W 66–63	3–2	Carmichael Arena (1,694); Chapel Hill, NC
11/28/2015*; 10:00 am		at Gardner–Webb	W 84–77	4–2	Paul Porter Arena (313); Boiling Springs, NC
12/02/2015*; 7:00 pm, TheW.tv		Long Beach State	L 60–68	4–3	Alex G. Spanos Center (443); Stockton, CA
12/05/2015*; 12:00 pm		at Arizona	L 56–69	4–4	McKale Center (765); Tucson, AZ
12/12/2015*; 2:00 pm, TheW.tv		San Jose State	W 81–69	5–4	Alex G. Spanos Center (417); Stockton, CA
12/15/2015*; 11:00 am, TheW.tv		Cal State Stanislaus	W 74–61	6–4	Alex G. Spanos Center (2,137); Stockton, CA
12/17/2015*; 7:00 pm, TheW.tv		Nevada	W 74–52	7–4	Alex G. Spanos Center (395); Stockton, CA
WCC regular season
12/21/2015; 6:00 pm, TheW.tv		at Santa Clara	L 52–76	7–5 (0–1)	Leavey Center (255); Santa Clara, CA
12/23/2015; 5:00 pm, TheW.tv		San Francisco	W 70–57	8–5 (1–1)	Alex G. Spanos Center (317); Stockton, CA
12/31/2015; 4:00 pm, TheW.tv		at San Diego	L 56–69	8–6 (1–2)	Jenny Craig Pavilion (244); San Diego, CA
01/02/2016; 1:00 pm, BYUtv		at BYU	L 62–79	8–7 (1–3)	Marriott Center (809); Provo, UT
01/07/2016; 7:00 pm, TheW.tv		Pepperdine	W 65–62	9–7 (2–3)	Alex G. Spanos Center (434); Stockton, CA
01/09/2016; 2:00 pm, TheW.tv		Loyola Marymount	L 60–63	9–8 (2–4)	Alex G. Spanos Center (442); Stockton, CA
01/16/2016; 3:00 pm, TheW.tv		Saint Mary's	L 73–82	9–9 (2–5)	Alex G. Spanos Center (2,205); Stockton, CA
01/21/2016; 7:00 pm, TheW.tv		at Portland	W 72–64	10–9 (3–5)	Chiles Center (240); Portland, OR
01/23/2016; 2:00 pm, TheW.tv		at Gonzaga	L 61–68	10–10 (3–6)	McCarthey Athletic Center (5,503); Spokane, WA
01/30/2016; 1:00 pm, TheW.tv		at Saint Mary's	L 75–83	10–11 (3–7)	McKeon Pavilion (509); Moraga, CA
02/04/2016; 7:00 pm, TheW.tv		BYU	L 57–67	10–12 (3–8)	Alex G. Spanos Center (511); Stockton, CA
02/06/2015; 2:00 pm, TheW.tv		San Diego	L 56–59	10–13 (3–9)	Alex G. Spanos Center (543); Stockton, CA
02/11/2016; 7:00 pm, TheW.tv		at Loyola Marymount	L 88–96 ^{2OT}	10–14 (3–10)	Gersten Pavilion (316); Los Angeles, CA
02/13/2016; 2:00 pm, TheW.tv		at Pepperdine	W 92–64	11–14 (4–10)	Firestone Fieldhouse (233); Malibu, CA
02/18/2016; 7:00 pm, TheW.tv		Portland	W 87–38	12–14 (5–10)	Alex G. Spanos Center (441); Stockton, CA
02/20/2016; 2:00 pm, TheW.tv		Gonzaga	W 84–83 ^{OT}	13–14 (6–10)	Alex G. Spanos Center (692); Stockton, CA
02/25/2016; 7:00 pm, TheW.tv		at San Francisco	L 71–81	13–15 (6–11)	War Memorial Gymnasium (346); San Francisco, CA
02/27/2016; 2:00 pm, TheW.tv		Santa Clara	L 60–66	13–16 (6–12)	Alex G. Spanos Center (544); Stockton, CA
WCC Women's Tournament
03/03/2016; 2:00 pm, BYUtv		vs. Pepperdine; First Round	L 72–81	13–17	Orleans Arena; Paradise, NV
*Non-conference game. ^{#}Rankings from AP Poll. (#) Tournament seedings in parentheses. All times are in Pacific Time.

== Rankings ==
+ Regular season polls	Poll	Pre- season	Week 1	Week 2	Week 3	Week 4	Week 5	Week 6	Week 7	Week 8	Week 9	Week 10	Week 11	Week 12	Week 13	Week 14	Week 15	Week 16	Week 17	Week 18 Postseason	Final
AP																					
Coaches																					

Legend
	Increase in ranking
	Decrease in ranking
	No change
(RV)	Received votes

== See also ==
2015–16 Pacific Tigers men's basketball team
