= Ancestors (TV series) =

Ancestors was a public television mini-series on family history, (or genealogy). It was produced by KBYU-TV in conjunction with the Family History Library and PBS. It has also been available on DVD.

== Episode list ==
=== Series one ===
1. "Getting Started"
2. "Looking at Home"
3. "Gathering Family Stories"
4. "The Paper Trail"
5. "Libraries and Archives"
6. "Census and Military Records"
7. "African American Research"
8. "Your Medical Heritage"
9. "High-Tech Help"
10. "Leaving a Legacy"

=== Series two ===
1. "Records at Risk"
2. "Family Records"
3. "Compiled Records"
4. "Genealogy and Technology"
5. "Vital Records"
6. "Religious Records"
7. "Cemetery Records"
8. "Census Records"
9. "Military Records"
10. "Newspapers"
11. "Probate Records"
12. "Immigration Records"
13. "Writing a Family History"
