= KBYU-FM =

Classical music radio station in Salt Lake City

- Provo, Utah; United States
- Broadcast area: Salt Lake City-Ogden-Provo, Utah
- Frequency: 89.1 MHz (HD Radio)
- Branding: Classical 89

Programming
- Format: Classical music
- Subchannels: HD2: BYU Radio
- Affiliations: American Public Media; WFMT Radio Network

Ownership
- Owner: Brigham Young University
- Sister stations: KBYU-TV; KUMT

History
- First air date: May 9, 1960 (as KBRG at 88.9) (originally carrier current at 660, 1946-1960)
- Former call signs: KBRG (May–November 1960)
- Former frequencies: 88.9 MHz (1960–1988); 660 KHz (1948-1960)
- Call sign meaning: Brigham Young University

Technical information
- Licensing authority: FCC
- Facility ID: 6825
- Class: C
- ERP: 32,000 watts
- HAAT: 907 meters (2,976 ft)
- Transmitter coordinates: 40°36′28″N 112°09′36″W
- Translator: See § Translators

Links
- Public license information: Public file; LMS
- Webcast: Listen live
- Website: www.classical89.org

KBYU-FM (89.1 MHz) is a classical music radio station run by Brigham Young University in Provo, Utah. It is known on-air as Classical 89. It is a production of BYU Radio. It transmits at an effective radiated power of 32 kW. Its transmitting tower is located on a peak of the Oquirrh Mountains northwest of the university campus, and southwest of Salt Lake City.

The station previously broadcast at a frequency of 88.9 MHz (during which time its nickname was Classical 88). The frequency was shifted in 1988 by directive of the FCC, to alleviate interference for nearby frequencies used for aerial navigation, and to allow for a new full-power station to be built on 99.5 in the Salt Lake market. Classical 89 also has the following translators: 89.3 FM K207FL Spanish Fork, 106.9 FM K295BW Levan, 96.1 FM K241BV Milford, 100.3 FM K262BM Cedar City, 105.5 FM K288HM Ivins, K272AB Preston.

== History ==
KBYU began as a student-run carrier current station at 660 AM in 1946. T. Earl Pardoe, a professor at Brigham Young University, suggested to student Owen S. Rich that the university should have its own radio station. Using his experience as a radio and radar technical during World War II, it became available across Provo and the surrounding area in 1948 by using the city's power lines as an antenna. The radio programming included talent shows, live dramas, club features, and popular music. In 1960, BYU was granted a commercial FM license.

The new station signed on for the first time on May 9, 1960, under the temporary calls KBRG. After negotiations to get the KBYU calls from a liberty ship, the call letters changed to KBYU on November 9, 1960. The station presently broadcasts around the clock, having gone to that schedule in the mid-1980s. Most of its on-air staff consists of professionals, although students do cover some weeknight and weekend on-air shifts. Students also play a key role in behind-the-scenes functions.

The station is operated as a non-profit corporation, and solicits donations from the public to raise a portion of its operating revenue. Other funding sources include Brigham Young University and local underwriting by businesses and arts organizations.

In 2006, KBYU-FM began broadcasting an HD Radio signal along with its main signal, and subsequently began carrying sports and talk programming from sister station BYU Radio on its HD2 signal.

On October 23, 2017, Brigham Young University announced that KBYU-FM and KBYU-TV would drop their existing programming and become full-time outlets for BYU Radio and BYUtv respectively. The planned flip of KBYU-FM was met with criticism from listeners, as it was the only terrestrial radio station in the market devoted to classical music. On April 26, 2018, the university announced that it would instead purchase 107.9 KUMT to use as a full-time outlet for BYU Radio, allowing it to maintain KBYU-FM's classical format.

== Programming ==
KBYU-FM carries a classical music format, as well as BYU devotionals and forums. In addition to carriage on FM radio, the station is also available online.

== Translators ==
Call sign	Frequency	City of license	FID	ERP (W)	HAAT	Class	FCC info
K272AB	102.3 FM	Preston, Idaho	22345	8	205 m (673 ft)	D	LMS
K262BM	100.3 FM	Cedar City, Utah	141827	10	433.2 m (1,421 ft)	D	LMS
K288HM	105.5 FM	Ivins, Utah	141740	10	1,007.8 m (3,306 ft)	D	LMS
K241BV	96.1 FM	Milford, Utah	141931	10	1,185.9 m (3,891 ft)	D	LMS
K295BW	106.9 FM	Levan, Utah	141659	6	552.6 m (1,813 ft)	D	LMS
K207FL	89.3 FM	Payson, Utah	6824	250	643.6 m (2,112 ft)	D	LMS
