= BYU Radio =

University radio station in Provo, Utah, United States

- Provo, Utah; United States
- Frequencies: SiriusXM 143; KBYU-FM-HD2 ((89.1-2) MHz); KUMT (107.9 MHz); KBYU-TV 11.2

Programming
- Format: Talk
- Affiliations: BYU Athletics

Ownership
- Owner: Brigham Young University

History
- First air date: August 1, 2002
- Call sign meaning: Brigham Young University

Technical information
- Transmitter coordinates: 40°15′N 111°39′W

Links
- Website: www.byuradio.org

BYU Radio (stylized as BYUradio) is a podcast network and a talk radio station run by Brigham Young University (BYU) in Provo, Utah, United States. The podcast network provides family-friendly and lifestyle programming as well as content related to BYU Cougars sports. Sports events are live streamed and air alongside podcasts on the radio station, which is broadcast on FM radio (KUMT 107.9 FM and KBYU-FM 89.1 HD2) on the Wasatch Front and nationally on SiriusXM Radio channel 143.

BYU Radio began in its present form on August 1, 2002, but its roots date to the LDS Radio Network, a service of the LDS Church–owned Bonneville International. It broadcast using FM subcarriers and satellite coverage from 1994 to 2002 and aired church music and religious programs. Under BYU, its focus broadened to include sports coverage, and two secondary streams were added and operated from 2003 to 2011. That year, BYU Radio was added to the SiriusXM lineup. In 2018, BYU purchased KUMT to provide a full-time FM broadcast in northern Utah for BYU Radio. The service has broadened its scope to include a suite of podcasts.

== History ==
In March 1994, Bonneville International began producing the LDS Radio Network, which was broadcast in nine U.S. metropolitan areas on sideband subcarrier signals requiring special radios to receive, by satellite, and by cable radio to some Salt Lake City homes. The station's programs consisted of recorded music and talk, audio of the 10 p.m. newscast from Bonneville's KSL-TV, a daily LDS Church news report, and recordings of readings from the Book of Mormon, as well as church music. Outside of LDS General Conference broadcasts, live programs were scarce. In addition to the sideband signals from Bonneville FM stations, two Idaho stations, KKJC in Boise and KWBH in Rexburg, aired LDS Radio Network programs, and Dish Network offered LDS Radio to its subscribers.

When Bonneville decided to discontinue the format, the station was transferred to BYU. BYU Radio launched on Dish Network and as an internet radio station on August 1, 2002. The original format featured a selection of music by artists who were members of The Church of Jesus Christ of Latter-day Saints and alumni of Brigham Young University. Live BYU sports broadcasts were added. A second stream, called BYU Radio Instrumental, launched in 2003. In 2008, a third stream, BYU Radio International, launched featuring Spanish- and Portuguese-language programming.

In 2006, KBYU-FM added a simulcast of BYU Radio on its HD Radio subchannel.

On July 1, 2011, BYU Radio expanded beyond inspirational music from the Church of Jesus Christ of Latter-day Saints and relaunched as a national talk-format station. BYU Radio began broadcasting on SiriusXM satellite radio, assigned to channel 143 on both the Sirius and XM lineup.

On October 17, 2011, BYU discontinued two of its Internet streams: BYU Radio International and BYU Radio Instrumental. The university said listeners would stream the music as background music causing high bandwidth costs for BYU. Those two services were not broadcast on Dish or SiriusXM, and were only available online.

On August 9, 2016, Greg Wrubell joined BYU as the Director of Broadcast Media. Among his responsibilities were moving BYU athletics flagship from KSL to BYU Radio and turning his coaches shows into a TV/radio simulcast for BYUtv and the Nu Skin BYU Sports Network radio affiliates. With his new responsibilities at BYU, Wrubell left KSL, though KSL remained part of the BYU Sports Networks affiliates. With the change, BYU Radio became the official flagship station for football, women's soccer, and men's basketball broadcasts. ESPN 960 remained the flagship carrier of women's soccer matches that conflict with football or men's basketball broadcasts until BYU joined the Big 12, at which time women's soccer broadcasts were discontinued.

On October 23, 2017, Brigham Young University announced that KBYU-FM would drop its classical music programming and become a full-time carrier of BYU Radio beginning June 30, 2018. However, on April 26, 2018, BYU backtracked on the plans following listener criticism of the planned flip, and announced its planned purchase of 107.9 KUMT to serve as a full-time outlet. KUMT also gained BYU baseball and women's basketball radio broadcasts with the move and became the flagship station for those athletics.

On June 21, 2021, Jeff Simpson became the new managing director of BYU Broadcasting, overseeing BYU Radio and TV. Previously, Simpson served as the president and publisher of the Deseret News and worked at both Walt Disney Pictures and Buena Vista Television.

On February 7, 2022, BYU Radio transitioned from a radio station to a full podcast network, with the goal to "improve families and communities, illuminate the good in people, and celebrate both the wonder all around us and the incredible things we humans can accomplish when we choose to bridge divides."

In 2023, the network won its first Signal Awards, with The Lisa Show winning a Silver Signal Award in the Self-Improvement & Self-Help category and Constant Wonder winning a Gold Signal Award in the Religion & Spirituality category. In 2024, the network's audio drama podcast Kaboom took home four additional Signals Awards, including Best Kids Podcast, Best Road Trip Podcast, and Best Writing (Fiction).

== Programming ==
The talk format reaches into Brigham Young University's depth of academic experts and topics. The station's slogan, "Together," reflects the station's mission to address the broad spectrum of listeners and their beliefs, bringing together all walks of life who have a desire to do good.

The station also carries inspirational programming, including BYU's campus devotionals live on Tuesdays, and Sunday programming consisting of audio from BYU Television programs and from the Church of Jesus Christ of Latter-day Saints, including the long-running radio program Music and the Spoken Word.

During the regular sports season, BYU Radio broadcasts live coverage of BYU football, men's and women's basketball games, and baseball through the Nu Skin BYU Sports Network. The station previously carried women's soccer as well.

The station streams online, is simulcast on TuneIn, and is carried on Dish Network radio.

BYU Radio has multiple podcasts on air as well as on streaming platforms including Spotify, Apple Podcasts, and Google Podcasts. As of 2023, BYU Radio podcasts on air include The Lisa Show, Top of Mind with Julie Rose, The Apple Seed, Constant Wonder, Kaboom, and In Good Faith. All of these programs, in alignment with BYU's mission statement, are to provide uplifting and educational media.
