= KBYU-TV =

Television station in Provo, Utah

- Provo–Salt Lake City, Utah; United States
- City: Provo, Utah
- Channels: Digital: 17 (UHF); Virtual: 11
- Branding: BYUtv

Programming
- Affiliations: 11.1: BYUtv; 11.2: BYU Radio; 11.3: Simulcast of KBYU-FM

Ownership
- Owner: Brigham Young University
- Sister stations: TV: KSL-TV; Radio: KBYU-FM, KSL, KSFI, KSL-FM, KUMT

History
- Founded: December 17, 1958
- First air date: November 15, 1965 (under BYU)
- Former call signs: KLOR-TV (1958–1962)
- Former channel numbers: Analog: 11 (VHF, 1965–2009); Digital: 44 (UHF, 2000–2018)
- Former affiliations: NET (1965–1970); PBS (1970–2018)
- Call sign meaning: Brigham Young University

Technical information
- Licensing authority: FCC
- Facility ID: 6823
- ERP: 298 kW
- HAAT: 1,257 m (4,124 ft)
- Transmitter coordinates: 40°39′33″N 112°12′10″W
- Translator(s): see § Translators

Links
- Public license information: Public file; LMS
- Website: www.byutv.org/kbyu

KBYU-TV (channel 11) is a non-commercial educational independent television station licensed to Provo, Utah, United States, serving Salt Lake City and the state of Utah. The station is owned by Brigham Young University (BYU), an arm of the Church of Jesus Christ of Latter-day Saints (LDS Church). KBYU-TV's studios are located on the BYU campus in Provo, and its transmitter is located on Farnsworth Peak in the Oquirrh Mountains, southwest of Salt Lake City.

KBYU-TV airs programming of interest to members of the LDS movement, including religious and instructional shows, as well as family-friendly entertainment programs, often with a moral lesson.

== History ==
=== KLOR-TV ===
The channel 11 allocation in Provo was first intended to be built as a commercial station. In October 1955, the Beehive Telecasting Corporation, owned by Samuel B. Nissley, filed to build channel 11, with studios in Orem and a transmitter on Lake Mountain. The permit was granted in December 1957. Two months later, ground was broken on studio facilities for the station. KLOR went on the air as Utah's first independent television station on December 17, 1958, with its call letters standing for the fact it launched full color television operations on its first day.

Channel 11's commercial existence was short-lived. The independent station struggled against larger outlets in Salt Lake City, facing the burden of having to buy an additional 18 hours of programming per day. In December 1959, Nissley sued General Electric, which provided and installed the transmitter, for more than $1 million, claiming negligent transmitter installation impaired KLOR's signal in the market's most lucrative portion, the Salt Lake Valley. Nissley claimed that the station's signal was sent over a desert area west of Provo, rather than areas closer to Salt Lake City. by this time, KLOR was also facing lawsuits from potential creditors, including program suppliers. KLOR went silent March 12, 1960, when a power surge blew out a transformer. Beehive went into bankruptcy on July 1, 1960.

=== Acquisition and operation by BYU ===
In March 1962, BYU filed an application to buy KLOR's license, but not its Orem studio facilities. The Federal Communications Commission (FCC) approved the sale on September 25, 1962, with the stipulation that channel 11 become non-commercial; the KBYU-TV callsign was instituted on October 15. In 1964, BYU filed to relocate the studio to the Fine Arts Center on the campus and the transmitter to Mount Vision in the Oquirrh Mountains. The KLOR-TV studios were sold to two local businessmen and became other offices before being demolished.

The station returned to the air with regular programs on November 15, 1965, though the station was already on the air during the daytime for broadcasts to schools in association with the Utah State Department of Public Instruction. Originally a member of National Educational Television (NET), it joined PBS when it largely replaced NET in 1970. For most of the next half-century, Salt Lake City was one of the smallest markets with two PBS member stations; its main competition was the University of Utah's KUED (channel 7). In 2010, KBYU-TV rebranded as "Eleven".

On July 2, 2018, the station ended its membership with PBS and began simulcasting BYU's co-owned specialty channel BYUtv on its primary subchannel. BYU Broadcasting managing director Michael Dunn noted that two-thirds of channel 11's schedule was identical to that of KUED, something that "makes no sense" in the current era of broadcasting. This leaves KUED as the sole PBS station for the Salt Lake City market and the state of Utah.

== Programming ==
Prior to July 2, 2018, programming on KBYU-TV consisted of general PBS fare, with emphasis on children's, informational and entertainment programming. The station also airs special programs related to the LDS Church, and offered a nightly block of classic television programs, such as I Love Lucy, Perry Mason, My Three Sons, The Andy Griffith Show and Little House on the Prairie; as such, it was one of the few public television stations in the United States that broadcasts programming normally acquired for U.S. commercial syndication.

The only exception that KBYU-TV currently airs from the straight simulcast of BYU TV is the weekday student-produced half-hour newscast, Eleven News at Noon. As an educational station it does not carry advertising, and BYU TV itself does not carry advertising, instead carrying promotional spots for the network's programming during breaks (the national feed also carries KBYU-TV's hourly legal station identification).

KBYU-TV has produced some notable programs for national distribution. Ancestors, produced in conjunction with the LDS Church's Family History Library and PBS, was a highly successful series of videos on family genealogy. It was so well received that KBYU-TV produced a second series of videos, also entitled Ancestors, which proved to be even more successful. Small Fortunes: Microcredit and the Future of Poverty, produced in 2005, explored the business of Microcredit through eleven providers of the service. Another show produced by KBYU was Hooked on Aerobics, which was on the air for many years.

== Technical information ==
=== Subchannels ===
The station's signal is multiplexed:

Subchannels of KBYU-TV
Subchannel	Res.	Short name	Programming
11.1	1080i	KBYU	BYUtv
11.2	480i	BYURDIO	BYU Radio
11.3	480i	KBYUFM	Classical 89

KBYU-TV also utilizes the alternate audio tracks that can be activated through the second audio program function, both carried on the third alternate audio track: the station's main channel features an audio simulcast of KBYU-FM (89.1). Digital subchannel 11.2 featured an alternate audio feed of BYU Radio (which is commonly found streamed over the Internet), but was taken off-the-air on June 30, 2018, when BYU TV International ceased operations.

=== Analog-to-digital conversion ===
In 1997, KBYU-TV was allotted UHF channel 39 for its digital signal, but in 1999, the station changed its digital allotment to UHF channel 44 as part of a digital channel realignment coordinated by DTV Utah, a consortium of eight Salt Lake City market television stations, of which KBYU is a member. KBYU-DT began broadcasting its digital signal on November 15, 2000, and it was licensed on January 23, 2003.

KBYU-TV shut down its analog signal, over VHF channel 11, on June 12, 2009, the official date on which full-power television stations in the United States transitioned from analog to digital broadcasts under federal mandate. The station's digital signal remained on its pre-transition UHF channel 44, using virtual channel 11.

Since KBYU's former physical TV channel was in the 600 MHz band being sold off in the FCC's incentive auction, with channels 38 to 51 being eliminated, the station filed for a construction permit in September 2017 to move to physical channel 17 at the same location, power and height.

=== Translators ===
KBYU-TV uses an extensive network of translator stations to extend its signal throughout Utah, plus parts of northern Arizona, western Colorado, southern Idaho, and eastern Nevada:

- K31OA-D Antimony
- K36FM-D Beaver, etc.
- K11XH-D Blanding/Monticello
- K19HE-D Bluff
- K29MA-D Boulder
- K29IX-D Caineville
- K16MM-D Circleville
- K31OT-D Clear Creek
- K29IN-D Coalville
- K34PV-D Cortez, CO
- K26OC-D Delta
- K35IK-D Duchesne
- K29MR-D Emery
- K35NG-D Escalante
- K31OS-D Ferron
- K35NX-D Fillmore, etc.
- K27JR-D Fishlake Resort
- K28OO-D Fountain Green
- K34NZ-D Fremont
- K20MR-D Garfield, etc.
- K36OE-D Garfield County
- K13AAM-D Garrison, etc.
- K20JZ-D Green River
- K31OO-D Green River
- K33OI-D Hanksville
- K36IL-D Hanna & Tabiona
- K18MK-D Hatch
- K32MY-D Heber/Midway
- K11XK-D Helper
- K30PC-D Henefer & Echo
- K19LL-D Henrieville
- K31OU-D Huntington
- K31OF-D Kanab
- K19LF-D Koosharem
- K16MK-D Laketown, etc.
- K10QR-D Leamington
- K11XG-D Logan
- K11XB-D Long Valley Junction
- K21HV-D Malad, ID
- K36LE-D Manila, etc.
- K31FN-D Manti & Ephraim
- K25OW-D Marysvale
- K20MZ-D Mayfield
- K16HK-D Mexican Hat
- K33JE-D Modena, Beryl, etc.
- K15HM-D Montezuma Creek/Aneth
- K14QZ-D Mount Pleasant
- K16MX-D Myton
- K16HI-D Navajo Mountain
- K18MJ-D Nephi
- K16HJ-D Oljeto
- K20NQ-D Orangeville
- K17JC-D Orderville
- K20JV-D Overton, NV
- K19LK-D Panguitch
- K25HG-D Preston, ID
- K12XH-D Price
- K28PU-D Randolph
- K18ME-D Richfield, etc.
- K12XG-D Roosevelt
- K25PB-D Rural Iron, etc.
- K19LO-D Rural Sevier County
- K12XC-D Salina & Redmond
- K29IM-D Samak
- K36FT-D Santa Clara
- K17NM-D Scipio
- K30PO-D Scofield
- K21MR-D Soda Springs, ID
- K23IV-D Spring Glen
- K29MV-D Spring Glen
- K17DG-D Rural Summit County
- K19LH-D Teasdale
- K28OJ-D Tropic & Cannonville
- K34JB-D Vernal, etc.
- K23JN-D Virgin
- K32IU-D Wanship
- K11XF-D Woodland

== Other BYU Broadcasting divisions ==
BYU Broadcasting also operates classical music radio station KBYU-FM (89.1), BYU Radio, and other internet-exclusive radio services.
