= Cheryl Sorenson =

American basketball coach

Biographical details
- Born: March 18, 1980 (age 45); Portland, Oregon

Playing career
- 1998–2003: Washington

Coaching career (HC unless noted)
- 2003–2004: Eastside Catholic
- 2004–2007: Bellevue CC
- 2007–2011: Eastern Washington (asst.)
- 2011–2014: Portland (asst.)
- 2014–2019: Portland

Head coaching record
- Overall: 33–117 (.220)

Cheryl Elaine Sorenson (born March 18, 1980) was the women's basketball head coach for the Portland Pilots. In March 2019, Sorenson and the University of Portland parted ways.

== Early life ==
Sorenson was born to Linda and Charles Sorenson in Portland, Oregon, and she was the youngest of two children. She attended Clackamas High School where she competed in varsity basketball, volleyball, and track on the varsity team. While at Clackamas, Sorenson would be named to the Street and Smith's Honorable mention All-American basketball team during her junior season and the USA Today Honorable Mention team during her senior season. Sorenson would finish with 1,968 points, a 20.0 points per game average, and would leave holding seven school basketball records at Clackamas.

Sorenson would receive a scholarship to play basketball at the University of Washington, the same university both of her parents had attended. Sorenson would be a key figure for the Huskies from 1998 to 2003. While a freshman Sorenson would play in 28 games off the bench and averaged 10 minutes a game. For the season she would go 12–16 from the foul line with 33 assists and 10 steals. The Huskies would make it to the second round of the WNIT.

Sorenson's sophomore year would be cut short as she suffered a torn ACL in October practice. After surgery in November, Sorenson was granted a medical redshirt.

Sorenson would return to the team for the 2000–01 season, her sophomore year. Sorenson would play in 27 games, averaging 15 minutes a game, a knee injury near the end of the season forced Sorenson to miss four games, but the Huskies would make the NCAA Tournament.

For her junior season Sorenson was elected one of the team's co-captains. Sorenson would play in 30 of the team's 31 games, including 4 starts. She was elected as the KOMO Radio co-Outstanding Defensive Player of the year. The Huskies would also return to play in the WNIT

For her senior season Sorenson would once again assume captain responsibilities. Sorenson would play in 28 of the team's games and make a trip to the NCAA Tournament for the second time. Her senior season would be the lowest in terms of production. Sorenson would average playing 3 minutes per game with 2.1 points and 2 rebounds per game. Sorenson would leave the Huskies having played in 113 games with 104 made field goals, 57 free throws, 244 rebounds, 97 assists, 124 turnovers, 4 blocks, and 53 steals. During her five years at Washington, Sorenson would score only 289 points, 91 of which came during her freshman season. Sorenson would graduate from Washington with degrees in both psychology and communications.

=== Washington statistics ===
Legend
GP	Games played	GS	Games started	MPG	Minutes per game
FG%	Field goal percentage	3P%	3-point field goal percentage	FT%	Free throw percentage
RPG	Rebounds per game	APG	Assists per game	SPG	Steals per game
BPG	Blocks per game	PPG	Points per game	**Bold**	Career high

Year	Team	GP	Points	FG%	3P%	FT%	RPG	APG	SPG	BPG	PPG
1998–99	Washington	28	**91**	**41.1%**	37.5%	50.0%	2.0	0.5	0.4	**0.1**	**3.3**
1999–00	Washington	Medical redshirt									
2000–01	Washington	27	63	36.9%	**46.2%**	56.3%	1.7	0.5	0.3	-	2.3
2001–02	Washington	**30**	75	28.0%	15.0%	74.1%	**2.9**	**1.5**	**0.8**	0.0	2.5
2002–03	Washington	29	60	34.0%	41.2%	**68.0%**	2.0	0.7	0.3	0.0	2.1
Career		114	289	34.9%	102.8%	71.4%	29.0	0.9	0.5	0.0	2.5

== Coaching ==
After graduation Sorenson began working as a sales representative for Baden in Federal Way. She also became the varsity girls head basketball coach for at Eastside Catholic High School in Bellevue, Washington. After one season at Eastside Sorenson would be hired as the head coach position at Bellevue Community College, where she would coach Bellevue from 2004–2007. The first season (2004–05) at Bellevue would be difficult as the team would win only 4 games (4–24). By her second season, the team had adapted Sorenson's ideas. Bellevue would jump up to 22 wins (22–7), and in 2006–07 they would go 26–5. Sorenson would be named the NWAACC North Division Coach of the Year in both the 2006 and 2007 seasons.

After the 2007 season Sorenson would be hired by the Eastern Washington Eagles to serve as an assistant basketball coach and act as recruiting coordinator. While at Eastern Washington, the Eagles would win the 2010 Big Sky Championship regular season. Under her tutelage, Julie Piper would become the first Eastern Washington player to win the Big Sky's Most Valuable Player award, and Brianne Ryan would make the conference's first team squad. The Eagles would post a record of 46–74 during Sorenson's time with them (4–25 in 2007–08, 10–19 in 2008–09, 19–12 in 2009–10 with a WNIT birth, and 13–18 in 2010–11).

Sorenson would be hired as an assistant coach by the Portland Pilots for the 2011–12 season where she would serve for three years before becoming head coach. Sorenson would act as the team's second assistant coach. While as an assistant, the Pilots Pilots would post a record of 37–56, but improvement would be made each season (12–20 in 2011–12, 11–20 in 2012–13, and 14–16 in 2013–14).

On April 17, 2014, Sorenson would be named the Pilots fifth head coach in the programs 34-year history. Sorenson and the Pilots parted ways in 2019.

== Division I Head coaching record ==
Statistics overview
Season	Team	Overall	Conference	Standing	Postseason
Portland Pilots (WCC) (2014–2019)
2014–15	Portland	4–26	2–16	8th	
2015–16	Portland	3–27	1–17	10th	
2016–17	Portland	6–24	4–14	10th	
2017–18	Portland	7–23	3–15	10th	
2018–19	Portland	13–17	5–13	8th	
Portland:		33–117 (.220)	15–75 (.167)		
Total:		33–117 (.220)			
National champion Postseason invitational champion Conference regular season champion Conference regular season and conference tournament champion Division regular season champion Division regular season and conference tournament champion Conference tournament champion
