= BYU Television International =

Cable and satellite television channel

- Country: United States
- Broadcast area: Latin America, Iberian Peninsula, Worldwide
- Network: BYU TV
- Headquarters: Provo, Utah, United States

Programming
- Languages: Spanish and Portuguese

Ownership
- Owner: Brigham Young University

History
- Launched: March 2007
- Closed: June 30, 2018

Links
- Website: www.byutv.org

Brigham Young University Television International (BYUtv International) was a Utah-based cable and satellite television channel that broadcast throughout the American continents and parts of Europe free of charge. Its headquarters were located on the Brigham Young University campus in Provo, Utah. It was founded in 2007 and shut down in 2018. As of January 2013, BYUtv International was available to 6.7 million households. Its content was available in Spanish and Portuguese and focused on world cultures, families, and doctrine from The Church of Jesus Christ of Latter-day Saints. The channel, run by station manager Saul Leal, was nominated for 11 Emmy awards, winning five. Its slogan was “discovering cultures, inspiring lives.”

== History ==
BYUtv International started as a result of a request to provide BYUtv's content in Spanish and Portuguese. A translation team was brought on in 2008, and in 2009 it started producing original content.

On June 30, 2018, BYUtv International ceased operations.

== Programming ==
BYUtv International provided 24-hour programming in both Spanish and Portuguese. 25% of its content was original and the rest came from popular television channels. All of its content, whether original or not, was translated into Spanish and Portuguese and voiced over by BYU students, professionals, and local third party translation companies.

=== Nexos ===
Nexos was a weekly program about arts, culture, news, technology, lifestyle and community. “Nexos” is Spanish for “links” or “linking” and tries to connect different cultures. It was hosted by Brigham Young University students and reporters from Latin America and was specifically geared towards Latin American youth, although it was watched by people of all ages. It was broadcast to Latin America in both Spanish and Portuguese. It won an Emmy in the fall of 2011 and won its second Telly in the beginning of 2012.

=== Conexão ===
This show included a variety of stories, interviews and segments about topics such as best of web, music, fashion, arts, culture and sports, among others. It was produced in Portuguese and hosted by Brigham Young University students from Brazil. Its cast has produced episodes in the Brazilian cities of Rio de Janeiro and Florianópolis, and also in Utah. Its content focused mainly on Brazil and its culture. It was awarded an Emmy in 2012 for Arts/Entertainment.

=== Entrepreneurs ===
Entrepreneurs was a show designed to teach how to start and maintain a business. The show was intended for aspiring entrepreneurs who need direction and tips on how to make it in the business world. Successful entrepreneurs who know the business worlds of Latin America and the United States were interviewed and gave suggestions on how to be successful in business. It also encouraged youth to give back to their community as they are able.

=== Community Heroes ===
This program aimed to help viewers become aware of how people are doing good in their communities and around the world. It told the stories of Latin American individuals and their communities, showing their lifestyles and how they impact those around them. It encouraged viewers to engage in their communities and serve others. It was awarded an Emmy in 2012 for Human Interest.

=== Hidden Treasures ===
This show consisted of several mini-series; each focused on a specific country and filmed in docu-performance style. It showed real musicians and artists and included live performances of their music. Some of the groups and individuals featured on this show included Trio Miramar (a Mexican guitar group), Edgar Leónides (a Colombian bard and music teacher), and the Mexican percussion group Os Tamborileiros de Linares.

=== Grandma’s Kitchen ===
This show highlighted Latin American grandmothers, who shared their special recipes and showed viewers how to make traditional dishes in various countries throughout Latin America. This series showed how the dishes are prepared, starting at the market where the ingredients are bought and ending at the dinner table where the host and the grandmother featured eat the meal they have made. It was awarded an Emmy in 2012 for History/Culture.

=== Sports ===
BYUtv International covered the Brigham Young University American football, soccer, volleyball, basketball, baseball, softball, and gymnastics teams. It provided live commentary in Spanish and Portuguese. It was produced by BYUtv International in conjunction with BYUtv and was broadcast to Latin America. It was awarded an Emmy in 2012 for Sports.

=== Against All Odds ===
This family game show involved parents and children as they compete in various challenges testing how well they know each other. Questions vary from text messaging to trivia about each other's life. It was broadcast throughout Latin America in both Spanish and Portuguese.

== Emmys ==
BYUtv International has been nominated for 11 Emmys and has won 5. The following original shows have won Emmys:

=== Conexão ===
Emmy Category: Arts/Entertainment

Type: Program/Special

Producer: Luiz Malaman

Executive Producer: Saul Leal

=== Grandma’s Kitchen (La Cocina de la Abuela) ===
Emmy Category: Historic/Cultural

Type: Program Feature/Segment or Program/Special

Executive Producers: Luiz Malaman and Saul Leal

=== Community Heroes (Heroes de La Comunidad) ===
Emmy Category: Human Interest

Type: Program Feature/Segment or Program/Special

Executive Producers: Luiz Malaman and Saul Leal

=== Football – Fall Season (Spanish/Portuguese Coverage) ===
Emmy Category: Sporting Event/Game

Type: Live/Unedited

Producers: Luiz Malaman and Mikel Minor

Executive Producer: Saul Leal

== Staff ==
BYUtv International started in 2007 with just one employee, Saul Leal. In 2008 the channel added a producer, and in 2008 a translation department was added. The post production manager was hired in 2008 and a voice over department was added in 2008. The distribution department was added in 2008.

BYUtv International's full-time employees worked closely with the student employees, giving them feedback and mentoring during their time with the channel.
