= Campus Insiders =

Former college sports website and internet television service

Campus Insiders was a college sports website and internet television service. It was owned by a joint venture between IMG College and Silver Chalice.

The service was oriented towards live streaming of U.S. college sports, streaming live and replay broadcasts of events from selected conferences that are not picked up for television, as well as other original content. It was based out of studios in Chicago, Illinois in the former Harpo Studios building, alongside sister operation 120 Sports.

On April 13, 2017, Sinclair Broadcast Group, Silver Chalice, and 120 Sports announced that they would merge Campus Insiders, 120 Sports, and Sinclair's syndication service and linear digital television channel American Sports Network into a new multi-platform service known as Stadium. The Campus Insiders name continues to be used by Stadium for a college sports studio show aired by the network.

== Programming ==
Campus Insiders had deals to stream events from the Mountain West Conference, the Patriot League, the West Coast Conference, and the Central Intercollegiate Athletic Association, streaming a total of over 3000 events per-season. Campus Insiders operated branded digital networks for each of its partner conferences (such as the Mountain West Network, Patriot League Network, and TheW.tv). The service also partnered with Sling TV and Twitter to distribute their broadcasts via their respective services. Campus Insiders previously produced content for the Atlantic 10 Conference and the University of Oregon. All rights have now moved to Stadium.

In 2016, Campus Insiders acquired digital rights to the newly established Arizona Bowl, which was streamed online in simulcast with American Sports Network's television broadcast, and with exclusive online pre-game, halftime, and post-game shows produced by 120 Sports.
