= 2015–16 Montana State Bobcats women's basketball team =

Intercollegiate basketball season

2015–16 Montana State Bobcats women's basketball
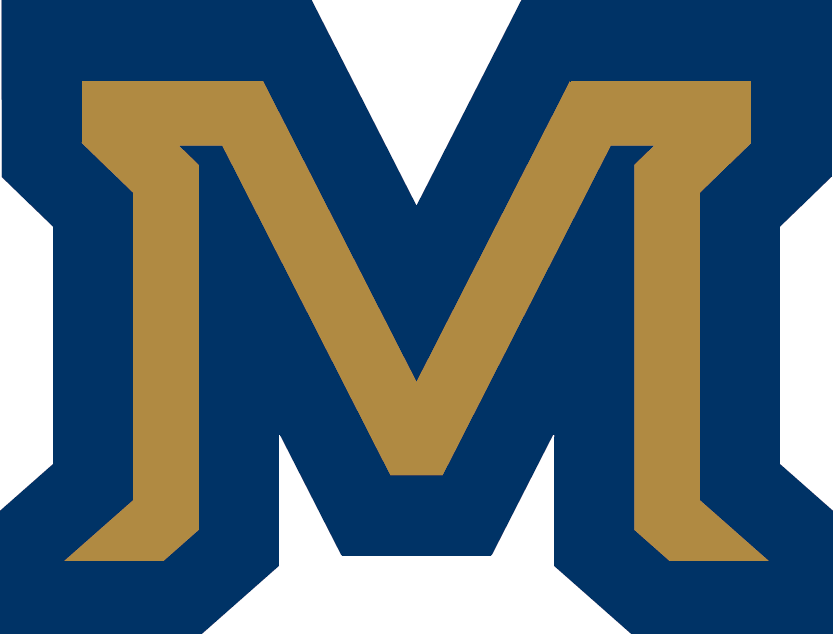

Big Sky Regular Season Champions

WNIT, First Round
- Conference: Big Sky Conference
- Record: 21–10 (14–4 Big Sky)
- Head coach: Tricia Binford (10th season)
- Assistant coaches: Nate Harris; Kati Burrows; John Stockton
- Home arena: Worthington Arena

2015–16 Big Sky women's basketball standings
	Conf.				Overall
Team	W		L	PCT	W		L	PCT
Montana State	14	–	4	.778	21	–	10	.677
Idaho †	13	–	5	.722	24	–	10	.706
Eastern Washington	13	–	5	.722	20	–	12	.625
North Dakota	13	–	5	.722	19	–	14	.576
Montana	12	–	6	.667	20	–	11	.645
Weber State	11	–	7	.611	23	–	12	.657
Sacramento State	10	–	8	.556	14	–	17	.452
Idaho State	8	–	10	.444	18	–	15	.545
Northern Colorado	8	–	10	.444	13	–	16	.448
Northern Arizona	2	–	16	.111	6	–	24	.200
Southern Utah	2	–	16	.111	5	–	25	.167
Portland State	2	–	16	.111	4	–	26	.133
† 2016 Big Sky tournament winner As of March 26, 2016; Rankings from AP poll

The 2015–16 Montana State Bobcats women's basketball team represented Montana State University during the 2015–16 NCAA Division I women's basketball season. The Bobcats, led by tenth year head coach Tricia Binford, played their home games at Worthington Arena and were members of the Big Sky Conference. They finished the season 21–10, 14–4 in Big Sky play to win the Big Sky regular season championship. They lost in the quarterfinals of the Big Sky women's tournament where they lost to Idaho State. As champs of the Big Sky Conference who failed to win their conference tournament, they received an automatic bid to the Women's National Invitation Tournament where they lost to Utah in the first round.

John Stockton, the NBA's all-time leader in assists and steals, and a member of the Naismith Memorial Basketball Hall of Fame, joined as an assistant coach to replace Kellee Barney. Barney left the program to pursue a career in business, and Stockton had previously coached four of the players on the MSU women's team during Amateur Athletic Union leagues.

== Roster ==
2015–16 Montana State Bobcats women's basketball team
Players
Coaches

Pos.	#	Name	Height	Year	Previous school	Hometown
G	2	Peyton Ferris	5 ft 9 in (1.75 m)	RS Jr	Twin Bridges HS	Twin Bridges, Montana
F	3	Annika Lai	6 ft 1 in (1.85 m)	Fr	Fairview HS	Boulder, Colorado
G	10	Margreet Barhoum	5 ft 6 in (1.68 m)	RS Jr	Meadowdale HS	Edmonds, Washington
G	11	Lindsay Stockton	5 ft 6 in (1.68 m)	Sr	Gonzaga Prep	Spokane, Washington
G	12	Delany Junkermier	6 ft 0 in (1.83 m)	So	Mead HS	Spokane, Washington
F	13	Ashton Siegner	6 ft 1 in (1.85 m)	RS Fr	West Albany HS	Albany, Oregon
G	14	Michelle Seitz	5 ft 6 in (1.68 m)	Sr	Nezperce HS; Walla Walla CC	Nezperce, Idaho
F	15	Riley Nordgaard	5 ft 10 in (1.78 m)	RS Jr	Canby HS; Augustana College	Canby, Minnesota
F	22	Alexa Dawkins	6 ft 1 in (1.85 m)	Sr	Bozeman HS	Bozeman, Montana
G	23	Hannah Caudill	5 ft 7 in (1.7 m)	Jr	Gonzaga Prep	Spokane, Washington
G	24	Madisyn Shaide	5 ft 7 in (1.7 m)	Fr	Big Sky HS	Missoula, Montana
G	30	Rebekah Hatchard	5 ft 8 in (1.73 m)	Jr	Windsor Gardens Vocational College; Seward CC	Adelaide, Australia
F	33	Amy Davis	6 ft 1 in (1.85 m)	So	Bozeman HS	Bozeman, Montana
F	34	Jasmine Hommes	6 ft 1 in (1.85 m)	Sr	Lynden Christian	Lynden, Washington
C	44	Haley Blodgett	6 ft 3 in (1.91 m)	RS Fr	Golden HS	Golden, Colorado

Head coach

- Tricia Binford (Boise State)

Assistant coach(es)

- Nate Harris (Montana Tech)
- Kati Burrows (Montana State)
- John Stockton (Gonzaga)

Legend

- (C) Team captain
- (S) Suspended
- (I) Ineligible
- (W) Walk-on
- Injured
- Current redshirt

Roster

== Schedule ==
Date time, TV	Rank^{#}	Opponent^{#}	Result	Record	Site (attendance) city, state
Exhibition
11/04/2015*; 7:00 pm		Montana Tech	W 79–51		Worthington Arena; Bozeman, Montana
Non-conference regular season
11/13/2015*; 5:30 pm		at Seattle	W 80–51	1–0	KeyArena; Seattle, Washington
11/15/2015*; 3:00 pm		at Nevada	W 66–53	2–0	Lawlor Events Center (897); Reno, Nevada
11/20/2015*; 5:30 pm		Portland	W 86–57	3–0	Worthington Arena (1,192); Bozeman, Montana
11/24/2015*; 8:00 pm		San Diego	L 49–62	3–1	Worthington Arena (709); Bozeman, Montana
11/27/2015*; 6:00 pm		vs. Evansville; Cal Poly/ShareSLO Holiday Tournament	W 81–55	4–1	Mott Athletic Center (105); San Luis Obispo, California
11/28/2015*; 6:00 pm		at Cal Poly; Cal Poly/ShareSLO Holiday Tournament	L 57–66	4–2	Mott Athletic Center (1,348); San Luis Obispo, California
12/03/2015*; 7:00 pm		Cal State Fullerton	W 89–66	5–2	Worthington Arena (1,068); Bozeman, Montana
12/06/2015*; 3:00 pm		at Gonzaga	L 52–65	5–3	McCarthey Athletic Center (6,000); Spokane, Washington
12/15/2015*; 7:00 pm		Montana–Western	W 74–36	6–3	Worthington Arena (984); Bozeman, Montana
12/19/2015*; 5:00 pm		at Wyoming	L 69–75 ^{OT}	6–4	Arena-Auditorium (2,521); Laramie, Wyoming
12/21/2015*; 7:00 pm		Carroll (MT)	W 74–34	7–4	Worthington Arena (1,352); Bozeman, Montana
Big Sky regular season
12/31/2015; 2:00 pm		Southern Utah	W 86–59	8–4 (1–0)	Worthington Arena (1,223); Bozeman, Montana
01/02/2016; 2:00 pm		Northern Arizona	W 86–77 ^{OT}	9–4 (2–0)	Worthington Arena (1,238); Bozeman, Montana
01/07/2016; 8:00 pm		at Sacramento State	W 80–79	10–4 (3–0)	Hornets Nest (315); Sacramento, California
01/09/2016; 3:00 pm		at Portland State	W 106–59	11–4 (4–0)	Peter Stott Center (260); Portland, Oregon
01/14/2016; 7:00 pm		North Dakota	W 69–61	12–4 (5–0)	Worthington Arena (1,284); Bozeman, Montana
01/16/2016; 2:00 pm		Northern Colorado	W 66–58	13–4 (6–0)	Worthington Arena (1,493); Bozeman, Montana
01/21/2016; 7:00 pm		at Eastern Washington	L 69–81	13–5 (6–1)	Reese Court (885); Cheney, Washington
01/23/2016; 3:00 pm		at Idaho	W 62–59	14–5 (7–1)	Cowan Spectrum (874); Moscow, Idaho
01/30/2016; 2:00 pm		Montana	W 61–52	15–5 (8–1)	Worthington Arena (3,526); Bozeman, Montana
02/04/2016; 7:00 pm		Portland State	W 74–64	16–5 (9–1)	Worthington Arena (1,221); Bozeman, Montana
02/06/2016; 2:00 pm		Sacramento State	W 116–99	17–5 (10–1)	Worthington Arena (1,678); Bozeman, Montana
02/11/2016; 7:00 pm		at Northern Arizona	W 83–72	18–5 (11–1)	Walkup Skydome (503); Flagstaff, Arizona
02/13/2015; 7:00 pm		at Southern Utah	W 87–66	19–5 (12–1)	Centrum Arena (1,211); Cedar City, Utah
02/20/2016; 2:00 pm		at Montana	L 66–70	19–6 (12–2)	Dahlberg Arena (4,249); Missoula, Montana
02/25/2016; 8:00 pm		Weber State	W 92–71	20–6 (13–2)	Worthington Arena (1,452); Bozeman, Montana
02/27/2016; 8:00 pm		Idaho State	W 82–80 ^{OT}	21–6 (14–2)	Worthington Arena (2,139); Bozeman, Montana
03/02/2016; 7:00 pm		at Northern Colorado	L 73–80	21–7 (14–3)	Bank of Colorado Arena (890); Greeley, Colorado
03/04/2016; 1:00 pm		at North Dakota	L 76–77	21–8 (14–4)	Betty Engelstad Sioux Center (1,671); Grand Forks, North Dakota
Big Sky Women's Tournament
03/09/2016; 1:05 pm		vs. Idaho State; Quarterfinals	L 50–52	21–9	Reno Events Center (1,104); Reno, Nevada
WNIT
03/18/2016*; 7:00 pm		at Utah; First Round	L 61–95	21–10	Jon M. Huntsman Center (1,239); Salt Lake City, Utah
*Non-conference game. ^{#}Rankings from AP Poll. (#) Tournament seedings in parentheses. All times are in Mountain Time.

== See also ==
2015–16 Montana State Bobcats men's basketball team
