= 2015–16 Montana Lady Griz basketball team =

Intercollegiate basketball season

2015–16 Montana Lady Griz basketball

Lady Griz Classic champions
- Conference: Big Sky Conference
- Record: 20–11 (12–6 Big Sky)
- Head coach: Robin Selvig (38th season)
- Assistant coaches: Shannon Schweyen; Trish Duce; Sonya Rogers
- Home arena: Dahlberg Arena

2015–16 Big Sky women's basketball standings
	Conf.				Overall
Team	W		L	PCT	W		L	PCT
Montana State	14	–	4	.778	21	–	10	.677
Idaho †	13	–	5	.722	24	–	10	.706
Eastern Washington	13	–	5	.722	20	–	12	.625
North Dakota	13	–	5	.722	19	–	14	.576
Montana	12	–	6	.667	20	–	11	.645
Weber State	11	–	7	.611	23	–	12	.657
Sacramento State	10	–	8	.556	14	–	17	.452
Idaho State	8	–	10	.444	18	–	15	.545
Northern Colorado	8	–	10	.444	13	–	16	.448
Northern Arizona	2	–	16	.111	6	–	24	.200
Southern Utah	2	–	16	.111	5	–	25	.167
Portland State	2	–	16	.111	4	–	26	.133
† 2016 Big Sky tournament winner As of March 26, 2016; Rankings from AP poll

The 2015–16 Montana Lady Griz basketball team represented the University of Montana during the 2015–16 NCAA Division I women's basketball season. The Lady Griz, led by thirty-eighth year head coach Robin Selvig, played their home games at Dahlberg Arena and were members of the Big Sky Conference. They finished the season 20–11, 12–6 in Big Sky play to finish in fifth place. They advanced to the quarterfinals of the Big Sky women's tournament, where they lost to North Dakota. Despite having 20 wins, they were not invited to a postseason tournament.

== Roster ==
2015–16 Montana Lady Griz women's basketball team
Players
Coaches

Pos.	#	Name	Height	Year	Previous school	Hometown
G	00	Maddie Keast	5 ft 9 in (1.75 m)	RS Fr	Sentinel HS	Missoula, Montana
G	3	Haley Vining	5 ft 7 in (1.7 m)	RS Sr	Charles M. Russell HS	Great Falls, Montana
G	4	Sierra Anderson	5 ft 6 in (1.68 m)	RS Fr	Henry M. Jackson HS	Mill Creek, Washington
G	5	McCalle Feller	5 ft 10 in (1.78 m)	Sr	Fergus HS	Lewistown, Montana
F	10	Kayleigh Valley	5 ft 11 in (1.8 m)	Jr	University HS	Spokane, Washington
F	11	Rachel Staudacher	6 ft 1 in (1.85 m)	RS Jr	Cedar Park Christian	Bothell, Washington
F	13	Alycia Sims	6 ft 3 in (1.91 m)	Jr	Stevensville HS	Stevensville, Montana
G	20	Hannah Doran	5 ft 11 in (1.8 m)	RS Sr	Crescent Valley HS	Corvallis, Oregon
F	22	Mekayla Isaak	6 ft 1 in (1.85 m)	RS So	Bend HS	Bend, Oregon
G	23	Taylor Goligoski	5 ft 8 in (1.73 m)	Fr	Hamilton HS	Hamilton, Montana
C	31	Henny Hearn	6 ft 2 in (1.88 m)	Fr	Century HS	Pocatello, Idaho
G	32	McKenzie Johnston	5 ft 7 in (1.7 m)	Fr	Capital HS	Helena, Montana
G	42	Shanae Gilham	5 ft 10 in (1.78 m)	RS Jr	Bozeman HS	Browning, Montana

Head coach

- Robin Selvig (Montana)

Assistant coach(es)

- Shannon Schweyen (Montana)
- Trish Duce (Montana)
- Sonya Rogers (Montana)

Legend

- (C) Team captain
- (S) Suspended
- (I) Ineligible
- (W) Walk-on
- Injured
- Current redshirt

Roster

== Schedule ==
Date time, TV	Rank^{#}	Opponent^{#}	Result	Record	Site (attendance) city, state
Exhibition
11/04/2015*; 7:00 pm		Carroll (MT)	W 59–54		Dahlberg Arena; Missoula, Montana
11/09/2015*; 7:00 pm		Great Falls	W 81–52		Dahlberg Arena; Missoula, Montana
Non-conference regular season
11/15/2015*; 1:00 pm		Seattle	L 44–58	0–1	Dahlberg Arena (2,462); Missoula, Montana
11/17/2015*; 7:00 pm		Montana–Western	W 80–32	1–1	Dahlberg Arena (2,262); Missoula, Montana
11/19/2015*; 7:00 pm		Pacific	W 64–54	2–1	Dahlberg Arena (2,246); Missoula, Montana
11/22/2015*; 1:00 pm		Portland	W 90–67	3–1	Dahlberg Arena (2,372); Missoula, Montana
11/28/2015*; 2:00 pm		at Lehigh; Lehigh Christmas City Classic semifinals	L 53–80	3–2	Stabler Arena (667); Bethlehem, Pennsylvania
11/29/2015*; 10:00 am		vs. Drexel; Lehigh Christmas City Classic 3rd place game	W 58–50	4–2	Stabler Arena (234); Bethlehem, Pennsylvania
12/06/2015*; 1:00 pm		Cal State Northridge	W 86–51	5–2	Dahlberg Arena (2,276); Missoula, Montana
12/10/2015*; 7:00 pm		at Colorado State	L 44–75	5–3	Moby Arena (1,127); Fort Collins, Colorado
12/12/2015*; 2:00 pm		at Wyoming	L 61–68	5–4	Arena-Auditorium (2,440); Laramie, Wyoming
12/19/2015*; 3:30 pm		Florida Atlantic; 35th Lady Griz Classic semifinals	W 83–69	6–4	Dahlberg Arena (2,365); Missoula, Montana
12/20/2015*; 3:30 pm		Utah State; 35th Lady Griz Classic championship	W 86–70	7–4	Dahlberg Arena (2,404); Missoula, Montana
Big Sky regular season
12/31/2015; 4:00 pm		Northern Arizona	W 81–58	8–4 (1–0)	Dahlberg Arena (2,787); Missoula, Montana
01/02/2016; 2:00 pm		Southern Utah	W 66–60	9–4 (2–0)	Dahlberg Arena (3,024); Missoula, Montana
01/07/2016; 8:00 pm		at Portland State	W 79–58	10–4 (3–0)	Peter Stott Center (293); Portland, Oregon
01/09/2016; 3:00 pm		at Sacramento State	L 75–83 ^{OT}	10–5 (3–1)	Hornets Nest (389); Sacramento, California
01/14/2016; 7:00 pm		Northern Colorado	W 58–46	11–5 (4–1)	Dahlberg Arena (2,638); Missoula, Montana
01/16/2016; 2:00 pm		North Dakota	L 59–61	11–6 (4–2)	Dahlberg Arena (2,985); Missoula, Montana
01/21/2016; 7:00 pm		at Idaho	L 61–78	11–7 (4–3)	Cowan Spectrum (1,021); Moscow, Idaho
01/23/2016; 3:00 pm		at Eastern Washington	L 65–67	11–8 (4–4)	Reese Court (1,055); Cheney, Washington
01/30/2016; 2:00 pm, Cowles		at Montana State	L 52–61	11–9 (4–5)	Worthington Arena (3,526); Bozeman, Montana
02/04/2016; 7:00 pm		Sacramento State	W 90–83	12–9 (5–5)	Dahlberg Arena (2,919); Missoula, Montana
02/06/2016; 2:00 pm		Portland State	W 76–57	13–9 (6–5)	Dahlberg Arena (2,973); Missoula, Montana
02/11/2016; 7:00 pm		at Southern Utah	W 81–50	14–9 (7–5)	Centrum Arena (426); Cedar City, Utah
02/13/2016; 5:30 pm		at Northern Arizona	W 61–57	15–9 (8–5)	Walkup Skydome (482); Flagstaff, Arizona
02/20/2016; 2:00 pm, Cowles		Montana State	W 70–66	16–9 (9–5)	Dahlberg Arena (4,249); Missoula, Montana
02/25/2016; 7:00 pm		Idaho State	W 62–47	17–9 (10–5)	Dahlberg Arena (3,708); Missoula, Montana
02/27/2016; 2:00 pm		Weber State	W 84–75	18–9 (11–5)	Dahlberg Arena (3,257); Missoula, Montana
03/02/2016; 6:00 pm		at North Dakota	L 61–73	18–10 (11–6)	Betty Engelstad Sioux Center (1,677); Grand Forks, North Dakota
03/04/2016; 2:00 pm		at Northern Colorado	W 72–66 ^{OT}	19–10 (12–6)	Bank of Colorado Arena (790); Greeley, Colorado
Big Sky Women's Tournament
03/07/2016; 3:35 pm		vs. Northern Arizona; First Round	W 78–63	20–10	Reno Events Center (277); Reno, Nevada
03/09/2016; 3:35 pm		vs. North Dakota; Quarterfinals	L 62–65	20–11	Reno Events Center (1,263); Reno, Nevada
*Non-conference game. ^{#}Rankings from AP Poll. (#) Tournament seedings in parentheses. All times are in Mountain Time.

== See also ==
- 2015–16 Montana Grizzlies basketball team
