= 2015–16 Southern Utah Thunderbirds women's basketball team =

Intercollegiate basketball season

2015–16 Southern Utah Thunderbirds women's basketball
- Conference: Big Sky Conference
- Record: 5–25 (2–16 Big Sky)
- Head coach: Chris Boettcher (2nd season)
- Assistant coaches: Kim Beeston; Dionisio Gomez; Robert Yonce
- Home arena: Centrum Arena

2015–16 Big Sky women's basketball standings
| | Conf. | | | | Overall |
| Team | W | | L | PCT | W | | L | PCT |
|---|---|---|---|---|---|---|---|---|
| Montana State | 14 | – | 4 | .778 | 21 | – | 10 | .677 |
| Idaho † | 13 | – | 5 | .722 | 24 | – | 10 | .706 |
| Eastern Washington | 13 | – | 5 | .722 | 20 | – | 12 | .625 |
| North Dakota | 13 | – | 5 | .722 | 19 | – | 14 | .576 |
| Montana | 12 | – | 6 | .667 | 20 | – | 11 | .645 |
| Weber State | 11 | – | 7 | .611 | 23 | – | 12 | .657 |
| Sacramento State | 10 | – | 8 | .556 | 14 | – | 17 | .452 |
| Idaho State | 8 | – | 10 | .444 | 18 | – | 15 | .545 |
| Northern Colorado | 8 | – | 10 | .444 | 13 | – | 16 | .448 |
| Northern Arizona | 2 | – | 16 | .111 | 6 | – | 24 | .200 |
| Southern Utah | 2 | – | 16 | .111 | 5 | – | 25 | .167 |
| Portland State | 2 | – | 16 | .111 | 4 | – | 26 | .133 |
† 2016 Big Sky tournament winner As of March 26, 2016; Rankings from AP poll

The 2015–16 Southern Utah Thunderbirds women's basketball team represented Southern Utah University during the 2015–16 NCAA Division I women's basketball season. The T–Birds, were led by second year head coach Chris Boettcher and played their home games at Centrum Arena. They were members of the Big Sky Conference. They finished the season 5–25, 2–16 in Big Sky play to finish in a 3 way tie for tenth place. They lost in the first round of the Big Sky women's tournament to Sacramento State.

== Roster ==
2015–16 Southern Utah Thunderbirds women's basketball team
Players
Coaches

| Pos. | # | Name | Height | Year | Previous school | Hometown |
|---|---|---|---|---|---|---|
| G | 4 | Ashleigh Munns | 5 ft 9 in (1.75 m) | Sr | SEEVIC College | Basildon, Essex, England |
| F | 10 | Taylor Baird | 6 ft 1 in (1.85 m) | So | Glacier Peak | Snohomish, WA |
| G | 12 | Kristine Conley | 5 ft 8 in (1.73 m) | Jr | Weber | Ogden, UT |
| G | 14 | Breanu Reid | 5 ft 7 in (1.7 m) | Fr | Piedmont | Oklahoma City, OK |
| F | 15 | Emma Weinreich | 6 ft 1 in (1.85 m) | Sr | Arroyo Grande; Allan Hancock College | Pismo Beach, CA |
| F | 21 | Donna Koerber | 5 ft 11 in (1.8 m) | Sr | St. Joseph; College of DuPage | Bensenville, IL |
| G/F | 22 | Tiffany Dunlap | 5 ft 11 in (1.8 m) | Fr | Prestonwood Christian Academy | Plano, TX |
| F | 24 | Tiarra Mcdonald | 5 ft 10 in (1.78 m) | Fr | Northside | Fort Smith, AR |
| G | 30 | Maren Herrud | 5 ft 11 in (1.8 m) | Fr | Highland | Pocatello, ID |
| G | 34 | Sarah McGee | 5 ft 11 in (1.8 m) | So | Black Hills | Tumwater, WA |
| F | 40 | Darri Frandsen | 6 ft 1 in (1.85 m) | Fr | Panguitch | Panguitch, UT |
| F | 43 | Jessica Richardson | 5 ft 11 in (1.8 m) | Jr | Davis | Kaysville, UT |
| G | 55 | Jamie Smith | 5 ft 7 in (1.7 m) | Jr | Riverton; USU–Eastern | Riverton, UT |

Head coach

- Chris Boettcher (BYU)

Assistant coach(es)

- Kim Beeston (BYU)
- Dionisio Gomez (Arkansas)
- Robert Yonce (Tennessee)

Legend

- (C) Team captain
- (S) Suspended
- (I) Ineligible
- (W) Walk-on
- Injured
- Current redshirt

Roster

== Schedule ==
| Date time, TV | Rank^{#} | Opponent^{#} | Result | Record | Site (attendance) city, state |
Exhibition
| 11/05/2015*; 7:00 pm, SUTV-9 | | CSU–Pueblo | L 51–74 | | Centrum Arena (500); Cedar City, UT |
| 11/09/2015*; 7:00 pm, SUTV-9 | | Hope International | L 64–75 | | Centrum Arena (556); Cedar City, UT |
Non-conference regular season
| 11/14/2015*; 4:00 pm | | at UNLV | L 44–79 | 0–1 | Thomas & Mack Center (1,622); Paradise, NV |
| 11/17/2015*; 7:00 pm | | at Utah Valley | L 58–70 | 0–2 | UCCU Center (389); Orem, UT |
| 11/19/2015*; 7:00 pm, SUTV-9 | | UC Irvine | L 58–63 | 0–3 | Centrum Arena (531); Cedar City, UT |
| 11/24/2015*; 5:00 pm | | at New Mexico State | L 60–74 | 0–4 | Pan American Center (531); Las Cruces, NM |
| 11/27/2015*; 7:00 pm | | at New Mexico; UNM Thanksgiving Tournament semifinals | L 47–70 | 0–5 | The Pit (5,144); Albuquerque, NM |
| 11/28/2015*; 2:00 pm | | vs. North Carolina A&T; UNM Thanksgiving Tournament 3rd place game | L 65–78 | 0–6 | The Pit; Albquerque, NM |
| 12/01/2015*; 1:00 pm, SUTV-9 | | Cal State Northridge | W 67–65 | 1–6 | Centrum Arena (936); Cedar City, UT |
| 12/04/2015*; 5:00 pm | | at USC | L 32–71 | 1–7 | Lyon Center (492); Los Angeles, CA |
| 12/12/2015*; 6:30 pm | | Air Force | W 75–56 | 2–7 | Centrum Arena (465); Cedar City, UT |
| 12/20/2015*; 2:30 pm | | at TCU | L 47–76 | 2–8 | Schollmaier Arena (4,715); Fort Worth, TX |
| 12/28/2015*; 7:00 pm, SUTV-9 | | Bristol University | W 99–37 | 3–8 | Centrum Arena (355); Cedar City, UT |
Big Sky regular season
| 12/31/2015; 2:00 pm | | at Montana State | L 59–86 | 3–9 (0–1) | Worthington Arena (1,223); Bozeman, MT |
| 01/02/2016; 2:00 pm | | at Montana | L 60–66 | 3–10 (0–2) | Dahlberg Arena (3,024); Missoula, MT |
| 01/09/2016; 2:00 pm | | at Northern Arizona | L 48–57 | 3–11 (0–3) | Walkup Skydome (227); Flagstaff, AZ |
| 01/14/2016; 7:00 pm, SUTV-9 | | Eastern Washington | L 82–85 | 3–12 (0–4) | Centrum Arena (637); Cedar City, UT |
| 01/16/2016; 7:00 pm, SUTV-9 | | Idaho | L 51–62 | 3–13 (0–5) | Centrum Arena (558); Cedar City, UT |
| 01/21/2016; 7:00 pm | | at Northern Colorado | L 44–64 | 3–14 (0–6) | Bank of Colorado Arena (844); Greeley, CO |
| 01/23/2016; 1:00 pm, FCS | | at North Dakota | L 56–68 | 3–15 (0–7) | Betty Engelstad Sioux Center (2,077); Grand Forks, ND |
| 01/28/2016; 7:00 pm, SUTV-9 | | Idaho State | L 67–71 | 3–16 (0–8) | Centrum Arena (1,051); Cedar City, UT |
| 01/30/2016; 7:00 pm, SUTV-9 | | Weber State | L 51–70 | 3–17 (0–9) | Centrum Arena (815); Cedar City, UT |
| 02/04/2016; 6:00 pm | | at Idaho | L 48–93 | 3–18 (0–10) | Cowan Spectrum (674); Moscow, ID |
| 02/06/2016; 7:00 pm | | at Eastern Washington | L 53–64 | 3–19 (0–11) | Reese Court (789); Cheney, WA |
| 02/11/2016; 7:00 pm, SUTV-9 | | Montana | L 50–81 | 3–20 (0–12) | Centrum Arena (426); Cedar City, UT |
| 02/13/2016; 7:00 pm, SUTV-9 | | Montana State | L 66–87 | 3–21 (0–13) | Centrum Arena (1,211); Cedar City, UT |
| 02/18/2016; 7:00 pm | | at Weber State | L 56–75 | 3–22 (0–14) | Dee Events Center (607); Ogden, UT |
| 02/20/2016; 2:00 pm | | at Idaho State | L 47–64 | 3–23 (0–15) | Reed Gym (1,132); Pocatello, ID |
| 02/27/2016; 7:00 pm, SUTV-9 | | Northern Arizona | W 73–68 | 4–23 (1–15) | Centrum Arena (473); Cedar City, UT |
| 03/02/2016; 7:00 pm, SUTV-9 | | Sacramento State | L 72–82 | 4–24 (1–16) | Centrum Arena (487); Cedar City, UT |
| 03/04/2016; 7:00 pm, SUTV-9 | | Portland State | W 76–64 | 5–24 (2–16) | Centrum Arena (502); Cedar City, UT |
Big Sky Women's Tournament
| 03/07/2016; 6:35 pm | | vs. Sacramento State; First Round | L 89–102 | 5–25 | Reno Events Center (1,274); Reno, NV |
*Non-conference game. ^{#}Rankings from AP Poll. (#) Tournament seedings in parentheses. All times are in Mountain Time.

== See also ==
- 2015–16 Southern Utah Thunderbirds basketball team
