= 2015–16 Portland State Vikings women's basketball team =

Intercollegiate basketball season

2015–16 Portland State Vikings women's basketball
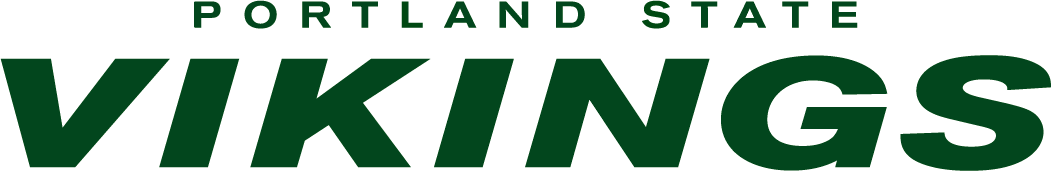
- Conference: Big Sky Conference
- Record: 4–26 (2–16 Big Sky)
- Head coach: Lynn Kennedy (1st season)
- Assistant coaches: Alison Hewa; Chelsey Zimmerman; Amy Denson
- Home arena: Peter Stott Center

2015–16 Big Sky women's basketball standings
	Conf.				Overall
Team	W		L	PCT	W		L	PCT
Montana State	14	–	4	.778	21	–	10	.677
Idaho †	13	–	5	.722	24	–	10	.706
Eastern Washington	13	–	5	.722	20	–	12	.625
North Dakota	13	–	5	.722	19	–	14	.576
Montana	12	–	6	.667	20	–	11	.645
Weber State	11	–	7	.611	23	–	12	.657
Sacramento State	10	–	8	.556	14	–	17	.452
Idaho State	8	–	10	.444	18	–	15	.545
Northern Colorado	8	–	10	.444	13	–	16	.448
Northern Arizona	2	–	16	.111	6	–	24	.200
Southern Utah	2	–	16	.111	5	–	25	.167
Portland State	2	–	16	.111	4	–	26	.133
† 2016 Big Sky tournament winner As of March 26, 2016; Rankings from AP poll

The 2015–16 Portland State Vikings women's basketball team represented Portland State University during the 2015–16 NCAA Division I women's basketball season. The Vikings, led by first-year head coach Lynn Kennedy, played their home games at the Peter Stott Center and were members of the Big Sky Conference. They finished the season 4–26, 2–16 in Big Sky play, to finish in a three-way tie for tenth place. They lost in the first round of the Big Sky women's tournament to Weber State.

== Roster ==
2015–16 Portland State Vikings women's basketball team
Players
Coaches

Pos.	#	Name	Height	Year	Previous school	Hometown
F	1	Danah Haley	6 ft 0 in (1.83 m)	Jr	Fairfax HS; Blue Mountain CC	Los Angeles, CA
F	4	Pia Jurhar	6 ft 3 in (1.91 m)	Fr	BRG XIX Krottenbachstraße	Vienna, Austria
G	5	Kian McNair	5 ft 6 in (1.68 m)	Fr	Salesian HS	Vallejo, CA
F	11	Cici West	5 ft 10 in (1.78 m)	So	Holy Names Academy	Seattle, WA
G	13	Bree Shepard	5 ft 7 in (1.7 m)	Fr	Helix HS	San Diego, CA
G	15	Corey James	5 ft 10 in (1.78 m)	Fr	West Albany HS	Albany, OR
G	20	Ashley Torres Negron	5 ft 8 in (1.73 m)	Jr	Highland CC	Morovis, Puerto Rico
C	21	Alicia Carline	6 ft 3 in (1.91 m)	Sr	Freyberg HS; Gillette College	Feilding, New Zealand
G	22	Montana Walters	5 ft 4 in (1.63 m)	RS So	Oregon City; Santa Clara	Oregon City, OR
G	23	Yaremi Mejia	5 ft 7 in (1.7 m)	RS So	South Medford HS	Auckland, New Zealand
F	25	Ta Oramae Solomon	5 ft 11 in (1.8 m)	Jr	Avondale HS; Cochise College	Medford, OR
G	45	Michaela Kay	5 ft 7 in (1.7 m)	Fr	Lewis & Clark HS	Spokane, WA
G	RS	Ashley Bolston (I) (redshirt)	6 ft 2 in (1.88 m)	So	South Medford HS; Washington State	Medford, OR
G	RS	Sidney Rielly (I) (redshirt)	6 ft 0 in (1.83 m)	So	Everett HS; Santa Clara	Everett, WA
F	RS	Courtney West (I) (redshirt)	6 ft 4 in (1.93 m)	So	Port Hacking HS; Southern Oregon	Sydney, Australia

Head coach

- Lynn Kennedy (Northwest University)

Assistant coach(es)

- Alison Hewa (Eastern Washington)
- Chelsey Zimmerman (Southern Oregon)
- Amy Denson (Arizona State)

Legend

- (C) Team captain
- (S) Suspended
- (I) Ineligible
- (W) Walk-on
- Injured
- Current redshirt

Roster
Last update: jULY 17, 2024

== Schedule ==
Date time, TV	Rank^{#}	Opponent^{#}	Result	Record	Site (attendance) city, state
Exhibition
November 9, 2015*; 7:00 p.m.		Oregon Tech	L 69–81		Peter Stott Center (218); Portland, OR
Non-conference regular season
November 13, 2015*; 7:00 p.m.		at Cal State Fullerton	L 69–84	0–1	Titan Gym (199); Fullerton, CA
November 15, 2015*; 2:00 p.m.		at Long Beach State	L 71–89	0–2	Walter Pyramid (552); Long Beach, CA
November 21, 2015*; 2:00 p.m.		Warner Pacific	L 64–76	0–3	Peter Stott Center (214); Portland, OR
November 24, 2015*; 7:00 p.m.		Portland	L 53–69	0–4	Peter Stott Center (225); Portland, OR
November 27, 2015*; 7:00 p.m.		UC Davis	L 70–82	0–5	Peter Stott Center (257); Portland, OR
December 3, 2015*; 5:00 p.m.		at South Dakota State	L 65–74	0–6	Frost Arena (1,509); Brookings, SD
December 5, 2015*; 12:00 p.m.		at South Dakota	L 61–103	0–7	DakotaDome (1,384); Vermillion, SD
December 12, 2015*; 12:00 p.m.		Corban	W 90–76	1–7	Peter Stott Center (281); Portland, OR
December 15, 2015*; 7:00 p.m.		Seattle	L 64–85	1–8	Peter Stott Center (286); Portland, OR
December 17, 2015*; 6:00 p.m.		at Oregon	L 59–122	1–9	Matthew Knight Arena (1,258); Eugene, OR
December 20, 2015*; 7:00 p.m.		Cal State Northridge	W 83–77	2–9	Peter Stott Center (241); Portland, OR
Big Sky regular season
January 2, 2016; 12:00 p.m.		at Sacramento State	L 91–132	2–10 (0–1)	Hornets Nest (391); Sacramento, CA
January 7, 2016; 7:00 p.m.		Montana	L 58–79	2–11 (0–2)	Peter Stott Center (293); Portland, OR
January 9, 2016; 2:00 p.m.		Montana State	L 59–106	2–12 (0–3)	Peter Stott Center (260); Portland, OR
January 14, 2016; 11:00 a.m.		at Weber State	L 73–102	2–13 (0–4)	Dee Events Center; Ogden, UT
January 16, 2016; 1:00 p.m.		at Idaho State	L 70–71	2–14 (0–5)	Reed Gym (941); Pocatello, ID
January 23, 2016; 12:00 p.m.		Sacramento State	L 78–126	2–15 (0–6)	Peter Stott Center (212); Portland, OR
January 28, 2016; 7:00 p.m.		Eastern Washington	W 81–79	3–15 (1–6)	Peter Stott Center (241); Portland, OR
January 30, 2016; 2:00 p.m.		Idaho	L 65–94	3–16 (1–7)	Peter Stott Center (283); Portland, OR
February 4, 2016; 6:00 p.m.		at Montana State	L 64–74	3–17 (1–8)	Worthington Arena (1,221); Bozeman, MT
February 6, 2016; 1:00 p.m.		at Montana	L 57–76	3–18 (1–9)	Dahlberg Arena (2,973); Missoula, MT
February 11, 2016; 12:00 p.m.		Idaho State	L 42–64	3–19 (1–10)	Peter Stott Center (928); Portland, OR
February 13, 2016; 2:00 p.m.		Weber State	L 58–75	3–20 (1–11)	Peter Stott Center (365); Portland, OR
February 18, 2016; 7:00 p.m.		at Idaho	L 63–84	3–21 (1–12)	Cowan Spectrum (678); Moscow, ID
February 20, 2016; 2:00 p.m.		at Eastern Washington	L 57–70	3–22 (1–13)	Reese Court (1,005); Cheney, WA
February 25, 2016; 7:00 p.m.		North Dakota	L 62–75	3–23 (1–14)	Peter Stott Center (268); Portland, OR
February 25, 2016; 2:00 p.m.		Northern Colorado	L 59–70	3–24 (1–15)	Peter Stott Center (186); Portland, OR
March 2, 2016; 6:00 p.m.		at Northern Arizona	W 88–80	4–24 (2–15)	Walkup Skydome (347); Flagstaff, AZ
March 4, 2016; 6:00 p.m.		at Southern Utah	L 64–76	4–25 (2–16)	Centrum Arena (502); Cedar City, UT
Big Sky women's tournament
March 7, 2016; 8:05 p.m.		vs. Weber State; First round	L 68–91	4–26	Reno Events Center (1,274); Reno, NV
*Non-conference game. ^{#}Rankings from AP poll. (#) Tournament seedings in parentheses. All times are in Pacific.

== See also ==
- 2015–16 Portland State Vikings men's basketball team
