= 2015–16 Northern Arizona Lumberjacks women's basketball team =

Intercollegiate basketball season

2015–16 Northern Arizona Lumberjacks women's basketball
- Conference: Big Sky Conference
- Record: 6–24 (2–16 Big Sky)
- Head coach: Sue Darling (4th season)
- Assistant coaches: Robyne Bostick; Karlie Burris; Jamie Rauchwarger
- Home arena: Walkup Skydome; Rolle Activity Center

2015–16 Big Sky women's basketball standings
	Conf.				Overall
Team	W		L	PCT	W		L	PCT
Montana State	14	–	4	.778	21	–	10	.677
Idaho †	13	–	5	.722	24	–	10	.706
Eastern Washington	13	–	5	.722	20	–	12	.625
North Dakota	13	–	5	.722	19	–	14	.576
Montana	12	–	6	.667	20	–	11	.645
Weber State	11	–	7	.611	23	–	12	.657
Sacramento State	10	–	8	.556	14	–	17	.452
Idaho State	8	–	10	.444	18	–	15	.545
Northern Colorado	8	–	10	.444	13	–	16	.448
Northern Arizona	2	–	16	.111	6	–	24	.200
Southern Utah	2	–	16	.111	5	–	25	.167
Portland State	2	–	16	.111	4	–	26	.133
† 2016 Big Sky tournament winner As of March 26, 2016; Rankings from AP poll

The 2015–16 Northern Arizona Lumberjacks women's basketball team represented Northern Arizona University during the 2015–16 NCAA Division I women's basketball season. The Lumberjacks, led by fourth year head coach Sue Darling and played their home games at the Walkup Skydome and the Rolle Activity Center. They were members of the Big Sky Conference. They finished the season 6–24, 2–16 in Big Sky to finish in a 3 way tie for tenth place. They lost in the first round of the Big Sky women's tournament to Montana.

== Roster ==
2015–16 Northern Arizona Lumberjacks women's basketball team
Players
Coaches

Pos.	#	Name	Height	Year	Previous school	Hometown
G	1	Rene Coggins	5 ft 8 in (1.73 m)	Jr	Mountain View	Mesa, AZ
G	3	Monique Mulder	5 ft 3 in (1.6 m)	Sr	Deer Valley; New Mexico JC	Antioch, CA
G	4	Brittani Lusain	5 ft 8 in (1.73 m)	Jr	Mater Dei Catholic	San Diego, CA
G	10	Passionate Amukamara	5 ft 7 in (1.7 m)	Fr	Millennium	Glendale, AZ
G	11	Olivia Lucero (I) (redshirt)	5 ft 8 in (1.73 m)	So	Highland; Loyola Marymount	Gilbert, AZ
F	12	Kenna McDavis (I) (redshirt)	6 ft 1 in (1.85 m)	Jr	Pinnacle HS; Boise State	Phoenix, AZ
G	21	Mariah Willadsen	5 ft 8 in (1.73 m)	Sr	Red Mountain; Mesa CC	Mesa, AZ
F	22	Catelyn Preston	5 ft 10 in (1.78 m)	Jr	Oregon City	Oregon City, OR
F	23	Kaleigh Paplow	5 ft 8 in (1.73 m)	Fr	Lutheran	Parker, CO
F	24	Shay Young	5 ft 11 in (1.8 m)	RS Jr	Mount Miguel; New Mexico State	San Diego, CA
G	34	Taylor Leyva	5 ft 11 in (1.8 m)	Jr	Pueblo West	Pueblo West, CO
G	50	Bradlee Cotton	6 ft 0 in (1.83 m)	Jr	Denver School S&T	Denver, CO
C	54	Alyssa Rader	6 ft 2 in (1.88 m)	Fr	Horizon	Thornton, CO

Head coach

- Sue Darling (Arizona)

Assistant coach(es)

- Robyne Bostick (Saint Joseph's)
- Karlie Burris (Portland)
- Jamie Rauchwarger (Cal State Northridge)

Legend

- (C) Team captain
- (S) Suspended
- (I) Ineligible
- (W) Walk-on
- Injured
- Current redshirt

Roster

== Schedule ==
Date time, TV	Rank^{#}	Opponent^{#}	Result	Record	Site (attendance) city, state
Non-conference regular season
11/15/2015*; 2:00 pm		Hawaiʻi	L 52–61	0–1	Rolle Activity Center (378); Flagstaff, AZ
11/17/2015*; 7:05 pm		at UTEP	L 66–77	0–2	Don Haskins Center (711); El Paso, TX
11/22/2015*; 2:00 pm, FSAZ/FCSP		Lamar	W 75–63	1–2	Rolle Activity Center (306); Flagstaff, AZ
11/27/2015*; 3:00 pm		vs. Long Beach State; Hotel Encanto Thanksgiving Classic	L 48–69	1–3	Pan American Center (123); Las Cruces, NM
11/28/2015*; 7:00 pm		at New Mexico State; Hotel Encanto Thanksgiving Classic	L 53–87	1–4	Pan American Center (946); Las Cruces, NM
12/01/2015*; 11:00 am, FSAZ/FCSP		New Mexico Highlands	W 91–43	2–4	Rolle Activity Center (1,104); Flagstaff, AZ
12/04/2015*; 8:00 pm		at UC Irvine	W 71–55	3–4	Bren Events Center (213); Irvine, CA
12/09/2015*; 7:00 pm		at Colorado	L 66–90	3–5	Coors Events Center (1,532); Boulder, CO
12/12/2015*; 2:00 pm, FSAZ/FCSP		Dixie State	W 68–66	4–5	Walkup Skydome (482); Flagstaff, AZ
12/19/2015*; 3:00 pm		at Nebraska	L 67–90	4–6	Pinnacle Bank Arena (4,775); Lincoln, NE
12/22/2015*; 1:00 pm, Cyclones.tv		at Iowa State	L 63–79	4–7	Hilton Coliseum (7,606); Ames, IA
Big Sky regular season
12/31/2015; 4:00 pm		at Montana	L 58–81	4–8 (0–1)	Dahlberg Arena (2,787); Missoula, MT
01/02/2016; 2:00 pm		at Montana State	L 77–86 ^{OT}	4–9 (0–2)	Worthington Arena (1,238); Bozeman, MT
01/09/2016; 2:00 pm		Southern Utah	W 57–48	5–9 (1–2)	Walkup Skydome (227); Flagstaff, AZ
01/14/2016; 6:30 pm, FSAZ+/FCSP		Idaho	L 51–72	5–10 (1–3)	Walkup Skydome (309); Flagstaff, AZ
01/16/2016; 6:30 pm, FSAZ/FCSP		Eastern Washington	L 71–81	5–11 (1–4)	Walkup Skydome (346); Flagstaff, AZ
01/21/2016; 6:00 pm, FCSC		at North Dakota	L 58–63	5–12 (1–5)	Betty Engelstad Sioux Center (1,418); Grand Forks, ND
01/23/2016; 2:00 pm		at Northern Colorado	L 55–79	5–13 (1–6)	Bank of Colorado Arena (858); Greeley, CO
01/28/2016; 6:30 pm, FSAZ/FCSP		Weber State	L 56–76	5–14 (1–7)	Walkup Skydome (352); Flagstaff, AZ
01/30/2016; 6:30 pm, FSAZ/FCSP		Idaho State	W 63–62	6–14 (2–7)	Walkup Skydome (421); Flagstaff, AZ
02/04/2016; 7:00 pm		at Eastern Washington	L 65–72	6–15 (2–8)	Reese Court (581); Cheney, WA
02/06/2016; 3:00 pm		at Idaho	L 59–76	6–16 (2–9)	Cowan Spectrum (622); Moscow, ID
02/11/2016; 6:30 pm, FSAZ/FCSP		Montana State	L 72–83	6–17 (2–10)	Walkup Skydome (503); Flagstaff, AZ
02/13/2016; 5:00 pm, FSAZ		Montana	L 57–61	6–18 (2–11)	Walkup Skydome (482); Flagstaff, AZ
02/18/2016; 7:00 pm		at Idaho State	L 61–71	6–19 (2–12)	Reed Gym (826); Pocatello, ID
02/20/2016; 2:00 pm		at Weber State	L 88–95 ^{OT}	6–20 (2–13)	Dee Events Center (591); Ogden, UT
02/27/2016; 7:00 pm		at Southern Utah	L 68–73	6–21 (2–14)	Centrum Arena (473); Cedar City, UT
03/02/2016; 7:00 pm, FSAZ/FCSP		Portland State	L 80–88	6–22 (2–15)	Walkup Skydome (347); Flagstaff, AZ
03/04/2016; 6:30 pm, FSAZ+		Sacramento State	L 79–111	6–23 (2–16)	Walkup Skydome (487); Flagstaff, AZ
Big Sky Women's Tournament
03/07/2016; 3:35 pm		vs. Montana; First Round	L 63–78	6–24	Reno Events Center (277); Reno, NV
*Non-conference game. ^{#}Rankings from AP Poll. (#) Tournament seedings in parentheses. All times are in Mountain Time.

== See also ==
- 2015–16 Northern Arizona Lumberjacks men's basketball team
