= 2015–16 Sacramento State Hornets women's basketball team =

Intercollegiate basketball season

2015–16 Sacramento State Hornets women's basketball
- Conference: Big Sky Conference
- Record: 14–17 (10–8 Big Sky)
- Head coach: Bunky Harkleroad (3rd season)
- Assistant coaches: Kim Stephens; Bill Baxter; Derrick Florence
- Home arena: Hornets Nest

2015–16 Big Sky women's basketball standings
| | Conf. | | | | Overall |
| Team | W | | L | PCT | W | | L | PCT |
|---|---|---|---|---|---|---|---|---|
| Montana State | 14 | – | 4 | .778 | 21 | – | 10 | .677 |
| Idaho † | 13 | – | 5 | .722 | 24 | – | 10 | .706 |
| Eastern Washington | 13 | – | 5 | .722 | 20 | – | 12 | .625 |
| North Dakota | 13 | – | 5 | .722 | 19 | – | 14 | .576 |
| Montana | 12 | – | 6 | .667 | 20 | – | 11 | .645 |
| Weber State | 11 | – | 7 | .611 | 23 | – | 12 | .657 |
| Sacramento State | 10 | – | 8 | .556 | 14 | – | 17 | .452 |
| Idaho State | 8 | – | 10 | .444 | 18 | – | 15 | .545 |
| Northern Colorado | 8 | – | 10 | .444 | 13 | – | 16 | .448 |
| Northern Arizona | 2 | – | 16 | .111 | 6 | – | 24 | .200 |
| Southern Utah | 2 | – | 16 | .111 | 5 | – | 25 | .167 |
| Portland State | 2 | – | 16 | .111 | 4 | – | 26 | .133 |
† 2016 Big Sky tournament winner As of March 26, 2016; Rankings from AP poll

The 2015–16 Sacramento State Hornets women's basketball team represented California State University, Sacramento during the 2015–16 NCAA Division I women's basketball season. The Hornets, led by third-year head coach Bunky Harkleroad, played their home games at Hornets Nest. They were members of the Big Sky Conference. They finished the season 14–17, 10–8 in Big Sky play, to finish in seventh place. They advanced to the quarterfinals to the Big Sky women's tournament where they lost to Eastern Washington.

== Roster ==
2015–16 Sacramento State Hornets women's basketball team
Players
Coaches

| Pos. | # | Name | Height | Year | Previous school | Hometown |
|---|---|---|---|---|---|---|
| G | 1 | Raegen Rohn | 5 ft 6 in (1.68 m) | Fr | Monarch HS | Erie, CO |
| G | 2 | Taylor Brown | 5 ft 7 in (1.7 m) | So | Chino HS | Chino, CA |
| G | 3 | Brianna Burgos | 5 ft 6 in (1.68 m) | RS Jr | Sheldon HS; Sonoma State | Sacramento, CA |
| G | 4 | Ericka Magaña | 5 ft 7 in (1.7 m) | Sr | Inderkum HS; Sierra College | Sacramento, CA |
| G | 5 | Kelli Robinson | 5 ft 6 in (1.68 m) | RS Fr | Woodbridge HS | Irvine, CA |
| F | 10 | Margaret Huntington | 6 ft 0 in (1.83 m) | So | Bishop O'Dowd HS | Oakland, CA |
| G | 11 | Takara Burse | 5 ft 8 in (1.73 m) | Sr | Eastside Prep HS | East Palo Alto, CA |
| G | 12 | Ashlyn Crenshaw | 5 ft 8 in (1.73 m) | Jr | Lincoln HS | Stockton, CA |
| G | 14 | Justyce Dawson | 5 ft 4 in (1.63 m) | So | Long Beach Poly HS | Carson, CA |
| F | 15 | Sydonia Daniels | 6 ft 1 in (1.85 m) | Sr | Arts HS; State Fair CC | Irvington, NJ |
| G | 20 | Adella Randle-El | 5 ft 8 in (1.73 m) | Sr | J. I. Case HS; State Fair CC | Racine, WI |
| G | 22 | Maranne Johnson | 5 ft 7 in (1.7 m) | So | Deer Valley HS | Antioch, CA |
| G | 23 | Madeline Dopplick | 5 ft 7 in (1.7 m) | Fr | Millikan HS | Long Beach, CA |
| F | 24 | Gretchen Harringan | 5 ft 8 in (1.73 m) | Jr | Casa Grande HS; Santa Rosa JC | Petaluma, CA |
| F | 30 | Kyhonta Doughty | 6 ft 1 in (1.85 m) | Jr | Warren Easton HS; Trinity Valley CC | New Orleans, LA |
| G | 33 | Abby Goodsell | 5 ft 7 in (1.7 m) | So | Orange Lutheran HS; Long Beach CC | Yorba Linda, CA |

Head coach

- Bunky Harkleroad (Berea)

Assistant coach(es)

- Kim Stephens (Glenville State)
- Bill Baxter (UC Davis)
- Derrick Florence (Morehouse)

Legend

- (C) Team captain
- (S) Suspended
- (I) Ineligible
- (W) Walk-on
- Injured
- Current redshirt

Roster
Last update: August 7, 2024

== Schedule ==
| Date time, TV | Rank^{#} | Opponent^{#} | Result | Record | Site (attendance) city, state |
Non-conference regular season
| November 14, 2015*; 1:00 p.m. | | at Utah State | W 95–86 | 1–0 | Smith Spectrum (320); Logan, UT |
| November 19, 2015*; 6:00 p.m. | | at New Mexico State | L 77–80 | 1–1 | Pan American Center (1,265); Las Cruces, NM |
| November 21, 2015*; 12:00 p.m. | | at New Mexico | L 71–84 | 1–2 | The Pit (5,178); Albuquerque, NM |
| November 28, 2015*; 12:05 p.m. | | San Francisco | L 94–95 | 1–3 | Hornets Nest (387); Sacramento, CA |
| December 5, 2015*; 4:00 p.m. | | vs. Villanova; Cal Classic semifinals | L 54–78 | 1–4 | Haas Pavilion; Berkeley, CA |
| December 6, 2015*; 1:00 p.m. | | at California; Cal Classic 3rd-place game | L 99–117 | 1–5 | Haas Pavilion (612); Berkeley, CA |
| December 13, 2015*; 2:00 p.m. | | at UC Davis | W 92–77 | 2–5 | The Pavilion (503); Davis, CA |
| December 18, 2015*; 7:05 p.m. | | No. 19 UCLA | L 76–109 | 2–6 | Hornets Nest (688); Sacramento, CA |
| December 20, 2015*; 5:05 p.m. | | Hawaiʻi | L 72–74 | 2–7 | Hornets Nest (435); Sacramento, CA |
| December 22, 2015*; 2:05 p.m. | | UC Irvine | W 126–78 | 3–7 | Hornets Nest (349); Sacramento, CA |
| December 29, 2015*; 7:00 p.m. | | at Cal Poly | L 72–97 | 3–8 | Mott Athletic Center (619); San Luis Obispo, CA |
Big Sky regular season
| January 2, 2016; 12:05 p.m. | | Portland State | W 132–91 | 4–8 (1–0) | Hornets Nest (391); Sacramento, CA |
| January 7, 2016; 7:05 p.m. | | Montana State | L 79–80 | 4–9 (1–1) | Hornets Nest (315); Sacramento, CA |
| January 7, 2016; 2:05 p.m. | | Montana | W 83–75 ^{OT} | 5–9 (2–1) | Hornets Nest (389); Sacramento, CA |
| January 14, 2016; 6:00 p.m. | | Idaho State | W 68–59 | 6–9 (3–1) | Reed Gym (926); Pocatello, ID |
| January 16, 2016; 1:00 p.m. | | at Weber State | L 66–77 | 6–10 (3–2) | Dee Events Center (527); Ogden, UT |
| January 23, 2016; 12:00 p.m. | | at Portland State | W 126–78 | 7–10 (4–2) | Peter Stott Center (212); Portland, OR |
| January 28, 2016; 7:05 p.m. | | Idaho | L 88–98 | 7–11 (4–3) | Hornets Nest (427); Sacramento, CA |
| January 30, 2016; 2:05 p.m. | | Eastern Washington | L 83–100 | 7–12 (4–4) | Hornets Nest (524); Sacramento, CA |
| February 4, 2016; 6:00 p.m. | | at Montana | L 83–90 | 7–13 (4–5) | Dahlberg Arena (2,919); Missoula, MT |
| February 6, 2016; 1:00 p.m. | | at Montana State | L 99–116 | 7–14 (4–6) | Worthington Arena (1,678); Bozeman, MT |
| February 11, 2016; 7:05 p.m. | | Weber State | W 87–64 | 8–14 (5–6) | Hornets Nest (443); Sacramento, CA |
| February 13, 2016; 2:05 p.m. | | Idaho State | W 83–62 | 9–14 (6–6) | Hornets Nest (284); Sacramento, CA |
| February 18, 2016; 6:00 p.m. | | at Eastern Washington | W 94–91 | 10–14 (7–6) | Reese Court (689); Cheney, WA |
| February 20, 2016; 2:00 p.m. | | at Idaho | L 60–107 | 10–15 (7–7) | Cowan Spectrum (906); Moscow, ID |
| February 25, 2016; 7:05 p.m. | | Northern Colorado | W 83–72 | 11–15 (8–7) | Hornets Nest (489); Sacramento, CA |
| February 27, 2016; 2:05 p.m. | | North Dakota | L 79–86 | 11–16 (8–8) | Hornets Nest (429); Sacramento, CA |
| March 2, 2016; 6:00 p.m. | | at Southern Utah | W 82–72 | 12–16 (9–8) | Centrum Arena (487); Cedar City, UT |
| March 4, 2016; 5:30 p.m., FSAZ+ | | at Northern Arizona | W 111–79 | 13–16 (10–8) | Walkup Skydome (487); Flagstaff, AZ |
Big Sky women's tournament
| March 7, 2016; 5:35 p.m. | | vs. Southern Utah; First Round | W 102–89 | 14–16 | Reno Events Center (1,274); Reno, NV |
| March 9, 2016; 5:35 p.m. | | vs. Eastern Washington; Quarterfinals | L 97–100 | 14–17 | Reno Events Center (1,320); Reno, NV |
*Non-conference game. ^{#}Rankings from AP poll. (#) Tournament seedings in parentheses. All times are in Pacific.

== See also ==
- 2015–16 Sacramento State Hornets men's basketball team
