= 2015–16 Eastern Washington Eagles women's basketball team =

Intercollegiate basketball season

2015–16 Eastern Washington Eagles women's basketball
- Conference: Big Sky Conference
- Record: 20–12 (13–5 Big Sky)
- Head coach: Wendy Schuller (15th season)
- Assistant coaches: Jerise Freeman; Bryce Currie; Jodi Page
- Home arena: Reese Court

2015–16 Big Sky women's basketball standings
	Conf.				Overall
Team	W		L	PCT	W		L	PCT
Montana State	14	–	4	.778	21	–	10	.677
Idaho †	13	–	5	.722	24	–	10	.706
Eastern Washington	13	–	5	.722	20	–	12	.625
North Dakota	13	–	5	.722	19	–	14	.576
Montana	12	–	6	.667	20	–	11	.645
Weber State	11	–	7	.611	23	–	12	.657
Sacramento State	10	–	8	.556	14	–	17	.452
Idaho State	8	–	10	.444	18	–	15	.545
Northern Colorado	8	–	10	.444	13	–	16	.448
Northern Arizona	2	–	16	.111	6	–	24	.200
Southern Utah	2	–	16	.111	5	–	25	.167
Portland State	2	–	16	.111	4	–	26	.133
† 2016 Big Sky tournament winner As of March 26, 2016; Rankings from AP poll

The 2015–16 Eastern Washington Eagles Women's basketball team represented Eastern Washington University during the 2015–16 NCAA Division I women's basketball season. The Eagles, led by fifteenth-year head coach Wendy Schuller, played their home games at Reese Court. They were members of the Big Sky Conference. They finished the season 20–12, 13–5 in Big Sky play, to finish in a three-way tie for second place. They advanced to the semifinals of the Big Sky women's tournament where they lost to Idaho State. Despite having 20 wins, they were not invited to a postseason tournament.

== Roster ==
2015–16 Eastern Washington Eagles women's basketball team
Players
Coaches

Pos.	#	Name	Height	Year	Previous school	Hometown
G	00	Ashli Payne	6 ft 0 in (1.83 m)	Jr	Olympic HS; Umpqua CC	Bremerton, WA
G	1	Aqeelah Williams	5 ft 8 in (1.73 m)	Fr	Cleveland HS	Seattle, WA
G	4	Delaney Hodgins	6 ft 0 in (1.83 m)	So	Chiawana HS	Pasco, WA
G	5	Baylee Rexing	5 ft 3 in (1.6 m)	Fr	North Gwinnett HS	Suwanee, GA
G	12	Violet Kapri Morrow	5 ft 8 in (1.73 m)	Fr	Wilson HS	Tacoma, WA
G	13	Desiree Harding	5 ft 7 in (1.7 m)	Fr	Fresno HS	Fresno, CA
G	20	Tisha Phillips	5 ft 9 in (1.75 m)	RS Jr	Lewiston HS	Lapwai, ID
F	23	Mariah Cunningham	6 ft 0 in (1.83 m)	So	Central Valley HS	Spokane, WA
G	24	Amira Chandler	6 ft 2 in (1.88 m)	Fr	Wenatchee HS	Wenatchee, WA
G	25	Hayley Hodgins	5 ft 10 in (1.78 m)	RS Sr	Chiawana HS	Pasco, WA
F	30	Alissa Sealby	6 ft 0 in (1.83 m)	Fr	Wenatchee HS	Wenatchee, WA
G	55	Beathany Montgomery	5 ft 9 in (1.75 m)	RS So	Wilson HS	Tacoma, WA

Head coach

- Wendy Schuller (Fresno Pacific)

Assistant coach(es)

- Jerise Freeman (Pacific)
- Bryce Currie (Washington)
- Jodi Page (San José State)

Legend

- (C) Team captain
- (S) Suspended
- (I) Ineligible
- (W) Walk-on
- Injured
- Current redshirt

Roster
Last update: July 17, 2024

== Schedule ==
Date time, TV	Rank^{#}	Opponent^{#}	Result	Record	Site (attendance) city, state
Exhibition
November 6, 2015*; 6:00 p.m.		Saint Martin's	W 77–52		Reese Court (465); Cheney, WA
Non-conference regular season
November 13, 2015*; 11:00 a.m.		Eastern Oregon	W 64–40	1–0	Reese Court (645); Cheney, WA
November 15, 2015*; 1:00 p.m.		Air Force	W 65–44	2–0	Reese Court (362); Cheney, WA
November 19, 2015*; 6:00 p.m.		at Gonzaga	L 56–78	2–1	McCarthey Athletic Center (5,439); Spokane, WA
November 22, 2015*; 1:00 p.m.		Cal State Northridge	W 70–59	3–1	Reese Court (100); Cheney, WA
November 26, 2015*; 3:00 p.m.		vs. No. 19 Northwestern; Lone Star Showcase	L 70–74	3–2	Cedar Park Center; Cedar Park, TX
November 27, 2015*; 3:00 p.m.		vs. East Carolina; Lone Star Showcase	L 62–80	3–3	Cedar Park Center; Cedar Park, TX
November 28, 2015*; 3:00 p.m.		vs. Creighton; Lone Star Showcase	L 60–66 ^{OT}	3–4	Cedar Park Center; Cedar Park, TX
December 3, 2015*; 6:00 p.m.		Utah Valley	W 68–64	4–4	Reese Court (154); Cheney, WA
December 13, 2015*; 1:00 p.m.		at Cal State Fullerton	W 68–57	5–4	Titan Gym (119); Fullerton, CA
December 15, 2015*; 5:05 p.m., ESPN3		at Wichita State	W 67–62	6–4	Charles Koch Arena (1,337); Wichita, KS
December 18, 2015*; 6:00 p.m.		Abilene Christian	L 60–72	6–5	Reese Court (153); Cheney, WA
December 21, 2015*; 6:00 p.m.		Boise State	L 79–84	6–6	Reese Court (165); Cheney, WA
Big Sky regular season
December 31, 2015; 3:00 p.m.		Northern Colorado	W 59–55	7–6 (1–0)	Reese Court (119); Cheney, WA
January 2, 2016; 2:00 p.m.		North Dakota	W 60–57	8–6 (2–0)	Reese Court (186); Cheney, WA
January 9, 2016; 2:00 p.m.		at Idaho	W 74–66	9–6 (3–0)	Cowan Spectrum (378); Moscow, ID
January 14, 2016; 6:00 p.m.		at Southern Utah	W 85–82	10–6 (4–0)	Centrum Arena (637); Cedar City, UT
January 14, 2016; 5:30 p.m.		at Northern Arizona	W 81–71	11–6 (5–0)	Walkup Skydome (346); Flagstaff, AZ
January 21, 2016; 6:00 p.m.		Montana State	W 81–69	12–6 (6–0)	Reese Court (885); Cheney, WA
January 23, 2016; 2:00 p.m.		Montana	W 67–65	13–6 (7–0)	Reese Court (1,055); Cheney, WA
January 28, 2016; 7:00 p.m.		at Portland State	L 79–81	13–7 (7–1)	Peter Stott Center (241); Portland, OR
January 30, 2016; 2:05 p.m.		at Sacramento State	W 100–83	14–7 (8–1)	Hornets Nest (524); Sacramento, CA
February 4, 2016; 6:00 p.m.		Northern Arizona	W 72–65	15–7 (9–1)	Reese Court (581); Cheney, WA
February 6, 2016; 2:00 p.m.		Southern Utah	W 64–53	16–7 (10–1)	Reese Court (789); Cheney, WA
February 11, 2016; 5:00 p.m.		at North Dakota	L 69–72	16–8 (10–2)	Betty Engelstad Sioux Center (1,451); Grand Forks, ND
February 13, 2016; 12:00 p.m.		at Northern Colorado	W 66–57	17–8 (11–2)	Bank of Colorado Arena (904); Greeley, CO
February 18, 2016; 6:00 p.m.		Sacramento State	L 91–94	17–9 (11–3)	Reese Court (689); Cheney, WA
February 20, 2016; 2:00 p.m.		Portland State	W 70–57	18–9 (12–3)	Reese Court (1,005); Cheney, WA
February 27, 2016; 2:00 p.m.		Idaho	W 84–70	19–9 (13–3)	Reese Court (890); Cheney, WA
March 2, 2016; 6:00 p.m.		at Idaho State	L 62–71	19–10 (13–4)	Reed Gym (998); Pocatello, ID
March 4, 2016; 6:00 p.m.		at Weber State	L 74–80	19–11 (13–5)	Dee Events Center (786); Logan, UT
Big Sky women's tournament
March 9, 2016; 5:35 p.m.		vs. Sacramento State; Quarterfinals	W 100–97	20–11	Reno Events Center (1,311); Reno, NV
March 11, 2016; 2:05 p.m.		vs. Idaho; Semifinals	L 71–86	20–12	Reno Events Center (827); Reno, NV
*Non-conference game. ^{#}Rankings from AP poll. (#) Tournament seedings in parentheses. All times are in Pacific.

== See also ==
2015–16 Eastern Washington Eagles men's basketball team
