= 2015–16 North Dakota Fighting Hawks women's basketball team =

Intercollegiate basketball season

2015–16 North Dakota Fighting Hawks women's basketball

WBI, Quarterfinals
- Conference: Big Sky Conference
- Record: 19–14 (13–5 Big Sky)
- Head coach: Travis Brewster (4th season)
- Assistant coaches: Adam Jacobson; Mallory Youngblut; Jackie Voigt
- Home arena: Betty Engelstad Sioux Center

2015–16 Big Sky women's basketball standings
	Conf.				Overall
Team	W		L	PCT	W		L	PCT
Montana State	14	–	4	.778	21	–	10	.677
Idaho †	13	–	5	.722	24	–	10	.706
Eastern Washington	13	–	5	.722	20	–	12	.625
North Dakota	13	–	5	.722	19	–	14	.576
Montana	12	–	6	.667	20	–	11	.645
Weber State	11	–	7	.611	23	–	12	.657
Sacramento State	10	–	8	.556	14	–	17	.452
Idaho State	8	–	10	.444	18	–	15	.545
Northern Colorado	8	–	10	.444	13	–	16	.448
Northern Arizona	2	–	16	.111	6	–	24	.200
Southern Utah	2	–	16	.111	5	–	25	.167
Portland State	2	–	16	.111	4	–	26	.133
† 2016 Big Sky tournament winner As of March 26, 2016; Rankings from AP poll

The 2015–16 North Dakota Fighting Hawks women's basketball team represented the University of North Dakota during the 2015–16 NCAA Division I women's basketball season. The Fighting Hawks were led by fourth-year head coach Travis Brewster and played their home games at the Betty Engelstad Sioux Center. They were members of the Big Sky Conference. They finished the season 19–14, 13–5 in Big Sky play to finish in a three-way tie for second place. They advanced to the semifinals of the Big Sky women's tournament, where they lost to Idaho State. They were invited to the Women's Basketball Invitational, where they defeated New Mexico in the first round before losing in the quarterfinals to Big Sky member Weber State.

== Roster ==
2015–16 North Dakota Fighting Hawks women's basketball team
Players
Coaches

Pos.	#	Name	Height	Year	Previous school	Hometown
G	1	Leah Szabla	5 ft 9 in (1.75 m)	Jr	Providence Academy	Brooklyn Park, MN
F	2	Mia Loyd	5 ft 11 in (1.8 m)	Sr	DeLaSalle HS	Minneapolis, MN
G	3	Katie Klapprodt	5 ft 3 in (1.6 m)	RS Jr	Stevens HS	Rapid City, SD
G	4	Jill Morton	5 ft 9 in (1.75 m)	Fr	Edina HS	Edina, MN
F	5	Samantha Roscoe	6 ft 3 in (1.91 m)	Jr	Newman College	Perth, Western Australia
G	10	Makailah Dyer	5 ft 9 in (1.75 m)	RS Jr	East HS; Wisconsin	Madison, WI
G	11	Grace Sawatzke	5 ft 9 in (1.75 m)	So	Monticello HS	Monticello, MN
G	12	Kanani Asuncion	5 ft 11 in (1.8 m)	Fr	Century HS	Rochester, MN
G	15	Kelsey Knox	5 ft 7 in (1.7 m)	Sr	Platte City HS; Johnson County CC	Platte City, MO
G	21	Ellie Ripplinger	5 ft 5 in (1.65 m)	RS So	Red River HS	Grand Forks, ND
G	22	Sydney Boike	5 ft 10 in (1.78 m)	Fr	Crookston HS	Crookston, MN
C	23	Emily Evers	6 ft 5 in (1.96 m)	RS Sr	Red River HS	Grand Forks, ND
G	24	Bailey Strand	5 ft 10 in (1.78 m)	So	Kennedy Secondary	Fergus Falls, MN
C	30	Stephanie Smith	6 ft 6 in (1.98 m)	Jr	Mountain View HS; Central Wyoming College	Mountain View, WY
G	32	Kaila Burroughs (I) (redshirt)	6 ft 1 in (1.85 m)	So	St. Cloud Tech; Denver	St. Cloud, MN
F	34	Lexi Klabo	6 ft 2 in (1.88 m)	Fr	Davies HS	Fargo, ND
F	35	Fallyn Freije	6 ft 0 in (1.83 m)	Fr	Lakota-Edmore HS	Edmore, ND
F	45	Jordan Meyer	6 ft 2 in (1.88 m)	RS Fr	Anoka HS	Anoka, MN

Head coach

- Travis Brewster (Charleston Southern)

Assistant coach(es)

- Adam Jacobson (North Dakota)
- Mallory Youngblut (North Dakota)
- Jackie Voigt (Minnesota)

Legend

- (C) Team captain
- (S) Suspended
- (I) Ineligible
- (W) Walk-on
- Injured
- Current redshirt

Roster

== Schedule ==
Date time, TV	Rank^{#}	Opponent^{#}	Result	Record	Site (attendance) city, state
Exhibition
11/01/2015*; 2:00 pm		Mayville State	W 80–69		Betty Engelstad Sioux Center (1,519); Grand Forks, ND
11/08/2015*; 2:00 pm		Minnesota–Crookston	W 72–47		Betty Engelstad Sioux Center (1,493); Grand Forks, ND
Non-conference regular season
11/13/2015*; 6:00 pm		at Iowa; Hawkeye Challenge	L 61–83	0–1	Carver–Hawkeye Arena (4,358); Iowa City, IA
11/14/2015*; 3:30 pm		vs. Tennessee–Martin; Hawkeye Challenge	L 58–84	0–2	Carver–Hawkeye Arena (125); Iowa City, IA
11/17/2015*; 7:00 pm, FSNOR+/FCSC		Nebraska–Omaha	W 67–52	1–2	Betty Engelstad Sioux Center (1,456); Grand Forks, ND
11/22/2015*; 2:00 pm, ESPN3		at Drake	L 63–73	1–3	Knapp Center (2,064); Des Moines, IA
11/25/2015*; 7:30 pm		at San Francisco	L 57–74	1–4	War Memorial Gymnasium (301); San Francisco, CA
11/28/2015*; 4:00 pm		at Oregon	L 51–77	1–5	Matthew Knight Arena (1,141); Eugene, OR
12/05/2015*; 2:00 pm, FSNOR/FCSC		Northern Iowa	W 64–59	2–5	Betty Engelstad Sioux Center (2,012); Grand Forks, ND
12/08/2015*; 7:00 pm, FSNOR/FCSC		Western Illinois	W 78–67	3–5	Betty Engelstad Sioux Center (1,385); Grand Forks, ND
12/12/2015*; 2:00 pm, MidcoSN/FCSC		North Dakota State	W 71–54	4–5	Betty Engelstad Sioux Center (2,564); Grand Forks, ND
12/19/2015*; 2:00 pm, FSNOR/FCSC		South Dakota	L 70–73	4–6	Betty Engelstad Sioux Center (1,532); Grand Forks, ND
12/23/2015*; 3:00 pm		at Minnesota	L 47–57	4–7	Williams Arena (2,800); Minneapolis, MN
Big Sky regular season
12/31/2015; 4:00 pm		at Idaho	L 65–92	4–8 (0–1)	Cowan Spectrum (346); Moscow, ID
01/02/2016; 4:00 pm		at Eastern Washington	L 57–60	4–9 (0–2)	Reese Court (186); Cheney, WA
01/07/2016; 7:00 pm, MidcoSN/FCSC		Weber State	L 56–62	4–10 (0–3)	Betty Engelstad Sioux Center (1,304); Grand Forks, ND
01/09/2016; 2:00 pm, FSNOR/FCSC		Idaho State	W 45–42	5–10 (1–3)	Betty Engelstad Sioux Center (1,389); Grand Forks, ND
01/14/2016; 8:00 pm		at Montana State	L 61–69	5–11 (1–4)	Worthington Arena (1,284); Bozeman, MT
01/16/2016; 3:00 pm		at Montana	W 61–59	6–11 (2–4)	Dahlberg Arena (2,985); Missoula, MT
01/21/2016; 7:00 pm, MidcoSN/FCSC		Northern Arizona	W 63–58	7–11 (3–4)	Betty Engelstad Sioux Center (1,418); Grand Forks, ND
01/23/2016; 2:00 pm, FSNOR/FCSC		Southern Utah	W 68–56	8–11 (4–4)	Betty Engelstad Sioux Center (2,077); Grand Forks, ND
01/30/2016; 7:00 pm, MidcoSN/FCSC		Northern Colorado	W 54–51	9–11 (5–4)	Betty Engelstad Sioux Center (1,806); Grand Forks, ND
02/04/2016; 8:00 pm		at Idaho State	W 60–57	10–11 (6–4)	Reed Gym (800); Pocatello, ID
02/06/2016; 3:00 pm		at Weber State	W 85–78 ^{OT}	11–11 (7–4)	Dee Events Center (527); Ogden, UT
02/11/2016; 7:00 pm, MidcoSN/FCSC		Eastern Washington	W 72–69	12–11 (8–4)	Betty Engelstad Sioux Center (1,451); Grand Forks, ND
02/13/2016; 2:00 pm, FSNOR/FCSC		Idaho	L 59–65	12–12 (8–5)	Betty Engelstad Sioux Center (1,526); Grand Forks, ND
02/20/2016; 3:00 pm		at Northern Colorado	W 59–58	13–12 (9–5)	Bank of Colorado Arena (740); Greeley, CO
02/25/2016; 9:00 pm		at Portland State	W 75–62	14–12 (10–5)	Peter Stott Center (268); Portland, OR
02/27/2016; 4:00 pm		at Sacramento State	W 86–79	15–12 (11–5)	Hornets Nest (429); Sacramento, CA
03/02/2016; 7:00 pm, FSNOR/FCSC		Montana	W 73–61	16–12 (12–5)	Betty Engelstad Sioux Center (1,677); Grand Forks, ND
03/04/2016; 2:00 pm		Montana State	W 77–76	17–12 (13–5)	Betty Engelstad Sioux Center (1,671); Grand Forks, ND
Big Sky tournament
03/09/2016; 4:35 pm		vs. Montana; Quarterfinals	W 65–62	18–12	Reno Events Center (1,263); Reno, NV
03/11/2016; 2:05 pm		vs. Idaho State; Semifinals	L 54–69	18–13	Reno Events Center (1,080); Reno, NV
WBI
03/17/2016*; 7:00 pm		Grand Canyon; First Round	W 57–51	19–13	Betty Engelstad Sioux Center (645); Grand Forks, ND
03/20/2016*; 7:00 pm		Weber State; Quarterfinals	L 74–76	19–14	Betty Engelstad Sioux Center (862); Grand Forks, ND
*Non-conference game. ^{#}Rankings from AP Poll. (#) Tournament seedings in parentheses. All times are in Central Time.

== See also ==
- 2015–16 North Dakota Fighting Hawks men's basketball team
