= 2015–16 Idaho Vandals women's basketball team =

Intercollegiate basketball season

2015–16 Idaho Vandals women's basketball

Big Sky tournament Champions

NCAA Women's Tournament, first round
- Conference: Big Sky Conference
- Record: 24–10 (13–5 Big Sky)
- Head coach: Jon Newlee (8th season)
- Assistant coaches: Christa Stanford; Jeri Jacobson; Kristi Zeller
- Home arena: Cowan Spectrum; Memorial Gym

2015–16 Big Sky women's basketball standings
	Conf.				Overall
Team	W		L	PCT	W		L	PCT
Montana State	14	–	4	.778	21	–	10	.677
Idaho †	13	–	5	.722	24	–	10	.706
Eastern Washington	13	–	5	.722	20	–	12	.625
North Dakota	13	–	5	.722	19	–	14	.576
Montana	12	–	6	.667	20	–	11	.645
Weber State	11	–	7	.611	23	–	12	.657
Sacramento State	10	–	8	.556	14	–	17	.452
Idaho State	8	–	10	.444	18	–	15	.545
Northern Colorado	8	–	10	.444	13	–	16	.448
Northern Arizona	2	–	16	.111	6	–	24	.200
Southern Utah	2	–	16	.111	5	–	25	.167
Portland State	2	–	16	.111	4	–	26	.133
† 2016 Big Sky tournament winner As of March 26, 2016; Rankings from AP poll

The 2015–16 Idaho Vandals women's basketball team represented the University of Idaho during the 2015–16 NCAA Division I women's basketball season. The Vandals, led by eighth year head coach Jon Newlee, played their home games at the Cowan Spectrum with a five early season games at Memorial Gym, and were members of the Big Sky Conference. They finished the season 24–10, 13–5 in Big Sky play to finish in a 3 way tie for second place. They won the Big Sky tournament for the first time since 1985 when they rejoin the Big Sky Conference since 2014 and earn an automatic trip to the NCAA women's tournament where they lost in the first round to Baylor.

== Roster ==
2015–16 Idaho Vandals women's basketball team
Players
Coaches

Pos.	#	Name	Height	Year	Previous school	Hometown
G	1	Christina Salvatore	5 ft 11 in (1.8 m)	Sr	Canyon HS	Anaheim, CA
G	2	Karlee Wilson	5 ft 4 in (1.63 m)	Jr	Lewiston HS	Lewiston, ID
F	4	Brooke Reilly	6 ft 1 in (1.85 m)	Jr	Mt. Spokane HS	Spokane, WA
C	5	Brigitte O'Neill	6 ft 2 in (1.88 m)	Fr	Carey Grammar	Melbourne, Australia
F	11	Tayla Corrigan	6 ft 2 in (1.88 m)	Sr	Mineral Area College	Adelaide, Australia
C	12	Nejra Solo	6 ft 5 in (1.96 m)	RS So	PRVA Gimnazija Zenica	Zenica, Bosnia
F	13	Ali Forde	6 ft 2 in (1.88 m)	Sr	Woodinville HS	Woodinville, WA
G	14	Taylor Pierce	5 ft 7 in (1.7 m)	Fr	La Costa Canyon HS	Carlsbad, CA
G	21	Mikayla Ferenz	5 ft 10 in (1.78 m)	Fr	Walla Walla HS	Walla Walla, WA
G	22	Bethany Krause	5 ft 8 in (1.73 m)	So	Centerville HS	Centerville, OH
G/F	23	Ranae Mokrzycki	6 ft 0 in (1.83 m)	Sr	North Idaho College	Melbourne, Australia
G/F	31	Geraldine McCorkell	6 ft 0 in (1.83 m)	So	Penleigh & Essendon Grammar	Melbourne, Australia
G	32	Agueda Trujillo	6 ft 0 in (1.83 m)	Jr	IES CTEIB	Manacor, Spain
G	35	Connie Ballestero	5 ft 9 in (1.75 m)	Sr	Villa Park HS	Orange, CA
F	44	Sue Winger	6 ft 1 in (1.85 m)	Fr	Mead HS	Spokane, WA

Head coach

- Jon Newlee (San Diego State)

Assistant coach(es)

- Christa Stanford (Idaho State)
- Jeri Jacobson (Upper Iowa)
- Kristi Zeller (Toledo)

Legend

- (C) Team captain
- (S) Suspended
- (I) Ineligible
- (W) Walk-on
- Injured
- Current redshirt

Roster

== Schedule ==
Date time, TV	Rank^{#}	Opponent^{#}	Result	Record	Site (attendance) city, state
Exhibition
11/06/2015*; 5:30 pm		Lewis–Clark State	W 93–58		Memorial Gym; Moscow, ID
Non-conference regular season
11/15/2015*; 2:00 pm		UC Santa Barbara	W 64–42	1–0	Memorial Gym (416); Moscow, ID
11/20/2015*; 6:00 pm		Cal State Northridge	W 106–50	2–0	Memorial Gym (222); Moscow, ID
11/23/2015*; 6:00 pm		Seattle	W 64–60	3–0	Memorial Gym (281); Moscow, ID
11/26/2015*; 10:30 am		vs. No. 15 Duke; Cancún Challenge Mayan Division	L 68–74	3–1	Hard Rock Hotel Riviera Maya (133); Cancún, Mexico
11/27/2015*; 8:00 am		vs. Texas State; Cancún Challenge Mayan Division	W 75–55	4–1	Hard Rock Hotel Riviera Maya (133); Cancún, Mexico
11/28/2015*; 8:00 am		vs. Iowa State; Cancún Challenge Mayan Division	W 97–65	5–1	Hard Rock Hotel Riviera Maya (133); Cancún, Mexico
12/02/2015*; 5:30 pm		Northwest Christian	W 71–48	6–1	Memorial Gym (316); Moscow, ID
12/05/2015*; 2:00 pm		Wyoming	W 61–57	7–1	Cowan Spectrum (315); Moscow, ID
12/09/2015*; 3:30 pm		at Texas Tech	L 62–78	7–2	United Supermarkets Arena (3,194); Lubbock, TX
12/12/2015*; 2:00 pm		at No. 7 Oregon State	L 44–69	7–3	Gill Coliseum (2,834); Corvallis, OR
12/20/2015*; 12:00 pm		Abilene Christian	L 59–71 ^{OT}	7–4	Cowan Spectrum (201); Moscow, ID
12/28/2015*; 2:00 pm		Carroll (MT)	W 75–47	8–4	Cowan Spectrum (243); Moscow, ID
Big Sky regular season
12/31/2015; 2:00 pm		North Dakota	W 92–65	9–4 (1–0)	Cowan Spectrum (346); Moscow, ID
01/02/2016; 2:00 pm		Northern Colorado	W 66–56	10–4 (2–0)	Cowan Spectrum (401); Moscow, ID
01/09/2016; 2:00 pm		Eastern Washington	L 66–74	10–5 (2–1)	Cowan Spectrum (378); Moscow, ID
01/14/2016; 6:00 pm		at Northern Arizona	W 72–51	11–5 (3–1)	Walkup Skydome (309); Flagstaff, AZ
01/16/2016; 6:00 pm		at Southern Utah	W 62–51	12–5 (4–1)	Centrum Arena (558); Cedar City, UT
01/21/2016; 6:00 pm		Montana	W 78–61	13–5 (5–1)	Cowan Spectrum (1,021); Moscow, ID
01/23/2016; 2:00 pm		Montana State	L 59–62	13–6 (5–2)	Cowan Spectrum (874); Moscow, ID
01/28/2016; 7:00 pm		at Sacramento State	W 98–88	14–6 (6–2)	Hornets Nest (427); Sacramento, CA
01/30/2016; 2:00 pm		at Portland State	W 94–65	15–6 (7–2)	Peter Stott Center (283); Portland, OR
02/04/2016; 6:00 pm		Southern Utah	W 93–48	16–6 (8–2)	Cowan Spectrum (674); Moscow, ID
02/06/2016; 6:00 pm		Northern Arizona	W 76–59	17–6 (9–2)	Cowan Spectrum (622); Moscow, ID
02/11/2016; 6:00 pm		at Northern Colorado	L 68–70	17–7 (9–3)	Bank of Colorado Arena (802); Greeley, CO
02/13/2016; 5:00 pm		at North Dakota	W 65–59	18–7 (10–3)	Betty Engelstad Sioux Center (1,526); Grand Forks, ND
02/18/2016; 6:00 pm		Portland State	W 84–63	19–7 (11–3)	Cowan Spectrum (678); Moscow, ID
02/20/2016; 2:00 pm		Sacramento State	W 107–60	20–7 (12–3)	Cowan Spectrum (906); Moscow, ID
02/27/2016; 2:00 pm		at Eastern Washington	L 70–84	20–8 (12–4)	Reese Court (890); Cheney, WA
03/02/2016; 6:00 pm		at Weber State	W 77–70	21–8 (13–4)	Dee Events Center (527); Ogden, UT
03/04/2016; 6:00 pm		at Idaho State	L 68–69	21–9 (13–5)	Reed Gym (1,255); Pocatello, ID
Big Sky Women's Tournament
03/09/2016; 8:05 pm		vs. Weber State; Quarterfinals	W 86–83 ^{OT}	22–9	Reno Events Center (1,343); Reno, NV
03/11/2016; 2:35 pm		vs. Eastern Washington; Semifinals	W 86–71	23–9	Reno Events Center (827); Reno, NV
03/12/2016; 1:05 pm		vs. Idaho State; Championship Game	W 67–55	24–9	Reno Events Center (1,090); Reno, NV
NCAA Women's Tournament
03/18/2016*; 2:00 pm, ESPN2	(16 D)	at (1 D) No. 4 Baylor; First Round	L 59–89	24–10	Ferrell Center (4,990); Waco, TX
*Non-conference game. ^{#}Rankings from AP Poll. (#) Tournament seedings in parentheses. D=Dallas Region. All times are in Pacific Time.

== Rankings ==
Regular season polls
Poll	Pre- Season	Week 2	Week 3	Week 4	Week 5	Week 6	Week 7	Week 8	Week 9	Week 10	Week 11	Week 12	Week 13	Week 14	Week 15	Week 16	Week 17	Week 18	Week 19	Final
AP	NR	NR	NR	NR	RV	NR	NR	NR	NR	NR	NR	NR	NR	NR	NR	NR	NR	NR	NR	N/A
Coaches	NR	NR	NR	RV	RV	NR	NR	NR	NR	NR	NR	NR	NR	NR	NR	NR	NR	NR	NR	NR

Legend
	Increase in ranking
	Decrease in ranking
	Not ranked previous week
(RV)	Received Votes

== See also ==
2015–16 Idaho Vandals men's basketball team
