= 2015–16 Weber State Wildcats women's basketball team =

Intercollegiate basketball season

2015–16 Weber State Wildcats women's basketball

WBI, runner-up
- Conference: Big Sky Conference
- Record: 23–12 (11–7 Big Sky)
- Head coach: Bethann Ord (4th season)
- Assistant coaches: JD Gustin; Devan Newman; Matt Thune
- Home arena: Dee Events Center

2015–16 Big Sky women's basketball standings
	Conf.				Overall
Team	W		L	PCT	W		L	PCT
Montana State	14	–	4	.778	21	–	10	.677
Idaho †	13	–	5	.722	24	–	10	.706
Eastern Washington	13	–	5	.722	20	–	12	.625
North Dakota	13	–	5	.722	19	–	14	.576
Montana	12	–	6	.667	20	–	11	.645
Weber State	11	–	7	.611	23	–	12	.657
Sacramento State	10	–	8	.556	14	–	17	.452
Idaho State	8	–	10	.444	18	–	15	.545
Northern Colorado	8	–	10	.444	13	–	16	.448
Northern Arizona	2	–	16	.111	6	–	24	.200
Southern Utah	2	–	16	.111	5	–	25	.167
Portland State	2	–	16	.111	4	–	26	.133
† 2016 Big Sky tournament winner As of March 26, 2016; Rankings from AP poll

The 2015–16 Weber State Wildcats women's basketball team represented Weber State University during the 2015–16 NCAA Division I women's basketball season. The Wildcats were led by fourth-year head coach Bethann Ord and played their home games at the Dee Events Center in Ogden, Utah as members of the Big Sky Conference. They finished the season 23–12, 11–7 in Big Sky play, to finish sixth place. They advanced to the quarterfinals of the Big Sky women's tournament where they lost to Idaho. They were invited to the Women's Basketball Invitational where they defeated New Mexico in the first round, North Dakota in the quarterfinals, USC Upstate in the semifinals, before losing to Louisiana–Lafayette in the championship game.

== Radio Broadcasts ==
All Wildcats games were heard on KWCR with Nick Bailey calling the action. All home games and conference road games were also be streamed with video live online through Watch Big Sky.

== Roster ==
2015–16 Weber State Wildcats women's basketball team
Players
Coaches

Pos.	#	Name	Height	Year	Previous school	Hometown
G	0	Jaiamoni Welch-Coleman	5 ft 3 in (1.6 m)	Fr	Berkeley	Berkeley, CA
F	1	Jocelyn Adams	6 ft 1 in (1.85 m)	So	Skyview	Vancouver, WA
G	2	Deeshyra Thomas	5 ft 6 in (1.68 m)	Jr	Clackamas	Clackamas, OR
G	4	Kailie Quinn	5 ft 9 in (1.75 m)	So	Judge	Salt Lake City, UT
G	11	Dionne Coe	5 ft 6 in (1.68 m)	RS Jr	Murry Bergtraum; Monroe JC	Brooklyn, NY
G	12	Yarden Danan	5 ft 10 in (1.78 m)	Fr	Kiryat Sharet Holon	Rehovot, Israel
G	20	Emily Drake	5 ft 9 in (1.75 m)	Fr	Pullman	Pullman, WA
G	22	Brittany Dunbar	5 ft 8 in (1.73 m)	Sr	St. Petersburg; St. Petersburg College	St. Petersburg, FL
F	23	Tinisha Toussaint	6 ft 2 in (1.88 m)	Sr	Desert Vista	Phoenix, AZ
F	32	Cece Wooten	6 ft 0 in (1.83 m)	So	St. Mary's Academy	Portland, OR
G	34	Regina Okoye	5 ft 10 in (1.78 m)	Sr	El Dorado	Albuquerque, NM
F	41	Tyschal Blake	6 ft 1 in (1.85 m)	Fr	St. Mary's Academy	Portland, OR

Head coach

- Bethann Ord (UMBC)

Assistant coach(es)

- JD Gustin (Montana Western)
- Laura Terry (Louisville)
- Matt Thune (Indiana)

Legend

- (C) Team captain
- (S) Suspended
- (I) Ineligible
- (W) Walk-on
- Injured
- Current redshirt

Roster
Last update: August 17, 2024

== Schedule ==
Date time, TV	Rank^{#}	Opponent^{#}	Result	Record	Site (attendance) city, state
Exhibition
November 5, 2015*; 7:00 p.m.		Western Oregon	W 80–64		Dee Events Center; Ogden, UT
Non-conference regular season
November 13, 2015*; 4:30 p.m., Watch Big Sky		Bethesda	W 86–60	1–0	Dee Events Center; Ogden, UT
November 15, 2015*; 1:00 p.m.		at Denver	W 61–49	2–0	Magness Arena (519); Denver, CO
November 18, 2015*; 7:00 p.m., Watch Big Sky		College of Charleston	L 42–50	2–1	Dee Events Center (521); Ogden, UT
November 22, 2015*; 2:00 p.m., BigWest.tv		at Cal State Fullerton	W 60–40	3–1	Titan Gym (157); Fullerton, CA
November 27, 2015*; 5:00 p.m., TheW.tv		at Portland	W 57–55	4–1	Chiles Center (301); Portland, OR
December 4, 2015*; 6:00 p.m., C-USA Digital		at North Texas; Hospitality Hills Challenge	W 45–38	5–1	The Super Pit (684); Denton, TX
December 5, 2015*; 11:00 a.m.		vs. Stephen F. Austin; Hospitality Hills Challenge	W 56–46	6–1	The Super Pit; Denton, TX
December 10, 2015*; 7:00 p.m., Watch Big Sky		BYU	L 51–68	6–2	Dee Events Center (1,034); Ogden, UT
December 12, 2015*; 2:00 p.m., Watch Big Sky		Utah Valley	W 61–54	7–2	Dee Events Center (783); Ogden, UT
December 21, 2015*; 8:00 p.m.		at Washington	L 56–69	7–3	Alaska Airlines Arena (1,550); Seattle, WA
December 29, 2015*; 7:00 p.m., Watch Big Sky		Westminster	W 79–46	8–3	Dee Events Center (517); Ogden, UT
Big Sky regular season
January 2, 2016; 2:00 p.m., Watch Big Sky		at Idaho State	W 61–46	9–3 (1–0)	Reed Gym (1,005); Pocatello, ID
January 7, 2015; 6:00 p.m., Watch Big Sky		at North Dakota	W 62–56	10–3 (2–0)	Betty Engelstad Sioux Center (1,304); Grand Forks, ND
January 9, 2016; 2:00 p.m., Watch Big Sky		at Northern Colorado	L 63–65	10–4 (2–1)	Bank of Colorado Arena (857); Greeley, CO
January 14, 2016; 12:00 p.m., Watch Big Sky		Portland State	W 102–73	11–4 (3–1)	Dee Events Center; Ogden, UT
January 16, 2016; 2:00 p.m., Watch Big Sky		Sacramento State	W 77–66	12–4 (4–1)	Dee Events Center (527); Ogden, UT
January 23, 2016; 2:00 p.m., Watch Big Sky		Idaho State	L 57–58	12–5 (4–2)	Dee Events Center (948); Ogden, UT
January 28, 2016; 6:30 p.m., Watch Big Sky		at Northern Arizona	W 76–56	13–5 (5–2)	Walkup Skydome (352); Flagstaff, AZ
January 30, 2016; 2:00 p.m., Watch Big Sky		at Southern Utah	W 70–51	14–5 (6–2)	Centrum Arena (815); Cedar City, UT
February 4, 2016; 7:00 p.m., Watch Big Sky		Northern Colorado	W 82–77 ^{3OT}	15–5 (7–2)	Dee Events Center (623); Ogden, UT
February 6, 2016; 2:00 p.m., Watch Big Sky		North Dakota	L 78–85 ^{OT}	15–6 (7–3)	Dee Events Center (527); Ogden, UT
February 11, 2016; 8:00 p.m., Watch Big Sky		at Sacramento State	L 64–87	15–7 (7–4)	Hornets Nest (443); Sacramento, CA
February 13, 2016; 3:00 p.m., Watch Big Sky		at Portland State	W 75–58	16–7 (8–4)	Peter Stott Center (365); Portland, OR
February 18, 2016; 7:00 p.m., Watch Big Sky		Southern Utah	W 75–56	17–7 (9–4)	Dee Events Center (607); Ogden, UT
February 20, 2016; 2:00 p.m., Watch Big Sky		Northern Arizona	W 95–88 ^{OT}	18–7 (10–4)	Dee Events Center (591); Ogden, UT
February 25, 2016; 7:00 p.m., Watch Big Sky		at Montana State	L 71–92	18–8 (10–5)	Worthington Arena (1,452); Bozeman, MT
February 27, 2016; 2:00 p.m., Watch Big Sky		at Montana	L 75–84	18–9 (10–6)	Dahlberg Arena (3,257); Missoula, MT
March 2, 2016; 7:00 p.m., Watch Big Sky		Idaho	L 70–77	18–10 (10–7)	Dee Events Center (527); Ogden, UT
March 4, 2016; 7:00 p.m., Watch Big Sky		Eastern Washington	W 80–74	19–10 (11–7)	Dee Events Center (786); Ogden, UT
Big Sky women's tournament
March 7, 2016; 9:05 p.m., Watch Big Sky		vs. Portland State; First round	W 91–68	20–10	Reno Events Center (1,274); Reno, NV
March 9, 2016; 9:05 p.m., Watch Big Sky		vs. Idaho; Quarterfinals	L 83–86	20–11	Reno Events Center (1,343); Reno, NV
WBI
March 16, 2016*; 7:00 p.m.		at New Mexico; First round	W 75–67	21–11	Johnson Gymnasium (581); Albuquerque, NM
March 20, 2016*; 6:00 p.m.		at North Dakota; Quarterfinals	W 76–74	22–11	Betty Engelstad Sioux Center (862); Grand Forks, ND
March 23, 2016*; 7:00 p.m.		USC Upstate; Semifinals	W 79–53	23–11	Dee Events Center (1,323); Ogden, UT
March 26, 2016*; 3:00 p.m.		at Louisiana–Lafayette; Championship game	L 85–87 ^{2OT}	23–12	Earl K. Long Gymnasium (636); Lafayette, LA
*Non-conference game. ^{#}Rankings from AP poll. (#) Tournament seedings in parentheses. All times are in Mountain.

== See also ==
- 2015–16 Weber State Wildcats men's basketball team
