= Robin Selvig =

American women's college basketball coach

Biographical details
- Born: August 21, 1952 (age 74); Outlook, Montana, U.S.

Playing career
- 1970–1974: Montana
- Position: Guard

Coaching career (HC unless noted)
- 1974–1975: Montana (men's JV)
- 1975–1978: Plentywood HS
- 1978–2016: Montana

Head coaching record
- Overall: 865–286 (.752)
- Tournaments: 6–22 (NCAA)

Accomplishments and honors

Championships
- 2× NWBL (1981, 1982); 5× MWAC regular season (1983, 1984, 1986–1988); 4× MWAC Tournament (1983, 1984, 1986, 1988); 18× Big Sky regular season (1989–1991, 1993–1998, 2000, 2004, 2005, 2007–2009, 2013, 2015); 17× Big Sky tournament (1988–1992, 1994–1998, 2000, 2004, 2005, 2008, 2009, 2013, 2015)

Awards
- 5× MWAC Coach of the Year (1983, 1984, 1986–1988); 15× Big Sky Coach of the Year (1989–1992, 1994–1997, 2004, 2005, 2007–2009, 2013, 2015)

Robin Selvig (born August 21, 1952) is an American former women's college basketball coach. Selvig completed his 38th and final season as head coach of the Lady Griz women's basketball team at the University of Montana, in 2015–16. Selvig finished his career ranked eighth among all women's basketball coaches in victories with 865.

== Head coaching record ==
Record table
Season	Team	Overall	Conference	Standing	Postseason
Montana Lady Griz (Northwest Women's Basketball League) (1978–1982)
1978–79	Montana	13–13	5–6	2nd (Mountain)	
1979–80	Montana	19–10	7–6	2nd (Mountain)	
1980–81	Montana	22–8	9–3	1st (Mountain)	
1981–82	Montana	22–5	12–0	1st (Mountain)	AIAW First Round
Montana Lady Griz (Mountain West Athletic Conference) (1982–1988)
1982–83	Montana	26–4	13–1	1st	NCAA first round
1983–84	Montana	26–4	14–0	1st	NCAA second round
1984–85	Montana	22–10	11–3	T–2nd	
1985–86	Montana	27–4	13–1	1st	NCAA second round
1986–87	Montana	26–5	12–0	1st	
1987–88	Montana	28–2	15–1	1st	NCAA second round
Montana Lady Griz (Big Sky Conference) (1988–2016)
1988–89	Montana	27–4	16–0	1st	NCAA second round
1989–90	Montana	27–3	16–0	1st	NCAA first round
1990–91	Montana	26–4	16–0	1st	NCAA first round
1991–92	Montana	23–7	13–3	2nd	NCAA second round
1992–93	Montana	23–5	13–1	2nd	
1993–94	Montana	25–5	12–2	1st	NCAA second round
1994–95	Montana	26–7	12–2	1st	NCAA second round
1995–96	Montana	24–5	13–1	1st	NCAA first round
1996–97	Montana	25–4	16–0	1st	NCAA first round
1997–98	Montana	24–6	15–1	1st	NCAA first round
1998–99	Montana	12–16	7–9	5th	
1999–00	Montana	22–8	13–3	1st	NCAA first round
2000–01	Montana	21–9	11–5	2nd	
2001–02	Montana	19–10	10–4	3rd	
2002–03	Montana	20–10	10–4	3rd	
2003–04	Montana	27–5	14–0	1st	NCAA first round
2004–05	Montana	22–8	13–1	1st	NCAA first round
2005–06	Montana	21–7	10–4	2nd	
2006–07	Montana	27–4	15–1	1st	
2007–08	Montana	25–7	13–3	1st	NCAA first round
2008–09	Montana	28–5	15–1	1st	NCAA first round
2009–10	Montana	15–14	10–6	T–2nd	
2010–11	Montana	18–15	10–6	4th	NCAA first round
2011–12	Montana	16–14	9–7	5th	
2012–13	Montana	24–8	16–4	1st	NCAA first round
2013–14	Montana	23–11	14–6	3rd	
2014–15	Montana	24–9	14–4	1st	NCAA first round
2015–16	Montana	20–11	12–6	5th	
Montana:		865–286 (.752)	455–109 (.807)		
Total:		865–286 (.752)			
National champion Postseason invitational champion Conference regular season champion Conference regular season and conference tournament champion Division regular season champion Division regular season and conference tournament champion Conference tournament champion

== Personal life ==
A native of Outlook, Montana, Selvig came from a family of eight children. Selvig graduated from the University of Montana in the spring of 1974 with a degree in health and physical education. His brother, Doug, and sister, Sandy, were both University of Montana basketball letterwinners. Doug Selvig’s daughter Carly and son Derrick both played basketball at the University of Montana. Sandy's youngest daughter, Jordan Sullivan, also played for the Lady Griz under Rob's leadership with her cousin Carly. Sullivan is currently the assistant coach for the Lady Griz.

Robin Selvig and his wife, Janie, have two adult sons, and two grandkids.

Selvig has also served as the director of the Montana Special Olympics and as a spokesman for Missoula Youth Homes and is the chairman of the 2011 Missoula Heart Walk.

== See also ==
- List of college women's basketball career coaching wins leaders
