= 2015–16 Idaho State Bengals women's basketball team =

Intercollegiate basketball season

2015–16 Idaho State Bengals women's basketball
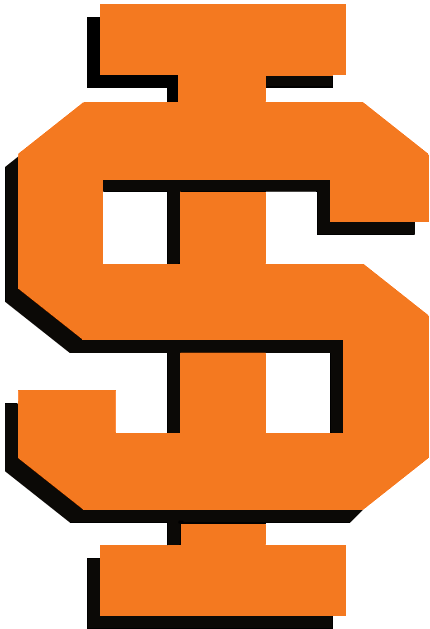
- Conference: Big Sky Conference
- Record: 18–15 (8–10 Big Sky)
- Head coach: Seton Sobolewski (8th season)
- Assistant coaches: Mike Trujillo; Ryan Johnson; Andrea Videbeck
- Home arena: Reed Gym

2015–16 Big Sky women's basketball standings
	Conf.				Overall
Team	W		L	PCT	W		L	PCT
Montana State	14	–	4	.778	21	–	10	.677
Idaho †	13	–	5	.722	24	–	10	.706
Eastern Washington	13	–	5	.722	20	–	12	.625
North Dakota	13	–	5	.722	19	–	14	.576
Montana	12	–	6	.667	20	–	11	.645
Weber State	11	–	7	.611	23	–	12	.657
Sacramento State	10	–	8	.556	14	–	17	.452
Idaho State	8	–	10	.444	18	–	15	.545
Northern Colorado	8	–	10	.444	13	–	16	.448
Northern Arizona	2	–	16	.111	6	–	24	.200
Southern Utah	2	–	16	.111	5	–	25	.167
Portland State	2	–	16	.111	4	–	26	.133
† 2016 Big Sky tournament winner As of March 26, 2016; Rankings from AP poll

The 2015–16 Idaho State Bengals women's basketball team represented Idaho State University during the 2015–16 NCAA Division I women's basketball season. The Bengals, led by eighth year head coach Seton Sobolewski, played their home games at Reed Gym. They were members of the Big Sky Conference. They finished the season 18–15, 8–10 in Big Sky play to finish in a tie for eighth place. They advanced to the championship game of the Big Sky women's tournament where they lost to their in-state rival Idaho.

== Roster ==
2015–16 Idaho State Bengals women's basketball team
Players
Coaches

Pos.	#	Name	Height	Year	Previous school	Hometown
G	2	Grace Kenyon	6 ft 0 in (1.83 m)	RS So	Bainbridge HS	Bainbridge Island, WA
G	3	Saylair Grandon	5 ft 10 in (1.78 m)	Fr	Westview HS	Phoenix, AZ
G	4	Juliet Jones	5 ft 9 in (1.75 m)	So	Cathedral Catholic HS	San Diego, CA
G	10	Freya Newton	5 ft 10 in (1.78 m)	RS Jr	Freyberg HS; Gillette College	Palmerston North, New Zealand
F	11	Sai Tapasa	6 ft 2 in (1.88 m)	Fr	Central HS	Monmouth, OR
G	12	Brook Blair	5 ft 8 in (1.73 m)	Jr	Rangitoto College; Northeastern Junior College	Murrays Bay, New Zealand
F	14	Anna Policicchio	6 ft 2 in (1.88 m)	Sr	St. Mary's College	Sault Ste. Marie, ON
F	20	April Dawson	6 ft 2 in (1.88 m)	Jr	Boulder HS	Boulder, CO
G	21	Isabel Vara de Rey	5 ft 9 in (1.75 m)	Fr	Ciudad de Los Adelantados	Santa Cruz de Tenerife, Canary Islands
F	22	Lindsay Brown	6 ft 1 in (1.85 m)	RS So	Arlington HS	Arlington, WA
G	25	Apiphany Woods	5 ft 10 in (1.78 m)	Sr	Marshall HS; State Fair CC	Chicago, IL
F	30	Megan Hochstein	6 ft 1 in (1.85 m)	So	Rocky Mountain HS	Meridian, ID
F	32	Jenna Morch	6 ft 2 in (1.88 m)	RS Fr	Lebanon HS	Lebanon, OR
G	33	Stephanie Somers	5 ft 11 in (1.8 m)	So	Lynden HS	Lynden, WA
F	34/23	Tressa Lyman	6 ft 1 in (1.85 m)	Sr	Enterprise HS	St. George, UT
G	44	Britanny Kochenderfer	5 ft 10 in (1.78 m)	Fr	Henley HS	Klamath Falls, OR

Head coach

- Seton Sobolewski (Northern Arizona)

Assistant coach(es)

- Michael Trujillo (Northern Arizona)
- Ryan Johnson (DePauw)
- Andrea Videbeck (Idaho State)

Legend

- (C) Team captain
- (S) Suspended
- (I) Ineligible
- (W) Walk-on
- Injured
- Current redshirt

Roster

== Schedule ==
Date time, TV	Rank^{#}	Opponent^{#}	Result	Record	Site (attendance) city, state
Exhibition
11/07/2015*; 7:00 pm		Western Oregon	W 73–56		Reed Gym; Pocatello, ID
Non-conference regular season
11/13/2015*; 6:00 pm		Colorado Christian	W 82–56	1–0	Reed Gym (896); Pocatello, ID
11/19/2015*; 6:00 pm		at No. 20 Northwestern	L 36–72	1–1	Welsh-Ryan Arena (420); Evanston, IL
11/21/2015*; 10:00 am		at No. 23 Michigan State	L 60–79	1–2	Breslin Center (4,984); East Lansing, MI
11/24/2015*; 5:30 pm		at Texas Tech	L 64–79	1–3	United Supermarkets Arena (2,917); Lubbock, TX
11/27/2015*; 4:30 pm		vs. Southeast Missouri State; UTEP Thanksgiving Classic semifinals	W 65–64	2–3	Don Haskins Center; El Paso, TX
11/28/2015*; 7:05 pm		at UTEP; UTEP Thanksgiving Classic championship	L 54–67	2–4	Don Haskins Center (859); El Paso, TX
12/05/2015*; 2:00 pm		Seattle	W 83–67	3–4	Reed Gym (871); Pocatello, ID
12/08/2015*; 7:00 pm		Utah State	W 81–67	4–4	Reed Gym (924); Pocatello, ID
12/11/2015*; 7:00 pm		at Boise State	W 80–77	5–4	Taco Bell Arena (498); Boise, ID
12/18/2015*; 7:00 pm		Montana Tech	W 82–55	6–4	Reed Gym (745); Pocatello, ID
12/29/2015*; 3:00 pm		at Utah Valley	W 56–47	7–4	UCCU Center (209); Orem, UT
Big Sky regular season
01/02/2016; 2:00 pm		Weber State	L 46–61	7–5 (0–1)	Reed Gym (1,005); Pocatello, ID
01/07/2016; 7:00 pm		at Northern Colorado	L 47–48	7–6 (0–2)	Bank of Colorado Arena (565); Greeley, CO
01/09/2016; 1:00 pm		at North Dakota	L 42–45	7–7 (0–3)	Betty Engelstad Sioux Center (1,389); Grand Forks, ND
01/14/2016; 7:00 pm		Sacramento State	L 59–68	7–8 (0–4)	Reed Gym (926); Pocatello, ID
01/16/2016; 2:00 pm		Portland State	W 71–70	8–8 (1–4)	Reed Gym (941); Pocatello, ID
01/23/2016; 2:00 pm		at Weber State	W 58–57	9–8 (2–4)	Dee Events Center (948); Ogden, UT
01/28/2016; 7:00 pm		at Southern Utah	W 71–67	10–8 (3–4)	Centrum Arena (1,051); Cedar City, UT
01/30/2016; 6:30 pm		at Northern Arizona	L 63–65	10–9 (3–5)	Walkup Skydome (421); Flagstaff, AZ
02/04/2016; 7:00 pm		North Dakota	L 57–60	10–10 (3–6)	Reed Gym (800); Pocatello, ID
02/06/2016; 2:00 pm		Northern Colorado	L 59–61	10–11 (3–7)	Reed Gym (963); Pocatello, ID
02/11/2016; 1:00 pm		at Portland State	W 64–42	11–11 (4–7)	Peter Stott Center (928); Portland, OR
02/13/2016; 3:05 pm		at Sacramento State	L 62–83	11–12 (4–8)	Hornets Nest (284); Sacramento, CA
02/18/2016; 7:00 pm		Northern Arizona	W 71–61	12–12 (5–8)	Reed Gym (826); Pocatello, ID
02/20/2016; 2:00 pm		Southern Utah	W 64–47	13–12 (6–8)	Reed Gym (1,132); Pocatello, ID
02/25/2016; 7:00 pm		at Montana	L 47–62	13–13 (6–9)	Dahlberg Arena (3,708); Missoula, MT
02/27/2016; 8:00 pm		at Montana State	L 80–82	13–14 (6–10)	Worthington Arena (2,139); Bozeman, MT
03/02/2016; 7:00 pm		Eastern Washington	W 71–62	14–14 (7–10)	Reed Gym (998); Pocatello, ID
03/04/2016; 7:00 pm		Idaho	W 69–68	15–14 (8–10)	Reed Gym (1,255); Pocatello, ID
Big Sky Women's Tournament
03/07/2016; 1:05 pm		vs. Northern Colorado; First Round	W 54–45	16–14	Reno Events Center; Reno, NV
03/09/2016; 1:05 pm		vs. Montana State; Quarterfinals	W 52–50	17–14	Reno Events Center (1,104); Reno, NV
03/11/2016; 1:05 pm		vs. North Dakota; Semifinals	W 69–54	18–14	Reno Events Center (1,080); Reno, NV
03/12/2016; 1:05 pm		vs. Idaho; Championship Game	L 55–67	18–15	Reno Events Center (1,090); Reno, NV
*Non-conference game. ^{#}Rankings from AP Poll. (#) Tournament seedings in parentheses. All times are in Mountain Time.

== See also ==
2015–16 Idaho State Bengals men's basketball team
