= 2016 Big Sky Conference women's basketball tournament =

- Classification: Division I
- Season: 2015–16
- Teams: 12
- Site: Reno Events Center; Reno, NV
- Champions: Idaho (2nd title)
- Winning coach: Jon Newlee (1st title)
- MVP: Mikayla Ferenz (Idaho)
- Attendance: 9,578
- Television: Watch Big Sky

2015–16 Big Sky women's basketball standings
	Conf.				Overall
Team	W		L	PCT	W		L	PCT
Montana State	14	–	4	.778	21	–	10	.677
Idaho †	13	–	5	.722	24	–	10	.706
Eastern Washington	13	–	5	.722	20	–	12	.625
North Dakota	13	–	5	.722	19	–	14	.576
Montana	12	–	6	.667	20	–	11	.645
Weber State	11	–	7	.611	23	–	12	.657
Sacramento State	10	–	8	.556	14	–	17	.452
Idaho State	8	–	10	.444	18	–	15	.545
Northern Colorado	8	–	10	.444	13	–	16	.448
Northern Arizona	2	–	16	.111	6	–	24	.200
Southern Utah	2	–	16	.111	5	–	25	.167
Portland State	2	–	16	.111	4	–	26	.133
† 2016 Big Sky tournament winner As of March 26, 2016; Rankings from AP poll

The 2016 Big Sky Conference women's basketball tournament was a tournament from March 7–12, 2016. This was the first year in which all Big Sky members competed in the conference tournament. All 12 teams met at the Reno Events Center for the right to advance to the 2016 NCAA tournament. The arena seats roughly 5,000. Idaho defeated Idaho State to win their 2nd Big Sky tournament title for the first time since 1985 before returning to the Big Sky in 2014 and earn an automatic trip to the NCAA women's tournament.

== Seeds ==
Big Sky Tiebreaker procedures are as follows:

1. Head-to-head
2. Performance against conference teams in descending order to finish
3. Higher RPI
4. Coin Flip

Seed	School	Conference	Overall*	Tiebreaker
1	Montana State	14–4	21–8	
2	Eastern Washington	13–5	21–9	3–1 vs. IDAHO, UND
3	Idaho	13–5	21–9	2–2 vs. EWU, UND
4	North Dakota	13–5	17–12	1–3 vs. EWU, IDAHO
5	Montana	12–6	19–10	
6	Weber State	11–7	19–10	
7	Sacramento State	10–8	13–16	
8	Northern Colorado	8–10	15–14	2–0 vs. ISU
9	Idaho State	8–10	15–14	0–2 vs. UNC
10	Southern Utah	2–16	5–25	2–1 vs. NAU, PSU
11	Portland State	2–16	4–25	1–1 vs. NAU, SUU
12	Northern Arizona	2–16	6–13	1–2 vs. SUU, PSU

* Overall record at end of regular season.

== Schedule ==
Session	Game	Time*	Matchup^{#}	Television	Attendance
First Round – Monday, March 7
1	1	12:05 PM	#8 Northern Colorado vs. #9 Idaho State	Watch Big Sky	277
1	2	2:35 PM	#5 Montana vs. #12 Northern Arizona	Watch Big Sky	277
2	3	5:35 PM	#7 Sacramento State vs. #10 Southern Utah	Watch Big Sky	1,274
2	4	8:05 PM	#6 Weber State vs. #11 Portland State	Watch Big Sky	1,274
Quarterfinals – Wednesday, March 9
3	5	12:05 PM	#1 Montana State vs. #9 Idaho State	Watch Big Sky	1,104
3	6	2:35 PM	#4 North Dakota vs. #5 Montana	Watch Big Sky	1,263
4	7	5:35 PM	#2 Eastern Washington vs. #7 Sacramento State	Watch Big Sky	1,320
4	8	8:05 PM	#3 Idaho vs. #6 Weber State	Watch Big Sky	1,343
Semifinals – Friday, March 11
5	9	12:05 PM	#9 Idaho State vs. #4 North Dakota	Watch Big Sky	1,080
5	10	2:35 PM	#2 Eastern Washington vs. #3 Idaho	Watch Big Sky	827
Championship Game – Saturday, March 12
6	11	12:05 PM	#9 Idaho State vs. #3 Idaho	Watch Big Sky	1,090
*Game Times in PT.

== Bracket ==
First round Monday, March 7 Watch Big Sky
8	Northern Colorado	45
9	Idaho State	54
5	Montana	78
12	Northern Arizona	63
7	Sacramento State	102
10	Southern Utah	89
6	Weber State	91
11	Portland State	68

Quarterfinals; Wednesday, March 9 Watch Big Sky
1	Montana State	50
9	Idaho State	52
4	North Dakota	65
5	Montana	62
2	Eastern Washington	100
7	Sacramento State	97
3	Idaho	86^{OT}
6	Weber State	83

Semifinals; Friday, March 11; Watch Big Sky
9	Idaho State	69
4	North Dakota	54
2	Eastern Washington	71
3	Idaho	86

Championship; Saturday, March 12; Watch Big Sky
9	Idaho State	55
3	Idaho	67

== See also ==
- 2016 Big Sky Conference men's basketball tournament
