= 2015–16 Northern Colorado Bears women's basketball team =

Intercollegiate basketball season

2015–16 Northern Colorado Bears women's basketball
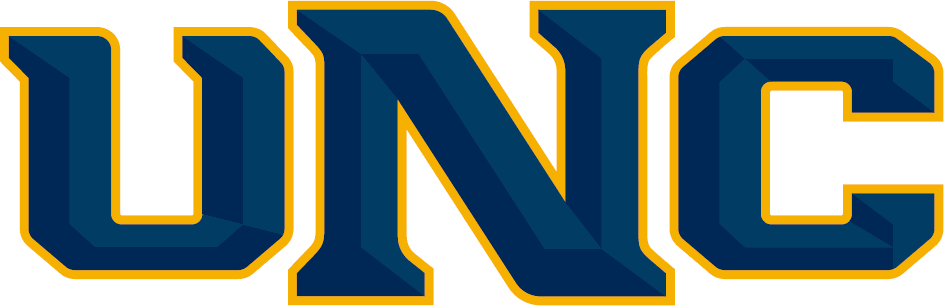
- Conference: Big Sky Conference
- Record: 13–16 (8–10 Big Sky)
- Head coach: Kamie Ethridge (2nd season)
- Assistant coaches: Kelly Moylan; Laurie Koehn; Austin Thoms
- Home arena: Bank of Colorado Arena

2015–16 Big Sky women's basketball standings
	Conf.				Overall
Team	W		L	PCT	W		L	PCT
Montana State	14	–	4	.778	21	–	10	.677
Idaho †	13	–	5	.722	24	–	10	.706
Eastern Washington	13	–	5	.722	20	–	12	.625
North Dakota	13	–	5	.722	19	–	14	.576
Montana	12	–	6	.667	20	–	11	.645
Weber State	11	–	7	.611	23	–	12	.657
Sacramento State	10	–	8	.556	14	–	17	.452
Idaho State	8	–	10	.444	18	–	15	.545
Northern Colorado	8	–	10	.444	13	–	16	.448
Northern Arizona	2	–	16	.111	6	–	24	.200
Southern Utah	2	–	16	.111	5	–	25	.167
Portland State	2	–	16	.111	4	–	26	.133
† 2016 Big Sky tournament winner As of March 26, 2016; Rankings from AP poll

The 2015–16 Northern Colorado Bears women's basketball team represented the University of Northern Colorado during the 2015–16 NCAA Division I women's basketball season. The Bears are led by second year head coach Kamie Ethridge and played their home games at the Bank of Colorado Arena. They were a member of the Big Sky Conference. They finished the season 13–16, 8–10 in Big Sky play to finish in a tie for eighth place. They lost in the first round of the Big Sky women's tournament to Idaho State.

== Roster ==
2015–16 Northern Colorado Bears women's basketball team
Players
Coaches

Pos.	#	Name	Height	Year	Previous school	Hometown
G	1	Shelby Dougherty	5 ft 9 in (1.75 m)	RS Jr	Troy HS; Seattle	Fullerton, CA
G	2	Savannah Scott	5 ft 7 in (1.7 m)	So	Westmont HS	Campbell, CA
G	3	Alilah Jennings	5 ft 10 in (1.78 m)	Fr	Presentation HS	San Jose, CA
G	4	Kirsten Kramer	5 ft 8 in (1.73 m)	Fr	Clark HS	San Antonio, TX
G	5	Jamie Derrieux	5 ft 10 in (1.78 m)	RS Jr	Grand Junction HS	Grand Junction, CO
G	10	Savannah Smith	5 ft 6 in (1.68 m)	RS Fr	Fossil Ridge HS	Fort Collins, CO
C	13	Courtney Smith	6 ft 3 in (1.91 m)	Fr	Legacy HS	Thornton, CO
F	14	Kourteney Zadina	6 ft 2 in (1.88 m)	Jr	Seward HS	Seward, NE
G	15	Katie Longwell	5 ft 6 in (1.68 m)	Jr	Chaparral HS	Parker, CO
F	22	Danielle Noble	6 ft 0 in (1.83 m)	Fr	South HS	Cheyenne, WY
C	23	Ashleen Quirke	6 ft 3 in (1.91 m)	Fr	Los Gatos HS	Los Gatos, CA
G	24	Kyleigh Hiser	5 ft 9 in (1.75 m)	Sr	Laramie HS	Laramie, WY
F/C	31	Rebecca Howell	6 ft 1 in (1.85 m)	Sr	Bishop Machebeuf Catholic HS	Denver, CO
G	33	Kianna Williams	5 ft 9 in (1.75 m)	So	Lake Elsinore HS	Perris, CA

Head coach

- Kamie Ethridge (Texas)

Assistant coach(es)

- Kelly Moylan (Kansas State)
- Laurie Koehn (Kansas State)
- Austin Thoms (Taylor)

Legend

- (C) Team captain
- (S) Suspended
- (I) Ineligible
- (W) Walk-on
- Injured
- Current redshirt

Roster

== Schedule ==
Date time, TV	Rank^{#}	Opponent^{#}	Result	Record	Site (attendance) city, state
Exhibition
11/08/2015*; 2:00 pm		Colorado Christian	L 58–61		Bank of Colorado Arena (390); Greeley, CO
Non-conference regular season
11/13/2015*; 7:00 pm		at Denver	W 60–51	1–0	Magness Arena (633); Denver, CO
11/16/2015*; 7:00 pm		Western State Colorado	W 101–48	2–0	Bank of Colorado Arena (590); Greeley, CO
11/19/2015*; 7:00 pm		at Colorado	L 41–63	2–1	Coors Events Center (1,597); Boulder, CO
11/22/2015*; 6:00 pm		Saint Mary's	L 52–65	2–2	Bank of Colorado Arena (521); Greeley, CO
11/27/2015*; 3:00 pm		vs. Akron; San Diego Central Classic	W 78–65	3–2	Jenny Craig Pavilion; San Diego, CA
11/28/2015*; 3:00 pm		vs. Valparaiso; San Diego Central Classic	W 77–63	4–2	Jenny Craig Pavilion; San Diego, CA
12/01/2015*; 7:00 pm		Utah State	W 74–60	5–2	Bank of Colorado Arena (567); Greeley, CO
12/05/2015*; 3:00 pm		at South Dakota State	L 62–66	5–3	Frost Arena (2,449); Brookings, SD
12/08/2015*; 7:00 pm, CET		Colorado State	L 46–62	5–4	Bank of Colorado Arena (907); Greeley, CO
12/15/2015*; 7:00 pm		No. 20 South Florida	Cancelled		Bank of Colorado Arena; Greeley, CO
12/21/2015*; 2:00 pm		at Grand Canyon	L 59–69	5–5	GCU Arena (262); Phoenix, AZ
Big Sky regular season
12/31/2015; 4:00 pm		at Eastern Washington	L 55–59	5–6 (0–1)	Reese Court (119); Cheney, WA
01/02/2016; 3:00 pm		at Idaho	L 56–66	5–7 (0–2)	Cowan Spectrum (401); Moscow, ID
01/07/2016; 7:00 pm, CET		Idaho State	W 48–47	6–7 (1–2)	Bank of Colorado Arena (656); Greeley, CO
01/09/2016; 2:00 pm		Weber State	W 65–63	7–7 (2–2)	Bank of Colorado Arena (857); Greeley, CO
01/14/2016; 7:00 pm		at Montana	L 46–58	7–8 (2–3)	Dahlberg Arena (2,638); Missoula, MT
01/16/2016; 2:00 pm		at Montana State	L 58–66	7–9 (2–4)	Worthington Arena (1,493); Bozeman, MT
01/21/2016; 7:00 pm		Southern Utah	W 64–44	8–9 (3–4)	Bank of Colorado Arena (844); Greeley, CO
01/23/2016; 2:00 pm		Northern Arizona	W 79–55	9–9 (4–4)	Bank of Colorado Arena (858); Greeley, CO
01/30/2016; 6:00 pm		at North Dakota	L 51–54	9–10 (4–5)	Betty Engelstad Sioux Center (1,806); Grand Forks, ND
02/04/2016; 7:00 pm		at Weber State	L 77–82 ^{3OT}	9–11 (4–6)	Dee Events Center (623); Ogden, UT
02/06/2016; 2:00 pm		at Idaho State	W 61–59	10–11 (5–6)	Reed Gym (963); Pocatello, ID
02/11/2016; 7:00 pm		Idaho	W 70–68	11–11 (6–6)	Bank of Colorado Arena (802); Greeley, CO
02/13/2016; 2:00 pm		Eastern Washington	L 57–66	11–12 (6–7)	Bank of Colorado Arena (904); Greeley, CO
02/20/2016; 2:00 pm		North Dakota	L 58–59	11–13 (6–8)	Bank of Colorado Arena (740); Greeley, CO
02/25/2016; 8:00 pm		at Sacramento State	L 72–83	11–14 (6–9)	Hornets Nest (489); Sacramento, CA
02/27/2016; 3:00 pm		at Portland State	W 70–59	12–14 (7–9)	Peter Stott Center (186); Portland, OR
03/02/2016; 7:00 pm		Montana State	W 80–73	13–14 (8–9)	Bank of Colorado Arena (890); Greeley, CO
03/04/2016; 7:00 pm		Montana	L 66–72 ^{OT}	13–15 (8–10)	Bank of Colorado Arena (790); Greeley, CO
Big Sky Women's Tournament
03/07/2016; 1:05 pm		vs. Idaho State; First Round	L 45–54	13–16	Reno Events Center; Reno, NV
*Non-conference game. ^{#}Rankings from AP Poll. (#) Tournament seedings in parentheses. All times are in Mountain Time.

== See also ==
2015–16 Northern Colorado Bears men's basketball team
