= Nate Harris (basketball) =

American basketball coach and former player

Current position
- Title: Head coach
- Team: Montana
- Conference: Big Sky
- Record: 18–30 (.375)
- Annual salary: $135,000

Biographical details
- Born: Ronan, Montana, United States

Playing career
- 2003–2007: Montana Tech
- Position: Guard

Coaching career (HC unless noted)

Men's basketball
- 2008–2010: Montana Tech (assistant)
- 2010–2011: Fresno Pacific (assistant)

Women's basketball
- 2011–2014: Montana State Billings (assistant)
- 2014–2016: Montana State (assistant)
- 2016–2018: Montana State (associate HC)
- 2018–2019: Angelo State (assistant)
- 2019–2021: Angelo State
- 2021–2023: Montana (assistant)
- 2023–2025: Montana (associate HC)
- 2025–present: Montana

Head coaching record
- Overall: 37–53 (.411)

Nate Harris is an American basketball coach and former player, who is the current head coach of the Montana Lady Griz basketball team.

== Early life and education ==
Harris was born in Ronan, Montana.

== Coaching career ==
On April 27, 2021, Harris was hired as an assistant coach for the Montana Lady Griz basketball team of the Big Sky Conference. During his two-years as head coach of Angelo State, Harris had an overall record of 19–23 (.452). After Brian Holsinger's leave of absence as head coach on January 16, 2026, Harris was named interim head coach for the remainder of the 2024–25 season.

On March 18, 2025, Harris signed a three-year contract to become the eighth head coach in University of Montana program history. The contract has a base salary of $135,000 per year, in addition to performance bonuses.
