= Brian Holsinger =

American college basketball coach

Biographical details
- Born: Republic, Washington, U.S.
- Education: Western Washington (1999)

Playing career
- 1994–1995: Pacific

Coaching career (HC unless noted)
- 1999–2005: Master's (assistant)
- 2005–2007: Montana Tech
- 2007–2014: Washington State (assistant)
- 2014–2015: Washington State (associate HC)
- 2016–2021: Oregon State (associate HC)
- 2021–2025: Montana

Brian Holsinger is an American basketball coach and former player, who most recently served as the former head coach of the Montana Lady Griz basketball team.

== Coaching career ==
On April 13, 2021, Holsinger was hired as the seventh head coach of the Montana Lady Griz basketball team. On January 16, 2025 it was announced that Holsinger was put on leave from the university. On February 10, 2025, Holsinger resigned as head coach of the University of Montana.

== Head coaching record ==
Record table
Season	Team	Overall	Conference	Standing	Postseason
Montana Lady Griz (Big Sky) (2021–2025)
2021–22	Montana	19–11	12–8	4th	
2022–23	Montana	14–16	10–8	5th	
2023–24	Montana	23–10	13–5	3rd	
2024–25	Montana	5–10	1–3		
Montana:		61–47 (.565)	36–24 (.600)		
Total:		0–0 (–)			
National champion Postseason invitational champion Conference regular season champion Conference regular season and conference tournament champion Division regular season champion Division regular season and conference tournament champion Conference tournament champion
