= Montana Lady Griz basketball =

American college basketball team

Montana Lady Griz
2025–26 Montana Lady Griz basketball team
- University: University of Montana
- First season: 1974–75
- Head coach: Nate Harris (2nd season)
- Location: Missoula, Montana
- Arena: Dahlberg Arena (capacity: 7,500)
- Conference: Big Sky
- Nickname: Lady Griz
- Colors: Maroon and silver
- Student section: The Zoo
- All-time record: 897–334

NCAA Division I tournament second round
- 1984, 1986, 1988, 1989, 1992, 1994, 1995

NCAA Division I tournament appearances
- 1983, 1984, 1986, 1988, 1989, 1990, 1991, 1992, 1994, 1995, 1996, 1997, 1998, 2000, 2004, 2005, 2008, 2009, 2011, 2013, 2015

AIAW tournament appearances
- 1982

Conference tournament champions
- 1983, 1984, 1986, 1988, 1989, 1990, 1991, 1993, 1994, 1995, 1996, 1997, 1998, 2000, 2004, 2005, 2008, 2009, 2011, 2013, 2015

Conference regular-season champions
- 1983, 1984, 1986, 1987, 1988, 1989, 1990, 1991, 1992, 1994, 1995, 1996, 1997, 1998, 2000, 2004, 2005, 2007, 2008, 2009, 2011, 2013, 2015

Uniforms
Home	Away

The University of Montana Grizzlies women's basketball team, known as the Lady Griz is an NCAA Division I college women's basketball team competing in the Big Sky Conference. Home games are played at Dahlberg Arena located inside the University of Montana's Adams Center.

== Current roster ==
2024–25 Montana Lady Griz women's basketball team
Players
Coaches

Pos.	#	Name	Height	Year	Previous school	Hometown
G	1	Macy Donarski	5 ft 8 in (1.73 m)	RS Fr	Aquinas High School	La Crosse, Wisconsin
G	2	Mack Konig	5 ft 9 in (1.75 m)	Jr	King's Christian Collegiate	Milton, Ontario
G	3	Draya Wacker	5 ft 8 in (1.73 m)	RS Fr	Melstone High School	Melstone, Montana
G	5	Tyler McCliment-Call	6 ft 0 in (1.83 m)	GS	Stephen F. Austin	Spokane, Washington
G	10	Avery Waddington	6 ft 3 in (1.91 m)	Fr	Lake City High School	Coeur d'Alene, Idaho
G	11	Aby Shubert	5 ft 8 in (1.73 m)	So	Xavier	Kasson, Minnesota
G	12	Chloe Larsen	5 ft 10 in (1.78 m)	Fr	Hellgate High School	Missoula, Montana
F	13	Izabella Zingaro	6 ft 4 in (1.93 m)	RS Jr	Iowa State	Bolton, Ontario
G	14	Lauren Dick	5 ft 10 in (1.78 m)	Jr	Hellgate High School	Missoula, Montana
C	15	Imogen Greenslade	6 ft 4 in (1.93 m)	RS Sr	Arizona State	Sydney, Australia
G	23	MJ Bruno	5 ft 11 in (1.8 m)	Sr	Portland	Spokane, Washington
G	33	Adria Lincoln	6 ft 1 in (1.85 m)	So	Monroe High School	Monroe, Washington
F	34	Alex Pirog	6 ft 3 in (1.91 m)	Jr	Highlands Ranch High School	Highlands Ranch, Colorado
F	40	Dani Bartsch	6 ft 2 in (1.88 m)	Sr	Capital High School	Helena, Montana

Head coach

- Brian Holsinger (Western Washington)

Assistant coach(es)

- Nate Harris (Montana Tech)
- Lindsay Woolley (Montana)
- Emma List (Florida Gulf Coast)
- Kayla Anderson (Utah Valley)

Legend

- (C) Team captain
- (S) Suspended
- (I) Ineligible
- (W) Walk-on
- Injured
- Current redshirt

Roster
Last update: January 15, 2025

== Postseason results ==
=== NCAA Division I ===
The Lady Griz have appeared in the NCAA Division I men's basketball tournament 21 times. They have a record of 6–21.

Year	Seed	Round	Opponent	Result
1983		Opening Round	Northeast Louisiana	L 53–72
1984	#4	First Round; Second Round	Oregon State; USC	W 56–47; L 51–76
1986	#8	First Round; Second Round	Utah; USC	W 58–46; L 50–81
1988	#4	Second Round	Stanford	L 72–74 (OT)
1989	#10	First Round; Second Round	Cal State Fullerton; Texas	W 82–67; L 54–83
1990	#9	First Round	Hawaii	L 78–83
1991	#11	First Round	Iowa	L 53–64
1992	#11	First Round; Second Round	Wisconsin; USC	W 85–74; L 59–71
1994	#7	First Round; Second Round	UNLV; Stanford	W 77–67; L 62–66
1995	#12	First Round; Second Round	San Diego State; Purdue	W 57–46; L 51–62
1996	#12	First Round	NC State	L 68–77
1997	#9	First Round	Texas Tech	L 45–47
1998	#14	First Round	Florida	L 64–85
2000	#16	First Round	Georgia	L 46–74
2004	#12	First Round	Louisiana Tech	L 77–81
2005	#12	First Round	Vanderbilt	L 44–67
2008	#13	First Round	Vanderbilt	L 62–75
2009	#13	First Round	Pittsburgh	L 35–64
2011	#14	First Round	UCLA	L 47–55
2013	#13	First Round	Georgia	L 50–70
2015	#16	First Round	Notre Dame	L 43–77

=== AIAW Division I ===
The Lady Griz made one appearance in the AIAW National Division I basketball tournament, with a combined record of 0–1.

Year	Round	Opponent	Result
1982	First Round	Wayland Baptist	L 52–57

== Season-by-season records ==
Statistics overview
Season	Coach	Overall	Conference	Standing	Postseason
Diane Westbrok (Northwest Basketball League) (1974–1975)
1974–1975	Diane Westbrok	11–8			
Barbara Eisenbarth (Northwest Basketball League) (1975–1976)
1975–1976	Barbara Eisenbarth	9–13			
Eddye McClure (Northwest Basketball League) (1976–1978)
1976–1977	Eddye McClure	4–14	1–9		
1977–1978	Eddye McClure	7–13	3–10		
Eddye McClure:		11–27	4–19		
Robin Selvig (Mountain West Athletic Conference (1982–88) / Big Sky Conference (1988–2016)) (1978–2016)
1978–1979	Robin Selvig	13–13	5–6	5th	
1979–1980	Robin Selvig	19–10	7–6	4th	
1980–1981	Robin Selvig	22–8	9–3		
1981–1982	Robin Selvig	22–5	12–0	1st	AIAW first round
1982–1983	Robin Selvig	26–4	13–1	1st	NCAA 1st Round
1983–1984	Robin Selvig	26–4	14–0	1st	NCAA 2nd Round
1984–1985	Robin Selvig	22–10	11–3	2nd	Mountain West tournament Championship
1985–1986	Robin Selvig	27–4	13–1	1st	NCAA 2nd Round
1986–1987	Robin Selvig	26–5	12–0	1st	Mountain West tournament Championship
1987–1988	Robin Selvig	28–2	15–1	1st	NCAA 2nd Round
1988–1989	Robin Selvig	27–4	16–0	1st	NCAA 2nd Round
1989–1990	Robin Selvig	27–3	16–0	1st	NCAA 1st Round
1990–1991	Robin Selvig	26–4	16–0	1st	NCAA 1st Round
1991–1992	Robin Selvig	23–7	13–3	2nd	NCAA 2nd Round
1992–1993	Robin Selvig	23–5	13–1	2nd	Big Sky tournament championship
1993–1994	Robin Selvig	25–5	12–2	1st	NCAA 2nd Round
1994–1995	Robin Selvig	26–7	12–2	1st	NCAA 2nd Round
1995–1996	Robin Selvig	24–5	13–1	1st	NCAA 1st Round
1996–1997	Robin Selvig	25–4	16–0	1st	NCAA 1st Round
1997–1998	Robin Selvig	24–6	15–1	1st	NCAA 1st Round
1998–1999	Robin Selvig	12–16	7–9	5th	Big Sky tournament Semifinal
1999–2000	Robin Selvig	22–8	13–3	1st	NCAA 1st Round
2000–2001	Robin Selvig	21–9	11–5	2nd	Big Sky tournament championship
2001–2002	Robin Selvig	19–10	10–4	3rd	Big Sky tournament Semifinal
2002–2003	Robin Selvig	20–10	10–4	3rd	Big Sky tournament Semifinal
2003–2004	Robin Selvig	27–5	14–0	1st	NCAA 1st Round
2004–2005	Robin Selvig	22–8	13–1	1st	NCAA 1st Round
2005–2006	Robin Selvig	21–7	10–4	2nd	Big Sky tournament Semifinal
2006–2007	Robin Selvig	27–4	15–1	1st	Big Sky tournament Semifinal
2007–2008	Robin Selvig	25–7	13–3	1st	NCAA 1st Round
2008–2009	Robin Selvig	28–5	15–1	1st	NCAA 1st Round
2009–2010	Robin Selvig	15–14	10–6	2nd	Big Sky tournament Semifinal
2010–2011	Robin Selvig	18–15	10–6	4th	NCAA 1st Round
2011–2012	Robin Selvig	16–14	9–7	5th	Big Sky tournament Quarterfinal
2012–2013	Robin Selvig	24–8	16–4	1st	NCAA
2013–2014	Robin Selvig	23–11	14–6	3rd	Big Sky tournament
2014–2015	Robin Selvig	24–9	14–4	5th	NCAA 1st Round
2015–2016	Robin Selvig	20–11	12–6	5th	Big Sky tournament 2nd round
Robin Selvig:		865–286	455–109		
Shannon Schweyen (Big Sky Conference) (2016–2020)
2016–2017	Shannon Schweyen	7–23	4–14	11th	
2017–2018	Shannon Schweyen	14–17	9–9	T-7th	
2018–2019	Shannon Schweyen	14–16	9-11	6th	
2019–2020	Shannon Schweyen	17–13	12–8	5th	
Shannon Schweyen:		52–69	34–42		
Mike Petrino (Big Sky Conference) (2020–2021)
2020–2021	Mike Petrino	12–11	9–8	6th	
Mike Petrino:		12–11	9–8		
Total:		961–414	498–168		
National champion Postseason invitational champion Conference regular season champion Conference regular season and conference tournament champion Division regular season champion Division regular season and conference tournament champion Conference tournament champion

== NCAA tournament results ==
The Lady Griz have appeared in 21 NCAA tournaments, with a record of 6−21.

Year	Seed	Round	Opponent	Result
1983	#9	First Round	#8 Louisiana-Monroe	L 53−72
1984	#4	First Round; Sweet Sixteen	#5 Oregon State #1 USC	W 56−47; L 51−76
1986	#8	First Round; Second Round	#9 Utah #1 USC	W 58−46; L 50−81
1988	#4	First Round	#5 Stanford	L 72−74 (OT)
1989	#10	First Round; Second Round	#7 Cal State Fullerton #2 Texas	W 82−67; L 54−83
1990	#8	First Round	#9 Hawaii	L 78−83
1991	#11	First Round	#6 Iowa	L 53−64
1992	#11	First Round; Second Round	#6 Wisconsin #3 USC	W 85−74; L 59−71
1994	#7	First Round; Second Round	#10 UNLV #2 Stanford	W 77−67; L 62−66
1995	#12	First Round; Second Round	#5 San Diego State #4 Purdue	W 57−46; L 51−62
1996	#12	First Round	#5 NC State	L 68−77
1997	#9	First Round	#8 Texas Tech	L 45−47
1998	#14	First Round	#3 Florida	L 64−85
2000	#16	First Round	#1 Georgia	L 46−74
2004	#12	First Round	#5 Louisiana Tech	L 77−81
2005	#12	First Round	#5 Vanderbilt	L 44−67
2008	#13	First Round	#4 Vanderbilt	L 62−75
2009	#13	First Round	#4 Pittsburgh	L 35−64
2011	#14	First Round	#3 UCLA	L 47−55
2013	#13	First Round	#4 Georgia	L 50−70
2015	#16	First Round	#1 Notre Dame	L 43−77
