= Port Hacking High School =

Coordinates: 34°02′S 151°06′E

- Miranda, New South Wales; Australia

Information
- School type: Public comprehensive coeducational secondary school
- Motto: Ardentibus nil Ardui
- Principal: Rick Turansky
- Grades: 7–12
- Enrolment: ~1114 (2018)
- Website: porthackin-h.schools.nsw.gov.au/

Port Hacking High School is a high school situated in the Sutherland Shire, in the south east region of Sydney, New South Wales. It was opened in 1959 and was the first comprehensive high school within the Sutherland Shire Council to provide education up to and including the Higher School Certificate level.

Port Hacking takes in students from local primary schools including Yowie bay and Miranda. While not officially specialized, the school does focus on the performing arts. It offers dance, drama, music, and debating classes.

== Notable alumni ==
- Vanessa Badham - columnist, writer and activist
- Dylan Wright - singer-songwriter, and Australian Idol winner
- Soane Ta'ai - 2026 Australian Schoolboys Rugby union team representative
