= Chris Boettcher =

American basketball coach

Personal information
- Born: October 28, 1968 (age 58) Weiser, Idaho

Career information
- High school: Weiser (Weiser, Idaho)
- College: Brigham Young University (1989-1994)
- Position: Head coach

Career history

Coaching
- 2001-2009: Utah Valley (associate)
- 2009-2013: Brigham Young (asst)
- 2013-2014: Shiga Lakestars
- 2014-2018: Southern Utah

Career highlights

Chris Boettcher (クリス・ベッチャー, Kurisu Beccha) is the former Head coach of the Shiga Lakestars in the Japanese Bj League. He lived in Takayama, Gifu, from 1997-2000 while serving a Mormon mission and teaching hoops to players ranging in age from elementary school to junior college.

== Head coaching record ==
Legend
Regular season	G	Games coached	W	Games won	L	Games lost	W–L %	Win–loss %
Playoffs	PG	Playoff games	PW	Playoff wins	PL	Playoff losses	PW–L %	Playoff win–loss %

Team	Year	G	W	L	W–L%	Finish	PG	PW	PL	PW–L%	Result
Shiga Lakestars	2013-14	52	27	25	.519	3rd in Western	6	3	3	.500	Lost in 2nd round
