= 2015–16 Arizona Wildcats women's basketball team =

Intercollegiate basketball season

2015–16 Arizona Wildcats women's basketball
- Conference: Pac-12 Conference
- Record: 13–19 (3–15 Pac-12)
- Head coach: Niya Butts (8th season)
- Assistant coaches: E.C. Hill; Sean LeBeauf; Calamity McEntire
- Home arena: McKale Center

2015–16 Pac-12 Conference women's basketball standings
	Conf.				Overall
Team	W		L	PCT	W		L	PCT
No. 6 Oregon State †	16	–	2	.889	32	–	5	.865
No. 11 Arizona State	16	–	2	.889	26	–	7	.788
No. 13 Stanford	14	–	4	.778	27	–	8	.771
No. 10 UCLA	14	–	4	.778	26	–	9	.743
Washington	11	–	7	.611	26	–	11	.703
Oregon	9	–	9	.500	24	–	11	.686
Utah	8	–	10	.444	18	–	15	.545
USC	6	–	12	.333	19	–	13	.594
Washington State	5	–	13	.278	14	–	16	.467
California	4	–	14	.222	15	–	17	.469
Arizona	3	–	15	.167	13	–	19	.406
Colorado	2	–	16	.111	7	–	23	.233
† 2016 Pac-12 Tournament winner As of April 3, 2016; Rankings from AP Poll

The 2015–16 Arizona Wildcats women's basketball team represented University of Arizona during the 2015–16 NCAA Division I women's basketball season. The Wildcats, led by eighth-year head coach Niya Butts, played their games at the McKale Center and were members of the Pac-12 Conference. They finished the season 13–19, 3–15 in Pac-12 play to finish in eleventh place. They advanced to the quarterfinals of the Pac-12 women's basketball tournament where they lost to UCLA.

== Roster ==
2015–16 Arizona Wildcats women's basketball team
Players
Coaches

Pos.	#	Name	Height	Year	Previous school	Hometown
F	0	Breanna Workman	6 ft 1 in (1.85 m)	Jr	Centennial HS	Las Vegas, NV
G	3	Taryn Griffey	5 ft 7 in (1.7 m)	So	Dr. Phillips HS	Seattle, WA
G	10	Lauren Evans	5 ft 11 in (1.8 m)	Sr	Hamilton HS	Phoenix, AZ
G	11	Cherice Harris	5 ft 8 in (1.73 m)	So	Etiwanda HS	Rancho Cucamonga, CA
C	13	Eugenie Simonet-Keller	6 ft 8 in (2.03 m)	Fr	IMG Academy	La Bigot, France
G	14	Malena Washington	5 ft 6 in (1.68 m)	Jr	Central HS	Beaumont, TX
G	15	Keyahndra Cannon	5 ft 9 in (1.75 m)	Sr	Mission Bay HS	San Diego, CA
G	20	Farrin Bell	6 ft 0 in (1.83 m)	RS Jr	Richardson HS	Richardson, TX
F	21	Destiny Graham	6 ft 3 in (1.91 m)	Fr	Eastside College Prep	East Palo Alto, CA
G	23	Michal Miller	5 ft 7 in (1.7 m)	Fr	Michigan City HS	Michigan City, IN
F	24	LaBrittney Jones	6 ft 1 in (1.85 m)	Jr	Cedar Hill HS	Cedar Hill, TX
F	31	Dejza James	6 ft 1 in (1.85 m)	Jr	Pleasant Grove HS	Elk Grove, CA
G	33	JaLea Bennett	6 ft 0 in (1.83 m)	So	Mansfield Timberview HS	Grand Prairie, TX
F	42	A'Shanti Coleman	6 ft 2 in (1.88 m)	Fr	Sacred Heart Cathedral Prep	San Francisco, CA
G	44	Charise Holloway	5 ft 9 in (1.75 m)	So	St. Mary' HS	Tracy, CA

Head coach

- Niya Butts (Tennessee)

Assistant coach(es)

- E.C. Hill (Northern Illinois)
- Sean LeBeauf (Montevallo)
- Calamity McEntire (Tennessee)

Legend

- (C) Team captain
- (S) Suspended
- (I) Ineligible
- (W) Walk-on
- Injured
- Current redshirt

Roster

== Schedule ==
Date time, TV	Rank^{#}	Opponent^{#}	Result	Record	Site (attendance) city, state
Exhibition
11/10/2015*; 7:00 pm		Eastern New Mexico	W 71–37		McKale Center (1,003); Tucson, AZ
Non-conference regular season
11/14/2015*; 10:00 am, ESPN3		at Toledo	W 62–59	1–0	Savage Arena (3,713); Toledo, OH
11/18/2015*; 7:00 pm		Howard	W 65–28	2–0	McKale Center (778); Tucson, AZ
11/21/2015*; 3:00 pm, TheW.tv		at San Diego	L 54–59	2–1	Jenny Craig Pavilion (714); San Diego, CA
11/23/2015*; 11:00 am		Kansas	W 67–52	3–1	McKale Center (6,652); Tucson, AZ
11/27/2015*; 12:00 pm		at North Texas	W 51–44	4–1	The Super Pit (961); Denton, TX
12/02/2015*; 7:00 pm		New Mexico State	W 68–64	5–1	McKale Center (741); Tucson, AZ
12/05/2015*; 1:00 pm		Pacific	W 69–56	6–1	McKale Center (765); Tucson, AZ
12/10/2015*; 7:00 pm		Louisiana Tech	W 77–67	7–1	McKale Center (827); Tucson, AZ
12/19/2015*; 2:30 pm		vs. SMU; Puerto Rico Classic	L 46–58	7–2	Coliseo Rubén Zayas Montañez; Trujillo Alto, PR
12/20/2015*; 12:30 pm		vs. Florida Gulf Coast; Puerto Rico Classic	L 55–57	7–3	Coliseo Rubén Zayas Montañez; Trujillo Alto, PR
12/21/2015*; 2:30 pm		vs. Gardner–Webb; Puerto Rico Classic	W 79–60	8–3	Coliseo Rubén Zayas Montañez; Trujillo Alto, PR
12/29/2015*; 2:00 pm		George Mason	W 68–60 ^{OT}	9–3	McKale Center (990); Tucson, AZ
Pac-12 regular season
01/02/2016; 3:00 pm, P12N		No. 11 Stanford	L 34–59	9–4 (0–1)	McKale Center (1,491); Tucson, AZ
01/04/2016; 8:00 pm, P12N		No. 21 California	W 57–52	10–4 (1–1)	McKale Center (728); Tucson, AZ
01/08/2016; 8:00 pm		at Washington State	L 46–67	10–5 (1–2)	Beasley Coliseum (756); Pullman, WA
01/10/2016; 3:00 pm, P12N		at Washington	L 47–63	10–6 (1–3)	Alaska Airlines Arena (2,913); Seattle, WA
01/15/2016; 7:00 pm		Utah	L 55–60	10–7 (1–4)	McKale Center (1,022); Tucson, AZ
01/17/2016; 2:00 pm, P12N		Colorado	W 63–52	11–7 (2–4)	McKale Center (967); Tucson, AZ
01/22/2016; 7:00 pm, P12N		at No. 8 Arizona State; State Farm Territorial Cup Series	L 48–61	11–8 (2–5)	Wells Fargo Arena (3,455); Tempe, AZ
01/24/2016; 5:00 pm, P12N		No. 8 Arizona State; State Farm Territorial Cup Series	L 47–62	11–9 (2–6)	McKale Center (1,483); Tucson, AZ
01/29/2016; 7:00 pm, P12N		at No. 9 Oregon State	L 43–71	11–10 (2–7)	Gill Coliseum (3,402); Corvallis, OR
01/31/2016; 1:00 pm, P12N		at Oregon	L 54–76	11–11 (2–8)	Matthew Knight Arena (2,301); Eugene, OR
02/05/2016; 8:00 pm, P12N		USC	L 57–67	11–12 (2–9)	McKale Center (1,030); Tucson, AZ
02/07/2016; 1:00 pm		No. 14 UCLA	L 39–73	11–13 (2–10)	McKale Center (843); Tucson, AZ
02/12/2016; 8:30 pm, P12N		at No. 13 Stanford	L 58–82	11–14 (2–11)	Maples Pavilion (3,404); Stanford, CA
02/14/2016; 1:00 pm, P12N		at California	L 56–75	11–15 (2–12)	Haas Pavilion (1,311); Berkeley, CA
02/19/2016; 7:00 pm		Washington	L 52–74	11–16 (2–13)	McKale Center (1,243); Tucson, AZ
02/21/2016; 1:00 pm		Washington State	L 61–62	11–17 (2–14)	McKale Center (1,225); Tucson, AZ
02/26/2016; 9:00 pm, P12N		at No. 14 UCLA	L 53–80	11–18 (2–15)	Pauley Pavilion (1,641); Los Angeles, CA
02/28/2016; 3:00 pm		at USC	W 63–56	12–18 (3–15)	Galen Center (3,433); Los Angeles, CA
Pac-12 Women's Tournament
03/03/2016; 3:00 pm, P12N	(11)	vs. (6) Oregon; First Round	W 74–68	13–18	KeyArena (3,059); Seattle, WA
03/04/2016; 3:00 pm, P12N	(11)	vs. (3) UCLA; Quarterfinals	L 51–72	13–19	KeyArena (3,747); Seattle, WA
*Non-conference game. ^{#}Rankings from AP Poll. (#) Tournament seedings in parentheses. All times are in Mountain Time.

== See also ==
2015–16 Arizona Wildcats men's basketball team

== Notes ==
- March 4, 2016 – The school announced this week that head coach Niya Butts will not return next year
