= 2015–16 Stanford Cardinal women's basketball team =

Intercollegiate basketball season

2015–16 Stanford Cardinal women's basketball

Gulf Coast Showcase champions

NCAA tournament, Elite Eight
- Conference: Pac-12 Conference

Ranking
- Coaches: No. 11
- AP: No. 13
- Record: 27–8 (14–4 Pac-12)
- Head coach: Tara VanDerveer (30th season)
- Assistant coaches: Amy Tucker; Tempie Brown; Kate Paye
- Home arena: Maples Pavilion

2015–16 Pac-12 Conference women's basketball standings
	Conf.				Overall
Team	W		L	PCT	W		L	PCT
No. 6 Oregon State †	16	–	2	.889	32	–	5	.865
No. 11 Arizona State	16	–	2	.889	26	–	7	.788
No. 13 Stanford	14	–	4	.778	27	–	8	.771
No. 10 UCLA	14	–	4	.778	26	–	9	.743
Washington	11	–	7	.611	26	–	11	.703
Oregon	9	–	9	.500	24	–	11	.686
Utah	8	–	10	.444	18	–	15	.545
USC	6	–	12	.333	19	–	13	.594
Washington State	5	–	13	.278	14	–	16	.467
California	4	–	14	.222	15	–	17	.469
Arizona	3	–	15	.167	13	–	19	.406
Colorado	2	–	16	.111	7	–	23	.233
† 2016 Pac-12 Tournament winner As of April 3, 2016; Rankings from AP Poll

The 2015–16 Stanford Cardinal women's basketball team represented Stanford University during the 2015–16 NCAA Division I women's basketball season. The Cardinal, led by thirtieth-year head coach Tara VanDerveer, played their home games at the Maples Pavilion and were members of the Pac-12 Conference. They finished the season 27–8, 14–4 in Pac-12 play to finish in a tie for third place. They lost in the quarterfinals of the Pac-12 women's tournament to Washington. They received an at-large bid to the NCAA women's tournament, where they defeated San Francisco and South Dakota State in the first and second rounds, Notre Dame in the sweet sixteen before losing to Pac-12 member Washington in the elite eight.

== Roster ==
2015–16 Stanford Cardinal women's basketball team
Players
Coaches

Pos.	#	Name	Height	Year	Previous school	Hometown
G	00	Alex Green	5 ft 6 in (1.68 m)	RS Sr	Bishop Lynch	Dallas, TX
G	1	Lili Thompson	5 ft 7 in (1.7 m)	Jr	Timberview	Mansfield, TX
F/C	2	Shannon Coffee	6 ft 5 in (1.96 m)	Fr	Centerville	Dayton, OH
F	5	Kaylee Johnson	6 ft 3 in (1.91 m)	So	Natrona County	Casper, WY
G	10	Briana Roberson	5 ft 7 in (1.7 m)	Jr	Troy	Fullerton, CA
F	11	Alanna Smith	6 ft 3 in (1.91 m)	Fr	Wesley College	Melbourne, Australia
G	12	Brittany McPhee	6 ft 0 in (1.83 m)	So	Mount Rainier	Normandy Park, WA
G	13	Marta Sniezek	5 ft 8 in (1.73 m)	Fr	National Cathedral	McLean, VA
G	22	Alexa Romano	5 ft 10 in (1.78 m)	Fr	La Cueva	Albuquerque, NM
F	24	Erica McCall	6 ft 3 in (1.91 m)	Jr	Ridgeview	Bakersfield, CA
F	32	Kailee Johnson	6 ft 3 in (1.91 m)	Jr	Central Catholic	Portland, OR
F/C	34	Tess Picknell	6 ft 5 in (1.96 m)	Sr	South Medford	Medford, OR
F	44	Karlie Samuelson	5 ft 11 in (1.8 m)	Jr	Mater Dei	Huntington Beach, CA

Head coach

Tara VanDerveer (Indiana)

Assistant coach(es)

Amy Tucker (Ohio State)
Tempie Brown (Michigan)
Kate Paye (Stanford)

Legend

- (C) Team captain
- (S) Suspended
- (I) Ineligible
- (W) Walk-on
- Injured
- Current redshirt

Roster

== Schedule ==
Date time, TV	Rank^{#}	Opponent^{#}	Result	Record	Site (attendance) city, state
Exhibition
11/07/2015*; 1:00 pm	No. 16	Academy of Art	W 81–48		Maples Pavilion (2,479); Stanford, CA
Non-conference regular season
11/13/2015*; 7:30 pm	No. 16	at UC Davis	W 74–45	1–0	The Pavilion (3,366); Davis, CA
11/15/2015*; 1:00 pm	No. 16	at Gonzaga	W 65–48	2–0	McCarthey Athletic Center (6,000); Spokane, WA
11/21/2015*; 12:00 pm	No. 15	No. 22 George Washington	W 84–63	3–0	Maples Pavilion (2,854); Stanford, CA
11/23/2015*; 7:00 pm	No. 13	Santa Clara	L 58–61	3–1	Maples Pavilion (2,668); Stanford, CA
11/27/2015*; 10:30 am	No. 13	vs. Missouri State; Gulf Coast Showcase quarterfinals	W 82–65	4–1	Germain Arena (1,006); Estero, FL
11/28/2015*; 2:00 pm	No. 13	vs. Dayton; Gulf Coast Showcase semifinals	W 74–66	5–1	Germain Arena (1,407); Estero, FL
11/29/2015*; 7:30 pm	No. 13	vs. Purdue; Gulf Coast Showcase championship	W 71–65 ^{OT}	6–1	Germain Arena; Estero, FL
12/13/2015*; 10:00 am, ESPN	No. 14	at No. 5 Texas	L 69–77	6–2	Frank Erwin Center (3,942); Austin, TX
12/16/2015*; 6:00 pm, ESPNU	No. 15	No. 14 Tennessee; Rivalry	W 69–55	7–2	Maples Pavilion (3,768); Stanford, CA
12/19/2015*; 2:00 pm	No. 15	Cornell	W 93–38	8–2	Maples Pavilion (3,015); Stanford, CA
12/22/2015*; 2:00 pm	No. 12	Cal State Bakersfield	W 83–41	9–2	Maples Pavilion (2,625); Stanford, CA
12/28/2015*; 7:00 pm	No. 11	Chattanooga	W 73–30	10–2	Maples Pavilion (3,410); Stanford, CA
Pac-12 regular season
01/02/2016; 2:00 pm, P12N	No. 11	at Arizona	W 59–34	11–2 (1–0)	McKale Center (1,491); Tucson, AZ
01/04/2016; 5:00 pm, P12N	No. 9	at No. 14 Arizona State	L 31–49	11–3 (1–1)	Wells Fargo Arena (1,708); Tempe, AZ
01/08/2016; 7:00 pm	No. 9	Utah	W 72–52	12–3 (2–1)	Maples Pavilion (4,030); Stanford, CA
01/10/2016; 12:00 pm, P12N	No. 9	Colorado	W 71–56	13–3 (3–1)	Maples Pavilion (3,188); Stanford, CA
01/15/2016; 6:00 pm, P12N	No. 11	at Oregon	W 64–62	14–3 (4–1)	Matthew Knight Arena (2,030); Eugene, OR
01/17/2016; 6:00 pm, P12N	No. 11	at No. 12 Oregon State	L 50–58	14–4 (4–2)	Gill Coliseum (4,314); Corvallis, OR
01/22/2016; 8:00 pm, P12N	No. 12	at USC	W 57–47	15–4 (5–2)	Galen Center (612); Los Angeles, CA
01/24/2016; 6:00 pm, P12N	No. 12	at No. 20 UCLA	L 36–56	15–5 (5–3)	Pauley Pavilion (3,061); Los Angeles, CA
01/29/2016; 8:00 pm, P12N	No. 16	No. 25 Washington	W 69–53	16–5 (6–3)	Maples Pavilion (2,858); Stanford, CA
01/31/2016; 12:00 pm, P12N	No. 16	Washington State	W 69–52	17–5 (7–3)	Maples Pavilion (3,421); Stanford, CA
02/02/2016; 7:00 pm, P12N	No. 15	California	W 53–46	18–5 (8–3)	Maples Pavilion (3,268); Stanford, CA
02/05/2016; 7:00 pm, P12N	No. 15	at California	W 60–55	19–5 (9–3)	Haas Pavilion (5,632); Berkeley, CA
02/12/2016; 7:30 pm, P12N	No. 13	Arizona	W 82–58	20–5 (10–3)	Maples Pavilion (3,404); Stanford, CA
02/14/2016; 6:00 pm, P12N	No. 13	No. 9 Arizona State	L 61–63 ^{OT}	20–6 (10–4)	Maples Pavilion (3,250); Stanford, CA
02/19/2016; 7:00 pm, P12N	No. 15	at Colorado	W 80–49	21–6 (11–4)	Coors Events Center (2,312); Boulder, CO
02/21/2016; 1:00 pm, P12N	No. 15	at Utah	W 72–54	22–6 (12–4)	Jon M. Huntsman Center (983); Salt Lake City, UT
02/26/2016; 8:00 pm, P12N	No. 13	No. 7 Oregon State	W 76–54	23–6 (13–4)	Maples Pavilion (3,613); Stanford, CA
02/28/2016; 11:00 am, P12N	No. 13	Oregon	W 69–42	24–6 (14–4)	Maples Pavilion (4,082); Stanford, CA
Pac-12 Women's Tournament
03/04/2016; 8:30 pm, P12N	(4) No. 11	vs. (5) Washington; Quarterfinals	L 65–73	24–7	KeyArena (5,789); Seattle, WA
NCAA Women's Tournament
03/19/2016*; 6:00 pm, ESPN2	(4 L) No. 13	(13 L) San Francisco; First Round	W 85–58	25–7	Maples Pavilion (3,106); Stanford, CA
03/21/2016*; 6:00 pm, ESPN2	(4 L) No. 13	(12 L) South Dakota State; Second Round	W 66–65	26–7	Maples Pavilion (1,961); Stanford, CA
03/25/2016*; 6:30 pm, ESPN	(4 L) No. 13	vs. (1 L) No. 2 Notre Dame; Sweet Sixteen	W 90–84	27–7	Rupp Arena (8,509); Lexington, KY
03/27/2016*; 10:00 am, ESPN	(4 L) No. 13	vs. (7 L) Washington; Elite Eight	L 76–85	27–8	Rupp Arena (3,349); Lexington, KY
*Non-conference game. ^{#}Rankings from AP Poll. (#) Tournament seedings in parentheses. L=Lexington, KY regional. All times are in Pacific Time.

== Rankings ==
Regular season polls
Poll	Pre- season	Week 2	Week 3	Week 4	Week 5	Week 6	Week 7	Week 8	Week 9	Week 10	Week 11	Week 12	Week 13	Week 14	Week 15	Week 16	Week 17	Week 18	Week 19	Final
AP	16	15	13	16	14	15	13	11	9	11	12	16	15	13	15	13	11	13	13	N/A
Coaches	14	10	16	15	12	14	11	11	13	12	14	16	15	14	15	13	12	16	16	11

Legend
	Increase in ranking
	Decrease in ranking
	Not ranked previous week
(RV)	Received votes

== See also ==
- 2015–16 Stanford Cardinal men's basketball team
