= 2015–16 Oregon Ducks women's basketball team =

Intercollegiate basketball season

2015–16 Oregon Ducks women's basketball

WNIT, Semifinals
- Conference: Pac-12 Conference
- Record: 24–11 (9–9 Pac-12)
- Head coach: Kelly Graves (2nd season)
- Assistant coaches: Jodie Berry; Mark Campbell; Nicole Powell
- Home arena: Matthew Knight Arena

2015–16 Pac-12 Conference women's basketball standings
	Conf.				Overall
Team	W		L	PCT	W		L	PCT
No. 6 Oregon State †	16	–	2	.889	32	–	5	.865
No. 11 Arizona State	16	–	2	.889	26	–	7	.788
No. 13 Stanford	14	–	4	.778	27	–	8	.771
No. 10 UCLA	14	–	4	.778	26	–	9	.743
Washington	11	–	7	.611	26	–	11	.703
Oregon	9	–	9	.500	24	–	11	.686
Utah	8	–	10	.444	18	–	15	.545
USC	6	–	12	.333	19	–	13	.594
Washington State	5	–	13	.278	14	–	16	.467
California	4	–	14	.222	15	–	17	.469
Arizona	3	–	15	.167	13	–	19	.406
Colorado	2	–	16	.111	7	–	23	.233
† 2016 Pac-12 Tournament winner As of April 3, 2016; Rankings from AP Poll

The 2015–16 Oregon Ducks women's basketball team represented the University of Oregon during the 2015–16 NCAA Division I women's basketball season. The Ducks, led by second year head coach Kelly Graves, played their games at the Matthew Knight Arena and were members of the Pac-12 Conference. They finished the season 24–11, 9–9 in Pac-12 play to finish in sixth place. They lost in the first round of the Pac-12 women's tournament to Arizona. They were invited to the Women's National Invitation Tournament where they defeated Long Beach State, Fresno State and Utah in the first, second and third rounds, UTEP in the quarterfinals before losing to South Dakota in the semifinals.

== Roster ==
2015–16 Oregon Ducks women's basketball team
Players
Coaches

Pos.	#	Name	Height	Year	Previous school	Hometown
G	4	Maite Cazorla	5 ft 10 in (1.78 m)	Fr	Siglo XXI	Las Palmas, Spain
G	5	Jordan Loera	5 ft 9 in (1.75 m)	RS Sr	Moses Lake HS	Moses Lake, WA
G	10	Lexi Bando	5 ft 9 in (1.75 m)	So	Willamette HS	Eugene, OR
F	11	Liz Brenner	6 ft 1 in (1.85 m)	Sr	Jesuit HS	Portland, OR
G	12	Megan Trinder	5 ft 7 in (1.7 m)	Jr	Northeast CC	Hollywell, Australia
G	13	Mar'Shay Moore	5 ft 8 in (1.73 m)	Jr	Blue Mountain CC; Fort Vancouver HS	Vancouver, WA
F	14	Jillian Alleyne (injured)	6 ft 3 in (1.91 m)	Sr	Summit HS	Fontana, CA
F	15	Jacinta Vandenberg	6 ft 5 in (1.96 m)	RS Jr	Fresno State; Sandringham College	Melbourne, Australia
F	22	Lauren Yearwood	6 ft 3 in (1.91 m)	Fr	Oak Bay HS	Victoria, BC
F	32	Oti Gildon	6 ft 1 in (1.85 m)	Fr	Gonzaga Prep	Spokane, WA
G	33	Lexi Petersen	5 ft 11 in (1.8 m)	Sr	Seattle Christian HS	Tukwila, WA
F	44	Kat Cooper	6 ft 0 in (1.83 m)	RS Sr	Boston College; Auburn Riverside HS	Tacoma, WA
F	51	Katie Gruys	6 ft 0 in (1.83 m)	Sr	Annadale HS	Maple Lake, MN

Head coach

- Kelly Graves (New Mexico)

Assistant coach(es)

- Jodie Berry (Western Washington)
- Mark Campbell (Hawaiʻi)
- Nicole Powell (Stanford)

Legend

- (C) Team captain
- (S) Suspended
- (I) Ineligible
- (W) Walk-on
- Injured
- Current redshirt

Roster

== Schedule ==
Date time, TV	Rank^{#}	Opponent^{#}	Result	Record	Site (attendance) city, state
Exhibition
11/11/2015*; 6:00 pm		Warner Pacific	W 99–46		Matthew Knight Arena; Eugene, OR
Non-conference regular season
11/15/2015*; 9:30 am		at No. 21 North Carolina	W 79–77	1–0	Carmichael Arena (2,036); Chapel Hill, NC
11/19/2015*; 6:00 pm		Hampton	W 86–51	2–0	Matthew Knight Arena (956); Eugene, OR
11/22/2015*; 12:00 pm		UC Santa Barbara	W 79–51	3–0	Matthew Knight Arena (1,468); Eugene, OR
11/24/2015*; 6:00 pm		Clemson	W 69–56	4–0	Matthew Knight Arena (1,188); Eugene, OR
11/28/2015*; 2:00 pm		North Dakota	W 77–51	5–0	Matthew Knight Arena (1,141); Eugene, OR
11/30/2015*; 8:00 pm, P12N		San Jose State	W 104–74	6–0	Matthew Knight Arena (1,066); Eugene, OR
12/05/2015*; 2:00 pm		Utah Valley	W 79–68	7–0	Matthew Knight Arena (1,033); Eugene, OR
12/12/2015*; 2:00 pm		Portland	W 93–52	8–0	Matthew Knight Arena (1,737); Eugene, OR
12/15/2015*; 5:00 pm		UC Riverside	W 95–81	9–0	Matthew Knight Arena (1,481); Eugene, OR
12/17/2015*; 6:00 pm		Portland State	W 122–59	10–0	Matthew Knight Arena (1,258); Eugene, OR
12/28/2015*; 6:00 pm		Seattle	W 82–62	11–0	Matthew Knight Arena (1,923); Eugene, OR
Pac-12 regular season
01/02/2016; 2:00 pm, P12N		at No. 21 UCLA	L 69–80	11–1 (0–1)	Pauley Pavilion (1,443); Los Angeles, CA
01/04/2016; 5:00 pm, P12N		at USC	L 67–75	11–2 (0–2)	Galen Center (565); Los Angeles, CA
01/08/2016; 7:00 pm, P12N		at No. 11 Oregon State; Civil War	L 33–60	11–3 (0–3)	Gill Coliseum (4,462); Corvallis, OR
01/10/2016; 12:00 pm, P12N		No. 11 Oregon State; Civil War	L 45–59	11–4 (0–4)	Matthew Knight Arena (2,806); Eugene, OR
01/17/2016; 2:00 pm, P12N		No. 11 Stanford	L 62–64	11–5 (0–5)	Matthew Knight Arena (2,030); Eugene, OR
01/17/2016; 2:00 pm		California	W 69–59	12–5 (1–5)	Matthew Knight Arena (1,770); Eugene, OR
01/22/2016; 5:00 pm, P12N		at Colorado	W 59–46	13–5 (2–5)	Coors Events Center (3,818); Boulder, CO
01/24/2016; 1:00 pm, P12N		at Utah	W 77–65	14–5 (3–5)	Jon M. Huntsman Center (864); Salt Lake City, UT
01/29/2016; 8:00 pm, P12N		No. 8 Arizona State	L 58–63	14–6 (3–6)	Matthew Knight Arena (1,988); Eugene, OR
01/31/2016; 12:00 pm, P12N		Arizona	W 76–54	15–6 (4–6)	Matthew Knight Arena (2,301); Eugene, OR
02/05/2016; 8:00 pm, P12N		at Washington State	W 73–48	16–6 (5–6)	Beasley Coliseum (784); Pullman, WA
02/07/2016; 12:00 pm		at No. 24 Washington	W 75–63	17–6 (6–6)	Alaska Airlines Arena (1,974); Seattle, WA
02/12/2016; 6:00 pm		Utah	W 69–58	18–6 (7–6)	Matthew Knight Arena (1,889); Eugene, OR
02/14/2016; 4:00 pm, P12N		Colorado	W 77–70	19–6 (8–6)	Matthew Knight Arena (2,032); Eugene, OR
02/19/2016; 6:00 pm, P12N		No. 12 UCLA	L 72–77	19–7 (8–7)	Matthew Knight Arena (2,166); Eugene, OR
02/21/2016; 2:00 pm		USC	W 69–60	20–7 (9–7)	Matthew Knight Arena (2,425); Eugene, OR
02/26/2016; 6:00 pm		at California	L 54–65	20–8 (9–8)	Haas Pavilion (1,543); Berkeley, CA
02/28/2016; 11:00 am, P12N		at No. 13 Stanford	L 42–69	20–9 (9–9)	Maples Pavilion (4,082); Stanford, CA
2016 Pac-12 Tournament
03/03/2016; 2:00 pm, P12N	(6)	vs. (11) Arizona; First Round	L 68–74	20–10	KeyArena (3,059); Seattle, WA
WNIT
03/17/2016*; 6:00 pm		Long Beach State; First Round	W 84–76	21–10	Matthew Knight Arena (870); Eugene, OR
03/21/2016*; 6:00 pm		Fresno State; Second Round	W 84–59	22–10	Matthew Knight Arena (1,142); Eugene, OR
03/23/2016*; 6:00 pm		Utah; Third Round	W 73–63	23–10	Matthew Knight Arena (1,165); Eugene, OR
03/28/2016*; 6:00 pm		at UTEP; Quarterfinals	W 71–67	24–10	Don Haskins Center (9,055); El Paso, TX
03/30/2016*; 5:00 pm		at South Dakota; Semifinals	L 54–88	24–11	DakotaDome (5,080); Vermillion, SD
*Non-conference game. ^{#}Rankings from AP Poll. (#) Tournament seedings in parentheses. All times are in Pacific Time.

== Rankings ==
2015–16 NCAA Division I women's basketball rankings

Regular season polls
Poll	Pre- Season	Week 2	Week 3	Week 4	Week 5	Week 6	Week 7	Week 8	Week 9	Week 10	Week 11	Week 12	Week 13	Week 14	Week 15	Week 16	Week 17	Week 18	Week 19	Final
AP	NR	RV	RV	RV	RV	NR	RV	RV	RV	NR	NR	NR	NR	RV	RV	RV	NR	NR	NR	N/A
Coaches	NR	RV	RV	RV	RV	RV	RV	RV	NR	NR	NR	NR	NR	NR	NR	NR	NR	NR	NR	NR

Legend
	Increase in ranking
	Decrease in ranking
	Not ranked previous week
(RV)	Received Votes

== See also ==
- 2015–16 Oregon Ducks men's basketball team
