= 2015–16 Washington State Cougars women's basketball team =

Intercollegiate basketball season

2015–16 Washington State Cougars women's basketball

Rainbow Wahine Classic champions
- Conference: Pac-12 Conference
- Record: 14–16 (5–13 Pac-12)
- Head coach: June Daugherty (9th season)
- Assistant coaches: Mike Daugherty; Ashley Grover; Rod Jensen
- Home arena: Beasley Coliseum

2015–16 Pac-12 Conference women's basketball standings
	Conf.				Overall
Team	W		L	PCT	W		L	PCT
No. 6 Oregon State †	16	–	2	.889	32	–	5	.865
No. 11 Arizona State	16	–	2	.889	26	–	7	.788
No. 13 Stanford	14	–	4	.778	27	–	8	.771
No. 10 UCLA	14	–	4	.778	26	–	9	.743
Washington	11	–	7	.611	26	–	11	.703
Oregon	9	–	9	.500	24	–	11	.686
Utah	8	–	10	.444	18	–	15	.545
USC	6	–	12	.333	19	–	13	.594
Washington State	5	–	13	.278	14	–	16	.467
California	4	–	14	.222	15	–	17	.469
Arizona	3	–	15	.167	13	–	19	.406
Colorado	2	–	16	.111	7	–	23	.233
† 2016 Pac-12 Tournament winner As of April 3, 2016; Rankings from AP Poll

The 2015–16 Washington State Cougars women's basketball team represented Washington State University during the 2015–16 NCAA Division I women's basketball season. The Cougars, led by ninth-year head coach June Daugherty, played their games at the Beasley Coliseum in Pullman, Washington and were members of the Pac-12 Conference. They finished the season 14–16, 5–13 in Pac-12 play, to finish in ninth place. They lost in the first round of the Pac-12 women's basketball tournament to USC.

== Roster ==
2015–16 Washington State Cougars women's basketball team
Players
Coaches

Pos.	#	Name	Height	Year	Previous school	Hometown
G	1	Caila Hailey	5 ft 10 in (1.78 m)	So	Serra HS	Inglewood, CA
G	2	Krystle McKenzie	5 ft 8 in (1.73 m)	RS Fr	–	Brisbane, Australia
F	4	Louise Brown	6 ft 1 in (1.85 m)	So	–	Melbourne, Australia
G	10	Alexas Williamson	5 ft 9 in (1.75 m)	Sr	Mater Dei	Chino Hills, CA
G	11	Dawnyelle Awa	5 ft 9 in (1.75 m)	Sr	Konawaena HS	Kealakekua, HI
G	12	Taylor Edmundson	5 ft 11 in (1.8 m)	Sr	Carlsbad HS	Carlsbad, NM
F	15	Ivana Kmetovska	6 ft 3 in (1.91 m)	Jr	Orce Nikolov	Skopje, Macedonia
C	20	Maria Kostourkova	6 ft 4 in (1.93 m)	Fr	E.S.P.J.A.L.	Lisbon, Portugal
F	21	Nike McClure	6 ft 3 in (1.91 m)	RS Fr	W. F. West HS	Tenino, WA
G	22	Pinelopi Pavlopoulou	5 ft 8 in (1.73 m)	So	ACS Athens	Athens, Greece
G	23	Alexys Swedlund	5 ft 11 in (1.8 m)	Fr	St. Thomas More HS	Rapid City, SD
C	24	Bianca Blanaru	6 ft 5 in (1.96 m)	So	–	Timișoara, Romania
F	34	Mariah Cooks	6 ft 2 in (1.88 m)	Sr	Ernest Righetti	Santa Maria, CA
F	45	Borislava Hristova	6 ft 0 in (1.83 m)	Fr	Georgi Benkovski	Varna, Bulgaria

Head coach

- June Daugherty (Ohio State)

Assistant coach(es)

- Mike Daugherty (Ohio State)
- Ashley Grover (Washington State)
- Rod Jensen (Redlands)

Legend

- (C) Team captain
- (S) Suspended
- (I) Ineligible
- (W) Walk-on
- Injured
- Current redshirt

Roster
Last update: September 29, 2024

== Schedule ==
Date time, TV	Rank^{#}	Opponent^{#}	Result	Record	Site (attendance) city, state
Exhibition
November 8, 2015*; 1:00 p.m.		Lewis–Clark State	W 79–37		Beasley Coliseum; Pullman, WA
Non-conference regular season
November 13, 2015*; 8:30 p.m.		UC Santa Barbara	W 61–44	1–0	Beasley Coliseum (3,011); Pullman, WA
November 16, 2015*; 7:00 p.m.		Hampton	W 68–61	2–0	Beasley Coliseum (429); Pullman, WA
November 20, 2015*; 6:30 p.m.		vs. Nevada; Rainbow Wahine Classic	W 70–57	3–0	Stan Sheriff Center; Honolulu, HI
November 22, 2015*; 7:00 p.m.		at Hawaii; Rainbow Wahine Classic	W 62–52	4–0	Stan Sheriff Center (2,342); Honolulu, HI
November 27, 2015*; 7:00 p.m.		San Jose State	W 95–80	5–0	Beasley Coliseum (632); Pullman, WA
November 30, 2015*; 5:00 p.m.		at Oklahoma State	L 60–70	5–1	Gallagher-Iba Arena (2,410); Stillwater, OK
December 3, 2015*; 6:00 p.m.		at Boise State	W 57–52	6–1	Taco Bell Arena (863); Boise, ID
December 6, 2015*; 1:00 p.m.		at San Diego	W 78–72	7–1	Jenny Craig Pavilion (774); San Diego, CA
December 8, 2015*; 6:00 p.m., P12N		Gonzaga	W 55–48	8–1	Beasley Coliseum (1,302); Pullman, WA
December 12, 2015*; 1:00 p.m.		at Saint Mary's	L 71–75	8–2	McKeon Pavilion (257); Moraga, CA
December 20, 2015*; 5:00 p.m., ESPN3		at Kansas	W 66–53	9–2	Allen Fieldhouse (2,184); Lawrence, KS
Pac-12 regular season
December 29, 2015; 8:00 p.m., P12N		Washington	L 64–79	9–3 (0–1)	Beasley Coliseum (837); Pullman, WA
January 2, 2016; 4:00 p.m., P12N		at Utah	L 71–73	9–4 (0–2)	Jon M. Huntsman Center (1,151); Salt Lake City, UT
January 4, 2016; 7:00 p.m., P12N		at Colorado	W 74–66	10–4 (1–2)	Coors Events Center (1,595); Boulder, CO
January 8, 2016; 7:00 p.m.		Arizona	W 67–46	11–4 (2–2)	Beasley Coliseum (756); Pullman, WA
January 10, 2016; 12:00 p.m., P12N		No. 14 Arizona State	L 45–63	11–5 (2–3)	Beasley Coliseum (713); Pullman, WA
January 15, 2016; 8:00 p.m., P12N		No. 25 USC	W 73–61	12–5 (3–3)	Beasley Coliseum (772); Pullman, WA
January 17, 2016; 12:00 p.m., P12N		No. 17 UCLA	L 73–75	12–6 (3–4)	Beasley Coliseum (568); Pullman, WA
January 23, 2016; 2:00 p.m., P12N		at Washington	L 63–69	12–7 (3–5)	Alaska Airlines Arena (3,157); Seattle, WA
January 29, 2016; 6:00 p.m., P12N		at California	L 71–74	12–8 (3–6)	Haas Pavilion (1,178); Berkeley, CA
January 31, 2016; 12:00 p.m., P12N		at No. 16 Stanford	L 52–69	12–9 (3–7)	Maples Pavilion (3,421); Stanford, CA
February 5, 2016; 8:00 p.m., P12N		Oregon	L 48–73	12–10 (3–8)	Beasley Coliseum (784); Pullman, WA
February 7, 2016; 11:00 a.m.		No. 9 Oregon State	L 45–54	12–11 (3–9)	Beasley Coliseum (687); Pullman, WA
February 12, 2016; 7:00 p.m.		at No. 14 UCLA	L 61–73	12–12 (3–10)	Pauley Pavilion (1,660); Los Angeles, CA
February 14, 2016; 4:00 p.m., P12N		at USC	L 62–64	12–13 (3–11)	Galen Center (790); Los Angeles, CA
February 19, 2016; 5:00 p.m., P12N		at No. 9 Arizona State	L 39–61	12–14 (3–12)	Wells Fargo Arena (2,851); Tempe, AZ
February 21, 2016; 12:00 p.m.		at Arizona	W 62–61	13–14 (4–12)	McKale Center (1,225); Tucson, AZ
February 25, 2016; 7:00 p.m.		Colorado	W 83–70	14–14 (5–12)	Beasley Coliseum (718); Pullman, WA
February 27, 2016; 11:00 a.m., P12N		Utah	L 69–75	14–15 (5–13)	Beasley Coliseum (788); Pullman, WA
Pac-12 women's tournament
March 3, 2016; 6:00 p.m., P12N	(9)	vs. (8) USC; First round	L 73–77	14–16	KeyArena; Seattle, WA
*Non-conference game. ^{#}Rankings from AP poll. (#) Tournament seedings in parentheses. All times are in Pacific.

== Rankings ==
Regular-season polls
Poll	Pre- season	Week 2	Week 3	Week 4	Week 5	Week 6	Week 7	Week 8	Week 9	Week 10	Week 11	Week 12	Week 13	Week 14	Week 15	Week 16	Week 17	Week 18	Final
AP																			
Coaches																			

Legend
	Increase in ranking
	Decrease in ranking
	Not ranked previous week
(RV)	Received votes

== See also ==
- 2015–16 Washington State Cougars men's basketball team
