= 2015–16 Utah Utes women's basketball team =

Intercollegiate basketball season

2015–16 Utah Utes women's basketball

WNIT, Third Round
- Conference: Pac-12 Conference
- Record: 18–15 (8–10 Pac–12)
- Head coach: Lynne Roberts (1st season)
- Assistant coaches: Gavin Petersen; Danyelle Snelgro; Wesley Brooks
- Home arena: Jon M. Huntsman Center

2015–16 Pac-12 Conference women's basketball standings
	Conf.				Overall
Team	W		L	PCT	W		L	PCT
No. 6 Oregon State †	16	–	2	.889	32	–	5	.865
No. 11 Arizona State	16	–	2	.889	26	–	7	.788
No. 13 Stanford	14	–	4	.778	27	–	8	.771
No. 10 UCLA	14	–	4	.778	26	–	9	.743
Washington	11	–	7	.611	26	–	11	.703
Oregon	9	–	9	.500	24	–	11	.686
Utah	8	–	10	.444	18	–	15	.545
USC	6	–	12	.333	19	–	13	.594
Washington State	5	–	13	.278	14	–	16	.467
California	4	–	14	.222	15	–	17	.469
Arizona	3	–	15	.167	13	–	19	.406
Colorado	2	–	16	.111	7	–	23	.233
† 2016 Pac-12 Tournament winner As of April 3, 2016; Rankings from AP Poll

The 2015–16 Utah Utes women's basketball team represented the University of Utah during the 2015–16 NCAA Division I women's basketball season. The Utes were led by first-year head coach Lynne Roberts. They played their home games at the Jon M. Huntsman Center in Salt Lake City, Utah and were a member of the Pac-12 Conference. They finished the season 18–15, 8–10 in Pac-12 play to finish in seventh place. They lost in the first round of the Pac-12 women's tournament to California. They were invited to the Women's National Invitation Tournament, where they defeated Montana State and Gonzaga in the first and second rounds before losing to Pac-12 member Oregon in the third round.

== Roster ==
2015–16 Utah Utes women's basketball team
Players
Coaches

Pos.	#	Name	Height	Year	Previous school	Hometown
F	0	Jordanna Porter	5 ft 11 in (1.8 m)	Fr	Ellison HS	Killeen, TX
G	1	Gabrielle Bowie	5 ft 9 in (1.75 m)	So	Johnson HS	San Antonio, TX
F	2	Jada Matthews	6 ft 1 in (1.85 m)	So	Long Beach Poly HS	Long Beach, CA
F	3	Malia Nawahine	5 ft 10 in (1.78 m)	RS So	Springville HS	Springville, UT
F	10	Nakia Arquette	6 ft 1 in (1.85 m)	RS Jr	Lewis and Clark HS	Spokane, WA
G	11	Erika Bean	5 ft 8 in (1.73 m)	Fr	Bradshaw Christian HS	Sacramento, CA
F	12	Emily Potter	6 ft 5 in (1.96 m)	RS So	Glenlawn Collegiate	Winnipeg, MB
G	13	Devri Owens	5 ft 8 in (1.73 m)	RS So	Plano West HS	Plano, TX
G	14	Paige Crozon	6 ft 1 in (1.85 m)	RS Jr	Humboldt Collegiate Institute	Humboldt, SK
G	20	Katie Kuklok	5 ft 10 in (1.78 m)	Sr	Utah Valley	Poway, CA
F	21	Wendy Anae	6 ft 3 in (1.91 m)	Jr	Cathedral Catholic HS	San Diego, CA
G	22	Danielle Rodriguez	5 ft 10 in (1.78 m)	Sr	Warren HS	Downey, CA
G	24	Valerie Nawahine	5 ft 9 in (1.75 m)	Jr	BYU	Springville, UT
F	32	Tanaeya Boclair	6 ft 0 in (1.83 m)	So	Brennan HS	San Antonio, TX
C	33	Joeseta Fatuesi	6 ft 4 in (1.93 m)	So	Wilcox HS	Santa Clara, CA

Head coach

- Lynne Roberts (Seattle Pacific)

Assistant coach(es)

- Gavin Petersen (Hawaiʻi)
- Danyelle Snelgro (Utah State)
- Wesley Brooks (West Virginia)

Legend

- (C) Team captain
- (S) Suspended
- (I) Ineligible
- (W) Walk-on
- Injured
- Current redshirt

Roster

== Schedule and results ==
Date time, TV	Rank^{#}	Opponent^{#}	Result	Record	Site (attendance) city, state
Exhibition
11/06/2015*; 7:00 pm		Fort Lewis	W 77–69		Jon M. Huntsman Center (348); Salt Lake City, UT
Non-conference regular season
11/13/2015*; 4:45 pm		South Dakota	W 66–59	1–0	Jon M. Huntsman Center (844); Salt Lake City, UT
11/17/2015*; 7:00 pm		Lamar	W 71–67	2–0	Jon M. Huntsman Center (543); Salt Lake City, UT
11/20/2015*; 7:00 pm		George Mason	W 74–62	3–0	Jon M. Huntsman Center (792); Salt Lake City, UT
11/26/2015*; 2:15 pm		vs. No. 21 Oklahoma; Junkanoo Jam Reef Division	L 55–70	3–1	Grand Lucayan Resort (353); Freeport, BAH
11/27/2015*; 6:00 pm		vs. Boston College; Junkanoo Jam Reef Division	L 51–76	3–2	Grand Lucayan Resort (453); Freeport, BAH
12/03/2015*; 7:00 pm		Cal State Northridge	W 97–56	4–2	Jon M. Huntsman Center (908); Salt Lake City, UT
12/09/2015*; 7:00 pm		Creighton	W 74–58	5–2	Jon M. Huntsman Center (805); Salt Lake City, UT
12/12/2015*; 2:00 pm, BYUtv		at BYU; Deseret First Duel	L 59–73	5–3	Marriott Center (1,183); Provo, UT
12/19/2015*; 7:00 pm		Fresno State	W 78–63	6–3	Jon M. Huntsman Center (726); Salt Lake City, UT
12/22/2015*; 1:00 pm, MW Net		at Utah State	W 64–61	7–3	Smith Spectrum (354); Logan, UT
12/29/2015*; 7:00 pm		UC Davis	W 88–58	8–3	Jon M. Huntsman Center (885); Salt Lake City, UT
Pac-12 regular season
01/02/2015; 5:00 pm, P12N		Washington State	W 73–71	9–3 (1–0)	Jon M. Huntsman Center (1,151); Salt Lake City, UT
01/04/2015; 6:00 pm, P12N		Washington	W 88–83	10–3 (2–0)	Jon M. Huntsman Center (884); Salt Lake City, UT
01/08/2015; 8:00 pm		at No. 9 Stanford	L 52–72	10–4 (2–1)	Maples Pavilion (4,030); Stanford, CA
01/10/2015; 3:00 pm		at No. 21 California	W 84–79	11–4 (3–1)	Haas Pavilion; Berkeley, CA
01/15/2015; 7:00 pm		at Arizona	W 60–55	12–4 (4–1)	McKale Center (1,022); Tucson, AZ
01/17/2015; 12:00 pm, P12N		at No. 10 Arizona State	L 60–80	12–5 (4–2)	Wells Fargo Arena (1,510); Tucson, AZ
01/22/2015; 8:00 pm, P12N		No. 11 Oregon State	L 53–62	12–6 (4–3)	Jon M. Huntsman Center (1,761); Salt Lake City, UT
01/24/2015; 2:00 pm, P12N		Oregon	L 65–77	12–7 (4–4)	Jon M. Huntsman Center (864); Salt Lake City, UT
01/29/2015; 7:00 pm, P12N		USC	L 59–70	12–8 (4–5)	Jon M. Huntsman Center (1,621); Salt Lake City, UT
01/31/2015; 2:00 pm		No. 15 UCLA	L 63–69	12–9 (4–6)	Jon M. Huntsman Center (957); Salt Lake City, UT
02/04/2015; 6:00 pm, P12N		Colorado	W 71–55	13–9 (5–6)	Jon M. Huntsman Center (1,054); Salt Lake City, UT
02/07/2015; 12:00 pm, P12N		at Colorado	W 76–68	14–9 (6–6)	Coors Events Center (1,785); Boulder, CO
02/12/2015; 7:00 pm		at Oregon	L 58–69	14–10 (6–7)	Matthew Knight Arena (1,889); Eugene, OR
02/14/2015; 2:00 pm		at No. 8 Oregon State	L 53–72	14–11 (6–8)	Gill Coliseum (4,278); Corvallis, OR
02/19/2015; 6:00 pm, P12N		California	W 72–66	15–11 (7–8)	Jon M. Huntsman Center (1,713); Salt Lake City, UT
02/21/2015; 2:00 pm, P12N		No. 15 Stanford	L 54–72	15–12 (7–9)	Jon M. Huntsman Center (983); Salt Lake City, UT
02/25/2015; 8:00 pm		at Washington	L 60–73	15–13 (7–10)	Alaska Airlines Arena (1,733); Seattle, WA
02/27/2015; 12:00 pm, P12N		at Washington State	W 75–69	16–13 (8–10)	Beasley Coliseum (788); Pullman, WA
Pac-12 Women's Tournament
03/03/2016; 12:30 pm, P12N	(7)	vs. (10) California; First Round	L 63–66 ^{OT}	16–14	KeyArena; Seattle, WA
WNIT
03/18/2016*; 7:00 pm		Montana State; First Round	W 95–61	17–14	Jon M. Huntsman Center (1,239); Salt Lake City, UT
03/21/2016*; 7:00 pm, TheW.tv		at Gonzaga; Second Round	W 92–77	18–14	McCarthey Athletic Center (3,000); Spokane, WA
03/23/2016*; 7:00 pm		at Oregon; Third Round	L 63–73	18–15	Matthew Knight Arena (1,165); Eugene, OR
*Non-conference game. ^{#}Rankings from AP Poll/Coaches' Poll. (#) Tournament seedings in parentheses. All times are in Mountain Time.

== Rankings ==
Regular season polls
Poll	Pre- season	Week 2	Week 3	Week 4	Week 5	Week 6	Week 7	Week 8	Week 9	Week 10	Week 11	Week 12	Week 13	Week 14	Week 15	Week 16	Week 17	Week 18	Week 19	Final
AP	NR	NR	NR	NR	NR	NR	NR	NR	NR	RV	NR	NR	NR	NR	NR	NR	NR	NR	NR	N/A
Coaches	NR	NR	NR	NR	NR	NR	NR	NR	NR	NR	NR	NR	NR	NR	NR	NR	NR	NR	NR	NR

Legend
	Increase in ranking
	Decrease in ranking
	Not ranked previous week
(RV)	Received votes

== See also ==
- 2015–16 Utah Utes men's basketball team
