= 2015–16 USC Trojans women's basketball team =

Intercollegiate basketball season

2015–16 USC Trojans women's basketball

Women of Troy Classic Champions
- Conference: Pac-12 Conference
- Record: 19–13 (6–12 Pac-12)
- Head coach: Cynthia Cooper-Dyke (3rd season)
- Assistant coaches: Beth Burns; Jualeah Woods; Taja Edwards
- Home arena: Galen Center

2015–16 Pac-12 Conference women's basketball standings
	Conf.				Overall
Team	W		L	PCT	W		L	PCT
No. 6 Oregon State †	16	–	2	.889	32	–	5	.865
No. 11 Arizona State	16	–	2	.889	26	–	7	.788
No. 13 Stanford	14	–	4	.778	27	–	8	.771
No. 10 UCLA	14	–	4	.778	26	–	9	.743
Washington	11	–	7	.611	26	–	11	.703
Oregon	9	–	9	.500	24	–	11	.686
Utah	8	–	10	.444	18	–	15	.545
USC	6	–	12	.333	19	–	13	.594
Washington State	5	–	13	.278	14	–	16	.467
California	4	–	14	.222	15	–	17	.469
Arizona	3	–	15	.167	13	–	19	.406
Colorado	2	–	16	.111	7	–	23	.233
† 2016 Pac-12 Tournament winner As of April 3, 2016; Rankings from AP Poll

The 2015–16 USC Trojans women's basketball team represented University of Southern California during the 2015–16 NCAA Division I women's basketball season. The Trojans, led by third year head coach Cynthia Cooper-Dyke, played their home games at the Galen Center and were members of the Pac-12 Conference. They finished the season 19–13, 6–12 in Pac-12 play to finish in eighth place. They advanced to the quarterfinals of the Pac-12 women's basketball tournament where they lost to Oregon State.

== Roster ==
2015–16 USC Trojans women's basketball team
Players
Coaches

Pos.	#	Name	Height	Year	Previous school	Hometown
G	1	Jordan Adams	6 ft 1 in (1.85 m)	RS Jr	Mater Dei HS	Irvine, CA
G	2	Khaedin Taito	5 ft 11 in (1.8 m)	Fr	Palm Beach Currumbin HS	Hastings, NZ
G	10	Courtney Jaco	5 ft 8 in (1.73 m)	Jr	Windward School	Compton, CA
F	13	Marguerite Effa	6 ft 3 in (1.91 m)	Fr	Fairfax	Los Angeles, CA
G	14	Sadie Edwards	5 ft 10 in (1.78 m)	So	Blair Academy; Connecticut	Meriden, CT
G	21	Aliyah Mazyck	5 ft 9 in (1.75 m)	Fr	Myers Park HS	Charlotte, NC
G	23	Brianna Barrett	5 ft 7 in (1.7 m)	Sr	Oaks Christian School	Winnetka, CA
F	25	Alexis Lloyd	5 ft 10 in (1.78 m)	RS Jr	Whitney Young HS; Virginia Tech	Chicago, IL
G	30	Candela Abejon	6 ft 1 in (1.85 m)	Fr	Univ. de Ovideo	Asturias, Spain
F	32	Dani Milisic	6 ft 3 in (1.91 m)	Fr	Blacktown Girls HS	Sydney, Australia
F	35	Kristen Simon	6 ft 1 in (1.85 m)	So	Windward School	Gardena, CA
F	41	Temi Fagbenle	6 ft 4 in (1.93 m)	RS Sr	Blair Academy; Harvard	London, England

Head coach

Cynthia Cooper-Dyke (USC)

Assistant coach(es)

Beth Burns (Ohio State)
Jualeah Woods (USC)
Taja Edwards (Fresno State)

Legend

- (C) Team captain
- (S) Suspended
- (I) Ineligible
- (W) Walk-on
- Injured
- Current redshirt

Roster

== Schedule ==
Date time, TV	Rank^{#}	Opponent^{#}	Result	Record	Site (attendance) city, state
Exhibition
11/08/2015*; 2:00 pm		Cal State San Marcos	W 89–25		Galen Center; Los Angeles, CA
Non-conference regular season
11/13/2015*; 12:00 pm		Hope International	W 92–43	1–0	Galen Center (402); Los Angeles, CA
11/16/2015*; 4:00 pm		Santa Clara	W 81–46	2–0	Galen Center (302); Los Angeles, CA
11/22/2015*; 4:00 pm		vs. Grand Canyon; Hall of Fame Women's Challenge	W 75–44	3–0	McCarthey Athletic Center (5,509); Spokane, WA
11/23/2015*; 8:00 pm		vs. West Virginia; Hall of Fame Women's Challenge	W 78–67 ^{OT}	4–0	McCarthey Athletic Center (5,222); Spokane, WA
11/24/2015*; 6:00 pm		at Gonzaga; Hall of Fame Women's Challenge	W 60–56	5–0	McCarthey Athletic Center (5,154); Spokane, WA
11/29/2015*; 9:00 am, ESPN3		vs. Iona; Hall of Fame Women's Challenge	W 76–56	6–0	Mohegan Sun Arena (452); Uncasville, CT
12/04/2015*; 4:00 pm		Southern Utah	W 71–32	7–0	Lyon Center (492); Los Angeles, CA
12/06/2015*; 2:00 pm		UNLV	W 73–42	8–0	Galen Center (824); Los Angeles, CA
12/13/2015*; 4:00 pm		Long Beach State	W 69–43	9–0	Galen Center (621); Los Angeles, CA
12/18/2015*; 6:00 pm		Florida A&M; Women of Troy Classic semifinals	W 88–45	10–0	Galen Center (425); Los Angeles, CA
12/20/2015*; 3:00 pm		Albany; Women of Troy Classic championship	W 68–67	11–0	Galen Center (977); Los Angeles, CA
12/28/2015*; 7:00 pm		UC Irvine	W 75–56	12–0	Galen Center (406); Los Angeles, CA
Pac-12 regular season
12/30/2015; 7:00 pm, P12N		at No. 21 UCLA; Rivalry	L 73–78	12–1 (0–1)	Pauley Pavilion (2,766); Los Angeles, CA
01/02/2016; 6:00 pm, P12N		No. 10 Oregon State	L 49–57	12–2 (0–2)	Galen Center (498); Los Angeles, CA
01/04/2016; 5:00 pm, P12N		Oregon	W 75–67	13–2 (1–2)	Galen Center (565); Los Angeles, CA
01/10/2016; 6:00 pm, P12N		No. 15 UCLA; Rivalry	W 71–68	14–2 (2–2)	Galen Center (2,214); Los Angeles, CA
01/15/2016; 8:00 pm, P12N	No. 25	at Washington State	L 61–73	14–3 (2–3)	Beasley Coliseum (772); Pullman, WA
01/17/2016; 2:00 pm, P12N	No. 25	at Washington	L 60–69	14–4 (2–4)	Alaska Airlines Arena (1,790); Seattle, WA
01/22/2016; 8:00 pm, P12N		No. 12 Stanford	L 47–57	14–5 (2–5)	Galen Center (612); Los Angeles, CA
01/24/2016; 2:00 pm, P12N		California	W 61–47	15–5 (3–5)	Galen Center (1,476); Los Angeles, CA
01/29/2016; 6:00 pm, P12N		at Utah	W 70–59	16–5 (4–5)	Jon M. Huntsman Center (1,621); Salt Lake City, UT
01/31/2016; 6:00 pm, P12N		at Colorado	L 63–66	16–6 (4–6)	Coors Events Center (1,583); Boulder, CO
02/05/2016; 6:00 pm, P12N		at Arizona	W 67–57	17–6 (5–6)	McKale Center (1,030); Tucson, AZ
02/07/2016; 1:00 pm		at No. 9 Arizona State	L 68–69	17–7 (5–7)	Wells Fargo Arena (1,564); Tempe, AZ
02/12/2016; 7:00 pm		Washington	L 53–61	17–8 (5–8)	Galen Center (565); Los Angeles, CA
02/14/2016; 4:00 pm, P12N		Washington State	W 64–62	18–8 (6–8)	Galen Center (790); Los Angeles, CA
02/19/2016; 8:00 pm, P12N		at Oregon State	L 52–76	18–9 (6–9)	Gill Coliseum (3,615); Corvallis, OR
02/21/2016; 2:00 pm		at Oregon	L 60–69	18–10 (6–10)	Matthew Knight Arena (2,425); Eugene, OR
02/26/2016; 6:00 pm, P12N		No. 9 Arizona State	L 45–50	18–11 (6–11)	Galen Center (486); Los Angeles, CA
02/28/2016; 2:00 pm		Arizona	L 56–63	18–12 (6–12)	Galen Center (3,433); Los Angeles, CA
Pac-12 Conference Women's Tournament
03/03/2016; 6:00 pm, P12N	(8)	vs. (9) Washington State; First Round	W 77–73	19–12	KeyArena; Seattle, WA
03/04/2016; 6:00 pm, P12N	(8)	vs. (1) No. 8 Oregon State; Quarterfinals	L 53–63	19–13	KeyArena; Seattle, WA
*Non-conference game. ^{#}Rankings from AP Poll. (#) Tournament seedings in parentheses. All times are in Pacific Time.

== Rankings ==
Regular season polls
Poll	Pre- season	Week 2	Week 3	Week 4	Week 5	Week 6	Week 7	Week 8	Week 9	Week 10	Week 11	Week 12	Week 13	Week 14	Week 15	Week 16	Week 17	Week 18	Week 19	Final
AP	NR	NR	NR	RV	RV	RV	RV	RV	RV	25	RV	NR	NR	NR	NR	NR	NR	NR	NR	N/A
Coaches	NR	NR	NR	NR	NR	RV	RV	RV	NR	RV	NR	NR	NR	NR	NR	NR	NR	NR	NR	NR

Legend
	Increase in ranking
	Decrease in ranking
	Not ranked previous week
(RV)	Received Votes

== See also ==
2015–16 USC Trojans men's basketball team
