= 2015–16 Arizona State Sun Devils women's basketball team =

Intercollegiate basketball season

2015–16 Arizona State Sun Devils women's basketball

Pac-12 Regular Season Co-Champions

NCAA Women's Tournament, second round
- Conference: Pac-12 Conference

Ranking
- Coaches: No. 16
- AP: No. 11
- Record: 26–7 (16–2 Pac-12)
- Head coach: Charli Turner Thorne (19th season)
- Assistant coaches: Amanda Levens; Meg Sanders; Jackie Moore
- Home arena: Wells Fargo Arena

2015–16 Pac-12 Conference women's basketball standings
	Conf.				Overall
Team	W		L	PCT	W		L	PCT
No. 6 Oregon State †	16	–	2	.889	32	–	5	.865
No. 11 Arizona State	16	–	2	.889	26	–	7	.788
No. 13 Stanford	14	–	4	.778	27	–	8	.771
No. 10 UCLA	14	–	4	.778	26	–	9	.743
Washington	11	–	7	.611	26	–	11	.703
Oregon	9	–	9	.500	24	–	11	.686
Utah	8	–	10	.444	18	–	15	.545
USC	6	–	12	.333	19	–	13	.594
Washington State	5	–	13	.278	14	–	16	.467
California	4	–	14	.222	15	–	17	.469
Arizona	3	–	15	.167	13	–	19	.406
Colorado	2	–	16	.111	7	–	23	.233
† 2016 Pac-12 Tournament winner As of April 3, 2016; Rankings from AP Poll

The 2015–16 Arizona State Sun Devils women's basketball team represented Arizona State University during the 2015–16 NCAA Division I women's basketball season. The Sun Devils, led by nineteenth-year head coach Charli Turner Thorne, played their games at the Wells Fargo Arena and were members of the Pac-12 Conference. They finished the season 26–7, 16–2 in Pac-12 play to share the Pac-12 regular season title with Oregon State. They lost in the quarterfinals of the Pac-12 women's tournament to California. They received an at-large bid to the NCAA women's tournament, where they defeated New Mexico State in the first round before getting upset by Tennessee in the second round.

== Roster ==
2015–16 Arizona State Sun Devils women's basketball team
Players
Coaches

Pos.	#	Name	Height	Year	Previous school	Hometown
G	0	Katie Hempen	5 ft 9 in (1.75 m)	RS Sr	Highland/SIU Edwardsville	Highland, IL
G	1	Arnecia Hawkins	5 ft 10 in (1.78 m)	Sr	Mountain View	Mesa, AZ
G	2	Qiana Levy (W)	5 ft 6 in (1.68 m)	Jr	Monterey Trail	Sacramento, CA
G	3	Sabrina Haines	5 ft 10 in (1.78 m)	Fr	Desert Vista	Phoenix, AZ
G	5	Tia Kanoa	5 ft 8 in (1.73 m)	So	Kamehameha	Honolulu, HI
G	11	Peace Amukamara	5 ft 7 in (1.7 m)	Sr	Mesa CC/Millennium	Goodyear, AZ
F	21	Sophie Brunner	6 ft 1 in (1.85 m)	Jr	Aquin	Freeport, IL
C	22	Quinn Dornstauder	6 ft 4 in (1.93 m)	Jr	LeBoldus	Regina, SK
G	23	Elisha Davis	5 ft 3 in (1.6 m)	Sr	Berkeley	Oakland, CA
F	24	Kelsey Moos	6 ft 0 in (1.83 m)	Jr	Reardan	Edwall, WA
C	33	Charnea Johnson-Chapman	6 ft 3 in (1.91 m)	Fr	Canyon Springs	Moreno Valley, CA
F	42	Kianna Ibis	6 ft 1 in (1.85 m)	Fr	Benson	Omaha, NE
G	43	Eliza Normen	6 ft 0 in (1.83 m)	RS Sr	Monarch	Louisville, CO
G	50	Armani Hawkins	5 ft 10 in (1.78 m)	Fr	Mountain View	Mesa, AZ

Head coach

Charli Turner Thorne (Stanford)

Assistant coach(es)

Amanda Levens (Arizona State)
Meg Sanders (Fresno State)
Jackie Moore (Armstrong State)

Legend

- (C) Team captain
- (S) Suspended
- (I) Ineligible
- (W) Walk-on
- Injured
- Current redshirt

Roster

== Schedule ==
Date time, TV	Rank^{#}	Opponent^{#}	Result	Record	Site (attendance) city, state
Non-conference regular season
11/15/2015*; 3:30 pm, P12N	No. 15	No. 18 Kentucky	L 64–68 ^{OT}	0–1	Wells Fargo Arena (4,543); Tempe, AZ
11/21/2015*; 12:00 pm	No. 18	at SMU	W 64–57	1–1	Moody Coliseum (302); Dallas, TX
11/27/2015*; 5:30 pm	No. 16	vs. No. 2 South Carolina; Rainbow Wahine Showdown	L 58–60	1–2	Stan Sheriff Center; Honolulu, HI
11/28/2015*; 7:00 pm	No. 16	at Hawaiʻi; Rainbow Wahine Showdown	W 75–49	2–2	Stan Sheriff Center (2,152); Honolulu, HI
11/29/2015*; 5:30 pm	No. 16	vs. Cal State Bakersfield; Rainbow Wahine Showdown	W 60–47	3–2	Stan Sheriff Center; Honolulu, HI
12/05/2015*; 2:00 pm	No. 17	VCU; ASU Classic semifinals	L 48–57	3–3	Wells Fargo Arena (1,430); Tempe, AZ
12/06/2015*; 12:00 pm	No. 17	Columbia; ASU Classic 3rd place game	W 70–49	4–3	Wells Fargo Arena (1,283); Tempe, AZ
12/12/2015*; 11:00 am	No. 24	at No. 19 Syracuse	W 61–54	5–3	Carrier Dome (526); Syracuse, NY
12/14/2015*; 4:00 pm	No. 21	at Hartford	W 60–29	6–3	Chase Arena at Reich Family Pavilion (1,822); Hartford, CT
12/19/2015*; 3:00 pm	No. 21	Marquette	W 90–80	7–3	Wells Fargo Arena (1,439); Tempe, AZ
12/21/2015*; 3:00 pm, ESPNU	No. 22	No. 10 Florida State	W 68–56	8–3	Wells Fargo Arena (1,783); Tempe, AZ
12/28/2015*; 3:00 pm	No. 17	Cal State Northridge	W 69–46	9–3	Wells Fargo Arena (1,460); Tempe, AZ
Pac-12 regular season
01/02/2016; 5:00 pm, P12N	No. 17	No. 19 California	W 57–49	10–3 (1–0)	Wells Fargo Arena (1,460); Tempe, AZ
01/04/2016; 6:00 pm, P12N	No. 14	No. 9 Stanford	W 49–31	11–3 (2–0)	Wells Fargo Arena (1,708); Tempe, AZ
01/08/2016; 8:00 pm, P12N	No. 14	at Washington	W 68–61	12–3 (3–0)	Alaska Airlines Arena (1,767); Seattle, WA
01/10/2016; 1:00 pm, P12N	No. 14	at Washington State	W 63–45	13–3 (4–0)	Beasley Coliseum (713); Pullman, WA
01/15/2016; 11:00 am	No. 10	Colorado	W 64–37	14–3 (5–0)	Wells Fargo Arena (4,139); Tempe, AZ
01/17/2016; 12:00 pm, P12N	No. 10	Utah	W 80–60	15–3 (6–0)	Wells Fargo Arena (1,510); Tempe, AZ
01/22/2016; 7:00 pm, P12N	No. 8	Arizona; State Farm Territorial Cup Series	W 61–48	16–3 (7–0)	Wells Fargo Arena (3,455); Tempe, AZ
01/24/2016; 5:00 pm, P12N	No. 8	at Arizona; State Farm Territorial Cup Series	W 62–47	17–3 (8–0)	McKale Center (1,483); Tucson, AZ
01/29/2016; 9:00 pm, P12N	No. 8	at Oregon	W 63–58	18–3 (9–0)	Matthew Knight Arena (1,988); Eugene, OR
02/01/2016; 9:00 pm, ESPN2	No. 8	at No. 9 Oregon State	L 44–67	18–4 (9–1)	Gill Coliseum (4,427); Corvallis, OR
02/05/2016; 6:00 pm, P12N	No. 8	No. 14 UCLA	W 65–61	19–4 (10–1)	Wells Fargo Arena (3,095); Tempe, AZ
02/07/2016; 2:00 pm, P12N	No. 8	USC	W 69–68	20–4 (11–1)	Wells Fargo Arena (1,564); Tempe, AZ
02/12/2016; 8:00 pm	No. 9	at California	W 64–49	21–4 (12–1)	Haas Pavilion (1,417); Berkeley, CA
02/14/2016; 7:00 pm, P12N	No. 9	at No. 13 Stanford	W 63–61 ^{OT}	22–4 (13–1)	Maples Pavilion (3,250); Stanford, CA
02/19/2016; 6:00 pm, P12N	No. 9	Washington State	W 61–39	23–4 (14–1)	Wells Fargo Arena (2,851); Tempe, AZ
02/21/2016; 12:00 pm, P12N	No. 9	Washington	W 77–57	24–4 (15–1)	Wells Fargo Arena (3,244); Tempe, AZ
02/26/2016; 7:00 pm, P12N	No. 9	at USC	W 50–45	25–4 (16–1)	Galen Center (486); Los Angeles, CA
02/28/2016; 12:00 pm, P12N	No. 9	at No. 14 UCLA	L 61–74	25–5 (16–2)	Pauley Pavilion (6,972); Los Angeles, CA
Pac-12 Women's Tournament
03/04/2016; 12:30 pm, P12N	(2) No. 10	vs. (10) California; Quarterfinals	L 64–75	25–6	KeyArena (3,747); Seattle, WA
NCAA Women's Tournament
03/18/2016*; 4:30 pm, ESPN2	(2 SF) No. 11	(15 SF) New Mexico State; First Round	W 74–52	26–6	Wells Fargo Arena (3,134); Tempe, AZ
03/20/2016*; 6:00 pm, ESPN	(2 SF) No. 11	(7 SF) Tennessee; Second Round	L 64–75	26–7	Wells Fargo Arena (2,957); Tempe, AZ
*Non-conference game. ^{#}Rankings from AP Poll. (#) Tournament seedings in parentheses. SF=Sioux Falls Region. All times are in Mountain Time.

== Rankings ==
Regular season polls
Poll	Pre- season	Week 2	Week 3	Week 4	Week 5	Week 6	Week 7	Week 8	Week 9	Week 10	Week 11	Week 12	Week 13	Week 14	Week 15	Week 16	Week 17	Week 18	Week 19	Final
AP	15	18	16т	17	24	21т	22	17	14	10	8	8	8	9	9	9	10	11	11	N/A
Coaches	15	18	18	17	24	23	21	21	14	13	11	9	10	10	10	9	11	11	11	16

Legend
	Increase in ranking
	Decrease in ranking
	Not ranked previous week
(RV)	Received votes

== See also ==
- 2015–16 Arizona State Sun Devils men's basketball team
