= 2016 Pac-12 Conference women's basketball tournament =

- Classification: Division I
- Season: 2015–16
- Teams: 12
- Site: KeyArena; Seattle, WA
- Champions: Oregon State (1st title)
- Winning coach: Scott Rueck (1st title)
- MVP: Jamie Weisner (Oregon State)
- Attendance: 27,577
- Television: Pac-12 Network, ESPN

2015–16 Pac-12 Conference women's basketball standings
	Conf.				Overall
Team	W		L	PCT	W		L	PCT
No. 6 Oregon State †	16	–	2	.889	32	–	5	.865
No. 11 Arizona State	16	–	2	.889	26	–	7	.788
No. 13 Stanford	14	–	4	.778	27	–	8	.771
No. 10 UCLA	14	–	4	.778	26	–	9	.743
Washington	11	–	7	.611	26	–	11	.703
Oregon	9	–	9	.500	24	–	11	.686
Utah	8	–	10	.444	18	–	15	.545
USC	6	–	12	.333	19	–	13	.594
Washington State	5	–	13	.278	14	–	16	.467
California	4	–	14	.222	15	–	17	.469
Arizona	3	–	15	.167	13	–	19	.406
Colorado	2	–	16	.111	7	–	23	.233
† 2016 Pac-12 Tournament winner As of April 3, 2016; Rankings from AP Poll

The 2016 Pac-12 Conference women's basketball tournament was the postseason women's basketball tournament at KeyArena in Seattle, Washington from March 3–6, 2016. Oregon State defeated UCLA in the championship game to win their first Pac-12 Women's Tournament title in school history. With that win Oregon State received an automatic bid to the NCAA women's tournament.

== Seeds ==
Teams were seeded by conference record, with ties broken in the following order:

- Record between the tied teams
- Record against the highest-seeded team not involved in the tie, going down through the seedings as necessary
- Higher RPI

Seed	School	Conf (Overall)	Tiebreaker
#1	Oregon State	16–2 (25–4)	1–0 vs. ASU
#2	Arizona State	16–2 (25–5)	0–1 vs. OSU
#3	UCLA	14–4 (22–7)	1–0 vs. STAN
#4	Stanford	14–4 (24–6)	0–1 vs. UCLA
#5	Washington	11–7 (20–9)	
#6	Oregon	9–9 (20–9)	
#7	Utah	8–10 (16–13)	
#8	USC	6–12 (18–12)	
#9	Washington State	5–13 (14–15)	
#10	California	4–14 (13–16)	
#11	Arizona	3–15 (12–18)	
#12	Colorado	2–16 (7–22)	

== Schedule ==
Thursday-Sunday, March 3–6, 2016

The top four seeds received a first-round bye.

Session	Game	Time*	Matchup^{#}	Television	Attendance
First Round – Thursday, March 3
1	1	11:30 AM	#7 Utah vs. #10 California	Pac-12 Network	3,059
1	2	2:00 PM	#6 Oregon vs. #11 Arizona	Pac-12 Network	3,059
2	3	6:00 PM	#8 USC vs. #9 Washington State	Pac-12 Network	3,680
2	4	8:30 PM	#5 Washington vs. #12 Colorado	Pac-12 Network	3,680
Quarterfinals – Friday, March 4
3	5	11:30 AM	#2 Arizona State vs. #10 California	Pac-12 Network	3,747
3	5	2:00 PM	#3 UCLA vs. #11 Arizona	Pac-12 Network	3,747
4	7	6:00 PM	#1 Oregon State vs. #8 USC	Pac-12 Network	5,789
4	8	8:30 PM	#4 Stanford vs. #5 Washington	Pac-12 Network	5,789
Semifinals – Saturday, March 5
5	9	6:00 PM	#10 California vs. #3 UCLA	Pac-12 Network	6,543
5	10	8:30 PM	#1 Oregon State vs. #5 Washington	Pac-12 Network	6,543
Championship Game – Sunday, March 6
6	11	6:00 PM	#3 UCLA vs. #1 Oregon State	ESPN	4,759
*Game Times in PT.

== Bracket ==
First round Thursday, March 2 P12N
8	USC	77
9	Washington State	73
5	Washington	67
12	Colorado	51
7	Utah	63
10	California	66^{OT}
6	Oregon	68
11	Arizona	74

Quarterfinals; Friday, March 3 P12N
1	#8 Oregon State	63
8	USC	53
4	#11 Stanford	65
5	Washington	73
2	#10 Arizona State	64
10	California	75
3	#12 UCLA	72
11	Arizona	51

Semifinals; Saturday, March 4 P12N
1	#8 Oregon State	57
5	Washington	55
10	California	67
3	#12 UCLA	73^{OT}

Championship Game; Sunday, March 5 ESPN
1	#8 Oregon State	69
3	#12 UCLA	57

=== All-Tournament Team ===
Name	Pos.	Year	Team
Kristine Anigwe	F	Fr.	California
Jordin Canada	G	So.	UCLA
Ruth Hamblin	C	Sr.	Oregon State
Kelsey Plum	G	Jr.	Washington
Jamie Weisner	G	Sr.	Oregon State
Sydney Wiese	G	Sr.	Oregon State

=== Most Outstanding Player ===
Name	Pos.	Year	Team
Jamie Weisner	G	Sr.	Oregon State

== See also ==
2016 Pac-12 Conference men's basketball tournament

== Notes ==
- March 4, 2016 – Head coach Niya Butts coached her last game for the University of Arizona
