= 2015–16 Colorado Buffaloes women's basketball team =

Intercollegiate basketball season

2015–16 Colorado Buffaloes women's basketball
- Conference: Pac-12 Conference
- Record: 7–23 (2–16 Pac-12)
- Head coach: Linda Lappe (6th season)
- Assistant coaches: Julian Assibey; Jamie Carey; Kelly Rae Finley
- Home arena: Coors Events Center

2015–16 Pac-12 Conference women's basketball standings
	Conf.				Overall
Team	W		L	PCT	W		L	PCT
No. 6 Oregon State †	16	–	2	.889	32	–	5	.865
No. 11 Arizona State	16	–	2	.889	26	–	7	.788
No. 13 Stanford	14	–	4	.778	27	–	8	.771
No. 10 UCLA	14	–	4	.778	26	–	9	.743
Washington	11	–	7	.611	26	–	11	.703
Oregon	9	–	9	.500	24	–	11	.686
Utah	8	–	10	.444	18	–	15	.545
USC	6	–	12	.333	19	–	13	.594
Washington State	5	–	13	.278	14	–	16	.467
California	4	–	14	.222	15	–	17	.469
Arizona	3	–	15	.167	13	–	19	.406
Colorado	2	–	16	.111	7	–	23	.233
† 2016 Pac-12 Tournament winner As of April 3, 2016; Rankings from AP Poll

The 2015–16 Colorado Buffaloes women's basketball team represented the University of Colorado Boulder during the 2015–16 NCAA Division I women's basketball season. The Buffaloes, led by six-year head coach Linda Lappe, play their home games at the Coors Events Center and are members of the Pac-12 Conference. They finished the season 7–23, 2–26 in Pac-12 play to finish in the last place. They lost in the first round of the Pac-12 women's basketball tournament to Washington.

On March 7, Linda Happe resigned. She finished with a six-year record at Colorado of 105–92.

== Roster ==
2015–16 Colorado Buffaloes women's basketball team
Players
Coaches

Pos.	#	Name	Height	Year	Previous school	Hometown
F	1	Makenzie Ellis	6 ft 2 in (1.88 m)	Fr	Booker T. Washington	Tulsa, OK
G	2	Alexis Robinson	5 ft 10 in (1.78 m)	Fr	Paul G. Blazer	Ashland, KY
C	3	Bri Watts	6 ft 2 in (1.88 m)	Jr	Clovis West	Fresno, CA
G	12	Ariana Freeman	5 ft 9 in (1.75 m)	So	Paul VI Catholic; Louisville	Manassas, VA
G	13	Brecca Thomas	5 ft 5 in (1.65 m)	So	The Kinkaid School	Stafford, TX
G	14	Kennedy Leonard	5 ft 8 in (1.73 m)	Fr	Carroll	Southlake, TX
C	15	Zoe Correal	6 ft 4 in (1.93 m)	So	Salesian	San Francisco, CA
F	21	Monica Burich	6 ft 2 in (1.88 m)	Fr	Roseville	Roseville, MN
G/F	22	Haley Smith	6 ft 1 in (1.85 m)	Jr	Skyline	Sammamish, WA
G/F	24	Lauren Huggins	6 ft 2 in (1.88 m)	Jr	Heritage	Littleton, CO
F	31	Zoe Beard-Fails	6 ft 1 in (1.85 m)	Jr	Georgetown Day School	Herndon, VA
F	50	Jamee Swan	6 ft 2 in (1.88 m)	Sr	Marana	Marana, AZ

Head coach

- Linda Lappe (Colorado)

Assistant coach(es)

- Julian Assibey (William Penn)
- Jamie Carey (Texas)
- Kelly Rae Finley (Colorado State)

Legend

- (C) Team captain
- (S) Suspended
- (I) Ineligible
- (W) Walk-on
- Injured
- Current redshirt

Roster

== Schedule ==
Date time, TV	Rank^{#}	Opponent^{#}	Result	Record	Site (attendance) city, state
Exhibition
11/07/2015*; 7:00 pm		USC Aiken	W 86–46	–	Coors Events Center (363); Boulder, CO
Non-conference regular season
11/14/2015*; 2:00 pm		Loyola Marymount	W 92–81	1–0	Coors Events Center (2,432); Boulder, CO
11/19/2015*; 7:00 pm		Northern Colorado	W 63–41	2–0	Coors Events Center (1,597); Boulder, CO
11/22/2015*; 12:00 pm		at No. 13 Kentucky	L 61–86	2–1	Memorial Coliseum (5,380); Lexington, KY
11/27/2015*; 7:30 pm		Massachusetts; Omni Hotels Classic semifinals	W 90–63	3–1	Coors Events Center (1,611); Boulder, CO
11/28/2015*; 7:30 pm		Florida; Omni Hotels Classic championship	L 61–83	3–2	Coors Events Center (1,666); Boulder, CO
12/02/2015*; 7:00 pm		at Colorado State	L 63–64	3–3	Moby Arena (2,049); Fort Collins, CO
12/06/2015*; 3:00 pm		at Long Beach State	L 42–59	3–4	Walter Pyramid (692); Long Beach, CA
12/09/2015*; 7:00 pm		Northern Arizona	W 90–66	4–4	Coors Events Center (1,532); Boulder, CO
12/12/2015*; 1:30 pm, P12N		Missouri	L 75–79	4–5	Coors Events Center (1,828); Boulder, CO
12/19/2015*; 3:30 pm		Presbyterian	W 72–60	5–5	Coors Events Center (1,647); Boulder, CO
12/21/2015*; 7:00 pm		at Wyoming	L 68–77	5–6	Arena-Auditorium (2,539); Laramie, WY
Pac-12 regular season
01/02/2016; 1:00 pm, P12N		Washington	L 74–76	5–7 (0–1)	Coors Events Center (2,107); Boulder, CO
01/04/2016; 8:00 pm, P12N		Washington State	L 66–74	5–8 (0–2)	Coors Events Center (1,595); Boulder, CO
01/08/2016; 8:00 pm, P12N		at No. 21 California	L 35–64	5–9 (0–3)	Haas Pavilion (1,173); Berkeley, CA
01/10/2016; 1:00 pm, P12N		at No. 9 Stanford	L 56–71	5–10 (0–4)	Maples Pavilion (3,188); Stanford, CA
01/15/2016; 11:00 am		at Arizona State	L 37–64	5–11 (0–5)	Wells Fargo Arena (4,139); Tempe, AZ
01/15/2016; 2:00 pm, P12N		at Arizona	L 52–63	5–12 (0–6)	McKale Center (967); Tucson, AZ
01/22/2016; 6:00 pm, P12N		Oregon	L 46–59	5–13 (0–7)	Coors Events Center (3,818); Boulder, CO
01/24/2016; 3:00 pm, P12N		No. 11 Oregon State	L 47–61	5–14 (0–8)	Coors Events Center (1,711); Boulder, CO
01/29/2016; 7:00 pm		No. 15 UCLA	L 64–82	5–15 (0–9)	Coors Events Center (2,252); Boulder, CO
01/31/2016; 7:00 pm, P12N		USC	W 66–63	6–15 (1–9)	Coors Events Center (1,583); Boulder, CO
02/04/2016; 6:00 pm, P12N		at Utah	L 55–71	6–16 (1–10)	Jon M. Huntsman Center (1,054); Salt Lake City, UT
02/07/2016; 12:00 pm, P12N		Utah	L 68–76	6–17 (1–11)	Coors Events Center (1,785); Boulder, CO
02/12/2016; 8:30 pm, P12N		at No. 8 Oregon State	L 50–73	6–18 (1–12)	Gill Coliseum (3,677); Corvallis, OR
02/14/2016; 5:00 pm, P12N		at Oregon	L 70–77	6–19 (1–13)	Matthew Knight Arena (2,032); Eugene, OR
02/19/2016; 8:00 pm, P12N		No. 15 Stanford	L 49–80	6–20 (1–14)	Coors Events Center (2,312); Boulder, CO
02/21/2016; 12:00 pm, P12N		California	W 78–57	7–20 (2–14)	Coors Events Center (3,919); Boulder, CO
02/25/2016; 8:00 pm		at Washington State	L 70–83	7–21 (2–15)	Beasley Coliseum (718); Pullman, WA
02/27/2016; 2:00 pm, P12N		at Washington	L 47–68	7–22 (2–16)	Alaska Airlines Arena (2,376); Seattle, WA
Pac-12 Women's Tournament
03/03/2016; 9:30 pm, P12N	(12)	vs. (5) Washington; First Round	L 51–67	7–23	KeyArena (3,680); Seattle, WA
*Non-conference game. ^{#}Rankings from AP Poll. (#) Tournament seedings in parentheses. All times are in Mountain Time.

== Rankings ==
2015–16 NCAA Division I women's basketball rankings

Regular season polls
Poll	Pre- Season	Week 2	Week 3	Week 4	Week 5	Week 6	Week 7	Week 8	Week 9	Week 10	Week 11	Week 12	Week 13	Week 14	Week 15	Week 16	Week 17	Week 18	Final
AP																			
Coaches	NR																		

Legend
	Increase in ranking
	Decrease in ranking
	Not ranked previous week
(RV)	Received Votes

== See also ==
2015–16 Colorado Buffaloes men's basketball team
