= 2015–16 California Golden Bears women's basketball team =

Intercollegiate basketball season

2015–16 California Golden Bears women's basketball
- Conference: Pac-12 Conference
- Record: 15–17 (4–14 Pac-12)
- Head coach: Lindsay Gottlieb (5th season)
- Assistant coaches: Charmin Smith; Jeff Cammon; Kai Felton
- Home arena: Haas Pavilion

2015–16 Pac-12 Conference women's basketball standings
	Conf.				Overall
Team	W		L	PCT	W		L	PCT
No. 6 Oregon State †	16	–	2	.889	32	–	5	.865
No. 11 Arizona State	16	–	2	.889	26	–	7	.788
No. 13 Stanford	14	–	4	.778	27	–	8	.771
No. 10 UCLA	14	–	4	.778	26	–	9	.743
Washington	11	–	7	.611	26	–	11	.703
Oregon	9	–	9	.500	24	–	11	.686
Utah	8	–	10	.444	18	–	15	.545
USC	6	–	12	.333	19	–	13	.594
Washington State	5	–	13	.278	14	–	16	.467
California	4	–	14	.222	15	–	17	.469
Arizona	3	–	15	.167	13	–	19	.406
Colorado	2	–	16	.111	7	–	23	.233
† 2016 Pac-12 Tournament winner As of April 3, 2016; Rankings from AP Poll

The 2015–16 California Golden Bears women's basketball team represented University of California, Berkeley during the 2015–16 NCAA Division I women's basketball season. The Golden Bears, led by fifth-year head coach Lindsay Gottlieb, played their home games at the Haas Pavilion and were members of the Pac-12 Conference. They finished the season 15–17, 4–14 in Pac-12 play to finish in tenth place. They advanced to the semifinals of the Pac-12 women's basketball tournament, where they lost to UCLA. They missed the postseason for the first time since 2005.

== Roster ==
2015–16 California Golden Bears women's basketball team
Players
Coaches

Pos.	#	Name	Height	Year	Previous school	Hometown
G	1	Asha Thomas	5 ft 4 in (1.63 m)	Fr	Bishop O'Dowd	Oakland, CA
G	2	Breanna Cavanaugh	5 ft 8 in (1.73 m)	Fr	Blair Academy	Hackettstown, NJ
F	3	Mikayla Cowling	6 ft 2 in (1.88 m)	So	Saint Mary's College (HS)	Benicia, CA
C	5	Chen Yue	6 ft 7 in (2.01 m)	Fr	Tsinghua University	Beijing, China
F	12	Penina Davidson	6 ft 3 in (1.91 m)	So	Rangitoto College	Auckland, New Zealand
F	20	MeAne Mosley	5 ft 11 in (1.8 m)	Fr	Saint Mary's College (HS)	Oakland, CA
F	24	Courtney Range	5 ft 3 in (1.6 m)	Jr	Manteca	Manteca, CA
F	31	Kristine Anigwe	6 ft 4 in (1.93 m)	Fr	Desert Vista	Phoenix, AZ
G	33	Gabby Green	6 ft 2 in (1.88 m)	So	Saint Mary's College (HS)	Oakland, CA
F	44	KC Waters	6 ft 2 in (1.88 m)	Jr	Bishop O'Dowd	San Ramon, CA

Head coach

- Lindsay Gottlieb (Brown)

Assistant coach(es)

- Charmin Smith (Stanford)
- Jeff Cammon (Alcorn State)
- Kai Felton (Randolph–Macon)

Legend

- (C) Team captain
- (S) Suspended
- (I) Ineligible
- (W) Walk-on
- Injured
- Current redshirt

Roster
Last update: 2015-07-20

== Schedule ==
Date time, TV	Rank^{#}	Opponent^{#}	Result	Record	Site (attendance) city, state
Exhibition
November 8, 2015*; 2:00 pm		Westmont	W 91–39		Haas Pavilion; Berkeley, CA
Non-conference regular season
November 13, 2015*; 5:00 pm		at Austin Peay	W 67–58	1–0	Dunn Center (657); Clarksville, TN
November 15, 2015*; 11:00 am, ESPN3		at No. 8 Louisville	W 75–71	2–0	KFC Yum! Center (16,524); Louisville, KY
November 20, 2015*; 11:30 am	No. 21	UC Riverside	W 64–58	3–0	Haas Pavilion (3,556); Berkeley, CA
November 22, 2015*; 2:00 pm	No. 21	Cal Poly	W 82–57	4–0	Haas Pavilion; Berkeley, CA
November 27, 2015*; 12:00 pm	No. 16	vs. No. 10 Texas A&M; South Point Shootout	L 58–75	4–1	South Point Arena; Enterprise, NV
November 28, 2015*; 2:15 pm	No. 16	vs. Liberty; South Point Shootout	W 77–72	5–1	South Point Arena; Enterprise, NV
December 5, 2015*; 2:00 pm	No. 18	Saint Mary's; Cal Classic Semifinal	L 63–64	5–2	Haas Pavilion; Berkeley, CA
December 6, 2015*; 1:00 pm	No. 18	Sacramento State; Cal Classic 3rd place game	W 117–99	6–2	Haas Pavilion (612); Berkeley, CA
December 12, 2015*; 5:00 pm, P12N	No. 22	Nebraska	W 87–80 ^{OT}	7–2	Haas Pavilion (4,406); Berkeley, CA
December 21, 2015*; 6:00 pm, P12N	No. 21	No. 19 UCLA	W 108–104 ^{2OT}	8–2	Haas Pavilion (2,482); Berkeley, CA
December 30, 2015*; 7:00 pm	No. 19	Cal State Northridge	W 106–44	9–2	Haas Pavilion (1,683); Berkeley, CA
Pac-12 regular season
January 2, 2016; 4:00 pm, P12N	No. 19	at No. 17 Arizona State	L 49–57	9–3 (0–1)	Wells Fargo Arena (1,460); Tempe, AZ
January 4, 2016; 7:00 pm, P12N	No. 21	at Arizona	L 52–57	9–4 (0–2)	McKale Center (728); Tucson, AZ
January 8, 2016; 7:00 pm, P12N	No. 21	Colorado	W 64–35	10–4 (1–2)	Haas Pavilion (1,173); Berkeley, CA
January 10, 2016; 2:00 pm	No. 21	Utah	L 79–84	10–5 (1–3)	Haas Pavilion; Berkeley, CA
January 15, 2016; 8:00 pm, P12N		at No. 12 Oregon State	L 48–70	10–6 (1–4)	Gill Coliseum (2,891); Corvallis, OR
January 17, 2016; 2:00 pm		at Oregon	L 59–69	10–7 (1–5)	Matthew Knight Arena (1,770); Eugene, OR
January 22, 2016; 6:00 pm, P12N		at No. 20 UCLA	L 56–75	10–8 (1–6)	Pauley Pavilion (1,790); Los Angeles, CA
January 24, 2016; 2:00 pm, P12N		at USC	L 47–61	10–9 (1–7)	Galen Center (1,476); Los Angeles, CA
January 29, 2016; 6:00 pm, P12N		Washington State	W 74–71	11–9 (2–7)	Haas Pavilion (1,178); Berkeley, CA
January 31, 2016; 2:00 pm, P12N		No. 25 Washington	L 65–75	11–10 (2–8)	Haas Pavilion (2,132); Berkeley, CA
February 2, 2016; 7:00 pm, P12N		at No. 15 Stanford	L 46–53	11–11 (2–9)	Maples Pavilion (3,268); Stanford, CA
February 5, 2016; 7:00 pm, P12N		No. 15 Stanford	L 55–60	11–12 (2–10)	Haas Pavilion (5,632); Berkeley, CA
February 12, 2016; 7:00 pm		No. 9 Arizona State	L 49–64	11–13 (2–11)	Haas Pavilion (1,417); Berkeley, CA
February 14, 2016; 12:00 pm, P12N		Arizona	W 75–56	12–13 (3–11)	Haas Pavilion (1,311); Berkeley, CA
February 19, 2016; 5:00 pm, P12N		at Utah	L 66–72	12–14 (3–12)	Jon M. Huntsman Center (1,713); Salt Lake City, UT
February 21, 2016; 11:00 am, P12N		at Colorado	L 57–78	12–15 (3–13)	Coors Events Center (3,919); Boulder, CO
February 26, 2016; 7:00 pm		Oregon	W 65–54	13–15 (4–13)	Haas Pavilion (1,543); Berkeley, CA
February 28, 2016; 11:00 am, P12N		No. 7 Oregon State	L 44–54	13–16 (4–14)	Haas Pavilion (2,036); Berkeley, CA
Pac-12 Women's Tournament
March 3, 2016; 11:30 am, P12N	(10)	vs. (7) Utah; First Round	W 66–63 ^{OT}	14–16	KeyArena; Seattle, WA
March 4, 2016; 11:30 am, P12N	(10)	vs. (2) No. 10 Arizona State; Quarterfinals	W 75–64	15–16	KeyArena (3,747); Seattle, WA
March 5, 2016; 6:00 pm, P12N	(10)	vs. (3) No. 12 UCLA; Semifinals	L 67–73 ^{OT}	15–17	KeyArena; Seattle, WA
*Non-conference game. ^{#}Rankings from AP Poll. (#) Tournament seedings in parentheses. All times are in Pacific Time.

== Rankings ==
Regular season polls
Poll	Pre- season	Week 2	Week 3	Week 4	Week 5	Week 6	Week 7	Week 8	Week 9	Week 10	Week 11	Week 12	Week 13	Week 14	Week 15	Week 16	Week 17	Week 18	Week 19	Final
AP	RV	21	16т	18	22	21т	21	19	21	RV	RV	NR	NR	NR	NR	NR	NR	NR	NR	N/A
Coaches	RV	21	15	17	21	20	18	18	RV	RV	NR	NR	NR	NR	NR	NR	NR	NR	NR	NR

Legend
	Increase in ranking
	Decrease in ranking
	Not ranked previous week
(RV)	Received votes

== See also ==
- 2015–16 California Golden Bears men's basketball team
