= 2015–16 UCLA Bruins women's basketball team =

American college basketball season

2015–16 UCLA Bruins women's basketball

NCAA tournament, Sweet Sixteen
- Conference: Pac-12 Conference

Ranking
- Coaches: No. 13
- AP: No. 10
- Record: 26–9 (14–4 Pac-12)
- Head coach: Cori Close (5th season)
- Assistant coaches: Jenny Huth; Tony Newnan; Shannon Perry
- Home arena: Pauley Pavilion

2015–16 Pac-12 Conference women's basketball standings
	Conf.				Overall
Team	W		L	PCT	W		L	PCT
No. 6 Oregon State †	16	–	2	.889	32	–	5	.865
No. 11 Arizona State	16	–	2	.889	26	–	7	.788
No. 13 Stanford	14	–	4	.778	27	–	8	.771
No. 10 UCLA	14	–	4	.778	26	–	9	.743
Washington	11	–	7	.611	26	–	11	.703
Oregon	9	–	9	.500	24	–	11	.686
Utah	8	–	10	.444	18	–	15	.545
USC	6	–	12	.333	19	–	13	.594
Washington State	5	–	13	.278	14	–	16	.467
California	4	–	14	.222	15	–	17	.469
Arizona	3	–	15	.167	13	–	19	.406
Colorado	2	–	16	.111	7	–	23	.233
† 2016 Pac-12 Tournament winner As of April 3, 2016; Rankings from AP Poll

The 2015–16 UCLA Bruins women's basketball team represented the University of California, Los Angeles during the 2015–16 NCAA Division I women's basketball season. The Bruins, led by fifth-year head coach Cori Close, played their home games at the Pauley Pavilion and were members of the Pac-12 Conference. They finished the season 26–9, 14–4 in Pac-12 play to finish in a tie for third place. They advanced to the championship game of the Pac-12 women's tournament, where they lost to Oregon State. They earned an at-large bid to the NCAA women's tournament, where they defeated Hawaii in the first round and South Florida in the second round, before losing to Texas in the Sweet Sixteen.

== Offseason ==
=== Departures ===
Name	Pos.	Height	Year	Hometown	Reason for departure
Recee' Caldwell	G	5'8"	Fr.	San Antonio, Texas	Transferred to Texas Tech
Luiana Livulo	C	6'3"	Sr.	Lisbon, Portugal	Graduated
Madeline Poteet	G	5'8"	Sr.	Temecula, California	Graduated
Corinne Costa	F/C	6'4"	RS Sr.	Discovery Bay, California	Graduated
Savanna Trapp	C	6'9"	RS Fr.	Esko, Minnesota	Left team for personal reasons

=== Incoming transfers ===
Name	Pos.	Height	Year	Hometown	Previous school
Nicole Kornet	Guard	6'1"	Jr	Lantana, TX	Oklahoma

=== 2015 recruiting class ===
College recruiting
Name	Hometown	School	Height	Weight	Commit date
Kennedy Burke; W	Northridge, CA	Sierra Canyon	6 ft 0 in (1.83 m)	N/A	
Kennedy Burke; W	Recruit ratings: ESPN: (98)				
Ashley Hearn; F	Rowlett, TX	Sachse	6 ft 3 in (1.91 m)	N/A	
Ashley Hearn; F	Recruit ratings: ESPN: (97)				
Overall recruit ranking:
Note: In many cases, Scout, Rivals, 247Sports, On3, and ESPN may conflict in their listings of height and weight.; In these cases, the average was taken. ESPN grades are on a 100-point scale.; Sources:

== Roster ==
2015–16 UCLA Bruins women's basketball team
Players
Coaches

Pos.	#	Name	Height	Year	Previous school	Hometown
G	1	Nicole Kornet (redshirt)	6 ft 1 in (1.85 m)	Sr	Liberty Christian; Oklahoma	Lantana, TX
G	2	Kari Korver	5 ft 9 in (1.75 m)	RS Jr	Valley Christian	Paramount, CA
G	3	Jordin Canada	5 ft 6 in (1.68 m)	So	Windward	Los Angeles, CA
F	4	Ashley Hearn	6 ft 4 in (1.93 m)	Fr	Sachse	Rowlett, TX
F	10	Kacy Swain	6 ft 3 in (1.91 m)	RS Sr	St. Bernard's	Los Angeles, CA
F	11	Lajahna Drummer	6 ft 1 in (1.85 m)	So	Long Beach Poly HS	Inglewood, CA
G	20	Dominique Williams (injured) (redshirt)	5 ft 8 in (1.73 m)	Jr	Saint Mary's	Phoenix, AZ
G	21	Nirra Fields	5 ft 9 in (1.75 m)	Sr	Mater Dei	Montreal, QC
G	22	Kennedy Burke	6 ft 1 in (1.85 m)	Fr	Sierra Canyon School	Northridge, CA
G	23	Kelli Hayes	6 ft 0 in (1.83 m)	So	Archbishop Mitty	San Jose, CA
F	24	Paulina Hersler	6 ft 3 in (1.91 m)	RS So	Igelstavikens Gymnasium	Malmö, Sweden
F	25	Monique Billings	6 ft 4 in (1.93 m)	So	Santiago	Corona, CA
G	32	Chrissy Baird	6 ft 1 in (1.85 m)	So	Wheaton North	Wheaton, IL

Head coach

Cori Close (UC Santa Barbara)

Assistant coach(es)

Jenny Huth (Colorado)
Tony Newnan (UC Santa Barbara)
Shannon Perry (Iowa)

Legend

- (C) Team captain
- (S) Suspended
- (I) Ineligible
- (W) Walk-on
- Injured
- Current redshirt

Roster

== Rankings ==
Regular season polls
Poll	Pre- season	Week 2	Week 3	Week 4	Week 5	Week 6	Week 7	Week 8	Week 9	Week 10	Week 11	Week 12	Week 13	Week 14	Week 15	Week 16	Week 17	Week 18	Week 19	Final
AP	RV	RV	RV	24т	20	19	19	21	15	17	20	15	14	14	12т	14	12	10	10	N/A
Coaches	RV	RV	RV	RV	RV	RV	RV	RV	21	23	25	19	16	16	14	15	14	12	12	13

Legend
	Increase in ranking
	Decrease in ranking
	Not ranked previous week
(RV)	Received votes

== Schedule ==
Date time, TV	Rank^{#}	Opponent^{#}	Result	Record	Site (attendance) city, state
Exhibition
11/01/2015*; 2:00 pm		Vanguard	W 113–42		Pauley Pavilion (1,206); Los Angeles, CA
Non-conference regular season
11/13/2015*; 5:00 pm		St. John's	W 73–58	1–0	Pauley Pavilion (6,674); Los Angeles, CA
11/20/2015*; 7:00 pm		James Madison	W 90–61	2–0	Pauley Pavilion (840); Los Angeles, CA
11/22/2015*; 1:00 pm, P12N		No. 2 South Carolina	L 65–68	2–1	Pauley Pavilion (2,018); Los Angeles, CA
11/27/2015*; 10:00 am		vs. Louisiana Tech; Junkanoo Jam semifinals	W 68–57	3–1	St. George HS Gymnasium (763); Freeport, BAH
11/28/2015*; 12:15 pm		vs. No. 3 Notre Dame; Junkanoo Jam championship	L 84–92 ^{OT}	3–2	St. George HS Gymnasium (683); Freeport, BAH
12/05/2015*; 2:00 pm	No. 24	Cal State Bakersfield	W 82–68	4–2	Pauley Pavilion (795); Los Angeles, CA
12/13/2015*; 11:00 am, BTN	No. 20	at Michigan	W 86–77	5–2	Crisler Arena (2,834); Ann Arbor, MI
12/16/2015*; 7:00 pm	No. 19	UC Irvine	W 83–49	6–2	Pauley Pavilion (563); Los Angeles, CA
12/18/2015*; 7:05 pm	No. 19	at Sacramento State	W 109–76	7–2	Hornets Nest (688); Sacramento, CA
12/21/2015*; 6:00 pm, P12N	No. 19	at No. 21 California	L 104–108 ^{2OT}	7–3	Haas Pavilion (2,482); Berkeley, CA
12/28/2015*; 7:00 pm	No. 21	at UC Riverside	W 70–56	8–3	Student Recreation Center Arena (667); Riverside, CA
Pac-12 regular season
12/30/2015; 7:00 pm, P12N	No. 21	USC; Rivalry	W 78–73	9–3 (1–0)	Pauley Pavilion (2,766); Los Angeles, CA
01/02/2016; 2:00 pm, P12N	No. 21	Oregon	W 80–69	10–3 (2–0)	Pauley Pavilion (1,443); Los Angeles, CA
01/04/2016; 7:00 pm, P12N	No. 15	No. 11 Oregon State	W 71–51	11–3 (3–0)	Pauley Pavilion (1,161); Los Angeles, CA
01/10/2016; 6:00 pm, P12N	No. 15	at USC; Rivalry	L 68–71	11–4 (3–1)	Galen Center (2,214); Los Angeles, CA
01/15/2016; 6:00 pm, P12N	No. 17	at Washington	L 56–64	11–5 (3–2)	Alaska Airlines Arena (1,547); Seattle, WA
01/17/2016; 12:00 pm, P12N	No. 17	at Washington State	W 75–73	12–5 (4–2)	Beasley Coliseum (568); Pullman, WA
01/22/2016; 6:00 pm, P12N	No. 20	California	W 75–56	13–5 (5–2)	Pauley Pavilion (1,790); Los Angeles, CA
01/24/2016; 6:00 pm, P12N	No. 20	No. 12 Stanford	W 56–36	14–5 (6–2)	Pauley Pavilion (3,061); Los Angeles, CA
01/29/2016; 6:00 pm	No. 15	at Colorado	W 82–64	15–5 (7–2)	Coors Events Center (2,252); Boulder, CO
01/31/2016; 1:00 pm	No. 15	at Utah	W 69–63	16–5 (8–2)	Jon M. Huntsman Center (957); Salt Lake City, UT
02/05/2016; 5:00 pm, P12N	No. 14	at No. 8 Arizona State	L 61–65	16–6 (8–3)	Wells Fargo Arena (3,095); Tempe, AZ
02/07/2016; 12:00 pm	No. 14	at Arizona	W 73–39	17–6 (9–3)	McKale Center (843); Tucson, AZ
02/12/2016; 7:00 pm	No. 14	Washington State	W 73–61	18–6 (10–3)	Pauley Pavilion (1,660); Los Angeles, CA
02/14/2016; 11:00 am, ESPNU	No. 14	Washington	W 63–59	19–6 (11–3)	Pauley Pavilion (1,609); Los Angeles, CA
02/19/2016; 6:00 pm, P12N	No. 12	at Oregon	W 77–72	20–6 (12–3)	Matthew Knight Arena (2,166); Eugene, OR
02/21/2016; 6:00 pm, P12N	No. 12	at No. 7 Oregon State	L 54–64	20–7 (12–4)	Gill Coliseum (5,654); Corvallis, OR
02/26/2016; 8:00 pm	No. 14	Arizona	W 80–53	21–7 (13–4)	Pauley Pavilion (1,641); Los Angeles, CA
02/28/2016; 11:00 am, P12N	No. 14	No. 9 Arizona State	W 74–61	22–7 (14–4)	Pauley Pavilion (6,972); Los Angeles, CA
Pac-12 Women's Tournament
03/04/2016; 2:00 pm, P12N	(3) No. 12	vs. (11) Arizona; Quarterfinals	W 72–51	23–7	KeyArena (3,747); Seattle, WA
03/05/2016; 6:00 pm, P12N	(3) No. 12	vs. (10) California; Semifinals	W 73–67 ^{OT}	24–7	KeyArena; Seattle, WA
03/06/2016; 6:00 pm, ESPN	(3) No. 12	vs. (1) No. 8 Oregon State; Championship Game	L 57–69	24–8	KeyArena (4,759); Seattle, WA
NCAA Women's Tournament
03/19/2016*; 3:30 pm, ESPN2	(3 B) No. 10	(14 B) Hawaii; First Round	W 66–50	25–8	Pauley Pavilion (2,552); Los Angeles, CA
03/21/2016*; 6:00 pm, ESPN2	(3 B) No. 10	(6 B) No. 21 South Florida; Second Round	W 72–67	26–8	Pauley Pavilion (1,656); Los Angeles, CA
03/26/2016*; 10:30 am, ESPN	(3 B) No. 10	vs. (2 B) No. 7 Texas; Sweet Sixteen	L 64–72	26–9	Webster Bank Arena (8,898); Bridgeport, CT
*Non-conference game. ^{#}Rankings from AP Poll. (#) Tournament seedings in parentheses. B=Bridgeport Region. All times are in Pacific Time.

== See also ==
- 2015–16 UCLA Bruins men's basketball team

== Notes ==
- February 29, 2016 – Jordin Canada, Nirra Fields, and Monique Billings (honorable mention) were named to the All-Pac-12 team.
- March 23, 2016 – Coach Cori Close was named the 2016 United States Marine Corps/WBCA NCAA Division I Region 5 Coach of the Year.
- March 29, 2916 – Jordin Canada received an Honorable Mention on the Associated Press All-America team.
