= 2015–16 Oregon State Beavers women's basketball team =

Intercollegiate basketball season

2015–16 Oregon State Beavers women's basketball

Pac-12 Tournament champions Pac-12 regular season co-champions

NCAA tournament, Final Four
- Conference: Pac-12 Conference

Ranking
- Coaches: No. 2
- AP: No. 6
- Record: 32–5 (16–2 Pac-12)
- Head coach: Scott Rueck (6th season)
- Associate head coach: Jonas Chatterton
- Assistant coaches: Eric Ely; Mandy Close
- Home arena: Gill Coliseum

2015–16 Pac-12 Conference women's basketball standings
	Conf.				Overall
Team	W		L	PCT	W		L	PCT
No. 6 Oregon State †	16	–	2	.889	32	–	5	.865
No. 11 Arizona State	16	–	2	.889	26	–	7	.788
No. 13 Stanford	14	–	4	.778	27	–	8	.771
No. 10 UCLA	14	–	4	.778	26	–	9	.743
Washington	11	–	7	.611	26	–	11	.703
Oregon	9	–	9	.500	24	–	11	.686
Utah	8	–	10	.444	18	–	15	.545
USC	6	–	12	.333	19	–	13	.594
Washington State	5	–	13	.278	14	–	16	.467
California	4	–	14	.222	15	–	17	.469
Arizona	3	–	15	.167	13	–	19	.406
Colorado	2	–	16	.111	7	–	23	.233
† 2016 Pac-12 Tournament winner As of April 3, 2016; Rankings from AP Poll

The 2015–16 Oregon State Beavers women's basketball team represented Oregon State University during the 2015–16 NCAA Division I women's basketball season. The Beavers, led by sixth year head coach Scott Rueck, played their games at the Gill Coliseum and are members of the Pac-12 Conference. They finished the season 32–5, 16–2 in Pac-12 play to share the Pac-12 regular season title with Arizona State. They won the Pac-12 women's tournament for the first time in school history and received an automatic bid of the NCAA women's tournament where they defeated Troy and St. Bonaventure in the first and second rounds, DePaul in the Sweet Sixteen and Baylor in the Elite Eight to reach the Final Four for the first time school history. They lost to eventual winner Connecticut in the Final Four. With 32 wins in the regular season, they ended the season with the most wins in program history.

== Roster ==
2015–16 Oregon State Beavers women's basketball team
Players
Coaches

Pos.	#	Name	Height	Year	Previous school	Hometown
F/C	4	Breanna Brown	6 ft 3 in (1.91 m)	RS So	Bishop O'Dowd HS	Oakland, CA
F	5	Samantha Siegner	6 ft 3 in (1.91 m)	Sr	West Albany HS	Albany, OR
G	10	Katie McWilliams	6 ft 2 in (1.88 m)	Fr	South Salem HS	Salem, OR
G	11	Gabriella Hanson	5 ft 11 in (1.8 m)	Jr	Troy HS	Anaheim, CA
F	12	Kolbie Orum	6 ft 3 in (1.91 m)	Jr	Maple Ridge Secondary	Maple Ridge, BC
G	15	Jamie Weisner	5 ft 10 in (1.78 m)	Sr	Clarkston HS	Clarkston, WA
C	21	Marie Gülich	6 ft 5 in (1.96 m)	So	Landrat-Lucas Gymnasium	Cologne, Germany
G	22	Jen'Von'Ta Hill	5 ft 8 in (1.73 m)	Sr	Hutchinson CC; Skyline HS	St. Paul, MN
G	24	Sydney Wiese	6 ft 0 in (1.83 m)	Jr	Pinnacle HS	Phoenix, AZ
G	25	Taylor Kalmer	5 ft 8 in (1.73 m)	Fr	Corona del Sol HS	Chandler, AZ
C	31	Tarea Green	6 ft 4 in (1.93 m)	Fr	Hillsboro HS	Hillsboro, OR
F	32	Deven Hunter	6 ft 3 in (1.91 m)	Sr	McNary HS	Keizer, OR
C	44	Ruth Hamblin	6 ft 6 in (1.98 m)	Sr	Houston Christian School	Houston, BC

Head coach

- Scott Rueck (Oregon State)

Assistant coach(es)

- Jonas Chatterton (Utah)
- Eric Ely (Northwest Nazarene)
- Mandy Close (Oregon State)

Legend

- (C) Team captain
- (S) Suspended
- (I) Ineligible
- (W) Walk-on
- Injured
- Current redshirt

Roster

== Rankings ==
Regular season polls
Poll	Pre- Season	Week 2	Week 3	Week 4	Week 5	Week 6	Week 7	Week 8	Week 9	Week 10	Week 11	Week 12	Week 13	Week 14	Week 15	Week 16	Week 17	Week 18	Week 19	Final
AP	10	9	7	7	7	7	11	10	11	12	11	9	9	8	7	7	8	6	6	N/A
Coaches	9	7	7	7	7	7	9	10	12	10	8	8	8	8	8	7	8	6	6	2

Legend
	Increase in ranking
	Decrease in ranking
	Not ranked previous week
(RV)	Received Votes

== Schedule ==
Date time, TV	Rank^{#}	Opponent^{#}	Result	Record	Site (attendance) city, state
Exhibition
11/08/2015*; 3:00 pm	No. 10	Corban	W 98–48		Gill Coliseum (2,508); Corvallis, OR
Non-conference regular season
11/13/2015*; 7:00 pm	No. 10	Longwood	W 110–45	1–0	Gill Coliseum (2,651); Corvallis, OR
11/16/2015*; 7:00 pm, TheW.tv	No. 9	at Portland	W 94–50	2–0	Chiles Center (903); Portland, OR
11/22/2015*; 2:00 pm	No. 9	UC Riverside	W 86–65	3–0	Gill Coliseum (2,707); Corvallis, OR
11/27/2015*; 10:15 am	No. 7	vs. Hofstra; San Juan Shootout	W 73–50	4–0	Mario Morales Coliseum; Guaynabo, PR
11/28/2015*; 12:30 pm	No. 7	vs. Arkansas; San Juan Shootout	W 63–47	5–0	Mario Morales Coliseum; Guaynabo, PR
12/03/2015*; 4:00 pm, FS1	No. 7	at Marquette	W 65–58	6–0	Al McGuire Center (1,258); Milwaukee, WI
12/12/2015*; 2:00 pm	No. 7	Idaho	W 69–44	7–0	Gill Coliseum (2,834); Corvallis, OR
12/15/2015*; 11:00 am	No. 7	Cal State Bakersfield	W 75–51	8–0	Gill Coliseum (7,824); Corvallis, OR
12/19/2015*; 6:00 pm, P12N	No. 7	No. 14 Tennessee	L 50–53	8–1	Gill Coliseum (8,223); Corvallis, OR
12/21/2015*; 3:00 pm	No. 11	Cal Poly	W 80–43	9–1	Gill Coliseum (2,716); Corvallis, OR
12/28/2015*; 4:00 pm, ESPN3	No. 10	at No. 3 Notre Dame	L 61–62	9–2	Edmund P. Joyce Center (8,860); South Bend, IN
Pac-12 regular season
01/02/2016; 6:00 pm, P12N	No. 10	at USC	W 57–49	10–2 (1–0)	Galen Center (498); Los Angeles, CA
01/04/2016; 7:00 pm, P12N	No. 11	at No. 15 UCLA	L 51–71	10–3 (1–1)	Pauley Pavilion (1,161); Los Angeles, CA
01/08/2016; 7:00 pm, P12N	No. 11	Oregon; Civil War	W 60–33	11–3 (2–1)	Gill Coliseum (4,462); Corvallis, OR
01/10/2016; 12:00 pm, P12N	No. 11	at Oregon; Civil War	W 59–45	12–3 (3–1)	Matthew Knight Arena (2,806); Eugene, OR
01/15/2016; 8:00 pm, P12N	No. 12	California	W 70–48	13–3 (4–1)	Gill Coliseum (2,891); Corvallis, OR
01/17/2016; 6:00 pm, P12N	No. 12	No. 11 Stanford	W 58–50	14–3 (5–1)	Gill Coliseum (4,314); Corvallis, OR
01/22/2016; 7:00 pm, P12N	No. 11	at Utah	W 62–53	15–3 (6–1)	Jon M. Huntsman Center (1,761); Salt Lake City, UT
01/24/2016; 2:00 pm, P12N	No. 11	at Colorado	W 61–47	16–3 (7–1)	Coors Events Center (1,711); Boulder, CO
01/29/2016; 6:00 pm, P12N	No. 9	Arizona	W 71–43	17–3 (8–1)	Gill Coliseum (3,402); Corvallis, OR
02/01/2016; 8:00 pm, ESPN2	No. 9	No. 8 Arizona State	W 67–44	18–3 (9–1)	Gill Coliseum (4,427); Corvallis, OR
02/05/2016; 6:00 pm, P12N	No. 9	at No. 24 Washington	W 61–53	19–3 (10–1)	Alaska Airlines Arena (3,813); Seattle, WA
02/07/2016; 11:00 am	No. 9	at Washington State	W 54–45	20–3 (11–1)	Beasley Coliseum (687); Pullman, WA
02/12/2016; 7:30 pm, P12N	No. 8	Colorado	W 73–50	21–3 (12–1)	Gill Coliseum (3,677); Corvallis, OR
02/14/2016; 1:00 pm	No. 8	Utah	W 72–53	22–3 (13–1)	Gill Coliseum (4,278); Corvallis, OR
02/19/2016; 8:00 pm, P12N	No. 7	USC	W 76–52	23–3 (14–1)	Gill Coliseum (3,615); Corvallis, OR
02/21/2016; 6:00 pm, P12N	No. 7	No. 12 UCLA	W 64–54	24–3 (15–1)	Gill Coliseum (5,654); Corvallis, OR
02/26/2016; 8:00 pm, P12N	No. 7	at No. 13 Stanford	L 54–76	24–4 (15–2)	Maples Pavilion (3,613); Stanford, CA
02/28/2016; 11:00 am, P12N	No. 7	at California	W 54–44	25–4 (16–2)	Haas Pavilion (2,036); Berkeley, CA
Pac-12 Women's Tournament
03/04/2016; 6:00 pm, P12N	(1) No. 8	vs. (8) USC; Quarterfinals	W 63–53	26–4	KeyArena; Seattle, WA
03/05/2016; 8:30 pm, P12N	(1) No. 8	vs. (5) Washington; Semifinals	W 57–55	27–4	KeyArena (6,543); Seattle, WA
03/06/2016; 6:00 pm, ESPN	(1) No. 8	vs. (3) No. 12 UCLA; Championship Game	W 69–57	28–4	KeyArena (4,759); Seattle, WA
NCAA Women's Tournament
03/18/2016*; 2:00 pm, ESPN2	(2 D) No. 6	(15 D) Troy; First Round	W 73–31	29–4	Gill Coliseum (4,702); Corvallis, OR
03/20/2016*; 6:00 pm, ESPN2	(2 D) No. 6	(10 D) St. Bonaventure; Second Round	W 69–40	30–4	Gill Coliseum (6,074); Corvallis, OR
03/26/2016*; 3:00 pm, ESPN	(2 D) No. 6	vs. (6 D) No. 20 DePaul; Sweet Sixteen	W 83–71	31–4	American Airlines Center (7,109); Dallas, TX
03/28/2016*; 6:00 pm, ESPN	(2 D) No. 6	vs. (1 D) No. 4 Baylor; Elite Eight	W 60–57	32–4	American Airlines Center (6,050); Dallas, TX
04/03/2016*; 3:00 pm, ESPN	(2 D) No. 6	vs. (1 B) No. 1 Connecticut; Final Four	L 51–80	32–5	Bankers Life Fieldhouse; Indianapolis, IN
*Non-conference game. ^{#}Rankings from AP Poll. (#) Tournament seedings in parentheses. D=Dallas Region. All times are in Pacific Time.

== See also ==
- 2015–16 Oregon State Beavers men's basketball team
