= 2015–16 Washington Huskies women's basketball team =

Intercollegiate basketball season

2015–16 Washington Huskies women's basketball

NCAA Tournament Lexington Regional Champions

NCAA tournament, Final Four
- Conference: Pac-12 Conference

Ranking
- Coaches: No. 8
- Record: 26–11 (11–7 Pac-12)
- Head coach: Mike Neighbors (3rd season)
- Assistant coaches: Adia Barnes; Fred Castro; Morgan Valley
- Home arena: Alaska Airlines Arena

2015–16 Pac-12 Conference women's basketball standings
	Conf.				Overall
Team	W		L	PCT	W		L	PCT
No. 6 Oregon State †	16	–	2	.889	32	–	5	.865
No. 11 Arizona State	16	–	2	.889	26	–	7	.788
No. 13 Stanford	14	–	4	.778	27	–	8	.771
No. 10 UCLA	14	–	4	.778	26	–	9	.743
Washington	11	–	7	.611	26	–	11	.703
Oregon	9	–	9	.500	24	–	11	.686
Utah	8	–	10	.444	18	–	15	.545
USC	6	–	12	.333	19	–	13	.594
Washington State	5	–	13	.278	14	–	16	.467
California	4	–	14	.222	15	–	17	.469
Arizona	3	–	15	.167	13	–	19	.406
Colorado	2	–	16	.111	7	–	23	.233
† 2016 Pac-12 Tournament winner As of April 3, 2016; Rankings from AP Poll

The 2015–16 Washington Huskies women's basketball team represented the University of Washington during the 2015–16 NCAA Division I women's basketball season. The Huskies, led by third-year head coach Mike Neighbors, played their home games at Alaska Airlines Arena and were members of the Pac-12 Conference. They finished the season 26–11, 11–7 in Pac-12 play to finish in fifth place. They advanced to the semifinals of the Pac-12 women's tournament, where they lost to Oregon State. They received an at-large bid to the NCAA women's tournament, where they defeated Penn and Maryland in the first and second rounds, Kentucky in the Sweet Sixteen, and Pac-12 member Stanford in the Elite Eight to reach the Final Four for the first time in school history. They lost to Syracuse in the Final Four.

== Roster ==
2015–16 Washington Huskies women's basketball team
Players
Coaches

Pos.	#	Name	Height	Year	Previous school	Hometown
F/C	0	Chantel Osahor	6 ft 2 in (1.88 m)	Jr	Saint Mary's	Phoenix, AZ
F	1	Hannah Johnson	6 ft 1 in (1.85 m)	RS Fr	Bishop Alemany	Los Angeles, CA
F	3	Talia Walton	6 ft 2 in (1.88 m)	RS Sr	Federal Way	Federal Way, WA
G	10	Kelsey Plum	5 ft 9 in (1.75 m)	Jr	La Jolla Country Day	Poway, CA
F/C	11	Mathilde Gilling	6 ft 3 in (1.91 m)	Sr	Rungsted Gymnasium	Rungsted Kyst, Denmark
F/C	13	Katie Collier	6 ft 3 in (1.91 m)	RS Jr	Seattle Christian	Covington, WA
G/F	14	Heather Corral	6 ft 1 in (1.85 m)	RS Jr	Prairie	Vancouver, WA
G/F	15	Khalia Lark	6 ft 0 in (1.83 m)	So	Mater Dei	Irvine, CA
G	20	Kelli Kingma	5 ft 8 in (1.73 m)	So	Henry M. Jackson	Mill Creek, WA
G	21	Brianna Ruiz	5 ft 10 in (1.78 m)	RS So	Del Oro	Sacramento, CA
G	22	Alexus Atchley	5 ft 9 in (1.75 m)	Sr	Yorba Linda	Yorba Linda, CA
C	34	Deja Strother	6 ft 5 in (1.96 m)	Fr	Inglemoor	Kenmore, WA
G	42	Mackenzie Wieburg	5 ft 9 in (1.75 m)	So	Issaquah	Sammamish, WA

Head coach

Mike Neighbors (Arkansas)

Assistant coach(es)

Adia Barnes (Arizona)
Fred Castro (Oklahoma)
Morgan Valley (Connecticut)

Legend

- (C) Team captain
- (S) Suspended
- (I) Ineligible
- (W) Walk-on
- Injured
- Current redshirt

Roster
Last update: 2015-07-02

== Schedule ==
Date time, TV	Rank^{#}	Opponent^{#}	Result	Record	Site (attendance) city, state
Exhibition
11/02/2015*; 7:00 pm		Concordia (OR)	W 92–46		Alaska Airlines Arena; Seattle, WA
11/08/2015*; 2:00 pm		Warner Pacific	W 88–44		Alaska Airlines Arena; Seattle, WA
Non-conference regular season
11/14/2015*; 2:00 pm		Santa Clara	W 100–55	1–0	Alaska Airlines Arena (1,868); Seattle, WA
11/18/2015*; 7:00 pm		Seattle	W 96–55	2–0	Alaska Airlines Arena (1,160); Seattle, WA
11/20/2015*; 7:00 pm		at Fresno State	W 89–79	3–0	Save Mart Center (2,983); Fresno, CA
11/23/2015*; 7:00 pm		San Diego State	W 80–51	4–0	Alaska Airlines Arena (504); Seattle, WA
11/27/2015*; 6:45 pm		vs. No. 23 Syracuse; South Point Thanksgiving Shootout	L 62–66	4–1	South Point Arena; Enterprise, NV
11/28/2015*; 6:45 pm		vs. Texas Tech; South Point Thanksgiving Shootout	W 77–73	5–1	South Point Arena (144); Enterprise, NV
12/02/2015*; 7:00 pm		Portland	W 83–65	6–1	Alaska Airlines Arena (1,173); Seattle, WA
12/06/2015*; 3:30 pm, P12N		No. 21 Oklahoma	L 68–71	6–2	Alaska Airlines Arena (1,580); Seattle, WA
12/12/2015*; 6:00 pm, ESPN3		at South Dakota	W 77–64	7–2	DakotaDome (2,235); Vermillion, SD
12/18/2015*; 7:00 pm		UC Riverside	W 78–43	8–2	Alaska Airlines Arena (1,174); Seattle, WA
12/21/2015*; 7:00 pm		Weber State	W 69–56	9–2	Alaska Airlines Arena (1,550); Seattle, WA
Pac-12 regular season
12/29/2015; 8:00 pm, P12N		at Washington State	W 79–64	10–2 (1–0)	Beasley Coliseum (837); Pullman, WA
01/02/2016; 12:00 pm, P12N		at Colorado	W 76–74	11–2 (2–0)	Coors Events Center (2,107); Boulder, CO
01/04/2016; 5:00 pm, P12N		at Utah	L 83–88	11–3 (2–1)	Jon M. Huntsman Center (884); Salt Lake City, UT
01/08/2016; 7:00 pm, P12N		No. 14 Arizona State	L 61–68	11–4 (2–2)	Alaska Airlines Arena (1,767); Seattle, WA
01/10/2016; 2:00 pm, P12N		Arizona	W 63–47	12–4 (3–2)	Alaska Airlines Arena (2,913); Seattle, WA
01/15/2016; 6:00 pm, P12N		No. 17 UCLA	W 64–56	13–4 (4–2)	Alaska Airlines Arena (1,547); Seattle, WA
01/17/2016; 2:00 pm, P12N		No. 25 USC	W 69–60	14–4 (5–2)	Alaska Airlines Arena (1,790); Seattle, WA
01/23/2015; 2:00 pm, P12N		Washington State	W 69–63	15–4 (6–2)	Alaska Airlines Arena (3,157); Seattle, WA
01/29/2016; 8:00 pm, P12N	No. 25	at No. 16 Stanford	L 53–69	15–5 (6–3)	Maples Pavilion (2,858); Stanford, CA
01/31/2016; 2:00 pm, P12N	No. 25	at California	W 75–65	16–5 (7–3)	Haas Pavilion (2,132); Berkeley, CA
02/05/2016; 6:00 pm, P12N	No. 24	No. 9 Oregon State	L 53–61	16–6 (7–4)	Alaska Airlines Arena (3,813); Seattle, WA
02/07/2016; 12:00 pm	No. 24	Oregon	L 63–75	16–7 (7–5)	Alaska Airlines Arena (1,974); Seattle, WA
02/12/2016; 7:00 pm		at USC	W 61–53	17–7 (8–5)	Galen Center (565); Los Angeles, CA
02/14/2016; 11:00 am, ESPNU		at No. 14 UCLA	L 59–63	17–8 (8–6)	Pauley Pavilion (1,609); Los Angeles, CA
02/19/2016; 6:00 pm		at Arizona	W 74–52	18–8 (9–6)	McKale Center (1,243); Tucson, AZ
02/21/2016; 11:00 am, P12N		at No. 9 Arizona State	L 57–77	18–9 (9–7)	Wells Fargo Arena (3,244); Tempe, AZ
02/25/2016; 7:00 pm		Utah	W 73–60	19–9 (10–7)	Alaska Airlines Arena (1,733); Seattle, WA
02/27/2016; 1:00 pm, P12N		Colorado	W 68–47	20–9 (11–7)	Alaska Airlines Arena (2,376); Seattle, WA
Pac-12 Women's Tournament
03/03/2016; 8:30 pm, P12N	(5)	vs. (12) Colorado; First Round	W 67–51	21–9	KeyArena (3,680); Seattle, WA
03/04/2016; 8:30 pm, P12N	(5)	vs. (4) No. 11 Stanford; Quarterfinals	W 73–65	22–9	KeyArena (5,789); Seattle, WA
03/05/2016; 8:30 pm, P12N	(5)	vs. (1) No. 8 Oregon State; Semifinals	L 55–57	22–10	KeyArena (6,543); Seattle, WA
NCAA Women's Tournament
03/19/2016*; 1:00 pm, ESPN2	(7 L)	vs. (10 L) Penn; First Round	W 65–53	23–10	Xfinity Center (5,374); College Park, MD
03/21/2016*; 3:30 pm, ESPN2	(7 L)	at (2 L) No. 5 Maryland; Second Round	W 74–65	24–10	Xfinity Center (4,396); College Park, MD
03/25/2016*; 4:00 pm, ESPN2	(7 L)	vs. (3 L) No. 12 Kentucky; Sweet Sixteen	W 85–72	25–10	Rupp Arena; Lexington, KY
03/27/2016*; 10:00 am, ESPN	(7 L)	vs. (4 L) No. 13 Stanford; Elite Eight	W 85–76	26–10	Rupp Arena (3,349); Lexington, KY
04/03/2016*; 5:30 pm, ESPN2	(7 L)	vs. (4 SF) No. 14 Syracuse; Final Four	L 59–80	26–11	Bankers Life Fieldhouse (15,227); Indianapolis, IN
*Non-conference game. ^{#}Rankings from AP Poll. (#) Tournament seedings in parentheses. L=Lexington Region. All times are in Pacific Time.

== Rankings ==
Regular season polls
Poll	Pre- season	Week 2	Week 3	Week 4	Week 5	Week 6	Week 7	Week 8	Week 9	Week 10	Week 11	Week 12	Week 13	Week 14	Week 15	Week 16	Week 17	Week 18	Week 19	Final
AP	NR	NR	RV	NR	NR	NR	RV	NR	RV	NR	RV	25	24	RV	RV	RV	NR	RV	RV	N/A
Coaches	RV	NR	RV	RV	RV	RV	NR	NR	NR	NR	RV	RV	RV	NR	NR	NR	NR	NR	NR	8

Legend
	Increase in ranking
	Decrease in ranking
	Not ranked previous week
(RV)	Received votes

== See also ==
- 2015–16 Washington Huskies men's basketball team
