= Niya Butts =

American basketball coach (born 1978)

Biographical details
- Born: January 10, 1978 (age 48); Americus, Georgia

Playing career
- 1996–2000: Tennessee
- Position: Forward

Coaching career (HC unless noted)
- 2000–2002: Tennessee Tech (asst.)
- 2002–2003: Michigan State (asst.)
- 2003–2008: Kentucky (asst.)
- 2008–2016: Arizona
- 2016–2024: Kentucky (asst.)

Head coaching record
- Overall: 102–147 (.410)

Niya Denise Butts (born January 10, 1978) is a former American women's college basketball coach, most recently serving as associate head coach at the University of Kentucky. She is the former head coach at the University of Arizona. As a player, she was a part of two national championships at the University of Tennessee.

Butts, a 6'0" forward from Americus, Georgia, played college basketball for Hall of Fame coach Pat Summitt at Tennessee from 1996 to 2000. She was a reserve for the Lady Vols, averaging 2.3 points and 1.2 rebounds per game, but was a part of National Championship teams in both 1997 and 1998. She was also a three-time Southeastern Conference All-Academic selection.

Following the close of her playing career, Butts entered the coaching ranks by taking an assistant coach role at Tennessee Tech in 2000. After two years there, she spent a season at Michigan State, then moved to the University of Kentucky as an assistant for head coach Mickie DeMoss. She was promoted to associate head coach for the 2007–08 season.

In 2008, she was named the first African-American head women's basketball coach at Arizona. On March 4, 2016, she coached her last game for Arizona at the Pac-12 tournament.

On May 14, 2016, the University of Kentucky announced that Butts would be returning to the women's basketball program as an assistant coach under head coach Matthew Mitchell.

== Head coaching record ==
Record table
Season	Team	Overall	Conference	Standing	Postseason
Arizona (Pac-12 Conference) (2008–present)
2008–09	Arizona	12–19	4–14	T–8th	
2009–10	Arizona	14–17	6–12	8th	
2010–11	Arizona	21–12	10–8	T–4th	WNIT First Round
2011–12	Arizona	15–17	3–15	12th	
2012–13	Arizona	12–18	4–14	T–11th	
2013–14	Arizona	5–25	1–17	12th	
2014–15	Arizona	10–20	3–15	T–11th	
2015–16	Arizona	13–19	3–15	11th	
Arizona:		102–147 (.410)	34–110 (.236)		
Total:		102–147 (.410)			
National champion Postseason invitational champion Conference regular season champion Conference regular season and conference tournament champion Division regular season champion Division regular season and conference tournament champion Conference tournament champion
