= 2015–16 Conference USA men's basketball season =

- League: NCAA Division I
- Sport: Basketball
- Teams: 14
- TV partner(s): CBS Sports Network, Fox Sports, American Sports Network

2015–16 NCAA Division I men's basketball season
- Regular season champions: UAB
- Runners-up: Middle Tennessee
- Season MVP: Alex Hamilton

Tournament
- Champions: Middle Tennessee
- Runners-up: Old Dominion
- Finals MVP: Reggie Upshaw

Basketball seasons
- ← 2014–15 2016–17 →

2015–16 Conference USA men's basketball standings
	Conf.				Overall
Team	W		L	PCT	W		L	PCT
UAB	16	–	2	.889	26	–	7	.788
Middle Tennessee †	13	–	5	.722	25	–	10	.714
Marshall	12	–	6	.667	17	–	16	.515
Louisiana Tech	12	–	6	.667	23	–	10	.697
Old Dominion	12	–	6	.667	25	–	13	.658
UTEP	10	–	8	.556	19	–	14	.576
Charlotte	9	–	9	.500	14	–	19	.424
Western Kentucky	8	–	10	.444	18	–	16	.529
North Texas	7	–	11	.389	12	–	20	.375
Rice	7	–	11	.389	12	–	20	.375
FIU	7	–	11	.389	13	–	19	.406
Florida Atlantic	5	–	13	.278	8	–	25	.242
Southern Miss*	5	–	13	.278	8	–	21	.276
UTSA	3	–	15	.167	5	–	27	.156
† 2016 C-USA Tournament winner *Ineligible for postseason play due to self-imposed postseason ban.

The 2015–16 Conference USA men's basketball season began with practices in October 2015, followed by the start of the 2015–16 NCAA Division I men's basketball season in November.

== Preseason ==
=== Preseason Polls ===
	C-USA Coaches
1.	UAB (11)
2.	Old Dominion (3)
3.	Middle Tennessee
4.	UTEP
5.	Louisiana Tech
6.	WKU
7.	Rice
8.	North Texas
9.	Marshall
10.	FIU
11.	Charlotte
12.	Florida Atlantic
13.	UTSA
14.	Southern Miss

=== Preseason All-Conference Team ===
C-USA Coaches
Adrian Diaz, F FIU
Alex Hamilton, G Louisiana Tech
Erik McCree, F Louisiana Tech
Ryan Taylor, F Marshall
Reggie Upshaw Jr., G Middle Tennessee
Trey Freeman, G Old Dominion
Marcus Jackson, G Rice
Robert Brown, G UAB
William Lee, F UAB
Earvin Morris, F UTEP

== Rankings ==
Legend
	Improvement in ranking
	Drop in ranking
	Not ranked previous week
RV	Received votes but were not ranked in Top 25 of poll

		Pre/ Wk 1	Wk 2	Wk 3	Wk 4	Wk 5	Wk 6	Wk 7	Wk 8	Wk 9	Wk 10	Wk 11	Wk 12	Wk 13	Wk 14	Wk 15	Wk 16	Wk 17	Wk 18	Wk 19	Final
Charlotte	AP																				
Charlotte	C																				
FIU	AP																				
FIU	C																				
Florida Atlantic	AP																				
Florida Atlantic	C																				
Louisiana Tech	AP				RV																
Louisiana Tech	C																				
Marshall	AP																				
Marshall	C																				
Middle Tennessee	AP																				
Middle Tennessee	C																				
North Texas	AP																				
North Texas	C																				
Old Dominion	AP	RV	RV																		
Old Dominion	C	RV	RV																		
Rice	AP																				
Rice	C																				
Southern Miss	AP																				
Southern Miss	C																				
UAB	AP												RV								
UAB	C											RV	RV	RV							
UTEP	AP				RV																
UTEP	C				RV																
UTSA	AP																				
UTSA	C																				
WKU	AP																				
WKU	C																				

== Conference schedules ==
=== Conference matrix ===
This table summarizes the head-to-head results between teams in conference play.

	Charlotte	FIU	FAU	LaTech	Marshall	MTSU	UNT	ODU	Rice	USM	UAB	UTEP	UTSA	WKU
vs. Charlotte	–	0–1	1-0	1-0	1–1	1-0	1–1	2-0	0-3	1-0	1-0	0-1	0-1	1–1
vs. FIU	1–0	–	0–2	0–1	1–0	2–0	1–0	1–0	1–0	1–0	2–0	2–1	0–2	0–1
vs. Florida Atlantic	0-1	2–0	–	0–1	1–0	2–0	1–0	2–0	1–0	0–1	2–0	2–0	0–3	1–0
vs. Louisiana Tech	0-1	1–0	1–0	–	0–1	0–1	1–1	1–0	0–2	0–2	0–1	1–1	0–2	1–0
vs. Marshall	1–1	0–1	0–1	1–0	–	1–1	0–1	0–2	0–1	0–1	2–0	1–0	0–1	0–2
vs. Middle Tennessee	0-1	0–2	0–2	1–0	1–1	–	0–1	0–1	0–1	0–1	2–0	0–1	0–1	1–1
vs. North Texas	1–1	0–1	0–1	1–1	1–0	1–0	–	2–0	1–1	1–1	1–0	1–0	0–1	2–0
vs. Old Dominion	0-2	0–1	0–2	0–1	2–0	1–0	0–2	–	1–1	1–0	1–0	0–1	0–1	0–2
vs. Rice	3-0	0–1	0–1	2–0	1–0	1–0	1–1	1–1	–	0–2	1–0	1–0	1–0	0–1
vs. Southern Miss	1-0	0–1	1–0	2–0	0–1	1–0	1–1	0–1	2–0	–	1–0	1–1	1–1	1–0
vs. UAB	0-1	0–2	0–2	1–0	0–2	0–2	0–1	0–1	0–1	0–1	–	0–1	0–1	1–1
vs. UTEP	1-0	1–2	0–2	1–1	0–1	1–0	0–1	1–0	0–1	1–1	1–0	–	1–1	0–1
vs. UTSA	1-0	2–0	3–0	2–0	1–0	1–0	1–0	1–0	0–1	1–1	1–0	1–1	–	1–0
vs. WKU	1–1	1–0	0–1	0–1	2–0	1–1	0–2	2–0	1–0	0–1	1–1	1–0	0–1	–
Total	10–9	7–12	6–14	12–6	11–7	13–5	7–12	13–6	7–12	6–12	16–2	11–8	3–16	9–10

== Honors and awards ==
=== Players of the Week ===
Throughout the conference regular season, the C-USA offices named one or two players of the week and one or two freshmen of the week each Monday.

Week	Player of the week	Freshman of the week
November 16, 2015	Chris Cokley, UAB	Ja'Michael Brown, North Texas
November 23, 2015	Adrian Diaz, FIU	Andrien White, Charlotte
November 30, 2015	Earvin Morris, UTEP	C. J. Burks, Marshall
November 30, 2015	Earvin Morris, UTEP	Marcus Evans, Rice
December 7, 2015	Adrian Diaz (2), FIU	Marcus Evans (2), Rice
December 14, 2015	Alex Hamilton, Louisiana Tech	C. J. Burks (2), Marshall
December 21, 2015	Erik McCree, Louisiana Tech	Marcus Evans (3), Rice
December 28, 2015	James Kelly, Marshall	Marcus Evans (4), Rice
January 4, 2016	Adrian Diaz (3), FIU	Andrien White (2), Charlotte
January 4, 2016	Alex Hamilton (2), Louisiana Tech	Andrien White (2), Charlotte
January 11, 2016	James Kelly (2), Marshall	Jon Davis, Charlotte
January 18, 2016	William Lee, UAB	Marquez Letcher-Ellis, Rice
January 25, 2016	Trey Freeman, Old Dominion	Jon Davis (2), Charlotte
February 1, 2016	Trey Freeman (2), Old Dominion	Marcus Evans (5), Rice
February 8, 2016	Trey Freeman (3), Old Dominion	Marcus Evans (6), Rice
February 15, 2016	Erik McCree (2), Louisiana Tech	Marcus Evans (7), Rice
February 22, 2016	James Kelly (3), Marshall	Marcus Evans (8), Rice
February 29, 2016	Alex Hamilton (3), Louisiana Tech	Marcus Evans (9), Rice
March 7, 2016	Alex Hamilton (4), Louisiana Tech	Marcus Evans (10), Rice

=== All-Conference USA Awards and Teams ===
2016 Conference USA Men's Basketball Individual Awards
Award	Recipient(s)	Team
Player of the Year	Alex Hamilton	Louisiana Tech
Gene Bartow Coach of the Year	Jerod Haase	UAB
Defensive Player of the Year	William Lee	UAB
Freshman of the Year	Marcus Evans	Rice
Newcomer of the Year	James Kelly	Marshall
Sixth Man Award	Dirk Williams	UAB

2016 Conference USA Men's Basketball All-Conference Teams
First Team	Second Team	Third Team	All-Freshman Team	All-Defensive Team	All-Academic Team
Alex Hamilton (La. Tech); James Kelly (Marshall); Trey Freeman (ODU); Marcus Evans (Rice); Robert Brown (UAB)	Joseph Uchebo (Charlotte); Adrian Diaz (FIU); Erik McCree (La. Tech); Jeremy Combs (N. Texas); Chris Cokley (UAB)	Giddy Potts (MTSU); Reggie Upshaw Jr. (MTSU); William Lee (UAB); Nick Norton (UAB); Lee Moore(UTEP)	Jon Davis (Charlotte); Andrien White (Charlotte); Zoran Talley (ODU); Marcus Evans (Rice); Terry Winn (UTEP)	Adrian Diaz (FIU); Alex Hamilton (La. Tech); Brandan Stith (ODU); Marcus Evans (Rice); William Lee (UAB)	Jon Elmore (Marshall); Austin Loop (Marshall); Trey Freeman (ODU); Nick Norton (UAB); Dominic Artis (UTEP)
† - denotes unanimous selection

== Postseason ==
=== Conference USA Tournament ===
The conference tournament is scheduled for March 8–12 at Legacy Arena in Birmingham, AL.

=== NCAA tournament ===
Seed	Region	School	First Four	Round of 64	Round of 32	Sweet 16	Elite Eight	Final Four	Championship
15	Midwest	Middle Tennessee		W, 90–81 vs. #2 Michigan State – (St. Louis)	L, 50–75 vs. #10 Syracuse – (St. Louis)				
		W–L (%):	0–0 –	1–0 1.000	0–1 .000	0–0 –	0–0 –	0–0 –	0–0 –Total: 1–1 .500

=== National Invitation Tournament ===
Seed	Bracket	School	First round	Second round	Quarterfinals	Semifinals	Finals
7	St. Bonaventure	UAB	L, 79–97 vs. #2 BYU				
		W–L (%):	0–1 .000	0–0 –	0–0 –	0–0 –	0–0 – Total: 0–1 .000
