= 2015–16 Marshall Thundering Herd men's basketball team =

American college basketball season

2015–16 Marshall Thundering Herd men's basketball
- Conference: Conference USA
- Record: 17–16 (12–6 C-USA)
- Head coach: Dan D'Antoni (2nd season)
- Assistant coaches: Mark Cline; Scott Rigot; Chris Duhon
- Home arena: Cam Henderson Center

2015–16 Conference USA men's basketball standings
	Conf.				Overall
Team	W		L	PCT	W		L	PCT
UAB	16	–	2	.889	26	–	7	.788
Middle Tennessee †	13	–	5	.722	25	–	10	.714
Marshall	12	–	6	.667	17	–	16	.515
Louisiana Tech	12	–	6	.667	23	–	10	.697
Old Dominion	12	–	6	.667	25	–	13	.658
UTEP	10	–	8	.556	19	–	14	.576
Charlotte	9	–	9	.500	14	–	19	.424
Western Kentucky	8	–	10	.444	18	–	16	.529
North Texas	7	–	11	.389	12	–	20	.375
Rice	7	–	11	.389	12	–	20	.375
FIU	7	–	11	.389	13	–	19	.406
Florida Atlantic	5	–	13	.278	8	–	25	.242
Southern Miss*	5	–	13	.278	8	–	21	.276
UTSA	3	–	15	.167	5	–	27	.156
† 2016 C-USA Tournament winner *Ineligible for postseason play due to self-imposed postseason ban.

The 2015–16 Marshall Thundering Herd men's basketball team represented Marshall University during the 2015–16 NCAA Division I men's basketball season. The Thundering Herd, led by second year head coach Dan D'Antoni, played their home games at the Cam Henderson Center and were members of Conference USA. They finished the season 17–16, 12–6 in C-USA play to finish in a three-way tie for third place. They defeated UTEP in the quarterfinals of the C-USA tournament to advance to the semifinals where they lost to Middle Tennessee.

== Previous season ==
The Thundering Herd finished the 2014–15 season 11–21, 7–11 in C-USA play to finish in a tie for eleventh place. They lost in the first round of the C-USA tournament to WKU.

== Offseason ==
=== Departures ===
Name	Number	Pos.	Height	Weight	Year	Hometown	Notes
Shawn Smith	1	F	6'6"	228	Senior	Sacramento, CA	Graduated
Jay Johnson	3	F	6'7"	232	Junior	Versailles, KY	Graduated & transferred to Kentucky Wesleyan
Cheikh Sane	5	F	6'9"	225	Senior	Dakar, Senegal	Graduated
DeVince Boykins	15	G	6'4"	210	RS Junior	Forest City, NC	Graduated & transferred to Georgia Southern
J. P. Kambola	31	C	6'9"	244	Senior	Toronto, ON	Graduated
Tamron Manning	32	G	6'4"	210	Junior	Georgetown, KY	Graduated & transferred to Kentucky Wesleyan

=== Incoming transfers ===
Name	Number	Pos.	Height	Weight	Year	Hometown	Previous School
Terrence Thompson	1	G	6'7"	200	Sophomore	Durham, NC	Junior college transferred from Georgia Highlands College
Jon Elmore	4	G	6'4"	175	Sophomore	Charleston, WV	Transferred from VMI. Under NCAA transfer rules, Elmore will have to sit out for the first semester of the 2015–16 season. Will have three years of remaining eligibility.

=== 2015 recruiting class ===
College recruiting information
Name	Hometown	School	Height	Weight	Commit date
Christian Thieneman; SF	Louisville, KY	Trinity High School	6 ft 5 in (1.96 m)	200 lb (91 kg)	Oct 2, 2014
Christian Thieneman; SF	Recruit ratings: Scout: Rivals: (NR)				
Aleksandar Dozic; SF	Podgorica, Crna Gora	Don Bosco Prep High School	6 ft 9 in (2.06 m)	220 lb (100 kg)	Apr 23, 2015
Aleksandar Dozic; SF	Recruit ratings: Scout: Rivals: (NR)				
Overall recruit ranking: Scout: NR Rivals: NR ESPN: NR
Note: In many cases, Scout, Rivals, 247Sports, On3, and ESPN may conflict in their listings of height and weight.; In these cases, the average was taken. ESPN grades are on a 100-point scale.; Sources: "Marshall Basketball Commitment List". Rivals.; "2015 Marshall Basketball Commits". Scout.; "ESPN". ESPN.; "Scout.com Team Recruiting Rankings". Scout.; "2015 Team Ranking". Rivals.

== Roster ==
2015–16 Marshall Thundering Herd men's basketball team
Players
Coaches

Pos.	#	Name	Height	Weight	Year	Hometown
F	0	Christian Thieneman	6 ft 5 in (1.96 m)	205 lb (93 kg)	Fr	Louisville, Kentucky
F	1	Terrence Thompson	6 ft 7 in (2.01 m)	215 lb (98 kg)	So	Durham, North Carolina
G	2	Stevie Browning	6 ft 3 in (1.91 m)	180 lb (82 kg)	Jr	Logan, West Virginia
G	3	Brett Bowling (W)	6 ft 4 in (1.93 m)	192 lb (87 kg)	So	Pineville, West Virginia
F	4	Jacob Kilgore (W)	6 ft 5 in (1.96 m)	177 lb (80 kg)	Fr	Huntington, West Virginia
F	13	Ajdin Penava	6 ft 9 in (2.06 m)	200 lb (91 kg)	Fr	Sarajevo, Bosnia and Herzegovina
G	14	C. J. Burks	6 ft 3 in (1.91 m)	193 lb (88 kg)	RS Fr	Martinsburg, West Virginia
G	21	Aleksa Nikolić (injured)	6 ft 5 in (1.96 m)	206 lb (93 kg)	So	Pančevo, Serbia
G	23	Justin Edmonds	6 ft 4 in (1.93 m)	220 lb (100 kg)	RS Sr	Albion, Michigan
F	24	James Kelly	6 ft 8 in (2.03 m)	259 lb (117 kg)	Sr	Ann Arbor, Michigan
F	25	Ryan Taylor	6 ft 5 in (1.96 m)	225 lb (102 kg)	RS Jr	Indianapolis, Indiana
F	32	Aleksandar Dozic	6 ft 9 in (2.06 m)	220 lb (100 kg)	Fr	Podgorica, Montenegro
G	33	Jon Elmore	6 ft 3 in (1.91 m)	191 lb (87 kg)	So	Charleston, West Virginia
G	34	Noah Frampton (W)	6 ft 0 in (1.83 m)	193 lb (88 kg)	Fr	Poca, West Virginia
G	35	Austin Loop	6 ft 4 in (1.93 m)	207 lb (94 kg)	RS Jr	South Webster, Ohio
F	50	Milan Mijovic	6 ft 9 in (2.06 m)	243 lb (110 kg)	So	Belgrade, Serbia

Head coach

- Dan D'Antoni (Marshall)

Assistant coach(es)

- Mark Cline (Wake Forest)
- Scott Rigot (Buffalo)
- Chris Duhon (Duke)

Legend

- (C) Team captain
- (S) Suspended
- (I) Ineligible
- (W) Walk-on
- Injured
- Current redshirt

Roster

== Schedule ==
Date time, TV	Rank^{#}	Opponent^{#}	Result	Record	Site (attendance) city, state
Exhibition
11/12/2015*; 7:00 pm		Bluefield State	W 112–78		Cam Henderson Center (5,107); Huntington, WV
11/15/2015*; 3:30 pm		Newberry	L 89–101		Cam Henderson Center; Huntington, WV
Non-conference regular season
11/19/2015*; 7:00 pm, SECN+		at Tennessee	L 74–84	0–1	Thompson–Boling Arena (12,341); Knoxville, TN
11/24/2015*; 7:00 pm		at Morehead State	L 61–85	0–2	Ellis Johnson Arena (3,432); Morehead, KY
11/27/2015*; 7:30 pm		James Madison	L 75–89	0–3	Cam Henderson Center (4,683); Huntington, WV
12/02/2015*; 7:00 pm, ESPN3		at Ohio	L 70–85	0–4	Convocation Center (6,783); Athens, OH
12/04/2015*; 7:00 pm		Akron	L 65–75	0–5	Cam Henderson Center (4,631); Huntington, WV
12/06/2015*; 2:00 pm		at James Madison	L 84–107	0–6	JMU Convocation Center (3,404); Williamsburg, VA
12/09/2015*; 7:00 pm		Eastern Illinois; Global Sports Classic	W 82–76	1–6	Cam Henderson Center (4,391); Huntington, WV
12/12/2015*; 7:00 pm		Eastern Kentucky	W 96–72	2–6	Cam Henderson Center (4,553); Huntington, WV
12/14/2015*; 7:00 pm		North Carolina Central; Global Sports Classic	W 92–73	3–6	Cam Henderson Center (4,178); Huntington, WV
12/17/2015*; 7:00 pm, ESPNU		vs. No. 20 West Virginia; Chesapeake Energy Capital Classic	L 68–86	3–7	Charleston Civic Center (11,748); Charleston, WV
12/21/2015*; 10:30 pm		vs. Wyoming; Global Sports Classic semifinals	W 90–82	4–7	Cox Pavilion; Paradise, NV
12/22/2015*; 10:30 pm		vs. Grand Canyon; Global Sports Classic Championship	L 81–85	4–8	Cox Pavilion; Paradise, NV
12/27/2015*; 4:00 pm, BTN		at No. 4 Maryland	L 67–87	4–9	Xfinity Center (17,950); College Park, MD
Conference USA regular season
01/03/2016; 1:00 pm, ASN		WKU	W 94–76	5–9 (1–0)	Cam Henderson Center (4,623); Huntington, WV
01/07/2016; 7:00 pm		Florida Atlantic	W 90–67	6–9 (2–0)	Cam Henderson Center (4,577); Huntington, WV
01/09/2016; 7:00 pm		FIU	W 99–81	7–9 (3–0)	Cam Henderson Center (5,127); Huntington, WV
01/14/2016; 8:00 pm		at North Texas	W 97–78	8–9 (4–0)	The Super Pit (1,585); Denton, TX
01/16/2016; 8:00 pm		at Rice	W 94–90	9–9 (5–0)	Tudor Fieldhouse (2,196); Houston, TX
01/21/2016; 7:00 pm		at Charlotte	L 95–103	9–10 (5–1)	Dale F. Halton Arena (4,015); Charlotte, NC
01/23/2016; 2:00 pm, ASN		at Old Dominion	W 78–75	10–10 (6–1)	Ted Constant Convocation Center (7,140); Norfolk, VA
01/28/2016; 7:00 pm		Middle Tennessee	W 82–66	11–10 (7–1)	Cam Henderson Center (5,724); Huntington, WV
01/30/2016; 12:00 pm, CBSSN		UAB	L 78–81	11–11 (7–2)	Cam Henderson Center (7,085); Huntington, WV
02/04/2016; 9:05 pm		at UTEP	L 108–112	11–12 (7–3)	Don Haskins Center (6,993); El Paso, TX
02/06/2016; 2:00 pm, ASN		at UTSA	W 109–91	12–12 (8–3)	Convocation Center (900); San Antonio, TX
02/13/2016; 8:00 pm, FCS		at WKU	W 96–93 ^{OT}	13–12 (9–3)	E. A. Diddle Arena (4,373); Bowling Green, KY
02/18/2016; 7:00 pm, ASN		Charlotte	W 87–72	14–12 (10–3)	Cam Henderson Center (6,164); Huntington, WV
02/20/2016; 7:00 pm		Old Dominion	W 82–65	15–12 (11–3)	Cam Henderson Center (8,520); Huntington, WV
02/25/2016; 8:00 pm		at UAB	L 91–95	15–13 (11–4)	Bartow Arena (7,190); Birmingham, AL
02/27/2016; 6:00 pm		at Middle Tennessee	L 74–83	15–14 (11–5)	Murphy Center (4,051); Murfreesboro, TN
03/03/2016; 7:00 pm, ASN		Louisiana Tech	L 94–97	15–15 (11–6)	Cam Henderson Center (5,945); Huntington, WV
03/05/2016; 7:00 pm		Southern Miss	W 108–106 ^{OT}	16–15 (12–6)	Cam Henderson Center (6,431); Huntington, WV
Conference USA tournament
03/10/16; 9:30 pm, ASN	(3)	vs. (6) UTEP; Quarterfinals	W 87–85	17–15	Legacy Arena (3,933); Birmingham, AL
03/11/16; 6:30 pm, CBSSN	(3)	vs. (2) Middle Tennessee; Semifinals	L 90–99	17–16	Legacy Arena (6,176); Birmingham, AL
*Non-conference game. ^{#}Rankings from AP poll. (#) Tournament seedings in parentheses. All times are in Eastern Time.
