= 2015–16 Western Kentucky Hilltoppers basketball team =

American college basketball season

2015–16 Western Kentucky Hilltoppers basketball
- Conference: Conference USA
- Record: 18–16 (8–10 C-USA)
- Head coach: Ray Harper (4th season)
- Assistant coaches: David Boyden; Shawn Forrest; Chris Shumate
- Home arena: E. A. Diddle Arena

2015–16 Conference USA men's basketball standings
	Conf.				Overall
Team	W		L	PCT	W		L	PCT
UAB	16	–	2	.889	26	–	7	.788
Middle Tennessee †	13	–	5	.722	25	–	10	.714
Marshall	12	–	6	.667	17	–	16	.515
Louisiana Tech	12	–	6	.667	23	–	10	.697
Old Dominion	12	–	6	.667	25	–	13	.658
UTEP	10	–	8	.556	19	–	14	.576
Charlotte	9	–	9	.500	14	–	19	.424
Western Kentucky	8	–	10	.444	18	–	16	.529
North Texas	7	–	11	.389	12	–	20	.375
Rice	7	–	11	.389	12	–	20	.375
FIU	7	–	11	.389	13	–	19	.406
Florida Atlantic	5	–	13	.278	8	–	25	.242
Southern Miss*	5	–	13	.278	8	–	21	.276
UTSA	3	–	15	.167	5	–	27	.156
† 2016 C-USA Tournament winner *Ineligible for postseason play due to self-imposed postseason ban.

The 2015–16 Western Kentucky Hilltoppers men's basketball team represented Western Kentucky University during the 2015–16 NCAA Division I men's basketball season. The Hilltoppers were led by head coach Ray Harper in his fourth season. They played their home games at E. A. Diddle Arena and were second year members of Conference USA. They finished the season 18–16, 8–10 in C-USA play to finish in eighth place. They defeated North Texas and UAB to advance to the semifinals of the C-USA tournament where they lost to Old Dominion. Despite having 18 wins and a better they .500 record, they did not participate in a postseason tournament.

On March 17, 2016, head coach Ray Harper resigned after three players were suspended by a university disciplinary committee. He finished at WKU with a record of 90–62. On March 28, the school hired Rick Stansbury as head coach.

== Previous season ==
The Hilltoppers finished the season 20–12, 13–5 in C-USA play to finish in a tie for the second place. They advanced to the quarterfinals of the C-USA tournament where they lost to UAB. Despite having 20 wins they didn't play in a postseason tournament.

== Departures ==
Name	Number	Pos.	Height	Weight	Year	Hometown	Notes
Ayinde Sprewell	0	G	6'3"	188	Junior	Orlando, FL	Graduate transferred to St. Thomas
Kevin Kaspar	1	G	6'0"	173	Senior	Istanbul, Turkey	Graduated
Derrick Clayton	2	G	6'6"	184	Freshman	Castro Valley, CA	Transferred to Palm Beach State College
Trency Jackson	3	G	6'2"	188	RS Senior	Jackson, MS	Graduated
Brandon Price	5	G	5'9"	151	Sophomore	Radcliff, KY	Transferred to Georgia Southwestern
Jordan Green	10	F	6'7"	193	Freshman	Lexington, KY	Transferred to Coppin State
Avery Patterson	15	G	6'0"	190	Freshman	Decatur, GA	Transferred to Columbia State Community College
Rob Marberry	33	F	6'8"	230	Freshman	Nashville, TN	Walk-on; transferred to Lipscomb
George Fant	44	F	6'6"	250	Senior	Bowling Green, KY	Graduated
T. J. Price	52	G	6'4"	223	Senior	Slidell, LA	Graduated

=== Incoming transfers ===
Name	Number	Pos.	Height	Weight	Year	Hometown	Previous School
Aaron Cosby	2	G	6'3"	205	RS Senior	Louisville, KY	Transferred from Illinois. Cosby will be eligible to play immediately since Cosby graduated from Illinois.
Phabian Glasco	13	F	6'7"	225	Junior	Tulsa, OK	Junior college transferred from Connors State College
Willie Carmichael III	24	F	6'8"	210	Sophomore	Apopka, FL	Transferred from Tennessee. Under NCAA transfer rules, Carmichael III will have to sit out for the 2015–16 season. Will have three years of remaining eligibility.
Frederick Edmond	25	G	6'4"	190	Junior	Lansing, MI	Junior college transferred from College of Southern Idaho
Anton Waters	42	F	6'6"	205	Junior	Baltimore, MD	Junior college transferred from Gulf Coast State College

== Class of 2015 recruits ==
College recruiting information
Name	Hometown	School	Height	Weight	Commit date
Chris McNeal; PG	Memphis, TN	South Side High School	5 ft 11 in (1.80 m)	165 lb (75 kg)	Jul 7, 2014
Chris McNeal; PG	Recruit ratings: Scout: Rivals: (NR)				
Marlon Hunter Jr. SG	Memphis, TN	Houston High School	6 ft 2 in (1.88 m)	180 lb (82 kg)	Nov 6, 2014
Marlon Hunter Jr. SG	Recruit ratings: Scout: Rivals: (NR)				
Kristaps Gluditis; PG	Riga, Latvia	Get Better Academy	6 ft 4 in (1.93 m)	180 lb (82 kg)	Apr 28, 2015
Kristaps Gluditis; PG	Recruit ratings: Scout: Rivals: (NR)				
Nathan Smith; C	London, England	Get Better Academy	7 ft 1 in (2.16 m)	220 lb (100 kg)	
Nathan Smith; C	Recruit ratings: Scout: Rivals: (NR)				
Overall recruit ranking:
Note: In many cases, Scout, Rivals, 247Sports, On3, and ESPN may conflict in their listings of height and weight.; In these cases, the average was taken. ESPN grades are on a 100-point scale.; Sources: "2015 Team Ranking". Rivals.

== Roster ==
2015–16 Western Kentucky Hilltoppers men's basketball team
Players
Coaches

Pos.	#	Name	Height	Weight	Year	Hometown
G	1	Chris McNeal	6 ft 0 in (1.83 m)	195 lb (88 kg)	Fr	Jackson, Tennessee
G	2	Aaron Cosby	6 ft 3 in (1.91 m)	200 lb (91 kg)	RS Sr	Louisville, Kentucky
G	3	Marlon Hunter	6 ft 2 in (1.88 m)	195 lb (88 kg)	Fr	Memphis, Tennessee
F	13	Phabian Glasco	6 ft 7 in (2.01 m)	230 lb (104 kg)	Jr	Tulsa, Oklahoma
F	14	Benjamin Lawson	7 ft 1 in (2.16 m)	230 lb (104 kg)	Jr	Hitchin, England
G	15	Dylan Sanford (W)	6 ft 1 in (1.85 m)	180 lb (82 kg)	Fr	Owensboro, Kentucky
C	20	Aleksej Rostov	6 ft 10 in (2.08 m)	240 lb (109 kg)	Sr	Riga, Latvia
F	21	Nigel Snipes	6 ft 6 in (1.98 m)	220 lb (100 kg)	RS Sr	Marietta, Georgia
C	22	Nathan Smith	7 ft 2 in (2.18 m)	240 lb (109 kg)	Fr	London, England
F	23	Justin Johnson	6 ft 7 in (2.01 m)	235 lb (107 kg)	So	Hazard, Kentucky
F	24	Willie Carmichael (I) (redshirt)	6 ft 8 in (2.03 m)	210 lb (95 kg)	So	Apopka, Florida
G	25	Fredrick Edmond	6 ft 4 in (1.93 m)	205 lb (93 kg)	Jr	Lansing, Michigan
G	32	Keifer Dalton (W)	5 ft 11 in (1.8 m)	165 lb (75 kg)	Fr	Albany, Kentucky
F	42	Anton Waters	6 ft 7 in (2.01 m)	245 lb (111 kg)	Jr	Baltimore, Maryland
G	51	Chris Harrison-Docks	6 ft 0 in (1.83 m)	175 lb (79 kg)	RS Jr	Okemos, Michigan

Head coach

- Ray Harper (Kentucky Wesleyan)

Assistant coach(es)

- Lawrence Brenneman (Geneva)
- David Boyden (Western Kentucky)
- Shawn Forrest (Arkansas–Pine Bluff)

Legend

- (C) Team captain
- (S) Suspended
- (I) Ineligible
- (W) Walk-on
- Injured
- Current redshirt

Roster

== Schedule ==
Date time, TV	Rank^{#}	Opponent^{#}	Result	Record	Site (attendance) city, state
Exhibition
11/02/2015*; 7:00 pm		Lindsey Wilson	W 84–71		E. A. Diddle Arena (2,881); Bowling Green, KY
11/06/2015*; 7:00 pm		Kentucky Wesleyan	W 75–68		E. A. Diddle Arena (3,207); Bowling Green, KY
Non-conference regular season
11/14/2015*; 7:00 pm		Campbellsville; Gulf Coast Showcase Opening Round	W 97–77	1–0	E. A. Diddle Arena (3,424); Bowling Green, KY
11/18/2015*; 6:00 pm, ASN		at Belmont	L 85–90	1–1	Curb Event Center (3,253); Nashville, TN
11/21/2015*; 12:00 pm, FCS/WKYU		Stony Brook	W 67–66	2–1	E. A. Diddle Arena (3,684); Bowling Green, KY
11/23/2015*; 5:00 pm		vs. Drake; Gulf Coast Showcase quarterfinals	L 79–81 ^{OT}	2–2	Germain Arena (523); Estero, FL
11/24/2015*; 1:30 pm		vs. Central Michigan; Gulf Coast Showcase consolation round	W 88–60	3–2	Germain Arena (823); Estero, FL
11/25/2015*; 2:30 pm		vs. Duquesne; Gulf Coast Showcase 5th place game	L 73–81	3–3	Germain Arena (1,077); Estero, FL
12/01/2015*; 7:00 pm, FCS/WKYU		Eastern Kentucky	W 86–84	4–3	E. A. Diddle Arena (4,026); Bowling Green, KY
12/05/2015*; 7:30 pm, FS1		at No. 12 Xavier	L 64–95	4–4	Cintas Center (10,250); Cincinnati, OH
12/13/2015*; 2:00 pm, ASN		Indiana State	W 75–62	5–4	E. A. Diddle Arena (2,810); Bowling Green, KY
12/16/2015*; 8:00 pm, FCS/WKYU		Alabama A&M	W 79–70	6–4	E. A. Diddle Arena (3,109); Bowling Green, KY
12/19/2015*; 11:00 am, ESPNU		at No. 19 Louisville	L 56–78	6–5	KFC Yum! Center (21,606); Louisville, KY
12/22/2015*; 8:00 pm, ASN		Detroit	W 79–74	7–5	E. A. Diddle Arena (3,031); Bowling Green, KY
12/28/2015*; 7:00 pm		Brescia	W 93–66	8–5	E. A. Diddle Arena (3,388); Bowling Green, KY
Conference USA regular season
01/03/2016; 12:00 pm, ASN		at Marshall	L 76–94	8–6 (0–1)	Cam Henderson Center (4,623); Huntington, WV
01/07/2016; 7:00 pm, FCS/WKYU		FIU	L 72–75	8–7 (0–2)	E. A. Diddle Arena (3,394); Bowling Green, KY
01/09/2016; 2:00 pm, FCS/WKYU		Florida Atlantic	W 86–82 ^{OT}	9–7 (1–2)	E. A. Diddle Arena (3,607); Bowling Green, KY
01/14/2016; 7:00 pm, ASN		at Rice	L 73–83	9–8 (1–3)	Tudor Fieldhouse (1,664); Houston, TX
01/16/2016; 7:00 pm		at North Texas	W 81–76	10–8 (2–3)	The Super Pit (1,903); Denton, TX
01/21/2016; 6:00 pm, ASN		at Old Dominion	L 62–68	10–9 (2–4)	Ted Constant Convocation Center (6,535); Norfolk, VA
01/23/2016; 6:00 pm, FCS/WKYU		at Charlotte	L 71–88	10–10 (2–5)	Dale F. Halton Arena (4,197); Charlotte, NC
01/28/2016; 6:30 pm, FS1		UAB	W 69–62	11–10 (3–5)	E. A. Diddle Arena (3,892); Bowling Green, KY
01/30/2016; 7:00 pm, FCS/WKYU		Middle Tennessee	L 64–66	11–11 (3–6)	E. A. Diddle Arena (5,259); Bowling Green, KY
02/04/2016; 7:00 pm		at UTSA	W 83–71	12–11 (4–6)	Convocation Center (1,003); San Antonio, TX
02/06/2016; 4:00 pm, FS1		at UTEP	L 89–93 ^{OT}	12–12 (4–7)	Don Haskins Center (12,000); El Paso, TX
02/13/2016; 7:00 pm, FCS/WKYU		Marshall	L 93–96 ^{OT}	12–13 (4–8)	E. A. Diddle Arena (4,373); Bowling Green, KY
02/18/2016; 7:00 pm, FCS/WKYU		Old Dominion	L 56–59	12–14 (4–9)	E. A. Diddle Arena (3,182); Bowling Green, KY
02/20/2016; 2:00 pm, FCS/WKYU		Charlotte	W 59–54	13–14 (5–9)	E. A. Diddle Arena (3,570); Bowling Green, KY
02/25/2016; 6:00 pm, ASN		at Middle Tennessee	W 78–72	14–14 (6–9)	Murphy Center (4,333); Murfreesboro, TN
02/27/2016; 11:00 am, FSN		at UAB	L 67–71	14–15 (6–10)	Bartow Arena (7,510); Birmingham, AL
03/03/2016; 8:00 pm, ASN		Southern Miss	W 75–60	15–15 (7–10)	E. A. Diddle Arena (3,405); Bowling Green, KY
03/05/2016; 7:00 pm, FCS/WKYU		Louisiana Tech	W 96–90 ^{OT}	16–15 (8–10)	E. A. Diddle Arena (4,591); Bowling Green, KY
Conference USA Tournament
03/09/2016; 12:00 pm, ASN	(8)	vs. (9) North Texas; Second round	W 84–76	17–15	Legacy Arena (3,888); Birmingham, AL
03/10/2016; 12:00 pm, ASN	(8)	vs. (1) UAB; Quarterfinals	W 88–77	18–15	Legacy Arena (9,797); Birmingham, AL
03/11/2016; 3:00 pm, CBSSN	(8)	vs. (5) Old Dominion; Semifinals	L 77–89	18–16	Legacy Arena (6,176); Birmingham, AL
*Non-conference game. ^{#}Rankings from AP Poll. (#) Tournament seedings in parentheses. All times are in Central Time.

== See also ==
- 2015–16 WKU Lady Toppers basketball team
