= 2016 Conference USA men's basketball tournament =

- Classification: Division I
- Season: 2015–16
- Teams: 13
- Site: Legacy Arena; Birmingham, Alabama
- Champions: Middle Tennessee (1st title)
- Winning coach: Kermit Davis (1st title)
- MVP: Reggie Upshaw (Middle Tennessee)
- Attendance: 33,438
- Television: ASN, CBSSN, FS1

2015–16 Conference USA men's basketball standings
	Conf.				Overall
Team	W		L	PCT	W		L	PCT
UAB	16	–	2	.889	26	–	7	.788
Middle Tennessee †	13	–	5	.722	25	–	10	.714
Marshall	12	–	6	.667	17	–	16	.515
Louisiana Tech	12	–	6	.667	23	–	10	.697
Old Dominion	12	–	6	.667	25	–	13	.658
UTEP	10	–	8	.556	19	–	14	.576
Charlotte	9	–	9	.500	14	–	19	.424
Western Kentucky	8	–	10	.444	18	–	16	.529
North Texas	7	–	11	.389	12	–	20	.375
Rice	7	–	11	.389	12	–	20	.375
FIU	7	–	11	.389	13	–	19	.406
Florida Atlantic	5	–	13	.278	8	–	25	.242
Southern Miss*	5	–	13	.278	8	–	21	.276
UTSA	3	–	15	.167	5	–	27	.156
† 2016 C-USA Tournament winner *Ineligible for postseason play due to self-imposed postseason ban.

The 2016 Conference USA men's basketball tournament was held from March 8–12, 2016, in Birmingham, Alabama, at Legacy Arena. Southern Miss did not participate in the tournament due to a self-imposed a postseason ban for pending NCAA violations. Middle Tennessee won the tournament, receiving the conference's automatic bid to the NCAA tournament.

== Seeds ==
Only 13 conference teams were eligible for the tournament. As a result, the top 11 teams received a bye to the Second Round of the tournament. The top 4 teams received a double bye to the Quarterfinals of the tournament.

Teams were seeded by record within the conference, with a tiebreaker system to seed teams with identical conference records.

Seed	School	Conference	Tiebreaker
1	UAB	16–2	
2	Middle Tennessee	13–5	
3	Marshall	12–6	2–1 vs. LA Tech & Old Dominion
4	Louisiana Tech	12–6	1–1 vs. Marshall & Old Dominion
5	Old Dominion	12–6	1–2 vs. LA Tech & Marshall
6	UTEP	10–8	
7	Charlotte	9–9	
8	Western Kentucky	8–10	
9	North Texas	7–11	2–1 vs. Rice & FIU, 1-1 vs. Louisiana Tech
10	Rice	7–11	2–1 vs. North Texas & FIU, 0-2 vs. Louisiana Tech
11	FIU	7–11	0–2 vs. Rice & North Texas
12	Florida Atlantic	5–13	
13	UTSA	3–15	

== Schedule ==
Game	Time*	Matchup^{#}	Final Score	Television	Attendance
First round – Tuesday, March 8
1	4:00 pm	#12 Florida Atlantic vs. #13 UTSA	82–58	ASN	220
Second round – Wednesday, March 9
2	12:00 pm	#8 Western Kentucky vs. #9 North Texas	84–76	ASN	3,888
3	2:30 pm	#5 Old Dominion vs. #12 Florida Atlantic	72–46	ASN	3,888
4	6:00 pm	#7 Charlotte vs. #10 Rice	79–69	ASN	3,905
5	8:30 pm	#6 UTEP vs. #11 FIU	85–77	ASN	3,905
Quarterfinals – Thursday, March 10
6	12:00 pm	#1 UAB vs. #8 Western Kentucky	77–88	ASN	9,797
7	2:30 pm	#4 La Tech vs. #5 Old Dominion	52–68	ASN	9,797
8	6:00 pm	#2 Middle Tennessee vs. #7 Charlotte	79–61	ASN	3,933
9	8:30 pm	#3 Marshall vs #6 UTEP	87–85	ASN	3,933
Semifinals – Friday, March 11
10	3:00 pm	#5 Old Dominion vs #8 Western Kentucky	89–77	CBSSN	6,176
11	5:30 pm	#2 Middle Tennessee vs #3 Marshall	99–90	CBSSN	6,176
Championship – Saturday, March 12
12	1:30 pm	#2 Middle Tennessee vs #5 Old Dominion	55–53	FS1	5,519
*Game times in CT. #-Rankings denote tournament seed

== Bracket ==
First round Tuesday, March 8 ASN
13	UTSA	58
12	Florida Atlantic	82

Second round Wednesday, March 9 ASN
9	North Texas	76
8	Western Kentucky	84
12	Florida Atlantic	46
5	Old Dominion	72
10	Rice	69
7	Charlotte	79
11	FIU	77
6	UTEP	85

Quarterfinals; Thursday, March 10; ASN
8	Western Kentucky	88
1	UAB	77
5	Old Dominion	68
4	Louisiana Tech	52
7	Charlotte	61
2	Middle Tennessee	79
6	UTEP	85
3	Marshall	87

Semifinals; Friday, March 11; CBSSN
8	Western Kentucky	77
5	Old Dominion	89
2	Middle Tennessee	99
3	Marshall	90

Championship; Saturday, March 12; FS1
5	Old Dominion	53
2	Middle Tennessee	55

== See also ==
- 2016 Conference USA women's basketball tournament
