= 2015–16 North Texas Mean Green men's basketball team =

American college basketball season

2015–16 North Texas Mean Green men's basketball
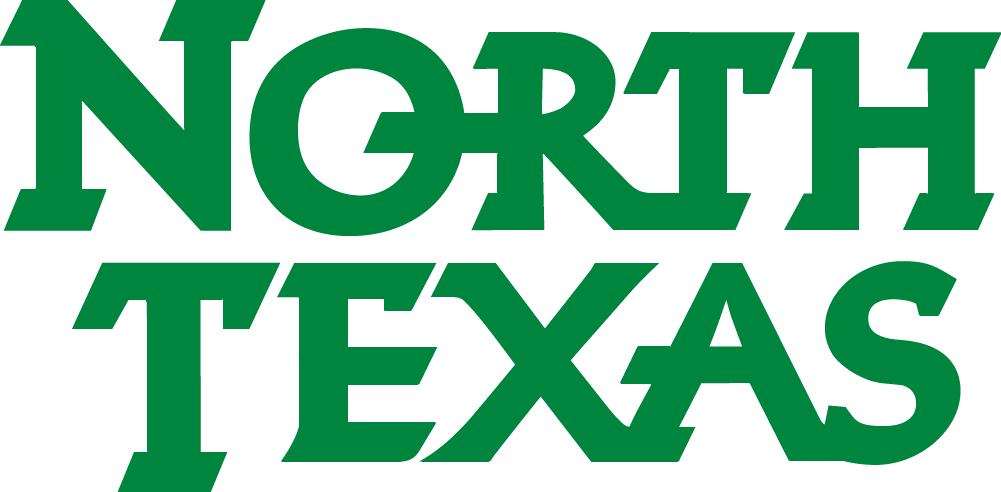
- Conference: Conference USA
- Record: 12–20 (7–11 C-USA)
- Head coach: Tony Benford (4th season)
- Assistant coaches: Rob Evans; David Anwar; Scott Monarch
- Home arena: UNT Coliseum (Capacity: 10,040)

2015–16 Conference USA men's basketball standings
| | Conf. | | | | Overall |
| Team | W | | L | PCT | W | | L | PCT |
|---|---|---|---|---|---|---|---|---|
| UAB | 16 | – | 2 | .889 | 26 | – | 7 | .788 |
| Middle Tennessee † | 13 | – | 5 | .722 | 25 | – | 10 | .714 |
| Marshall | 12 | – | 6 | .667 | 17 | – | 16 | .515 |
| Louisiana Tech | 12 | – | 6 | .667 | 23 | – | 10 | .697 |
| Old Dominion | 12 | – | 6 | .667 | 25 | – | 13 | .658 |
| UTEP | 10 | – | 8 | .556 | 19 | – | 14 | .576 |
| Charlotte | 9 | – | 9 | .500 | 14 | – | 19 | .424 |
| Western Kentucky | 8 | – | 10 | .444 | 18 | – | 16 | .529 |
| North Texas | 7 | – | 11 | .389 | 12 | – | 20 | .375 |
| Rice | 7 | – | 11 | .389 | 12 | – | 20 | .375 |
| FIU | 7 | – | 11 | .389 | 13 | – | 19 | .406 |
| Florida Atlantic | 5 | – | 13 | .278 | 8 | – | 25 | .242 |
| Southern Miss* | 5 | – | 13 | .278 | 8 | – | 21 | .276 |
| UTSA | 3 | – | 15 | .167 | 5 | – | 27 | .156 |
† 2016 C-USA Tournament winner *Ineligible for postseason play due to self-imposed postseason ban.

The 2015–16 North Texas Mean Green men's basketball team represented the University of North Texas during the 2015–16 NCAA Division I men's basketball season. The Mean Green, led by fourth-year head coach Tony Benford, played their home games at UNT Coliseum, nicknamed The Super Pit, and were members of Conference USA. They finished the season 12–20, 7–11 in C-USA play to finish in a three-way tie for ninth place. They lost in the second round of the C-USA tournament to WKU.

== Previous season ==
The Mean Green finished the 2014–15 season 14–17, 8–10 in C-USA play in a 4 way tie for seventh place. They lost in the first round of the C-USA tournament to Rice.

== Departures ==
| Name | Number | Pos. | Height | Weight | Year | Hometown | Notes |
|---|---|---|---|---|---|---|---|
| Maurice Aniefiok | 1 | G/F | 6'5" | 212 | RS Junior | Lagos, Nigeria | Left the team for personal reasons |
| Muhammed Ahmed | 20 | F | 6'7" | 215 | Junior | Bronx, NY | Transferred to Bridgeport |
| T. J. Taylor | 21 | G | 6'3" | 215 | RS Senior | Denison, TX | Graduated |
| Grey Wesley | 22 | F | 6'7" | 190 | RS Freshman | Arlington, TX | Left the team for personal reasons |
| Jordan Williams | 23 | G | 6'6" | 202 | Senior | Dallas, TX | Graduated |
| Armani Flannigan | 25 | F | 6'8" | 200 | Senior | Rockford, IL | Graduated |
| Colin Voss | 33 | F | 6'7" | 240 | RS Senior | Grand Rapids, MI | Graduated |

=== Incoming transfers ===
| Name | Number | Pos. | Height | Weight | Year | Hometown | Previous School |
|---|---|---|---|---|---|---|---|
| Deckie Johnson | 10 | G | 6'3" | 180 | Junior | Memphis, TN | Junior college transferred from Angelina College |
| Michael Thomas | 14 | C | 6'11" | 225 | Junior | Ville Platte, LA | Junior college from Kilgore College |
| Eric Katenda | 20 | F | 6'9" | 230 | Senior | Paris, France | Transferred from Notre Dame. Will be eligible to play immediately since Katenda graduated from Notre Dame. |

== Recruiting class of 2015 ==
College recruiting information
| Name | Hometown | School | Height | Weight | Commit date |
|---|---|---|---|---|---|
| Rickey Brice; C | Dallas, TX | Pantego Christian Academy | 7 ft 0 in (2.13 m) | 260 lb (120 kg) | Oct 28, 2014 |
| Rickey Brice; C | Recruit ratings: Scout: Rivals: (78) | | | | |
| Allante Holston; SF | Washington, D.C. | West Oaks Academy | 6 ft 6 in (1.98 m) | 175 lb (79 kg) | |
| Allante Holston; SF | Recruit ratings: Scout: Rivals: (60) | | | | |
| Ja'Michael Brown; PG | San Antonio, TX | Pro-Vision Academy | 6 ft 1 in (1.85 m) | 195 lb (88 kg) | Sep 13, 2014 |
| Ja'Michael Brown; PG | Recruit ratings: Scout: Rivals: (NR) | | | | |
Overall recruit ranking:
Note: In many cases, Scout, Rivals, 247Sports, On3, and ESPN may conflict in their listings of height and weight.; In these cases, the average was taken. ESPN grades are on a 100-point scale.; Sources: "2015 Team Ranking". Rivals.

== Roster ==
2015–16 North Texas Mean Green men's basketball team
Players
Coaches

| Pos. | # | Name | Height | Weight | Year | Previous school | Hometown |
|---|---|---|---|---|---|---|---|
| G | 0 | Carrington Ward | 6 ft 2 in (1.88 m) | 180 lb (82 kg) | RS Jr | San Jacinto College | Philadelphia, PA |
| G | 2 | Greg White-Pittman | 6 ft 2 in (1.88 m) | 215 lb (98 kg) | So | Holy Cross HS | New Orleans, LA |
| G | 3 | Ja'Michael Brown | 6 ft 1 in (1.85 m) | 185 lb (84 kg) | Fr | Pro-Vision Academy | Raceland, LA |
| G | 5 | Allante Holston | 6 ft 7 in (2.01 m) | 185 lb (84 kg) | Fr | Clinton Christian School | Capitol Heights, MD |
| G | 10 | Deckie Johnson | 6 ft 3 in (1.91 m) | 175 lb (79 kg) | Jr | Angelina College | Memphis, TN |
| F | 11 | Jeremy Combs | 6 ft 7 in (2.01 m) | 196 lb (89 kg) | So | Carter HS | Dallas, TX |
| G | 12 | Chris Campbell | 6 ft 3 in (1.91 m) | 180 lb (82 kg) | Sr | Jacksonville College | Houston, TX |
| C | 14 | Mike Thomas | 6 ft 11 in (2.11 m) | 225 lb (102 kg) | Jr | Kilgore College | Ville Platte, LA |
| G | 15 | DeAndre Harris | 6 ft 3 in (1.91 m) | 191 lb (87 kg) | RS Jr | Tyler JC | Milwaukee, WI |
| F | 20 | Eric Katenda | 6 ft 9 in (2.06 m) | 240 lb (109 kg) | Sr | Notre Dame | Paris, France |
| F | 22 | Khalil Fuller | 6 ft 8 in (2.03 m) | 266 lb (121 kg) | Fr | Rancho Verde HS | Moreno Valley, CA |
| C | 23 | Rickey Brice, Jr. | 7 ft 0 in (2.13 m) | 278 lb (126 kg) | Fr | Pantego Christian HS | Arlington, TX |
| G | 24 | Jacob Gross | 6 ft 4 in (1.93 m) | 177 lb (80 kg) | RS So | Sachse HS | Sachse, TX |
| G | 30 | Todd Eaglin | 5 ft 11 in (1.8 m) | 180 lb (82 kg) | Sr | Tyler JC | The Woodlands, TX |
| G | 52 | J-Mychal Reese | 6 ft 2 in (1.88 m) | 180 lb (82 kg) | RS Jr | Texas A&M | Bryan, TX |
| G | 55 | D. J. Draper | 5 ft 10 in (1.78 m) | 150 lb (68 kg) | Fr | Birdville HS | Beford, TX |

Head coach

- Tony Benford (New Mexico)

Assistant coach(es)

- Rob Evans (New Mexico State)
- David Anwar (Fitchburg State)
- Scott Monarch (Mississippi Valley State)

Legend

- (C) Team captain
- (S) Suspended
- (I) Ineligible
- (W) Walk-on
- Injured
- Current redshirt

Roster

== Schedule ==
| Date time, TV | Rank^{#} | Opponent^{#} | Result | Record | Site (attendance) city, state |
Non-conference regular season
| November 13, 2015*; 7:30 pm | | Jarvis Christian | W 112–82 | 1–0 | UNT Coliseum (2,230); Denton, TX |
| November 16, 2015*; 7:00 pm | | Texas College | W 110–61 | 2–0 | UNT Coliseum (1,276); Denton, TX |
| November 23, 2015*; 7:30 pm | | Idaho; Mean Green Showcase | L 63–65 | 2–1 | UNT Coliseum (1,756); Denton, TX |
| November 24, 2015*; 7:30 pm | | Samford; Mean Green Showcase | L 72–74 | 2–2 | UNT Coliseum (1,646); Denton, TX |
| November 25, 2015*; 4:30 pm | | Troy; Mean Green Showcase | L 74–86 | 2–3 | UNT Coliseum (1,626); Denton, TX |
| November 30, 2015*; 7:00 pm | | at Northern Iowa | L 70–93 | 2–4 | McLeod Center (4,849); Cedar Falls, IA |
| December 2, 2015*; 7:00 pm | | at Texas–Arlington | L 67–90 | 2–5 | College Park Center (6,107); Arlington, TX |
| December 5, 2015*; 5:00 pm | | Southern Illinois | L 63–95 | 2–6 | UNT Coliseum (2,475); Denton, TX |
| December 12, 2015*; 7:05 pm, ESPN3 | | at Southern Illinois | L 66–74 | 2–7 | SIU Arena (4,839); Carbondale, IL |
| December 14, 2015*; 7:00 pm, ASN | | Nicholls State | W 78–60 | 3–7 | UNT Coliseum (1,282); Denton, TX |
| December 17, 2015*; 11:30 am | | Mississippi Valley State | W 87–74 | 4–7 | UNT Coliseum (2,180); Denton, TX |
| December 21, 2015*; 8:00 pm, FS1 | | at Creighton | L 82–105 | 4–8 | CenturyLink Center (17,518); Omaha, NE |
| December 29, 2015*; 8:00 pm | | Sam Houston State | W 69–64 | 5–8 | UNT Coliseum (1,906); Denton, TX |
Conference USA regular season
| January 1, 2016; 6:00 pm, ASN | | at UTSA | W 70–66 | 6–8 (1–0) | Convocation Center (829); San Antonio, TX |
| January 3, 2016; 4:00 pm, ASN | | at UTEP | L 75–84 | 6–9 (1–1) | Don Haskins Center (6,585); El Paso, TX |
| January 9, 2016; 1:00 pm, ASN | | Rice | W 85–74 | 7–9 (2–1) | UNT Coliseum (1,886); Denton, TX |
| January 14, 2016; 7:00 pm | | Marshall | L 78–97 | 7–10 (2–2) | UNT Coliseum (1,585); Denton, TX |
| January 16, 2016; 7:00 pm | | WKU | L 76–81 | 7–11 (2–3) | UNT Coliseum (1,903); Denton, TX |
| January 21, 2016; 6:30 pm | | at Middle Tennessee | L 64–86 | 7–12 (2–4) | Murphy Center (3,826); Murfreesboro, TN |
| January 23, 2016; 7:00 pm | | at UAB | L 57–78 | 7–13 (2–5) | Bartow Arena (6,835); Birmingham, AL |
| January 30, 2016; 7:00 pm | | at Rice | L 87–95 | 7–14 (2–6) | Tudor Fieldhouse (2,515); Houston, TX |
| February 4, 2016; 7:00 pm | | Southern Miss | W 70–53 | 8–14 (3–6) | UNT Coliseum (1,607); Denton, TX |
| February 6, 2016; 3:00 pm | | Louisiana Tech | W 80–69 | 9–14 (4–6) | UNT Coliseum (4,610); Denton, TX |
| February 11, 2016; 6:00 pm, ASN | | at Old Dominion | L 47–67 | 9–15 (4–7) | Ted Constant Convocation Center (6,250); Norfolk, VA |
| February 13, 2016; 3:00 pm, ASN | | at Charlotte | L 79–103 | 9–16 (4–8) | Dale F. Halton Arena (4,444); Charlotte, NC |
| February 18, 2016; 7:00 pm | | FIU | W 77–75 | 10–16 (5–8) | UNT Coliseum (2,156); Denton, TX |
| February 20, 2016; 7:00 pm | | Florida Atlantic | W 70–62 | 11–16 (6–8) | UNT Coliseum (1,466); Denton, TX |
| February 25, 2016; 6:30 pm, ASN | | at Louisiana Tech | L 62–73 | 11–17 (6–9) | Thomas Assembly Center (3,092); Ruston, LA |
| February 27, 2016; 7:00 pm | | at Southern Miss | L 70–81 | 11–18 (6–10) | Reed Green Coliseum (3,693); Hattiesburg, MS |
| March 3, 2016; 7:00 pm | | Old Dominion | L 70–76 | 11–19 (6–11) | UNT Coliseum (1,878); Denton, TX |
| March 5, 2016; 7:00 pm | | Charlotte | W 80–77 | 12–19 (7–11) | UNT Coliseum (2,156); Denton, TX |
Conference USA tournament
| March 9, 2016; 12:00 pm, ASN | (9) | vs. (8) WKU; Second round | L 76–84 | 12–20 | Legacy Arena (3,888); Birmingham, AL |
*Non-conference game. (#) Tournament seedings in parentheses. All times are in Central Time.

== See also ==
- 2015–16 North Texas Mean Green women's basketball team
