= 2015–16 UTSA Roadrunners men's basketball team =

American college basketball season

2015–16 UTSA Roadrunners men's basketball
- Conference: Conference USA
- Record: 5-27 (3-15 C-USA)
- Head coach: Brooks Thompson (10th season)
- Assistant coaches: Dan O'Dowd; Robert Guster; Shenton Wai
- Home arena: Convocation Center

2015–16 Conference USA men's basketball standings
	Conf.				Overall
Team	W		L	PCT	W		L	PCT
UAB	16	–	2	.889	26	–	7	.788
Middle Tennessee †	13	–	5	.722	25	–	10	.714
Marshall	12	–	6	.667	17	–	16	.515
Louisiana Tech	12	–	6	.667	23	–	10	.697
Old Dominion	12	–	6	.667	25	–	13	.658
UTEP	10	–	8	.556	19	–	14	.576
Charlotte	9	–	9	.500	14	–	19	.424
Western Kentucky	8	–	10	.444	18	–	16	.529
North Texas	7	–	11	.389	12	–	20	.375
Rice	7	–	11	.389	12	–	20	.375
FIU	7	–	11	.389	13	–	19	.406
Florida Atlantic	5	–	13	.278	8	–	25	.242
Southern Miss*	5	–	13	.278	8	–	21	.276
UTSA	3	–	15	.167	5	–	27	.156
† 2016 C-USA Tournament winner *Ineligible for postseason play due to self-imposed postseason ban.

The 2015–16 UTSA Roadrunners men's basketball team represented the University of Texas at San Antonio during the 2015–16 NCAA Division I men's basketball season. The Roadrunners, led by tenth-year head coach Brooks Thompson, played their home games at the Convocation Center and were members of Conference USA. They finished the season 5-27, 3-15 in C-USA play to finish in last place. They lost in the first round of the C-USA tournament to Florida Atlantic.

On March 10, 2016, head coach Brooks Thompson was fired. He finished at UTSA with a 10-year record of 130–176. On April 1, the school hired Steven Hensen as head coach.

== Previous season ==
The Roadrunners finished the 2014–15 season 14–16, 8–10 in C-USA play in a 4-way tie for 7th place. They lost in the first round of the C-USA tournament to FIU.

== Departures ==
Name	Number	Pos.	Height	Weight	Year	Hometown	Notes
James Williams	0	G	6'4"	190	Junior	Arlington, TX	Left the team for personal reasons
Edwin Olympio	3	G	6'4"	185	Freshman	Marseille, France	Transferred to Arkansas–Fort Smith
Tyler Flores	5	G	6'4"	220	Freshman	Saginaw, TX	Left the team for personal reasons
Jeromie Hill	12	F	6'8"	250	Senior	Cairns, Australia	Graduated
Larry Lewis, Jr.	34	G	6'2"	175	RS Freshman	Scottsdale, AZ	Transferred to Odessa College
Keon Lewis	44	G	6'2"	180	Senior	Seattle, WA	Graduated
Kaj-Björn Sherman	45	C	7'0"	250	Senior	Mercer Island, WA	Graduated

=== Incoming transfers ===
Name	Number	Pos.	Height	Weight	Year	Hometown	Previous School
James Harris, Jr.	2	G	6'4"	185	Junior	Baton Rouge, LA	Junior college transferred from Indian Hills Community College
Nick Billingsley	34	G	6'4"	175	Junior	Omaha, NE	Junior college transferred from New Mexico Junior College

== Class of 2015 recruits ==
College recruiting information
Name	Hometown	School	Height	Weight	Commit date
Garrett Thibodeaux; SF	Tyler, TX	Robert E. Lee High School	6 ft 8 in (2.03 m)	220 lb (100 kg)	
Garrett Thibodeaux; SF	Recruit ratings: Scout: Rivals: (NR)				
A.J. Cockrell; PF	Tulsa, OK	Memorial High School	6 ft 8 in (2.03 m)	200 lb (91 kg)	Nov 3, 2014
A.J. Cockrell; PF	Recruit ratings: Scout: Rivals: (NR)				
Nick Allen; SF	Surprise, AZ	Willow Canyon High School	6 ft 7 in (2.01 m)	205 lb (93 kg)	Nov 18, 2014
Nick Allen; SF	Recruit ratings: Scout: Rivals: (NR)				
Overall recruit ranking:
Note: In many cases, Scout, Rivals, 247Sports, On3, and ESPN may conflict in their listings of height and weight.; In these cases, the average was taken. ESPN grades are on a 100-point scale.; Sources: "2015 Team Ranking". Rivals.

== Roster ==
2015–16 UTSA Roadrunners men's basketball team
Players
Coaches

Pos.	#	Name	Height	Weight	Year	Previous school	Hometown
F	0	Terrell Scruggs (W)	6 ft 6 in (1.98 m)	215 lb (98 kg)	Jr	Grand View HS	Fresno, TX
G	1	George Matthews	6 ft 6 in (1.98 m)	220 lb (100 kg)	RS Sr	Utah	Phoenix, AZ
G	2	J. R. Harris	6 ft 4 in (1.93 m)	170 lb (77 kg)	Jr	Indian Hills CC	Baton Rouge, LA
G	3	Gino Littles (W)	6 ft 0 in (1.83 m)	150 lb (68 kg)	So	Desert Mountain HS	Phoenix, AZ
G	5	Ömer Alp Aksu	6 ft 2 in (1.88 m)	180 lb (82 kg)	Fr	İzmir American Collegiate Institute	Istanbul, Turkey
G	10	Christian Wilson	6 ft 2 in (1.88 m)	150 lb (68 kg)	So	Notre Dame Prep	Baton Rouge, LA
G	11	Austin Karrer	6 ft 3 in (1.91 m)	175 lb (79 kg)	So	Canyon HS	New Braunfels, TX
C	15	Lucas O'Brien	6 ft 10 in (2.08 m)	230 lb (104 kg)	Sr	Perry HS	Chandler, AZ
F	22	Garrett Thibodeaux	6 ft 8 in (2.03 m)	220 lb (100 kg)	Fr	Lee HS	Tyler, TX
F	24	Phillip Jones	6 ft 6 in (1.98 m)	205 lb (93 kg)	Jr	Pine Woods HS	Freeport, Bahamas
F	25	Nick Allen	6 ft 7 in (2.01 m)	205 lb (93 kg)	Fr	Willow Canyon HS	Surprise, AZ
C	32	James Ringholt	6 ft 10 in (2.08 m)	215 lb (98 kg)	So	Brisbane Boys' College	Rockhampton, Australia
F	33	A. J. Cockrell	6 ft 8 in (2.03 m)	215 lb (98 kg)	Fr	Memorial HS	Tulsa, OK
G	34	Nick Billingsley	6 ft 4 in (1.93 m)	185 lb (84 kg)	Jr	New Mexico JC	Omaha, NE

Head coach

- Brooks Thompson (Oklahoma State)

Assistant coach(es)

- Dan O'Dowd (Bethany (KS))
- Robert Guster (Missouri S&T)
- Shenton Wai (Victoria)

Legend

- (C) Team captain
- (S) Suspended
- (I) Ineligible
- (W) Walk-on
- Injured
- Current redshirt

Roster

== Schedule ==
Date time, TV	Opponent	Result	Record	Site (attendance) city, state
Exhibition
11/05/2015*; 7:00 pm	Southeastern Oklahoma State	W 92–81		Convocation Center (762); San Antonio, TX
Non-conference regular season
11/13/2015*; 7:00 pm, ESPN3	at Loyola–Chicago	L 64–76	0–1	Joseph J. Gentile Arena (1,711); Chicago, IL
11/15/2015*; 1:00 pm, ESPN3	at Clemson; Men Who Speak Up Main Event	L 45–78	0–2	Bon Secours Wellness Arena (6,262); Greenville, SC
11/17/2015*; 7:00 pm, FS2	at Creighton; Men Who Speak Up Main Event	L 78–103	0–3	CenturyLink Center (16,580); Omaha, NE
11/21/2015*; 9:00 pm	at Southern Utah	W 82–79	1–3	Centrum Arena (3,256); Cedar City, UT
11/23/2015*; 2:30 pm	vs. Central Arkansas; Men Who Speak Up Main Event Middleweight semifinals	L 84–94	1–4	MGM Grand Garden Arena (323); Paradise, NV
11/25/2015*; 2:30 pm	vs. Texas Southern; Men Who Speak Up Main Event Middleweight 3rd place	L 80–91	1–5	MGM Grand Garden Arena (217); Paradise, NV
11/29/2015*; 6:00 pm	UT Permian Basin	L 85–90	1–6	Convocation Center (707); San Antonio, TX
12/02/2015*; 7:00 pm, TWCS	at Texas State; I-35 Rivalry	L 53–76	1–7	Strahan Coliseum (3,220); San Marcos, TX
12/08/2015*; 7:00 pm, LHN	at Texas	L 50–116	1–8	Frank Erwin Center (9,657); Austin, TX
12/12/2015*; 2:00 pm, TWCS	Texas A&M–Corpus Christi	L 79–85	1–9	Convocation Center (704); San Antonio, TX
12/16/2015*; 11:30 am	East Central Oklahoma	W 75–61	2–9	Convocation Center (2,217); San Antonio, TX
12/19/2015*; 5:00 pm	Utah Valley	L 78–83	2–10	Convocation Center (1,098); San Antonio, TX
12/22/2015*; 7:00 pm	Cal Poly	L 73–88	2–11	Convocation Center (795); San Antonio, TX
Conference USA Regular season
01/01/2016; 6:00 pm, ASN	North Texas	L 66–70	2–12 (0–1)	Convocation Center (829); San Antonio, TX
01/03/2016; 3:00 pm	Rice	W 85–80	3–12 (1–1)	Convocation Center (607); San Antonio, TX
01/07/2016; 7:00 pm	at UAB	L 82–104	3–13 (1–2)	Bartow Arena (3,747); Birmingham, AL
01/09/2016; 3:00 pm, ASN	at Middle Tennessee	L 71–79	3–14 (1–3)	Murphy Center (4,632); Murfreesboro, TN
01/16/2016; 3:00 pm, ASN	UTEP	W 71–67	4–14 (2–3)	Convocation Center (1,550); San Antonio, TX
01/21/2016; 7:00 pm	FIU	L 56–72	4–15 (2–4)	Convocation Center (966); San Antonio, TX
01/23/2016; 2:00 pm	Florida Atlantic	L 71–86	4–16 (2–5)	Convocation Center (1,128); San Antonio, TX
01/28/2016; 6:30 pm	at Louisiana Tech	L 75–85	4–17 (2–6)	Thomas Assembly Center (3,428); Ruston, LA
01/30/2016; 7:00 pm	at Southern Miss	L 70–86	4–18 (2–7)	Reed Green Coliseum (3,343); Hattiesburg, MS
02/04/2016; 7:00 pm	WKU	L 71–83	4–19 (2–8)	Convocation Center (1,003); San Antonio, TX
02/06/2016; 1:00 pm, ASN	Marshall	L 91–109	4–20 (2–9)	Convocation Center (900); San Antonio, TX
02/11/2016; 6:00 pm	at Florida Atlantic	L 73–79	4–21 (2–10)	FAU Arena (933); Boca Raton, FL
02/13/2016; 6:00 pm	at FIU	L 65–79	4–22 (2–11)	FIU Arena (1,062); Miami, FL
02/18/2016; 8:00 pm, ASN	Louisiana Tech	L 74–87	4–23 (2–12)	Convocation Center (1,258); San Antonio, TX
02/20/2016; 3:00 pm, ASN	Southern Miss	W 74–53	5–23 (3–12)	Convocation Center (1,250); San Antonio, TX
02/25/2016; 6:00 pm	at Charlotte	L 108–114 ^{2OT}	5–24 (3–13)	Dale F. Halton Arena (3,701); Charlotte, NC
02/27/2016; 7:00 pm, ASN	at Old Dominion	L 56–78	5–25 (3–14)	Ted Constant Convocation Center (8,372); Norfolk, VA
03/05/2016; 3:00 pm, ASN	at UTEP	L 74–81	5–26 (3–15)	Don Haskins Center (7,430); El Paso, TX
Conference USA tournament
03/08/2016; 4:00 pm, ASN	vs. Florida Atlantic; First round	L 58–82	5–27	Bartow Arena (220); Birmingham, AL
*Non-conference game. ^{#}Rankings from AP Poll. (#) Tournament seedings in parentheses. All times are in Central Time.
