= 2015–16 Middle Tennessee Blue Raiders men's basketball team =

American college basketball season

2015–16 Middle Tennessee Blue Raiders men's basketball

C-USA tournament champions Great Alaska Shootout champions

NCAA tournament, Second Round
- Conference: Conference USA
- Record: 25–10 (13–5 C-USA)
- Head coach: Kermit Davis (14th season)
- Assistant coaches: Greg Grensing; Win Case; Ronnie Hamilton
- Home arena: Murphy Center

2015–16 Conference USA men's basketball standings
	Conf.				Overall
Team	W		L	PCT	W		L	PCT
UAB	16	–	2	.889	26	–	7	.788
Middle Tennessee †	13	–	5	.722	25	–	10	.714
Marshall	12	–	6	.667	17	–	16	.515
Louisiana Tech	12	–	6	.667	23	–	10	.697
Old Dominion	12	–	6	.667	25	–	13	.658
UTEP	10	–	8	.556	19	–	14	.576
Charlotte	9	–	9	.500	14	–	19	.424
Western Kentucky	8	–	10	.444	18	–	16	.529
North Texas	7	–	11	.389	12	–	20	.375
Rice	7	–	11	.389	12	–	20	.375
FIU	7	–	11	.389	13	–	19	.406
Florida Atlantic	5	–	13	.278	8	–	25	.242
Southern Miss*	5	–	13	.278	8	–	21	.276
UTSA	3	–	15	.167	5	–	27	.156
† 2016 C-USA Tournament winner *Ineligible for postseason play due to self-imposed postseason ban.

The 2015–16 Middle Tennessee Blue Raiders men's basketball team represented Middle Tennessee State University during the 2015–16 NCAA Division I men's basketball season. The Blue Raiders, led by 14th-year head coach Kermit Davis, played their home games at the Murphy Center and were members of Conference USA (C-USA). They finished the season 25–10, 13–5 in C-USA play to finish in second place. They defeated Charlotte, Marshall, and Old Dominion to be champions of the C-USA tournament and earn the conference's automatic bid to the NCAA tournament. As a #15 seed, in the first round they upset #2 seed and #2 nationally ranked Michigan State to become the eighth #15 seed to win an NCAA Tournament game. In the second round they lost to Syracuse.

== Previous season ==
The Blue Raiders finished the 2014–15 season 19–17, 9–9 in C-USA play to finish in sixth place. They advanced to the championship game of the C-USA tournament, where they lost to UAB. They were invited to the CollegeInsider.com Tournament, where they lost in the first round to Kent State.

== Departures ==
Name	Number	Pos.	Height	Weight	Year	Hometown	Notes
DeVante Jones	1	G	5'10"	160	Junior	Chicago, IL	Dismissed from the team
Andrew Rogan	14	G	6'3"	170	Freshman	Murfreesboro, TN	Walk-on; didn't return
JaQuel Richmond	15	G	6'1"	180	Freshman	Greensboro, NC	Transferred to UNC Wilmington
Marcus Tarrance	23	G	6'6"	210	Senior	Memphis, TN	Graduated
Gavin Gibson	32	G	6'4"	200	Junior	Chattanooga, TN	Walk-on; didn't return
Jacquez Rozier	42	F	6'7"	220	Senior	Waynesboro, GA	Graduated

=== Incoming transfers ===
Name	Number	Pos.	Height	Weight	Year	Hometown	Previous school
Aldonis Foote	15	F	6'5"	215	Junior	Peoria, IL	Junior college, transferred from Trinity Valley Community College
JaCorey Williams	22	F	6'8"	218	Senior	Birmingham, AL	Transferred from Arkansas. Under NCAA transfer rules, he had to sit out for the 2015–16 season. Had one year of remaining eligibility.
Quavius Copeland	24	G	6'0"	175	Sophomore	Greenville, SC	Junior college, transferred from Gulf Coast State College

Note: Justin Coleman, a junior who transferred from Mississippi Gulf Coast Community College, was going to be enrolled at the start of the fall of 2015. Later, he was dismissed from the team due to violations of team rules.

== Recruiting class of 2015 ==
College recruiting
Name	Hometown	School	Height	Weight	Commit date
Karl Gamble; PF	Columbia, SC	A. C. Flora High School	6 ft 8 in (2.03 m)	205 lb (93 kg)	May 19, 2014
Karl Gamble; PF	Recruit ratings: Scout: Rivals: (NR)				
Joan Duran; PF	Chattanooga, TN	Hamilton Heights Christian Academy	6 ft 6 in (1.98 m)	205 lb (93 kg)	Jan 27, 2015
Joan Duran; PF	Recruit ratings: Scout: Rivals: (NR)				
Overall recruit ranking:
Note: In many cases, Scout, Rivals, 247Sports, On3, and ESPN may conflict in their listings of height and weight.; In these cases, the average was taken. ESPN grades are on a 100-point scale.; Sources: "2015 Team Ranking". Rivals.

Note: Jalen Perry, a 2015 high school graduate from Louisville, Kentucky, was going to be enrolled in the fall of 2015. Later, he was dismissed from the team due to violations of team rules.

== Roster ==
2015–16 Middle Tennessee Blue Raiders men's basketball team
Players
Coaches

Pos.	#	Name	Height	Weight	Year	Previous school	Hometown
F	0	Darnell Harris	6 ft 8 in (2.03 m)	231 lb (105 kg)	Sr	Hamilton; Northwest Florida State	Milwaukee, WI
G/F	2	Perrin Buford	6 ft 6 in (1.98 m)	220 lb (100 kg)	Sr	Hillcrest; Southwest Tennessee State	Decatur, AL
F	3	Joshua Phillips	6 ft 8 in (2.03 m)	230 lb (104 kg)	Jr	Pope John Paul II	Hendersonville, TN
F	4	Xavier Haberham	6 ft 6 in (1.98 m)	205 lb (93 kg)	RS Jr	East Laurens; Hill College	Dublin, GA
G	5	Jacob Ivory	5 ft 9 in (1.75 m)	168 lb (76 kg)	So	East Murrah	Jackson, MS
G	10	Jaquawn Raymond	6 ft 4 in (1.93 m)	200 lb (91 kg)	RS Sr	Statesboro; North Carolina State	Statesboro, GA
G	11	Edward Simpson, Jr.	6 ft 2 in (1.88 m)	195 lb (88 kg)	So	St. Martin	Ocean Springs, MS
G	15	Aldonis Foote	6 ft 6 in (1.98 m)	210 lb (95 kg)	Jr	Trinity Valley CC	Peoria, IL
G	20	Giddy Potts	6 ft 2 in (1.88 m)	220 lb (100 kg)	So	Athens	Athens, AL
F	22	JaCorey Williams (I) (redshirt)	6 ft 8 in (2.03 m)	218 lb (99 kg)	Sr	Arkansas	Birmingham, AL
G	24	Quavius Copeland	6 ft 0 in (1.83 m)	175 lb (79 kg)	So	Southside; Gulf Coast State College	Greenville, SC
F	25	Karl Gamble	6 ft 9 in (2.06 m)	220 lb (100 kg)	Fr	A.C. Flora	Columbia, SC
F	30	Reggie Upshaw Jr.	6 ft 7 in (2.01 m)	232 lb (105 kg)	Jr	Baylor School	Chattanooga, TN

Head coach

- Kermit Davis (Purdue)

Assistant coach(es)

- Greg Grensing (Texas State)
- Win Case (Oklahoma City)
- Ronnie Hamilton (UNC Pembroke)

Legend

- (C) Team captain
- (S) Suspended
- (I) Ineligible
- (W) Walk-on
- Injured
- Current redshirt

Roster

== Schedule ==
Date time, TV	Rank^{#}	Opponent^{#}	Result	Record	Site (attendance) city, state
Exhibition
11/12/2015*; 6:30 pm		Faulkner	W 84–63		Murphy Center (2,512); Murfreesboro, TN
Non-conference regular season
11/17/2015*; 7:00 pm, ASN		at Murray State	L 65–76	0–1	CFSB Center (3,070); Murray, KY
11/21/2015*; 7:00 pm		at Tennessee State	W 69–66	1–1	Gentry Complex (1,500); Nashville, TN
11/26/2015*; 8:30 pm, CBSSN		at Alaska Anchorage; Great Alaska Shootout Quarterfinals	W 75–72	2–1	Alaska Airlines Center (2,478); Anchorage, AK
11/27/2015*; 11:00 pm, CBSSN		vs. UNC Asheville; Great Alaska Shootout semifinals	W 63–61	3–1	Alaska Airlines Center (2,822); Anchorage, AK
11/28/2015*; 11:30 pm, CBSSN		vs. Toledo; Great Alaska Shootout championship	W 78–70	4–1	Alaska Airlines Center (3,132); Anchorage, AK
12/02/2015*; 8:00 pm, FSN		VCU	L 56–62	4–2	Murphy Center (8,882); Murfreesboro, TN
12/05/2015*; 5:00 pm, ASN		South Alabama	W 68–55	5–2	Murphy Center (4,106); Murfreesboro, TN
12/12/2015*; 12:00 pm, MT10		vs. Auburn	W 88–81	6–2	Bridgestone Arena (7,322); Nashville, TN
12/17/2015*; 6:00 pm, ASN		Belmont	W 83–62	7–2	Murphy Center (5,555); Murfreesboro, TN
12/22/2015*; 6:00 pm		at Georgia State	L 62–64	7–3	GSU Sports Arena (1,819); Atlanta, GA
12/27/2015*; 4:30 pm, FSN		vs. South Dakota State	L 61–65	7–4	Sanford Pentagon (3,200); Sioux Falls, SD
12/30/2015*; 6:00 pm		Trevecca Nazarene	W 82–67	8–4	Murphy Center (3,122); Murfreesboro, TN
Conference USA regular season
01/03/2016; 2:00 pm, ASN		at UAB	L 67–78	8–5 (0–1)	Bartow Arena (4,279); Birmingham, AL
01/07/2016; 6:00 pm, ASN		UTEP	W 78–72	9–5 (1–1)	Murphy Center (4,105); Murfreesboro, TN
01/09/2016; 3:00 pm, ASN		UTSA	W 79–71	10–5 (2–1)	Murphy Center (4,632); Murfreesboro, TN
01/14/2016; 6:00 pm		at Charlotte	W 73–72	11–5 (3–1)	Dale F. Halton Arena (3,914); Charlotte, NC
01/16/2016; 3:00 pm, FSN		at Old Dominion	W 64–61	12–5 (4–1)	Ted Constant Convocation Center (7,067); Norfolk, VA
01/21/2016; 6:30 pm		North Texas	W 86–64	13–5 (5–1)	Murphy Center (3,826); Murfreesboro, TN
01/23/2016; 5:00 pm		Rice	W 87–73	14–5 (6–1)	Murphy Center (4,104); Murfreesboro, TN
01/28/2016; 6:00 pm		at Marshall	L 66–82	14–6 (6–2)	Cam Henderson Center (5,724); Huntington, WV
01/30/2016; 7:00 pm, FCS		at WKU	W 66–64	15–6 (7–2)	E. A. Diddle Arena (5,259); Bowling Green, KY
02/04/2016; 6:30 pm, MT10		Florida Atlantic	W 85–73	16–6 (8–2)	Murphy Center (5,411); Murfreesboro, TN
02/06/2016; 6:00 pm		FIU	W 67–66	17–6 (9–2)	Murphy Center (5,298); Murfreesboro, TN
02/11/2016; 8:00 pm, ASN		at Louisiana Tech	L 63–73	17–7 (9–3)	Thomas Assembly Center (5,011); Ruston, LA
02/13/2016; 7:00 pm		at Southern Miss	W 76–54	18–7 (10–3)	Reed Green Coliseum (2,917); Hattiesburg, MS
02/21/2016; 5:00 pm, CBSSN		UAB	L 67–77	18–8 (10–4)	Murphy Center (7,822); Murfreesboro, TN
02/25/2016; 6:00 pm, ASN		WKU	L 72–78	18–9 (10–5)	Murphy Center (4,333); Murfreesboro, TN
02/27/2016; 5:00 pm		Marshall	W 83–74	19–9 (11–5)	Murphy Center (4,051); Murfreesboro, TN
03/03/2016; 6:00 pm		at Florida Atlantic	W 76–59	20–9 (12–5)	FAU Arena (1,040); Boca Raton, FL
03/05/2016; 5:00 pm, ASN		at FIU	W 61–58	21–9 (13–5)	FIU Arena (2,422); Miami, FL
Conference USA tournament
03/10/2016; 6:00 pm, ASN	(2)	vs. (7) Charlotte; Quarterfinals	W 79–61	22–9	Legacy Arena (9,797); Birmingham, AL
03/11/2016; 5:30 pm, CBSSN	(2)	vs. (6) Marshall; Semifinals	W 99–90	23–9	Legacy Arena (6,176); Birmingham, AL
03/12/2016; 1:30 pm, FS1	(2)	vs. (5) Old Dominion; Championship	W 55–53	24–9	Legacy Arena (5,519); Birmingham, AL
NCAA tournament
03/18/2016*; 1:45 pm, CBS	(15 MW)	vs. (2 MW) No. 2 Michigan State; First Round	W 90–81	25–9	Scottrade Center (14,250); St. Louis, MO
03/20/2016*; 5:10 pm, TNT	(15 MW)	vs. (10 MW) Syracuse; Second Round	L 50–75	25–10	Scottrade Center (15,169); St. Louis, MO
*Non-conference game. ^{#}Rankings from AP Poll. (#) Tournament seedings in parentheses. MW=Midwest Region. All times are in Central Time.
