= 2015–16 UAB Blazers men's basketball team =

American college basketball season

2015–16 UAB Blazers men's basketball

C-USA regular season champions

NIT, First round
- Conference: Conference USA
- Record: 26–7 (16–2 C-USA)
- Head coach: Jerod Haase (4th season)
- Assistant coaches: Robert Ehsan; Jeff Wulbrun; Turner Battle
- Home arena: Bartow Arena

2015–16 Conference USA men's basketball standings
	Conf.				Overall
Team	W		L	PCT	W		L	PCT
UAB	16	–	2	.889	26	–	7	.788
Middle Tennessee †	13	–	5	.722	25	–	10	.714
Marshall	12	–	6	.667	17	–	16	.515
Louisiana Tech	12	–	6	.667	23	–	10	.697
Old Dominion	12	–	6	.667	25	–	13	.658
UTEP	10	–	8	.556	19	–	14	.576
Charlotte	9	–	9	.500	14	–	19	.424
Western Kentucky	8	–	10	.444	18	–	16	.529
North Texas	7	–	11	.389	12	–	20	.375
Rice	7	–	11	.389	12	–	20	.375
FIU	7	–	11	.389	13	–	19	.406
Florida Atlantic	5	–	13	.278	8	–	25	.242
Southern Miss*	5	–	13	.278	8	–	21	.276
UTSA	3	–	15	.167	5	–	27	.156
† 2016 C-USA Tournament winner *Ineligible for postseason play due to self-imposed postseason ban.

The 2015–16 UAB Blazers basketball team represented the University of Alabama at Birmingham during the 2015–16 NCAA Division I men's basketball season. The Blazers, led by fourth year head coach Jerod Haase, played their home games at the Bartow Arena as members of Conference USA. They finished the season 26–7, 16–2 in C-USA play to win the C-USA regular season championship. They lost in the quarterfinals of the C-USA tournament to WKU. As a regular season conference champion who failed to win their conference tournament, they received an automatic bid to the National Invitation Tournament where they lost in the first round to BYU.

Following the season, head coach Jerod Haase left UAB to accept the head coaching position at Stanford. On April 4, 2016, the school hired Robert Ehsan, who had been an assistant under Haase at UAB, as head coach .

== Previous season ==
The Blazers finished the 2014–15 season 20–16, 12–6 in C-USA play to finish in a tie for fourth place. They defeated WKU, Louisiana Tech, and Middle Tennessee to become champions of the C-USA tournament. They received the conference's automatic bid to the NCAA tournament as a No. 14 seed where they upset No. 3-seeded and No. 9-ranked Iowa State in the Second round before losing in the Third round to No. 11-seeded UCLA.

== Departures ==
Name	Number	Pos.	Height	Weight	Year	Hometown	Previous School
Jarvis Calhoun	5	G	6'0"	165	Freshman	Trussville, AL	Transferred to John A. Logan College
C. J. Washington	25	F	6'8"	219	Senior	Augusta, GA	Graduated
Denzel Collins	40	G	6'2"	200	Senior	Savannah, GA	Graduated

=== Incoming transfers ===
Name	Number	Pos.	Height	Weight	Year	Hometown	Previous School
Deion Lavender	5	G	6'3"	180	Sophomore	Alton, IL	Transferred from Southern Illinois. Under NCAA transfer rules, Lavender will have to sit out for the 2015–16 season. Will have three years of remaining eligibility.

== Incoming recruits ==
College recruiting information
Name	Hometown	School	Height	Weight	Commit date
Dirk Williams; SG	Homewood, AL	Tallahassee Community College	6 ft 5 in (1.96 m)	175 lb (79 kg)	N/A
Dirk Williams; SG	Recruit ratings: Scout: Rivals: (JR)				
Overall recruit ranking:
Note: In many cases, Scout, Rivals, 247Sports, On3, and ESPN may conflict in their listings of height and weight.; In these cases, the average was taken. ESPN grades are on a 100-point scale.; Sources: "2015 Team Ranking". Rivals.

== Roster ==
2015–16 UAB Blazers men's basketball team
Players
Coaches

Pos.	#	Name	Height	Weight	Year	Hometown
G	0	Hakeem Baxter	6 ft 2 in (1.88 m)	170 lb (77 kg)	Jr	Philadelphia, PA
G	1	Denzell Watts	6 ft 2 in (1.88 m)	207 lb (94 kg)	Jr	Flint, MI
G	2	Nick Norton	5 ft 10 in (1.78 m)	175 lb (79 kg)	So	Bloomington, IL
F	3	Chris Cokley	6 ft 8 in (2.03 m)	216 lb (98 kg)	So	Savannah, GA
G	4	Robert Brown	6 ft 5 in (1.96 m)	190 lb (86 kg)	RS Sr	Clermont, FL
G	5	Deion Lavender (redshirt)	6 ft 2 in (1.88 m)	190 lb (86 kg)	So	Alton, IL
G	11	Dirk Williams	6 ft 5 in (1.96 m)	175 lb (79 kg)	Jr	Homewood, AL
F	21	Tosin Mehinti	6 ft 9 in (2.06 m)	213 lb (97 kg)	Jr	Lithonia, GA
G	22	Tyler Madison	6 ft 4 in (1.93 m)	225 lb (102 kg)	Jr	Columbiana, AL
F	33	Thomas Smallwood	7 ft 0 in (2.13 m)	217 lb (98 kg)	Fr	Bordeaux, France
F	34	William Lee	6 ft 9 in (2.06 m)	210 lb (95 kg)	So	Plantersville, AL
F	35	Lewis Sullivan	6 ft 7 in (2.01 m)	195 lb (88 kg)	So	Hazen Green, AL
G	45	Lionel Love (W)	6 ft 3 in (1.91 m)	165 lb (75 kg)	So	Huntsville, AL

Head coach

Jerod Haase

Assistant coach(es)

Robert Ehsan

Richie Riley

Turner Battle

Legend

- (C) Team captain
- (S) Suspended
- (I) Ineligible
- (W) Walk-on
- Injured
- Current redshirt

Roster

== Schedule ==
Date time, TV	Rank^{#}	Opponent^{#}	Result	Record	Site (attendance) city, state
Exhibition
November 6*; 7:00 pm		Cal State East Bay	W 99–59		Bartow Arena (3,553); Birmingham, AL
Non-conference regular season
November 13*; 8:30 pm, SECN+		at Auburn	L 74–75	0–1	Auburn Arena (9,121); Auburn, AL
November 16*; 8:00 pm, ASN		Alabama State; Emerald Coast Classic	W 72–70	1–1	Bartow Arena (4,833); Birmingham, AL
November 19*; 7:00 pm		at Troy	W 79–63	2–1	Trojan Arena (2,887); Troy, AL
November 22*; 4:00 pm, ASN		Jacksonville State; Emerald Coast Classic	W 61–55	3–1	Bartow Arena (3,939); Birmingham, AL
November 27*; 8:30 pm, CBSSN		vs. Illinois; Emerald Coast Classic semifinals	L 58–72	3–2	The Arena at NWFSC (2,222); Niceville, FL
November 28*; 2:30 pm, CBSSN		vs. Virginia Tech; Emerald Coast Classic 3rd place game	L 77–82 ^{OT}	3–3	The Arena at NWFSC (2,222); Niceville, FL
December 1*; 8:00 pm, ASN		Georgia State	W 64–57	4–3	Bartow Arena (3,709); Birmingham, AL
December 5*; 7:00 pm, ESPN3		at Illinois State	W 74–61	5–3	Redbird Arena (5,093); Normal, IL
December 13*; 7:00 pm		Seattle	W 79–73	6–3	Bartow Arena (3,587); Birmingham, AL
December 16*; 7:00 pm		USC Upstate	W 96–54	7–3	Bartow Arena (3,395); Birmingham, AL
December 19*; 6:00 pm, ESPN3		at South Florida	W 79–68	8–3	USF Sun Dome (2,671); Tampa, FL
December 22*; 7:00 pm		Hiwassee	W 116–43	9–3	Bartow Arena (3,455); Birmingham, AL
December 29*; 2:30 pm, ASN		Stephen F. Austin	W 76–66	10–3	Bartow Arena (3,956); Birmingham, AL
Conference USA regular season
January 3; 2:00 pm, ASN		Middle Tennessee	W 78–67	11–3 (1–0)	Bartow Arena (4,279); Birmingham, AL
January 7; 7:00 pm		UTSA	W 104–82	12–3 (2–0)	Bartow Arena (3,747); Birmingham, AL
January 9; 1:00 pm, CBSSN		UTEP	W 87–80	13–3 (3–0)	Bartow Arena (4,287); Birmingham, AL
January 14; 6:00 pm, CBSSN		at Old Dominion	W 72–71 ^{OT}	14–3 (4–0)	Ted Constant Convocation Center (7,162); Norfolk, VA
January 16; 6:00 pm		at Charlotte	W 74–72	15–3 (5–0)	Dale F. Halton Arena (4,477); Charlotte, NC
January 21; 8:00 pm, CBSSN		Rice	W 82–70	16–3 (6–0)	Bartow Arena (5,535); Birmingham, AL
January 23; 7:00 pm		North Texas	W 78–57	17–3 (7–0)	Bartow Arena (6,835); Birmingham, AL
January 28; 6:30 pm, FS1		at WKU	L 62–69	17–4 (7–1)	E.A. Diddle Arena (3,892); Bowling Green, KY
January 30; 11:00 am, CBSSN		at Marshall	W 81–78	18–4 (8–1)	Cam Henderson Center (7,085); Huntington, WV
February 4; 7:00 pm, ASN		FIU	W 74–69	19–4 (9–1)	Bartow Arena (6,664); Birmingham, AL
February 6; 7:00 pm		Florida Atlantic	W 104–67	20–4 (10–1)	Bartow Arena (6,211); Birmingham, AL
February 11; 7:00 pm		at Southern Miss	W 80–77 ^{2OT}	21–4 (11–1)	Reed Green Coliseum (2,895); Hattiesburg, MS
February 13; 1:00 pm, FSN		at Louisiana Tech	L 76–85	21–5 (11–2)	Thomas Assembly Center (5,213); Ruston, LA
February 21; 5:00 pm, CBSSN		at Middle Tennessee	W 77–67	22–5 (12–2)	Murphy Center (7,822); Murfreesboro, TN
February 25; 7:00 pm		Marshall	W 95–91	23–5 (13–2)	Bartow Arena (7,190); Birmingham, AL
February 27; 11:00 am, FSN		WKU	W 71–67	24–5 (14–2)	Bartow Arena (7,510); Birmingham, AL
March 3; 6:00 pm		at FIU	W 77–60	25–5 (15–2)	FIU Arena (1,166); Miami, FL
March 5; 11:00 am, ASN		at Florida Atlantic	W 73–70	26–5 (16–2)	FAU Arena (729); Boca Raton, FL
Conference USA tournament
March 10; 12:00 pm, ASN	(1)	vs. (8) WKU; Quarterfinals	L 77–88	26–6	Legacy Arena (9,797); Birmingham, AL
NIT
March 19*; 10:00 pm, ESPNU	(7)	at (2) BYU; First round – St. Bonaventure Bracket	L 79–97	26–7	Marriott Center (8,420); Provo, UT
*Non-conference game. ^{#}Rankings from AP Poll. (#) Tournament seedings in parentheses. All times are in Central Time.
