= 2015–16 Charlotte 49ers men's basketball team =

American college basketball season

2015–16 Charlotte 49ers men's basketball
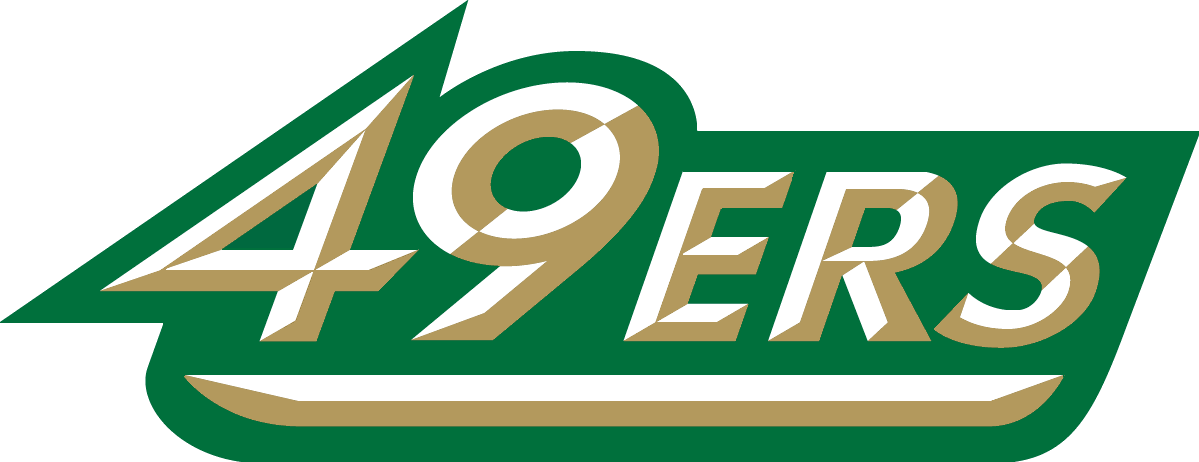
- Conference: Conference USA
- Record: 14–19 (9–9 C-USA)
- Head coach: Mark Price (1st season)
- Assistant coaches: Houston Fancher; Chris Ferguson; Andre Gray
- Home arena: Dale F. Halton Arena

2015–16 Conference USA men's basketball standings
	Conf.				Overall
Team	W		L	PCT	W		L	PCT
UAB	16	–	2	.889	26	–	7	.788
Middle Tennessee †	13	–	5	.722	25	–	10	.714
Marshall	12	–	6	.667	17	–	16	.515
Louisiana Tech	12	–	6	.667	23	–	10	.697
Old Dominion	12	–	6	.667	25	–	13	.658
UTEP	10	–	8	.556	19	–	14	.576
Charlotte	9	–	9	.500	14	–	19	.424
Western Kentucky	8	–	10	.444	18	–	16	.529
North Texas	7	–	11	.389	12	–	20	.375
Rice	7	–	11	.389	12	–	20	.375
FIU	7	–	11	.389	13	–	19	.406
Florida Atlantic	5	–	13	.278	8	–	25	.242
Southern Miss*	5	–	13	.278	8	–	21	.276
UTSA	3	–	15	.167	5	–	27	.156
† 2016 C-USA Tournament winner *Ineligible for postseason play due to self-imposed postseason ban.

The 2015–16 Charlotte 49ers men's basketball team represented the University of North Carolina at Charlotte during the 2015–16 NCAA Division I men's basketball season. The 49ers, led by first year head coach Mark Price, played their home games at the Dale F. Halton Arena and were members Conference USA. They finished the season 14–19, 9–9 in C-USA play to finish in seventh place. They defeated Rice in the second round of the C-USA tournament to advance to the quarterfinals where they lost to Middle Tennessee.

== Previous season ==
The 49ers finished the 2014–15 season 14–18, 7–11 in C-USA play to finish in a tie for eleventh place. They lost in the first round of the C-USA tournament to Middle Tennessee.

== Departures ==
Name	Number	Pos.	Height	Weight	Year	Hometown	Notes
Torin Dorn	2	G	6'4"	201	Freshman	Charlotte, NC	Transferred to North Carolina State
Shawn Lester	3	G	6'4"	196	Junior	Mooresville, NC	Signed to play professionally overseas
Keyshawn Woods	5	G	6'3"	182	Freshman	Gastonia, NC	Transferred to Wake Forest
Mike Thorne Jr.	11	C	6'11"	270	RS Junior	Fayetteville, NC	Graduate transferred to Illinois
Terrence Williams	14	G	6'4"	221	Senior	Charlotte, NC	Graduated
Pierriá Henry	15	G	6'4"	197	Senior	Charleston, WV	Graduated
Willie Clayton	21	F	6'8"	238	Junior	Thomasville, GA	Graduate transferred to Georgia State

== Incoming transfers ==
Name	Number	Pos.	Height	Weight	Year	Hometown	Previous
Ridell Camidge	0	G	6'3"	170	Sophomore	Wilmington, NC	Junior college transferred from Cloud County Community College
Anthony Vanhook	15	F	6'4"	210	Junior	Chapel Hill, NC	Junior college transferred from Cape Fear Community College
Hudson Price	21	G	6'6"	200	Junior	Orlando, FL	Transferred from TCU. Son of incoming Charlotte head coach Mark Price.
Joseph Uchebo	50	C	6'10"	260	Senior	Enugu, Nigeria	Transferred from Pittsburgh. Will be eligible to play immediately since Uchebo graduated from Pittsburgh.

== Class of 2015 recruits ==
College recruiting
Name	Hometown	School	Height	Weight	Commit date
Jon Davis; SG	Upper Marlboro, MD	Hargrave Military Academy	6 ft 2 in (1.88 m)	175 lb (79 kg)	Apr 21, 2015
Jon Davis; SG	Recruit ratings: Scout: Rivals: (77)				
Curran Scott; SG	Edmond, OK	Edmond Memorial High School	6 ft 3 in (1.91 m)	193 lb (88 kg)	
Curran Scott; SG	Recruit ratings: Scout: Rivals: (NR)				
Karoliis Kundrotas; PF	Lithuania	Barking Abbey	6 ft 10 in (2.08 m)	240 lb (110 kg)	Feb 24, 2015
Karoliis Kundrotas; PF	Recruit ratings: Scout: Rivals: (NR)				
Andrien White; PG	Chester, VA	Quality Education Academy	6 ft 2 in (1.88 m)	150 lb (68 kg)	May 4, 2015
Andrien White; PG	Recruit ratings: Scout: Rivals: (NR)0				
Overall recruit ranking:
Note: In many cases, Scout, Rivals, 247Sports, On3, and ESPN may conflict in their listings of height and weight.; In these cases, the average was taken. ESPN grades are on a 100-point scale.; Sources: "2015 Team Ranking". Rivals.

== Roster ==
2015–16 Charlotte 49ers men's basketball team
Players
Coaches

Pos.	#	Name	Height	Weight	Year	Hometown
G	0	Ridell Camidge	6 ft 3 in (1.91 m)	175 lb (79 kg)	So	Wilmington, NC
G	1	Braxton Ogbueze	6 ft 0 in (1.83 m)	187 lb (85 kg)	RS Jr	Charlotte, NC
G	2	Andrien White	6 ft 3 in (1.91 m)	190 lb (86 kg)	Fr	Richmond, VA
G	3	Jon Davis	6 ft 3 in (1.91 m)	170 lb (77 kg)	Fr	Upper Marlboro, MD
G	5	Gavin Wilson (W)	6 ft 1 in (1.85 m)	210 lb (95 kg)	Sr	Raleigh, NC
G	10	Curran Scott	6 ft 3 in (1.91 m)	193 lb (88 kg)	Fr	Edmond, OK
F/C	12	Lukas Bergang	7 ft 0 in (2.13 m)	210 lb (95 kg)	Fr	Gothenburg, Sweden
F	15	Anthony Vanhook	6 ft 4 in (1.93 m)	210 lb (95 kg)	Jr	Chapel Hill, NC
F	20	Cameron Blakely	6 ft 9 in (2.06 m)	214 lb (97 kg)	Jr	Winder, GA
G	21	Hudson Price (redshirt)	6 ft 6 in (1.98 m)	200 lb (91 kg)	Jr	Orlando, FL
F	22	Bernard Sullivan	6 ft 8 in (2.03 m)	231 lb (105 kg)	RS Sr	Gastonia, NC
F	25	Reid Aube (W)	6 ft 6 in (1.98 m)	220 lb (100 kg)	Jr	Concord, NC
G	30	Mitch Warner (W)	6 ft 3 in (1.91 m)	192 lb (87 kg)	Sr	Charlotte, NC
C	31	Benas Griciunas	7 ft 0 in (2.13 m)	229 lb (104 kg)	RS So	Šilutė, Lithuania
G	35	Cameron Pappas (W)	6 ft 1 in (1.85 m)	175 lb (79 kg)	Sr	Hillsborough, NC
C	50	Joseph Uchebo	6 ft 10 in (2.08 m)	235 lb (107 kg)	Sr	Enugu, Nigeria
G	55	Ivan Benkovic	6 ft 7 in (2.01 m)	207 lb (94 kg)	Jr	Zagreb, Croatia

Head coach

- Mark Price (Georgia Tech)

Assistant coach(es)

- Houston Fancher (Middle Tennessee)
- Chris Ferguson (Cumberlands)
- Andre Gray (Methodist)

Legend

- (C) Team captain
- (S) Suspended
- (I) Ineligible
- (W) Walk-on
- Injured
- Current redshirt

Roster

== Schedule ==
Date time, TV	Rank^{#}	Opponent^{#}	Result	Record	Site (attendance) city, state
Exhibition
11/09/2015*; 7:00 pm		Methodist	W 98–73		Dale F. Halton Arena (3,100); Charlotte, NC
Regular season
11/13/2015*; 8:30 pm, ASN		Elon	L 74–85	0–1	Dale F. Halton Arena (5,390); Charlotte, NC
11/16/2015*; 7:00 pm, ESPN3		at East Carolina	L 74–85	0–2	Williams Arena at Minges Coliseum (5,390); Greenville, NC
11/19/2015*; 7:00 pm		Furman; Battle 4 Atlantis Opening Round	W 77–68	1–2	Dale F. Halton Arena (4,562); Charlotte, NC
11/25/2015*; 2:30 pm, ESPN2		vs. Syracuse; Battle 4 Atlantis quarterfinals	L 70–83	1–3	Imperial Arena (1,744); Nassau, Bahamas
11/26/2015*; 9:30 pm, AXS TV		vs. Michigan; Battle 4 Atlantis consolation round	L 47–102	1–4	Imperial Arena (1,339); Nassau, Bahamas
11/27/2015*; 9:30 pm, AXS TV		vs. Washington; Battle 4 Atlantis 7th place game	L 66–71	1–5	Imperial Arena (1,065); Nassau, Bahamas
12/01/2015*; 7:00 pm		Davidson	L 74–109	1–6	Dale F. Halton Arena (7,571); Charlotte, NC
12/05/2015*; 4:00 pm, ESPN3		at Miami (FL)	L 60–88	1–7	BankUnited Center (6,735); Coral Gables, FL
12/09/2015*; 7:00 pm, UNC Charlotte TV		Campbell	L 70–76	1–8	Dale F. Halton Arena (3,687); Charlotte, NC
12/19/2015*; 2:00 pm		at Appalachian State	W 82–66	2–8	Holmes Center (376); Boone, NC
12/22/2015*; 7:00 pm, CBSSN		vs. Georgetown	L 59–62	2–9	Time Warner Cable Arena (6,448); Charlotte, NC
12/29/2015*; 7:00 pm		The Citadel	W 111–93	3–9	Dale F. Halton Arena (4,026); Charlotte, NC
01/02/2016; 12:00 pm, ASN		at Old Dominion	L 65–74	3–10 (0–1)	Ted Constant Convocation Center (6,733); Norfolk, VA
01/07/2016; 8:00 pm		at Southern Miss	W 82–76	4–10 (1–1)	Reed Green Coliseum (2,703); Hattiesburg, MS
01/09/2016; 7:30 pm		at Louisiana Tech	L 90–93 ^{OT}	4–11 (1–2)	Thomas Assembly Center (4,209); Ruston, LA
01/14/2016; 7:00 pm		Middle Tennessee	L 72–73	4–12 (1–3)	Dale F. Halton Arena (3,914); Charlotte, NC
01/16/2016; 7:00 pm		UAB	L 72–74	4–13 (1–4)	Dale F. Halton Arena (4,477); Charlotte, NC
01/21/2016; 7:00 pm, UNC Charlotte TV		Marshall	W 103–95	5–13 (2–4)	Dale F. Halton Arena (4,015); Charlotte, NC
01/23/2016; 7:00 pm, FCS; UNC Charlotte TV		WKU	W 88–71	6–13 (3–4)	Dale F. Halton Arena (4,197); Charlotte, NC
01/28/2016; 7:00 pm, ASN		at FIU	W 72–69	7–13 (4–4)	FIU Arena; Miami, FL
01/30/2016; 2:00 pm, ASN		at Florida Atlantic	L 77–82	7–14 (4–5)	FAU Arena (936); Boca Roton, FL
02/03/2016*; 7:00 pm		at North Carolina A&T	W 92–72	8–14	Corbett Sports Center (1,081); Greensboro, NC
02/06/2016; 7:00 pm, UNC Charlotte TV		Old Dominion	L 69–74 ^{OT}	8–15 (4–6)	Dale F. Halton Arena (4,646); Charlotte, NC
02/11/2016; 7:00 pm		Rice	W 102–73	9–15 (5–6)	Dale F. Halton Arena (3,127); Charlotte, NC
02/13/2016; 4:00 pm, ASN		North Texas	W 103–79	10–15 (6–6)	Dale F. Halton Arena (4,444); Charlotte, NC
02/18/2016; 7:00 pm, ASN		at Marshall	L 72–87	10–16 (6–7)	Cam Henderson Center (6,164); Huntington, WV
02/20/2016; 3:00 pm, FCS		at WKU	L 54–59	10–17 (6–8)	E. A. Diddle Arena (3,570); Bowling Green, KY
02/25/2016; 7:00 pm		UTSA	W 114–108 ^{2OT}	11–17 (7–8)	Dale F. Halton Arena (3,701); Charlotte, NC
02/27/2016; 7:00 pm, UNC Charlotte TV		UTEP	W 88–78	12–17 (8–8)	Dale F. Halton Arena (5,813); Charlotte, NC
03/03/2016; 8:00 pm		at Rice	W 88–75	13–17 (9–8)	Tudor Fieldhouse (1,349); Houston, TX
03/05/2016; 8:00 pm		at North Texas	L 77–80	13–18 (9–9)	The Super Pit (2,156); Denton, TX
Conference USA tournament
03/09/2016; 7:00 pm, ASN		vs. Rice; Second round	W 79–69	14–18	Legacy Arena (3,905); Birmingham, AL
03/10/2016; 7:00 pm, ASN		vs. Middle Tennessee; Quarterfinals	L 61–79	14–19	Legacy Arena (3,933); Birmingham, AL
*Non-conference game. ^{#}Rankings from AP Poll/Coaches' Poll. (#) Tournament seedings in parentheses. All times are in Eastern Time.
