= 2015–16 FIU Panthers men's basketball team =

American college basketball season

2015–16 FIU Panthers men's basketball
- Conference: Conference USA
- Record: 13–19 (7–11 C-USA)
- Head coach: Anthony Evans (3rd season)
- Assistant coaches: Chris Capko; Mike Gillian; Spencer Wright
- Home arena: FIU Arena

2015–16 Conference USA men's basketball standings
	Conf.				Overall
Team	W		L	PCT	W		L	PCT
UAB	16	–	2	.889	26	–	7	.788
Middle Tennessee †	13	–	5	.722	25	–	10	.714
Marshall	12	–	6	.667	17	–	16	.515
Louisiana Tech	12	–	6	.667	23	–	10	.697
Old Dominion	12	–	6	.667	25	–	13	.658
UTEP	10	–	8	.556	19	–	14	.576
Charlotte	9	–	9	.500	14	–	19	.424
Western Kentucky	8	–	10	.444	18	–	16	.529
North Texas	7	–	11	.389	12	–	20	.375
Rice	7	–	11	.389	12	–	20	.375
FIU	7	–	11	.389	13	–	19	.406
Florida Atlantic	5	–	13	.278	8	–	25	.242
Southern Miss*	5	–	13	.278	8	–	21	.276
UTSA	3	–	15	.167	5	–	27	.156
† 2016 C-USA Tournament winner *Ineligible for postseason play due to self-imposed postseason ban.

The 2015–16 FIU Panthers men's basketball team represented Florida International University during the 2015–16 NCAA Division I men's basketball season. The Panthers, led by third year head coach Anthony Evans, played their home games at FIU Arena, and were members of Conference USA. They finished the season 13–19, 7–11 in C-USA play to finish in a three way tie for ninth place. They lost in the second round of the C-USA tournament to UTEP.

== Previous season ==
The Panthers finished the season 16–17, 8–10 in C-USA play in a 4 way tie for seventh place. They advanced to the quarterfinals of the C-USA tournament where they lost to UTEP.

== Departures ==
Name	Number	Pos.	Height	Weight	Year	Hometown	Notes
Dominique Williams	12	G	6'7"	205	Sophomore	Washington, D.C.	Transferred
Larry Dennis	21	F	6'9"	205	Freshman	Wichita, KS	Transferred to Hutchinson CC
Dennis Marvin	22	G	6'3"	183	RS Senior	Gainesville, FL	Graduated
Marco Porcher Jimenez	23	G	6'4"	185	Senior	Málaga, Spain	Graduated
Kris Gulley	45	G/F	6'7"	195	Senior	Dallas, TX	Graduated

=== Incoming transfers ===
Name	Number	Pos.	Height	Weight	Year	Hometown	Previous School
Donte' McGill	2	G	6'3"	185	Junior	Newark, DE	Junior college transferred from Vincennes
Elmo Stephen	5	F	6'7"	200	Junior	Auburndale, FL	Junior college transferred from Tallahassee CC
Cameron Smith	24	F	6'7"	210	Sophomore	Tallahassee, FL	Junior college transferred from Tallahassee CC

== Recruiting class of 2015 ==
College recruiting information
Name	Hometown	School	Height	Weight	Commit date
Eric Turner; SF	The Villages, FL	The Villages Charter High School	6 ft 5 in (1.96 m)	193 lb (88 kg)	
Eric Turner; SF	Recruit ratings: Scout: Rivals: (77)				
Michael Douglas; PF	Sachse, TX	Sachse High School	6 ft 5 in (1.96 m)	N/A	Sep 23, 2014
Michael Douglas; PF	Recruit ratings: Scout: Rivals: (NR)				
Kimar Williams; PG	Philadelphia, PA	Constitution High School	6 ft 1 in (1.85 m)	145 lb (66 kg)	Mar 29, 2015
Kimar Williams; PG	Recruit ratings: Scout: Rivals: (NR)				
Overall recruit ranking:
Note: In many cases, Scout, Rivals, 247Sports, On3, and ESPN may conflict in their listings of height and weight.; In these cases, the average was taken. ESPN grades are on a 100-point scale.; Sources: "2015 Team Ranking". Rivals.

== Roster ==
2015–16 FIU Panthers men's basketball team
Players
Coaches

Pos.	#	Name	Height	Weight	Year	Previous school	Hometown
G	1	Anthony Boswell	6 ft 6 in (1.98 m)	205 lb (93 kg)	Jr	Patrick School	Bronx, NY
G	2	Donte McGill	6 ft 3 in (1.91 m)	185 lb (84 kg)	Jr	Mont Clare Academy; Vincennes	Newark, DE
G	3	Tashwan Desir	5 ft 10 in (1.78 m)	178 lb (81 kg)	Sr	NIA Prep; Monroe CC	Brooklyn, NY
G	4	Kimar Williams	6 ft 1 in (1.85 m)	170 lb (77 kg)	Fr	Constitution	Philadelphia, PA
F	5	Elmo Stephen	6 ft 7 in (2.01 m)	200 lb (91 kg)	Jr	Auburndale; Tallahassee CC	Auburndale, FL
F	10	Hassan Hussein	6 ft 9 in (2.06 m)	205 lb (93 kg)	So	Mt. Zion Prep	Lorton, VA
G	11	Ray Rodriquez	6 ft 1 in (1.85 m)	180 lb (82 kg)	RS Jr	Hialeah Gardens; North Florida	Miami, FL
G	12	Eric Nottage	6 ft 2 in (1.88 m)	180 lb (82 kg)	Jr	Miami Northwestern; Tallahassee CC	Miami, FL
F	20	Adrian Diaz	6 ft 10 in (2.08 m)	230 lb (104 kg)	RS Sr	Hialeah-Miami Lakes; Kansas State	Miami, FL
F	24	Cameron Smith	6 ft 7 in (2.01 m)	210 lb (95 kg)	So	Leon; Tallahassee CC	Tallahassee, FL
F	31	Michael Douglas	6 ft 5 in (1.96 m)	190 lb (86 kg)	Fr	Sachse	Sachse, TX
F	32	Daviyon Draper	6 ft 7 in (2.01 m)	217 lb (98 kg)	Sr	Locke; Antelope Valley College	Los Angeles, CA
C	34	Nate Brown Bull	7 ft 1 in (2.16 m)	215 lb (98 kg)	Fr	Little Wound	Kyle, SD

Head coach

- Anthony Evans (St. Thomas Aquinas)

Assistant coach(es)

- Chris Capko (South Florida)
- Mike Gillian (Adams State)
- Spencer Wright (Oklahoma Baptist)

Legend

- (C) Team captain
- (S) Suspended
- (I) Ineligible
- (W) Walk-on
- Injured
- Current redshirt

Roster

== Schedule ==
Date time, TV	Rank^{#}	Opponent^{#}	Result	Record	Site (attendance) city, state
Non-conference regular season
11/13/2015*; 7:00 pm		Trinity Baptist	W 71–39	1–0	FIU Arena (1,090); Miami, FL
11/16/2015*; 7:00 pm		Florida Memorial	W 67–51	2–0	FIU Arena (1,178); Miami, FL
11/20/2015*; 3:30 pm		at James Madison; Men Against Breast Cancer Classic	L 61–64	2–1	JMU Convocation Center (2,457); Harrisonburg, VA
11/21/2015*; 5:00 pm		vs. Tennessee–Martin; Men Against Breast Cancer Classic	W 69–62	3–1	JMU Convocation Center (2,628); Harrisonburg, VA
11/22/2015*; 1:00 pm		vs. Oral Roberts; Men Against Breast Cancer Classic	L 70–76 ^{OT}	3–2	JMU Convocation Center (2,292); Harrisonburg, VA
11/25/2015*; 7:00 pm, ASN		LIU Brooklyn	W 80–72	4–2	FIU Arena (869); Miami, FL
11/30/2015*; 7:00 pm, ASN		Stetson	L 75–81	4–3	FIU Arena (820); Miami, FL
12/04/2015*; 7:00 pm		Elon	L 71–77	4–4	FIU Arena (949); Miami, FL
12/06/2015*; 3:30 pm, ASN		Florida Gulf Coast	L 76–84 ^{OT}	4–5	FIU Arena (1,156); Miami, FL
12/14/2015*; 7:00 pm, ESPN3		at North Florida	L 72–94	4–6	UNF Arena (1,448); Jacksonville, FL
12/19/2015*; 3:00 pm		at Northern Illinois	L 75–78 ^{2OT}	4–7	Convocation Center (959); DeKalb, IL
12/22/2015*; 7:00 pm		at Binghamton	W 66–49	5–7	Binghamton University Events Center (1,602); Vestal, NY
12/29/2015*; 7:00 pm, ASN		Florida A&M	W 65–45	6–7	FIU Arena (923); Miami, FL
Conference USA regular season
01/03/2016; 3:00 pm, FSN		Florida Atlantic	W 76–59	7–7 (1–0)	FIU Arena (1,007); Miami, FL
01/07/2016; 8:00 pm		at WKU	W 75–72	8–7 (2–0)	E. A. Diddle Arena (3,394); Bowling Green, KY
01/09/2016; 7:00 pm		at Marshall	L 81–99	8–8 (2–1)	Cam Henderson Center (5,127); Huntington, WV
01/14/2016; 7:00 pm		Louisiana Tech	W 88–74	9–8 (3–1)	FIU Arena (1,240); Miami, FL
01/16/2016; 7:00 pm		Southern Miss	L 60–66	9–9 (3–2)	FIU Arena (1,258); Miami, FL
01/21/2016; 8:00 pm		at UTSA	W 72–56	10–9 (4–2)	Convocation Center (966); San Antonio, TX
01/23/2016; 9:05 pm		at UTEP	W 79–69	11–9 (5–2)	Don Haskins Center (7,688); El Paso, TX
01/28/2016; 7:00 pm, ASN		Charlotte	L 69–72	11–10 (5–3)	FIU Arena; Miami, FL
01/30/2016; 7:00 pm		Old Dominion	L 60–64	11–11 (5–4)	FIU Arena (1,209); Miami, FL
02/04/2016; 6:00 pm, ASN		at UAB	L 69–74	11–12 (5–5)	Bartow Arena (6,664); Birmingham, AL
02/06/2016; 7:00 pm		at Middle Tennessee	L 66–67	11–13 (5–6)	Murphy Center (2,598); Murfreesboro, TN
02/11/2016; 7:00 pm		UTEP	L 74–84	11–14 (5–7)	FIU Arena (936); Miami, FL
02/13/2016; 7:00 pm		UTSA	W 79–65	12–14 (6–7)	FIU Arena (1,062); Miami, FL
02/18/2016; 8:00 pm		at North Texas	L 75–77	12–15 (6–8)	The Super Pit (2,156); Denton, TX
02/20/2016; 2:00 pm, ASN		at Rice	L 70–86	12–16 (6–9)	Tudor Fieldhouse (3,859); Houston, TX
02/27/2016; 2:00 pm, ASN		at Florida Atlantic	W 71–63	13–16 (7–9)	FAU Arena; Boca Raton, FL
03/03/2016; 7:00 pm		UAB	L 60–77	13–17 (7–10)	FIU Arena (1,166); Miami, FL
03/05/2016; 7:00 pm		Middle Tennessee	L 58–61	13–18 (7–11)	FIU Arena (2,422); Miami, FL
Conference USA tournament
03/09/2016; 9:30 pm, ASN	(11)	vs. (6) UTEP; Second round	L 77–85	13–19	Legacy Arena (3,905); Birmingham, AL
*Non-conference game. ^{#}Rankings from AP Poll. (#) Tournament seedings in parentheses. All times are in Eastern Time.
