= 2015–16 Florida Atlantic Owls men's basketball team =

American college basketball season

2015–16 Florida Atlantic Owls men's basketball
- Conference: Conference USA
- Record: 8–25 (5–13 C-USA)
- Head coach: Michael Curry (2nd season)
- Assistant coaches: Eric Snow; Robbie Laing; Charlemagne Gibbons
- Home arena: FAU Arena

2015–16 Conference USA men's basketball standings
	Conf.				Overall
Team	W		L	PCT	W		L	PCT
UAB	16	–	2	.889	26	–	7	.788
Middle Tennessee †	13	–	5	.722	25	–	10	.714
Marshall	12	–	6	.667	17	–	16	.515
Louisiana Tech	12	–	6	.667	23	–	10	.697
Old Dominion	12	–	6	.667	25	–	13	.658
UTEP	10	–	8	.556	19	–	14	.576
Charlotte	9	–	9	.500	14	–	19	.424
Western Kentucky	8	–	10	.444	18	–	16	.529
North Texas	7	–	11	.389	12	–	20	.375
Rice	7	–	11	.389	12	–	20	.375
FIU	7	–	11	.389	13	–	19	.406
Florida Atlantic	5	–	13	.278	8	–	25	.242
Southern Miss*	5	–	13	.278	8	–	21	.276
UTSA	3	–	15	.167	5	–	27	.156
† 2016 C-USA Tournament winner *Ineligible for postseason play due to self-imposed postseason ban.

The 2015–16 Florida Atlantic Owls men's basketball team represented Florida Atlantic University during the 2015–16 NCAA Division I men's basketball season. The Owls, led by second year head coach Michael Curry, played their home games at the FAU Arena, and were members of Conference USA. They finished the season 8–25, 5–13 in C-USA play to finish in a tie for 12th place. They defeated UTSA in the first round of the C-USA tournament to advance to the second round where they lost to Old Dominion.

== Previous season ==
The Owls finished the 2014–15 season 9–20, 2–16 in C-USA play to finish in last place. They failed to qualify for the C-USA tournament.

== Departures ==
Name	Number	Pos.	Height	Weight	Year	Hometown	Notes
D'Andre Johnson	1	G	6'1"	185	Sophomore	Detroit, MI	Transferred to UT Permian Basin
Justin Massey	4	G	6'3"	185	Freshman	Cooper City, FL	Transferred to Brown
Justin Raffington	11	C	6'9"	255	RS Senior	Freiburg, Germany	Graduated
Maceo Baston	15	G	6'5"	185	Freshman	Detroit, MI	Transferred to Southeastern CC
Malcolm Laws	22	G	6'1"	195	Freshman	Orlando, FL	Walk-on; transferred to Nebraska
Brian Hornstein	24	F/C	7'0"	210	Senior	Dallas, TX	Graduated
Anthony Graves	30	G	6'2"	205	Senior	Pembroke Pines, FL	Graduated
Kelvin Penn	44	F	6'6"	233	Senior	Steilacoom, WA	Graduated
Grant Pelchen	50	C	6'11"	235	Sophomore	Jupiter, FL	Left the team for personal reasons

=== Incoming transfers ===
Name	Number	Pos.	Height	Weight	Year	Hometown	Previous School
Phillip Rankin		F	6'8"	230	Junior	Mobile, AL	Junior college transferred from Faulkner State Community College
Frank Booker	11	G	6'4"	193	Junior	Augusta, GA	Transferred from Oklahoma. Under NCAA transfer rules, Booker will have to sit out for the 2015–16 season. Will have two years of remaining eligibility.
Ronald Delph	33	C	7'0"	240	RS Sophomore	Winter Haven, FL	Transferred from Auburn at the start of the second semester during the 2014–15 season. Under NCAA transfer rules, Delph has to sit out for two semesters and will be eligible at the start of the second semester during the 2015–16 season. Delph have two and a half years of remaining eligibility.
Matthew Reed	50	F	6'9"	235	Junior	Tuscaloosa, AL	Junior college transferred from Shelton State Community College

== Recruiting class of 2015 ==
College recruiting information
Name	Hometown	School	Height	Weight	Commit date
Jessie Hill; PF	Point Pleasant Beach, NJ	Point Pleasant Beach High School	6 ft 8 in (2.03 m)	N/A	Nov 2, 2014
Jessie Hill; PF	Recruit ratings: Scout: Rivals: (NR)				
Connor Shorten; PF	Gladstone, NJ	Saint Benedict's Prep	6 ft 8 in (2.03 m)	230 lb (100 kg)	Nov 3, 2014
Connor Shorten; PF	Recruit ratings: Scout: Rivals: (NR)				
Jeantal Cylla; SF	Boynton Beach, FL	Lake Worth Christian High School	6 ft 6 in (1.98 m)	190 lb (86 kg)	Nov 20, 2014
Jeantal Cylla; SF	Recruit ratings: Scout: Rivals: (NR)				
Nick Rutherford; PG	Allen, TX	Allen High School	6 ft 3 in (1.91 m)	180 lb (82 kg)	Aug 8, 2014
Nick Rutherford; PG	Recruit ratings: Scout: Rivals: (NR)				
Overall recruit ranking:
Note: In many cases, Scout, Rivals, 247Sports, On3, and ESPN may conflict in their listings of height and weight.; In these cases, the average was taken. ESPN grades are on a 100-point scale.; Sources: "2015 Team Ranking". Rivals.

=== Recruiting class of 2016 ===
College recruiting information (2016)
Name	Hometown	School	Height	Weight	Commit date
Devorious Brown; SG	Madison, GA	Morgan County High School	6 ft 3 in (1.91 m)	180 lb (82 kg)	Oct 1, 2014
Devorious Brown; SG	Recruit ratings: Scout: Rivals: (NR)				
Overall recruit ranking:
Note: In many cases, Scout, Rivals, 247Sports, On3, and ESPN may conflict in their listings of height and weight.; In these cases, the average was taken. ESPN grades are on a 100-point scale.; Sources: "2016 Team Ranking". Rivals.

== Roster ==
2015–16 Florida Atlantic Owls men's basketball team
Players
Coaches

Pos.	#	Name	Height	Weight	Year	Previous school	Hometown
C	0	C. J. Turman	6 ft 9 in (2.06 m)	250 lb (113 kg)	So	Morgan County	Madison, GA
G	1	Jeantal Cylla	6 ft 6 in (1.98 m)	190 lb (86 kg)	Fr	Lake Worth	Lake Worth, TX
G	2	Marquan Botley	5 ft 10 in (1.78 m)	160 lb (73 kg)	Jr	Prestonwood Christian	Plano, TX
G	3	Adonis Filer	6 ft 3 in (1.91 m)	190 lb (86 kg)	RS Jr	Clemson	Chicago Heights, IL
F	5	Javier Lacunza	6 ft 9 in (2.06 m)	215 lb (98 kg)	Sr	Sagrado Corazon	Pamplona, Spain
G	10	Nick Rutherford	6 ft 3 in (1.91 m)	185 lb (84 kg)	Fr	Allen	Allen, TX
G	11	Frank Booker Jr. (I) (redshirt)	6 ft 4 in (1.93 m)	185 lb (84 kg)	Jr	Oklahoma	Augusta, GA
G	12	Jackson Trapp	6 ft 4 in (1.93 m)	200 lb (91 kg)	Sr	Fishburne Military School	Orlando, FL
G	22	Solomon Poole	6 ft 0 in (1.83 m)	185 lb (84 kg)	Sr	Georgia Tech	Jacksonville, FL
F	24	Jesse Hill	6 ft 8 in (2.03 m)	218 lb (99 kg)	Fr	Point Pleasant Beach	Waretown, NJ
F	30	Connor Shorten	6 ft 9 in (2.06 m)	230 lb (104 kg)	Fr	St. Benedict's Prep	Gladstone, NJ
C	33	Ronald Delph	7 ft 0 in (2.13 m)	235 lb (107 kg)	RS So	Auburn	Winter Haven, FL
F	50	Matthew Reed	6 ft 9 in (2.06 m)	235 lb (107 kg)	Jr	Shelton State CC	Cleveland, OH

Head coach

- Michael Curry (Georgia Southern)

Assistant coach(es)

- Eric Snow (Michigan State)
- Robbie Laing (Troy)
- Charlemagne Gibbons (Auburn Montgomery)

Legend

- (C) Team captain
- (S) Suspended
- (I) Ineligible
- (W) Walk-on
- Injured
- Current redshirt

Roster

== Schedule ==
Date time, TV	Rank^{#}	Opponent^{#}	Result	Record	Site (attendance) city, state
Exhibition
November 5, 2015*; 7:00 pm		St. Thomas	W 75–58		FAU Arena (1,218); Boca Raton, Florida
Non-conference regular season
November 13, 2015*; 7:00 pm, ESPN3		at No. 13 Michigan State	L 55–82	0–1	Breslin Center (14,797); East Lansing, MI
November 17, 2015*; 7:00 pm		Warner	L 72–75	0–2	FAU Arena (1,286); Boca Raton, Florida
November 20, 2015*; 5:00 pm		vs. Northeastern; Men Against Breast Cancer Classic	L 58–60	0–3	Millett Hall (1,255); Oxford, OH
November 21, 2015*; 3:30 pm		at Miami (OH); Men Against Breast Cancer Classic	W 75–69	1–3	Millett Hall (1,196); Oxford, OH
November 22, 2015*; 12:00 pm		vs. Lipscomb; Men Against Breast Cancer Classic	L 65–79	1–4	Millett Hall (1,224); Oxford, OH
December 1, 2015*; 7:00 pm, ESPN3		at East Carolina	L 48–74	1–5	Williams Arena (3,763); Greenville, NC
December 10, 2015*; 7:00 pm		Ave Maria	W 72–59	2–5	FAU Arena (962); Boca Raton, Florida
December 12, 2015*; 7:00 pm, ESPN3		at UCF	L 61–75	2–6	CFE Arena (4,130); Orlando, FL
December 15, 2015*; 7:00 pm		at Eastern Kentucky	L 73–80	2–7	Alumni Coliseum (1,250); Richmond, KY
December 16, 2015*; 7:00 pm		at Tennessee	L 62–81	2–8	Thompson–Boling Arena (12,309); Knoxville, TN
December 19, 2015*; 5:00 pm, FSFL		vs. Florida State; Orange Bowl Basketball Classic	L 59–64	2–9	BB&T Center (9,483); Sunrise, FL
December 22, 2015*; 7:00 pm		at Hofstra	L 54–68	2–10	Mack Sports Complex (961); Hempstead, NY
December 29, 2015*; 12:00 pm		Tennessee–Martin	L 48–57	2–11	FAU Arena (837); Boca Raton, Florida
Conference USA regular season
January 3, 2016; 3:00 pm, FSN		at FIU	L 59–76	2–12 (0–1)	FIU Arena (1,007); Miami, Florida
January 7, 2016; 7:00 pm		at Marshall	L 67–90	2–13 (0–2)	Cam Henderson Center (4,577); Huntington, WV
January 9, 2016; 8:00 pm		at WKU	L 82–86 ^{OT}	2–14 (0–3)	E. A. Diddle Arena (3,607); Bowling Green, KY
January 14, 2016; 7:00 pm, ASN		Southern Miss	W 58–51	3–14 (1–3)	FAU Arena (1,699); Boca Raton, Florida
January 16, 2016; 7:00 pm		Louisiana Tech	W 63–61	4–14 (2–3)	FAU Arena (1,198); Boca Raton, Florida
January 21, 2016; 9:00 pm		at UTEP	L 56–71	4–15 (2–4)	Don Haskins Center (6,054); El Paso, TX
January 23, 2016; 3:00 pm		at UTSA	W 86–71	5–15 (3–4)	Convocation Center (1,128); San Antonio, TX
January 28, 2016; 7:00 pm		Old Dominion	L 66–78	5–16 (3–5)	FAU Arena (1,517); Boca Raton, Florida
January 30, 2016; 2:00 pm, ASN		Charlotte	W 82–77	6–16 (4–5)	FAU Arena (936); Boca Raton, Florida
February 4, 2016; 7:30 pm		at Middle Tennessee	L 73–85	6–17 (4–6)	Murphy Center (5,411); Murfreesboro, TN
February 6, 2016; 8:00 pm		at UAB	L 67–104	6–18 (4–7)	Bartow Arena (6,211); Birmingham, AL
February 11, 2016; 7:00 pm		UTSA	W 79–73	7–18 (5–7)	FAU Arena (933); Boca Raton, Florida
February 13, 2016; 6:00 pm, ASN		UTEP	L 82–89	7–19 (5–8)	FAU Arena (1,254); Boca Raton, Florida
February 18, 2016; 8:00 pm		at Rice	L 85–90	7–20 (5–9)	Tudor Fieldhouse (1,400); Houston, TX
February 20, 2016; 8:00 pm		at North Texas	L 62–70	7–21 (5–10)	The Super Pit (1,466); Denton, TX
February 27, 2016; 2:00 pm, ASN		FIU	L 63–71	7–22 (5–11)	FAU Arena; Boca Raton, Florida
March 3, 2016; 7:00 pm		Middle Tennessee	L 59–76	7–23 (5–12)	FAU Arena (1,040); Boca Raton, Florida
March 5, 2016; 12:00 pm, ASN		UAB	L 70–73	7–24 (5–13)	FAU Arena (729); Boca Raton, Florida
Conference USA tournament
March 8, 2016; 5:00 pm, ASN	(12)	vs. (13) UTSA; First round	W 82–58	8–24	Bartow Arena (220); Birmingham, AL
March 9, 2016; 3:30 pm, ASN	(12)	vs. (5) Old Dominion; Second round	W 72–46	8–25	Legacy Arena (3,888); Birmingham, AL
*Non-conference game. ^{#}Rankings from AP Poll. (#) Tournament seedings in parentheses. All times are in Eastern Time.
