= Reggie Upshaw =

American basketball player

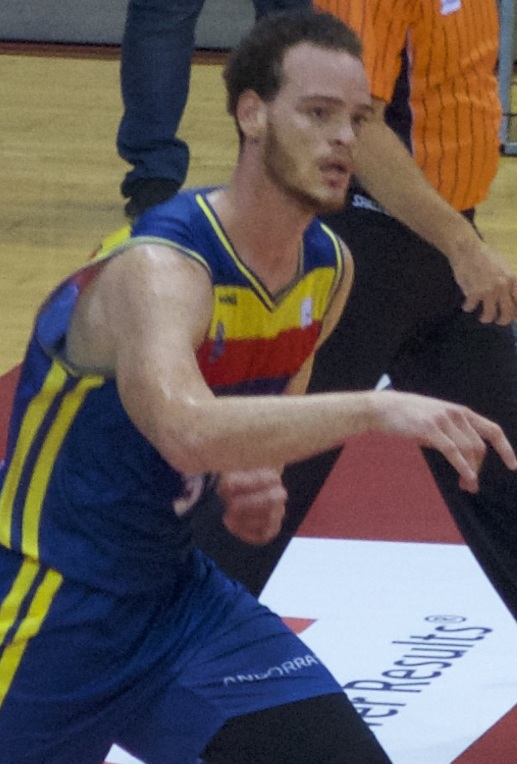
- Upshaw with MoraBanc Andorra in 2018

Personal information
- Born: April 7, 1995 (age 31) Chattanooga, Tennessee, U.S.
- Listed height: 203 cm (6 ft 8 in)
- Listed weight: 103 kg (227 lb)

Career information
- High school: Baylor (Chattanooga, Tennessee)
- College: Middle Tennessee (2013–2017)
- NBA draft: 2017: undrafted
- Playing career: 2017–present
- Position: Small forward

Career history
- 2017–2018: Tigers Tübingen
- 2018–2019: Andorra
- 2019–2020: Pallacanestro Reggiana
- 2020: Maccabi Haifa
- 2020–2021: Hapoel Tel Aviv
- 2021–2022: Budivelnyk
- 2022: Mitteldeutscher BC
- 2022: Wellington Saints
- 2022–2024: Antwerp Giants

Career highlights
- Belgian Cup winner (2023); Second-team All-Conference USA (2017); Third-team All-Conference USA (2016); C-USA All-Defensive Team (2017); Conference USA tournament MVP (2016)

Reginald Eugene Upshaw Jr. (born April 7, 1995) is an American professional basketball player. He competed in college for Middle Tennessee State University.

== Early life ==
Upshaw is the son of Sabrina and Reggie Upshaw Sr., who played football at Middle Tennessee State University. The younger Reggie Upshaw attended the Baylor School in Chattanooga, Tennessee, where he was a multi-sport athlete, winning a state high jump championship and earning all-state honors in football and basketball as a junior. Playing wide receiver and tight end in football, Upshaw had scholarship offers from Vanderbilt, Middle Tennessee and Louisiana–Lafayette. However, he suffered a broken right foot at the end of his season and another fracture at the beginning of his basketball season, prompting him to focus on basketball in the future. As a senior, Upshaw averaged 22 points, 12 rebounds and three blocks per game on the basketball court. He was considered to be a three-star recruit and received attention from several Division I programs before committing to Middle Tennessee and coach Kermit Davis.

== College career ==
In Upshaw's freshman season, he averaged 6.4 points and 3.5 rebounds per game. As a sophomore, Upshaw averaged 9.9 points and 7.0 rebounds per game. The Blue Raiders finished the season 19–16 and lost in the first round of the CollegeInsider.com Tournament.

In his junior season, Upshaw was named to the All-Conference USA third team. Middle Tennessee won the Conference USA tournament, defeating Old Dominion 55–53 in the final. Upshaw, who scored nine points in the championship game including the final four points, was named Most Valuable Player. In the NCAA Tournament, the Blue Raiders were given a 15 seed and matched up with 2 seed Tom Izzo-coached Michigan State. In one of the biggest surprises in the history of the NCAA Tournament, the Blue Raiders beat the highly touted Spartans 90–81, with a strong performance by Upshaw, who scored 21 points as his team's top scorer. It was Middle Tennessee's first NCAA Tournament win since 1989. In the following round, however, they lost by 25 points against Syracuse, with Upshaw shooting 1-for-10 and dishing out one assist. Upshaw averaged 13.7 points, 8.5 rebounds and 2.2 assists per game as a junior. After the season, he underwent wrist surgery.

As a senior at Middle Tennessee, Upshaw averaged 14.5 points and 6.8 rebounds per game. Upshaw was named to the All-Conference USA second team. Alongside JaCorey Williams, he led the Blue Raiders to the NCAA Tournament again. As a #12 seed, the Blue Raiders earned a first-round win against #5 seed Minnesota. In a game in which Middle Tennessee was the betting favorite despite its lower seed, the Blue Raiders won 81–72 behind a game-high 19 points from Upshaw. In the next round, the Blue Raiders fell to Butler 74–65. Upshaw was selected to play in the 2017 Reese's College All-Star Game.

== Professional career ==
After going undrafted in the 2017 NBA draft, Upshaw joined the Milwaukee Bucks for the 2017 NBA Summer League. He then moved to Germany to begin his professional career with the Tigers Tübingen of the Basketball Bundesliga. Upshaw averaged 14.4 points, 6.7 rebounds, and 2.2 assists per game during the 2017–18 season.

In July 2018, Upshaw played for the Los Angeles Clippers during the 2018 NBA Summer League. He later moved to Spain for the 2018–19 season, where he played for BC Andorra of the Liga ACB.

On July 30, 2019, Upshaw signed with Grissin Bon Reggio Emilia of the Italian Lega Basket Serie A (LBA). He averaged 11.9 points and 6.3 rebounds per game during the 2019–20 season.

On May 27, 2020, Upshaw signed with Maccabi Haifa of the Israeli Premier League. He averaged 13.9 points and 7.6 rebounds per game during their post-COVID season return.

On August 15, 2020, Upshaw signed with Hapoel Tel Aviv. He averaged 11.7 points, 6.3 rebounds, and 1.1 assists per game during the 2020–21 season.

On August 13, 2021, Upshaw signed with Budivelnyk Kyiv of the Ukrainian Basketball SuperLeague. In January 2022, he left Ukraine and signed with Mitteldeutscher BC of the German Basketball Bundesliga.

In July 2022, Upshaw joined the Wellington Saints for the rest of the 2022 New Zealand NBL season.

On August 12, 2022, he has signed with Telenet Giants Antwerp of the Belgian BNXT League. On 12 March 2023, Upshaw and the Giants won the Belgian Cup after beating BC Oostende in the final. He scored 9 points in the final. Reggie retired from playing in 2023, and is currently working on the coaching staff at his alma mater, MTSU.

== Career statistics ==
Legend
GP	Games played	GS	Games started	MPG	Minutes per game
FG%	Field goal percentage	3P%	3-point field goal percentage	FT%	Free throw percentage
RPG	Rebounds per game	APG	Assists per game	SPG	Steals per game
BPG	Blocks per game	PPG	Points per game	**Bold**	Career high

=== College ===
Year	Team	GP	GS	MPG	FG%	3P%	FT%	RPG	APG	SPG	BPG	PPG
2013–14	Middle Tennessee	33	20	20.5	.459	.286	.516	3.5	1.2	.8	.5	6.4
2014–15	Middle Tennessee	**36**	24	29.1	.440	.288	.648	7.0	1.6	1.0	**1.0**	9.9
2015–16	Middle Tennessee	35	35	31.2	.497	**.380**	.494	**8.5**	2.2	**1.5**	.8	13.7
2016–17	Middle Tennessee	**36**	**36**	**32.0**	**.525**	.317	**.724**	6.8	**2.4**	1.1	.9	**14.5**
Career		140	115	28.3	.486	.323	.598	6.5	1.8	1.1	.8	11.2
