= James Kelly (basketball) =

American basketball player (born 1993)

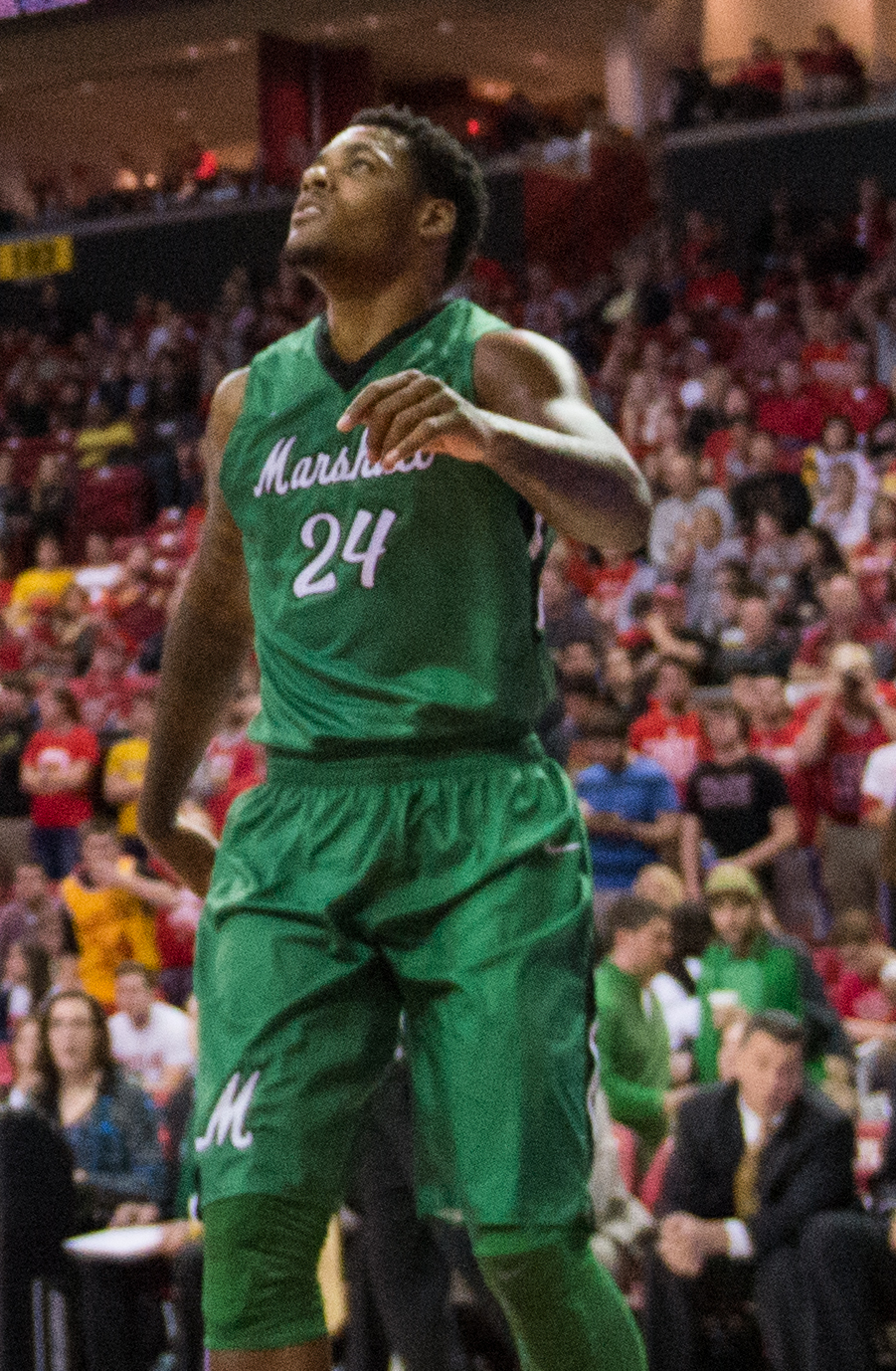

Personal information
- Born: August 12, 1993 (age 33)
- Listed height: 6 ft 8 in (2.03 m)
- Listed weight: 240 lb (109 kg)

Career information
- High school: Pioneer (Ann Arbor, Michigan)
- College: Owens CC (2011–2013); Miami (Florida) (2013–2014); Marshall (2015–2016)
- NBA draft: 2016: undrafted
- Playing career: 2016–2023
- Position: Center / power forward

Career history
- 2016–2017: Incheon Electroland Elephants
- 2017–2018: Changwon LG Sakers
- 2018–2019: Hapoel Gilboa Galil
- 2019–2021: Maccabi Rishon LeZion
- 2021: Detroit Hustle
- 2021–2022: Aris Thessaloniki
- 2022–2023: Birmingham Squadron

Career highlights
- C-USA Newcomer of the Year (2016); First-team All-C-USA (2016)

James Kelly (born August 12, 1993) is an American professional basketball player who last played for the Birmingham Squadron of the NBA G League. He played college basketball for Owens Community College, University of Miami and Marshall University before playing professionally in South Korea, Israel and Greece.

== High school career ==
Kelly started playing basketball junior year of high school, after a four-inch growth spurt. He attended Pioneer High School in Ann Arbor, Michigan, where he averaged 15 points, eight rebounds, two steals, two blocks and one assist per game and was named the league MVP.

== College career ==
Kelly played two years at Owens Community College, where he averaged 17.9 points, 10 rebounds, 1 assist, 1.5 steals and 1.5 blocks per game, becoming the first player in program history to record 1,000 points, 600 rebounds, 100 steals and 100 blocks in his career. Kelly was named First Team All-Ohio Community College Athletic Conference (OCCAC), First Team All-Region XII and NJCAA D-II Second Team All-American as a sophomore. His time at Owens resulted in a National Top 100 Junior College Ranking and he was considered one of the top Junior College recruits in the country for the 2013 class.

In his junior year, Kelly played at University of Miami, after deciding between Michigan State, West Virginia, and New Mexico. He went on to average 6.0 points, 3.7 rebounds in 17.9 minutes, shooting 40.5 percent from 3-point range. On May 16, 2014, Kelly was transferred from Miami to Marshall, but sat out first season at Marshall per NCAA Transfer rules.

In his senior year at Marshall, Kelly led the team in scoring (20.1 points per game), rebounding (9.8 per game), steals (1.3 per game) and blocks (1.1 per game), becoming one of two players in Herd history to record at least 600 points and 300 rebounds in a single season, the first player to do so at Marshall in over Four Decades. Kelly was named three-time Conference USA Player of the Week (On December 28, January 11 and February 22), C-USA Newcomer of the Year and First-team All-C-USA. He is considered to have one of the best single seasons in Marshall History and one of the greatest players to ever play for Marshall. At the conclusion of the season he was invited to play at the Portsmouth 64 which features the top seniors in the country.

== Professional career ==
=== Inchon ET Land Elephants (2016–2017) ===
After going undrafted in the 2016 NBA draft, Kelly joined the Charlotte Hornets for the 2016 NBA Summer League.

On July 20, 2016, Kelly was selected with the 8th overall pick in the 2016 Korean Basketball League Draft by the Incheon ET Land Elephants. In 34 games played for the Elephants, Kelly finished as the KBL fifth-leading scorer with 23.2 points, and also averaged 10.1 rebounds, 1.6 assists, 1.5 steals and 1 block per game.

=== Changwon LG Sakers (2017–2018) ===
On November 7, 2017, Kelly signed a one-year deal with the Changwon LG Sakers. On December 7, 2017, Kelly recorded a double-double with a career-high 46 points and 12 rebounds, shooting 21-of-30 from the field, in a 93–94 loss to Anyang KGC. In 45 games played for the Sakers, Kelly finished as the KBL third-leading rebounder with 11 per game, and also averaged 21.3 points, 1.4 assists and 1 steal per game.

=== Hapoel Gilboa Galil (2018–2019) ===
On July 9, 2018, Kelly signed with the French team Levallois Metropolitans. However, one month later, he parted ways with Levallois before appearing in a game for them.

On September 3, 2018, Kelly signed with the Israeli team Hapoel Gilboa Galil for the 2018–19 season. On February 4, 2019, Kelly recorded 26 points, shooting 12-for-16 from the field, along with six rebounds, four assists and three blocks, leading Gilboa Galil to an 89–87 win over Ironi Nahariya. He was subsequently named Israeli League Round 17 MVP. In 33 games played for Gilboa Galil, he averaged 15.1 points, 7.9 rebounds, 1.7 assists and 1.1 steals per game, while shooting .578 (211-of-365) from the floor.

=== Maccabi Rishon LeZion (2019–2020) ===
On November 19, 2019, Kelly signed a one-month deal with Maccabi Rishon LeZion as an injury cover for Darryl Monroe. On December 18, 2019, Kelly recorded a season-high 27 points, while shooting 12-of-17 from the field, along with 12 rebounds, four assists and four steals for 40 PIR in a 96–92 overtime win over ratiopharm Ulm. He was named the EuroCup round 10 MVP.

=== Detroit Hustle (2021) ===
In 2021, Kelly signed with the Detroit Hustle of The Basketball League.

=== Aris Thessaloniki (2021–2022) ===
On October 26, 2021, Kelly signed with Aris of the Greek Basket League. In 14 games (he was absent for a period of two months due to a pressing family matter overseas), he averaged 14.9 points, 8.6 rebounds, 1.6 assists, 0.6 blocks and 1.4 steals, playing around 27 minutes per contest.

=== Birmingham Squadron (2022–2023) ===
On November 4, 2022, Kelly was named to the opening night roster for the Birmingham Squadron.
