= 2015–16 Arkansas State Red Wolves men's basketball team =

American college basketball season

2015–16 Arkansas State Red Wolves men's basketball
- Conference: Sun Belt Conference
- Record: 11–20 (7–13 Sun Belt)
- Head coach: John Brady (8th season)
- Assistant coaches: Melvin Haralson; Carlos Wilson; Mike Scutero
- Home arena: Convocation Center

2015–16 Sun Belt Conference men's basketball standings
	Conf.				Overall
Team	W		L	PCT	W		L	PCT
Little Rock †	17	–	3	.850	30	–	5	.857
Louisiana–Monroe	15	–	5	.750	20	–	14	.588
Texas–Arlington	13	–	7	.650	24	–	11	.686
Louisiana–Lafayette	12	–	8	.600	19	–	15	.559
Georgia Southern	10	–	10	.500	14	–	17	.452
Georgia State	9	–	11	.450	16	–	14	.533
Texas State	8	–	12	.400	15	–	16	.484
South Alabama	8	–	12	.400	14	–	19	.424
Arkansas State	7	–	13	.350	11	–	20	.355
Appalachian State	7	–	13	.350	9	–	22	.290
Troy	4	–	16	.200	9	–	22	.290
† 2016 Sun Belt Conference tournament winner

The 2015–16 Arkansas State Red Wolves men's basketball team represented Arkansas State University during the 2015–16 NCAA Division I men's basketball season. The Red Wolves, led by eighth year head coach John Brady, played their home games at the Convocation Center, and were members of the Sun Belt Conference. They finished the season 11–20, 7–13 in Sun Belt play to finish in a tie for ninth place. They failed to qualify for the Sun Belt tournament.

Prior to the season, head coach John Brady announced his intentions to resign following the season. On March 16, 2016, the school hired former Baylor assistant Grant McCasland as the new head coach.

== Previous season ==
The Redwolves finished the 2014–15 season 11–29, 6–14 in Sun Belt play to finish in 10th place. They failed to qualify for the Sun Belt tournament.

== Roster ==
Number	Name	Position	Height	Weight	Year	Hometown
2	Connor Kern	Guard	6–4	196	RS–Freshman	Pickerington, Ohio
3	Devin Carter	Guard	6–5	205	RS–Junior	Champaign, Illinois
4	Josh Pierre	Guard	6–0	190	Senior	Baton Rouge, Louisiana
10	Frederic Dure	Guard	6–5	175	Senior	Montreal, Quebec, Canada
11	Charles Waters	Guard	6–6	200	Senior	Memphis, Tennessee
12	Sean Gardner	Guard	6–5	195	RS–Senior	Memphis, Tennessee
13	C.J. Foster	Guard	6–3	185	Junior	Lilburn, Georgia
14	Kelvin Downs	Forward	6–9	230	Senior	Arlington, Texas
24	Donte Thomas	Guard	6–3	210	Junior	Dallas
33	Nouhoum Bocoum	Center	6–10	260	Senior	Harlem, New York
42	PJ Hardwick	Guard	5–10	167	RS–Junior	Miami
50	Anthony Livingstone	Forward	6–8	230	Junior	Washington, D.C.

== Schedule and results ==
Date time, TV	Opponent	Result	Record	Site (attendance) city, state
Exhibition
11/09/2015*; 7:00 pm	Henderson State	W 89–79		Convocation Center (987); Jonesboro, Arkansas
Non-conference regular season
11/13/2015*; 8:00 pm, FSMW	at SIU Edwardsville	L 70–79	0–1	Vadalabene Center (1,592); Edwardsville, Illinois
11/16/2015*; 7:00 pm	Lyon	W 81–37	1–1	Convocation Center (904); Jonesboro, Arkansas
11/18/2015*; 6:00 pm	at Savannah State; Global Sports Shootout	L 75–76	1–2	Tiger Arena (1,440); Savannah, Georgia
11/22/2015*; 2:30 pm	Jackson State; Global Sports Shootout	W 78–69	2–2	Convocation Center (789); Jonesboro, Arkansas
11/25/2015*; 6:00 pm, P12N	at No. 21 Oregon; Global Sports Shootout	L 68–91	2–3	Matthew Knight Arena (5,465); Eugene, Oregon
11/27/2015*; 12:00 pm, FSSW	at Baylor; Global Sports Shootout	L 72–94	2–4	Ferrell Center (4,768); Waco, Texas
12/01/2015*; 8:00 pm, SECN	at Missouri	L 78–88	2–5	Mizzou Arena (5,104); Columbia, Missouri
12/04/2015*; 7:00 pm	North Dakota State	L 73–74	2–6	Convocation Center (1,054); Jonesboro, Arkansas
12/12/2015*; 7:30 pm	UA–Monticello	W 104–71	3–6	Convocation Center (1,222); Jonesboro, Arkansas
12/18/2015*; 6:00 pm	at UT Martin	L 70–74	3–7	Skyhawk Arena (811); Martin, Tennessee
12/22/2015*; 7:00 pm	Central Arkansas	W 77–67	4–7	Convocation Center (1,040); Jonesboro, Arkansas
Sun Belt regular season
12/30/2015; 7:30 pm	at Troy	W 84–81	5–7 (1–0)	Trojan Arena (1,452); Troy, Alabama
01/02/2016; 4:00 pm	at South Alabama	W 89–67	6–7 (2–0)	Mitchell Center (1,808); Mobile, Alabama
01/07/2016; 7:30 pm	Louisiana–Monroe	W 68–65 ^{OT}	7–7 (3–0)	Convocation Center (1,385); Jonesboro, Arkansas
01/09/2016; 7:00 pm	Louisiana–Lafayette	W 71–69	8–7 (4–0)	Convocation Center (2,019); Jonesboro, Arkansas
01/16/2016; 7:00 pm, ESPN3	Appalachian State	L 72–86	8–8 (4–1)	Convocation Center (1,615); Jonesboro, Arkansas
01/18/2016; 7:30 pm, ESPN3	Arkansas–Little Rock	W 76–73	9–8 (5–1)	Convocation Center (2,136); Jonesboro, Arkansas
01/21/2016; 7:15 pm	at UT Arlington	L 64–91	9–9 (5–2)	College Park Center (3,111); Arlington, Texas
01/23/2016; 4:30 pm	at Texas State	L 68–78	9–10 (5–3)	Strahan Coliseum (2,857); San Marcos, Texas
01/28/2016; 7:30 pm, ESPN3	Georgia State	W 75–69 ^{OT}	10–10 (6–3)	Convocation Center (1,719); Jonesboro, Arkansas
01/30/2016; 7:00 pm, ESPN3	Georgia Southern	L 66–71	10–11 (6–4)	Convocation Center (1,572); Jonesboro, Arkansas
02/04/2016; 7:30 pm, ESPN3	South Alabama	W 79–73 ^{OT}	11–11 (7–4)	Convocation Center (1,526); Jonesboro, Arkansas
02/06/2016; 7:00 pm, ESPN3	Troy	L 70–71	11–12 (7–5)	Convocation Center (1,627); Jonesboro, Arkansas
02/11/2016; 7:15 pm	at Louisiana–Lafayette	L 73–83	11–13 (7–6)	Cajundome (4,420); Lafayette, Louisiana
02/13/2016; 4:00 pm	at Louisiana–Monroe	L 73–78 ^{OT}	11–14 (7–7)	Fant–Ewing Coliseum (3,792); Monroe, Louisiana
02/18/2016; 6:30 pm	at Georgia Southern	L 59–90	11–15 (7–8)	Hanner Fieldhouse (1,849); Statesboro, Georgia
02/20/2016; 1:30 pm, ESPN3	at Georgia State	L 61–69	11–16 (7–9)	GSU Sports Arena (1,468); Atlanta
02/25/2016; 7:30 pm, ESPN3	Texas State	L 60–71	11–17 (7–10)	Convocation Center (1,470); Jonesboro, Arkansas
02/27/2016; 7:00 pm, ESPN3	UT Arlington	L 75–79	11–18 (7–11)	Convocation Center (1,644); Jonesboro, Arkansas
03/01/2016; 7:15 pm	Arkansas–Little Rock	L 80–89	11–19 (7–12)	Jack Stephens Center (5,619); Little Rock, Arkansas
03/05/2016; 2:30 pm, ESPN3	at Appalachian State	L 73–80	11–20 (7–13)	Holmes Center (1,618); Boone, North Carolina
*Non-conference game. ^{#}Rankings from AP Poll. (#) Tournament seedings in parentheses. All times are in Central Time Source.
