= 2015–16 UT Arlington Mavericks men's basketball team =

American college basketball season

2015–16 UT Arlington Mavericks men's basketball

CIT, Quarterfinals
- Conference: Sun Belt Conference
- Record: 24–11 (13–7 Sun Belt)
- Head coach: Scott Cross (10th season)
- Assistant coaches: Greg Young; Zak Buncik; Kenneth Mangrum
- Home arena: College Park Center

2015–16 Sun Belt Conference men's basketball standings
	Conf.				Overall
Team	W		L	PCT	W		L	PCT
Little Rock †	17	–	3	.850	30	–	5	.857
Louisiana–Monroe	15	–	5	.750	20	–	14	.588
Texas–Arlington	13	–	7	.650	24	–	11	.686
Louisiana–Lafayette	12	–	8	.600	19	–	15	.559
Georgia Southern	10	–	10	.500	14	–	17	.452
Georgia State	9	–	11	.450	16	–	14	.533
Texas State	8	–	12	.400	15	–	16	.484
South Alabama	8	–	12	.400	14	–	19	.424
Arkansas State	7	–	13	.350	11	–	20	.355
Appalachian State	7	–	13	.350	9	–	22	.290
Troy	4	–	16	.200	9	–	22	.290
† 2016 Sun Belt Conference tournament winner

The 2015–16 Texas–Arlington Mavericks men's basketball team represented the University of Texas at Arlington during the 2015–16 NCAA Division I men's basketball season. The Mavericks, led by tenth year head coach Scott Cross, played their home games at the College Park Center and were a member of the Sun Belt Conference. They finished the season 24–11, 13–7 in Sun Belt play to finish in third place. They defeated Texas State to advance to the semifinals of the Sun Belt tournament where they lost to Louisiana–Monroe. They were invited to the CollegeInsider.com Tournament where they defeated Savannah State in the first round (the Mavericks' first ever post-season win in any tournament), received a second round bye and lost in the quarterfinals to NJIT. The 24 wins tied the 2011 team for most in a single Maverick season.

== Roster ==
Number	Name	Position	Height	Weight	Year	Hometown
1	Erick Neal	Guard	5–11	160	Sophomore	Dallas, Texas
2	Kennedy Eubanks	Forward	6–6	185	Senior	Pendleton, South Carolina
3	Nathan Hawkins	Guard	6–7	208	Sophomore	Garland, Texas
4	Drew Charles	Guard	6–2	193	Junior	Azle, Texas
5	Kaelon Wilson	Guard	6–2	180	Sophomore	Lancaster, Texas
10	Jalen Jones	Guard	6–3	200	Junior	Cedar Hill, Texas
11	Brandon Williams	Forward	6–10	215	Junior	Houston, Texas
12	Courtney Austin	Guard	6–0	185	Senior	Dallas, Texas
15	Scott Muirhead	Forward	6–4	200	Freshman	Ennis, Texas
20	Julian Harris	Forward	6–5	220	Sophomore	Mansfield, Texas
23	Mairega Clarke	Guard	6–5	165	Junior	Queens, New York
25	Kevin Hervey	Forward	6–7	210	Sophomore	Arlington, Texas
30	Nick Pallas	Guard	6–8	240	Freshman	Rancho Santa Margarita, California
34	Faith Pope	Forward	6–7	195	Junior	Houston, Texas
45	Jorge Bilbao	Forward	6–8	235	Junior	Bilbao, Spain

== Schedule ==
Date time, TV	Opponent	Result	Record	Site (attendance) city, state
Summer Tour of the Bahamas
08/20/2015*; 6:00 pm	at Real Deal Shockers	W 93–67		Sir Kendal Isaacs Gym; Nassau, Bahamas
08/21/2015*; 6:00 pm	at PJ Stringers	W 114–64		Sir Kendal Isaacs Gym; Nassau, Bahamas
08/23/2015*; 3:00 pm	at Providence Storm	W 108–61		Sir Kendal Isaacs Gym; Nassau, Bahamas
08/24/2015*; 6:00 pm	at Atlantis All–Stars	W 109–77		Sir Kendal Isaacs Gym; Nassau, Bahamas
Regular season
11/14/2015*; 7:30 pm	Fordham	W 77–72	1–0	College Park Center (3,863); Arlington, TX
11/17/2015*; 6:30 pm	at Louisiana Tech; Hoophall Miami Invitational	L 68–80	1–1	Thomas Assembly Center (3,012); Ruston, LA
11/20/2015*; 6:00 pm, ESPN3	at Ohio State; Hoophall Miami Invitational	W 73-68	2-1	Value City Arena (12,312); Columbus, OH
11/23/2015*; 7:30 pm, ESPNews	at Memphis; Hoophall Miami Invitational	W 68–64	3–1	FedExForum (11,184); Memphis, TN
11/25/2015*; 7:00 pm	Grambling State; Hoophall Miami Invitational	W 73–40	4–1	College Park Center (1,601); Arlington, TX
11/29/2015*; 5:00 pm	at Rice	W 92–74	5–1	Tudor Fieldhouse (1,668); Houston, TX
12/01/2015*; 7:00 pm, LHN	at Texas	L 73–80 ^{OT}	5–2	Frank Erwin Center (9,646); Austin, TX
12/03/2015*; 7:00 pm	North Texas	W 90–67	6–2	College Park Center (6,107); Arlington, TX
12/05/2015*; 8:00 pm	at UTEP	W 76–62	7–2	Don Haskins Center (7,567); El Paso, TX
12/08/2015*; 7:00 pm	Bradley	W 97–61	8–2	College Park Center (1,833); Arlington, TX
12/21/2015*; 7:00 pm	Sul Ross State	W 98–40	9–2	College Park Center (1,855); Arlington, TX
12/30/2015; 7:15 pm	Georgia State	W 85–70	10–2 (1–0)	College Park Center (3,002); Arlington, TX
01/02/2016; 7:15 pm	Georgia Southern	W 92–72	11–2 (2–0)	College Park Center (2,117); Arlington, TX
01/07/2016; 6:30 pm, ESPN3	at Appalachian State	W 71–67	12–2 (3–0)	Holmes Center (870); Boone, NC
01/14/2016; 7:30 pm	at Troy	W 90–63	13–2 (4–0)	Trojan Arena (1,209); Troy, AL
01/16/2016; 4:00 pm	at South Alabama	L 85–88 ^{OT}	13–3 (4–1)	Mitchell Center (2,102); Mobile, AL
01/21/2016; 7:15 pm	Arkansas State	W 91–64	14–3 (5–1)	College Park Center (3,111); Arlington, TX
01/23/2016; 7:15 pm	Arkansas–Little Rock	L 62–68	14–4 (5–2)	College Park Center (5,033); Arlington, TX
01/28/2016; 7:00 pm	at Louisiana–Monroe	L 88–99	14–5 (5–3)	Fant–Ewing Coliseum (3,857); Monroe, LA
01/30/2016; 4:15 pm	at Louisiana–Lafayette	L 75–90	14–6 (5–4)	Cajundome (3,989); Lafayette, LA
02/04/2016; 6:30 pm	at Georgia Southern	L 73–82	14–7 (5–5)	Hanner Fieldhouse (1,668); Statesboro, GA
02/06/2016; 1:30 pm, ESPN3	at Georgia State	W 90–69	15–7 (6–5)	GSU Sports Arena (1,579); Atlanta, GA
02/09/2016; 8:00 pm, ESPN2	at Texas State	W 65–53	16–7 (7–5)	Strahan Coliseum (3,408); San Marcos, TX
02/13/2016; 7:15 pm	Appalachian State	W 91–60	17–7 (8–5)	College Park Center (2,141); Arlington, TX
02/18/2016; 7:15 pm	Louisiana–Lafayette	W 84–83 ^{OT}	18–7 (9–5)	College Park Center (2,010); Arlington, TX
02/20/2016; 7:15 pm, ESPN3	Louisiana–Monroe	L 61–64	18–8 (9–6)	College Park Center (3,314); Arlington, TX
02/25/2016; 7:15 pm	at Arkansas–Little Rock	L 60–72	18–9 (9–7)	Jack Stephens Center (5,253); Little Rock, AR
02/27/2016; 7:00 pm	at Arkansas State	W 79–75	19–9 (10–7)	Convocation Center (1,644); Jonesboro, AR
03/01/2016; 7:15 pm	Texas State	W 75–69	20–9 (11–7)	College Park Center (2,196); Arlington, TX
03/03/2016; 7:15 pm	South Alabama	W 92–79	21–9 (12–7)	College Park Center (2,408); Arlington, TX
03/05/2016; 7:15 pm	Troy	W 90–55	22–9 (13–7)	College Park Center (2,722); Arlington, TX
Sun Belt tournament
03/11/2016; 7:30 pm, ESPN3	vs. Texas State; Quarterfinals	W 72–63	23–9	Lakefront Arena (907); New Orleans, LA
03/12/2016; 3:30 pm, ESPN3	vs. Louisiana–Monroe; Semifinals	L 71–82	23–10	Lakefront Arena; New Orleans, LA
CIT
03/16/2016*; 6:00 pm	at Savannah State; First round	W 75–59	24–10	Tiger Arena (1,192); Savannah, GA
03/24/2016*; 6:30 pm, ESPN3	at NJIT; Quarterfinals	L 60–63	24–11	Fleisher Center (1,383); Newark, NJ
*Non-conference game. ^{#}Rankings from AP Poll. (#) Tournament seedings in parentheses. All times are in Central Time.
