= 2015–16 Louisiana–Lafayette Ragin' Cajuns men's basketball team =

American college basketball season

2015–16 Louisiana–Lafayette Ragin' Cajuns men's basketball

CIT, Quarterfinals
- Conference: Sun Belt Conference
- Record: 19–15 (12–8 Sun Belt)
- Head coach: Bob Marlin (6th season)
- Assistant coaches: Neil Hardin; Kevin Johnson; Gus Hauser
- Home arena: Cajundome

2015–16 Sun Belt Conference men's basketball standings
	Conf.				Overall
Team	W		L	PCT	W		L	PCT
Little Rock †	17	–	3	.850	30	–	5	.857
Louisiana–Monroe	15	–	5	.750	20	–	14	.588
Texas–Arlington	13	–	7	.650	24	–	11	.686
Louisiana–Lafayette	12	–	8	.600	19	–	15	.559
Georgia Southern	10	–	10	.500	14	–	17	.452
Georgia State	9	–	11	.450	16	–	14	.533
Texas State	8	–	12	.400	15	–	16	.484
South Alabama	8	–	12	.400	14	–	19	.424
Arkansas State	7	–	13	.350	11	–	20	.355
Appalachian State	7	–	13	.350	9	–	22	.290
Troy	4	–	16	.200	9	–	22	.290
† 2016 Sun Belt Conference tournament winner

The 2015–16 Louisiana–Lafayette Ragin' Cajuns men's basketball team represented the University of Louisiana at Lafayette during the 2015–16 NCAA Division I men's basketball season. The Ragin' Cajuns, led by sixth year head coach Bob Marlin, played their home games at the Cajundome and were members of the Sun Belt Conference. They finished the season 19–15, 12–8 in Sun Belt play to finish in fourth place. They defeated South Alabama to advance to the semifinals of the Sun Belt tournament where they lost to Arkansas–Little Rock. They were invited to the CollegeInsider.com Tournament where they defeated Texas A&M–Corpus Christi and Furman to advance to the quarterfinals where they lost to UC Irvine.

== Roster ==
2015–16 Louisiana–Lafayette Ragin' Cajuns Men's Basketball Roster
Number	Name	Position	Height	Weight	Year	Hometown
--	Kadavion Evans	Guard	5–11	165	Freshman	Shreveport, Louisiana
0	Devonta Walker	Forward	6–7	220	Senior	Salisbury, Maryland
1	Jay Wright	Guard	6–1	180	Junior	Rincon, Georgia
3	Tyrone Wooten	Guard	6–4	180	Junior	Memphis, Tennessee
4	Steven Wronkoski	Guard	6–5	190	Senior	Hammond, Louisiana
5	Kasey Shepherd	Guard	6–3	178	Senior	Houston, Texas
11	Matt Marlin	Guard	6–0	170	Senior	Huntsville, Texas
13	Hayward Register	Guard	6–2	175	Junior	Lafayette, Louisiana
15	Jay Hedgeman	Forward	6–7	190	Junior	Pearland, Texas
21	Shawn Long	Forward	6–11	246	Senior	Morgan City, Louisiana
22	Johnathan Stove	Guard	6–4	215	Sophomore	Baton Rouge, Louisiana
23	Tiremone Williams	Guard	6–0	180	Senior	Abbeville, Louisiana
25	Elijah McGuire	Guard	5–11	205	Sophomore	Houma, Louisiana
31	Frank Bartley	Guard	6–3	200	Junior	Baton Rouge, Louisiana
32	Bryce Washington	Forward	6–6	255	Sophomore	New Orleans, Louisiana
33	Garrett Capps	Forward	6–6	210	Freshman	Flower Mound, Texas
42	Jacob Broussard	Guard	5–10	160	Sophomore	Lafayette, Louisiana
44	Jerekius Davis	Forward	6–6	224	Freshman	Jackson, Mississippi
55	Scott Plaisance	Forward	6–9	280	Freshman	New Orleans, Louisiana

== Schedule ==
Date time, TV	Opponent	Result	Record	High points	High rebounds	High assists	Site (attendance) city, state
Exhibition
11/09/2015*; 7:15 pm	Mississippi College	W 104–72		19 – Hedgeman	6 – Wooten	4 – Wooten	Cajundome; Lafayette, LA
12/30/2015*; 7:00 pm	Spring Hill	W 74–54		22 – Register	7 – Wronkoski	4 – Shephard	Cajundome (3,218); Lafayette, LA
Regular season
11/13/2015*; 7:00 pm	Louisiana College	W 108–68	1–0	17 – Walker	11 – Walker	2 – Wright	Cajundome (2,784); Lafayette, LA
11/16/2015*; 6:00 pm, FSFL	at Miami (FL)	L 77–93	1–1	21 – Long	13 – Long	8 – Wright	BankUnited Center (5,965); Coral Gables, FL
11/20/2015*; 7:00 pm, SECN+	at Alabama	L 93–105	1–2	25 – Long	14 – Long	2 – Shephard	Coleman Coliseum (11,465); Tuscaloosa, AL
11/25/2015*; 7:00 pm	Loyola (New Orleans)	W 106–62	2–2	25 – Long	16 – Long	4 – Wooten	Cajundome (3,513); Lafayette, LA
12/03/2015; 7:00 pm	at Louisiana–Monroe	L 70–81	2–3 (0–1)	12 – Wooten	8 – Long	4 – Wright	Fant–Ewing Coliseum (3,310); Monroe, LA
12/09/2015*; 7:00 pm	McNeese State	W 97–64	3–3	24 – Long	11 – Long	5 – Shephard	Cajundome (3,571); Lafayette, LA
12/12/2015*; 12:00 pm, ASN	at Louisiana Tech	L 79–91	3–4	22 – Shephard	14 – Long	5 – Wright	Thomas Assembly Center (3,912); Ruston, LA
12/15/2015*; 8:00 pm, P12N	at No. 22 UCLA	L 80–89	3–5	26 – Long	16 – Long	5 – Wright	Pauley Pavilion (5,460); Los Angeles, CA
12/18/2015*; 9:00 pm	at Pepperdine	L 59–79	3–6	15 – Long	14 – Long	2 – Wright	Firestone Fieldhouse (1,022); Malibu, CA
12/21/2015*; 7:00 pm	New Orleans	W 79–69	4–6	16 – Stove	10 – Washington	3 – Washington	Cajundome (3,401); Lafayette, LA
01/02/2016; 7:15 pm	Appalachian State	W 79–58	5–6 (1–1)	19 – Shephard	15 – Long	4 – Wright	Cajundome (4,131); Lafayette, LA
01/07/2016; 7:15 pm	at Arkansas–Little Rock	L 57–77	5–7 (1–2)	16 – Long	11 – Long	3 – Wright	Jack Stephens Center (3,218); Little Rock, AR
01/09/2016; 7:00 pm	at Arkansas State	L 69–71	5–8 (1–3)	25 – Long	15 – Long	5 – Wright	Convocation Center (2,019); Jonesboro, AR
01/14/2016; 6:30 pm, ESPN3	at Georgia Southern	W 74–65	6–8 (2–3)	23 – Long	17 – Long	5 – Stove	Hanner Fieldhouse (2,023); Statesboro, GA
01/16/2016; 1:30 pm, ESPN3	at Georgia State	W 87–54	7–8 (3–3)	23 – Long	18 – Long	4 – Wright	GSU Sports Arena (1,440); Atlanta, GA
01/21/2016; 7:15 pm	South Alabama	W 92–82	8–8 (4–3)	27 – Shephard	6 – Stove	5 – Wright	Cajundome (4,050); Lafayette, LA
01/23/2016; 6:15 pm, ESPN3	Troy	W 88–65	9–8 (5–3)	20 – Long	14 – Long	7 – Wright	Cajundome (6,064); Lafayette, LA
01/28/2016; 7:15 pm	Texas State	W 80–54	10–8 (6–3)	19 – Long	14 – Long	7 – Wright	Cajundome (4,460); Lafayette, LA
01/30/2016; 6:15 pm	UT Arlington	W 90–75	11–8 (7–3)	22 – Long	15 – Long	6 – Stove	Cajundome (3,989); Lafayette, LA
02/02/2016; 7:15 pm	Louisiana–Monroe	W 72–65 ^{OT}	12–8 (8–3)	28 – Long	17 – Long	3 – Hedgeman	Cajundome (3,749); Lafayette, LA
02/04/2016; 6:30 pm, ESPN3	at Appalachian State	W 87–76	13–8 (9–3)	19 – Long	10 – Long	4 – Stove	Holmes Center (1,325); Boone, NC
02/11/2016; 7:15 pm	Arkansas State	W 83–73	14–8 (10–3)	17 – Long	15 – Long	3 – Long	Cajundome (4,420); Lafayette, LA
02/13/2016; 4:15 pm	Arkansas–Little Rock	L 64–68	14–9 (10–4)	18 – Stove	12 – Long	3 – Long	Cajundome (5,347); Lafayette, LA
02/18/2016; 7:15 pm, ESPN3	at UT Arlington	L 83–84 ^{OT}	14–10 (10–5)	28 – Long	18 – Long	3 – Wright	College Park Center (2,010); Arlington, TX
02/20/2015; 7:30 pm	at Texas State	L 57–61	14–11 (10–6)	14 – Stove	13 – Washington	3 – Wright	Strahan Coliseum (2,104); San Marcos, TX
02/25/2016; 7:30 pm	at Troy	W 73–63	15–11 (11–6)	29 – Long	20 – Long	4 – Williams	Trojan Arena (1,333); Troy, AL
02/27/2016; 4:00 pm	at South Alabama	L 70–83	15–12 (11–7)	25 – Long	13 – Long	3 – Williams	Mitchell Center (2,786); Mobile, AL
03/03/2016; 7:15 pm	Georgia State	L 69–72	15–13 (11–8)	21 – Washington	10 – Washington	4 – Wright	Cajundome (3,743); Lafayette, LA
03/05/2016; 7:15 pm	Georgia Southern	W 87–78	16–13 (12–8)	20 – Shephard	16 – Walker	3 – Long	Cajundome (4,474); Lafayette, LA
Sun Belt tournament
03/11/2016; 5:00 pm, ESPN3	vs. South Alabama; Quarterfinals	W 90–68	17–13	34 – Long	7 – Walker	6 – Wright	Lakefront Arena (907); New Orleans, LA
03/12/2016; 1:00 pm, ESPN3	vs. Arkansas–Little Rock; Semifinals	L 65–71	17–14	25 – Long	12 – Washington	4 – Wright	Lakefront Arena; New Orleans, LA
CIT
03/16/2016*; 7:00 pm	Texas A&M–Corpus Christi; First round	W 96–72	18–14	28 – Shephard	10 – Long	4 – Wright	Cajundome (1,205); Lafayette, LA
03/19/2016*; 1:00 pm	at Furman; Second round	W 80–72	19–14	18 – Shephard	12 – Walker	4 – Shephard	Timmons Arena (1,308); Greenville, SC
03/23/2016*; 7:15 pm	UC Irvine; Quarterfinals	L 66–67	19–15	13 – Walker	11 – Long	3 – Shephard	Cajundome (1,901); Lafayette, LA
*Non-conference game. ^{#}Rankings from AP Poll. (#) Tournament seedings in parentheses. All times are in Central Time.
