= 2015–16 Georgia State Panthers men's basketball team =

American college basketball season

2015–16 Georgia State Panthers men's basketball
- Conference: Sun Belt Conference
- Record: 16–14 (9–11 Sun Belt)
- Head coach: Ron Hunter (5th season)
- Assistant coaches: Darryl LaBarrie (5th season); Everick Sullivan (5th season); Claude Pardue (5th season)
- Home arena: GSU Sports Arena

2015–16 Sun Belt Conference men's basketball standings
	Conf.				Overall
Team	W		L	PCT	W		L	PCT
Little Rock †	17	–	3	.850	30	–	5	.857
Louisiana–Monroe	15	–	5	.750	20	–	14	.588
Texas–Arlington	13	–	7	.650	24	–	11	.686
Louisiana–Lafayette	12	–	8	.600	19	–	15	.559
Georgia Southern	10	–	10	.500	14	–	17	.452
Georgia State	9	–	11	.450	16	–	14	.533
Texas State	8	–	12	.400	15	–	16	.484
South Alabama	8	–	12	.400	14	–	19	.424
Arkansas State	7	–	13	.350	11	–	20	.355
Appalachian State	7	–	13	.350	9	–	22	.290
Troy	4	–	16	.200	9	–	22	.290
† 2016 Sun Belt Conference tournament winner

The 2015–16 Georgia State Panthers men's basketball team represented Georgia State University during the 2015–16 NCAA Division I men's basketball season. The team's head coach was Ron Hunter in his fifth season. The Panthers played their home games at the GSU Sports Arena and competed as a member of the Sun Belt Conference. They finished the season 16–14, 9–11 in Sun Belt play to finish in sixth place. They lost in the first round of the Sun Belt tournament to Texas State

== Last season ==
The Panthers finished the season 25–10, 15–5 in SBC play to finish in first place. They also won the SBC tournament and advanced to the round of 32 in the NCAA tournament after upsetting third seed, Baylor.

== Departures ==
Name	Number	Pos.	Height	Weight	Year	Hometown	Notes
RJ Hunter	22	G	6'6"	190	Junior	Conyers, GA	NBA draft
Ryan Harrow	55	PG	6'2"	160	Senior	Marietta, GA	Graduated
Curtis Washington	42	F	6'10"	230	Senior	Elizabethtown, KY	Graduated
Ryann Green	2	G	6'1"	180	Senior	College Park, GAI	Graduated

=== Incoming transfers ===
Name	Number	Pos.	Height	Weight	Year	Hometown	Previous School
Willie Clayton	21	F	6'8"	245	Senior	Thomasville, GA	Transferred from Charlotte. Under NCAA transfer rules, Clayton will have to sit out for the 2015–16 season. Will have one year of remaining eligibility.
Devin Mitchell	24	G	6'4"	175	Sophomore	Suwanee, GA	Transferred from Alabama. Under NCAA transfer rules, Mitchell will have to sit out for the 2015–16 season. Will have three years of remaining eligibility.

== Roster ==
2015–16 Georgia State Panthers men's basketball team
Players
Coaches

Pos.	#	Name	Height	Weight	Year	Hometown
F	1	Jeremy Hollowell	6 ft 8 in (2.03 m)	210 lb (95 kg)	RS Jr	Indianapolis, IN
G	2	Malik Benlevi	6 ft 4 in (1.93 m)	205 lb (93 kg)	Fr	Savannah, GA
G	4	Isaiah Dennis	6 ft 0 in (1.83 m)	190 lb (86 kg)	Jr	McDonough, GA
G	10	Austin Donaldson	6 ft 2 in (1.88 m)	185 lb (84 kg)	Fr	Jonesboro, GA
G	11	Isaiah Williams	6 ft 1 in (1.85 m)	175 lb (79 kg)	RS So	Buford, GA
G	12	Alario Harris (W)	5 ft 9 in (1.75 m)	150 lb (68 kg)	Fr	Lithonia, GA
F	15	Jalen Brown	6 ft 8 in (2.03 m)	235 lb (107 kg)	Sr	South Holland, IL
F	21	Willie Clayton (redshirt)	6 ft 8 in (2.03 m)	245 lb (111 kg)	Sr	Thomasville, GA
G	25	Devin Mitchell (redshirt)	6 ft 4 in (1.93 m)	175 lb (79 kg)	So	Suwanee, GA
G	30	Jeff Thomas	6 ft 5 in (1.96 m)	210 lb (95 kg)	RS Fr	Norwalk, OH
F	31	TJ Shipes	6 ft 7 in (2.01 m)	225 lb (102 kg)	Sr	Buford, GA
G	32	Kevin Ware	6 ft 2 in (1.88 m)	170 lb (77 kg)	RS Sr	Rockdale County, GA
F	33	Marcus Crider	6 ft 6 in (1.98 m)	205 lb (93 kg)	Sr	Dayton, OH
G	34	Carter Cagle	6 ft 3 in (1.91 m)	195 lb (88 kg)	So	Gainesville, GA

Head coach

- Ron Hunter (Miami (OH))

Assistant coach(es)

- Darryl LaBarrie (Georgia Tech)
- Everick Sullivan (Louisville)
- Claude Pardue (Emory)

Legend

- (C) Team captain
- (S) Suspended
- (I) Ineligible
- (W) Walk-on
- Injured
- Current redshirt

== Schedule ==
"Black Out" game against Georgia Southern in the GSU Sports Arena on Jan. 19, 2016

Date time, TV	Opponent	Result	Record	Site (attendance) city, state
Exhibition
November 9*; 7:00 pm	at Oglethorpe	W 85–34		GSU Sports Arena; Atlanta, GA
Regular season
November 13*; 7:00 pm, ESPN3	Middle Georgia State	W 73–54	1–0	GSU Sports Arena (2,334); Atlanta, GA
November 19*; 7:00 pm, ESPN3	Emmanuel	W 77–58	2–0	GSU Sports Arena (1,573); Atlanta, GA
November 25*; 5:00 pm, SECN	at Ole Miss	L 59–68	2–1	Tad Smith Coliseum (5,550); Oxford, MS
November 27*; 7:00 pm, ESPN3	IUPUI	W 78–72 ^{OT}	3–1	GSU Sports Arena (1,557); Atlanta, GA
December 1*; 9:00 pm, ASN	at UAB	L 57–64	3–2	Bartow Arena (3,709); Birmingham, AL
December 4*; 7:30 pm, ESPN3	at Wright State	W 59–46	4–2	Nutter Center (5,148); Fairborn, OH
December 12*; 2:00 pm, ESPN3	Old Dominion	W 68–64	5–2	GSU Sports Arena (1,741); Atlanta, GA
December 19*; 5:00 pm, ASN	at Southern Miss	W 66–46	6–2	Reed Green Coliseum (2,358); Hattiesburg, MS
December 22*; 7:00 pm, ESPN3	Middle Tennessee	W 64–62	7–2	GSU Sports Arena (1,819); Atlanta, GA
Conference Games
December 30; 8:15 pm	at UT Arlington	L 70–85	7–3 (0–1)	College Park Center (3,002); Arlington, TX
January 2; 5:30 pm	at Texas State	W 58–46	8–3 (1–1)	Strahan Coliseum (1,808); San Marcos, TX
January 7; 7:30 pm, ESPN3	Troy	W 72–68	9–3 (2–1)	GSU Sports Arena (1,393); Atlanta, GA
January 9; 2:30 pm, ESPN3	South Alabama	W 70–55	10–3 (3–1)	GSU Sports Arena (1,614); Atlanta, GA
January 14; 7:30 pm, ESPN3	Louisiana–Monroe	W 65–51	11–3 (4–1)	GSU Sports Arena (1,789); Atlanta, GA
January 16; 2:30 pm, ESPN3	Louisiana–Lafayette	L 54–87	11–4 (4–2)	GSU Sports Arena (1,440); Atlanta, GA
January 19; 7:30 pm, ESPN3	Georgia Southern; Modern Day Hate	W 69–66 ^{OT}	12–4 (5–2)	GSU Sports Arena (3,854); Atlanta, GA
January 21; 7:30, ESPN3	at Appalachian State	L 67–76	12–5 (5–3)	George M. Holmes Convocation Center (1,450); Boone, NC
January 28; 8:30 pm, ESPN3	at Arkansas State	L 69–75 ^{OT}	12–6 (5–4)	Convocation Center (1,719); Jonesboro, AR
January 30; 7:00 pm, ESPN3	at Little Rock	L 53–63	12–7 (5–5)	Jack Stephens Center (4,682); Little Rock, AR
February 4; 7:30 pm, ESPN3	Texas State	W 59–56	13–7 (6–5)	GSU Sports Arena (1,482); Atlanta, GA
February 6; 2:30 pm, ESPN3	UT Arlington	L 69–90	13–8 (6–6)	GSU Sports Arena (1,579); Atlanta, GA
February 11; 8:00 pm	at South Alabama	L 78–79	13–9 (6–7)	Mitchell Center (1,956); Mobile, AL
February 13; 5:15 pm	at Troy	L 53–54	13–10 (6–8)	Trojan Arena (1,436); Troy, AL
February 18; 7:30 pm, ESPN3	Little Rock	L 49–57	13–11 (6–9)	GSU Sports Arena (1,516); Atlanta, GA
February 20; 2:30 pm, ESPN3	Arkansas State	W 69–61	14–11 (7–9)	GSU Sports Arena (1,468); Atlanta, GA
February 23; 7:30 pm, ESPN2	at Georgia Southern; Modern Day Hate	L 52–54	14–12 (7–10)	Hanner Fieldhouse (4,046); Statesboro, GA
February 27; 2:30 pm, ESPN3	Appalachian State	W 83–70	15–12 (8–10)	GSU Sports Arena (1,784); Atlanta, GA
March 3; 8:15 pm	at Louisiana–Lafayette	W 72–69	16–12 (9–10)	Cajundome (3,743); Lafayette, LA
March 5; 5:00 pm, ESPN3	at Louisiana–Monroe	L 78–91	16–13 (9–11)	Fant–Ewing Coliseum (1,470); Monroe, LA
Sun Belt Tournament
March 10; 8:30 pm, ESPN3	at Texas State; First round	L 61–63	16–14	Lakefront Arena (703); New Orleans, LA
*Non-conference game. ^{#}Rankings from AP Poll. (#) Tournament seedings in parentheses. All times are in Eastern Time.
