= 2016 Sun Belt Conference men's basketball tournament =

- Classification: Division I
- Season: 2015–16
- Teams: 8
- Site: Lakefront Arena; New Orleans, Louisiana
- Champions: Little Rock (2nd title)
- Winning coach: Chris Beard (1st title)
- MVP: Roger Woods (Little Rock)
- Television: ESPN3, ESPN2

2015–16 Sun Belt Conference men's basketball standings
	Conf.				Overall
Team	W		L	PCT	W		L	PCT
Little Rock †	17	–	3	.850	30	–	5	.857
Louisiana–Monroe	15	–	5	.750	20	–	14	.588
Texas–Arlington	13	–	7	.650	24	–	11	.686
Louisiana–Lafayette	12	–	8	.600	19	–	15	.559
Georgia Southern	10	–	10	.500	14	–	17	.452
Georgia State	9	–	11	.450	16	–	14	.533
Texas State	8	–	12	.400	15	–	16	.484
South Alabama	8	–	12	.400	14	–	19	.424
Arkansas State	7	–	13	.350	11	–	20	.355
Appalachian State	7	–	13	.350	9	–	22	.290
Troy	4	–	16	.200	9	–	22	.290
† 2016 Sun Belt Conference tournament winner

The 2016 Sun Belt Conference men's basketball tournament was held at Lakefront Arena in New Orleans, Louisiana from March 10 to March 13. The tournament winner, Little Rock, received an automatic bid into the 2016 NCAA tournament.

== Seeds ==
Seed	School	Conference	Overall	Tiebreaker
1	Little Rock	17–3	27–4	
2	Louisiana–Monroe	15–5	19–12	
3	Texas–Arlington	13–7	22–9	
4	Louisiana–Lafayette	12–8	16–13	
5	Georgia Southern	10–10	14–16	
6	Georgia State	9–11	16–13	
7	Texas State	8–12	14–15	2–0 vs. South Alabama
8	South Alabama	8–12	13–18	0–2 vs. Texas State
‡ – Sun Belt Conference regular season champions. * – Received a first-round and second-round bye in the conference tournament. # – Received a first-round bye in the conference tournament. Overall record are as of the end of the regular season.

== Schedule ==
Session	Game	Time*	Matchup^{#}	Television
First round – Thursday, March 10
1	1	5:00 pm	#5 Georgia Southern 61 vs. #8 South Alabama 67	ESPN3
1	2	7:30 pm	#6 Georgia State 61 vs. #7 Texas State 63	ESPN3
Quarterfinals – Friday, March 11
2	3	5:00 pm	#4 Louisiana–Lafayette 90 vs. #8 South Alabama 68	ESPN3
2	4	7:30 pm	#3 Texas–Arlington 72 vs. #7 Texas State 63	ESPN3
Semifinals – Saturday, March 12
3	5	1:00 pm	#1 Little Rock 72 vs. #4 Louisiana–Lafayette 65	ESPN3
3	6	3:30 pm	#2 Louisiana–Monroe 82 vs. #3 Texas–Arlington 71	ESPN3
Championship – Sunday, March 13
4	7	12:00 pm	#1 Little Rock 70 vs. #2 Louisiana–Monroe 50	ESPN2
*Game times in CST/CDT. #-Rankings denote tournament seeding.

== Bracket ==
First round Thursday, March 10
5	Georgia Southern	61
8	South Alabama	67
6	Georgia State	61
7	Texas State	63

Quarterfinals; Friday, March 11
4	Louisiana–Lafayette	90
8	South Alabama	68
3	Texas–Arlington	72
7	Texas State	63

Semifinals; Saturday, March 12
1	Little Rock	72
4	Louisiana–Lafayette	65
2	Louisiana–Monroe	82
3	Texas–Arlington	71

Championship; Sunday, March 13
1	Little Rock	70
2	Louisiana–Monroe	50

== See also ==
2016 Sun Belt Conference women's basketball tournament
