= 2015–16 Troy Trojans men's basketball team =

American college basketball season

2015–16 Troy Trojans men's basketball
- Conference: Sun Belt Conference
- Record: 9–22 (4–16 Sun Belt)
- Head coach: Phil Cunningham (3rd season)
- Assistant coaches: Marcus Grant; Ben Fletcher; Chase Richardson
- Home arena: Trojan Arena (Capacity 5,200)

2015–16 Sun Belt Conference men's basketball standings
	Conf.				Overall
Team	W		L	PCT	W		L	PCT
Little Rock †	17	–	3	.850	30	–	5	.857
Louisiana–Monroe	15	–	5	.750	20	–	14	.588
Texas–Arlington	13	–	7	.650	24	–	11	.686
Louisiana–Lafayette	12	–	8	.600	19	–	15	.559
Georgia Southern	10	–	10	.500	14	–	17	.452
Georgia State	9	–	11	.450	16	–	14	.533
Texas State	8	–	12	.400	15	–	16	.484
South Alabama	8	–	12	.400	14	–	19	.424
Arkansas State	7	–	13	.350	11	–	20	.355
Appalachian State	7	–	13	.350	9	–	22	.290
Troy	4	–	16	.200	9	–	22	.290
† 2016 Sun Belt Conference tournament winner

The 2015–16 Troy Trojans men's basketball team represented Troy University during the 2015–16 NCAA Division I men's basketball season. The Trojans, led by third year head coach Phil Cunningham, played their home games at Trojan Arena and were members of the Sun Belt Conference. They finished the season 9–22, 4–16 in Sun Belt play to finish in last place. They failed to qualify for the Sun Belt tournament.

== Roster ==
Number	Name	Position	Height	Weight	Year	Hometown
1	Daniel Peace	Guard	6–1	182	Junior	Decatur, Georgia
2	Jeremy Hollimon	Guard	6–2	195	Junior	Gulfport, Mississippi
3	Wesley Person, Jr.	Guard	6–3	180	Sophomore	Brantley, Alabama
4	Kelton Ford	Guard	6–0	195	Junior	Horse Cave, Kentucky
5	Christian Harrison	Guard/Forward	6–6	200	Sophomore	Atlanta, Georgia
11	B.J. Miller	Guard	6–0	180	Freshman	Meridian, Mississippi
12	Jordan Howard	Guard	5–11	180	Junior	Monroeville, Alabama
14	Jaro Moravek	Forward/Center	6–8	240	Sophomore	Handlová, Slovakia
21	John Walton III	Forward	6–7	220	Senior	Memphis, Tennessee
23	Jordon Varnado	Forward	6–6	215	Freshman	Brownsville, Tennessee
24	Shawn Hopkins	Guard/Forward	6–5	185	Freshman	Nokia, Finland
30	Alex Hicks	Forward	6–8	205	Sophomore	Seale, Alabama
32	Damion Ottman	Forward	6–8	205	Freshman	Macon, Georgia
33	Aaron Ariri	Forward/Center	6–8	225	Sophomore	Brampton, Ontario

== Schedule ==
Date time, TV	Opponent	Result	Record	Site (attendance) city, state
Exhibition
11/05/2015*; 7:30 pm	Auburn–Montgomery	W 97–70		Trojan Arena (1,127); Troy, AL
Regular season
11/13/2015*; 7:30 pm, ESPN3	at South Florida	W 82–77	1–0	USF Sun Dome (4,859); Tampa, FL
11/15/2015*; 2:00 pm	Reinhardt; Mean Green Showcase	W 97–82	2–0	Trojan Arena (827); Troy, AL
11/19/2015*; 7:00 pm	UAB	L 63–79	2–1	Trojan Arena (2,887); Troy, AL
11/23/2015*; 5:00 pm	vs. Samford; Mean Green Showcase	L 79–83	2–2	The Super Pit (225); Denton, TX
11/24/2015*; 5:00 pm	vs. Idaho; Mean Green Showcase	L 63–69	2–3	The Super Pit (256); Denton, TX
11/25/2015*; 4:30 pm	at North Texas; Mean Green Showcase	W 86–74	3–3	The Super Pit (1,626); Denton, TX
12/01/2015*; 7:30 pm	Southern Miss	W 69–59	4–3	Trojan Arena (1,633); Troy, AL
12/05/2015*; 12:00 pm	Austin Peay	L 71–80	4–4	Trojan Arena (1,136); Troy, AL
12/10/2015*; 7:00 pm, FS1	at Seton Hall	L 69–78	4–5	Prudential Center (5,549); Newark, NJ
12/17/2015*; 7:00 pm	vs. Paine	W 85–77	5–5	Dothan Civic Center (1,135); Dothan, AL
12/22/2015*; 3:00 pm, SECN	at Ole Miss	L 80–83 ^{OT}	5–6	Tad Smith Coliseum (9,289); Oxford, MS
12/30/2015; 7:30 pm	Arkansas State	L 81–84	5–7 (0–1)	Trojan Arena (1,452); Troy, AL
01/02/2016; 4:15 pm	Arkansas–Little Rock	L 61–67	5–8 (0–2)	Trojan Arena (1,223); Troy, AL
01/07/2016; 6:30 pm, ESPN3	at Georgia State	L 68–72	5–9 (0–3)	GSU Sports Arena (1,393); Atlanta, GA
01/09/2016; 4:00 pm	at Georgia Southern	L 88–93 ^{OT}	5–10 (0–4)	Hanner Fieldhouse (1,155); Statesboro, GA
01/14/2016; 7:30 pm	UT Arlington	L 63–90	5–11 (0–5)	Trojan Arena (1,209); Troy, AL
01/16/2016; 4:15 pm	Texas State	W 66–57	6–11 (1–5)	Trojan Arena (1,492); Troy, AL
01/21/2016; 7:00 pm	at Louisiana–Monroe	L 74–85	6–12 (1–6)	Fant–Ewing Coliseum (3,284); Monroe, LA
01/23/2016; 6:15 pm, ESPN3	at Louisiana–Lafayette	L 65–88	6–13 (1–7)	Cajundome (6,064); Lafayette, LA
01/26/2016; 7:30 pm	South Alabama	L 58–66	6–14 (1–8)	Trojan Arena (2,224); Troy, AL
01/28/2016; 7:30 pm	Appalachian State	L 71–75	6–15 (1–9)	Trojan Arena (1,270); Troy, AL
02/04/2016; 7:15 pm	at Arkansas–Little Rock	L 49–72	6–16 (1–10)	Jack Stephens Center (3,385); Little Rock, AR
02/06/2016; 7:00 pm, ESPN3	at Arkansas State	W 71–70	7–16 (2–10)	Convocation Center (1,627); Jonesboro, AR
02/11/2016; 7:30 pm	Georgia Southern	L 71–77	7–17 (2–11)	Trojan Arena (1,326); Troy, AL
02/13/2016; 4:15 pm	Georgia State	W 54–53	8–17 (3–11)	Trojan Arena (1,436); Troy, AL
02/16/2016; 7:00 pm	at South Alabama	W 61–54	9–17 (4–11)	Mitchell Center (3,027); Mobile, AL
02/20/2016; 2:30 pm, ESPN3	at Appalachian State	L 74–78	9–18 (4–12)	Holmes Center (2,069); Boone, NC
02/25/2016; 7:30 pm	Louisiana–Lafayette	L 63–73	9–19 (4–13)	Trojan Arena (1,333); Troy, AL
02/27/2016; 4:15 pm	Louisiana–Monroe	L 51–66	9–20 (4–14)	Trojan Arena (1,414); Troy, AL
03/03/2016; 7:30 pm	at Texas State	L 57–78	9–21 (4–15)	Strahan Coliseum (1,718); San Marcos, TX
03/05/2016; 7:15 pm	at UT Arlington	L 55–90	9–22 (4–16)	College Park Center (2,722); Arlington, TX
*Non-conference game. ^{#}Rankings from AP Poll. (#) Tournament seedings in parentheses. All times are in Central Time.
