= 2015–16 Louisiana–Monroe Warhawks men's basketball team =

American college basketball season

2015–16 Louisiana–Monroe Warhawks men's basketball

CIT, First round
- Conference: Sun Belt Conference
- Record: 20–14 (15–5 Sun Belt)
- Head coach: Keith Richard (6th season)
- Assistant coaches: Ryan Cross; Lonnie Cooper; J.A. Anglin
- Home arena: Fant–Ewing Coliseum

2015–16 Sun Belt Conference men's basketball standings
| | Conf. | | | | Overall |
| Team | W | | L | PCT | W | | L | PCT |
|---|---|---|---|---|---|---|---|---|
| Little Rock † | 17 | – | 3 | .850 | 30 | – | 5 | .857 |
| Louisiana–Monroe | 15 | – | 5 | .750 | 20 | – | 14 | .588 |
| Texas–Arlington | 13 | – | 7 | .650 | 24 | – | 11 | .686 |
| Louisiana–Lafayette | 12 | – | 8 | .600 | 19 | – | 15 | .559 |
| Georgia Southern | 10 | – | 10 | .500 | 14 | – | 17 | .452 |
| Georgia State | 9 | – | 11 | .450 | 16 | – | 14 | .533 |
| Texas State | 8 | – | 12 | .400 | 15 | – | 16 | .484 |
| South Alabama | 8 | – | 12 | .400 | 14 | – | 19 | .424 |
| Arkansas State | 7 | – | 13 | .350 | 11 | – | 20 | .355 |
| Appalachian State | 7 | – | 13 | .350 | 9 | – | 22 | .290 |
| Troy | 4 | – | 16 | .200 | 9 | – | 22 | .290 |
† 2016 Sun Belt Conference tournament winner

The 2015–16 Louisiana–Monroe Warhawks men's basketball team represented the University of Louisiana at Monroe in the 2015–16 NCAA Division I men's basketball season. The Warhawks were led by sixth year head coach Keith Richard, played their home games at Fant–Ewing Coliseum and were members of the Sun Belt Conference. They finished the season 20–14, 15–5 in Sun Belt play to finish in second place. They defeated Texas–Arlington in the semifinals of the Sun Belt tournament to advance to the championship game where they lost to Little Rock. They were invited to the CollegeInsider.com Tournament where they lost in the first round to Furman.

== Roster ==
| Number | Name | Position | Height | Weight | Year | Hometown |
|---|---|---|---|---|---|---|
| 0 | Ramses Sandifer | Forward | 6–7 | 205 | Freshman | Arcola, Mississippi |
| 1 | Travis Munnings | Forward | 6–6 | 195 | Freshman | Freeport, Bahamas |
| 2 | DeMondre Harvey | Forward | 6–7 | 210 | Senior | Minden, Louisiana |
| 3 | Marcus Washington | Guard | 6–2 | 185 | Junior | Clinton, Mississippi |
| 4 | Mack Foster | Guard | 6–2 | 190 | Senior | Beulah, Mississippi |
| 5 | Jamaal Samuel | Forward | 6–9 | 195 | Senior | New Orleans, Louisiana |
| 11 | Nick Coppola | Guard | 5–11 | 195 | Junior | Richmond, Virginia |
| 13 | Majok Deng | Forward | 6–10 | 185 | Senior | Adelaide, Australia |
| 14 | Prince Cooper | Guard | 6–4 | 205 | Junior | Freeport, Bahamas |
| 22 | Lance Richard | Guard | 5–10 | 185 | Sophomore | Monroe, Louisiana |
| 24 | Roderick Taylor | Forward | 6–8 | 210 | Freshman | Harker Heights, Texas |
| 25 | Wade Martin | Guard | 6–5 | 185 | Freshman | Point Pleasant, West Virginia |
| 32 | Justin Roberson | Guard | 6–1 | 190 | Senior | Natchitoches, Louisiana |

== Schedule ==
| Date time, TV | Opponent | Result | Record | Site (attendance) city, state |
Exhibition
| 11/10/2015*; 7:00 pm | North American | W 107–51 | | Fant–Ewing Coliseum (1,174); Monroe, Louisiana |
Regular season
| 11/13/2015*; 1:00 pm | McMurry | W 88–43 | 1–0 | Fant–Ewing Coliseum (1,344); Monroe, Louisiana |
| 11/15/2015*; 2:00 pm, BTN | at Minnesota | L 56–67 | 1–1 | Williams Arena (9,915); Minneapolis, Minnesota |
| 11/19/2015*; 6:30 pm | at Northwestern State | L 56–67 | 2–1 | Prather Coliseum (1,917); Natchitoches, Louisiana |
| 11/28/2015*; 7:00 pm | at Houston | L 64–76 | 2–2 | Hofheinz Pavilion (2,332); Houston, Texas |
| 11/30/2015*; 7:00 pm | Chattanooga | W 64–54 | 3–2 | Fant–Ewing Coliseum (2,604); Monroe, Louisiana |
| 12/03/2015; 7:00 pm | Louisiana–Lafayette | W 81–70 | 4–2 (1–0) | Fant–Ewing Coliseum (3,310); Monroe, Louisiana |
| 12/10/2015*; 6:00 pm | at Kent State; Las Vegas Classic | L 62–73 | 4–3 | MAC Center (2,689); Kent, Ohio |
| 12/12/2015*; 1:00 pm, BTN | at Penn State; Las Vegas Classic | L 50–54 | 4–4 | Rec Hall (4,824); University Park, Pennsylvania |
| 12/13/2015*; 4:00 pm, RTPT | at No. 14 West Virginia | L 58–100 | 4–5 | WVU Coliseum (8,323); Morgantown, West Virginia |
| 12/18/2015*; 7:00 pm | Central Baptist | W 101–76 | 5–5 | Fant–Ewing Coliseum (1,065); Monroe, Louisiana |
| 12/22/2015*; 4:30 pm | vs. Canisius; Las Vegas Classic | L 96–108 ^{3OT} | 5–6 | Orleans Arena; Paradise, Nevada |
| 12/23/2015*; 12:30 pm | vs. Hampton; Las Vegas Classic | L 64–75 | 5–7 | Orleans Arena; Paradise, Nevada |
| 12/31/2015; 2:00 pm | Appalachian State | W 72–56 | 6–7 (2–0) | Fant–Ewing Coliseum (1,278); Monroe, Louisiana |
| 01/07/2016; 7:30 pm | at Arkansas State | L 65–68 ^{OT} | 6–8 (2–1) | Convocation Center (1,385); Jonesboro, Arkansas |
| 01/09/2016; 6:00 pm | at Arkansas–Little Rock | L 57–58 | 6–9 (2–2) | Jack Stephens Center (3,629); Little Rock, Arkansas |
| 01/14/2016; 6:30 pm, ESPN3 | at Georgia State | L 51–65 | 6–10 (2–3) | GSU Sports Arena (1,789); Atlanta, Georgia |
| 01/16/2016; 4:00 pm, ESPN3 | at Georgia Southern | L 51–66 | 6–11 (2–4) | Hanner Fieldhouse (1,206); Statesboro, Georgia |
| 01/21/2016; 7:00 pm | Troy | W 85–74 | 7–11 (3–4) | Fant–Ewing Coliseum (3,284); Monroe, Louisiana |
| 01/23/2016; 4:00 pm | South Alabama | W 100–68 | 8–11 (4–4) | Fant–Ewing Coliseum (1,556); Monroe, Louisiana |
| 01/28/2016; 7:00 pm | UT Arlington | W 99–88 | 9–11 (5–4) | Fant–Ewing Coliseum (3,857); Monroe, Louisiana |
| 01/30/2016; 2:00 pm | Texas State | W 72–59 | 10–11 (6–4) | Fant–Ewing Coliseum (1,319); Monroe, Louisiana |
| 02/02/2016; 7:15 pm | at Louisiana–Lafayette | L 65–72 ^{OT} | 10–12 (6–5) | Cajundome (3,749); Lafayette, Louisiana |
| 02/06/2016; 2:30 pm, ESPN3 | at Appalachian State | W 91–90 | 11–12 (7–5) | Holmes Center (1,509); Boone, North Carolina |
| 02/11/2016; 7:00 pm | Arkansas–Little Rock | W 86–82 | 12–12 (8–5) | Fant–Ewing Coliseum (3,761); Monroe, Louisiana |
| 02/13/2016; 4:00 pm | Arkansas State | W 78–73 ^{OT} | 13–12 (9–5) | Fant–Ewing Coliseum (3,792); Monroe, Louisiana |
| 02/18/2015; 7:30 pm | at Texas State | W 76–57 | 14–12 (10–5) | Strahan Coliseum (2,452); San Marcos, Texas |
| 02/20/2016; 7:15 pm, ESPN3 | at UT Arlington | W 64–61 | 15–12 (11–5) | College Park Center (3,314); Arlington, Texas |
| 02/25/2016; 7:00 pm, ESPN3 | at South Alabama | W 66–59 | 16–12 (12–5) | Mitchell Center (1,877); Mobile, Alabama |
| 02/27/2016; 4:15 pm | at Troy | W 66–51 | 17–12 (13–5) | Trojan Arena (1,414); Troy, Alabama |
| 03/03/2016; 7:00 pm | Georgia Southern | W 83–76 | 18–12 (14–5) | Fant–Ewing Coliseum (3,483); Monroe, Louisiana |
| 03/05/2016; 4:00 pm, ESPN3 | Georgia State | W 91–78 | 19–12 (15–5) | Fant–Ewing Coliseum (1,470); Monroe, Louisiana |
Sun Belt tournament
| 03/12/2016; 3:30 pm, ESPN3 | vs. Texas–Arlington; Semifinals | W 82–71 | 20–12 | Lakefront Arena; New Orleans, Louisiana |
| 03/12/2016; 12:00 pm, ESPN2 | vs. Arkansas–Little Rock; Championship game | L 50–70 | 20–13 | Lakefront Arena (1,665); New Orleans, Louisiana |
CIT
| 03/15/2016*; 6:00 pm | at Furman; First round | L 57–58 | 20–14 | Timmons Arena (806); Greenville, South Carolina |
*Non-conference game. ^{#}Rankings from AP Poll. (#) Tournament seedings in parentheses. All times are in Central Time.
