= 2015–16 Texas State Bobcats men's basketball team =

American college basketball season

2015–16 Texas State Bobcats men's basketball
- Conference: Sun Belt Conference
- Record: 15–16 (8–12 Sun Belt)
- Head coach: Danny Kaspar (3rd season)
- Assistant coaches: Rob Flaska (7th season); Jim Shaw (3rd season); Terrence Johnson (1st season)
- Home arena: Strahan Coliseum

2015–16 Sun Belt Conference men's basketball standings
	Conf.				Overall
Team	W		L	PCT	W		L	PCT
Little Rock †	17	–	3	.850	30	–	5	.857
Louisiana–Monroe	15	–	5	.750	20	–	14	.588
Texas–Arlington	13	–	7	.650	24	–	11	.686
Louisiana–Lafayette	12	–	8	.600	19	–	15	.559
Georgia Southern	10	–	10	.500	14	–	17	.452
Georgia State	9	–	11	.450	16	–	14	.533
Texas State	8	–	12	.400	15	–	16	.484
South Alabama	8	–	12	.400	14	–	19	.424
Arkansas State	7	–	13	.350	11	–	20	.355
Appalachian State	7	–	13	.350	9	–	22	.290
Troy	4	–	16	.200	9	–	22	.290
† 2016 Sun Belt Conference tournament winner

The 2015–16 Texas State Bobcats men's basketball team represented Texas State University in the 2015–16 NCAA Division I men's basketball season. The Bobcats, led by third-year head coach Danny Kaspar, played their home games at Strahan Coliseum and were members of the Sun Belt Conference. They finished the season 15–16, 8–12 in Sun Belt play to finish in a tie for seventh place. As the No. 7 seed in the Sun Belt tournament, they defeated Georgia State in the first round before losing to Texas–Arlington in the quarterfinals.

== Offseason ==
=== Departures ===
Departures
Name	Number	Pos.	Height	Weight	Year	Hometown	Reason for departure
D.J. Brown	0	G	6'2"	185	Senior	Los Angeles, CA	Graduated
Jonathan Wiley	2	G	6'5"	190	Freshman	Houston, TX	Transferred to Panola College
Wesley Davis	10	G	6'3"	185	Senior	Arlington, TX	Graduated
Victor Bermudez	22	G	6'4"	170	Senior	North Las Vegas, NV	Graduated
JaMarcus Weatherspoon	23	G	6'4"	185	Junior	Baton Rouge, LA	Transferred to Southern
Ed Seay	33	F	6'8"	220	Sophomore	Merrillville, IN	Transferred to St. Mary's (TX)
Brian Herring	34	G	6'3"	180	Freshman	San Antonio, TX	No longer on team roster

=== Incoming transfers ===
Incoming transfers
Name	Number	Pos.	Height	Weight	Year	Hometown	Previous School
Bobby Conley	0	G	6'1"	195	Junior	Massillon, OH	Palm Beach State
Maljhum McCrea	3	F	6'7"	215	Junior	Miami, FL	St. Petersburg
Anthony Roberson	23	G	6'5"	180	Sophomore	Converse, TX	Weatherford

== Roster ==
Number	Name	Position	Height	Weight	Year	Hometown
0	Bobby Conley	Guard	6–1	195	Junior	Massillon, Ohio
1	Kavin Gilder-Tilbury	Forward	6–7	210	Junior	Houston, Texas
2	Nathan Josephs	Guard	5–10	180	Freshman	San Antonio, Texas
3	Maljhum McCrea	Forward	6–7	215	Junior	San Antonio, Texas
4	Courtney Julien	Guard	6–4	180	Freshman	San Antonio, Texas
5	Ojai Black	Guard	6–1	195	Junior	Killeen, Texas
10	D'Angelo West	Guard	6–2	180	Freshman	Arlington, Texas
14	K.J. Malveau	Guard	5–10	180	Freshman	Fort Worth, Texas
15	Ethan Montalvo	Guard	6–0	175	Senior	Omaha, Nebraska
21	Emani Gant	Forward	6–8	225	Senior	Los Angeles, California
23	Anthony Roberson	Guard	6–5	180	Sophomore	Converse, Texas
24	Cameron Naylon	Forward	6–7	195	Senior	Jacksonville, Florida
31	Austin Evans	Forward	6–11	225	Sophomore	Plano, Texas
32	Kendell Ramlal	Forward	6–7	217	Junior	Houston, Texas

== Schedule ==
Date time, TV	Opponent	Result	Record	Site (attendance) city, state
Exhibition
11/24/2015*; 7:00 pm	Oklahoma Panhandle State	W 93–62		Strahan Coliseum (1,248); San Marcos, TX
Non-conference regular season
11/16/2015*; 7:00 pm	UT Tyler	W 84–49	1–0	Strahan Coliseum (2,196); San Marcos, TX
11/21/2015*; 8:30 pm	at UTEP	L 62–77	1–1	Don Haskins Center (7,311); El Paso, TX
11/28/2015*; 3:00 pm, RTSW	at McNeese State	W 70–67	2–1	Burton Coliseum; Lake Charles, LA
12/2/2015*; 7:00 pm	UTSA	W 76–53	3–1	Strahan Coliseum (3,220); San Marcos, TX
12/5/2015*; 7:00 pm, TWCS	at Texas A&M–Corpus Christi	L 39–47	3–2	American Bank Center (1,586); Corpus Christi, TX
12/13/2015*; 2:00 pm	Texas–Rio Grande Valley	W 68–59	4–2	Strahan Coliseum (1,389); San Marcos, TX
12/16/2015*; 7:00 pm	at Prairie View A&M	W 62–44	5–2	William J. Nicks Building (268); Prairie View, TX
12/18/2015*; 8:00 pm, P12N	at Washington State	L 73–78 ^{OT}	5–3	Beasley Coliseum (1,233); Pullman, WA
12/21/2015*; 7:00 pm	Howard Payne	W 92–43	6–3	Strahan Coliseum (1,346); San Marcos, TX
Sun Belt regular season
12/30/2016; 7:30 pm	Georgia Southern	W 80–66	7–3 (1–0)	Strahan Coliseum (1,822); San Marcos, TX
01/02/2016; 4:30 pm	Georgia State	L 46–58	7–4 (1–1)	Strahan Coliseum (1,808); San Marcos, TX
01/09/2016; 2:30 pm, ESPN3	at Appalachian State	L 56–76	7–5 (1–2)	Holmes Center (1,246); Boone, NC
01/14/2016; 7:00 pm	at South Alabama	W 78–67	8–5 (2–2)	Mitchell Center (2,084); Mobile, AL
01/16/2016; 4:15 pm	at Troy	L 57–66	8–6 (2–3)	Trojan Arena (1,492); Troy, AL
01/21/2016; 7:30 pm	Arkansas–Little Rock	L 74–77 ^{OT}	8–7 (2–4)	Strahan Coliseum (3,357); San Marcos, TX
01/23/2016; 4:30 pm	Arkansas State	W 78–68	9–7 (3–4)	Strahan Coliseum (2,857); San Marcos, TX
01/28/2016; 7:15 pm	at Louisiana–Lafayette	L 54–80	9–8 (3–5)	Cajundome (4,460); Lafayette, LA
01/30/2016; 2:00 pm	at Louisiana–Monroe	L 59–72	9–9 (3–6)	Fant–Ewing Coliseum (1,319); Monroe, LA
02/04/2016; 6:30 pm, ESPN3	at Georgia State	L 56–59	9–10 (3–7)	GSU Sports Arena (1,482); Atlanta, GA
02/06/2016; 6:00 pm	at Georgia Southern	L 62–66	9–11 (3–8)	Hanner Fieldhouse (2,213); Statesboro, GA
02/09/2016; 8:00 pm, ESPN2	Texas–Arlington	L 53–65	9–12 (3–9)	Strahan Coliseum (3,408); San Marcos, TX
02/11/2016; 7:30 pm	Appalachian State	W 69–68	10–12 (4–9)	Strahan Coliseum (2,375); San Marcos, TX
02/18/2016; 7:30 pm	Louisiana–Monroe	L 57–76	10–13 (4–10)	Strahan Coliseum (2,452); San Marcos, TX
02/20/2016; 4:30 pm	Louisiana–Lafayette	W 61–57	11–13 (5–10)	Strahan Coliseum (2,104); San Marcos, TX
02/25/2016; 7:30 pm	at Arkansas State	W 71–60	12–13 (6–10)	Convocation Center (1,470); Jonesboro, AR
02/27/2016; 6:00 pm	at Arkansas–Little Rock	L 68–73	12–14 (6–11)	Jack Stephens Center (5,168); Little Rock, AR
03/01/2016; 7:15 pm	at Texas–Arlington	L 69–75	12–15 (6–12)	College Park Center (2,196); Arlington, TX
03/03/2016; 7:30 pm	Troy	W 78–57	13–15 (7–12)	Strahan Coliseum (1,718); San Marcos, TX
03/05/2016; 4:30 pm	South Alabama	W 68–57	14–15 (8–12)	Strahan Coliseum (2,001); San Marcos, TX
Sun Belt tournament
03/10/2016; 7:30 pm, ESPN3	vs. Georgia State; First round	W 63–61	15–15	Lakefront Arena (703); New Orleans, LA
03/11/2016; 7:30 pm, ESPN3	vs. Texas–Arlington; Quarterfinals	L 63–72	15–16	Lakefront Arena (907); New Orleans, LA
*Non-conference game. ^{#}Rankings from AP Poll. (#) Tournament seedings in parentheses. All times are in Central Time.
