= 2015–16 Rice Owls men's basketball team =

American college basketball season

2015–16 Rice Owls men's basketball
- Conference: Conference USA
- Record: 12–20 (7–11 C-USA)
- Head coach: Mike Rhoades (2nd season)
- Assistant coaches: Carlin Hartman; Scott Pera; J.D. Byers
- Home arena: Tudor Fieldhouse

2015–16 Conference USA men's basketball standings
| | Conf. | | | | Overall |
| Team | W | | L | PCT | W | | L | PCT |
|---|---|---|---|---|---|---|---|---|
| UAB | 16 | – | 2 | .889 | 26 | – | 7 | .788 |
| Middle Tennessee † | 13 | – | 5 | .722 | 25 | – | 10 | .714 |
| Marshall | 12 | – | 6 | .667 | 17 | – | 16 | .515 |
| Louisiana Tech | 12 | – | 6 | .667 | 23 | – | 10 | .697 |
| Old Dominion | 12 | – | 6 | .667 | 25 | – | 13 | .658 |
| UTEP | 10 | – | 8 | .556 | 19 | – | 14 | .576 |
| Charlotte | 9 | – | 9 | .500 | 14 | – | 19 | .424 |
| Western Kentucky | 8 | – | 10 | .444 | 18 | – | 16 | .529 |
| North Texas | 7 | – | 11 | .389 | 12 | – | 20 | .375 |
| Rice | 7 | – | 11 | .389 | 12 | – | 20 | .375 |
| FIU | 7 | – | 11 | .389 | 13 | – | 19 | .406 |
| Florida Atlantic | 5 | – | 13 | .278 | 8 | – | 25 | .242 |
| Southern Miss* | 5 | – | 13 | .278 | 8 | – | 21 | .276 |
| UTSA | 3 | – | 15 | .167 | 5 | – | 27 | .156 |
† 2016 C-USA Tournament winner *Ineligible for postseason play due to self-imposed postseason ban.

The 2015–16 Rice Owls men's basketball team represented Rice University during the 2015–16 NCAA Division I men's basketball season. The Owls, led by second year head coach Mike Rhoades, played their home games at Tudor Fieldhouse and were members of Conference USA. They finished the season 12–20, 7–11 in C-USA play to finish in a three-way tie for ninth place. They lost in the second round of the C-USA tournament to Charlotte.

== Previous season ==
The Owls finished the season 12–20, 8–10 in C-USA play to finish in a four-way tie for seventh place. They advanced to the quarterfinals of the C-USA tournament where they lost to Louisiana Tech.

== Departures ==
| Name | Number | Pos. | Height | Weight | Year | Hometown | Notes |
|---|---|---|---|---|---|---|---|
| Dan Peera | 0 | G | 6'0" | 180 | Senior | San Ramon, California | Graduated |
| Jordan Reed | 5 | G | 5'11" | 170 | Freshman | Lucas, Texas | Transferred to New Hampshire |
| Denzel Davis | 10 | F | 6'8" | 215 | RS Freshman | Orlando, Florida | Left Rice (Personal) |
| Jeremy Jones | 20 | F | 6'5" | 205 | Freshman | San Antonio, Texas | Transferred to Gonzaga |
| J.T. Trauber | 24 | G | 5'10" | 165 | Freshman | Houston, Texas | Left Team (Personal) |
| Van Green | 31 | G | 6'3" | 185 | Senior | Birmingham, Alabama | Exhausted Eligibility |
| Seth Gearhart | 41 | F | 6'7" | 215 | Senior | Wilsonville, Oregon | Graduated |

== Recruiting class of 2015 ==
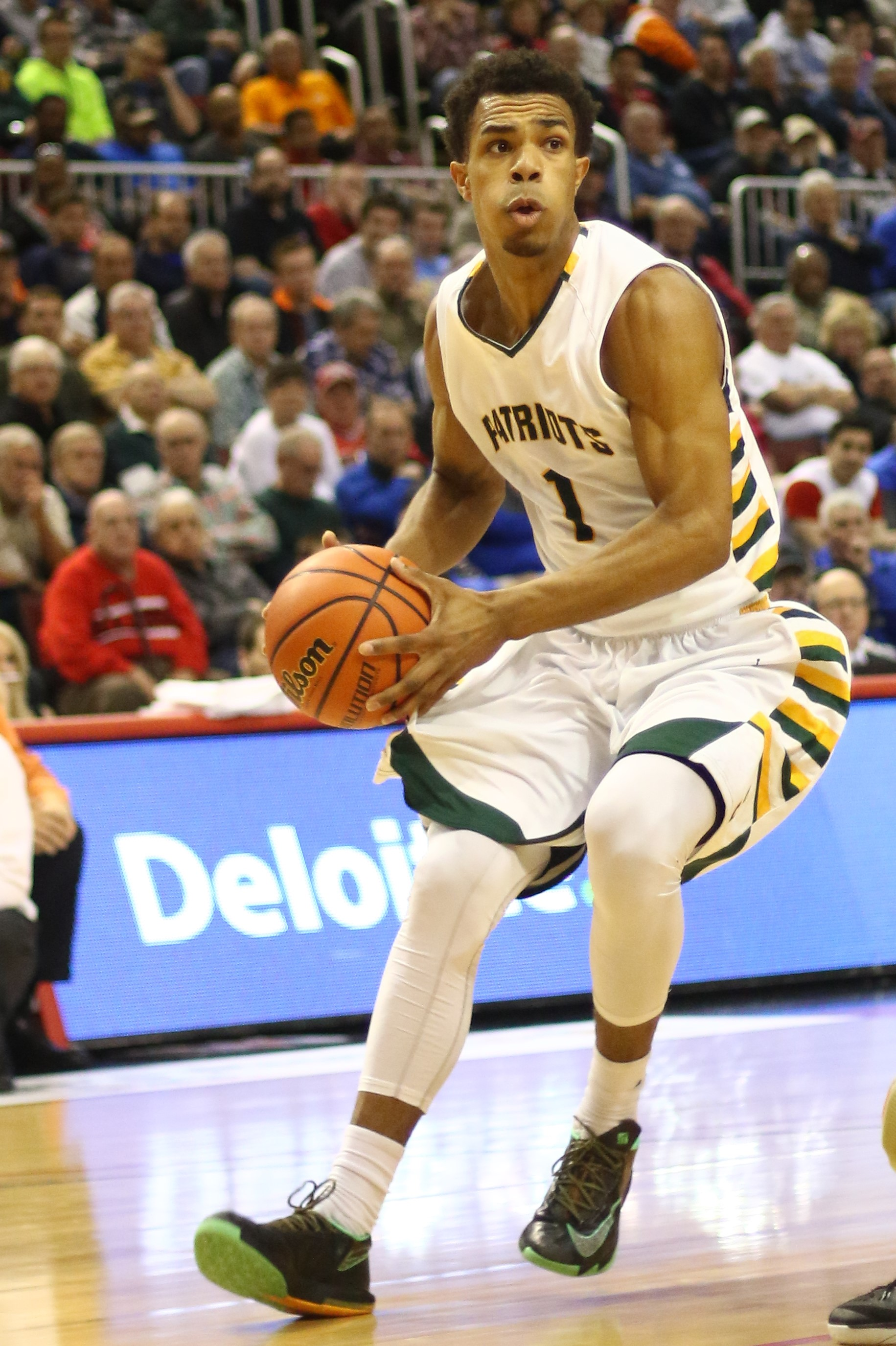
Connor Cashaw in the 2015 IHSA 4A championship game victory

College recruiting information
| Name | Hometown | School | Height | Weight | Commit date |
|---|---|---|---|---|---|
| Marcus Evans; PG | Virginia Beach, VA | Cape Henry Collegiate School | 6 ft 2 in (1.88 m) | 185 lb (84 kg) | Jun 29, 2014 |
| Marcus Evans; PG | Recruit ratings: Scout: Rivals: 247Sports: (NR) | | | | |
| Connor Cashaw; SG | Lincolnshire, IL | Adlai E. Stevenson High School | 6 ft 4 in (1.93 m) | 185 lb (84 kg) | Sep 30, 2014 |
| Connor Cashaw; SG | Recruit ratings: Scout: Rivals: (NR) | | | | |
| Marquez Letcher-Ellis; SF | Houston, TX | Montverde Academy | 6 ft 6 in (1.98 m) | 170 lb (77 kg) | Oct 25, 2014 |
| Marquez Letcher-Ellis; SF | Recruit ratings: Scout: Rivals: 247Sports: (79) | | | | |
| Amir Smith; SF | Missouri City, TX | Ridgepoint High School | 6 ft 6 in (1.98 m) | 200 lb (91 kg) | Apr 30, 2015 |
| Amir Smith; SF | Recruit ratings: Scout: Rivals: 247Sports: (NR) | | | | |
| Chad Lott; PG | Shreveport, LA | Byrd High School | 6 ft 3 in (1.91 m) | 185 lb (84 kg) | May 19, 2014 |
| Chad Lott; PG | Recruit ratings: Scout: Rivals: 247Sports: (78) | | | | |
Overall recruit ranking:
Note: In many cases, Scout, Rivals, 247Sports, On3, and ESPN may conflict in their listings of height and weight.; In these cases, the average was taken. ESPN grades are on a 100-point scale.; Sources: "2015 Team Ranking". Rivals.

== Roster ==
2015–16 Rice Owls men's basketball team
Players
Coaches

| Pos. | # | Name | Height | Weight | Year | Hometown |
|---|---|---|---|---|---|---|
| G | 0 | Connor Cashaw | 6 ft 5 in (1.96 m) | 195 lb (88 kg) | Fr | Lincolnshire, IL |
| G | 1 | Max Guercy (C) | 5 ft 9 in (1.75 m) | 170 lb (77 kg) | Sr | Arleta, California |
| G | 2 | Marcus Evans | 6 ft 2 in (1.88 m) | 190 lb (86 kg) | Fr | Chesapeake, Virginia |
| G/F | 4 | Egor Koulechov | 6 ft 5 in (1.96 m) | 210 lb (95 kg) | RS So | Volgograd, Russia |
| F | 12 | Marquez Letcher-Ellis | 6 ft 7 in (2.01 m) | 205 lb (93 kg) | Fr | Houston, Texas |
| G | 15 | Bishop Mency | 6 ft 5 in (1.96 m) | 185 lb (84 kg) | So | Chino Hills, California |
| G | 21 | Chad Lott (injured) | 6 ft 3 in (1.91 m) | 185 lb (84 kg) | Fr | Shreveport, Louisiana |
| G | 22 | Marcus Jackson | 6 ft 3 in (1.91 m) | 175 lb (79 kg) | Jr | Acton, California |
| G | 30 | Oliver Xu (W) | 6 ft 2 in (1.88 m) | 170 lb (77 kg) | So | Hong Kong |
| G/F | 31 | Harrison Brown (W) | 6 ft 4 in (1.93 m) | 190 lb (86 kg) | Fr | Charlottesville, Virginia |
| F | 32 | Amir Smith | 6 ft 6 in (1.98 m) | 200 lb (91 kg) | Fr | Missouri City, Texas |
| C | 45 | Nate Pollard | 7 ft 1 in (2.16 m) | 220 lb (100 kg) | So | Bountiful, Utah |
| C | 54 | Andrew Drone | 6 ft 10 in (2.08 m) | 260 lb (118 kg) | Jr | Junction, Illinois |

Head coach

- Mike Rhoades

Assistant coach(es)

- Carlin Hartman
- Scott Pera
- J.D. Byers

Legend

- (C) Team captain
- (S) Suspended
- (I) Ineligible
- (W) Walk-on
- Injured
- Current redshirt

Roster
Last update: 2015-07-29

== Schedule ==
| Date time, TV | Rank^{#} | Opponent^{#} | Result | Record | Site (attendance) city, state |
Exhibition
| 11/07/2015*; 7:00 pm | | LeTourneau | W 102–78 | | Tudor Fieldhouse; Houston, TX |
Non-conference regular season
| 11/13/2015*; 10:30 pm, P12N | | at No. 14 California | L 65–97 | 0–1 | Haas Pavilion (10,530); Berkeley, CA |
| 11/16/2015*; 9:00 pm | | at San Francisco; Roundball Showcase | L 54–80 | 0–2 | War Memorial Gymnasium (1,417); San Francisco, CA |
| 11/19/2015*; 8:00 pm, ASN | | Oregon State | L 69–77 | 0–3 | Tudor Fieldhouse (1,981); Houston, TX |
| 11/22/2015*; 5:00 pm | | Fresno State; Roundball Showcase | L 65–82 | 0–4 | Tudor Fieldhouse (1,749); Houston, TX |
| 11/25/2015*; 8:00 pm, ASN | | Lamar; Roundball Showcase | W 94–82 | 1–4 | Tudor Fieldhouse (1,376); Houston, TX |
| 11/27/2015*; 7:00 pm | | UC Riverside; Roundball Showcase | W 87–81 | 2–4 | Tudor Fieldhouse (1,169); Houston, TX |
| 11/29/2015*; 5:00 pm | | Texas–Arlington | L 74–92 | 2–5 | Tudor Fieldhouse (1,668); Houston, TX |
| 12/02/2015*; 7:30 pm | | at Houston Baptist | L 73–77 | 2–6 | Sharp Gymnasium (887); Houston, TX |
| 12/05/2015*; 7:00 pm | | St. Edward's | W 93–72 | 3–6 | Tudor Fieldhouse; Houston, TX |
| 12/17/2015*; 11:30 am | | St. Thomas | W 67–54 | 4–6 | Tudor Fieldhouse (5,268); Houston, TX |
| 12/19/2015*; 7:00 pm, ROOT | | at New Mexico | W 90–89 | 5–6 | The Pit (12,507); Albuquerque, NM |
| 12/22/2015*; 7:05 pm | | at South Alabama | L 67–74 | 5–7 | Mitchell Center (1,937); Mobile, AL |
| 12/29/2015*; 7:00 pm | | Incarnate Word | L 76–82 | 5–8 | Tudor Fieldhouse (1,747); Houston, TX |
C-USA Regular season
| 01/01/2016; 8:00 pm, ASN | | at UTEP | L 60–61 | 5–9 (0–1) | Don Haskins Center (7,154); El Paso, TX |
| 01/03/2016; 3:00 pm | | at UTSA | L 80–85 | 5–10 (0–2) | Convocation Center (607); San Antonio, TX |
| 01/09/2016; 1:00 pm, ASN | | at North Texas | L 74–85 | 5–11 (0–3) | The Super Pit (1,886); Denton, TX |
| 01/14/2016; 7:00 pm, ASN | | WKU | W 83–73 | 6–11 (1–3) | Tudor Fieldhouse (1,664); Houston, TX |
| 01/16/2016; 7:00 pm | | Marshall | L 90–94 | 6–12 (1–4) | Tudor Fieldhouse (2,196); Houston, TX |
| 01/21/2016; 8:00 pm, CBSSN | | at UAB | L 70–82 | 6–13 (1–5) | Bartow Arena (5,535); Birmingham, AL |
| 01/23/2016; 5:00 pm | | at Middle Tennessee | L 73–87 | 6–14 (1–6) | Murphy Center (4,104); Murfreesboro, TN |
| 01/30/2016; 7:00 pm | | North Texas | W 95–87 | 7–14 (2–6) | Tudor Fieldhouse (2,515); Houston, TX |
| 02/04/2016; 7:00 pm | | Louisiana Tech | L 78–90 | 7–15 (2–7) | Tudor Fieldhouse (1,660); Houston, TX |
| 02/06/2016; 7:00 pm | | Southern Miss | W 72–65 | 8–15 (3–7) | Tudor Fieldhouse (2,760); Houston, TX |
| 02/11/2016; 6:00 pm | | at Charlotte | L 73-102 | 8–16 (3–8) | Dale F. Halton Arena (3,127); Charlotte, NC |
| 02/13/2016; 1:00 pm, ASN | | at Old Dominion | W 75–66 | 9–16 (4–8) | Ted Constant Convocation Center (7,075); Norfolk, VA |
| 02/18/2016; 7:00 pm | | Florida Atlantic | W 90–85 | 10–16 (5–8) | Tudor Fieldhouse (1,400); Houston, TX |
| 02/20/2016; 1:00 pm, ASN | | FIU | W 86–70 | 11–16 (6–8) | Tudor Fieldhouse (3,859); Houston, TX |
| 02/25/2016; 7:00 pm | | at Southern Miss | W 76–74 ^{OT} | 12–16 (7–8) | Reed Green Coliseum (2,547); Hattiesburg, MS |
| 02/27/2016; 6:00 pm | | at Louisiana Tech | L 69–88 | 12–17 (7–9) | Thomas Assembly Center (5,527); Ruston, LA |
| 03/03/2016; 7:00 pm | | Charlotte | L 75–88 | 12–18 (7–10) | Tudor Fieldhouse (1,349); Houston, TX |
| 03/05/2016; 1:00 pm, ASN | | Old Dominion | L 67–74 | 12–19 (7–11) | Tudor Fieldhouse (3,418); Houston, TX |
Conference USA tournament
| 03/09/2016; 6:00 pm, ASN | | vs. Charlotte; Second round | L 69–79 | 12–20 | Legacy Arena (3,905); Birmingham, AL |
*Non-conference game. ^{#}Rankings from AP Poll. (#) Tournament seedings in parentheses. All times are in Central Time.

== See also ==
2015–16 Rice Owls women's basketball team
