= 2015–16 Little Rock Trojans men's basketball team =

American college basketball season

2015–16 Little Rock Trojans men's basketball
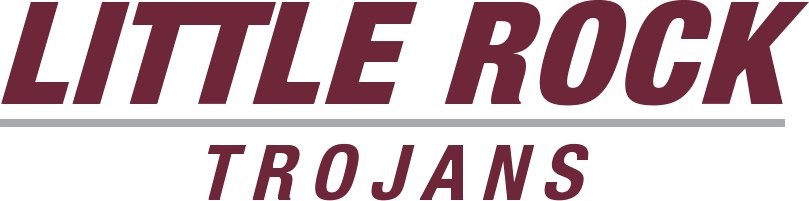

Sun Belt regular season champions Sun Belt tournament champions

NCAA tournament, Second Round
- Conference: Sun Belt Conference
- Record: 30–5 (17–3 Sun Belt)
- Head coach: Chris Beard (1st season)
- Assistant coaches: Wes Flanigan; Brian Burg; Mark Adams
- Home arena: Jack Stephens Center

2015–16 Sun Belt Conference men's basketball standings
	Conf.				Overall
Team	W		L	PCT	W		L	PCT
Little Rock †	17	–	3	.850	30	–	5	.857
Louisiana–Monroe	15	–	5	.750	20	–	14	.588
Texas–Arlington	13	–	7	.650	24	–	11	.686
Louisiana–Lafayette	12	–	8	.600	19	–	15	.559
Georgia Southern	10	–	10	.500	14	–	17	.452
Georgia State	9	–	11	.450	16	–	14	.533
Texas State	8	–	12	.400	15	–	16	.484
South Alabama	8	–	12	.400	14	–	19	.424
Arkansas State	7	–	13	.350	11	–	20	.355
Appalachian State	7	–	13	.350	9	–	22	.290
Troy	4	–	16	.200	9	–	22	.290
† 2016 Sun Belt Conference tournament winner

The 2015–16 Little Rock Trojans men's basketball team represented the University of Arkansas at Little Rock during the 2015–16 NCAA Division I men's basketball season. The Trojans, led by first-year head coach Chris Beard in his only season, played their home games at the Jack Stephens Center in Little Rock, Arkansas and were members of the Sun Belt Conference. They finished the season 30–5, 17–3 in Sun Belt play to win the Sun Belt regular season championship. They defeated Louisiana–Lafayette and Louisiana–Monroe to win the Sun Belt tournament and earn the conference's automatic bid to the NCAA tournament. In the Tournament as a No. 12 seed, they defeated Purdue in the first round before losing in the second round to Iowa State.

This was the first season in which the school used "Little Rock" as its athletic brand; previously, it had alternately used "Arkansas–Little Rock" and "UALR".

Following the season, first-year head coach Chris Beard left the school to accept the head coaching position at Texas Tech. On March 31, 2016, the school hired Wes Flanigan as head coach.

== Previous season ==
The Trojans finished the 2014–15 season 13–18, 8–12 in Sun Belt play to finish in eighth place. They lost in the first round of the Sun Belt tournament to South Alabama.

On March 18, 2015, head coach Steve Shields was fired. He compiled a record of 192–178 in eight seasons. In early April, the school hired Chris Beard as head coach.

== Roster ==
2015–16 Little Rock Trojans men's basketball team
Players
Coaches

Pos.	#	Name	Height	Weight	Year	Hometown
F	0	Roger Woods	6 ft 5 in (1.96 m)	230 lb (104 kg)	Sr	Jackson, MS
G	1	Jalen Jackson	6 ft 6 in (1.98 m)	195 lb (88 kg)	Jr	West Memphis, AR
F	2	Daniel Green	6 ft 10 in (2.08 m)	240 lb (109 kg)	Sr	Colleyville, TX
G	3	Josh Hagins	6 ft 1 in (1.85 m)	180 lb (82 kg)	Sr	Bossier City, LA
F	5	Oliver Black	6 ft 9 in (2.06 m)	225 lb (102 kg)	So	Jackson, MS
F	10	Maurius Hill	6 ft 5 in (1.96 m)	220 lb (100 kg)	Jr	Homewood, IL
G	11	Jermaine Ruttley	6 ft 3 in (1.91 m)	200 lb (91 kg)	Sr	Radcliff, KY
F	12	Lis Shoshi	6 ft 11 in (2.11 m)	210 lb (95 kg)	Jr	Peje, Kosovo
G	13	Marcus Johnson Jr.	5 ft 11 in (1.8 m)	175 lb (79 kg)	Jr	Charlotte, NC
F	14	Mareik Isom	6 ft 9 in (2.06 m)	215 lb (98 kg)	Jr	Austin, TX
F	15	Stetson Billings	6 ft 5 in (1.96 m)	195 lb (88 kg)	Jr	Strong, AR
G	20	Ben Marcus	6 ft 5 in (1.96 m)	200 lb (91 kg)	Fr	Pine Bluff, AR
G	21	Dayshawn Watkins	6 ft 0 in (1.83 m)	180 lb (82 kg)	Jr	North Little Rock, AR
G	22	Thomas Brandsma	6 ft 5 in (1.96 m)	210 lb (95 kg)	Sr	Colleyville, TX
G	23	Kemy Osse	6 ft 1 in (1.85 m)	208 lb (94 kg)	Jr	Montreal, QC
G	24	Evan Moorman	6 ft 1 in (1.85 m)	200 lb (91 kg)	Jr	Memphis, TN
G	30	Deondre Burns	6 ft 2 in (1.88 m)	175 lb (79 kg)	Fr	Yazoo City, MS

Head coach

- Chris Beard (Texas)

Assistant coach(es)

- Wes Flanigan
- Brian Burg
- Mark Adams

Legend

- (C) Team captain
- (S) Suspended
- (I) Ineligible
- (W) Walk-on
- Injured
- Current redshirt

Roster
Last update: August 22, 2015

== Schedule and results ==
Date time, TV	Rank^{#}	Opponent^{#}	Result	Record	Site (attendance) city, state
Exhibition
11/07/2015*; 7:00 pm		UA–Fort Smith	W 70–60		Jack Stephens Center; Little Rock, AR
Regular season
11/14/2015*; 3:00 pm		Central Baptist	W 76–57	1–0	Jack Stephens Center (1,936); Little Rock, AR
11/18/2015*; 5:15 pm		Centenary	W 95–49	2–0	Jack Stephens Center (2,275); Little Rock, AR
11/21/2015*; 3:00 pm, FSSD		at San Diego State; Las Vegas Invitational	W 49–43	3–0	Viejas Arena (12,414); San Diego, CA
11/26/2015*; 1:00 pm		vs. East Carolina; Las Vegas Invitational	W 54–46	4–0	Orleans Arena (3,125); Paradise, NV
11/28/2015*; 3:00 pm, ESPN3		at Tulsa	W 64–60	5–0	Reynolds Center (3,821); Tulsa, OK
12/01/2015*; 7:00 pm		Central Arkansas	W 79–73	6–0	Jack Stephens Center (3,638); Little Rock, AR
12/05/2015*; 7:00 pm		at Idaho	W 64–54	7–0	Cowan Spectrum (1,154); Moscow, ID
12/12/2015*; 9:00 pm, FS1		at DePaul	W 66–44	8–0	McGrath–Phillips Arena (1,740); Chicago, IL
12/16/2015*; 7:00 pm		at Central Arkansas	W 77–54	9–0	Farris Center (3,055); Conway, AR
12/20/2015*; 1:00 pm		Northern Arizona	W 84–57	10–0	Jack Stephens Center (3,130); Little Rock, AR
12/21/2015*; 2:00 pm, FSSW		at Texas Tech	L 53–65	10–1	United Supermarkets Arena (5,955); Lubbock, TX
12/30/2015; 7:00 pm		at South Alabama	W 69–60	11–1 (1–0)	Mitchell Center (2,314); Mobile, AL
01/02/2016; 4:15 pm		at Troy	W 67–61	12–1 (2–0)	Trojan Arena (1,223); Troy, AL
01/07/2016; 7:15 pm		Louisiana–Lafayette	W 77–57	13–1 (3–0)	Jack Stephens Center (3,218); Little Rock, AR
01/09/2016; 6:00 pm		Louisiana–Monroe	W 58–57	14–1 (4–0)	Jack Stephens Center (3,629); Little Rock, AR
01/14/2016; 7:15 pm		Appalachian State	W 81–55	15–1 (5–0)	Jack Stephens Center (3,543); Little Rock, AR
01/18/2016; 7:30 pm, ESPN3		at Arkansas State	L 73–76	15–2 (5–1)	Convocation Center (2,136); Jonesboro, AR
01/21/2016; 7:30 pm		at Texas State	W 77–74 ^{OT}	16–2 (6–1)	Strahan Coliseum (3,357); San Marcos, TX
01/23/2016; 7:15 pm		at UT Arlington	W 68–62	17–2 (7–1)	College Park Center (5,033); Arlington, TX
01/28/2016; 7:15 pm		Georgia Southern	W 80–67	18–2 (8–1)	Jack Stephens Center (3,078); Little Rock, AR
01/30/2016; 6:00 pm, ESPN3		Georgia State	W 63–53	19–2 (9–1)	Jack Stephens Center (4,682); Little Rock, AR
02/04/2016; 7:15 pm		Troy	W 72–49	20–2 (10–1)	Jack Stephens Center (3,385); Little Rock, AR
02/06/2016; 6:00 pm		South Alabama	W 74–43	21–2 (11–1)	Jack Stephens Center (3,959); Little Rock, AR
02/11/2016; 7:00 pm		at Louisiana–Monroe	L 82–86	21–3 (11–2)	Fant–Ewing Coliseum (3,761); Monroe, LA
02/13/2016; 4:15 pm		at Louisiana–Lafayette	W 68–64	22–3 (12–2)	Cajundome (5,347); Lafayette, LA
02/18/2016; 6:30 pm, ESPN3		at Georgia State	W 57–49	23–3 (13–2)	GSU Sports Arena (1,516); Atlanta, GA
02/20/2016; 6:00 pm		at Georgia Southern	W 75–61	24–3 (14–2)	Hanner Fieldhouse (1,702); Statesboro, GA
02/25/2016; 7:15 pm		UT Arlington	W 72–60	25–3 (15–2)	Jack Stephens Center (5,253); Little Rock, AR
02/27/2016; 6:00 pm		Texas State	W 73–68	26–3 (16–2)	Jack Stephens Center (5,168); Little Rock, AR
03/01/2016; 7:15 pm		Arkansas State	W 89–80	27–3 (17–2)	Jack Stephens Center (5,619); Little Rock, AR
03/03/2016; 6:30 pm, ESPN3		at Appalachian State	L 63–69	27–4 (17–3)	Holmes Center (1,112); Boone, NC
Sun Belt tournament
03/12/2016; 1:00 pm, ESPN3	(1)	vs. (4) Louisiana–Lafayette; Semifinals	W 72–65	28–4	Lakefront Arena; New Orleans, LA
03/13/2016; 12:00 pm, ESPN2	(1)	vs. (2) Louisiana–Monroe; Championship	W 70–50	29–4	Lakefront Arena (1,665); New Orleans, LA
NCAA tournament
03/17/2016*; 3:20 pm, TBS	(12 MW)	vs. (5 MW) No. 12 Purdue; First Round	W 85–83 ^{2OT}	30–4	Pepsi Center (19,499); Denver, CO
03/19/2016*; 5:10 pm, TNT	(12 MW)	vs. (4 MW) No. 22 Iowa State; Second Round	L 61–78	30–5	Pepsi Center (19,551); Denver, CO
*Non-conference game. ^{#}Rankings from AP Poll. (#) Tournament seedings in parentheses. MW=Midwest region. All times are in Central Time.
