= Marcus Evans (basketball) =

American basketball player

SBB Baskets Wolmirstedt
- Position: Point guard
- League: ProA

Personal information
- Born: June 17, 1996 (age 30) Midlothian, Virginia, U.S.
- Listed height: 6 ft 2 in (1.88 m)
- Listed weight: 190 lb (86 kg)

Career information
- High school: Great Bridge (Chesapeake, Virginia); Cape Henry Collegiate (Virginia Beach, Virginia)
- College: Rice (2015–2017); VCU (2018–2020)
- NBA draft: 2020: undrafted
- Playing career: 2021–present

Career history
- 2021–2022: Bristol Flyers
- 2022: Luleå
- 2022–2023: Cheshire Phoenix
- 2024: Pioneros de Los Mochis
- 2025-2026: CSM Targu Jiu
- 2026-Present: SBB Baskets Wolmirstedt

Career highlights
- 2× First-team All-Conference USA (2016, 2017); First-team All-Atlantic 10 (2019)

Aaron Marcus Evans (born June 17, 1996) is an American professional basketball player for the Pioneros de Los Mochis in the Circuito de Baloncesto de la Costa del Pacífico (CIBACOPA). He played college basketball for the Rice Owls and the VCU Rams.

== High school career ==
Evans began his high school career at Great Bridge High School before transferring to Cape Henry Collegiate School. Evans averaged 12.6 points, five assists and four steals per game as a junior. As a senior, Evans led the team to a state title. He signed with Rice in June 2014.

== College career ==
Evans was named Conference USA freshman of the week ten times, including the final six weeks. As a freshman, Evans led Rice in scoring at 21.4 points per game. He was named Conference USA Freshman of the Year and First-Team All-Conference USA. Evans averaged 19 points per game as a sophomore, setting the C-USA sophomore scoring record with 665 points. He was again named to the First Team All-Conference USA. After his sophomore season, coach Mike Rhoades left to become the coach of VCU and Evans decided to transfer. He ended up following Rhoades to VCU.

Evans was forced to sit out a season as a redshirt, but tore his ACL twice during his redshirt year. He scored nine points in his debut for VCU against Gardner-Webb. As a junior, Evans averaged 13.6 points, 3.2 assists, 3.1 rebounds and 1.9 steals per game. Evans was named to the First Team All-Atlantic 10 and All-Academic Team. Evans bruised his left knee in a loss in the Atlantic 10 tournament quarterfinals to Rhode Island. Playing through the pain, he returned for the NCAA tournament appearance and scored six points in the 73–58 loss to UCF in the round of 64.

Coming into his senior year, Evans was named to the Bob Cousy Award preseason watchlist. Evans was benched by the team on January 4, 2020 in a game against George Mason for a discipline issue. On January 28, Evans scored his 2,000th career point in a win against crosstown rival Richmond, finishing with nine points and three assists. He averaged 9.8 points and 2.8 assists per game as a senior.

== Professional career ==
On June 8, 2021, he signed his first professional contract with the Bristol Flyers of the British Basketball League.

On July 28, 2021, Evans signed with BC Luleå of the Swedish Basketball League. During that season, he joined Cheshire Phoenix of the British Basketball League. After the conclusion of the 2022-2023 season, Evans was named Eurobasket.com All-British BBL Honorable Mention for 2023.

Evans signed with the Pioneros de Los Mochis of the Circuito de Baloncesto de la Costa del Pacífico (CIBACOPA) in Mexico ahead of the 2024 CIBACOPA season.

== Career statistics ==
Legend
GP	Games played	GS	Games started	MPG	Minutes per game
FG%	Field goal percentage	3P%	3-point field goal percentage	FT%	Free throw percentage
RPG	Rebounds per game	APG	Assists per game	SPG	Steals per game
BPG	Blocks per game	PPG	Points per game	**Bold**	Career high

=== College ===
Year	Team	GP	GS	MPG	FG%	3P%	FT%	RPG	APG	SPG	BPG	PPG
2015–16	Rice	32	32	**33.5**	**.470**	.306	**.796**	**4.0**	2.8	**2.2**	**.2**	**21.4**
2016–17	Rice	**35**	**34**	31.7	.425	.376	.787	3.3	**3.7**	1.1	.1	19.0
2017–18	VCU	Redshirt										
2018–19	VCU	33	30	26.8	.427	.273	.773	3.1	3.2	2.0	**.2**	13.6
2019–20	VCU	25	22	23.6	.370	**.379**	.743	1.9	2.8	1.4	.1	9.8
Career		125	118	29.3	.433	.333	.780	3.1	3.2	1.7	.1	16.4
