= 2015–16 Louisiana Tech Bulldogs basketball team =

American college basketball season

2015–16 Louisiana Tech Bulldogs basketball

Vegas 16, Quarterfinals
- Conference: Conference USA
- Record: 23–10 (12–6 C-USA)
- Head coach: Eric Konkol (1st season)
- Assistant coaches: Duffy Conroy; Corey Barker; Tony Skinn
- Home arena: Thomas Assembly Center

2015–16 Conference USA men's basketball standings
	Conf.				Overall
Team	W		L	PCT	W		L	PCT
UAB	16	–	2	.889	26	–	7	.788
Middle Tennessee †	13	–	5	.722	25	–	10	.714
Marshall	12	–	6	.667	17	–	16	.515
Louisiana Tech	12	–	6	.667	23	–	10	.697
Old Dominion	12	–	6	.667	25	–	13	.658
UTEP	10	–	8	.556	19	–	14	.576
Charlotte	9	–	9	.500	14	–	19	.424
Western Kentucky	8	–	10	.444	18	–	16	.529
North Texas	7	–	11	.389	12	–	20	.375
Rice	7	–	11	.389	12	–	20	.375
FIU	7	–	11	.389	13	–	19	.406
Florida Atlantic	5	–	13	.278	8	–	25	.242
Southern Miss*	5	–	13	.278	8	–	21	.276
UTSA	3	–	15	.167	5	–	27	.156
† 2016 C-USA Tournament winner *Ineligible for postseason play due to self-imposed postseason ban.

The 2015–16 Louisiana Tech Bulldogs basketball team represented Louisiana Tech University during the 2015–16 NCAA Division I men's basketball season. The Bulldogs, led by first year head coach Eric Konkol, played their home games at the Thomas Assembly Center and were members of Conference USA. They finished the season 23–10, 12–6 in C-USA play to finish in three-way tie for third place. They lost in the quarterfinals of the C-USA tournament to Old Dominion. They were invited to the inaugural Vegas 16, which only had eight teams, where they lost in the quarterfinals to East Tennessee State.

== Previous season ==
The Bulldogs finished the 2014–15 season 27–9, 15–3 in C-USA play to finish as regular season C-USA champions. They advanced to the semifinals of the C-USA tournament where they lost to UAB. As a regular season conference champion who failed to win their conference tournament, they received an automatic bid to the National Invitation Tournament where they defeated Central Michigan in the first round and Texas A&M in the second round before losing in the quarterfinals to Temple.

== Departures ==
Name	Number	Pos.	Height	Weight	Year	Hometown	Notes
Michale Kyser	1	F	6'10"	205	Senior	Lancaster, TX	Graduated
Raheem Appleby	3	G	6'4"	160	Senior	Jacksonville, AR	Graduated
Speedy Smith	4	G	6'3"	180	Senior	St. Petersburg, FL	Graduated
Xavian Stapleton	11	G	6'6"	190	Freshman	Flora, MS	Transferred to Mississippi State
Leo Edwards	33	F	6'8"	225	RS Freshman	Detroit, MI	Transferred to IPFW

=== Incoming transfers ===
Name	Number	Pos.	Height	Weight	Year	Hometown	Notes
DaShawn Robinson	23	G	6'4"	190	Junior	Houston, Texas	Junior college transferred from Navarro College

== Recruiting class of 2015 ==
College recruiting information
Name	Hometown	School	Height	Weight	Commit date
Derric Jean; SG	Hollywood, FL	McArthur High School	6 ft 1 in (1.85 m)	165 lb (75 kg)	Jun 16, 2015
Derric Jean; SG	Recruit ratings: Scout: Rivals: (78)				
Jy'Lan Washington; SF	Smyrna, TN	Stewarts Creek School	6 ft 7 in (2.01 m)	175 lb (79 kg)	Jun 8, 2015
Jy'Lan Washington; SF	Recruit ratings: Scout: Rivals: (0)				
Overall recruit ranking:
Note: In many cases, Scout, Rivals, 247Sports, On3, and ESPN may conflict in their listings of height and weight.; In these cases, the average was taken. ESPN grades are on a 100-point scale.; Sources: "2015 Team Ranking". Rivals.

== Roster ==
2015–16 Louisiana Tech Bulldogs men's basketball team
Players
Coaches

Pos.	#	Name	Height	Weight	Year	Hometown
G	0	Alex Hamilton	6 ft 4 in (1.93 m)	190 lb (86 kg)	Sr	Chipley, FL
G	1	Derric Jean	6 ft 2 in (1.88 m)	170 lb (77 kg)	Fr	Miami, FL
F	2	Erik McCree	6 ft 8 in (2.03 m)	220 lb (100 kg)	RS Jr	Orlando, FL
C	5	Joniah White	7 ft 0 in (2.13 m)	210 lb (95 kg)	So	Duck Hill, MS
G	10	Dayon Griffin	6 ft 5 in (1.96 m)	188 lb (85 kg)	So	St. Petersburg, FL
G	13	Jacobi Boykins	6 ft 6 in (1.98 m)	160 lb (73 kg)	So	St. Petersburg, FL
F	15	Branden Sheppard	6 ft 7 in (2.01 m)	225 lb (102 kg)	RS Fr	Shreveport, LA
F	21	Merrill Holden	6 ft 8 in (2.03 m)	215 lb (98 kg)	Jr	Lincoln, NE
F	22	Jy'lan Washington	6 ft 8 in (2.03 m)	180 lb (82 kg)	Fr	Smyrna, TN
G	23	Da'Shawn Robinson	6 ft 4 in (1.93 m)	200 lb (91 kg)	Jr	Houston, TX
G	25	Qiydar Davis	6 ft 6 in (1.98 m)	200 lb (91 kg)	Sr	Atlanta, GA

Head coach

- Eric Konkol (UW–Eau Claire)

Assistant coach(es)

- Duffy Conroy (St. Ambrose)
- Corey Barker (Prairie View A&M)
- Tony Skinn (George Mason)

Legend

- (C) Team captain
- (S) Suspended
- (I) Ineligible
- (W) Walk-on
- Injured
- Current redshirt

Roster

== Schedule ==
Date time, TV	Opponent	Result	Record	Site (attendance) city, state
Exhibition
11/05/2015*; 6:30 pm	Southwest Baptist	W 87–53		Thomas Assembly Center; Ruston, LA
Non-conference regular season
11/13/2015*; 6:30 pm	Millsaps	W 95–33	1–0	Thomas Assembly Center (3,513); Ruston, LA
11/17/2015*; 6:30 pm	Texas–Arlington; Hoophall Miami Invitational	W 80–68	2–0	Thomas Assembly Center (3,012); Ruston, LA
11/21/2015*; 7:00 pm	at Grambling State; Hoophall Miami Invitational	W 86–67	3–0	Fredrick C. Hobdy Assembly Center (1,504); Grambling, LA
11/24/2015*; 7:00 pm, BTN	at Ohio State; Hoophall Miami Invitational	W 82–74	4–0	Value City Arena (11,572); Columbus, OH
11/27/2015*; 6:30 pm	North Carolina Central	W 71–50	5–0	Thomas Assembly Center (4,227); Ruston, LA
12/01/2015*; 8:00 pm, CBSSN	at Memphis; Hoophall Miami Invitational	L 68–94	5–1	FedEx Forum (11,114); Memphis, TN
12/04/2015*; 6:30 pm	Jackson State	W 95–88 ^{2OT}	6–1	Thomas Assembly Center (3,504); Ruston, LA
12/08/2015*; 6:30 pm	LSU–Shreveport	W 82–49	7–1	Thomas Assembly Center (3,612); Ruston, LA
12/12/2015*; 12:00 pm, ASN	Louisiana–Lafayette	W 91–79	8–1	Thomas Assembly Center (3,912); Ruston, LA
12/15/2015*; 6:00 pm, SECN	at Ole Miss	L 80–99	8–2	Tad Smith Coliseum (5,606); Oxford, MS
12/18/2015*; 6:30 pm	Southern	W 83–76	9–2	Thomas Assembly Center (2,519); Ruston, LA
12/22/2015*; 6:00 pm, ESPN3	at Florida Gulf Coast	W 66–63	10–2	Alico Arena (3,514); Fort Myers, FL
12/28/2015*; 6:00 pm	Prairie View A&M	W 77–58	11–2	Thomas Assembly Center (2,528); Ruston, LA
Conference USA regular season
01/02/2016; 6:00 pm	Southern Miss	W 87–57	12–2 (1–0)	Thomas Assembly Center (3,302); Ruston, LA
01/07/2016; 8:30 pm, CBSSN	Old Dominion	L 53–56	12–3 (1–1)	Thomas Assembly Center (4,807); Ruston, LA
01/09/2016; 6:00 pm	Charlotte	W 93–90 ^{OT}	13–3 (2–1)	Thomas Assembly Center (4,209); Ruston, LA
01/14/2016; 6:00 pm	at FIU	L 74–88	13–4 (2–2)	FIU Arena (1,240); Miami, FL
01/16/2016; 6:00 pm	at Florida Atlantic	L 61–63	13–5 (2–3)	FAU Arena; Boca Raton, FL
01/23/2016; 7:00 pm, ASN	at Southern Miss	W 70–59	14–5 (3–3)	Reed Green Coliseum (3,334); Hattiesburg, MS
01/28/2016; 6:30 pm	UTSA	W 85–75	15–5 (4–3)	Thomas Assembly Center (3,428); Ruston, LA
01/31/2016; 3:00 pm, FSN	UTEP	W 78–70	16–5 (5–3)	Thomas Assembly Center (4,131); Ruston, LA
02/04/2016; 7:00 pm	at Rice	W 90–78	17–5 (6–3)	Tudor Fieldhouse (1,660); Houston, TX
02/06/2016; 3:00 pm, ASN	at North Texas	L 69–80	17–6 (6–4)	The Super Pit (4,610); Denton, TX
02/11/2016; 8:00 pm, ASN	Middle Tennessee	W 73–63	18–6 (7–4)	Thomas Assembly Center (5,011); Ruston, LA
02/13/2016; 1:00 pm, FSN	UAB	W 85–76	19–6 (8–4)	Thomas Assembly Center (5,213); Ruston, LA
02/18/2016; 7:00 pm	at UTSA	W 87–74	20–6 (9–4)	Convocation Center (1,258); San Antonio, TX
02/20/2016; 5:00 pm, CBSSN	at UTEP	L 80–91	20–7 (9–5)	Don Haskins Center (7,313); El Paso, TX
02/25/2016; 6:30 pm	North Texas	W 73–62 ^{OT}	21–7 (10–5)	Thomas Assembly Center (3,092); Ruston, LA
02/27/2016; 6:00 pm	Rice	W 88–69	22–7 (11–5)	Thomas Assembly Center (5,527); Ruston, LA
03/03/2016; 6:00 pm, ASN	at Marshall	W 97–94	23–7 (12–5)	Cam Henderson Center (5,945); Huntington, WV
03/05/2016; 7:00 pm	at WKU	L 90–96 ^{OT}	23–8 (12–6)	E. A. Diddle Arena (4,591); Bowling Green, KY
Conference USA tournament
03/10/2016; 2:30 pm, ASN	vs. Old Dominion; Quarterfinals	L 52–68	23–9	Legacy Arena (9,797); Birmingham, AL
Vegas 16
03/28/2016*; 8:00 pm, CBSSN	vs. East Tennessee State; Quarterfinals	L 83–88	23–10	Mandalay Bay Events Center; Paradise, NV
*Non-conference game. (#) Tournament seedings in parentheses. All times are in Central Time.
