= 2015–16 Appalachian State Mountaineers men's basketball team =

American college basketball season

2015–16 Appalachian State Mountaineers men's basketball
- Conference: Sun Belt Conference
- Record: 9–22 (7–13 Sun Belt)
- Head coach: Jim Fox (2nd season)
- Assistant coaches: Jason Allison; Bryan Lentz; Mantoris Robinson
- Home arena: George M. Holmes Convocation Center

2015–16 Sun Belt Conference men's basketball standings
	Conf.				Overall
Team	W		L	PCT	W		L	PCT
Little Rock †	17	–	3	.850	30	–	5	.857
Louisiana–Monroe	15	–	5	.750	20	–	14	.588
Texas–Arlington	13	–	7	.650	24	–	11	.686
Louisiana–Lafayette	12	–	8	.600	19	–	15	.559
Georgia Southern	10	–	10	.500	14	–	17	.452
Georgia State	9	–	11	.450	16	–	14	.533
Texas State	8	–	12	.400	15	–	16	.484
South Alabama	8	–	12	.400	14	–	19	.424
Arkansas State	7	–	13	.350	11	–	20	.355
Appalachian State	7	–	13	.350	9	–	22	.290
Troy	4	–	16	.200	9	–	22	.290
† 2016 Sun Belt Conference tournament winner

The 2015–16 Appalachian State Mountaineers men's basketball team represented Appalachian State University during the 2015–16 NCAA Division I men's basketball season. The Mountaineers, led by second-year head coach Jim Fox, played their home games at the George M. Holmes Convocation Center and were members of the Sun Belt Conference. They finished the season 9–22, 7–13 in Sun Belt play, to finish in a tie for ninth place. They failed to qualify for the Sun Belt tournament.

== Roster ==
Number	Name	Position	Height	Weight	Year	Hometown
0	Mike Kobani	Forward	6–8	265	Junior	Bida, Nigeria
1	Landon Goesling	Guard	6–2	175	Sophomore	Irving, TX
2	Ronshad Shabazz	Guard	6–5	212	Freshman	Raleigh, NC
3	Dustin Clarke	Guard	6–3	178	Senior	Newland, NC
4	Michael Obacha	Forward	6–8	218	Senior	Edo State, Nigeria
5	Griffin Kinney	Forward	6–8	237	Sophomore	Delaware, OH
10	Chris Burgess	Guard	5–8	180	Senior	Lakeland, FL
11	Emarius Logan	Guard	6–2	187	Freshman	Columbia, SC
12	Craig Hinton	Forward	6–7	200	Junior	Winston-Salem, NC
13	Kevin Kerley	Guard	5–11	171	Freshman	Loveland, OH
14	Bennett Holley	Forward	6–8	220	Freshman	Roanoke, VA
15	Jake Wilson	Center	7–1	230	Sophomore	Raleigh, NC
20	Dylan Hodson	Guard	6–3	181	Sophomore	Roanoke, VA
21	Frank Eaves	Guard	6–2	183	Senior	Greensboro, NC
23	Trey Ford	Guard	6–0	175	Freshman	Mooresville, NC
24	Jalen Sanders	Guard	5–10	160	Sophomore	Charlotte, NC
25	Jake Babic	Guard	6–5	187	Sophomore	Oakville, ON
31	Hudson Terrell	Forward	6–4	185	Freshman	Columbus, GA
32	Tyrell Johnson	Forward	6–8	200	Freshman	Atlanta, GA
33	John Mosser	Guard	6–5	210	Junior	Cary, NC
34	Jacob Lawson	Guard	6–8	230	Junior	Reidsville, NC

== Schedule ==
Date time, TV	Opponent	Result	Record	Site (attendance) city, state
Exhibition
11/03/2015*; 7:00 p.m.	Belmont Abbey	W 80–60		Holmes Center (706); Boone, NC
Regular season
11/14/2015*; 2:00 p.m.	Jacksonville	W 76–68	1–0	Holmes Center (767); Boone, NC
11/17/2015*; 7:00 p.m., ESPN3	Furman	L 70–79	1–1	Holmes Center (1,090); Boone, NC
11/20/2015*; 6:00 p.m.	at Hampton	L 61–82	1–2	Hampton Convocation Center (5,124); Hampton, VA
11/22/2015*; 4:30 p.m., ESPN3	at Tulane; Challenge in Music City	L 48–76	1–3	Devlin Fieldhouse (962); New Orleans, LA
11/26/2015*; 3:00 p.m., ASN	vs. Liberty; Challenge in Music City	W 73–62	2–3	Nashville Municipal Auditorium (350); Nashville, TN
11/27/2015*; 5:00 p.m.	vs. Mercer; Challenge in Music City	L 70–71	2–4	Nashville Municipal Auditorium; Nashville, TN
11/29/2015*; 4:30 p.m., ASN	vs. Stephen F. Austin; Challenge in Music City	L 84–94	2–5	Nashville Municipal Auditorium; Nashville, TN
12/06/2015*; 1:00 p.m.	vs. Hofstra; MSG Holiday Festival	L 80–86	2–6	Madison Square Garden (7,196); New York City, NY
12/15/2015*; 8:00 p.m., LHN	at Texas	L 55–67	2–7	Frank Erwin Center (10,529); Austin, TX
12/19/2015*; 2:00 p.m.	Charlotte	L 66–82	2–8	Holmes Center (376); Boone, NC
12/21/2015*; 7:00 p.m., ESPN2	at No. 7 North Carolina	L 70–94	2–9	Dean Smith Center (18,336); Chapel Hill, NC
12/31/2015; 3:00 p.m.	at Louisiana–Monroe	L 56–72	2–10 (0–1)	Fant–Ewing Coliseum (1,278); Monroe, LA
01/02/2016; 8:15 p.m.	at Louisiana–Lafayette	L 58–79	2–11 (0–2)	Cajundome (4,131); Lafayette, LA
01/07/2016; 7:30 p.m., ESPN3	UT Arlington	L 67–71	2–12 (0–3)	Holmes Center (870); Boone, NC
01/09/2016; 3:30 p.m., ESPN3	Texas State	W 76–56	3–12 (1–3)	Holmes Center (1,246); Boone, NC
01/14/2016; 8:15 p.m.	at Little Rock	L 55–81	3–13 (1–4)	Jack Stephens Center (3,543); Little Rock, AR
01/16/2016; 8:00 p.m., ESPN3	at Arkansas State	W 86–72	4–13 (2–4)	Convocation Center (1,615); Jonesboro, AR
01/21/2016; 7:30 p.m., ESPN3	Georgia State	W 76–67	5–13 (3–4)	Holmes Center (1,450); Boone, NC
01/25/2016; 6:30 p.m., ESPN3	Georgia Southern; Postponed from 1/23	L 100–101	5–14 (3–5)	Holmes Center (1,080); Boone, NC
01/28/2016; 8:30 p.m.	at Troy	W 75–71	6–14 (4–5)	Trojan Arena (1,270); Troy, AL
01/30/2016; 8:00 p.m.	at South Alabama	L 60–73	6–15 (4–6)	Mitchell Center (2,231); Mobile, AL
02/04/2016; 7:30 p.m., ESPN3	Louisiana–Lafayette	L 76–87	6–16 (4–7)	Holmes Center (1,325); Boone, NC
02/06/2016; 3:30 p.m., ESPN3	Louisiana–Monroe	L 90–91	6–17 (4–8)	Holmes Center (1,509); Boone, NC
02/11/2016; 8:30 p.m.	at Texas State	L 68–69	6–18 (4–9)	Strahan Coliseum (2,375); San Marcos, TX
02/13/2016; 8:15 p.m.	at UT Arlington	L 60–91	6–19 (4–10)	College Park Center (2,141); Arlington, TX
02/18/2016; 7:30 p.m., ESPN3	South Alabama	L 71–75	6–20 (4–11)	Holmes Center (1,253); Boone, NC
02/20/2016; 3:30 p.m., ESPN3	Troy	W 78–74	7–20 (5–11)	Holmes Center (2,069); Boone, NC
02/25/2016; 7:30 p.m.	at Georgia Southern	L 63–88	7–21 (5–12)	Hanner Fieldhouse (2,129); Statesboro, GA
02/27/2016; 7:30 p.m., ESPN3	at Georgia State	L 70–83	7–22 (5–13)	GSU Sports Arena (1,784); Atlanta, GA
03/03/2016; 7:30 p.m., ESPN3	Little Rock	W 69–63	8–22 (6–13)	Holmes Center (1,112); Boone, NC
03/05/2016; 3:30 p.m., ESPN3	Arkansas State	W 80–73	9–22 (7–13)	Holmes Center (1,618); Boone, NC
*Non-conference game. ^{#}Rankings from AP poll. (#) Tournament seedings in parentheses. All times are in Eastern Time.
