= 2015–16 South Alabama Jaguars men's basketball team =

American college basketball season

2015–16 South Alabama Jaguars men's basketball
- Conference: Sun Belt Conference
- Record: 14–19 (8–12 Sun Belt)
- Head coach: Matthew Graves (3rd season)
- Assistant coaches: Darnell Archey; Russ Willemsen; Brock Morris
- Home arena: Mitchell Center

2015–16 Sun Belt Conference men's basketball standings
	Conf.				Overall
Team	W		L	PCT	W		L	PCT
Little Rock †	17	–	3	.850	30	–	5	.857
Louisiana–Monroe	15	–	5	.750	20	–	14	.588
Texas–Arlington	13	–	7	.650	24	–	11	.686
Louisiana–Lafayette	12	–	8	.600	19	–	15	.559
Georgia Southern	10	–	10	.500	14	–	17	.452
Georgia State	9	–	11	.450	16	–	14	.533
Texas State	8	–	12	.400	15	–	16	.484
South Alabama	8	–	12	.400	14	–	19	.424
Arkansas State	7	–	13	.350	11	–	20	.355
Appalachian State	7	–	13	.350	9	–	22	.290
Troy	4	–	16	.200	9	–	22	.290
† 2016 Sun Belt Conference tournament winner

The 2015–16 South Alabama Jaguars basketball team represented the University of South Alabama during the 2015–16 NCAA Division I men's basketball season. The Jaguars, led by third year head coach Matthew Graves, played third home games at the Mitchell Center and were members of the Sun Belt Conference. They finished the season 14–19, 8–12 in Sun Belt play to finish in a tie for seventh place. They defeated Georgia Southern in the first round of the Sun Belt tournament to advance to the quarterfinals where they lost to Louisiana–Lafayette.

== Roster ==
Number	Name	Position	Height	Weight	Year	Hometown
0	Shaq Calhoun	Guard	6–4	205	Sophomore	Rome, Georgia
1	Ken Williams	Guard	6–3	190	Junior	Houston, Texas
4	Barrington Stevens III	Guard	5–11	182	Senior	Allen, Texas
5	Don MuepoKelly	Forward	6–7	238	Junior	Fontana, California
10	Georgi Boyanov	Forward	6–7	210	Junior	Lovech, Bulgaria
11	Nikola Marijan	Forward	7–1	235	Freshman	Bački Brestovac, Serbia
14	Devin Epps	Guard	5–11	175	Sophomore	Murfreesboro, Tennessee
20	Tafari Whittingham	Forward	6–8	215	Junior	Brooklyn, New York
21	Nick Davis	Guard	6–6	185	Sophomore	Mt. Vernon, Alabama
22	John Brown	Guard	6–4	200	Senior	Charlotte, North Carolina
24	Nick Stover	Forward	6–6	200	Junior	Los Angeles, California
30	Ethan Haslam	Forward	6–4	182	Freshman	Lithia, Florida
42	Trhae Mitchell	Forward	6–6	184	Freshman	Austell, Georgia
	Josh Ajayi	Forward	6–7	260	Freshman	El Monte, California
	Lance Crawford	Guard	5–10	170	Sophomore	Davie, Florida

== Schedule ==
Date time, TV	Rank^{#}	Opponent^{#}	Result	Record	Site (attendance) city, state
Exhibition
11/05/2015*; 7:00 pm		Mobile	W 98–43		Mitchell Center (2,841); Mobile, AL
Regular season
11/13/2015*; 7:00 pm		Auburn–Montgomery	W 88–68	1–0	Mitchell Center (2,398); Mobile, AL
11/15/2015*; 5:00 pm, ESPNU		at NC State; Legends Classic	L 70–88	1–1	PNC Arena (15,076); Raleigh, NC
11/19/2015*; 8:00 pm, SECN		at No. 23 LSU; Legends Classic	L 66–78	1–2	Pete Maravich Assembly Center (9,758); Baton Rouge, LA
11/23/2015*; 3:00 pm		vs. Belmont; Legends Classic	L 85–98	1–3	KSU Convocation Center (1,262); Kennesaw, GA
11/24/2015*; 3:00 pm		vs. IUPUI; Legends Classic	W 78–68	2–3	KSU Convocation Center (208); Kennesaw, GA
11/28/2015*; 3:00 pm		at Denver	L 56–69	2–4	Magness Arena (1,138); Denver, CO
11/30/2015*; 7:00 pm		Spring Hill	W 79–50	3–4	Mitchell Center (2,106); Mobile, AL
12/05/2015*; 5:00 pm		at Middle Tennessee	L 55–68	3–5	Murphy Center (4,106); Murfreesboro, TN
12/14/2015*; 7:00 pm		Southern Miss	L 54–57	3–6	Mitchell Center (3,146); Mobile, AL
12/18/2015*; 7:00 pm		at Samford	W 72–70 ^{2OT}	4–6	Pete Hanna Center (1,864); Homewood, AL
12/22/2015*; 7:00 pm		Rice	W 74–67	5–6	Mitchell Center (1,937); Mobile, AL
12/30/2015; 7:00 pm		Arkansas–Little Rock	L 60–69	5–7 (0–1)	Mitchell Center (2,314); Mobile, AL
01/02/2016; 4:00 pm		Arkansas State	L 67–89	5–8 (0–2)	Mitchell Center (1,808); Mobile, AL
01/07/2016; 6:30 pm		at Georgia Southern	W 64–58	6–8 (1–2)	Hanner Fieldhouse (1,003); Statesboro, GA
01/09/2016; 1:30 pm, ESPN3		at Georgia State	L 55–70	6–9 (1–3)	GSU Sports Arena (1,614); Atlanta, GA
01/14/2016; 7:00 pm		Texas State	L 67–78	6–10 (1–4)	Mitchell Center (2,084); Mobile, AL
01/16/2016; 4:00 pm		UT Arlington	W 88–85 ^{OT}	7–10 (2–4)	Mitchell Center (2,102); Mobile, AL
01/21/2016; 7:15 pm		at Louisiana–Lafayette	L 82–92	7–11 (2–5)	Cajundome (4,050); Lafayette, LA
01/23/2016; 4:00 pm		at Louisiana–Monroe	L 68–100	7–12 (2–6)	Fant–Ewing Coliseum (1,556); Monroe, LA
01/26/2016; 7:30 pm		at Troy	W 66–58	8–12 (3–6)	Trojan Arena (2,224); Troy, AL
01/30/2016; 7:00 pm		Appalachian State	W 73–60	9–12 (4–6)	Mitchell Center (2,231); Mobile, AL
02/04/2016; 7:30 pm, ESPN3		at Arkansas State	L 73–79 ^{OT}	9–13 (4–7)	Convocation Center (1,526); Jonesboro, AR
02/06/2016; 6:00 pm		at Arkansas–Little Rock	L 43–74	9–14 (4–8)	Jack Stephens Center (3,959); Little Rock, AR
02/11/2016; 7:00 pm		Georgia State	W 79–78 ^{OT}	10–14 (5–8)	Mitchell Center (1,956); Mobile, AL
02/13/2016; 4:00 pm, ESPN3		Georgia Southern	W 80–76	11–14 (6–8)	Mitchell Center; Mobile, AL
02/16/2016; 7:00 pm		Troy	L 54–61	11–15 (6–9)	Mitchell Center (3,027); Mobile, AL
02/18/2016; 6:30 pm, ESPN3		at Appalachian State	W 75–71	12–15 (7–9)	Holmes Center (1,253); Boone, NC
02/25/2016; 7:00 pm		Louisiana–Monroe	L 59–66	12–16 (7–10)	Mitchell Center (1,877); Mobile, AL
02/27/2016; 4:00 pm		Louisiana–Lafayette	W 83–70	13–16 (8–10)	Mitchell Center; Mobile, AL
03/03/2016; 7:15 pm		at UT Arlington	L 79–92	13–17 (8–11)	College Park Center (2,408); Arlington, TX
03/05/2016; 4:30 pm		at Texas State	L 57–68	13–18 (8–12)	Strahan Coliseum (2,001); San Marcos, TX
Sun Belt tournament
03/10/2016; 5:00 pm, ESPN3		vs. Georgia Southern; First round	L 61–67	14–18	Lakefront Arena (703); New Orleans, LA
03/11/2016; 5:00 pm, ESPN3		vs. Louisiana–Lafayette; Quarterfinals	L 68–90	14–19	Lakefront Arena (907); New Orleans, LA
*Non-conference game. ^{#}Rankings from AP Poll. (#) Tournament seedings in parentheses. All times are in Central Time.
