= 2015–16 Southern Miss Golden Eagles basketball team =

American college basketball season

2015–16 Southern Miss Golden Eagles basketball
- Conference: Conference USA
- Record: 8–21 (5–13 C-USA)
- Head coach: Doc Sadler (2nd season)
- Assistant coaches: Jeremy Cox; Tom Schuberth; Marques Townsend
- Home arena: Reed Green Coliseum

2015–16 Conference USA men's basketball standings
	Conf.				Overall
Team	W		L	PCT	W		L	PCT
UAB	16	–	2	.889	26	–	7	.788
Middle Tennessee †	13	–	5	.722	25	–	10	.714
Marshall	12	–	6	.667	17	–	16	.515
Louisiana Tech	12	–	6	.667	23	–	10	.697
Old Dominion	12	–	6	.667	25	–	13	.658
UTEP	10	–	8	.556	19	–	14	.576
Charlotte	9	–	9	.500	14	–	19	.424
Western Kentucky	8	–	10	.444	18	–	16	.529
North Texas	7	–	11	.389	12	–	20	.375
Rice	7	–	11	.389	12	–	20	.375
FIU	7	–	11	.389	13	–	19	.406
Florida Atlantic	5	–	13	.278	8	–	25	.242
Southern Miss*	5	–	13	.278	8	–	21	.276
UTSA	3	–	15	.167	5	–	27	.156
† 2016 C-USA Tournament winner *Ineligible for postseason play due to self-imposed postseason ban.

The 2015–16 Southern Miss Golden Eagles men's basketball team represented the University of Southern Mississippi during the 2015–16 NCAA Division I men's basketball season. The Golden Eagles, led by second year head coach Doc Sadler, played their home games at Reed Green Coliseum and were members of Conference USA. They finished the season 8–21, 5–13 in C-USA play to finish in a tie for 12th place.

Due to an ongoing NCAA investigation into NCAA violations and illegal benefits for players under former coach Donnie Tyndall, they self-imposed a postseason ban for the second consecutive year, which included the C-USA tournament.

== Previous season ==
The Golden Eagles finished the 2014–15 season 9–20, 4–14 in C-USA play to finish in 13th place. Due to an ongoing NCAA investigation into illegal benefits for players under former coach Donnie Tyndall, the school self-imposed a postseason ban which included the C-USA tournament.

== Departures ==
Name	Number	Pos.	Height	Weight	Year	Hometown	Notes
Shadell Millinghaus	0	G	6'0"	194	Sophomore	Brooklyn, NY	Transferred to Northwest Florida State College
Matt Bigaya	2	G/F	6'5"	200	RS Sophomore	Delaware, OH	Transferred to Fairmont State
Davon Hayes	3	G/F	6'7"	190	RS Freshman	Portsmouth, VA	Transferred
Dallas Anglin	4	G	6'2"	180	Junior	Montclair, NJ	Transferred to Northern Colorado
Chip Armelin	13	G	6'4"	207	RS Senior	Sulphur, LA	Graduated
Jeremiah Eason	34	F	6'7"	230	Senior	Fort Lauderdale, FL	Graduated

=== Incoming transfers ===
Name	Number	Pos.	Height	Weight	Year	Hometown	Previous School
Raheem Watts	0	F	6'7"	210	Junior	Greenville, SC	Junior college transferred from Dodge City Community College
Kourtlin Jackson	2	G	6'4"	190	RS Senior	Des Moines, IA	Transferred from Iowa State. Will be eligible to play immediately since Jackson graduated from Iowa State.
Michael Ramey	11	G	6'5"	198	Junior	Indianapolis, IN	Junior college transferred from Seminole State College
Lorenzo Bonam		G	6'4"	170	Junior	Dearborn Heights, MI	Junior college transferred from Gillette College

== Recruiting class of 2015 ==
College recruiting information
Name	Hometown	School	Height	Weight	Commit date
Tim Rowe; C	Lilburn, GA	Mount Zion Baptist Christian School	6 ft 9 in (2.06 m)	215 lb (98 kg)	Apr 15, 2015
Tim Rowe; C	Recruit ratings: Scout: Rivals: (70)				
Robert Thomas; PG	Odessa, TX	Permian High School	6 ft 0 in (1.83 m)	180 lb (82 kg)	Mar 9, 2015
Robert Thomas; PG	Recruit ratings: Scout: Rivals: (NR)				
Cortez Edwards; PG	Kissimmee, FL	Osceola High School	6 ft 1 in (1.85 m)	170 lb (77 kg)	Mar 21, 2015
Cortez Edwards; PG	Recruit ratings: Scout: Rivals: (NR)				
Overall recruit ranking:
Note: In many cases, Scout, Rivals, 247Sports, On3, and ESPN may conflict in their listings of height and weight.; In these cases, the average was taken. ESPN grades are on a 100-point scale.; Sources: "2015 Team Ranking". Rivals.

== Roster ==
2015–16 Southern Miss Golden Eagles men's basketball team
Players
Coaches

Pos.	#	Name	Height	Weight	Year	Hometown
F	0	Raheem Watts	6 ft 7 in (2.01 m)	216 lb (98 kg)	Jr	Greenville, SC
G	1	Cortez Edwards	6 ft 2 in (1.88 m)	170 lb (77 kg)	Fr	Kissimmee, FL
G	2	Kourtlin Jackson	6 ft 4 in (1.93 m)	190 lb (86 kg)	RS Sr	Des Moines, IA
G	3	Rob Thomas III	6 ft 4 in (1.93 m)	190 lb (86 kg)	Fr	Odessa, TX
G	4	Christian Clark (W)	6 ft 0 in (1.83 m)	175 lb (79 kg)	Fr	Hattiesburg, MS
G	5	Khari Price	5 ft 9 in (1.75 m)	175 lb (79 kg)	RS Jr	Slidell, LA
G	10	Keljin Blevins	6 ft 4 in (1.93 m)	200 lb (91 kg)	So	Hot Spring, AR
G	11	Michael Ramey	6 ft 5 in (1.96 m)	183 lb (83 kg)	Jr	Indianapolis, IN
F	12	Tim Rowe	6 ft 11 in (2.11 m)	220 lb (100 kg)	Fr	Lilburn, GA
F	14	Michael O'Donnell	6 ft 6 in (1.98 m)	188 lb (85 kg)	Sr	Chicago, IL
F	15	Eddie Davis III (W)	6 ft 7 in (2.01 m)	248 lb (112 kg)	So	Las Vegas, NV
G	20	Kevin Holland	6 ft 1 in (1.85 m)	175 lb (79 kg)	So	Tuscaloosa, AL
F	21	Norville Carey (W)	6 ft 7 in (2.01 m)	228 lb (103 kg)	Sr	British Virgin Islands
G/F	22	Quinton Campbell	6 ft 7 in (2.01 m)	192 lb (87 kg)	Jr	Wilmer, AL
F	25	Jamie Champman (W)	6 ft 3 in (1.91 m)	190 lb (86 kg)	Sr	Mobile, AL

Head coach

- Doc Sadler (Auburn)

Assistant coach(es)

- Jeremy Cox (Colorado Mesa)
- Tom Schuberth (Mississippi State)
- Marques Townsend (Kansas)

Legend

- (C) Team captain
- (S) Suspended
- (I) Ineligible
- (W) Walk-on
- Injured
- Current redshirt

Roster

== Schedule ==
Date time, TV	Opponent	Result	Record	Site (attendance) city, state
Exhibition
11/05/2015*; 7:00 pm	Millsaps	W 66–38		Reed Green Coliseum; Hattiesburg, MS
Non-conference regular season
11/14/2015*; 7:00 pm, ESPN3	at Memphis	L 49–67	0–1	FedEx Forum (11,786); Memphis, TN
11/17/2015*; 7:00 pm	Jackson State	L 60–78	0–2	Reed Green Coliseum (2,933); Hattiesburg, MS
11/23/2015*; 7:00 pm	William Carey	L 78–84	0–3	Reed Green Coliseum (3,864); Hattiesburg, MS
11/28/2015*; 3:00 pm	at Morehead State	L 46–61	0–4	Ellis Johnson Arena (2,775); Morehead, KY
12/01/2015*; 7:30 pm	at Troy	L 59–69	0–5	Trojan Arena (1,633); Troy, AL
12/04/2015*; 7:00 pm, FS1	Alabama	L 55–58	0–6	Reed Green Coliseum (3,296); Hattiesburg, MS
12/06/2015*; 4:30 pm	North Dakota State	W 74–62	1–6	Reed Green Coliseum (2,972); Hattiesburg, MS
12/14/2015*; 7:00 pm	at South Alabama	W 57–54	2–6	Mitchell Center (3,146); Mobile, AL
12/19/2015*; 4:00 pm, ASN	Georgia State	L 46–66	2–7	Reed Green Coliseum (2,358); Hattiesburg, MS
12/22/2015*; 6:00 pm, ESPN3	at Tulane	L 40–59	2–8	Devlin Fieldhouse (1,541); New Orleans, LA
12/29/2015*; 7:00 pm	Southeastern Oklahoma State	W 66–52	3–8	Reed Green Coliseum (2,450); Hattiesburg, MS
Conference USA regular season
01/02/2016; 6:00 pm	at Louisiana Tech	L 57–87	3–9 (0–1)	Thomas Assembly Center (3,302); Ruston, LA
01/07/2016; 7:00 pm	Charlotte	L 76–82	3–10 (0–2)	Reed Green Coliseum (2,703); Hattiesburg, MS
01/09/2016; 7:00 pm	Old Dominion	W 73–71	4–10 (1–2)	Reed Green Coliseum (2,779); Hattiesburg, MS
01/14/2016; 6:00 pm, ASN	at Florida Atlantic	L 51–58	4–11 (1–3)	FAU Arena (1,669); Boca Raton, FL
01/16/2016; 6:00 pm	at FIU	W 66–60	5–11 (2–3)	FIU Arena (1,258); Miami, FL
01/23/2016; 7:00 pm, ASN	Louisiana Tech	L 59–70	5–12 (2–4)	Reed Green Coliseum (3,334); Hattiesburg, MS
01/28/2016; 7:00 pm	UTEP	W 71–58	6–12 (3–4)	Reed Green Coliseum (2,824); Hattiesburg, MS
01/30/2016; 7:00 pm	UTSA	W 86–60	7–12 (4–4)	Reed Green Coliseum (3,343); Hattiesburg, MS
02/04/2016; 7:00 pm	at North Texas	L 54–70	7–13 (4–5)	The Super Pit (1,607); Denton, TX
02/06/2016; 7:00 pm	at Rice	L 65–72	7–14 (4–6)	Tudor Fieldhouse (2,760); Houston, TX
02/11/2016; 7:00 pm	UAB	L 77–80 ^{2OT}	7–15 (4–7)	Reed Green Coliseum (2,895); Hattiesburg, MS
02/13/2016; 7:00 pm	Middle Tennessee	L 54–76	7–16 (4–8)	Reed Green Coliseum (2,917); Hattiesburg, MS
02/18/2016; 8:00 pm	at UTEP	L 73–78	7–17 (4–9)	Don Haskins Center (7,012); El Paso, TX
02/20/2016; 3:00 pm, ASN	at UTSA	L 53–74	7–18 (4–10)	Convocation Center (1,250); San Antonio, TX
02/25/2016; 7:00 pm	Rice	L 74–76 ^{OT}	7–19 (4–11)	Reed Green Coliseum (2,547); Hattiesburg, MS
02/27/2016; 7:00 pm	North Texas	W 81–70	8–19 (5–11)	Reed Green Coliseum (3,693); Hattiesburg, MS
03/03/2016; 8:00 pm, ASN	at WKU	L 60–75	8–20 (5–12)	E. A. Diddle Arena (3,405); Bowling Green, KY
03/05/2016; 7:00 pm	at Marshall	L 106–108 ^{OT}	8–21 (5–13)	Cam Henderson Center (6,431); Huntington, WV
*Non-conference game. ^{#}Rankings from AP Poll. (#) Tournament seedings in parentheses. All times are in Central Time.
