= 2015–16 Georgia Southern Eagles men's basketball team =

American college basketball season

2015–16 Georgia Southern Eagles men's basketball
- Conference: Sun Belt Conference
- Record: 14–17 (10–10 Sun Belt)
- Head coach: Mark Byington (3rd season)
- Assistant coaches: Larry Dixon; Andrew Wilson; Ben Betts
- Home arena: Hanner Fieldhouse

2015–16 Sun Belt Conference men's basketball standings
	Conf.				Overall
Team	W		L	PCT	W		L	PCT
Little Rock †	17	–	3	.850	30	–	5	.857
Louisiana–Monroe	15	–	5	.750	20	–	14	.588
Texas–Arlington	13	–	7	.650	24	–	11	.686
Louisiana–Lafayette	12	–	8	.600	19	–	15	.559
Georgia Southern	10	–	10	.500	14	–	17	.452
Georgia State	9	–	11	.450	16	–	14	.533
Texas State	8	–	12	.400	15	–	16	.484
South Alabama	8	–	12	.400	14	–	19	.424
Arkansas State	7	–	13	.350	11	–	20	.355
Appalachian State	7	–	13	.350	9	–	22	.290
Troy	4	–	16	.200	9	–	22	.290
† 2016 Sun Belt Conference tournament winner

The 2015–16 Georgia Southern Eagles men's basketball team represented Georgia Southern University during the 2015–16 NCAA Division I men's basketball season. The Eagles, led by third year head coach Mark Byington, played their home games at Hanner Fieldhouse and were members of the Sun Belt Conference. They finished the season 14–17, 10–10 in Sun Belt play to finish in fifth place. They lost in the first round of the Sun Belt tournament to South Alabama.

== Roster ==
Number	Name	Position	Height	Weight	Year	Hometown
0	Montae Glenn	Forward	6–8	250	Freshman	Carrollton, Georgia
1	Devonte Boykins	Guard	6–2	180	Sophomore	Forest City, North Carolina
2	Mike Hughes	Guard	6–3	190	Sophomore	Winston-Salem, North Carolina
3	Ike Smith	Guard	6–4	195	Freshman	Gainesville, Florida
4	Tookie Brown	Guard	5–11	180	Freshman	Madison, Georgia
5	Devince Boykins	Guard	6–4	210	RS–Senior	Forest City, North Carolina
10	Jake Allsmiller	Guard	6–5	185	Sophomore	Nashville, Tennessee
11	Shawn O'Connell	Forward	6–8	210	RS–Freshman	Roswell, Georgia
12	Aubrey McRae	Guard	6–3	185	RS–Freshman	Augusta, Georgia
13	Jason Burnell	Forward	6–7	220	Freshman	DeLand, Florida
14	Coye Simmons	Forward	6–8	240	Sophomore	Winston-Salem, North Carolina
21	James Holder	Guard	6–1	175	Junior	Gwinnett, Georgia
23	Jonathan Sanks	Guard	6–4	180	RS– Freshman	Warner Robins, Georgia
24	Brandon Wimberley	Guard	6–1	170	Sophomore	Macon, Georgia
	Dominique Bullock	Guard	5–11	183	Junior	Valdosta, Georgia
	Khalil Carson	Forward	6–4	250	Junior	Albany, Georgia
	D.J. Suter	Guard	6–4	200	Senior	Alpharetta, Georgia

== Schedule ==
Date time, TV	Opponent	Result	Record	Site (attendance) city, state
Exhibition
11/05/2015*; 7:00 pm	Middle Georgia State	W 87–73		Hanner Fieldhouse (1,553); Statesboro, GA
Regular season
11/13/2015*; 7:30 pm	Webber International	W 116–49	1–0	Hanner Fieldhouse (2,380); Statesboro, GA
11/16/2015*; 8:00 pm, SECN+	at Ole Miss	L 72–82	1–1	Tad Smith Coliseum (5,499); Oxford, MS
11/20/2015*; 9:30 pm, SECN+	at Auburn	L 62–92	1–2	Auburn Arena (7,806); Auburn, AL
11/25/2015*; 7:00 pm	vs. The Citadel; Upstate Challenge	L 90–95	1–3	G. B. Hodge Center (420); Spartanburg, SC
11/27/2015*; 5:00 pm, ESPN3	at USC Upstate; Upstate Challenge	W 84–80	2–3	G. B. Hodge Center (567); Spartanburg, SC
11/30/2015*; 7:00 pm	Bob Jones; Upstate Challenge	W 104–52	3–3	Hanner Fieldhouse (1,025); Statesboro, GA
12/02/2015*; 8:00 pm	at Savannah State	L 67–76	3–4	Tiger Arena (4,523); Savannah, GA
12/15/2015*; 7:00 pm, ESPN2	at No. 7 Duke	L 65–99	3–5	Cameron Indoor Stadium (9,314); Durham, NC
12/19/2015*; 4:00 pm	Winthrop	L 81–88	3–6	Hanner Fieldhouse (807); Statesboro, GA
12/22/2015*; 7:00 pm	Stetson	W 78–58	4–6	Hanner Fieldhouse (501); Statesboro, GA
12/30/2015; 8:30 pm	at Texas State	L 66–80	4–7 (0–1)	Strahan Coliseum (1,822); San Marcos, TX
01/02/2016; 8:15 pm	at UT Arlington	L 72–92	4–8 (0–2)	College Park Center (2,117); Arlington, TX
01/07/2016; 7:30 pm	South Alabama	L 58–64	4–9 (0–3)	Hanner Fieldhouse (1,003); Statesboro, GA
01/09/2016; 5:00 pm	Troy	W 93–88 ^{OT}	5–9 (1–3)	Hanner Fieldhouse (1,155); Statesboro, GA
01/14/2016; 7:30 pm, ESPN3	Louisiana–Lafayette	L 65–74	5–10 (1–4)	Hanner Fieldhouse (2,023); Statesboro, GA
01/16/2016; 5:00 pm, ESPN3	Louisiana–Monroe	W 66–51	6–10 (2–4)	Hanner Fieldhouse (1,206); Statesboro, GA
01/19/2016; 7:30 pm, ESPN3	at Georgia State	L 66–69 ^{OT}	6–11 (2–5)	GSU Sports Arena (3,854); Atlanta, GA
01/25/2016; 6:30 pm, ESPN3	at Appalachian State; Postponed from 1/23	W 101–100	7–11 (3–5)	Holmes Center (1,080); Boone, NC
01/28/2016; 8:15 pm	at Arkansas–Little Rock	L 67–80	7–12 (3–6)	Jack Stephens Center (3,078); Little Rock, AR
01/30/2016; 8:00 pm, ESPN3	at Arkansas State	W 71–66	8–12 (4–6)	Convocation Center (1,572); Jonesboro, AR
02/04/2016; 7:30 pm	UT Arlington	W 82–73	9–12 (5–6)	Hanner Fieldhouse (1,668); Statesboro, GA
02/06/2016; 7:00 pm	Texas State	W 66–62	10–12 (6–6)	Hanner Fieldhouse (2,213); Statesboro, GA
02/11/2016; 8:30 pm	at Troy	W 77–71	11–12 (7–6)	Trojan Arena (1,326); Troy, AL
02/13/2016; 5:00 pm, ESPN3	at South Alabama	L 76–80	11–13 (7–7)	Mitchell Center (2,296); Mobile, AL
02/18/2016; 7:30 pm	Arkansas State	W 90–59	12–13 (8–7)	Hanner Fieldhouse (1,849); Statesboro, GA
02/20/2016; 7:00 pm	Arkansas–Little Rock	L 61–75	12–14 (8–8)	Hanner Fieldhouse (1,702); Statesboro, GA
02/23/2016; 7:30 pm, ESPN2	Georgia State	W 54–52	13–14 (9–8)	Hanner Fieldhouse (4,046); Statesboro, GA
02/25/2016; 7:30 pm, ESPN3	Appalachian State	W 88–63	14–14 (10–8)	Hanner Fieldhouse (2,129); Statesboro, GA
03/03/2016; 8:00 pm	at Louisiana–Monroe	L 76–83	14–15 (10–9)	Fant–Ewing Coliseum (3,483); Monroe, LA
03/05/2016; 8:15 pm	at Louisiana–Lafayette	L 78–87	14–16 (10–10)	Cajundome (4,474); Lafayette, LA
Sun Belt tournament
03/10/2016; 5:00 pm, ESPN3	vs. South Alabama; First round	L 61–67	14–17	Lakefront Arena (703); New Orleans, LA
*Non-conference game. ^{#}Rankings from AP Poll. (#) Tournament seedings in parentheses. All times are in Eastern Time.
