= 2015–16 Old Dominion Monarchs men's basketball team =

American college basketball season

2015–16 Old Dominion Monarchs men's basketball

Vegas 16 champions
- Conference: Conference USA
- Record: 25–13 (12–6 C-USA)
- Head coach: Jeff Jones (3rd season)
- Assistant coaches: Lamar Barrett (3rd season); John Richardson (4th season); Bryant Stith (3rd season)
- Captains: Trey Freeman; Aaron Bacote; Denzell Taylor
- Home arena: Ted Constant Convocation Center

2015–16 Conference USA men's basketball standings
	Conf.				Overall
Team	W		L	PCT	W		L	PCT
UAB	16	–	2	.889	26	–	7	.788
Middle Tennessee †	13	–	5	.722	25	–	10	.714
Marshall	12	–	6	.667	17	–	16	.515
Louisiana Tech	12	–	6	.667	23	–	10	.697
Old Dominion	12	–	6	.667	25	–	13	.658
UTEP	10	–	8	.556	19	–	14	.576
Charlotte	9	–	9	.500	14	–	19	.424
Western Kentucky	8	–	10	.444	18	–	16	.529
North Texas	7	–	11	.389	12	–	20	.375
Rice	7	–	11	.389	12	–	20	.375
FIU	7	–	11	.389	13	–	19	.406
Florida Atlantic	5	–	13	.278	8	–	25	.242
Southern Miss*	5	–	13	.278	8	–	21	.276
UTSA	3	–	15	.167	5	–	27	.156
† 2016 C-USA Tournament winner *Ineligible for postseason play due to self-imposed postseason ban.

The 2015–16 Old Dominion Monarchs men’s basketball team represented Old Dominion University during the 2015–16 NCAA Division I men's basketball season. The Monarchs, led by third year head coach Jeff Jones, played their home games at the Ted Constant Convocation Center as members of Conference USA. They finished the season 25–13, 12–6 in C-USA play to finish in a three way tie for third place. They defeated Florida Atlantic, Louisiana Tech, and WKU to advance to the championship game of the C-USA tournament where they lost to Middle Tennessee. The received an invitation to the inaugural Vegas 16, which only had eight teams, where they defeated Tennessee Tech, UC Santa Barbara, and Oakland to become Vegas 16 champions.

== Previous season ==
The Monarchs finished the 2013–14 season 27–8, 13–5 in C-USA play to finish in a tie for second place, after reaching as high as 13–1 to start the season, and being ranked in the AP Top 25 for the first time in program history. They lost in the quarterfinals of the C-USA tournament to Middle Tennessee. They were invited to the National Invitation Tournament where they defeated Charleston Southern in the first round, Illinois State in the second round, and Murray State in the quarterfinals to advance to the semifinals where they lost to Stanford.

== Pre-season ==
=== Departures ===
Name	Number	Pos.	Height	Weight	Year	Hometown	Notes
Keenan Palmore	3	G	6'1"	185	Junior	Stone Mountain, Georgia	Graduated & transferred to Lenoir–Rhyne
Javonte Douglas	10	F	6'7"	200	Junior	Charlotte, North Carolina	Graduated & transferred to Montevallo
Josue Ebondo	11	F	6'7"	221	Senior	Euless, Texas	Graduated
Deion Clark	15	G	6'3"	210	RS Sophomore	Naples, Florida	Transferred to Rollins College
Richard Ross	23	F	6'6"	225	RS Senior	Wichita Falls, Texas	Graduated
Jonathan Arledge	35	F/C	6'9"	235	Senior	Silver Springs, Maryland	Graduated

=== Incoming transfers ===
Name	Number	Pos.	Height	Weight	Year	Hometown	Previous School
B. J. Stith	3	G/F	6'5"	205	Sophomore	Lawrenceville, Virginia	Transferred from Virginia. Under NCAA transfer rules, Stith will have to redshirt for the 2015–16 season. Will have three years of remaining eligibility.
Austin Colbert	11	F	6'9"	200	Junior	Chesapeake, Virginia	Transferred from Illinois. Under NCAA transfer rules, Colbert will have to sit out for the 2015–16 season. Will have two years of remaining eligibility.
Payton Pervier	12	C	7'1"	250	RS Senior	Snohomish, Washington	Junior college transferred from Dodge City Community College
Trey Porter	15	F	6'10"	200	Sophomore	Dumfries, Virginia	Transferred from George Mason. Under NCAA transfer rules, Porter will have to sit out for the 2015–16 season. Will have three years of remaining eligibility.

=== 2015 recruiting class ===
College recruiting
Name	Hometown	School	Height	Weight	Commit date
Ahmad Caver; PG	Atlanta, Georgia	St. John's NW Military Academy	6 ft 1 in (1.85 m)	180 lb (82 kg)	Oct 7, 2014
Ahmad Caver; PG	Recruit ratings: Scout: Rivals: (NR)				
Aaron Carver; PF	Elizabeth City, North Carolina	South Kent School	6 ft 7 in (2.01 m)	215 lb (98 kg)	Aug 13, 2013
Aaron Carver; PF	Recruit ratings: Scout: Rivals: (NR)				
Overall recruit ranking:
Note: In many cases, Scout, Rivals, 247Sports, On3, and ESPN may conflict in their listings of height and weight.; In these cases, the average was taken. ESPN grades are on a 100-point scale.; Sources: "2015 Team Ranking". Rivals.

== Roster ==
2015–16 Old Dominion Monarchs men's basketball team
Players
Coaches

Pos.	#	Name	Height	Weight	Year	Previous school	Hometown
G	0	Jordan Baker	6 ft 2 in (1.88 m)	205 lb (93 kg)	Jr	Hampton HS	Hampton, Virginia
G	1	Aaron Bacote (C)	6 ft 4 in (1.93 m)	190 lb (86 kg)	Sr	Bethel HS	Hampton, Virginia
G	2	Martin Shaw (W)	6 ft 0 in (1.83 m)	170 lb (77 kg)	Sr	Kecoughtan HS	Hampton, Virginia
G	3	B. J. Stith (I) (redshirt)	6 ft 5 in (1.96 m)	210 lb (95 kg)	So	Oak Hill Academy; Virginia	Lawrenceville, Virginia
G	4	Ahmad Caver	6 ft 2 in (1.88 m)	170 lb (77 kg)	Fr	St Johns Northwestern Military	Atlanta
F	11	Austin Colbert (I) (redshirt)	6 ft 8 in (2.03 m)	195 lb (88 kg)	Jr	Gill St. Bernard's School; Illinois	Chesapeake, Virginia
C	12	Payton Pervier	7 ft 1 in (2.16 m)	275 lb (125 kg)	RS Sr	Glacier Peak HS; Dodge City CC	Snohomish, Washington
F	13	Aaron Carver	6 ft 7 in (2.01 m)	210 lb (95 kg)	Fr	South Kent School	Elizabeth City, North Carolina
F	15	Trey Porter (I) (redshirt)	6 ft 10 in (2.08 m)	205 lb (93 kg)	So	Potomac HS; George Mason	Woodbridge, Virginia
G	20	Trey Freeman (C)	6 ft 2 in (1.88 m)	180 lb (82 kg)	RS Sr	Kellam HS; Campbell	Virginia Beach, Virginia
F	21	Denzell Taylor (C)	6 ft 7 in (2.01 m)	220 lb (100 kg)	Jr	St. Benedict's Prep	Brampton, ON
G	22	Ambrose Mosley	6 ft 2 in (1.88 m)	185 lb (84 kg)	RS Jr	Hargrave Military Academy	Jacksonville, Florida
F	23	Stephen Vassor (W)	6 ft 7 in (2.01 m)	240 lb (109 kg)	RS So	Brunswick HS; Hampden–Sydney College	Lawrenceville, Virginia
F	24	Zoran Talley	6 ft 7 in (2.01 m)	200 lb (91 kg)	RS Fr	Merrillville HS	Merrillville, Indiana
F	25	Brandan Stith	6 ft 7 in (2.01 m)	240 lb (109 kg)	RS So	Brunswick HS; East Carolina	Lawrenceville, Virginia
F	30	Nik Biberaj (W)	6 ft 8 in (2.03 m)	245 lb (111 kg)	RS Sr	South County HS; Christopher Newport	Fairfax Station, Virginia

Head coach

- Jeff Jones (Virginia)

Assistant coach(es)

- Lamar Barrett (Elizabeth City State)
- John Richardson (Elizabeth City State)
- Bryant Stith (Virginia)

Legend

- (C) Team captain
- (S) Suspended
- (I) Ineligible
- (W) Walk-on
- Injured
- Current redshirt

Roster

== Schedule ==
Date time, TV	Rank^{#}	Opponent^{#}	Result	Record	High points	High rebounds	High assists	Site (attendance) city, state
Exhibition
November 5*; 7:00 pm		Christopher Newport	W 85–43		15 – Caver	7 – 2 tied	4 – 2 tied	Ted Constant Convocation Center (6,426); Norfolk, Virginia
Non-conference regular season
November 13*; 7:00 pm		Niagara; Hall of Fame Tip Off	W 67–50	1–0	20 – Freeman (1)	9 – Taylor (1)	4 – Taylor (1)	Ted Constant Convocation Center (8,150); Norfolk, Virginia
November 16*; 7:00 pm		Buffalo; Hall of Fame Tip Off	W 77–58	2–0	22 – Freeman (2)	9 – Stith (1)	5 – Biberaj (1)	Ted Constant Convocation Center (6,906); Norfolk, Virginia
November 18*; 7:00 pm		Morgan State	W 79–48	3–0	22 – Bacote (1)	10 – Taylor (2)	3 – 3 tied	Ted Constant Convocation Center (6,968); Norfolk, Virginia
November 21*; 12:00 pm, ESPN3		vs. No. 21 Purdue; Hall of Fame Tip Off semifinals	L 39–61	3–1	17 – Freeman (3)	7 – Baker (1)	2 – 2 tied	Mohegan Sun Arena (3,813); Uncasville, Connecticut
November 22*; 12:00 pm, ESPN3		vs. Saint Joseph's; Hall of Fame Tip Off	L 64–66	3–2	15 – Freeman (4)	10 – Biberaj (1)	2 – 4 tied	Mohegan Sun Arena (3,813); Uncasville, Connecticut
November 28*; 4:00 pm, CSN		at VCU; Rivalry	L 67–76	3–3	21 – Bacote (2)	6 – Mosley (1)	6 – Freeman (2)	Siegel Center (7,637); Richmond, Virginia
December 1*; 7:00 pm		at William & Mary; Rivalry	L 48–55	3–4	14 – 2 tied	8 – Talley (1)	3 – Bacote (3)	Kaplan Arena (3,256); Williamsburg, Virginia
December 4*; 7:00 pm		Delaware State	W 82–38	4–4	18 – Bacote (4)	18 – Taylor (3)	4 – Freeman (3)	Ted Constant Convocation Center (6,764); Norfolk, Virginia
December 12*; 2:00 pm, ESPN3		at Georgia State	L 64–68	4–5	16 – 2 tied	5 – 3 tied	4 – Freeman (4)	GSU Sports Arena (1,741); Atlanta
December 16*; 7:00 pm, ASN		at Richmond	L 61–77	4–6	15 – Freeman (7)	10 – Taylor (4)	3 – Talley (1)	Robins Center (5,533); Richmond, Virginia
December 18*; 8:00 pm, ASN		Maryland Eastern Shore	W 77–74	5–6	21 – Freeman (8)	8 – Stith (2)	7 – Freeman (5)	Ted Constant Convocation Center (5,825); Norfolk, Virginia
December 22*; 7:00 pm, ASN		Rhode Island	W 71–65	6–6	30 – Bacote (5)	10 – Taylor (5)	5 – Freeman (6)	Ted Constant Convocation Center (6,298); Norfolk, Virginia
December 29*; 7:00 pm		Norfolk State; Rivalry	W 68–57	7–6	20 – Bacote (6)	13 – Stith (3)	4 – Freeman (7)	Ted Constant Convocation Center (8,472); Norfolk, Virginia
Conference USA regular season
January 2; 12:00 pm, ASN		Charlotte	W 74–65	8–6 (1–0)	21 – Freeman (9)	13 – Taylor (6)	4 – Bacote (4)	Ted Constant Convocation Center (6,733); Norfolk, Virginia
January 7; 9:30 pm, CBSSN		at Louisiana Tech	W 56–53	9–6 (2–0)	21 – Freeman (10)	8 – Stith (4)	3 – 2 tied	Thomas Assembly Center (4,807); Ruston, Louisiana
January 9; 8:00 pm		at Southern Miss	L 71–73	9–7 (2–1)	24 – Freeman (11)	12 – Stith (5)	6 – 2 tied	Reed Green Coliseum (2,779); Hattiesburg, Mississippi
January 14; 7:00 pm, CBSSN		UAB	L 71–72 ^{OT}	9–8 (2–2)	28 – Freeman (12)	13 – Stith (6)	6 – Caver (3)	Ted Constant Convocation Center (7,162); Norfolk, Virginia
January 16; 4:00 pm, FSN		Middle Tennessee	L 61–64	9–9 (2–3)	28 – Freeman (13)	9 – Talley (3)	4 – Bacote (5)	Ted Constant Convocation Center (7,067); Norfolk, Virginia
January 21; 7:00 pm, ASN		WKU	W 68–62	10–9 (3–3)	28 – Freeman (14)	9 – Stith (7)	4 – Bacote (6)	Ted Constant Convocation Center (6,535); Norfolk, Virginia
January 23; 2:00 pm, ASN		Marshall	L 75–78	10–10 (3–4)	37 – Freeman (15)	13 – Taylor (7)	7 – Baker (5)	Ted Constant Convocation Center (7,140); Norfolk, Virginia
January 28; 7:00 pm		at Florida Atlantic	W 78–66	11–10 (4–4)	28 – Freeman (16)	13 – Stith (8)	3 – 2 tied	FAU Arena (1,517); Boca Raton, Florida
January 30; 7:00 pm		at FIU	W 64–60	12–10 (5–4)	25 – Freeman (17)	11 – Taylor (8)	4 – Talley (4)	FIU Arena (1,209); Miami
February 6; 7:00 pm		at Charlotte	W 74–69 ^{OT}	13–10 (6–4)	38 – Freeman (18)	10 – Stith (9)	4 – Biberaj (3)	Dale F. Halton Arena (4,646); Charlotte, North Carolina
February 11; 7:00 pm, ASN		North Texas	W 67–47	14–10 (7–4)	17 – Stith (1)	11 – Stith (10)	3 – 2 tied	Ted Constant Convocation Center (6,250); Norfolk, Virginia
February 13; 2:00 pm, ASN		Rice	L 66–75	14–11 (7–5)	27 – Freeman (19)	16 – Stith (11)	4 – Baker (6)	Ted Constant Convocation Center (7,075); Norfolk, Virginia
February 18; 8:00 pm, FCS		at WKU	W 59–56	15–11 (8–5)	26 – Freeman (20)	13 – Stith (12)	4 – Freeman (12)	E. A. Diddle Arena (3,182); Bowling Green, Kentucky
February 20; 7:00 pm		at Marshall	L 65–82	15–12 (8–6)	20 – Freeman (21)	8 – Baker (2)	3 – Freeman (13)	Cam Henderson Center (8,520); Huntington, West Virginia
February 25; 7:00 pm, FSN		UTEP	W 74–53	16–12 (9–6)	16 – 2 tied	15 – Stith (13)	4 – 2 tied	Ted Constant Convocation Center (6,887); Norfolk, Virginia
February 27; 7:00 pm		UTSA	W 78–56	17–12 (10–6)	21 – 2 tied	14 – Stith (14)	6 – Freeman (15)	Ted Constant Convocation Center (8,372); Norfolk, Virginia
March 3; 8:00 pm		at North Texas	W 76–70	18–12 (11–6)	24 – Freeman (23)	8 – Stith (15)	5 – 2 tied	The Super Pit (1,878); Denton, Texas
March 5; 2:00 pm, ASN		at Rice	W 74–67	19–12 (12–6)	33 – Freeman (24)	12 – Taylor (9)	5 – Baker (7)	Tudor Fieldhouse (3,418); Houston, Texas
Conference USA tournament
March 9; 3:30 pm, ASN	(5)	vs. (12) Florida Atlantic; Second round	W 72–46	20–12	25 – Freeman (25)	10 – Taylor (11)	4 – Freeman (17)	Legacy Arena (3,888); Birmingham, Alabama
March 10; 3:30 pm, ASN	(5)	vs. (4) Louisiana Tech; Quarterfinals	W 68–52	21–12	25 – Freeman (26)	10 – Taylor (11)	4 – Freeman (17)	Legacy Arena (9,797); Birmingham, Alabama
March 11; 4:00 pm, CBSSN	(5)	vs. (8) WKU; Semifinals	W 89–77	22–12	42 – Freeman (27)	13 – Stith (16)	5 – Baker (8)	Legacy Arena (6,176); Birmingham, Alabama
March 12; 2:30 pm, FS1	(5)	vs. (2) Middle Tennessee; Championship game	L 53–55	22–13	17 – Freeman (28)	12 – Stith (17)	2 – Taylor (2)	Legacy Arena (5,519); Birmingham, Alabama
Vegas 16
March 28*; 3:00 pm, CBSSN		vs. Tennessee Tech; Quarterfinals	W 75–59	23–13	18 – Freeman (29)	7 – 2 tied	3 – 3 tied	Mandalay Bay Events Center; Paradise, Nevada
March 29*; 9:00 pm, CBSSN		vs. UC Santa Barbara; Semifinals	W 64–49	24–13	26 – Bacote (7)	10 – Freeman (2)	4 – Caver (4)	Mandalay Bay Events Center; Paradise, Nevada
March 30*; 10:00 pm, CBSSN		vs. Oakland; Championship game	W 68–67	25–13	24 – Freeman (30)	15 – Stith (19)	5 – Taylor (3)	Mandalay Bay Events Center; Paradise, Nevada
*Non-conference game. ^{#}Rankings from AP Poll. (#) Tournament seedings in parentheses. All times are in Eastern Time.
