= Ahmad Caver =

American basketball player (born 1996)

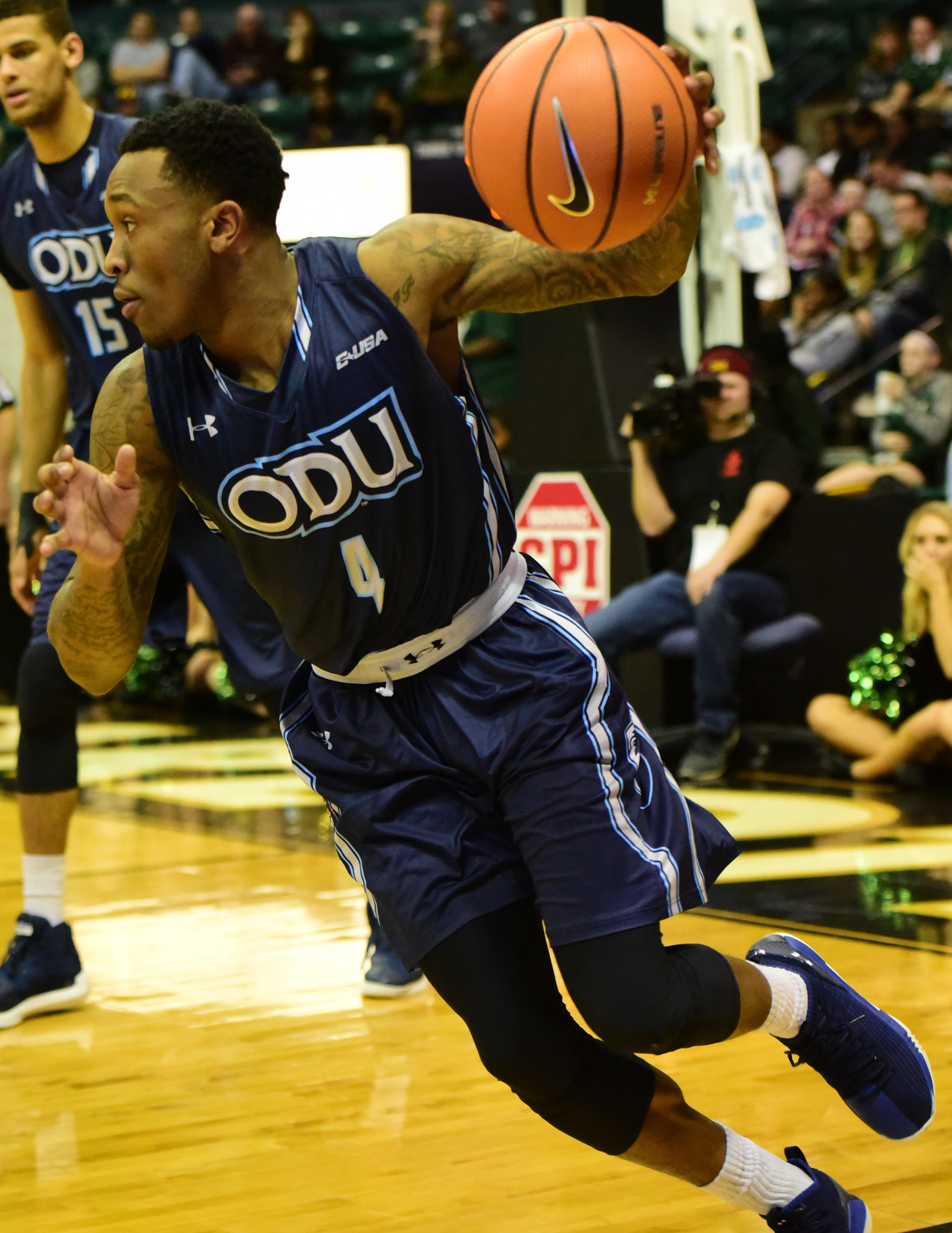
- Caver with Old Dominion in 2018

No. 7 – Maccabi Ramat Gan
- Position: Point guard
- League: Israeli Basketball Premier League

Personal information
- Born: September 12, 1996 (age 30) Buffalo, New York, U.S.
- Listed height: 6 ft 2 in (1.88 m)
- Listed weight: 175 lb (79 kg)

Career information
- High school: Charles Drew (Atlanta, Georgia); North Gwinnett (Suwanee, Georgia); St. John's Northwestern Military Academy (Delafield, Wisconsin)
- College: Old Dominion (2015–2019)
- NBA draft: 2019: undrafted
- Playing career: 2019–present

Career history
- 2019–2021: Memphis Hustle
- 2021–2022: Indiana Pacers
- 2022: Memphis Hustle
- 2022–2023: BC Wolves
- 2023–2024: JDA Dijon
- 2024–2025: Nanterre 92
- 2025–2026: Mexico City Capitanes
- 2026–present: Maccabi Ramat Gan

Career highlights
- LKL MVP (2023); LKL Top Scorer (2023); All-LKL Team (2023); 2× First-team All-Conference USA (2018, 2019); Third-team All-Conference USA (2017); Conference USA All-Defensive Team (2018)
- Stats at NBA.com
- Stats at Basketball Reference

Ahmad Caver (born September 12, 1996) is an American professional basketball player for Maccabi Ramat Gan of the Israeli Basketball Premier League. He played college basketball for the Old Dominion Monarchs, and appeared in one NBA game for the Indiana Pacers.

== High school career ==
Caver is the son of Wilton Caver. He attended Charles Drew High School in Atlanta, Georgia as a freshman before transferring to North Gwinnett High School in Suwanee, Georgia. The move was made to become closer to his AAU coach Jerry Stackhouse, who became his legal guardian. Caver spent his first season at North Gwinnett on the junior varsity team and grew to 5'10". After graduating from North Gwinnett, he did a postgraduate year at St. John's Northwestern Military Academy, an experience he initially hated but his parents encouraged. He was lightly recruited, picking up an offer from Kent State before committing to Old Dominion.

== College career ==
Caver was a backup to Trey Freeman as a freshman, averaging 2.7 points per game and was named to the academic honor roll. Caver scored a season-high 26 points versus Marshall on January 5, 2017. As a sophomore, Caver led Old Dominion in scoring and assists with 13 points and 4.8 assists per game, to go with 3.5 rebounds per contest. He was named to the Third Team All-Conference USA and team MVP. He had a career-high 30 points on December 17, 2017, in an 82–77 overtime win over Fairfield. Caver averaged 14.2 points and 6.2 assists per game as a junior, leading the Monarchs to a 25–7 record and second place in conference. He was named to the First Team All-Conference USA and the league Defensive Team. Coming into his senior season, he was named to the Bob Cousy Award watchlist. As a senior, Caver averaged 16.6 points, 5.5 assists and 4.3 rebounds per game. Alongside B. J. Stith, he helped lead Old Dominion to a Conference USA regular season championship and NCAA Tournament appearance. Caver was named to the First Team All-Conference USA. He finished his college career ranked eighth in conference history in assists (607) and 15th in steals (187).

== Professional career ==
=== Memphis Hustle (2019–2021) ===
Caver signed with sports agent DeAngelo Simmons in preparation for the 2019 NBA draft but went undrafted. He signed an Exhibit 10 deal with the Memphis Grizzlies on October 15, 2019. On October 16, he was cut by the Grizzlies and joined the Memphis Hustle. Caver contributed 23 points and four assists in a 120–112 loss to the Sioux Falls Skyforce on March 7, 2020. He averaged 9.9 points, 4 assists and 3.3 rebounds per game for the Hustle.

On December 11, 2020, Caver signed with the Memphis Grizzlies. He was waived at the end of training camp and returned to the Hustle. During the 2020–21 season, Caver averaged 16.5 points, 4.1 rebounds, 3.8 assists and 1.9 steals per game.

On October 14, 2021, Caver again signed with the Grizzlies, but was waived three days later, prior to the start of the season. On October 23, he re-signed with the Hustle. Caver averaged 15.4 points, 7.0 assists and 4.5 rebounds per game.

=== Indiana Pacers (2021–2022) ===
On December 31, 2021, Caver signed a 10-day contract with the Indiana Pacers via the hardship exemption. He made his NBA debut on January 5, 2022, scoring two points in a 129–121 loss against the Brooklyn Nets.

=== Return to the Memphis Hustle (2022) ===
On January 10, 2022, Caver was reacquired and activated by the Memphis Hustle. In 43 games played (41 starts), he averaged 16.3 points, 5.3 rebounds, 7.5 assists and 1.7 steals per game.

Caver joined the Phoenix Suns for the 2022 NBA Summer League.

=== BC Wolves (2022–2023) ===
On August 6, Caver signed with BC Wolves of the Lithuanian Basketball League (LKL). On May 10, 2023, Caver received the LKL Most Valuable Player (MVP) award after averaging 16.9 points, 3.3 rebounds, 5.8 assists and 1.9 steals in 31 regular season games played, leading the league in points and efficiency.

On July 20, 2023, Caver signed with Hapoel Holon of the Israeli Basketball Premier League. On October 28, 2023, he left the club over concerns about the security situation in Israel, without appearing in a game for Hapoel Holon.

=== JDA Dijon (2023–2024) ===
On November 1, 2023, Caver signed with JDA Dijon Basket of the LNB Pro A.

=== Nanterre 92 (2024–2025) ===
On September 13, 2024, he signed with Nanterre 92 of the LNB Pro A.

== Career statistics ==
Legend
| GP | Games played | GS | Games started | MPG | Minutes per game |
| FG% | Field goal percentage | 3P% | 3-point field goal percentage | FT% | Free throw percentage |
| RPG | Rebounds per game | APG | Assists per game | SPG | Steals per game |
| BPG | Blocks per game | PPG | Points per game | **Bold** | Career high |

=== NBA ===
| Year | Team | GP | GS | MPG | FG% | 3P% | FT% | RPG | APG | SPG | BPG | PPG |
|---|---|---|---|---|---|---|---|---|---|---|---|---|
| 2021–22 | Indiana | 1 | 0 | 1.0 | 1.000 | — | — | .0 | .0 | .0 | .0 | 2.0 |
| Career | | 1 | 0 | 1.0 | 1.000 | — | — | .0 | .0 | .0 | .0 | 2.0 |

=== College ===
| Year | Team | GP | GS | MPG | FG% | 3P% | FT% | RPG | APG | SPG | BPG | PPG |
|---|---|---|---|---|---|---|---|---|---|---|---|---|
| 2015–16 | Old Dominion | **38** | 0 | 15.4 | .310 | .271 | .500 | 1.8 | 1.8 | .6 | **.3** | 2.7 |
| 2016–17 | Old Dominion | 31 | 29 | 35.3 | .360 | **.368** | .628 | 3.5 | 4.8 | 1.3 | .2 | 13.0 |
| 2017–18 | Old Dominion | 32 | 29 | 37.2 | **.408** | .349 | .667 | 3.5 | **6.2** | **2.3** | .2 | 14.2 |
| 2018–19 | Old Dominion | 35 | **35** | **37.6** | .381 | .303 | **.692** | **4.3** | 5.5 | 1.4 | **.3** | **16.6** |
| Career | | 136 | 93 | 30.8 | .377 | .332 | .652 | 3.2 | 4.5 | 1.4 | .2 | 11.3 |
