= Steve Logan =

Steve Logan may refer to:

- Steve Logan (basketball) – American basketball player (born 1980)
- Steve Logan (American football) – American football coach (born 1953)
