= Eurocup Basketball 2013–14 Last 32 Group J =

Standings and Results for Group J of the Last 32 phase of the 2013–14 Eurocup basketball tournament.

== Standings ==
	Team	Pld	W	L	PF	PA	Diff	Tie-break
1.	(Turkey) Aykon TED Ankara	6	4	2	489	484	+5	
2.	(Italy) Banco di Sardegna Sassari	6	3	3	526	517	+9	1–1 (+7)
3.	(Germany) Brose Baskets	6	3	3	475	475	0	1–1 (–7)
4.	(France) BCM Gravelines	6	2	4	459	473	–14	

== Fixtures and results ==
=== Game 1 ===
8 January 2014
20:00 CET

Boxscore

BCM Gravelines (France)	67–86	(Germany) Brose Baskets
Scoring by quarter: 16–21, 15–27, 19–19, 17–19
Pts: Gray 18; Rebs: Camara 12; Asts: Rousselle 3		Pts: Fischer 20; Rebs: Gavel 6 Asts: Wright 9

Sportica, Gravelines
Attendance: 2,500
Referees: Jose Ramon Garcia Ortiz (ESP), Carmelo Paternico (ITA), Carlos Cortes (ESP)

8 January 2014
20:30 CET

Boxscore

Banco di Sardegna Sassari (Italy)	103–67	(Turkey) Aykon TED Ankara
Scoring by quarter: 29–14, 23–20, 32–13, 19–20
Pts: C. Green 25; Rebs: Johnson 10; Asts: M. Green 10		Pts: Golubović 27; Rebs: Golubović 6 Asts: Tucker 4

Palasport Roberta Serradimigni, Sassari
Attendance: 2,860
Referees: Jakub Zamojski (POL), Petar Obradovic (BIH), Petros Papapetrou (GRE)

=== Game 2 ===
15 January 2014
18:00 CET

Boxscore

Aykon TED Ankara (Turkey)	71–68	(France) BCM Gravelines
Scoring by quarter: 21–19, 14–20, 19–12, 17–17
Pts: Golubović 17; Rebs: Golubović 12; Asts: Valters 9		Pts: Lewis 17; Rebs: Lewis 8 Asts: Bokolo 4

Ankara Arena, Ankara
Attendance: 250
Referees: Roberto Chiari (ITA), Gentian Cici (ALB), Saso Petek (SLO)

15 January 2014
20:00 CET

Boxscore

Brose Baskets (Germany)	83–72	(Italy) Banco di Sardegna Sassari
Scoring by quarter: 20–12, 27–22, 12–19, 24–19
Pts: Gavel 21; Rebs: Zirbes 9 Asts: Goldsberry 8		Pts: Gordon 19; Rebs: Gordon 14; Asts: Green 10

Stechert Arena, Bamberg
Attendance: 6,800
Referees: Antonio Conde (ESP), Eddie Viator (FRA), Igor Dragojevic (MNE)

=== Game 3 ===
22 January 2014
18:00 CET

Boxscore

Aykon TED Ankara (Turkey)	81–68	(Germany) Brose Baskets
Scoring by quarter: 27–20, 14–17, 22–9, 18–22
Pts: Plisnić 23; Rebs: Golubović 13; Asts: Valters 7		Pts: Gavel 12; Rebs: Fischer 7 Asts: Gavel 6

Ankara Arena, Ankara
Attendance: 500
Referees: Srdan Dozai (CRO), Gianluca Mattioli (ITA), Tomasz Trawicki (POL)

22 January 2014
20:30 CET

Boxscore

Banco di Sardegna Sassari (Italy)	79–85	(France) BCM Gravelines
Scoring by quarter: 20–20, 19–24, 20–13, 20–28
Pts: C. Green 25; Rebs: Gordon 9 Asts: M. Green 6		Pts: Gray 28; Rebs: Lewis 9 Asts: Holland 5

Palasport Roberta Serradimigni, Sassari
Attendance: 3,069
Referees: Matej Boltauzer (SLO), Miguel Angel Perez Niz (ESP), Josip Radojkovic (CRO)

=== Game 4 ===
28 January 2014
20:00 CET

Boxscore

BCM Gravelines (France)	94–95	(Italy) Banco di Sardegna Sassari
Scoring by quarter: 21–31, 30–26, 22–16, 21–22
Pts: Diawara 27; Rebs: Bokolo 7 Asts: Bokolo 10		Pts: Thomas 22; Rebs: C. Green 6 Asts: M. Green 8

Sportica, Gravelines
Attendance: 2,500
Referees: Vicente Bulto (ESP), Renaud Geller (BEL), Mario Majkic (SLO)

29 January 2014
20:00 CET

Boxscore

Brose Baskets (Germany)	84–94	(Turkey) Aykon TED Ankara
Scoring by quarter: 25–26, 11–23, 26–16, 22–29
Pts: Sanders 15; Rebs: Wright 5 Asts: Gavel 6		Pts: Valters 26; Rebs: Golubović 8 Asts: Rašić 8

Stechert Arena, Bamberg
Attendance: 6,800
Referees: Emilio Perez Pizarro (ESP), Nicola Maestre (FRA), Jurgis Laurinavicius (LTU)

=== Game 5 ===
11 February 2014
20:00 CET

Boxscore

Brose Baskets (Germany)	70–59	(France) BCM Gravelines
Scoring by quarter: 21-18, 18-16, 19-8, 12-17
Pts: Sanders 14; Rebs: Harris, Veličković 5 Asts: Goldsberry 7		Pts: Diawara 16; Rebs: Camara 9 Asts: Bokolo 5

Stechert Arena, Bamberg
Attendance: 6,800
Referees: Juan Carlos Garcia Gonzalez (ESP), Radomir Vojinovic (MNE), jasmina Juras (SRB)

12 February 2014
18:00 CET

Boxscore

Aykon TED Ankara (Turkey)	104–75	(Italy) Banco di Sardegna Sassari
Scoring by quarter: 25-16, 23-25, 27-18, 29-16
Pts: Golubović 28; Rebs: Golubović 17; Asts: Rašić 8		Pts: Diener 13; Rebs: Thomas 6 Asts: Diener 6

Ankara Arena, Ankara
Attendance: 1,500
Referees: Sreten Radovic (CRO), Arnis Ozols (LAT), Carlos Cortes (ESP)

=== Game 6 ===
19 February 2014
20:00 CET

Boxscore

BCM Gravelines (France)	86–72	(Turkey) Aykon TED Ankara
Scoring by quarter: 24-22, 19-15, 22-21, 21-14
Pts: Camara 19; Rebs: Lewis 7 Asts: Bokolo 6		Pts: Candan 17; Rebs: Candan, Golubović 6 Asts: Baygül 4

Sportica, Gravelines
Attendance: 2,000
Referees: Roberto Chiari (ITA), Apostolos Kalpakas (SWE), Marcin Kowalski (POL)

19 February 2014
20:30 CET

Boxscore

Banco di Sardegna Sassari (Italy)	102–84	(Germany) Brose Baskets
Scoring by quarter: 25-23, 28-28, 20-20, 29-23
Pts: Green 32; Rebs: Green 6 Asts: Diener 7		Pts: Fischer 20; Rebs: Fischer 6 Asts: Gavel 4

Palasport Roberta Serradimigni, Sassari
Attendance: 3,950
Referees: Spiros Gkontas (GRE), Joseph Bissang (FRA), Benjamin Jimenez (ESP)
