= Keddric Mays =

American basketball player (born 1984)

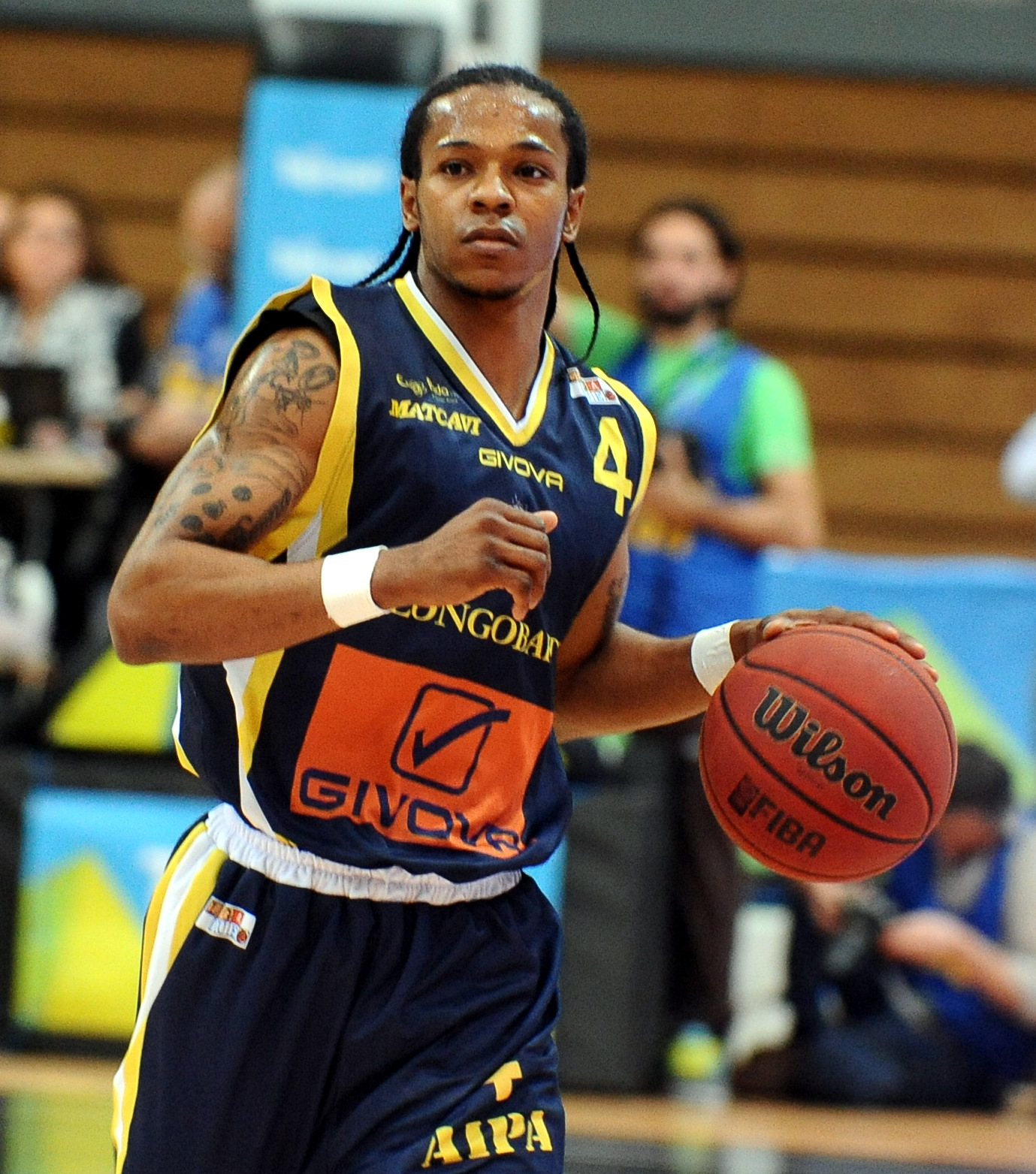
- Mays playing for Scafati, 2013

Baltur Cento
- Position: Point guard
- League: Serie A2 Basket

Personal information
- Born: September 17, 1984 (age 42) Lufkin, Texas, U.S.
- Listed height: 6 ft 0 in (1.83 m)

Career information
- High school: Livingston (Livingston, Texas)
- College: Cloud County CC (2003–2005); Chattanooga (2005–2007)
- NBA draft: 2007: undrafted
- Playing career: 2008–present

Career history
- 2008: Espoon Honka
- 2008–2009: Universidad Católica
- 2009–2010: Znicz Jarosław
- 2010–2011: Ferro-ZNTU
- 2011–2012: Politekhnika-Halychyna
- 2012–2013: Givova Scafati
- 2013: Igokea
- 2013–2014: Orlandina Basket
- 2014: SOMB Boulogne-sur-Mer
- 2015: Mersin Büyükşehir Belediyesi
- 2015–2017: Pallacanestro Trapani
- 2017–2018: Maccabi Kiryat Gat
- 2018–present: Baltur Cento

Career highlights
- PLK All-Star (2010)

Keddric D'Wayne Che' Jarmel Mays (born September 17, 1984) is an American professional basketball player for Baltur Cento of the Italian Serie A2 Basket.

== College career ==
Mays played junior college basketball at Cloud County Community College before moving to University of Tennessee at Chattanooga, where he graduated in 2007.

== Pro career ==
He arrived in Europe in February 2008, signing with Espoon Honka from Finland. He played only one game before he was released. In September 2008 he moved to Universidad Católica in División Mayor del Básquetbol de Chile.

Season 2009-10 he spend with Znicz Jarosław of the Polish Basketball League. Next two years he spend in Ukraine playing with Ferro-ZNTU and Politekhnika-Halychyna.

In August 2012, Mays signed with Givova Scafati of the Italian Second League, where he played 32 games, averaging 18.2 points, 3.7 rebounds and 3.0 assists per game.

On July 8, 2013, Mays signed with KK Igokea. He was released in October, after playing only two games with them. Later that month he signed with Orlandina Basket for the rest of the season.

In July 2014, he signed a one-year deal with the French team SOMB Boulogne-sur-Mer. He left Boulogne after only 7 games. In January 2015, he signed with Mersin Büyükşehir Belediyesi of the Turkish Second League for the rest of the season.

On August 1, 2015, he signed a one-year deal with the Italian team Pallacanestro Trapani. On July 27, 2016, he re-signed with Trapani for one more season.

On August 26, 2017, Mays signed with the Israeli team Maccabi Kiryat Gat for the 2017–18 season. Mays helped Kiryat Gat to reach the 2018 Liga Leumit Finals where they eventually lost Hapoel Be'er Sheva.

On July 6, 2018, Mays returned to Italy for a fourth stint, signing a one-year deal with Baltur Cento of the Italian Serie A2 Basket.
