= Marcus Lewis (basketball, born 1986) =

American professional basketball player

No. 7 – Hapoel Gilboa Galil
- Position: Power forward
- League: Liga Leumit

Personal information
- Born: August 5, 1986 (age 40) Long Beach, California, U.S.
- Listed height: 6 ft 8 in (2.03 m)
- Listed weight: 245 lb (111 kg)

Career information
- High school: Long Beach Poly (Long Beach, California)
- College: Portland (2004–2006); Oral Roberts (2007–2009)
- NBA draft: 2009: undrafted
- Playing career: 2009–present

Career history
- 2009: Znicz Jarosław
- 2009–2012: Tulsa 66ers
- 2012: Trotamundos de Carabobo
- 2012–2013: UCAM Murcia
- 2013–2014: BCM Gravelines
- 2014: Busan KT Sonicboom
- 2014–present: Hapoel Gilboa Galil

Career highlights
- All-NBA D-League Second Team (2012)
Medals
Men's basketball
Representing United States
Pan American Games
Bronze medal – third place	2011 Guadalajara	National team
FIBA Africa Clubs Champions Cup
Silver medal – second place	Luanda 2015	Rec do Libolo

Marcus Lewis (born August 5, 1986) is an American professional basketball player who currently plays for Hapoel Gilboa Galil. He has taken his team to the playoffs twice, and is currently in his third year. He has also played professionally in Poland for Znicz Jarosław, NBA Summer League with the Oklahoma City Thunder, training camp and NBA Pre-season with the Milwaukee Bucks, as well as playing in the Pan-American Games with Team USA and winning the bronze medal.

Lewis graduated from Oral Roberts University after transferring from University of Portland, where he played his first two years of collegiate basketball.

== High school ==
Lewis was a three-year letterwinner for coach Sharif Matoyer at Long Beach Poly High school. In the 2003–2004 season, he won the John Wooden Award and was a member of the 2003–04 CIF Division 1A Championship Team. Other Wooden Award winners include: Trevor Ariza, Arron Afflalo, Jordan Farmar, James Harden, Jordan Hamilton, Jrue Holiday and Kawhi Leonard. He was also a 2003 all-CIF first-team selection and the 2003 Moore League MVP, while helping lead Long Beach Poly High School to the 2003 Moore League Championship. He averaged 18 points and 11 rebounds per game his junior year and as a sophomore, Lewis tallied nine points and four rebounds per game, helping his team claim the CIF Division 1A Championship title. He was also a first-team all-Moore league pick in 2002.

== Collegiate career ==
Marcus Lewis began his collegiate career by accepting a scholarship to the University of Portland, a member of the West Coast Conference. Over two season with the Pilots, Lewis averaged 9.7 points and 5.7 rebounds. He was named to the West Coast Conference All-Freshman Team, while playing in all 30 games in 2005 after and averaging 9.1 points and 5.6 rebounds. Lewis had a career-best 14 rebounds against San Francisco as a freshman.

As a sophomore, Lewis averaged 10.5 points and 5.8 rebounds in 21 games and scored in double figures 25 times. He also double-digits in rebounding eight times and scored a career-high 21 points in the 2005–06 season-opener against Georgia Southern.

Marcus Lewis transferred to Oral Roberts University for the 2006–2007 season. As required by NCAA regulations, he was not allowed to play and therefore was a "red-shirt" player. He did practice with the team.

His junior year, Lewis was named to the Summit League All-Newcomer team. He ranked among Summit League leaders in rebounding (9th) and field-goal percentage (7th). Lewis began the season on the bench but emerged as a force after a 28-point effort against Texas A&M-Corpus Christi in the NIT Season Tip-Off. Oral Roberts was 22–6 with Lewis as a starter. He scored in double figures 13 times and reached double-digit rebounds five times, including a stretch of four consecutive efforts in February. In the Mayor's Cup Tournament, Lewis Scored 21 points with 8 rebounds in the win over Tulsa.

Lewis became a starter his senior year and started all 31 games of the season. He was a leader on both ends of the court and finished the season averaging 13 points, 7 rebounds, 2 assists, 1 block and 1 steal per game, while shooting 59% from the field.

== NBA D-League ==
Lewis signed with the Tulsa 66ers for the 2009–2010 season. He was used sparingly during his rookie year, as he only played 15 minutes per game, averaging 4 points and 3 rebounds. During the playoffs his role expanded and in 21 minutes of action per game, Lewis averaged 5 points and 5 rebounds.

The following season Lewis returned and saw an increase in minutes – 24 per game. Lewis averaged 8 points and 6 rebounds per contest and again helped his team reach the playoffs. In the playoffs, Lewis' numbers improved once again, tallying 10 points and 7 rebounds, and taking his team to the Western Conference Finals.

During the summer of 2011, Lewis and his agent Chris Patrick made the decision to turn down offers to play in Europe. Lewis decided to give one more push for the NBA and started the 2011–12 season off strong. Through the first six games of the season, he grabbed 76 rebounds making him the #1 rebounder in the NBA Development League. Before he could play the 7th game of the season, Lewis was called up to the Milwaukee Bucks for training camp. At the time his stats were 16 points, 13 rebounds, 2 assists and 1 steal per game.

== Abroad ==
In May 2012, he signed a contract until the season end with Trotamundos de Carabobo, a team from Venezuelan top basketball division. In July 2012, he signed a one-year deal with Spanish team UCAM Murcia. In August 2013, he signed with BCM Gravelines.

== NBA Summer League ==
In the summer of 2010, Lewis was called up by the Oklahoma City Thunder to play in the NBA Summer League. In 3 games, Lewis remained scoreless, but averaged 5 rebounds, 2 assists and 1 block per game, including an impressive 9 rebound performance in 23 minutes against the Indiana Pacers.

== NBA ==
On December 10, 2011, the Milwaukee Bucks announced Marcus Lewis on their training camp roster and signed him to a one-year, non-guaranteed contract.

== Team USA ==
During the summer of 2011 and in the midst of an NBA Lockout, Team USA made the unprecedented decision to use D-league players to play in the Pan American Games. Lewis was one of the 12 players selected and contributed almost immediately. With 12 seconds to go in the first game of the tournament, Lewis blocked 2 shots and hit the game-winning free throw, to give Team USA a 77–76 over the Dominican Republic.

Over the next four games Lewis would average 8 points and 5 rebounds in a very balanced effort by Team USA. In the Bronze-Medal game, Lewis put up 12 points (including the game winning basket) and grabbed 7 rebounds, helping the team bring the Bronze home to the US.
