= Zach Cleveland =

American basketball player (born 2004)

No. 25 – Memphis Hustle
- Position: Small forward
- League: NBA G League

Personal information
- Born: March 12, 2004 (age 22) Illinois, U.S.
- Listed height: 6 ft 7 in (2.01 m)
- Listed weight: 220 lb (100 kg)

Career information
- High school: Normal Community (Normal, Illinois)
- College: Liberty (2022–2026)
- NBA draft: 2026: undrafted
- Playing career: 2026–present

Career history
- 2026–present: Memphis Hustle

Career highlights
- Conference USA Player of the Year (2026); First-team All-Conference USA (2026); Second-team All-Conference USA (2024); Third-team All-Conference USA (2025)
- Stats at NBA.com
- Stats at Basketball Reference

Zachary Cleveland (born March 12, 2004) is an American basketball player for the Memphis Hustle of the NBA G League. He played college basketball for the Liberty Flames.

== High school career ==
Cleveland was born in southern Illinois and moved to Wisconsin before moving to Bloomington, Illinois. He attended Normal Community High School playing for coach Dave Witzig. As a junior, Cleveland averaged 21 points and 12.3 rebounds per game. He was named second team all-state as a senior and led the Ironmen to 33 victories. A three-star recruit, Cleveland committed to play college basketball at Liberty in November 2021.

== College career ==
As a freshman, Cleveland averaged 3.4 points, 3.4 rebounds, and 1.8 assists per game. He averaged 11.8 points, 6.3 rebounds, 4.0 assists, and 1.2 blocks per game as a sophomore. He was named to the Second Team All-Conference USA. Cleveland averaged 11.0 points, 6.3 rebounds and 5.1 assists per game as a junior. He was named to the Third Team All-Conference USA and was a finalist for the Lou Henson Award. On February 7, 2026, Cleveland posted a triple-double with 19 points, 10 rebounds, and 11 assists in a 79-76 win over Missouri State. As a senior, he received Conference USA Player of the Year honors as well as First Team All-Conference USA. Cleveland averaged 11.9 points, 7.6 rebounds and 6.8 assists per game and helped lead Liberty to a NIT appearance.

== Professional career ==
Cleveland signed with the Memphis Grizzlies on October 12, 2026, but was waived on October 17.
