= 2015–16 UTEP Miners men's basketball team =

American college basketball season

2015–16 UTEP Miners men's basketball

Corpus Christi Coastal Classic champions
- Conference: Conference USA
- Record: 19–14 (10–8 C-USA)
- Head coach: Tim Floyd (6th season)
- Assistant coaches: Phil Johnson; Bob Cantu; Ken DeWeese
- Home arena: Don Haskins Center

2015–16 Conference USA men's basketball standings
	Conf.				Overall
Team	W		L	PCT	W		L	PCT
UAB	16	–	2	.889	26	–	7	.788
Middle Tennessee †	13	–	5	.722	25	–	10	.714
Marshall	12	–	6	.667	17	–	16	.515
Louisiana Tech	12	–	6	.667	23	–	10	.697
Old Dominion	12	–	6	.667	25	–	13	.658
UTEP	10	–	8	.556	19	–	14	.576
Charlotte	9	–	9	.500	14	–	19	.424
Western Kentucky	8	–	10	.444	18	–	16	.529
North Texas	7	–	11	.389	12	–	20	.375
Rice	7	–	11	.389	12	–	20	.375
FIU	7	–	11	.389	13	–	19	.406
Florida Atlantic	5	–	13	.278	8	–	25	.242
Southern Miss*	5	–	13	.278	8	–	21	.276
UTSA	3	–	15	.167	5	–	27	.156
† 2016 C-USA Tournament winner *Ineligible for postseason play due to self-imposed postseason ban.

The 2015–16 UTEP Miners basketball team represented the University of Texas at El Paso during the 2015–16 NCAA Division I men's basketball season. The Miners, led by sixth year head coach Tim Floyd, played their home games at the Don Haskins Center and were members of Conference USA. They finished the season 19–14, 10–8 in C-USA play to finish in sixth place. They defeated FIU in the second round of the C-USA tournament to advance to the quarterfinals where they lost to Marshall. Despite having 19 wins and an above .500 record, they did not participate in a postseason tournament. UTEP averaged 7,385 fans per game, ranking 64th nationally.

== Previous season ==
The Miners finished the season 22–11, 13–5 in C-USA play to finish in a tie for the second place. They advanced to the semifinals of the C-USA tournament where they lost to Middle Tennessee. They were invited to the National Invitation Tournament where they lost in the first round to Murray State.

== Departures ==
Name	Number	Pos.	Height	Weight	Year	Hometown	Notes
Julian Washburn	4	G/F	6'8"	210	Senior	Duncanville, TX	Graduated
C. J. Cooper	5	G	6'0"	180	Senior	Chino, CA	Graduated
Lew Stallworth	13	G	6'1"	175	Freshman	Santa Clarita, CA	Transferred to Texas–Rio Grande Valley
Cedrick Lang	31	F	6'10"	255	Senior	Sioux Falls, SD	Graduated
Vince Hunter	32	F	6'8"	200	Sophomore	Detroit, MI	Declare for 2015 NBA draft
Darnell Vandivort	33	G	6'1"	145	Sophomore	El Paso, TX	Walk-on; didn't return

=== Incoming transfers ===
Name	Number	Pos.	Height	Weight	Year	Hometown	Previous school
Dominic Artis	1	G	6'1"	185	Junior	Oakland, CA	Junior college transferred from Diablo Valley College
Lee Moore	4	G	6'4"	175	Junior	Kennesaw, GA	Junior college transferred from Wallace State CC

== Class of 2015 recruits ==
College recruiting information
Name	Hometown	School	Height	Weight	Commit date
Paul Thomas; PF	Houston, TX	Summer Creek High School	6 ft 8 in (2.03 m)	190 lb (86 kg)	Sep 24, 2014
Paul Thomas; PF	Recruit ratings: Scout: Rivals: (80)				
Christian Romine; C	Mahomet, IL	Mahomet-Seymour High School	6 ft 10 in (2.08 m)	205 lb (93 kg)	Sep 8, 2014
Christian Romine; C	Recruit ratings: Scout: Rivals: (NR)				
Josh McSwiggan; SF	Loughborough, England	Charmwood College	6 ft 7 in (2.01 m)	N/A	Mar 14, 2015
Josh McSwiggan; SF	Recruit ratings: Scout: Rivals: (NR)				
Kelvin Jones; C	Hobbs, NM	Hobbs High School	6 ft 11 in (2.11 m)	210 lb (95 kg)	May 17, 2015
Kelvin Jones; C	Recruit ratings: Scout: Rivals: (NR)				
Brodricks Jones; C	Los Angeles, CA	Lawndale High School	6 ft 9 in (2.06 m)	205 lb (93 kg)	Aug 3, 2015
Brodricks Jones; C	Recruit ratings: Scout: Rivals: (NR)				
Overall recruit ranking:
Note: In many cases, Scout, Rivals, 247Sports, On3, and ESPN may conflict in their listings of height and weight.; In these cases, the average was taken. ESPN grades are on a 100-point scale.; Sources: "2015 Team Ranking". Rivals.

== Roster ==
2015–16 UTEP Miners men's basketball team
Players
Coaches

Pos.	#	Name	Height	Weight	Year	Previous school	Hometown
G	1	Dominic Artis	6 ft 3 in (1.91 m)	190 lb (86 kg)	Jr	Oregon	San Francisco, CA
G	2	Omega Harris	6 ft 2 in (1.88 m)	170 lb (77 kg)	So	Putnam City West HS	Bethany, OK
F	3	Brodricks Jones	6 ft 10 in (2.08 m)	200 lb (91 kg)	Fr	Lawndale HS	Los Angeles, CA
G	4	Lee Moore	6 ft 4 in (1.93 m)	175 lb (79 kg)	Jr	Wallace State CC	Kennesaw, GA
F	5	Paul Thomas	6 ft 8 in (2.03 m)	200 lb (91 kg)	Fr	Summer Creek HS	Humble, TX
G/F	11	Jake Flaggert	6 ft 7 in (2.01 m)	200 lb (91 kg)	RS So	Lovejoy HS	Lucas, TX
F	12	Terry Winn	6 ft 7 in (2.01 m)	230 lb (104 kg)	RS Fr	Westwind Prep Acad	Monroe, LA
G	13	Victor Mbachu	6 ft 1 in (1.85 m)	170 lb (77 kg)	RS Sr	Angelina College	Houston, TX
G	15	Tevin Caldwell	6 ft 3 in (1.91 m)	180 lb (82 kg)	RS Sr	Cochise College	El Paso, TX
G	20	Earvin Morris	6 ft 4 in (1.93 m)	175 lb (79 kg)	Sr	Tallahassee CC	Memphis, TN
G	21	Trey Touchet	6 ft 2 in (1.88 m)	175 lb (79 kg)	RS Fr	Saint Thomas More HS	Lafayette, IN
C	23	Hooper Vint	6 ft 11 in (2.11 m)	235 lb (107 kg)	Sr	Van Buren HS	Van Buren, AR
F	31	Ivan Venegas	6 ft 8 in (2.03 m)	235 lb (107 kg)	Fr	Tecnologico de Monterrey Campus	Chihuahua, Mexico
F/C	34	Christian Romine	6 ft 9 in (2.06 m)	220 lb (100 kg)	Fr	Mahomet-Seymour HS	Mahomet, IL
C	41	Matt Willms	7 ft 1 in (2.16 m)	235 lb (107 kg)	Jr	Findlay Prep	Leamington, ON

Head coach

- Tim Floyd (Louisiana Tech)

Assistant coach(es)

- Phil Johnson (East Central)
- Bob Cantu (Chapman)
- Ken DeWeese (Mary Hardin–Baylor)

Legend

- (C) Team captain
- (S) Suspended
- (I) Ineligible
- (W) Walk-on
- Injured
- Current redshirt

Roster

== Schedule ==
Date time, TV	Opponent	Result	Record	Site (attendance) city, state
Exhibition
10/31/2015*; 2:00 pm	Cameron	W 78–69		Don Haskins Center (5,112); El Paso, TX
11/07/2015*; 7:05 pm	East Central Oklahoma	W 78–66		Don Haskins Center (6,384); El Paso, TX
Non-conference regular season
11/14/2015*; 7:05 pm	Loyola (New Orleans)	W 96–49	1–0	Don Haskins Center (7,596); El Paso, TX
11/21/2015*; 7:30 pm	Texas State	W 77–62	2–0	Don Haskins Center (7,311); El Paso, TX
11/22/2015*; 7:05 pm	Alcorn State; Corpus Christi Coastal Classic	W 88–66	3–0	Don Haskins Center (6,005); El Paso, TX
11/24/2015*; 7:05 pm	Florida A&M; Corpus Christi Coastal Classic	W 72–54	4–0	Don Haskins Center (6,682); El Paso, TX
11/27/2015*; 4:00 pm, CBSSN	vs. Southern Illinois; Corpus Christi Coastal Classic semifinals	W 71–66	5–0	American Bank Center (264); Corpus Christi, TX
11/28/2015*; 4:00 pm, CBSSN	vs. Colorado State; Corpus Christi Coastal Classic championship	W 99–90 ^{2OT}	6–0	American Bank Center (274); Corpus Christi, TX
12/02/2015*; 7:00 pm	at New Mexico State; Battle of I-10	L 59–73	6–1	Pan American Center (6,303); Las Cruces, NM
12/05/2015*; 6:00 pm, ASN	Texas–Arlington	L 62–76	6–2	Don Haskins Center (7,567); El Paso, TX
12/13/2015*; 4:00 pm, P12N	at Washington State	L 68–84	6–3	Beasley Coliseum (1,917); Pullman, WA
12/19/2015*; 7:00 pm, ASN	New Mexico State; Battle of I-10	L 53–73	6–4	Don Haskins Center (9,040); El Paso, TX
12/21/2015*; 7:00 pm	Norfolk State; Sun Bowl Invitational semifinals	L 76–85	6–5	Don Haskins Center (7,746); El Paso, TX
12/22/2015*; 5:00 pm	Sam Houston State; Sun Bowl Invitational 3rd place game	W 87–68	7–5	Don Haskins Center (5,946); El Paso, TX
12/29/2015*; 7:05 pm	Texas–Rio Grande Valley	W 85–64	8–5	Don Haskins Center (6,819); El Paso, TX
Conference USA regular season
01/01/2016; 7:00 pm, ASN	Rice	W 61–60	9–5 (1–0)	Don Haskins Center (7,154); El Paso, TX
01/03/2016; 3:00 pm, ASN	North Texas	W 84–75	10–5 (2–0)	Don Haskins Center (6,585); El Paso, TX
01/07/2016; 5:00 pm, ASN	at Middle Tennessee	L 72–78	10–6 (2–1)	Murphy Center (4,105); Murfreesboro, TN
01/09/2016; 12:00 pm, CBSSN	at UAB	L 80–87	10–7 (2–2)	Bartow Arena (4,287); Birmingham, AL
01/16/2016; 2:00 pm, ASN	at UTSA	L 67–71	10–8 (2–3)	Convocation Center (1,550); Birmingham, AL
01/21/2016; 7:05 pm	Florida Atlantic	W 71–56	11–8 (3–3)	Don Haskins Center (6,054); El Paso, TX
01/23/2016; 7:05 pm	FIU	L 69–79	11–9 (3–4)	Don Haskins Center (7,688); El Paso, TX
01/28/2016; 6:00 pm	at Southern Miss	L 58–71	11–10 (3–5)	Reed Green Coliseum (2,824); Hattiesburg, MS
01/30/2016; 2:00 pm, FSN	at Louisiana Tech	L 70–78	11–11 (3–6)	Thomas Assembly Center (4,131); Ruston, LA
02/04/2016; 7:05 pm	Marshall	W 112–108	12–11 (4–6)	Don Haskins Center (6,993); El Paso, TX
02/06/2016; 3:00 pm, FS1	WKU; 1966 50th Anniversary Game	W 93–89 ^{OT}	13–11 (5–6)	Don Haskins Center (12,000); El Paso, TX
02/11/2016; 5:00 pm	at FIU	W 84–74	14–11 (6–6)	FIU Arena (936); Miami, FL
02/13/2016; 4:00 pm, ASN	at Florida Atlantic	W 89–82	15–11 (7–6)	FAU Arena (1,254); Boca Raton, FL
02/18/2016; 7:05 pm	Southern Miss	W 78–73	16–11 (8–6)	Don Haskins Center (7,012); El Paso, TX
02/20/2016; 4:00 pm, CBSSN	Louisiana Tech	W 91–80	17–11 (9–6)	Don Haskins Center (7,313); El Paso, TX
02/25/2016; 5:00 pm, FSN	at Old Dominion	L 53–74	17–12 (9–7)	Ted Constant Convocation Center (6,887); Norfolk, VA
02/27/2016; 5:00 pm	at Charlotte	L 78–88	17–13 (9–8)	Dale F. Halton Arena (5,813); Charlotte, NC
03/05/2016; 2:00 pm	UTSA	W 81–74	18–13 (10–8)	Don Haskins Center (7,430); El Paso, TX
Conference USA tournament
03/09/2016; 8:30 pm, ASN	vs. FIU; Second round	W 85–77	19–13	Legacy Arena (3,905); Birmingham, AL
03/10/2016; 8:30 pm, ASN	vs. Marshall; Quarterfinals	L 85–87	19–14	Legacy Arena (3,933); Birmingham, AL
*Non-conference game. ^{#}Rankings from AP Poll. (#) Tournament seedings in parentheses. All times are in Mountain Time.

== See also ==
- 2015–16 UTEP Lady Miners basketball team
