= Steve Logan (basketball) =

American basketball player (born 1980)

Personal information
- Born: March 20, 1980 (age 46) Cleveland, Ohio, U.S.
- Listed height: 5 ft 10 in (1.78 m)
- Listed weight: 195 lb (88 kg)

Career information
- High school: St. Edward (Lakewood, Ohio)
- College: Cincinnati (1998–2002)
- NBA draft: 2002: 2nd round, 30th overall pick
- Drafted by: Golden State Warriors
- Playing career: 2002–2007
- Position: Point guard

Career history
- 2004–2005: Texas Tycoons
- 2005–2006: Mersin BB
- 2006: Kolossos Rodou
- 2006: Benfica
- 2006: Znicz Jarosław
- 2007: Hapoel Galil Elyon

Career highlights
- Consensus first-team All-American (2002); 2× Conference USA Player of the Year (2001, 2002); 2× First-team All-Conference USA (2001, 2002); Frances Pomeroy Naismith Award winner (2002)
- Stats at Basketball Reference
Medals
Men's basketball
Representing United States
FIBA U19 World Championship
Silver medal – second place	1999 Lisbon	Team competition

Steve Deontay Logan (born March 20, 1980) is an American former professional basketball player. He played college basketball for the Cincinnati Bearcats. He became a star point guard in his collegiate career, and was named a first team All-American his senior year along with future NBA players Jay Williams, Juan Dixon, Drew Gooden, and Dan Dickau.

== High school and college career ==
He attended St. Edward High School in Lakewood, Ohio. He starred alongside Sam Clancy Jr., leading St. Edward to the 1998 Ohio High School Athletic Association State "big school" basketball championship during their senior year. Logan won the Ohio Gatorade player of the year award in his senior year, and graduated in 1998.

He attended the University of Cincinnati, becoming one of the best players in the country in his junior and senior years. His junior and senior year, he was the Conference USA Player of the year. In his senior season, he averaged 22.0 points per game, 12th best in the country. He is Cincinnati's third all-time leading scorer with 1,985 points (behind Oscar Robertson and Sean Kilpatrick) and second in assists with 456. He was named First Team All-America by the Associated Press and First Team All-Conference USA.

== Professional career and contract dispute ==
Despite strong performances in his senior year, Logan slipped to the first pick of the second round (30th overall) of the 2002 NBA draft, where he was drafted by the Golden State Warriors. As a result of being a second-round selection, he was not entitled to a guaranteed contract and the Warriors refused to offer him one. Meanwhile, Logan and his agent argued that he should have been offered a guaranteed contract since he was in fact the 29th player taken in the draft as the Minnesota Timberwolves had to forfeit their first-round pick due to the Joe Smith salary cap-evading scandal. Logan also argued that the Warriors' second round pick in the 2001 NBA draft, Gilbert Arenas, had received a guaranteed contract despite being the 31st overall pick.

After a bitter contract dispute with the Warriors and reportedly being out of shape at the 2002 Southern California Summer Pro League, Logan did not sign a contract. On October 24, 2002, Shedrick Howard, the assistant of Logan's agent Bill Strickland, claimed Logan would sign a contract "in the next 48 hours" in light of the release of Rafer Alston in the preseason, but that did not come to fruition. On October 31, 2002, the San Francisco Chronicle reported that the unsigned Logan had left the Bay Area and returned to his hometown Cleveland to rehab a minor foot injury, fueling speculations that his foot injury might be delaying his signing. In November 2002, Howard claimed that he would be available to sign with the Warriors in five to seven days and disputed report that Logan's continued absence was a "holdout". On November 26, 2002, Logan was reportedly working out in Washington DC, where his agent Bill Strickland was based, with no sign of a resolution to his contract dispute.

In December 2002, Logan was sighted working out at the University of Cincinnati while Warriors general manager Garry St. Jean was increasingly showing less urgency in getting Logan signed. In an interview with the Cincinnati Post, Logan stated that his holdout had been a "frustrating process", that he was looking forward to getting his career started, and that he was hoping to join the Warriors in early January 2003.

On January 4, 2003, Logan was rumored to be considering playing in Poland or Spain, but the sticking point was that Warriors would retain his draft rights if he played professionally in any capacity while Logan would be eligible to enter the 2003 NBA draft in June 2003 if he sat out the season. On January 9, 2003, amid rumor that Logan was planning to sit out the season and re-enter the draft in June, Shedrick Howard, the assistant to his agent Bill Strickland, stated that Logan was planning to join the NBDL because Logan "can't afford to sit out the whole year because he has a family to take care of." Signing with the NBDL or any professional leagues would make Logan ineligible to enter the 2003 NBA draft because the Warriors would retain his rights. On January 11, 2003, the NBDL officially announced that Logan had joined the Mobile Revelers. However, Logan left the team before appearing in a game. Mobile Revelers head coach Sam Vincent claimed that Logan was not in game shape and did not express a desire to return to the NBDL, but was nevertheless open to him re-joining the team. On January 19, 2003, Shedrick Howard, the assistant to Logan's agent Bill Strickland, claimed Logan had left to take care of his ill mother in Cleveland and would return to the Revelers the following week. Howard also denied speculations that Logan was considering switching agents. Despite not playing a game in the NBDL or even officially practiced with the Revelers, the NBA clarified that Logan had relinquished his right to enter the 2003 NBA draft because he had signed with the NBDL.

In February 2003, Logan fired his agent Bill Strickland and signed with Joel Bell, presumably because he did not know joining the NBDL would prevent him from entering the 2003 NBA draft. Bell sent Logan to Pittsburgh to train with his other client, Vonteego Cummings, who was an unrestricted free agent, and targeted the United States Basketball League (USBL) for Logan's professional debut. Logan ultimately did not sign with the USBL.

Despite the fact that Logan did not play basketball for over a year, he was not eligible to enter the 2003 NBA draft and the Warriors continued to retain his rights due to his brief stint in the NBDL. In June 2003, Logan hired presumptive first overall pick LeBron James' agent Aaron Goodwin as an advisor and stopped speaking to Joel Bell. Goodwin stated that Logan had returned to the Bay Area, was training with a strength and conditioning coach to get back into basketball shape, hoping for a fair opportunity with the Warriors, and that three other NBA teams had expressed interest in acquiring Logan's rights.

In July 2003, Logan worked out for the Warriors with the hope of landing spot on the Warriors' Summer Pro League team in Long Beach. Logan ultimately was not included on the Warriors' Summer League roster.

In August 2004, Logan's draft right was traded to the Dallas Mavericks.

In November 2004, after not playing basketball since the 2002 NCAA Division I men's basketball tournament, Logan was announced as part of the roster of the Texas Tycoons of the American Basketball Association. On November 8, 2004, Tycoon's assistant coach Jalie Mitchell stated that Logan had left the team before he appeared in a game.

In 2005, Logan joined Mersin BB of the Basketbol Süper Ligi in Turkey. More than three years after the 2002 NBA draft, Logan made his long-awaited professional basketball debut on October 16, 2005, in Turkey. He scored a season-high 32 points with the Mersin BB on January 8, 2006.

In 2006, he played in Poland (Znicz Jarosław) and the next year in Israel.

In a May 2011 interview, Logan stated he had not played competitively for two to three years due to surgery to repair a meniscus tear.

With his unofficial retirement in 2007, Logan became one of the few first-team All-Americans since the formation of the NBA to never appear on an NBA active roster. He (along with his high school teammate Sam Clancy Jr.) was one of nine players selected in the 2002 NBA Draft who never played a game in the league and the highest pick out of the nine. Only five of them were Americans and Logan was the only one who never signed an NBA contract and never appeared in an NBA preseason game.

== Post-playing career ==
Since his retirement, Logan is involved in running youth basketball camps. As of 2021, he is training elementary school and high school basketball players at Elite Athletic Sports Complex in Cincinnati and running his own AAU team "Logans Elites".

In July 2009, Cincinnati announced that Logan would be inducted into the UC Athletics Hall of Fame in February 2010. He was officially inducted to the University of Cincinnati Athletics Hall of Fame in 2010. However, due to legal issues (see #Legal issues), he was not allowed to attend his induction ceremony in February 2010.

In 2017, Logan was inducted into the Greater Cincinnati Basketball Hall of Fame along with Wally Szczerbiak and Aaron Williams.

In August 2020, Logan graduated from the University of Cincinnati with a degree in Interdisciplinary Studies.

Beginning with the 2023-24 UC Basketball season, Logan will serve as an analyst for home games with Dan Hoard when primary radio analyst former Bearcat Terry Nelson is working ESPN+ broadcasts.

== Legal issues ==
In August 2009, Logan went on the run after he was accused of rape. He was picked up by Deputy US Marshals and Northeast Ohio Fugitive Task Force without incident. He was charged with strong-arm rape and gross sexual imposition. All chargers were dropped against, Steve Logan. Logan's lawyer, Larry Zukerman, said an investigation showed that the woman who made the charges against Logan didn't tell the truth.

In April 2010, the rape charges were dismissed, but Logan pleaded guilty to a separate charge of domestic violence against the mother of his child and was fined $250.
