= Conference USA Men's Basketball Player of the Year =

Basketball award

- Awarded for: the most outstanding basketball player in Conference USA
- Country: United States

History
- First award: 1996
- Most recent: Zach Cleveland, Liberty

The Conference USA Men's Basketball Player of the Year is an award given to Conference USA's (CUSA) most outstanding player. The award was first given following CUSA's inaugural 1995–96 season. Two players have received the award multiple times: Danny Fortson (1996, 1997) and Steve Logan (2001, 2002). Coincidentally, both players attended the University of Cincinnati. Another Bearcat, Kenyon Martin, won the CUSA Player of the Year award the same season he was selected as the consensus national player of the year (2000).

Cincinnati and Memphis have the most awards, with five each; Memphis has the most individual winners, with all of its awards having been won by different players. However, neither school is currently a member of the conference. Due to CUSA having lost many members in all three of the major conference realignment cycles of the 21st century (2005, early 2010s, and 2020s), only four of the 12 current member schools have had a winner, with only Middle Tennessee having had more than one. Delaware and Missouri State played their first CUSA seasons in 2025–26.

== Key ==
†	Co-Players of the Year
*	Awarded a national player of the year award that same season: UPI College Basketball Player of the Year (1954–55 to 1995–96); Oscar Robertson Trophy (1958–59 to present); Naismith College Player of the Year (1968–69 to present); John R. Wooden Award (1976–77 to present)
Player (X)	Denotes the number of times the player has been awarded the Conference USA Player of the Year award at that point

== Winners ==
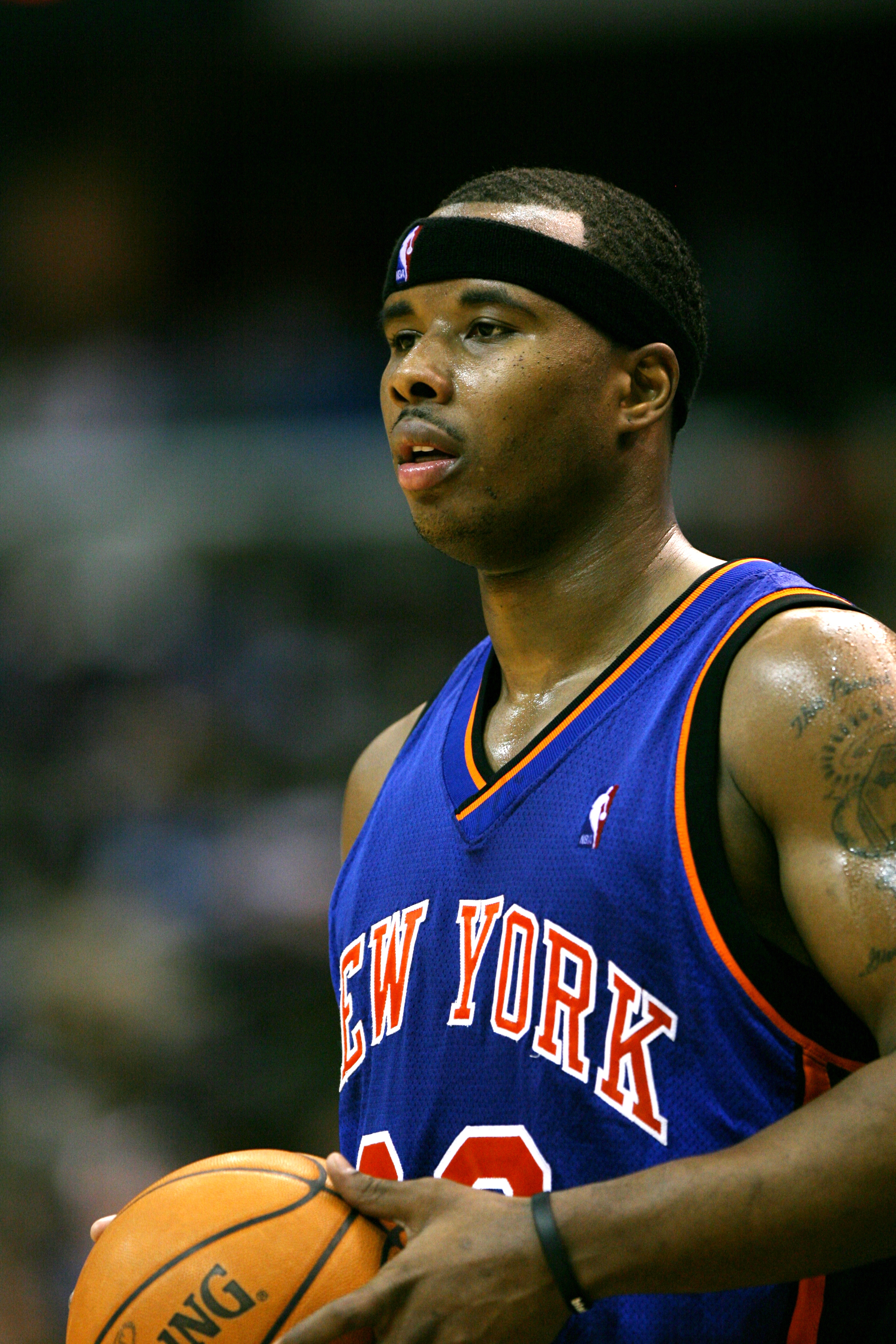
Quentin Richardson, DePaul, 1999

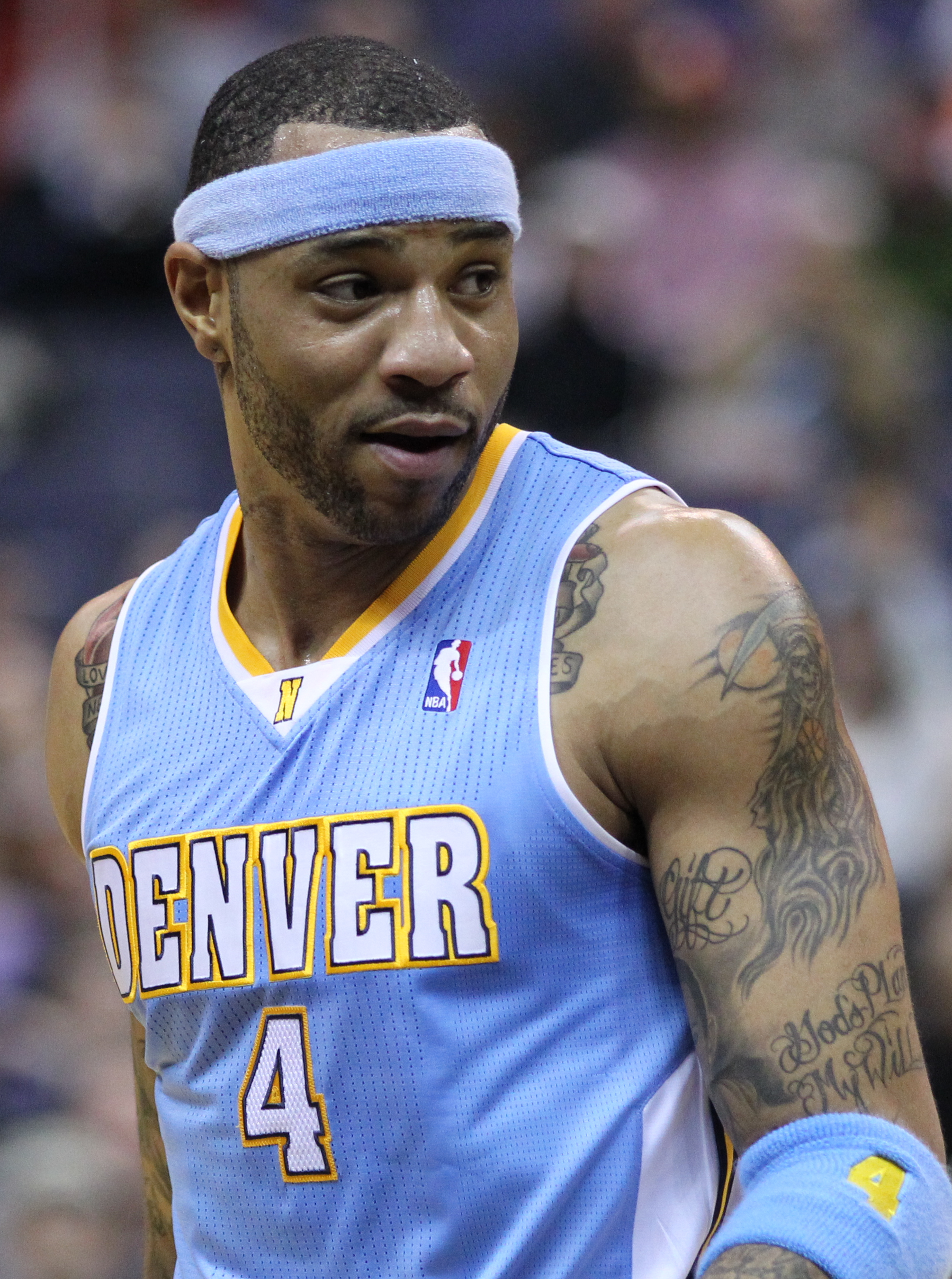
Kenyon Martin, Cincinnati, 2000

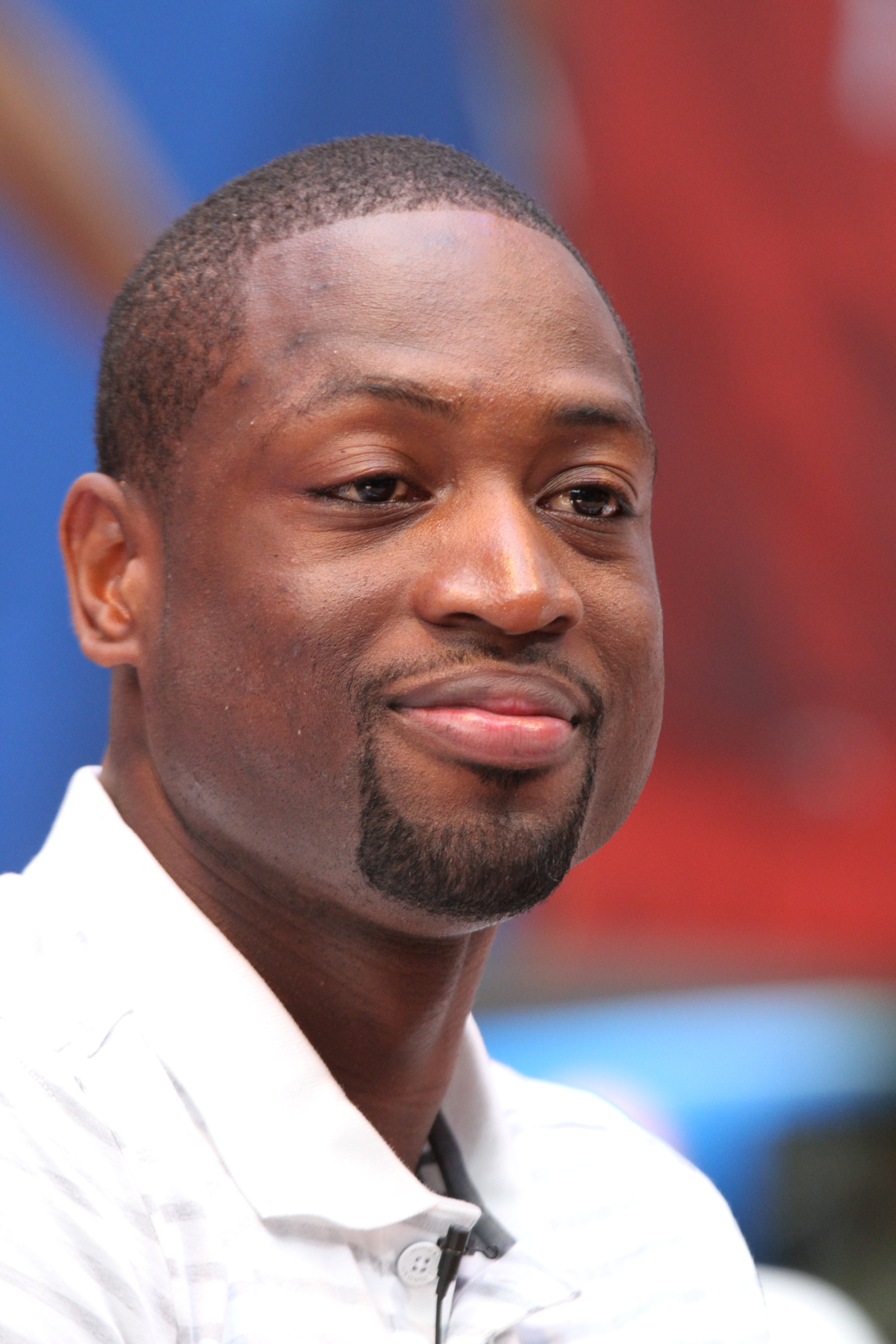
Dwyane Wade, Marquette, 2003

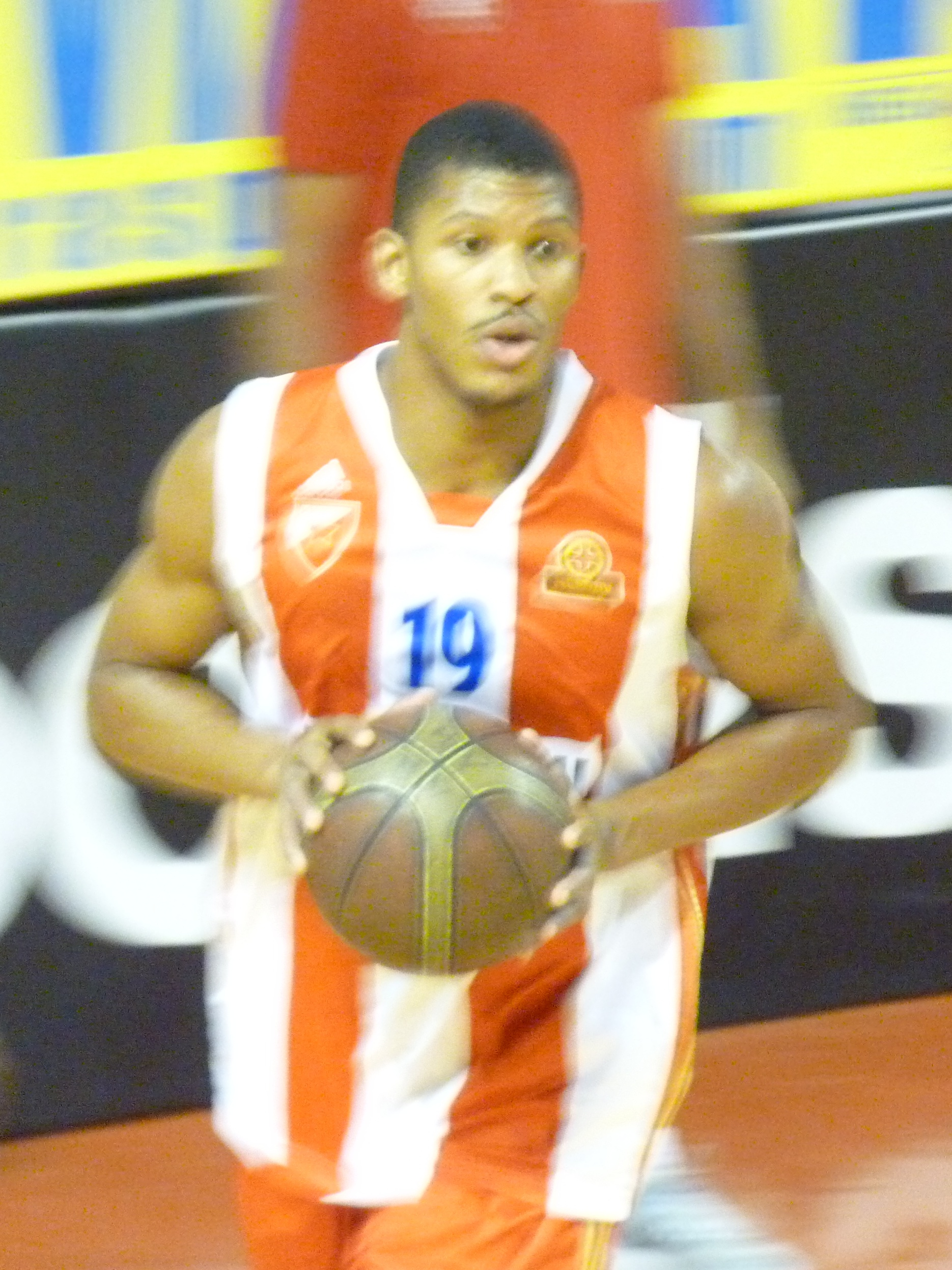
Morris Almond, Rice, 2007

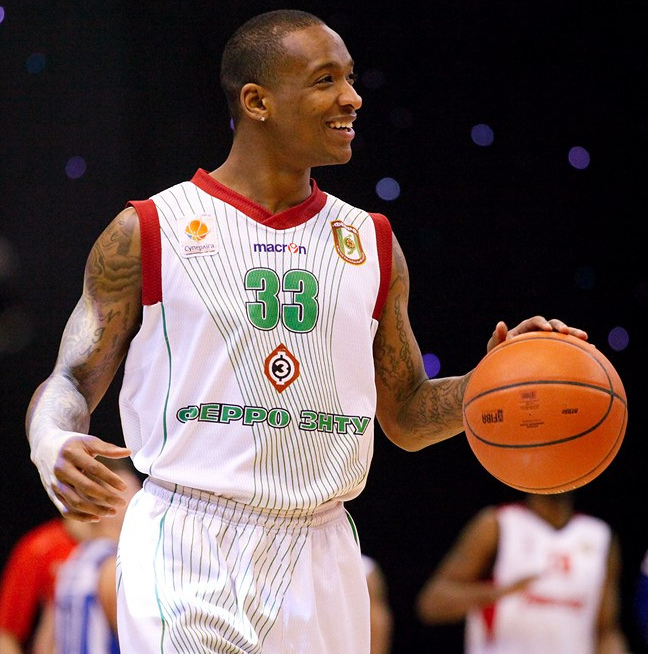
Randy Culpepper, UTEP, 2010

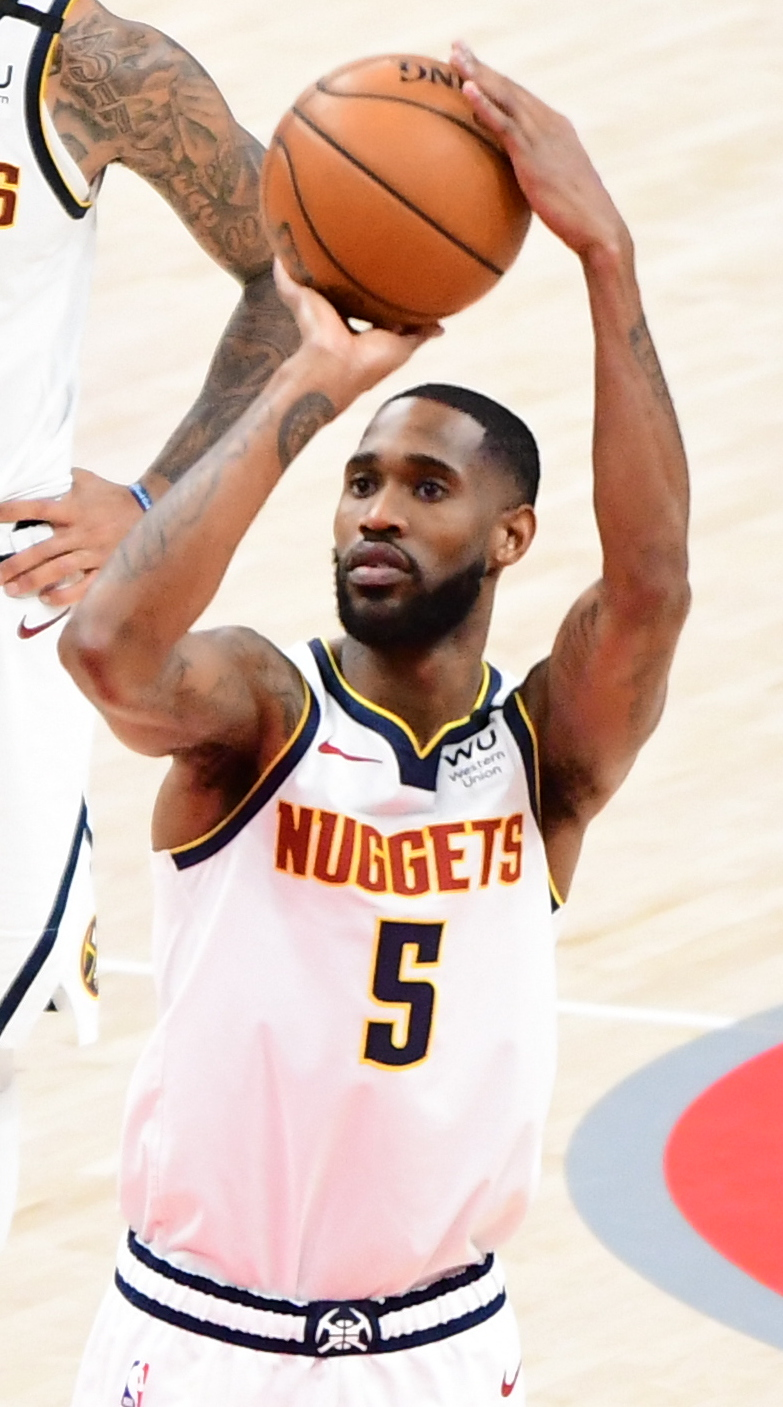
Will Barton, Memphis, 2012

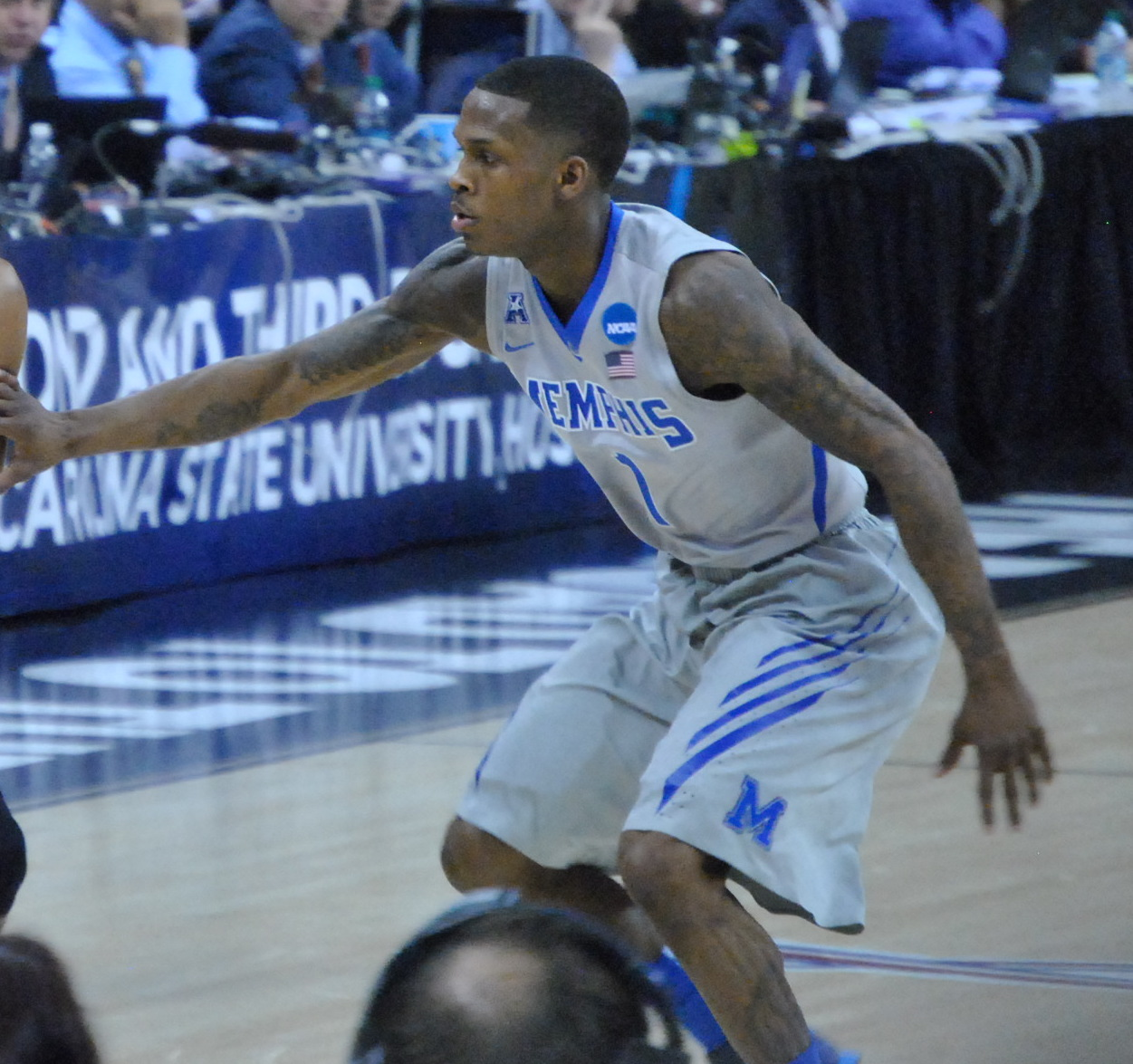
Joe Jackson, Memphis, 2013

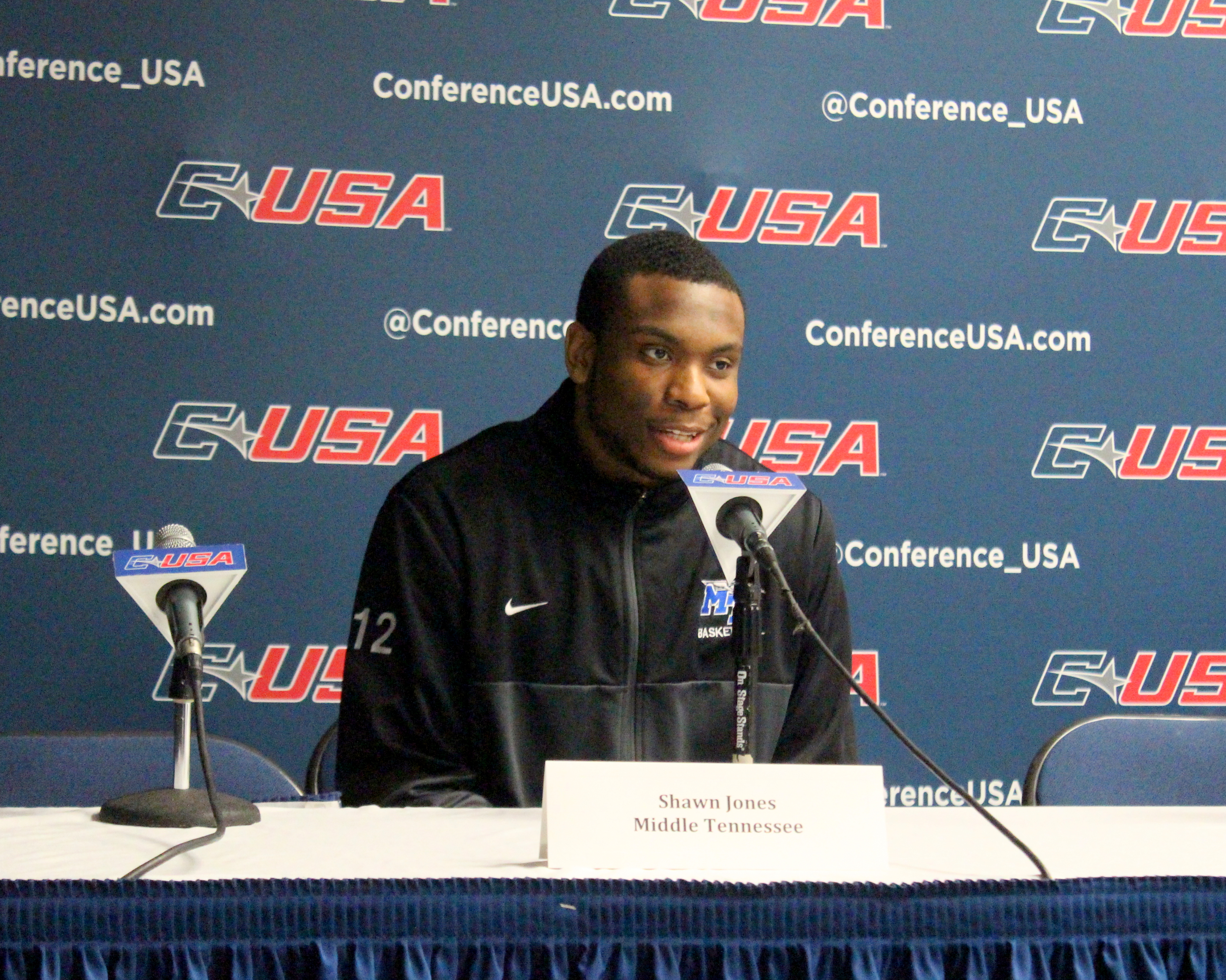
Shawn Jones, Middle Tennessee, 2014

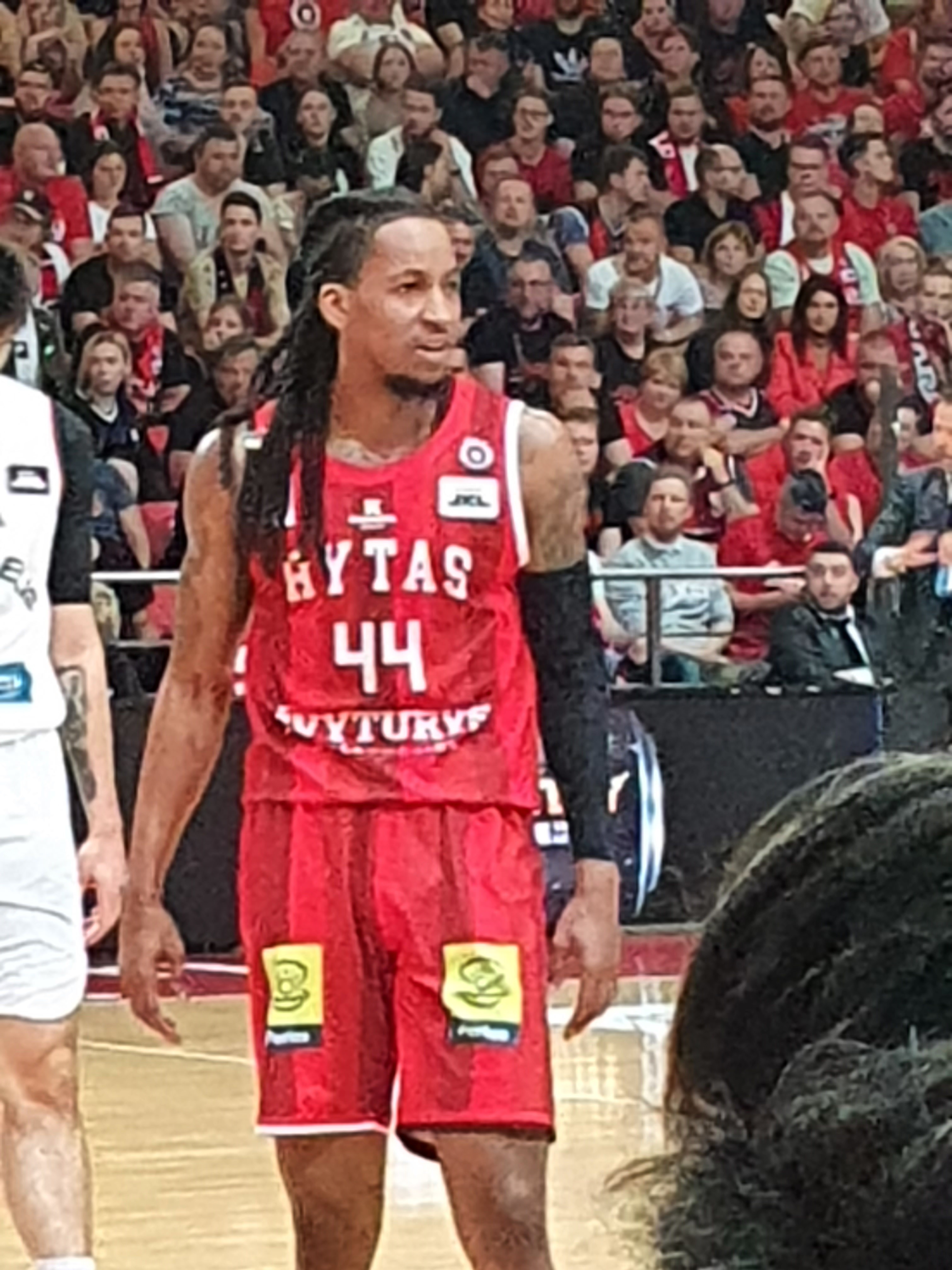
Speedy Smith, Louisiana Tech, 2015

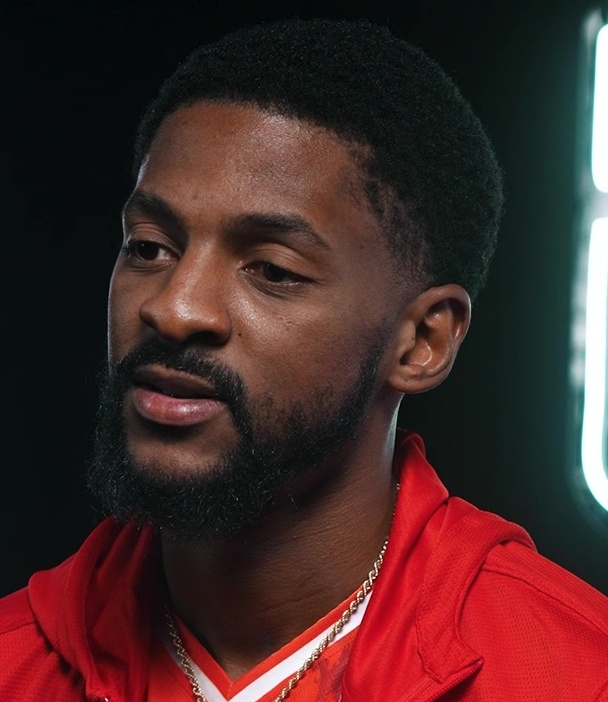
Alex Hamilton, Louisiana Tech, 2016

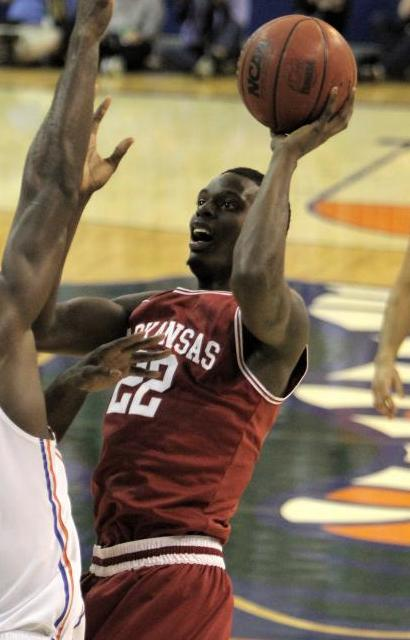
JaCorey Williams, Middle Tennessee, 2017

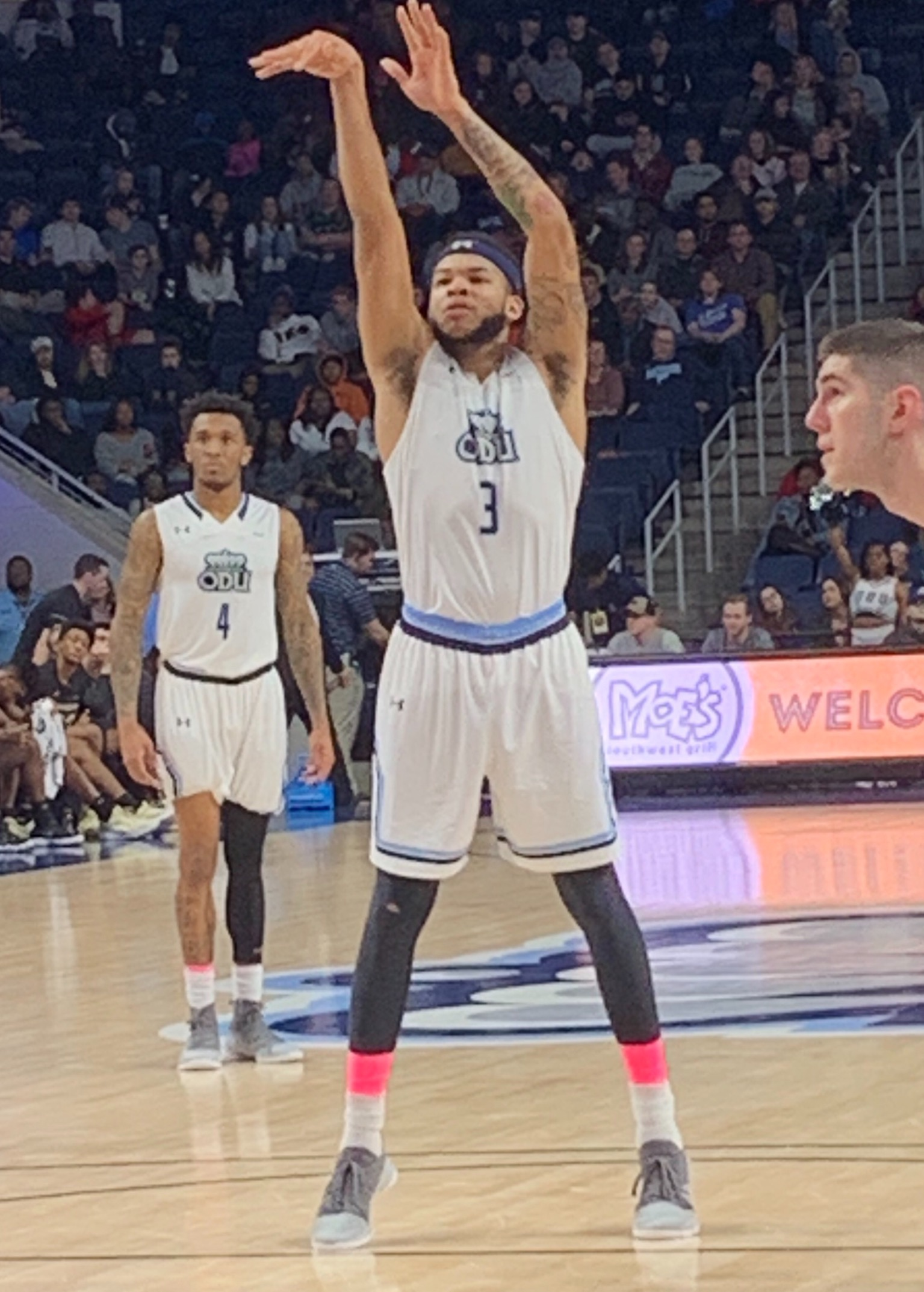
B. J. Stith, Old Dominion, 2019

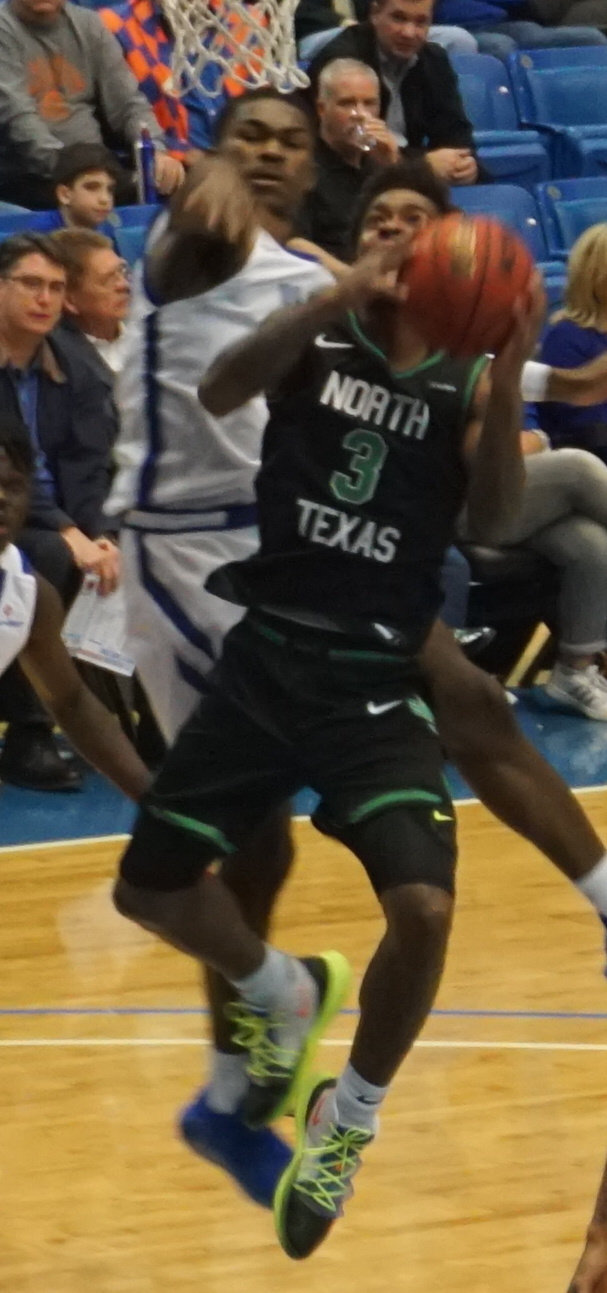
Javion Hamlet, North Texas, 2020

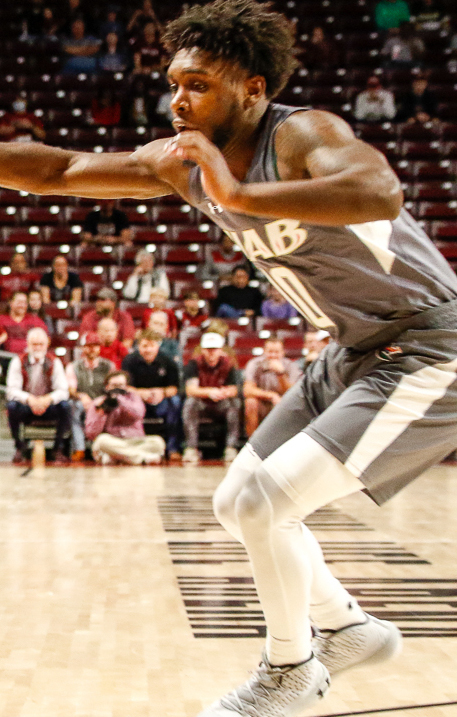
Jordan Walker, UAB, 2022

Season	Player	School	Position	Class	Reference
1995–96	Danny Fortson	Cincinnati	PF	Sophomore	
1996–97	Danny Fortson (2)	Cincinnati	PF	Junior	
1997–98	DeMarco Johnson	Charlotte	F	Senior	
1998–99	Quentin Richardson	DePaul	SG / SF	Freshman	
1999–00	Kenyon Martin*	Cincinnati	PF	Senior	
2000–01	Steve Logan	Cincinnati	PG	Junior	
2001–02	Steve Logan (2)	Cincinnati	PG	Senior	
2002–03	Dwyane Wade	Marquette	SG	Junior	
2003–04	Antonio Burks	Memphis	PG	Senior	
2004–05	Eddie Basden	Charlotte	SG / SF	Senior	
2005–06	Rodney Carney	Memphis	SF	Senior	
2006–07	Morris Almond	Rice	G	Senior	
2007–08	Chris Douglas-Roberts	Memphis	SG	Junior	
2008–09	Jermaine Taylor	UCF	G	Senior	
2009–10	Randy Culpepper	UTEP	G	Junior	
2010–11	Aaron Johnson	UAB	PG	Senior	
2011–12	Will Barton	Memphis	SG	Sophomore	
2012–13	Joe Jackson	Memphis	PG	Junior	
2013–14	Shawn Jones	Middle Tennessee	PF	Senior	
2014–15	Speedy Smith	Louisiana Tech	PG	Senior	
2015–16	Alex Hamilton	Louisiana Tech	SG	Senior	
2016–17	JaCorey Williams	Middle Tennessee	PF	Senior	
2017–18	Nick King	Middle Tennessee	PF	Senior	
2018–19	B. J. Stith	Old Dominion	SG	Senior	
2019–20	Javion Hamlet	North Texas	PG	Junior	
2020–21	Charles Bassey	Western Kentucky	C	Junior	
2021–22	Jordan Walker	UAB	PG	Senior	
2022–23	Tylor Perry	North Texas	SG	Senior	
2023–24	Isaiah Crawford	Louisiana Tech	F	Graduate	
2024–25	Jaron Pierre Jr.	Jacksonville State	SG	Senior	
2025–26	Zach Cleveland	Liberty	F	Senior	

== Winners by school ==
Years of joining reflect the start of the first season of basketball competition for each school, which coincides with the schools' arrival in CUSA except in the special case of Houston. Award years reflect the calendar years in which each season ended.

School (year joined)	Winners	Years
Cincinnati (1995) (Note: Charlotte, Cincinnati, DePaul and Marquette were founding members of CUSA in 1995, but all joined other conferences in 2005. Charlotte left for the Atlantic 10 Conference while the other three left for the Big East Conference. Following the 2013 split of the Big East into a non-football Big East and the football-sponsoring American Athletic Conference (now known as the American Conference), Cincinnati joined the American, while DePaul and Marquette remained in the current Big East. Cincinnati would move to the Big 12 Conference in 2023.)	5	1996, 1997, 2000, 2001, 2002
Memphis (1995) (Note: Houston, Memphis, SMU, and UCF left for the American in 2013. Houston and UCF moved to the Big 12 in 2023, and SMU moved to the Atlantic Coast Conference in 2024.)	5	2004, 2006, 2008, 2012, 2013
Louisiana Tech (2013) (Note: Louisiana Tech left in 2026 to rejoin the Sun Belt Conference, which it had left in 2001.)	3	2015, 2016, 2024
Middle Tennessee (2013)	3	2014, 2017, 2018
Charlotte (1995/2013) (Note: Charlotte rejoined CUSA in 2013, but moved to the American in 2023.)	2	1998, 2005
North Texas (2013) (Note: Florida Atlantic, North Texas, Rice, UAB, and UTSA joined the American alongside Charlotte in 2023.)	2	2020, 2023
UAB (1995)	2	2011, 2022
DePaul (1995)	1	1999
Jacksonville State (2023)	1	2025
Liberty (2023)	1	2026
Marquette (1995)	1	2003
Old Dominion (2013) (Note: Marshall, Old Dominion, and Southern Miss joined the Sun Belt Conference in 2022.)	1	2019
Rice (2005)	1	2007
UCF (2005)	1	2009
UTEP (2005) (Note: UTEP joined the Mountain West Conference in 2026.)	1	2010
Western Kentucky (2014)	1	2021
Delaware (2025)	0	—
East Carolina (2001) (Note: East Carolina, Tulane, and Tulsa joined the American in 2014.)	0	—
FIU (2013)	0	—
Florida Atlantic (2013)	0	—
Houston (1996) (Note: The University of Houston was a founding member in 1995, but did not begin competing until 1996 because of its commitments to the final year of competition of the Southwest Conference.)	0	—
Kennesaw State (2024)	0	—
Marshall (2005)	0	—
Missouri State (2025)	0	—
New Mexico State (2023)	0	—
Sam Houston (2023)	0	—
SMU (2005)	0	—
Southern Miss (1995)	0	—
Tulane (1995)	0	—
Tulsa (2005)	0	—
UTSA (2013)	0	—
