= Alex Hamilton (basketball) =

American basketball player (born 1993)

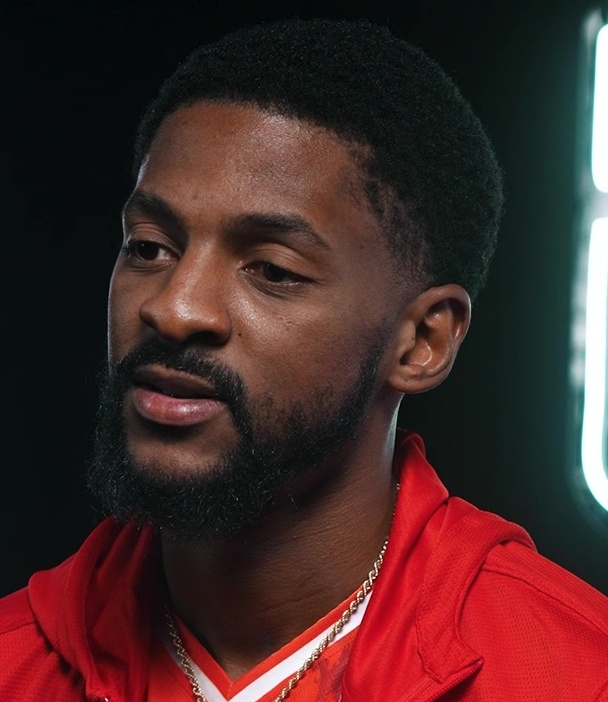

No. 55 – Atléticos de San Germán
- Position: Point guard / shooting guard
- League: BSN

Personal information
- Born: October 5, 1993 (age 33) Marianna, Florida, U.S.
- Listed height: 6 ft 4 in (1.93 m)
- Listed weight: 195 lb (88 kg)

Career information
- High school: Chipley (Chipley, Florida)
- College: Louisiana Tech (2012–2016)
- NBA draft: 2016: undrafted
- Playing career: 2016–present

Career history
- 2016–2018: Santa Cruz Warriors
- 2018: Windy City Bulls
- 2018: Juventus Utena
- 2018–2020: Maccabi Rishon LeZion
- 2020–2021: Galatasaray
- 2021: Telekom Baskets Bonn
- 2021: Hapoel Eilat
- 2022–2023: Juventus Utena
- 2023: Wilki Morskie Szczecin
- 2023–2024: Maccabi Ironi Ramat Gan
- 2024: Hapoel Haifa
- 2024–2025: Parma
- 2025: Nizhny Novgorod
- 2025: Indios de Mayagüez
- 2025: Avtodor Saratov
- 2026–present: Atléticos de San Germán

Career highlights
- Polish League champion (2023); Lithuanian League steals leader (2023); Israeli League All-Star (2019); AP Honorable Mention All-American (2016); Conference USA Player of the Year (2016); First-team All-Conference USA (2016); Conference-USA All-Defensive Team (2016); Second-team All-Conference USA (2015); Third-team All-Conference USA (2014)
- Stats at Basketball Reference

George Alexander Hamilton III (born October 5, 1993) is an American professional basketball player for the Atléticos de San Germán of the Baloncesto Superior Nacional (BSN). He played college basketball for Louisiana Tech, where he was named Conference USA Player of the Year in 2016.

== College career ==
Hamilton, a 6'4" shooting guard from Chipley High School in Chipley, Florida, came to Louisiana Tech in 2012 and became one of the program's leading all-time scorers. In his senior season, Hamilton was named the Conference USA Player of the Year, as well as earning all-conference and All-Defensive team honors.

== Professional career ==
=== Santa Cruz Warriors (2016–2018) ===
After going undrafted in the 2016 NBA draft, Hamilton joined the Los Angeles Clippers for the 2016 NBA Summer League. On August 11, 2016, he signed with Polish team MKS Dąbrowa Górnicza, but was released two months later before playing in a game for them. On October 30, 2016, he was selected by the Oklahoma City Blue with the third overall pick in the 2016 NBA Development League Draft. He was later traded to the Santa Cruz Warriors on draft night.

Hamilton played for the Golden State Warriors in the 2017 NBA Summer League. He was then signed under a training camp deal by the Golden State Warriors. However, on September 30, 2017, he was waived.

=== Windy City Bulls (2018) ===
On February 12, 2018, Hamilton was traded by the Santa Cruz Warriors to the Windy City Bulls along with Will Davis II and Santa Cruz's 2018 third-round draft pick in exchange for the returning player rights to Thomas Walkup.

=== Juventus Utena (2018) ===
On September 2, 2018, the Lithuanian side Juventus Utena was reported to have signed Hamilton to a 1+1 deal. On November 25, 2018, Hamilton recorded a season-high 24 points, shooting 8-of-15 from the field, along with nine rebounds and six assists in an 86–75 win over Dzūkija. In 11 LKL games, he averaged 13.4 points, 4 rebounds, 3.6 assists and 2.2 steals per game, shooting 48 percent from three-point range.

=== Maccabi Rishon LeZion (2018–2020) ===
On December 12, 2018, Hamilton parted ways with Juventus to join Maccabi Rishon LeZion of the Israeli Premier League, signing for the rest of the season. On January 2, 2019, Hamilton recorded 21 points along with seven assists, six rebounds, three blocks and two steals, leading Rishon LeZion to a 95–93 win over Ironi Nes Ziona. In 31 games played for Rishon LeZion, he finished the season as the league fourth-leading passer with 5.1 assists per game, to go with 13.1 points, 4.1 rebounds and 1.5 steals per game. Hamilton helped Rishon LeZion reach the 2019 Israeli League Final, where they eventually lost to Maccabi Tel Aviv.

On July 3, 2019, Hamilton signed a one-year contract extension with Rishon LeZion. On October 16, 2019, Hamilton recorded a EuroCup career-high 22 points, shooting 5-of-9 from the field, along with five rebounds, eight assists, two steals and three blocks for 38 PIR in a 77–72 win over Monaco. He was named the EuroCup round 3 MVP. On January 2, 2020, Hamilton recorded a career-high 32 points, while shooting 10-of-15 from the field, along with five rebounds, five assists and five steals for 43 PIR, leading Rishon LeZion to a 94–81 over Maccabi Ashdod. Hamilton averaged 15.8 points, 4.7 rebounds, 4.8 assists and 1.9 steals per game.

=== Galatasaray (2020–2021) ===
On July 16, 2020, Hamilton signed with Galatasaray of the Turkish Basketbol Süper Ligi (BSL). Hamilton averaged 11.9 points and 4.2 assists per game.

=== Telekom Baskets Bonn (2021) ===
On February 16, 2021, Hamilton signed with Telekom Baskets Bonn of the Basketball Bundesliga (BBL). He averaged 10.4 points, 3.2 assists, and 1.9 steals per game.

=== Hapoel Eilat (2021–present) ===
On November 6, 2021, Hamilton signed with Hapoel Eilat of the Israeli Basketball Premier League.

=== Return to Juventus (2022–2023) ===
On August 11, 2022, Hamilton returned to Juventus Utena for a second stint with the club, signing a one-year deal.

=== Wilki Morskie Szczecin (2023) ===
On March 27, 2023, he signed with Wilki Morskie Szczecin of the Polish Basketball League (PLK).

=== Avtodor Saratov (2025) ===
In October 2025, Hamilton signed with BC Avtodor for the 2025-2026 season.
