= Bryant Stith =

American basketball player (born 1970)

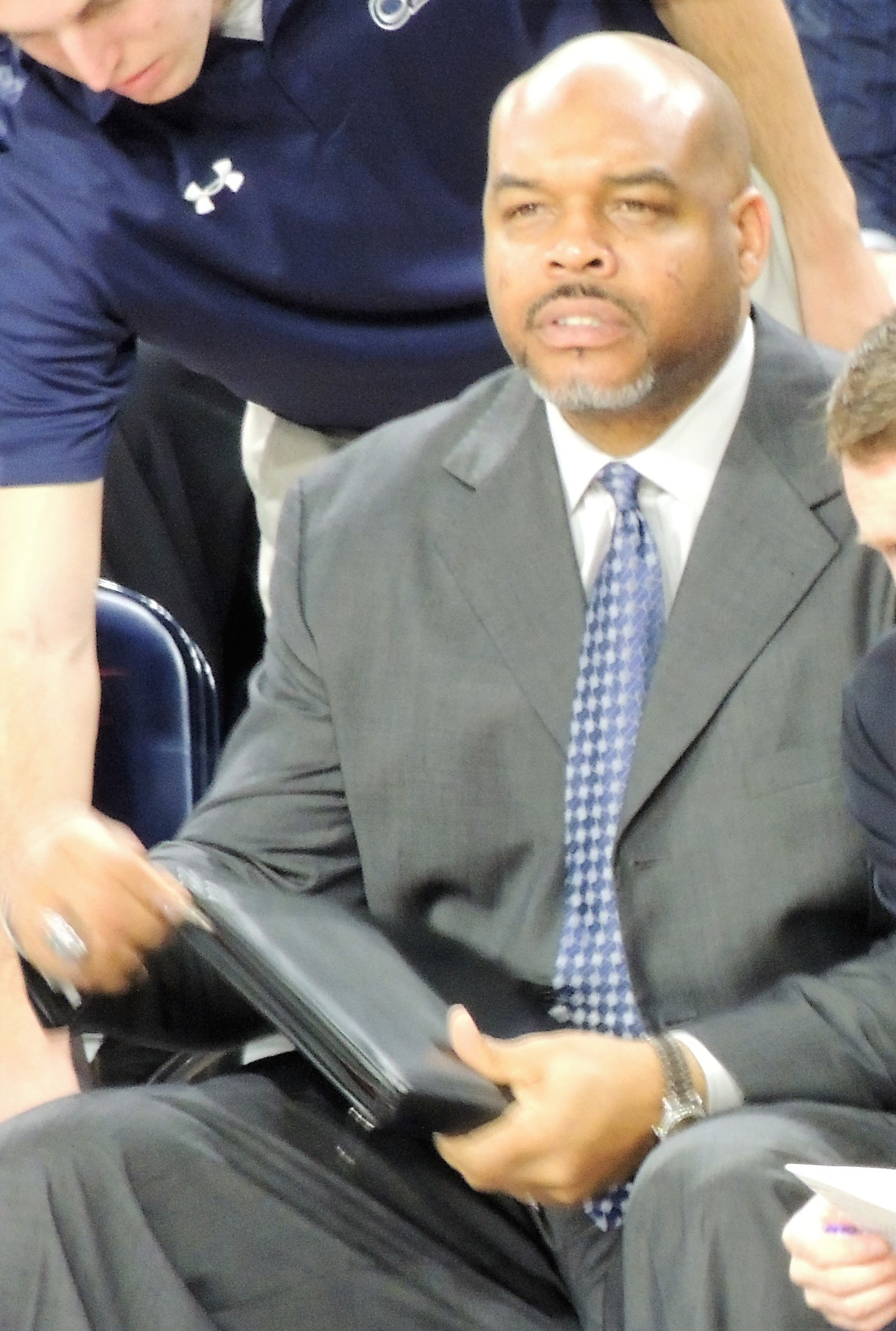
- Stith coaching in 2015

Hampton University
- Title: Associate Head Coach
- League: Southern Conference

Personal information
- Born: December 10, 1970 (age 55) Emporia, Virginia, U.S.
- Listed height: 6 ft 5 in (1.96 m)
- Listed weight: 208 lb (94 kg)

Career information
- High school: Brunswick (Lawrenceville, Virginia)
- College: Virginia (1988–1992)
- NBA draft: 1992: 1st round, 13th overall pick
- Drafted by: Denver Nuggets
- Playing career: 1992–2002
- Position: Shooting guard
- Number: 23, 20
- Coaching career: 2003–present

Career history

Playing
- 1992–2000: Denver Nuggets
- 2000–2001: Boston Celtics
- 2001–2002: Cleveland Cavaliers

Coaching
- 2003–2013: Brunswick HS
- 2013–2022: Old Dominion (assistant)
- 2022–present: UNC Greensboro (assistant)

Career highlights
- 3× AP honorable mention All-American (1990–1992); 3× First-team All-ACC (1990–1992); ACC Rookie of the Year (1989); NIT MVP (1992); NIT champion (1992); No. 20 retired by Virginia Cavaliers; Third-team Parade All-American (1988)

Career NBA statistics
- Points: 5,946 (10.1 ppg)
- Rebounds: 1,983 (3.4 rpg)
- Assists: 1,178 (2.0 apg)
- Stats at NBA.com
- Stats at Basketball Reference
Medals
Men's basketball
Representing United States
FIBA World Championship
Bronze medal – third place	1990 Buenos Aires	National team
Goodwill Games
Silver medal – second place	1990 Seattle	National team

Bryant Lamonica Stith (born December 10, 1970) is an American former professional basketball player who played in the National Basketball Association (NBA). He is currently a men's assistant basketball coach at University of North Carolina Greensboro.

== Playing career ==
=== College career ===
Stith was the Atlantic Coast Conference Men's Basketball Rookie of the Year in 1989. He finished his career in 1992 as Virginia's all-time leading scorer with 2,516 points. Stith earned first-team All-ACC honors three times and was named the Most Valuable Player of the 1992 National Invitation Tournament. During Stith's time at Virginia, the Cavaliers compiled four 20-win seasons, three NCAA appearances and the 1992 National Invitation Tournament championship.

=== Professional career ===
A 6-foot-5-inch (1.96 m) shooting guard, Stith was selected from the University of Virginia with the 13th overall pick by the Denver Nuggets in the 1992 NBA draft. Stith played only 39 games in his rookie season, but would play (and start) all 82 games next season (1993–94) averaging 12.5 points per game. Stith later on struggled with injures in his career with the Nuggets. Stith played eight seasons with the team before being traded to the Boston Celtics. He was also traded to the Cleveland Cavaliers and to the Los Angeles Clippers along with Andre Miller for Darius Miles. He retired before ever playing for the Clippers.

=== International career ===
He played for the US national team in the 1990 FIBA World Championship, winning the bronze medal.

== Coaching career ==
After the close of his NBA career, Stith became the head coach of the Brunswick (VA) High School Bulldogs. The team won state championships in 2011, 2012, and 2013.

In 2013, Stith was hired as an assistant at Old Dominion University to work under his former Virginia head coach Jeff Jones.

In 2022, he moved from Old Dominion to Mike Jones's coaching staff at UNC Greensboro.

== Personal ==
Stith's sons, Brandan and B.J., committed to play basketball at East Carolina University in 2013 and the University of Virginia in 2014, respectively. After one year at East Carolina, Brandan transferred to Old Dominion to play for his father who is ODU's assistant coach.

B.J. played one year at the Virginia before also transferring to Old Dominion University to play for his father, and with his brother. He sat out the 2015–16 season and played three years for the Monarchs.

Since retiring from the NBA, Stith has been involved in NASCAR, in which he owns a team with race car driver and fellow Emporia native, Hermie Sadler.

In 2007, he was inducted into the Virginia Sports Hall of Fame.
