= B. J. Stith =

American basketball player

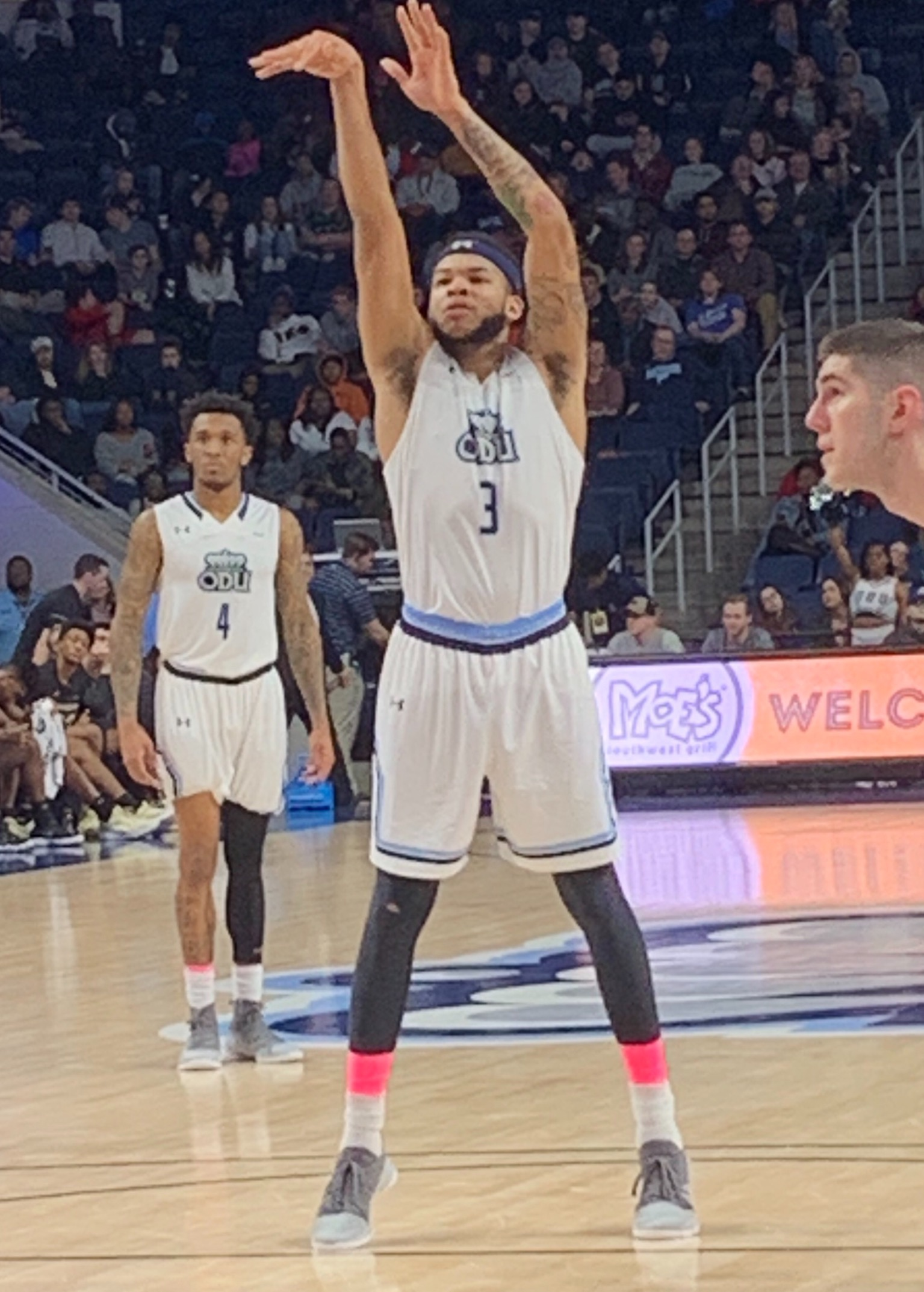
- Stith playing for Old Dominion in February 2019

Personal information
- Born: December 5, 1995 (age 30) Denver, Colorado, U.S.
- Listed height: 6 ft 5 in (1.96 m)
- Listed weight: 210 lb (95 kg)

Career information
- High school: Brunswick (Lawrenceville, Virginia); Oak Hill Academy (Mouth of Wilson, Virginia)
- College: Virginia (2014–2015); Old Dominion (2016–2019)
- NBA draft: 2019: undrafted
- Playing career: 2019–2020
- Position: Shooting guard

Career history
- 2019: Ionikos Nikaias
- 2020: Leuven Bears
- 2020: ZZ Leiden

Career highlights
- AP Honorable Mention All-American (2019); Conference USA Player of the Year (2019); First-team All-Conference USA (2019); Third-team All-Conference USA (2018)

Broderick Jamal Stith (born December 5, 1995) is an American former professional basketball player, who lastly played for ZZ Leiden of the Dutch Basketball League. He played college basketball for the Old Dominion Monarchs.

== Early life and high school ==
Stith is the son of Old Dominion assistant coach and former NBA player Bryant Stith. He played alongside his brother Brandan Stith at Brunswick High School and helped the team to three state titles. In his senior season, Stith transferred to Oak Hill Academy. He was ranked No. 65 in the class of 2014 by rivals.com, and No. 99 by ESPN.

== College career ==
Stith began his collegiate career at Virginia where he averaged 1.0 points and 0.3 rebounds in 13 games as a freshman. After the season, he transferred to Old Dominion to play for his father and alongside his brother. Stith posted 10.8 points per game as a redshirt sophomore. As a junior, Stith averaged 14.2 points and 5.7 rebounds per game and was named to the Third–team All-Conference USA.

As a senior, Stith averaged 16.8 points and 7.5 rebounds per game. He was named Conference USA Player of the Year, an all-district selection by the National Association of Basketball Coaches and AP Honorable Mention All-American. He helped Old Dominion to a 26–9 record and NCAA Tournament appearance. Stith had 14 points and 10 rebounds as the Monarch lost to Purdue 61–48.

== Professional career ==
On August 1, 2019, Stith signed his first professional contract with Ionikos Nikaias of the Greek Basket League. On December 16 of the same year, Stith was released by the Greek team and replaced with Alan Arnett. He signed with the Leuven Bears of the Pro Basketball League in 2020, playing alongside brother Brandan. Stith returned to Virginia in late March due to the coronavirus pandemic. He was forced to train at home, and his original wedding date in July 2021 was postponed due to the inability to begin the planning process.

On August 25, 2020, he signed with ZZ Leiden of the Dutch Basketball League.
