= Znicz Jarosław =

Polish basketball team

Znicz Jarosław was a Polish basketball team, based in Jarosław. Founded in 1957, they folded in 2011.

== Seasons ==
- 2008–09
  - Znicz Jarosław returned to the Dominet Bank Ekstraliga
- 2007–08
  - 1st place in I Liga
- 2006–07
  - 13th place in Dominet Bank Ekstraliga and relegation to the I Liga
