= Bethel High School (Virginia) =

Coordinates: 37.05343°N 76.43008°W

Location
- 1067 Big Bethel Road; Hampton, Virginia 23666; United States

Information
- Type: Public high school
- Founded: 1968
- School district: Hampton City Schools
- Superintendent: Jeffery Smith
- Principal: Tanya V. Howard
- Teaching staff: 114.80 (FTE)
- Grades: 9-12
- Enrollment: 1,766 (2017-18)
- Student to teacher ratio: 15.38
- Language: English
- Campus: Suburban
- Colors: Green; Gold
- Athletics conference: Virginia High School League; AAA Peninsula District; AAA Eastern Region
- Team name: Bruins
- Rival: Hampton High School
- Communities served: Northampton, Farmington, Westview Lakes, Michael's and Hampton Woods, Aberdeen Gardens, Fox Hill, and Newmarket.
- Website: http://bhs.sbo.hampton.k12.va.us/

Bethel High School is a public high school located in the northwestern section of Hampton, Virginia, United States. Bethel is the third of four public high schools in Hampton City Schools along with Kecoughtan, Hampton, and Phoebus.

== History ==
Bethel High School was built in 1968 to handle the overflow of Hampton High School and Kecoughtan High School students. Since the school board liked the Kecoughtan High School floor plan, Bethel's floor plan was designed similarly, with only a couple of differences (e.g., the courtyard and the 900 hallways). Bethel was named after the area of Bethel and also after the Civil War battle of Big Bethel. Since the school was in a rural location at the time, Bethel had the biggest school zone in the city. Most residents from Langley Field heading west toward the city of Newport News were all zoned for Bethel. Today the school is still considered the highest-populated school and still has the biggest zone in the city of Hampton. The W. H. Belanga construction company built the school.

The building was completed 22 days behind schedule. The school district's board of trustees chose to reduce the payment to the builder, and in return the builder decided to dispute the reduction.

In January 1969, a public library, the Bethel Library, was set to open on the property of the high school. This library was to be managed by the municipal public library system and not by the public school district. The cost was $72,000.

- Dennis Kozlowski began teaching and coaching at Bethel High School in 1968. He became head football coach in 1974 and his teams won 172 games and three state championships (Group AAA in 1974 and 1976, and Division 5 in 1992). He coached track from 1968 through 1993, producing more than 75 individual or relay state champions. Kozlowski's teams won Group AAA outdoor state championships in 1975, 1984, and 1986. As the school's athletic director from 1983 through 2000, Bethel teams won 21 Peninsula District titles and 13 state team championships. He was inducted into the Hampton Hall of Fame in 2014.
- In 2010 Bethel was establishing an arena racing team, which would be the first such one in a high school in the United States. The school partnered with Hampton Roads Racing in an effort to raise student involvement, provide mentorship opportunities, and improve graduation rates.
- In 2010, Phenix School (K-8) opened behind Bethel High, making Phenix and Bethel a shared campus.
- In late 2010, during winter break, the school began a remodeling project. Promethean boards were installed in all classrooms. The gym got a complete make over with a new finish and logo on the floor. In June 2011, new light fixtures were installed and the ceiling was lowered. Many of the classrooms have been repainted, and the awnings in the courtyard and main entrance/bus loading zone have been replaced, and the gym has been remodeled.

== Campus ==
A 1968 article by the Daily Press stated that the high school was "generally [to] resemble Kecoughtan High School in appearance."

The school-operated library, in 1968, had a color scheme with gold and pimento.

== Feeder pattern ==
- Aberdeen Elementary School
- Burbank Elementary School
- Forrest Elementary School
- Kraft Elementary School
- Machen Elementary School
- Phenix PreK-8 School (Behind Bethel High School's campus)
- Philips Elementary
- Tucker-Capps Fundamental School
- Tarrant Middle School
- Eaton Fundamental Middle School
- Jones Magnet Middle School
- Kilgore Gifted Center

== Demographics ==
Student Ethnicity Source: VA Dept. of Education, 2004-2005 Ethnicity This School State Average

- Black 100%- 60%
- White, non-Hispanic 12% 27%
- Hispanic 2% 7%
- Asian/Pacific Islander 2% 5%
- American Indian/Alaska Native <1% <1%

== Athletics ==
Bethel's athletic teams are nicknamed "Bruins", and the school colors are green and gold.

The school won three football state championships in 1974, 1976 and 1992, with coach "Koz" Kozlowski leading them to each title.

Former NBA superstar Allen Iverson led Bethel to state championships in both basketball and football. He was drafted first overall by the Philadelphia 76ers in the 1996 NBA Draft. Iverson is a four-time NBA scoring champion, an 11-time NBA All-Star, and the 2001 NBA MVP. In 2003, Bethel honored the former Bruin by retiring his high school basketball jersey.

Todd Kelly, former NFL professional athlete who attended University of Tennessee. He is a 1989 Bethel High School graduate. Kelly won the state 110 high hurdles in 1987, All-State football player in 1988, and All-State baseball player in 1989. He was an All-State and All-American defensive end at University of Tennessee in 1992. He was drafted in the first round 27th pick by the San Francisco 49ers in the 1993 NFL draft. In 2008, Bethel honored the former Bruin by retiring his high school football jersey.

Mike London, former head football coach at the University of Virginia, is a 1979 Bethel High School graduate. London won the NCAA I-AA National Championship as head coach at University of Richmond in 2008. He is the current head football coach for the William & Mary Tribe football program at the College of William & Mary in Williamsburg, Virginia

In the 2005-2006 basketball season the Bethel varsity basketball team enjoyed an undefeated regular season (27–0), number two ranking in the state and was led by Coach Craig Brehon and power forwards Duke Crews (All-American) and Jamel McLean. Crews attended the University of Tennessee where he had some health issues. McLean attended Xavier University in Ohio. He went undrafted in 2011 and eventually signed with the Leuven Bears of Belgium for the 2011–12 season. He now plays for the Italian club Emporio Armani Milano.

It also has a successful track team who captured back to back state titles in 2005 and 2006. The boys track team attained a national championship in the 4x200 and 4x400 meter relays in 2007 and defended its 4x400 title in 2008. Individually its Francena Mccorory who broke the national 400 meter record indoor as well as the 300 meters and Ja-Vell Bullard who won two state titles in the 500 and 300 and also 400 meters in indoor and outdoor nationals. Both have graduated with McCorory going to Hampton University and Bullard to George Mason University

Nathan Schy also won the 1998 AAA wrestling state championship.

Bethel Football enjoyed a Cinderella story for the 2007 season. Under 1st year coach Jeff Nelson and led by the performances of RB Jontel Evans, DB Marcus Cooperwood, and QB Aris Mcglone-English, the Bruins stunned the Peninsula District by enjoying a 9–1 regular season, which its only loss came courtesy of crosstown rival and defending state champion Phoebus High School. They also beat Hampton High School for the first time since 1992. They defeated Ocean Lakes High School in the quarterfinals of the regional playoffs 23–6. The next week at national powerhouse Oscar Smith High School, The Bruins magical season came to an end with 39–3 defeat.

In the 2007–2008 school year, the Varsity basketball team welcomed Mbai Goto Olivier, David Keyba Baroum, and Ali Abdou Djim from the war-torn nation of Chad. Before the VHSL season began, all three had committed to Division I-A schools, with Olivier headed to Clemson, Djim to attend Duquesne University, and Baroum to play for La Salle.

The Varsity Basketball team (30–2), coached by Bethel's Dean of Boys Craig Brehon, came up just short of the VHSL state championship title against T.C. Williams High School on March 14.

The Bruins made it to the state finals for the first time in team history in 2008. To basketball's triumph all the way to the state game, and baseball massive run to a state finals, to also the run from the boys track team each led by senior leaders Marcus Cooperwood, Bill Weaver, Kizuku Scott, and Javell Bullard, the 40th anniversary was in 2008.

The Varsity Cheerleading team dominated the Peninsula District Championship, winning the title consecutively from 2007 to 2012. They were named the back to back Peninsula District Champions, Eastern Region Champions, and placed third in the AAA State Competition during the 2008–2009 season.

The Bethel Lady Bruin Tennis Team of 2009/2010 became the first team in the history of the school to win the Eastern District Championship.

== Extracurriculars ==
In 1968, clubs that had been established at BHS included a chess club, a drama club, a chapter of Future Teachers of America, clubs about the Latin and Spanish languages, a pep club, and the "Y-Teens" group.

=== Army JROTC ===
Bethel is also home to the largest and most accomplished Junior ROTC unit in Virginia. The Army JROTC Bruin Battalion has for the past decade fielded the top Marksmanship Team and Raiders Team at any level, and consistently one of the best Drill Teams and Honor guards of Southeast Virginia. As well, the Battalion has achieved some of the highest scores possible during Regional Formal Inspections. These three year inspections test an Army JROTC unit in all areas, and gauge its overall proficiency as a unit.

The Bruin Battalion Marksmanship Team (known locally as "The Rifle Team"), with assistance from Lafayette Gun Club in adjacent York County, has competed in the Old Dominion Junior Rifle League, and has compete nationally twice. The team has sent at least one marksman to a Division 1 NCAA School (Air Force).

=== Professional education ===
Bethel's AJROTC and athletic achievements are supported by a number of programs specifically tailored by the administration toward education in commercial activities. Projects like the FIRM, a large base of business classes, Governor's School opportunities offering college credit, fashion programs, and other such university style programs allow students to pursue a course in high school similar to their expected college major.

=== Mighty Marching Bruins ===
In January 2006, the Bethel Marching Band, better known as the "MMB" (Mighty Marching Bruins), was selected to march in the Governor's Inaugural in Williamsburg, the only band in the district to receive that honor. In addition, the marching band was selected to participate in the 2008 Konica Minolta Gator Bowl halftime show in Jacksonville, Florida, as well as in the 2007 Chick-fil-A Bowl in Atlanta, Georgia. At the 2007 District Band Festival, the Concert Band earned their first Superior rating in over thirty years, and the Symphonic Band earned an Excellent rating, their first in a decade. In May 2007, the Concert and Jazz Bands swept the "Music in the Parks" competition in Cleveland, Ohio, with addition of the best solo played by Becky Paul on Flugelhorn. The 2007 marching band season gave spectators flashbacks of Elvis Presley, Dean Martin, Minnie Riperton, and Tom Jones with a "Las Vegas" themed show. In November 2008, the Superior rated Jazz Combo was hand picked and performed at The Williamsburg Lodge for the Virginia Department of Education. The Bruin Concert Band earned a Superior rating for the second straight year on Wednesday, March 12, 2008. In the year of 2008–09, the Bethel Bruin Band has gone through another season of marching with the theme of Willy Wonka & the Chocolate Factory. The band was successful at getting first place overall for class III in the Granby "Comet Classic" Competition at Old Dominion University, as well as the Landstown High School Marching Competition. The Concert Band participated in the District VIII Band Festival at Woodside High School in Newport News, Virginia on March 12, 2009, and received an 'Excellent' rating. From August 2005 until April 2009, the Bruin Band was under the direction of Mr. Chris Murray. It is now under the direction of Mr. Jerry Lancaster, who has been teaching at Bethel from 2009–present.

In the 2012–2013 school year, the band was awarded its first ever Virginia State Honor Band award, meaning that the band scored a Superior rating in both VBODA State Marching Assessment and District Band Festival with their highest group, the first time ever in school history. In the 2013–2014 school year, they received a Superior rating at VBODA State Marching Assessment with their show, a tribute to "Little Shop of Horrors", and the symphonic band received straight 'Superior' ratings at the District VIII Band Festival, marking the second time in school history that it has received Virginia Honor Band.

== Notable alumni ==
- Harrison Davis, former NFL football player
- Jalani Davis, track and field athlete
- Chris Ellis, practice team member for the Pittsburgh Steelers
- Carl Francis, NFL Players Association Communications Director
- Shaun Gayle, captain of the 1985 Super Bowl Champion Chicago Bears football team.
- Jerry Holmes, former head football Coach at Hampton University
- Brian Hubble, artist
- Allen Iverson, 1997 NBA Rookie of the Year, 2001 NBA Most Valuable Player (MVP), 11-time NBA All-Star, 2-time All-Star Game MVP, 7 All-NBA selections, class of 2016 Basketball Hall of Fame
- Todd Kelly, former NFL football player
- Mike London, former fead football Coach at the University of Virginia
- Francena McCorory, Olympic gold medal winner in the 4 × 400 m relay at the 2012 Summer Olympics in London, and again in Rio de Janeiro during the 2016 Summer Olympics
- Jamel McLean, basketball player who played overseas
- Jeremiah Owusu-Koramoah, professional football player for the Cleveland Browns.
- Ovie Soko, British professional basketball player and Love Island contestant
- Ricky Walker, NFL, CFL, and XFL football player
- Jimmy Williams, former NFL football player
- Nyra Williams, college basketball player
