= 2015–16 NCAA Division I men's basketball season =

Basketball season

- Preseason AP No. 1: North Carolina Tar Heels
- Regular season: November 13, 2015 – March 13, 2016
- NCAA Tournament: 2016
- Tournament dates: March 15 – April 4, 2016
- National Championship: NRG Stadium; Houston, Texas
- NCAA Champions: Villanova Wildcats
- Other champions: George Washington Colonials (NIT), Old Dominion Monarchs (Vegas 16), Nevada Wolf Pack (CBI), Columbia Lions (CIT)
- Player of the Year (Naismith, Wooden): Buddy Hield, Oklahoma Sooners

The 2015–16 NCAA Division I men's basketball season began on November 13. The first early-season tournaments to begin were the Puerto Rico Tip-Off and the Charleston Classic. The season ended with the 2016 NCAA Division I men's basketball tournament, whose Final Four took place at NRG Stadium in Houston, Texas, on April 2, 2016, with the national championship game following on April 4. Practices officially began on October 2, 2015.

== Rule changes ==
The following rule changes were proposed by the NCAA Men's Rules Committee for the 2015–16 season, and officially approved by the NCAA Men's Playing Rules Oversight Panel:

- Reducing the shot clock from 35 to 30 seconds (same as the women's game).
- Providing offensive players the same verticality protections as defensive players.
- Extending the restricted-area arc from 3 feet to 4 feet from the basket.
- Reducing the number of team timeouts from 5 to 4, with a limit of no more than 3 timeouts in the second half.
- Ending the practice of coaches calling timeouts from the bench in live-ball situations.
- Tightening the 10-second backcourt rule, under which the offensive team has 10 seconds to advance the ball from the backcourt to the frontcourt. The following situations, all of which resulted in a reset of the 10-second count under previous rules, no longer reset the count:
  - The defense deflects the ball out of bounds.
  - A held ball situation in the offensive backcourt in which the possession arrow favors the offense.
  - A technical foul against the offensive team during possession in its own backcourt.
- Eliminating the five-second "closely-guarded" rule while the ball is being dribbled.
- Allowing for technical fouls to be called on players who are determined to have faked a foul while reviewing for a flagrant foul.
- Allow video replay of shot-clock violations throughout the game. Previously, this type of review was limited to only the final 2:00 of the game and in overtime.
- "Class B" technical fouls, such as hanging on the rim and delay of game, now result in one free throw by the non-violating team instead of the previous two.
- Requiring that a timeout taken 30 seconds or less before a scheduled media timeout break (which are at 16:00, 12:00, 8:00, and 4:00 of each half) become the media timeout. This particular change had been made in NCAA women's basketball effective with the 2013–14 season.
- Stricter enforcement of resumption of play after timeouts, and reducing from 20 seconds to 15 seconds the time allowed to replace a disqualified (fouled out) player. Teams will receive a delay-of-game warning after the first violation, and a Class B technical foul for each subsequent violation.
- Dunking will be allowed during team warmups and halftime.
- An experimental rule allowing players six personal fouls instead of five will be used in all national postseason tournaments except for the NCAA tournament.

== Season headlines ==
- May 27 – The NCAA announced its Academic Progress Rate (APR) sanctions for the 2015–16 school year. A total of 21 programs in 9 sports were declared ineligible for postseason play due to failure to meet the required APR benchmark, including the following four Division I men's basketball teams:
  - Alcorn State
  - Florida A&M
  - Stetson
  - Central Arkansas
- June 29 – Wisconsin head coach Bo Ryan announced he would retire at the end of the 2015–16 season.
- August 13 – Ryan backed away from his previously announced retirement plans, saying that he was open to staying on beyond this season and that he would make his decision in the coming months.
- September 29 – The NCAA announced penalties against SMU following an investigation into a wide array of violations:
  - The Mustangs were banned from postseason play for 2015–16.
  - Head coach Larry Brown was suspended for nine games.
  - SMU lost nine men's basketball scholarships from 2016–17 through 2018–19. Since the team had only 11 scholarship players for 2015–16, two short of the NCAA limit of 13, the two unused scholarships counted toward the penalty.
  - The men's basketball program was hit with three years' probation.
- October 2 – Yahoo! Sports revealed that the University of Louisville was investigating allegations made in a soon-to-be-published book whose author, a self-described madam, claimed that she had been paid thousands of dollars by former Louisville graduate assistant and director of basketball operations Andre McGee to provide women to dance for and have sex with Cardinals players and recruits.
- November 10 – The Associated Press preseason All-American team was released. Gonzaga forward Kyle Wiltjer was the leading vote-getter (51 votes). Joining him on the team were Iowa State forward Georges Niang (46 votes), Providence guard Kris Dunn (43), Oklahoma guard Buddy Hield (40) and LSU forward Ben Simmons (28).
- December 15 – Bo Ryan announced his retirement after a win against Texas A&M–Corpus Christi, effective immediately, with associate head coach Greg Gard assuming the title of interim head coach.
- December 23 – The NCAA announced penalties against Hawaiʻi for significant violations of NCAA rules:
  - Former head coach Gib Arnold, who had been fired shortly before the 2014–15 season, received a three-year show-cause penalty. An assistant involved in the violations received a two-year show-cause.
  - The Rainbow Warriors were banned from postseason play in 2016–17.
  - The team lost two scholarships in both 2016–17 and 2017–18; it had previously announced a reduction of one scholarship for each of those seasons.
- January 13
  - The NCAA Division I council approved the following changes to its rules regarding declaration for the NBA draft:
    - Declaration for the draft no longer results in automatic loss of college eligibility. As long as a player does not sign a contract with a professional team outside the NBA, or sign with an agent, he will retain college eligibility as long as he makes a timely withdrawal from the draft.
    - NCAA players now have until 10 days after the end of the NBA Draft Combine to withdraw from the draft. For 2016, the withdrawal date was May 25, about five weeks after the previous mid-April deadline.
    - NCAA players may participate in the draft combine, and are also allowed to attend one tryout per year with each NBA team without losing college eligibility.
    - NCAA players may now enter and withdraw from the draft multiple times without loss of eligibility. Previously, the NCAA treated a second declaration of draft eligibility as a permanent loss of college eligibility.
  - Missouri admitted to major NCAA violations dating to 2011. While the NCAA had yet to announce its findings, Missouri voluntarily imposed the following sanctions:
    - The Tigers would not participate in any postseason play this season, including the SEC tournament.
    - All 23 of the Tigers' wins in the 2013–14 season were vacated.
    - The Tigers lost one scholarship in each of the next two seasons, and restrict recruiting in 2016–17.
- February 6
  - Louisville self-imposed a 2016 postseason ban.
- March 10
  - The Ivy League announced that it would institute men's and women's conference tournaments effective with the 2016–17 season. The top four teams in the regular-season standings qualify for each tournament. While the tournament winners receive automatic bids to the NCAA men's and women's tournaments, the official conference champions continue to be determined solely by regular-season results. The inaugural editions were held March 11–12, 2017 at the Palestra in Philadelphia.
- April 8 – The NCAA announced penalties against Southern Miss for a wide array of violations occurring during the tenure of former head coach Donnie Tyndall. The NCAA's findings indicated that mere weeks after Tyndall became head coach, he directed program staffers to complete fraudulent coursework so that several recruits would ostensibly be eligible to play. It was also found that Tyndall had arranged for cash payments to recruits, fabricated documents in an attempt to cover up the payments, and deleted emails relevant to the investigation.
  - Tyndall received a 10-year show-cause, and even after it expires in 2026, he will be suspended for 50% of his next full season as an NCAA coach. Three of his assistants receive 8-year, 7-year, and 6-year penalties. At the time, Tyndall planned to appeal his penalty.
  - The NCAA accepted the school's self-imposed two-year postseason ban, but placed the Golden Eagles on three years' probation. All wins in which ineligible players participated were vacated, and the Golden Eagles lost four scholarships over the next three seasons.

=== Milestones and records ===
- During the season, the following players reached the 2000 career point milestone – Evansville guard D. J. Balentine, High Point forward John Brown, Hofstra guard Juan'ya Green, Louisiana–Lafayette forward Shawn Long, Iowa State forward Georges Niang, Old Dominion guard Trey Freeman, Oklahoma guard Buddy Hield, Stony Brook forward Jameel Warney, Louisville guard Damion Lee, Fresno State guard Marvelle Harris, Army swingman Kyle Wilson. and Iona guard A. J. English.
- November 26 – Michigan State head coach Tom Izzo wins his 500th game.
- November 28 – Davidson head coach Bob McKillop wins his 500th game.
- November 28 – BYU's Kyle Collinsworth records his seventh career triple-double, giving him sole possession of the NCAA record.
- January 26 – Virginia beats Wake Forest on a 9–1 run in the final fifteen seconds, including a buzzer beater three-point bank shot from Darius Thompson, in a comeback highly noted for its statistical improbability.
- February 1 – Duke's streak of 167 appearances in the AP Poll ended as the 5th longest streak of all time.
- February 5 – Yale's Brandon Sherrod, who entered the Bulldogs' game against Columbia one shy of the Division I record of 26 consecutive field goals made, makes his first five field goal attempts in Yale's 86–72 win to set a new record of 30.
- February 8 – The 2015–16 Villanova Wildcats became the program's first team to reach number one in the AP Poll by climbing to the top of the 2015–16 NCAA Division I men's basketball rankings.
- March 16 – In BYU's 97–79 victory over UAB in the first round of the NIT, Collinsworth posts his sixth triple-double of the season, tying his own single-season record from last season and extending his NCAA career record to 12.

== Conference membership changes ==
After a tumultuous four years in which over 80 Division I schools moved to new conferences—some more than once—only two schools joined new conferences as full members for 2015–16:

School	Former conference	New conference
NJIT Highlanders	NCAA Division I independent	Atlantic Sun Conference
Northern Kentucky Norse	Atlantic Sun Conference	Horizon League

Another change in membership involved the Western Athletic Conference (WAC). This did not involve a school moving to a new league, but rather a change in identity of a Division I school. During the summer of 2015, the University of Texas–Pan American (UTPA) and the University of Texas at Brownsville (UTB) merged to form the new University of Texas Rio Grande Valley (UTRGV). The UTPA athletic program was inherited by UTRGV, which retained UTPA's WAC membership.

Following UAB's decision to drop football at the end of the 2014 season, its future membership in Conference USA (C-USA) beyond 2014–15 was initially uncertain, as league bylaws require all member schools to either sponsor FBS football or be committed to establishing an FBS program. Due to ongoing efforts by boosters and other supporters to raise funds to bring UAB football back, C-USA indicated that UAB would be allowed to remain in the league for the 2015–16 season, but not beyond that time unless football was reinstated. On June 1, 2015, UAB initially announced that the football program would be reinstated in 2016, later pushing back the return of football to 2017; this was sufficient to satisfy C-USA, which announced that it would keep UAB as a member.

The 2015–16 season was the last for Coastal Carolina in the Big South Conference. On September 1, 2015, the university and the Sun Belt Conference jointly announced that the Chanticleers would join the Sun Belt in July 2016, initially as a non-football member. The football team will join the Sun Belt in 2017, the second year of its transition from FCS to FBS football.

== New arenas ==
- The Omaha Mavericks left their home since 2012, the off-campus Ralston Arena, for the new on-campus Baxter Arena. The Mavericks' first game in the new arena was on November 13 against the UC Santa Barbara Gauchos, with the Mavericks losing 60–59.
- The Ole Miss Rebels also opened a new arena, but unlike Omaha, the move was from one campus venue to another. Tad Smith Coliseum, home to the Rebels since 1966, was replaced by The Pavilion at Ole Miss. The new arena, with a capacity of 9,500, opened on January 7, with the Rebels defeating Alabama 74–66.

== Season outlook ==
=== Pre–season polls ===
The top 25 from the AP and USA Today Coaches Polls.

AP
Ranking	Team
1	North Carolina
2	Kentucky
3	Maryland
4	Kansas
5	Duke
6	Virginia
7	Iowa State
8	Oklahoma
9	Gonzaga
10	Wichita State
11	Villanova
12	Arizona
13	Michigan State
14	California
15	Indiana
16	Utah
17	Wisconsin
18	Vanderbilt
19	Notre Dame
20	UConn
21	LSU
22	Baylor
23	Purdue
24	Butler
25	Michigan

USA Today Coaches
Ranking	Team
1	Kentucky
1	North Carolina
3	Maryland
4	Duke
5	Kansas
6	Virginia
7	Iowa State
8	Oklahoma
9	Villanova
10	Arizona
11	Gonzaga
12	Wichita State
13	Michigan State
14	California
15	Indiana
16	Utah
17	Wisconsin
18	Notre Dame
19	LSU
20	Vanderbilt
21	Baylor
22	Butler
23	West Virginia
24	UConn
25	Purdue

== Regular season ==
=== Early season tournaments ===
Name	Dates	Location	No. teams	Champion
Puerto Rico Tip-Off	November 19–20, 22	Roberto Clemente Coliseum (San Juan, Puerto Rico)	8	Miami (FL)
Charleston Classic	November 19–20, 22	TD Arena (Charleston, South Carolina)	8	Virginia
2K Sports Classic	November 20, 22	Madison Square Garden (New York City)	4	Duke
Paradise Jam tournament	November 20–23	Sports and Fitness Center (Saint Thomas, VI)	8	South Carolina
Hall of Fame Tip Off	November 21–22	Mohegan Sun Arena (Uncasville, Connecticut)	4	Purdue (Naismith) Buffalo (Springfield)
CBE Hall of Fame Classic	November 23–24	Sprint Center (Kansas City, Missouri)	4	North Carolina
Legends Classic	November 23–24	Barclays Center (Brooklyn, New York)	4	Marquette
Gulf Coast Showcase	November 23–25	Germain Arena (Estero, Florida)	8	Weber State
Maui Invitational	November 23–25	Lahaina Civic Center (Lahaina, HI)	8	Kansas
Men Who Speak Up Main Event	November 23, 25	MGM Grand Garden Arena (Las Vegas)	8	Howard (Middleweight Bracket) Creighton (Heavyweight Bracket)
Cancún Challenge	November 24–25	Moon Palace Golf & Spa Resort (Cancún, MX)	8	South Dakota State (Mayan Division) Maryland (Riviera Division)
Battle 4 Atlantis	November 25–27	Imperial Arena (Nassau, BAH)	8	Syracuse
Great Alaska Shootout	November 25–28	Sullivan Arena (Anchorage, AK)	8	Middle Tennessee
NIT Season Tip-Off	November 26–27	Barclays Center (Brooklyn, New York)	4	Villanova
AdvoCare Invitational	November 26–27, 29	HP Field House (Lake Buena Vista, Florida)	8	Xavier
Wooden Legacy	November 26–27, 29	Anaheim Convention Center (Anaheim, California)	8	Michigan State
Las Vegas Invitational	November 26–27	Orleans Arena (Las Vegas)	4	West Virginia
Barclays Center Classic	November 27–28	Barclays Center (Brooklyn, New York)	4	Cincinnati
Corpus Christi Coastal Classic	November 27–28	American Bank Center (Corpus Christi, Texas)	4	UTEP
Emerald Coast Classic	November 27–28	Emerald Coast Classic Arena (Niceville, Florida)	4	Iowa State
Las Vegas Classic	December 22–23	Orleans Arena (Las Vegas)	4	SMU
Diamond Head Classic	December 22–23, 25	Stan Sheriff Center (Honolulu, HI)	8	Oklahoma

=== Conferences ===
==== Conference winners and tournaments ====
Thirty-one conference regular seasons concluded with a single-elimination tournament. The teams in each conference that won their regular-season titles were given the number one seed in their respective conference tournaments. Conference tournament winners received an automatic bid to the 2016 NCAA Division I men's basketball tournament. For the final time, the Ivy League was the only NCAA Division I conference that did not hold a conference tournament, instead sending its regular-season champion to the NCAA tournament.

Conference	Regular season first place	Conference player of the year	Conference Coach of the Year	Conference tournament	Tournament venue (city)	Tournament winner
America East Conference	Stony Brook	Jameel Warney, Stony Brook	Steve Pikiell, Stony Brook	2016 America East men's basketball tournament	Campus sites	Stony Brook
American Athletic Conference	Temple	Nic Moore, SMU	Fran Dunphy, Temple	2016 American Athletic Conference men's basketball tournament	Amway Center (Orlando, Florida)	UConn
Atlantic 10 Conference	VCU, St. Bonaventure & Dayton (Note: Top seed in conference tournament)	DeAndre’ Bembry, Saint Joseph's	Mark Schmidt, St. Bonaventure	2016 Atlantic 10 men's basketball tournament	Barclays Center (Brooklyn, New York)	Saint Joseph's
Atlantic Coast Conference	North Carolina	Malcolm Brogdon, Virginia	Jim Larrañaga, Miami	2016 ACC men's basketball tournament	Verizon Center (Washington, D.C.)	North Carolina
Atlantic Sun Conference	North Florida	Dallas Moore, North Florida	Matthew Driscoll, North Florida	2016 Atlantic Sun men's basketball tournament	Campus sites	Florida Gulf Coast
Big 12 Conference	Kansas	Buddy Hield, Oklahoma	Tubby Smith, Texas Tech	2016 Big 12 men's basketball tournament	Sprint Center (Kansas City, Missouri)	Kansas
Big East Conference	Villanova	Kris Dunn, Providence	Kevin Willard, Seton Hall & Jay Wright, Villanova	2016 Big East men's basketball tournament	Madison Square Garden (New York City)	Seton Hall
Big Sky Conference	Weber State	Joel Bolomboy, Weber State	Bill Evans, Idaho State	2016 Big Sky Conference men's basketball tournament	Reno Events Center (Reno, Nevada)	Weber State
Big South Conference	High Point & Winthrop	John Brown, High Point	Ritchie McKay, Liberty	2016 Big South Conference men's basketball tournament	Pope Convocation Center (Buies Creek, North Carolina)	UNC Asheville
Big Ten Conference	Indiana	Denzel Valentine, Michigan State	Tom Crean, Indiana	2016 Big Ten Conference men's basketball tournament	Bankers Life Fieldhouse (Indianapolis)	Michigan State
Big West Conference	Hawaii	Stefan Janković, Hawaii	Eran Ganot, Hawaii	2016 Big West Conference men's basketball tournament	Honda Center (Anaheim, California)	Hawaii
Colonial Athletic Association	Hofstra & UNC Wilmington	Juan'ya Green, Hofstra	Kevin Keatts, UNC Wilmington	2016 CAA men's basketball tournament	Royal Farms Arena (Baltimore)	UNC Wilmington
Conference USA	UAB	Alex Hamilton, Louisiana Tech	Jerod Haase, UAB	2016 Conference USA men's basketball tournament	Birmingham–Jefferson Convention Complex (Birmingham, Alabama)	Middle Tennessee
Horizon League	Valparaiso	Kay Felder, Oakland	Bryce Drew, Valparaiso	2016 Horizon League men's basketball tournament	Joe Louis Arena (Detroit)	Green Bay
Ivy League	Yale	Justin Sears, Yale	James Jones, Yale	No tournament		
Metro Atlantic Athletic Conference	Monmouth	Justin Robinson, Monmouth	King Rice, Monmouth	2016 MAAC men's basketball tournament	Times Union Center (Albany, New York)	Iona
Mid-American Conference	Akron (East); Ball State & Central Michigan (West)	Antonio Campbell, Ohio	Keith Dambrot, Akron	2016 Mid-American Conference men's basketball tournament	First round at campus sites Remainder at Quicken Loans Arena (Cleveland, Ohio)	Buffalo
Mid-Eastern Athletic Conference	Hampton	James Daniel III, Howard	Murray Garvin, South Carolina State	2016 MEAC men's basketball tournament	Norfolk Scope (Norfolk, Virginia)	Hampton
Missouri Valley Conference	Wichita State	Fred VanVleet, Wichita State	Barry Hinson, Southern Illinois	2016 Missouri Valley Conference men's basketball tournament	Scottrade Center (St. Louis, Missouri)	Northern Iowa
Mountain West Conference	San Diego State	Marvelle Harris, Fresno State	Steve Fisher, San Diego State	2016 Mountain West Conference men's basketball tournament	Thomas & Mack Center (Paradise, Nevada)	Fresno State
Northeast Conference	Wagner	Cane Broome, Sacred Heart	Bashir Mason, Wagner	2016 Northeast Conference men's basketball tournament	Campus sites	Fairleigh Dickinson
Ohio Valley Conference	Belmont (East); Murray State & Tennessee–Martin (West)	Evan Bradds, Belmont	Dana Ford, Tennessee State	2016 Ohio Valley Conference men's basketball tournament	Nashville Municipal Auditorium (Nashville, Tennessee)	Austin Peay
Pac-12 Conference	Oregon	Jakob Pöltl, Utah	Dana Altman, Oregon	2016 Pac-12 Conference men's basketball tournament	MGM Grand Garden Arena (Paradise, Nevada)	Oregon
Patriot League	Bucknell	Tim Kempton, Lehigh	Nathan Davis, Bucknell	2016 Patriot League men's basketball tournament	Campus sites	Holy Cross
Southeastern Conference	Kentucky & Texas A&M	Tyler Ulis, Kentucky	Billy Kennedy, Texas A&M	2016 SEC men's basketball tournament	Bridgestone Arena (Nashville, Tennessee)	Kentucky
Southern Conference	Chattanooga	Stephen Croone, Furman	Matt McCall, Chattanooga	2016 Southern Conference men's basketball tournament	U.S. Cellular Center (Asheville, North Carolina)	Chattanooga
Southland Conference	Stephen F. Austin	Thomas Walkup, Stephen F. Austin	Brad Underwood, Stephen F. Austin	2016 Southland Conference men's basketball tournament	Leonard E. Merrell Center (Katy, Texas)	Stephen F. Austin
Southwestern Athletic Conference	Texas Southern	Derrick Griffin, Texas Southern	Mike Davis, Texas Southern	2016 SWAC men's basketball tournament	Toyota Center (Houston, Texas)	Southern
The Summit League	IPFW & South Dakota State	Max Landis, IPFW	Jon Coffman, IPFW	2016 Summit League men's basketball tournament	Denny Sanford Premier Center (Sioux Falls, South Dakota)	South Dakota State
Sun Belt Conference	Little Rock	Shawn Long, Louisiana–Lafayette	Chris Beard, Little Rock	2016 Sun Belt Conference men's basketball tournament	Lakefront Arena (New Orleans)	Little Rock
West Coast Conference	Gonzaga & Saint Mary's	Kyle Collinsworth, BYU	Randy Bennett, Saint Mary's	2016 West Coast Conference men's basketball tournament	Orleans Arena (Paradise, Nevada)	Gonzaga
Western Athletic Conference	New Mexico State	Pascal Siakam, New Mexico State	Rod Barnes, Cal State Bakersfield	2016 WAC men's basketball tournament	Orleans Arena (Paradise, Nevada)	Cal State Bakersfield

==== Conference standings ====
2015–16 America East Conference men's basketball standings
	Conf.				Overall
Team	W		L	PCT	W		L	PCT
Stony Brook †	14	–	2	.875	26	–	7	.788
Albany	13	–	3	.813	24	–	9	.727
Vermont	11	–	5	.688	23	–	14	.622
New Hampshire	11	–	5	.688	20	–	13	.606
UMass Lowell*	7	–	9	.438	11	–	18	.379
Binghamton	5	–	11	.313	8	–	22	.267
Hartford	4	–	12	.250	10	–	23	.303
Maine	4	–	12	.250	8	–	22	.267
UMBC	3	–	13	.188	7	–	25	.219
† 2016 America East tournament winner * Ineligible for postseason during transition to Division I.

2015–16 American Athletic Conference men's basketball standings
	Conf.				Overall
Team	W		L	PCT	W		L	PCT
Temple	14	–	4	.778	21	–	12	.636
No. 24 SMU^{*}	13	–	5	.722	25	–	5	.833
Houston	12	–	6	.667	22	–	10	.688
Cincinnati	12	–	6	.667	22	–	11	.667
Tulsa	12	–	6	.667	20	–	12	.625
UConn †	11	–	7	.611	25	–	11	.694
Memphis	8	–	10	.444	19	–	15	.559
UCF	6	–	12	.333	12	–	18	.400
East Carolina	4	–	14	.222	12	–	20	.375
South Florida	4	–	14	.222	8	–	25	.242
Tulane	3	–	15	.167	12	–	22	.353
^{*} Ineligible for postseason due to postseason ban † American Athletic Conference tournament Champions; Rankings from AP poll

2015–16 Atlantic 10 men's basketball standings
	Conf.				Overall
Team	W		L	PCT	W		L	PCT
Dayton	14	–	4	.778	25	–	8	.758
VCU	14	–	4	.778	25	–	11	.694
St. Bonaventure	14	–	4	.778	22	–	9	.710
Saint Joseph's †	13	–	5	.722	28	–	8	.778
George Washington	11	–	7	.611	28	–	10	.737
Davidson	10	–	8	.556	20	–	13	.606
Rhode Island	9	–	9	.500	17	–	15	.531
Fordham	8	–	10	.444	17	–	14	.548
Richmond	7	–	11	.389	16	–	16	.500
UMass	6	–	12	.333	14	–	18	.438
Duquesne	6	–	12	.333	17	–	17	.500
George Mason	5	–	13	.278	11	–	21	.344
Saint Louis	5	–	13	.278	11	–	21	.344
La Salle	4	–	14	.222	9	–	22	.290
† 2016 A10 Tournament winner

2015–16 ACC men's basketball standings
	Conf.				Overall
Team	W		L	PCT	W		L	PCT
No. 3 North Carolina †	14	–	4	.778	33	–	7	.825
No. 4 Virginia	13	–	5	.722	29	–	8	.784
No. 10 Miami (FL)	13	–	5	.722	27	–	8	.771
No. 16 Louisville*	12	–	6	.667	23	–	8	.742
Notre Dame	11	–	7	.611	24	–	12	.667
No. 19 Duke	11	–	7	.611	25	–	11	.694
Virginia Tech	10	–	8	.556	20	–	15	.571
Clemson	10	–	8	.556	17	–	14	.548
Pittsburgh	9	–	9	.500	21	–	12	.636
Syracuse	9	–	9	.500	23	–	14	.622
Georgia Tech	8	–	10	.444	21	–	15	.583
Florida State	8	–	10	.444	20	–	14	.588
NC State	5	–	13	.278	16	–	17	.485
Wake Forest	2	–	16	.111	11	–	20	.355
Boston College	0	–	18	.000	7	–	25	.219
† 2016 ACC tournament winner * Ineligible for both the 2016 ACC tournament and the 2016 NCAA tournament due to self-imposed postseason ban. Rankings from AP poll

2015–16 Atlantic Sun men's basketball standings
	Conf.				Overall
Team	W		L	PCT	W		L	PCT
North Florida	10	–	4	.714	22	–	12	.647
NJIT	8	–	6	.571	20	–	15	.571
Jacksonville	8	–	6	.571	16	–	16	.500
Florida Gulf Coast †	8	–	6	.571	21	–	14	.600
Kennesaw State	7	–	7	.500	11	–	20	.355
Lipscomb	7	–	7	.500	12	–	21	.364
Stetson*	4	–	10	.286	12	–	22	.353
USC Upstate	4	–	10	.286	10	–	22	.313
† 2016 Atlantic Sun Tournament winner *ineligible for the 2016 NCAA tournament due to APR violations

2015–16 Big East men's basketball standings
	Conf.				Overall
Team	W		L	PCT	W		L	PCT
No. 6 Villanova	16	–	2	.889	35	–	5	.875
No. 9 Xavier	14	–	4	.778	28	–	5	.848
No. 20 Seton Hall †	12	–	6	.667	25	–	9	.735
Providence	10	–	8	.556	24	–	11	.686
Butler	10	–	8	.556	22	–	11	.667
Creighton	9	–	9	.500	20	–	15	.571
Marquette	8	–	10	.444	20	–	13	.606
Georgetown	7	–	11	.389	15	–	18	.455
DePaul	3	–	15	.167	9	–	22	.290
St. John's	1	–	17	.056	8	–	24	.250
† 2016 Big East tournament winner Rankings from AP poll

2015–16 Big Sky men's basketball standings
	Conf.				Overall
Team	W		L	PCT	W		L	PCT
Weber State †	15	–	3	.833	26	–	9	.743
Montana	14	–	4	.778	21	–	12	.636
Idaho	12	–	6	.667	21	–	13	.618
Idaho State	11	–	7	.611	16	–	15	.516
Eastern Washington	10	–	8	.556	18	–	16	.529
North Dakota	10	–	8	.556	17	–	16	.515
Montana State	9	–	9	.500	14	–	17	.452
Portland State	8	–	10	.444	13	–	18	.419
Northern Colorado	7	–	11	.389	10	–	21	.323
Sacramento State	6	–	12	.333	14	–	17	.452
Northern Arizona	3	–	15	.167	5	–	25	.167
Southern Utah	3	–	15	.167	5	–	24	.172
† Conference tournament winner

2015–16 Big South men's basketball standings
	Conf.				Overall
Team	W		L	PCT	W		L	PCT
Winthrop	13	–	5	.722	23	–	9	.719
High Point	13	–	5	.722	21	–	11	.656
UNC Asheville †	12	–	6	.667	22	–	12	.647
Coastal Carolina	12	–	6	.667	21	–	12	.636
Gardner–Webb	10	–	8	.556	17	–	16	.515
Liberty	10	–	8	.556	13	–	19	.406
Radford	9	–	9	.500	16	–	15	.516
Campbell	5	–	13	.278	12	–	18	.400
Presbyterian	5	–	13	.278	11	–	20	.355
Longwood	5	–	13	.278	10	–	23	.303
Charleston Southern	5	–	13	.278	9	–	21	.300
† 2016 Big South tournament winner

2015–16 Big Ten Conference men's basketball standings
	Conf.				Overall
Team	W		L	PCT	W		L	PCT
No. 14 Indiana	15	–	3	.833	27	–	8	.771
No. 2 Michigan State †	13	–	5	.722	29	–	6	.829
No. 18 Maryland	12	–	6	.667	27	–	9	.750
No. 12 Purdue	12	–	6	.667	26	–	9	.743
No. 25 Iowa	12	–	6	.667	22	–	11	.667
Wisconsin	12	–	6	.667	22	–	13	.629
Ohio State	11	–	7	.611	21	–	14	.600
Michigan	10	–	8	.556	23	–	13	.639
Northwestern	8	–	10	.444	20	–	12	.625
Penn State	7	–	11	.389	16	–	16	.500
Nebraska	6	–	12	.333	16	–	18	.471
Illinois	5	–	13	.278	15	–	19	.441
Minnesota	2	–	16	.111	11	–	20	.355
Rutgers	1	–	17	.056	7	–	25	.219
† 2016 Big Ten tournament winner Rankings from AP poll

2015–16 Big 12 men's basketball standings
	Conf.				Overall
Team	W		L	PCT	W		L	PCT
No. 1 Kansas †	15	–	3	.833	33	–	5	.868
No. 8 West Virginia	13	–	5	.722	26	–	9	.743
No. 7 Oklahoma	12	–	6	.667	29	–	8	.784
Texas	11	–	7	.611	20	–	13	.606
No. 21 Baylor	10	–	8	.556	22	–	12	.647
No. 22 Iowa State	10	–	8	.556	23	–	12	.657
Texas Tech	9	–	9	.500	19	–	13	.594
Kansas State	5	–	13	.278	17	–	16	.515
Oklahoma State	3	–	15	.167	12	–	20	.375
TCU	2	–	16	.111	12	–	21	.364
† 2016 Big 12 Tournament winner Rankings from AP poll

2015–16 Big West men's basketball standings
	Conf.				Overall
Team	W		L	PCT	W		L	PCT
Hawai'i †	13	–	3	.813	28	–	6	.824
UC Irvine	13	–	3	.813	28	–	10	.737
Long Beach State	12	–	4	.750	20	–	15	.571
UC Santa Barbara	11	–	5	.688	19	–	14	.576
UC Davis	6	–	10	.375	11	–	19	.367
UC Riverside	5	–	11	.313	14	–	19	.424
Cal State Northridge*	5	–	11	.313	10	–	20	.333
Cal Poly	4	–	12	.250	10	–	20	.333
Cal State Fullerton	3	–	13	.188	10	–	20	.333
† 2016 Big West tournament winner *ineligible for postseason due to self-imposed ban due to academic fraud violations

2015–16 CAA men's basketball standings
	Conf.				Overall
Team	W		L	PCT	W		L	PCT
Hofstra	14	–	4	.778	24	–	10	.706
UNC Wilmington †	14	–	4	.778	25	–	8	.758
Towson	11	–	7	.611	20	–	13	.606
James Madison	11	–	7	.611	21	–	11	.656
William & Mary	11	–	7	.611	20	–	11	.645
Northeastern	9	–	9	.500	18	–	15	.545
College of Charleston	8	–	10	.444	17	–	14	.548
Elon	7	–	11	.389	16	–	16	.500
Drexel	3	–	15	.167	6	–	25	.194
Delaware	2	–	16	.111	7	–	23	.233
† 2016 CAA tournament winner

2015–16 Conference USA men's basketball standings
	Conf.				Overall
Team	W		L	PCT	W		L	PCT
UAB	16	–	2	.889	26	–	7	.788
Middle Tennessee †	13	–	5	.722	25	–	10	.714
Marshall	12	–	6	.667	17	–	16	.515
Louisiana Tech	12	–	6	.667	23	–	10	.697
Old Dominion	12	–	6	.667	25	–	13	.658
UTEP	10	–	8	.556	19	–	14	.576
Charlotte	9	–	9	.500	14	–	19	.424
Western Kentucky	8	–	10	.444	18	–	16	.529
North Texas	7	–	11	.389	12	–	20	.375
Rice	7	–	11	.389	12	–	20	.375
FIU	7	–	11	.389	13	–	19	.406
Florida Atlantic	5	–	13	.278	8	–	25	.242
Southern Miss*	5	–	13	.278	8	–	21	.276
UTSA	3	–	15	.167	5	–	27	.156
† 2016 C-USA Tournament winner *Ineligible for postseason play due to self-imposed postseason ban.

2015–16 Horizon League men's basketball standings
	Conf.				Overall
Team	W		L	PCT	W		L	PCT
Valparaiso	16	–	2	.889	30	–	7	.811
Oakland	13	–	5	.722	23	–	12	.657
Wright State	13	–	5	.722	22	–	13	.629
Green Bay †	11	–	7	.611	23	–	13	.639
Milwaukee	10	–	8	.556	20	–	13	.606
Detroit	9	–	9	.500	16	–	15	.516
Youngstown State	6	–	12	.333	11	–	21	.344
Northern Kentucky*	5	–	13	.278	9	–	21	.300
Cleveland State	4	–	14	.222	9	–	23	.281
UIC	3	–	15	.167	5	–	25	.167
† 2016 Horizon League Tournament winner * Ineligible for NCAA postseason during transition to Division I.

2015–16 Ivy League men's basketball standings
	Conf.				Overall
Team	W		L	PCT	W		L	PCT
x-Yale †	13	–	1	.929	23	–	7	.767
Princeton	12	–	2	.857	22	–	7	.759
Columbia	10	–	4	.714	25	–	10	.714
Harvard	6	–	8	.429	14	–	16	.467
Penn	5	–	9	.357	11	–	17	.393
Dartmouth	4	–	10	.286	10	–	18	.357
Cornell	3	–	11	.214	10	–	18	.357
Brown	3	–	11	.214	8	–	20	.286
x – Ivy League champions † – NCAA Tournament participant

2015–16 MAAC men's basketball standings
	Conf.				Overall
Team	W		L	PCT	W		L	PCT
Monmouth	17	–	3	.850	28	–	8	.778
Iona †	16	–	4	.800	22	–	11	.667
Siena	13	–	7	.650	21	–	13	.618
Fairfield	12	–	8	.600	19	–	14	.576
Saint Peter's	12	–	8	.600	14	–	16	.467
Manhattan	9	–	11	.450	13	–	18	.419
Canisius	8	–	12	.400	14	–	19	.424
Rider	8	–	12	.400	13	–	20	.394
Quinnipiac	6	–	14	.300	9	–	21	.300
Niagara	5	–	15	.250	7	–	25	.219
Marist	4	–	16	.200	7	–	23	.233
† 2016 MAAC tournament winner

2015–16 Mid-American Conference men's basketball standings
	Conf.				Overall
Team	W		L	PCT	W		L	PCT
East
Akron	13	–	5	.722	26	–	9	.743
Ohio	11	–	7	.611	23	–	12	.657
Kent State	10	–	8	.556	19	–	13	.594
Buffalo †	10	–	8	.556	20	–	15	.571
Miami (OH)	6	–	12	.333	13	–	20	.394
Bowling Green	5	–	13	.278	16	–	18	.471
West
Ball State	10	–	8	.556	21	–	14	.600
Central Michigan	10	–	8	.556	17	–	16	.515
Northern Illinois	9	–	9	.500	21	–	13	.618
Eastern Michigan	9	–	9	.500	18	–	15	.545
Toledo	8	–	10	.444	17	–	15	.531
Western Michigan	7	–	11	.389	13	–	19	.406
† 2016 MAC tournament winner

2015–16 MEAC men's basketball standings
	Conf.				Overall
Team	W		L	PCT	W		L	PCT
Hampton †	13	–	3	.813	21	–	11	.656
South Carolina State	12	–	4	.750	19	–	15	.559
Norfolk State	12	–	4	.750	17	–	17	.500
Bethune–Cookman	10	–	6	.625	14	–	18	.438
Savannah State	9	–	7	.563	16	–	16	.500
North Carolina Central	7	–	9	.438	13	–	19	.406
North Carolina A&T	7	–	9	.438	10	–	22	.313
Md. Eastern Shore	7	–	9	.438	10	–	22	.313
Howard	6	–	10	.375	12	–	20	.375
Morgan State	6	–	10	.375	9	–	22	.290
Coppin State	6	–	10	.375	9	–	22	.290
Delaware State	5	–	11	.313	7	–	25	.219
Florida A&M*	4	–	12	.250	8	–	21	.276
† 2016 MEAC tournament winner *ineligible for postseason due to APR violations As of March 18, 2016

2015–16 Missouri Valley Conference men's basketball standings
	Conf.				Overall
Team	W		L	PCT	W		L	PCT
Wichita State	16	–	2	.889	26	–	9	.743
Evansville	12	–	6	.667	25	–	9	.735
Illinois State	12	–	6	.667	18	–	14	.563
Southern Illinois	11	–	7	.611	22	–	10	.688
Northern Iowa †	11	–	7	.611	23	–	13	.639
Indiana State	8	–	10	.444	15	–	17	.469
Missouri State	8	–	10	.444	13	–	19	.406
Loyola Chicago	7	–	11	.389	15	–	17	.469
Bradley	3	–	15	.167	5	–	27	.156
Drake	2	–	16	.111	7	–	24	.226
† 2016 MVC tournament winner

2015–16 Mountain West Conference men's basketball standings
	Conf.				Overall
Team	W		L	PCT	W		L	PCT
San Diego State	16	–	2	.889	28	–	10	.737
Fresno State †	13	–	5	.722	25	–	10	.714
Boise State	11	–	7	.611	20	–	12	.625
Nevada	10	–	8	.556	24	–	14	.632
New Mexico	10	–	8	.556	17	–	15	.531
Colorado State	8	–	10	.444	18	–	16	.529
UNLV	8	–	10	.444	18	–	15	.545
Utah State	7	–	11	.389	16	–	15	.516
Wyoming	7	–	11	.389	14	–	18	.438
Air Force	5	–	13	.278	14	–	18	.438
San Jose State	4	–	14	.222	9	–	22	.290
† Conference tournament winner

2015–16 Northeast Conference men's basketball standings
	Conf.				Overall
Team	W		L	PCT	W		L	PCT
Wagner	13	–	5	.722	23	–	11	.676
Fairleigh Dickinson †	11	–	7	.611	18	–	15	.545
Sacred Heart	11	–	7	.611	12	–	18	.400
St. Francis Brooklyn	11	–	7	.611	15	–	17	.469
Mount St. Mary's	10	–	8	.556	14	–	19	.424
LIU Brooklyn	9	–	9	.500	16	–	15	.516
Saint Francis	9	–	9	.500	13	–	17	.433
Robert Morris	8	–	10	.444	10	–	22	.313
Bryant	5	–	13	.278	8	–	23	.258
Central Connecticut	3	–	15	.167	4	–	25	.138
† 2016 NEC tournament winner

2015–16 Ohio Valley Conference men's basketball standings
	Conf.				Overall
Team	W		L	PCT	W		L	PCT
East
Belmont	12	–	4	.750	20	–	12	.625
Tennessee State	11	–	5	.688	20	–	11	.645
Tennessee Tech	11	–	5	.688	19	–	12	.613
Morehead State	11	–	5	.688	23	–	14	.622
Eastern Kentucky	6	–	10	.375	15	–	16	.484
Jacksonville State	4	–	12	.250	8	–	23	.258
West
UT Martin	10	–	6	.625	20	–	15	.571
Murray State	10	–	6	.625	17	–	14	.548
Eastern Illinois	9	–	7	.563	13	–	17	.433
Austin Peay †	7	–	9	.438	18	–	18	.500
SIU Edwardsville	3	–	13	.188	6	–	22	.214
Southeast Missouri St.	2	–	14	.125	5	–	24	.172
† 2016 OVC tournament winner

2015–16 Pac-12 Conference men's basketball standings
	Conf.				Overall
Team	W		L	PCT	W		L	PCT
No. 5 Oregon †	14	–	4	.778	31	–	7	.816
No. 13 Utah	13	–	5	.722	27	–	9	.750
No. 17 Arizona	12	–	6	.667	25	–	9	.735
No. 23 California	12	–	6	.667	23	–	11	.676
Colorado	10	–	8	.556	22	–	12	.647
USC	9	–	9	.500	21	–	13	.618
Oregon State	9	–	9	.500	19	–	13	.594
Washington	9	–	9	.500	19	–	15	.559
Stanford	8	–	10	.444	15	–	15	.500
UCLA	6	–	12	.333	15	–	17	.469
Arizona State	5	–	13	.278	15	–	17	.469
Washington State	1	–	17	.056	9	–	22	.290
† Pac-12 Tournament winner Rankings from AP poll

2015–16 Patriot League men's basketball standings
	Conf.				Overall
Team	W		L	PCT	W		L	PCT
Bucknell	14	–	4	.778	17	–	14	.548
Lehigh	13	–	5	.722	17	–	15	.531
Boston University	11	–	7	.611	19	–	15	.559
Army	9	–	9	.500	19	–	14	.576
Navy	9	–	9	.500	19	–	14	.576
Colgate	9	–	9	.500	13	–	17	.433
American	9	–	9	.500	12	–	19	.387
Loyola (MD)	8	–	10	.444	9	–	21	.300
Holy Cross †	5	–	13	.278	15	–	20	.429
Lafayette	3	–	15	.167	6	–	24	.200
† 2016 Patriot League tournament winner

2015–16 Southeastern Conference men's basketball standings
	Conf.				Overall
Team	W		L	PCT	W		L	PCT
No. 15 Texas A&M	13	–	5	.722	28	–	9	.757
No. 10 Kentucky †	13	–	5	.722	27	–	9	.750
South Carolina	11	–	7	.611	25	–	9	.735
Vanderbilt	11	–	7	.611	19	–	14	.576
LSU	11	–	7	.611	19	–	14	.576
Ole Miss	10	–	8	.556	20	–	12	.625
Georgia	10	–	8	.556	20	–	14	.588
Florida	9	–	9	.500	21	–	15	.583
Arkansas	9	–	9	.500	16	–	16	.500
Alabama	8	–	10	.444	18	–	15	.545
Mississippi State	7	–	11	.389	14	–	17	.452
Tennessee	6	–	12	.333	15	–	19	.441
Auburn	5	–	13	.278	11	–	20	.355
Missouri^{*}	3	–	15	.167	10	–	21	.323
† 2016 SEC tournament winner^{*}Ineligible for postseason play due to self-imposed postseason ban. Rankings from AP poll

2015–16 Southern Conference men's basketball standings
	Conf.				Overall
Team	W		L	PCT	W		L	PCT
Chattanooga †	15	–	3	.833	29	–	6	.829
East Tennessee State	14	–	4	.778	24	–	12	.667
Furman	11	–	7	.611	19	–	16	.543
Wofford	11	–	7	.611	15	–	17	.469
Western Carolina	10	–	8	.556	16	–	18	.471
UNC Greensboro	10	–	8	.556	15	–	19	.441
Mercer	8	–	10	.444	19	–	15	.559
Samford	4	–	14	.222	14	–	19	.424
VMI	4	–	14	.222	9	–	21	.300
The Citadel	3	–	15	.167	10	–	22	.313
† 2016 SoCon Tournament winner

2015–16 Southland Conference men's basketball standings
	Conf.				Overall
Team	W		L	PCT	W		L	PCT
Stephen F. Austin †	18	–	0	1.000	28	–	6	.824
Texas A&M–CC	15	–	3	.833	25	–	8	.758
Sam Houston State	12	–	6	.667	18	–	16	.529
Incarnate Word*	12	–	6	.667	17	–	12	.586
Houston Baptist	10	–	8	.556	17	–	17	.500
Southeastern Louisiana	9	–	9	.500	12	–	21	.364
Abilene Christian*	8	–	10	.444	13	–	18	.419
McNeese State	7	–	11	.389	9	–	20	.310
Central Arkansas**	6	–	12	.333	7	–	21	.250
New Orleans	6	–	12	.333	10	–	20	.333
Nicholls State	6	–	12	.333	11	–	23	.324
Northwestern State	5	–	13	.278	8	–	20	.286
Lamar	3	–	15	.167	11	–	19	.367
† 2016 Southland tournament winner * Ineligible for postseason during transition to Division I ** Ineligible for postseason due to APR violations

2015–16 SWAC men's basketball standings
	Conf.				Overall
Team	W		L	PCT	W		L	PCT
Texas Southern	16	–	2	.889	18	–	15	.545
Alcorn State*	13	–	5	.722	15	–	15	.500
Jackson State	12	–	6	.667	20	–	16	.556
Southern †	11	–	7	.611	22	–	13	.629
Alabama State	9	–	9	.500	14	–	17	.452
Prairie View A&M	7	–	11	.389	7	–	24	.226
Alabama A&M	6	–	12	.333	11	–	18	.379
Arkansas–Pine Bluff	6	–	12	.333	8	–	25	.242
Mississippi Valley State	6	–	12	.333	8	–	27	.229
Grambling State	4	–	14	.222	7	–	24	.226
† 2016 SWAC tournament winner *ineligible for postseason due to APR violations

2015–16 Summit League men's basketball standings
	Conf.				Overall
Team	W		L	PCT	W		L	PCT
IPFW	12	–	4	.750	24	–	10	.706
South Dakota State †	12	–	4	.750	26	–	8	.765
Omaha	10	–	6	.625	18	–	14	.563
IUPUI	9	–	7	.563	13	–	19	.406
North Dakota State	8	–	8	.500	20	–	13	.606
Denver	7	–	9	.438	16	–	15	.516
Oral Roberts	6	–	10	.375	14	–	17	.452
South Dakota	5	–	11	.313	14	–	18	.438
Western Illinois	3	–	13	.188	10	–	17	.370
† 2016 Summit League Tournament winner

2015–16 Sun Belt Conference men's basketball standings
	Conf.				Overall
Team	W		L	PCT	W		L	PCT
Little Rock †	17	–	3	.850	30	–	5	.857
Louisiana–Monroe	15	–	5	.750	20	–	14	.588
Texas–Arlington	13	–	7	.650	24	–	11	.686
Louisiana–Lafayette	12	–	8	.600	19	–	15	.559
Georgia Southern	10	–	10	.500	14	–	17	.452
Georgia State	9	–	11	.450	16	–	14	.533
Texas State	8	–	12	.400	15	–	16	.484
South Alabama	8	–	12	.400	14	–	19	.424
Arkansas State	7	–	13	.350	11	–	20	.355
Appalachian State	7	–	13	.350	9	–	22	.290
Troy	4	–	16	.200	9	–	22	.290
† 2016 Sun Belt Conference tournament winner

2015–16 West Coast Conference men's basketball standings
	Conf.				Overall
Team	W		L	PCT	W		L	PCT
Saint Mary's	15	–	3	.833	29	–	6	.829
Gonzaga †	15	–	3	.833	28	–	8	.778
BYU	13	–	5	.722	26	–	11	.703
Pepperdine	10	–	8	.556	18	–	14	.563
San Francisco	8	–	10	.444	15	–	15	.500
Santa Clara	7	–	11	.389	11	–	20	.355
Portland	6	–	12	.333	12	–	20	.375
Loyola Marymount	6	–	12	.333	14	–	17	.452
Pacific*	6	–	12	.333	8	–	20	.286
San Diego	4	–	14	.222	9	–	21	.300
† Conference tournament winner *ineligible for postseason due to self probation

2015–16 WAC men's basketball standings
	Conf.				Overall
Team	W		L	PCT	W		L	PCT
New Mexico State	13	–	1	.929	23	–	11	.676
Grand Canyon *	11	–	3	.786	27	–	7	.794
Cal State Bakersfield †	11	–	3	.786	24	–	9	.727
Seattle	7	–	7	.500	15	–	17	.469
Utah Valley	6	–	8	.429	12	–	18	.400
UMKC	4	–	10	.286	12	–	19	.387
Texas–Rio Grande Valley	4	–	10	.286	8	–	22	.267
Chicago State	0	–	14	.000	4	–	28	.125
† 2016 WAC tournament winner * Ineligible for postseason during transition to Division I.

=== Informal championships ===
Conference	Regular season winner	Most Valuable Player
Philadelphia Big 5	Villanova	DeAndre' Bembry, Saint Joseph's

Villanova finished with a 4–0 record in head-to-head competition among the Philadelphia Big 5.

=== Statistical leaders ===
Source for additional stats categories

Points per game			Rebounds per game			Assists per game			Steals per game		
Player	School	PPG	Player	School	RPG	Player	School	APG	Player	School	SPG
James Daniel III	Howard	27.1	Egidijus Mockevičius	Evansville	14.0	Kay Felder	Oakland	9.3	Tra-Deon Hollins	Omaha	4.0
Buddy Hield	Oklahoma	25.0	Rokas Gustys	Hofstra	13.0	Jordan Johnson	Milwaukee	8.1	Hameed Ali	Texas A&M–CC	2.7
Josh Adams	Wyoming	24.7	Joel Bolomboy	Weber State	12.6	Jaaron Simmons	Ohio	7.9	Carrington Love	Green Bay	2.6
Kay Felder	Oakland	24.4	Shawn Long	LA-Lafayette	12.1	Denzel Valentine	Michigan State	7.8	Gary Payton II	Oregon State	2.5
Stefan Moody	Ole Miss	23.6	Chris Horton	Austin Peay	12.0	Kyle Collinsworth	BYU	7.4	Kris Dunn	Providence	2.5

Blocked shots per game			Field goal percentage			Three-point field goal percentage			Free throw percentage		
Player	School	BPG	Player	School	FG%	Player	School	3FG%	Player	School	FT%
Vashil Fernandez	Valparaiso	3.3	Evan Bradds	Belmont	71.4	Giddy Potts	Middle Tennessee	50.6	Fletcher Magee	Wofford	92.5
Tai Odiase	UIC	3.2	Venky Jois	Eastern Washington	67.9	Bryn Forbes	Michigan State	48.1	Ben Millaud-Meunier	St. Francis (PA)	91.0
Jameel Warney	Stony Brook	3.0	Derrick Griffin	Texas Southern	66.2	Fletcher Magee	Wofford	47.9	Q. J. Peterson	VMI	90.5
Laron Smith	Bethune–Cookman	3.0	Rokas Gustys	Hofstra	66.0	Matt Donlan	Youngstown State	46.3	Sam Hunt	NC A&T	90.4
Luke Kornet	Vanderbilt	3.0	Adrian Diaz	FIU	65.0	Trent Mackey	North Florida	46.0	Jaleen Smith	New Hampshire	90.0

== Postseason ==
=== NCAA tournament ===
==== Tournament upsets ====
For this list, a "major upset" is defined as a win by a team seeded 7 or more spots below its defeated opponent.

Date	Winner	Score	Loser	Region	Round
March 17	Yale (12)	79–75	Baylor (5)	West	Round of 64
March 17	Little Rock (12)	85–83 (2OT)	Purdue (5)	Midwest	Round of 64
March 18	Hawaii (13)	77–66	California (4)	South	Round of 64
March 18	Middle Tennessee (15)	90–81	Michigan State (2)	Midwest	Round of 64
March 18	Stephen F. Austin (14)	70–56	West Virginia (3)	East	Round of 64
March 19	Gonzaga (11)	82–59	Utah (3)	Midwest	Round of 32
March 27	Syracuse (10)	68–62	Virginia (1)	Midwest	Elite 8

Final Four – NRG Stadium, Houston, Texas

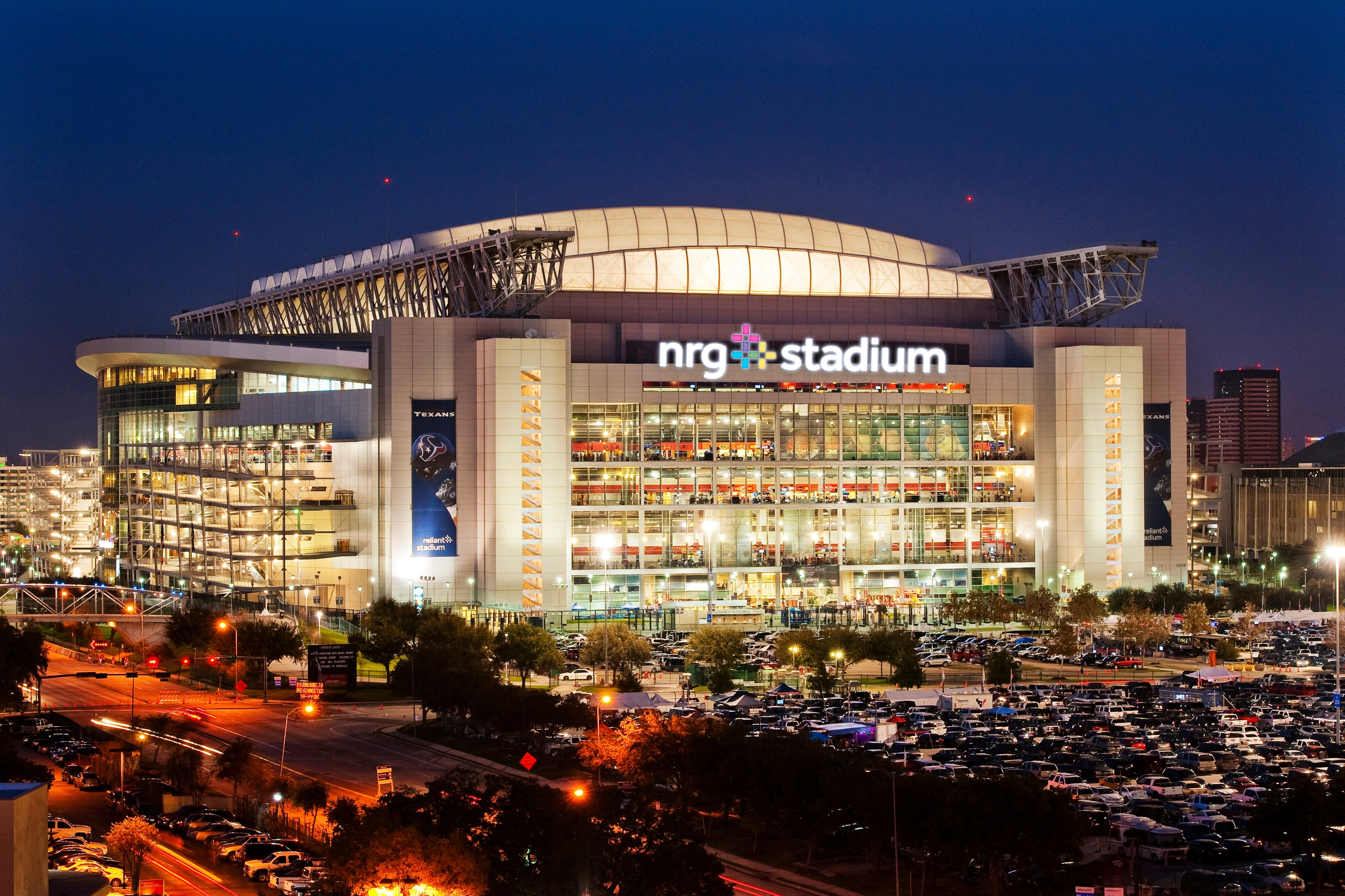
NRG Stadium in Houston, Texas, hosted the NCAA men's Final Four.

National Semifinals; April 2
2 (W)	Oklahoma	51
2 (S)	Villanova	95
1 (E)	North Carolina	83
10 (MW)	Syracuse	66

National Championship game Apr 4
2 (S)	Villanova	77
1 (E)	North Carolina	74

=== National Invitation tournament ===
After the NCAA tournament field was announced, the NCAA invited 32 teams to participate in the National Invitation Tournament. The tournament began on March 15, 2016 with all games prior to the semifinals were played on campus sites.

==== NIT Semifinals and Final ====
Played at Madison Square Garden in New York City on March 29 and 31

The semifinals and final were held on March 29 and March 31 at Madison Square Garden in New York City.

Semifinals; March 29
1	Valparaiso	72
2	BYU	70
4	George Washington	65
2	San Diego State	46

Championship game March 31
1	Valparaiso	60
4	George Washington	76

=== Vegas 16 tournament ===
After the NCAA tournament field was announced, eight teams were invited to participate in the first-ever Vegas 16 Tournament. The tournament began on March 28, 2016, with all eight teams playing in the opening round. The semifinals was played on March 29, and the championship game on March 30. All games were played at Mandalay Bay Events Center in Las Vegas, Nevada. The Vegas 16 Tournament was never held again.

Semifinals; March 29
Old Dominion	64
UC Santa Barbara	49
Oakland	104
East Tennessee State	81

Championship game March 30
Old Dominion	68
Oakland	67

=== College Basketball Invitational ===
The ninth College Basketball Invitational (CBI) Tournament began on March 15, 2016. This tournament featured 16 teams who were left out of the NCAA tournament and NIT.

Semifinals; March 23
Morehead State	77
Ohio	72
Nevada	86
Vermont	72

Championship Series; March 28, April 1
Morehead State	86	68	82
Nevada	83	77	85*

=== CollegeInsider.com Postseason tournament ===
The eighth CollegeInsider.com Postseason Tournament began on March 14 and ended with that championship game on March 29. This tournament places an emphasis on selecting successful teams from "mid-major" conferences who were left out of the NCAA tournament and NIT. 26 teams participated in this tournament.

Semifinals; March 27
NJIT	65
Columbia	80
UC Irvine	66
Coastal Carolina	47

Championship; March 29
Columbia	73
UC Irvine	67

== Award winners ==
=== Consensus All-American teams ===
The following players are recognized as the 2016 Consensus All-Americans:

Consensus First Team
Player	Position	Class	Team
Malcolm Brogdon	SG	Senior	Virginia
Buddy Hield	SG	Senior	Oklahoma
Brice Johnson	PF	Senior	North Carolina
Ben Simmons	F	Freshman	Louisiana State
Tyler Ulis	PG	Sophomore	Kentucky
Denzel Valentine	SG	Senior	Michigan State

Consensus Second Team
Player	Position	Class	Team
Kris Dunn	PG	Junior	Providence
Perry Ellis	PF	Senior	Kansas
Georges Niang	PF/SF	Senior	Iowa State
Jakob Pöltl	C	Sophomore	Utah
Jarrod Uthoff	PF	Senior	Iowa

=== Major player of the year awards ===
- Wooden Award: Buddy Hield, Oklahoma
- Naismith Award: Buddy Hield, Oklahoma
- Associated Press Player of the Year: Denzel Valentine, Michigan State
- NABC Player of the Year: Denzel Valentine, Michigan State
- Oscar Robertson Trophy (USBWA): Buddy Hield, Oklahoma
- Sporting News Player of the Year: Buddy Hield, Oklahoma

=== Major freshman of the year awards ===
- Wayman Tisdale Award (USBWA): Ben Simmons, LSU

=== Major coach of the year awards ===
- Associated Press Coach of the Year: Bill Self, Kansas
- Henry Iba Award (USBWA): Chris Mack, Xavier
- NABC Coach of the Year: Bill Self, Kansas
- Naismith College Coach of the Year: Jay Wright, Villanova
- Sporting News Coach of the Year: Tubby Smith, Texas Tech

=== Other major awards ===
- Bob Cousy Award (Best point guard): Tyler Ulis, Kentucky
- Jerry West Award (Best shooting guard): Buddy Hield, Oklahoma
- Julius Erving Award (Best small forward): Denzel Valentine, Michigan State
- Karl Malone Award (Best power forward): Georges Niang, Iowa State
- Kareem Abdul-Jabbar Award (Best center): Jakob Pöltl, Utah
- Pete Newell Big Man Award (Best big man): Jakob Pöltl, Utah
- NABC Defensive Player of the Year: Malcolm Brogdon, Virginia
- Senior CLASS Award (top senior): Denzel Valentine, Michigan State
- Robert V. Geasey Trophy (Top player in Philadelphia Big 5): DeAndre' Bembry, Saint Joseph's
- Haggerty Award (Top player in New York City metro area): Isaiah Whitehead, Seton Hall
- Ben Jobe Award (Top minority coach): Dana Ford, Tennessee State
- Hugh Durham Award (Top mid-major coach): James Jones, Yale
- Jim Phelan Award (Top head coach): Greg Gard, Wisconsin
- Lefty Driesell Award (Top defensive player): Vashil Fernandez, Valparaiso
- Lou Henson Award (Top mid-major player): Thomas Walkup, Stephen F. Austin
- Lute Olson Award (Top non-freshman or transfer player): Denzel Valentine, Michigan State
- Skip Prosser Man of the Year Award (Coach with moral character): Zach Spiker, Army
- Academic All-American of the Year (Top scholar-athlete): Jarrod Uthoff, Iowa
- Elite 90 Award (Top GPA among upperclass players at Final Four): C. J. Cole, Oklahoma

== Coaching changes ==
Several teams changed coaches during and after the season.

Team	Former coach	Interim coach	New coach	Reason
Arkansas State	John Brady		Grant McCasland	Resigned, effective end of the season. Baylor assistant McCasland was named the new head coach.
Army	Zach Spiker		Jimmy Allen	Spiker left after 7 seasons for the Drexel job, and was replaced by top assistant Allen.
Canisius	Jim Baron		Reggie Witherspoon	Baron announced his immediate retirement on May 20, 2016, with Chattanooga assistant coach and former Buffalo head Coach Witherspoon succeeding him.
Central Connecticut	Howie Dickenman		Donyell Marshall	Dickenman announced his retirement from his alma mater after 20 seasons on February 18, effective at the end of the season. Central Connecticut hired Buffalo assistant Marshall, a former UConn star and NBA player.
Columbia	Kyle Smith		Jim Engles	Smith left after 6 seasons for the San Francisco job. NJIT coach Engles was hired as a replacement.
Cornell	Bill Courtney		Brian Earl	Courtney's contract was not renewed by Cornell for the 2016-17 season. The Big Red hired Princeton assistant Earl.
Dartmouth	Paul Cormier		David McLaughlin	Cormier was fired after 6 seasons into his 2nd stint as Dartmouth head coach. David McLaughlin is named as the new HC of the Dartmouth Big Green after being at Northeastern.
Delaware	Monté Ross		Martin Ingelsby	Ross was fired after 10 seasons at Delaware and replaced by Notre Dame assistant Ingelsby.
Denver	Joe Scott		Rodney Billups	Scott was fired after 9 seasons at Denver and replaced by Colorado assistant and ex-Pioneer player Billups.
Detroit	Ray McCallum		Bacari Alexander	Detroit cleaned out its program after the season, starting with McCallum and two of his assistants. Michigan assistant Bacari Alexander returns to his alma mater to become the head coach the Titans.
Drexel	Bruiser Flint		Zach Spiker	On March 7, 2016, following the end of Drexel's season, Flint was fired as head basketball coach after 15 seasons with the team. Spiker was hired from Army.
George Washington	Mike Lonergan	Maurice Joseph		Despite leading the Colonials to the NIT title, Lonergan was fired on September 16 amid a university investigation into alleged verbal and emotional abuse of players. GW promoted assistant Joseph on an interim basis and removed the "interim" tag after the 2016–17 season, signing him to a 5-year contract.
Georgia Tech	Brian Gregory		Josh Pastner	Gregory was fired after missing the NCAA tournament in all five of his seasons at Georgia Tech. Memphis head coach Pastner was ultimately hired.
Jacksonville State	James Green		Ray Harper	Green was fired after the season and succeeded by recently departed Western Kentucky coach Harper.
James Madison	Matt Brady		Louis Rowe	On March 14, 2016, Brady "mutually parted ways" with the Dukes as after eight seasons and one NCAA appearance. JMU's athletic director cited declining attendance and poor performances in the CAA tournament. Former JMU player and Bowling Green assistant Rowe was named the new head coach.
Little Rock	Chris Beard		Wes Flanigan	Beard left after a single season to take the UNLV job, though he would later move to Texas Tech. Assistant coach Flanigan was elevated to the head coaching role.
Memphis	Josh Pastner		Tubby Smith	Pastner left Memphis after 7 seasons for the Georgia Tech job and was replaced by Texas Tech coach Smith.
Milwaukee	Rob Jeter		LaVall Jordan	Jeter was fired after 11 seasons at Milwaukee and was replaced by Michigan assistant Jordan.
New Mexico State	Marvin Menzies		Paul Weir	Menzies left after 9 seasons for the Rebels of UNLV HC job. After being the associate HC of the Aggies, Paul Weir now will take the reins of the HC of the Aggies.
Nicholls State	J. P. Piper		Richie Riley	Piper was fired following the season. Former assistant coach at Clemson, Richie Riley has become the new HC of the Colonels.
NJIT	Jim Engles		Brian Kennedy	Engles left NJIT after 8 seasons for Columbia. Assistant coach Brian Kennedy was named as the next HC of the Highlanders.
North Carolina A&T	Cy Alexander	Jay Joyner		Alexander resigned on January 29 to pursue other opportunities within North Carolina A&T's athletics department. Alexander compiled an overall record of 43–80 during his 3+ years as North Carolina A&T's head coach, including a 5–17 mark in 2015–16 at the time of his resignation. Joyner had the interim tag removed on March 7 to become the next full-time head coach.
Northern Colorado	B. J. Hill		Jeff Linder	Hill was fired while Northern Colorado was under NCAA investigation. The Bears hired Boise State assistant Linder.
Oklahoma State	Travis Ford		Brad Underwood	Ford was fired after nine seasons at Oklahoma State Underwood took the job after leading Stephen F. Austin to NCAA tournament success.
Pacific	Ron Verlin	Mike Burns	Damon Stoudamire	Pacific fired Verlin on March 3, along with assistant Dwight Young. Both had been suspended since December amid an NCAA investigation into alleged academic misconduct. The Tigers hired Memphis assistant Stoudamire, better known for his 13 seasons as an NBA player.
Pittsburgh	Jamie Dixon		Kevin Stallings	Dixon left Pittsburgh after 13 years to take the head coach job at his alma mater, TCU. The Panthers hired Stallings away from Vanderbilt.
Portland	Eric Reveno		Terry Porter	Reveno was fired after 10 seasons and an overall 140–178 record, finishing with a 12–20 season in 2015–16. The Pilots hired one of their city's basketball icons in Porter, a longtime star for the Portland Trail Blazers who later had extensive NBA coaching experience.
Prairie View	Byron Rimm	Byron Smith		Rimm announced his resignation on January 27, effective immediately, with the Panthers at 1–18 on the season. Rimm had only two winning seasons in 10 seasons as head coach. Assistant Byron Smith was named interim head coach for the remainder of the season. Prairie View removed the interim tag from Smith on March 13.
Rutgers	Eddie Jordan		Steve Pikiell	Jordan was fired on March 10 after three seasons at his alma mater. Jordan compiled an overall record of 29–68, ending with a 7–25 overall record and a 1–15 Big Ten record in 2015–16. The Scarlet Knights turned to Stony Brook coach Pikiell.
Saint Louis	Jim Crews		Travis Ford	Crews was fired on March 9 after four seasons. The Billikens made the NCAA tournament in each of Crews' first two seasons as head coach, but went 11–21 in each of the last two seasons. SLU replaced Crews with newly departed Oklahoma State coach Ford.
San Francisco	Rex Walters		Kyle Smith	Walters was fired on March 9, following the West Coast Conference tournament, after eight seasons in charge. After a run of three postseason appearances in four seasons, the Dons finished under .500 in WCC play in both 2014–15 and 2015–16. USF hired Columbia's Smith fresh off the Lions' CIT victory.
Santa Clara	Kerry Keating		Herb Sendek	Keating was fired after 9 seasons at Santa Clara. Ex-Arizona State head coach Sendek was hired as head coach of the Broncos.
SMU	Larry Brown		Tim Jankovich	Brown surprisingly stepped down as SMU coach on July 8, 2016 after 4 seasons. Jankovich, who had been hired along with Brown in 2012 as his top assistant and designated successor, was elevated to the top spot.
South Dakota State	Scott Nagy		T. J. Otzelberger	Nagy left S. Dakota St. after 21 seasons for the Wright State job and was replaced by Iowa State assistant Otzelberger.
Southern Utah	Nick Robinson		Todd Simon	Robinson was fired after a 28-90 record in 4 seasons at SUU. Former UNLV interim head coach Simon was hired to replace Robinson.
Stanford	Johnny Dawkins		Jerod Haase	Dawkins was fired after eight seasons, and replaced by UAB head coach Haase.
Stephen F. Austin	Brad Underwood		Kyle Keller	Underwood left SFA after 3 seasons for Oklahoma State and was replaced by Texas A&M assistant Keller.
Stony Brook	Steve Pikiell		Jeff Boals	Pikiell left Stony Brook after 11 seasons for the Rutgers job and was replaced by Ohio State assistant Boals.
TCU	Trent Johnson		Jamie Dixon	Johnson was fired after four seasons, a 50–79 overall record at the school, and an 8–64 record in Big 12 play. He was replaced by Pittsburgh head coach and former TCU player Dixon.
Tennessee–Martin	Heath Schroyer	Anthony Stewart		Schroyer left his post to become assistant head coach at NC State. Assistant Stewart was initially named interim head coach for the 2016–17 season but had the interim tag removed before the start of the season on November 3, 2016, signing a 4-year contract with UT Martin.
Texas Tech	Tubby Smith		Chris Beard	Smith left Texas Tech after 3 seasons for Memphis. After leaving Little Rock for UNLV less than a month earlier, Beard left for Texas Tech, where he had served as an assistant from 2001 to 2011.
Texas–Rio Grande Valley	Dan Hipsher		Lew Hill	Hipsher was fired after 3 seasons at UTRGV. The Vaqueros hired Oklahoma assistant Hill.
Tulane	Ed Conroy		Mike Dunleavy	Word of Conroy's impending firing came to him as he was coaching the Green Wave to an upset victory in the 2016 AAC tournament. The move was made official a few days later. Former NBA coach Dunleavy was hired for his first college coaching job, after a six-year hiatus from coaching.
UAB	Jerod Haase		Robert Ehsan	Haase left UAB after 4 seasons to take the Stanford job and was replaced by assistant Ehsan.
UCF	Donnie Jones		Johnny Dawkins	Jones was fired on March 10 after six seasons. Although he compiled a 100–88 overall record, the Knights went 12–18 overall and 6–12 in American Athletic play this season. Dawkins was hired fresh off his firing by Stanford.
UMBC	Aki Thomas		Ryan Odom	Thomas was fired after 4 seasons and an overall record of 28-95 at UMBC. The Retrievers hired former Charlotte interim head coach Odom.
UNLV	Dave Rice	Todd Simon	Marvin Menzies	Rice was fired from his alma mater on January 10. Despite Rice's 98–54 record in four-plus seasons at UNLV, the Runnin' Rebels failed to make the postseason in either of the last two seasons, and an 0–3 start in Mountain West play was apparently the final straw for UNLV; top assistant Simon was named as interim head coach. Following the season, Chris Beard was initially hired from Little Rock after leading the Trojans to NCAA tournament success, but left less than a month later for Texas Tech. NMSU head coach Menzies, a UNLV assistant during the Lon Kruger era, was hired to replace Beard.
UTSA	Brooks Thompson		Steve Henson	Thompson was fired on March 10 after 10 seasons. He had a 133–178 overall record, with the Roadrunners finishing this season 5–27 overall and 3–15 in Conference USA play. He was replaced by Oklahoma assistant Henson.
Valparaiso	Bryce Drew		Matt Lottich	Drew left his alma mater after 5 seasons to take over at Vanderbilt and was replaced by assistant Lottich.
Vanderbilt	Kevin Stallings		Bryce Drew	Stallings left Vanderbilt after 17 seasons for the Pittsburgh job. Vanderbilt hired Bryce Drew from Valparaiso.
Western Kentucky	Ray Harper		Rick Stansbury	Harper resigned on March 17, 2016 after three WKU players were suspended following a school disciplinary hearing, eventually landing at Jacksonville State. The Hilltoppers hired longtime Mississippi State head coach Stansbury from his then-current post as an assistant at Texas A&M.
Wisconsin	Bo Ryan	Greg Gard		Ryan announced his retirement on December 15, 2015, effective immediately. Top assistant Gard was named as interim head coach; Wisconsin removed the interim tag after the regular season, signing Gard to a 5-year contract.
Wright State	Billy Donlon		Scott Nagy	Despite making it into the finals of the Horizon League tournament, Donlon was fired on March 17 after 6 seasons at Wright State with a 109-93 career record. The Raiders then hired Nagy away from South Dakota State.
Wyoming	Larry Shyatt		Allen Edwards	Shyatt announced his retirement after 5 seasons into his 2nd stint at Wyoming on March 21, 2016, turning the program over to top assistant Edwards.

== See also ==
- 2015–16 NCAA Division I women's basketball season
