= Antwoine Womack =

American football player (born 1978)

No. 42
- Position: Running back

Personal information
- Born: March 20, 1978 (age 48); Hampton, Virginia, U.S.
- Listed height: 5 ft 11 in (1.80 m)
- Listed weight: 225 lb (102 kg)

Career information
- High school: Phoebus (Hampton)
- College: Virginia
- NFL draft: 2002: 7th round, 237th overall pick

Career history
- New England Patriots (2002); New York Giants (2004)

Awards and highlights
- First-team All-ACC (2000)

Antwoine Womack (born March 20, 1978) is an American football running back. He played college football at Virginia. He was drafted in the seventh round of the 2002 NFL draft by the New England Patriots.

== Early life and education ==
Womack's football career began at Phoebus High School in Hampton, Virginia, where he was the first football player in school history to have his number retired. He finished his career as the Virginia Group AAA all-time leading rusher with 5,570 yards and was named the state's top football prospect his senior season.

Womack was the subject of an intense recruiting battle between the University of Virginia and Penn State. He chose Penn State, at first. He then changed his mind and decided he wanted to play for Virginia.

He was initially successful at Virginia, backing up all-time leading rusher Thomas Jones and leading the team in rushing in one game.

However, Womack's personal life slowed down his college football career.

Womack's junior season in 2000 was truly his coming-out party (after a year's layoff). He was outstanding in his first season as the Cavaliers' starter, totaling an ACC-best 1,028 yards and nine touchdowns. He earned first-team All-ACC honors for his efforts and received Virginia's Outstanding Offensive Player Award.

The 2001 season was shaping up to be Womack's best at Virginia. However, in the first quarter of the season opener against Wisconsin, he slipped on the wet artificial turf and sprained his ankle and missed several games. Womack returned later in the year for a game against Georgia Tech and helped spark a Virginia comeback. He also led the Virginia comeback against Penn State in his final collegiate game, rushing for 153 yards on 31 carries.

== Professional career ==
Womack entered the NFL by way of the 2002 NFL draft as the 26th selection of the 7th round (pick 237 overall), being selected by the New England Patriots. He spent the 2002 season on injured reserve and did not play due to continuing problems from his 2001 ankle injury.

On August 25, 2003, the Patriots released Womack.

Womack was on the New York Giants roster in 2004. However, after injuring his knee in preseason practice, the Giants waived him on August 2, 2004. He was listed on the injured reserve list for the New York Giants as of December 31, 2004.
