= Fox Hill, Virginia =

Coordinates: 37°04′52″N 76°17′44″W

Fox Hill once known as Rip Raps is an area within the eastern part of Hampton, Virginia. It is mostly a residential community with a few small businesses scattered throughout. Fox Hill is bordered to the south by Phoebus, a neighborhood and former town that was incorporated within the city of Hampton; and Buckroe, a small beachfront community. Fox Hill Extends from Bloxom's Corner down Beach Road to Grandview Island and includes areas down Beach Road and borders Colonial Acres at Silver Isles Blvd.

== Areas of interest ==
Grandvew is an island that is connected by marshland. It is also a beachfront neighborhood on the Chesapeake Bay. The Back River Light once stood just offshore. Fox Hill is served by Wallace's Marina located at the end of Dandy Point Road and is a popular place for fishermen due to its proximity and access to the Chesapeake Bay.

== Schools ==
Francis Asbury Elementary School is the only school within Fox Hill itself. Kecoughtan High School is the only high school near the Fox Hill area and serves the neighborhood and is one of four high schools in the city. Syms Middle School, Jones Magnet Middle, Phillips Elementary, and Baron Elementary are other schools near Fox Hill.

== Organizations ==
- Clark Cemetery Association
- Cornerstone Fellowship Church
- First Calvary Baptist Church
- First United Methodist Church of Fox Hill
- Fox Hill Athletic Association
- Fox Hill Central United Methodist Church
- Fox Hill Crop Club
- Fox Hill Historical Society
- Fox Hill Ladies Auxiliary
- Fox Hill Senior Citizens Club
- Fox Hill Volunteer Fire Company
- Francis Asbury Elementary School PTA
- Grandview Island Beach Partners
- Grandview Shores Civic League
- Kecoughtan High School Band
- RIley's Way Homeowner's Association
- Southall Landing Homeowner's Association
- Wallace Memorial United Methodist Church
