= Terrell A. Morgan =

American linguist

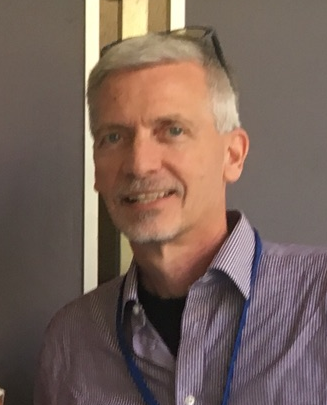
- Born: January 22, 1957 (age 69); Newport News, Virginia, United States of America

Academic background
- Education: College of William & Mary; University of North Carolina at Chapel Hill; University of Texas at Austin

Academic work
- Discipline: Hispanic linguistics
- Institutions: Ohio State University

Terrell A. Morgan (born January 22, 1957) is an American linguist and professor of Hispanic linguistics at Ohio State University. He is a phonologist and dialectologist specializing in documenting linguistic diversity and developing methods for students, teachers, and other linguists to experience the sounds and structures of Spanish in the real world. His research includes work on phonetic and morphosyntactic variation on topics such as rhotics, voseo, the current usage of vosotros, and pedagogical approaches to phonetics.

== Education ==
Morgan graduated from the College of William & Mary in 1979 with a B.A. in linguistics and a minor in computer science. During his undergraduate career, he studied abroad at the University of Valencia in Spain. After earning his M.A. in linguistics from the University of North Carolina at Chapel Hill, Morgan went on to complete a Ph.D. in Hispanic linguistics at the University of Texas at Austin in 1984. His dissertation Consonant-Glide-Vowel Alternations in Spanish: A Case Study in Syllabic and Lexical Phonology was directed by Jean-Pierre Y. Montreuil.

== Career ==
Morgan has been a professor of Hispanic linguistics at the Ohio State University since 1984. Additionally, Morgan has served as director of the Ohio Hispanic Heritage Project, and director of the Center for Latin American Studies at the Ohio State University.

Morgan published the Spanish phonetics textbook Sonidos en contexto: Una introducción a la fonética del español con especial referencia a la vida real in 2010. He has also co-edited two volumes, written book chapters, and published articles in journals such as Spanish in Context, Probus, and Studies in Romance Linguistics. He has delivered keynote addresses at conferences such as the Foreign Language Association of Virginia and Laboratory Approaches to Spanish Phonetics and Phonology and presented at the Hispanic Linguistics Symposium, the Workshop on Spanish Sociolinguistics, the Asociación de Lingüística y Filología de América Latina, and the Sociolinguistics Symposium, among others. Morgan has received multiple awards, including the Carnegie Foundation's Ohio Professor of the Year, the Alumni Award for Distinguished Teaching (awarded twice), and the Friend of the Foreign Language Association of Virginia Award.

Morgan is the creator of the website Voices of the Hispanic World, an interactive collection of interviews with people from around the Spanish-speaking world designed to give Spanish teachers and students a way to experience Spanish dialects firsthand.

=== Summer Seminars Abroad for Spanish Teachers ===
In 1991, Morgan founded the Ohio State University Summer Seminars Abroad for Spanish Teachers (SSAST), an intensive two-week seminar that teaches primary and secondary school teachers of Spanish about Hispanic linguistics. The seminar has been held throughout the Spanish-speaking world. Previous locations include Cuernavaca, Mexico; Quito, Ecuador; San José, Costa Rica; Valencia, Spain; Santiago de los Caballeros, Dominican Republic; Santiago, Chile; Asunción, Paraguay; Antigua, Guatemala; Cochabamba, Bolivia; Granada, Nicaragua; Córdoba, Argentina; Lima, Peru; Barranquilla, Colombia; and Havana, Cuba.

== Personal life ==
Morgan grew up in Hampton, Virginia, where he graduated from Kecoughtan High School in 1975. While studying abroad in Valencia, Spain, he met Esperanza Roselló and the two have been married since 1980. The couple has two sons, Caleb and Rubén.

== Selected publications ==
- Morgan, T. A., & Schwenter, S. A. (2016). Vosotros, ustedes, and the myth of the symmetrical Castilian pronoun system. Inquiries in Hispanic Linguistics: From theory to empirical evidence, 12, 263.
- Morgan, T. A., & Sessarego, S. (2016). A phonetic analysis of intervocalic /r/ in Highland Bolivian Spanish. Spanish in Context, 13(2), 195-211.
- Morgan, T. A. (2010). Sonidos en contexto: Una introducción a la fonética del español con especial referencia a la vida real. New Haven, Connecticut: Yale University Press.
- Morgan, T. A. (2006). On the teaching of Spanish pronunciation. In Selected Proceedings of the 2nd Conference on Laboratory Approaches to Spanish Phonetics and Phonology, 119-130.
- Díaz-Campos, M., & Morgan, T.A. (2002). On the production and perception of Spanish palatal obstruents: An acoustic phonetic study with implications for phonology, dialectology, and pedagogy. In J. Lee, K. Geeslin, & J.C. Clements (eds.), Structure, Meaning and Acquisition in Spanish. Somerville, Massachusetts: Cascadilla Press. 244-268.
- Beckman, M., Díaz-Campos, M., McGory, J. T., & Morgan, T. A. (2002). Intonation across Spanish, in the Tones and Break Indices framework. Probus, 14(1), 9-36.
- Morgan, T. A. (2000). The curious pedigree of Spanish orthographic h. In H. Campos et al. (Eds.). Hispanic Linguistics at the Turn of the Millennium: Papers from the 3rd Hispanic Linguistics Symposium (pp. 144–154). Somerville, Massachusetts: Cascadilla Press.
- Morgan, T.A. (1998). The linguistic parameters of /s/ insertion in Dominican Spanish: A case study in qualitative hypercorrection. Perspectives on Spanish Linguistics, 3, 79-96.
- Laeufer, C. & Morgan, T. A. (Eds.) (1992). Theoretical Analyses in Romance Linguistics. Amsterdam: John Benjamins.
- Morgan, T. A., & Janda, R. D. (1989). Musically-conditioned stress shift in Spanish revisited: Empirical verification and nonlinear analysis. In C. Kirschner & J. DeCesaris (eds.), Studies in Romance linguistics: Selected proceedings from the 17th Linguistic Symposium on Romance Languages. Amsterdam: John Benjamins. 273-288.
- Morgan, T.A., J.F. Lee, & B. VanPatten (eds.). (1987). Language and Language Use: Studies in Spanish. Lanham, Maryland: University Press of America.
