= Kecoughtan High School =

Public high school in Hampton, Virginia

Location
- 522 Woodland Road; Hampton, Virginia 23669; United States; 37°03′18″N 76°19′05″W

Information
- School type: Public high school
- Founded: 1962
- School district: Hampton City Schools
- Superintendent: Raymond Haynes
- Principal: Dwayne Lucas
- Staff: 15.62
- Grades: 9–12
- Enrollment: 1,726 (2017–18)
- Student to teacher ratio: 15.62
- Language: English
- Campus: Suburban
- Colors: Green and White
- Athletics conference: Virginia High School League 6A South Classification
- Mascot: Warrior
- Rival: Phoebus High School; Bethel High School; Hampton High School
- Communities served: Fox Hill, Virginia
- Website: https://khs.hampton.k12.va.us/

Kecoughtan High School (/ˈkɪkətæn/ KICK-uh-tan) is a public high school located in Hampton, Virginia. The current grades offered are 9–12. Kecoughtan High School is one of four high schools located in the Hampton City Public School District. The other three are Phoebus, Bethel, and Hampton high schools.

== Feeder pattern ==
- Asbury Elementary School
- Barron Elementary School
- Booker Elementary School
- Langley Elementary School
- Phillips Elementary School
- Capt John Smith Elementary School
- Jones Magnet Middle School
- Syms Middle School
- Eaton Middle School
- Ann H. Kilgore Gifted Center

== History ==
Kecoughtan High School was originally built in 1961–1962 to handle the overflow of Hampton High School, the oldest high school in the city. Since then Kecoughtan has been used as an educational facility for high school students in the Fox Hill area, a major neighborhood in the Hampton Roads region. Kecoughtan is the only high school near the neighborhood.

The word Kecoughtan comes from the name of the Virginia Algonquian Native Americans living there when the English colonists arrived in the Hampton Roads area in 1607. The Native Americans were originally named Kikotan (also spelled Kiccowtan, Kikowtan etc.)

The first academic school year was 1963–64. Since the school was built to handle the overflow of Hampton High School students who were previously enrolled as sophomores at Hampton High School were enrolled as juniors at Kecoughtan High School. This makes the first graduating class 1965 and the 50th Graduating class from KHS was the class of 2014.

== Sports ==
Kecoughtan High School offers Baseball, Basketball, Cheerleading, Cross country, Field Hockey, Football, Golf, Soccer, Softball, Swimming, Tennis, Track, Boys and girls volleyball and Wrestling.

In 2016, the school's wrestling team completed its first undefeated regular season, for the first time in the program's history.

== Notable alumni ==
- Lisa Aukland – bodybuilder
- Macey Brooks – National Football League player (1997–2000)
- Trenton Cannon – National Football League player (2018–present)
- Jake Cave – baseball player
- Jo Ann Davis – member of the United States House of Representatives from Virginia (2001–2007)
- Tom Gear – politician
- James Genus – jazz bassist
- Dwight Hollier – National Football League player (1992–2000)
- Deron Mayo – Canadian Football League player (2012–2017); NFL coach (2018–present)
- Jerod Mayo – National Football League player (2008–2015); Head Coach of the New England Patriots (2024)
- Tajama Abraham Ngongba – former WNBA player
- Randall Reed – General in the United States Air Force
- Bert Mizusawa – Major General in the United States Army Reserve
- Sam Newsome – jazz player
- Terrell A. Morgan – American linguistics and professor of Hispanic linguistics
- Jared Hendrix – member of the North Dakota House of Representatives from (2024–present)

== Marching and Symphonic Band ==
The Kecoughtan Marching "Warriors" are a Class AAA band that has been a Virginia Honor Band three times. The band was part of the 2011 National Memorial Day Parade Lineup in Washington, D.C., on May 30, 2011.

The Kecoughtan band has hosted their annual "Warrior Classic" marching band competition at Darling Stadium since 1990.
