= James Daniel III =

American basketball player (born 1994)

Personal information
- Born: January 29, 1994 (age 31); Hampton, Virginia, U.S.
- Listed height: 6 ft 0 in (1.83 m)
- Listed weight: 172 lb (78 kg)

Career information
- High school: Phoebus (Hampton, Virginia)
- College: Howard (2013–2017); Tennessee (2017–2018)
- NBA draft: 2018: undrafted
- Playing career: 2018–2018
- Position: Shooting guard

Career history
- 2018: Enosis Neon Paralimni

Career highlights
- AP Honorable Mention All-American (2016); NCAA scoring champion (2016); MEAC Player of the Year (2016); First-team All-MEAC (2016)

James Edward Daniel III (born January 29, 1994) is an American former professional basketball player. He transferred from Howard University in Washington, D.C. He is notable for leading the NCAA in scoring as a junior in the 2015–16 season and was named the Mid-Eastern Athletic Conference Player of the Year the same season.

Daniel, a 5-foot-11-inch (1.80 m) shooting guard from Phoebus High School in Hampton, Virginia, came to Howard and immediately made an impact. After averaging 21 points per game, he was named Mid-Eastern Athletic Conference (MEAC) Rookie of the Year. During his sophomore season, Daniel became the first Howard player to score 1,000 points in his first two seasons. In his junior season, Daniel averaged 27.1 points per game to lead the country in scoring. He was named first-team All-MEAC and the conference player of the year.

Following an injury-plagued 2016–17 season where he was limited to two games, Daniel was granted an extra year of eligibility by the National Collegiate Athletic Association (NCAA). Daniel ultimately chose Tennessee, where he will be immediately eligible for the 2017–18 season.

Daniel reached the 2,000 career point milestone on December 20, 2017, in a home win over Furman.

After ending undrafted he signed a contract overseas for Enosis Neon Paralimni. After only playing nine games in 2019 his contract was ended. He played in 2019 in The Basketball Tournament for Team Boo Williams. He played in 2019 also in the preseason of the G-League for the Northern Arizona Suns. In 2021 he played again in The Basketball Tournament this time for Bleed Virginia.
