= Nyra Williams =

American basketball player (born 1998)

Nyra Cebella Williams (born September 2, 1998) is an American college basketball player for Virginia Commonwealth University (VCU).

== Personal life ==
Nyra was born and raised in Hampton, Virginia. Nyra has a brother and a sister. Her sister's name is Tayloré Williams and her brother's name is Edward Williams III. Nyra's parents are Jacqueline Williams and Edward Williams II. Nyra's mother is a teacher at ECPI University and her father works at Newport News Shipyard.

== AAU ==
Nyra started playing basketball when she was 5 years old for an Amateur Athletic Union (AAU) team called the Baby Widows. Throughout her AAU career Nyra has played for 6 different teams. The Baby Widows, The Black Widows, The Lady Lakers, Norfolk Express, and BWSL Richmond.

In 2014 Nyra won the Battle in the Boro with her AAU team BWSL Richmond.

== High school ==
Nyra went to Bethel High School where she played on the varsity basketball team for 4 years. Nyra was a starter from her freshman year to her senior year.

In Nyra's freshman year she played 22 games. She averaged 8.1 points per game (ppg), 2.5 rebounds per game (rpg), 3.2 assists per game (apg), and 1.8 steals per game (spg). She scored 178 points for the season.

In Nyra's sophomore year she played 27 games. She averaged 9.3 points per game (ppg), 2.9 rebounds per game (rpg), 4.2 assists per game (apg), and 2.2 steals per game. She scored 252 points for the season.

In Nyra's junior year she played 28 games. She averaged 11.4 points per game (ppg), 4.1 rebounds per game (rpg), 6.2 assists per game (apg), and 3.4 steals per game (spg). She scored 319 points for the season. In Nyra's junior year her team made it to the state championship game.

In Nyra's senior year she played 25 games. She averaged 10.9 points per game (ppg), 5.1 rebounds per game (rpg), 5.6 assists per game (apg), and 3.3 steals per game (spg). In Nyra's senior year she scored 272 points for the season. Nyra scored her 1,000th point and her 500th assist in her senior year.

== College ==
Nyra played for VCU in the position of point guard.

== Career statistics ==
Legend
GP	Games played	GS	Games started	MPG	Minutes per game	RPG	Rebounds per game
APG	Assists per game	SPG	Steals per game	BPG	Blocks per game	PPG	Points per game
TO	Turnovers per game	FG%	Field-goal percentage	3P%	3-point field-goal percentage	FT%	Free-throw percentage
**Bold**	Career best	°	League leader

=== College ===
Year	Team	GP	GS	MPG	FG%	3P%	FT%	RPG	APG	SPG	BPG	TO	PPG
2016–17	VCU	9	0	2.6	0.0	0.0	0.0	0.3	0.6	0.0	0.0	**0.3**	0.0
2017–18	VCU	29	24	29.8	36.8	23.5	**77.4**	3.4	3.2	**1.6**	0.1	2.5	**5.3**
2018–19	VCU	**34**	**34**	29.0	**37.4**	**26.3**	64.7	**3.5**	3.2	1.2	0.1	1.9	3.9
2019–20	VCU	32	32	**31.7**	28.6	16.7	60.0	3.3	**3.4**	1.4	0.1	2.3	2.8
**Career**		104	90	27.8	34.2	22.0	67.3	3.2	3.0	1.3	0.1	2.1	3.6
Statistics retrieved from Sports-Reference.
