= Hampton City Schools =

School division in Virginia, United States

Address
- One Franklin St. Hampton, Virginia, 23669; United States

District information
- Type: Public
- Grades: Pre-K through 12
- Superintendent: Dr. Raymond Haynes
- School board: 7 members 2 Student Representatives
- Chair of the board: Joe C. Kilgore
- Governing agency: Virginia Department of Education
- Schools: 29

Other information
- Website: www.hampton.k12.va.us

Hampton City Schools is the school division of Hampton, Virginia. The district serves almost 20,000 students across 29 schools in Hampton, including 18 elementary, three K-8, five middle, and five high schools, and a PreK learning center.

== History ==
=== School Renaming ===
In 2021, Hampton City Schools made the decision to rename five schools and educational centers. All of the schools were renamed after Hampton residents who made an impact on their community.

=== Former Superintendents ===
C. Alton Lindsay served as superintendent until June 30, 1968, when he retired. Garland R. Lively was scheduled to take over that position.

== Administration ==
=== Superintendent ===
The superintendent of Hampton City Schools is Dr. Raymond Haynes. Before his appointment in 2023, Haynes was the district's executive director of schools and chief of secondary school leadership.

=== School Board ===
There are 7 members on the school board and 2 student representatives

School Board Members:

- Dr. Richard Mason, Chair
- Dr. Tina Banks-Gray, Vice Chair
- Stephanie Jackson Afonja
- Ann Cherry
- Joseph C. "Joe" Kilgore
- Jason S. Samuels
- Dr. Reginald Woodhouse
- Student Representatives:
- Sophia Harris, Student Representative
- Jonathan Jackson, Student Representative

== Schools ==
=== High schools ===
- Bethel High School
- Hampton High School
- Kecoughtan High School
- Phoebus High School
- Bridgeport Academy

=== K-8 schools ===
- Andrews PreK-8
- Phenix PreK-8
- Kilgore Gifted Center (3-8)

=== Middle schools ===
- Eaton Middle School
- Jones Middle School
- Lindsay Middle School
- Syms Middle School
- Tarrant Middle School

=== Elementary schools ===
- Aberdeen Elementary School
- Armstrong Elementary School
- Asbury Elementary School
- Barron Elementary School
- Bassette Elementary School
- Bryan Elementary School
- Burbank Elementary School
- Christian Elementary School
- Cooper Elementary School
- Forrest Elementary School
- Jackson Elementary School
- Kraft Elementary School
- Langley Elementary School
- Machen Elementary School
- Patrick Elementary School
- Peake Elementary School
- Phillips Elementary School
- Smith Elementary School

=== Pre-Kindergarten ===
- Robert R. Moton Early Childhood Center
