= Phoebus High School =

Location
- 100 Ireland Street; Hampton, Virginia 23663; United States; 37°02′02″N 76°18′59″W

Information
- School type: Public High school
- Founded: 1975
- School district: Hampton City Schools
- Superintendent: Dr. Raymond Haynes
- Dean: Sherrie Bollhorst
- Principal: Mr. David Coccoli
- Staff: 93.38 (FTE)
- Grades: 9-12
- Enrollment: 1,043 (2017-18)
- Student to teacher ratio: 11.17
- Language: English
- Campus: Suburban
- Colors: Blue and Gold
- Athletics conference: Virginia High School League; Peninsula District 4A South Classification
- Mascot: Phantoms
- Rival: Hampton High School; Kecoughtan High School
- Communities served: Phoebus, Virginia
- Website: www.phs.hampton.k12.va.us/

Phoebus High School is a public high school in Hampton, Virginia. Named after the neighborhood and former town of Phoebus, it is the newest of the four high schools in Hampton City Schools. Phoebus continues to add nationally board certified teachers and several students have earned industry certifications via the CTE department.

== History ==
Phoebus High School opened in 1975 as the newest high school in the City of Hampton, Virginia. It was designed as an "Open-Concept" school: Permanent interior walls were minimized in favor of partitions that could be adjusted depending on building needs. This was a popular trend in many schools built in the 1970s.

Recent upgrades include interior walls, lights and switches, a renovation of the gymnasium and theater as well as the main entrances to the school.

Today Phoebus is home of Hampton City Schools' "Behind the Wheel" program.

== Feeder pattern ==
- Barron Elementary
- Bryan Elementary
- Langley Elementary
- Jones Middle School
- Kilgore Gifted Center
- Syms Middle School
- Phoebus High School
- Hampton high School
- Bethel High School
- Kecoughtan High School

== Demographics ==
=== 2004-2005 school year ===
- 25% Black
- 15% White
- 55% Hispanic
- 5% Other

=== 2014-2015 ===
- 99% Black
- 0.2% White
- 0.3% Asian
- 0.1% Hispanic
- 0.2% two or more
- 0.2% Other

== Notable alumni ==
- Xavier Adibi (Class of 2003), American football player
- Tajh Boyd (Class of 2009), former quarterback at Clemson University, American football player for the New York Jets
- James Daniel III (Class of 2013), college basketball player
- La'Keshia Frett (Class of 1993), distinguished professional basketball player and coach
- Wayne Gomes (Class of 1990), retired Major League Baseball player
- Jalen Mayo (Class of 2022), college football cornerback for the Houston Cougars
- Margot Lee Shetterly (Class of 1987), African-American non-fiction writer
- Terri Williams-Flournoy (Class of 1987), college basketball player and coach
- Antwoine Womack (Class of 1997), American football player
