= Derrick Griffin =

American basketball player (born 1993)

Personal information
- Born: September 3, 1993 (age 33) Houston, Texas, U.S.
- Listed height: 6 ft 7 in (2.01 m)
- Listed weight: 225 lb (102 kg)

Career information
- High school: BF Terry (Rosenberg, Texas)
- College: Texas Southern (2015–2017)
- NBA draft: 2017: undrafted
- Playing career: 2018–2022
- Position: Power forward

Career history
- 2018–2019: South Bay Lakers
- 2019–2020: Stockton Kings
- 2021–2022: Salt Lake City Stars
- 2022: Texas Legends

Career highlights
- SWAC Player of the Year (2016); First-team All-SWAC (2016)

Derrick Griffin (born September 3, 1993) is an American former professional basketball player. He played college basketball and football for the Texas Southern Tigers.

== College football career ==
Griffin was third ranked wide receiver in the nation in 2013, and signed with Miami but did not play due to academics. As a redshirt freshman wide receiver, he led the SWAC in touchdown catches with 11 and was named to the 2015 All-SWAC Football Team.

== College basketball career ==
Griffin averaged 13.5 points-per-game, 11.3 rebounds-per-game, and 2.3 blocks per game as the only SWAC player to average a double-double. He set the conference single-season record for consecutive double-doubles with 12 and most in a single season with 17. Following the season he was named SWAC Player of the Year.

== Professional football career ==
Griffin was dismissed from the football team in 2016. Several weeks later, he ended his college basketball career by signing with an agent to prepare for the NFL Draft. He went undrafted, but signed with the Minnesota Vikings although he was cut before appearing in a game.

== Professional basketball career ==
=== South Bay Lakers (2018–2019) ===
On September 12, 2018, Griffin signed with the South Bay Lakers of the NBA G League.

=== Stockton Kings (2019–2020) ===
For the 2019–20 season, Griffin moved to the Stockton Kings. Griffin averaged 3.4 points and 3.6 rebounds per game.

On October 23, 2021, Griffin was selected 50th overall by the Birmingham Squadron in the 2021 NBA G League draft. However, he was waived by the Squadron on November 3.

=== Salt Lake City Stars (2021–2022) ===
On December 31, 2021, Griffin was acquired via available player pool by the Salt Lake City Stars. He was then later waived on January 12, 2022.

=== Texas Legends (2022) ===
On February 5, 2022, Griffin was acquired via available player pool by the Texas Legends. He was then later waived on February 18, 2022.
