= Brian Hubble =

American painter

- Born: c. 1978; Newport New, Virginia, U.S.
- Education: The School of the Art Institute of Chicago, Virginia Commonwealth University, The Illustration Academy
- Known for: Illustration, Painting

Brian Hubble (born 1978 in Newport News, Virginia) is an American artist. He received a BFA from Virginia Commonwealth University in 2001 and attended The Illustration Academy the following summer. In 2011, he received his MFA at The School of the Art Institute of Chicago. He lives and works in Brooklyn.

Hubble has created photo-collage illustrations for publications such as The New York Times, Harper's Magazine, M.I.T. Technology Review and Psychology Today. In 2004, he made illustrations for The Stranger, author of Under the Tuscan Sun Francis Mayes for Atlanta Magazine, and legendary rock band Guided By Voices for Cincinnati Citybeat. Additional clients of his include Atlantic Monthly, Yale, The Deal, Johns Hopkins, Bulletin of the Atomic Scientists, Duke University, The American Prospect, Notre Dame, Progresa (Spain), VMEN (Greece), and Foreign Policy (France).

His illustrations have most recently been included in Taschen's Illustration Now! Vol. 3 and Print.

Hubble has also curated and exhibited throughout the U.S. including Darke Gallery in Houston, Texas, Ghostprint Gallery in Richmond, Virginia, and Rabbithole Gallery in Brooklyn, New York.
