= R. J. Hunter =

American basketball player (born 1993)

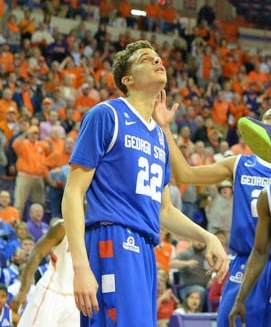
- Hunter at Georgia State in 2014

Tulane Green Wave
- Title: Assistant Coach
- Conference: American Athletic Conference

Personal information
- Born: October 24, 1993 (age 33) Oxford, Ohio, U.S.
- Listed height: 6 ft 5 in (1.96 m)
- Listed weight: 185 lb (84 kg)

Career information
- High school: Pike (Indianapolis, Indiana)
- College: Georgia State (2012–2015)
- NBA draft: 2015: 1st round, 28th overall pick
- Drafted by: Boston Celtics
- Playing career: 2015–2024
- Position: Shooting guard
- Number: 2, 3, 9, 11, 12, 22, 28, 31
- Coaching career: 2024–present

Career history

Playing
- 2015–2016: Boston Celtics
- 2015–2016: →Maine Red Claws
- 2016: Chicago Bulls
- 2016: →Windy City Bulls
- 2017: Long Island Nets
- 2017–2018: Rio Grande Valley Vipers
- 2018: Houston Rockets
- 2018: →Rio Grande Valley Vipers
- 2018–2019: Erie BayHawks
- 2019: Boston Celtics
- 2019: →Maine Red Claws
- 2019–2020: Türk Telekom
- 2020: College Park Skyhawks
- 2020–2021: Galatasaray
- 2021–2022: Sydney Kings
- 2023–2024: Greensboro Swarm

Coaching
- 2024–present: Tulane (assistant)

Career highlights
- 2× Sun Belt Male Athlete of the Year (2014, 2015); 2× Sun Belt Player of the Year (2014, 2015); 2× First-team All-Sun Belt (2014, 2015); CAA Rookie of the Year (2013); First-team All-CAA (2013)
- Stats at NBA.com
- Stats at Basketball Reference

Ronald Jordan Hunter (born October 24, 1993) is an American basketball coach and former player who is currently an assistant coach for the Tulane Green Wave men's basketball team.

He played college basketball for the Georgia State Panthers under the direction of his father and head coach, Ron Hunter. At Georgia State, he was twice named Sun Belt Player of the Year as well as the Sun Belt Conference Male Athlete of the Year. He holds the school record for most career points with a total of 1,819 after just three seasons of play.

== High school career ==
Hunter attended Pike High School in Indianapolis averaging 20.5 points, 6.6 rebounds, 3.8 assists and 2.9 steals per game as a senior. That year he led Pike to the Indiana State Championships, ending as a runner-up, and in the process earned All-Marion County First Team, a conference player of the year award and an Indiana All-Star mention.

== College career ==
Hunter played three seasons for Georgia State University under his father and head coach, Ron Hunter. After his junior season, he declared for the 2015 NBA draft.

=== Freshman season ===
Hunter recorded a double-double with 14 points and 10 rebounds in his collegiate debut against No. 8 Duke. He also scored 20 or more points 12 times during his freshman season, leading GSU in scoring 15 times. He earned Kyle Macy Freshman All-America honors, CAA Rookie of the Year, All-CAA First-Team and CAA All-Rookie Team after becoming the most prolific freshman scorer in Georgia State University history. Hunter finished the year with a school-record 527 points (17 PPG) and was one of just three freshmen in the country to average at least 17.0 points and 5.0 rebounds per game.

=== Sophomore season ===
Hunter's trend of record setting continued into the rest of his career at GSU. Overall, he averaged 18.4 ppg, scoring 604 for the season and became the first Panther to make 100 3-pointers in a single season. That 3-pointer count was No. 16 in the NCAA. Hunter was excellent from the free-throw line, setting the school record in single-season average by hitting 88.2 percent (No. 1 percentage in the Sun Belt and No. 17 in the NCAA that season). As a part of that effort, he also set a school-record 38 straight free throws made. On defense, Hunter finished second in the Sun Belt and 49th in the NCAA with his 63 steals.

Many know Hunter from seeing highlights of his clutch buzzer-beater in the second round of the 2015 NCAA tournament, but hitting a shot like that was nothing new for him. In his sophomore year, Hunter scored a career-high 41 points against UTSA, making a school single-game-record 12 three-pointers. The 12 threes were also the most in the country during the year and set a new Sun Belt Conference record. In another game that year, he hit the game-winning shot with 11.1 seconds to play against Arkansas State. Another clutch shot came in a game in which Hunter scored 31 points including a crucial 3-pointer with seven seconds left at UT Arlington to send the game to overtime.

Hunter was named Sun Belt Conference Basketball Player of the Year as well as the Sun Belt Conference Male Athlete of the Year. He was also named the Men's Georgia College Player of the Year by the Atlanta Tipoff Club.

=== Junior season ===
In his final season at GSU, Hunter averaged a career-high 19.7 points, scoring a school-record season total of 688 points (a school record he broke each season). He also averaged 4.7 rebounds and 3.6 assists per game. In addition, he made 202 free-throws (No. 7 in the NCAA that year), second-most in school history, while swiping 75 steals, third-most in a single season in program history. The most noteworthy record he set was total career points. Midway through just his third season, Hunter overtook Rodney Hamilton's record of 1,515 points with a basket in front of a GSU home crowd against UL Lafayette on January 24, 2015. Hunter finished the year with a career total of 1,819 points.

The Panthers finished the 2014–15 season as the Sun Belt Conference regular season and tournament champions. With their Sun Belt Tournament championship win over Georgia Southern, the Panthers received a bid to the NCAA tournament. In the round of 64, No. 14 seed Georgia State trailed the No. 3 seed Baylor by 12 points with just 2:53 to play. Hunter took over and scored 12 of the Panthers' final 13 points, including a 30-foot 3-pointer with 2.6 seconds remaining to secure their electrifying come-from-behind upset win, which caused his coach (and father) Ron to fall off his stool in jubilation. The moment was selected as No. 2 in the NCAA's top 10 moments of the tournament, was included in the "One Shining Moment" montage following the championship game, and was one of three nominees for the 2015 Best Upset ESPY Award.

Hunter was again named both Sun Belt Conference Basketball Player of the Year and the Sun Belt Conference Male Athlete of the Year. R.J. was also the only player from a school in Georgia to be named to the Naismith Trophy watch list that season.

=== College records ===
- All-time Georgia State University leader in points (1,819)
- All-time Georgia State University leader in free throws made (448), in free-throw percentage (.853), and in consecutive free throws made (38)
- All-time Georgia State University leader in 3-pointers made (253)
- Single-season Georgia State University leader in 3-pointers made (100, 2013–14)
- Single-season Georgia State University leader free-throw percentage (.882, 2013–14)
- Single-game Sun Belt Conference leader in 3-pointers made (12)
- Single-game Sun Belt Conference leader in free-throw percentage (1.000 16–16, 2015)

== Professional career ==
=== Boston Celtics (2015–2016) ===
On June 25, 2015, Hunter was selected with the 28th overall pick in the 2015 NBA draft by the Boston Celtics. On July 27, he signed his rookie-scale contract with the Celtics. After averaging just 2.8 points per game over his first eight NBA games, Hunter scored 12 points on 5-of-6 shooting off the bench against the Atlanta Hawks on November 24. During his rookie season, Hunter received multiple assignments to the Maine Red Claws, the Celtics' Development League affiliate. On October 24, 2016, Hunter was waived by the Celtics.

=== Chicago Bulls (2016) ===
On October 27, 2016, Hunter signed with the Chicago Bulls. He was waived by the Bulls on December 29, 2016, after appearing in three games. During his time with Chicago, he had multiple assignments to the Windy City Bulls of the NBA Development League.

=== Long Island Nets (2017) ===
On January 6, 2017, Hunter was acquired by the Long Island Nets of the NBA G-League. Four days later, he made his debut for Long Island in a 120–112 loss to the Fort Wayne Mad Ants, recording 22 points, three assists and two steals in 25 minutes off the bench.

=== Rio Grande Valley Vipers (2017–2018) ===
After failing to find a team to participate in training camp under the preseason, he would be assigned to the Rio Grande Valley Vipers of the D-League on October 24, 2017. Hunter made his debut with the team on November 4.

=== Erie BayHawks (2018–2019) ===
On January 14, 2018, Hunter signed a two-way contract with the Houston Rockets. On August 18, 2018, Hunter was waived by the Rockets.

On September 7, 2018, Hunter signed with the Atlanta Hawks. On October 13, 2018, Hunter was waived by the Hawks. Hunter was added to the training camp roster of the Erie BayHawks. In his BayHawks debut, Hunter scored a game-high 34 points on 12-of-18 shooting in a win over the Grand Rapids Drive.

=== Return to Boston (2019) ===
On January 10, 2019, Hunter signed a two-way contract with the Boston Celtics.

=== Türk Telekom (2019–2020) ===
On June 27, 2019, Hunter signed with Türk Telekom of the Turkish Basketball Super League (BSL).

=== College Park Skyhawks (2020) ===
On February 7, 2020, Hunter signed with College Park Skyhawks of the NBA G League (formerly D-League) and an affiliate of the Atlanta Hawks of the NBA. He missed a game against the Greensboro Swarm on February 28 with an illness.

=== Galatasaray (2020–2021) ===
On July 21, 2020, Hunter signed with Galatasaray of the Turkish BSL.

=== Sydney Kings (2021–2022) ===
On July 23, 2021, Hunter signed with the Sydney Kings of the Australian NBL for the 2021–22 season. On January 15, 2022, he was ruled out for the rest of the season after rupturing his left patellar tendon. He was replaced on the roster.

=== Greensboro Swarm (2023–2024) ===
On September 29, 2023, Hunter signed with the Charlotte Hornets, but was waived on October 21, prior to the start of the 2023–24 season. Eight days later, he signed with the Greensboro Swarm.

On October 15, 2024, Hunter retired from professional basketball.

== Coaching career ==
=== Tulane (2024–present) ===
In October 2024, Hunter joined his father on the coaching staff at Tulane as a volunteer assistant coach.

== Career statistics ==
Legend
GP	Games played	GS	Games started	MPG	Minutes per game
FG%	Field goal percentage	3P%	3-point field goal percentage	FT%	Free throw percentage
RPG	Rebounds per game	APG	Assists per game	SPG	Steals per game
BPG	Blocks per game	PPG	Points per game	**Bold**	Career high

=== NBA regular season ===
Year	Team	GP	GS	MPG	FG%	3P%	FT%	RPG	APG	SPG	BPG	PPG
2015–16	Boston	**36**	0	8.8	.367	.302	.857	1.0	.4	.4	**.1**	2.7
2016–17	Chicago	3	0	3.0	.000	.000	–	0.3	.0	.0	.0	.0
2017–18	Houston	5	**1**	9.0	.350	.214	**1.000**	1.0	.6	.6	.0	3.8
2018–19	Boston	1	0	**26.0**	**.462**	**.400**	.500	**3.0**	**3.0**	**1.0**	.0	**17.0**
Career		45	1	8.8	.371	.295	.818	1.0	.4	.4	.1	3.0

=== NBA Playoffs ===
Year	Team	GP	GS	MPG	FG%	3P%	FT%	RPG	APG	SPG	BPG	PPG
2016	Boston	5	0	8.2	.222	.200	.000	1.2	.6	.0	.2	1.0
Career		5	0	8.2	.222	.200	.000	1.2	.6	.0	.2	1.0

=== College ===
Season averages
Season	Team	G	MIN	PTS	REB	AST	STL	BLK	FG%	3P%	FT%	TO
2012–13	Georgia State	31	33.5	17.0	5.1	1.8	1.7	0.8	.439	.365	.776	1.7
2013–14	Georgia State	32	33.5	18.3	4.6	1.8	2.0	1.0	.444	.395	.882	1.2
2014–15	Georgia State	35	37	19.7	4.7	3.6	2.1	1.0	.396	.305	.878	2.2
Career		98	34.6	18.4	4.8	2.4	1.9	0.9	.426	.355	.845	1.7

== Personal life ==
Hunter is the son of Ron Hunter and Amy Hunter, the youngest of two children. He and his older sister, Jasmine, are very close. Hunter's godfather is 15-year NBA veteran Ron Harper.

== See also ==
- List of NCAA Division I men's basketball players with 12 or more 3-point field goals in a game
