= 2015 Sun Belt Conference men's basketball tournament =

- Sun Belt Tournament Logo
- Classification: Division I
- Season: 2014–15
- Teams: 8
- Site: Lakefront Arena; New Orleans, Louisiana
- Champions: Georgia State (1st title)
- Winning coach: Ron Hunter (1st title)
- MVP: Kevin Ware (Georgia State)
- Attendance: 5,418
- Television: ESPN3, ESPN2

2014–15 Sun Belt Conference men's basketball standings
	Conf.				Overall
Team	W		L	PCT	W		L	PCT
Georgia State †	15	–	5	.750	25	–	10	.714
Georgia Southern	14	–	6	.700	22	–	9	.710
Louisiana–Monroe	14	–	6	.700	24	–	14	.632
Louisiana–Lafayette	13	–	7	.650	22	–	14	.611
Texas–Arlington	10	–	10	.500	16	–	15	.516
Appalachian State*	9	–	11	.450	12	–	17	.414
South Alabama	9	–	11	.450	12	–	21	.364
Arkansas–Little Rock	8	–	12	.400	13	–	18	.419
Texas State	7	–	13	.350	14	–	17	.452
Arkansas State	6	–	14	.300	11	–	18	.379
Troy	5	–	15	.250	10	–	19	.345
*ineligible for postseason play due to APR penalties
† 2015 Sun Belt Conference tournament winner

The 2015 Sun Belt Conference men's basketball tournament was held in New Orleans, Louisiana from March 12 to March 15 at Lakefront Arena. The tournament winner received an automatic bid into the 2015 NCAA tournament. Opening round games were televised on ESPN3, with the championship game on ESPN2, on Sunday March 15.

== Seeds ==
Only the top eight teams advanced to the Sun Belt Conference tournament. If a team ineligible for the NCAA Tournament should finish in the top eight, its seed would fall to the next eligible team. Teams were seeded based on conference record with a tie breaker system used to separate teams who are tied. The top two seeds received a double bye, and the third and fourth seeds received a single bye.

Seed	School	Conference	Overall	Tiebreaker
1	Georgia State‡*	15–5	22–9	
2	Georgia Southern*	14–6	21–8	1–1 vs. Louisiana–Lafayette
3	UL Monroe#	14–6	20–11	0–2 vs. Louisiana–Lafayette
4	LA-Lafayette#	13–7	19–12	
5	Texas- Arlington	10–10	16–14	
6	South Alabama	9–11	11–20	
7	UALR	8–12	13–17	
8	Texas State	7–13	13–16	
‡ – Sun Belt Conference regular season champions. * – Received a first-round and second-round bye in the conference tournament. # – Received a first-round bye in the conference tournament. Overall record are as of the end of the regular season.

== Schedule ==
Session	Game	Time*	Matchup^{#}	Television
First round – Thursday, March 12
1	1	5:00 pm	#5 UT–Arlington 62 vs. #8 Texas State 68	ESPN3
1	2	7:30 pm	#6 South Alabama 57 vs. #7 Arkansas–Little Rock 55	ESPN3
Quarterfinals – Friday, March 13
2	3	5:00 pm	#4 UL–Lafayette 53 vs. #8 Texas State 43	ESPN3
2	4	7:30 pm	#3 UL–Monroe 77 vs. #6 South Alabama 59	ESPN3
Semifinals – Saturday, March 14
3	5	1:00 pm	#1 Georgia State 83 vs. #4 UL–Lafayette 79	ESPN3
3	6	4:30 pm	#2 Georgia Southern 44 vs. #3 UL–Monroe 43	ESPN3
Championship – Sunday, March 15
4	7	12:00 pm	#1 Georgia State 38 vs #2 Georgia Southern 36	ESPN2
*Game times in CST. #-Rankings denote tournament seeding.

== Bracket ==
First round Thursday, March 12; ESPN3
5	UT-Arlington	62
8	Texas State	68
6	South Alabama	57
7	UALR	55

Quarterfinals; Friday, March 13; ESPN3
4	UL-Lafayette	53
8	Texas State	43
3	UL–Monroe	77
6	South Alabama	59

Semifinals; Saturday, March 14; ESPN3
1	Georgia State	83
4	UL-Lafayette	79
2	Georgia Southern	44
3	UL–Monroe	43

Championship; Sunday, March 15; ESPN2
1	Georgia State	38
2	Georgia Southern	36

== See also ==
2015 Sun Belt Conference women's basketball tournament
