= 2014–15 Arkansas–Little Rock Trojans men's basketball team =

American college basketball season

2014–15 Arkansas–Little Rock Trojans men's basketball
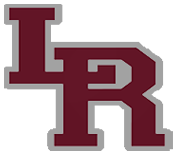
- Conference: Sun Belt Conference
- Record: 13–18 (8–12 Sun Belt)
- Head coach: Steve Shields (12th season)
- Assistant coaches: Joe Kleine; Ted Crass; Charles Cunningham
- Home arena: Jack Stephens Center

2014–15 Sun Belt Conference men's basketball standings
	Conf.				Overall
Team	W		L	PCT	W		L	PCT
Georgia State †	15	–	5	.750	25	–	10	.714
Georgia Southern	14	–	6	.700	22	–	9	.710
Louisiana–Monroe	14	–	6	.700	24	–	14	.632
Louisiana–Lafayette	13	–	7	.650	22	–	14	.611
Texas–Arlington	10	–	10	.500	16	–	15	.516
Appalachian State*	9	–	11	.450	12	–	17	.414
South Alabama	9	–	11	.450	12	–	21	.364
Arkansas–Little Rock	8	–	12	.400	13	–	18	.419
Texas State	7	–	13	.350	14	–	17	.452
Arkansas State	6	–	14	.300	11	–	18	.379
Troy	5	–	15	.250	10	–	19	.345
† 2015 Sun Belt Conference tournament winner *ineligible for postseason play due to APR penalties

The 2014–15 Arkansas–Little Rock Trojans men's basketball team represented the University of Arkansas at Little Rock during the 2014–15 NCAA Division I men's basketball season. The Trojans, led by twelfth-year head coach Steve Shields, played their home games at the Jack Stephens Center, and were members of the Sun Belt Conference. They finished the season 13–18, 8–12 in Sun Belt play to finish in eighth place. They lost in the first round of the Sun Belt tournament to South Alabama.

On March 18, 2015, head coach Steve Shields was fired. He had compiled a record of 192–178 in eight seasons. In early April, the school hired Chris Beard as head coach.

== Roster ==
2015–16 Little Rock Trojans men's basketball team
Players
Coaches

Pos.	#	Name	Height	Weight	Year	Hometown
F	0	Roger Woods	6 ft 5 in (1.96 m)	230 lb (104 kg)	Jr	Jackson, MS
G/F	1	Andre Brown	6 ft 6 in (1.98 m)	210 lb (95 kg)	Jr	Clarksville, TN
G	2	Jerron Washington	6 ft 4 in (1.93 m)	190 lb (86 kg)	Jr	Memphis, TN
G	3	Josh Hagins	6 ft 1 in (1.85 m)	180 lb (82 kg)	Jr	Bossier City, LA
G	5	Kemy Osse	6 ft 1 in (1.85 m)	208 lb (94 kg)	Jr	Montreal, Quebec

Head coach

- Steve Shields (Texas)

Assistant coach(es)

- Wes Flanigan
- Brian Burg
- Mark Adams

Legend

- (C) Team captain
- (S) Suspended
- (I) Ineligible
- (W) Walk-on
- Injured
- Current redshirt

Roster
Last update: August 22, 2014

Number	Name	Position	Height	Weight	Year	Hometown
5	Kemy Osse	Guard	6–1	208	Junior	Montreal, Quebec
10	Maurius Hill	Forward	6–5	220	Sophomore	Homewood, Illinois
11	DeVonte Smith	Guard	5–11	170	Senior	Oklahoma City, Oklahoma
12	Jushun Blackmon	Forward	6–6	210	Junior	Little Rock, Arkansas
14	J.T. Thomas	Guard	6–1	185	Junior	New Orleans, Louisiana
15	Stetson Billings	Forward	6–5	195	Junior	Strong, Arkansas
20	Ben Marcus	Guard/forward	6–5	200	Freshman	Pine Bluff, Arkansas
21	Mareik Isom	Guard/forward	6–7	215	Sophomore	Austin, Texas
22	James Reid	Guard	6–3	200	Junior	Bend, Oregon
24	Ben Dillard	Guard	6–2	185	Senior	Frisco, Texas
33	James White	Forward	6–8	220	Junior	Jonesboro, Georgia
55	Gus Leeper	Forward	6–10	23t	Senior	Austin, Texas

== Schedule ==
Date time, TV	Opponent	Result	Record	Site (attendance) city, state
Regular season
11/16/2014*; 2:00 pm	UA–Monticello	W 77–64	1–0	Jack Stephens Center (946); Little Rock, AR
11/18/2014*; 8:00 pm	at BYU; Maui Invitational	L 62–91	1–1	Marriott Center (12,469); Provo, UT
11/22/2014*; 3:30 pm	UMKC; Maui Invitational	W 73–68	2–1	Jack Stephens Center (647); Little Rock, AR
11/23/2014*; 11:00 am	Cal State Northridge; Maui Invitational	W 94–88 ^{2OT}	3–1	Jack Stephens Center (549); Little Rock, AR
11/29/2014*; 3:00 pm	Central Arkansas	W 85–71	4–1	Jack Stephens Center (1,060); Little Rock, AR
12/04/2014*; 7:00 pm	at Missouri State	L 68–73	4–2	JQH Arena (5,207); Springfield, MO
12/07/2014*; 2:00 pm	Tulsa	L 73–78	4–3	Jack Stephens Center (794); Little Rock, AR
12/14/2014*; 2:00 pm	Kent State	L 55–60 ^{OT}	4–4	Jack Stephens Center (1,018); Little Rock, AR
12/21/2014*; 1:00 pm	vs. Green Bay; South Point Holiday Hoops Classic	L 46–66	4–5	South Point Arena (N/A); Enterprise, NV
12/22/2014*; 1:00 pm	vs. Bradley; South Point Holiday Hoops Classic	W 64–54	5–5	South Point Arena (N/A); Enterprise, NV
12/30/2014; 7:30 pm	Louisiana–Lafayette	L 79–83 ^{OT}	5–6 (0–1)	Jack Stephens Center (N/A); Little Rock, AR
01/03/2015; 1:00 pm	at Georgia State	L 69–82	5–7 (0–2)	GSU Sports Arena (1,269); Atlanta, GA
01/05/2015; 7:30 pm	South Alabama	L 69–72	5–8 (0–3)	Jack Stephens Center (1,010); Little Rock, AR
01/08/2015; 7:30 pm	at Texas State	L 74–77 ^{2OT}	5–9 (0–4)	Strahan Coliseum (1,404); San Marcos, TX
01/10/2015; 5:00 pm	Appalachian State	W 64–46	6–9 (1–4)	Jack Stephens Center (1,482); Little Rock, AR
01/17/2015; 4:00 pm	at Louisiana–Monroe	L 52–64	6–10 (1–5)	Fant–Ewing Coliseum (1,793); Monroe, LA
01/19/2015; 7:00 pm	at South Alabama	L 64–66	6–11 (1–6)	Mitchell Center (2,046); Mobile, AL
01/22/2015; 7:30 pm	Troy	W 73–65	7–11 (2–6)	Jack Stephens Center (1,281); Little Rock, AR
01/24/2015; 5:00 pm	UT Arlington	L 68–75	7–12 (2–7)	Jack Stephens Center (N/A); Little Rock, AR
01/29/2015; 7:30 pm	at Arkansas State	W 75–65	8–12 (3–7)	Convocation Center (3,104); Jonesboro, AR
01/31/2015; 7:30 pm	at Georgia Southern	L 61–76	8–13 (3–8)	Hanner Fieldhouse (N/A); Statesboro, GA
02/05/2015; 7:30 pm	Louisiana–Monroe	L 61–77	8–14 (3–9)	Jack Stephens Center (1,676); Little Rock, AR
02/07/2015; 5:00 pm	Texas State	W 69–61	9–14 (4–9)	Jack Stephens Center (1,788); Little Rock, AR
02/12/2015; 6:30 pm	at Appalachian State	W 79–74	10–14 (5–9)	Holmes Center (1,187); Boone, NC
02/14/2015; 5:00 pm	Georgia Southern	L 70–72 ^{OT}	10–15 (5–10)	Jack Stephens Center (1,323); Little Rock, AR
02/19/2015; 7:30 pm	Arkansas State	W 70–57	11–15 (6–10)	Jack Stephens Center (3,629); Little Rock, AR
02/21/2015; 4:15 pm	at Troy	W 63–58	12–15 (7–10)	Trojan Arena (1,762); Troy, AL
02/26/2015; 7:30 pm	Georgia State	W 92–83	13–15 (8–10)	Jack Stephens Center (1,879); Little Rock, AR
02/28/2015; 7:15 pm, ESPN3	at UT Arlington	L 73–82	13–16 (8–11)	College Park Center (2,512); Arlington, TX
03/05/2015; 7:15 pm	at Louisiana–Lafayette	L 69–75	13–17 (8–12)	Cajundome (4,134); Lafayette, LA
Sun Belt tournament
03/12/2015; 7:30 pm	vs. South Alabama; First round	L 55–57	13–18	Lakefront Arena (N/A); New Orleans, LA
*Non-conference game. ^{#}Rankings from AP Poll. (#) Tournament seedings in parentheses. All times are in Central Time.
