= 2014–15 Appalachian State Mountaineers men's basketball team =

American college basketball season

2014–15 Appalachian State Mountaineers men's basketball
- Conference: Sun Belt Conference
- Record: 12–17 (9–11 Sun Belt)
- Head coach: Jim Fox (1st season)
- Assistant coaches: Jason Allison; Bryan Lentz; Mantoris Robinson
- Home arena: George M. Holmes Convocation Center

2014–15 Sun Belt Conference men's basketball standings
	Conf.				Overall
Team	W		L	PCT	W		L	PCT
Georgia State †	15	–	5	.750	25	–	10	.714
Georgia Southern	14	–	6	.700	22	–	9	.710
Louisiana–Monroe	14	–	6	.700	24	–	14	.632
Louisiana–Lafayette	13	–	7	.650	22	–	14	.611
Texas–Arlington	10	–	10	.500	16	–	15	.516
Appalachian State*	9	–	11	.450	12	–	17	.414
South Alabama	9	–	11	.450	12	–	21	.364
Arkansas–Little Rock	8	–	12	.400	13	–	18	.419
Texas State	7	–	13	.350	14	–	17	.452
Arkansas State	6	–	14	.300	11	–	18	.379
Troy	5	–	15	.250	10	–	19	.345
† 2015 Sun Belt Conference tournament winner *ineligible for postseason play due to APR penalties

The 2014–15 Appalachian State Mountaineers men's basketball team represented Appalachian State University during the 2014–15 NCAA Division I men's basketball season. The Mountaineers, led by first year head coach Jim Fox, played their home games at the George M. Holmes Convocation Center and were first year members of the Sun Belt Conference. They finished the season 11–7, 9–11 in Sun Belt play to finish in a tie for sixth place.

Due to low APR scores, the Mountaineers were banned from postseason play, including the Sun Belt Tournament.

== Roster ==
Number	Name	Position	Height	Weight	Year	Hometown
0	Mike Kobani	Forward	6–8	260	Sophomore	Bida, Nigeria
1	Landon Goesling	Guard	6–2	155	Freshman	Irving, Texas
2	Tab Hamilton	Guard	6–3	185	Senior	Winston-Salem, North Carolina
3	Dustin Clarke	Guard	6–3	180	Junior	Greensboro, North Carolina
4	Michael Obacha	Forward	6–8	220	Junior	Edo State, Nigeria
10	Chris Burgess	Guard	5–8	170	Junior	Lakeland, Florida
12	Rantavious Gilbert	Forward	6–9	235	Junior	Albany, Georgia
14	Milos Kostic	Forward	6–8	235	Freshman	Hammond, Indiana
15	Tommy Spagnolo	Forward	6–7	225	Senior	West Jefferson, North Carolina
20	Dylan Hodson	Guard	6–3	180	Freshman	Roanoke, Virginia
21	Frank Eaves	Guard	6–2	175	Junior	Greensboro, North Carolina
23	Logan Jackson	Guard	5–11	165	Freshman	Waxhaw, North Carolina
24	Jalen Sanders	Guard	5–10	150	Freshman	Charlotte, North Carolina
25	Jake Babic	Guard	6–5	180	Freshman	Oakville, Ontario, Canada
34	Jacob Lawson	Guard	6–8	230	Junior	Reidsville, North Carolina

== Schedule ==
Date time, TV	Opponent	Result	Record	Site (attendance) city, state
Exhibition
11/06/2014*; 7:00 pm	Lees–McRae	W 71–69		Holmes Center (1,601); Boone, NC
Regular season
11/15/2014*; 2:00 pm	at Ohio	L 47–73	0–1	Convocation Center (7,115); Athens, OH
11/19/2014*; 7:00 pm	at Furman	L 65–84	0–2	Timmons Arena (1,003); Greenville, SC
11/22/2014*; 1:00 pm, ESPN3	at Virginia Tech	W 65–63	1–2	Cassell Coliseum (2,970); Blacksburg, VA
11/24/2014*; 7:00 pm	Hampton	W 82–74	2–2	Holmes Center (1,539); Boone, NC
12/04/2014*; 7:00 pm	at Jacksonville	W 67–56	3–2	Jacksonville Veterans Memorial Arena (397); Jacksonville, FL
12/07/2014*; 7:00 pm	Hofstra	L 51–68	3–3	Holmes Center (1,254); Boone, NC
12/15/2014*; 7:00 pm, ESPN3	at Georgia Tech	L 57–70	3–4	Hank McCamish Pavilion (4,961); Atlanta, GA
12/18/2014*; 8:00 pm	at Charlotte	L 65–75	3–5	Dale F. Halton Arena (4,237); Charlotte, NC
12/21/2014*; 6:30 pm, SECN	at Alabama	L 59–60	3–6	Coleman Coliseum (9,515); Tuscaloosa, AL
01/03/2015; 8:00 pm	at Arkansas State	W 74–73	4–6 (1–0)	Convocation Center (1,628); Jonesboro, AR
01/05/2015; 7:30 pm	Louisiana–Lafayette	L 64–80	4–7 (1–1)	Holmes Center (1,004); Boone, NC
01/08/2015; 8:30 pm	at South Alabama	L 95–104	4–8 (1–2)	Mitchell Center (1,448); Mobile, AL
01/10/2015; 6:00 pm	at Arkansas–Little Rock	L 46–64	4–9 (1–3)	Jack Stephens Center (1,482); Little Rock, AR
01/15/2015; 7:30 pm	Arkansas State	L 50–59	4–10 (1–4)	Holmes Center (1,685); Boone, NC
01/17/2015; 3:30 pm	Georgia State	W 74–69	5–10 (2–4)	Holmes Center (2,622); Boone, NC
01/19/2015; 8:30 pm	at Troy	W 69–64	6–10 (3–4)	Trojan Arena (1,763); Troy, AL
01/22/2015; 7:30 pm	South Alabama	W 64–53	7–10 (4–4)	Holmes Center (1,521); Boone, NC
01/24/2015; 5:30 pm	at Texas State	W 64–58	8–10 (5–4)	Strahan Coliseum (2,407); San Marcos, TX
01/29/2015; 7:30 pm	at Georgia Southern	L 46–83	8–11 (5–5)	Hanner Fieldhouse (3,217); Statesboro, GA
02/05/2015; 8:15 pm	at Louisiana–Lafayette	L 66–81	8–12 (5–6)	Cajundome (4,080); Lafayette, LA
02/07/2015; 3:30 pm	Troy	W 65–62	9–12 (6–6)	Holmes Center (2,337); Boone, NC
02/12/2015; 7:30 pm	Arkansas–Little Rock	L 74–79	9–13 (6–7)	Holmes Center (1,187); Boone, NC
02/14/2015; 5:00 pm	at Louisiana–Monroe	L 58–69	9–14 (6–8)	Fant–Ewing Coliseum (1,388); Monroe, LA
02/19/2015; 8:15 pm	at UT Arlington	L 68–81	9–15 (6–9)	College Park Center (2,771); Arlington, TX
02/21/2015; 2:00 pm	at Georgia State	L 43–87	9–16 (6–10)	GSU Sports Arena (1,860); Atlanta, GA
02/26/2015; 7:30 pm	Georgia Southern	L 58–77	9–17 (6–11)	Holmes Center (1,684); Boone, NC
02/28/2015; 3:30 pm	Louisiana–Monroe	W 66–43	10–17 (7–11)	Holmes Center (1,941); Boone, NC
03/05/2015; 7:30 pm	Texas State	W 67–64	11–17 (8–11)	Holmes Center (1,286); Boone, NC
03/07/2015; 3:30 pm	UT Arlington	W 72–60	12–17 (9–11)	Holmes Center (1,362); Boone, NC
*Non-conference game. ^{#}Rankings from AP Poll. (#) Tournament seedings in parentheses. All times are in Eastern Time.
