= 2014–15 Texas State Bobcats men's basketball team =

American college basketball season

2014–15 Texas State Bobcats men's basketball
- Conference: Sun Belt Conference
- Record: 14–17 (7–13 Sun Belt)
- Head coach: Danny Kaspar (2nd season)
- Assistant coaches: Rob Flaska; Terrence Rencher; Jim Shaw
- Home arena: Strahan Coliseum

2014–15 Sun Belt Conference men's basketball standings
	Conf.				Overall
Team	W		L	PCT	W		L	PCT
Georgia State †	15	–	5	.750	25	–	10	.714
Georgia Southern	14	–	6	.700	22	–	9	.710
Louisiana–Monroe	14	–	6	.700	24	–	14	.632
Louisiana–Lafayette	13	–	7	.650	22	–	14	.611
Texas–Arlington	10	–	10	.500	16	–	15	.516
Appalachian State*	9	–	11	.450	12	–	17	.414
South Alabama	9	–	11	.450	12	–	21	.364
Arkansas–Little Rock	8	–	12	.400	13	–	18	.419
Texas State	7	–	13	.350	14	–	17	.452
Arkansas State	6	–	14	.300	11	–	18	.379
Troy	5	–	15	.250	10	–	19	.345
† 2015 Sun Belt Conference tournament winner *ineligible for postseason play due to APR penalties

The 2014–15 Texas State Bobcats men's basketball team represented Texas State University during the 2014–15 NCAA Division I men's basketball season. The Bobcats, led by second year head coach Danny Kaspar, played their home games at Strahan Coliseum and were members of the Sun Belt Conference. They finished the season 14–17, 7–13 to finish in ninth place. They advanced to the quarterfinals of the Sun Belt tournament where they lost to Louisiana–Lafayette.

== Roster ==
Number	Name	Position	Height	Weight	Year	Hometown
0	D.J. Brown	Guard	6–2	185	Senior	Los Angeles, California
1	Kavin Gilder-Tilbury	Forward	6–7	210	Sophomore	Houston, Texas
2	Jonathan Wiley	Guard	6–5	190	Freshman	Houston, Texas
5	Ojai Black	Guard	6–1	195	Sophomore	Killeen, Texas
10	Wesley Davis	Guard	6–3	185	Senior	Arlington, Texas
15	Ethan Montalvo	Guard	6–0	175	Junior	Omaha, Nebraska
21	Emani Gant	Forward	6–8	225	Junior	Los Angeles, California
22	Victor Bermudez	Guard	6–4	170	Senior	North Las Vegas, Nevada
23	JaMarcus Weatherspoon	Guard	6–4	185	Junior	Baton Rouge, Louisiana
24	Cameron Naylon	Forward	6–7	195	Junior	Jacksonville, Florida
31	Austin Evans	Forward	6–11	225	Freshman	Plano, Texas
32	Kendell Ramlal	Forward	6–7	217	Sophomore	Houston, Texas
33	Ed Seay	Forward	6–8	220	Sophomore	Merrillville, Indiana
34	Brian Herring	Guard	6–3	180	Freshman	San Antonio, Texas

== Schedule ==
Date time, TV	Opponent	Result	Record	Site (attendance) city, state
Exhibition
11/07/2014*; 7:00 pm	Texas Wesleyan	W 76–57		Strahan Coliseum (1,782); San Marcos, Texas
Regular season
11/14/2014*; 9:00 pm	at Seattle	W 62–53	1–0	KeyArena (3,250); Seattle, Washington
11/19/2014*; 7:00 pm	Lamar	W 65–55	2–0	Strahan Coliseum (1,634); San Marcos, Texas
11/22/2014*; 2:00 pm	at UTSA	L 67–89	2–1	Convocation Center (1,116); San Antonio, Texas
11/30/2014*; 4:00 pm	Howard Payne	W 68–39	3–1	Strahan Coliseum (1,137); San Marcos, Texas
12/03/2014*; 7:00 pm	Texas Lutheran	W 72–31	4–1	Strahan Coliseum (1,418); San Marcos, Texas
12/06/2014*; 4:00 pm	Prairie View A&M	W 81–65	5–1	Strahan Coliseum (1,457); San Marcos, Texas
12/13/2014*; 7:00 pm, LHN	at No. 8 Texas	L 27–59	5–2	Frank Erwin Center (10,452); Austin, Texas
12/17/2014*; 7:00 pm	at Stephen F. Austin	L 60–66	5–3	William R. Johnson Coliseum (3,749); Nacogdoches, Texas
12/20/2014*; 4:00 pm	Huston–Tillotson	W 90–56	6–3	Strahan Coliseum (1,208); San Marcos, Texas
12/30/2014; 7:30 pm	at Troy	W 57–46	7–3 (1–0)	Trojan Arena (1,578); Troy, Alabama
01/03/2015; 7:00 pm	at Georgia Southern	L 36–40	7–4 (1–1)	Hanner Fieldhouse (1,133); Statesboro, Georgia
01/05/2015; 6:00 pm	at Georgia State	W 77–74 ^{2OT}	8–4 (2–1)	GSU Sports Arena (1,146); Atlanta, Georgia
01/08/2015; 7:30 pm	Arkansas–Little Rock	W 77–74 ^{2OT}	9–4 (3–1)	Strahan Coliseum (1,404); San Marcos, Texas
01/10/2015; 4:30 pm	Louisiana–Monroe	L 59–62	9–5 (3–2)	Strahan Coliseum (1,612); San Marcos, Texas
01/15/2015; 7:30 pm	South Alabama	W 82–71	10–5 (4–2)	Strahan Coliseum (1,697); San Marcos, Texas
01/17/2015; 7:00 pm, ESPN3	at Arkansas State	L 73–78 ^{OT}	10–6 (4–3)	Convocation Center (2,219); Jonesboro, Arkansas
01/19/2015; 7:15 pm	at UT Arlington	L 55–66	10–7 (4–4)	College Park Center (2,306); Arlington, Texas
01/22/2015; 7:30 pm	Georgia Southern	L 43–45	10–8 (4–5)	Strahan Coliseum (3,275); San Marcos, Texas
01/24/2015; 4:30 pm	Appalachian State	L 58–64	10–9 (4–6)	Strahan Coliseum (2,407); San Marcos, Texas
01/31/2015; 4:30 pm	Louisiana–Lafayette	L 63–72	10–10 (4–7)	Strahan Coliseum (3,228); San Marcos, Texas
02/04/2015; 7:30 pm	at South Alabama	W 63–43	11–10 (5–7)	Mitchell Center (1,637); Mobile, Alabama
02/07/2015; 5:00 pm	at Arkansas–Little Rock	L 61–69	11–11 (5–8)	Jack Stephens Center (1,788); Little Rock, Arkansas
02/12/2015; 7:30 pm	UT Arlington	L 61–70	11–12 (5–9)	Strahan Coliseum (2,201); San Marcos, Texas
02/14/2015; 4:30 pm, ESPN2	Georgia State	L 41–53	11–13 (5–10)	Strahan Coliseum (N/A); San Marcos, Texas
02/19/2015; 7:15 pm	at Louisiana–Lafayette	L 42–64	11–14 (5–11)	Cajundome (3,879); Lafayette, Louisiana
02/26/2015; 7:30 pm	Troy	W 67–61	12–14 (6–11)	Strahan Coliseum (2,278); San Marcos, Texas
02/28/2015; 4:30 pm	Arkansas State	W 70–60	13–14 (7–11)	Strahan Coliseum (2,492); San Marcos, Texas
03/05/2015; 6:30 pm	at Appalachian State	L 64–67	13–15 (7–12)	Holmes Center (1,286); Boone, North Carolina
03/07/2015; 4:00 pm	at Louisiana–Monroe	L 53–56	13–16 (7–13)	Fant–Ewing Coliseum (1,849); Monroe, Louisiana
Sun Belt tournament
03/12/2015; 6:00 pm	vs. UT Arlington; First round	W 68–62	14–16	Lakefront Arena (N/A); New Orleans, Louisiana
03/13/2015; 6:00 pm	vs. Louisiana–Lafayette; Quarterfinals	L 43–53	14–17	Lakefront Arena (N/A); New Orleans, Louisiana
*Non-conference game. ^{#}Rankings from AP Poll. (#) Tournament seedings in parentheses. All times are in Central Time.
