= 2014–15 Arkansas State Red Wolves men's basketball team =

American college basketball season

2014–15 Arkansas State Red Wolves men's basketball
- Conference: Sun Belt Conference
- Record: 11–18 (6–14 Sun Belt)
- Head coach: John Brady (7th season)
- Assistant coaches: Melvin Haralson; Carlos Wilson; Mike Scutero
- Home arena: Convocation Center

2014–15 Sun Belt Conference men's basketball standings
	Conf.				Overall
Team	W		L	PCT	W		L	PCT
Georgia State †	15	–	5	.750	25	–	10	.714
Georgia Southern	14	–	6	.700	22	–	9	.710
Louisiana–Monroe	14	–	6	.700	24	–	14	.632
Louisiana–Lafayette	13	–	7	.650	22	–	14	.611
Texas–Arlington	10	–	10	.500	16	–	15	.516
Appalachian State*	9	–	11	.450	12	–	17	.414
South Alabama	9	–	11	.450	12	–	21	.364
Arkansas–Little Rock	8	–	12	.400	13	–	18	.419
Texas State	7	–	13	.350	14	–	17	.452
Arkansas State	6	–	14	.300	11	–	18	.379
Troy	5	–	15	.250	10	–	19	.345
† 2015 Sun Belt Conference tournament winner *ineligible for postseason play due to APR penalties

The 2014–15 Arkansas State Red Wolves men's basketball team represented Arkansas State University during the 2014–15 NCAA Division I men's basketball season. The Red Wolves, led by seventh year head coach John Brady, played their home games at the Convocation Center, and were members of the Sun Belt Conference. They finished the season 11–18, 6–14 in Sun Belt play to finish in tenth place. They failed to qualify for the Sun Belt tournament.

== Roster ==
Number	Name	Position	Height	Weight	Year	Hometown
0	Daijon Macklien	Guard	6–1	195	Sophomore	Los Angeles, California
1	Cameron Golden	Guard	6–0	158	Junior	Memphis, Tennessee
2	Connor Kern	Guard	6–4	189	Freshman	Pickerington, Ohio
4	Josh Pierre	Guard	6–0	184	Junior	Baton Rouge, Louisiana
5	P.J. Hardwick	Guard	5–10	167	Sophomore	Miami, Florida
10	Frederic Dure	Guard	6–5	165	Junior	Montreal, Quebec, Canada
11	Charles Waters	Guard	6–6	186	Junior	Memphis, Tennessee
12	Sean Gardner	Guard	6–5	178	Junior	Memphis, Tennessee
13	C.J. Foster	Guard	6–3	180	Sophomore	Lilburn, Georgia
14	Kelvin Downs	Forward	6–9	230	Junior	Arlington, Texas
20	Josh Bowling	Forward	6–5	205	Freshman	Benton, Arkansas
22	Tyler Cordoni	Forward	6–7	225	Sophomore	Kailua, Hawaiʻi
24	Anthony Livinigston	Forward	6–9	230	Sophomore	Washington, D.C.
25	Ronnie White	Forward	6–9	235	Junior	Chicago, Illinois
31	Devin Carter	Guard	6–4	209	Junior	Champaign, Illinois
33	Nouhoum Bocoum	Center	6–10	270	Junior	Harlem, New York

== Schedule ==
Date time, TV	Opponent	Result	Record	Site (attendance) city, state
Exhibition
11/05/2014*; 7:00 pm	Henderson State	W 84–64		Convocation Center; Jonesboro, AR
11/12/2014*; 7:00 pm	Southern Arkansas	L 67–69		Convocation Center (1,469); Jonesboro, AR
Regular season
11/17/2014*; 7:00 pm	Tennessee–Martin	L 73–75	0–1	Convocation Center (2,267); Jonesboro, AR
11/25/2014*; 7:00 pm	Lamar	L 58–63	0–2	Convocation Center (1,534); Jonesboro, AR
12/01/2014*; 7:00 pm	at Central Arkansas	W 67–49	1–2	Farris Center (1,734); Conway, AR
12/06/2014*; 7:00 pm	Belhaven	W 95–68	2–2	Convocation Center (1,406); Jonesboro, AR
12/10/2014*; 6:00 pm	at Purdue	L 46–87	2–3	Mackey Arena (9,964); West Lafayette, IN
12/13/2014*; 6:00 pm	at Toledo	L 65–73	2–4	Savage Arena (4,445); Toledo, OH
12/17/2014*; 6:00 pm, SECN	at Mississippi State	W 69–55	3–4	Humphrey Coliseum (5,390); Starkville, MS
12/20/2014*; 2:00 pm	Marshall	W 67–58	4–4	Convocation Center (1,781); Jonesboro, AR
12/23/2014*; 6:00 pm	at Niagara	W 74–69	5–4	Gallagher Center (909); Lewiston, NY
12/30/2014; 7:00 pm	at South Alabama	W 63–60 ^{OT}	6–4 (1–0)	Mitchell Center (1,682); Mobile, AL
01/03/2015; 7:00 pm	Appalachian State	L 73–74	6–5 (1–1)	Convocation Center (1,628); Jonesboro, AR
01/05/2015; 7:00 pm	at Louisiana–Monroe	L 61–70	6–6 (1–2)	Fant–Ewing Coliseum (1,418); Monroe, LA
01/08/2015; 7:30 pm	Georgia Southern	L 61–73	6–7 (1–3)	Convocation Center (1,645); Jonesboro, AR
01/10/2015; 7:15 pm	at UT Arlington	L 50–74	6–8 (1–4)	College Park Center (1,758); Arlington, TX
01/15/2015; 6:30 pm	at Appalachian State	W 59–50	7–8 (2–4)	Holmes Center (1,685); Boone, NC
01/17/2015; 7:00 pm	Texas State	W 78–73 ^{OT}	8–8 (3–4)	Convocation Center (2,219); Jonesboro, AR
01/19/2015; 7:30 pm	Georgia State	L 54–60	8–9 (3–5)	Convocation Center (2,016); Jonesboro, AR
01/22/2015; 7:15 pm	at Louisiana–Lafayette	L 59–96	8–10 (3–6)	Cajundome (4,080); Lafayette, LA
01/24/2015; 7:30 pm	at Troy	W 64–55	9–10 (4–6)	Trojan Arena (1,711); Troy, AL
01/29/2015; 7:30 pm	Arkansas–Little Rock	L 65–75	9–11 (4–7)	Convocation Center (3,104); Jonesboro, AR
01/31/2015; 1:00 pm	at Georgia State	L 43–74	9–12 (4–8)	GSU Sports Arena (1,564); Atlanta, GA
02/05/2015; 7:30 pm	Troy	L 64–69	9–13 (4–9)	Convocation Center (1,919); Jonesboro, AR
02/12/2015; 6:30 pm	at Georgia Southern	L 60–65	9–14 (4–10)	Hanner Fieldhouse (1,768); Statesboro, GA
02/19/2015; 7:30 pm	at Arkansas–Little Rock	L 57–70	9–15 (4–11)	Jack Stephens Center (3,629); Little Rock, AR
02/21/2015; 7:00 pm	Louisiana–Monroe	W 70–68	10–15 (5–11)	Convocation Center (1,916); Jonesboro, AR
02/26/2015; 7:30 pm	UT Arlington	W 81–80	11–15 (6–11)	Convocation Center (2,214); Jonesboro, AR
02/28/2015; 4:30 pm	at Texas State	L 60–70	11–16 (6–12)	Strahan Coliseum (2,492); San Marcos, TX
03/05/2015; 7:30 pm	South Alabama	L 76–81	11–17 (6–13)	Convocation Center (1,386); Jonesboro, AR
03/07/2015; 7:00 pm	Louisiana–Lafayette	L 57–81	11–18 (6–14)	Convocation Center (1,703); Jonesboro, AR
*Non-conference game. ^{#}Rankings from AP Poll. (#) Tournament seedings in parentheses. All times are in Central Time.
