= 2014–15 UT Arlington Mavericks men's basketball team =

American college basketball season

2014–15 Texas–Arlington Mavericks men's basketball
- Conference: Sun Belt Conference
- Record: 16–15 (10–10 Sun Belt)
- Head coach: Scott Cross (9th season)
- Assistant coaches: Greg Young; Zak Buncik; Andrae Patterson
- Home arena: College Park Center

2014–15 Sun Belt Conference men's basketball standings
	Conf.				Overall
Team	W		L	PCT	W		L	PCT
Georgia State †	15	–	5	.750	25	–	10	.714
Georgia Southern	14	–	6	.700	22	–	9	.710
Louisiana–Monroe	14	–	6	.700	24	–	14	.632
Louisiana–Lafayette	13	–	7	.650	22	–	14	.611
Texas–Arlington	10	–	10	.500	16	–	15	.516
Appalachian State*	9	–	11	.450	12	–	17	.414
South Alabama	9	–	11	.450	12	–	21	.364
Arkansas–Little Rock	8	–	12	.400	13	–	18	.419
Texas State	7	–	13	.350	14	–	17	.452
Arkansas State	6	–	14	.300	11	–	18	.379
Troy	5	–	15	.250	10	–	19	.345
† 2015 Sun Belt Conference tournament winner *ineligible for postseason play due to APR penalties

The 2014–15 Texas–Arlington Mavericks men's basketball team represented the University of Texas at Arlington during the 2014–15 NCAA Division I men's basketball season. The Mavericks, led by ninth year head coach Scott Cross, played their home games at the College Park Center and were a member of the Sun Belt Conference. The Mavericks finished the season 16–15, 10–10 in Sun Belt play to finish in fifth place. They lost in the first round of the Sun Belt tournament to Texas State.

== Roster ==
Number	Name	Position	Height	Weight	Year	Hometown
1	Erick Neal	Guard	5–11	160	Freshman	Dallas, Texas
3	Jamel Outler	Guard	6–2	183	Senior	Houston, Texas
4	Drew Charles	Guard	6–2	193	Sophomore	Azle, Texas
5	Kaelon Wilson	Guard	6–2	180	Freshman	Lancaster, Texas
10	Johnny Hill	Guard	6–3	180	Junior	Glendale Heights, Illinois
11	Brandon Williams	Forward	6–10	215	Sophomore	Houston, Texas
13	Colten Gober	Guard	5–11	170	Freshman	Colleyville, Texas
15	Kennedy Eubanks	Forward	6–6	185	Senior	Pendleton, South Carolina
20	Julian Harris	Forward	6–5	220	Freshman	Mansfield, Texas
21	Greg Gainey	Forward	6–5	212	Senior	Dayton, Ohio
22	Lonnie McClanahan	Guard	6–1	175	Senior	Oak Ridge, Tennessee
25	Kevin Hervey	Forward	6–7	210	Freshman	Arlington, Texas
30	Courtney Austin	Guard	6–0	185	Junior	Dallas, Texas
33	Nathan Hawkins	Guard	6–5	198	Sophomore	Garland, Texas
44	Anthony Walker	Forward	6–9	220	Senior	San Antonio, Texas
45	Jorge Bilbao	Forward	6–8	225	Sophomore	Bilbao, Spain

== Schedule ==
Date time, TV	Opponent	Result	Record	Site (attendance) city, state
Regular season (non-conference play)
11/14/2014*; 7:00 pm	at Bradley	W 86–75	1–0	Carver Arena (5,469); Peoria, IL
11/18/2014*; 7:00 pm	Buffalo; Cawood Ledford Classic	L 68–74	1–1	College Park Center (1,544); Arlington, TX
11/20/2014*; 9:00 pm	at Grand Canyon; Cawood Ledford Classic	W 66–64	2–1	GCU Arena (5,207); Phoenix, AZ
11/22/2014*; 7:30 pm	Houston Baptist	W 87–69	3–1	College Park Center (4,163); Arlington, TX
11/25/2014*; 6:00 pm, SECN	at No. 1 Kentucky; Cawood Ledford Classic	L 44–92	3–2	Rupp Arena (22,639); Lexington, KY
11/28/2014*; 7:00 pm	at Montana State; Cawood Ledford Classic	L 81–104	3–3	Worthington Arena (1,526); Bozeman, MT
12/02/2014*; 7:00 pm, LHN	at No. 6 Texas	L 53–63	3–4	Frank Erwin Center (8,632); Austin, TX
12/06/2014*; 2:00 pm	Weber State	W 63–56	4–4	College Park Center (1,524); Arlington, TX
12/13/2014*; 9:00 pm	at UC Irvine	W 70–62	5–4	Bren Events Center (2,067); Irvine, CA
12/20/2014*; 2:00 pm	Howard Payne	W 89–50	6–4	College Park Center (1,135); Arlington, TX
Regular season (Sun Belt Conference play)
12/30/2014; 7:15 pm	Georgia Southern	W 62–61	7–4 (1–0)	College Park Center (1,400); Arlington, TX
01/03/2015; 7:15 pm	South Alabama	W 99–87	8–4 (2–0)	College Park Center (1,503); Arlington, TX
01/05/2015; 7:30 pm	at Troy	L 66–71	8–5 (2–1)	Trojan Arena (1,611); Troy, AL
01/08/2015; 7:15 pm	Louisiana–Monroe	L 73–76 ^{OT}	8–6 (2–2)	College Park Center (1,074); Arlington, TX
01/10/2015; 7:15 pm	Arkansas State	W 77–50	9–6 (3–2)	College Park Center (1,758); Arlington, TX
01/15/2015; 6:00 pm	at Georgia State	L 62–83	9–7 (3–3)	GSU Sports Arena (2,119); Atlanta, GA
01/19/2015; 7:15 pm	Texas State	W 66–55	10–7 (4–3)	College Park Center (2,306); Arlington, TX
01/22/2015; 7:00 pm	at Louisiana–Monroe	W 61–57	11–7 (5–3)	Fant–Ewing Coliseum (1,571); Monroe, LA
01/24/2015; 5:00 pm	at Arkansas–Little Rock	W 75–68	12–7 (6–3)	Jack Stephens Center (N/A); Little Rock, AR
01/29/2015; 7:15 pm	Georgia State	L 74–88	12–8 (6–4)	College Park Center (2,262); Arlington, TX
01/31/2015; 7:15 pm	Troy	L 54–55	12–9 (6–5)	College Park Center (2,562); Arlington, TX
02/07/2015; 7:15 pm, ESPN2	at Louisiana–Lafayette	W 84–69	13–9 (7–5)	Cajundome (4,138); Lafayette, LA
02/12/2015; 7:30 pm	at Texas State	W 70–61	14–9 (8–5)	Strahan Coliseum (2,201); San Marcos, TX
02/14/2015; 4:00 pm	at South Alabama	L 91–97	14–10 (8–6)	Mitchell Center (1,125); Mobile, AL
02/19/2015; 7:15 pm	Appalachian State	W 81–68	15–10 (9–6)	College Park Center (2,771); Arlington, TX
02/21/2015; 7:15 pm	Louisiana–Lafayette	L 70–81	15–11 (9–7)	College Park Center (2,204); Arlington, TX
02/26/2015; 7:30 pm	at Arkansas State	L 80–81	15–12 (9–8)	Convocation Center (2,214); Jonesboro, AR
02/28/2015; 7:15 pm, ESPN3	Arkansas–Little Rock	W 82–73	16–12 (10–8)	College Park Center (2,512); Arlington, TX
03/05/2015; 6:30 pm	at Georgia Southern	L 64–76	16–13 (10–9)	Hanner Fieldhouse (1,776); Statesboro, GA
03/07/2015; 2:30 pm	at Appalachian State	L 60–72	16–14 (10–10	Holmes Center (1,362); Boone, NC
Sun Belt tournament
03/12/2015; 5:00 pm	vs. Texas State; First round	L 62–68	16–15	Lakefront Arena (N/A); New Orleans, LA
*Non-conference game. ^{#}Rankings from AP Poll. (#) Tournament seedings in parentheses. All times are in Central Time.

== See also ==
2014–15 Texas–Arlington Mavericks women's basketball team
