= 2014–15 Louisiana–Lafayette Ragin' Cajuns men's basketball team =

American college basketball season

2014–15 Louisiana–Lafayette Ragin' Cajuns men's basketball

CIT, Quarterfinals
- Conference: Sun Belt Conference
- Record: 22–14 (13–7 Sun Belt)
- Head coach: Bob Marlin (5th season)
- Assistant coaches: Neil Hardin; Kevin Johnson; Gus Hauser; La'Ryan Gary
- Home arena: Cajundome

2014–15 Sun Belt Conference men's basketball standings
	Conf.				Overall
Team	W		L	PCT	W		L	PCT
Georgia State †	15	–	5	.750	25	–	10	.714
Georgia Southern	14	–	6	.700	22	–	9	.710
Louisiana–Monroe	14	–	6	.700	24	–	14	.632
Louisiana–Lafayette	13	–	7	.650	22	–	14	.611
Texas–Arlington	10	–	10	.500	16	–	15	.516
Appalachian State*	9	–	11	.450	12	–	17	.414
South Alabama	9	–	11	.450	12	–	21	.364
Arkansas–Little Rock	8	–	12	.400	13	–	18	.419
Texas State	7	–	13	.350	14	–	17	.452
Arkansas State	6	–	14	.300	11	–	18	.379
Troy	5	–	15	.250	10	–	19	.345
† 2015 Sun Belt Conference tournament winner *ineligible for postseason play due to APR penalties

The 2014–15 Louisiana–Lafayette Ragin' Cajuns men's basketball team represented the University of Louisiana at Lafayette during the 2014–15 NCAA Division I men's basketball season. The Ragin' Cajuns, led by fifth year head coach Bob Marlin, played their home games at the Cajundome and were members of the Sun Belt Conference. They finished the season 22–14, 13–7 in Sun Belt play to finish in fourth place. They advanced to the semifinals of the Sun Belt tournament where they lost to Georgia State. They were invited to the CollegeInsider.com Tournament where they defeated Incarnate Word in the first round and Sam Houston State in the second round before losing in the quarterfinals to Evansville.

== Roster ==
2014–15 Louisiana–Lafayette Ragin' Cajuns Men's Basketball Roster
Number	Name	Position	Height	Weight	Year	Hometown
0	Devonta Walker	Forward	6–7	220	Junior	Salisbury, Maryland
1	Jay Wright	Guard	6–1	180	Junior	Rincon, Georgia
3	Xavian Rimmer	Guard	6–2	225	Senior	Jackson, Mississippi
4	Steven Wronkoski	Guard	6–5	190	Junior	Hammond, Louisiana
5	Kasey Shepherd	Guard	6–3	178	Junior	Houston, Texas
11	Donovan Williams	Guard	6–0	189	Senior	Cecilia, Louisiana
13	Hayward Register	Guard	6–2	170	Sophomore	Lafayette, Louisiana
15	Aaron LeBlanc	Forward	6–5	195	Senior	Charenton, Louisiana
21	Shawn Long	Forward	6–9	245	Junior	Morgan City, Louisiana
22	Johnathan Stove	Guard	6–4	215	Freshman	Baton Rouge, Louisiana
23	Tiremone Williams	Guard	6–0	180	Junior	Abbeville, Louisiana
31	Brian Williams	Forward	6–5	210	Senior	Baton Rouge, Louisiana
32	Bryce Washington	Forward	6–6	230	Freshman	New Orleans, Louisiana
33	Vieux Kande	Center	6–8	240	Sophomore	Dakar, Senegal
44	J.J. Davenport	Center	6–6	325	Senior	Abbeville, Louisiana
55	Scott Plaisance	Forward	6–9	210	Freshman	Baton Rouge, Louisiana

== Schedule ==
Date time, TV	Opponent	Result	Record	High points	High rebounds	High assists	Site (attendance) city, state
Exhibition
11/05/2014*; 7:15 pm	Loyola New Orleans	W 87–60		16 – Washington	9 – Shephard	4 – Shephard	Cajundome (2,595); Lafayette, LA
Regular season
11/14/2014*; 7:00 pm	Louisiana College	W 85–57	1–0	20 – Walker	7 – Walker	6 – Wright	Cajundome (2,979); Lafayette, LA
11/17/2014*; 8:30 pm, ESPN3	at Tulsa; MGM Grand Main Event	L 53–64	1–1	15 – Long	6 – T. Williams	3 – T. Williams	Reynolds Center (3,889); Tulsa, OK
11/21/2014*; 7:00 pm, FSN	at Auburn; MGM Grand Main Event	L 80–105	1–2	18 – B. Williams	7 – B. Williams	2 – Wright	Auburn Arena (8,120); Auburn, AL
11/24/2014*; 5:00 pm	vs. Milwaukee; MGM Grand Main Event	L 52–56	1–3	12 – Rimmer	6 – Walker	2 – Wright	MGM Grand Garden Arena (1,192); Paradise, NV
11/25/2014*; 8:00 pm	vs. Oral Roberts; MGM Grand Main Event	W 76–52	2–3	22 – Shephard	7 – B. Williams	5 – Shephard	MGM Grand Garden Arena (N/A); Paradise, NV
12/03/2014*; 7:00 pm	Jackson State	W 76–53	3–3	19 – Walker	9 – Long	4 – Wright	Cajundome (3,572); Lafayette, LA
12/06/2014*; 7:00 pm	at McNeese State	L 70–79	3–4	18 – Long	11 – Long	7 – Shephard	Burton Coliseum (1,089); Lake Charles, LA
12/10/2014*; 7:00 pm	Louisiana Tech	W 94–86	4–4	24 – Long	15 – Long	5 – Shephard	Cajundome (3,786); Lafayette, LA
12/13/2014*; 2:00 pm	Centenary	W 115–59	5–4	22 – Long	8 – Walker	4 – Wright	Cajundome (3,586); Lafayette, LA
12/17/2014*; 7:00 pm	Milligan	W 115–76	6–4	26 – Long	10 – Long	5 – Wright	Cajundome (3,263); Lafayette, LA
12/20/2014*; 3:00 pm	at Northwestern State	L 85–89	6–5	23 – Walker	19 – Walker	5 – Walker	Prather Coliseum (1,240); Natchitoches, LA
12/30/2014; 7:30 pm	at Arkansas–Little Rock	W 83–79 ^{OT}	7–5 (1–0)	23 – Long	12 – Long	5 – Shephard	Jack Stephens Center (N/A); Little Rock, AR
01/03/2015; 7:15 pm	Troy	W 91–64	8–5 (2–0)	20 – Wright	6 – Shephard	4 – Walker	Cajundome (3,973); Lafayette, LA
01/05/2014; 6:30 pm	at Appalachian State	W 80–64	9–5 (3–0)	15 – B. Williams	9 – Long	4 – Walker	Holmes Center (1,004); Boone, NC
01/08/2015; 7:15 pm	Georgia State	W 84–80	10–5 (4–0)	20 – B. Williams	13 – Long	6 – Wright	Cajundome (4,531); Lafayette, LA
01/15/2014; 6:30 pm	at Georgia Southern	L 70–78	10–6 (4–1)	18 – Long	8 – Long	5 – Wright	Hanner Fieldhouse (4,325); Statesboro, GA
01/17/2015; 7:15 pm	South Alabama	L 82–89	10–7 (4–2)	22 – Long	22 – Long	4 – Washington	Cajundome (6,105); Lafayette, LA
01/19/2015; 7:15 pm	Louisiana–Monroe	L 55–57	10–8 (4–3)	19 – Long	9 – Long	5 – Wright	Cajundome (4,213); Lafayette, LA
01/22/2015; 7:15 pm	Arkansas State	W 96–59	11–8 (5–3)	27 – Long	7 – Washington	5 – Washington	Cajundome (4,080); Lafayette, LA
01/24/2015; 2:00 pm, ESPN3	at Georgia State	L 64–75	11–9 (5–4)	21 – Long	B. Williams – Long	– 3	GSU Sports Arena (2,353); Atlanta, GA
01/29/2015; 7:00 pm	at South Alabama	L 85–89	11–10 (5–5)	26 – Long	12 – Long	5 – Shephard	Mitchell Center (1,590); Mobile, AL
01/31/2015; 4:30 pm	at Texas State	W 72–63	12–10 (6–5)	19 – Stove	13 – Long	10 – Wright	Strahan Coliseum (3,228); San Marcos, TX
02/05/2015; 7:15 pm	Appalachian State	W 81–66	13–10 (7–5)	22 – Long	14 – Long	8 – Wright	Cajundome (4,080); Lafayette, LA
02/07/2015; 7:15 pm, ESPN2	UT Arlington	L 69–84	13–11 (7–6)	13 – Washington	10 – Long	5 – Stove	Cajundome (4,138); Lafayette, LA
02/12/2015; 7:00 pm	at Louisiana–Monroe	L 55–67	13–12 (7–7)	13 – Long	13 – Long	2 – Rimmer	Fant–Ewing Coliseum (3,502); Monroe, LA
02/14/2015; 4:15 pm	at Troy	W 84–80 ^{OT}	14–12 (8–7)	17 – Long	6 – B. Williams	4 – B. Williams	Trojan Arena (1,327); Troy, AL
02/19/2015; 7:15 pm	Texas State	W 64–42	15–12 (9–7)	17 – Long	8 – Walker	6 – Wright	Cajundome (3,879); Lafayette, LA
02/21/2015; 7:15 pm	at UT Arlington	W 81–70	16–12 (10–7)	21 – Long	15 – Long	7 – Wright	College Park Center (2,204); Arlington, TX
02/28/2015; 7:15 pm	Georgia Southern	W 68–58	17–12 (11–7)	20 – Wright	12 – Long	5 – Stove	Cajundome (3,937); Lafayette, LA
03/05/2015; 7:15 pm	Arkansas–Little Rock	W 75–69	18–12 (12–7)	15 – Walker	9 – Long	5 – Stove	Cajundome (4,134); Lafayette, LA
03/07/2015; 7:00 pm	at Arkansas State	W 81–57	19–12 (13–7)	19 – Register	12 – Long	6 – Washington	Convocation Center (1,703); Jonesboro, AR
Sun Belt tournament
03/13/2015; 5:00 pm, ESPN3	vs. Texas State; Quarterfinals	W 53–43	20–12	16 – Shephard	11 – Long	4 – Long	Lakefront Arena (N/A); New Orleans, LA
03/14/2015; 1:00 pm, ESPN3	vs. Georgia State; Semifinals	L 79–83	20–13	17 – Walker	9 – Walker	6 – Wright	Lakefront Arena (N/A); New Orleans, LA
CIT
03/17/2015*; 7:00 pm	at Incarnate Word; First round	W 83–68	21–13	25 – Washington	9 – Long	7 – Wright	McDermott Center (1,811); San Antonio, TX
03/21/2015*; 2:00 pm	at Sam Houston State; Second round	W 71–70	22–13	19 – Wright	9 – Washington	4 – Shephard	Bernard Johnson Coliseum (772); Huntsville, TX
03/26/2015*; 7:30 pm	Evansville; Quarterfinals	L 82–89	22–14	24 – Long	11 – Long	4 – Wright	Blackham Coliseum (3,541); Lafayette, LA
*Non-conference game. ^{#}Rankings from AP Poll. (#) Tournament seedings in parentheses. All times are in Central Time.
