= 2014–15 South Alabama Jaguars men's basketball team =

American college basketball season

2014–15 South Alabama Jaguars men's basketball
- Conference: Sun Belt Conference
- Record: 12–21 (9–11 Sun Belt)
- Head coach: Matthew Graves (2nd season)
- Assistant coaches: Darnell Archey; Dan Matic; Russ Willemsen
- Home arena: Mitchell Center

2014–15 Sun Belt Conference men's basketball standings
	Conf.				Overall
Team	W		L	PCT	W		L	PCT
Georgia State †	15	–	5	.750	25	–	10	.714
Georgia Southern	14	–	6	.700	22	–	9	.710
Louisiana–Monroe	14	–	6	.700	24	–	14	.632
Louisiana–Lafayette	13	–	7	.650	22	–	14	.611
Texas–Arlington	10	–	10	.500	16	–	15	.516
Appalachian State*	9	–	11	.450	12	–	17	.414
South Alabama	9	–	11	.450	12	–	21	.364
Arkansas–Little Rock	8	–	12	.400	13	–	18	.419
Texas State	7	–	13	.350	14	–	17	.452
Arkansas State	6	–	14	.300	11	–	18	.379
Troy	5	–	15	.250	10	–	19	.345
† 2015 Sun Belt Conference tournament winner *ineligible for postseason play due to APR penalties

The 2014–15 South Alabama Jaguars basketball team represented the University of South Alabama during the 2014–15 NCAA Division I men's basketball season. The Jaguars, led by second year head coach Matthew Graves, played their home games at the Mitchell Center and were members of the Sun Belt Conference. They finished the season 12–21, 9–11 in Sun Belt play to finish in a tie for sixth place. They advanced to the quarterfinals of the Sun Belt tournament where they lost to Louisiana–Monroe.

== Roster ==
Number	Name	Position	Height	Weight	Year	Hometown
1	Ken Williams	Guard	6–2	175	Sophomore	Houston, Texas
2	Taishaun Johnson	Guard	6–0	165	Freshman	Indianapolis, Indiana
4	Barrington Stevens III	Guard	5–10	190	Junior	Allen, Texas
5	Abdul Lewis	Forward	6–9	225	Freshman	Newark, New Jersey
10	Georgi Boyanov	Forward	6–8	200	Sophomore	Lovech, Bulgaria
14	Devin Epps	Guard	5–10	160	Freshman	Murfreesboro, Tennessee
20	Tafari Whittingham	Forward	6–8	195	Junior	Brooklyn, New York
22	John Brown	Guard	6–3	190	Junior	Charlotte, North Carolina
24	Dionte Ferguson	Forward	6–6	220	Senior	Prattville, Alabama
25	Jermaine Williams	Guard	5–7	175	Senior	Saint Stephens, Alabama
32	Austin Karazsia	Forward	6–8	220	Sophomore	Linton, Indiana
33	Luka Andjusic	Guard	6–4	190	Redshirt Freshman	Belgrade, Serbia
	Nick Davis	Guard	6–5	180	Sophomore	Mt. Vernon, Alabama
	B.J. Fisher	Guard	6–3	190	Junior	Decatur, Georgia
	Nikola Marijan	Forward	7–1	230	Freshman	Backi Brestovac, Serbia
	Nick Stover	Forward	6–6	195	Junior	Los Angeles, California

== Schedule ==
Date time, TV	Opponent	Result	Record	Site (attendance) city, state
Exhibition
11/06/2014*; 7:00 pm	Mobile	W 69–52		Mitchell Center (1,616); Mobile, Alabama
Regular season
11/14/2014*; 7:00 pm	Carroll (MT)	W 83–64	1–0	Mitchell Center (1,520); Mobile, Alabama
11/17/2014*; 7:00 pm	at Southern Miss	L 59–68	1–1	Reed Green Coliseum (3,023); Hattiesburg, Mississippi
11/22/2014*; 2:00 pm, ESPN3	at Detroit	L 53–66	1–2	Calihan Hall (2,203); Detroit, Michigan
11/28/2014*; 6:00 pm, ESPN3	at No. 17 Miami (FL)	L 75–87	1–3	BankUnited Center (4,267); Coral Gables, Florida
12/02/2014*; 7:00 pm	Spring Hill	W 71–54	2–3	Mitchell Center (1,721); Mobile, Alabama
12/06/2014*; 1:00 pm	Middle Tennessee	L 67–68 ^{OT}	2–4	Mitchell Center (1,326); Mobile, Alabama
12/15/2014*; 9:00 pm	at Pepperdine; Gotham Classic	L 68–78	2–5	Firestone Fieldhouse (785); Malibu, California
12/18/2014*; 6:00 pm	at Richmond; Gotham Classic	L 54–65	2–6	Robins Center (3,857); Richmond, Virginia
12/20/2014*; 12:00 pm	at IUPUI; Gotham Classic	W 71–65 ^{OT}	2–7	Indiana Farmers Coliseum (1,582); Indianapolis, Indiana
12/23/2014*; 7:00 pm	Howard; Gotham Classic	L 60–73	2–8	Mitchell Center (1,243); Mobile, Alabama
12/30/2014; 7:00 pm	Arkansas State	L 60–63 ^{OT}	2–9 (0–1)	Mitchell Center (1,682); Mobile, Alabama
01/03/2015; 7:15 pm	at UT Arlington	L 87–99	2–10 (0–2)	College Park Center (1,503); Arlington, Texas
01/05/2015; 7:30 pm	at Arkansas–Little Rock	W 72–69	3–10 (1–2)	Jack Stephens Center (1,010); Little Rock, Arkansas
01/08/2015; 7:00 pm	Appalachian State	W 104–95	4–10 (2–2)	Mitchell Center (1,448); Mobile, Alabama
01/10/2015; 4:00 pm	Georgia Southern	L 73–81	4–11 (2–3)	Mitchell Center (1,872); Mobile, Alabama
01/15/2015; 7:30 pm	at Texas State	L 71–82	4–12 (2–4)	Strahan Coliseum (1,697); San Marcos, Texas
01/17/2015; 7:15 pm	at Louisiana–Lafayette	W 89–82	5–12 (3–4)	Cajundome (6,105); Lafayette, Louisiana
01/19/2015; 7:00 pm	Arkansas–Little Rock	W 66–64	6–12 (4–4)	Mitchell Center (2,046); Mobile, Alabama
01/22/2015; 6:30 pm	at Appalachian State	L 53–64	6–13 (4–5)	Holmes Center (1,521); Boone, North Carolina
01/25/2015*; 2:00 pm	NJIT	L 55–72	6–14	Mitchell Center (1,909); Mobile, Alabama
01/29/2015; 7:00 pm	Louisiana–Lafayette	W 89–85	7–14 (5–5)	Mitchell Center (1,590); Mobile, Alabama
01/31/2015; 4:00 pm	at Louisiana–Monroe	L 61–67	7–15 (5–6)	Fant–Ewing Coliseum (1,878); Monroe, Louisiana
02/04/2015; 7:00 pm	Texas State	L 43–63	7–16 (5–7)	Mitchell Center (1,637); Mobile, Alabama
02/07/2015; 4:00 pm	Georgia State	L 54–65	7–17 (5–8)	Mitchell Center (2,535); Mobile, Alabama
02/12/2015; 7:30 pm	at Troy	W 71–67	8–17 (6–8)	Trojan Arena (2,753); Troy, Alabama
02/14/2015; 4:00 pm	UT Arlington	W 97–91	9–17 (7–8)	Mitchell Center (1,125); Mobile, Alabama
02/19/2015; 6:00 pm	at Georgia State	L 51–79	9–18 (7–9)	GSU Sports Arena (1,992); Atlanta, Georgia
02/21/2015; 6:30 pm	at Georgia Southern	L 74–80	9–19 (7–10)	Hanner Fieldhouse (2,128); Statesboro, Georgia
02/26/2015; 7:00 pm	Louisiana–Monroe	L 57–75	9–20 (7–11)	Mitchell Center (1,834); Mobile, Alabama
03/05/2015; 7:30 pm	at Arkansas State	W 81–76	10–20 (8–11)	Convocation Center (1,386); Jonesboro, Arkansas
03/07/2015; 4:00 pm	Troy	W 96–93	11–20 (9–11)	Mitchell Center (N/A); Mobile, Alabama
Sun Belt tournament
03/12/2015; 7:30 pm	vs. Arkansas–Little Rock; First round	W 57–55	12–20	Lakefront Arena (N/A); New Orleans, Louisiana
03/13/2015; 7:30 pm	vs. Louisiana–Monroe; Quarterfinals	L 59–77	12–21	Lakefront Arena (N/A); New Orleans, Louisiana
*Non-conference game. ^{#}Rankings from AP Poll. (#) Tournament seedings in parentheses. All times are in Central Time.
