= 2014–15 Texas Longhorns men's basketball team =

American college basketball season

2014–15 Texas Longhorns men's basketball

2K Sports Classic champions

NCAA tournament, Round of 64
- Conference: Big 12
- Record: 20–14 (8–10 Big 12)
- Head coach: Rick Barnes (17th season)
- Assistant coaches: Rob Lanier; Russell Springmann; Chris Ogden
- Home arena: Frank Erwin Center

2014–15 Big 12 men's basketball standings
	Conf.				Overall
Team	W		L	PCT	W		L	PCT
No. 10 Kansas	13	–	5	.722	27	–	9	.750
No. 9 Iowa State †	12	–	6	.667	25	–	9	.735
No. 13 Oklahoma	12	–	6	.667	24	–	11	.686
No. 16 Baylor	11	–	7	.611	24	–	10	.706
No. 20 West Virginia	11	–	7	.611	25	–	10	.714
Oklahoma State	8	–	10	.444	18	–	14	.563
Texas	8	–	10	.444	20	–	14	.588
Kansas State	8	–	10	.444	15	–	17	.469
TCU	4	–	14	.222	18	–	15	.545
Texas Tech	3	–	15	.167	13	–	19	.406
† 2015 Big 12 Tournament winner Rankings from AP poll

The 2014–15 Texas Longhorns men's basketball team represented the University of Texas at Austin in the 2014–15 NCAA Division I men's basketball season. Their head coach was Rick Barnes, who was in his 17th year as head coach. The team played their home games at the Frank Erwin Center in Austin, Texas and were members of the Big 12 Conference. They finished the season 20–14, 8–10 in Big 12 play to finish in a three-way tie for sixth place. They lost in the quarterfinals of the Big 12 tournament to Iowa State. They received an at-large bid to the NCAA tournament, where they lost in the second round to Butler.

== Previous season ==
They finished the season 24–11, 11–7 in Big 12 play to finish in a tie for third place. They advanced to the semifinals of the Big 12 tournament, where they lost to Baylor. They received an at-large bid to the NCAA tournament, where they defeated Arizona State in the second round before losing in the third round to Michigan.

== Before the season ==
=== Departures ===
Name	Number	Pos.	Height	Weight	Year	Hometown	Reason for departure
Martez Walker	24	G	6'4"	185	Freshman	Detroit, MI	Suspended indefinitely

=== Recruiting ===
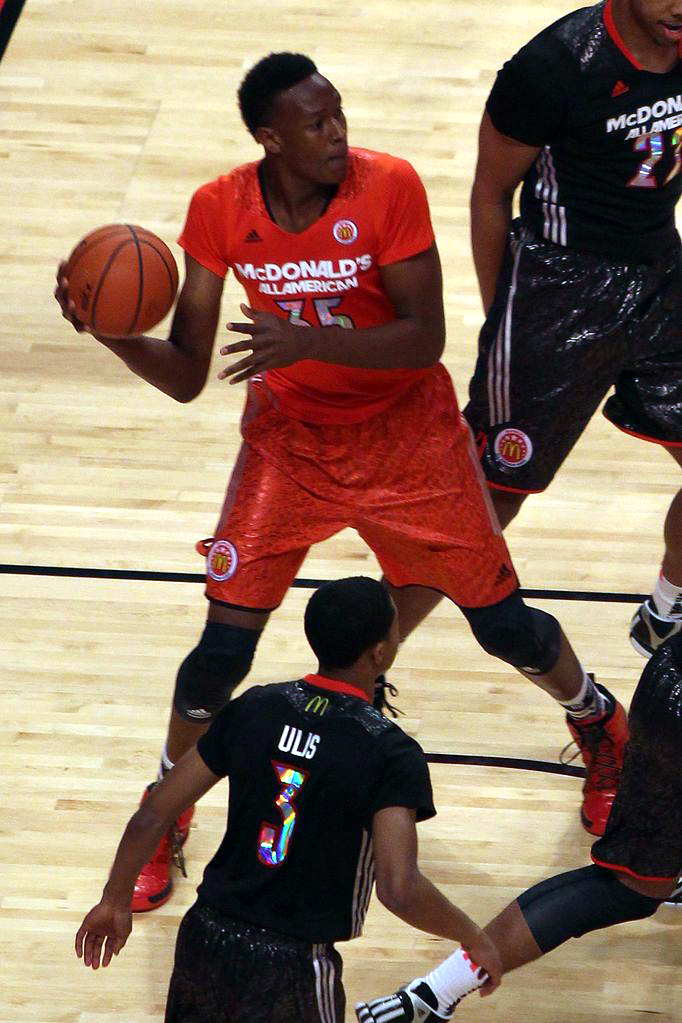
Myles Turner in the 2014 McDonald's All-American Boys Game

College recruiting
Name	Hometown	School	Height	Weight	Commit date
Obinna Oleka; PF	Washington, D.C.	State College of Florida	6 ft 8 in (2.03 m)	220 lb (100 kg)	Nov 4, 2013
Obinna Oleka; PF	Recruit ratings: Scout: Rivals: 247Sports: ESPN:				
Jordan Barnett; SF	Saint Louis, MO	Christian Brothers College High School	6 ft 7 in (2.01 m)	185 lb (84 kg)	Aug 1, 2013
Jordan Barnett; SF	Recruit ratings: Scout: Rivals: 247Sports: ESPN:				
Myles Turner; C	Bedford, TX	Trinity High School	7 ft 0 in (2.13 m)	240 lb (110 kg)	Apr 30, 2014
Myles Turner; C	Recruit ratings: Scout: Rivals: 247Sports: ESPN:				
Overall recruit ranking: Scout: NR Rivals: NR ESPN: 19
Note: In many cases, Scout, Rivals, 247Sports, On3, and ESPN may conflict in their listings of height and weight.; In these cases, the average was taken. ESPN grades are on a 100-point scale.; Sources: "Texas 2014 Basketball Commitments". Rivals.; "2014 Texas Basketball Commits". Scout.; "2014 Texas Basketball Commitments". ESPN.; "Scout.com Team Recruiting Rankings". Scout.; "2014 Team Ranking". Rivals.

== Roster ==
2014–15 Texas Longhorns men's basketball team
Players
Coaches
=

Pos.	#	Name	Height	Weight	Year	Previous school	Hometown
G	0	Kendall Yancy	6 ft 3 in (1.91 m)	200 lb (91 kg)	So	Berkner	Richardson, TX
G	1	Isaiah Taylor	6 ft 1 in (1.85 m)	170 lb (77 kg)	So	The Village School	Hayward, CA
G	2	Demarcus Holland	6 ft 2 in (1.88 m)	185 lb (84 kg)	Jr	Naaman Forest	Garland, TX
G	3	Javan Felix	5 ft 11 in (1.8 m)	195 lb (88 kg)	Jr	St. Augustine	New Orleans, LA
F	4	Danny Newsome (W)	6 ft 9 in (2.06 m)	190 lb (86 kg)	RS So	Langham Creek	Houston, TX
G	5	Damarcus Croaker	6 ft 2 in (1.88 m)	190 lb (86 kg)	So	Jones	Orlando, FL
F	10	Jonathan Holmes	6 ft 8 in (2.03 m)	240 lb (109 kg)	Sr	Antonian College Prep	San Antonio, TX
F	21	Connor Lammert	6 ft 9 in (2.06 m)	235 lb (107 kg)	Jr	Churchill	San Antonio, TX
G	22	Brandon Allums (W)	6 ft 4 in (1.93 m)	241 lb (109 kg)	Jr	Plano West	Plano, TX
G	30	Ryan McClurg (W)	6 ft 5 in (1.96 m)	225 lb (102 kg)	RS Fr	Seven Lakes	Katy, TX
F	33	Jordan Barnett	6 ft 7 in (2.01 m)	205 lb (93 kg)	Fr	Christian Brothers College High School	Saint Louis, MO
G	40	Tarale Murry (W)	6 ft 2 in (1.88 m)	187 lb (85 kg)	Sr	Lehman	San Antonio, TX
C	44	Prince Ibeh	6 ft 10 in (2.08 m)	250 lb (113 kg)	Jr	Naaman Forest	Garland, TX
C	52	Myles Turner	7 ft 0 in (2.13 m)	240 lb (109 kg)	Fr	Trinity High School	Bedford, TX
C	55	Cameron Ridley	6 ft 9 in (2.06 m)	285 lb (129 kg)	Jr	Bush	Richmond, TX

Head coach

- Rick Barnes (Lenoir–Rhyne)

Assistant coach(es)

- Rob Lanier (St. Bonaventure)
- Russell Springmann (Salisbury)
- Christopher Ogden (Texas)

Legend

- (C) Team captain
- (S) Suspended
- (I) Ineligible
- (W) Walk-on
- Injured
- Current redshirt

Roster
Last update: 2014-02-17

== Schedule ==
Date time, TV	Rank^{#}	Opponent^{#}	Result	Record	Site (attendance) city, state
Non-conference regular season
11/14/2014*; 7:00 pm, LHN	No. 10	North Dakota State; 2K Sports Classic	W 85–50	1–0	Frank Erwin Center (11,232); Austin, TX
11/16/2014*; 7:00 pm, ESPNU	No. 10	Alcorn State; 2K Sports Classic	W 85–53	2–0	Frank Erwin Center (8,463); Austin, TX
11/20/2014*; 6:00 pm, ESPN2	No. 10	vs. Iowa; 2K Sports Classic Semifinals	W 71–57	3–0	Madison Square Garden (11,541); New York City, NY
11/21/2014*; 6:30 pm, ESPN2	No. 10	vs. California; 2K Sports Classic Championship	W 71–55	4–0	Madison Square Garden (11,255); New York City, NY
11/25/2014*; 7:00 pm, LHN	No. 7	Saint Francis (PA)	W 78–46	5–0	Frank Erwin Center (9,356); Austin, TX
11/30/2014*; 11:00 am, ESPN2	No. 7	at No. 24 UConn	W 55–54	6–0	Gampel Pavilion (10,167); Storrs, CT
12/02/2014*; 7:00 pm, LHN	No. 6	UT Arlington	W 63–53	7–0	Frank Erwin Center (8,632); Austin, TX
12/05/2014*; 6:00 pm, ESPN	No. 6	at No. 1 Kentucky; Big 12/SEC Challenge	L 51–63	7–1	Rupp Arena (24,340); Lexington, KY
12/13/2014*; 7:00 pm, LHN	No. 8	Texas State	W 59–27	8–1	Frank Erwin Center (10,452); Austin, TX
12/16/2014*; 7:00 pm, LHN	No. 9	Lipscomb	W 106–61	9–1	Frank Erwin Center (8,653); Austin, TX
12/20/2014*; 7:00 pm, LHN	No. 9	Long Beach State	W 78–68	10–1	Frank Erwin Center (9,179); Austin, TX
12/23/2014*; 6:00 pm, ESPN2	No. 9	Stanford	L 71–74	10–2	Frank Erwin Center (13,661); Austin, TX
12/29/2014*; 7:00 pm, LHN	No. 11	Rice	W 66–55	11–2	Frank Erwin Center (9,373); Austin, TX
Big 12 Conference season
01/03/2015; 1:00 pm, ESPNU	No. 11	at Texas Tech	W 70–61	12–2 (1–0)	United Supermarkets Arena (9,936); Lubbock, TX
01/05/2015; 8:00 pm, ESPN	No. 10	No. 16 Oklahoma	L 49–70	12–3 (1–1)	Frank Erwin Center (12,625); Austin, TX
01/10/2015; 4:00 pm, ESPNU	No. 10	at Oklahoma State	L 58–69	12–4 (1–2)	Gallagher-Iba Arena (9,592); Stillwater, OK
01/17/2015; 5:15 pm, ESPN	No. 20	No. 16 West Virginia	W 77–50	13–4 (2–2)	Frank Erwin Center (13,204); Austin, TX
01/19/2015; 6:00 pm, ESPNU	No. 17	at TCU	W 66–48	14–4 (3–2)	Wilkerson-Greines Activity Center (5,153); Fort Worth, TX
01/24/2015; 1:00 pm, CBS	No. 17	No. 11 Kansas	L 62–75	14–5 (3–3)	Frank Erwin Center (16,540); Austin, TX
01/26/2015; 8:00 pm, ESPN	No. 19	at No. 15 Iowa State	L 86–89	14–6 (3–4)	Hilton Coliseum (14,384); Ames, IA
01/31/2015; 5:00 pm, ESPN2	No. 19	at No. 20 Baylor	L 60–83	14–7 (3–5)	Ferrell Center (9,680); Waco, TX
02/04/2015; 7:00 pm, LHN	No. 25	Oklahoma State	L 63–65	14–8 (3–6)	Frank Erwin Center (11,954); Austin, TX
02/07/2015; 3:00 pm, ESPN	No. 25	at Kansas State	W 61–57	15–8 (4–6)	Bramlage Coliseum (12,528); Manhattan, KS
02/11/2015; 7:00 pm, LHN		TCU	W 66–43	16–8 (5–6)	Frank Erwin Center (8,634); Austin, TX
02/14/2015; 7:00 pm, LHN		Texas Tech	W 56–41	17–8 (6–6)	Frank Erwin Center (13,178); Austin, TX
02/17/2015; 8:00 pm, ESPN2		at No. 17 Oklahoma	L 69–71	17–9 (6–7)	Lloyd Noble Center (11,413); Norman OK
02/21/2015; 1:00 pm, ESPN2		No. 14 Iowa State	L 77–85	17–10 (6–8)	Frank Erwin Center (13,161); Austin, TX
02/24/2015; 6:00 pm, ESPN2		at No. 20 West Virginia	L 64–71	17–11 (6–9)	WVU Coliseum (12,048); Morgantown, WV
02/28/2015; 4:00 pm, ESPN		at No. 8 Kansas; ESPN College GameDay	L 64–69	17–12 (6–10)	Allen Fieldhouse (16,300); Lawrence, KS
03/02/2015; 6:00 pm, ESPNU		No. 14 Baylor	W 61–59	18–12 (7–10)	Frank Erwin Center (12,139); Austin, TX
03/07/2015; 3:00 pm, ESPN2		Kansas State	W 62–49	19–12 (8–10)	Frank Erwin Center (12,053); Austin, TX
Big 12 tournament
03/11/2015; 8:00 pm, ESPNU		vs. Texas Tech; First round	W 65–53	20–12	Sprint Center (18,972); Kansas City, MO
03/12/2015; 6:00 pm, ESPNU		vs. No. 13 Iowa State; Quarterfinals	L 67–69	20–13	Sprint Center (18,972); Kansas City, MO
NCAA tournament
03/19/2015*; 1:45 pm, CBS	No. (11 MW)	vs. No. 24 (6 MW) Butler; Second round	L 48–56	20–14	Consol Energy Center (15,818); Pittsburgh, PA
*Non-conference game. ^{#}Rankings from AP Poll. (#) Tournament seedings in parentheses. All times are in Central Time. (#) during NCAA Tournament is seed with Region MW=Midwest.

== Rankings ==
Ranking movement Legend: ██ Increase in ranking. ██ Decrease in ranking. (RV) Received votes but unranked. (NR) Not ranked.
Poll	Pre	Wk 2	Wk 3	Wk 4	Wk 5	Wk 6	Wk 7	Wk 8	Wk 9	Wk 10	Wk 11	Wk 12	Wk 13	Wk 14	Wk 15	Wk 16	Wk 17	Wk 18	Wk 19	Final
AP	10	10	7	6	8	9	9	11	10	20	17	19	25	RV	RV	RV	NR	NR	NR	N/A
Coaches	10	10	9	7	9	9	9	10	10	20	18	20	RV	RV	RV	NR	RV	RV	RV	NR

== See also ==
- 2014–15 Texas Longhorns women's basketball team
