= 2014–15 Louisiana–Monroe Warhawks men's basketball team =

American college basketball season

2014–15 Louisiana–Monroe Warhawks men's basketball

CBI, Runner-up
- Conference: Sun Belt Conference
- Record: 24–14 (14–6 Sun Belt)
- Head coach: Keith Richard (5th season)
- Assistant coaches: Ryan Cross; Lonnie Cooper; J.A. Anglin
- Home arena: Fant–Ewing Coliseum

2014–15 Sun Belt Conference men's basketball standings
	Conf.				Overall
Team	W		L	PCT	W		L	PCT
Georgia State †	15	–	5	.750	25	–	10	.714
Georgia Southern	14	–	6	.700	22	–	9	.710
Louisiana–Monroe	14	–	6	.700	24	–	14	.632
Louisiana–Lafayette	13	–	7	.650	22	–	14	.611
Texas–Arlington	10	–	10	.500	16	–	15	.516
Appalachian State*	9	–	11	.450	12	–	17	.414
South Alabama	9	–	11	.450	12	–	21	.364
Arkansas–Little Rock	8	–	12	.400	13	–	18	.419
Texas State	7	–	13	.350	14	–	17	.452
Arkansas State	6	–	14	.300	11	–	18	.379
Troy	5	–	15	.250	10	–	19	.345
† 2015 Sun Belt Conference tournament winner *ineligible for postseason play due to APR penalties

The 2014–15 Louisiana–Monroe Warhawks men's basketball team represented the University of Louisiana at Monroe in the 2014–15 NCAA Division I men's basketball season. The Warhawks, led by fifth year head coach Keith Richard, played their home games at Fant–Ewing Coliseum and were members of the Sun Belt Conference. They finished the season 24–14, 14–6 in Sun Belt play to finish in a tie for second place. They advanced to the semifinals of the Sun Belt tournament where they lost to Georgia Southern. They were invited to the College Basketball Invitational where they defeated Eastern Michigan, Mercer, and Vermont to advance to the best-of-three finals series against Loyola–Chicago. They lost to Loyola–Chicago in the finals 2 games to 0.

== Roster ==
Number	Name	Position	Height	Weight	Year	Hometown
0	Marvin Williams	Center	6–8	245	Senior	Memphis, Tennessee
1	Alex Brown	Forward	6–4	185	Freshman	Vernon, Florida
2	DeMondre Harvey	Forward	6–7	210	Junior	Minden, Louisiana
3	Prince Cooper	Guard	6–4	215	Sophomore	Freeport, Bahamas
4	Mack Foster	Guard	6–2	185	Junior	Beulah, Mississippi
5	Jamaal Samuel	Forward	6–9	205	Junior	New Orleans, Louisiana
10	Roderick Taylor	Forward	6–8	210	Freshman	Harker Heights, Texas
11	Nick Coppola	Guard	5–11	190	Sophomore	Richmond, Virginia
12	Tylor Ongwae	Forward	6–7	205	Senior	Eldoret, Kenya
13	Majok Deng	Forward	6–10	190	Junior	Adelaide, Australia
20	Chinedu Amajoyi	Guard	6–3	195	Senior	Rancho Cucamonga, California
22	Lance Richard	Guard	5–10	175	Freshman	Monroe, Louisiana
32	Justin Roberson	Guard	6–1	185	Junior	Natchitoches, Louisiana

== Schedule ==
Date time, TV	Opponent	Result	Record	Site (attendance) city, state
Regular season
11/15/2014*; 7:00 pm	at UAB; Battle 4 Atlantis	W 74–65	1–0	Bartow Arena (2,403); Birmingham, Alabama
11/17/2014*; 7:00 pm	Champion Baptist	W 106–39	2–0	Fant–Ewing Coliseum (1,078); Monroe, Louisiana
11/21/2014*; 7:00 pm, SECN	at No. 8 Florida; Battle 4 Atlantis	L 56–61 ^{OT}	2–1	O'Connell Center (11,003); Gainesville, Florida
11/26/2014*; 1:30 pm	vs. Coastal Carolina; Battle 4 Atlantis	L 48-61	2-2	McKenzie Arena (2,426); Chattanooga, Tennessee
11/27/2014*; 11:00 am	vs. Robert Morris; Battle 4 Atlantis	L 54–71	2–3	McKenzie Arena (2,136); Chattanooga, Tennessee
12/06/2014*; 7:00 pm	Louisiana College	W 83–55	3–3	Fant–Ewing Coliseum (1,053); Monroe, Louisiana
12/09/2014*; 7:00 pm	Northwestern State	W 82–74	4–3	Fant–Ewing Coliseum (1,082); Monroe, Louisiana
12/13/2014*; 7:00 pm	at New Mexico	L 46–54	4–4	The Pit (13,710); Albuquerque, New Mexico
12/16/2014*; 7:00 pm	Central Baptist	W 78–53	5–4	Fant–Ewing Coliseum (1,060); Monroe, Louisiana
12/19/2014*; 7:00 pm	LSU–Alexandria	W 76–71	6–4	Fant–Ewing Coliseum (1,201); Monroe, Louisiana
12/21/2014*; 2:00 pm	at Samford	L 50–64	6–5	Pete Hanna Center (1,053); Homewood, Alabama
12/30/2014; 6:00 pm	at Georgia State	L 45–65	6–6 (0–1)	GSU Sports Arena (1,371); Atlanta, Georgia
01/05/2015; 7:00 pm	Arkansas State	W 70–61	7–6 (1–1)	Fant–Ewing Coliseum (1,418); Monroe, Louisiana
01/08/2015; 7:15 pm	at UT Arlington	W 76–73 ^{OT}	8–6 (2–1)	College Park Center (1,074); Arlington, Texas
01/10/2015; 4:30 pm	at Texas State	W 62–59	9–6 (3–1)	Strahan Coliseum (1,612); San Marcos, Texas
01/15/2015; 7:00 pm	Troy	W 63–54	10–6 (4–1)	Fant–Ewing Coliseum (1,676); Monroe, Louisiana
01/17/2015; 4:00 pm	Arkansas–Little Rock	W 64–52	11–6 (5–1)	Fant–Ewing Coliseum (1,793); Monroe, Louisiana
01/19/2015; 7:15 pm	at Louisiana–Lafayette	W 57–55	12–6 (6–1)	Cajundome (4,213); Lafayette, Louisiana
01/22/2015; 7:00 pm	UT Arlington	L 57–61	12–7 (6–2)	Fant–Ewing Coliseum (1,571); Monroe, Louisiana
01/24/2015; 4:00 pm	Georgia Southern	L 53–57	12–8 (6–3)	Fant–Ewing Coliseum (2,898); Monroe, Louisiana
01/29/2015; 7:30 pm, ESPN3	at Troy	W 58–55 ^{OT}	13–8 (7–3)	Trojan Arena (2,289); Troy, Alabama
01/31/2015; 4:00 pm	South Alabama	W 67–61	14–8 (8–3)	Fant–Ewing Coliseum (1,878); Monroe, Louisiana
02/05/2015; 7:30 pm	at Arkansas–Little Rock	W 77–61	15–8 (9–3)	Jack Stephens Center (1,676); Little Rock, Arkansas
02/07/2015; 6:30 pm	at Georgia Southern	W 71–68 ^{OT}	16–8 (10–3)	Hanner Fieldhouse (2,427); Statesboro, Georgia
02/12/2015; 7:00 pm	Louisiana–Lafayette	W 67–55	17–8 (11–3)	Fant–Ewing Coliseum (3,502); Monroe, Louisiana
02/14/2015; 4:00 pm	Appalachian State	W 69–58	18–8 (12–3)	Fant–Ewing Coliseum (1,388); Monroe, Louisiana
02/21/2015; 7:00 pm	at Arkansas State	L 68–70	18–9 (12–4)	Convocation Center (1,916); Jonesboro, Arkansas
02/26/2015; 7:00 pm	at South Alabama	W 75–57	19–9 (13–4)	Mitchell Center (1,834); Mobile, Alabama
02/28/2015; 2:30 pm	at Appalachian State	L 43–66	19–10 (13–5)	Holmes Center (1,941); Boone, North Carolina
03/05/2015; 7:00 pm	Georgia State	L 50–58	19–11 (13–6)	Fant–Ewing Coliseum (2,871); Monroe, Louisiana
03/07/2015; 4:00 pm	Texas State	W 56–53	20–11 (14–6)	Fant–Ewing Coliseum (1,849); Monroe, Louisiana
Sun Belt tournament
03/13/2015; 7:30 pm, ESPN3	vs. South Alabama; Quarterfinals	W 77–59	21–11	Lakefront Arena (N/A); New Orleans, Louisiana
03/14/2015; 3:30 pm, ESPN3	vs. Georgia Southern; Semifinals	L 43–44	21–12	Lakefront Arena (N/A); New Orleans, Louisiana
College Basketball Invitational
03/18/2015*; 7:00 pm	Eastern Michigan; First round	W 71–67	22–12	Fant–Ewing Coliseum (3,003); Monroe, Louisiana
03/23/2015*; 6:00 pm, ESPN3	at Mercer; Quarterfinals	W 71–69	23–12	Hawkins Arena (2,677); Macon, Georgia
03/25/2015*; 7:00 pm	Vermont; Semifinals	W 71–65	24–12	Fant–Ewing Coliseum (3,368); Monroe, Louisiana
03/30/2015*; 7:00 pm, CBSSN	at Loyola–Chicago; Finals–Game 1	L 58–65	24–13	Joseph Gentile Arena (2,215); Chicago, Illinois
04/01/2015*; 7:00 pm, CBSSN	Loyola–Chicago; Finals–Game 2	L 62–63	24–14	Fant–Ewing Coliseum (4,460); Monroe, Louisiana
*Non-conference game. ^{#}Rankings from AP Poll. (#) Tournament seedings in parentheses. All times are in Central Time.
