= 2014–15 Georgia Southern Eagles men's basketball team =

American college basketball season

2014–15 Georgia Southern Eagles men's basketball
- Conference: Sun Belt Conference
- Record: 22–9 (14–6 Sun Belt)
- Head coach: Mark Byington (2nd season)
- Assistant coaches: Larry Dixon; Andrew Wilson; Tim Kaine
- Home arena: Hanner Fieldhouse

2014–15 Sun Belt Conference men's basketball standings
	Conf.				Overall
Team	W		L	PCT	W		L	PCT
Georgia State †	15	–	5	.750	25	–	10	.714
Georgia Southern	14	–	6	.700	22	–	9	.710
Louisiana–Monroe	14	–	6	.700	24	–	14	.632
Louisiana–Lafayette	13	–	7	.650	22	–	14	.611
Texas–Arlington	10	–	10	.500	16	–	15	.516
Appalachian State*	9	–	11	.450	12	–	17	.414
South Alabama	9	–	11	.450	12	–	21	.364
Arkansas–Little Rock	8	–	12	.400	13	–	18	.419
Texas State	7	–	13	.350	14	–	17	.452
Arkansas State	6	–	14	.300	11	–	18	.379
Troy	5	–	15	.250	10	–	19	.345
† 2015 Sun Belt Conference tournament winner *ineligible for postseason play due to APR penalties

The 2014–15 Georgia Southern Eagles men's basketball team represented Georgia Southern University during the 2014–15 NCAA Division I men's basketball season. The Eagles, led by second year head coach Mark Byington, played their home games at Hanner Fieldhouse and were first year members of the Sun Belt Conference. They finished the season 22–9, 14–6 in Sun Belt play to finish in a tie for second place. They advanced to the championship game of the Sun Belt tournament where they lost to Georgia State. Despite having 22 wins, they did not participate in a postseason tournament.

== Roster ==
Number	Name	Position	Height	Weight	Year	Hometown
0	Amonte Potter	Guard	6–0	175	Sophomore	Marietta, Georgia
1	Devonte Boykins	Guard	6–2	180	Freshman	Forest City, North Carolina
2	Mike Hughes	Guard	6–3	190	Freshman	Winston-Salem, North Carolina
3	Eric Ferguson	Forward	6–8	200	Senior	Statesboro, Georgia
4	Curtis Diamond	Guard	6–3	170	Senior	Lithonia, Georgia
5	Jelani Hewitt	Guard	6–2	185	Senior	Miramar, Florida
10	Jake Allsmiller	Guard	6–5	185	Freshman	Nashville, Tennessee
11	Shawn O'Connell	Forward	6–8	190	Freshman	Roswell, Georgia
12	Aubrey McRae	Guard	6–3	185	Freshman	Augusta, Georgia
13	Angel Matias	Forward	6–4	225	Senior	San Juan, Puerto Rico
14	Coye Simmons	Forward	6–8	235	Freshman	Winston-Salem, North Carolina
23	Jonathan Sanks	Guard	6–4	180	Freshman	Warner Robins, Georgia
30	Scott Kelly	Forward	6–5	210	Sophomore	Milton, Georgia
31	D.J. Suter	Guard	6–4	200	Senior	Alpharetta, Georgia
32	Zach Altany	Guard	6–4	190	Senior	Statesboro, Georgia
33	Grayson Clark	Guard	6–2	185	Sophomore	Milton, Georgia
35	Kyle Doyle	Forward	6–6	210	Sophomore	Hephzibah, Georgia
44	Trent Wiedeman	Forward	6–8	255	Senior	Suwanee, Georgia

== Schedule ==
Date time, TV	Opponent	Result	Record	Site (attendance) city, state
Exhibition
11/07/2014*; 7:00 pm	North Greenville	W 78–56		Hanner Fieldhouse (1,235); Statesboro, GA
Regular season
11/14/2014*; 8:00 pm, ESPN3	at Illinois	L 71–80	0–1	State Farm Center (15,626); Champaign, IL
11/18/2014*; 7:30 pm	Trinity College (FL)	W 86–49	1–1	Hanner Fieldhouse (1,079); Statesboro, GA
11/22/2014*; 6:00 pm	Johnson University (FL)	W 97—41	2–1	Hanner Fieldhouse (705); Statesboro, GA
11/24/2014*; 7:00 pm	FIU	W 78–72	3–1	Hanner Fieldhouse (728); Statesboro, GA
11/29/2014*; 2:30 pm	South Carolina State	W 71–58	4–1	Hanner Fieldhouse (802); Statesboro, GA
12/02/2014*; 7:30 pm, ESPN3	at UCF	L 59–61	4–2	CFE Arena (3,544); Orlando, FL
12/15/2014*; 7:00 pm, ESPN3	at South Florida	W 68–63	5–2	USF Sun Dome (2,912); Tampa, FL
12/18/2014*; 7:00 pm	at Stetson	L 67–76	6–2	Edmunds Center (1,233); DeLand, FL
12/22/2014*; 6:00 pm	Truett-McConnell	W 90–57	7–2	Hanner Fieldhouse (805); Statesboro, GA
12/30/2014; 8:15 pm	at UT Arlington	L 61–62	7–3 (0–1)	College Park Center (1,400); Arlington, TX
01/03/2015; 7:00 pm	Texas State	W 40–36	8–3 (1–1)	Hanner Fieldhouse (1,133); Statesboro, GA
01/08/2015; 8:30 pm	at Arkansas State	W 73–61	9–3 (2–1)	Convocation Center (1,645); Jonesboro, AR
01/10/2015; 5:00 pm	at South Alabama	W 81–73	10–3 (3–1)	Mitchell Center (1,872); Mobile, AL
01/15/2015; 7:30 pm	Louisiana–Lafayette	W 78–70	11–3 (4–1)	Hanner Fieldhouse (4,325); Statesboro, GA
01/17/2015; 5:15 pm	at Troy	L 71–75	11–4 (4–2)	Trojan Arena (1,968); Troy, AL
01/22/2015; 8:30 pm	at Texas State	W 45–43	12–4 (5–2)	Strahan Coliseum (3,275); San Marcos, TX
01/24/2015; 5:00 pm	at Louisiana–Monroe	W 57–53	13–4 (6–2)	Fant–Ewing Coliseum (2,898); Monroe, LA
01/29/2015; 7:30 pm	Appalachian State	W 83–46	14–4 (7–2)	Hanner Fieldhouse (3,217); Statesboro, GA
01/31/2015; 7:30 pm	Arkansas–Little Rock	W 76–61	15–4 (8–2)	Hanner Fieldhouse (N/A); Statesboro, GA
02/05/2015; 7:30 pm	Georgia State	W 58–54	16–4 (9–2)	Hanner Fieldhouse (4,325); Statesboro, GA
02/07/2015; 7:30 pm	Louisiana–Monroe	L 68–71 ^{OT}	16–5 (9–3)	Hanner Fieldhouse (2,427); Statesboro, GA
02/12/2015; 7:30 pm	Arkansas State	W 65–60	17–5 (10–3)	Hanner Fieldhouse (1,768); Statesboro, GA
02/14/2015; 6:00 pm	at Arkansas–Little Rock	W 72–70 ^{OT}	18–5 (11–3)	Jack Stephens Center (1,323); Little Rock, AR
02/19/2015; 7:30 pm	Troy	L 62–65	18–6 (11–4)	Hanner Fieldhouse (1,447); Statesboro, GA
02/21/2015; 7:30 pm, ESPN3	South Alabama	W 80–74	19–6 (12–4)	Hanner Fieldhouse (2,128); Statesboro, GA
02/26/2015; 7:30 pm	at Appalachian State	W 77–58	20–6 (13–4)	Holmes Center (1,684); Boone, NC
02/28/2015; 8:15 pm	at Louisiana–Lafayette	L 58–68	20–7 (13–5)	Cajundome (3,937); Lafayette, LA
03/05/2015; 7:30 pm	UT Arlington	W 76–64	21–7 (14–5)	Hanner Fieldhouse (1,176); Statesboro, GA
03/07/2015; 2:00 pm	at Georgia State	L 55–72	21–8 (14–6)	GSU Sports Arena (3,854); Atlanta, GA
Sun Belt tournament
03/14/2015; 4:30 pm, ESPN3	vs. Louisiana–Monroe; Semifinals	W 44–43	22–8	Lakefront Arena (N/A); New Orleans, LA
03/15/2015; 1:00 pm, ESPN2	vs. Georgia State; Championship game	L 36–38	22–9	Lakefront Arena (N/A); New Orleans, LA
*Non-conference game. ^{#}Rankings from AP Poll. (#) Tournament seedings in parentheses. All times are in Eastern Time.
