= 2014–15 Troy Trojans men's basketball team =

American college basketball season

2014–15 Troy Trojans men's basketball
- Conference: Sun Belt Conference
- Record: 10–19 (5–15 Sun Belt)
- Head coach: Phil Cunningham (2nd season)
- Assistant coaches: Marcus Grant; Ben Fletcher; Billy Begley
- Home arena: Trojan Arena (Capacity 5,200) Dothan Civic Center (Capacity 3,100)

2014–15 Sun Belt Conference men's basketball standings
	Conf.				Overall
Team	W		L	PCT	W		L	PCT
Georgia State †	15	–	5	.750	25	–	10	.714
Georgia Southern	14	–	6	.700	22	–	9	.710
Louisiana–Monroe	14	–	6	.700	24	–	14	.632
Louisiana–Lafayette	13	–	7	.650	22	–	14	.611
Texas–Arlington	10	–	10	.500	16	–	15	.516
Appalachian State*	9	–	11	.450	12	–	17	.414
South Alabama	9	–	11	.450	12	–	21	.364
Arkansas–Little Rock	8	–	12	.400	13	–	18	.419
Texas State	7	–	13	.350	14	–	17	.452
Arkansas State	6	–	14	.300	11	–	18	.379
Troy	5	–	15	.250	10	–	19	.345
† 2015 Sun Belt Conference tournament winner *ineligible for postseason play due to APR penalties

The 2014–15 Troy Trojans men's basketball team represented Troy University during the 2014–15 NCAA Division I men's basketball season. The Trojans, led by second year head coach Phil Cunningham, played their home games at Trojan Arena and were members of the Sun Belt Conference. They finished the season 10–19, 5–15 in Sun Belt play to finish in last place. They failed to qualify for the Sun Belt tournament.

== Roster ==
Number	Name	Position	Height	Weight	Year	Hometown
1	Musa Abdul-Aleem	Guard	6–5	220	Senior	Atlanta, Georgia
2	Jeremy Hollimon	Guard	6–2	175	Junior	Gulfport, Mississippi
3	Wesley Person, Jr.	Guard	6–3	180	Freshman	Brantley, Alabama
4	Kelton Ford	Guard	6–0	180	Sophomore	Horse Cave, Kentucky
5	Christian Harrison	Guard/Forward	6–5	180	Freshman	Atlanta, Georgia
10	Chris Bilbo	Guard	6–2	175	Junior	Jackson, Mississippi
11	Jordan Anderson	Guard	6–3	185	Freshman	Dothan, Alabama
12	Colin Edwards	Forward	6–5	190	Freshman	Rainbow City, Alabama
14	Jaro Moravek	Forward/Center	6–8	240	Sophomore	Handlová, Slovakia
15	Oskar Reinfelds	Guard	6–4	195	Junior	Riga, Latvia
21	John Walton	Forward	6–7	220	Junior	Memphis, Tennessee
25	Kevin Thomas	Forward	6–8	215	Senior	Ajax, Ontario
32	Damion Ottman	Forward	6–8	205	Freshman	Macon, Georgia
33	Aaron Ariri	Forward/Center	6–8	225	Freshman	Brampton, Ontario

== Schedule ==
Date time, TV	Opponent	Result	Record	Site (attendance) city, state
Exhibition
11/06/2014*; 7:30 pm	West Florida	W 72–63		Trojan Arena; Troy, AL
Regular season
11/14/2014*; 7:00 pm	Brewton–Parker	W 85–71	1–0	Trojan Arena (1,786); Troy, AL
11/17/2014*; 7:00 pm	Ole Miss	L 64–74	1–1	Trojan Arena (3,278); Troy, AL
11/21/2014*; 6:00 pm	at Georgia	L 60–82	1–2	Stegeman Coliseum (5,127); Athens, GA
11/25/2014*; 7:00 pm	at Southern Miss	L 70–72	1–3	Reed Green Coliseum (3,202); Hattiesburg, MS
12/02/2014*; 7:00 pm	Alcorn State	W 72–51	2–3	Trojan Arena (1,136); Troy, AL
12/06/2014*; 12:00 pm	Central Arkansas	W 85–73	3–3	Trojan Arena (1,089); Troy, AL
12/11/2014*; 7:00 pm	vs. Fort Valley State	W 80–63	4–3	Dothan Civic Center (1,153); Dothan, AL
12/15/2014*; 7:00 pm	at Austin Peay	L 70–73	4–4	Dunn Center (1,886); Clarksville, TN
12/21/2014*; 3:30 pm	at Nicholls State	W 65–64	5–4	Stopher Gym (649); Thibodaux, LA
12/30/2014; 7:30 pm	Texas State	L 46–57	5–5 (0–1)	Trojan Arena (1,578); Troy, AL
01/03/2015; 7:15 pm	at Louisiana–Lafayette	L 64–91	5–6 (0–2)	Cajundome (3,973); Lafayette, LA
01/05/2015; 7:30 pm	UT Arlington	W 71–66	6–6 (1–2)	Trojan Arena (1,611); Troy, AL
01/10/2015; 1:00 pm	at Georgia State	L 72–77	6–7 (1–3)	GSU Sports Arena (1,345); Atlanta, GA
01/15/2015; 7:00 pm	at Louisiana–Monroe	L 54–63	6–8 (1–4)	Fant–Ewing Coliseum (1,676); Monroe, LA
01/17/2015; 4:15 pm	Georgia Southern	W 75–71	7–8 (2–4)	Trojan Arena (1,968); Troy, AL
01/19/2015; 7:30 pm	Appalachian State	L 64–69	7–9 (2–5)	Trojan Arena (1,763); Troy, AL
01/22/2015; 7:30 pm	at Arkansas–Little Rock	L 65–73	7–10 (2–6)	Jack Stephens Center (1,281); Little Rock, AR
01/24/2015; 4:15 pm	Arkansas State	L 55–64	7–11 (2–7)	Trojan Arena (1,711); Troy, AL
01/29/2015; 7:30 pm, ESPN3	Louisiana–Monroe	L 55–58 ^{OT}	7–12 (2–8)	Trojan Arena (2,289); Troy, AL
01/31/2015; 7:15 pm	at UT Arlington	W 55–54	8–12 (3–8)	College Park Center (2,562); Arlington, TX
02/05/2015; 7:30 pm	at Arkansas State	W 69–64	9–12 (4–8)	Convocation Center (1,919); Jonesboro, AR
02/07/2015; 2:30 pm	at Appalachian State	L 62–65	9–13 (4–9)	Holmes Center (2,337); Boone, NC
02/12/2015; 7:30 pm	South Alabama	L 67–71	9–14 (4–10)	Trojan Arena (2,753); Troy, AL
02/14/2015; 4:15 pm	Louisiana–Lafayette	L 80–84 ^{OT}	9–15 (4–11)	Trojan Arena (1,327); Troy, AL
02/19/2015; 6:30 pm	at Georgia Southern	W 65–62	10–15 (5–11)	Hanner Fieldhouse (1,447); Statesboro, GA
02/21/2015; 4:15 pm	Arkansas–Little Rock	L 58–63	10–16 (5–12)	Trojan Arena (1,762); Troy, AL
02/26/2015; 7:30 pm	at Texas State	L 61–67	10–17 (5–13)	Strahan Coliseum (2,278); San Marcos, TX
02/28/2015; 4:15 pm	Georgia State	L 64–75	10–18 (5–14)	Trojan Arena (3,937); Troy, AL
03/07/2015; 4:00 pm	at South Alabama	L 93–96	10–19 (5–15)	Mitchell Center (N/A); Mobile, AL
*Non-conference game. ^{#}Rankings from AP Poll. (#) Tournament seedings in parentheses. All times are in Central Time.
