= 2014–15 Georgia State Panthers men's basketball team =

American college basketball season

2014–15 Georgia State Panthers men's basketball
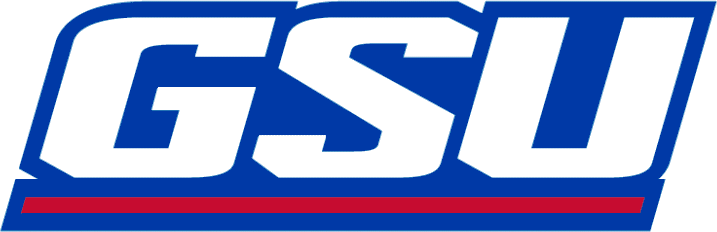

Sun Belt regular season and tournament champions

NCAA tournament, round of 32
- Conference: Sun Belt Conference
- Record: 25–10 (15–5 Sun Belt)
- Head coach: Ron Hunter (4th season)
- Assistant coaches: Darryl LaBarrie (4th season); Everick Sullivan (4th season); Claude Pardue (4th season)
- Home arena: GSU Sports Arena

2014–15 Sun Belt Conference men's basketball standings
	Conf.				Overall
Team	W		L	PCT	W		L	PCT
Georgia State †	15	–	5	.750	25	–	10	.714
Georgia Southern	14	–	6	.700	22	–	9	.710
Louisiana–Monroe	14	–	6	.700	24	–	14	.632
Louisiana–Lafayette	13	–	7	.650	22	–	14	.611
Texas–Arlington	10	–	10	.500	16	–	15	.516
Appalachian State*	9	–	11	.450	12	–	17	.414
South Alabama	9	–	11	.450	12	–	21	.364
Arkansas–Little Rock	8	–	12	.400	13	–	18	.419
Texas State	7	–	13	.350	14	–	17	.452
Arkansas State	6	–	14	.300	11	–	18	.379
Troy	5	–	15	.250	10	–	19	.345
† 2015 Sun Belt Conference tournament winner *ineligible for postseason play due to APR penalties

The 2014–15 Georgia State Panthers men's basketball team represented Georgia State University during 2014–15 NCAA Division I men's basketball season. The team's head coach was Ron Hunter serving his fourth season at GSU. The Panthers played their home games at the GSU Sports Arena competing as members of the Sun Belt Conference. They finished the season 25–10, 15–5 in Sun Belt play to win the Sun Belt regular season championship. They defeated Louisiana–Lafayette and Georgia Southern to become champions of the Sun Belt tournament. They received an automatic bid to the NCAA tournament where they defeated Baylor in the second round before losing in the third round to Xavier.

== Preseason notes ==
- Despite playing at Louisville during the 2013–14 season, shooting guard Kevin Ware was granted an NCAA waiver to play immediately at Georgia State due to hardship resulting from an internationally witnessed compound fracture in his leg during a 2013 NCAA tournament Elite Eight game against Duke. Though returning the following season after partial recovery, Ware only saw limited minutes early in the season, and suffered a major setback in a mid-December game against Missouri State, when he was kicked in the same right leg that had been fractured. He did not play for the rest of the season, making him eligible for an NCAA hardship waiver, popularly known as a "medical redshirt". He withdrew from the team entirely after the end of the season, choosing to transfer out, and chose Georgia State because the school was close to his family's current Atlanta-area home.

=== Preseason rankings and accolades ===
- Georgia State was voted unanimously in the preseason conference coaches poll to win, picking up all 11 votes.
- Junior R. J. Hunter was voted preseason basketball player of the year as well as the conference player of the year.
- R. J. Hunter and Ryan Harrow were both selected for the preseason all conference first team. Curtis Washington was selected for the preseason all conference third team.

== Season notes ==
- During the regular season opener on the 15th of November, the Panthers beat the regular season record for margin of victory against Tennessee Temple, beating them by 60 points. The previous record was set in 1986 against Piedmont.
- During the regular season opener on the 15th of November, the Panthers set a school record for assists at 27.
- During the conference game against Arkansas State, RJ Hunter tied the school record for total points made during his career at 1,515, tying him with Rodney Hamilton. His record currently stands at 1,620.
- During the January 31st game against Arkansas State, Ryan Harrow scored his 1,000th career point, being the second-fastest Panther in school history to make the mark.
- During the February 14th win against Texas State, R. J. Hunter set a new record for 3-point attempts in a career at 642.

=== Regular season championship title ===
Toward the end of the regular season, three teams would find themselves tied for first place. ULM, Georgia Southern and Georgia State were all in a position to win the championship, which brought with it a number 1 seed in the Sun Belt Tournament, as well as an automatic bid to the NIT if that team did not win the conference tournament. Heading into the first matchup against first place instate rivals Georgia Southern, the Panthers found themselves half a game behind, with a win over the Eagles set to push them ahead in the rankings to first place. While the Panthers held the lead for most of the game, including a 6-point lead at the half, the Eagles surged at the end in front of a sellout crowd of 4,325 to win the game, 58–54.

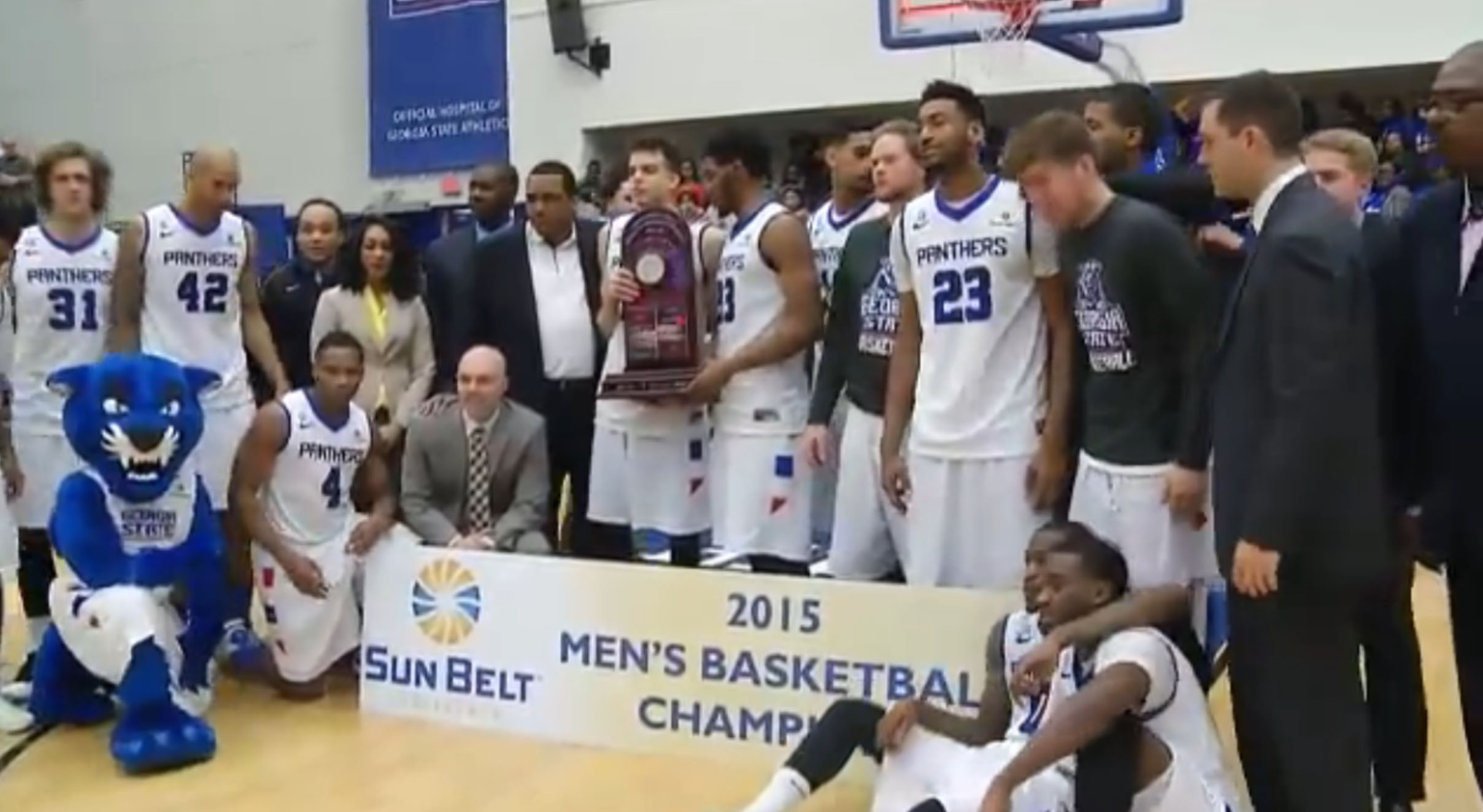
Georgia State celebrating winning the regular season Sun Belt basketball title in spring 2015

The loss set the Panthers back behind both ULM and Georgia Southern. The following Saturday, ULM would beat the Eagles in Statesboro, giving the Warhawks first place in conference, followed by the Eagles and finally the Panthers in third. Following that point, both teams would lose two more games with the Panthers only losing one, creating a three-way tie going into the final week of Sun Belt play. A scheduling quirk would have Georgia State play at ULM on the final Thursday of regular season play, followed by Georgia Southern at home on the final Saturday. Prior to the Thursday game against ULM, it was announced that the Sports Arena, the home court of the Panthers, was sold out for the game against Georgia Southern. The Panthers would go on to beat ULM as the Eagles beat UT-Arlington, pushing the Warhawks out of first place with no chance to recover, and making the final regular-season game at the Sports Arena the determining game for the winner of the Sun Belt regular season title.

The GSU women's basketball game would precede the men's game, with fans pouring in before that game had begun. During the first half of the game, leading Sun Belt scorer Ryan Harrow fell with an injury to his knee, being helped off the court and unable to put pressure on his leg. He would check back into the game with 4:40 remaining in the first half only to be taken back out after 2 1/2 minutes for the rest of the game. Without Harrow, the Panthers finished the first half with an 11-point lead. However, after returning for the second half, the Eagles would cut that lead to four with a score of 38–34 after back-to-back three-pointers were scored along with a two-point jumper. R. J. Hunter went on to pull the lead back by scoring 10 consecutive points, after which the Eagles did not threaten again. Sun Belt commissioner, Karl Benson, was on hand to present the Sun Belt trophy to the team after the win, which gave the Panthers back-to-back Sun Belt Basketball regular season titles.

=== Regular season awards and accolades ===
- Ryan Harrow was named the Atlanta Tipoff Club's Georgia Men's College Player of the Year
- R. J. Hunter was awarded the Sun Belt Player of the Week award three times over the course of the regular season
- R. J. Hunter was awarded Sun Belt Conference Player of the Year award for the second year in a row, being the fourth player in Sun Belt Conference history to achieve the feat

=== Postseason ===
==== Post Season Awards and Accolades ====
- Both R. J. Hunter and Ryan Harrow were given all conference first team honors.
- Kevin Ware was named the Sun Belt Tournament MVP.
- R. J. Hunter was named Sun Belt Male Student-Athlete of the Year by the Sun Belt Conference for the second year in a row.
- Ryann Green was included in the Sun Belt Conference's leadership team.

==== Sun Belt Tournament ====
Due to the Sun Belt Conferences tournament format, only the top eight basketball teams were eligible to compete, with the top two seeds receiving double byes straight into the tournaments semifinals. After competing for the conference regular season title in the final regular-season game, Georgia State and Georgia Southern received those top seeds, respectively. The Panthers faced Louisiana-Lafayette in their first game, the same team that had eliminated them from the title game of the previous season's Sun Belt tournament. The Panthers would end up beating the Ragin' Cajuns 83–79 after allowing them to come back in the final minutes.

Georgia Southern would beat ULM in their first game, setting the Panthers and the Eagles for a rematch of the unofficial regular season title game. The game would be one of the lowest scoring tournament games since such statistics have been tracked, ending in the Panthers favor with a final score of 38–36. After the final buzzer rang, the Panthers' head coach Ron Hunter rushed off the sidelines to embrace his son R. J. Hunter and began hopping as they met, both falling on the floor. It would be reported later that he had torn his Achilles tendon during the celebration. This, along with the dominating performance of Kevin Ware in the title game, would surround the Panthers in the media during the run up to the NCAA tournament, where the 14 seed would face third seed Baylor.

==== NCAA tournament ====
The Panthers would face Baylor in Jacksonville, Florida, at Jacksonville Veterans Memorial Arena. While the game was kept close throughout the first half, Baylor managed to take a three-point lead at half time by throwing up a buzzer-beating three-pointer that bobbled its way into the basket. After pulling away from the Panthers in the second half, Baylor would watch Georgia State claw its way back into the game in the final two minutes, erasing a 12-point deficit and making it a two-point game with under a minute left. After sending Baylor to the free throw line with less than 20 seconds remaining, the Panthers got the ball to R. J. Hunter, who drained a deep three-point shot with 2.8 seconds remaining to take a 1-point lead. While watching the ball go into the net, coach Ron Hunter, sitting on a stool due to his injured Achilles tendon, fell off the stool onto the court. The Panthers would pull off the upset, beating Baylor 57–56 and continuing into the third round of the tournament. The events on the court would make the team "the darlings of the NCAA tournament", shooting the Panthers, and especially R. J. and Ron Hunter into fame. Numerous memes and videos would be made in reference to Coach Hunter's fall, while the father-son story would result in news specials and national exposure to the team.

The Panthers faced Xavier in the third round of the tournament, where their season ended with a 67–75 loss.

== Aftermath ==
After the season ended, attention to the Hunter family and the Georgia State program grew almost immediately as the TV channel covering the game switched its feed over to the post game press conference, airing video of a crying Ron Hunter explaining how proud of his team and his son he was. As the week continued, it would turn out that Georgia State would be the fourth most mentioned team on Twitter after Iowa State, Kentucky, and UAB respectively. At the same time, the second and fourth most talked about moments of the tournament were Georgia State beating Baylor and R.J. Hunter hitting the game winning three-pointer, respectively, while R. J. Hunter was the most talked about player in the tournament. Stories were run in local and national media, having interviews with Ron and R. J., as well as articles on the trainer that helped Ron up after his fall from the stool after he fell, and the reaction to R. J.'s game winning shot of the Georgia State men's golf team.

After arriving back in Atlanta, it was reported that Hunter would meet with the Athletic Department of Georgia State to plan for ways to keep Georgia State at a high level in basketball, and also to negotiate Hunter's contract. It was later reported that Hunter had negotiated raises for his assistant coaches, and put pressure on the administration to begin the process of building a practice facility for the basketball team and improving the Sports Arena for the coming season. It was later reported that Ron and R. J. would join the Turner Sports broadcast team as guest analysts in their Atlanta studio during the following weeks games.

== Roster ==
2014–15 Georgia State Panthers men's basketball team
Players
Coaches

Pos.	#	Name	Height	Weight	Year	Hometown
G	0	Kevin Ware	6 ft 2 in (1.88 m)	170 lb (77 kg)	RS Jr	Rockdale County, GA
G	1	Jeremy Hollowell (redshirt)	6 ft 8 in (2.03 m)	210 lb (95 kg)	So	Marietta, GA
G	2	Ryann Green	6 ft 1 in (1.85 m)	180 lb (82 kg)	Sr	College Park, GA
G	4	Isaiah Dennis	6 ft 0 in (1.83 m)	185 lb (84 kg)	RS So	McDonough, GA
G	11	Isaiah Williams (redshirt)	6 ft 1 in (1.85 m)	160 lb (73 kg)	So	Buford, GA
F	15	Jalen Brown	6 ft 8 in (2.03 m)	230 lb (104 kg)	Jr	South Holland, IL
G	20	Corey Tobin	6 ft 4 in (1.93 m)	185 lb (84 kg)	Fr	Cartersville, GA
G	22	R. J. Hunter	6 ft 6 in (1.98 m)	190 lb (86 kg)	Jr	Indianapolis, IN
F	23	Jordan Sessions	6 ft 7 in (2.01 m)	205 lb (93 kg)	Fr	McDonough, GA
G	25	David Travers	6 ft 0 in (1.83 m)	170 lb (77 kg)	RS So	Carlsbad, CA
G	30	Jeff Thomas	6 ft 5 in (1.96 m)	195 lb (88 kg)	Fr	Norwalk, OH
F	31	TJ Shipes	6 ft 7 in (2.01 m)	225 lb (102 kg)	Jr	Buford, GA
F	33	Marcus Crider	6 ft 6 in (1.98 m)	200 lb (91 kg)	Jr	Dayton, OH
G	34	Carter Cagle	6 ft 3 in (1.91 m)	205 lb (93 kg)	Fr	Gainesville, GA
F	42	Curtis Washington	6 ft 10 in (2.08 m)	230 lb (104 kg)	RS Sr	Elizabethtown, KY
G	55	Ryan Harrow	6 ft 2 in (1.88 m)	160 lb (73 kg)	RS Sr	Marietta, GA

Head coach

- Ron Hunter (Miami (OH))

Assistant coach(es)

- Darryl LaBarrie (Georgia Tech)
- Everick Sullivan (Louisville)
- Claude Pardue (Emory)

Legend

- (C) Team captain
- (S) Suspended
- (I) Ineligible
- (W) Walk-on
- Injured
- Current redshirt

== Schedule ==
Date time, TV	Rank^{#}	Opponent^{#}	Result	Record	Site (attendance) city, state
Exhibition
November 3*; 7:00 pm, GSTN		Georgia College	W 83–61		GSU Sports Arena (N/A); Atlanta, GA
November 10*; 7:00 pm, GSTN		Shorter	W 89–58		GSU Sports Arena (N/A); Atlanta, GA
Regular season
November 14*; 7:00 pm		Tennessee Temple	W 115–55	1–0	GSU Sports Arena (1,862); Atlanta, GA
November 17*; 9:00 pm, ESPNU		at No. 14 Iowa State; CBE Hall of Fame Classic	L 58–81	1–1	Hilton Coliseum (13,913); Ames, IA
November 21*; 9:00 pm, MWN		at Colorado State	L 70–80	1–2	Moby Arena (3,056); Fort Collins, CO
November 24*; 4:30 pm		vs. Chicago State; CBE Hall of Fame Classic	W 69–46	2–2	Athletics Center O'rena (125); Rochester, MI
November 25*; 4:30 pm		vs. Western Carolina; CBE Hall of Fame Classic	W 85–70	3–2	Athletics Center O'rena (185); Rochester, MI
November 26*; 7:00 pm, ESPN3		at Oakland; CBE Hall of Fame Classic	W 83–78	4–2	Athletics Center O'rena (1,527); Rochester, MI
November 29*; 1:00 pm, ESPN3		at IUPUI	W 66–63	5–2	Fairgrounds Coliseum (1,554); Indianapolis, IN
December 4*; 7:00 pm		Green Bay	W 72–48	6–2	GSU Sports Arena (2,181); Atlanta, GA
December 17*; 8:00 pm, ASN		at Old Dominion	L 54–58 ^{OT}	6–3	Ted Constant Convocation Center (5,470); Norfolk, VA
December 21*; 2:00 pm		Southern Miss	W 68–55	7–3	GSU Sports Arena (1,387); Atlanta, GA
December 27*; 1:00 pm, ESPN3		at Green Bay	L 61–78	7–4	Resch Center (4,267); Green Bay, WI
Conference Games
December 30; 7:00 pm		Louisiana–Monroe	W 65–45	8–4 (1–0)	GSU Sports Arena (1,371); Atlanta, GA
January 3; 2:00 pm		UALR	W 82–69	9–4 (2–0)	GSU Sports Arena (1,269); Atlanta, GA
January 5; 7:00 pm		Texas State	L 74–77 ^{2OT}	9–5 (2–1)	GSU Sports Arena (1,146); Atlanta, GA
January 8; 8:15 pm		at Louisiana–Lafayette	L 80–84	9–6 (2–2)	Cajundome (4,531); Lafayette, LA
January 10; 2:00 pm		Troy	W 77–72	10–6 (3–2)	GSU Sports Arena (1,345); Atlanta, GA
January 15; 7:00 pm		UT Arlington	W 83–62	11–6 (4–2)	GSU Sports Arena (2,119); Atlanta, GA
January 17; 3:30 pm		at Appalachian State	L 69–74	11–7 (4–3)	George M. Holmes Convocation Center (2,622); Boone, NC
January 19; 8:30 pm		at Arkansas State	W 60–54	12–7 (5–3)	Convocation Center (2,016); Jonesboro, AR
January 24; 2:00 pm, ESPN3		Louisiana–Lafayette	W 75–64	13–7 (6–3)	GSU Sports Arena (2,353); Atlanta, GA
January 29; 8:15 pm		UT Arlington	W 88–74	14–7 (7–3)	College Park Center (2,262); Arlington, TX
January 31; 2:00 pm		Arkansas State	W 74–43	15–7 (8–3)	GSU Sports Arena (1,564); Atlanta, GA
February 5; 7:30 pm, WSAV-TV		at Georgia Southern	L 54–58	15–8 (8–4)	Hanner Fieldhouse (4,325); Statesboro, GA
February 7; 5:05 pm		at South Alabama	W 65–54	16–8 (9–4)	Mitchell Center (2,535); Mobile, AL
February 14; 12:00 pm, ESPN2		at Texas State	W 53–41	17–8 (10–4)	Strahan Coliseum (N/A); San Marcos, TX
February 19; 7:00 pm		South Alabama	W 79–51	18–8 (11–4)	GSU Sports Arena (1,992); Atlanta, GA
February 21; 2:00 pm		Appalachian State	W 87–43	19–8 (12–4)	GSU Sports Arena (1,860); Atlanta, GA
February 26; 8:30 pm		at UALR	L 83–92	19–9 (12–5)	Jack Stephens Center (1,879); Little Rock, AR
February 28; 5:15 pm		Troy	W 75–64	20–9 (13–5)	Trojan Arena (1,855); Troy, AL
March 5; 8:00 pm		at Louisiana–Monroe	W 58–50	21–9 (14–5)	Fant–Ewing Coliseum (2,871); Monroe, LA
March 7; 2:00 pm		Georgia Southern	W 72–55	22–9 (15–5)	GSU Sports Arena (3,854); Atlanta, GA
Sun Belt tournament
March 14; 2:00 pm, ESPN3	(1)	vs. (4) Louisiana–Lafayette; Semifinals	W 83–79	23–9	Lakefront Arena (N/A); New Orleans, LA
March 15; 1:00 pm, ESPN2	(1)	vs. (2) Georgia Southern; Championship game	W 38–36	24–9	Lakefront Arena (N/A); New Orleans, LA
NCAA tournament
March 19*; 1:40 pm, TBS	(14 W)	vs. (3 W) No. 16 Baylor; Second round	W 57–56	25–9	Jacksonville Veterans Memorial Arena (N/A); Jacksonville, FL
March 21*; 6:10 pm, TNT	(14 W)	vs. (6 W) Xavier; Third round	L 67–75	25–10	Jacksonville Veterans Memorial Arena (13,687); Jacksonville, FL
*Non-conference game. ^{#}Rankings from AP Poll. (#) Tournament seedings in parentheses. W=West Region. All times are in Eastern Time.
