= 2014–15 Baylor Bears basketball team =

American college basketball season

2014–15 Baylor Bears men's basketball

NCAA tournament, Round of 64
- Conference: Big 12 Conference

Ranking
- Coaches: No. 21
- AP: No. 16
- Record: 24–10 (11–7 Big 12)
- Head coach: Scott Drew (12th season)
- Assistant coaches: Jerome Tang; Grant McCasland; Paul Mills
- Home arena: Ferrell Center

2014–15 Big 12 men's basketball standings
	Conf.				Overall
Team	W		L	PCT	W		L	PCT
No. 10 Kansas	13	–	5	.722	27	–	9	.750
No. 9 Iowa State †	12	–	6	.667	25	–	9	.735
No. 13 Oklahoma	12	–	6	.667	24	–	11	.686
No. 16 Baylor	11	–	7	.611	24	–	10	.706
No. 20 West Virginia	11	–	7	.611	25	–	10	.714
Oklahoma State	8	–	10	.444	18	–	14	.563
Texas	8	–	10	.444	20	–	14	.588
Kansas State	8	–	10	.444	15	–	17	.469
TCU	4	–	14	.222	18	–	15	.545
Texas Tech	3	–	15	.167	13	–	19	.406
† 2015 Big 12 Tournament winner Rankings from AP poll

The 2014–15 Baylor Bears basketball team represented Baylor University in the 2014–15 NCAA Division I men's basketball season. This was head coach Scott Drew's twelfth season at Baylor. The Bears competed in the Big 12 Conference and played their home games at the Ferrell Center. They finished the season 24–10, 11–7 in Big 12 play to finish in a tie for fourth place. They advanced to the semifinals of the Big 12 tournament where they lost to Kansas. They received an at-large bid to the NCAA tournament where they were upset in the first round by Georgia State.

== Pre-season ==
=== Departures ===
Name	Number	Pos.	Height	Weight	Year	Hometown	Notes
Gary Franklin	4	PG	6'2"	190	Senior (RS)	Santa Ana, California	Graduated
Brady Heslip	5	SG	6'2"	180	Senior (RS)	Montreal	Graduated; Entered 2014 NBA Development League Draft; Selected 1st Round, Pick #11 by the Reno Bighorns
Isaiah Austin	21	C	7'1"	225	Sophomore	Arlington, Texas	Entered 2014 NBA draft; Withdrew after being diagnosed with Marfan syndrome forcing him to retire from basketball; Returned to school as a Student Assistant Coach
Cory Jefferson	34	PF	6'9"	220	Senior	Killeen, Texas	Graduated; Entered 2014 NBA Draft; Selected 2nd Round, Pick #60 by the San Antonio Spurs

=== Recruits ===
College recruiting information
Name	Hometown	School	Height	Weight	Commit date
Damiyne Durham; SG	Oakword, Texas	Oakwood High School	6 ft 5 in (1.96 m)	190 lb (86 kg)	Aug 24, 2013
Damiyne Durham; SG	Recruit ratings: Scout: Rivals: 247Sports: ESPN:				
T.J. Maston; PF	Desoto, TX	Desoto High School	6 ft 7 in (2.01 m)	215 lb (98 kg)	Sep 8, 2013
T.J. Maston; PF	Recruit ratings: Scout: Rivals: 247Sports: ESPN:				
Deng Deng; PF	Melbourne, Australia	Lee College	6 ft 8 in (2.03 m)	215 lb (98 kg)	May 4, 2014
Deng Deng; PF	Recruit ratings: Scout: Rivals: 247Sports: ESPN:				
Lester Medford; PG	Tucson, AZ	Indian Hills Community College	6 ft 1 in (1.85 m)	170 lb (77 kg)	Nov 20, 2013
Lester Medford; PG	Recruit ratings: Scout: Rivals: 247Sports: ESPN:				
Overall recruit ranking:
Note: In many cases, Scout, Rivals, 247Sports, On3, and ESPN may conflict in their listings of height and weight.; In these cases, the average was taken. ESPN grades are on a 100-point scale.; Sources: "2014 Team Ranking". Rivals.

== Roster ==
2014–15 Baylor Bears men's basketball team
Players
Coaches

Pos.	#	Name	Height	Weight	Year	Previous school	Hometown
F	00	Royce O'Neale	6 ft 6 in (1.98 m)	215 lb (98 kg)	Sr	Harker Heights / Denver	Killeen, TX
G	1	Kenny Chery	5 ft 11 in (1.8 m)	180 lb (82 kg)	Sr	Archbishop Carroll / State Fair CC	Montreal, QE
F	2	Rico Gathers	6 ft 8 in (2.03 m)	280 lb (127 kg)	Jr	Riverside Academy	LaPlace, LA
G	11	Lester Medford	5 ft 10 in (1.78 m)	175 lb (79 kg)	Jr	Amphitheater / Indian Hills CC	Tucson, AZ
F	13	John Heard	6 ft 5 in (1.96 m)	200 lb (91 kg)	Jr	Episcopal	Houston, TX
F	21	Taurean Prince	6 ft 7 in (2.01 m)	215 lb (98 kg)	Jr	Earl Warren	San Antonio, TX
G	23	Damiyne Durham	6 ft 4 in (1.93 m)	175 lb (79 kg)	Fr	Oakwood	Oakwood, TX
G/F	24	Ish Wainright	6 ft 5 in (1.96 m)	250 lb (113 kg)	So	Montrose Christian	Kansas City, MO
F	25	Al Freeman	6 ft 3 in (1.91 m)	200 lb (91 kg)	RS Fr	Findlay Prep	Charlotte, NC
F	31	T. J. Maston	6 ft 7 in (2.01 m)	220 lb (100 kg)	Fr	DeSoto	DeSoto, TX
G	33	Austin Mills	6 ft 1 in (1.85 m)	175 lb (79 kg)	Jr	Beverly Hills / Pepperdine	Beverly Hills, CA
F	35	Johnathan Motley	6 ft 9 in (2.06 m)	230 lb (104 kg)	RS Fr	North Shore	Houston, TX
F	45	Deng Deng	6 ft 8 in (2.03 m)	205 lb (93 kg)	Jr	Granger / Lee College	Melbourne, Australia

Head coach

- Scott Drew (Butler)

Assistant coach(es)

- Jerome Tang (Charter Oak State)
- Grant McCasland (Baylor)
- Paul Mills (Texas A&M)

Legend

- (C) Team captain
- (S) Suspended
- (I) Ineligible
- (W) Walk-on
- Injured
- Current redshirt

== Schedule and results ==
Date time, TV	Rank^{#}	Opponent^{#}	Result	Record	Site (attendance) city, state
Regular season
11/14/2014*; 8:30 pm, FSSW+		McNeese State	W 80–39	1–0	Ferrell Center (6,158); Waco, TX
11/18/2014*; 11:00 am, ESPN		at South Carolina; ESPN College Hoops Tip-Off Marathon	W 69–65	2–0	Colonial Life Arena (13,291); Columbia, SC
11/21/2014*; 6:30 pm, FSSW		Prairie View A&M; Las Vegas Invitational Opening Round	W 60–45	3–0	Ferrell Center (5,208); Waco, TX
11/24/2014*; 7:00 pm, FSSW		Stephen F. Austin; Las Vegas Invitational Opening Round	W 67–51	4–0	Ferrell Center (5,503); Waco, TX
11/27/2014*; 10:59 pm, FS1		vs. Memphis; Las Vegas Invitational Semifinals	W 71–47	5–0	Orleans Arena (N/A); Paradise, NV
11/28/2014*; 9:30 pm, FS1		vs. Illinois; Las Vegas Invitational Championship	L 54–62	5–1	Orleans Arena (N/A); Las Vegas, NV
12/01/2014*; 8:00 pm, ESPNU		Texas Southern	W 75–49	6–1	Ferrell Center (4,286); Waco, TX
12/04/2014*; 6:00 pm, ESPNU		at Vanderbilt; Big 12/SEC Challenge	W 66–63	7–1	Memorial Gymnasium (7,740); Nashville, TN
12/09/2014*; 8:00 pm, ESPN2		Texas A&M	W 77–63	8–1	Ferrell Center (7,265); Waco, TX
12/17/2014*; 8:00 pm, ESPNU		New Mexico State	W 66–55	9–1	Ferrell Center (4,787); Waco, TX
12/22/2014*; 7:00 pm, FSSW	No. 22	Southern	W 70–66	10–1	Ferrell Center (5,379); Waco, TX
12/30/2014*; 7:00 pm, FSSW	No. 22	Norfolk State	W 92–51	11–1	Ferrell Center (5,138); Waco, TX
01/03/2015; 3:00 pm, ESPNU	No. 22	at No. 18 Oklahoma	L 63–73	11–2 (0–1)	Lloyd Noble Center (12,322); Norman, OK
01/07/2015; 8:00 pm, ESPNU	No. 21	No. 12 Kansas	L 55–56	11–3 (0–2)	Ferrell Center (7,088); Waco, TX
01/10/2015; 3:00 pm, ESPN2	No. 21	at TCU	W 66–59 ^{OT}	12–3 (1–2)	Wilkerson-Greines Activity Center (5,388); Fort Worth, TX
01/14/2015; 8:00 pm, ESPNU	No. 22	No. 11 Iowa State	W 74–73	13–3 (2–2)	Ferrell Center (6,576); Waco, TX
01/17/2015; 2:00 pm, ESPNU	No. 22	at Kansas State	L 61–63	13–4 (2–3)	Bramlage Coliseum (12,528); Manhattan, KS
01/21/2015*; 7:00 pm, FSSW	No. 21	Huston–Tillotson	W 81–61	14–4	Ferrell Center (4,760); Waco, TX
01/24/2015; 5:00 pm, ESPN2	No. 21	No. 19 Oklahoma	W 69–58	15–4 (3–3)	Ferrell Center (8,753); Waco, TX
01/27/2015; 8:00 pm, ESPNews	No. 20	at Oklahoma State	L 53–64	15–5 (3–4)	Gallagher-Iba Arena (7,364); Stillwater, OK
01/31/2015; 5:00 pm, ESPN2	No. 20	No. 19 Texas	W 83–60	16–5 (4–4)	Ferrell Center (9,680); Waco, TX
02/04/2015; 8:00 pm, ESPNews	No. 19	TCU	W 77–57	17–5 (5–4)	Ferrell Center (5,405); Waco, TX
02/07/2015; 11:00 am, ESPNU	No. 19	at No. 15 West Virginia	W 87–69	18–5 (6–4)	WVU Coliseum (12,783); Morgantown, WV
02/09/2015; 6:00 pm, ESPNU	No. 16	No. 21 Oklahoma State	L 65–74	18–6 (6–5)	Ferrell Center (6,720); Waco, TX
02/14/2015; 12:00 pm, CBS	No. 16	at No. 8 Kansas	L 64–74	18–7 (6–6)	Allen Fieldhouse (16,300); Lawrence, KS
02/17/2015; 6:00 pm, ESPN2	No. 20	at Texas Tech	W 54–49	19–7 (7–6)	United Supermarkets Arena (6,572); Lubbock, TX
02/21/2015; 12:00 pm, ESPNU	No. 20	Kansas State	W 69–42	20–7 (8–6)	Ferrell Center (8,046); Waco, TX
02/25/2015; 8:00 pm, ESPNU	No. 19	at No. 12 Iowa State	W 79–70	21–7 (9–6)	Hilton Coliseum (14,384); Ames, IA
02/28/2015; 3:00 pm, ESPNU	No. 19	No. 20 West Virginia	W 78–66	22–7 (10–6)	Ferrell Center (9,385); Waco, TX
03/02/2015; 6:00 pm, ESPN	No. 14	at Texas	L 59–61	22–8 (10–7)	Frank Erwin Center (12,139); Austin, TX
03/06/2015; 8:00 pm, ESPN2	No. 14	Texas Tech	W 77–74	23–8 (11–7)	Ferrell Center (9,554); Waco, TX
Big 12 tournament
03/12/2015; 11:30 am, ESPN2	(4) No. 16	vs. (5) No. 18 West Virginia; Quarterfinals	W 80–70	24–8	Sprint Center (18,972); Kansas City, MO
03/13/2015; 6:00 pm, ESPN2	(4) No. 16	vs. (1) No. 9 Kansas; Semifinals	L 52–62	24–9	Sprint Center (18,972); Kansas City, MO
NCAA tournament
03/19/2015*; 12:40 pm, TBS	(3 W) No. 16	vs. (14 W) Georgia State; First round	L 56–57	24–10	Veterans Memorial Arena (N/A); Jacksonville, FL
*Non-conference game. ^{#}Rankings from AP Poll. (#) Tournament seedings in parentheses. W=West Region. All times are in Central Time.

== Rankings ==
Ranking movement Legend: ██ Improvement in ranking. ██ Decrease in ranking. RV=Received votes.
Poll	Pre	Wk 2	Wk 3	Wk 4	Wk 5	Wk 6	Wk 7	Wk 8	Wk 9	Wk 10	Wk 11	Wk 12	Wk 13	Wk 14	Wk 15	Wk 16	Wk 17	Wk 18	Wk 19	Final
AP	RV	NR	NR	RV	RV	RV	22	22	21	22	21	20	19	16	20	19	14	16	16	N/A
Coaches	RV	RV	RV	RV	RV	RV	22	22	22	23	21	19	19	16	20	20	16	16	17	21
