= 2014–15 Kansas Jayhawks men's basketball team =

American college basketball season

2014–15 Kansas Jayhawks men's basketball

Big 12 regular season champions Orlando Classic champions

NCAA tournament, round of 32
- Conference: Big 12

Ranking
- Coaches: No. 17
- AP: No. 10
- Record: 27–9 (13–5 Big 12)
- Head coach: Bill Self (12th season)
- Assistant coaches: Jerrance Howard (2nd season); Norm Roberts (4th season); Kurtis Townsend (11th season)
- Home arena: Allen Fieldhouse

2014–15 Big 12 men's basketball standings
	Conf.				Overall
Team	W		L	PCT	W		L	PCT
No. 10 Kansas	13	–	5	.722	27	–	9	.750
No. 9 Iowa State †	12	–	6	.667	25	–	9	.735
No. 13 Oklahoma	12	–	6	.667	24	–	11	.686
No. 16 Baylor	11	–	7	.611	24	–	10	.706
No. 20 West Virginia	11	–	7	.611	25	–	10	.714
Oklahoma State	8	–	10	.444	18	–	14	.563
Texas	8	–	10	.444	20	–	14	.588
Kansas State	8	–	10	.444	15	–	17	.469
TCU	4	–	14	.222	18	–	15	.545
Texas Tech	3	–	15	.167	13	–	19	.406
† 2015 Big 12 Tournament winner Rankings from AP poll

The 2014–15 Kansas Jayhawks men's basketball team represented the University of Kansas in the 2014–15 NCAA Division I men's basketball season, which was the Jayhawks' 117th basketball season. The Jayhawks played their home games at Allen Fieldhouse. They were led by 12th year head coach Bill Self and were members of the Big 12 Conference. Despite losing 8 players, 5 who received substantial playing time, from the previous season, the Jayhawks still entered the season ranked 5th in the AP and Coaches poll, due in large part to a recruiting class ranked in the top 10 by Scout (4th), Rivals (3rd), and ESPN (9th). They finished the season 27–9, 13–5 in Big 12 play to finish win their 11th consecutive Big 12 regular season championship. They advanced to the championship game of the Big 12 tournament where they lost to Iowa State. They received an at-large bid to the NCAA tournament where they defeated New Mexico State in the second round before losing in the third round to cross state opponent, Wichita State. The Jayhawks 72–40 loss to Kentucky is the fewest points scored by Kansas in a game since the introduction of the shot clock in the 1985–86 season.

== Preseason ==
=== Departures ===
Name	Position	Reason
Justin Wesley	F	Graduation
Niko Roberts	G	Graduation
Tarik Black	F	Graduation
Andrew Wiggins	G	Entered NBA draft
Joel Embiid	C	Entered NBA Draft
Naadir Tharpe	G	Entered NBA D-League draft

=== Transfers ===
Name	Position	Old school	New school
Andrew White III	G	Kansas	Nebraska
Conner Frankamp	G	Kansas	Wichita State

=== Recruiting ===
Kansas recruits at the 2014 McDonald's All-American Boys Game

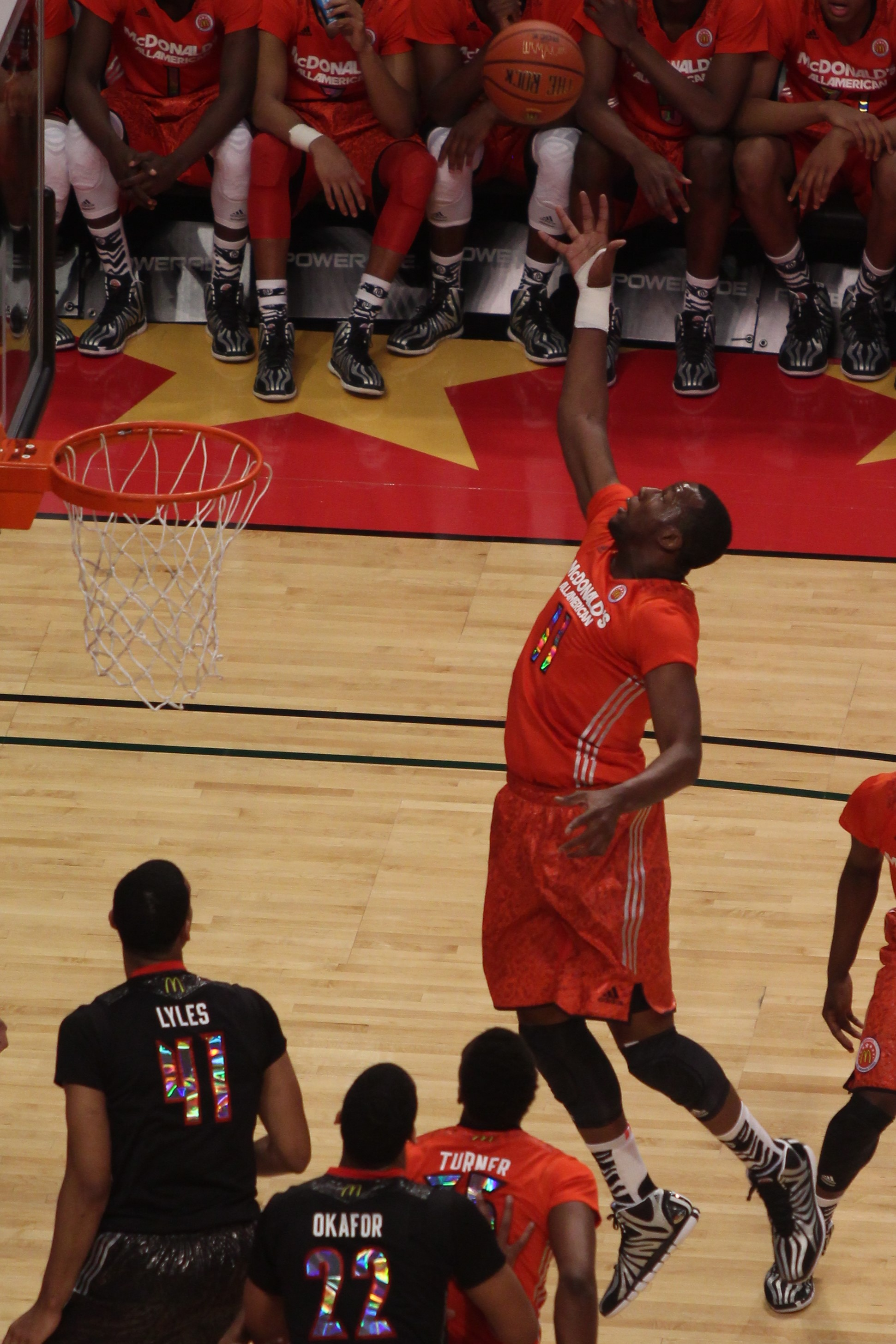
Cliff Alexander

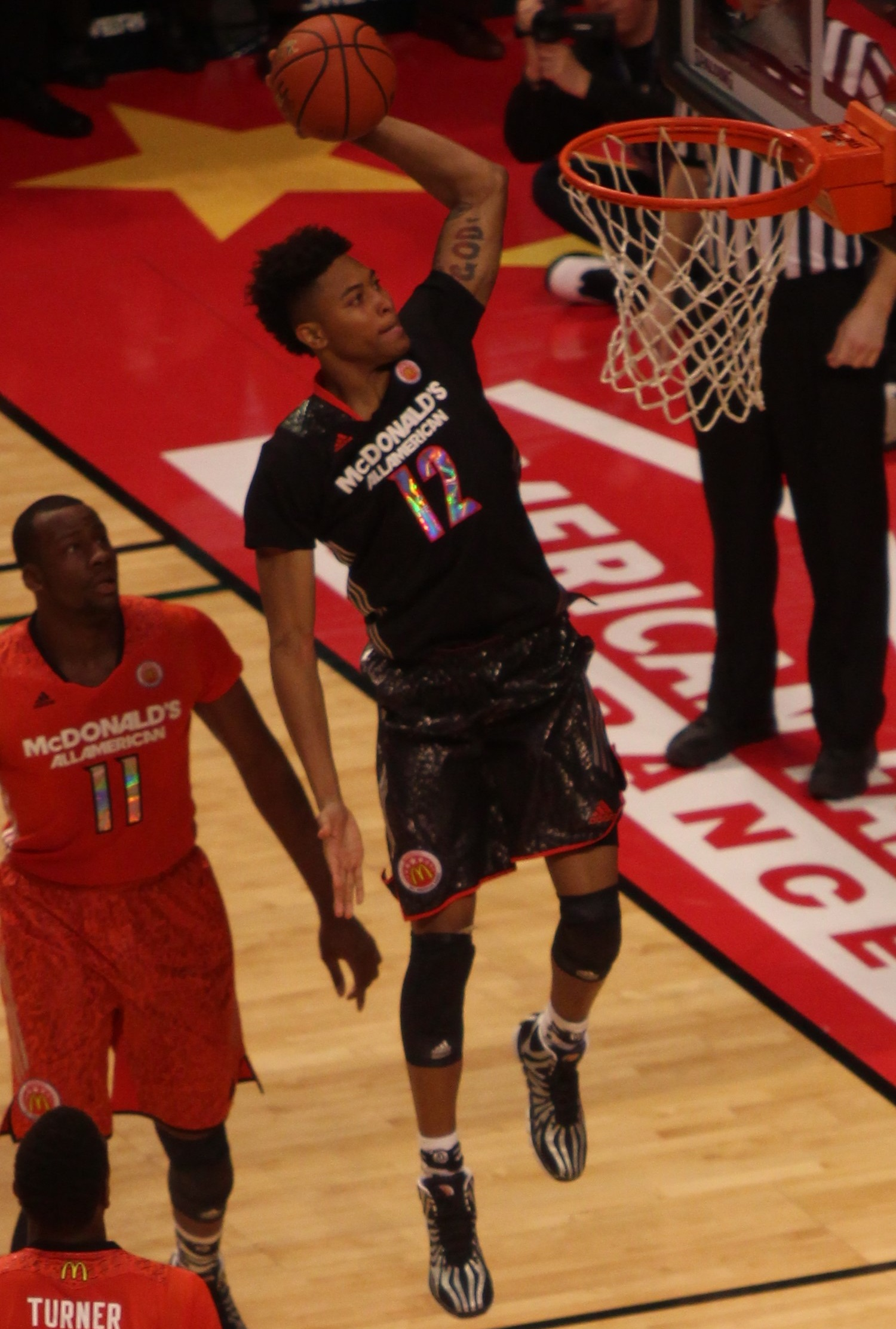
Kelly Oubre

College recruiting information
Name	Hometown	School	Height	Weight	Commit date
Cliff Alexander; PF	Chicago, IL	Curie High School	6 ft 9 in (2.06 m)	240 lb (110 kg)	Nov 15, 2013
Cliff Alexander; PF	Recruit ratings: Scout: Rivals: 247Sports: ESPN: (97)				
Devonte' Graham; PG	Raleigh, NC	Brewster Academy	6 ft 0 in (1.83 m)	160 lb (73 kg)	May 2, 2014
Devonte' Graham; PG	Recruit ratings: Scout: Rivals: 247Sports: ESPN: (83)				
Kelly Oubre; SF	Richmond, TX	Findlay College Prep	6 ft 7 in (2.01 m)	190 lb (86 kg)	Oct 8, 2013
Kelly Oubre; SF	Recruit ratings: Scout: Rivals: 247Sports: ESPN: (96)				
Sviatoslav Mykhailiuk; SG	Cherkasy, Ukraine	Cherkaski Mavpy (Ukrainian Super League)	6 ft 6 in (1.98 m)	180 lb (82 kg)	May 21, 2014
Sviatoslav Mykhailiuk; SG	Recruit ratings: Scout: Rivals: 247Sports: ESPN: (NR)				
Overall recruiting rankings: Scout: 4 Rivals: 3 247 Sports: 9 ESPN: 9

== Roster ==
2014–15 Kansas Jayhawks men's basketball team
Players
Coaches

Pos.	#	Name	Height	Weight	Year	Hometown
G	0	Frank Mason III	5 ft 11 in (1.8 m)	185 lb (84 kg)	So	Petersburg, VA
G	1	Wayne Selden Jr.	6 ft 5 in (1.96 m)	230 lb (104 kg)	So	Boston, MA
F	2	Cliff Alexander	6 ft 8 in (2.03 m)	240 lb (109 kg)	Fr	Chicago, IL
G	4	Devonte' Graham	6 ft 2 in (1.88 m)	175 lb (79 kg)	Fr	Raleigh, NC
G	5	Evan Manning	6 ft 3 in (1.91 m)	170 lb (77 kg)	Jr	Lawrence, KS
G	10	Sviatoslav Mykhailiuk	6 ft 8 in (2.03 m)	195 lb (88 kg)	Fr	Cherkasy, Ukraine
G	11	Tyler Self	6 ft 2 in (1.88 m)	165 lb (75 kg)	RS So	Lawrence, KS
G	12	Kelly Oubre Jr.	6 ft 7 in (2.01 m)	200 lb (91 kg)	Fr	New Orleans, LA
G	14	Brannen Greene	6 ft 7 in (2.01 m)	215 lb (98 kg)	So	Monroe, GA
G	15	Christian Garrett	6 ft 3 in (1.91 m)	185 lb (84 kg)	RS Sr	Los Angeles, CA
G	22	Josh Pollard (W)	6 ft 4 in (1.93 m)	200 lb (91 kg)	Fr	Cedar Hills, UT
F	31	Jamari Traylor	6 ft 8 in (2.03 m)	220 lb (100 kg)	RS Jr	Chicago, IL
F	33	Landen Lucas	6 ft 10 in (2.08 m)	240 lb (109 kg)	RS So	Portland, OR
F	34	Perry Ellis	6 ft 8 in (2.03 m)	225 lb (102 kg)	Jr	Wichita, KS
F	42	Hunter Mickelson	6 ft 10 in (2.08 m)	245 lb (111 kg)	RS Jr	Jonesboro, AR

Head coach

- Bill Self (Oklahoma State)

Assistant coach(es)

- Norm Roberts (Queens)
- Kurtis Townsend (Western Kentucky)
- Jerrance Howard (Illinois)

Legend

- (C) Team captain
- (S) Suspended
- (I) Ineligible
- (W) Walk-on
- Injured
- Current redshirt

Roster
Last update: November 6, 2014

== Schedule ==
Date time, TV	Rank^{#}	Opponent^{#}	Result	Record	High points	High rebounds	High assists	Site (attendance) city, state
Exhibition
11/03/2014*; 7:00 pm, Jayhawk TV/ESPN3	No. 5	Washburn	W 85–53	1–0	14 – Alexander	9 – Alexander	7 – Mason III	Allen Fieldhouse (16,300); Lawrence, KS
11/11/2014*; 7:00 pm, Jayhawk TV/ESPN3	No. 5	Emporia State	W 109–56	2–0	13 – 2 tied	6 – 2 tied	6 – Selden	Allen Fieldhouse (16,300); Lawrence, KS
Non-conference regular season
11/14/2014*; 7:00 pm, Jayhawk TV/ESPN3	No. 5	UC Santa Barbara	W 69–59	1–0	14 – Graham	10 – 2 tied	3 – Mykhailiuk	Allen Fieldhouse (16,300); Lawrence, KS
11/18/2014*; 8:00 pm, ESPN	No. 5	vs. No. 1 Kentucky; Champions Classic	L 40–72	1–1	9 – Selden, Jr	7 – Alexander	1 – 4 tied	Bankers Life Fieldhouse (19,306); Indianapolis, IN
11/24/2014*; 7:00 pm, Jayhawk TV/ESPN3	No. 11	Rider	W 87–60	2–1	17 – 2 tied	5 – 2 tied	9 – Selden Jr.	Allen Fieldhouse (16,300); Lawrence, KS
11/27/2014*; 1:30 pm, ESPN2	No. 11	vs. Rhode Island; Orlando Classic	W 76–60	3–1	17 – Ellis	8 – Alexander	5 – Mason III	HP Field House (3,915); Lake Buena Vista, FL
11/28/2014*; 11:00 am, ESPN	No. 11	vs. Tennessee; Orlando Classic semi-finals	W 82–67	4–1	24 – Ellis	13 – Ellis	7 – Mason III	HP Fieldhouse (N/A); Lake Buena Vista, FL
11/30/2014*; 12:00 pm, ESPN	No. 11	vs. No. 20 Michigan State; Orlando Classic championship	W 61–56	5–1	17 – Ellis	10 – Mason III	5 – Mason III	HP Fieldhouse (4,842); Lake Buena Vista, FL
12/05/2014*; 8:00 pm, ESPN	No. 11	Florida	W 71–65	6–1	21 – Selden Jr.	10 – Alexander	3 – Graham	Allen Fieldhouse (16,300); Lawrence, KS
12/10/2014*; 6:00 pm, Fox Sports 1	No. 10	at Georgetown	W 75–70	7–1	19 – Greene	10 – Ellis	3 – 2 tied	Verizon Center (14,164); Washington, D.C.
12/13/2014*; 2:15 pm, ESPN	No. 10	vs. No. 13 Utah	W 63–60	8–1	14 – Ellis	6 – 2 tied	5 – Mason III	Sprint Center (17,627); Kansas City, MO
12/20/2014*; 2:00 pm, Jayhawk TV/ESPN3	No. 10	Lafayette	W 96–69	9–1	23 – Oubre Jr.	10 – Oubre Jr.	9 – Mason III	Allen Fieldhouse (16,300); Lawrence, KS
12/22/2014*; 6:00 pm, ESPN2	No. 10	at Temple	L 52–77	9–2	20 – Mason III	7 – Oubre Jr.	3 – Selden Jr.	Wells Fargo Center (11,188); Philadelphia, PA
12/30/2014*; 7:00 pm, Jayhawk TV/ESPN3	No. 13	Kent State	W 78–62	10–2	20 – Oubre Jr.	8 – Ellis	4 – 2 tied	Allen Fieldhouse (16,300); Lawrence, KS
01/04/2015*; 3:30 pm, CBS	No. 13	UNLV	W 76–61	11–2	18 – Mason III	12 – Oubre Jr	7 – Mason III	Allen Fieldhouse (16,300); Lawrence, KS
Big 12 regular season
01/07/2015; 8:00 pm, ESPNU	No. 12	at No. 21 Baylor	W 56–55	12–2 (1–0)	13 – Traylor	5 – 2 tied	5 – Mason III	Ferrell Center (7,088); Waco, TX
01/10/2015; 2:00 pm, ESPNU	No. 12	Texas Tech	W 86–54	13–2 (2–0)	15 – Ellis	6 – Graham	6 – Graham	Allen Fieldhouse (16,300); Lawrence, KS
01/13/2015; 6:00 pm, ESPN2	No. 9	No. 24 Oklahoma State	W 67–57	14–2 (3–0)	16 – Mason III	9 – Mason III	3 – 3 tied	Allen Fieldhouse (16,300); Lawrence, KS
01/17/2015; 8:00 pm, ESPN	No. 9	at No. 11 Iowa State	L 81–86	14–3 (3–1)	21 – Mason III	11 – Ellis	4 – Graham	Hilton Coliseum (14,384); Ames, IA
01/19/2015; 8:00 pm, ESPN	No. 11	No. 19 Oklahoma	W 85–78	15–3 (4–1)	19 – Oubre Jr.	13 – Alexander	4 – 3 tied	Allen Fieldhouse (16,300); Lawrence, KS
01/24/2015; 1:00 pm, CBS	No. 11	at No. 17 Texas	W 75–62	16–3 (5–1)	15 – Alexander	9 – Alexander	4 – Mason III	Frank Erwin Center (16,540); Austin, TX
01/28/2015; 8:00 pm, ESPNU	No. 9	at TCU	W 64–61	17–3 (6–1)	16 – Mason III	7 – Lucas	4 – Selden Jr.	Wilkerson-Greines Activity Center (5,439); Fort Worth, TX
01/31/2015; 1:00 pm, ESPN	No. 9	Kansas State; Sunflower Showdown	W 68–57	18–3 (7–1)	16 – Ellis	12 – Ellis	4 – Graham	Allen Fieldhouse (16,300); Lawrence, KS
02/02/2015; 8:00 pm, ESPN	No. 8	No. 11 Iowa State	W 89–76	19–3 (8–1)	20 – Selden Jr.	6 – 2 tied	8 – Mason III	Allen Fieldhouse (16,300); Lawrence, KS
02/07/2015; 1:00 pm, ESPN	No. 8	at Oklahoma State	L 62–67	19–4 (8–2)	15 – Selden Jr.	10 – Ellis	4 – Mason III	Gallagher-Iba Arena (10,399); Stillwater, OK
02/10/2015; 8:00 pm, ESPN2	No. 8	at Texas Tech	W 73–51	20–4 (9–2)	16 – Selden Jr.	9 – Ellis	8 – Mason III	United Supermarkets Arena (8,397); Lubbock, TX
02/14/2015; 12:00 pm, CBS	No. 8	No. 16 Baylor	W 74–64	21–4 (10–2)	18 – 2 tied	6 – 2 tied	8 – Mason III	Allen Fieldhouse (16,300); Lawrence, KS
02/16/2015; 8:00 pm, ESPN	No. 8	at No. 23 West Virginia	L 61–62	21–5 (10–3)	19 – Ellis	7 – Oubre Jr.	3 – 2 tied	WVU Coliseum (7,033); Morgantown, WV
02/21/2015; 3:00 pm, ESPN2	No. 8	TCU	W 81–72	22–5 (11–3)	23 – Ellis	7 – Ellis	5 – Mason III	Allen Fieldhouse (16,300); Lawrence, KS
02/23/2015; 8:00 pm, ESPN	No. 8	at Kansas State	L 63–70	22–6 (11–4)	24 – Ellis	9 – Ellis	4 – Selden Jr	Bramlage Coliseum (12,528); Manhattan, KS
02/28/2015; 4:00 pm, ESPN	No. 8	Texas	W 69–64	23–6 (12–4)	28 – Ellis	13 – Ellis	3 – Mason III	Allen Fieldhouse (16,300); Lawrence, KS
03/03/2015; 8:00 pm, ESPN2	No. 9	No. 20 West Virginia	W 76–69 ^{OT}	24–6 (13–4)	19 – Mason III	9 – Traylor	3 – Mason III	Allen Fieldhouse (16,300); Lawrence, KS
03/07/2015; 3:00 pm, ESPN	No. 9	at No. 15 Oklahoma	L 73–75	24–7 (13–5)	21 – Mason III	12 – Lucas	3 – Graham	Lloyd Noble Center (12,104); Norman, OK
Big 12 Tournament
03/12/2015; 1:30 pm, ESPN2	No. 9	vs. TCU; Quarterfinals	W 64–59	25–7	25 – Oubre Jr.	7 – Lucas	4 – Graham	Sprint Center (18,972); Kansas City, MO
03/13/2015; 6:00 pm, ESPN2	No. 9	vs. No. 16 Baylor; Semifinals	W 62–52	26–7	20 – Selden Jr.	8 – Selden Jr.	4 – Mason III	Sprint Center (18,972); Kansas City, MO
03/14/2015; 5:00 pm, ESPN	No. 9	vs. No. 13 Iowa State; Championship game	L 66–70	26–8	25 – Selden Jr.	9 – Ellis	4 – 2 tied	Sprint Center (19,075); Kansas City, MO
NCAA tournament
03/20/2015*; 11:15 am, CBS	No. 10 (2 MW)	vs. No. (15 MW) New Mexico State; First Round	W 75–56	27–8	17 – Mason III	9 – 2 tied	4 – 2 tied	CenturyLink Center (16,907); Omaha, NE
03/22/2015*; 4:15 pm, CBS	No. 10 (2 MW)	vs. No. 14 (7 MW) Wichita State; Second Round	L 65–78	27–9	17 – Ellis, Graham	10 – Lucas	3 – Graham	CenturyLink Center (17,563); Omaha, NE
*Non-conference game. ^{#}Rankings from AP Poll. (#) Tournament seedings in parentheses. MW=Midwest Region.

== Rankings ==
Ranking movements Legend: ██ Increase in ranking ██ Decrease in ranking
	Week																			
Poll	Pre	2	3	4	5	6	7	8	9	10	11	12	13	14	15	16	17	18	19	Final
AP	5	5	11	11	10	10	10	13	12	9	11	9	8	8	8	8	9	9	10	N/A*
Coaches	5	5	12	11	10	10	10	14	13	10	14	11	9	9	8	9	10	10	11	17

*AP does not release post-tournament rankings
