= 2015 Big 12 men's basketball tournament =

- Classification: Division I
- Season: 2014–15
- Teams: 10
- Site: Sprint Center; Kansas City, Missouri
- Champions: Iowa State (3rd title)
- Winning coach: Fred Hoiberg (2nd title)
- MVP: Georges Niang (Iowa State)
- Attendance: 94,963 (overall); 19,075 (championship)
- Top scorer: Georges Niang (Iowa State) (54 points)
- Television: ESPN, ESPN2, ESPNU

2014–15 Big 12 men's basketball standings
	Conf.				Overall
Team	W		L	PCT	W		L	PCT
No. 10 Kansas	13	–	5	.722	27	–	9	.750
No. 9 Iowa State †	12	–	6	.667	25	–	9	.735
No. 13 Oklahoma	12	–	6	.667	24	–	11	.686
No. 16 Baylor	11	–	7	.611	24	–	10	.706
No. 20 West Virginia	11	–	7	.611	25	–	10	.714
Oklahoma State	8	–	10	.444	18	–	14	.563
Texas	8	–	10	.444	20	–	14	.588
Kansas State	8	–	10	.444	15	–	17	.469
TCU	4	–	14	.222	18	–	15	.545
Texas Tech	3	–	15	.167	13	–	19	.406
† 2015 Big 12 Tournament winner Rankings from AP poll

The 2015 Big 12 men's basketball tournament was the postseason men's basketball tournament for the Big 12 Conference. It was played from March 11 to 14 in Kansas City, Missouri at the Sprint Center. Iowa State won the tournament for the third time and received the conference's automatic bid to the 2015 NCAA Division I men's basketball tournament.

== Seeding ==
The Tournament consisted of a 10 team single-elimination tournament with the top 6 seeds receiving a bye.

2015 Big 12 Men's Basketball Tournament seeds
Seed	School	Conf.	Over.	Tiebreaker
1	Kansas ‡#	13–5	27–9	
2	Iowa State #	12–6	25–9	1–1 vs. OU; 1–1 vs. KU; 3–1 vs. BU/WVU
3	Oklahoma #	12–6	24–11	1–1 vs. ISU; 1–1 vs. KU; 2–2 vs. BU/WVU
4	Baylor #	11–7	24–10	2–0 vs. WVU
5	West Virginia #	11–7	25–10	0–2 vs. WVU
6	Oklahoma State #	8–10	18–14	3–1 vs. UT & KSU
7	Texas	8–10	20–14	2–2 vs. OSU/KSU; 2–0 vs. KSU
8	Kansas State	8–10	15–17	1–3 vs. OSU/UT; 0–2 vs. UT
9	TCU	4–14	18–15	
10	Texas Tech	3–15	13–19	
‡ – Big 12 Conference regular season champions, and tournament No. 1 seed. # – Received a single-bye in the conference tournament. Overall records include all games played in the Big 12 Conference tournament.

== Schedule ==
Session	Game	Time	Matchup	Television	Attendance
First Round – Wednesday, March 11
1	1	6:00 pm	#9 TCU 67 vs #8 Kansas State 65	ESPNU	18,972
1	2	8:00 pm	#7 Texas 65 vs #10 Texas Tech 53	ESPNU	18,972
Quarterfinals – Thursday, March 12
2	3	11:30 am	#4 Baylor 80 vs #5 West Virginia 70	ESPN2	18,972
2	4	1:30 pm	#1 Kansas 64 vs #9 TCU 59	ESPN2	18,972
3	5	6:00 pm	#2 Iowa State 69 vs #7 Texas 67	ESPNU	18,972
3	6	8:00 pm	#3 Oklahoma 64 vs #6 Oklahoma State 49	ESPNU	18,972
Semifinals – Friday, March 13
4	7	6:00 pm	#1 Kansas 62 vs #4 Baylor 52	ESPN2	18,972
4	8	8:00 pm	#2 Iowa State 67 vs #3 Oklahoma 65	ESPN2	18,972
Final – Saturday, March 14
5	9	5:00 pm	#2 Iowa State 70 vs #1 Kansas 66	ESPN	19,075
Game times in CT. #-Rankings denote tournament seed

== Bracket ==
First round Wednesday, March 11
8	Kansas State	65
9	TCU	67
7	Texas	65
10	Texas Tech	53

Quarterfinals; Thursday, March 12
1	#9 Kansas	64
9	TCU	59
4	#16 Baylor	80
5	#18 West Virginia	70
2	#13 Iowa State	69
7	Texas	67
3	#15 Oklahoma	64
6	Oklahoma State	49

Semifinals; Friday, March 13
1	#9 Kansas	62
4	#16 Baylor	52
2	#13 Iowa State	67
3	#15 Oklahoma	65

Championship; Saturday, March 14
1	#9 Kansas	66
2	#13 Iowa State	70

* denotes overtime period

== All-Tournament Team ==
Most Outstanding Player – Georges Niang, Iowa State

Player	Team	Position	Class
Georges Niang	Iowa State	Jr.	F
Monte Morris	Iowa State	So.	G
Rico Gathers	Baylor	Jr.	F
Wayne Selden	Kansas	So.	G
Buddy Hield	Oklahoma	Jr.	G

== See also ==
- 2015 Big 12 Conference women's basketball tournament
- 2015 NCAA Division I men's basketball tournament
- 2014–15 NCAA Division I men's basketball rankings
