= Landen Lucas =

American basketball player (born 1993)

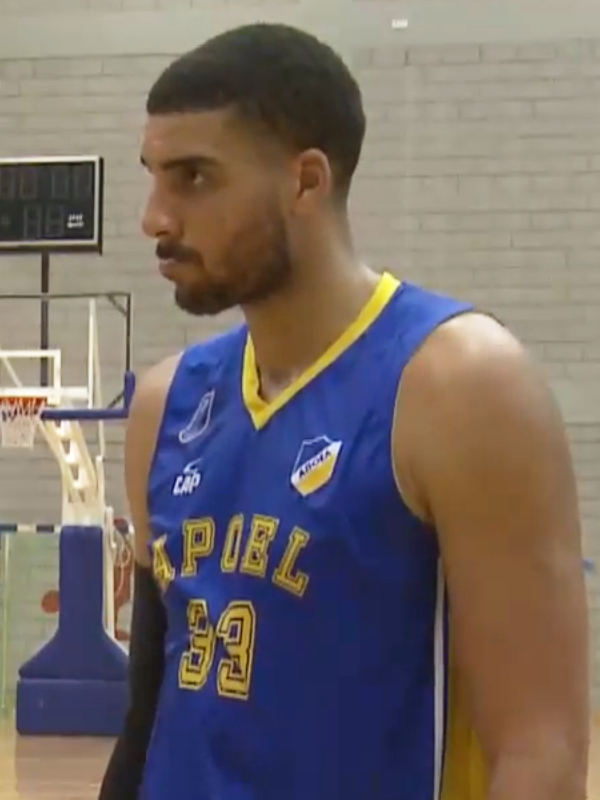
- Lucas at APOEL B.C. in 2021

Free agent
- Position: Power forward / center

Personal information
- Born: October 3, 1993 (age 33) Portland, Oregon, U.S.
- Listed height: 6 ft 10 in (2.08 m)
- Listed weight: 250 lb (113 kg)

Career information
- High school: Sunset (Portland, Oregon); Findlay Prep (Henderson, Nevada); Westview (Beaverton, Oregon)
- College: Kansas (2013–2017)
- NBA draft: 2017: undrafted
- Playing career: 2017–present

Career history
- 2017–2018: Alvark Tokyo
- 2018: BC Kalev
- 2020–2021: APOEL

Career highlights
- B.League champion (2018)
Medals
Men's basketball
Representing United States
Summer Universiade
Gold medal – first place	2015 Gwangju	Team competition

Landen Allen Lucas (born October 3, 1993) is an American professional basketball player. He played college basketball for the Kansas Jayhawks.

== High school career ==
Began his high school career at Sunset High School in Portland, moved to Findlay Prep in Henderson, Nevada, as a junior, and was back in Portland at Westview High School for his senior season. At Findlay Prep, Lucas averaged six points, six rebounds and two blocked shots per game. He averaged 21 points, 14 rebounds, and four blocks per game as a senior at Westview High School. Recorded his best game as a senior when he scored 32 points, pulled down 22 rebounds, and blocked 11 shots. Landen was rated a three-star recruit by Rivals.

== College career ==
As a sophomore, Lucas averaged 3.5 points and 4.3 rebounds per game and made 14 starts. Lucas averaged 5.8 points per game as a junior at Kansas. In the offseason, he worked on his offensive game with former Jayhawk Wayne Simien. Lucas scored a career-high 18 points to go with 12 rebounds in a 90–88 win against Kansas State on January 4, 2017. As a senior, Lucas was an All-Big 12 Honorable Mention. He averaged eight points and 8.3 rebounds per game on a team that finished 31–5.

== Professional career ==
=== Alvark Tokyo (2017–2018) ===
Lucas worked out for several NBA teams prior to the 2017 NBA draft but went undrafted. Later Lucas played for the Boston Celtics in the NBA Summer League. In July 2017, Lucas joined Alvark Tokyo of the Japanese B.League. Lucas already speaks Japanese, having lived in the country in his youth.

=== Kalev/Cramo (2018) ===
On September 3, 2018, Lucas signed a trial contract with Kalev/Cramo of the Estonian league. In November, the team announced that he would not be retained on a permanent contract.

On January 14, 2019, Antwerp Giants of the Belgian Pro Basketball League announced that Lucas would be joining the team for the remainder of the season. He did not pass his physical and did not play for the Giants.

=== APOEL B.C. (2020–2021) ===
After taking a year off from professional basketball, Lucas signed with APOEL B.C. of the Cyprus Basketball Division A on September 30, 2020.

== National team career ==
Lucas and the Kansas Jayhawks competed on behalf of the United States in the 2015 World University Games.

== Career statistics ==
Legend
GP	Games played	GS	Games started	MPG	Minutes per game
FG%	Field goal percentage	3P%	3-point field goal percentage	FT%	Free throw percentage
RPG	Rebounds per game	APG	Assists per game	SPG	Steals per game
BPG	Blocks per game	PPG	Points per game	**Bold**	Career high

=== College ===
Year	Team	GP	GS	MPG	FG%	3P%	FT%	RPG	APG	SPG	BPG	PPG
2012–13	Kansas	Redshirt										
2013–14	Kansas	22	0	4.9	.571	—	.500	1.4	.0	.1	.3	1.5
2014–15	Kansas	32	14	15.2	.532	—	**.667**	4.3	.4	.3	.6	3.5
2015–16	Kansas	**36**	19	18.4	**.643**	.000	.663	6.8	.6	.4	.8	5.8
2016–17	Kansas	35	**30**	**25.6**	.631	—	.624	**8.3**	**1.1**	**.5**	**1.0**	**8.0**
Career		125	63	17.2	.612	.000	.636	5.6	.6	.4	.7	5.1
