= 2014–15 Kansas State Wildcats men's basketball team =

American college basketball season

2014–15 Kansas State Wildcats men's basketball
- Conference: Big 12 Conference
- Record: 15–17 (8–10 Big 12)
- Head coach: Bruce Weber (3rd season)
- Assistant coaches: Chris Lowery; Alvin Brooks III; Chester Frazier
- Home arena: Bramlage Coliseum (12,528)

2014–15 Big 12 men's basketball standings
| | Conf. | | | | Overall |
| Team | W | | L | PCT | W | | L | PCT |
|---|---|---|---|---|---|---|---|---|
| No. 10 Kansas | 13 | – | 5 | .722 | 27 | – | 9 | .750 |
| No. 9 Iowa State † | 12 | – | 6 | .667 | 25 | – | 9 | .735 |
| No. 13 Oklahoma | 12 | – | 6 | .667 | 24 | – | 11 | .686 |
| No. 16 Baylor | 11 | – | 7 | .611 | 24 | – | 10 | .706 |
| No. 20 West Virginia | 11 | – | 7 | .611 | 25 | – | 10 | .714 |
| Oklahoma State | 8 | – | 10 | .444 | 18 | – | 14 | .563 |
| Texas | 8 | – | 10 | .444 | 20 | – | 14 | .588 |
| Kansas State | 8 | – | 10 | .444 | 15 | – | 17 | .469 |
| TCU | 4 | – | 14 | .222 | 18 | – | 15 | .545 |
| Texas Tech | 3 | – | 15 | .167 | 13 | – | 19 | .406 |
† 2015 Big 12 Tournament winner Rankings from AP poll

The 2014–15 Kansas State Wildcats men's basketball team represented Kansas State University in the 2014–15 NCAA Division I men's basketball season. Their head coach was Bruce Weber, and was his third year at the helm of the Wildcats. The team played its home games in Bramlage Coliseum in Manhattan, Kansas, its home court since 1988. Kansas State was a member of the Big 12 Conference.

== Preseason ==
The Wildcats finished the previous season 20–13, 10–8 in Big 12 play to finish in fifth place. They lost in the quarterfinals of the Big 12 tournament to Iowa State. They received an at-large bid to the NCAA tournament where they lost in the second round to Kentucky.

=== Departures ===
| Name | Number | Pos. | Height | Weight | Year | Hometown | Notes |
|---|---|---|---|---|---|---|---|
| Shane Southwell | 1 | G | 6'7" | 215 | Senior | Harlem, NY | Graduated |
| Omari Lawrence | 13 | G | 6'3" | 205 | Senior | Bronx, NY | Graduated |
| Ryan Schultz | 24 | F | 6'5" | 205 | Senior | Wichita, KS | Graduated |
| Will Spradling | 55 | G | 6'2" | 185 | Senior | Overland Park, KS | Graduated |

=== Incoming transfers ===
| Name | Number | Pos. | Height | Weight | Year | Hometown | Previous School |
|---|---|---|---|---|---|---|---|
| Stephen Hurt | 41 | C | 7'0" | 275 | Junior | Murfreesboro, TN | Northwest Florida State College |

=== Class of 2014 recruits ===
College recruiting
| Name | Hometown | School | Height | Weight | Commit date |
|---|---|---|---|---|---|
| Malek Harris; PF | Orland Park, IL | Carl Sandburg High School | 6 ft 7 in (2.01 m) | 200 lb (91 kg) | May 11, 2014 |
| Malek Harris; PF | Recruit ratings: Scout: Rivals: 247Sports: ESPN: | | | | |
| Tre Harris; SG | Edwardsville, IL | Fishburne Military School | 6 ft 5 in (1.96 m) | 185 lb (84 kg) | Oct 26, 2013 |
| Tre Harris; SG | Recruit ratings: Scout: Rivals: 247Sports: ESPN: | | | | |
Overall recruit ranking: Scout: Not Ranked Top 20 Rivals: Not Ranked Top 25 ESPN: Not Ranked Top 25
Note: In many cases, Scout, Rivals, 247Sports, On3, and ESPN may conflict in their listings of height and weight.; In these cases, the average was taken. ESPN grades are on a 100-point scale.; Sources: "2014 Kansas State Basketball Commits". Rivals.; "2014 Kansas State Basketball Commits". Scout.; "2014 Kansas State Basketball Commits". ESPN.; "Scout.com Team Recruiting Rankings". Scout.; "2014 Team Ranking". Rivals.

== Roster ==
2014–15 Kansas State Wildcats men's basketball team
Players
Coaches

| Pos. | # | Name | Height | Weight | Year | Hometown |
|---|---|---|---|---|---|---|
| G | 1 | Jevon Thomas | 6 ft 0 in (1.83 m) | 180 lb (82 kg) | So | Queens, NY |
| G | 2 | Marcus Foster | 6 ft 2 in (1.88 m) | 200 lb (91 kg) | So | Wichita Falls, TX |
| F | 3 | Jack Karapetyan | 6 ft 7 in (2.01 m) | 220 lb (100 kg) | RS Fr | Los Angeles, CA |
| G | 5 | Tre Harris | 6 ft 5 in (1.96 m) | 195 lb (88 kg) | Fr | Edwardsville, IL |
| F | 10 | Malek Harris | 6 ft 7 in (2.01 m) | 200 lb (91 kg) | Fr | Orland Park, IL |
| F | 11 | Nino Williams | 6 ft 5 in (1.96 m) | 220 lb (100 kg) | RS Sr | Saint Louis, MO |
| G | 14 | Justin Edwards | 6 ft 4 in (1.93 m) | 195 lb (88 kg) | RS Jr | Whitby, OT |
| F | 21 | Brandon Bolden | 6 ft 11 in (2.11 m) | 210 lb (95 kg) | RS So | Sumter, SC |
| G | 23 | Nigel Johnson | 6 ft 1 in (1.85 m) | 180 lb (82 kg) | So | Ashburn, VA |
| F | 25 | Wesley Iwundu | 6 ft 7 in (2.01 m) | 195 lb (88 kg) | So | Houston, TX |
| G | 32 | Evan Beucler (W) | 6 ft 5 in (1.96 m) | 180 lb (82 kg) | Fr | Dallas, TX |
| G | 33 | Brian Rohleder | 6 ft 3 in (1.91 m) | 215 lb (98 kg) | RS Jr | Wichita, KS |
| G | 40 | Shawn Meyer | 6 ft 3 in (1.91 m) | 215 lb (98 kg) | Sr | Kansas City, MO |
| F | 41 | Stephen Hurt | 6 ft 11 in (2.11 m) | 260 lb (118 kg) | Jr | Murfreesboro, TN |
| F | 42 | Thomas Gipson | 6 ft 7 in (2.01 m) | 265 lb (120 kg) | Sr | Ceder Hill, TX |
| F | 50 | D. J. Johnson | 6 ft 9 in (2.06 m) | 250 lb (113 kg) | Jr | Saint Louis, MO |

Head coach

- Bruce Weber (Wisconsin–Milwaukee)

Assistant coach(es)

- Chris Lowery (Southern Illinois)
- Alvin Brooks III (Idaho State)
- Chester Frazier (Illinois)

Legend

- (C) Team captain
- (S) Suspended
- (I) Ineligible
- (W) Walk-on
- Injured
- Current redshirt

Roster
Last update: 2014-06-13

== Schedule ==
| Date time, TV | Rank^{#} | Opponent^{#} | Result | Record | High points | High rebounds | High assists | Site (attendance) city, state |
Exhibition
| 11/09/2014*; 2:00 pm, FSMW | | Washburn | W 68–56 | | 17 – Foster | 6 – Foster | 8 – Thomas | Bramlage Coliseum (12,391); Manhattan, KS |
Non-conference regular season
| 11/14/2014*; 8:00 pm, FSKC | | Southern Utah | W 98–68 | 1–0 | 18 – Johnson | 6 – Gipson | 5 – Tied | Bramlage Coliseum (12,405); Manhattan, KS |
| 11/17/2014*; 7:00 pm, FSMW | | UMKC; Maui Invitational Tournament Opening Round | W 83–73 | 2–0 | 21 – Gibson | 9 – Gibson | 9 – Thomas | Bramlage Coliseum (12,189); Manhattan, KS |
| 11/21/2014*; 9:30 pm, FSMW | | at Long Beach State | L 60–69 | 2–1 | 13 – Gibson | 8 – Hurt | 1 – Tied | Walter Pyramid (4,256); Long Beach, CA |
| 11/24/2014*; 1:30 pm, ESPN2 | | vs. Purdue; Maui Invitational Tournament quarterfinals | W 88–79 | 3–1 | 24 – Foster | 7 – Iwundu | 4 – Johnson | Lahaina Civic Center (2,400); Maui, HI |
| 11/25/2014*; 6:30 pm, ESPN | | vs. No. 3 Arizona; Maui Invitational Tournament semifinals | L 68–72 | 3–2 | 23 – Foster | 5 – Iwundu | 3 – Thomas | Lahaina Civic Center (2,400); Maui, HI |
| 11/26/2014*; 6:30 pm, ESPN2 | | vs. Pittsburgh; Maui Invitational Tournament 3rd Place Game | L 47–70 | 3–3 | 13 – Gipson | 6 – Tied | 3 – Johnson | Lahaina Civic Center (2,400); Maui, HI |
| 12/02/2014*; 7:00 pm, FSKC | | Omaha | W 84–66 | 4–3 | 19 – Williams | 7 – Foster | 7 – Thomas | Bramlage Coliseum (12,126); Manhattan, KS |
| 12/06/2014*; 2:15 pm, ESPN2 | | at Tennessee; Big 12/SEC Challenge | L 64–65 | 4–4 | 23 – Foster | 8 – Williams | 6 – Thomas | Thompson–Boling Arena (14,111); Knoxville, TN |
| 12/09/2014*; 7:00 pm, ESPN3 | | Bradley | W 50–47 | 5–4 | 14 – Williams | 12 – Williams | 5 – Thomas | Bramlage Coliseum (12,238); Manhattan, KS |
| 12/14/2014*; 5:00 pm, FSMW | | Savannah State | W 73–53 | 6–4 | 20 – Williams | 7 – Williams | 7 – Foster | Bramlage Coliseum (12,266); Manhattan, KS |
| 12/20/2014*; 6:00 pm, ESPNU | | vs. Texas A&M; Wildcat Classic | W 71–64 | 7–4 | 17 – Williams | 6 – Gipson | 4 – Foster | Sprint Center (14,884); Kansas City, MO |
| 12/28/2014*; 2:00 pm, FSMW | | Texas Southern | L 56–58 | 7–5 | 17 – Foster | 6 – Thomas | 3 – Tied | Bramlage Coliseum (12,528); Manhattan, KS |
| 12/31/2014*; 3:00 pm, ESPNU | | Georgia | L 46–50 | 7–6 | 19 – Gipson | 9 – Gipson | 3 – Tied | Bramlage Coliseum (12,528); Manhattan, KS |
Big 12 regular season
| 01/03/2015; 11:00 am, ESPNU | | at Oklahoma State | L 47–61 | 7–7 (0–1) | 14 – Gipson | 5 – Edwards | 4 – Iwundu | Gallagher-Iba Arena (11,185); Stillwater, OK |
| 01/07/2015; 8:00 pm, ESPNews | | TCU | W 58–53 | 8–7 (1–1) | 23 – Foster | 9 – Williams | 4 – Thomas | Bramlage Coliseum (12,213); Manhattan, KS |
| 01/10/2015; 6:00 pm, ESPNU | | at No. 16 Oklahoma | W 66–63 | 9–7 (2–1) | 15 – Hurt | 9 – Edwards | 6 – Thomas | Lloyd Noble Center (12,426); Norman, OK |
| 01/14/2015; 8:00 pm, ESPNews | | Texas Tech | W 58–51 | 10–7 (3–1) | 14 – Foster | 5 – Foster | 4 – Foster | Bramlage Coliseum (12,264); Manhattan, KS |
| 01/17/2015; 2:00 pm, ESPNU | | No. 22 Baylor | W 63–61 | 11–7 (4–1) | 18 – Williams | 7 – Williams | 6 – Iwundu | Bramlage Coliseum (12,528); Manhattan, KS |
| 01/20/2015; 6:00 pm, ESPN2 | | at No. 9 Iowa State | L 71–77 | 11–8 (4–2) | 22 – Williams | 8 – Williams | 5 – Thomas | Hilton Coliseum (14,384); Ames, IA |
| 01/24/2015; 11:00 am, ESPN2 | | Oklahoma State | W 63–53 | 12–8 (5–2) | 20 – Williams | 7 – Williams | 5 – Foster | Bramlage Coliseum (12,528); Manhattan, KS |
| 01/27/2015; 6:00 pm, ESPN2 | | No. 17 West Virginia | L 59–65 | 12–9 (5–3) | 15 – Foster | 7 – Thomas | 3 – Iwundu | Bramlage Coliseum (12,528); Manhattan, KS |
| 01/31/2015; 1:00 pm, ESPN | | at No. 9 Kansas; Sunflower Showdown | L 57–68 | 12–10 (5–4) | 19 – Foster, Gipson | 7 – Gipson | 2 – 3 tied | Allen Fieldhouse (16,300); Lawrence, KS |
| 02/04/2015; 8:00 pm, ESPNU | | at Texas Tech | L 47–64 | 12–11 (5–5) | 13 – Gipson | 5 – Tied | 4 – Thomas | United Supermarkets Arena (7,429); Lubbock, TX |
| 02/07/2015; 3:00 pm, ESPN | | No. 25 Texas | L 57–61 | 12–12 (5–6) | 13 – Williams | 8 – Williams | 4 – Tied | Bramlage Coliseum (12,528); Manhattan, KS |
| 02/11/2015; 6:00 pm, ESPNU | | at No. 21 West Virginia | L 72–76 | 12–13 (5–7) | 22 – Williams | 6 – Gipson | 5 – Johnson | WVU Coliseum (8,762); Morgantown, WV |
| 02/14/2015; 7:00 pm, ESPN2 | | No. 17 Oklahoma | W 59–56 | 13–13 (6–7) | 14 – Foster | 8 – Williams | 2 – 3 tied | Bramlage Coliseum (12,528); Manhattan, KS |
| 02/18/2015; 7:00 pm, FSKC | | at TCU | L 55–69 | 13–14 (6–8) | 14 – Tied | 10 – Williams | 5 – Thomas | Wilkerson-Greines Activity Center (3,804); Fort Worth, TX |
| 02/21/2015; 12:00 pm, ESPNU | | No. 20 Baylor | L 42–69 | 13–15 (6–9) | 11 – Gipson | 6 – Gipson | 4 – T. Harris | Ferrell Center (8,046); Waco, TX |
| 02/23/2015; 8:00 pm, ESPN | | No. 8 Kansas; Sunflower Showdown | W 70–63 | 14–15 (7–9) | 15 – Williams | 6 – Gipson | 4 – Edwards | Bramlage Coliseum (12,528); Manhattan, KS |
| 02/28/2015; 3:00 pm, ESPN2 | | No. 12 Iowa State | W 70–69 | 15–15 (8–9) | 17 – Johnson | 9 – Tied | 4 – Tied | Bramlage Coliseum (12,528); Manhattan, KS |
| 03/07/2015; 3:00 pm, ESPN2 | | at Texas | L 49–62 | 15–16 (8–10) | 15 – Tied | 11 – Gipson | 3 – Foster | Erwin Center (12,053); Austin, TX |
Big 12 tournament
| 03/11/2015; 6:00 pm, ESPNU | | vs. TCU; First round | L 65-67 | 15-17 | 16 – Gipson | 10 – Williams | 4 – Thomas | Sprint Center; Kansas City, MO |
*Non-conference game. ^{#}Rankings from AP Poll. (#) Tournament seedings in parentheses. All times are in Central Time.
