= 2014–15 Oklahoma State Cowboys basketball team =

American college basketball season

2014–15 Oklahoma State Cowboys basketball

MGM Grand Main Event champions

NCAA tournament, round of 64
- Conference: Big 12 Conference
- Record: 18–14 (8–10 Big 12)
- Head coach: Travis Ford (7th season)
- Assistant coaches: James Dickey; Butch Pierre; Chris Ferguson
- Home arena: Gallagher-Iba Arena

2014–15 Big 12 men's basketball standings
	Conf.				Overall
Team	W		L	PCT	W		L	PCT
No. 10 Kansas	13	–	5	.722	27	–	9	.750
No. 9 Iowa State †	12	–	6	.667	25	–	9	.735
No. 13 Oklahoma	12	–	6	.667	24	–	11	.686
No. 16 Baylor	11	–	7	.611	24	–	10	.706
No. 20 West Virginia	11	–	7	.611	25	–	10	.714
Oklahoma State	8	–	10	.444	18	–	14	.563
Texas	8	–	10	.444	20	–	14	.588
Kansas State	8	–	10	.444	15	–	17	.469
TCU	4	–	14	.222	18	–	15	.545
Texas Tech	3	–	15	.167	13	–	19	.406
† 2015 Big 12 Tournament winner Rankings from AP poll

The 2014–15 Oklahoma State Cowboys basketball team represented Oklahoma State University in the 2014–15 NCAA Division I men's basketball season. This was head coach Travis Ford's seventh season at Oklahoma State. The Cowboys were members of the Big 12 Conference and played their home games at the Gallagher-Iba Arena. They finished the season 18–14, 8–10 in Big 12 play to finish in a three way tie for sixth place. They lost in the quarterfinals of the Big 12 tournament to Oklahoma. They received an at-large bid to the NCAA tournament where they lost in second round to Oregon.

== Departures ==
Name	Number	Pos.	Height	Weight	Year	Hometown	Notes
Marcus Smart	33	G	6'4"	225	Sophomore	Flower Mound, TX	Drafted by Boston Celtics
Markel Brown	22	G	6'3"	184	Senior	Alexandria, LA	Graduated; Drafted by Brooklyn Nets
Stevie Clark	5	G	5'11"	175	Freshman	Oklahoma City	Dismissed from team
Kamari Murphy	21	F	6'9"	220	Sophomore	Brooklyn	Transferred to Miami (FL)
Gary Gaskins	34	G	6'10"	200	Junior	Beaufort, SC	Transferred to Arkansas Tech

== Recruits ==
College recruiting
Name	Hometown	School	Height	Weight	Commit date
Joe Burton; SF	Humble, Texas		6 ft 6 in (1.98 m)	205 lb (93 kg)	Oct 21, 2013
Joe Burton; SF	Recruit ratings: Rivals: 247Sports: ESPN:				
Tyree Griffin; PG	New Orleans, Louisiana		5 ft 9 in (1.75 m)	165 lb (75 kg)	Mar 21, 2014
Tyree Griffin; PG	Recruit ratings: Rivals: 247Sports: ESPN:				
Jeff Newberry; PG	Hobbs, New Mexico		6 ft 2 in (1.88 m)	180 lb (82 kg)	Sep 22, 2013
Jeff Newberry; PG	Recruit ratings: Rivals: 247Sports: ESPN:				
Mitchell Solomon; PF	Bixby, Oklahoma		6 ft 9 in (2.06 m)	220 lb (100 kg)	Oct 12, 2013
Mitchell Solomon; PF	Recruit ratings: Rivals: 247Sports: ESPN:				
Tavarius Shine; SF	Irving, Texas		6 ft 6 in (1.98 m)	195 lb (88 kg)	May 2, 2014
Tavarius Shine; SF	Recruit ratings: Rivals: 247Sports: ESPN:				
Overall recruit ranking:
Note: In many cases, Scout, Rivals, 247Sports, On3, and ESPN may conflict in their listings of height and weight.; In these cases, the average was taken. ESPN grades are on a 100-point scale.; Sources: "2014 Team Ranking". Rivals.

== Roster ==
2014–15 Oklahoma State Cowboys men's basketball team
Players
Coaches

Pos.	#	Name	Height	Weight	Year	Previous school	Hometown
G	0	Ford Stuen	6 ft 3 in (1.91 m)	190 lb (86 kg)	Jr	Henderson County; IMG Academy (Fla.)	Henderson, KY
G	1	Tyree Griffin	5 ft 10 in (1.78 m)	165 lb (75 kg)	Fr	O. Perry Walker	New Orleans, LA
G/F	2	Le'Bryan Nash	6 ft 7 in (2.01 m)	235 lb (107 kg)	Sr	Lincoln	Dallas, TX
G/F	4	Joe Burton	6 ft 6 in (1.98 m)	205 lb (93 kg)	Fr	Atascocita	Houston, TX
F	5	Tavarius Shine	6 ft 6 in (1.98 m)	195 lb (88 kg)	Fr	MacArthur; FUMA	Irving, TX
G	12	Anthony Hickey	5 ft 11 in (1.8 m)	185 lb (84 kg)	Sr	Christian County; LSU	Hopkinsville, KY
G	13	Phil Forte	5 ft 11 in (1.8 m)	185 lb (84 kg)	Jr	Marcus	Flower Mound, TX
F/C	14	Marek Souček	7 ft 0 in (2.13 m)	240 lb (109 kg)	Sr	Canarias Academy	Brno, Czech Republic
G/F	15	Christien Sager	6 ft 4 in (1.93 m)	205 lb (93 kg)	Sr	Rider	Wichita Falls, TX
F	20	Michael Cobbins	6 ft 8 in (2.03 m)	230 lb (104 kg)	RS Sr	Palo Duro	Amarillo, TX
G	22	Jeff Newberry	6 ft 2 in (1.88 m)	190 lb (86 kg)	RS Jr	Westlake; NMJC	Atlanta, GA
G/F	23	Leyton Hammonds	6 ft 7 in (2.01 m)	205 lb (93 kg)	So	Richland	North Richland Hills, TX
G	24	Alex Budke	6 ft 2 in (1.88 m)	190 lb (86 kg)	Sr	Stillwater	Stillwater, OK
G/F	30	Jeffrey Carroll	6 ft 6 in (1.98 m)	205 lb (93 kg)	RS Fr	Rowlett	Rowlett, TX
C	32	Anthony Allen	7 ft 1 in (2.16 m)	240 lb (109 kg)	RS Jr	Bassick; Lamar State Port Arthur	Kingston, Jamaica
C	41	Mitchell Solomon	6 ft 9 in (2.06 m)	235 lb (107 kg)	Fr	Bixby	Bixby, OK

Head coach

- Travis Ford (Kentucky)

Assistant coach(es)

- Butch Pierre (Mississippi State)
- James Dickey (Central Arkansas)
- Chris Ferguson (Cumberlands)

Legend

- (C) Team captain
- (S) Suspended
- (I) Ineligible
- (W) Walk-on
- Injured
- Current redshirt

== Schedule and results ==
Date time, TV	Rank^{#}	Opponent^{#}	Result	Record	Site (attendance) city, state
Exhibition
11/08/2014*; 2:00 pm		Missouri Western	W 74–35		Gallagher-Iba Arena (2,279); Stillwater, OK
Non-conference regular season
11/14/2014*; 7:00 pm		Southeastern Louisiana	W 83–55	1–0	Gallagher-Iba Arena (6,125); Stillwater, OK
11/16/2014*; 2:00 pm		Prairie View A&M	W 74–52	2–0	Gallagher-Iba Arena (5,407); Stillwater, OK
11/18/2014*; 7:00 pm		Northwestern Oklahoma State	W 91–45	3–0	Gallagher-Iba Arena (5,518); Stillwater, OK
11/21/2014*; 7:00 pm		Milwaukee; MGM Grand Main Event	W 82–68	4–0	Gallagher-Iba Arena (5,909); Stillwater, OK
11/24/2014*; 7:30 pm, ESPN3		vs. Oregon State; MGM Grand Main Event semifinal	W 66–53	5–0	MGM Grand Garden Arena (1,507); Las Vegas, NV
11/26/2014*; 10:30 pm, ESPN2		vs. Tulsa; MGM Grand Main Event final	W 73–58	6–0	MGM Grand Garden Arena (1,712); Las Vegas, NV
12/03/2014*; 7:00 pm		North Texas	W 87–61	7–0	Gallagher-Iba Arena (6,086); Stillwater, OK
12/06/2014*; 11:00 am, ESPNU		at South Carolina; Big 12/SEC Challenge	L 49–75	7–1	Colonial Life Arena (12,007); Columbia, SC
12/13/2014*; 5:00 pm, ESPN2		at Memphis	W 73–55	8–1	FedEx Forum (14,501); Memphis, TN
12/16/2014*; 8:00 pm, ESPNU		Middle Tennessee	W 68–48	9–1	Gallagher-Iba Arena (5,217); Stillwater, OK
12/21/2014*; 1:00 pm, ESPNU		No. 17 Maryland	L 64–73	9–2	Gallagher-Iba Arena (11,104); Stillwater, OK
12/30/2014*; 8:00 pm, ESPN2		at Missouri	W 74–72 ^{OT}	10–2	Sprint Center (11,376); Kansas City, MO
Conference regular season
01/03/2015; 11:00 am, ESPNU		Kansas State	W 61–47	11–2 (1–0)	Gallagher-Iba Arena (11,185); Stillwater, OK
01/06/2015; 8:00 pm, ESPN2		at No. 17 Iowa State	L 61–63	11–3 (1–1)	Hilton Coliseum (14,384); Ames, IA
01/10/2015; 4:00 pm, ESPNU		No. 10 Texas	W 69–58	12–3 (2–1)	Gallagher-Iba Arena (9,592); Stillwater, OK
01/13/2015; 6:00 pm, ESPN2	No. 24	at No. 9 Kansas	L 57–67	12–4 (2–2)	Allen Fieldhouse (16,300); Lawrence, KS
01/17/2015; 6:00 pm, ESPN2	No. 24	at No. 18 Oklahoma; Bedlam Series	L 65–82	12–5 (2–3)	Lloyd Noble Center (12,730); Norman, OK
01/21/2015; 8:00 pm, ESPNU		Texas Tech	W 63–43	13–5 (3–3)	Gallagher-Iba Arena (7,090); Stillwater, OK
01/24/2015; 11:00 am, ESPN2		at Kansas State	L 53–63	13–6 (3–4)	Bramlage Coliseum (12,528); Manhattan, KS
01/27/2015; 8:00 pm, ESPNews		No. 20 Baylor	W 64–53	14–6 (4–4)	Gallagher-Iba Arena (7,364); Stillwater, OK
01/31/2015; 7:00 pm, ESPN2		No. 24 Oklahoma; Bedlam Series	L 56–64	14–7 (4–5)	Gallagher-Iba Arena (13,611); Stillwater, OK
02/04/2015; 7:00 pm, LHN		at No. 25 Texas	W 65–63 ^{OT}	15–7 (5–5)	Frank Erwin Center (11,954); Austin, TX
02/07/2015; 1:00 pm, ESPN		No. 8 Kansas	W 67–62	16–7 (6–5)	Gallagher-Iba Arena (10,399); Stillwater, OK
02/09/2015; 6:00 pm, ESPNU	No. 21	at No. 16 Baylor	W 74–65	17–7 (7–5)	Ferrell Center (6,720); Waco, TX
02/14/2015; 5:00 pm, ESPNU	No. 21	at TCU	L 55–70	17–8 (7–6)	Wilkerson-Greines Activity Center (4,266); Fort Worth, TX
02/18/2015; 8:00 pm, ESPNU	No. 22	No. 14 Iowa State	L 65–70	17–9 (7–7)	Gallagher-Iba Arena (7,612); Stillwater, OK
02/21/2015; 1:00 pm, ESPNews	No. 22	No. 23 West Virginia	L 63–73	17–10 (7–8)	Gallagher-Iba Arena (8,610); Stillwater, OK
02/28/2015; 3:00 pm, ESPNews		at Texas Tech	L 62–63	17–11 (7–9)	United Supermarkets Arena (7,480); Lubbock, TX
03/04/2015; 8:00 pm, ESPNU		TCU	W 82–70	18–11 (8–9)	Gallagher-Iba Arena (5,526); Stillwater, OK
03/07/2015; 11:00 am, ESPNews		at No. 20 West Virginia	L 72–81	18–12 (8–10)	WVU Coliseum (13,714); Morgantown, WV
Big 12 tournament
03/12/2015; 8:00 pm, ESPNU	(6)	vs. (3) No. 15 Oklahoma; Quarterfinals	L 49–64	18–13	Sprint Center (18,972); Kansas City, MO
NCAA tournament
03/20/2015*; 6:50 pm, TBS	(9 W)	vs. (8 W) Oregon; Second round	L 73–79	18–14	CenturyLink Center Omaha (17,534); Omaha, NE
*Non-conference game. ^{#}Rankings from AP Poll. (#) Tournament seedings in parentheses. All times are in Central Time. (#) during NCAA Tournament is seed with Region W=West.

CSN = Cowboy Sports Network. The Cowboy Sports Network is affiliated with Fox Sports Net. Games could air on Fox Sports Oklahoma, Fox Sports Oklahoma Plus, Fox Sports Southwest, Fox Sports Southwest Plus, or Fox College Sports.

== Rankings ==
Ranking movement Legend: ██ Increase in ranking. ██ Decrease in ranking. ██ Not ranked the previous week. RV = Received votes. NR = Not ranked.
Poll	Pre	Wk 2	Wk 3	Wk 4	Wk 5	Wk 6	Wk 7	Wk 8	Wk 9	Wk 10	Wk 11	Wk 12	Wk 13	Wk 14	Wk 15	Wk 16	Wk 17	Wk 18	Wk 19	Final
AP	RV	RV	RV	RV	NR	RV	RV	NR	RV	24	RV	NR	RV	21 т	22	RV	NR	NR	NR	N/A
Coaches	NR	NR	RV	RV	RV	RV	RV	RV	RV	24	RV	NR	NR	24	24	RV	NR	NR	NR	NR

*AP does not release post-tournament rankings
