= 2014–15 TCU Horned Frogs men's basketball team =

American college basketball season

2014–15 TCU Horned Frogs men's basketball

Corpus Christi Coastal Classic Champions
- Conference: Big 12 Conference
- Record: 18–15 (4–14 Big 12)
- Head coach: Trent Johnson (3rd season)
- Assistant coaches: Kwanza Johnson; Brent Scott; Chris Tifft
- Home arena: Wilkerson-Greines Activity Center

2014–15 Big 12 men's basketball standings
	Conf.				Overall
Team	W		L	PCT	W		L	PCT
No. 10 Kansas	13	–	5	.722	27	–	9	.750
No. 9 Iowa State †	12	–	6	.667	25	–	9	.735
No. 13 Oklahoma	12	–	6	.667	24	–	11	.686
No. 16 Baylor	11	–	7	.611	24	–	10	.706
No. 20 West Virginia	11	–	7	.611	25	–	10	.714
Oklahoma State	8	–	10	.444	18	–	14	.563
Texas	8	–	10	.444	20	–	14	.588
Kansas State	8	–	10	.444	15	–	17	.469
TCU	4	–	14	.222	18	–	15	.545
Texas Tech	3	–	15	.167	13	–	19	.406
† 2015 Big 12 Tournament winner Rankings from AP poll

The 2014–15 TCU Horned Frogs basketball team represented Texas Christian University in the 2014–15 NCAA Division I men's basketball season. This was head coach Trent Johnson's third season at TCU. They were members of the Big 12 Conference. Due to construction on Daniel–Meyer Coliseum, which has been the Horned Frogs' home arena since 1961–62, TCU played all of their home games at Fort Worth Independent School District's Wilkerson-Greines Activity Center for the 2014–15 season.

== Previous season ==
The 2013–14 Horned Frogs finished the season 9–22, 0–18 in Big 12 play to finish in last place. They lost in the first round of the Big 12 tournament to Baylor. They are looking to win their first conference game since March 19, 2013, two seasons ago.

== Departures ==
Name	Number	Pos.	Height	Weight	Year	Hometown	Reason
Clyde Smith III	3	G	6'2"	185	Freshman	Houston, TX	Cut from team
Thomas Montigel	20	G	6'2"	195	Senior	Fort Worth, TX	Graduated
Jarvis Ray	22	F	6'6"	195	Senior	New Orleans, LA	Graduated
Aaron Durley	44	C	6'10"	270	RS Freshman	Houston, TX	Retired from basketball due to a knee injury

=== Incoming transfers ===
Name	Number	Pos.	Height	Weight	Year	Hometown	Previous School
Kenrich Williams	34	F	6'7"	180	Sophomore	Waco, TX	Junior college transfer from New Mexico Junior College.

== Recruits ==
College recruiting information
Name	Hometown	School	Height	Weight	Commit date
Chauncey Collins; PG	Oklahoma City, OK	Oklahoma City Storm Homeschool	6 ft 1 in (1.85 m)	180 lb (82 kg)	Oct 19, 2013
Chauncey Collins; PG	Recruit ratings: 247Sports: ESPN:				
Link Kabadyundi; C	Montreal, Quebec, Canada	Alma Academy	7 ft 1 in (2.16 m)	240 lb (110 kg)	N/A
Link Kabadyundi; C	Recruit ratings: 247Sports: ESPN:				
Overall recruit ranking: Scout: Not Ranked Rivals: Not Ranked ESPN: Not Ranked
Note: In many cases, Scout, Rivals, 247Sports, On3, and ESPN may conflict in their listings of height and weight.; In these cases, the average was taken. ESPN grades are on a 100-point scale.; Sources: "TCU 2014 Basketball Commitments". Rivals.; "2014 TCU Basketball Commits". Scout.; "ESPN". ESPN.; "Scout.com Team Recruiting Rankings". Scout.; "2014 Team Ranking". Rivals.

== Roster ==
2014–15 TCU Horned Frogs men's basketball team
Players
Coaches

Pos.	#	Name	Height	Weight	Year	Previous school	Hometown
G	0	Charles Hill Jr.	6 ft 2 in (1.88 m)	185 lb (84 kg)	Jr	Trimble Tech	Fort Worth, TX
G	1	Chauncey Collins	6 ft 0 in (1.83 m)	180 lb (82 kg)	Fr	OKC Storm Home School	Oklahoma City, OK
G	2	Michael Williams	6 ft 2 in (1.88 m)	185 lb (84 kg)	So	Reagan	San Antonio, TX
G	3	Josh Brown (redshirt)	6 ft 6 in (1.98 m)	209 lb (95 kg)	So	Bryan Adams; Texas A&M–Commence	Dallas, TX
F	4	Amric Fields	6 ft 9 in (2.06 m)	220 lb (100 kg)	Sr	Putnam West	Oklahoma City, OK
G	5	Kyan Anderson	5 ft 11 in (1.8 m)	175 lb (79 kg)	Sr	North Crowley	Fort Worth, TX
F	11	Brandon Parrish	6 ft 6 in (1.98 m)	185 lb (84 kg)	So	Seguin	Arlington, TX
G	13	Christian Gore	6 ft 2 in (1.88 m)	175 lb (79 kg)	RS So	Franklin; Brown	El Paso, TX
C	14	Karviar Shephard	6 ft 10 in (2.08 m)	225 lb (102 kg)	So	Prime Prep Academy	Dallas, TX
G	20	Dalton Dry	6 ft 3 in (1.91 m)	185 lb (84 kg)	Fr	Fort Worth Country Day	Fort Worth, TX
G	21	Hudson Price	6 ft 6 in (1.98 m)	200 lb (91 kg)	So	The First Academy	Orlando, FL
C	22	Link Kabadyundi	7 ft 1 in (2.16 m)	240 lb (109 kg)	Fr	Alma Academy	Montreal, QE
F	23	Devonta Abrom	6 ft 8 in (2.03 m)	255 lb (116 kg)	RS Jr	Seagoville; Arkansas	Dallas, TX
G	32	Trey Zeigler	6 ft 5 in (1.96 m)	203 lb (92 kg)	RS Sr	Mount Pleasant; Pittsburgh	Detroit, MI
F	33	Chris Washburn	6 ft 8 in (2.03 m)	240 lb (109 kg)	RS So	South Grand Prairie; UTEP	Grand Prairie, TX
F	34	Kenrich Williams	6 ft 7 in (2.01 m)	195 lb (88 kg)	So	University; New Mexico JC	Waco, TX

Head coach

- Trent Johnson (Boise State)

Assistant coach(es)

- Kwanza Johnson (Tulsa)
- Brent Scott (Rice)
- Chris Tifft (Nevada)

Legend

- (C) Team captain
- (S) Suspended
- (I) Ineligible
- (W) Walk-on
- Injured
- Current redshirt

Roster

== Schedule ==
Date time, TV	Rank^{#}	Opponent^{#}	Result	Record	Site (attendance) city, state
Exhibition
11/07/2014*; 7:00 pm		Tarleton State	W 69–61	0–0	Wilkerson-Greines Activity Center (1,012); Fort Worth, TX
Non-conference games
11/14/2014*; 7:00 pm		Prairie View A&M	W 71–54	1–0	Wilkerson-Greines Activity Center (3,669); Fort Worth, TX
11/17/2014*; 7:00 pm, FSSW+		Washington State	W 81–54	2–0	Wilkerson-Greines Activity Center (3,509); Fort Worth, TX
11/20/2014*; 7:00 pm		New Orleans	W 86–71	3–0	Wilkerson-Greines Activity Center (3,425); Fort Worth, TX
11/24/2014*; 7:00 pm		Mississippi Valley State; Corpus Christi Coastal Classic	W 106–53	4–0	Wilkerson-Greines Activity Center (3,058); Fort Worth, TX
11/26/2014*; 7:00 pm		Radford; Corpus Christi Coastal Classic	W 74–50	5–0	Wilkerson-Greines Activity Center (3,436); Fort Worth, TX
11/28/2014*; 6:00 pm, CBSSN		vs. Bradley; Corpus Christi Coastal Classic semifinals	W 57–49	6–0	American Bank Center (N/A); Corpus Christi, TX
11/29/2014*; 5:30 pm, CBSSN		vs. Mississippi State; Corpus Christi Coastal Classic finals	W 61–52	7–0	American Bank Center (2,867); Corpus Christi, TX
12/04/2014*; 8:00 pm, ESPNU		at Ole Miss; Big 12/SEC Challenge	W 66–54	8–0	Tad Smith Coliseum (6,370); Oxford, MS
12/09/2014*; 7:00 pm		Furman	W 80–69	9–0	Wilkerson-Greines Activity Center (3,548); Fort Worth, TX
12/13/2014*; 7:00 pm		McNeese State	W 68–50	10–0	Wilkerson-Greines Activity Center (3,978); Fort Worth, TX
12/20/2014*; 7:00 pm		UTSA	W 88–57	11–0	Wilkerson-Greines Activity Center (4,089); Fort Worth, TX
12/22/2014*; 7:00 pm		Grambling State	W 80–39	12–0	Wilkerson-Greines Activity Center (3,765); Fort Worth, TX
12/29/2014*; 7:00 pm	No. 25	Tennessee State	W 60–40	13–0	Wilkerson-Greines Activity Center (3,403); Fort Worth, TX
Conference games
01/03/2015; 3:00 pm, FSSW		No. 17 West Virginia	L 67–78	13–1 (0–1)	Wilkerson-Greines Activity Center (4,918); Fort Worth, TX
01/07/2015; 8:00 pm, ESPNews		at Kansas State	L 53–58	13–2 (0–2)	Bramlage Coliseum (12,213); Manhattan, KS
01/10/2015; 3:00 pm, ESPN2		No. 21 Baylor	L 59–66 ^{OT}	13–3 (0–3)	Wilkerson-Greines Activity Center (5,388); Fort Worth, TX
01/17/2015; 3:00 pm, ESPNews		at Texas Tech	W 62–42	14–3 (1–3)	United Supermarkets Arena (9,142); Lubbock, TX
01/19/2015; 6:00 pm, ESPNU		No. 17 Texas	L 48–66	14–4 (1–4)	Wilkerson-Greines Activity Center (5,153); Fort Worth, TX
01/24/2015; 1:00 pm, ESPNU		at No. 18 West Virginia	L 85–86 ^{OT}	14–5 (1–5)	WVU Coliseum (12,756); Morgantown, WV
01/28/2015; 8:00 pm, ESPNU		No. 9 Kansas	L 61–64	14–6 (1–6)	Wilkerson-Greines Activity Center (5,439); Fort Worth, TX
01/31/2015; 1:00 pm, ESPNU		at No. 15 Iowa State	L 66–83	14–7 (1–7)	Hilton Coliseum (14,384); Ames, IA
02/04/2015; 7:30 pm, ESPNews		at No. 19 Baylor	L 57–77	14–8 (1–8)	Ferrell Center (5,405); Waco, TX
02/07/2015; 2:00 pm, ESPNews		No. 21 Oklahoma	L 56–68	14–9 (1–9)	Wilkerson-Greines Activity Center (4,500); Fort Worth, TX
02/11/2015; 7:00 pm, LHN		at Texas	L 43–66	14–10 (1–10)	Frank Erwin Center (8,634); Austin, TX
02/14/2015; 5:00 pm, ESPNU		No. 21 Oklahoma State	W 70–55	15–10 (2–10)	Wilkerson-Greines Activity Center (4,266); Fort Worth, TX
02/18/2015; 7:00 pm, FSSW		Kansas State	W 69–55	16–10 (3–10)	Wilkerson-Greines Activity Center (3,804); Fort Worth, TX
02/21/2015; 3:00 pm, ESPN2		at No. 8 Kansas	L 72–81	16–11 (3–11)	Allen Fieldhouse (16,300); Lawrence, KS
02/25/2015; 7:00 pm, FSSW+		Texas Tech	W 71–54	17–11 (4–11)	Wilkerson-Greines Activity Center (3,912); Fort Worth, TX
02/28/2015; 1:00 pm, ESPNU		at No. 16 Oklahoma	L 60–67	17–12 (4–12)	Lloyd Noble Center (5,091); Norman, OK
03/04/2015; 8:00 pm, ESPNU		at Oklahoma State	L 70–82	17–13 (4–13)	Gallagher-Iba Arena (5,526); Stillwater, OK
03/07/2015; 1:00 pm, ESPNews		No. 17 Iowa State	L 76–89	17–14 (4–14)	Wilkerson-Greines Activity Center (5,076); Fort Worth, TX
Big 12 tournament
03/11/2015; 6:00 pm, ESPNU		vs. Kansas State; First Round	W 67–65	18–14	Sprint Center (N/A); Kansas City, MO
03/12/2015; 2:20 pm, ESPN2		vs. No. 9 Kansas; Quarterfinals	L 59–64	18–15	Sprint Center (N/A); Kansas City, MO
*Non-conference game. ^{#}Rankings from AP Poll / Coaches' Poll. (#) Tournament seedings in parentheses. All times are in Central Time.

== Rankings ==
Ranking movement Legend: ██ Increase in ranking. ██ Decrease in ranking. ██ Not ranked the previous week.
Poll	Pre	Wk 2	Wk 3	Wk 4	Wk 5	Wk 6	Wk 7	Wk 8	Wk 9	Wk 10	Wk 11	Wk 12	Wk 13	Wk 14	Wk 15	Wk 16	Wk 17	Wk 18	Wk 19	Final
AP	NR	NR	NR	RV	RV	RV	25	RV	RV	RV	NR	NR	NR	NR	NR	NR	NR	NR	NR	N/A
Coaches	NR	NR	NR	RV	RV	RV	RV	RV	RV	NR	NR	NR	RV	NR	NR	NR	NR	NR	NR	NR

== See also ==
2014–15 TCU Horned Frogs women's basketball team
