= 2014–15 Texas Tech Red Raiders basketball team =

American college basketball season

2014–15 Texas Tech Red Raiders basketball
- Conference: Big 12
- Record: 13–19 (3–15 Big 12)
- Head coach: Tubby Smith (2nd season)
- Assistant coaches: Joe Esposito (2nd season); Vince Taylor (2nd season); Pooh Williamson (2nd season)
- Home arena: United Supermarkets Arena

2014–15 Big 12 men's basketball standings
	Conf.				Overall
Team	W		L	PCT	W		L	PCT
No. 10 Kansas	13	–	5	.722	27	–	9	.750
No. 9 Iowa State †	12	–	6	.667	25	–	9	.735
No. 13 Oklahoma	12	–	6	.667	24	–	11	.686
No. 16 Baylor	11	–	7	.611	24	–	10	.706
No. 20 West Virginia	11	–	7	.611	25	–	10	.714
Oklahoma State	8	–	10	.444	18	–	14	.563
Texas	8	–	10	.444	20	–	14	.588
Kansas State	8	–	10	.444	15	–	17	.469
TCU	4	–	14	.222	18	–	15	.545
Texas Tech	3	–	15	.167	13	–	19	.406
† 2015 Big 12 Tournament winner Rankings from AP poll

The 2014–15 Texas Tech Red Raiders basketball team represented Texas Tech University in the 2014–15 NCAA Division I men's basketball season. The team was led by head coach Tubby Smith, who brought in a whole new coaching staff with him last season. The Red Raiders played their home games at the United Supermarkets Arena in Lubbock, Texas and were members of the Big 12 Conference.

== Recruits ==
College recruiting
Name	Hometown	School	Height	Weight	Commit date
Keenan Evans; PG	Richardson, Texas	Berkner	6 ft 1 in (1.85 m)	N/A	Oct 15, 2013
Keenan Evans; PG	Recruit ratings: Rivals: 247Sports: ESPN:				
Justin Gray; SF	Tampa, FL	Berkeley Prep	6 ft 4 in (1.93 m)	200 lb (91 kg)	Oct 3, 2013
Justin Gray; SF	Recruit ratings: Rivals: 247Sports: ESPN:				
Justin Jamison; PF	West Plains, MO	Missouri; State-West Plains	6 ft 9 in (2.06 m)	260 lb (120 kg)	Mar 11, 2014
Justin Jamison; PF	Recruit ratings: 247Sports: ESPN:				
Isaiah Manderson; C	Oldsmar, FL	Oldsmar Christian	6 ft 10 in (2.08 m)	250 lb (110 kg)	Aug 15, 2014
Isaiah Manderson; C	Recruit ratings: Rivals: 247Sports: ESPN:				
Norense Odiase; PF	Delray Beach, FL	Elev8 Sports Academy	6 ft 8 in (2.03 m)	240 lb (110 kg)	Mar 14, 2014
Norense Odiase; PF	Recruit ratings: Rivals: 247Sports: ESPN:				
Zach Smith; SF	Plano, TX	Plano East	6 ft 7 in (2.01 m)	205 lb (93 kg)	Oct 5, 2013
Zach Smith; SF	Recruit ratings: Rivals: 247Sports: ESPN:				
Devaugntah Williams; PG	West Plains, MO	Missouri; State-West Plains	6 ft 3 in (1.91 m)	205 lb (93 kg)	Mar 10, 2014
Devaugntah Williams; PG	Recruit ratings: 247Sports: ESPN:				
Overall recruit ranking:
Note: In many cases, Scout, Rivals, 247Sports, On3, and ESPN may conflict in their listings of height and weight.; In these cases, the average was taken. ESPN grades are on a 100-point scale.; Sources: "2014 Team Ranking". Rivals.

== Roster ==
2014–15 Texas Tech Red Raiders men's basketball team
Players
Coaches

Pos.	#	Name	Height	Weight	Year	Previous school	Hometown
G	0	Devaugntah Williams	6 ft 3 in (1.91 m)	200 lb (91 kg)	Jr	Canton; Missouri-West Plains	Canton, OH
C	1	Isaiah Manderson	6 ft 10 in (2.08 m)	235 lb (107 kg)	Fr	Oldsmar Christian School	Bronx, NY
G	2	Stan Mays	6 ft 2 in (1.88 m)	185 lb (84 kg)	So	Episcopal	Baton Rouge, LA
G	3	Randy Onwuasor	6 ft 3 in (1.91 m)	190 lb (86 kg)	So	Inglewood	Inglewood, CA
F	4	Justin Jamison	6 ft 9 in (2.06 m)	260 lb (118 kg)	Jr	Strongsville; Missouri-West Plains	Garfield Heights, OH
F	5	Justin Gray	6 ft 5 in (1.96 m)	185 lb (84 kg)	Fr	Berkeley Prep	Tampa, FL
F	11	Zach Smith	6 ft 8 in (2.03 m)	210 lb (95 kg)	Fr	Plano East	Plano, TX
G	12	Keenan Evans	6 ft 3 in (1.91 m)	175 lb (79 kg)	Fr	Berkner	Richardson, TX
G	13	Luke Adams	5 ft 9 in (1.75 m)	170 lb (77 kg)	Sr	Big Spring	Big Spring, TX
G	14	Robert Turner	6 ft 3 in (1.91 m)	180 lb (82 kg)	Sr	Laney; NMJC	Augusta, GA
F	15	Aaron Ross	6 ft 8 in (2.03 m)	225 lb (102 kg)	RS So	Parkview	North Little Rock, AR
G	20	Toddrick Gotcher	6 ft 4 in (1.93 m)	200 lb (91 kg)	RS Jr	Lakeview	Garland, TX
F	32	Norense Odiase	6 ft 9 in (2.06 m)	265 lb (120 kg)	Fr	North Crowley	Crowley, TX
F	34	Alex Foster	6 ft 8 in (2.03 m)	225 lb (102 kg)	So	Seton Academy	Joliet, IL
F	35	Clark Lammert	6 ft 8 in (2.03 m)	210 lb (95 kg)	Sr	Churchill	San Antonio, TX

Head coach

- Tubby Smith (High Point)

Assistant coach(es)

- Joe Esposito (Marist)
- Vince Taylor (Duke)
- Pooh Williamson (Tulsa)

Legend

- (C) Team captain
- (S) Suspended
- (I) Ineligible
- (W) Walk-on
- Injured
- Current redshirt

== Schedule ==
Date time, TV	Rank^{#}	Opponent^{#}	Result	Record	Site (attendance) city, state
Exhibition
11/03/2014*; 7:00 pm		Southeastern Oklahoma State	W 79–67		United Supermarkets Arena (N/A); Lubbock, TX
11/08/2014*; 7:00 pm		Texas A&M–Commerce	L 69–72 ^{OT}		United Supermarkets Arena (4,841); Lubbock, TX
Non-conference regular season
11/14/2014*; 8:00 pm, FSSW+		Loyola (MD)	W 71–59	1–0	United Supermarkets Arena (6,041); Lubbock, TX
11/18/2014*; 9:30 pm, ESPN2		at LSU; ESPN Tip-Off Marathon	L 64–69 ^{OT}	1–1	Maravich Center (8,010); Baton Rouge, LA
11/22/2014*; 7:00 pm, FSSW+		Missouri State	W 80–68	2–1	United Supermarkets Arena (5,107); Lubbock, TX
11/25/2014*; 7:00 pm, FSSW+		Northwestern State	W 75–64	3–1	United Supermarkets Arena (4,535); Lubbock, TX
11/30/2014*; 1:00 pm, FSSW		Air Force	W 63–62	4–1	United Supermarkets Arena (4,876); Lubbock, TX
12/03/2014*; 8:00 pm, SECN/ESPN3		Auburn	W 46–44	5–1	United Supermarkets Arena (7,040); Lubbock, TX
12/10/2014*; 8:00 pm, FSSW+		Fresno State	W 73–56	6–1	United Supermarkets Arena (5,530); Lubbock, TX
12/14/2014*; 1:00 pm, FSSW		Prairie View A&M	W 79–51	7–1	United Supermarkets Arena (5,122); Lubbock, TX
12/17/2014*; 7:00 pm, FCS Central		South Carolina State; Las Vegas Classic	W 101–39	8–1	United Supermarkets Arena (5,164); Lubbock, TX
12/19/2014*; 7:00 pm, FSSW+		Arkansas–Pine Bluff; Las Vegas Classic	W 72–51	9–1	United Supermarkets Arena (5,091); Lubbock, TX
12/22/2014*; 7:00 pm		vs. Loyola (IL); Las Vegas Classic semifinals	L 44–62	9–2	Orleans Arena (1,270); Las Vegas, NV
12/23/2014*; 8:00 pm, FS1		vs. Houston; Las Vegas Classic 3rd place game	L 69–82	9–3	Orleans Arena (1,125); Las Vegas, NV
12/29/2014*; 7:00 pm, FSSW+		North Texas	W 60–45	10–3	United Supermarkets Arena (6,033); Lubbock, TX
Big 12 regular season
01/03/2015; 1:00 pm, ESPNU		No. 11 Texas	L 61–70	10–4 (0–1)	United Supermarkets Arena (9,936); Lubbock, TX
01/05/2015; 6:00 pm, ESPNU		No. 14 West Virginia	L 67–78	10–5 (0–2)	United Supermarkets Arena (6,073); Lubbock, TX
01/10/2015; 2:00 pm, ESPNU		at Kansas	L 54–86	10–6 (0–3)	Allen Fieldhouse (16,300); Lawrence, KS
01/14/2015; 8:00 pm, ESPNews		at Kansas State	L 51–58	10–7 (0–4)	Bramlage Coliseum (12,264); Manhattan, KS
01/17/2015; 3:00 pm, ESPNews		TCU	L 42–62	10–8 (0–5)	United Supermarkets Arena (9,142); Lubbock, TX
01/21/2015; 8:00 pm, ESPNU		at Oklahoma State	L 43–63	10–9 (0–6)	Gallagher-Iba Arena (7,090); Stillwater, OK
01/24/2015; 3:00 pm, ESPNU		No. 9 Iowa State	W 78–73	11–9 (1–6)	United Supermarkets Arena (9,310); Lubbock, TX
01/28/2015; 6:30 pm, ESPNews		at No. 24 Oklahoma	L 36–81	11–10 (1–7)	Lloyd Noble Center (9,857); Norman, OK
01/31/2015; 11:00 am, ESPNU		at No. 17 West Virginia	L 55–78	11–11 (1–8)	WVU Coliseum (12,192); Morgantown, WV
02/04/2015; 8:00 pm, ESPNU		Kansas State	W 64–47	12–11 (2–8)	United Supermarkets Arena (7,429); Lubbock, TX
02/07/2015; 1:00 pm, ESPNU		at No. 11 Iowa State	L 38–75	12–12 (2–9)	Hilton Coliseum (14,384); Ames, IA
02/10/2015; 8:00 pm, ESPN2		No. 8 Kansas	L 53–71	12–13 (2–10)	United Supermarkets Arena (10,397); Lubbock, TX
02/14/2015; 7:00 pm, LHN		at Texas	L 41–56	12–14 (2–11)	Frank Erwin Center (13,178); Austin, TX
02/17/2015; 6:00 pm, ESPN2		No. 20 Baylor	L 49–54	12–15 (2–12)	United Supermarkets Center (6,572); Lubbock, TX
02/21/2015; 11:00 am, ESPNews		No. 17 Oklahoma	L 75–79 ^{OT}	12–16 (2–13)	United Supermarkets Arena (6,761); Lubbock, TX
02/25/2015; 7:00 pm, FSSW+		at TCU	L 54–71	12–17 (2–14)	Wilkerson-Greines Activity Center (3,912); Fort Worth, TX
02/28/2015; 3:00 pm, ESPNews		Oklahoma State	W 63–62	13–17 (3–14)	United Supermarkets Arena (7,480); Lubbock, TX
03/06/2015; 8:00 pm, ESPN2		at No. 14 Baylor	L 74–77	13–18 (3–15)	Ferrell Center (9,554); Waco, TX
Big 12 tournament
03/11/2015; 8:00 pm, ESPNU		vs. Texas; First Round	L 53–65	13–19	Sprint Center (18,972); Kansas City, MO
*Non-conference game. ^{#}Rankings from AP Poll. (#) Tournament seedings in parentheses. All times are in Central Time.
