= 2014–15 Big 12 Conference men's basketball season =

2014–15 Big 12 Men's Basketball Season
- League: NCAA Division I
- Sport: Basketball
- Teams: 10
- TV partner(s): CBS, ESPN, FSN

Regular Season
- 2015 Big 12 Champions: Kansas
- Runners-up: Iowa State
- Season MVP: Buddy Hield
- Top scorer: Buddy Hield

Tournament
- Champions: Iowa State
- Runners-up: Kansas
- Finals MVP: Georges Niang

Basketball seasons
- ← 2013–14 2015–16 →

2014–15 Big 12 men's basketball standings
	Conf.				Overall
Team	W		L	PCT	W		L	PCT
No. 10 Kansas	13	–	5	.722	27	–	9	.750
No. 9 Iowa State †	12	–	6	.667	25	–	9	.735
No. 13 Oklahoma	12	–	6	.667	24	–	11	.686
No. 16 Baylor	11	–	7	.611	24	–	10	.706
No. 20 West Virginia	11	–	7	.611	25	–	10	.714
Oklahoma State	8	–	10	.444	18	–	14	.563
Texas	8	–	10	.444	20	–	14	.588
Kansas State	8	–	10	.444	15	–	17	.469
TCU	4	–	14	.222	18	–	15	.545
Texas Tech	3	–	15	.167	13	–	19	.406
† 2015 Big 12 Tournament winner Rankings from AP poll

The 2014–15 Big 12 men's basketball season began with practices in October 2014, followed by the start of the regular-season on November 14. Conference play is scheduled to begin on January 6, 2015, and conclude with the 2015 Big 12 men's basketball tournament, beginning March 11, 2015 at the Sprint Center in Kansas City.

== Preseason ==
	Big 12 Coaches
1.	Kansas (6)
2.	Texas (3)
3.	Oklahoma (1)
4.	Kansas State
5.	Iowa State
6.	Baylor
6.	West Virginia
8.	Oklahoma State
9.	TCU
10.	Texas Tech

() first place votes

Pre-Season All-Big 12 Teams

Big 12 Coaches
Georges Niang, F Iowa State
Perry Ellis, F Kansas
Marcus Foster, G Kansas State
Buddy Hield, G Oklahoma
Juwan Staten, G West Virginia

- Player of the Year: Juwan Staten, West Virginia
- Newcomer of the Year: Bryce Dejean-Jones, Iowa State
- Freshman of the Year: Cliff Alexander, Kansas & Myles Turner, Texas
Big 12 recruits at the 2014 McDonald's All-American Boys Game

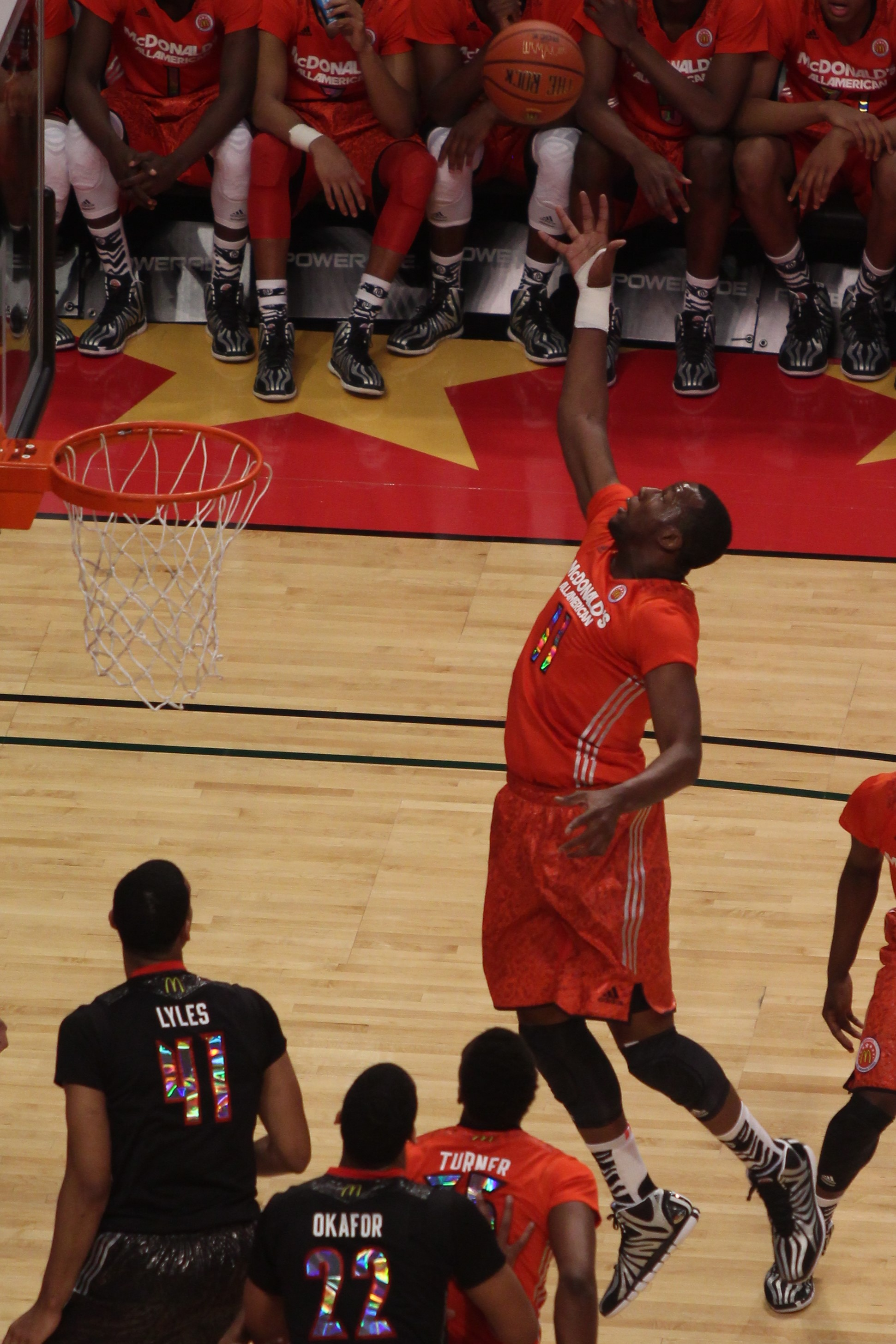
Cliff Alexander, Kansas

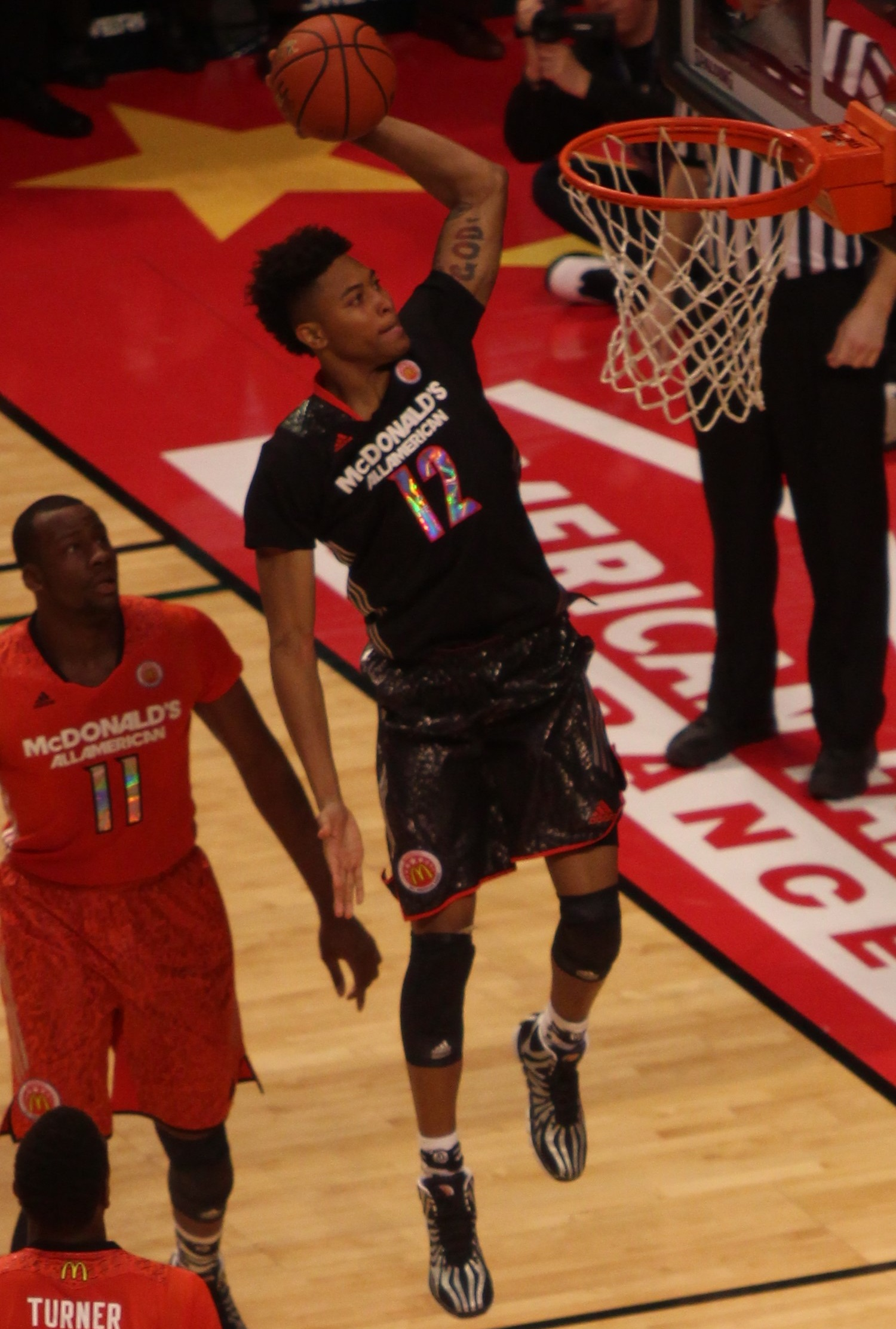
Kelly Oubre, Kansas

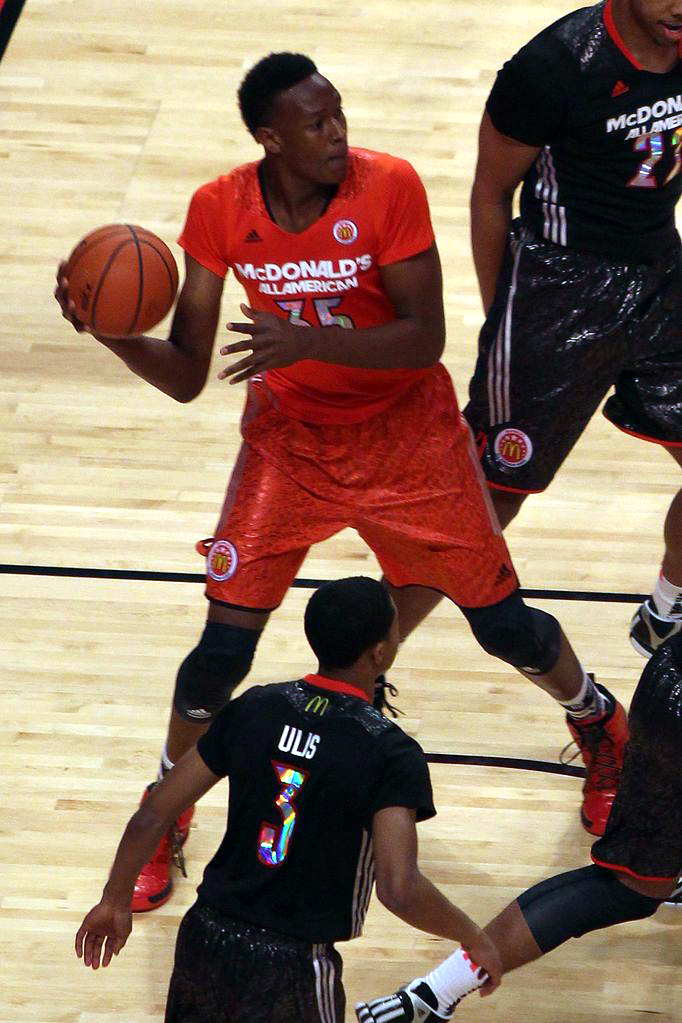
Myles Turner, Texas

== Rankings ==
Legend
Increase in ranking
Decrease in ranking
Not ranked previous week

		Pre	Wk 2	Wk 3	Wk 4	Wk 5	Wk 6	Wk 7	Wk 8	Wk 9	Wk 10	Wk 11	Wk 12	Wk 13	Wk 14	Wk 15	Wk 16	Wk 17	Wk 18	Wk 19	Final
Baylor	AP	RV	RV	RV	RV	RV	RV	22	22	21	22	21	20	19	16	20	19	14	16	16	
Baylor	C	RV	RV	RV	RV	RV	RV	22	22	22	23	21	19	19	16	20	20	16	16	17	21
Iowa State	AP	14	14	13	20	14	13	12	9	17	11	9	15	11	14	14	12	17	13	9	
Iowa State	C	14	14	13	19	13	13	12	9	16	13	12	16	14	14	14	13	17	15	10	19
Kansas	AP	5	5	11	11	10	10	10	13	12	9	11	9	8	8	8	8	9	9	10	
Kansas	C	5	5	12	11	10	10	10	14	13	10	14	11	9	9	8	9	10	10	11	17
Kansas State	AP	RV	RV																		
Kansas State	C	RV	RV	RV								RV	RV					RV			
Oklahoma	AP	19	18	RV	22	16	15	19	18	16	18	19	24	21	17	17	16	15	15	13	
Oklahoma	C	19	18	21	20	15	15	20	21	18	18	20	RV	21	17	17	17	15	14	15	13
Oklahoma State	AP	RV	RV	RV	RV		RV	RV		RV	24	RV		RV	21	22	RV				
Oklahoma State	C			RV	RV	RV	RV	RV	RV	RV	24	RV			24	24	RV				
TCU	AP				RV	RV	RV	25	RV	RV	RV										
TCU	C				RV	RV	RV	RV	RV	RV				RV							
Texas	AP	10	10	7	6	8	9	9	11	10	20	17	19	25	RV	RV	RV				
Texas	C	10	10	9	7	9	9	9	10	10	20	18	20	RV	RV	RV		RV	RV	RV	
Texas Tech	AP																				
Texas Tech	C																				
West Virginia	AP	RV		21	16	22	22	18	17	14	16	18	17	15	21	23	20	20	18	20	
West Virginia	C			24	17	21	20	17	15	14	15	17	17	12	20	22	19	20	18	21	18

== Regular season ==
=== Conference matrix ===
	Baylor	Iowa State	Kansas	Kansas State	Oklahoma	Oklahoma State	TCU	Texas	Texas Tech	West Virginia
vs. Baylor	—	0–2	2–0	1–1	1–1	2–0	0–2	1–1	0–2	0–2
vs. Iowa State	2–0	—	1–1	1–1	1–1	0–2	0–2	0–2	1–1	0–2
vs. Kansas	0–2	1–1	—	1–1	1–1	1–1	0–2	0–2	0–2	1–1
vs. Kansas State	1–1	1–1	1–1	—	0–2	1–1	1–1	2–0	1–1	2–0
vs. Oklahoma	1–1	1–1	1–1	2–0	—	0–2	0–2	0–2	0–2	1–1
vs. Oklahoma State	0–2	2–0	1–1	1–1	2–0	—	1–1	0–2	1–1	2–0
vs. TCU	2–0	2–0	2–0	1–1	2–0	1–1	—	2–0	0–2	2–0
vs. Texas	1–1	2–0	2–0	0–2	2–0	2–0	0–2	—	0–2	1–1
vs. Texas Tech	2–0	1–1	2–0	1–1	2–0	1–1	2–0	2–0	—	2–0
vs. West Virginia	2–0	2–0	1–1	0–2	1–1	0–2	0–2	1–1	0–2	—
Total	11–7	12–6	13–5	8–10	12–6	8–10	4–14	8–10	3–15	11–7

=== Points scored ===
Team	For	Against	Difference
Baylor	1233	1142	91
Iowa State			
Kansas			
Kansas State			
Oklahoma			
Oklahoma State			
TCU			
Texas			
Texas Tech			
West Virginia			

=== Schedules ===
==== Baylor ====
Date time, TV	Rank^{#}	Opponent^{#}	Result	Record	Site (attendance) city, state
Big 12 Regular Season
January 3, 2015; 3:00 pm, ESPNU	No. 22	at No. 18 Oklahoma	L 63–73	11–2 (0–1)	Lloyd Noble Center (12,322); Norman, OK
January 7, 2015; 8:00 pm, ESPNU	No. 21	No. 12 Kansas	L 55–56	11–3 (0–2)	Ferrell Center (7,088); Waco, TX
January 10, 2015; 3:00 pm, ESPN2	No. 21	at TCU	W 66–59 ^{OT}	12–3 (1–2)	Wilkerson-Greines Activity Center (5,388); Fort Worth, TX
January 14, 2015; 8:00 pm, ESPNU	No. 22	No. 11 Iowa State	W 74–73	13–3 (2–2)	Ferrell Center (6,576); Waco, TX
January 17, 2015; 2:00 pm, ESPNU	No. 22	at Kansas State	L 61–63	13–4 (2–3)	Bramlage Coliseum (12,528); Manhattan, KS
January 24, 2015; 5:00 pm, ESPN2	No. 21	No. 19 Oklahoma	W 69–58	15–4 (3–3)	Ferrell Center (8,753); Waco, TX
January 27, 2015; 8:00 pm, ESPNews	No. 20	at Oklahoma State	L 53–64	15–5 (3–4)	Gallagher-Iba Arena (7,364); Stillwater, OK
January 31, 2015; 5:00 pm, ESPN2	No. 20	No. 19 Texas	W 83–60	16–5 (4–4)	Ferrell Center (9,680); Waco, TX
February 4, 2015; 7:30 pm, ESPNews	No. 19	TCU	W 77–57	17–5 (5–4)	Ferrell Center (5,405); Waco, TX
February 7, 2015; 11:00 am, ESPNU	No. 19	at No. 15 West Virginia	W 87–69	18–5 (6–4)	WVU Coliseum (12,783); Morgantown, WV
February 9, 2015; 6:00 pm, ESPNU	No. 16	No. 21 Oklahoma State	L 65–74	18–6 (6–5)	Ferrell Center (6,720); Waco, TX
February 14, 2015; 12:00 pm, CBS	No. 16	at No. 8 Kansas	L 64–74	18–7 (6–6)	Allen Fieldhouse (16,300); Lawrence, KS
February 17, 2015; 6:00 pm, ESPN2	No. 20	at Texas Tech	W 54–49	19–7 (7–6)	United Supermarkets Arena (6,572); Lubbock, TX
February 21, 2015; 12:00 pm, ESPNU	No. 20	Kansas State	W 69–42	20–7 (8–6)	Ferrell Center (8,046); Waco, TX
February 25, 2015; 8:00 pm, ESPNU	No. 19	at No. 12 Iowa State	W 79–70	21–7 (9–6)	Hilton Coliseum (14,384); Ames, IA
February 28, 2015; 3:00 pm, ESPNU	No. 19	No. 20 West Virginia	W 78–66	22–7 (10–6)	Ferrell Center (9,385); Waco, TX
March 2, 2015; 6:00 pm, ESPNU	No. 14	at Texas	L 59–61 ^{OT}	22–8 (10–7)	Frank Erwin Center (12,139); Austin, TX
March 6, 2015; 8:00 pm, ESPN2	No. 14	Texas Tech	W 77–74	23–8 (11–7)	Ferrell Center (9,554); Waco, TX
Big 12 tournament
March 12, 2015; 11:30 am, ESPN2	No. 16	vs. No. 18 (5) West Virginia; Big 12 Tournament quarterfinals	W 80–70	24–8	Sprint Center (18,972); Kansas City, MO
March 13, 2015; 6:00 pm, ESPN2	No. 16	vs. No. 9 (1) Kansas; Big 12 Tournament semifinals	L 52–62	24–9	Sprint Center (18,972); Kansas City, MO
*Non-conference game. ^{#}Rankings from AP Poll. (#) Tournament seedings in parentheses. All times are in Central Time.

==== Iowa State ====
Date time, TV	Rank^{#}	Opponent^{#}	Result	Record	Site (attendance) city, state
Big 12 Regular Season
January 6, 2015; 8:00 pm, ESPN2	No. 17	Oklahoma State	W 63–61	11–2 (1–0)	Hilton Coliseum (14,384); Ames, IA
January 10, 2015; 7:00 pm, ESPN2	No. 17	at No. 14 West Virginia	W 74–72	12–2 (2–0)	WVU Coliseum (12,076); Morgantown, WV
January 14, 2015; 8:00 pm, ESPNU	No. 11	at No. 22 Baylor	L 73–74	12–3 (2–1)	Ferrell Center (6,576); Waco, TX
January 17, 2015; 8:00 pm, ESPN	No. 11	No. 9 Kansas	W 86–81	13–3 (3–1)	Hilton Coliseum (14,384); Ames, IA
January 20, 2015; 6:00 pm, ESPN2	No. 9	Kansas State	W 77–71	14–3 (4–1)	Hilton Coliseum (14,384); Ames, IA
January 24, 2015; 3:00 pm, ESPNU	No. 9	at Texas Tech	L 73–78	14–4 (4–2)	United Spirit Arena (9,310); Lubbock, TX
January 26, 2015; 8:00 pm, ESPN	No. 15	No. 19 Texas	W 89–86	15–4 (5–2)	Hilton Coliseum (14,384); Ames, IA
January 31, 2015; 1:00 pm, ESPNU	No. 15	TCU	W 83–66	16–4 (6–2)	Hilton Coliseum (14,384); Ames, IA
February 2, 2015; 8:00 pm, ESPN	No. 11	at No. 8 Kansas	L 76–89	16–5 (6–3)	Allen Fieldhouse (16,300); Lawrence, KS
February 7, 2015; 1:00 pm, ESPNU	No. 11	Texas Tech	W 75–38	17–5 (7–3)	Hilton Coliseum (14,384); Ames, IA
February 9, 2015; 8:00 pm, ESPN	No. 14	at No. 17 Oklahoma	L 83–94	17–6 (7–4)	Lloyd Noble Center (11,099); Norman, OK
February 14, 2015; 3:00 pm, ESPN2	No. 14	No. 21 West Virginia	W 79–59	18–6 (8–4)	Hilton Coliseum (14,384); Ames, IA
February 18, 2015; 8:00 pm, ESPNU	No. 14	at No. 22 Oklahoma State	W 70–65	19–6 (9–4)	Gallagher-Iba Arena (7,612); Stillwater, OK
February 21, 2015; 1:00 pm, ESPN	No. 14	at Texas	W 85–77	20–6 (10–4)	Frank Erwin Center (13,161); Austin, TX
February 25, 2015; 8:00 pm, ESPNU	No. 12	No. 19 Baylor	L 70–79	20–7 (10–5)	Hilton Coliseum (14,384); Ames, IA
February 28, 2015; 1:00 pm, ESPN2	No. 12	at Kansas State	L 69–70	20–8 (10–6)	Bramlage Coliseum (12,528); Manhattan, KS
March 2, 2015; 8:00 pm, ESPNU	No. 17	No. 15 Oklahoma	W 77–70	21–8 (11–6)	Hilton Coliseum (14,384); Ames, IA
March 7, 2015; 7:30 pm, ESPNews	No. 17	at TCU	W 89–76	22–8 (12–6)	Wilkerson-Greines Activity Center (5,076); Fort Worth, TX
Big 12 tournament
March 12, 2015; 6:00 pm, ESPNU	No. 13	vs. (7) Texas; Big 12 Tournament quarterfinals	W 69–67	23–8	Sprint Center (18,972); Kansas City, MO
March 13, 2015; 8:00 pm, ESPN2	No. 13	vs. No. 15 (3) Oklahoma; Big 12 Tournament semifinals	W 67–65	24–8	Sprint Center (18,972); Kansas City, MO
March 14, 2015; 5:00 pm, ESPN	No. 13	vs. No. 9 (1) Kansas; Big 12 tournament championship	W 70–66	25–8	Sprint Center (18,972); Kansas City, MO
*Non-conference game. ^{#}Rankings from AP Poll. (#) Tournament seedings in parentheses. All times are in Central Time.

==== Kansas ====
Date time, TV	Rank^{#}	Opponent^{#}	Result	Record	Site (attendance) city, state
Big 12 Regular Season
January 7, 2015; 8:00 PM, ESPNU	No. 12	at No. 21 Baylor	W 56–55	12–2 (1–0)	Ferrell Center (7,088); Waco, TX
January 10, 2015; 2:00 PM, ESPNU	No. 12	Texas Tech	W 86–54	13–2 (2–0)	Allen Fieldhouse (16,300); Lawrence, KS
January 13, 2015; 6:00 PM, ESPN2	No. 9	No. 24 Oklahoma State	W 67–57	14–2 (3–0)	Allen Fieldhouse (16,300); Lawrence, KS
January 17, 2015; 8:00 PM, ESPN	No. 9	at No. 11 Iowa State	L 81–86	14–3 (3–1)	Hilton Coliseum (14,384); Ames, IA
January 19, 2015; 8:00 PM, ESPN	No. 11	No. 19 Oklahoma	W 85–78	15–3 (4–1)	Allen Fieldhouse (16,300); Lawrence, KS
January 24, 2015; 1:00 PM, CBS	No. 11	at No. 17 Texas	W 75–62	16–3 (5–1)	Frank Erwin Center (16,540); Austin, TX
January 28, 2015; 8:00 PM, ESPNU	No. 9	at TCU	W 64–61	17–3 (6–1)	Wilkerson-Greines Activity Center (5,439); Fort Worth, TX
January 31, 2015; 1:00 PM, ESPN	No. 9	Kansas State	W 68–57	18–3 (7–1)	Allen Fieldhouse (16,300); Lawrence, KS
February 1, 2015; 8:00 PM, ESPN	No. 8	No. 11 Iowa State	W 89–76	19–3 (8–1)	Allen Fieldhouse (16,300); Lawrence, KS
February 7, 2015; 1:00 PM, ESPN	No. 8	at Oklahoma State	L 62–67	19–4 (8–2)	Gallagher-Iba Arena (10,399); Stillwater, OK
February 10, 2015; 8:00 PM, ESPN2	No. 8	at Texas Tech	W 73–51	20–4 (9–2)	United Spirit Arena (8,397); Lubbock, TX
February 14, 2015; 12:00 PM, CBS	No. 8	No. 16 Baylor	W 74–64	21–4 (10–2)	Allen Fieldhouse (16,300); Lawrence, KS
February 16, 2015; 8:00 PM, ESPN	No. 8	at No. 23 West Virginia	L 61–62	21–5 (10–3)	WVU Coliseum (7,033); Morgantown, WV
February 21, 2015; 3:00 PM, ESPN2	No. 8	TCU	W 81–72	22–5 (11–3)	Allen Fieldhouse (16,300); Lawrence, KS
February 23, 2015; 8:00 PM, ESPN	No. 8	at Kansas State	L 63–70	22–6 (11–4)	Bramlage Coliseum (12,528); Manhattan, KS
February 28, 2015; 5:00 PM, ESPN	No. 8	Texas	W 69–64	23–6 (12–4)	Allen Fieldhouse (16,300); Lawrence, KS
March 3, 2015; 8:00 PM, ESPN2	No. 9	No. 20 West Virginia	W 76–69 ^{OT}	24–6 (13–4)	Allen Fieldhouse (16,300); Lawrence, KS
March 7, 2015; 3:00 PM, ESPN	No. 9	at No. 15 Oklahoma	L 73–75	24–7 (13–5)	Lloyd Noble Center (12,104); Norman, OK
Big 12 tournament
March 12, 2015; 1:30 PM, ESPN2	No. 9	vs. (9) TCU; Big 12 Tournament quarterfinals	W 64–59	25–7	Sprint Center (18,972); Kansas City, MO
March 13, 2015; 6:00 PM, ESPN2	No. 9	vs. No. 16 (4) Baylor; Big 12 Tournament semifinals	W 62–52	26–7	Sprint Center (18,972); Kansas City, MO
March 14, 2015; 5:00 PM, ESPN2	No. 9	vs. No. 13 (2) Iowa State; Big 12 tournament championship	L 66–70	26–8	Sprint Center (18,972); Kansas City, MO
*Non-conference game. ^{#}Rankings from AP Poll. (#) Tournament seedings in parentheses. All times are in Central Time.

==== Kansas State ====
Date time, TV	Rank^{#}	Opponent^{#}	Result	Record	Site (attendance) city, state
Big 12 Regular Season
January 3, 2015; 11:00 am, ESPNU		at Oklahoma State	L 47–61	7–7 (0–1)	Gallagher-Iba Arena (11,185); Stillwater, OK
January 7, 2015; 8:00 pm, ESPNews		TCU	W 58–53	8–7 (1–1)	Bramlage Coliseum (12,213); Manhattan, KS
January 10, 2015; 6:00 pm, ESPNU		at No. 16 Oklahoma	W 66–63 ^{OT}	9–7 (2–1)	Lloyd Noble Center (12,426); Norman, OK
January 14, 2015; 8:00 pm, ESPNews		Texas Tech	W 58–51	10–7 (3–1)	Bramlage Coliseum (12,264); Manhattan, KS
January 17, 2015; 2:00 pm, ESPNU		No. 22 Baylor	W 63–61	11–7 (4–1)	Bramlage Coliseum (12,528); Manhattan, KS
January 20, 2015; 6:00 pm, ESPN2		at No. 9 Iowa State	L 71–77	11–8 (4–2)	Hilton Coliseum (14,384); Ames, IA
January 24, 2015; 11:00 am, ESPN2		Oklahoma State	W 63–53	12–8 (5–2)	Bramlage Coliseum (12,528); Manhattan, KS
January 27, 2015; 6:00 pm, ESPN2		No. 17 West Virginia	L 59–65	12–9 (5–3)	Bramlage Coliseum (12,528); Manhattan, KS
January 31, 2015; 1:00 pm, ESPN		at No. 9 Kansas	L 57–68	12–10 (5–4)	Allen Fieldhouse (16,300); Lawrence, KS
February 4, 2015; 8:00 pm, ESPNU		at Texas Tech	L 47–64	12–11 (5–5)	United Supermarkets Arena (7,429); Lubbock, TX
February 7, 2015; 3:00 pm, ESPN		No. 25 Texas	L 57–61	12–12 (5–6)	Bramlage Coliseum (12,528); Manhattan, KS
February 11, 2015; 6:00 pm, ESPNU		at No. 21 West Virginia	L 72–76	12–13 (5–7)	WVU Coliseum (8,762); Morgantown, WV
February 14, 2015; 7:00 pm, ESPN2		No. 17 Oklahoma	W 59–56	13–13 (6–7)	Bramlage Coliseum (12,528); Manhattan, KS
February 18, 2015; 7:00 pm, FSKC		at TCU	L 55–69	13–14 (6–8)	Wilkerson-Greines Activity Center (3,804); Fort Worth, TX
February 21, 2015; 12:00 pm, ESPNU		at No. 20 Baylor	L 42–69	13–15 (6–9)	Ferrell Center (8,046); Waco, TX
February 23, 2015; 8:00 pm, ESPN		No. 8 Kansas	W 70–63	14–15 (7–9)	Bramlage Coliseum (12,528); Manhattan, KS
February 28, 2015; 1:00 pm, ESPN2		No. 12 Iowa State	W 70–69	15–15 (8–9)	Bramlage Coliseum (12,528); Manhattan, KS
March 7, 2015; 1:00 pm, ESPN		at Texas	L 49–62	15–16 (8–10)	Erwin Center (12,053); Austin, TX
Big 12 tournament
March 11, 2015; 6:00 pm, ESPNU		vs. (9) TCU; Big 12 Tournament 1st Round	L 65–67	15–17	Sprint Center (18,972); Kansas City, MO
*Non-conference game. ^{#}Rankings from AP Poll. (#) Tournament seedings in parentheses. All times are in Central Time.

==== Oklahoma ====
Date time, TV	Rank^{#}	Opponent^{#}	Result	Record	Site (attendance) city, state
Big 12 Regular Season
January 3, 2015; 3:00 pm, ESPNU	No. 18	No. 22 Baylor	W 73–63	10–3 (1–0)	Lloyd Noble Center (12,322); Norman, OK
January 5, 2015; 8:00 pm, ESPN	No. 16	at No. 10 Texas	W 70–49	11–3 (2–0)	Frank Erwin Center (12,625); Austin, TX
January 10, 2015; 6:00 pm, ESPNU	No. 16	Kansas State	L 63–66 ^{OT}	11–4 (2–1)	Lloyd Noble Center (12,426); Norman, OK
January 13, 2015; 6:00 pm, ESPNews	No. 18	at No. 16 West Virginia	L 65–86	11–5 (2–2)	WVU Coliseum (9,196); Morgantown, WV
January 17, 2015; 6:00 pm, ESPN2	No. 18	No. 24 Oklahoma State	W 82–65	12–5 (3–2)	Lloyd Noble Center (12,730); Norman, OK
January 19, 2015; 8:00 pm, ESPN	No. 19	at No. 11 Kansas	L 78–85	12–6 (3–3)	Allen Fieldhouse (16,300); Lawrence, KS
January 24, 2015; 5:00 pm, ESPN2	No. 19	at No. 21 Baylor	L 58–69	12–7 (3–4)	Ferrell Center (8,753); Waco, TX
January 28, 2015; 6:30 pm, ESPNews	No. 24	Texas Tech	W 81–36	13–7 (4–4)	Lloyd Noble Center (9,857); Norman, OK
January 31, 2015; 7:00 pm, ESPN2	No. 24	at Oklahoma State	W 64–56	14–7 (5–4)	Gallagher-Iba Arena (13,611); Stillwater, OK
February 3, 2015; 7:00 pm, ESPN2	No. 21	No. 15 West Virginia	W 71–52	15–7 (6–4)	Lloyd Noble Center (10,154); Norman, OK
February 7, 2015; 2:00 pm, ESPNews	No. 21	at TCU	W 68–56	16–7 (7–4)	Wilkerson-Greines Activity Center (4,500); Fort Worth, TX
February 9, 2015; 8:00 pm, ESPN	No. 17	No. 14 Iowa State	W 94–83	17–7 (8–4)	Lloyd Noble Center (11,099); Norman, OK
February 14, 2015; 7:00 pm, ESPN2	No. 17	at Kansas State	L 56–59	17–8 (8–5)	Bramlage Coliseum (12,528); Manhattan, KS
February 17, 2015; 8:00 pm, ESPN2	No. 17	Texas	W 71–69	18–8 (9–5)	Lloyd Noble Center (11,413); Norman, OK
February 21, 2015; 11:00 am, ESPNews	No. 17	at Texas Tech	W 79–75 ^{OT}	19–8 (10–5)	United Supermarkets Arena (6,761); Lubbock, TX
February 28, 2015; 1:00 pm, ESPNU	No. 16	TCU	W 67–60	20–8 (11–5)	Lloyd Noble Center (5,091); Norman, OK
March 2, 2015; 6:00 pm, ESPNU	No. 15	at No. 17 Iowa State	L 70–77	20–9 (11–6)	Hilton Coliseum (14,384); Ames, IA
March 7, 2015; 3:00 pm, ESPN	No. 15	No. 9 Kansas	W 75–73	21–9 (12–6)	Lloyd Noble Center (12,104); Norman, OK
Big 12 tournament
March 12, 2015; 8:00 pm, ESPNU	No. 15	vs. (6) Oklahoma State; Big 12 Tournament quarterfinals	W 64–49	22–9	Sprint Center (18,972); Kansas City, MO
March 13, 2015; 8:00 pm, ESPN2	No. 15	vs. No. 13 (2) Iowa State; Big 12 Tournament semifinals	L 65–67	22–10	Sprint Center (18,972); Kansas City, MO
*Non-conference game. ^{#}Rankings from AP Poll. (#) Tournament seedings in parentheses. All times are in Central Time.

==== Oklahoma State ====
Date time, TV	Rank^{#}	Opponent^{#}	Result	Record	Site (attendance) city, state
Big 12 Regular Season
January 3, 2015; 11:00 am, ESPNU		Kansas State	W 61–47	11–2 (1–0)	Gallagher-Iba Arena (11,185); Stillwater, OK
January 6, 2015; 8:00 pm, ESPN2		at No. 17 Iowa State	L 61–63	11–3 (1–1)	Hilton Coliseum (14,384); Ames, IA
January 10, 2015; 4:00 pm, ESPNU		No. 10 Texas	W 69–58	12–3 (2–1)	Gallagher-Iba Arena (9,592); Stillwater, OK
January 13, 2015; 6:00 pm, ESPN2	No. 24	at No. 9 Kansas	L 57–67	12–4 (2–2)	Allen Fieldhouse (16,300); Lawrence, KS
January 17, 2015; 3:00 pm, ESPNU	No. 24	at No. 18 Oklahoma	L 65–82	12–5 (2–3)	Lloyd Noble Center (12,730); Norman, OK
January 21, 2015; 8:00 pm, ESPNU		Texas Tech	W 63–43	13–5 (3–3)	Gallagher-Iba Arena (7,090); Stillwater, OK
January 24, 2015; 11:00 am, ESPN2		at Kansas State	L 53–63	13–6 (3–4)	Bramlage Coliseum (12,528); Manhattan, KS
January 27, 2015; 8:00 pm, ESPNews		No. 20 Baylor	W 64–53	14–6 (4–4)	Gallagher-Iba Arena (7,364); Stillwater, OK
January 31, 2015; 7:00 pm, ESPN2		No. 24 Oklahoma	L 56–64	14–7 (4–5)	Gallagher-Iba Arena (13,611); Stillwater, OK
February 4, 2015; 7:00 pm, LHN		at No. 25 Texas	W 65–63 ^{OT}	15–7 (5–5)	Frank Erwin Center (11,954); Austin, TX
February 7, 2015; 1:00 pm, ESPN		No. 8 Kansas	W 67–62	16–7 (6–5)	Gallagher-Iba Arena (10,399); Stillwater, OK
February 9, 2015; 6:00 pm, ESPNU	No. 21	at No. 16 Baylor	W 74–65	17–7 (7–5)	Ferrell Center (6,720); Waco, TX
February 14, 2015; 5:00 pm, ESPNU	No. 21	at TCU	L 55–70	17–8 (7–6)	Wilkerson-Greines Activity Center (4,266); Fort Worth, TX
February 18, 2015; 8:00 pm, ESPNU	No. 22	No. 14 Iowa State	L 65–70	17–9 (7–7)	Gallagher-Iba Arena (7,612); Stillwater, OK
February 21, 2015; 1:00 pm, ESPNews	No. 22	No. 23 West Virginia	L 63–73	17–10 (7–8)	Gallagher-Iba Arena (8,610); Stillwater, OK
February 28, 2015; 3:00 pm, ESPNews		at Texas Tech	L 62–63	17–11 (7–9)	United Supermarkets Arena (7,480); Lubbock, TX
March 4, 2015; 8:00 pm, ESPNU		TCU	W 82–70	18–11 (8–9)	Gallagher-Iba Arena (5,526); Stillwater, OK
March 7, 2015; 11:00 am, ESPNews		at No. 20 West Virginia	L 72–81	18–12 (8–10)	WVU Coliseum (13,714); Morgantown, WV
Big 12 tournament
March 12, 2015; 8:00 pm, ESPNU		vs. No. 15 (3) Oklahoma; Big 12 Tournament quarterfinals	L 49–64	18–13	Sprint Center (18,972); Kansas City, MO
*Non-conference game. ^{#}Rankings from AP Poll. (#) Tournament seedings in parentheses. All times are in Central Time.

==== TCU ====
Date time, TV	Rank^{#}	Opponent^{#}	Result	Record	Site (attendance) city, state
Big 12 Regular Season
January 3, 2015; 3:00 pm, FSSW		No. 17 West Virginia	L 67–78	13–1 (0–1)	Wilkerson-Greines Activity Center (4,918); Fort Worth, TX
January 7, 2015; 8:00 pm, ESPNews		at Kansas State	L 53–58	13–2 (0–2)	Bramlage Coliseum (12,213); Manhattan, KS
January 10, 2015; 3:00 pm, ESPN2		No. 21 Baylor	L 59–66 ^{OT}	13–3 (0–3)	Wilkerson-Greines Activity Center (5,388); Fort Worth, TX
January 17, 2015; 3:00 pm, ESPNews		at Texas Tech	W 62–42	14–3 (1–3)	United Supermarkets Arena (9,142); Lubbock, TX
January 19, 2015; 6:00 pm, ESPNU		No. 17 Texas	L 48–66	14–4 (1–4)	Wilkerson-Greines Activity Center (5,153); Fort Worth, TX
January 24, 2015; 1:00 pm, ESPNU		at No. 18 West Virginia	L 85–86 ^{OT}	14–5 (1–5)	WVU Coliseum (12,756); Morgantown, WV
January 28, 2015; 8:00 pm, ESPNU		No. 9 Kansas	L 61–64	14–6 (1–6)	Wilkerson-Greines Activity Center (5,439); Fort Worth, TX
January 31, 2015; 1:00 pm, ESPNU		at No. 15 Iowa State	L 66–83	14–7 (1–7)	Hilton Coliseum (14,384); Ames, IA
February 4, 2015; 7:30 pm, ESPNews		at No. 19 Baylor	L 57–77	14–8 (1–8)	Ferrell Center (5,405); Waco, TX
February 7, 2015; 2:00 pm, ESPNews		No. 21 Oklahoma	L 56–68	14–9 (1–9)	Wilkerson-Greines Activity Center (4,500); Fort Worth, TX
February 11, 2015; 7:00 pm, LHN		at Texas	L 43–66	14–10 (1–10)	Frank Erwin Center (8,634); Austin, TX
February 14, 2015; 5:00 pm, ESPNU		No. 21 Oklahoma State	W 70–55	15–10 (2–10)	Wilkerson-Greines Activity Center (4,266); Fort Worth, TX
February 18, 2015; 7:00 pm, FSSW		Kansas State	W 69–55	16–10 (3–10)	Wilkerson-Greines Activity Center (3,804); Fort Worth, TX
February 21, 2015; 3:00 pm, ESPN2		at No. 8 Kansas	L 72–81	16–11 (3–11)	Allen Fieldhouse (16,300); Lawrence, KS
February 25, 2015; 7:00 pm, FSSW+		Texas Tech	W 71–54	17–11 (4–11)	Wilkerson-Greines Activity Center (3,912); Fort Worth, TX
February 28, 2015; 1:00 pm, ESPNU		at No. 16 Oklahoma	L 60–67	17–12 (4–12)	Lloyd Noble Center (5,091); Norman, OK
March 4, 2015; 8:00 pm, ESPNU		at Oklahoma State	L 70–82	17–13 (4–13)	Gallagher-Iba Arena (5,526); Stillwater, OK
March 7, 2015; 7:30 pm, ESPNews		No. 17 Iowa State	L 76-89	17–14 (4–14)	Wilkerson-Greines Activity Center (5,076); Fort Worth, TX
Big 12 tournament
March 11, 2015; 6:00 pm, ESPNU		vs. (8) Kansas State; Big 12 Tournament 1st Round	W 67–65	18–14	Sprint Center (18,972); Kansas City, MO
March 12, 2015; 1:30 pm, ESPN2		vs. No. 9 (1) Kansas; Big 12 Tournament quarterfinals	L 59–64	18–15	Sprint Center (18,972); Kansas City, MO
*Non-conference game. ^{#}Rankings from AP Poll. (#) Tournament seedings in parentheses. All times are in Central Time.

==== Texas ====
Date time, TV	Rank^{#}	Opponent^{#}	Result	Record	Site (attendance) city, state
Big 12 Regular Season
January 3, 2015; 1:00 pm, ESPNU	No. 11	at Texas Tech	W 70–61	12–2 (1–0)	United Supermarkets Arena (9,936); Lubbock, TX
January 5, 2015; 8:00 pm, ESPN	No. 10	No. 16 Oklahoma	L 49–70	12–3 (1–1)	Frank Erwin Center (12,625); Austin, TX
January 10, 2015; 4:00 pm, ESPNU	No. 10	at Oklahoma State	L 58–69	12–4 (1–2)	Gallagher-Iba Arena (9,592); Stillwater, OK
January 17, 2015; 5:00 pm, ESPN	No. 20	No. 16 West Virginia	W 77–50	13–4 (2–2)	Frank Erwin Center (13,204); Austin, TX
January 19, 2015; 6:00 pm, ESPNU	No. 17	at TCU	W 66–48	14–4 (3–2)	Wilkerson-Greines Activity Center (5,153); Fort Worth, TX
January 24, 2015; 1:00 pm, CBS	No. 17	No. 11 Kansas	L 62–75	14–5 (3–3)	Frank Erwin Center (16,540); Austin, TX
January 26, 2015; 8:00 pm, ESPN	No. 19	at No. 15 Iowa State	L 86–89	14–6 (3–4)	Hilton Coliseum (14,384); Ames, IA
January 31, 2015; 5:00 pm, ESPN2	No. 19	at No. 20 Baylor	L 60–83	14–7 (3–5)	Ferrell Center (9,680); Waco, TX
February 4, 2015; 7:00 pm, LHN	No. 25	Oklahoma State	L 63–65 ^{OT}	14–8 (3–6)	Frank Erwin Center (11,954); Austin, TX
February 7, 2015; 3:00 pm, ESPN	No. 25	at Kansas State	W 61–57	15–8 (4–6)	Bramlage Coliseum (12,528); Manhattan, KS
February 11, 2015; 7:00 pm, LHN		TCU	W 66–43	16–8 (5–6)	Frank Erwin Center (8,634); Austin, TX
February 14, 2015; 7:00 pm, LHN		Texas Tech	W 56–41	17–8 (6–6)	Frank Erwin Center (13,178); Austin, TX
February 17, 2015; 8:00 pm, ESPN2		at No. 17 Oklahoma	L 69–71	17–9 (6–7)	Lloyd Noble Center (11,413); Norman OK
February 21, 2015; 1:00 pm, ESPN		No. 14 Iowa State	L 77–85	17–10 (6–8)	Frank Erwin Center (13,161); Austin, TX
February 24, 2015; 6:00 pm, ESPN2		at No. 20 West Virginia	L 64–71	17–11 (6–9)	WVU Coliseum (12,048); Morgantown, WV
February 28, 2015; 5:00 pm, ESPN		at No. 8 Kansas	L 64–69	17–12 (6–10)	Allen Fieldhouse (16,300); Lawrence, KS
March 2, 2015; 6:00 pm, ESPNU		No. 14 Baylor	W 61–59 ^{OT}	18–12 (7–10)	Frank Erwin Center (12,139); Austin, TX
March 7, 2015; 1:00 pm, ESPN		Kansas State	W 62–49	19–12 (8–10)	Frank Erwin Center (12,053); Austin, TX
Big 12 tournament
March 11, 2015; 8:00 pm, ESPNU		vs. (10) Texas Tech; Big 12 Tournament 1st Round	W 65–53	20–12	Sprint Center (18,972); Kansas City, MO
March 12, 2015; 6:00 pm, ESPNU		vs. No. 13 (2) Iowa State; Big 12 Tournament quarterfinals	L 67–69	20–13	Sprint Center (18,972); Kansas City, MO
*Non-conference game. ^{#}Rankings from AP Poll. (#) Tournament seedings in parentheses. All times are in Central Time.

==== Texas Tech ====
Date time, TV	Rank^{#}	Opponent^{#}	Result	Record	Site (attendance) city, state
Big 12 Regular Season
January 3, 2015; 1:00 pm, ESPNU		No. 11 Texas	L 61–70	10–4 (0–1)	United Supermarkets Arena (9,936); Lubbock, TX
January 5, 2015; 6:00 pm, ESPNU		No. 14 West Virginia	L 67–78	10–5 (0–2)	United Supermarkets Arena (6,073); Lubbock, TX
January 10, 2015; 2:00 pm, ESPNU		at No. 12 Kansas	L 54–86	10–6 (0–3)	Allen Fieldhouse (16,300); Lawrence, KS
January 14, 2015; 8:00 pm, ESPNews		at Kansas State	L 51–58	10–7 (0–4)	Bramlage Coliseum (12,264); Manhattan, KS
January 17, 2015; 3:00 pm, ESPNews		TCU	L 42–62	10–8 (0–5)	United Supermarkets Arena (9,142); Lubbock, TX
January 21, 2015; 8:00 pm, ESPNU		at Oklahoma State	L 43–63	10–9 (0–6)	Gallagher-Iba Arena (7,090); Stillwater, OK
January 24, 2015; 3:00 pm, ESPNU		No. 9 Iowa State	W 78–73	11–9 (1–6)	United Supermarkets Arena (9,310); Lubbock, TX
January 28, 2015; 6:30 pm, ESPNews		at No. 24 Oklahoma	L 36–81	11–10 (1–7)	Lloyd Noble Center (9,857); Norman, OK
January 31, 2015; 11:00 am, ESPNU		at No. 17 West Virginia	L 58–77	11–11 (1–8)	WVU Coliseum (12,192); Morgantown, WV
February 4, 2015; 8:00 pm, ESPNU		Kansas State	W 64–47	12–11 (2–8)	United Supermarkets Arena (7,429); Lubbock, TX
February 7, 2015; 1:00 pm, ESPNU		at No. 11 Iowa State	L 38–75	12–12 (2–9)	Hilton Coliseum (14,384); Ames, IA
February 10, 2015; 8:00 pm, ESPN2		No. 8 Kansas	L 51–73	12–13 (2–10)	United Supermarkets Arena (8,397); Lubbock, TX
February 14, 2015; 7:00 pm, LHN		at Texas	L 41–56	12–14 (2–11)	Frank Erwin Center (13,178); Austin, TX
February 17, 2015; 6:00 pm, ESPN2		No. 20 Baylor	L 49–54	12–15 (2–12)	United Supermarkets Center (6,572); Lubbock, TX
February 21, 2015; 11:00 am, ESPNews		No. 17 Oklahoma	L 75–79 ^{OT}	12–16 (2–13)	United Supermarkets Arena (6,761); Lubbock, TX
February 25, 2015; 7:00 pm, FSSW+		at TCU	L 54–71	12–17 (2–14)	Wilkerson-Greines Activity Center (3,912); Fort Worth, TX
February 28, 2015; 3:00 pm, ESPNews		Oklahoma State	W 63–62	13–17 (3–14)	United Supermarkets Arena (7,480); Lubbock, TX
March 6, 2015; 8:00 pm, ESPN2		at No. 14 Baylor	L 74–77	13–18 (3–15)	Ferrell Center (9,554); Waco, TX
Big 12 tournament
March 11, 2015; 8:00 pm, ESPNU		vs. (7) Texas; Big 12 Tournament 1st Round	L 53–65	13–19	Sprint Center (18,972); Kansas City, MO
*Non-conference game. ^{#}Rankings from AP Poll. (#) Tournament seedings in parentheses. All times are in Central Time.

==== West Virginia ====
Date time, TV	Rank^{#}	Opponent^{#}	Result	Record	Site (attendance) city, state
Big 12 Regular Season
January 3, 2015; 4:00 pm, RTPT	No. 17	at TCU	W 78–67	13–1 (1–0)	Wilkerson-Greines Activity Center (4,918); Fort Worth, TX
January 5, 2015; 7:00 pm, ESPNU	No. 14	at Texas Tech	W 78–67	14–1 (2–0)	United Supermarkets Arena (6,073); Lubbock, TX
January 10, 2015; 8:00 pm, ESPN2	No. 14	No. 17 Iowa State	L 72–74	14–2 (2–1)	WVU Coliseum (12,076); Morgantown, WV
January 13, 2015; 7:00 pm, ESPNews	No. 16	No. 18 Oklahoma	W 86–65	15–2 (3–1)	WVU Coliseum (9,196); Morgantown, WV
January 17, 2015; 6:00 pm, ESPN	No. 16	at No. 20 Texas	L 50–77	15–3 (3–2)	Frank Erwin Center (13,204); Austin, TX
January 24, 2015; 2:00 pm, ESPNU	No. 18	TCU	W 86–85 ^{OT}	16–3 (4–2)	WVU Coliseum (12,756); Morgantown, WV
January 27, 2015; 7:00 pm, ESPN2	No. 17	at Kansas State	W 65–59	17–3 (5–2)	Bramlage Coliseum (12,528); Manhattan, KS
January 31, 2015; 12:00 pm, ESPNU	No. 17	Texas Tech	W 77–58	18–3 (6–2)	WVU Coliseum (12,192); Morgantown, WV
February 3, 2015; 8:00 pm, ESPN2	No. 15	at No. 21 Oklahoma	L 52–71	18–4 (6–3)	Lloyd Noble Center (10,154); Norman, OK
February 7, 2015; 12:00 pm, ESPNU	No. 15	No. 19 Baylor	L 69–87	18–5 (6–4)	WVU Coliseum (12,783); Morgantown, WV
February 11, 2015; 7:00 pm, ESPNU	No. 21	Kansas State	W 76–72	19–5 (7–4)	WVU Coliseum (8,762); Morgantown, WV
February 14, 2015; 4:00 pm, ESPN	No. 21	at No. 14 Iowa State	L 59–79	19–6 (7–5)	Hilton Coliseum (14,384); Ames, IA
February 16, 2015; 9:00 pm, ESPN	No. 23	No. 8 Kansas	W 62–61	20–6 (8–5)	WVU Coliseum (7,033); Morgantown, WV
February 21, 2015; 2:00 pm, ESPNews	No. 23	at No. 22 Oklahoma State	W 73–63	21–6 (9–5)	Gallagher-Iba Arena (8,610); Stillwater, OK
February 24, 2015; 7:00 pm, ESPN2	No. 20	Texas	W 71–64	22–6 (10–5)	WVU Coliseum (12,048); Morgantown, WV
February 28, 2015; 4:00 pm, ESPNU	No. 20	at No. 19 Baylor	W 78–66	22–7 (10–6)	Ferrell Center (9,385); Waco, TX
March 3, 2015; 9:00 pm, ESPN2	No. 20	at No. 9 Kansas	L 69–76 ^{OT}	22–8 (10–7)	Allen Fieldhouse (16,300); Lawrence, KS
March 7, 2015; 12:00 pm, ESPNews	No. 20	Oklahoma State	W 81–72	23–8 (11–7)	WVU Coliseum (13,714); Morgantown, WV
Big 12 tournament
March 12, 2015; 12:30 pm, ESPN2	No. 18	vs. No. 16 (4) Baylor; Big 12 Tournament quarterfinals	L 70–80	23–9	Sprint Center (18,972); Kansas City, MO
*Non-conference game. ^{#}Rankings from AP Poll. (#) Tournament seedings in parentheses. All times are in Eastern Time..

== Honors and awards ==
=== All-Big 12 awards and teams ===
==== Coaches ====
2015 Big 12 Men's Basketball Individual Awards
Award	Recipient(s)
Player of the Year	Buddy Hield, G., Oklahoma
Coach of the Year	Bob Huggins, West Virginia
Defensive Player of the Year	Jameel McKay, F., Iowa State
Sixth Man Award	Taurean Prince, F., Baylor
Newcomer of the Year	TaShawn Thomas, F., Oklahoma
Freshman of the Year	Myles Turner, F., Texas

2015 Big 12 Men's Basketball All-Conference Teams
First Team	Second Team	Third Team	Defensive Team
Juwan Staten, Sr., G., West Virginia; Buddy Hield, Jr., G., Oklahoma; Georges Niang, Jr., F., Iowa State; Rico Gathers, Jr., F., Baylor; Perry Ellis, Jr., F., Kansas	Kenny Chery, Sr., G., Baylor; Monte Morris, So., G., Iowa State; Frank Mason III, So., G., Kansas; Taurean Prince, Jr., F., Baylor; Le'Bryan Nash, Sr., F., Oklahoma State	Isaiah Taylor, So., G., Texas; Phil Forte, Jr., G., Oklahoma State; Jameel McKay, Jr., F., Iowa State; TaShawn Thomas, Sr., F., Oklahoma; Myles Turner, Fr., F., Texas	Anthony Hickey, Sr., G., Oklahoma State; Jevon Carter, Fr., G., West Virginia; Rico Gathers, Jr., F., Baylor; Jameel McKay, Jr., F., Iowa State; Michael Cobbins, Sr., F., Oklahoma State
† - denotes unanimous selection

== Postseason ==
=== Big 12 tournament ===
- March 11–14, 2015–Big 12 Conference Basketball Tournament, Sprint Center, Kansas City, MO.

2015 Big 12 men's basketball tournament seeds and results
Seed	School	Conf.	Over.	Tiebreaker	First Round March 11	Quarterfinals March 12	Semifinals March 13	Championship March 14
1.	‡† Kansas	13–5	26–8		Bye	#9 TCU	#4 Baylor	#2 Iowa State
2.	† Iowa State	12–6	25–8	5–1 vs OSU, UT, & KSU	Bye	#7 Texas	#3 Oklahoma	#1 Kansas
3.	† Oklahoma	12–6	22–10	4–2 vs OSU, UT, & KSU	Bye	#6 Oklahoma State	#2 Iowa State	
4.	† Baylor	11–7	24–9	2–0 vs WVU	Bye	#5 West Virginia	#1 Kansas	
5.	† West Virginia	11–7	23–9	0–2 vs BU	Bye	#4 Baylor		
6.	† Oklahoma State	8–10	18–13	3–1 vs UT & KSU	Bye	#3 Oklahoma		
7.	Texas	8–10	20–13	2–2 vs OSU & KSU	#10 Texas Tech	#2 Iowa State		
8.	Kansas State	8–10	15–17	1–3 vs OSU & UT	#9 TCU			
9.	TCU	4–14	18–15		#8 Kansas State	#1 Kansas		
10.	Texas Tech	3–15	13–19		#7 Texas			
‡ – Big 12 regular season champions, and tournament No. 1 seed. † – Received a single-bye in the conference tournament. Overall records include all games played in the Big 12 tournament.

==== Bracket ====
First round Wednesday, March 11
8	Kansas State	65
9	TCU	67
7	Texas	65
10	Texas Tech	53

Quarterfinals; Thursday, March 12
1	Kansas	64
9	TCU	59
4	Baylor	80
5	West Virginia	70
3	Oklahoma	64
6	Oklahoma State	49
2	Iowa State	69
7	Texas	67

Semifinals; Friday, March 13
1	Kansas	62
4	Baylor	52
3	Oklahoma	65
2	Iowa State	67

Championship; Saturday, March 14
1	Kansas	66
2	Iowa State	70

* denotes overtime game

=== NCAA tournament ===
Seed	Region	School	Second Round	Third Round	Sweet 16	Elite Eight	Final Four	Championship
2	Midwest	Kansas	#15 New Mexico State - March 20, Omaha - W, 75–56	#7 Wichita State - March 22, Omaha - L, 65–78				
3	West	Baylor	#14 Georgia State - March 19, Jacksonville - L, 56–57					
3	South	Iowa State	#14 UAB - March 19, Louisville - L, 59–60					
3	East	Oklahoma	#14 Albany - March 20, Columbus - W, 69–60	#11 Dayton - March 22, Columbus - W, 72–66	#7 Michigan State - March 27, Syracuse - L, 58–62			
5	Midwest	West Virginia	#12 Buffalo - March 20, Columbus - W, 68–62	#4 Maryland - March 22, Columbus - W, 69–59	#1 Kentucky - March 26, Cleveland - L, 39–78			
9	West	Oklahoma State	#8 Oregon - March 20, Omaha - L, 73–79					
11	Midwest	Texas	#6 Butler - March 19, Pittsburgh - L, 48–56					
	7 Bids	W-L (%):	3–4 .429	2–1 .667	0–2 .000	0–0 .000	0–0 .000	TOTAL: 5–7 .417

== See also ==
- Big 12/SEC Challenge
