= NCAA on CBS =

Collegiate sports telecasts on the CBS Television Network

The NCAA on CBS is the branding used for NCAA college football, college basketball, college baseball, college softball and college lacrosse on CBS and CBS Sports Network.

== College football ==
CBS has been televising college football games since it launched a sports division. CBS currently airs college football coverage from the Navy Midshipmen (since 2005), Mountain West (since 2006), Army Black Knights (since 2009), Mid-American Conference (since 2015), Conference USA (since 2018), Connecticut Huskies (since 2020), Northeast Conference (since 2023), and Big Ten (since 2023). CBS also has the rights to the Sun Bowl (since 1968), and the Army–Navy Game (since 1996). The network is well known for its longstanding coverage of SEC football, which lasted from 1996 through the 2023 season.

CBS also holds the rights to the Conference USA Football Championship Game (airing on CBSSN) and SEC Championship Game (airing on CBS).

While all Big Ten on CBS games air on CBS, only select Mountain West games (especially those involving San Diego State, Boise State, and Air Force), select Army games and select Navy games air on CBS, all other games either air on CBS Sports Network or Facebook.

The Army-Navy game and the Sun Bowl always air on CBS.

== College basketball ==
CBS has been televising college basketball since 1966. CBS currently airs college basketball coverage from the American Athletic Conference (since 2013), Atlantic 10 Conference (since 2013), Big 12 Conference (since 2012), Big East Conference (since 2013), Big Ten Conference (since 1991), Conference USA (since 2018), Colonial Athletic Association (since 2017), Mid-American Conference (since 2015), Missouri Valley Conference (since 2005), Mountain West Conference (since 2006), Pac-12 Conference (since 2012), Patriot League (since 2002), SEC (since 1996), Southern Conference (since 2021), Summit League (since 2023), and West Coast Conference (since 2019). CBS also holds the rights to the CBS Sports Classic (since 2014), and the partial rights to March Madness (since 1982).

The CBS produced American Conference, Big 12, Big Ten, and Pac-12 basketball games all air on CBS, select Missouri Valley Conference, Mountain West Conference and Big East games also air on CBS. All other CBS produced college basketball games air on CBS Sports Network or Facebook.

The Missouri Valley Conference men's basketball tournament championship, Mountain West Conference men's basketball tournament, Atlantic 10 Conference men's basketball tournament championship, and Big Ten Conference men's basketball tournament championship air on CBS. The Conference USA men's basketball tournament championship and Mid-American Conference men's basketball tournament championship air on CBS Sports Network.

CBS shares the rights to the NCAA Division I men's basketball tournament with Turner Sports. CBS airs the Final Four and national championship games every other year.

== College hockey ==
CBS Sports has aired college hockey since 2002. Currently, CBS Sports Network airs college hockey from the National Collegiate Hockey Conference (since 2012).

== College baseball ==
CBS Sports has aired college baseball since 1988. CBS Sports Network currently airs college baseball from the Big East Conference, Patriot League and Conference USA.

== College softball ==
CBS Sports Network currently airs college softball from Conference USA.

== College lacrosse ==
CBS Sports Network currently airs college lacrosse from the Big East Conference and Patriot League.
