= Cincinnati–Memphis rivalry =

Sports rivalry

- Cincinnati Bearcats Memphis Tigers
- Sport: Football, basketball, others
- First meeting: 1966

Locations of Cincinnati and Memphis

The Cincinnati–Memphis rivalry is a college sports rivalry between the University of Cincinnati Bearcats and the University of Memphis Tigers. The rivalry between these two schools dates to their first college football game in 1966, and has continued across all sports, with the men's basketball series gaining attention as well, having started in 1968. The schools have also shared conferences historically, with the rivalry stretching over the span of five conferences from the Missouri Valley Conference, to the Metro Conference, Great Midwest Conference, Conference USA, and more recently in the American Athletic Conference.

== History ==
College Comparison
	Cincinnati	Memphis
Founded	1819	1912
Type	Public	Public
Location	Cincinnati, OH	Memphis, TN
Conference	Big 12	American
Students	44,338	21,521
School colors		
Nickname	Bearcats	Tigers
Stadium	Nippert Stadium	Liberty Bowl
Arena	Fifth Third Arena	FedExForum

Both universities share histories in their founding as small city universities into large universities with prominent Division I athletic programs. The schools would first face off as members of the Missouri Valley Conference in the 1960s and then both schools would be founding members of the Metro Conference, Great Midwest Conference, and Conference USA. The schools were reunited as conference rivals due to conference realignment as members of the American Athletic Conference. While the rivalry was represented annually in football, the true intensity of the rivalry was felt more deeply on the basketball court.

Since the founding of the American, the schools have had many notable contests in various sports. Most recently, with the football teams facing off in the 2019 American Athletic Conference Football Championship Game, with Memphis claiming the victory.

== Football ==
Cincinnati–Memphis football rivalry
- Cincinnati Bearcats Memphis Tigers
- Sport: College football
- First meeting: November 19, 1966; Memphis, 26–14
- Latest meeting: October 31, 2020; Cincinnati, 49–10
- Next meeting: TBA

Statistics
- Total meetings: 37
- All-time series: Memphis leads, 23–14
- Longest win streak: Memphis, 8 (1966–1974)
- Current win streak: Cincinnati, 1 (2020–present)

=== Notable games ===
November 24, 2001: Memphis was searching for their first winning season since 1994 and the story looked complete when the Tigers scored a touchdown with 2:16 left in the fourth quarter. However, Bearcats QB Gino Guidugli led a 75-yard drive, including a 36-yard catch on 4th and 27, that would end with the Bearcats scoring a touchdown with 4 seconds left to win 36–34.

September 24, 2015: In a primetime Thursday night match, Memphis QB Paxton Lynch and Cincinnati QB Hayden Moore led a 99 point shootout. Moore, replacing the injured Gunner Kiel during the first quarter, would set a Cincinnati record throwing for 557 yards. Despite surrendering the most yards in Memphis football history, the Tigers would win the game 53–46.

December 7, 2019: In what would be Mike Norvell's final game at Memphis, the No. 20 Bearcats and No. 17 Tigers clashed for the second consecutive week in the 2019 American Athletic Conference Football Championship Game. Bearcats QB Desmond Ridder returned from injury to start and the teams went blow for blow, with the game having six lead changes. However, the Tigers once again proved to be too much for the Bearcats and would win 29–24 to clinch an appearance in the Cotton Bowl Classic.

=== Game results ===
Rankings are from the AP Poll (1936–present), CFP Poll (2014–present)

Cincinnati victories	Memphis victories	Tie games

No.	Date	Location	Winner	Score
1	November 19, 1966	Memphis, TN	Memphis State	26–14
2	September 30, 1967	Memphis, TN	Memphis State	17–0
3	October 11, 1969	Cincinnati, OH	Memphis State	52–6
4	November 28, 1970	Memphis, TN	Memphis State	14–10
5	October 30, 1971	Cincinnati, OH	Memphis State	45–21
6	November 11, 1972	Memphis, TN	Memphis State	49–24
7	November 24, 1973	Cincinnati, OH	Memphis State	17–13
8	October 12, 1974	Memphis, TN	Memphis State	13–7
9	September 20, 1975	Cincinnati, OH	Cincinnati	13–3
10	November 25, 1978	Memphis, TN	Cincinnati	34–14
11	November 24, 1979	Memphis, TN	Memphis State	23–17
12	November 8, 1980	Cincinnati, OH	Cincinnati	14–10
13	November 7, 1981	Cincinnati, OH	Cincinnati	38–7
14	October 16, 1982	Memphis, TN	Cincinnati	16–7
15	November 12, 1983	Cincinnati, OH	Memphis State	43–10
16	September 22, 1984	Memphis, TN	Memphis State	47–7
17	October 14, 1989	Cincinnati, OH	Memphis State	34–17
18	October 10, 1992	Memphis, TN	Memphis State	34–14
19	October 30, 1993	Cincinnati, OH	Cincinnati	23–20
20	October 22, 1994	Memphis, TN	Memphis	26–3

No.	Date	Location	Winner	Score
21	October 21, 1995	Cincinnati, OH	Cincinnati	28–3
22	October 5, 1996	Memphis, TN	Memphis	18–16
23	October 4, 1997	Cincinnati, OH	Cincinnati	20–17
24	October 17, 1998	Memphis, TN	Memphis	41–23
25	November 20, 1999	Cincinnati, OH	Memphis	21–13
26	November 11, 2000	Memphis, TN	Cincinnati	13–10
27	November 24, 2001	Memphis, TN	Cincinnati	36–34
28	October 26, 2002	Cincinnati, OH	Cincinnati	48–10
29	November 22, 2003	Memphis, TN	Memphis	21–16
30	October 23, 2004	Cincinnati, OH	Cincinnati	49–10
31	October 30, 2013	Memphis, TN	Cincinnati	34–21
32	October 4, 2014	Cincinnati, OH	Memphis	41–14
33	September 24, 2015	Memphis, TN	Memphis	53–46
34	November 18, 2016	Cincinnati, OH	Memphis	34–7
35	November 29, 2019	Memphis, TN	No. 18 Memphis	34–24
36	December 7, 2019†	Memphis, TN	No. 17 Memphis	29–24
37	October 31, 2020	Cincinnati, OH	No. 7 Cincinnati	49–10
Series: Memphis leads 23–14
† 2019 American Athletic Conference Football Championship Game

=== Wins by location ===
Category	Cincinnati	Memphis
Cincinnati, OH	9	8
Memphis, TN	5	15

== Men's Basketball ==
Cincinnati–Memphis basketball rivalry
- Cincinnati Bearcats Memphis Tigers
- Sport: College basketball
- First meeting: January 22, 1968; Cincinnati 75 – Memphis 68
- Latest meeting: February 26, 2023; Memphis 76 – Cincinnati 73

Statistics
- Total meetings: 84
- All-time series: Cincinnati leads, 47–38
- Largest victory: Cincinnati by 34 (December 31, 2017)
- Longest win streak: Memphis, 11 (January 13, 1982 – January 10, 1987)
- Current win streak: Memphis, 3 (February 11, 2021–present)

Men's Basketball Comparison
	Cincinnati	Memphis
First Season	1901	1920
NCAA Championships	2	0
NCAA Final Fours	6	3*
NCAA Tournament Appearances	33	26*
Conference Championships	29	14*
Conference tournament Championships	12	11*
All-Americans	44	38
Consensus 1st Team All-Americans	8	4
Player of the Year	3	0
Conference Player of the Year	10	12

The teams have faced off 84 times in basketball series history, with Cincinnati leading the all-time series 47–36 (and one win vacated by Memphis) as of the 2021–22 season. The teams have played six times in conference tournaments with Cincinnati leading 5–1. Memphis and Cincinnati have faced off once in the NCAA tournament, with Cincinnati leading 1–0.

=== Notable games ===
March 29, 1992: In a rare coincidence, the Tigers and Bearcats faced off for the fourth time during the 1991–92 season, this time in the NCAA Elite Eight. Nick Van Exel and Cincinnati defeated Great Midwest Player of the Year Penny Hardaway in the two regular season matchups and in the tournament final hosted in Chicago. No. 12 Cincinnati would prove to be too much for the Tigers again in Kansas City beating the Tigers 88–57 before falling to the Michigan Fab Five in the Final Four.

February 6, 1993: After four defeats in the prior season, Memphis and Penny Hardaway were ready for blood when the Bearcats visited the Memphis Pyramid. The No. 4 Bearcats were defeated by the Tigers 68–66, recording Memphis their 1,000 program win and what would be Hardaway's only win as a player against Cincinnati.

March 1, 1997: The No. 9 Bearcats were defeated in Memphis 75–63, in what became famously Memphis coach Larry Finch's final game as he was forced to resign by University of Memphis administrators. He would leave as Memphis's winningest coach of all time.

March 3, 2002: Steve Logan and the No. 4 Bearcats came into their senior day game against the Tigers having won or shared each of Conference USA's six regular season titles, but the Tigers battled furiously to top Cincinnati. Cincinnati missed all 16 of their three-point attempts, with senior Logan having to take charge and tie the game with only 6.9 seconds left to send it to overtime. The Bearcats would prevail in the OT period 80–75.

March 1, 2003: The Bearcats entered the game holding a six-game winning streak at the expense of the Tigers. Memphis dominated the second half and led by 23 points from Chris Massie, Memphis won, 67–48, handing Cincinnati its worst defeat in eight years of Conference USA play.

March 6, 2004: No. 20 Memphis visited No. 13 Cincinnati having won 12 of their previous 13 games. In the regular season finale, Bearcat Tony Bobbitt would sink a critical three-pointer to give UC the lead with 36 seconds remaining. Cincinnati would win 83–79.

March 5, 2005: It what would be Bob Huggins final game as against Memphis as Cincinnati's Head Coach, the No. 22 Bearcats won in a game with a bizarre ending. Mistakenly believing the Bearcats to have the lead, James White received the inbound and scored a lazy shot with only a few seconds remaining. That basket would prove to be the difference in beating John Calipari's Tigers 62–60.

January 4, 2014: In the first game of the two teams in the American Athletic Conference, the Bearcats came storming into FedExForum to take on the No. 18 Tigers. Cincinnati would topple Memphis 69–53. Both teams would advance to the 2014 NCAA Division I men's basketball tournament as the rivalry was rekindled in the new conference.

=== Game results ===
Rankings are from the AP Poll (1936–present)

Cincinnati victories	Memphis victories	Tie games	Vacated wins (Note: Memphis has vacated all of its victories from the 2007–08 season. These 38 wins are not included in Memphis's all-time record, nor is the victory against Cincinnati during this season counted in the series record between the two teams.)

No.	Date	Location	Winner	Score
1	January 22, 1968	Mid-South Coliseum	Cincinnati	75–68
2	March 2, 1968	Armory Fieldhouse	Cincinnati	72–63
3	January 25, 1969	Armory Fieldhouse	Cincinnati	62–53
4	February 8, 1969	Mid-South Coliseum	Cincinnati	75–68
5	January 24, 1970	Mid-South Coliseum	Cincinnati	78–69
6	February 7, 1970	Armory Fieldhouse	Cincinnati	77–63
7	January 24, 1976	Mid-South Coliseum	Memphis State	85–79
8	March 6, 1976	Armory Fieldhouse	No. 13 Cincinnati	103–95
9	January 31, 1977	Riverfront Coliseum	No. 12 Cincinnati	88–82
10	March 4, 1977	Mid-South Coliseum	No. 14 Cincinnati	68–67
11	January 14, 1978	Mid-South Coliseum	Memphis State	67–63
12	January 21, 1978	Riverfront Coliseum	Memphis State	83–76
13	January 22, 1979	Mid-South Coliseum	No. 19 Cincinnati	63–61
14	February 10, 1979	Riverfront Coliseum	Cincinnati	87–79
15	January 7, 1980	Riverfront Coliseum	Cincinnati	74–64
16	February 14, 1980	Mid-South Coliseum	Memphis State	61–59
17	January 31, 1981	Riverfront Coliseum	Memphis State	99–85
18	February 7, 1981	Mid-South Coliseum	Cincinnati	65–62
19	January 13, 1982	Mid-South Coliseum	Memphis State	107–75
20	January 23, 1982	Riverfront Coliseum	Memphis State	70–63
21	January 15, 1983	Riverfront Coliseum	No. 1 Memphis State	80–63
22	February 28, 1983	Mid-South Coliseum	No. 14 Memphis State	84–77
23	January 4, 1984	Riverfront Coliseum	No. 19 Memphis State	85–62
24	February 27, 1984	Mid-South Coliseum	No. 12 Memphis State	56–44
25	January 28, 1985	Mid-South Coliseum	No. 4 Memphis State	81–61
26	February 13, 1985	Riverfront Coliseum	No. 5 Memphis State	68–55
27	January 15, 1986	Riverfront Coliseum	No. 6 Memphis State	89–71
28	February 3, 1986	Mid-South Coliseum	No. 2 Memphis State	74–55
29	January 10, 1987	Mid-South Coliseum	Memphis State	83–63
30	February 16, 1987	Riverfront Coliseum	Cincinnati	76–73
31	March 6, 1987^{A}	Freedom Hall	Memphis State	87–58
32	January 25, 1988	Cincinnati Gardens	Memphis State	75–70
33	February 22, 1988	Cincinnati Gardens	Cincinnati	106–90
34	January 7, 1989	Cincinnati Gardens	Cincinnati	89–79
35	February 15, 1989	Mid-South Coliseum	Memphis State	81–71
36	February 3, 1990	Mid-South Coliseum	Memphis State	82–64
37	February 15, 1990	Shoemaker Center	Cincinnati	82–76
38	February 2, 1991	Shoemaker Center	Cincinnati	73–59
39	February 14, 1991	Mid-South Coliseum	Memphis State	70–63
40	January 18, 1992	Shoemaker Center	Cincinnati	75–66
41	March 7, 1992	Memphis Pyramid	No. 14 Cincinnati	69–59
42	March 14, 1992^{B}	Chicago Stadium	No. 12 Cincinnati	75–63
43	March 29, 1992^{C}	Kemper Arena	No. 12 Cincinnati	88–57
44	February 6, 1993	Memphis Pyramid	Memphis State	68–66

No.	Date	Location	Winner	Score
45	March 6, 1993	Shoemaker Center	No. 12 Cincinnati	78–55
46	March 13, 1993^{D}	Memphis Pyramid	No. 11 Cincinnati	77–72
47	January 23, 1994	Memphis Pyramid	Memphis State	62–55
48	February 3, 1994	Shoemaker Center	No. 25 Cincinnati	69–64
49	March 12, 1994^{E}	Shoemaker Center	No. 25 Cincinnati	68–47
50	February 3, 1995	Memphis Pyramid	Memphis	74–69
51	March 2, 1995	Shoemaker Center	Memphis	83–73
52	March 10, 1995^{F}	Bradley Center	Cincinnati	77–64
53	February 29, 1996	Shoemaker Center	No. 7 Cincinnati	71–66
54	March 1, 1997	Memphis Pyramid	Memphis	75–63
55	January 8, 1998	Shoemaker Center	Cincinnati	61–54
56	February 27, 1999	Memphis Pyramid	No. 9 Cincinnati	89–64
57	January 19, 2000	Shoemaker Center	No. 1 Cincinnati	75–55
58	February 15, 2001	Memphis Pyramid	Cincinnati	66–65
59	March 9, 2001	Shoemaker Center	Cincinnati	89–79
60	March 3, 2002	Shoemaker Center	No. 4 Cincinnati	80–75^{OT}
61	March 1, 2003	Memphis Pyramid	No. 24 Memphis	67–48
62	March 6, 2004	Shoemaker Center	No. 13 Cincinnati	83–79
63	March 5, 2005	FedExForum	No. 22 Cincinnati	62–60
64	December 3, 2005	Fifth Third Arena	No. 9 Memphis	91–81
65	January 4, 2007	FedExForum	No. 22 Memphis	88–55
66	December 19, 2007	Fifth Third Arena	No. 2 Memphis^{†}	79–69
67	December 29, 2008	FedExForum	Memphis	60–45
68	January 4, 2014	FedExForum	Cincinnati	69–53
69	March 6, 2014	Fifth Third Arena	No. 15 Cincinnati	97–84
70	January 15, 2015	FedExForum	Memphis	63–50
71	March 8, 2015	Fifth Third Arena	Cincinnati	77–65
72	January 21, 2016	Fifth Third Arena	Cincinnati	76–72
73	February 6, 2016	FedExForum	Memphis	63–59
74	February 23, 2017	Fifth Third Arena	No. 15 Cincinnati	87–74
75	December 31, 2017	BB&T Arena	No. 21 Cincinnati	82–48
76	January 27, 2018	FedExForum	No. 9 Cincinnati	62–48
77	March 10, 2018^{G}	Amway Center	No. 8 Cincinnati	70–60
78	February 7, 2019	FedExForum	No. 25 Cincinnati	69–64
79	March 2, 2019	Fifth Third Arena	No. 23 Cincinnati	71–69
80	January 17, 2020	FedExForum	No. 22 Memphis	60–49
81	February 13, 2020	Fifth Third Arena	Cincinnati	92–86^{OT}
82	February 28, 2021	Fifth Third Arena	Memphis	80–74
83	January 9, 2022	FedExForum	Memphis	87–80
84	February 16, 2022	Fifth Third Arena	Memphis	81–74
85	January 22, 2023	Fifth Third Arena	Memphis	75–68
86	February 26, 2023	FedExForum	Memphis	76–73
Series: Cincinnati leads 47–38
† Vacated by Memphis

==== Notes ====
^{A} 1987 Metro Conference men's basketball tournament
^{B} 1992 Great Midwest Conference men's basketball tournament
^{C} 1992 NCAA Elite Eight
^{D} 1993 Great Midwest Conference men's basketball tournament
^{E} 1994 Great Midwest Conference men's basketball tournament
^{F} 1995 Great Midwest Conference men's basketball tournament
^{G} 2018 American Athletic Conference men's basketball tournament

=== Wins by location ===
Category	Cincinnati	Memphis
Cincinnati, OH	28	13
Chicago, IL	1	0
Highland Heights, KY	1	0
Kansas City, MO	1	0
Louisville, KY	0	1
Memphis, TN	14	23
Milwaukee, WI	1	0
Orlando, FL	1	0

=== Wins by venue ===
Category	Cincinnati	Memphis
Amway Center	1	0
Armory Fieldhouse	4	0
BB&T Arena	1	0
Bradley Center	1	0
Chicago Stadium	1	0
Cincinnati Gardens	2	1
FedExForum	4	6
Shoemaker Center; Fifth Third Arena	18	5
Freedom Hall	0	1
Kemper Arena	1	0
Riverfront Coliseum	4	7
Memphis Pyramid	4	5
Mid-South Coliseum	6	12

== Women's basketball ==
First playing in the 1977–78 season, Memphis now leads the all-time series 36–24 as of the end of the 2020–21 season.

== Baseball ==
The baseball teams have met a total of 137 times since 1962, with Memphis leading the series 67–50 as of the end of the 2021 season.
