= 1994–95 Cincinnati Bearcats men's basketball team =

American college basketball season

1994–95 Cincinnati Bearcats men's basketball

GMWC tournament champions

NCAA tournament, Second round
- Conference: Great Midwest Conference
- Record: 22–12 (7–5 GMWC)
- Head coach: Bob Huggins (6th season)
- Assistant coaches: Larry Harrison (6th season); Steve Moeller; John Loyer (6th season)
- Home arena: Myrl Shoemaker Center

1994–95 Great Midwest Conference men's basketball standings
| | Conf. | | | | Overall |
| Team | W | | L | PCT | W | | L | PCT |
|---|---|---|---|---|---|---|---|---|
| Memphis | 9 | – | 3 | .750 | 24 | – | 10 | .706 |
| Saint Louis | 8 | – | 4 | .667 | 23 | – | 8 | .742 |
| Marquette | 7 | – | 5 | .583 | 21 | – | 12 | .636 |
| Cincinnati † | 7 | – | 5 | .583 | 22 | – | 12 | .647 |
| DePaul | 6 | – | 6 | .500 | 17 | – | 11 | .607 |
| UAB | 5 | – | 7 | .417 | 14 | – | 16 | .467 |
| Dayton | 0 | – | 12 | .000 | 7 | – | 20 | .259 |
† 1995 GMC tournament winner Rankings from AP poll

The 1994–95 Cincinnati Bearcats men's basketball team represented the University of Cincinnati in NCAA Division I competition during the 1994–95 season. The Bearcats, coached by Bob Huggins, won the Great Midwest Conference tournament for the fourth straight season and reached the second round of the 1995 NCAA tournament. The team finished with an overall record of 22–12 (7–5 GMWC).

== Roster ==
1994–95 Cincinnati Bearcats men's basketball team
Players
Coaches

| Pos. | # | Name | Height | Weight | Year | Hometown |
|---|---|---|---|---|---|---|
| F | 34 | Bobby Brannen | 6 ft 7 in (2.01 m) | — | Fr | Cincinnati |
| G | 33 | Darnell Burton | 6 ft 2 in (1.88 m) | — | So | Lexington, Kentucky |
| G | 23 | LaZelle Durden | 6 ft 2 in (1.88 m) | 175 lb (79 kg) | Sr | Rossford, Ohio |
| G | 3 | Damon Flint | 6 ft 5 in (1.96 m) | — | So | Cincinnati |
| PF | 25 | Danny Fortson | 6 ft 7 in (2.01 m) | 250 lb (113 kg) | Fr | Pittsburgh, Pennsylvania |
| F | 21 | Keith Gregor | 6 ft 5 in (1.96 m) | 205 lb (93 kg) | Jr | Cincinnati, Ohio |
| G | | Keith LeGree | 6 ft 1 in (1.85 m) | — | Jr |
| C | 00 | Art Long | 6 ft 9 in (2.06 m) | 245 lb (111 kg) | Jr | Rochester, New York |

Head coach

- Bob Huggins (West Virginia)

Assistant coach(es)

- Larry Harrison (Pittsburgh)
- Steve Moeller (Otterbein)
- John Loyer (Akron)

Legend

- (C) Team captain
- (S) Suspended
- (I) Ineligible
- (W) Walk-on
- Injured
- Current redshirt

== Schedule ==
| Date time, TV | Rank^{#} | Opponent^{#} | Result | Record | Site city, state |
Non-conference regular season
| Nov 26, 1994* | No. 12 | Austin Peay | W 108–73 | 1–0 | Myrl H. Shoemaker Center; Cincinnati, Ohio |
| Nov 28, 1994* | No. 10 | at Rutgers | W 72–61 | 2–0 | Louis Brown Athletic Center; Piscataway, New Jersey |
| Dec 2, 1994* | No. 10 | vs. Temple | W 60–41 | 3–0 | Bojangles Coliseum; Charlotte, North Carolina |
| Dec 3, 1994* | No. 10 | vs. No. 2 North Carolina | L 76–86 | 3–1 | Bojangles Coliseum; Charlotte, North Carolina |
| Dec 9, 1994* | No. 13 | Canisius | L 69–72 | 3–2 | Myrl H. Shoemaker Center; Cincinnati, Ohio |
| Dec 10, 1994* | No. 13 | Tennessee-Martin | W 110–56 | 4–2 | Myrl H. Shoemaker Center; Cincinnati, Ohio |
| Dec 13, 1994* | No. 17 | at No. 11 Minnesota | W 91–88 ^{OT} | 5–2 | Williams Arena; Minneapolis, Minnesota |
| Dec 17, 1994* | No. 17 | at Wyoming | W 81–80 | 6–2 | Arena-Auditorium; Laramie, Wyoming |
| Dec 19, 1994* | No. 13 | Cal State Northridge | W 116–54 | 7–2 | Myrl H. Shoemaker Center; Cincinnati, Ohio |
| Dec 21, 1994* | No. 13 | No. 24 California | L 76–89 | 7–3 | Myrl H. Shoemaker Center; Cincinnati, Ohio |
| Dec 28, 1994* | No. 20 | vs. No. 17 Georgia Tech; Rainbow Classic | W 69–66 | 8–3 | Stan Sheriff Center; Honolulu, Hawaii |
| Dec 29, 1994* | No. 20 | vs. No. 3 Arkansas; Rainbow Classic | L 75–84 | 8–4 | Stan Sheriff Center; Honolulu, Hawaii |
| Dec 30, 1994* | No. 20 | at Hawaii; Rainbow Classic | L 66–75 | 8–5 | Stan Sheriff Center; Honolulu, Hawaii |
GMWC regular season
| Jan 6, 1995 | | at DePaul | W 67–64 | 9–5 (1–0) | Rosemont Horizon; Rosemont, Illinois |
| Jan 9, 1995* | | at Xavier | W 87–80 | 10–5 | Cincinnati Gardens; Cincinnati, Ohio |
| Jan 12, 1995 | | at Marquette | W 91–64 | 11–5 (2–0) | Bradley Center; Milwaukee, Wisconsin |
| Jan 14, 1995* | | Tulane | W 86–72 | 12–5 | Myrl H. Shoemaker Center; Cincinnati, Ohio |
| Jan 19, 1995 | No. 23 | Saint Louis | W 84–73 | 13–5 (3–0) | Myrl H. Shoemaker Center; Cincinnati, Ohio |
| Jan 21, 1995 | No. 23 | DePaul | W 92–82 | 14–5 (4–0) | Myrl H. Shoemaker Center; Cincinnati, Ohio |
| Jan 26, 1995 | No. 19 | at Dayton | W 81–60 | 15–5 (5–0) | University of Dayton Arena; Dayton, Ohio |
| Jan 28, 1995 | No. 19 | at Saint Louis | L 68–75 | 15–6 (5–1) | Kiel Center; St. Louis, Missouri |
| Feb 3, 1995 | No. 23 | at Memphis | L 69–74 ^{OT} | 15–7 (5–2) | The Pyramid; Memphis, Tennessee |
| Feb 5, 1995 | No. 23 | Marquette | L 52–59 | 15–8 (5–3) | Myrl H. Shoemaker Center; Cincinnati, Ohio |
| Feb 12, 1995 | | Dayton | W 116–63 | 16–8 (6–3) | Myrl H. Shoemaker Center; Cincinnati, Ohio |
| Feb 16, 1995* | | Morehead State | W 91–59 | 17–8 | Myrl H. Shoemaker Center; Cincinnati, Ohio |
| Feb 19, 1995* | | vs. No. 7 Maryland | L 72–74 | 17–9 | Alamodome; San Antonio, Texas |
| Feb 26, 1995 | | at UAB | L 63–64 | 17–10 (6–4) | UAB Arena; Birmingham, Alabama |
| Mar 2, 1995 | | Memphis | L 73–83 | 17–11 (6–5) | Myrl H. Shoemaker Center; Cincinnati, Ohio |
| Mar 4, 1995 | | UAB | W 85–61 | 18–11 (7–5) | Myrl H. Shoemaker Center; Cincinnati, Ohio |
GMWC Tournament
| Mar 9, 1995* | | vs. DePaul; Quarterfinals | W 96–95 ^{OT} | 19–11 | Bradley Center; Milwaukee, Wisconsin |
| Mar 10, 1995* | | vs. Memphis; Semifinals | W 77–64 | 20–11 | Bradley Center; Milwaukee, Wisconsin |
| Mar 11, 1995* | | vs. Saint Louis; Championship game | W 67–65 | 21–11 | Bradley Center; Milwaukee, Wisconsin |
NCAA Tournament
| Mar 16, 1995*; CBS | (7 W) | vs. (10 W) Temple; First round | W 77–71 | 22–11 | Jon M. Huntsman Center; Salt Lake City, Utah |
| Mar 18, 1995*; CBS | (7 W) | vs. (2 W) No. 8 Connecticut; Second round | L 91–96 | 22–12 | Jon M. Huntsman Center (13,521); Salt Lake City, Utah |
*Non-conference game. ^{#}Rankings from AP poll. (#) Tournament seedings in parentheses. W=West.
