= 1994–95 Memphis Tigers men's basketball team =

American college basketball season

1994–95 Memphis Tigers men's basketball

Great Midwest Conference regular season champion

NCAA tournament, Sweet Sixteen
- Conference: Great Midwest Conference

Ranking
- Coaches: No. 14
- Record: 24–10 (9–3 Great Midwest)
- Head coach: Larry Finch (9th season)
- Home arena: Pyramid Arena

1994–95 Great Midwest Conference men's basketball standings
	Conf.				Overall
Team	W		L	PCT	W		L	PCT
Memphis	9	–	3	.750	24	–	10	.706
Saint Louis	8	–	4	.667	23	–	8	.742
Marquette	7	–	5	.583	21	–	12	.636
Cincinnati †	7	–	5	.583	22	–	12	.647
DePaul	6	–	6	.500	17	–	11	.607
UAB	5	–	7	.417	14	–	16	.467
Dayton	0	–	12	.000	7	–	20	.259
† 1995 GMC tournament winner Rankings from AP poll

The 1994–95 Memphis Tigers men's basketball team represented Memphis State University as a member of the Great Midwest Conference during the 1994–95 NCAA Division I men's basketball season. The Tigers were led by head coach Larry Finch and played their home games at the Pyramid Arena in Memphis, Tennessee.

The Tigers won the regular season conference title and received an at-large bid to the 1995 NCAA tournament as No. 6 seed in the Midwest region. After defeating No. 11 seed Louisville and No. 3 seed Purdue, Memphis State fell to No. 2 seed Arkansas in the Midwest Regional semifinal. The team finished with a 24–10 record (9–3 Great Midwest).

== Roster ==
1994–95 Memphis State Tigers men's basketball team
Players
Coaches

Pos.	#	Name	Height	Weight	Year	Previous school	Hometown
G	00	Chris Garner	5 ft 10 in (1.78 m)	155 lb (70 kg)	So	Treadwell	Memphis, Tennessee
G	12	Leon Mitchell	6 ft 3 in (1.91 m)	175 lb (79 kg)	Sr	Overton	Memphis, Tennessee
G	15	Marcus Nolan	6 ft 2 in (1.88 m)	171 lb (78 kg)	Sr	Hamilton	Memphis, Tennessee
F	50	David Vaughn	6 ft 9 in (2.06 m)	232 lb (105 kg)	Jr	Whites Creek	Whites Creek, Tennessee
C	55	Lorenzen Wright	6 ft 11 in (2.11 m)	245 lb (111 kg)	Fr	Booker T. Washington	Memphis, Tennessee

Head coach

- Larry Finch (Memphis)

Assistant coach(es)

Legend

- (C) Team captain
- (S) Suspended
- (I) Ineligible
- (W) Walk-on
- Injured
- Current redshirt

Roster
Last update: May 16, 2020

== Schedule and results ==
Date time, TV	Rank^{#}	Opponent^{#}	Result	Record	Site city, state
Regular season
Nov 16, 1994*		Southwestern Louisiana	W 70–66	1–0	Pyramid Arena; Memphis, Tennessee
Nov 17, 1994*		San Francisco	W 94–82	2–0	Pyramid Arena; Memphis, Tennessee
Nov 18, 1994*		vs. New Mexico State	L 78–81	2–1	Madison Square Garden; New York, New York
Nov 19, 1994*		vs. George Washington	L 60–69	2–2	Madison Square Garden; New York, New York
Dec 3, 1994*		Jackson State	W 94–59	3–2	Pyramid Arena; Memphis, Tennessee
Dec 7, 1994*		Georgia State	W 124–52	4–2	Pyramid Arena; Memphis, Tennessee
Dec 10, 1994*		vs. No. 18 Georgetown	L 80–83 ^{OT}	4–3	Maple Leaf Gardens; Toronto, Ontario
Dec 17, 1994*		at Tennessee	W 50–46	5–3	Thompson-Boling Arena; Knoxville, Tennessee
Dec 19, 1994*		Florida A&M	W 119–54	6–3	Pyramid Arena; Memphis, Tennessee
Dec 21, 1994*		Nicholls State	W 92–72	7–3	Pyramid Arena; Memphis, Tennessee
Dec 23, 1994*		Northeast Louisiana	W 100–79	8–3	Pyramid Arena; Memphis, Tennessee
Dec 29, 1994*		at Illinois	L 76–86	8–4	Assembly Hall; Champaign, Illinois
Jan 3, 1995*		Houston	W 96–77	9–4	Pyramid Arena; Memphis, Tennessee
Jan 5, 1995*		Chattanooga	W 82–76	10–4	Pyramid Arena; Memphis, Tennessee
Jan 8, 1995*		at DePaul	W 77–69	11–4	Allstate Arena; Rosemont, Illinois
Jan 14, 1995*		DePaul	W 76–64	12–4	Pyramid Arena; Memphis, Tennessee
Jan 17, 1995*		Southern Miss	W 81–71	13–4	Pyramid Arena; Memphis, Tennessee
Jan 21, 1995*		at UAB	L 63–80	13–5	Bartow Arena; Birmingham, Alabama
Jan 25, 1995*		Saint Louis	W 84–80	14–5	Pyramid Arena; Memphis, Tennessee
Jan 28, 1995*		UAB	W 74–67	15–5	Pyramid Arena; Memphis, Tennessee
Feb 3, 1995*		No. 23 Cincinnati	W 74–69 ^{OT}	16–5	Pyramid Arena; Memphis, Tennessee
Feb 5, 1995*		at Temple	W 53–51	17–5	McGonigle Hall; Philadelphia, Pennsylvania
Feb 9, 1995*		at No. 12 Arkansas	L 87–88	17–6	Bud Walton Arena; Fayetteville, Arkansas
Feb 11, 1995*		at Saint Louis	L 52–68	17–7	Kiel Center; St. Louis, Missouri
Feb 16, 1995*		at Dayton	W 68–61	18–7	University of Dayton Arena; Dayton, Ohio
Feb 18, 1995*		Marquette	W 77–71	19–7	Pyramid Arena; Memphis, Tennessee
Feb 20, 1995*		Long Beach State	W 82–73	20–7	Pyramid Arena; Memphis, Tennessee
Feb 28, 1995*		Dayton	W 87–60	21–7	Pyramid Arena; Memphis, Tennessee
Mar 2, 1995*		at Cincinnati	W 83–73	22–7	Fifth Third Arena; Cincinnati, Ohio
Mar 4, 1995*		at Marquette	L 61–80	22–8	Bradley Center; Milwaukee, Wisconsin
Great Midwest Conference Tournament
Mar 10, 1995*		vs. Cincinnati; Quarterfinals	L 64–77	22–9	Bradley Center; Milwaukee, Wisconsin
NCAA Tournament
Mar 17, 1995*; CBS	(6 MW)	vs. (11 MW) Louisville; First round	W 77–56	23–9	Frank Erwin Center; Austin, Texas
Mar 19, 1995*; CBS	(6 MW)	vs. (3 MW) No. 12 Purdue; Second Round	W 75–73	24–9	Frank Erwin Center; Austin, Texas
Mar 24, 1995*; CBS	(6 MW)	vs. (2 MW) No. 6 Arkansas; Midwest Regional semifinal – Sweet Sixteen	L 91–96 ^{OT}	24–10	Kemper Arena; Kansas City, Missouri
*Non-conference game. ^{#}Rankings from AP Poll. (#) Tournament seedings in parentheses. MW=Midwest. All times are in Eastern Time.
