= 1994–95 Saint Louis Billikens men's basketball team =

American college basketball season

1994–95 Saint Louis Billikens men's basketball
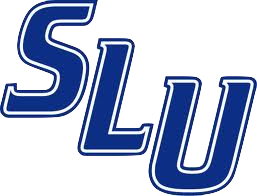

NCAA tournament, second round
- Conference: Great Midwest Conference
- Record: 23–8 (8–4 GMC)
- Head coach: Charlie Spoonhour (3rd season)
- Assistant coaches: Greg Lackey; Kelvin Lee; Don Parr (1st season)
- Home arena: Kiel Center

1994–95 Great Midwest Conference men's basketball standings
| | Conf. | | | | Overall |
| Team | W | | L | PCT | W | | L | PCT |
|---|---|---|---|---|---|---|---|---|
| Memphis | 9 | – | 3 | .750 | 24 | – | 10 | .706 |
| Saint Louis | 8 | – | 4 | .667 | 23 | – | 8 | .742 |
| Marquette | 7 | – | 5 | .583 | 21 | – | 12 | .636 |
| Cincinnati † | 7 | – | 5 | .583 | 22 | – | 12 | .647 |
| DePaul | 6 | – | 6 | .500 | 17 | – | 11 | .607 |
| UAB | 5 | – | 7 | .417 | 14 | – | 16 | .467 |
| Dayton | 0 | – | 12 | .000 | 7 | – | 20 | .259 |
† 1995 GMC tournament winner Rankings from AP poll

The 1994–95 Saint Louis Billikens men's basketball team represented Saint Louis University in the 1994–95 NCAA Division I men's basketball season. The Billikens were led by head coach Charlie Spoonhour who was in his third season at Saint Louis. The team played their home games at the brand new Kiel Center and were a member of the Great Midwest Conference. The Billikens finished the season 23–8, 8–4 in GMC play to finish 2nd. They lost in the championship game of the GMC tournament, but received an at-large bid to the NCAA tournament as No. 9 seed in the East region. The Billikens eliminated Minnesota in the opening round before they were defeated by No. 1 seed and Wake Forest in the second round.

== Roster ==
1994–95 Saint Louis Billikens men's basketball team
Players
Coaches

| Pos. | # | Name | Height | Weight | Year | Previous school | Hometown |
|---|---|---|---|---|---|---|---|
| G | 10 | Carl Turner | 5 ft 11 in (1.8 m) | 165 lb (75 kg) | Sr | DuVal | Suitland, Maryland |
| G | 12 | Carlos McCauley | 5 ft 11 in (1.8 m) | 170 lb (77 kg) | Jr | Charleston | Charleston, Missouri |
| G | 13 | Erwin Claggett | 6 ft 1 in (1.85 m) | 185 lb (84 kg) | Sr | Venice | Venice, Illinois |
| G | 20 | H Waldman | 6 ft 3 in (1.91 m) | 195 lb (88 kg) | Sr | Clark | Las Vegas, Nevada |
| G | 22 | Derek Falb | 5 ft 10 in (1.78 m) | 175 lb (79 kg) | Jr | Chaminade | St. Louis, Missouri |
| F | 23 | Corey Grays | 6 ft 5 in (1.96 m) | 205 lb (93 kg) | RS Jr | Central | San Angelo, Texas |
| F | 30 | David Robinson | 6 ft 6 in (1.98 m) | 210 lb (95 kg) | Jr | Rock Island | Rock Island, Illinois |
| G | 32 | Scott Highmark | 6 ft 5 in (1.96 m) | 205 lb (93 kg) | Sr | Parkway | St. Louis, Missouri |
| F | 33 | Eric Jones | 6 ft 5 in (1.96 m) | 205 lb (93 kg) | Sr | Hillsboro | Hillsboro, Kansas |
| F | 34 | Greg Hardin | 6 ft 6 in (1.98 m) | 240 lb (109 kg) | Fr | Monsignor McClancy | Elmhurst, New York |
| F | 40 | Ryan Luechtefeld | 6 ft 8 in (2.03 m) | 190 lb (86 kg) | Fr | Okawville | Okawville, Illinois |
| F | 42 | Jeff Harris | 6 ft 5 in (1.96 m) | 225 lb (102 kg) | So | Parkview | Little Rock, Arkansas |
| F/C | 45 | Sekeue Barantine | 6 ft 8 in (2.03 m) | 210 lb (95 kg) | So | Texas | Texarkana, Texas |
| F | 45 | Donnie Campbell | 6 ft 6 in (1.98 m) | 215 lb (98 kg) | RS Sr | Tucumcari | Tucumcari, New Mexico |

Head coach

- Charlie Spoonhour

Assistant coach(es)

- Greg Lackey
- Kelvin Lee
- Don Parr

Legend

- (C) Team captain
- (S) Suspended
- (I) Ineligible
- (W) Walk-on
- Injured
- Current redshirt

Roster

== Schedule and results ==
| Date time, TV | Rank^{#} | Opponent^{#} | Result | Record | Site (attendance) city, state |
Regular season
| Nov 27, 1994* | | Bradley | W 66–59 | 1–0 | Kiel Center; St. Louis, Missouri |
| Dec 1, 1994* | | Sacramento State | W 90–49 | 2–0 | Kiel Center; St. Louis, Missouri |
| Dec 5, 1994* | | at Southern Illinois | W 72–65 | 3–0 | SIU Arena; Carbondale, Illinois |
| Dec 7, 1994* | | UMKC | W 95–68 | 4–0 | Kiel Center; St. Louis, Missouri |
| Dec 10, 1994* | | Creighton | W 83–56 | 5–0 | Kiel Center; St. Louis, Missouri |
| Dec 17, 1994* | | Bethune-Cookman | W 103–49 | 6–0 | Kiel Center; St. Louis, Missouri |
| Dec 19, 1994* | | SMU | W 93–69 | 7–0 | Kiel Center; St. Louis, Missouri |
| Dec 28, 1994* | | Austin Peay | W 71–54 | 8–0 | Kiel Center; St. Louis, Missouri |
| Jan 5, 1995* | | No. 4 UMass; Atlantic 10/Great Midwest Challenge | L 74–80 | 8–1 | Kiel Center (21,879); St. Louis, Missouri |
| Jan 7, 1995 | | UAB | W 81–56 | 9–1 (1–0) | Kiel Center; St. Louis, Missouri |
| Jan 11, 1995* | | at No. 23 Iowa State | L 66–79 | 9–2 | Hilton Coliseum; Ames, Iowa |
| Jan 14, 1995 | | at Dayton | W 82–39 | 10–2 (2–0) | University of Dayton Arena; Dayton, Ohio |
| Jan 16, 1995* | | at Detroit | W 71–60 | 11–2 | Calihan Hall; Detroit, Michigan |
| Jan 19, 1995 | | at No. 23 Cincinnati | L 73–84 | 11–3 (2–1) | Myrl H. Shoemaker Center; Cincinnati, Ohio |
| Jan 22, 1995 | | Marquette | W 81–73 | 12–3 (3–1) | Kiel Center; St. Louis, Missouri |
| Jan 25, 1995 | | at Memphis | L 80–84 | 12–4 (3–2) | The Pyramid; Memphis, Tennessee |
| Jan 28, 1995 | | No. 19 Cincinnati | W 75–68 | 13–4 (4–2) | Kiel Center; St. Louis, Missouri |
| Jan 30, 1995* | | Chicago State | W 112–71 | 14–4 | Kiel Center; St. Louis, Missouri |
| Feb 4, 1995 | | at UAB | L 54–70 | 14–5 (4–3) | UAB Arena; Birmingham, Alabama |
| Feb 9, 1995 | | at Marquette | W 55–48 | 15–5 (5–3) | Bradley Center; Milwaukee, Wisconsin |
| Feb 11, 1995 | | Memphis | W 68–52 | 16–5 (6–3) | Kiel Center; St. Louis, Missouri |
| Feb 15, 1995* | | Alcorn State | W 100–70 | 17–5 | Kiel Center; St. Louis, Missouri |
| Feb 19, 1995 | | at DePaul | L 64–66 | 17–6 (6–4) | Rosemont Horizon; Rosemont, Illinois |
| Feb 22, 1995 | | at SW Missouri State | W 62–49 | 18–6 | Hammons Student Center; Springfield, Missouri |
| Feb 25, 1995 | | Dayton | W 63–51 | 19–6 (7–4) | Kiel Center; St. Louis, Missouri |
| Mar 1, 1995* | | DePaul | W 77–61 | 20–6 (8–4) | Kiel Center; St. Louis, Missouri |
GMWC tournament
| Mar 9, 1995* | (2) | vs. (7) Dayton; Quarterfinals | W 78–62 | 21–6 | Bradley Center; Milwaukee, Wisconsin |
| Mar 10, 1995* | (2) | at (3) Marquette; Semifinals | W 73–56 | 22–6 | Bradley Center; Milwaukee, Wisconsin |
| Mar 11, 1995* | (2) | vs. (4) Cincinnati; Championship game | L 65–67 | 22–7 | Bradley Center; Milwaukee, Wisconsin |
NCAA tournament
| Mar 16, 1995* | (9 E) | vs. (8 E) Minnesota; First Round | W 64–61 ^{OT} | 23–7 | Baltimore Arena; Baltimore, Maryland |
| Mar 18, 1995* | (9 E) | vs. (1 E) No. 3 Wake Forest; Second Round | L 59–64 | 23–8 | Baltimore Arena; Baltimore, Maryland |
*Non-conference game. ^{#}Rankings from AP Poll. (#) Tournament seedings in parentheses. All times are in Central Time. (#) during NCAA Tournament is seed with Region E=East.
