= Erik Martin (basketball) =

American basketball coach & player (born 1971)

South Carolina State Bulldogs
- Title: Head coach
- League: Mid-Eastern Athletic Conference

Personal information
- Born: May 26, 1971 (age 55) West Covina, California, U.S.
- Listed height: 6 ft 7 in (2.01 m)
- Listed weight: 220 lb (100 kg)

Career information
- High school: Whittier Christian (La Habra, California)
- College: TCU (1989–1990); Santa Ana College (1990–1991); Cincinnati (1991–1993)
- NBA draft: 1993: undrafted
- Playing career: 1993–2002
- Position: Power forward
- Coaching career: 2003–present

Career history

Playing
- 1993–1995: Yakima Sun Kings
- 1996–1997: Omaha Racers
- 1997–1998: Idaho Stampede
- 1998: La Crosse Bobcats
- 1998: Yakima Sun Kings
- 2000: Luckipar Panthers
- 2000–2001: Denso Hoop Gang
- 2001–2002: Seoul SK Knights

Coaching
- 2003–2004: Jacobs Center HS (assistant)
- 2004–2006: Cincinnati State (assistant)
- 2006–2007: Kansas State (assistant)
- 2007–2022: West Virginia (assistant)
- 2022–present: South Carolina State

Career highlights
- As player: CBA champion (1995); CBA All-Defensive Team (1995); CBA All-Rookie First Team (1994); Second-team All-Great Midwest (1993); As coach: MEAC Coach of the Year (2025); MEAC regular season champion (2025)
Medals
Men's basketball
Representing United States
FIBA Americas Championship
Gold medal – first place	1997 Montevideo	Team competition
Pan American Games
Silver medal – second place	1995 Mar del Plata	Team competition

Erik Jonathan Martin (born May 26, 1971) is an American basketball coach and former professional player, currently serving as head coach for South Carolina State. A native of California, Martin played one season of college basketball at TCU before transferring to Santa Ana College, a junior college in California where he was a first-team All-State selection. In 1991 he joined the University of Cincinnati, and with the Bearcats he reached the Final Four during the 1992 NCAA tournament. After going undrafted in the 1993 NBA draft he played for various CBA teams and abroad in South Korea and Taiwan. He also earned two selections in the United States national team: he won the silver medal at the 1995 Pan American Games and the gold medal during the 1997 Tournament of the Americas. After retiring as a player he has held several assistant coach jobs, mainly for Bob Huggins, first at Kansas State and later at West Virginia.

== High school career ==
Martin is a native of West Covina, California, and he attended Whittier Christian High School in nearby La Habra, where he played as a center and power forward. A starter since his sophomore year, in his junior season Martin averaged 21.9 points and 14.1 rebounds per game, earning the Most Valuable Player award in the 1-A league and was selected in the All-Southern and All-State First Teams. Martin was again selected as first-team all-state for his senior year, during which he averaged 24.1 points per game. During his time at Whittier Christian, Martin was an honor student.

== College career ==
Martin signed to play for TCU in February 1988, having already signed a letter of intent in the previous months. Under head coach Moe Iba, Martin redshirted his true freshman season in 1988–89 and received limited playing time in the 1989–90 season as a 6-foot-5, 198-pound freshman; at the end of the season he had appeared in all 29 games played by the team, starting 7 of them, and he had posted averages of 6.9 points, 4.3 rebounds and 1.4 assists in 15.2 minutes per game; he was the 4th best rebounder and the 6th best scorer on his team.

In April 1990 Martin announced that he was leaving TCU and transferring to another school; he chose Santa Ana College (which at the time was called Rancho Santiago Junior College). While at Rancho Santiago, Martin averaged 22.5 points (832 total) and 9.4 rebounds per game over 37 games (he averaged 25 points per game over 12 games of conference play), and established a program record for highest field goal percentage in a season with 63.7%. At the end of the season Rancho Santiago won the state championship, and Martin was selected in the All-State first team. In 2006 Martin was inducted in the Santa Ana College Hall of Fame.

In 1991 Martin and junior college teammate Corie Blount decided to transfer to Cincinnati. Martin and Blount were recruited by assistant coach Steve Moeller, who had brought to the Bearcats other junior college players: Nick Van Exel, Terry Nelson and Herb Jones (who had transferred to Cincinnati in 1990). Martin chose jersey number 3 and in his first year with his new team he played in all 34 games of the season, being employed off the bench by coach Bob Huggins: he averaged 6.3 points and 4 rebounds while playing 16.4 minutes per game, and he was the 5th best scorer on the team, the 3rd best rebounder (behind Jones and Blount), and the 3rd best shotblocker (0.5 per game). The Bearcats experienced a successful season and won the Great Midwest Conference tournament, gaining access to the NCAA tournament: Martin played all 5 games of the tournament, averaging 7.4 points and 5.8 rebounds, and during the Final Four he recorded a double-double of 10 points and 10 rebounds against Michigan in a tournament-high 30 minutes of play.

Martin stayed at Cincinnati also for his senior season in 1992–93. On December 11, 1992, in a game against Southeast Missouri State, Martin shot 10-for-11 from the field (90.9%), recording the 2nd-best shooting performance in Cincinnati history at the time. On January 27, 1993, Martin recorded a career-high 6 steals against Xavier. Martin ended the season averaging 13.5 points, 6.7 rebounds and 1.4 assists in 27.1 minutes per game, having started all 31 games. He ranked 2nd on the team in scoring behind Van Exel, and was the team leader in rebounds and blocks per game; that year he also led the conference in field goal percentage with 60.3%. Cincinnati again qualified for the NCAA tournament, and Martin played all 4 games, recording a tournament-high 21 points against New Mexico State on March 21, and played 42 minutes against North Carolina on March 28, posting 16 points and 6 rebounds. In 1993 Martin was selected in the All-Great Midwest Conference Second Team.

=== College statistics ===
Year	Team	GP	GS	MPG	FG%	3P%	FT%	RPG	APG	SPG	BPG	PPG
1989–90	TCU	29	7	15.2	.681	.500	.587	4.3	1.4	0.4	0.7	6.9
1991–92	Cincinnati	34	0	16.4	.525	.000	.561	4.0	1.0	0.9	0.5	6.3
1992–93	Cincinnati	31	31	27.1	.603	.000	.650	6.7	1.4	1.5	0.5	13.5
Career		94	38	19.6	.597	.250	.611	5.0	1.3	1.0	0.5	8.9

== Professional career ==
After the end of his senior season in 1993, Martin was automatically eligible for the 1993 NBA draft, but he was not drafted by an NBA franchise. He was selected by the Grand Rapids Hoops in the 2nd round (21st overall) of the 1993 CBA draft. On October 28, 1993, Martin signed a non-guaranteed one-year contract with the Golden State Warriors of the NBA, as a replacement for injured forward Chris Gatling; he was waived on November 2, and signed with the Yakima Sun Kings of the CBA. In his rookie season in the CBA Martin played 55 games (22 starts), averaging 11.5 points and 5.6 rebounds per game, and also appeared in a playoff game, recording 14 points and 5 rebounds in 25 minutes of play. At the end of the season Martin was selected in the CBA All-Rookie First Team. For the following season Martin decided to stay with the Sun Kings, and appeared in 45 games with averages of 12.4 points, 5.4 rebounds, 1,8 assists, 1.4 steals and 1.7 blocks per game in 26 minutes per contest; he was selected in the All-Defensive Team and was the runner-up for Defensive Player of the Year, finishing behind Mike Bell. At the end of the season the Sun Kings won the league title, and Martin averaged 9.8 points and 5.7 rebounds over 14 playoff games.

In the summer of 1995 Martin had shoulder surgery, and did not play a single game during the 1995–96 CBA season. Martin had then signed with the Fort Wayne Fury, and was traded in June 1996 to the Omaha Racers. With the new team Martin found increased playing time, starting 22 of 47 games and averaging 9.8 points, 5.6 rebounds, 1.9 assists and 1.3 steals per game. He also participated in postseason play, averaging 8 points and 4.6 rebounds over 9 games. In 1997 Martin signed with the Idaho Stampede, a new franchise that selected him during the 1997 CBA expansion draft in late May. He started the season with the Stampede; after 10 games (9 starts) during which he averaged 8.2 points, 4.7 rebounds and a career-high 3.2 assists per game, Martin joined the La Crosse Bobcats, and played 35 games with the team, averaging 6.5 points and 4.9 rebounds. Towards the end of the season he joined the Yakima Sun Kings again, and played 5 regular season games and 5 playoff games.

In 2000 Martin played for the Luckipar Panthers in Taiwan. He then spent the 2000–01 season in Japan with Denso Hoop Gang. Martin played for the Seoul SK Knights for the 2001–02 KBL season in South Korea, averaging 14.8 points and 12.3 rebounds per game over 45 games.

== National team career ==
Martin was called up for the United States men's national basketball team for the first time in 1995 for the XII Pan American Games held in Mar del Plata, Argentina. The US national team was put together by Mike Thibault and included only players from the Continental Basketball Association, an American minor league: Martin was playing for the Yakima Sun Kings at the time, and had just won the 1994–95 CBA season with the team. During the competition Martin played 7 games, and averaged 7.7 points and 3.9 rebounds, shooting 75.8% from the field (second on the team behind Mike Williams). At the end of the Pan American Games the United States won the silver medal, having lost the final game to Argentina, despite Martin's 15 points and 8 rebounds.

Martin received a second call-up for Team USA in 1997, and was included in the team that participated in the 1997 Tournament of the Americas in Montevideo, Uruguay. Again, the team was formed by CBA players, and Martin was a member of the Idaho Stampede roster at the time. Martin played all 9 games during the competition, averaging 3.3 points and 2.8 rebounds per game, led the team in blocks with a total of 9 (tied with Michael McDonald), and won the gold medal. Martin ended his career in the national team with 16 total caps over a period of 2 years.

== Coaching career ==
After the end of his professional career as a player, Martin took up coaching. He started in 2003 at Jacobs Center High School in Cincinnati, Ohio, and had the double role of head coach of the junior varsity team and assistant coach for the varsity team for one season. He then joined the coaching staff of Cincinnati State Technical and Community College as an assistant to head coach Andre Tate, and spent two years in the position. In August 2006 he joined Bob Huggins' staff at Kansas State for the 2006–07 season, on his first position in an NCAA Division I program. When Huggins took up the head coach position at West Virginia, Martin followed him; he began working as an assistant coach in the 2007–08 season.

=== South Carolina State ===
On July 11, 2022, it was announced that Martin would become the next head coach for South Carolina State, his first head coaching role.

== Head coaching record ==
Record table
Season	Team	Overall	Conference	Standing	Postseason
South Carolina State Bulldogs (MEAC) (2022–present)
2022–23	South Carolina State	5–26	2–12	8th	
2023–24	South Carolina State	14–18	9–5	T–2nd	
2024–25	South Carolina State	20–13	11–3	T–1st	
2025–26	South Carolina State	10–22	7–7	5th	
2026–27	South Carolina State	0–0	0–0		
South Carolina State:		49–79 (.383)	29–27 (.518)		
Total:		49–79 (.383)			
National champion Postseason invitational champion Conference regular season champion Conference regular season and conference tournament champion Division regular season champion Division regular season and conference tournament champion Conference tournament champion
