= 2014–15 West Virginia Mountaineers men's basketball team =

American college basketball season

2014–15 West Virginia Mountaineers men's basketball

Puerto Rico Tip-Off champions

NCAA tournament, Sweet Sixteen
- Conference: Big 12 Conference

Ranking
- Coaches: No. 18
- AP: No. 20
- Record: 25–10 (11–7 Big 12)
- Head coach: Bob Huggins (8th season)
- Assistant coaches: Larry Harrison; Ron Everhart; Erik Martin
- Home arena: WVU Coliseum

2014–15 Big 12 men's basketball standings
	Conf.				Overall
Team	W		L	PCT	W		L	PCT
No. 10 Kansas	13	–	5	.722	27	–	9	.750
No. 9 Iowa State †	12	–	6	.667	25	–	9	.735
No. 13 Oklahoma	12	–	6	.667	24	–	11	.686
No. 16 Baylor	11	–	7	.611	24	–	10	.706
No. 20 West Virginia	11	–	7	.611	25	–	10	.714
Oklahoma State	8	–	10	.444	18	–	14	.563
Texas	8	–	10	.444	20	–	14	.588
Kansas State	8	–	10	.444	15	–	17	.469
TCU	4	–	14	.222	18	–	15	.545
Texas Tech	3	–	15	.167	13	–	19	.406
† 2015 Big 12 Tournament winner Rankings from AP poll

The 2014–15 West Virginia Mountaineers men's basketball team represented West Virginia University during the 2014–15 NCAA Division I men's basketball season. The Mountaineers were coached by eighth year head coach Bob Huggins and played their home games at WVU Coliseum. They were members of the Big 12 Conference. They finished the season 25–10, 11–7 in Big 12 play to finish in a tie for fourth place. They lost in the quarterfinals of the Big 12 tournament to Baylor. They received an at-large bid to the NCAA tournament where they defeated Buffalo in the second round and Maryland in the third round before losing in the Sweet Sixteen to Kentucky.

== Previous season ==
The Mountaineers finished the season 17–16, 9–9 in Big 12 play to finish in a tie for sixth place. They lost in the quarterfinals of the Big 12 tournament to Texas. They were invited to the National Invitation Tournament where they lost in the first round Georgetown.

== Departures ==
Name	Number	Pos.	Height	Weight	Year	Hometown	Notes
Remi Dibo	0	F	6'9"	220	Junior	Montreuil, France	Signed to play professionally in France
Eron Harris	10	G	6'2"	195	Sophomore	Indianapolis, IN	Transferred to Michigan State
Terry Henderson	15	G	6'3"	200	Sophomore	Raleigh, NC	Transferred to NC State

=== Incoming transfers ===
Name	Number	Pos.	Height	Weight	Year	Hometown	Previous School
Jaysean Paige	0	G	6'1"	200	Junior	Hazard, KY	Junior college transfer from Moberly Area Community College
Tarik Phillip	12	G	6'3"	195	Sophomore	Brooklyn, NY	Junior college transfer from Independence Community College.
BillyDee Williams	22	G	6'6"	215	Junior	Orlando, FL	Junior college transfer from South Plains College.

== Recruits ==
College recruiting information
Name	Hometown	School	Height	Weight	Commit date
Elijah Macon; PF	Columbus, OH	Brewster Academy (NH)	6 ft 8 in (2.03 m)	225 lb (102 kg)	Sep 23, 2011
Elijah Macon; PF	Recruit ratings: Scout: Rivals: 247Sports: ESPN:				
Daxter Miles; PG	Baltimore, MD	Dunbar	6 ft 2 in (1.88 m)	175 lb (79 kg)	Jun 1, 2013
Daxter Miles; PG	Recruit ratings: Scout: Rivals: 247Sports: ESPN:				
Overall recruit ranking: Scout: Not Ranked Rivals: 23 ESPN: 20
Note: In many cases, Scout, Rivals, 247Sports, On3, and ESPN may conflict in their listings of height and weight.; In these cases, the average was taken. ESPN grades are on a 100-point scale.; Sources: "West Virginia 2014 Basketball Commitments". Rivals.; "2014 West Virginia Basketball Commits". Scout.; "ESPN". ESPN.; "Scout.com Team Recruiting Rankings". Scout.; "2014 Team Ranking". Rivals.

== Roster ==
2014–15 West Virginia Mountaineers men's basketball team
Players
Coaches

Pos.	#	Name	Height	Weight	Year	Previous school	Hometown
G	0	Jaysean Paige	6 ft 2 in (1.88 m)	200 lb (91 kg)	Jr	Moberly Area CC	Jamestown, NY
F	1	Jonathan Holton	6 ft 7 in (2.01 m)	220 lb (100 kg)	RS Jr	Palm Beach State CC	Miami, FL
G	2	Jevon Carter	6 ft 2 in (1.88 m)	185 lb (84 kg)	Fr	Proviso East HS	Maywood, IL
G	3	Juwan Staten	6 ft 1 in (1.85 m)	190 lb (86 kg)	RS Sr	Dayton	Dayton, OH
G	4	Daxter Miles, Jr.	6 ft 3 in (1.91 m)	185 lb (84 kg)	Fr	Notre Dame Prep	Baltimore, MD
F	5	Devin Williams	6 ft 9 in (2.06 m)	255 lb (116 kg)	So	Montverde Academy	Cincinnati, OH
G	10	Chase Connor	6 ft 1 in (1.85 m)	190 lb (86 kg)	So	Shady Spring HS	Shady Spring, WV
F	11	Nathan Adrian	6 ft 9 in (2.06 m)	235 lb (107 kg)	So	Morgantown	Morgantown, WV
G	12	Tarik Phillip	6 ft 3 in (1.91 m)	185 lb (84 kg)	So	Independence CC	Brooklyn, NY
G	13	James Long	5 ft 11 in (1.8 m)	190 lb (86 kg)	So	Wofford	Charleston, WV
G	14	Gary Browne	6 ft 1 in (1.85 m)	195 lb (88 kg)	Sr	Arlington Country Day	Cupey, San Juan, Puerto Rico
F	20	Brandon Watkins	6 ft 9 in (2.06 m)	245 lb (111 kg)	So	Grady	Decatur, GA
F	21	BillyDee Williams	6 ft 6 in (1.98 m)	215 lb (98 kg)	Jr	South Plains College	Orlando, FL
G	23	Tyrone Hughes	6 ft 0 in (1.83 m)	185 lb (84 kg)	Jr	Whitney M. Young Magnet	Chicago, IL
G	30	Richard Romero	6 ft 0 in (1.83 m)	190 lb (86 kg)	Jr	Greenbrier East	White Sulphur Springs, WV
F	34	Kevin Noreen	6 ft 10 in (2.08 m)	245 lb (111 kg)	Sr	Minnesota Transitions Charter	Minneapolis, MN
F	45	Elijah Macon	6 ft 9 in (2.06 m)	240 lb (109 kg)	RS Fr	Brewster Academy	Columbus, OH

Head coach

- Bob Huggins (West Virginia)

Assistant coach(es)

- Larry Harrison (Pittsburgh)
- Ron Everhart (Virginia Tech)
- Erik Martin (Cincinnati)

Legend

- (C) Team captain
- (S) Suspended
- (I) Ineligible
- (W) Walk-on
- Injured
- Current redshirt

Roster

== Schedule and results ==
Sources: and

Date time, TV	Rank^{#}	Opponent^{#}	Result	Record	Site (attendance) city, state
Exhibition
11/09/2014*; 4:00 pm, RTPT		Shepherd	W 109–60		WVU Coliseum (4,879); Morgantown, WV
Non-conference games
11/14/2014*; 7:00 pm		Monmouth	W 64–54	1–0	WVU Coliseum (6,792); Morgantown, WV
11/16/2014*; 3:00 pm, RTPT		Lafayette	W 83–56	2–0	WVU Coliseum (6,089); Morgantown, WV
11/20/2014*; 7:30 pm, ESPNU		vs. George Mason; Puerto Rico Tip-Off Quarterfinals	W 91–65	3–0	Roberto Clemente Coliseum (6,723); San Juan, PR
11/21/2014*; 5:00 pm, ESPN2		vs. Boston College; Puerto Rico Tip-Off semifinals	W 70–66	4–0	Roberto Clemente Coliseum (7,438); San Juan, PR
11/23/2014*; 6:00 pm, ESPN2		vs. No. 17 UConn; Puerto Rico Tip-Off championship	W 78–68	5–0	Roberto Clemente Coliseum (8,002); San Juan, PR
11/26/2014*; 7:30 pm	No. 21	vs. VMI	W 103–72	6–0	Charleston Civic Center (8,102); Charleston, WV
11/29/2014*; 7:30 pm	No. 21	College of Charleston; Puerto Rico Tip-Off	W 86–57	7–0	WVU Coliseum (7,367); Morgantown, WV
12/04/2014*; 7:00 pm, ESPN2	No. 16	LSU; Big 12/SEC Challenge	L 73–74	7–1	WVU Coliseum (10,802); Morgantown, WV
12/07/2014*; 6:00 pm, ESPN3	No. 16	at Northern Kentucky	W 67–42	8–1	The Bank of Kentucky Center (5,089); Highland Heights, KY
12/14/2014*; 4:30 pm, RTPT	No. 22	vs. Marshall; Chesapeake Energy Capital Classic	W 69–66	9–1	Charleston Civic Center (10,749); Charleston, WV
12/20/2014*; 9:30 pm, ESPN2	No. 22	vs. NC State; Gotham Classic	W 83–69	10–1	Madison Square Garden (8,088); New York City, NY
12/22/2014*; 7:30 pm	No. 18	Wofford	W 77–44	11–1	WVU Coliseum (7,897); Morgantown, WV
12/30/2014*; 2:00 pm, ESPNU	No. 17	Virginia Tech	W 82–51	12–1	WVU Coliseum (13,330); Morgantown, WV
Conference games
01/03/2015; 4:00 pm, RTPT	No. 17	at No. 23 TCU	W 78–67	13–1 (1–0)	Wilkerson-Greines Activity Center (4,918); Fort Worth, TX
01/05/2015; 7:00 pm, ESPNU	No. 14	at Texas Tech	W 78–67	14–1 (2–0)	United Supermarkets Arena (6,073); Lubbock, TX
01/10/2015; 8:00 pm, ESPN2	No. 14	No. 17 Iowa State	L 72–74	14–2 (2–1)	WVU Coliseum (12,076); Morgantown, WV
01/13/2015; 7:00 pm, ESPNews	No. 16	No. 18 Oklahoma	W 86–65	15–2 (3–1)	WVU Coliseum (9,196); Morgantown, WV
01/17/2015; 6:15 pm, ESPN	No. 16	at No. 20 Texas	L 50–77	15–3 (3–2)	Frank Erwin Center (13,204); Austin, TX
01/24/2015; 2:00 pm, ESPNU	No. 18	TCU	W 86–85 ^{OT}	16–3 (4–2)	WVU Coliseum (12,756); Morgantown, WV
01/27/2015; 7:00 pm, ESPN2	No. 17	at Kansas State	W 65–59	17–3 (5–2)	Bramlage Coliseum (12,528); Manhattan, KS
01/31/2015; 12:00 pm, ESPNU	No. 17	Texas Tech	W 77–58	18–3 (6–2)	WVU Coliseum (12,192); Morgantown, WV
02/03/2015; 8:00 pm, ESPN2	No. 15	at No. 21 Oklahoma	L 52–71	18–4 (6–3)	Lloyd Noble Center (10,154); Norman, OK
02/07/2015; 12:00 pm, ESPNU	No. 15	No. 19 Baylor	L 69–87	18–5 (6–4)	WVU Coliseum (12,783); Morgantown, WV
02/11/2015; 7:00 pm, ESPNU	No. 21	Kansas State	W 76–72	19–5 (7–4)	WVU Coliseum (8,762); Morgantown, WV
02/14/2015; 4:00 pm, ESPN2	No. 21	at No. 14 Iowa State	L 59–79	19–6 (7–5)	Hilton Coliseum (14,384); Ames, IA
02/16/2015; 9:00 pm, ESPN	No. 23	No. 8 Kansas	W 62–61	20–6 (8–5)	WVU Coliseum (7,033); Morgantown, WV
02/21/2015; 2:00 pm, ESPNews	No. 23	at No. 22 Oklahoma State	W 73–63	21–6 (9–5)	Gallagher-Iba Arena (8,610); Stillwater, OK
02/24/2015; 7:00 pm, ESPN2	No. 20	Texas	W 71–64	22–6 (10–5)	WVU Coliseum (12,048); Morgantown, WV
02/28/2015; 4:00 pm, ESPNU	No. 20	at No. 19 Baylor	L 66–78	22–7 (10–6)	Ferrell Center (9,385); Waco, TX
03/03/2015; 9:00 pm, ESPN2	No. 20	at No. 9 Kansas	L 69–76 ^{OT}	22–8 (10–7)	Allen Fieldhouse (16,300); Lawrence, KS
03/07/2015; 2:00 pm, ESPNews	No. 20	Oklahoma State	W 81–72	23–8 (11–7)	WVU Coliseum (13,714); Morgantown, WV
Big 12 Tournament
03/12/2015; 12:30 pm, ESPN2	No. 18	vs. No. 16 Baylor; Quarterfinals	L 70–80	23–9	Sprint Center (18,972); Kansas City, MO
NCAA tournament
03/20/2015*; 2:10 pm, TNT	(5 MW) No. 20	vs. (12 MW) Buffalo; Second round	W 68–62	24–9	Nationwide Arena (18,417); Columbus, OH
03/22/2015*; 8:40 pm, TNT	(5 MW) No. 20	vs. (4 MW) No. 12 Maryland; Third round	W 69–59	25–9	Nationwide Arena (19,115); Columbus, OH
03/26/2015*; 9:45 pm, CBS	(5 MW) No. 20	vs. (1 MW) No. 1 Kentucky; Sweet Sixteen	L 39–78	25–10	Quicken Loans Arena (19,465); Cleveland, OH
*Non-conference game. ^{#}Rankings from AP Poll. (#) Tournament seedings in parentheses. MW=Midwest Region. All times are in Eastern Time.

== Rankings ==
Ranking movement Legend: ██ Increase in ranking. ██ Decrease in ranking. (RV) Received votes but unranked. (NR) Not ranked.
Poll	Pre	Wk 2	Wk 3	Wk 4	Wk 5	Wk 6	Wk 7	Wk 8	Wk 9	Wk 10	Wk 11	Wk 12	Wk 13	Wk 14	Wk 15	Wk 16	Wk 17	Wk 18	Wk 19	Final
AP	RV	NR	21	16	22	22	18	17	14	16	18	17	15	21т	23	20	20	18	20	N/A
Coaches	NR	NR	24	17	21т	20	17	15	14	15	17	17	12	20	22	19	20	18	21	18

== See also ==
- 2014–15 West Virginia Mountaineers women's basketball team
