= Bob Huggins =

American basketball coach (born 1953)

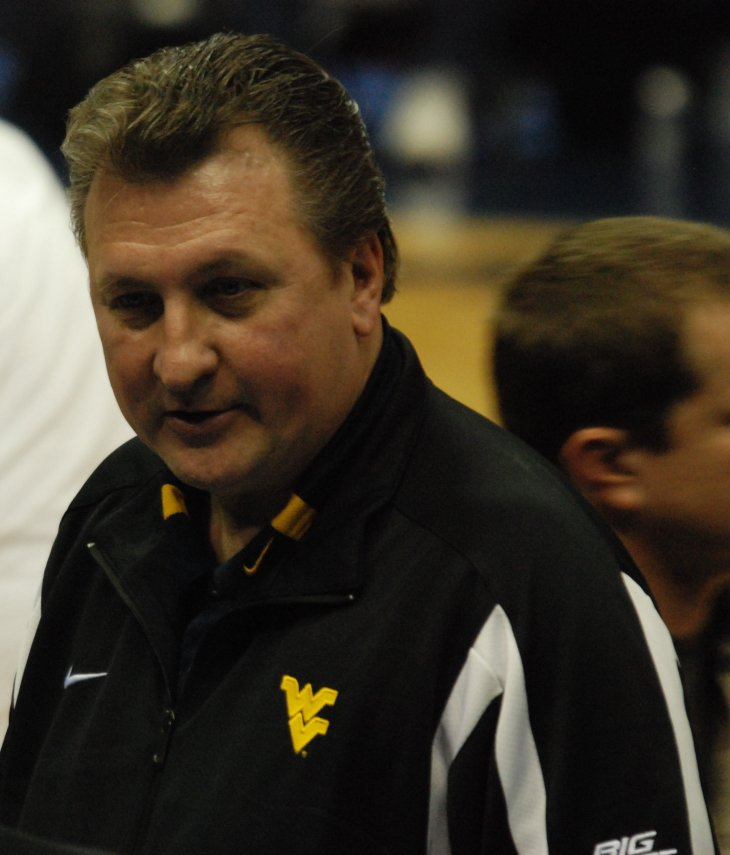
- Huggins in 2008

Biographical details
- Born: September 21, 1953 (age 73); Morgantown, West Virginia, U.S.

Playing career
- 1972–1973: Ohio
- 1975–1977: West Virginia
- Position: Point guard

Coaching career (HC unless noted)
- 1977–1978: West Virginia (assistant)
- 1978–1980: Ohio State (assistant)
- 1980–1983: Walsh
- 1983–1984: UCF (assistant)
- 1984–1989: Akron
- 1989–2005: Cincinnati
- 2006–2007: Kansas State
- 2007–2023: West Virginia

Head coaching record
- Overall: 935–414 (.693)
- Tournaments: 34–26 (NCAA Division I); 0–1 (NAIA); 3–4 (NIT); 1–1 (CBI)

Accomplishments and honors

Championships
- 2 NCAA Division I regional – Final Four (1992, 2010); 2 MOC regular season (1982, 1983); 2 MOC tournament (1982, 1983); OVC regular season (1986); OVC tournament (1986); 2 Great Midwest regular season (1992, 1993); 4 Great Midwest tournament (1992–1995); 8 C-USA regular season (1996–2002, 2004); 4 C-USA Tournament (1996, 1998, 2002, 2004); Big East tournament (2010)

Awards
- Jim Phelan Award (2015); C-USA Coach of the Decade (2005); OVC Coach of the Year (1986) 2× Great Midwest Coach of the Year (1992, 1993); 3× C-USA Coach of the Year (1998–2000); Big 12 Coach of the Year (2015)
- Basketball Hall of Fame; Inducted in 2022 (profile)

Robert Edward Huggins (born September 21, 1953), nicknamed "Huggy Bear", is an American former college basketball coach. He was the head coach at Walsh, Akron, Cincinnati, Kansas State, and West Virginia. He was inducted into the Naismith Memorial Basketball Hall of Fame in 2022.

Huggins is the sixth men's college basketball coach with 900 or more career victories. He has been to 24 total NCAA tournaments, including 23 in the last 26 seasons. He has led his teams to nine Sweet Sixteen appearances, four Elite Eight appearances (three at Cincinnati and one at West Virginia University), and two Final Four appearances (1992 with Cincinnati and 2010 with West Virginia). Huggins has also lost in the first two rounds of the NCAA Tournament a total of 16 times. As of March 2021, Huggins has averaged 23 wins per season over the course of his career. He is also the second coach to win 300 games at two schools.

Huggins released a statement announcing his resignation and retirement from West Virginia in 2023, following his drunk driving arrest. He later denied having officially resigned in a letter his lawyer sent to the university demanding his reinstatement.

== Playing career ==
Huggins, who had moved from Morgantown, West Virginia to Port Washington, Ohio, with his family, played basketball for his father, Charles, at Indian Valley South High School. As a senior, he helped lead his team to a 26–0 season. He was a three-year all-state pick, the Ohio Player of the Year in 1972, and he finished his high school career with 2,438 points, 12th in Ohio history at the time.

Huggins began college at Ohio University. After his freshman season he transferred to his native West Virginia. He played point guard for the Mountaineers from 1975 until 1977 under head coach Joedy Gardner. His career-high was 28 points against Virginia Tech. He averaged 13.2 points as a senior and totaled 800 career points in his three collegiate seasons.

He graduated from WVU magna cum laude with a double major in education and physical education and subsequently received a master's degree in health administration from WVU.

== Coaching career ==
=== Early coaching career ===
Huggins began his coaching career as a graduate assistant at West Virginia under Gardner in 1977. He then spent two years as an assistant to Eldon Miller at Ohio State University. Huggins was 27 when he became a collegiate head coach for the first time, at Walsh University in 1980. In three seasons at Walsh, he compiled a 71–26 record, twice earning NAIA District 22 Coach of the Year honors. Huggins directed the Walsh 1982–83 team to a perfect 30–0 regular season mark and an eventual 34–1 mark. After serving as an assistant at University of Central Florida for the 1983–84 season, Huggins was named head coach of the University of Akron. Huggins compiled a 97–46 record and reached post-season play in three of his five seasons at Akron, including an NCAA bid in 1985–86 season.

=== Cincinnati ===
Huggins was the head coach of the Cincinnati Bearcats from 1989 to 2005. When Huggins was hired, the Bearcats had not earned a bid to the NCAA tournament since 1977. The Bearcats were invited to the NIT in his first two years, and then advanced to the Final Four of the 1992 NCAA tournament, Huggins' third season as coach. This was the first of 13 consecutive seasons in which the Bearcats appeared in the NCAA tournament.

Overall, Huggins compiled a 399–127 record (.759) in his 16 years at Cincinnati, making him the winningest basketball coach in the school's history. Only Ed Jucker has a better win percentage among Bearcats coaches. Huggins directed Cincinnati to ten conference regular-season titles and eight league tournament titles. The Bearcats appeared in post-season play in each of Huggins' 16 seasons. In addition to their Final Four appearance in 1992, they advanced to the Elite Eight of the NCAA tournament two other times, in 1993 and 1996.

Huggins earned the Ray Meyer Award as the Conference USA Coach of the Year a record three times (1997–98, 1998–99, and 1999–2000), and was a unanimous choice for C-USA Coach of the Decade. He was selected national coach of the year by ESPN.com in 2001–02. He was named co-national coach of the year by The Sporting News and was Basketball Times' national coach of the year in 1997–98. His teams won five consecutive conference tournament titles—all four Great Midwest Conference titles from 1992 to 1995 and the first Conference USA men's basketball tournament in 1996. During his tenure, Huggins coached three consensus All-Americans: Danny Fortson, Kenyon Martin, and Steve Logan.

==== Resignation from Cincinnati ====
Huggins was arrested for driving under the influence in Fairfax, Ohio on June 8, 2004. He ultimately pleaded no contest to DUI. A judge ordered Huggins to pay a $350 fine plus court costs, and to attend a three-day state-certified intervention program.

On August 23, 2005, UC President Nancy L. Zimpher said that the Bearcat program under Huggins didn't fit with her plan to upgrade UC's academic reputation. Zimpher had been embarrassed by Huggins's DUI arrest, news of which broke on the morning of her first commencement as UC's president, at which Coretta Scott King spoke. In addition, an assistant coach, two players and a recruit had been arrested in the spring of 2005. Later that day, Zimpher and athletic director Bob Goin gave Huggins 24 hours to resign and take a $3 million buyout or accept reassignment outside the athletic department for the balance of his contract. Had Huggins not responded, he would have been fired. Multiple letters between UC and Huggins' attorney showed that Huggins had known weeks in advance that his ouster was imminent. He accepted the $3 million buyout.

=== Kansas State ===
After spending a year out of the coaching profession, on March 23, 2006, Huggins accepted the head coaching job at Kansas State University, replacing the fired Jim Wooldridge. Some of Huggins' recruiting targets included O. J. Mayo and Bill Walker, who had been seriously considering playing for him in Cincinnati. In his sole season at Kansas State, Huggins coached the Wildcats to a 23–12 overall record, and a 10–6 Big 12 record. The Wildcats were invited to the NIT, where they won one game.

=== West Virginia ===
Huggins was the head coach of the Mountaineers from 2007 to 2023. He has 345 coaching wins at WVU; only Gale Catlett has more.

==== Big East (2007–2012) ====
On April 5, 2007, Huggins announced that he had signed a five-year contract to be the head coach at his alma mater, West Virginia University. Huggins succeeded John Beilein, who left WVU to coach the Michigan Wolverines. On December 22, 2007, Huggins won his 600th game, on the road against Canisius. The Mountaineers were the 7th seed in the West region of the NCAA tournament where they defeated 2nd-seeded Duke 73–67 to move into the Sweet Sixteen, ending a streak of consecutive Sweet 16 appearances for Duke that had begun in 1997. WVU lost its next game against #3-seed Xavier, 79–75, in overtime. West Virginia finished the season ranked 17th in the AP poll. At the end of his first season at West Virginia, Huggins signed an 11-year contract extension that would keep him coaching at West Virginia until the age of 65.

On May 18, 2008, Huggins completed his recruiting class with the signing of small forward, Devin Ebanks. The #13-ranked prospect had signed with Indiana before decommitting and looking at Memphis, Texas, Rutgers and WVU. Ebanks was the last addition to the freshman class that included #11-power forward Kevin Jones, #34-power forward Roscoe Davis and #26-point guard Darryl Bryant. West Virginia began the 2008–09 season 4–0, led by senior Alex Ruoff and junior Da'Sean Butler. Having finished the regular season at 21–10 (10–8), West Virginia earned a first round bye in the 2009 Big East tournament, where they lost in the semifinals to Syracuse in overtime, 74–69. WVU earned a #6 seed in the NCAA tournament and lost their first-round game against the #11 seed Dayton Flyers, 68–60.

In 2012, Bleacher Report described Huggins's third season with the Mountaineers as having been his "best chance" to win a national title. During the 2009–10 season, West Virginia won a school-record 31 games. The team won the Big East tournament for the first time. As a #2 seed in the NCAA tournament, the Mountaineers went to their second Final Four in school history, and finished ranked #3 in the ESPN/USA Today poll.

In the 2010–11 season, the Mountaineers made it to the third round of the NCAA tournament, where they lost to Kentucky, 71–63. Huggins embraced Kentucky head coach John Calipari, a close friend, after the game, and wished him good luck.

On December 22, 2011, Huggins reached his 700th career victory by defeating Missouri State in the Las Vegas Classic.

==== Big 12 (2012–2023) ====
The 2012–13 season was the first for the Mountaineers in the Big 12 Conference. Huggins described the new conference's schedule as a "grind" early in the season, due to the increased travel requirements and high quality of opponents. He also remarked about the difference in officiating, with a higher incidence of foul calls in the Big 12 than in the Big East. After a rare sub-.500 season in 2012–13, Huggins told the press before the following season, "It's not acceptable to lose … I think it got to the point it was acceptable. I've never had that before, I don't want that again". During his first two seasons in the Big 12, the Mountaineers did not qualify for the NCAA tournament, Huggins's first two consecutive tournament misses as a head coach since his first two years at Cincinnati. In an interview with ESPN in 2016, Huggins said it was "100 percent my fault" that the teams were not able to qualify.

Huggins is credited with the introduction of "Press Virginia", a pressing defense that helped the team win 14 of its first 15 games in the 2014–15 season. The defense was said to have "met its match" in the 2016 NCAA tournament, when 14th-seeded Stephen F. Austin defeated 3rd-seeded WVU in the first round. "I don't know why anybody would waste energy pressing us," Huggins said after the game. "We'll throw it to you regardless. That would be a waste of energy really. We're very charitable. We're one of the most charitable groups in college basketball. The second straight game we've turned it over 20 times." Early in the 2017–18 season, Huggins suggested that Press Virginia might not be used as often, due to his roster being depleted.

On November 6, 2017, WVU and Huggins agreed to a four-year contract extension that included an option for him to step aside or continue coaching after the 2021–22 season, and starting with the 2022–23 season, an option to continue coaching or to work elsewhere in the athletic department through June 2027.

Despite beginning the 2018–19 season ranked No. 13, the Mountaineers finished the regular season at 12–19 (4–14), earning last place in Big 12 conference play for the first time. Despite finishing last in the conference, the Mountaineers upset Oklahoma and No. 7 Texas Tech to advance to the conference tournament semifinals. This led Huggins to tweet a video of himself—when he was the head coach of the Cincinnati Bearcats—emerging from a coffin to say, "Why all the long faces? We're not dead yet!" West Virginia lost to No. 17 Kansas in the semifinals the next day. The Mountaineers were invited to the College Basketball Invitational, where they beat Grand Canyon in the first round before losing to Coastal Carolina in the quarterfinals. The team's 21 losses were the most in a season in school history.

In November 2020, three months after Thom Brennaman was suspended for using an anti-gay slur on a hot mic while broadcasting a Cincinnati Reds game, Huggins invited Brennaman to speak to the WVU men's basketball team. Huggins thanked Brennaman on Twitter, writing that Brennaman's message "isn't one of excuses but one of accountability." After Huggins faced criticism in 2023 for using the same slur on a live radio show in Cincinnati, several journalists wrote that Huggins must have been aware of how offensive the term was because of his decision to invite and acknowledge Brennaman.

In 2021, West Virginia defeated 14th seed Morehead State in the NCAA tournament before losing in a three-point upset to Jim Boeheim's Syracuse Orange in the second round. The Mountaineers' win over Morehead State was also Bob Huggins' 900th career victory. On November 18, 2021, Huggins earned his 903rd career victory by defeating Elon in the quarterfinals of the Charleston Classic, passing Bob Knight all-time among Division I coaches and tying Roy Williams for fourth all-time. Three days later, Huggins passed Williams when the Mountaineers beat Clemson. Upon passing Williams in career wins, Huggins remarked, "I’m not going to quit until I beat Roy in something." In the 2022 Big 12 men's basketball tournament, WVU defeated Kansas State 73–67 in the preliminary round and lost 87–63 to Kansas in the next day's quarterfinal round. Huggins was given two technical fouls and ejected from the game against Kansas after fiercely disputing a technical foul called on Taz Sherman.

==== Offensive remarks ====
On May 8, 2023, Bob Huggins used a homophobic slur and expressed anti-Catholic sentiment when talking about Xavier fans on The Bill Cunningham Show, a radio show airing on WLW in Cincinnati. Some members of the sports media said that Huggins should resign or be fired as a result. Huggins issued an apology for the statement, calling it "completely insensitive and abhorrent" and promising to fully accept any consequences. In response to Huggins's remarks, West Virginia University stated, "The situation is under review and will be addressed by the university and its athletics department."

Some faculty at WVU expressed disappointment about Huggins's comments and outrage regarding increased use of homophobic slurs among the student body as a show of support for Huggins. Morgantown Pride, an LGBTQ+ support organization in Morgantown, called for WVU to terminate Huggins's employment. Some national sports commentators called for Huggins to be fired for his remarks, while others argued that firing Huggins would have been an overreaction, since the inappropriate slur that Huggins used has been used for decades in banter among fans of rival teams. Many of WVU's top donors continued to support Huggins after his comments on the radio caused offense. One long-time WVU donor, a gay man, told WV Sports Now that he planned to redirect his donations away from the athletic department in response to Huggins's comments.

==== Second drunk driving arrest ====
On June 16, 2023, Huggins was arrested in Pittsburgh and charged with driving while under the influence of alcohol. Police officers reported that they found him in an SUV that was blocking traffic, with the driver's door ajar and with a "flat and shredded tire". Bags of empty beer containers were found in the vehicle. A breath test determined his blood alcohol content to be 0.21%, more than two times the legal limit of 0.08%. Officers asked Huggins what city he was in, and did not get a clear response, with Huggins making mention of Columbus, Ohio, a few times.

==== Resignation and retirement ====
On June 17, 2023, Huggins released a statement announcing his resignation from West Virginia. In the statement, he also announced his retirement.

On July 2, 2023, in a letter sent to West Virginia University, Huggins, through his attorney, David A. Campbell, claimed that "he never signed a resignation letter and never communicated a resignation to anyone by WVU." According to the Associated Press, Huggins threatened legal action if he was not given his job back. In response, WVU officials stated that they were "confused by the allegations within the letter".

In October of 2026, Huggins's family announced to the public that Bob was suffering from a progressive neurological condition that had reached a point where it was effecting his daily life

== Head coaching record ==
Record table
Season	Team	Overall	Conference	Standing	Postseason
Walsh Cavaliers (Mid-Ohio Conference) (1980–1983)
1980–81	Walsh	14–16	9–5	3rd or 4th	
1981–82	Walsh	23–9	11–3	1st	
1982–83	Walsh	34–1	14–0	1st	NAIA First Round
Walsh:		71–26 (.732)	34–8 (.810)		
Akron Zips (Ohio Valley Conference) (1984–1987)
1984–85	Akron	12–14	6–8	6th	
1985–86	Akron	22–8	10–4	T–1st	NCAA Division I Round of 64
1986–87	Akron	21–9	9–5	2nd	
Akron Zips (NCAA Division I independent) (1987–1989)
1987–88	Akron	21–7			
1988–89	Akron	21–8			
Akron:		97–46 (.678)	25–17 (.595)		
Cincinnati Bearcats (Metro Conference) (1989–1991)
1989–90	Cincinnati	20–14	9–5	2nd	NIT Second Round
1990–91	Cincinnati	18–12	8–6	3rd	NIT Second Round
Cincinnati Bearcats (Great Midwest Conference) (1991–1995)
1991–92	Cincinnati	29–5	8–2	T–1st	NCAA Division I Final Four
1992–93	Cincinnati	27–5	8–2	1st	NCAA Division I Elite Eight
1993–94	Cincinnati	22–10	7–5	4th	NCAA Division I Round of 64
1994–95	Cincinnati	23–11	7–5	T–3rd	NCAA Division I Round of 32
Cincinnati Bearcats (Conference USA) (1995–2005)
1995–96	Cincinnati	28–5	11–3	1st (Blue)	NCAA Division I Elite Eight
1996–97	Cincinnati	26–8	12–2	1st (Blue)	NCAA Division I Round of 32
1997–98	Cincinnati	27–6	12–4	1st (American)	NCAA Division I Round of 32
1998–99	Cincinnati	27–6	12–4	1st (American)	NCAA Division I Round of 32
1999–00	Cincinnati	29–4	16–0	1st (American)	NCAA Division I Round of 32
2000–01	Cincinnati	25–10	11–5	1st (American)	NCAA Division I Sweet 16
2001–02	Cincinnati	31–4	14–2	1st (American)	NCAA Division I Round of 32
2002–03	Cincinnati	17–12	9–7	T–3rd (American)	NCAA Division I Round of 64
2003–04	Cincinnati	25–7	12–4	T–1st	NCAA Division I Round of 32
2004–05	Cincinnati	25–8	12–4	T–2nd	NCAA Division I Round of 32
Cincinnati:		399–127 (.759)	168–60 (.737)		
Kansas State Wildcats (Big 12 Conference) (2006–2007)
2006–07	Kansas State	23–12	10–6	4th	NIT Second Round
Kansas State:		23–12 (.657)	10–6 (.625)		
West Virginia Mountaineers (Big East Conference) (2007–2012)
2007–08	West Virginia	26–11	11–7	T–5th	NCAA Division I Sweet 16
2008–09	West Virginia	23–12	10–8	T–7th	NCAA Division I Round of 64
2009–10	West Virginia	31–7	13–5	T–2nd	NCAA Division I Final Four
2010–11	West Virginia	21–12	11–7	T–6th	NCAA Division I Round of 32
2011–12	West Virginia	19–14	9–9	8th	NCAA Division I Round of 64
West Virginia Mountaineers (Big 12 Conference) (2012–2023)
2012–13	West Virginia	13–19	6–12	8th	
2013–14	West Virginia	17–16	9–9	T–6th	NIT First Round
2014–15	West Virginia	25–10	11–7	T–3rd	NCAA Division I Sweet 16
2015–16	West Virginia	26–9	13–5	2nd	NCAA Division I Round of 64
2016–17	West Virginia	28–9	12–6	T–2nd	NCAA Division I Sweet 16
2017–18	West Virginia	26–11	11–7	T–2nd	NCAA Division I Sweet 16
2018–19	West Virginia	15–21	4–14	10th	CBI Quarterfinal
2019–20	West Virginia	21–10	9–9	T–3rd	No postseason held
2020–21	West Virginia	19–10	11–6	T–3rd	NCAA Division I Round of 32
2021–22	West Virginia	16–17	4–14	10th	
2022–23	West Virginia	19–15	7–11	8th	NCAA Division I Round of 64
West Virginia:		345–203 (.630)	150–135 (.526)		
Total:		934–415 (.692)			
National champion Postseason invitational champion Conference regular season champion Conference regular season and conference tournament champion Division regular season champion Division regular season and conference tournament champion Conference tournament champion

== Coaching tree ==
Several former assistant coaches and players of Huggins have gone on to their own careers in coaching.

- Jerrod Calhoun: Fairmont State (2012–2017), Youngstown State (2017–2024), Utah State (2024–2026), Cincinnati (2026–present)
- Mick Cronin: Cincinnati (2006–2019), UCLA (2020–present)
- Larry Harrison: Hartford (2000–2006)
- Andy Kennedy: Cincinnati (2005–2006), Ole Miss (2006–2018), UAB (2020–present)
- John Loyer: Wabash Valley CC (1999–2000)
- Frank Martin: Kansas State (2007–2012), South Carolina (2012–2022), UMass (2022–present)
- Brad Underwood: Stephen F. Austin (2013–2016), Oklahoma State (2016–2017), Illinois (2017–present)
- Darris Nichols: Radford (2021–2025), La Salle (2025–present)
- Erik Martin: South Carolina State (2022–present)
- Joe Mazzulla: Boston Celtics (NBA) (2022–present)
- Josh Eilert: West Virginia (2023–2024, interim), Utah (2025, interim)

Several of those coaches have mentored assistants who became head coaches themselves, furthering Huggins' influence:

- Matt Figger: Austin Peay (2017-2021), UT Rio Grande Valley (2021–2024)
- Ethan Faulkner: Youngstown State (2024-present)
- Mike White: Louisiana Tech (2011-2015), Florida (2015-2022), Georgia (2022-present)

== Broadcasting career ==
Huggins was the host of The Bob Huggins Show, a talk show produced by Gold and Blue Nation, a partnership between WVU Athletics and WBOY TV.

After leaving the head coaching position at WVU, Huggins joined Full Court Press, a radio show about WVU basketball, presented by HD Media. Huggins also contributed commentary on March Madness television coverage in 2023.

== Personal life ==
Huggins was born in Morgantown, West Virginia on September 21, 1953. He and his wife have two daughters.

Huggins has a family history of heart problems: his father had a heart attack before the age of 40. In 2002, at Pittsburgh International Airport during a recruiting trip, Huggins experienced a heart attack himself. He was treated at a medical center in Beaver, Pennsylvania, where he had surgery to implant a stent. Later in his life, due to atrial fibrillation, Huggins had a defibrillator implanted. His defibrillator turned on during a game in 2017 against Texas, causing him to clutch his chest and fall down. He was examined at the scene by medical personnel, and resumed coaching afterwards.

The annual Bob Huggins Fish Fry has been held 11 times, most recently on January 27, 2023, to raise money for charity. At the 2023 event, where Charles Barkley was the headlining guest, a record 2,700 people attended. The event has raised more than $16 million for charities including the Norma Mae Huggins Cancer Research Endowment Fund, named after Huggins's mother, and the Remembering the Miners organization.

For each WVU win against Kansas, Huggins's contract stipulated a $25,000 win bonus, which he donated to the Norma Mae Huggins Cancer Research Endowment Fund. He has also hosted fundraising events for WVU, and he and his wife have donated to the university on their own. Following Huggins's use of a gay slur to describe Xavier University students, he made a "substantial donation" to support Xavier's Center for Faith and Justice and Center for Diversity and Inclusion.

On October 21, 2026, the Huggins family disclosed through the University of Cincinnati that Huggins was "living with a progressive cognitive condition that has begun to affect his memory, and aspects of his daily life".

== See also ==
- List of college men's basketball career coaching wins leaders
- List of NCAA Division I Men's Final Four appearances by coach
