= Bob Goin =

American coach and administrator (1936–2019)

Biographical details
- Born: October 3, 1936; Gary, Indiana, U.S.
- Died: October 12, 2019 (aged 83); Ponte Vedra Beach, Florida, U.S.

Playing career

Football
- c. 1958: Bethany (WV)

Basketball
- c. 1958: Bethany (WV)

Coaching career (HC unless noted)

Football
- 1960–1962: Bethany (WV) (assistant)
- 1963–1972: Bethany (WV)

Baseball
- ?: Bethany (WV)

Administrative career (AD unless noted)
- 1970–1976: Bethany (WV)
- 1976–1979: West Virginia (assistant AD)
- 1979–1981: California (PA)
- 1981–1989: Florida State (associate AD)
- 1990–1994: Florida State
- 1997–2005: Cincinnati

Head coaching record
- Overall: 45–32–2 (football)

Accomplishments and honors

Championships
- Football; 2 PAC (1965–1966)

Robert Goin (October 3, 1936 – October 12, 2019) was an American football and baseball coach and college athletics administrator. He was the head football coach at Bethany College in Bethany, West Virginia from 1963 to 1972, compiling a record of 45–32–2. He was also the college's head baseball coach and athletics director. Goin was the athletics director at California University of Pennsylvania from 1979 to 1981, Florida State University from 1990 to 1994 and the University of Cincinnati from 1997 to 2005

== Early life and playing career ==
Goin was a 1959 graduate of Bethany College, where he was a member of Phi Kappa Tau fraternity. He married his high-school sweetheart, Nancy, in 1957.

== Coaching career ==
Goin returned to Bethany in 1960 as an assistant football coach.

== Administrative career ==
Goin was athletic director and chair of the physical education department at Bethany from 1970 to 1976, and as a tenured professor. From 1976 to 1979, he was assistant athletics director at West Virginia University, and spent two years, from 1979 to 1981, as athletic director at California University of Pennsylvania.

For five years, from 1990 to 1994, Goin was the athletic director at Florida State, guiding the Seminoles into membership in the Atlantic Coast Conference (ACC). During his tenure, he also oversaw an $80 million expansion of all of the athletic facilities. Within this project, he helped to start the Doak Campbell Stadium expansion that boosted seating by nearly 20,000 and added classrooms to the buildings wrapped around the stadium. He later resigned his position after being accused by a weekly newspaper in Tallahassee of using a contractor involved in the school's stadium expansion to install a new roof over his home. An investigation by the Florida Times-Union newspaper revealed that hen paid more than the market price for the roof, and he was cleared of any wrongdoing by the Florida Ethics Commission.

During his tenure at Cincinnati, which began in 1997, the university joined the Big East Conference and developed the Richard E. Lindner Varsity Village, a comprehensive $80.3 million athletic facilities enhancement. Cincinnati's sports teams posted a combined winning percentage of nearly .600 in his eight years, claiming 29 conference titles, making 49 post-season appearances and producing 39 All-Americans under his leadership. Cincinnati's football team made its first post-season bowl appearance in 47 years. Goin placed a strong focus on developing UC student athletes' academic abilities during his tenure. He improved the academic support services they received and started programs that allowed those who exhausted their athletic eligibility to return to university in order to earn their degree. Nationally, the most notable event during his Cincinnati tenure was the dismissal of the basketball coach Bob Huggins. Goin retired from the director role at Cincinnati in 2005 to move closer to his four children and six grandchildren who resided in the Florida. The Football Team Meeting Room in the Lindner Center is named after Goin.

Goin was a member of the NCAA Division I Championships/Competition Cabinet and the NCAA Football Bowl Certification Subcommittee.

== Honors and death ==
Goin was inducted into the National Association of Collegiate Directors of Athletics Hall of Fame in 2013, the Western Chapter of the Pennsylvania Sports Hall of Fame in 2015 and the University of Cincinnati athletics Hall of Fame in 2005. He was also a member of the Penn Hills High School and Bethany College Halls of Fame and was inducted as a member of the inaugural class of the Phi Kappa Tau Hall of Fame in 2006.

Goin died after a heart attack on October 12, 2019, in Ponte Vedra Beach, Florida.

== Head coaching record ==
=== Football ===
Year	Team	Overall	Conference	Standing	Bowl/playoffs
Bethany Bison (Presidents' Athletic Conference) (1963–1972)
1963	Bethany	2–5	2–5	T–6th	
1964	Bethany	5–3	4–2	2nd	
1965	Bethany	5–3	5–1	1st	
1966	Bethany	6–0–1	5–0–1	1st	
1967	Bethany	5–3	4–2	2nd	
1968	Bethany	4–4	4–2	T–2nd	
1969	Bethany	6–2	4–2	T–2nd	
1970	Bethany	5–2	3–2	2nd	
1971	Bethany	3–5–1	2–3	T–4th	
1972	Bethany	4–5	3–4	T–5th	
Bethany:		45–32–2	36–25–1		
Total:		45–32–2			
National championship Conference title Conference division title or championship game berth
