= Larry Finch =

American basketball player-coach

Personal information
- Born: February 16, 1951 Memphis, Tennessee, U.S.
- Died: April 2, 2011 (aged 60) Memphis, Tennessee, U.S.
- Listed height: 6 ft 2 in (1.88 m)
- Listed weight: 185 lb (84 kg)

Career information
- High school: Melrose (Memphis, Tennessee)
- College: Memphis (1970–1973)
- NBA draft: 1973: 4th round, 68th overall pick
- Drafted by: Los Angeles Lakers
- Playing career: 1973–1975
- Position: Shooting guard
- Number: 21
- Coaching career: 1975–1997

Career history

Playing
- 1973–1975: Memphis Tams / Sounds

Coaching
- 1975–1979: UAB (assistant)
- 1979–1986: Memphis (assistant)
- 1986–1997: Memphis

Career highlights
- As player: Consensus second-team All-American (1973); MVC Player of the Year (1972); 3× First-team All-MVC (1971–1973); No. 21 retired by Memphis Tigers; As coach: Metro tournament champion (1987); Great Midwest regular season champion (1995); C-USA regular season champion (1996); 2× Metro Coach of the Year (1987, 1989); Great Midwest Coach of the Year (1995)
- Stats at Basketball Reference

Larry O. Finch (February 16, 1951 – April 2, 2011) was an American player and coach for the University of Memphis men's basketball team. He led the Memphis Tigers to the NCAA men's basketball championship game in 1973, where they lost to the UCLA Bruins led by Bill Walton.

== Playing career ==
Finch was born in Memphis, and played basketball for Melrose High School in the Orange Mound section of Memphis. He then entered Memphis State and played basketball under famed basketball coach Gene Bartow. This decision was somewhat controversial for both Memphis' black and white communities, given the recent assassination of Martin Luther King Jr. and the resultant heightened strain on race relations in Memphis, not to mention so few local African-American prep stars had been able to wear a Tiger uniform to that point. Some had advised Finch not to go, but whether or not he saw it as an opportunity to do something even more meaningful than playing for his local university, Finch loved his hometown team.

In his senior year at Memphis State, 1972–73, he and Larry Kenon led the basketball team to the Final Four. In the championship game, Finch scored 29 points, but lost to John Wooden's UCLA Bruins, a game where Bill Walton went 21 of 22 from the floor. Finch graduated the all-time leading scorer in Memphis history, and is currently the second all-time leading scorer for the University of Memphis.

Finch was drafted on the fourth round by the Los Angeles Lakers in 1973, but opted to join the local American Basketball Association team, the Memphis Tams. Finch played professionally for two years with the Tams, the Memphis Sounds and the Baltimore Hustlers and Baltimore Claws.

== Coaching career ==
In the 1980s, Finch was an assistant coach for Dana Kirk at Memphis State. Kirk was forced to leave Memphis State after violating NCAA regulations and becoming the subject of a criminal investigation, and while asking for and getting immunity from prosecution in the Kirk trial, Finch was made head coach in 1986. He would remain at the school, which was renamed the University of Memphis in 1994, until 1997.

Finch posted 10 out of 11 winning seasons, seven 20+ win seasons, and six NCAA tournaments. He recruited and developed such players as Elliot Perry, Penny Hardaway, and Lorenzen Wright. His 1991–92 team led by Hardaway and David Vaughn went to the Elite Eight of the NCAA tournament. During his tenure, the basketball players began to graduate in high numbers.

As a player, Finch was known for his shooting prowess, and his skills remained intact throughout his coaching days; he would routinely win games of H-O-R-S-E against his players and against assistant coaches in long-distance shooting contests after road game practices. Even while head coach, he maintained connections to his roots; he often visited Orange Mound barbershops, often delivering Memphis State posters and other team paraphernalia.

Despite Finch's overall success, during the mid-1990s more and more local blue chip recruits began leaving for other schools, specifically Todd Day to the University of Arkansas and others to the University of Tennessee. This began grating on Tiger fans, who had become used to seeing national powers built on primarily Memphis-area talent. While there was the Elite Eight team of 91–92, several of Finch's teams were considered under-achievers, such as the highly touted 1995–96 squad which lost to 12th seeded Drexel University in the first round of the NCAA Tournament.

Finch's contract was bought out at the end of the 1996–97 season for $413,660. The forced resignation was a public relations fiasco for the university and athletic director R. C. Johnson, as the deal was finalized immediately following Finch's final game in one of the concession areas of the Pyramid Arena. In accepting the buy-out of his contract, Finch declined a position of "special assistant" he had been offered by Johnson to stay on with the University.

The reasons for the buy out were not disclosed, though some speculated game attendance as a possible reason. Declining support from Tigers fans was also a possible motivation. Although a portion of the fan base had become disenchanted with Finch, even some of his detractors were critical of the way school officials handled it. He left as the school's all-time winningest coach, a record which stood until John Calipari passed him in 2007–08. However, after all of the Tigers' wins in the 2007–08 season were vacated, Finch recovered his standing as the school's winningest coach.

== After basketball ==
In 1998, Finch ran for the office of Shelby County Registrar and lost to the incumbent by only 127 votes despite having no government experience. He was briefly in the running for coaching positions at Tennessee State, Georgia State, and South Alabama.

In 2002, Finch suffered a debilitating stroke. People close to Finch created the Friends of Larry Finch Foundation to help offset his medical expenses. In December 2006, the foundation released a Larry Finch tribute CD called "Eye of the Tiger", featuring performers from Memphis' diverse musical community such as Al Green, The Bar-Kays, Gary Johns, John Kilzer, and Al Kapone.

Finch died on April 2, 2011, after a long illness. A wake was held in his honor on the University of Memphis campus April 8, 2011.

== Posthumous recognition ==
In 2019, the University of Memphis appointed a 16-member committee to develop plans for a plaza to honor Finch. The proposed completion date was to be October 2020. The idea for a memorial for Finch had originally been proposed in 2008 by Memphis Magazine managing editor Frank Murtaugh. Though it did not garner support then, the president of the University of Memphis, M. David Rudd, did meet with Murtaugh in 2018 after two columns published in the Magazine. The statue took three years to build, and has been erected in front of the Laurie-Walton Basketball Center on the south campus of the University.

== Head coaching record ==
Record table
Season	Team	Overall	Conference	Standing	Postseason
Memphis State Tigers (Metro Conference) (1986–1991)
1986–87	Memphis State	26–8	8–4	2nd	Ineligible due to NCAA violations
1987–88	Memphis State	20–12	6–6	T–3rd	NCAA Division I Second Round
1988–89	Memphis State	21–11	8–4	T–2nd	NCAA Division I First Round
1989–90	Memphis State	18–12	8–6	4th	NIT First Round
1990–91	Memphis State	17–15	7–7	T–4th	NIT Second Round
Memphis State / Memphis Tigers (Great Midwest Conference) (1991–1995)
1991–92	Memphis State	23–11	5–5	T–3rd	NCAA Division I Elite Eight
1992–93	Memphis State	20–12	7–3	2nd	NCAA Division I First Round
1993–94	Memphis State	13–16	4–8	T–5th	
1994–95	Memphis	24–10	9–3	1st	NCAA Division I Sweet 16
Memphis Tigers (Conference USA) (1995–1997)
1995–96	Memphis	22–8	11–3	1st (White)	NCAA Division I First Round
1996–97	Memphis	16–15	10–4	T–1st (White)	NIT First Round
Memphis State / Memphis:		220–130 (.629)	83–53 (.610)		
Total:		220–130 (.629)			
National champion Postseason invitational champion Conference regular season champion Conference regular season and conference tournament champion Division regular season champion Division regular season and conference tournament champion Conference tournament champion
