= 1995 Great Midwest Conference men's basketball tournament =

- Classification: Division I
- Season: 1994–95
- Teams: 7
- Site: Bradley Center; Milwaukee, Wisconsin
- Champions: Cincinnati (4th title)
- Winning coach: Bob Huggins (4th title)

1994–95 Great Midwest Conference men's basketball standings
	Conf.				Overall
Team	W		L	PCT	W		L	PCT
Memphis	9	–	3	.750	24	–	10	.706
Saint Louis	8	–	4	.667	23	–	8	.742
Marquette	7	–	5	.583	21	–	12	.636
Cincinnati †	7	–	5	.583	22	–	12	.647
DePaul	6	–	6	.500	17	–	11	.607
UAB	5	–	7	.417	14	–	16	.467
Dayton	0	–	12	.000	7	–	20	.259
† 1995 GMC tournament winner Rankings from AP poll

The 1995 Great Midwest Conference men's basketball tournament was held March 9–11, 1995. Although its winner did not receive an automatic bid to the 1995 NCAA tournament, the tournament champion, Cincinnati, received an at-large bid.

The 1995 tournament was the last one for the Great Midwest Conference, which was absorbed into Conference USA the following season.

Cincinnati completed a perfect run in the four years of competition in the Great Midwest Conference tournament, compiling a record of 10–0 in tournament play and winning all four tournament championships.

== Bracket and results ==
Quarterfinals; Thursday, March 9
4	Cincinnati	96
5	DePaul	95
2	Saint Louis	78
7	Dayton	62
3	UAB	46
6	Marquette	55

Semifinals; Friday, March 10
1	Memphis	64
4	Cincinnati	77
2	Saint Louis	73
3	Marquette	56

Final; Saturday, March 11
4	Cincinnati	67
2	Saint Louis	65
