= 2001–02 KBL season =

2001–2002 KBL season
- League: Korean Basketball League
- Sport: Basketball
- Duration: November 3, 2001 – April 19, 2002

Regular Season
- Season champions: Daegu Tongyang Orions
- Season MVP: (South Korea) Kim Seung-hyun (Tongyang)
- Top scorer: (United States) Eric Eberz (Korea Tender)

Finals
- Champions: Daegu Tongyang Orions
- Runners-up: Seoul SK Knights
- Finals MVP: (United States) Marcus Hicks (Tongyang)

KBL seasons
- ← 2000–01 2002–03 →

The 2001–02 Anycall Professional Basketball season was the sixth season of the Korean Basketball League which is held in the month of October and finishes by April of the next year.

== Regular season ==
RK	Team	G	W	L	PCT	GB	Tiebreaker
1	Daegu Tongyang Orions	54	36	18	0.667	–	–
2	Seoul SK Knights	54	32	22	0.593	4	–
3	Jeonju KCC Egis	54	30	24	0.556	6	5–1
4	Incheon SK Bigs	54	30	24	0.556	6	1–5
5	Changwon LG Sakers	54	28	26	0.519	8	3–3, +3
6	Anyang SBS Stars	54	28	26	0.519	8	3–3, –3
7	Yeosu Korea Tender Prumi	54	26	28	0.481	10	–
8	Seoul Samsung Thunders	54	24	30	0.444	12	–
9	Wonju Sambo Xers	54	18	36	0.333	18	4–2
10	Ulsan Mobis Automons	54	18	36	0.333	18	2–4

== Playoffs ==
First round
4	SK	0
5	LG	2
3	KCC	2
6	SBS	0

Semifinals
1	Tongyang	3
5	LG	2
2	SK	3
3	KCC	2

Finals
1	Tongyang	4
2	SK	3

2001–02 KBL Champions
Daegu Tongyang Orions
1st title

== Prize money ==
- Daegu Tongyang Orions: KRW 150,000,000 (champions + regular-season 1st place)
- Seoul SK Knights: KRW 80,000,000 (runners-up + regular-season 2nd place)
- Jeonju KCC Egis: KRW 20,000,000 (regular-season 3rd place)
