= Great Midwest Conference men's basketball tournament =

Great Midwest Conference men's basketball tournament (defunct)
- Conference basketball championship
- Sport: College basketball
- Conference: Great Midwest Conference
- Format: Single-elimination tournament
- Played: 1992–1995
- Most championships: Cincinnati (4)

Host stadiums
- Chicago Stadium (1992); The Pyramid (1993); Shoemaker Stadium (1994); Bradley Center (1995)

Host locations
- Chicago, IL (1992); Memphis, TN (1993); Cincinnati, OH (1994); Milwaukee, WI (1995)

The Great Midwest Conference men's basketball tournament was the conference championship tournament in men's basketball for the Great Midwest Conference (GMC). The tournament was held annually from 1992 to 1995, coming to an end when the Great Midwest Conference was absorbed into Conference USA for the 1995–96 season.

The Great Midwest Conference tournament never met criteria for an automatic bid to the NCAA tournament, meaning that the winner of the tournament was never guaranteed an automatic bid to the NCAA tournament. However, Cincinnati, which won all four GMC tournaments, received an at-large bid to the NCAA tournament each year.

== Tournament champions by year ==
Year	Champion	Score	Runner-up	Venue (and city)
1992	Cincinnati	75–63	Memphis State	Chicago Stadium (Chicago, IL)
1993	Cincinnati	77–72	Memphis State	The Pyramid (Memphis, TN)
1994	Cincinnati	68–47	Memphis	Shoemaker Stadium (Cincinnati, OH)
1995	Cincinnati	67–65	Saint Louis	Bradley Center (Milwaukee, WI)

== Championships and finals appearances by school ==
School	Championships	Finals Appearances	Years
Cincinnati	4	4	1992, 1993, 1994, 1995
Memphis	0	3	
Saint Louis	0	1	

== See also ==
- Conference USA men's basketball tournament (from 1996)
