= Larry Harrison (basketball) =

American basketball coach (born 1955)

Biographical details
- Born: February 28, 1955 (age 71); Greenville, North Carolina, U.S.

Playing career
- 1984–1987: Pittsburgh
- Position: Point guard

Coaching career (HC unless noted)
- 1978–1979: Henry Abbott Tech HS (assistant)
- 1982–1984: Thomas Jefferson HS (assistant)
- 1984–1986: Hillsborough CC (assistant)
- 1986–1989: American (assistant)
- 1989–1997: Cincinnati (assistant)
- 1997–2000: DePaul (assistant)
- 2000–2006: Hartford
- 2006–2007: Washington Wizards (scout)
- 2007–2023: West Virginia (assistant)

Head coaching record
- Overall: 67–107 (.385)

Accomplishments and honors

Awards
- America East Coach of the Year (2006)

Larry Harrison (born February 28, 1955) is an American basketball coach who spent 15 seasons from 2007 to 2023 as associate head coach to Bob Huggins at West Virginia University. Harrison was formerly the head men's basketball coach at the University of Hartford. He resigned at the end of the 2006, after a season in which he was named America East Conference Coach of the Year.

== Head coaching record ==
Record table
Season	Team	Overall	Conference	Standing	Postseason
Hartford Hawks (America East Conference) (2000–2006)
2000–01	Hartford	4–24	1–17	10th	
2001–02	Hartford	14–18	10–6	3rd	
2002–03	Hartford	16–13	10–6	3rd	
2003–04	Hartford	12–17	6–12	6th	
2004–05	Hartford	8–20	4–14	10th	
2005–06	Hartford	13–15	8–7	4th	
Hartford:		67–107 (.385)	39–62 (.386)		
Total:		67–107 (.385)			
National champion Postseason invitational champion Conference regular season champion Conference regular season and conference tournament champion Division regular season champion Division regular season and conference tournament champion Conference tournament champion
