= Fifth Third Arena =

Multi-purpose arena in Cincinnati, Ohio

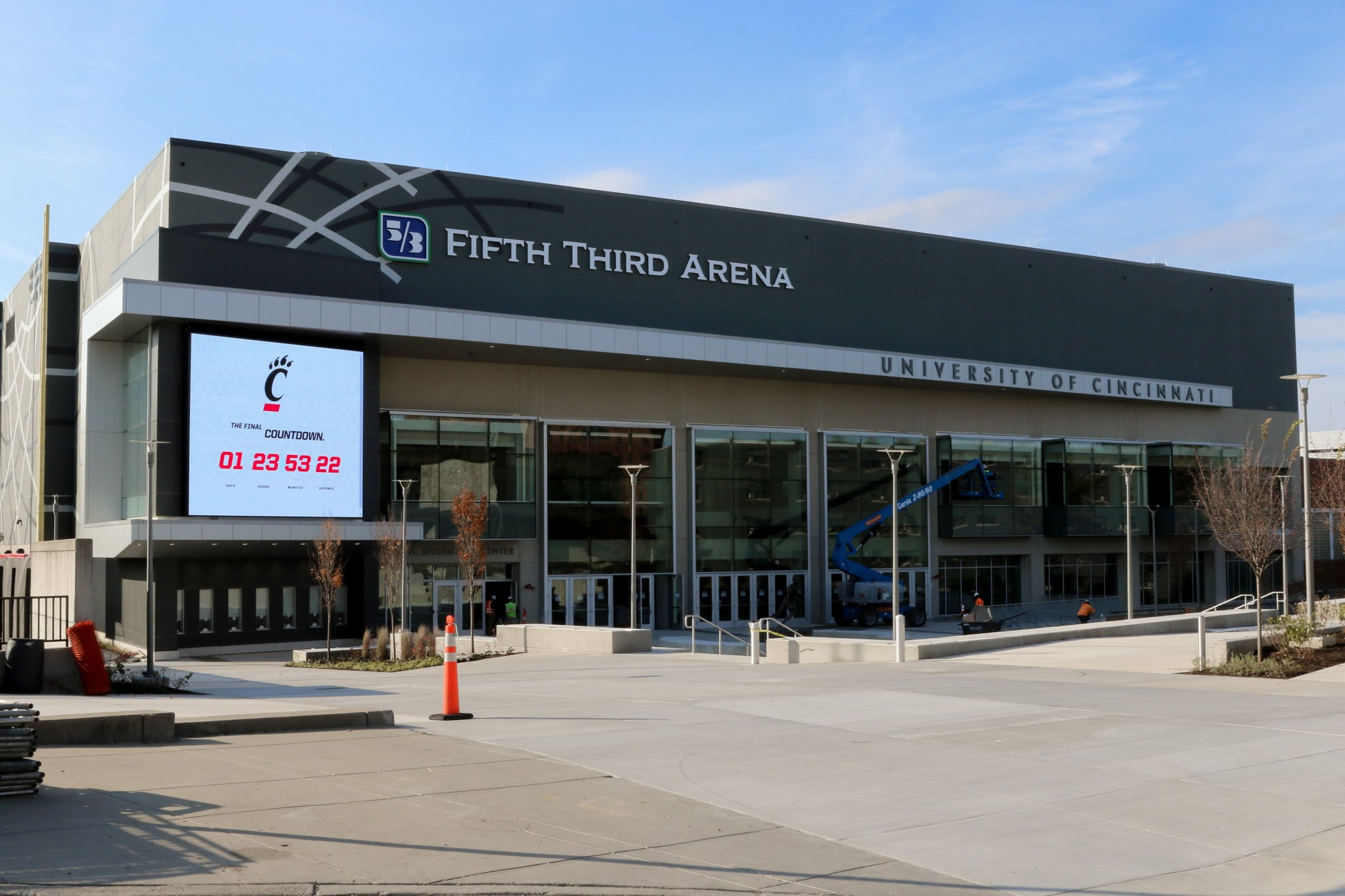
- Interactive map of Fifth Third Arena
- Former names: Myrl H. Shoemaker Center (1989–2005)
- Location: 2700 O' Varsity Way; Cincinnati, Ohio 45221 USA
- Coordinates: 39.131101°N 84.514207°W
- Owner: University of Cincinnati
- Operator: University of Cincinnati
- Capacity: 12,012 (2018–present); 13,187 (2016–2017); 13,176 (1989–2016)
- Surface: All-Star Plus (basketball floor)
- Record attendance: 13,477 (January 26, 2017 vs. Xavier)

Construction
- Groundbreaking: 1987
- Opened: September 12, 1989
- Renovated: 2017–2018
- Cost: US$32 million ($83.1 million in 2025 dollars) 2018 Renovation: US$87 million
- Architect: Moody Nolan
- General contractor: Skanska USA Building Inc.

Tenants
- Cincinnati Bearcats (NCAA); Men's basketball (1989–2017, 2018–present); Women's basketball (1989–2017, 2018–present); Volleyball (1989–2017, 2018–present)

Fifth Third Arena is an indoor arena in Cincinnati, Ohio, United States. The arena opened in 1989 and is located on the campus of the University of Cincinnati. It primarily serves as the home venue for the Cincinnati Bearcats men's basketball, women's basketball, and women's volleyball teams and hosts other events. It is located in the Myrl H. Shoemaker Center, which was also the name of the arena until 2005, when it was named for Cincinnati-based Fifth Third Bank.

== History ==
The building housing the arena is named for Myrl H. Shoemaker, the former lieutenant governor of the state of Ohio. Prior to the building of The Shoe, the Bearcats played off-campus at Riverfront Coliseum (now Heritage Bank Center) and the Cincinnati Gardens. Their previous on-campus arena, Armory Fieldhouse, has been renovated for recreational use, and is located adjacent to the arena to the north.

A new basketball court was installed prior to the 2003–2004 season. It is a similar floor to ones used in the NBA. Like its predecessor, it is named Ed Jucker court, in honor of the coach who led the Bearcats to their two national championships.

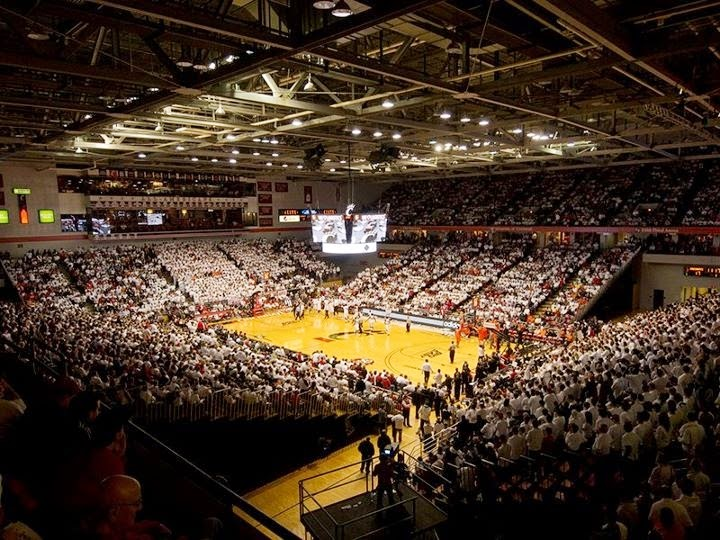
Fifth Third Arena Big East Era

As of the end of the 2019–20 season, the Bearcats are 422–81 (.839) all-time at Fifth Third Arena, including a 42–game win streak from 1997 to 2000. In the 1999–2000 season, every Bearcat home game was sold out. During the Bob Huggins era, it was known as one of the most hostile arenas in the nation due to the high decibel levels typical of his tenure.

== 2018 renovation ==
On October 31, 2014, WLWT reported that the arena could be in line for a $70 million facelift. The project would reduce the amount of seating, but improve visibility in the arena. It would also upgrade club areas, restrooms, and even add a new roof.

On June 23, 2015, WXIX-TV reported the price rose to $80 million. The new capacity would be 10,818. Per the Fifth Third Arena RFQ (Ohio Facilities Construction Commission) Construction was scheduled to start in March 2016 with completion by September 2017. The Bearcats would play games off campus during the 2016–17 season during renovations.

On August 25, 2015, The university officially kicked off the multimillion-dollar fundraising campaign for the renovation. The UC Board of Trustees approved an interim $2.2-million funding request to allow for completion of documents in the design development phase. $15 million has been raised toward the project, an additional $25 million must be raised before the board gives full approval in December. UC teams under the renovation plan would vacate Fifth Third Arena for the 2016–17 season. UC Athletic Director Mike Bohn said that U.S. Bank Arena, Cincinnati Gardens, Cintas Center or Truist Arena are possibilities as a temporary home. No timetable was provided on when a decision would be made on where events will be held. On June 16, 2016, the Port of Greater Cincinnati Development Authority approved a contract to acquire the Cincinnati Gardens for $1.75 million. The arena will be demolished and the 19-acre (7.7 ha) site will be repurposed for future light manufacturing. The sale and imminent demolition of the Cincinnati Gardens eliminated the possibility of the facility being used as a temporary home arena during the renovations of Fifth Third Arena.

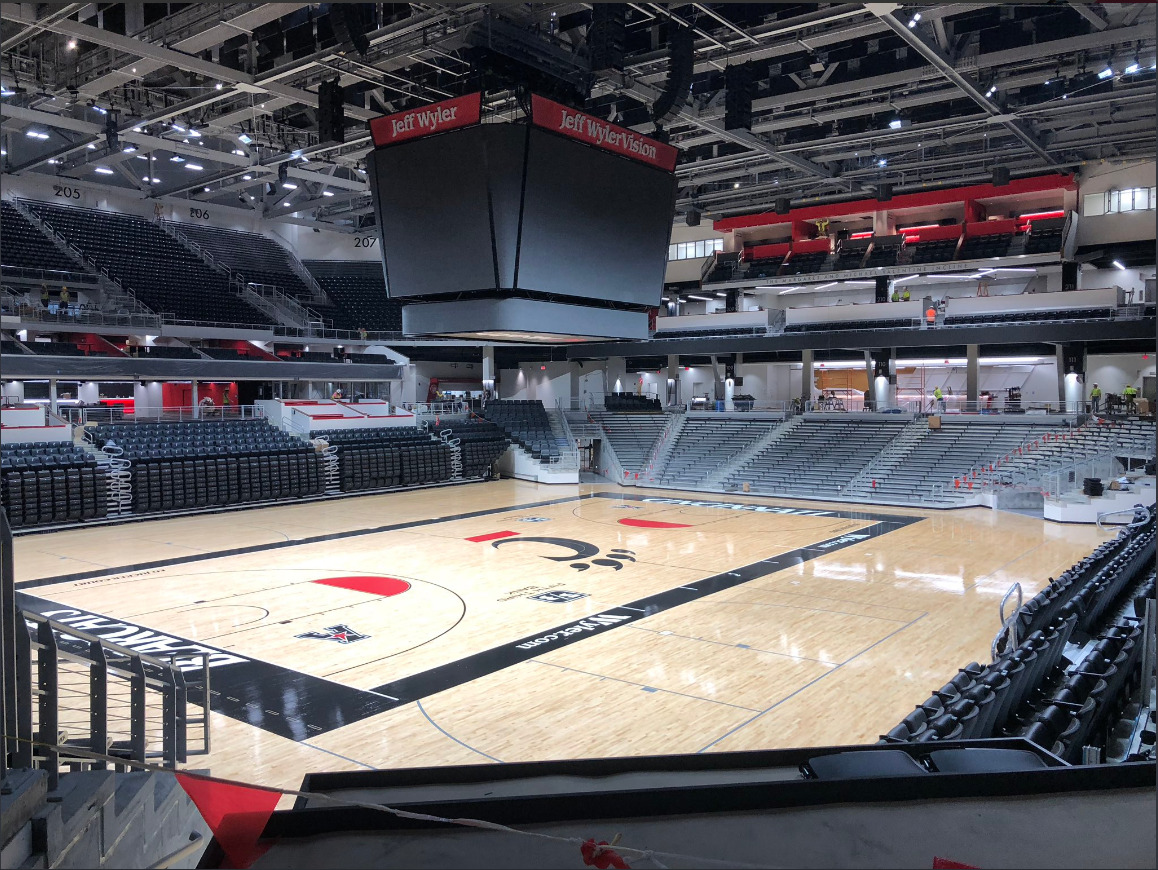
Renovated Fifth Third Arena

On December 15, 2015, the UC Board of Trustees approved an $87-million, privately funded renovation of Fifth Third Arena. Proposed improvements to the facility, include the creation of a 360-degree seating bowl, new HD scoreboard, ribbon boards, sound system, an LED lighting system which will allow for enhanced gameday presentation, new restroom and concession facilities, a new upper-level concourse with its own fan amenities, expanded food and beverage options and a new main entrance and plaza with centralized ticketing and guest services. The renovated arena also would feature upgraded locker room spaces, expanded premium seating options, including a courtside club, arena club and concourse club as well as enclosed suites, loge seating, a new Bearcats Lounge and super suites. During the meeting, trustee Rob Richardson Jr. said the upgraded facility would support the university's objective to join a power athletic conference and in student-athlete recruitment. Construction was set to begin in April 2017 and be completed in fall 2018. Construction was originally scheduled to start in March 2016 with completion by September 2017, but the timeframe was pushed as a result of the project's complexity and pace of fundraising. Lessons learned from the renovation of nearby Nippert Stadium drove a desire not to rush the renovation of 5/3rd Arena, given the uniquely tight quarters of UC's campus.

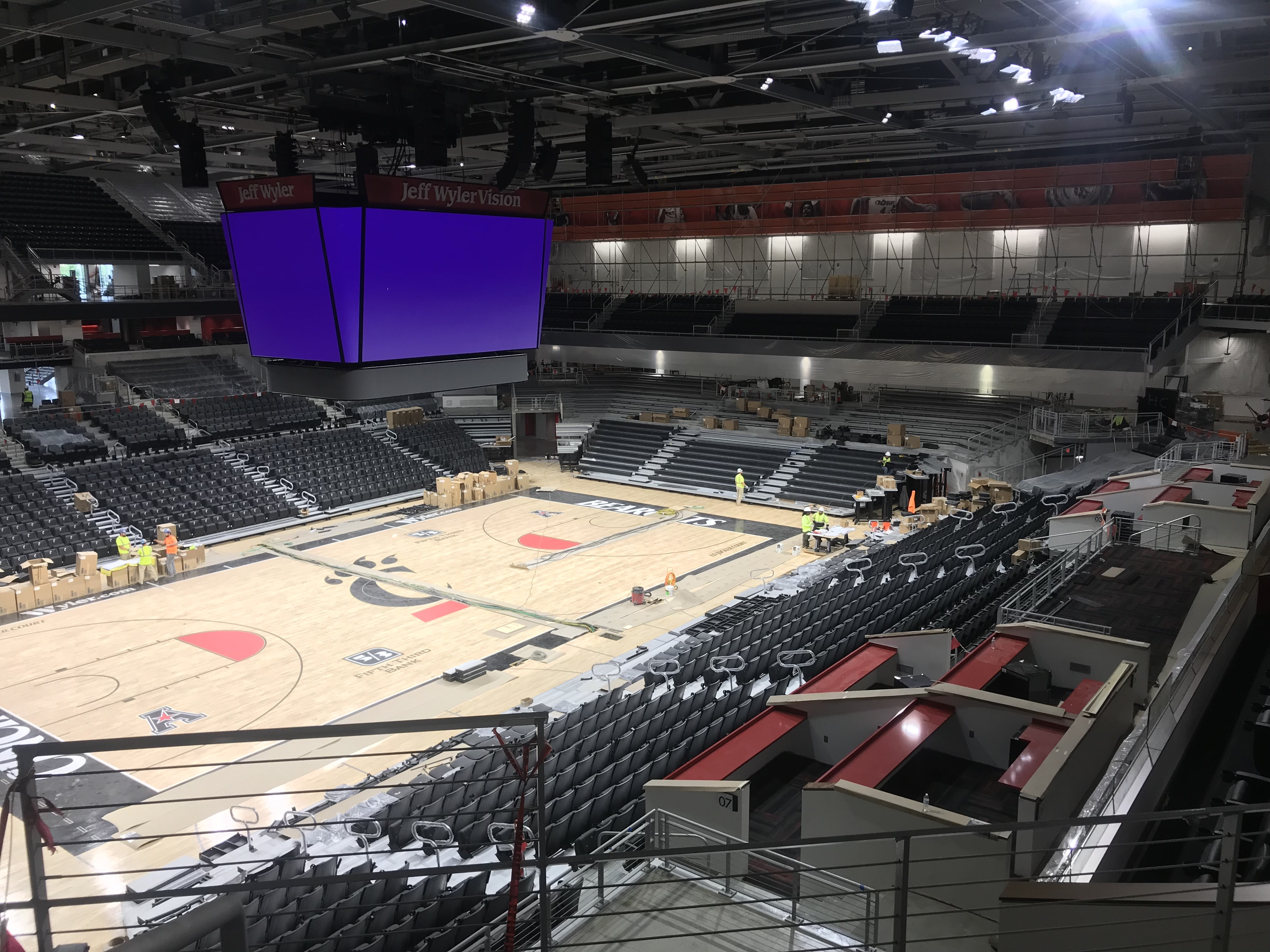
Renovated Fifth Third Arena Interior

A first phase of the renovation was completed prior to the start of the 2016-2017 season, adding four 18-seat luxury suites on the sixth floor of the arena behind the north baseline of the court, which formerly housed the UCATS Club. These suites were used during the 2016-2017 season. Men's and women's basketball and volleyball home events would be conducted off campus during the 2017–18 season while the rest of the renovation was performed. Major renovation work began after the 2016–17 season and is set to be completed by November 2018. On February 10, 2017, the university announced that home men's basketball games would be moved to BB&T Arena on the campus of Northern Kentucky University in Highland Heights, Kentucky during the renovations of Fifth Third Arena. In April 2017, the university announced that the women's basketball and volleyball teams will play their home games in the St. Ursula Academy Gymnasium & Convocation Center near campus.

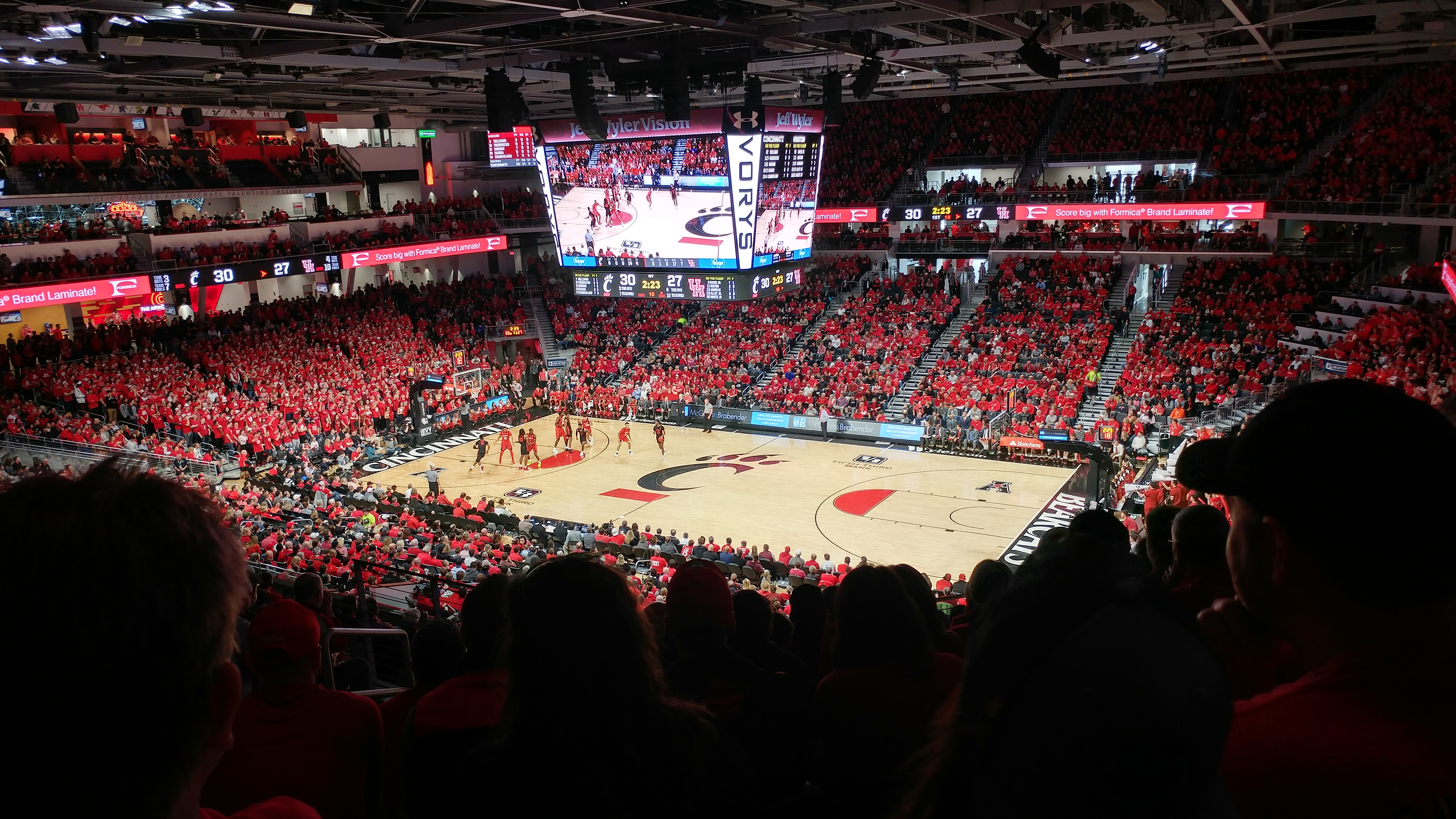
March 10, 2019 hosting Houston

On October 2, 2018, UC announced the array of new concession options for the renovated Fifth Third Arena. This selection included local staple eateries such as Skyline Chili, Taste of Belgium, and Frisch's Big Boy as well as local craft brewery selections at their new in arena bars including Rhinegeist and Madtree Brewing.

On October 24, 2018, ahead of the home opener for the renovated Fifth Third Arena, the University of Cincinnati announced record breaking season ticket sales for the upcoming 2018-2019 season, surpassing the previous record set in the Bob Huggins era with a new benchmark of just under 9000 season tickets sold.

== Sporting events ==
=== Basketball ===
The arena has played host to a handful of tournaments since its construction. The facility has hosted the 1994 Great Midwest Conference men's basketball tournament and the 1998 Conference USA men's basketball tournament, both of which were won by the Bearcats.

The arena has also played host to games of the 1999 and 2003 NCAA Division I women's basketball tournament. The venue also hosted the women's edition of the 1994 Great Midwest Conference Women's Basketball Tournament.

=== Volleyball ===
The facility hosted the 1998 Conference USA volleyball tournament the 2006 Big East volleyball championship, and the 2020 American Athletic Conference volleyball tournament.

=== Other events ===
The Arena also hosted an AEW episode of AEW Dynamite on September 8, 2021, and taped the episode of AEW Rampage for Friday, September 10.

== Home records ==
Through the 2023–24 season, the Bearcats men's basketball team has a record of 463 wins and 102 losses at Fifth Third Arena, a winning percentage of (.819). The Bearcats have finished undefeated in home games on four occasions (1993, 1999, 2002 & 2017). Total Attendance through the 2023-24 is 5,786,854, with the longest win streak in the arena at 44 games (November 30, 1997-February 20, 2000.

Year	Record	Average Attendance
1989–90	10–4	9,273
1990–91	13–4	10,188
1991–92	15–2	10,011
1992–93	14–0	12,238
1993–94	18–2	12,629
1994–95	13–3	13,099
1995–96	13–1	12,719
1996–97	13–2	13,158
1997–98	19–1	11,009
1998–99	14–0	12,977
1999–2000	13–1	13,176
2000–01	11–3	12,906
2001–02	15–0	12,058
2002–03	12–3	12,182
2003–04	14–1	12,237
2004–05	15–2	11,059
2005–06	15–5	9,301
2006–07	9–9	8,831
2007–08	10–7	8,534
2008–09	12–5	7,818
2009–10	12–5	8,076
2010–11	15–3	7,344
2011–12	14–4	8,069
2012–13	13–5	9,253
2013–14	18–1	8,567
2014–15	15–3	9,334
2015–16	14–3	9,415
2016–17	18–0	9,865
2017–18	Arena Closed for Renovation	
2018–19	16–2	11,256
2019–20	13–2	11,100
2020–21	5–5	N/A (COVID-19)
2021–22	12–6	9,273
2022–23	15–3	9,386
2023–24	16–5	9,633
	OVERALL: 463–102 (.819)	10,242

== See also ==
- Fifth Third Field (Toledo, Ohio)
- Fifth Third Field (Dayton, Ohio)
- Fifth Third Ballpark
- List of NCAA Division I basketball arenas
