= Great Midwest Conference =

American NCAA athletic conference (1990–95)

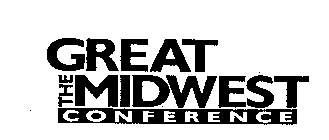
- Association: NCAA
- Founded: 1990
- Folded: 1995
- Commissioner: Michael L. Slive
- Division: Division I
- No. of teams: 7
- Region: Midwestern and Southern United States

Locations
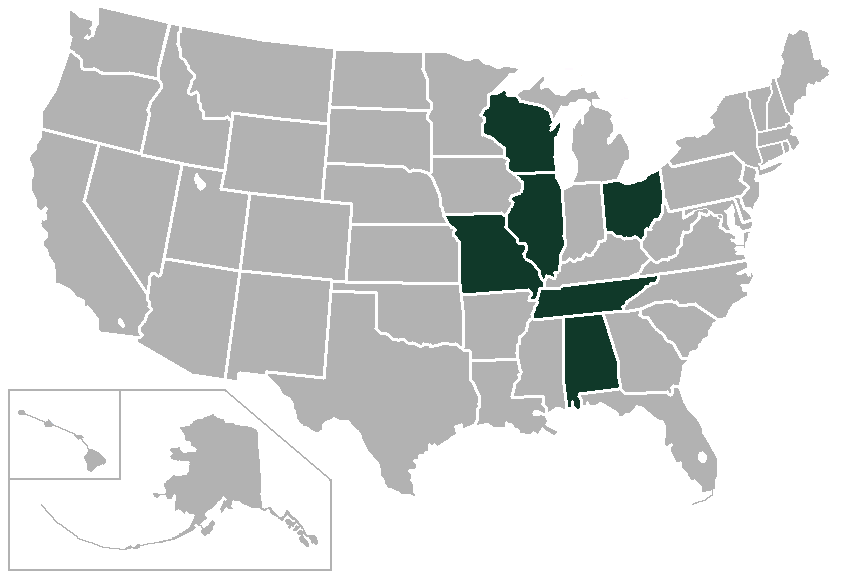

The Great Midwest Conference was an NCAA Division I athletics conference that existed from 1991 to 1995.

== History ==
The conference was formed in 1990 with six members: Cincinnati and Memphis State (now Memphis) from the Metro Conference, UAB from the Sun Belt Conference, Marquette and Saint Louis from the Midwestern Collegiate Conference (now the Horizon League), and independent DePaul. Dayton joined in 1993. Cleveland State and Detroit-Mercy had some interest from coaches, while Louisville and Tulane were heavily favored by athletic directors.

In 1995, six of the schools in the Great Midwest (except for Dayton, who joined the Atlantic 10 Conference) joined with UNC Charlotte, Louisville, Southern Mississippi, Tulane, and South Florida of the Metro and Houston of the dissolving Southwest Conference and formed Conference USA.

=== Chronological timeline ===
- 1990 – The Great Midwest Conference was founded. Charter members included the University of Cincinnati and Memphis State University (now the University of Memphis) from the Metro Conference, the University of Alabama at Birmingham (UAB) from the Sun Belt Conference, Marquette University and Saint Louis University from the Midwestern Collegiate Conference (now the Horizon League), and D-I Independent DePaul University, beginning the 1991–92 academic year.
- 1993 – University of Dayton joined the Great Midwest in the 1993–94 academic year.
- 1995 – The Great Midwest ceased operations as an athletic conference after the 1994–95 academic year; as many schools left to join their respective new home primary conferences, beginning the 1995–96 academic year: Cincinnati, DePaul, Marquette, Memphis, Saint Louis and UAB joined with the Metro Conference schools to form Conference USA (CUSA), while Dayton joined the Atlantic 10 Conference (A-10).

== Member schools ==
=== Final members ===
Institution	Location	Founded	Affiliation	Enrollment	Nickname	Joined (Note: Represents the calendar year when fall sports competition begins.)	Left (Note: Represents the calendar year when spring sports competition ends.)	Subsequent conference(s)	Current conference
University of Cincinnati (Note: Following the July 2013 split of the original Big East Conference into two leagues, DePaul and Marquette moved to the new, non-football conference that retained the Big East name, while Cincinnati remained in the football-sponsoring former conference, now named the American Athletic Conference.)	Cincinnati, Ohio	1819	Public	41,357	Bearcats	1991	1995	various (Note: Cincinnati had joined the following subsequent conferences: Conference USA (CUSA) from 1995–96 to 2004–05; the original Big East Conference from 2005–06 to 2012–13; and the American Athletic Conference (AAC or The American) from 2013–14 to 2022–23.)	Big 12 (2023–present)
University of Dayton (Note: Dayton and Saint Louis are in the Atlantic 10 Conference.)	Dayton, Ohio	1850	Catholic (Marianists)	11,186	Flyers	1993	1995	Atlantic 10 (A10) (1995–present)	
DePaul University	Chicago, Illinois	1898	Catholic (Vicentian)	24,966	Blue Demons	1991	1995	Conf. USA (CUSA) (1995–2005) original Big East (2005–13)	Big East (2013–present)
Marquette University	Milwaukee, Wisconsin	1881	Catholic (Jesuit)	12,002	Golden Eagles	1991	1995	Conf. USA (CUSA) (1995–2005) original Big East (2005–13)	Big East (2013–present)
University of Memphis (Note: At the time of the Big East split, Memphis moved from CUSA to The American.)	Memphis, Tennessee	1912	Public	22,365	Tigers	1991	1995	Conf. USA (CUSA) (1995–2013)	The American (2013–present)
Saint Louis University	St. Louis, Missouri	1818	Catholic (Jesuit)	13,785	Billikens	1991	1995	Conf. USA (CUSA) (1995–2005)	Atlantic 10 (A10) (2005–present)
University of Alabama at Birmingham (UAB)	Birmingham, Alabama	1969	Public	17,999	Blazers	1991	1995	Conf. USA (CUSA) (1995–2023)	The American (2023–present)

== Championships ==
The following were the locations of the GMC men's basketball tournament.

- 1992: Chicago Stadium; Chicago, Illinois
- 1993: The Pyramid; Memphis, Tennessee
- 1994: Shoemaker Center; Cincinnati, Ohio
- 1995: Bradley Center; Milwaukee, Wisconsin

=== Men's basketball ===
Cincinnati won all four years from 1992 to 1995.

=== Women's basketball ===
- 1992: DePaul
- 1993: DePaul
- 1994: UAB
- 1995: Marquette

=== Baseball ===
The Great Midwest also held a baseball tournament for each of its four years to varying coverage.

- 1992: UAB
- 1993: Memphis State
- 1994: UAB
- 1995: Memphis State

== See also ==
- Great Midwest Conference Men's Basketball Player of the Year
