= Iowa State Cyclones men's basketball statistical leaders =

The Iowa State Cyclones men's basketball statistical leaders are individual statistical leaders of the Iowa State Cyclones men's basketball program in various categories, including points, rebounds, assists, three-pointers, steals, and blocks. Within those areas, the lists identify single-game, single-season, and career leaders. The Cyclones represent Iowa State University in the NCAA Division I Big 12 Conference.

Iowa State began competing in intercollegiate basketball in 1908. However, the school's record book does not generally list records from before the 1950s, as records from before this period are often incomplete and inconsistent. Since scoring was much lower in this era, and teams played much fewer games during a typical season, it is likely that few or no players from this era would appear on these lists anyway.

The NCAA did not officially record assists as a stat until the 1983–84 season, and blocks and steals until the 1985–86 season, but Iowa State's record books includes players in these stats before these seasons.

These lists are updated through the end of the 2025–26 season.

== Scoring ==
Career
Rank	Player	Points	Seasons
1	Jeff Grayer	2,502	1984–85 1985–86 1986–87 1987–88
2	Georges Niang	2,228	2012-13 2013-14 2014-15 2015-16
3	Barry Stevens	2,190	1981–82 1982–83 1983–84 1984-85
4	Fred Hoiberg	1,993	1991–92 1992–93 1993–94 1994–95
5	Victor Alexander	1,892	1987–88 1988–89 1989–90 1990–91
6	Marcus Fizer	1,830	1997-98 1998-99 1999-2000
7	Julius Michalik	1,825	1991-92 1992-93 1993-94 1994-95
8	Jake Sullivan	1,810	2000-01 2001-02 2002-03 2003-04
9	Hercle Ivy	1,752	1972-73 1973-74 1974-75 1975-76
10	Justus Thigpen	1,724	1989-90 1990-91 1991-92 1992-93

Season
Rank	Player	Points	Season
1	Marcus Fizer	844	1999-2000
2	Jeff Grayer	811	1987-88
3	Barry Stevens	739	1984-85
4	Hercle Ivy	737	1974-75
5	Victor Alexander	724	1990-91
6	Lafester Rhodes	720	1987-88
7	Georges Niang	718	2015-16
8	Jeff Grayer	684	1985-86
9	Fred Hoiberg	677	1994-95
10	Dedric Willoughby	676	1995-96

Single game
Rank	Player	Points	Season	Opponent
1	Lafester Rhodes	54	1987–88	Iowa
2	Melvin Ejim	48	2013-14	TCU
3	Barry Stevens	47	1984–85	Morgan State
4	Craig Brackins	42	2008-09	Kansas
5	Fred Hoiberg	41	1994-95	Colorado
	Zaid Abdul-Aziz	41	1966-67	USC
7	Barry Stevens	40	1982–83	Missouri
	Gary Thompson	40	1955-56	Vanderbilt
9	Jeff Grayer	39	1986–87	Michigan State
	Zaid Abdul-Aziz	39	1967-68	Nebraska

== Rebounds ==
Career
Rank	Player	Rebounds	Seasons
1	Dean Uthoff	1,233	1976-77 1977-78 1978-79 1979-80
2	Melvin Ejim	1,051	2011-12 2011-12 2012-13 2013-14
3	Zaid Abdul-Aziz	1,025	1965-66 1966-67 1967-68
4	Bill Cain	957	1967-68 1968-69 1969-70
5	Jeff Grayer	910	1984-85 1985-86 1986-87 1987–88
6	Victor Alexander	810	1987-88 1988-89 1989-90 1990–91
7	Jared Homan	777	2001-02 2002-03 2003-04 2004-05
8	Fred Hoiberg	748	1991-92 1992-93 1993-94 1994–95
9	Craig Brackins	736	2007-08 2008-09 2009-10
10	Marcus Fizer	716	1997-98 1998-99 1999-2000

Season
Rank	Player	Rebounds	Season
1	Bill Cain	396	1969-70
2	Dean Uthoff	378	1977-78
3	Zaid Abdul-Aziz	365	1967-68
4	Bill Cain	337	1968-69
5	Zaid Abdul-Aziz	334	1966-67
6	Melvin Ejim	326	2012-13
	Zaid Abdul-Aziz	326	1965-66
8	Royce White	316	2011–12
9	Jackson Vroman	307	2003-04
	Dean Uthoff	307	1978-79

Single game
Rank	Player	Rebounds	Season	Opponent
1	Bill Cain	26	1969-70	Minnesota
2	Jeff Grayer	24	1987-88	U.S. International
	Bill Cain	24	1969-70	Colorado
	Zaid Abdul-Aziz	24	1967-68	Missouri
	Zaid Abdul-Aziz	24	1967-68	Colorado
	Zaid Abdul-Aziz	24	1965-66	Drake
7	Hank Whitney	23	1959-60	Missouri
8	Dean Uthoff	22	1977-78	Drake
	Dean Uthoff	22	1977-78	Colorado
	Steve Burgason	22	1974-75	Mankato State
	Zaid Abdul-Aziz	22	1966-67	Kansas State
	Chuck Duncan	22	1954-55	Kansas
	Hank Whitney	22	1959-60	Colorado

== Assists ==
Career
Rank	Player	Assists	Seasons
1	Monte Morris	768	2013-14 2014-15 2015-16 2016-17
2	Jeff Hornacek	665	1982-83 1983-48 1984-85 1985-86
3	Diante Garrett	611	2007-08 2008-09 2009-10 2010-11
4	Tamin Lipsey	602	2022-23 2023-24 2024-25 2025-26
5	Gary Thompkins	600	1984-85 1985-86 1986-87 1987-88
6	Jacy Holloway	592	1993-94 1994-95 1995-96 1996-97
7	Terry Woods	564	1996-87 1987-88 1988-89 1989-90
8	Will Blalock	464	2003-04 2004-05 2005-06
9	Curtis Stinson	448	2003-04 2004-05 2005-06
10	Jamaal Tinsley	431	1999-2000 2000-01

Season
Rank	Player	Assists	Season
1	Jamaal Tinsley	244	1999-2000
2	Monte Morris	241	2015-16
3	Jeff Hornacek	219	1985-86
4	Monte Morris	241	2016-17
5	DeAndre Kane	213	2013-14
6	Jeff Hornacek	198	1983-84
7	Korie Lucious	195	2012-13
	Diante Garrett	195	2010-11
9	Jamaal Tinsley	187	2000-01
10	Will Blalock	184	2005-06
	Jacy Holloway	184	1996-97

Single game
Rank	Player	Assists	Season	Opponent
1	Tyrese Haliburton	17	2018-19	Southern
2	Eric Heft	16	1973-74	Nebraska
3	Jeff Hornacek	15	1983-84	Iowa
4	Jamaal Tinsley	14	2000-01	Western Carolina
	Ron Bayless	14	1992-93	Nebraska
	Gary Thompkins	14	1987-88	Creighton
	Gary Thompkins	14	1986-87	Oklahoma
	Tyrese Haliburton	14	2019-20	Mississippi Valley State
9	Jamaal Tinsley	13	1999-00	Arkansas State
	Gary Thompkins	13	1987-88	New Mexico
	Jeff Hornacek	13	1985-86	Oklahoma
	Tyrese Hunter	13	2021–22	Baylor

== Three-pointers ==
Career
Rank	Player	3FG	Seasons
1	Jake Sullivan	270	2000–01 2001–02 2002–03 2003–04
2	Naz Mitrou-Long	260	2012-13 2013-14 2014-15 2015-16 2016-17
	Milan Momcilovic	260	2023–24 2024-25 2025-26
4	Matt Thomas	254	2013-14 2014-15 2015-16 2016-17
5	Scott Christopherson	198	2009–10 2010–11 2011–12
6	Georges Niang	188	2012-13 2013-14 2014-15 2015-16
7	Fred Hoiberg	183	1991–92 1992–93 1993–94 1994–95
8	Monté Morris	182	2013-14 2014-15 2015-16 2016-17
9	Curtis Jones	161	2023–24 2024-25
10	Michael Nurse	146	1998–99 1999–2000
	Tyrus McGee	146	2012-13 2012-13

Season
Rank	Player	3FG	Season
1	Milan Momcilovic	136	2025–26
2	Dedric Willoughby	102	1996-97
3	Michael Nurse	99	1999–2000
4	Naz Mitrou-Long	98	2016-17
5	Tyrus McGee	96	2012-13
6	Donovan Jackson	95	2017–18
7	Fred Hoiberg	89	1994–95
	Matt Thomas	89	2015-16
	Matt Thomas	89	2016-17
10	Dedric Willoughby	88	1995-96
	Curtis Jones	88	2024-25

Single game
Rank	Player	3FG	Season	Opponent
1	Lucca Staiger	10	2009–10	Drake
2	Dedric Willoughby	9	1996–97	Kansas
3	11 times by 7 players	8	Most recent: Milan Momcilovic, 2025–26 vs. Arizona	

== Steals ==
Career
Rank	Player	Steals	Seasons
1	Tamin Lipsey	314	2022-23 2023-24 2024-25 2025-26
2	Jeff Hornacek	211	1982-83 1983-48 1984-85 1985-86
3	Justus Thigpen	210	1989-90 1990-91 1991-92 1992-93
4	Fred Hoiberg	207	1991-92 1992-93 1993-94 1994–95
5	Curtis Stinson	200	2003-04 2004-05 2005-06
6	Jeff Grayer	199	1984-85 1985-86 1986-87 1987–88
7	Will Blalock	177	2003-04 2004-05 2005-06
	Jamaal Tinsley	177	1999-2000 2000-01
9	Monte Morris	172	2013-14 2014-15 2015-16 2016-17
10	Ron Harris	169	1980-81 1981-82 1982-83 1983-84

Season
Rank	Player	Steals	Season
1	Jamaal Tinsley	98	1999-2000
2	Tamin Lipsey	96	2023-24
3	Jamaal Tinsley	79	2000-01
4	Tamin Lipsey	77	2025-26
5	Keshon Gilbert	74	2023-24
	Joshua Jefferson	74	2024-25
7	Curtis Stinson	73	2005-06
	Tamin Lipsey	73	2022-23
9	Curtis Stinson	72	2004-05
	Justus Thigpen	72	1992-93

Single game
Rank	Player	Steals	Season	Opponent
1	Tamin Lipsey	8	2023-24	Prairie View A&M
	Joshua Jefferson	8	2024-25	Colorado
	Keshon Gilbert	8	2024-25	BYU
4	Justus Thigpen	7	1992-93	Kansas
	Fred Hoiberg	7	1991-92	American
	Curtis Jones	7	2023-24	TCU
	Joshua Jefferson	7	2024-25	Houston
8	Tamin Lipsey	6	2025-26	Arizona State
	Keshon Gilbert	6	2023-24	Kansas State
	Jake Anderson	6	2010-11	Cal
	Curtis Stinson	6	2005-06	Kansas
	Will Blalock	6	2005-06	Ohio State
	Curtis Stinson	6	2004-05	Xavier
	Jamaal Tinsley	6	2000-01	Kansas
	Jamaal Tinsley	6	2000-01	Colorado
	Stevie Johnson	6	1999-2000	Oklahoma State
	Jamaal Tinsley	6	1999-2000	Idaho State
	Kenny Pratt	6	1995-96	Oklahoma State
	Justus Thigpen	6	1992-93	Southern Utah
	Ron Bayless	6	1992-93	Oklahoma State
	Ron Bayless	6	1992-93	Bethune–Cookman
	Justus Thigpen	6	1991-92	Missouri
	Ron Bayless	6	1991-92	Drake
	Howard Eaton	6	1991-92	Omaha
	Ron Virgil	6	1985-86	Colorado
	Gary Thompkins	6	1985-86	Colorado
	Jeff Grayer	6	1985-86	South Dakota State
	Dean Uthoff	6	1978-79	Northwest Missouri State

== Blocks ==
Career
Rank	Player	Blocks	Seasons
1	Jared Homan	235	2001-02 2002-03 2003-04 2004-05
2	Kelvin Cato	189	1995-96 1996-97
3	Loren Meyer	134	1991-92 1992-93 1993-94 1994-95
4	George Conditt IV	128	2018-19 2019-20 2020-21 2021-22
5	Victor Alexander	120	1987-88 1988-89 1989-90 1990–91
6	Sam Hill	115	1983-84 1984-85 1985-86 1986-87
7	Jameel McKay	114	2014-15 2015-16
8	Rahshon Clark	109	2004-05 2005-06 2006-07 2007-08
9	Craig Brackins	99	2007-08 2008-09 2009-10
10	Cameron Lard	92	2017-18 2018-19

Season
Rank	Player	Blocks	Season
1	Kelvin Cato	118	1996-97
2	Jared Homan	73	2003-04
3	Kelvin Cato	71	1995-96
4	Jared Homan	64	2004-05
5	Cameron Lard	63	2017-18
6	Jameel McKay	59	2014-15
7	Jared Homan	58	2002-03
8	Jameel McKay	55	2015-16
9	Victor Alexander	51	1990-91
10	Loren Meyer	50	1994-95
	George Conditt IV	50	2019-20

Single game
Rank	Player	Blocks	Season	Opponent
1	Kelvin Cato	11	1996-97	UT-Pan American
2	Jackson Vroman	8	2002-03	Nebraska
	Kelvin Cato	8	1996-97	Illinois State
	Kelvin Cato	8	1996-97	Texas Tech
	Kelvin Cato	8	1996-97	Kansas State
6	Jared Homan	7	2004-05	Minnesota
	Jared Homan	7	2003-04	Texas A&M
	Kelvin Cato	7	1996-97	Nebraska
	Kelvin Cato	7	1996-97	Missouri
	Kelvin Cato	7	1996-97	Marquette
