= 2015–16 Iowa State Cyclones men's basketball team =

American college basketball season

2015–16 Iowa State Cyclones men's basketball

Emerald Coast Classic champions

NCAA tournament, Sweet Sixteen
- Conference: Big 12 Conference

Ranking
- Coaches: No. 15
- AP: No. 22
- Record: 23–12 (10–8 Big 12)
- Head coach: Steve Prohm (1st season)
- Assistant coaches: T. J. Otzelberger (8th season); Daniyal Robinson; William Small
- Home arena: Hilton Coliseum

2015–16 Big 12 men's basketball standings
	Conf.				Overall
Team	W		L	PCT	W		L	PCT
No. 1 Kansas †	15	–	3	.833	33	–	5	.868
No. 8 West Virginia	13	–	5	.722	26	–	9	.743
No. 7 Oklahoma	12	–	6	.667	29	–	8	.784
Texas	11	–	7	.611	20	–	13	.606
No. 21 Baylor	10	–	8	.556	22	–	12	.647
No. 22 Iowa State	10	–	8	.556	23	–	12	.657
Texas Tech	9	–	9	.500	19	–	13	.594
Kansas State	5	–	13	.278	17	–	16	.515
Oklahoma State	3	–	15	.167	12	–	20	.375
TCU	2	–	16	.111	12	–	21	.364
† 2016 Big 12 Tournament winner Rankings from AP poll

The 2015–16 Iowa State Cyclones men's basketball team represented Iowa State University during the 2015–16 NCAA Division I men's basketball season. The Cyclones were coached by Steve Prohm, who was in his first season. They played their home games at Hilton Coliseum in Ames, Iowa and competed in the Big 12 Conference.

They finished the season 23–12 10–8 in Big 12 play to finish tied for 5th place. They lost to Oklahoma in the quarterfinals of the Big 12 Conference tournament. They received an at-large bid to the NCAA tournament, where they defeated Iona and Little Rock to advance to the Sweet Sixteen, where they lost to Virginia.

== Previous season ==
Iowa State finished the season 25–9, 12–6 in Big 12 play to finish in second place. They defeated Texas, Oklahoma, and Kansas to become champions of the Big 12 Conference tournament to earn an automatic bid to the NCAA tournament. In the NCAA Tournament they were upset by UAB in the second round.

After months of speculation, it was announced on June 2, 2015, that Fred Hoiberg would be accepting the head coach position with the Chicago Bulls of the NBA.

On June 8, 2015, it was announced that Iowa State would be hiring Murray State head coach Steve Prohm for the same position.

=== Offseason departures ===
Offseason departures
Name	Position	Reason
Bryce Dejean-Jones	Guard	Graduated
Dustin Hogue	Forward	Graduated
Daniel Edozie	Forward	Graduated
Sherron Dorsey-Walker	Guard	Transferred to Oakland
Kourtlin Jackson	Guard	Transferred to Southern Miss
Clayton Custer	Guard	Transferred to Loyola Chicago
Daniel Stensland	Guard	Left basketball team
Georgios Tsalmpouris	Center	Left to play professionally in the Greek Basketball League

== Recruiting ==
=== Prep recruits ===
College recruiting
Name	Hometown	School	Height	Weight	Commit date
Nick Noskowiak; PG	Sun Prairie, Wisconsin	Sun Prairie	6 ft 2 in (1.88 m)	180 lb (82 kg)	Apr 26, 2015
Nick Noskowiak; PG	Recruit ratings: Scout: Rivals: 247Sports: ESPN: (84)				
Brady Ernst; PF	Clinton, Iowa	Clinton	6 ft 8 in (2.03 m)	200 lb (91 kg)	Jun 25, 2015
Brady Ernst; PF	Recruit ratings: Scout: Rivals: 247Sports: ESPN: (NR)				
Simeon Carter; PF	Charlotte, North Carolina	West Charlotte	6 ft 7 in (2.01 m)	200 lb (91 kg)	Aug 6, 2015
Simeon Carter; PF	Recruit ratings: Scout: Rivals: 247Sports: ESPN: (NR)				
Overall recruit ranking: 247Sports: 75
Note: In many cases, Scout, Rivals, 247Sports, On3, and ESPN may conflict in their listings of height and weight.; In these cases, the average was taken. ESPN grades are on a 100-point scale.; Sources: "Iowa State 2015 Basketball Commitments". Rivals.; "2015 Iowa State Basketball Commits". Scout.; "ESPN". ESPN.; "Scout.com Team Recruiting Rankings". Scout.; "2015 Team Ranking". Rivals.

=== Incoming transfers ===
Incoming transfers
Name	Position	Hometown	Previous school	Remaining eligibility	Notes
Jordan Ashton	Guard	Mount Pleasant, Iowa	Kirkwood CC	2	Ashton was eligible to play immediately.
Nick Weiler-Babb	Guard	Arlington, Texas	Arkansas	3	Weiler-Babb sat out the 2015–16 season due to NCAA eligibility rules.

== Roster ==
2015–16 Iowa State Cyclones men's basketball team
Players
Coaches

Pos.	#	Name	Height	Weight	Year	Previous school	Hometown
F	00	Simeon Carter	6 ft 8 in (2.03 m)	215 lb (98 kg)	Fr	West Charlotte	Charlotte, North Carolina
C	1	Jameel McKay	6 ft 9 in (2.06 m)	225 lb (102 kg)	RS Sr	Pulaski; Indian Hills CC; Marquette	Milwaukee
F	2	Abdel Nader	6 ft 6 in (1.98 m)	225 lb (102 kg)	RS Sr	Niles North; Northern Illinois	Skokie, Illinois
G	3	Hallice Cooke	6 ft 3 in (1.91 m)	190 lb (86 kg)	RS So	St. Anthony; Oregon State	Union City, New Jersey
G	4	Wesley Greder (W)	6 ft 5 in (1.96 m)	185 lb (84 kg)	Fr	Gilbert High School	Gilbert, Iowa
G	11	Monté Morris	6 ft 3 in (1.91 m)	175 lb (79 kg)	Jr	Beecher	Flint, Michigan
G	14	Nick Weiler-Babb (redshirt)	6 ft 5 in (1.96 m)	205 lb (93 kg)	RS So	James Martin; Arkansas	Arlington, Texas
G	15	Naz Long (injured) (C)	6 ft 4 in (1.93 m)	210 lb (95 kg)	Sr	Findlay Prep	Mississauga, Ontario
G	21	Matt Thomas	6 ft 4 in (1.93 m)	197 lb (89 kg)	Jr	Onalaska	Onalaska, Wisconsin
G	23	Jordan Ashton	6 ft 4 in (1.93 m)	195 lb (88 kg)	RS Jr	Mount Pleasant; Northwest Missouri State; Kirkwood CC	Mount Pleasant, Iowa
C	24	Stuart Nezlek (W)	6 ft 10 in (2.08 m)	245 lb (111 kg)	Jr	Fenwick	Oak Park, Illinois
G	30	Deonte Burton	6 ft 4 in (1.93 m)	250 lb (113 kg)	RS Jr	Vincent; Marquette	Milwaukee
F	31	Georges Niang (C)	6 ft 8 in (2.03 m)	230 lb (104 kg)	Sr	Tilton School	Methuen, Massachusetts
PF	33	Brady Ernst (injured) (redshirt)	6 ft 9 in (2.06 m)	215 lb (98 kg)	RS Fr	Clinton	Clinton, Iowa

Head coach

- Steve Prohm (Iowa State)

Assistant coach(es)

- T. J. Otzelberger
- William Small
- Daniyal Robinson

Legend

- (C) Team captain
- (S) Suspended
- (I) Ineligible
- (W) Walk-on
- Injured
- Current redshirt

Roster

== Schedule and results ==
Date time, TV	Rank^{#}	Opponent^{#}	Result	Record	High points	High rebounds	High assists	Site (attendance) city, state
Exhibition
November 6, 2015*; 7:00 pm, Cyclones.tv	No. 7	Grand Valley State	W 106–60		20 – Mitrou-Long	11 – McKay	8 – Thomas	Hilton Coliseum (14,384); Ames, Iowa
Regular season
November 13, 2015*; 4:00 pm, ESPN2	No. 7	vs. Colorado	W 68–62	1–0	17 – Niang	10 – McKay	4 – Morris	Sanford Pentagon (3,200); Sioux Falls, South Dakota
November 16, 2015*; 7:00 pm, Cyclones.tv	No. 7	Chicago State; Emerald Coast Classic	W 106–64	2–0	25 – McKay	11 – Tied	8 – Tied	Hilton Coliseum (14,111); Ames, Iowa
November 23, 2015*; 7:00 pm, Cyclones.tv	No. 4	Chattanooga; Emerald Coast Classic	W 83–63	3–0	24 – Mitrou-Long	17 – McKay	10 – Morris	Hilton Coliseum (13,305); Ames, Iowa
November 27, 2015*; 6:00 pm, CBSSN	No. 4	vs. Virginia Tech; Emerald Coast Classic; Semifinals	W 99–77	4–0	23 – McKay	11 – Nader	7 – Morris	The Arena (2,222); Niceville, Florida
November 28, 2015*; 6:00 pm, CBSSN	No. 4	vs. Illinois; Emerald Coast Classic; Championship	W 84–73	5–0	23 – Niang	9 – Morris	6 – Morris	The Arena (2,222); Niceville, Florida
December 1, 2015*; 7:00 pm, Cyclones.tv	No. 5	North Dakota State	W 84–64	6–0	21 – Nader	19 – McKay	6 – Morris	Hilton Coliseum (14,272); Ames, Iowa
December 7, 2015*; 8:00 pm, ESPNU	No. 4	Buffalo	W 84–63	7–0	31 – Niang	12 – Niang	10 – Morris	Hilton Coliseum (14,130); Ames, Iowa
December 11, 2015*; 6:30 pm, ESPN2	No. 4	Iowa; Iowa Corn Cy-Hawk Series	W 83–82	8–0	20 – Tied	12 – McKay	9 – Morris	Hilton Coliseum (14,384); Ames, Iowa
December 13, 2015*; 5:00 pm, Cyclones.tv	No. 4	Arkansas–Pine Bluff	W 78–64	9–0	18 – McKay	8 – McKay	11 – Morris	Hilton Coliseum (14,284); Ames, Iowa
December 19, 2015*; 6:00 pm, ESPNU	No. 5	vs. Northern Iowa; Big Four Classic	L 79–81	9–1	30 – Niang	7 – Nader	6 – Morris	Wells Fargo Arena; Des Moines, Iowa
December 22, 2015*; 6:00 pm, ESPN2	No. 11	at No. 22 Cincinnati	W 81–79	10–1	24 – Niang	10 – Niang	7 – Morris	Fifth Third Arena (13,176); Cincinnati
December 30, 2015*; 7:00 pm, Cyclones.tv	No. 11	Coppin State	W 104–84	11–1	21 – Nader	9 – Niang	11 – Morris	Hilton Coliseum (14,384); Ames, Iowa
January 2, 2016; 6:00 pm, ESPN2	No. 11	at No. 3 Oklahoma	L 83–87	11–2 (0–1)	29 – Niang	9 – McKay	3 – Morris	Lloyd Noble Center (11,251); Norman, Oklahoma
January 6, 2016; 8:00 pm, ESPNU	No. 13	Texas Tech	W 76–69	12–2 (1–1)	19 – McKay	14 – McKay	6 – Morris	Hilton Coliseum (14,384); Ames, Iowa
January 9, 2016; 2:00 pm, ESPN2	No. 13	Baylor	L 89–94	12–3 (1–2)	22 – Niang	8 – Nader	6 – Niang	Hilton Coliseum (14,384); Ames, Iowa
January 12, 2016; 8:00 pm, ESPN2	No. 17	at Texas	L 91–94 ^{OT}	12–4 (1–3)	27 – Niang	16 – Nader	7 – Morris	Frank Erwin Center (10,663); Austin, Texas
January 16, 2016; 3:00 pm, ESPNU	No. 17	at Kansas State	W 76–63	13–4 (2–3)	19 – Morris	6 – 3 tied	4 – Morris	Bramlage Coliseum (12,462); Manhattan, Kansas
January 18, 2016; 8:00 pm, ESPN	No. 19	No. 1 Oklahoma	W 82–77	14–4 (3–3)	22 – Niang	13 – McKay	3 – Tied	Hilton Coliseum (14,384); Ames, Iowa
January 23, 2016; 3:00 pm, ESPNU	No. 19	at TCU	W 73–60	15–4 (4–3)	18 – Morris	10 – McKay	6 – Morris	Schollmaier Arena (6,014); Fort Worth, Texas
January 25, 2016; 8:00 pm, ESPN	No. 14	No. 4 Kansas	W 85–72	16–4 (5–3)	21 – Morris	5 – Tied	9 – Morris	Hilton Coliseum (14,384); Ames, Iowa
January 30, 2016*; 1:00 pm, ESPN	No. 14	at No. 5 Texas A&M; Big 12/SEC Challenge	L 62–72	16–5	15 – Niang	14 – McKay	6 – Morris	Reed Arena (12,473); College Station, Texas
February 2, 2016; 8:00 pm, ESPN2	No. 13	No. 14 West Virginia	L 76–81	16–6 (5–4)	20 – Niang	6 – Burton	10 – Morris	Hilton Coliseum (14,384); Ames, Iowa
February 6, 2016; 1:00 pm, ESPN2	No. 13	at Oklahoma State	W 64–59	17–6 (6–4)	18 – Niang	9 – Niang	8 – Morris	Gallagher-Iba Arena (6,561); Stillwater, Oklahoma
February 10, 2016; 8:00 pm, ESPNU	No. 14	at Texas Tech	L 82–85 ^{OT}	17–7 (6–5)	20 – Burton	9 – Niang	9 – Morris	United Supermarkets Arena (6,715); Lubbock, Texas
February 13, 2016; 7:30 pm, ESPN	No. 14	No. 24 Texas	W 85–75	18–7 (7–5)	24 – Morris	8 – Nader	3 – Tied	Hilton Coliseum (14,384); Ames, Iowa
February 16, 2016; 8:00 pm, ESPN2	No. 13	at No. 25 Baylor	L 91–100 ^{OT}	18–8 (7–6)	26 – Niang	8 – Niang	11 – Morris	Ferrell Center (5,556); Waco, Texas
February 20, 2016; 6:30 pm, ESPNU	No. 13	TCU	W 92–83	19–8 (8–6)	27 – Niang	14 – Burton	11 – Morris	Hilton Coliseum (14,384); Ames, Iowa
February 22, 2016; 8:00 pm, ESPN	No. 17	at No. 14 West Virginia	L 87–97	19–9 (8–7)	23 – Nader	5 – Tied	5 – Niang	WVU Coliseum (10,683); Morgantown, West Virginia
February 27, 2016; 5:00 pm, ESPN2	No. 17	Kansas State	W 80–61	20–9 (9–7)	20 – Thomas	17 – McKay	8 – Morris	Hilton Coliseum (14,384); Ames, Iowa
February 29, 2016; 6:00 pm, ESPNU	No. 21	Oklahoma State	W 58–50	21–9 (10–7)	19 – Nader	10 – Tied	6 – Morris	Hilton Coliseum (14,383); Ames, Iowa
March 5, 2016; 3:00 pm, ESPN	No. 21	at No. 1 Kansas	L 78–85	21–10 (10–8)	22 – Niang	9 – McKay	5 – Niang	Allen Fieldhouse (16,300); Lawrence, Kansas
Big 12 Tournament
03/10/2016; 8:00 pm, ESPNU	(6) No. 21	vs. (3) No. 6 Oklahoma; Quarterfinals	L 76–79	21–11	31 – Niang	9 – Tied	5 – Niang	Sprint Center (18,972); Kansas City, Missouri
NCAA Tournament
03/17/2016*; 1:00 pm, TBS	(4 MW) No. 22	vs. (13 MW) Iona; First Round	W 94–81	22–11	28 – Niang	9 – McKay	8 – Morris	Pepsi Center (19,499); Denver, Colorado
03/19/2016*; 5:10 pm, TBS	(4 MW) No. 22	vs. (12 MW) Little Rock; Second Round	W 78–61	23–11	28 – Niang	10 – McKay	4 – Tied	Pepsi Center (19,551); Denver, Colorado
03/25/2016*; 6:10 pm, CBS	(4 MW) No. 22	vs. (1 MW) No. 4 Virginia; Sweet Sixteen	L 71–84	23–12	30 – Niang	8 – Niang	8 – Morris	United Center (21,490); Chicago
*Non-conference game. ^{#}Rankings from AP poll. (#) Tournament seedings in parentheses. All times are in Central Time.

== Rankings ==
Ranking movements Legend: ██ Increase in ranking ██ Decrease in ranking
	Week																				
Poll	Pre	1	2	3	4	5	6	7	8	9	10	11	12	13	14	15	16	17	18	19	Final
AP poll	7	7	7	4	5	4	5	11	11	13	17	19	14	13	14	13	17	21	21	22	
Coaches Poll	7	7	7	5	4	2	2	9	9	14	18	21	16	14	15	15	17	20	19	19	15

== Awards and honors ==
- All-Americans

Georges Niang (2nd Team)

- Senior CLASS All-American

Georges Niang

- Big 12 Newcomer of the Year

Deonte Burton

- Academic All-Big 12 First Team

Matt Thomas (basketball)

- All-Conference Selections

Georges Niang (1st Team)
Monté Morris (1st Team)
Jameel McKay (Honorable Mention)
Abdel Nader (Honorable Mention)
Matt Thomas (Honorable Mention)

- Big 12 Player of the Week

Monté Morris (November 29)
Jameel McKay (December 13)
Monté Morris (January 24)
