= Georges Niang =

American basketball player (born 1993)

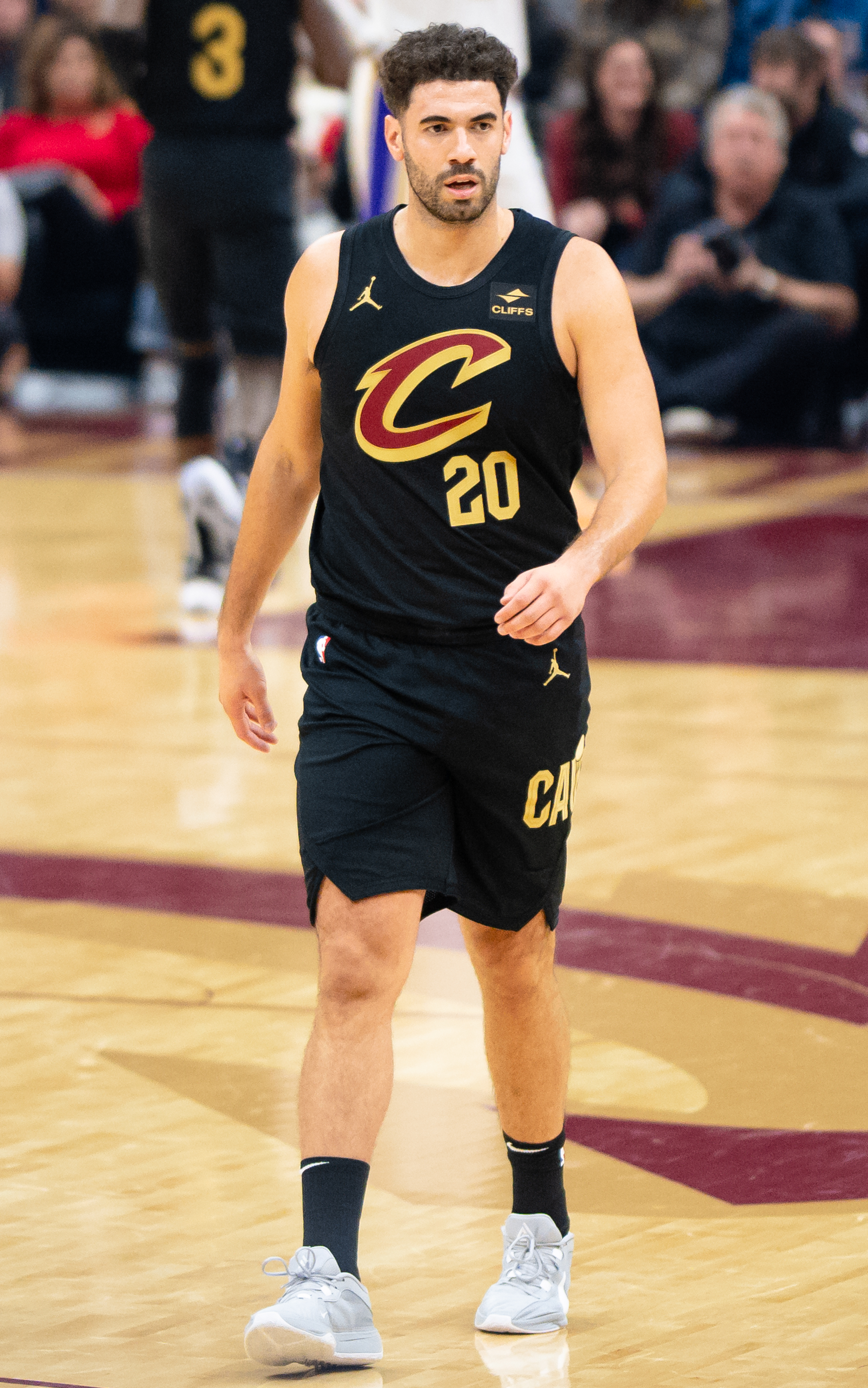
- Niang with the Cleveland Cavaliers in 2023

No. 32 – Golden State Warriors
- Position: Power forward
- League: NBA

Personal information
- Born: June 17, 1993 (age 33) Lawrence, Massachusetts, U.S.
- Listed height: 6 ft 7 in (2.01 m)
- Listed weight: 245 lb (111 kg)

Career information
- High school: Tilton School (Tilton, New Hampshire)
- College: Iowa State (2012–2016)
- NBA draft: 2016: 2nd round, 50th overall pick
- Drafted by: Indiana Pacers
- Playing career: 2016–present

Career history
- 2016–2017: Indiana Pacers
- 2016–2017: →Fort Wayne Mad Ants
- 2017–2018: Santa Cruz Warriors
- 2018–2021: Utah Jazz
- 2018: →Salt Lake City Stars
- 2021–2023: Philadelphia 76ers
- 2023–2025: Cleveland Cavaliers
- 2025: Atlanta Hawks
- 2026–present: Golden State Warriors

Career highlights
- All-NBA G League First Team (2018); Consensus second-team All-American (2016); Third-team All-American – AP, NABC (2015); Karl Malone Award (2016); 2× First-team All-Big 12 (2015, 2016); Third-team All-Big 12 (2014); Big 12 All-Rookie team (2013); Big 12 tournament MVP (2015)
- Stats at NBA.com
- Stats at Basketball Reference

Georges Maguette Niang (/ˈniːæŋ/ NEE-ang; born June 17, 1993), nicknamed "the Minivan" and "G Wagon" is an American professional basketball player for the Golden State Warriors of the National Basketball Association (NBA). He was an All-American college player for the Iowa State Cyclones.

== Early life ==
Niang is the son of Sidy and Alison Niang. His father was born and raised in Senegal. He was elected student body president at the Tilton School.

== High school career ==
A three-year starter and two-year team captain, Niang capped off his career as one of the greatest players in the Tilton School history, amassing a school-record 2,372 points. He was a three-time First-Team All-NEPSAC Class AA pick, Niang was the 2012 NEPSAC Class AA Player of the Year. He averaged 25.1 points, 7.2 rebounds, and 2.1 assists per game as a senior, averaged 24.2 points and 8.2 rebounds as a junior and led his team to the 2011 NEPSAC Class AA championship with a 72–56 win over St. Mark's. He was named outstanding player of the tournament, scoring 23 points on 11-of-11 shooting from the field in the championship game. His team lost in the 2011 National Prep Championship to Notre Dame Prep (87–85), as Niang scored 31 points. He played for the Boston-based BABC AAU team, the same program that featured former Cyclone and NBA player Will Blalock. His BABC squad won the 2011 Nike Peach Jam, one of the most competitive AAU tournaments in the country. He was teammates at Tilton and in AAU with Nerlens Noel, they won four NEPSAC titles, one national prep championship, one AAU national championship and one Nike EYBL title in his career.

Niang was considered one of the best players on the East Coast, ending his prep career as a consensus national top-100 recruit. He was ranked No. 42 by Lindy's, No. 56 by ESPNU, No. 69 by Scout.com, No. 69 by Rivals.com, No. 73 by The Sporting News, and No. 81 by CBS Sports in the 2012 prep national rankings. He also had offers from Iowa, Providence, Texas A&M and Seton Hall, eventually committing to Iowa State.

College recruiting
Name	Hometown	School	Height	Weight	Commit date
Georges Niang; F	Methuen, MA	Tilton School (NH)	6 ft 8 in (2.03 m)	210 lb (95 kg)	May 5, 2011
Georges Niang; F	Recruit ratings: Scout: Rivals: 247Sports: ESPN:				
Overall recruit ranking: Rivals: 6, 16 (F) ESPN: 56, 2 (NH), 14 (F)
Note: In many cases, Scout, Rivals, 247Sports, On3, and ESPN may conflict in their listings of height and weight.; In these cases, the average was taken. ESPN grades are on a 100-point scale.; Sources: "Iowa State 2012 Basketball Commitments". Rivals.; "ESPN". ESPN.; "2012 Team Ranking". Rivals.

== College career ==
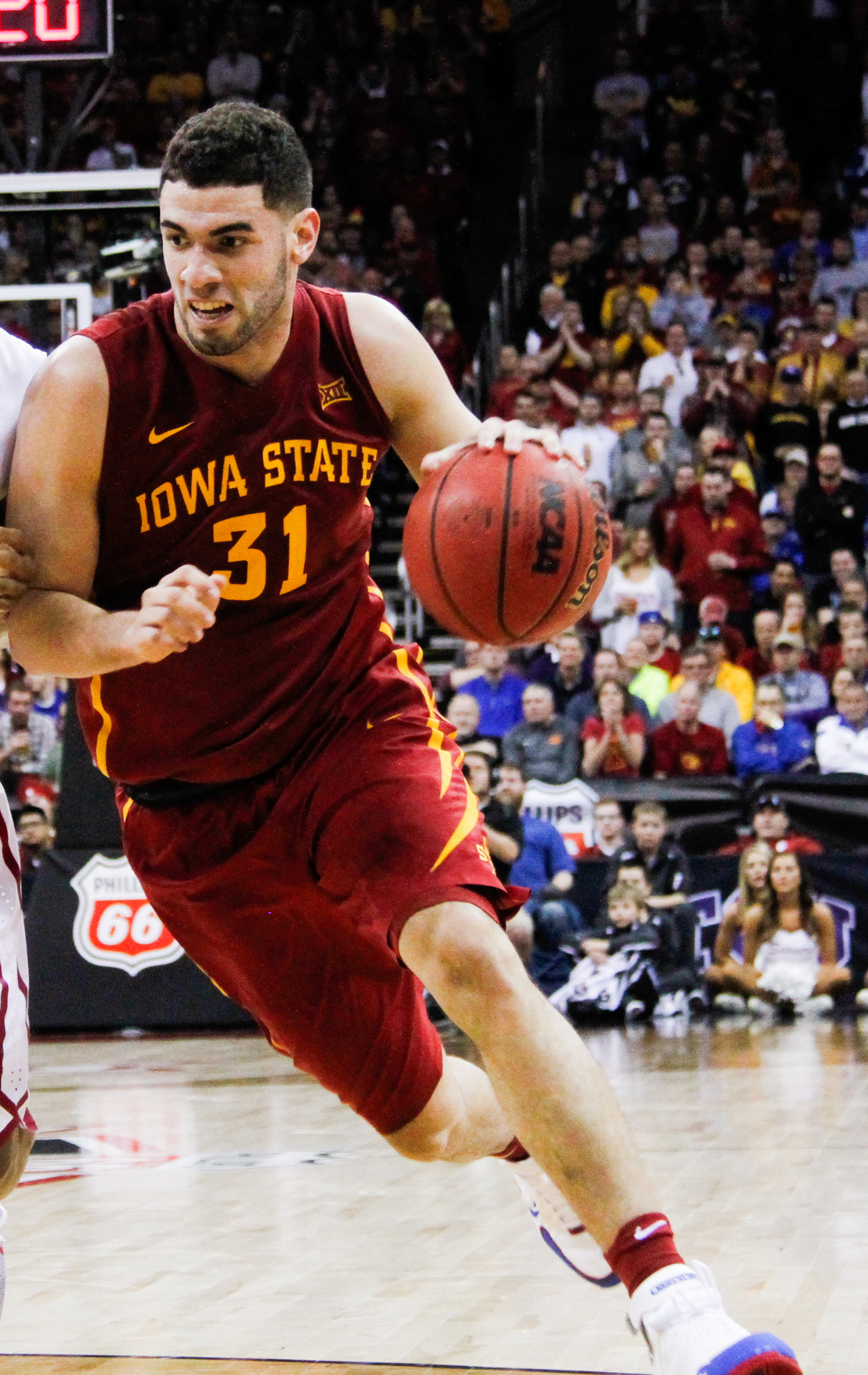
Niang playing for Iowa State

Niang was named to the Big 12 All-Rookie Team in his freshman year in 2013. In the second round of the 2014 NCAA tournament, Niang broke the fifth metatarsal in his right foot, forcing him to sit for the remainder of the event. As a sophomore, he averaged 16.7 points and 4.5 rebounds as the third-most-prominent offensive weapon for Iowa State behind Melvin Ejim and DeAndre Kane.

Niang cut back on his calorie consumption in the 2014 offseason and consequently slimmed down to 230 pounds (100 kg) from 260 pounds (120 kg). As a junior, Niang led the team in scoring with 15.3 points per game to go along with 5.4 rebounds and 3.4 assists per game. Seeded third in the 2015 NCAA tournament, the Cyclones were upset by 14th-seeded UAB in the round of 64 despite 11 points and seven rebounds from Niang. He considered entering the 2015 NBA draft, but instead decided to return for his senior season. "I was weighing it, but I want to be loyal to the program and didn't want to go out this way," Niang said. "I didn't want to leave my mark like that."

Niang surpassed the 2,000-point threshold as a senior, averaging 20.2 points and 6.2 rebounds per game. He was named to the 35-man midseason watchlist for the Naismith College Player of the Year on February 11.

During his college career, Niang achieved a number of program records, including the first player to reach four straight NCAA tournaments, the first two-time All-American, the career leader in games played (138) and most wins (98).

== Professional career ==
=== Indiana Pacers (2016–2017) ===
On June 23, 2016, Niang was selected by the Indiana Pacers with the 50th overall pick in the 2016 NBA draft. He joined the team for the 2016 NBA Summer League, where his early play drew praise from Larry Bird. On July 11, 2016, he signed with the Pacers. During his rookie season, he had multiple assignments with the Fort Wayne Mad Ants of the NBA Development League. On July 14, 2017, he was waived by the Pacers.

=== Santa Cruz Warriors (2017–2018) ===
On August 16, 2017, Niang signed an Exhibit 10 contract with the Golden State Warriors. He was waived by the Warriors on October 14, 2017. He subsequently joined the Santa Cruz Warriors as an affiliate player.

=== Utah Jazz (2018–2021) ===
On January 14, 2018, Niang signed a two-way contract with the Utah Jazz to take up a spot previously held by former college teammate Naz Mitrou-Long. Throughout the rest of the season, he split his playing time between the Jazz and their NBA G League affiliate, the Salt Lake City Stars.

On July 13, 2018, Niang signed a standard contract with the Jazz.

Niang scored a then-career-high 24 points against the Los Angeles Clippers on April 10, 2019. He also notched a 24-point game against the Houston Rockets on May 8, 2021.

=== Philadelphia 76ers (2021–2023) ===
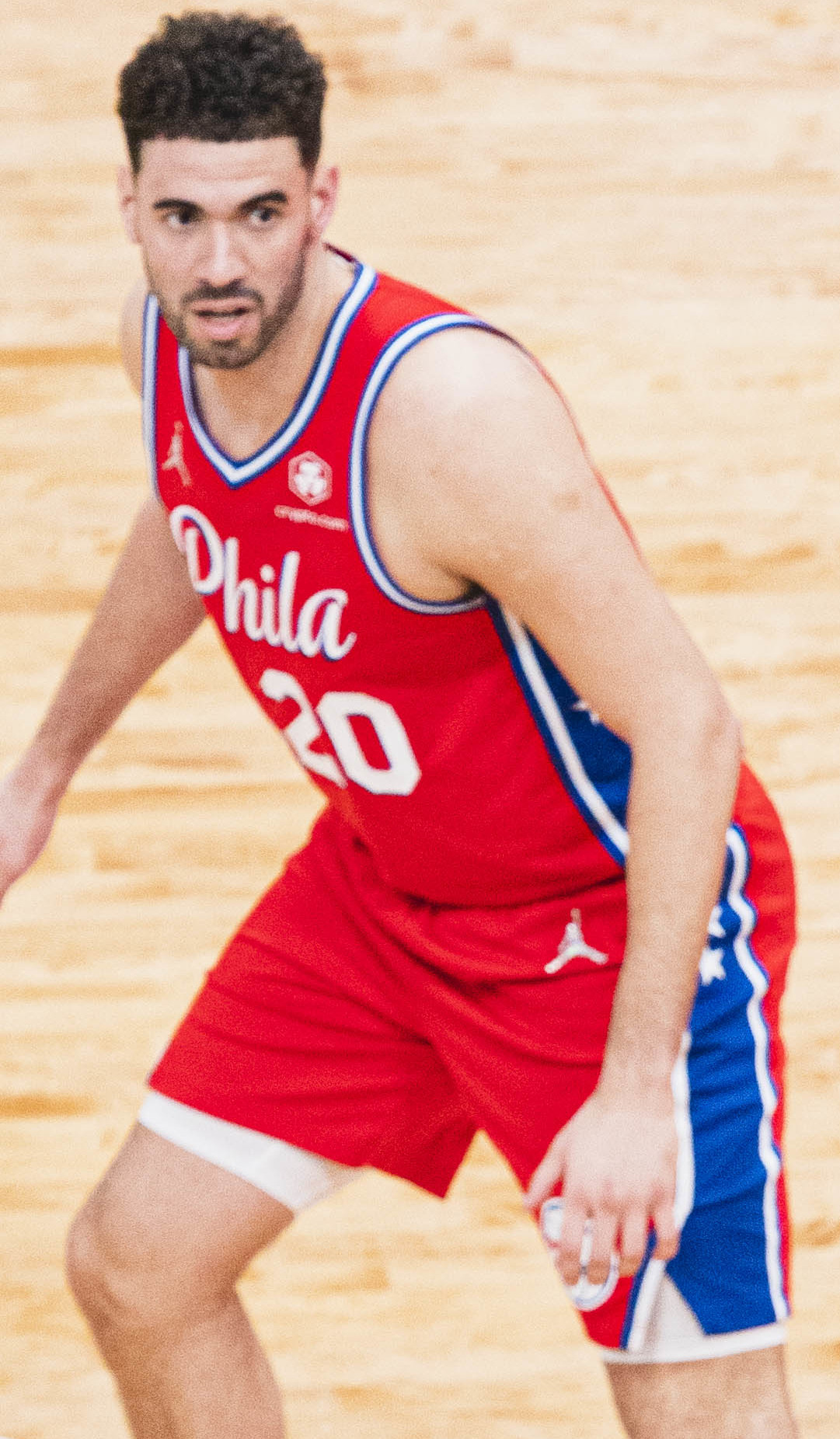
Niang with the Philadelphia 76ers in 2022

On August 9, 2021, Niang signed a two-year, $6.7 million contract with the Philadelphia 76ers. With the team, he carried over the "Minivan" nickname he maintained in Utah. His time with the 76ers accounted for his most sizable role - backing up forward Tobias Harris among others - and points per game to that point in his career. Niang had his highest scoring output as a Sixer on April 7, 2023, posting 24 points in a 136–131 overtime win over the Atlanta Hawks on 5-7 shooting from 3.

=== Cleveland Cavaliers (2023–2025) ===
On July 6, 2023, Niang signed with the Cleveland Cavaliers. On January 17, 2024, Niang scored a new career high of 33 points against the Milwaukee Bucks, making 13 of his 14 shots attempts. In the 2023-24 NBA season Niang played 82 games, averaging 9.4 points per game.

=== Atlanta Hawks (2025) ===
On February 6, 2025, Niang, along with Caris LeVert, three second-round picks, and two pick swaps were traded to the Atlanta Hawks in exchange for De'Andre Hunter.

=== Golden State Warriors (2026–present) ===
On July 7, 2025, Niang and a future second-round pick were traded to the Boston Celtics in a three-team trade that sent Kristaps Porziņģis and a second-round pick to the Hawks, and Terance Mann and the draft rights to Drake Powell (the 22nd pick in the 2025 NBA draft) to the Brooklyn Nets. On August 6, before ever appearing in a game for Boston, Niang was traded back to the Utah Jazz alongside two future second-round draft picks in exchange for RJ Luis Jr. and an $8 million trade exception. The Jazz considered Niang a great veteran presence and wanted him to be a positive impact on the younger players in the locker room, however, he didn't make an appearance for the Jazz because of a foot injury.

On February 3, 2026, Niang, Kyle Anderson, Walter Clayton Jr., Taylor Hendricks, and three first-round draft picks were traded to the Grizzlies in exchange for Jaren Jackson Jr., John Konchar, Jock Landale, and Vince Williams Jr. On February 5, Niang was waived by the Grizzlies.

On August 25, 2026, Niang signed with the Golden State Warriors. On October 21, he made his Warriors debut, recording seven points, two assists and two steals in a 127–105 loss to the Los Angeles Lakers.

== Career statistics ==
Legend
GP	Games played	GS	Games started	MPG	Minutes per game
FG%	Field goal percentage	3P%	3-point field goal percentage	FT%	Free throw percentage
RPG	Rebounds per game	APG	Assists per game	SPG	Steals per game
BPG	Blocks per game	PPG	Points per game	**Bold**	Career high
*	Led the league

=== NBA ===
==== Regular season ====
Year	Team	GP	GS	MPG	FG%	3P%	FT%	RPG	APG	SPG	BPG	PPG
2016–17	Indiana	23	0	4.0	.250	.083	**1.000**	0.7	0.2	0.1	0.0	0.9
2017–18	Utah	9	0	3.5	.364	.000	.500	1.0	.3	.2	.0	1.0
2018–19	Utah	59	0	8.8	.475	.410	.833	1.5	.6	.2	.1	4.0
2019–20	Utah	66	1	14.0	.438	.400	.833	1.9	.7	.3	.1	5.9
2020–21	Utah	72*	**10**	16.0	.437	**.425**	.957	2.4	.8	.3	.1	6.9
2021–22	Philadelphia	76	7	**22.8**	.437	.403	.881	2.7	**1.3**	**.4**	**.2**	9.2
2022–23	Philadelphia	78	1	19.4	.442	.401	.867	2.4	1.0	**.4**	**.2**	8.2
2023–24	Cleveland	**82**	**10**	22.3	.449	.376	.850	3.4	1.2	**.4**	.2	9.4
2024–25	Cleveland	51	1	20.7	**.477**	.400	.793	**3.7**	1.3	.3	.1	8.7
2024–25	Atlanta	28	2	23.0	.441	.413	.793	3.0	**1.6**	.4	**.3**	**12.1**
Career		544	32	17.5	.445	.399	.852	2.5	1.0	.3	.1	7.4

==== Playoffs ====
Year	Team	GP	GS	MPG	FG%	3P%	FT%	RPG	APG	SPG	BPG	PPG
2019	Utah	5	0	11.0	.409	.308	—	**2.8**	**1.0**	.2	**.2**	4.4
2020	Utah	7	0	16.3	**.500**	.414	**1.000**	2.1	.6	.0	.1	**8.3**
2021	Utah	11	0	11.7	.282	.300	**1.000**	1.7	.7	.0	.1	3.2
2022	Philadelphia	**12**	0	**16.5**	.417	.372	**1.000**	1.5	.9	.3	.0	4.8
2023	Philadelphia	11	0	14.3	**.500**	**.462**	—	.4	.2	.0	**.2**	4.4
2024	Cleveland	10	0	12.1	.220	.130	.875	1.2	.4	**.4**	**.2**	2.8
Career		56	0	13.8	.387	.341	.938	1.5	.6	.1	.1	4.4

=== College ===
Year	Team	GP	GS	MPG	FG%	3P%	FT%	RPG	APG	SPG	BPG	PPG
2012–13	Iowa State	**35**	23	25.1	.515	.392	.700	4.6	1.8	.7	.2	12.1
2013–14	Iowa State	34	**34**	30.1	.474	.327	.721	4.5	**3.6**	.6	.6	16.7
2014–15	Iowa State	34	**34**	30.7	.461	**.400**	.808	5.4	3.4	.5	.5	15.3
2015–16	Iowa State	34	**34**	**33.2**	**.546**	.390	**.813**	**6.2**	3.3	**.9**	**.6**	**20.2**
Career		121	109	29.2	.490	.375	.762	5.1	3.0	.6	.5	15.4
