= 2014–15 Iowa State Cyclones men's basketball team =

American college basketball season

2014–15 Iowa State Cyclones men's basketball

Big 12 Conference tournament champions

NCAA tournament, round of 64
- Conference: Big 12 Conference

Ranking
- Coaches: No. 19
- AP: No. 9
- Record: 25–9 (12–6 Big 12)
- Head coach: Fred Hoiberg (5th season)
- Assistant coaches: Matt Abdelmassih; Charlie Henry; Cornell Mann
- Home arena: Hilton Coliseum

2014–15 Big 12 men's basketball standings
	Conf.				Overall
Team	W		L	PCT	W		L	PCT
No. 10 Kansas	13	–	5	.722	27	–	9	.750
No. 9 Iowa State †	12	–	6	.667	25	–	9	.735
No. 13 Oklahoma	12	–	6	.667	24	–	11	.686
No. 16 Baylor	11	–	7	.611	24	–	10	.706
No. 20 West Virginia	11	–	7	.611	25	–	10	.714
Oklahoma State	8	–	10	.444	18	–	14	.563
Texas	8	–	10	.444	20	–	14	.588
Kansas State	8	–	10	.444	15	–	17	.469
TCU	4	–	14	.222	18	–	15	.545
Texas Tech	3	–	15	.167	13	–	19	.406
† 2015 Big 12 Tournament winner Rankings from AP poll

The 2014–15 Iowa State Cyclones men's basketball team represented Iowa State University during the 2014–15 NCAA Division I men's basketball season. The Cyclones were coached by Fred Hoiberg, who was in his fifth season. They played their home games at Hilton Coliseum in Ames, Iowa and competed in the Big 12 Conference.

They finished the season 25–9, 12–6 in Big 12 play to finish in second place. They defeated Texas, Oklahoma, and Kansas to become champions of the Big 12 Conference tournament to earn an automatic bid to the NCAA tournament. In the NCAA Tournament they were upset by UAB in the first round.

At the conclusion of the season, head coach Fred Hoiberg accepted the same position with the Chicago Bulls of the NBA.

== Previous season ==
The Cyclones finished 28–8, and 11–7 in Big 12 play to finish in a tie for 3rd place in the regular season conference standings. They defeated Kansas State, Kansas, and Baylor to become champions of the Big 12 Conference tournament to earn an automatic bid to the NCAA tournament. In the NCAA Tournament, they defeated North Carolina Central and North Carolina to advance to the Sweet Sixteen, where they lost to UConn.

=== Offseason departures ===
Offseason departures
Name	Position	Reason for departure
Melvin Ejim	Forward	Graduated
DeAndre Kane	Guard	Graduated
Tyler Ellerman	Forward	Graduated
Percy Gibson	Forward	Transferred to Oakland
K.J. Bluford	Guard	Transferred to Northern Arizona

== Recruiting ==
=== Prep recruits ===
College recruiting
Name	Hometown	School	Height	Weight	Commit date
Clayton Custer; PG	Overland Park, Kansas	Blue Valley Northwest	6 ft 1 in (1.85 m)	160 lb (73 kg)	Nov 19, 2012
Clayton Custer; PG	Recruit ratings: Scout: Rivals: 247Sports: ESPN: (75)				
Georgios Tsalmpouris; C	Katerini, GRE	3rd High School of Katerini	7 ft 1 in (2.16 m)	N/A	May 10, 2014
Georgios Tsalmpouris; C	Recruit ratings: Scout: Rivals: 247Sports: ESPN: (NR)				
Overall recruit ranking: 247Sports: 115
Note: In many cases, Scout, Rivals, 247Sports, On3, and ESPN may conflict in their listings of height and weight.; In these cases, the average was taken. ESPN grades are on a 100-point scale.; Sources: "Iowa State 2014 Basketball Commitments". Rivals.; "2014 Iowa State Basketball Commits". Scout.; "ESPN". ESPN.; "Scout.com Team Recruiting Rankings". Scout.; "2014 Team Ranking". Rivals.

=== Incoming transfers ===
Incoming transfers
Name	Position	Hometown	Previous school	Remaining eligibility	Notes
Bryce Dejean-Jones	Guard	Los Angeles	UNLV	1	Dejean-Jones was eligible to play immediately.
Hallice Cooke	Guard	Union City, New Jersey	Oregon State	2	Cooke sat out the 2014–15 season due to NCAA eligibility rules.
Deonte Burton	Forward	Milwaukee	Marquette	1.5	Burton transferred after the fall semester of the 2014–15 season. He was eligible to play the spring semester of the 2015–16 season.

== Roster ==
2014–15 Iowa State Cyclones men's basketball team
Players
Coaches

Pos.	#	Name	Height	Weight	Year	Previous school	Hometown
F	1	Jameel McKay	6 ft 9 in (2.06 m)	215 lb (98 kg)	RS Jr	Marquette	Milwaukee
F	2	Abdel Nader	6 ft 6 in (1.98 m)	230 lb (104 kg)	RS Jr	Northern Illinois	Skokie, Illinois
G	3	Hallice Cooke (redshirt)	6 ft 3 in (1.91 m)	190 lb (86 kg)	RS So	Oregon State	Union City, New Jersey
G	3	Clayton Custer	6 ft 0 in (1.83 m)	175 lb (79 kg)	Fr	Blue Valley Northwest	Overland Park, Kansas
G	4	Sherron Dorsey-Walker	6 ft 4 in (1.93 m)	200 lb (91 kg)	RS So	Pershing	Detroit
G	11	Monté Morris (C)	6 ft 2 in (1.88 m)	170 lb (77 kg)	So	Beecher	Flint, Michigan
G	12	Kourtlin Jackson	6 ft 4 in (1.93 m)	190 lb (86 kg)	Jr	John Wood CC	Des Moines, Iowa
G	13	Bryce Dejean-Jones	6 ft 6 in (1.98 m)	210 lb (95 kg)	RS Sr	UNLV	Los Angeles
G	15	Naz Long (C)	6 ft 4 in (1.93 m)	210 lb (95 kg)	Jr	Findlay Prep	Mississauga, Ontario
G	21	Matt Thomas	6 ft 4 in (1.93 m)	195 lb (88 kg)	So	Onalaska	Onalaska, Wisconsin
F	22	Dustin Hogue	6 ft 6 in (1.98 m)	220 lb (100 kg)	Sr	Indian Hills CC	Yonkers, New York
F	30	Deonte Burton (redshirt)	6 ft 4 in (1.93 m)	250 lb (113 kg)	RS So	Marquette	Milwaukee
F	31	Georges Niang (C)	6 ft 8 in (2.03 m)	230 lb (104 kg)	Jr	Tilton School	Methuen, Massachusetts
C	34	Georgios Tsalmpouris	7 ft 1 in (2.16 m)	227 lb (103 kg)	Fr	3rd High School of Katerini	Katerini, Greece
F	42	Daniel Edozie	6 ft 8 in (2.03 m)	235 lb (107 kg)	Sr	Tyler JC	Compton, California

Head coach

- Fred Hoiberg (Iowa State)

Assistant coach(es)

- Matt Abdelmassih (St. John's)
- Charlie Henry (Madonna)
- Cornell Mann (Akron)

Legend

- (C) Team captain
- (S) Suspended
- (I) Ineligible
- (W) Walk-on
- Injured
- Current redshirt

== Schedule and results ==
Date time, TV	Rank^{#}	Opponent^{#}	Result	Record	High points	High rebounds	High assists	Site (attendance) city, state
Exhibition
November 7, 2014; 7:00 pm, Cyclones.tv		Viterbo	W 115–48	–	– –	– –	– –	Hilton Coliseum (–); Ames, Iowa
Regular season
November 14, 2014*; 7:00 pm, Cyclones.tv	No. 14	Oakland; CBE Hall of Fame Classic	W 93–82	1–0	30 – Niang	11 – Dejean-Jones	5 – Niang	Hilton Coliseum (14,384); Ames, Iowa
November 17, 2014*; 8:00 pm, ESPNU	No. 14	Georgia State; CBE Hall of Fame Classic	W 81–58	2–0	19 – Morris	11 – Niang	9 – Morris	Hilton Coliseum (13,913); Ames, Iowa
November 24, 2014*; 8:30 pm, ESPN2	No. 13	vs. Alabama; CBE Hall of Fame Classic; Semifinals	W 84–74	3–0	28 – Niang	8 – Thomas	12 – Morris	Sprint Center (8,321); Kansas City, Missouri
November 25, 2014*; 8:30 pm, ESPNU	No. 13	vs. Maryland; CBE Hall of Fame Classic; Championship	L 63–72	3–1	17 – Dejean-Jones	7 – Dejean-Jones	4 – Niang	Sprint Center (9,034); Kansas City, Missouri
December 2, 2014*; 7:00 pm, Cyclones.tv	No. 20	Lamar	W 96–59	4–1	14 – Thomas	10 – Dejean-Jones	8 – Dejean-Jones	Hilton Coliseum (13,907); Ames, Iowa
December 4, 2014*; 8:00 pm, ESPN2	No. 20	No. 18 Arkansas; Big 12/SEC Challenge	W 95–77	5–1	27 – Dejean-Jones	6 – Dejean-Jones	8 – Niang	Hilton Coliseum (14,384); Ames, Iowa
December 9, 2014*; 6:00 pm, ESPNU	No. 14	UMKC	W 73–56	6–1	22 – Dejean-Jones	7 – Niang	7 – Niang	Hilton Coliseum (13,902); Ames, Iowa
December 12, 2014*; 7:00 pm, BTN	No. 14	at Iowa; Iowa Corn Cy-Hawk Series	W 90–75	7–1	21 – Long	13 – Hogue	7 – Niang	Carver–Hawkeye Arena (15,400); Iowa City, Iowa
December 14, 2014*; 5:00 pm, Cyclones.tv	No. 14	Southern	W 88–78	8–1	18 – Dejean-Jones	8 – Nader	5 – Morris	Hilton Coliseum (14,384); Ames, Iowa
December 20, 2014*; 4:00 pm, Mediacom	No. 13	vs. Drake; Big Four Classic	W 83–54	9–1	13 – Long	5 – Hogue	5 – Dejean-Jones	Wells Fargo Arena (15,124); Des Moines, Iowa
December 31, 2014*; 6:00 pm, Cyclones.tv	No. 9	Mississippi Valley State	W 83–33	10–1	24 – Long	9 – Edozie	6 – Dejean-Jones	Hilton Coliseum (14,384); Ames, Iowa
January 3, 2015*; 5:00 pm, CBSSN	No. 9	vs. South Carolina; Brooklyn Hoops Showcase	L 60–64	10–2	15 – McKay	8 – Niang	3 – Niang	Barclays Center (3,546); Brooklyn, New York
January 6, 2015; 8:00 pm, ESPN2	No. 17	Oklahoma State	W 63–61	11–2 (1–0)	17 – Hogue	9 – Dejean-Jones	6 – Morris	Hilton Coliseum (14,384); Ames, Iowa
January 10, 2015; 7:00 pm, ESPN2	No. 17	at No. 14 West Virginia	W 74–72	12–2 (2–0)	19 – Nader	7 – Nader	6 – Morris	WVU Coliseum (12,076); Morgantown, West Virginia
January 14, 2015; 8:00 pm, ESPNU	No. 11	at No. 22 Baylor	L 73–74	12–3 (2–1)	19 – Long	7 – Morris	9 – Morris	Ferrell Center (6,576); Waco, Texas
January 17, 2015; 8:00 pm, ESPN	No. 11	No. 9 Kansas; ESPN College GameDay	W 86–81	13–3 (3–1)	20 – Long	7 – Dejean-Jones	10 – Morris	Hilton Coliseum (14,384); Ames, Iowa
January 20, 2015; 6:00 pm, ESPN2	No. 9	Kansas State	W 77–71	14–3 (4–1)	15 – McKay	7 – McKay	4 – Niang	Hilton Coliseum (14,384); Ames, Iowa
January 24, 2015; 3:00 pm, ESPNU	No. 9	at Texas Tech	L 73–78	14–4 (4–2)	20 – Morris	10 – McKay	3 – Morris	United Spirit Arena (9,310); Lubbock, Texas
January 26, 2015; 8:00 pm, ESPN	No. 15	No. 19 Texas	W 89–86	15–4 (5–2)	19 – Niang	7 – Long	6 – Morris	Hilton Coliseum (14,384); Ames, Iowa
January 31, 2015; 1:00 pm, ESPNU	No. 15	TCU	W 83–66	16–4 (6–2)	23 – Niang	8 – Niang	6 – Morris	Hilton Coliseum (14,384); Ames, Iowa
February 2, 2015; 8:00 pm, ESPN	No. 11	at No. 8 Kansas	L 76–89	16–5 (6–3)	24 – Niang	9 – Dejean-Jones	5 – Niang	Allen Fieldhouse (16,300); Lawrence, Kansas
February 7, 2015; 1:00 pm, ESPNU	No. 11	Texas Tech	W 75–38	17–5 (7–3)	17 – McKay	8 – McKay	6 – Morris	Hilton Coliseum (14,384); Ames, Iowa
February 9, 2015; 8:00 pm, ESPN	No. 14	at No. 17 Oklahoma	L 83–94	17–6 (7–4)	19 – Hogue	9 – McKay	4 – Niang	Lloyd Noble Center (11,099); Norman, Oklahoma
February 14, 2015; 3:00 pm, ESPN2	No. 14	No. 21 West Virginia	W 79–59	18–6 (8–4)	19 – Morris	8 – McKay	5 – Morris	Hilton Coliseum (14,384); Ames, Iowa
February 18, 2015; 8:00 pm, ESPNU	No. 14	at No. 22 Oklahoma State	W 70–65	19–6 (9–4)	17 – McKay	14 – McKay	5 – Morris	Gallagher-Iba Arena (7,612); Stillwater, Oklahoma
February 21, 2015; 1:00 pm, ESPN2	No. 14	at Texas	W 85–77	20–6 (10–4)	17 – Niang	9 – McKay	5 – Morris	Frank Erwin Center (13,161); Austin, Texas
February 25, 2015; 8:00 pm, ESPNU	No. 12	No. 19 Baylor	L 70–79	20–7 (10–5)	21 – McKay	8 – McKay	6 – Morris	Hilton Coliseum (14,384); Ames, Iowa
February 28, 2015; 4:00 pm, ESPN2	No. 12	at Kansas State	L 69–70	20–8 (10–6)	21 – Niang	10 – McKay	5 – Long	Bramlage Coliseum (12,528); Manhattan, Kansas
March 2, 2015; 8:00 pm, ESPN	No. 17	No. 15 Oklahoma	W 77–70	21–8 (11–6)	23 – Niang	12 – McKay	5 – Morris	Hilton Coliseum (14,384); Ames, Iowa
March 7, 2015; 7:30 pm, ESPNews	No. 17	at TCU	W 89–76	22–8 (12–6)	19 – Niang	10 – McKay	6 – Niang	Wilkerson-Greines Center (5,076); Fort Worth, Texas
Big 12 Tournament
March 12, 2015; 6:00 pm, ESPNU	(2) No. 13	vs. (7) Texas; Quarterfinals	W 69–67	23–8	24 – Morris	9 – McKay	6 – Niang	Sprint Center (18,972); Kansas City, Missouri
March 13, 2015; 8:00 pm, ESPN2	(2) No. 13	vs. (3) No. 15 Oklahoma; Semifinals	W 67–65	24–8	13 – Niang	9 – McKay	4 – Niang	Sprint Center (18,972); Kansas City, Missouri
March 14, 2015; 5:00 pm, ESPN	(2) No. 13	vs. (1) No. 9 Kansas; Championship	W 70–66	25–8	19 – Niang	8 – McKay	6 – Morris	Sprint Center (18,972); Kansas City, Missouri
NCAA Tournament
March 19, 2015; 11:40, truTV	(3 S) No. 9	vs. (14 S) UAB; Second round	L 59–60	25–9	15 – Morris	12 – McKay	4 – Morris	KFC Yum! Center; Louisville, Kentucky
*Non-conference game. ^{#}Rankings from AP poll. (#) Tournament seedings in parentheses. All times are in Central Time.

== Rankings ==
Ranking movements Legend: ██ Increase in ranking ██ Decrease in ranking
	Week																				
Poll	Pre	1	2	3	4	5	6	7	8	9	10	11	12	13	14	15	16	17	18	19	Final
AP poll	14	14	14	13	20	14	13	12	9	17	11	9	15	11	14	14	12	17	13	9	
Coaches Poll	14	14	14	13	19	13	13	12	9	16	13	12	16	14	14	14	13	17	15	10	19

== Awards and honors ==
- All-Americans

Georges Niang (3rd Team)

- Big 12 Defensive Player of the Year

Jameel McKay

- All-Conference Selections

Georges Niang (1st Team)
Monté Morris (2nd Team)
Jameel McKay (3rd Team)
Dustin Hogue (Honorable Mention)

- Big 12 All-Tournament Team

Georges Niang (MVP)
Monté Morris

- Big 12 All-Defensive Team

Jameel McKay

- Big 12 All-Newcomer Team

Jameel McKay

- Academic All-Big 12 First Team

Matt Thomas (basketball)
