= Abdel Nader =

American-Egyptian former basketball player (born 1993)

Abdel Nader عبد الرحمن نادر
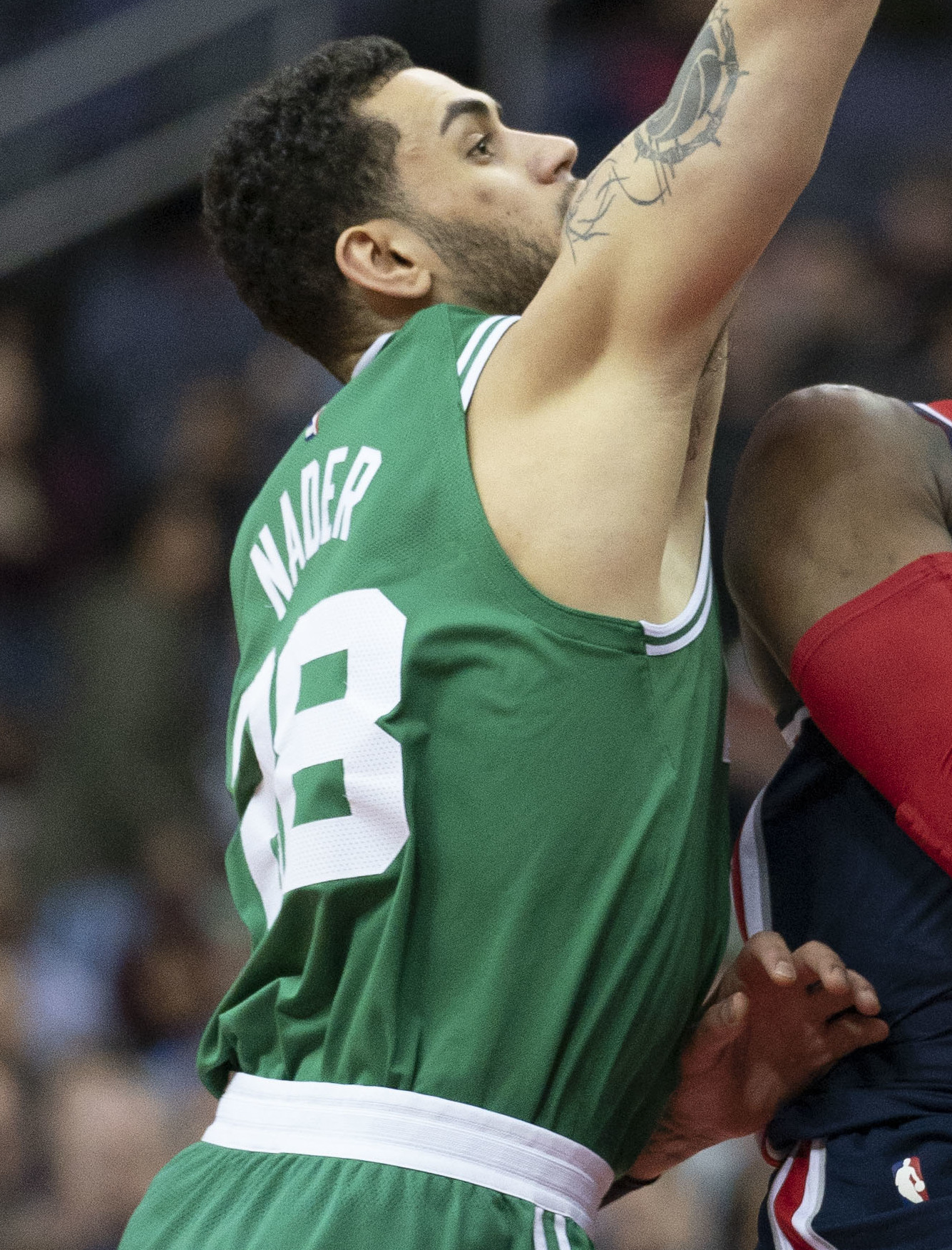
- Nader with the Boston Celtics in 2018

Personal information
- Born: September 25, 1993 (age 33) Alexandria, Egypt
- Listed height: 6 ft 5 in (1.96 m)
- Listed weight: 225 lb (102 kg)

Career information
- High school: Maine East (Park Ridge, Illinois); Niles North (Skokie, Illinois)
- College: Northern Illinois (2011–2013); Iowa State (2014–2016)
- NBA draft: 2016: 2nd round, 58th overall pick
- Drafted by: Boston Celtics
- Playing career: 2016–2024
- Position: Small forward

Career history
- 2016–2017: Maine Red Claws
- 2017–2018: Boston Celtics
- 2017–2018: →Maine Red Claws
- 2018–2020: Oklahoma City Thunder
- 2020–2022: Phoenix Suns
- 2023–2024: South East Melbourne Phoenix

Career highlights
- NBA D-League Rookie of the Year (2017); All-NBA D-League Second Team (2017); NBA D-League All-Rookie Team (2017); NBA D-League All-Star (2017); MAC All-Freshman Team (2012)
- Stats at NBA.com
- Stats at Basketball Reference

Abdel Rahman Nader (Arabic: عبد الرحمن نادر; born September 25, 1993) is an Egyptian-American former professional basketball player. He played college basketball for the Northern Illinois Huskies and the Iowa State Cyclones before being drafted by the Boston Celtics with the 58th overall pick in the 2016 NBA draft. Nader has also played for the Oklahoma City Thunder. He is one of two Egyptian-born players to play in the National Basketball Association (NBA), the other being Alaa Abdelnaby.

== Early life ==
Born in Alexandria, Egypt, Nader started his career at Maine East High School, before transferring to Niles North. He averaged 23.8 points, 8.6 rebounds and 2.8 assists per game as a senior at Niles North and led the Vikings to a 24–6 record and their first sectional championship and Central Suburban League titles in the school's 47-year history. He garnered First Team All-State honors from the Chicago Tribune, earned Chicago Sun-Times Class 4A Second Team All-State recognition, and named to the ESPN Chicago All-Area team.

== College career ==
=== Freshman season ===
Nader enrolled at Northern Illinois University and appeared in all 31 games starting in 29 of them. He averaged a team-best 10.4 points, third among MAC freshmen; and 4.2 rebounds, second-best among MAC freshmen. Nader recorded 21 steals and a team-high 22 blocked shots, the best among conference freshmen. He made his first collegiate start in the season opener at Purdue, scoring nine points and grabbing four rebounds. He scored in double figures in 17 games, including three games of 20-plus points as well as having a season-best 26 points against Ball State. Nader's freshman season earned him MAC All-Freshman Team honors.

=== Sophomore season ===
Nader began the season as a preseason All-MAC West selection. He started 18 of the 19 games he played in, leading the team in scoring at 13.1 points while averaging 5.6 rebounds, 1.3 assists and shooting 77.2 percent from the free-throw line (44-57 FT). He scored in double figures 13 times, including three games with 20-plus points. Abdel posted 23 points on 4-of-5 shooting from 3-point range against Central Michigan (8-12 FG). He was named MAC West Player of the Week on Feb 4 after averaging 22.5 points and 11.0 rebounds during the week. In spite of Nader's contributions, the Huskies finished last in the MAC West division and had a 5–15 team record overall, and it was reported that he would be transferring to another school.

=== Junior season ===
Nader eventually transferred to Iowa State. He had to sit out the 2013–2014 season, becoming eligible again for the 2014–15 season. Nader saw action in 32 games, averaging 5.8 points and 2.9 rebounds in 16.4 minutes per game. He was tied for second on the team with 16 blocked shots. He grabbed six boards, two blocks, two steals, and hit 6-of-10 field goals, including 4-of-6 behind the arc to score 19 points in Iowa State's victory at Iowa. He matched his season-high with 19 points at West Virginia. Nader scored 11 points and had six rebounds at home against Kansas State. He scored seven consecutive points in a key second-half run against the Wildcats and blocked a fastbreak layup with 2:48 left that would have given the Wildcats the lead. Nader averaged 11.2 points and 5.3 rebounds when playing at least 20 minutes, ISU was 8–1 in those games.

== Professional career ==
=== Maine Red Claws (2016–2017) ===
On June 24, 2016, Nader was drafted by the Boston Celtics with the 58th overall pick in the 2016 NBA draft. He then joined the Celtics for the 2016 NBA Summer League. On October 31, 2016, he was acquired by the Maine Red Claws of the NBA Development League. On April 14, 2017, he was named the 2016–17 NBA Development League Rookie of the Year, becoming the first internationally born player to be named NBA D-League Rookie of the Year and the third Red Claws player to earn the honor. Nader averaged 21.3 points, 6.2 rebounds and 3.9 assists in 40 games, propelling the Red Claws to a 29–21 record and the Eastern Conference's second seed in the 2017 NBA D-League Playoffs. In addition to shooting 44.6 percent from the floor, Nader recorded a team-high 99 three-pointers. He also tallied 16 points, four rebounds and four assists during the 2017 D-League All-Star Game in New Orleans.

=== Boston Celtics (2017–2018) ===
On July 14, 2017, Nader agreed to a 4-year, $6M deal with the Celtics. He made his NBA debut on October 18 against the Milwaukee Bucks. During his rookie season, he received multiple assignments to the Maine Red Claws. In four games with the Red Claws, he averaged 21.3 points, 5.8 rebounds, and 1.5 assists per game. Nader posted 3.1 points and 1.4 rebounds per game with the Celtics, and appeared in 11 playoff games during Celtics Eastern Conference Finals run.

=== Oklahoma City Thunder (2018–2020) ===
On July 23, 2018, Nader was traded to the Oklahoma City Thunder in exchange for Rodney Purvis. Oklahoma City also received cash considerations in the deal. On November 28, 2019, Nader scored his career-high 23 points with two rebounds in a 136–119 loss against the Portland Trail Blazers.

=== Phoenix Suns (2020–2022) ===
On November 16, 2020, the Thunder traded Nader and Chris Paul to the Phoenix Suns for Kelly Oubre Jr., Ricky Rubio, Ty Jerome, Jalen Lecque, and a protected 2022 first-round pick. After getting a concussion in a December 2020 preseason against the Utah Jazz, he made his season debut on January 11, 2021, against the Washington Wizards. On January 28, Nader scored a season-high 16 points in a blowout 114–93 win over the Golden State Warriors. On March 4, he had a near-double-double performance with 14 points and a career-high 9 rebounds off the bench in another blowout victory over Golden State, this time ending with a 120–98 win. Nader made the NBA Finals, but the Suns lost in 6 games to the Milwaukee Bucks. On August 6, 2021, Nader re-signed with the Suns. Nader was then later waived on February 10, 2022.

=== S.E. Melbourne Phoenix (2023–2024) ===
On December 12, 2023, Nader signed with the South East Melbourne Phoenix of the Australian National Basketball League (NBL) for the rest of the 2023–24 season.

== International career ==
Nader is eligible for the Egypt national team and has confirmed that he would be making his debut at the 2023 FIBA Basketball World Cup. However, he managed to complete the procedures to represent Egypt in March 2024.

== Career statistics ==
Legend
GP	Games played	GS	Games started	MPG	Minutes per game
FG%	Field goal percentage	3P%	3-point field goal percentage	FT%	Free throw percentage
RPG	Rebounds per game	APG	Assists per game	SPG	Steals per game
BPG	Blocks per game	PPG	Points per game	**Bold**	Career high

=== NBA ===
==== Regular season ====
Year	Team	GP	GS	MPG	FG%	3P%	FT%	RPG	APG	SPG	BPG	PPG
2017–18	Boston	48	1	10.9	.336	.354	.590	1.5	.5	.3	.2	3.0
2018–19	Oklahoma City	**61**	1	11.4	.423	.320	.750	1.9	.3	.3	.2	4.0
2019–20	Oklahoma City	55	**6**	**15.8**	.468	.375	**.773**	1.8	.7	.4	**.4**	6.3
2020–21	Phoenix	24	0	14.8	**.491**	**.419**	.757	**2.6**	**.8**	.4	**.4**	**6.7**
2021–22	Phoenix	14	0	10.4	.343	.286	.600	1.9	.5	**.6**	.3	2.4
Career		202	8	12.8	.428	.357	.718	1.9	.5	.4	.3	4.6

==== Playoffs ====
Year	Team	GP	GS	MPG	FG%	3P%	FT%	RPG	APG	SPG	BPG	PPG
2018	Boston	**11**	0	3.0	.333	.000	**.500**	.3	**.3**	.1	.1	1.1
2019	Oklahoma City	3	0	1.7	**.500**	—	—	.0	.0	.0	.3	.7
2020	Oklahoma City	3	0	**8.3**	.143	**.200**	**.500**	**1.0**	.0	**.3**	**.7**	**1.3**
2021	Phoenix	5	0	5.8	.333	.000	—	**1.0**	.0	.0	.0	.8
Career		22	0	4.2	.300	.091	.500	.5	.1	.1	.2	1.0

=== College ===
Year	Team	GP	GS	MPG	FG%	3P%	FT%	RPG	APG	SPG	BPG	PPG
2011–12	Northern Illinois	31	29	24.2	.337	.299	.682	4.2	1.1	.7	**.7**	10.4
2012–13	Northern Illinois	19	18	25.4	.337	.277	**.772**	**5.6**	.9	**1.3**	.5	**13.1**
2014–15	Iowa State	32	0	16.4	.406	.217	.767	2.9	.7	.4	.5	5.8
2015–16	Iowa State	**35**	**35**	**31.1**	**.478**	**.371**	.736	5.0	**1.5**	1.1	**.7**	12.9
Career		136	56	20.6	.469	.382	.789	2.7	1.3	.7	.2	8.8

== Personal life ==
Nader moved with his family to the United States at the age of 3 and considers Skokie, Illinois his hometown. He majored in liberal studies at Iowa State University. He is a native Arabic speaker, only becoming fluent in English at the age of eight or nine.
