= Hallice Cooke =

American basketball player

Personal information
- Born: January 5, 1995 (age 31) Harlem, New York, U.S.
- Listed height: 6 ft 3 in (1.91 m)
- Listed weight: 190 lb (86 kg)

Career information
- High school: St. Anthony (Jersey City, New Jersey)
- College: Oregon State (2013–2014); Iowa State (2015–2016); Nevada (2017–2018)
- Position: Guard

Career highlights
- Pac-12 All-Freshman Honorable Mention (2014)

Hallice Cooke (/ˈhælɪs/ HAL-iss; born January 5, 1995) is an American basketball player who last played college basketball for the Nevada Wolf Pack.

== Early life ==
Cooke grew up in Union City, New Jersey and played at St. Anthony High School for legendary coach Bob Hurley. His team went 28–2 as a senior and was ranked the 45th best guard in the nation by Rivals.com. He earned MVP honors at the 2013 SNY Invitational after scoring game-high 22 points as St. Anthony won its 81st consecutive game. Cooke played in West Coast All-Star Classic, Mary Kline Classic and Schoolboy Classic in 2013 and played in Sports U AAU program, which is same program as future Cyclone teammate Dustin Hogue.

== College career ==
=== Freshman season ===
Cooke played in all 32 games making 18 starts for the Beavers, he averaged 8.2 points, 2.6 rebounds, and 2.5 assists. He earned Pac-12 All-Freshman Honorable Mention honors and finished second in the conference in three-point field goal percentage (.456). He hit 41 three-pointers, the fourth most by a freshman in Oregon State history. Cooke scored in double figures 10 times, including 20 or more points twice and made a three-pointer in 13 consecutive games. Cooke scored 16 points in first career start against Stanford, tallied 20 points against UCLA, and scored career-high 23 points in final game of the season against Radford.

=== Redshirt season ===
At the end of the season, Cooke transferred to Iowa State. Cooke sat out the 2014–15 season due to NCAA eligibility rules. Cooke took advantage of his redshirt season by having cartilage tears in both hips surgically repaired. He recuperated for five months in his home town of Union City, New Jersey.

=== Nevada ===
After transferring from Iowa State to Nevada, Cooke had to sit out a season due to transfer rules and did not play in the 2016–2017 season. Cooke is listed on the Nevada Basketball roster as a 6'-3 190 guard for the 2017–2018 season. Nevada made it to the Sweet 16 before losing to Loyola-Chicago in the 2018 NCAA tournament.

=== College statistics ===
Year	Team	GP	GS	MPG	FG%	3P%	FT%	RPG	APG	SPG	BPG	PPG
2013–14	Oregon State	32	18	26.3	.459	.456	.737	2.6	2.5	.8	.1	8.2
2015–16	Iowa State	32	–	10.9	.403	.365	.636	1.0	.9	.3	.1	2.6
2017–18	Nevada	37	12	20.1	.434	.478	.818	2.1	1.5	.6	.1	4.7
Career		101	30	19.2	.441	.444	.744	1.9	1.6	.6	.1	5.1
