= Georgios Tsalmpouris =

Greek basketball player (born 1996)

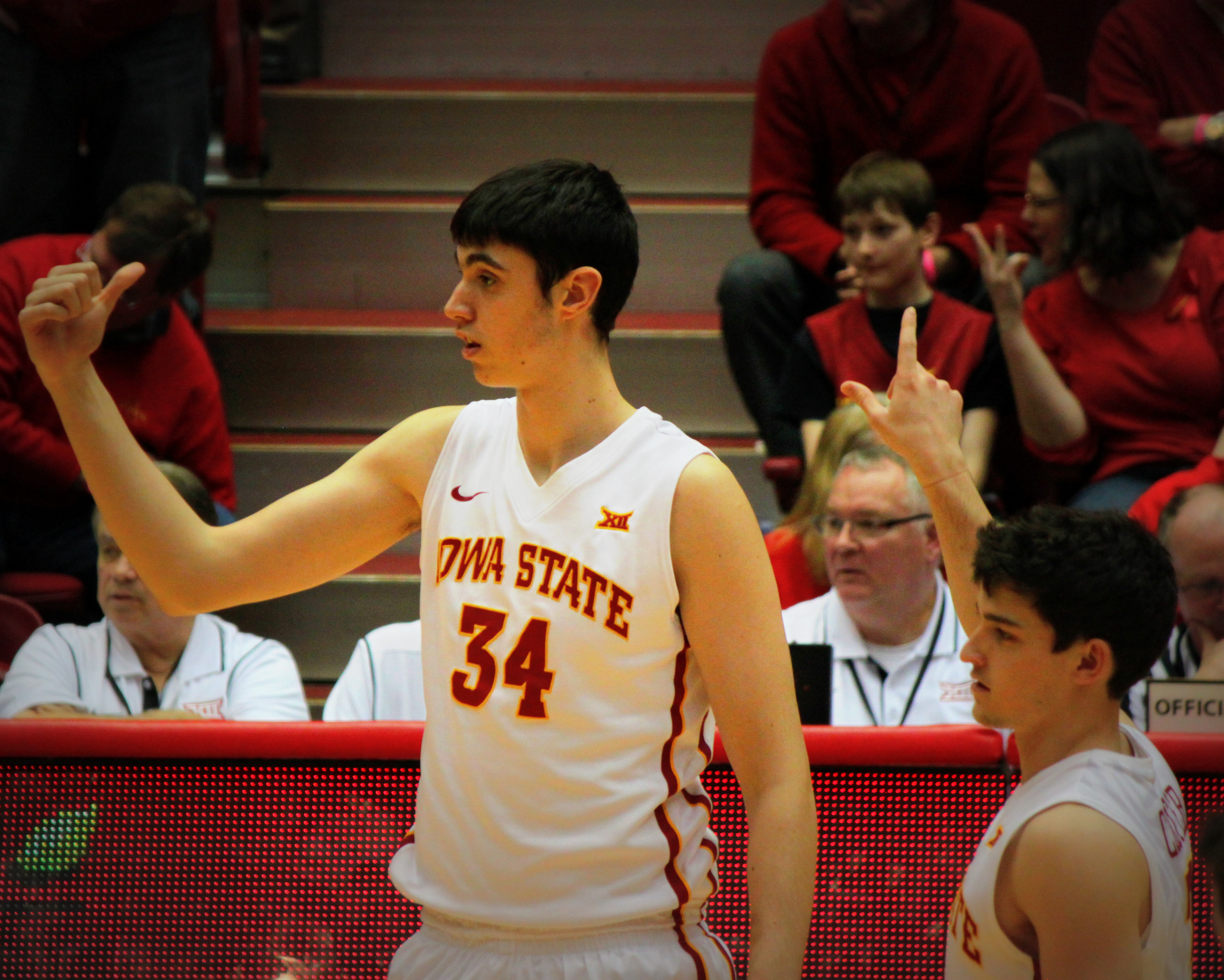
- Tsalmpouris in action with Iowa State

No. 35 – AEK Athens
- Position: Power forward / center
- League: Greek Basketball League

Personal information
- Born: 22 June 1996 (age 30) Veria, Greece
- Listed height: 7 ft 2 in (2.18 m)
- Listed weight: 240 lb (109 kg)

Career information
- College: Iowa State (2014–2015)
- NBA draft: 2016: undrafted
- Playing career: 2015–present

Career history
- 2015–2019: AEK Athens
- 2017–2018: →Kolossos Rodou
- 2019–2020: Kolossos Rodou
- 2020–2021: PAOK
- 2021–2022: Apollon Patras
- 2022–2023: Real Betis
- 2023–2024: Bilbao
- 2024–2025: Panionios
- 2025: Al-Rayyan
- 2025–2026: Panionios
- 2026–present: AEK Athens

Career highlights
- FIBA Intercontinental Cup champion (2019); Emir of Qatar Cup winner (2025); Greek Youth All Star Game Slam Dunk Champion (2018)
Medals
Men's basketball
Representing Greece
FIBA Europe Under-20 Championship B
Bronze medal – third place	2016 Greece	Under-20

Georgios Tsalmpouris (alternate spelling: Giorgos Tsalbouris) (Greek: Γιώργος Τσαλμπούρης; born 22 June 1996) is a Greek professional basketball player for AEK Athens of the Greek Basketball League. Tsalmpouris is 7 ft 2 in (2.18 m) tall, weighs 240 pounds (110 kg), and plays at the power forward and center positions.

== Early career ==
Tsalmpouris played club basketball with Archelaos Pierikos in the Greek B Basket League, the third level of the Greek basketball league system, at the semi-professional level, in the 2013–14 season.

== College career ==
In the 2014–15 season, Tsalmpouris played college basketball for the Iowa State Cyclones team. He was the seventh 7-footer in the school's history. He played in 8 games, and averaged 1.4 points, 0.8 rebounds, 0.3 assists, and 0.1 steals per game, in 4.4 minutes per game. In August 2015, after playing one season with Iowa State, Tsalmpouris left the school, and returned to Greece to play professionally.

== Professional career ==
In August 2015, Tsalmpouris signed a five-year contract with the Greek Basket League club AEK Athens. Tsalmpouris then became automatically draft eligible 2 years early, due to having played a year of professional basketball, right after a year of college basketball in the NCAA Division I, as well as previously playing under a start-up national basketball league, before participating in college basketball. So he was thus automatically entered into the 2016 NBA draft, but was not drafted after two rounds.

In 2017, he was loaned by AEK to the Greek club Kolossos Rodou. He returned to AEK for the 2018–19 season, and with them he won the 2019 FIBA Intercontinental Cup, before going back to Kolossos, on a free transfer in the summer of 2019. On September 12, 2020, Tsalmpouris signed with the Greek club PAOK Thessaloniki. On December 3, 2020, he recorded a then career high of 22 points against Aris Thessaloniki.

On August 22, 2021, Tsalmpouris moved to the Greek club Apollon Patras, where he enjoyed a very successful 2021–22 season campaign. In a total of 24 Greek Basaket League games played, he averaged 14.9 points, and 5.6 rebounds per game, while playing an average of around 32 minutes per contest.

On September 23, 2022, he signed with Real Betis of the Spanish Liga ACB. On February 17, 2023, he parted ways with the club. In 16 games played with Real Betis, he averaged 8.8 points and 2.9 rebounds per contest.

On February 26, 2023, he signed with Bilbao of the Spanish Liga ACB.

On July 25, 2024, Tsalmpouris returned to Greece for Panionios. He renewed his contract for one more year on June 14, 2025, after a short stint with Al-Rayyan.

On August 25, 2026, he returnes to AEK Athens after 7 years.

== National team career ==
=== Greek junior national team ===
Tsalmpouris was a member of the junior national teams of Greece. With Greece's junior national teams, he played at the following tournaments: the 2012 FIBA Europe Under-16 Championship, the 2014 FIBA Europe Under-18 Championship, the 2015 FIBA under-19 World Cup, the 2015 FIBA Europe Under-20 Championship, and the 2016 FIBA Europe Under-20 Championship Division B, where he won a bronze medal.

=== Greek senior national team ===
Tsalmpouris became a member of the senior men's Greek national basketball team in 2017.

== Career statistics ==
=== Domestic Leagues ===
==== Regular season ====
Legend
GP	Games played	MPG	Minutes per game	FG%	Field goal percentage
3P%	3-point field goal percentage	FT%	Free throw percentage	RPG	Rebounds per game
APG	Assists per game	SPG	Steals per game	BPG	Blocks per game
PPG	Points per game	**Bold**	Career high		Led the league

Note: Only games in the primary domestic competitions are included. Therefore, games in cup or European competitions are left out.

Year	Team	League	GP	MPG	FG%	3P%	FT%	RPG	APG	SPG	BPG	PPG
2015–16	A.E.K.	GBL	0	-	-	-	-	-	-	-	-	-
2016–17	A.E.K.	GBL	14	7.0	.487	.364	.750	1.1	.2	.1	.3	3.2
2017–18	A.E.K.	GBL	3	6.2	.300	.000	.500	1.0	0	.5	0	2.3
2017–18	Kolossos	GBL	16	10.5	.386	.313	.375	1.9	.4	.1	.3	3.6
2018–19	A.E.K.	GBL	21	10.0	.571	.350	.723	1.8	.2	.3	.2	3.7

==== Playoffs ====
Year	Team	League	GP	MPG	FG%	3P%	FT%	RPG	APG	SPG	BPG	PPG
2015–16	A.E.K.	GBL	1	2.4	.000	.000	-	1.0	0	0	1.0	0
2016–17	A.E.K.	GBL	0	-	-	-	-	-	-	-	-	-
2017–18	Kolossos	GBL	2	15.4	.462	.333	.667	1.5	0.0	0.5	0.5	8.0

=== FIBA Champions League ===
Year	Team	GP	MPG	FG%	3P%	FT%	RPG	APG	SPG	BPG	PPG
2016–17	A.E.K.	7	9.4	.391	.111	.857	1.1	.6	.3	.3	3.6
2018–19	A.E.K.	12	7.5	.400	.273	.714	.7	.4	.2	.5	2.0
