= Bryce Dejean-Jones =

American basketball player (1992–2016)

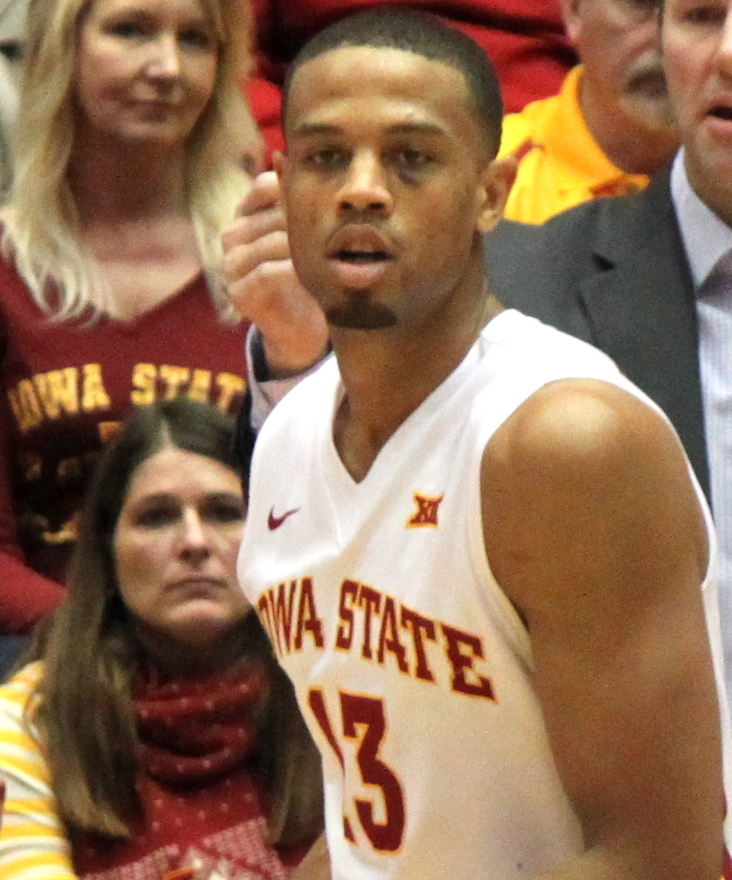
- Dejean-Jones in 2015

Personal information
- Born: August 21, 1992 Los Angeles, California, U.S.
- Died: May 28, 2016 (aged 23) Dallas, Texas, U.S.
- Listed height: 6 ft 6 in (1.98 m)
- Listed weight: 203 lb (92 kg)

Career information
- High school: View Park (Los Angeles, California); William Howard Taft (Woodland Hills, California)
- College: USC (2010–2011); UNLV (2012–2014); Iowa State (2014–2015)
- NBA draft: 2015: undrafted
- Playing career: 2015–2016
- Position: Shooting guard
- Number: 31

Career history
- 2015–2016: Idaho Stampede
- 2016: New Orleans Pelicans

Career highlights
- Third-team All-Mountain West (2014)
- Stats at NBA.com
- Stats at Basketball Reference

Bryce Alexander Dejean-Jones (August 21, 1992 – May 28, 2016) was an American professional basketball player. He played college basketball for Iowa State University after stints with USC and UNLV, and played professionally for the New Orleans Pelicans of the National Basketball Association (NBA). He was fatally shot on May 28, 2016, making him the first active NBA player to die since 2007.

== High school career ==
Dejean-Jones attended View Park Preparatory High School for two years, then transferred to and graduated from William Howard Taft Charter High School in the Woodland Hills section of Los Angeles. As a senior in 2009–10, he averaged 16.9 points, 7.5 rebounds, 1.9 assists, 1.6 steals and made 56.8 percent of his shots, including 49.3 percent from beyond the arc in leading the Toreadors to the L.A. City Section final and third round of the Division I state playoffs.

== College career ==
Dejean-Jones began his college career with USC, appearing in 18 of 34 games as a freshman and starting in each of the Trojans' first 10 games. In 20.6 minutes per game, he averaged 7.6 points, 2.6 rebounds, 1.6 assists and 1.1 steals per game while shooting 37.9 percent from the field and 34.5 percent from three-point range, scoring in double figures seven times, including a career-high 21 points against New Mexico State.

After his freshman season, Dejean-Jones transferred to UNLV, redshirting as a sophomore. As a redshirted sophomore in 2012–13, he was named the Mountain West Preseason Co-Newcomer of the Year prior to the start of the season, going on to appear in all 35 games, starting 29. He was third in scoring for the Runnin' Rebels with 10.3 points per game, third in steals and assists with 0.9 and 2.3 per game respectively, and fourth in rebounds with 4.4 rebounds per game, leading his team in scoring five times and in rebounding twice. He made his debut on November 12, 2012, scoring 15 points, including hitting 3-of-4 three-pointers, in a win over Northern Arizona which was the first of 18 total games of scoring in double figures. He also dished out a career-high six assists in three different games, and exploded for a career-high 22 points on 7-of-11 shooting in a 76–75 win over California to help UNLV earn its best non-conference road win of the season. On February 9, 2014, he grabbed a career-high nine rebounds in a home win over New Mexico and made a career-high five three-pointers as part of a team-leading 19-point effort in the MW tournament's championship game on March 16, also against the Lobos. Five days later, he made his NCAA tournament debut against Cal, scoring a team-high 15 points in a 64–61 loss.

In 2014, Dejean-Jones transferred to Iowa State to play under coach Fred Hoiberg. Dejean-Jones played in 33 games during the 2014–15 season, starting 21, averaging 10.5 points, 4.7 rebounds, 2.1 assists and 1.1 steals, while shooting a career-best 47.6 percent from the field. He scored in double figures 17 times and earned CBSSports.com National Player of the Week honors after scoring a season-high 27 points in ISU's win against nationally ranked Arkansas. In that game, he was 8-for-8 from the field, becoming just the fifth player in school history with at least eight field goal attempts in a game without a miss. In his Cyclone debut, he recorded his first career double-double, finishing with 20 points and 11 rebounds against Oakland, and just missed a triple-double against Lamar, scoring 12 points to go along with 10 rebounds and a career-high eight assists. He helped the Cyclones win the 2015 Big 12 tournament.

=== College statistics ===
Year	Team	GP	GS	MPG	FG%	3P%	FT%	RPG	APG	SPG	BPG	PPG
2010–11	USC	18	10	20.6	.379	.345	.639	2.6	1.6	1.1	.1	7.6
2012–13	UNLV	35	28	26.0	.413	.347	.728	4.4	2.3	.9	.3	10.3
2013–14	UNLV	31	26	27.4	.427	.323	.643	3.7	3.0	.7	.3	13.6
2014–15	Iowa State	33	21	23.0	.476	.329	.722	4.7	2.1	1.1	.3	10.5
Career		117	85	24.7	.429	.336	.684	4.0	2.3	.9	.2	10.8

== Professional career ==
=== Idaho Stampede (2015–2016) ===
After going undrafted in the 2015 NBA draft, Dejean-Jones joined the New Orleans Pelicans for the 2015 NBA Summer League in Las Vegas, averaging 12.8 points in six games. On August 20, 2015, he signed with the Pelicans, but was later waived by the team on October 24 after appearing in seven preseason games. On December 13, he was acquired by the Idaho Stampede of the NBA Development League. He made his professional debut on December 19 in a 117–107 win over the Santa Cruz Warriors, recording 15 points, three rebounds, four assists and one steal in 21 minutes of action.

=== New Orleans Pelicans (2016) ===
On January 21, 2016, Dejean-Jones signed a 10-day contract with the Pelicans. On January 28, in his fourth game for the team, Dejean-Jones started at shooting guard in place of the injured Tyreke Evans. In 34 minutes of action, he recorded 14 points, 2 rebounds, 2 assists, 2 steals and 1 block, helping the Pelicans defeat the Sacramento Kings 114–105. On February 1, he signed a second 10-day contract, and continued to start for the Pelicans due to Evans' injury. On February 4, he had a career-best game with 17 points and 9 rebounds in a 99–96 loss to the Los Angeles Lakers. On February 19, he signed a three-year deal with the Pelicans. A week later, he was ruled out for the rest of the season after undergoing successful surgery to repair a right wrist fracture.

== Personal life ==
Dejean-Jones was the son of KC and Franchesca Jones, and had four brothers and two sisters. He graduated from UNLV with a degree in sociology and pursued a master's degree in family and consumer sciences – youth development. He had one daughter, Allicsia DeJean.

== Death ==
On May 28, 2016, Dejean-Jones was killed when he was shot after kicking open the locked front door and locked bedroom door of a Camden Belmont Dallas apartment which he mistakenly thought belonged to his girlfriend. He was visiting his girlfriend, who lived on the floor above, for their daughter's first birthday. Dejean-Jones intended to re-enter her apartment after leaving to take a walk following an argument with her, but instead went to another apartment one floor below his girlfriend's apartment on the fourth floor. At about 3:20 a.m., Dejean-Jones forced open the front door of the third-floor apartment. While shouting for his girlfriend, Dejean-Jones approached and kicked open the bedroom door within the apartment. The resident, who had been sleeping, thought that the person breaking in intended to harm him, so he proceeded to retrieve and fire a handgun in self defense at Dejean-Jones through the bedroom door, striking him in the abdomen. Dejean-Jones, at the age of 23, was pronounced dead at a Dallas hospital. According to his agent, this was the first time that Dejean-Jones visited his girlfriend's new apartment. Dejean-Jones was the first active NBA player to die since 2007 when Eddie Griffin was killed in a vehicular accident.

== NBA career statistics ==
Legend
GP	Games played	GS	Games started	MPG	Minutes per game
FG%	Field goal percentage	3P%	3-point field goal percentage	FT%	Free throw percentage
RPG	Rebounds per game	APG	Assists per game	SPG	Steals per game
BPG	Blocks per game	PPG	Points per game	**Bold**	Career high

=== Regular season ===
Year	Team	GP	GS	MPG	FG%	3P%	FT%	RPG	APG	SPG	BPG	PPG
2015–16	New Orleans	14	11	19.9	.406	.375	.524	3.4	1.1	.7	.1	5.6
Career		14	11	19.9	.406	.375	.524	3.4	1.1	.7	.1	5.6

== See also ==
- List of basketball players who died during their careers
