= Matt Thomas (basketball) =

American basketball player (born 1994)

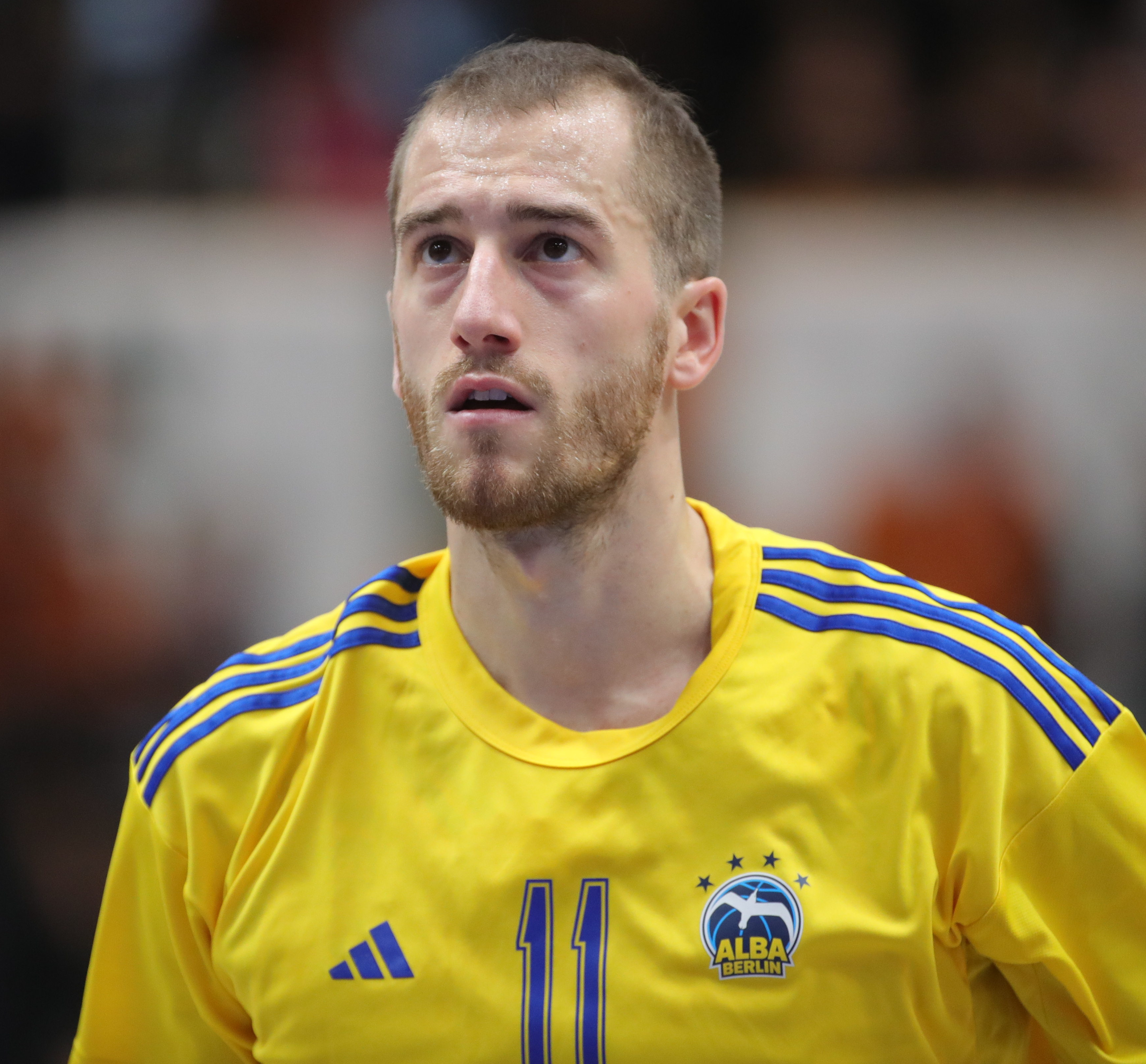
- Thomas with Alba Berlin in 2023

No. 21 – Rytas Vilnius
- Position: Shooting guard
- League: LKL; BCL

Personal information
- Born: August 4, 1994 (age 32) Decatur, Illinois, U.S.
- Listed height: 6 ft 3 in (1.91 m)
- Listed weight: 190 lb (86 kg)

Career information
- High school: Onalaska (Onalaska, Wisconsin)
- College: Iowa State (2013–2017)
- NBA draft: 2017: undrafted
- Playing career: 2017–present

Career history
- 2017–2018: Obradoiro
- 2018–2019: Valencia
- 2019–2021: Toronto Raptors
- 2021: Utah Jazz
- 2021–2022: Chicago Bulls
- 2023: Panathinaikos
- 2023–2025: Alba Berlin
- 2025–2026: Coviran Granada
- 2026: Beşiktaş
- 2026: Unicaja Málaga
- 2026–present: Rytas Vilnius

Career highlights
- EuroCup champion (2019); All-Bundesliga Second Team (2024)
- Stats at NBA.com
- Stats at Basketball Reference

Matthew William Thomas (born August 4, 1994) is an American professional basketball player for Rytas Vilnius of the Lietuvos krepšinio lyga (LKL), and the Basketball Champions League (BCL). He played college basketball for the Iowa State Cyclones before starting his professional career in Europe, then moving to the National Basketball Association (NBA), and back to Europe again.

== Early life ==
Matt Thomas was born in Decatur, Illinois. He grew up in Onalaska, Wisconsin, attending Onalaska High School. His mother had been a standout high school athlete herself. She was a swimmer, softball player, tennis player, and basketball star. She holds the school record for single game scoring at Wahlert High School in Dubuque, Iowa, with 48 points.

Thomas suffered tragedy at a young age. When he was 9 years old, his father, Greg, who suffered from alcoholism, died of suicide. Because of this, Thomas developed a very strong relationship with his mother.

Thomas was an outstanding high school basketball player. He was named first-team all-state by the Associated Press as a junior in 2012. He averaged 21.3 points, 5.3 rebounds, 2.5 assists and 2.1 steals in 2012 to lead his team to the Division 2 state championship. Onalaska ended the year with a 27–1 record. Thomas scored 30 points in the state championship game, a 55–38 victory over Kaukauna. His senior year Thomas averaged 28.3 points and 9.7 rebounds, leading his team to the state semifinals and a 24–3 mark, shooting 50.4% percent from the field and 35.8% from beyond the arc. Thomas scored more than 40 points three times, including 41 points in the sectional final and a career-high 50 points in just 2 1/2 quarters vs. Tomah. He participated in the 2013 American Family Insurance High School 3-Point Championship, finishing third. Thomas ended his four-year career as a two-time first-team all-state pick with a 95–12 overall mark and over 2,000 points.

An outstanding scorer, Thomas was considered one of the best shooters in the class of 2013 and one of the best players from Wisconsin. A consensus top-100 national recruit, Thomas was ranked No. 51 by ESPN, No. 54 by Rivals.com, and No. 58 by Scout.com in the final national rankings. Being highly sought after Thomas eventually chose Iowa State over Virginia, Minnesota, Boston College and Marquette.

College recruiting
Name	Hometown	School	Height	Weight	Commit date
Matt Thomas; G	Onalaska, WI	Onalaska High School (WI)	6 ft 3 in (1.91 m)	185 lb (84 kg)	Jun 14, 2012
Matt Thomas; G	Recruit ratings: Scout: Rivals: 247Sports: ESPN:				
Overall recruit ranking: Rivals: 54, 15 (G) ESPN: 51, 3 (WI), 12 (G)
Note: In many cases, Scout, Rivals, 247Sports, On3, and ESPN may conflict in their listings of height and weight.; In these cases, the average was taken. ESPN grades are on a 100-point scale.; Sources: "Iowa State 2013 Basketball Commitments". Rivals.; "2013 Iowa State Basketball Commits". Scout.; "ESPN". ESPN.; "Scout.com Team Recruiting Rankings". Scout.; "2013 Team Ranking". Rivals.

== College career ==
=== Freshman season ===
Thomas began his true freshman campaign as a starter for Iowa State. He is only the 20th ISU freshman to start a season opener. He started in the first 15 games before being replaced in the starting line-up by Monte Morris. Despite becoming the 6th man, Thomas still appeared in all 36 games that season. Over the season Thomas averaged 5.5 points, scored in double figures eight times, and shot 33.6% from behind the arc. He made four three-pointers in a game twice during the season. He made a three in 25 games with 44 three-pointers total, which is good enough for second-most by a Cyclone freshman.

=== Sophomore season ===
Thomas spent two days in jail following his arrest for an OWI on July 14, 2014. Thomas began his sophomore season serving a three-game suspension. Due to increased bench depth his sophomore season, Thomas saw a slightly diminished role. He saw action in 32 total games, scoring in double figures nine times. He was third on the team with 32 three-pointers made. Thomas grabbed a career-high eight rebounds and hit 5–6 shots to score 13 points against Alabama in the season opener. He led the Cyclones in scoring for the first time in his career against Lamar, with 14 points. He scored a career-high 17 points at Texas, included 4–6 from the three-point range.

=== Junior season ===
Due to the season-ending injury of Naz Long, Thomas moved back into the starting lineup.

== Professional career ==
=== Obradoiro CAB (2017–2018) ===
Thomas played for the Los Angeles Lakers 2017 summer league team. He scored 23 points on 8–9 shooting in the summer league title game to help the Lakers to a 110–98 victory.

On August 29, 2017, Thomas signed with Monbus Obradoiro of Spain's Liga ACB. In his first professional game of his career, Thomas recorded 21 points in 4-for-5 shooting from three-point line as he helped Obradoiro win against Zaragoza.

=== Valencia (2018–2019) ===
On July 11, 2018, Thomas signed a two-year deal with Valencia of Spain's Liga ACB. He had an effective field goal percentage of 99 percent on catch-and-shoot attempts when unguarded, picking up the nickname Mr. 99%.

=== Toronto Raptors (2019–2021) ===
On July 19, 2019, Thomas signed with the Toronto Raptors. On October 26, 2019, Thomas made his NBA debut, scoring six points and grabbing three rebounds, in the Raptors 108–84 win over the Chicago Bulls. On November 25, Thomas suffered a fractured finger on his left hand. He returned to action on January 6, 2020, suiting up on a rehab assignment for the Raptors 905, the Raptors' NBA G League affiliate. On January 7, Thomas returned to the Raptors lineup recording eight points and a career-high six rebounds in the Raptors' 101–99 loss to the Portland Trail Blazers. On February 8, Thomas scored a career-high 15 points in a 119–118 win over the Brooklyn Nets. On February 23, Thomas bested his career high with 17 points and five 3-pointers in a 127–81 victory against the Indiana Pacers. In the Raptors’ sixth game returning from the suspension of the season due to the COVID-19 pandemic on August 10, Thomas scored a career-high 22 points, hitting 4 three-pointers, in a 114–106 win over the Milwaukee Bucks in the Orlando bubble.

=== Utah Jazz (2021) ===
On March 25, 2021, the Raptors traded Thomas to the Utah Jazz for a future second-round draft pick. On April 28, Thomas scored a season-high 17 points on 7-of-7 shooting from the field and 1-of-1 from the three in a 154–105 win over the Sacramento Kings. On August 1, he was waived by the Jazz.

=== Chicago Bulls (2021–2022) ===
On September 8, 2021, Thomas signed with the Chicago Bulls. With 13 players out of the lineup due to COVID-19 protocols in December, Thomas saw increased playing time. On December 26, he played 19 minutes, scoring five points, in a 113–105 victory over the Indiana Pacers. The following day, he made three critical 3-pointers in 19 minutes on the floor in a 130–118 victory over the Atlanta Hawks.

=== Panathinaikos (2023) ===
On January 31, 2023, Thomas made his return to Europe for Panathinaikos of the Greek Basket League and the EuroLeague, signing a contract through 2024, with the second season being a team option. In 10 EuroLeague games (5 starts), he averaged 8.1 points and 2 rebounds (shooting with 40% from the 3-point line) in 18 minutes per contest. Thomas appeared in only one game in domestic competition due to the Greek league's restrictions on foreign players. On July 15, Panathinaikos opted out of their mutual contract and Thomas became a free agent.

=== Alba Berlin (2023–2025) ===
On August 7, 2023, Thomas signed a one-year contract with German club Alba Berlin. The deal reportedly included a buy-out clause for EuroLeague clubs.

=== Granada (2025–2026) ===
On August 31, 2025, Thomas signed with Granada of the Liga ACB. On January 11, 2026, Thomas activated his contract's release clause and left Granada.

=== Beşiktaş (2026) ===
On January 11, 2026, Beşiktaş Gain of the BSL and EuroCup announced Thomas as a new player.

== Career statistics ==
Legend
GP	Games played	GS	Games started	MPG	Minutes per game
FG%	Field-goal percentage	3P%	3-point field-goal percentage	FT%	Free-throw percentage
RPG	Rebounds per game	APG	Assists per game	SPG	Steals per game
BPG	Blocks per game	PPG	Points per game	PIR	Performance index rating
**Bold**	Career high

=== NBA ===
==== Regular season ====
Year	Team	GP	GS	MPG	FG%	3P%	FT%	RPG	APG	SPG	BPG	PPG
2019–20	Toronto	**41**	**1**	10.7	**.487**	**.475**	.750	**1.5**	**.5**	**.2**	.0	**4.9**
2020–21	Toronto	26	0	7.4	.387	.415	**.857**	.8	.3	.1	—	2.7
2020–21	Utah	19	0	7.1	.400	.256	**.857**	1.2	**.5**	.1	—	3.6
2021–22	Chicago	40	0	**11.5**	.410	.385	.800	1.2	**.5**	**.2**	**.1**	4.0
Career		126	1	9.7	.433	.404	.804	1.2	.5	.2	.0	4.0

==== Playoffs ====
Year	Team	GP	GS	MPG	FG%	3P%	FT%	RPG	APG	SPG	BPG	PPG
2020	Toronto	**10**	0	**8.4**	**.619**	**.417**	—	**1.4**	**.7**	**.1**	**.1**	**3.1**
2021	Utah	3	0	2.3	.000	—	—	.3	—	—	—	0.0
Career		13	0	7.0	.565	.417	—	1.1	.5	.1	.1	2.4

=== EuroLeague ===
Year	Team	GP	GS	MPG	FG%	3P%	FT%	RPG	APG	SPG	BPG	PPG	PIR
2022–23	Panathinaikos	10	5	18.3	**.448**	.405	.750	**2.0**	.4	**.6**	—	8.1	6.7
2023–24	Alba Berlin	**30**	**19**	**22.0**	**.448**	**.432**	**.889**	**2.0**	**1.6**	.5	—	**10.1**	**8.0**
Career		40	24	21.1	.448	.426	.846	2.0	1.3	.5	—	9.6	7.6

=== EuroCup ===
Year	Team	GP	GS	MPG	FG%	3P%	FT%	RPG	APG	SPG	BPG	PPG	PIR
2018–19	Valencia	23	9	22.1	.518	.477	.909	1.3	1.7	.5	—	12.7	10.9
Career		23	9	22.1	.518	.477	.909	1.3	1.7	.5	—	12.7	10.9

=== Domestic leagues ===
Year	Team	League	GP	MPG	FG%	3P%	FT%	RPG	APG	SPG	BPG	PPG
2018–19	(Spain) Valencia	ACB	29	20.4	.511	.485	.846	1.5	1.6	.4	.0	11.4
2019–20	(United States) Raptors 905	G League	1	34.4	.368	.250	1.000	10.0	4.0	—	—	18.0
2022–23	(Greece) Panathinaikos	GBL	1	16.3	.333	.400	—	2.0	—	1.0	—	6.0
2023–24	(Germany) Alba Berlin	BBL	37	23.3	.488	.453	.891	2.4	1.9	.7	.0	13.1

=== College ===
Year	Team	GP	GS	MPG	FG%	3P%	FT%	RPG	APG	SPG	BPG	PPG
2013–14	Iowa State	**36**	15	21.2	.367	.336	.667	1.1	1.1	.6	**.2**	5.5
2014–15	Iowa State	32	0	15.3	.368	.330	.714	2	.7	.3	.1	4.9
2015–16	Iowa State	35	27	**33.6**	.440	.432	**.902**	**4.4**	**1.7**	.8	**.2**	11.0
2016–17	Iowa State	35	**34**	30.9	**.477**	**.445**	.891	3.9	**1.7**	**.9**	.1	**12.3**
Career		138	76	25.4	.427	.401	.815	3.1	1.3	.7	.1	8.5
