= Jameel McKay =

American basketball player (born 1992)

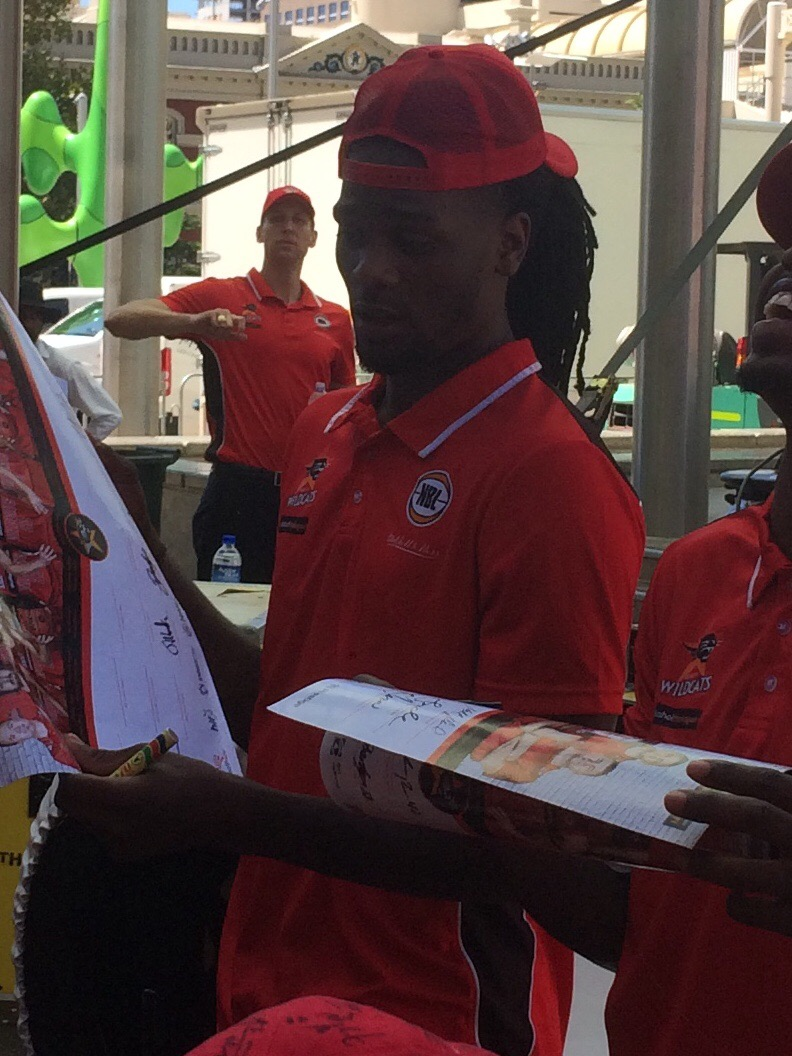
- McKay in March 2017

Personal information
- Born: September 14, 1992 (age 33) Milwaukee, Wisconsin, U.S.
- Listed height: 6 ft 9 in (2.06 m)
- Listed weight: 212 lb (96 kg)

Career information
- High school: Pulaski (Milwaukee, Wisconsin)
- College: Indian Hills CC (2011–2013); Iowa State (2014–2016)
- NBA draft: 2016: undrafted
- Playing career: 2016–2020
- Position: Power forward / center

Career history
- 2016–2017: Perth Wildcats
- 2017: Phoenix Fuel Masters
- 2018: Shimane Susanoo Magic
- 2018: Neptūnas Klaipėda
- 2018: Windy City Bulls
- 2019: Breiðablik
- 2019: Hanoi Buffaloes
- 2019–2020: KB Ylli
- 2020: Singapore Slingers
- 2020: KB Ylli

Career highlights
- NBL champion (2017); Big 12 Defensive Player of the Year (2015); Third-team All-Big 12 (2015); Big 12 All-Defensive Team (2015); Big 12 All-Newcomer Team (2015); 2× First-team NJCAA All-American (2012, 2013)

Jameel McKay (born September 14, 1992) is an American former professional basketball player. He played two seasons of college basketball for Iowa State, where as a junior in 2014–15, he was named Big 12 Defensive Player of the Year when he averaged 2.4 blocked shots per game. In 2017, he won an NBL championship with the Perth Wildcats.

== College career ==
=== Indian Hills Community College (2011–2013) ===
After high school, McKay attended Indian Hills Community College for two years, becoming the first player in school history to be named NJCAA First-Team All-American twice. He helped the Warriors go 59–8 during his two years on the team, and played in the national tournament in 2011–12 where he was named to the all-tournament team. He was a two-time first-team all-region pick, and finished his career with 1,022 points, averaging 16.2 points and 8.9 rebounds per game. He scored in double-figures in all but four games in his career (59-of-63).

=== Iowa State (2013–2016) ===
McKay committed to Marquette for the 2013–14 season. However, in October 2013, he left Marquette before playing in a game for the Golden Eagles, and the following month, he transferred to Iowa State.

After sitting out the 2013–14 season due to NCAA transfer regulations, McKay joined the Cyclones as a junior for the 2014–15 season. He played in 25 games and made 12 starts in 2014–15 after becoming eligible on December 20, 2014. On February 25, 2015, he scored a season-high 21 points against Baylor. Over three Big 12 tournament games, McKay averaged 9.0 points and 8.7 rebounds per game, as the Cyclones won their second consecutive Big 12 tournament title. In their first game of the NCAA Tournament, the Cyclones were defeated 60–59 by UAB, as McKay recorded 10 points, 12 rebounds and six blocked shots in the loss. On the season, he averaged 11.0 points and led the team with 7.6 rebounds and 2.4 blocks per game. His 59 blocks was the third most by any Iowa State junior, and his 2.4 blocks per game was second among league players in Big 12 games and was the third-best average by any Cyclone in school history, trailing only Kelvin Cato. McKay subsequently earned Big 12 Defensive Player of the Year honors.

As a senior in 2015–16, McKay saw action in 32 games, making 28 starts. He ranked fourth on the team in scoring with 11.1 points and led the team with 8.8 rebounds and 1.7 blocks. He was second among Big 12 players shooting 60.5 percent from the field and finished his career second all-time among ISU players shooting 59.6 percent from the floor in his career. His 114 career blocks were the sixth-most in school history. In just the second game of the season, McKay scored a career-high 25 points against Chicago State. On December 14, 2015, he was named Big 12 Co-Player of the Week after averaging 17 points and 10 rebounds in three wins against Buffalo, Iowa and Arkansas-Pine Bluff. The Cyclones returned to the NCAA Tournament in 2016 and made it through to the Sweet 16, where they lost to Virginia.

=== College statistics ===
Year	Team	GP	GS	MPG	FG%	3P%	FT%	RPG	APG	SPG	BPG	PPG
2014–15	Iowa State	25	12	27.2	.583	.000	.598	7.6	.6	.8	2.4	11.0
2015–16	Iowa State	32	28	30.5	.605	.000	.535	8.8	.9	.5	1.7	11.1
Career		57	40	29.0	.596	.000	.569	8.3	.7	.6	2.0	11.1

== Professional career ==
=== 2016 NBA Summer League ===
After going undrafted in the 2016 NBA draft, McKay joined the New Orleans Pelicans for the 2016 NBA Summer League. In three games for the Pelicans, he averaged 7.3 points, 6.3 rebounds and 1.3 blocks in 15.2 minutes per game.

=== Perth Wildcats (2016–2017) ===
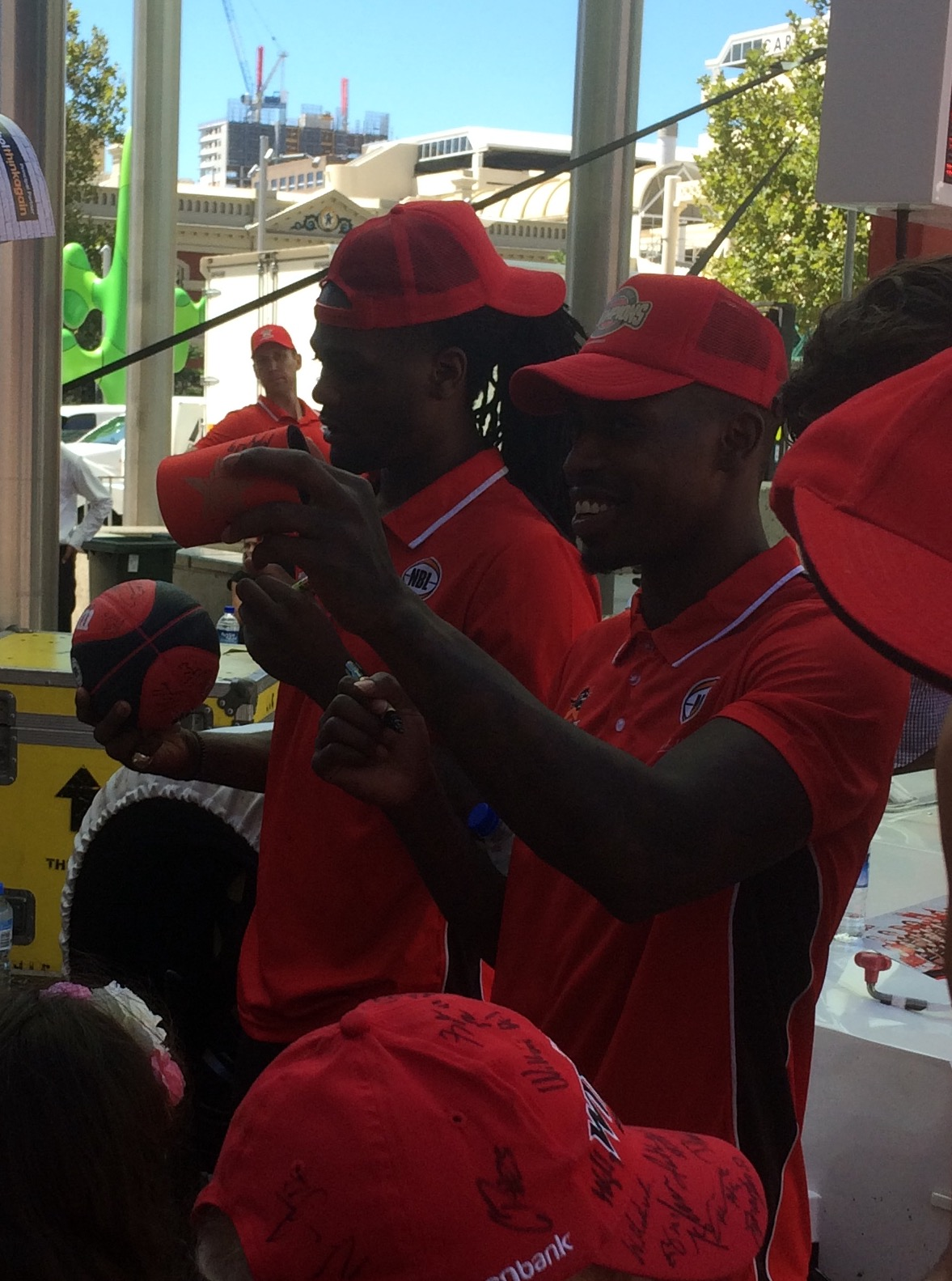
McKay (left) developed a lifelong friendship with fellow American Casey Prather (right) during the 2016–17 season.

On August 2, 2016, McKay signed with the Perth Wildcats of the Australian National Basketball League for the 2016–17 season. He made his debut for the Wildcats in their season opener on October 6, recording 18 points, seven rebounds and three blocks in a 72–65 loss to the Brisbane Bullets. On January 7, 2017, he scored a season-high 19 points in an 80–74 victory over the Sydney Kings. Two days later, he recorded a season-high 13 rebounds in a 72–68 win over the Bullets. In the Wildcats' regular-season finale on February 12, McKay recorded 14 points and 10 rebounds in a 96–94 win over Melbourne United. The win propelled the Wildcats into the playoffs as they finished in third place with a 15–13 record. The Wildcats went on to sweep the Cairns Taipans in the best-of-three semi-finals, before sweeping the Illawarra Hawks in the best-of-five grand final series to win the NBL championship. In Game 2, McKay had nine rebounds in the third quarter. In the 95–86 title-clinching Game 3 win, McKay had eight points and seven rebounds. In 33 games for the Wildcats, he averaged 7.8 points, 6.4 rebounds, 1.0 assists and 1.4 blocks per game.

=== Phoenix Fuel Masters (2017) ===
On March 20, 2017, McKay signed with the Phoenix Fuel Masters of the Philippine Basketball Association as an import for the 2017 PBA Commissioner's Cup. He made his debut for Phoenix two days later, recording 34 points, 20 rebounds and four blocks in a 101–82 loss to the Star Hotshots. On April 1, 2017, he recorded 15 points and season highs of 28 rebounds and 3 steals in a 94–91 win over Barangay Ginebra San Miguel. On April 21, 2017, he scored a season-high 42 points to go with 22 rebounds in a 94–86 loss to the Alaska Aces. In 11 games for Phoenix, he averaged 23.8 points, 17.3 rebounds, 2.6 assists, 1.1 steals and 2.1 blocks per game.

=== Unsuccessful 2017 stints ===
On June 9, 2017, McKay signed with Bilbao Basket of the Spanish Liga ACB. On September 14, 2017, the club parted ways with McKay for bureaucratic reasons.

On October 23, 2017, McKay signed with Al Mouttahed Tripoli of the Lebanese Basketball League. He left the team before appearing in a game for them.

=== Shimane Susanoo Magic (2018) ===
On January 19, 2018, McKay signed with the Shimane Susanoo Magic of the Japanese B.League. On February 28, 2018, he was released by Shimane under mutual agreement. In 10 games, he averaged 2.5 points and 5.4 rebounds per game.

=== Neptūnas Klaipėda (2018) ===
In March 2018, McKay signed with Neptūnas Klaipėda of the Lithuanian Basketball League. In five games, he averaged 2.6 points and 4.0 rebounds per game.

=== Windy City Bulls (2018) ===
In October 2018, McKay was added to the training camp roster of the Windy City Bulls of the NBA G League. He was waived on November 9 after appearing in two games.

=== Breiðablik (2019) ===
In January 2019, McKay had a three-game stint with Breiðablik of the Icelandic Úrvalsdeild karla. He suffered a concussion in his third appearance. In the three games, he averaged 10.3 points and 9.0 rebounds.

=== Hanoi Buffaloes (2019) ===
In June 2019, McKay had a four-game stint with the Hanoi Buffaloes of the Vietnam Basketball Association. He later signed with Blackwater Elite for the 2019 PBA Commissioner's Cup, but was quickly replaced before appearing in a game after being deemed not in playing shape and having been outplayed in practice.

=== KB Ylli and Singapore Slingers (2019–2020) ===
In August 2019, McKay signed with KB Ylli of the Kosovo Basketball Superleague. He requested release from Ylli in March 2020. In 21 games, he averaged 12.3 points, 10.0 rebounds, 1.4 assists and 1.3 blocks per game.

Upon parting ways with Ylli, McKay joined the Singapore Slingers of the ASEAN Basketball League. He only played one game for the Slingers before the season was cancelled due to the COVID-19 pandemic.

In October 2020, McKay returned to KB Ylli for the 2020–21 season. His contract was terminated on December 1, 2020, after he appeared in four games.

In August 2021, McKay signed with Argentino de Junín of the Liga Nacional de Básquet. He left the team before playing in a game for them.
