= Will Blalock =

American basketball player (born 1983)

Personal information
- Born: September 8, 1983 (age 43) Boston, Massachusetts, U.S.
- Listed height: 6 ft 1 in (1.85 m)
- Listed weight: 200 lb (91 kg)

Career information
- High school: East Boston (East Boston, Massachusetts); Notre Dame Prep (Fitchburg, Massachusetts)
- College: Iowa State (2003–2006)
- NBA draft: 2006: 2nd round, 60th overall pick
- Drafted by: Detroit Pistons
- Playing career: 2006–2013
- Position: Point guard
- Number: 8

Career history
- 2006–2007: Detroit Pistons
- 2007: Sioux Falls Skyforce
- 2007: Hapoel Jerusalem
- 2007–2008: Anaheim Arsenal
- 2008–2009: Artland Dragons
- 2009–2010: Maine Red Claws
- 2010: Reno Bighorns
- 2010–2011: Townsville Crocodiles
- 2011: Saint John Mill Rats
- 2012: Reno Bighorns
- 2012: Huracanes del Atlántico
- 2012–2013: Reno Bighorns
- 2013: Saint John Mill Rats
- Stats at NBA.com
- Stats at Basketball Reference

William Anthony Blalock (born September 8, 1983) is an American former professional basketball player.

== Early years ==
Blalock played basketball at East Boston High School, but later graduated from Notre Dame Preparatory School in 2003. He then attended Iowa State University and played for the Cyclones from 2003 to 2006, making one NCAA Tournament appearance in 2005, playing under coach Wayne Morgan. Blalock declared for the NBA draft after his junior year.

== Professional career ==
Blalock was selected by the Detroit Pistons in the second round with the last pick (60th overall) in the 2006 NBA draft. In the 2006-07 season, he averaged 11.9 minutes, 1.8 points, 1.1 rebounds, and 1.2 assists per game, under coach Flip Saunders. Blalock played a total of fourteen games during that season, which marked his only season in the league. His final NBA game was a 96–75 win over the Philadelphia 76ers, where he played just over six minutes, and recorded 2 points and 2 rebounds.

Blalock continued to play professional basketball outside of the NBA over the course of his career. In 2007, he was assigned by the Pistons to play for the Sioux Falls Skyforce in the NBA G League. That same year, he also transferred overseas to play for Hapoel Jerusalem of the Israeli Basketball Premier League, but soon returned to the G League, instead with the Anaheim Arsenal.

In 2008, Blalock once again went overseas. This time, he signed for the Artland Dragons of the Basketball Bundesliga in Germany. In the following season, the G League called again as he joined the Maine Red Claws from 2009 to 2010, and then the Reno Bighorns in the latter part of the season.

In the 2010–11 season, Blalock signed for the Townsville Crocodiles of the National Basketball League in Australia, and then for the Saint John Mill Rats of the National Basketball League of Canada. In the following season, he once again returned to the Reno Bighorns, but soon moved on to the Huracanes del Atlántico of the Liga Nacional de Baloncesto in the Dominican Republic.

In Blalock's final professional season in 2012–13, he rejoined his former teams, the Bighorns and the Mill Rats.
