= 2015–16 UMKC Kangaroos men's basketball team =

American college basketball season

2015–16 UMKC Kangaroos men's basketball
- Conference: Western Athletic Conference
- Record: 12–19 (4–10 WAC)
- Head coach: Kareem Richardson (3rd season)
- Associate head coach: Angres Thorpe (3rd season)
- Assistant coaches: Andre McGee (2nd season); Chris Hollender (1st season)
- Home arena: Municipal Auditorium

2015–16 WAC men's basketball standings
	Conf.				Overall
Team	W		L	PCT	W		L	PCT
New Mexico State	13	–	1	.929	23	–	11	.676
Grand Canyon *	11	–	3	.786	27	–	7	.794
Cal State Bakersfield †	11	–	3	.786	24	–	9	.727
Seattle	7	–	7	.500	15	–	17	.469
Utah Valley	6	–	8	.429	12	–	18	.400
UMKC	4	–	10	.286	12	–	19	.387
Texas–Rio Grande Valley	4	–	10	.286	8	–	22	.267
Chicago State	0	–	14	.000	4	–	28	.125
† 2016 WAC tournament winner * Ineligible for postseason during transition to Division I.

The 2015–16 UMKC Kangaroos men's basketball team represented the University of Missouri–Kansas City during the 2015–16 NCAA Division I men's basketball season. The Kangaroos, led by third year head coach Kareem Richardson, played their home games off-campus at Municipal Auditorium in Kansas City, Missouri as a member of the Western Athletic Conference (WAC).

They finished the season 12–19, 4–10 in WAC play to finish in a tie for sixth place. They were victorious over the Utah Valley University in the WAC tournament quarterfinal but were defeated by New Mexico State University in the semifinal.

== Previous season ==
The Kangaroos finished the 2014–15 season with a record of 14–19 overall, 8–6 in conference to finish in a tie for second place.

== Offseason ==
=== Departures ===
Pos.	#	Name	Height	Weight	Year	Hometown	Notes
F	5	Reese Holliday	6'4"	215	RS Sr	Kansas City, KS	Graduated
G	13	Frank Williams, Jr.	6'6"	175	Sr	Kansas City, MO	Graduated
G	1	Kevin Franceschi	6'4"	190	Jr	Argenteuil, France	Graduated, Oklahoma Baptist
G	4	Mason Wedel	6'1"	180	RS So	Shawnee, KS	Injury
F	35	Juan Ramon Rivas	6'8"	200	RS Fr	Orlando, FL	North Georgia
G	11	Collin Jennings	6'4"	175	Fr	Harrah, OK	Southwestern Oklahoma State
G	3	Brandyn Moultrie	6'2"	170	Fr	Liberty, MO	Personal
G	2	Deshon Taylor	6'3"	165	Fr	Riverside, CA	Fresno State

=== Incoming transfers ===
Pos.	#	Name	Height	Weight	Year	Previous School	Hometown
F	2	Ikem Eriobuna	6'9"	210	Jr	Otero JC	Lagos, Nigeria
F	3	Kyle Steward	6'7"	160	Jr	Butler CC	Detroit, MI
G	10	Wyatt Voorhees	6'1"	185	So	Drury	Shawnee, KS

=== 2015 incoming recruits ===
College recruiting information
Name	Hometown	School	Height	Weight	Commit date
Grant Leach; G	Fishers, IN	Air Force Academy Preparatory	6 ft 4 in (1.93 m)	175 lb (79 kg)	May 2, 2015
Grant Leach; G	Recruit ratings: Scout: Rivals: 247Sports: (NR)				
Aleer Leek; C	Juba, South Sudan	Victory Rock Prep	6 ft 9 in (2.06 m)	220 lb (100 kg)	
Aleer Leek; C	Recruit ratings: Scout: Rivals: 247Sports: (NR)				
Overall recruit ranking:
Note: In many cases, Scout, Rivals, 247Sports, On3, and ESPN may conflict in their listings of height and weight.; In these cases, the average was taken. ESPN grades are on a 100-point scale.; Sources: "2015 Team Ranking". Rivals.

== Roster ==
2015–16 UMKC Kangaroos men's basketball team
Players
Coaches

Pos.	#	Name	Height	Weight	Year	Previous school	Hometown
F	22	Shayok Shayok	6 ft 9 in (2.06 m)	225 lb (102 kg)	RS Sr	Bradley; IMG Academy/ Percy L. Julian HS/ St. Patrick's HS	Ottawa, Ontario
C	21	Thaddeus Smith	6 ft 9 in (2.06 m)	245 lb (111 kg)	Sr	Weatherford/ Seward County CC; Ideal Academy	Washington, D. C.
G/F	25	Broderick Newbill	6 ft 5 in (1.96 m)	190 lb (86 kg)	RS Jr	Fresno State; Hogan Preparatory	Kansas City, MO
G	4	LaVell Boyd	6 ft 0 in (1.83 m)	175 lb (79 kg)	Jr	South Suburban; Farragut Career	Chicago, IL
F	2	Ikem Eriobuna	6 ft 9 in (2.06 m)	220 lb (100 kg)	Jr	Otero JC/ Polk State; Evelyn Mack Academy	Lagos, Nigeria
G	12	Martez Harrison	5 ft 11 in (1.8 m)	200 lb (91 kg)	Jr	Brewster / University	Kansas City, MO
G/F	1	Dashawn King	6 ft 3 in (1.91 m)	195 lb (88 kg)	Jr	Erie CC; Scholarship and Entrepreneurship	Bronx, NY
F	3	Kyle Steward	6 ft 7 in (2.01 m)	195 lb (88 kg)	Jr	Butler CC/ Youngstown State; Cass Technical HS	Detroit, MI
C	54	Darnell Tillman	6 ft 8 in (2.03 m)	265 lb (120 kg)	Jr	Florida State–Jacksonville/ Southern Idaho; University City HS	St. Louis, MO
G/F	23	Darius Austin	6 ft 6 in (1.98 m)	220 lb (100 kg)	So	Cahokia HS	Centreville, IL
G	42	Noah Knight	6 ft 1 in (1.85 m)	200 lb (91 kg)	So	Olathe South HS	Olathe KS
G	10	Wyatt Voorhes (W) (redshirt)	6 ft 1 in (1.85 m)	185 lb (84 kg)	So	Drury; Mill Valley HS	Shawnee, KS
G	11	Grant Leach	6 ft 3 in (1.91 m)	190 lb (86 kg)	Fr	Air Force Preparatory/ Hamilton Southeastern HS	Fishers, IN
F/C	30	Aleer Leek	6 ft 9 in (2.06 m)	220 lb (100 kg)	Fr	Victory Rock Prep/ IMG Academy	Juba, South Sudan

Head coach

- Kareem Richardson (Evansville)

Assistant coach(es)

- Angres Thorpe (Saint Leo)
- Andre McGee (Louisville)
- Chris Hollender (Evansville)

Legend

- (C) Team captain
- (S) Suspended
- (I) Ineligible
- (W) Walk-on
- (5Y) Fifth-year Senior
- Injured
- Current redshirt

Roster
Last update: November 3, 2024

== Schedule & Results ==
Date time, TV	Rank^{#}	Opponent^{#}	Result	Record	High points	High rebounds	High assists	Site (attendance) city, state
Exhibition Season
November 9, 2015*; 7:05 PM		Hawaii Pacific	W 72–61		20 – Harrison	8 – Steward	4 – Harrison	Municipal Auditorium (908); Kansas City, MO
Non–Conference Regular Season
November 13, 2015*; 8:00 PM, BTN+		at Minnesota	L 58–76	0–1	25 – Boyd	8 – Austin	6 – Harrison	Williams Arena (9,744); Minneapolis, MN
November 15, 2015*; 6:05 PM		William Jewell	W 73–59	1–1	17 – Harrison	5 – Smith, King	6 – Harrison	Municipal Auditorium (1,127); Kansas City, MO
November 17, 2015*; 7:00 PM, KSMO–TV		at Omaha	L 89–95 ^{OT}	1–2	18 – Harrison	10 – Austin	11 – Harrison	Baxter Arena (1,278); Omaha, NE
November 21, 2015*; 7:00 PM		at Drake	W 79–73	2–2	16 – Boyd	8 – Shayok	4 – Harrison, Austin	The Knapp Center (2,862); Des Moines, IA
November 25, 2015*; 7:05 PM		Lincoln (Missouri)	W 73–72	3–2	17 – Harrison	7 – Harrison	4 – Boyd, Austin	Municipal Auditorium (973); Kansas City, MO
November 28, 2015*; 12:05 PM, WAC.tv		South Dakota State	W 64–57	4–2	25 – Harrison	5 – Steward	6 – Harrison	Municipal Auditorium (911); Kansas City, MO
December 1, 2015*; 7:05 PM		Tennessee–Martin	W 74–70	5–2	24 – Harrison	7 – Tillman	5 – Harrison	Municipal Auditorium (798); Kansas City, MO
December 5, 2015*; 2:00 PM, ESPN3		at Iowa	L 75–95	5–3	15 – Harrison	6 – Shayok, King, Tillman	4 – Harrison	Carver–Hawkeye Arena (11,763); Iowa City, IA
December 8, 2015*; 7:00 PM		at South Dakota	L 70–79	5–4	25 – Boyd	7 – Newbill	5 – Harrison	DakotaDome (1,423); Vermillion, SD
December 12, 2015*; 4:05 PM, ASN		Mississippi State	W 72–67	6–4	21 – Harrison	8 – Shayok	4 – Harrison	Municipal Auditorium (2,866); Kansas City, MO
December 19, 2015*; 3:35 PM, KSMO–TV		Rockhurst	W 71–60	7–4	16 – Harrison	5 – King	5 – Harrison	Municipal Auditorium (1,356); Kansas City, MO
December 22, 2015*; 7:00 PM, ACC RSN		at No. 16 Louisville; Billy Minardi Classic	L 47–75	7–5	12 – Harrison	8 – Tillman	2 – Boyd, King	KFC Yum! Center (19,419); Louisville, KY
December 23, 2015*; 3:15 PM		vs. UNC Wilmington; Billy Minardi Classic	L 56–76	7–6	16 – Austin	7 – Harrison	3 – Harrison	KFC Yum! Center (19,147); Louisville, KY
December 29, 2015*; 6:00 PM, FSOK+		at Oklahoma State	L 43–61	7–7	12 – Boyd, King	7 – Shayok, Newbill	3 – Harrison, Austin	Gallagher–Iba Arena (5,150); Stillwater, OK
January 2, 2016*; 1:00 PM		at USC Upstate	L 68–70	7–8	21 – Harrison	6 – Shayok	6 – Harrison	G. B. Hodge Center (270); Spartanburg, SC
Conference Regular Season
January 7, 2016; 7:05 PM, KSMO–TV		Seattle	W 84–69	8–8 (1–0)	21 – Harrison	11 – Shayok	4 – Boyd	Municipal Auditorium (1,147); Kansas City, MO
January 9, 2016; 7:05 PM, WAC.tv		CSU Bakersfield	L 72–83	8–9 (1–1)	19 – Harrison	5 – Harrison	5 – Harrison	Municipal Auditorium (1,786); Kansas City, MO
January 14, 2016; 8:00 PM, ASN		at New Mexico State	L 64–65	8–10 (1–2)	23 – Harrison	6 – Boyd	4 – Harrison	Pan American Center (4,187); Las Cruces, NM
January 16, 2016; 7:00 PM, WAC.tv		at Texas–Rio Grande Valley	L 66–71	8–11 (1–3)	15 – Austin	5 – Shayok, Boyd	3 – King	UTRGV Fieldhouse (1,189); Edinburg, TX
January 21, 2016; 7:05 PM, KSMO–TV		Utah Valley	L 79–90	8–12 (1–4)	21 – Shayok	9 – Shayok	5 – King	Municipal Auditorium (957); Kansas City, MO
January 23, 2016; 7:05 PM, ASN		Grand Canyon	L 78–85	8–13 (1–5)	20 – Harrison	10 – Steward	5 – Harrison	Municipal Auditorium (2,186); Kansas City, MO
January 30, 2016; 2:05 PM, WAC.tv		Chicago State	W 78–64	9–13 (2–5)	22 – Boyd	11 – Steward	7 – Harrison	Municipal Auditorium (1,526); Kansas City, MO
February 4, 2016; 9:00 PM		at CSU Bakersfield	L 66–77	9–14 (2–6)	21 – Harrison	5 – Smith	3 – King	Jimmie and Marjorie; Icardo Center (1,498); Bakersfield, CA
February 6, 2016; 9:00 PM, ASN		at Seattle	L 55–65	9–15 (2–7)	22 – Harrison	8 – Steward	3 – Harrison	KeyArena (2,260); Seattle, WA
February 13, 2016; 2:05 PM, WAC.tv		Texas–Rio Grande Valley	W 75–58	10–15 (3–7)	17 – King	12 – Shayok	5 – Boyd	Municipal Auditorium (1,670); Kansas City, MO
February 18, 2016; 8:00 PM, WAC.tv		at Grand Canyon	L 66–78	10–16 (3–8)	18 – Harrison	7 – Tillman	2 – Harrison	GCU Arena (6,049); Phoenix, AZ
February 20, 2016; 8:00 PM, KSMO–TV		at Utah Valley	L 70–79	10–17 (3–9)	18 – King	9 – Harrison	4 – Harrison	UCCU Center (2,981); Orem, UT
February 27, 2016; 2:05 PM, KSMO–TV		New Mexico State	L 61–62	10–18 (3–10)	20 – Harrison	9 – Steward	6 – Harrison	Municipal Auditorium (2,551); Kansas City, MO
March 5, 2016; 2:05 PM, KSMO–TV		at Chicago State	W 82–53	11–18 (4–10)	26 – Boyd	6 – Smith	7 – Harrison	Emil and Patricia; Jones Convocation Center (1,957); Chicago, IL
Conference Tournament
March 10, 2016*; 4:00 PM, WAC.tv	(5)	vs. (4) Utah Valley [Quarterfinal]	W 80–78	12–18	24 – Harrison	16 – Austin	3 – Harrison, Austin	Orleans Arena (1,472); Paradise, NV
March 11, 2016*; 8:00 PM, WAC.tv	(5)	vs. (1) New Mexico State [Semifinal]	L 64–78	12–19	23 – Boyd	5 – Harrison, Steward	3 – Boyd	Orleans Arena (1,723); Paradise, NV
*Non-conference game. ^{#}Rankings from AP Poll. (#) Tournament seedings in parentheses. All times are in Central Standard Time (CST).
