= List of Cal State Bakersfield Roadrunners men's basketball head coaches =

The following is a list of Cal State Bakersfield Roadrunners men's basketball head coaches. There have been eight head coaches of the Roadrunners in their 52-season history.

Cal State Bakersfield's current head coach is Rod Barnes. He was hired in March 2011 to replace Keith Brown, whose contract was not renewed following the 2010–11 season.

No.	Tenure	Coach	Years	Record	Pct.
1	1971–1975	Jim Larson	4	66–39	.629
2	1975–1981	Pat Wennihan	6	83–77	.519
3	1981–1983	Bobby Dye	2	50–11	.820
4	1983–1987	Jim Parks	4	75–36	.676
5	1987–1997	Pat Douglass	10	257–61	.808
6	1997–2005	Henry Clark	8	146–41	.781
7	2005–2011	Keith Brown	6	68–105	.393
8	2011–present	Rod Barnes	12	182–193	.485
Totals		8 coaches	52 seasons	927–563	.622
Records updated through end of 2022–23 season Source
