= 2015–16 Saint Mary's Gaels men's basketball team =

American college basketball season

2015–16 Saint Mary's Gaels men's basketball

WCC regular season co-champion

NIT, Quarterfinals
- Conference: West Coast Conference
- Record: 29–6 (15–3 WCC)
- Head coach: Randy Bennett (15th season)
- Assistant coaches: Marty Clarke; Marcus Schroeder; David Carter
- Home arena: McKeon Pavilion

2015–16 West Coast Conference men's basketball standings
	Conf.				Overall
Team	W		L	PCT	W		L	PCT
Saint Mary's	15	–	3	.833	29	–	6	.829
Gonzaga †	15	–	3	.833	28	–	8	.778
BYU	13	–	5	.722	26	–	11	.703
Pepperdine	10	–	8	.556	18	–	14	.563
San Francisco	8	–	10	.444	15	–	15	.500
Santa Clara	7	–	11	.389	11	–	20	.355
Portland	6	–	12	.333	12	–	20	.375
Loyola Marymount	6	–	12	.333	14	–	17	.452
Pacific*	6	–	12	.333	8	–	20	.286
San Diego	4	–	14	.222	9	–	21	.300
† Conference tournament winner *ineligible for postseason due to self probation

The 2015–16 Saint Mary's Gaels men's basketball team represented Saint Mary's College of California during the 2015–16 NCAA Division I men's basketball season. This was head coach Randy Bennett's fifteenth season at Saint Mary's. The Gaels competed in the West Coast Conference and played their home games at the McKeon Pavilion. They finished the season 29–6, 15–3 in WCC play to win a share of the WCC regular season conference championship. They defeated Loyola Marymount and Pepperdine to advance to the championship game of the WCC tournament where they lost to Gonzaga. As a regular season conference champion, and #1 seed in their conference tournament, who failed to win their conference tournament, they received an automatic bid to the National Invitation Tournament. As a #2 seed, they defeated New Mexico State and Georgia to advance to the quarterfinals where they lost to Valparaiso.

== Previous season ==
The Gaels finished the 2014–15 season 21–10, 13–5 in WCC play to finish in a tie for second place. They lost in the quarterfinals of the WCC tournament to Portland. They were invited to the National Invitation Tournament where they lost in the first round to Vanderbilt.

== Departures ==
Name	Number	Pos.	Height	Weight	Year	Hometown	Notes
Brad Waldow	00	F	6'9"	260	RS Senior	Shingle Springs, CA	Graduated
Kerry Carter	3	G	6'2"	205	Senior	West Covina, CA	Graduated / Playing for Iberostar Tenerife (Spain)
Joe Coleman	10	G	6'4"	210	RS Junior	Minneapolis, MN	Left the team for personal reasons
Tyler Harville	12	G	5'11"	170	Freshman	Lexington, KY	Transferred to Berry College
Aaron Bright	20	G	5'11"	175	Senior	Bellevue, WA	Graduated
Garrett Jackson	22	F	6'6"	225	RS Senior	Portland, OR	Graduated
Treaven Duffy	25	G	6'2"	190	RS Sophomore	Walnut Creek, CA	Transferred to San Francisco State
Desmond Simmons	30	F	6'7"	225	RS Senior	Vallejo, CA	Graduated

== Recruiting ==
College recruiting information
Name	Hometown	School	Height	Weight	Commit date
Stefan Gonzalez; PG	Pocatello, ID	Highland High School	6 ft 2 in (1.88 m)	185 lb (84 kg)	Sep 24, 2014
Stefan Gonzalez; PG	Recruit ratings: Scout: Rivals: (60)				
Franklin Porter; SG	Portland, OR	Titon School	6 ft 3 in (1.91 m)	195 lb (88 kg)	Apr 15, 2015
Franklin Porter; SG	Recruit ratings: Scout: Rivals: (NR)				
Overall recruit ranking: Scout: nr Rivals: nr ESPN: nr
Note: In many cases, Scout, Rivals, 247Sports, On3, and ESPN may conflict in their listings of height and weight.; In these cases, the average was taken. ESPN grades are on a 100-point scale.; Sources: "ESPN". ESPN.; "2015 Team Ranking". Rivals.

== Roster ==
2015–16 Saint Mary's Gaels men's basketball team
Players
Coaches

Pos.	#	Name	Height	Weight	Year	Previous school	Hometown
G	00	Tanner Krebs	6 ft 6 in (1.98 m)	200 lb (91 kg)	Fr	Lake Ginninderra College	Hobart, Australia
F	1	Jordan Hunter	6 ft 10 in (2.08 m)	215 lb (98 kg)	Fr	St. Ignatius College	Vaucluse, Australia
G	2	Stefan Gonzalez	6 ft 2 in (1.88 m)	195 lb (88 kg)	Fr	Highland	Pocatello, ID
G	3	Emmett Naar	6 ft 1 in (1.85 m)	195 lb (88 kg)	RS So	Sydney Boys	Sydney, Australia
G	11	Jack Biebel (W)	5 ft 11 in (1.8 m)	185 lb (84 kg)	Jr	Archbishop Mitty; Foothill College	San Jose, CA
C	21	Evan Fitzner	6 ft 10 in (2.08 m)	215 lb (98 kg)	RS Fr	Francis Parker School	San Diego, CA
F	22	Dane Pineau	6 ft 9 in (2.06 m)	225 lb (102 kg)	Jr	Melbourne Grammar	Melbourne, Australia
F	24	Calvin Hermanson	6 ft 6 in (1.98 m)	200 lb (91 kg)	RS So	Lake Oswego	Lake Oswego, OR
G	25	Joe Rahon	6 ft 2 in (1.88 m)	195 lb (88 kg)	RS Jr	Torrey Pines	San Diego, CA
F	33	Kyle Clark	6 ft 6 in (1.98 m)	215 lb (98 kg)	Fr	Hellyer College	Wynyard, Australia
C	34	Jock Landale	6 ft 11 in (2.11 m)	255 lb (116 kg)	So	Geelong Grammar	Malvern East, Victoria, Australia
G	43	Franklin Porter	6 ft 4 in (1.93 m)	210 lb (95 kg)	Fr	Tilton School	Portland, OR

Head coach

- Randy Bennett (UC San Diego)

Assistant coach(es)

- Marty Clarke (Victoria)
- Marcus Schroeder (Princeton)
- David Carter (Saint Mary's)

Legend

- (C) Team captain
- (S) Suspended
- (I) Ineligible
- (W) Walk-on
- Injured
- Current redshirt

Roster

== Schedule and results ==
Date time, TV	Rank^{#}	Opponent^{#}	Result	Record	Site (attendance) city, state
Regular season
11/13/2015*; 8:00 pm, TheW.tv		San Francisco State	W 80–56	1–0	McKeon Pavilion (2,589); Moraga, CA
11/16/2015*; 7:00 pm, TheW.tv		Manhattan	W 89–63	2–0	McKeon Pavilion (2,242); Moraga, CA
11/22/2015*; 8:00 pm, ESPNU		Stanford	W 78–61	3–0	McKeon Pavilion (3,500); Moraga, CA
11/29/2015*; 5:00 pm, CHN		Cal State Bakersfield	W 94–59	4–0	McKeon Pavilion (2,340); Moraga, CA
12/04/2015*; 7:00 pm, TheW.tv		UC Davis	W 81–67	5–0	McKeon Pavilion (2,506); Moraga, CA
12/06/2015*; 5:00 pm, CHN		UC Irvine	W 70–60	6–0	McKeon Pavilion (2,333); Moraga, CA
12/12/2015*; 12:30 pm, P12N		at California	L 59–63	6–1	Haas Pavilion (10,074); Berkeley, CA
12/14/2015*; 7:00 pm, CHN		Cal Poly	W 93–63	7–1	McKeon Pavilion (2,183); Moraga, CA
12/16/2015*; 7:00 pm, TheW.tv		Southern Utah	W 92–36	8–1	McKeon Pavilion (1,836); Moraga, CA
12/21/2015; 8:00 pm, CSNCA		at San Francisco	W 74–52	9–1 (1–0)	McKeon Pavilion (2,408); Moraga, CA
12/23/2015; 8:00 pm, CSNCA		at Santa Clara	W 81–59	10–1 (2–0)	Leavey Center (1,950); Moraga, CA
12/28/2015*; 7:00 pm, TheW.tv		Utah Valley	W 65–50	11–1	McKeon Pavilion (2,113); Moraga, CA
12/31/2015; 8:00 pm, ESPNU		BYU	W 85–74	12–1 (3–0)	McKeon Pavilion (3,183); Moraga, CA
01/02/2016; 7:00 pm, TheW.tv		San Diego	W 79–46	13–1 (4–0)	McKeon Pavilion (2,185); Moraga, CA
01/07/2016; 7:00 pm, TheW.tv		at Loyola Marymount	W 73–48	14–1 (5–0)	Gersten Pavilion (1,791); Los Angeles, CA
01/09/2016; 1:00 pm, CSNCA		at Pepperdine	L 64–67	14–2 (5–1)	Firestone Fieldhouse (1,423); Malibu, CA
01/14/2016; 8:00 pm, ESPNU		Pacific	W 78–62	15–2 (6–1)	McKeon Pavilion (2,983); Moraga, CA
01/21/2016; 8:00 pm, ESPNU		Gonzaga	W 70–67	16–2 (7–1)	McKeon Pavilion (3,500); Moraga, CA
01/23/2016; 8:00 pm, CSNBA		Portland	W 89–74	17–2 (8–1)	McKeon Pavilion (3,338); Moraga, CA
01/30/2016; 8:00 pm, CSNCA		at Pacific	W 68–65	18–2 (9–1)	Alex G. Spanos Center (3,010); Stockton, CA
02/04/2016; 6:00 pm, BYUtv		at BYU	L 59–70	18–3 (9–2)	Marriott Center (14,897); Provo, UT
02/06/2016; 6:00 pm, CSNCA		at San Diego	W 60–43	19–3 (10–2)	Jenny Craig Pavilion (2,292); San Diego, CA
02/11/2016; 8:00 pm, CSNBA		Pepperdine	L 63–69	19–4 (10–3)	McKeon Pavilion (3,340); Moraga, CA
02/13/2016; 8:00 pm, CSNBA		Loyola Marymount	W 68–62	20–4 (11–3)	McKeon Pavilion (3,165); Moraga, CA
02/18/2016; 7:00 pm, TheW.tv		at Portland	W 74–72	21–4 (12–3)	Chiles Center (2,868); Portland, OR
02/20/2016; 7:00 pm, ESPN2		at Gonzaga	W 63–58	22–4 (13–3)	McCarthey Athletic Center (6,000); Spokane, WA
02/25/2016; 8:00 pm, CSNCA		Santa Clara	W 75–50	23–4 (14–3)	McKeon Pavilion (3,165); Moraga, CA
02/27/2016; 8:00 pm, CSNCA		at San Francisco	W 84–72	24–4 (15–3)	War Memorial Gymnasium (2,769); San Francisco, CA
03/01/2016*; 8:00 pm, TheW.tv		Grand Canyon	W 73–64	25–4	McKeon Pavilion (2,735); Moraga, CA
WCC tournament
03/05/2016; 7:00 pm, ESPN2	(1)	vs. (8) Loyola Marymount; Quarterfinals	W 60–48	26–4	Orleans Arena (7,209); Paradise, NV
03/07/2016; 6:00 pm, ESPN	(1)	vs. (4) Pepperdine; Semifinals	W 81–66	27–4	Orleans Arena (8,362); Paradise, NV
03/08/2016; 6:00 pm, ESPN	(1)	vs. (2) Gonzaga; Championship	L 75–85	27–5	Orleans Arena (7,418); Paradise, NV
NIT
03/15/2016*; 7:00 pm, ESPN2	(2)	(7) New Mexico State; First Round – Valparaiso Bracket	W 58–56	28–5	McKeon Pavilion (1,154); Moraga, CA
03/20/2016*; 4:30 pm, ESPNU	(2)	(3) Georgia; Second Round – Valparaiso Bracket	W 77–65	29–5	McKeon Pavilion (2,050); Moraga, CA
03/22/2016*; 4:00 pm, ESPN	(2)	at (1) Valparaiso; Quarterfinals – Valparaiso Bracket	L 44–60	29–6	Athletics–Recreation Center (5,444); Valparaiso, IN
*Non-conference game. ^{#}Rankings from AP Poll. (#) Tournament seedings in parentheses. All times are in Pacific Time.

== Rankings ==
Ranking movement Legend: ██ Increase in ranking. ██ Decrease in ranking. (RV) Received votes but unranked. (NR) Not ranked.
Poll	Pre	Wk 2	Wk 3	Wk 4	Wk 5	Wk 6	Wk 7	Wk 8	Wk 9	Wk 10	Wk 11	Wk 12	Wk 13	Wk 14	Wk 15	Wk 16	Wk 17	Wk 18	Wk 19	Final
AP								RV	RV	RV	RV	RV	RV	RV	NR	RV				*N/A
Coaches								RV	RV	RV	RV	RV	25	RV	RV	RV				

*AP does not release post-NCAA tournament rankings
