= 2015–16 Louisville Cardinals men's basketball team =

American college basketball season

2015–16 Louisville Cardinals men's basketball
- Conference: Atlantic Coast Conference

Ranking
- AP: No. 16
- Record: 23–8 (12–6 ACC)
- Head coach: Rick Pitino (15th season)
- Assistant coaches: Kenny Johnson; Mike Balado; Ralph Willard
- Home arena: KFC Yum! Center

2015–16 ACC men's basketball standings
	Conf.				Overall
Team	W		L	PCT	W		L	PCT
No. 3 North Carolina †	14	–	4	.778	33	–	7	.825
No. 4 Virginia	13	–	5	.722	29	–	8	.784
No. 10 Miami (FL)	13	–	5	.722	27	–	8	.771
No. 16 Louisville*	12	–	6	.667	23	–	8	.742
Notre Dame	11	–	7	.611	24	–	12	.667
No. 19 Duke	11	–	7	.611	25	–	11	.694
Virginia Tech	10	–	8	.556	20	–	15	.571
Clemson	10	–	8	.556	17	–	14	.548
Pittsburgh	9	–	9	.500	21	–	12	.636
Syracuse	9	–	9	.500	23	–	14	.622
Georgia Tech	8	–	10	.444	21	–	15	.583
Florida State	8	–	10	.444	20	–	14	.588
NC State	5	–	13	.278	16	–	17	.485
Wake Forest	2	–	16	.111	11	–	20	.355
Boston College	0	–	18	.000	7	–	25	.219
† 2016 ACC tournament winner * Ineligible for both the 2016 ACC tournament and the 2016 NCAA tournament due to self-imposed postseason ban. Rankings from AP poll

The 2015–16 Louisville Cardinals men's basketball team represented the University of Louisville during the 2015–16 NCAA Division I men's basketball season. This was Louisville's 102nd season of intercollegiate competition. The Cardinals competed in their second season in the Atlantic Coast Conference and were coached by Rick Pitino, in his 15th season at U of L. The team played its home games on Denny Crum Court at the KFC Yum! Center in downtown Louisville. They finished the season 23–8, 12–6 in ACC play to finish in fourth place.

The University of Louisville self-imposed a postseason ban for the 2015–16 season amid an ongoing NCAA investigation over an escort sex scandal involving recruits between 2010 and 2014. None of the players on this team were involved in the allegations. The ban included both the ACC tournament and the NCAA tournament.

== Previous season ==
The Cardinals finished the 2014–15 season with a record of 27–9, 12–6 to finish in fourth place in ACC play. Louisville lost its first ever ACC tournament game to North Carolina, but received an at-large bid to the NCAA tournament. Louisville defeated UC Irvine, Northern Iowa, and NC State to advance to the Elite Eight, where they lost to Michigan State.

== Departures ==
Name	Number	Pos.	Height	Weight	Year	Hometown	Reason for departure
Terry Rozier	0	G	6'1"	190	Sophomore	Cleveland, OH	Declared for 2015 NBA draft
Anton Gill	1	G	6'4"	190	Sophomore	Raleigh, NC	Transferred to Nebraska
Chris Jones	3	G	5'10"	175	Senior	Memphis, TN	Dismissed from the team
Trent Gilbert	15	G	6'0"	180	Freshman	Georgetown, KY	Walk-on; transferred to Gulf Coast State College
Shaqquan Aaron	21	G	6'7"	170	Freshman	Seattle, WA	Transferred to USC
Akoy Agau	22	F	6'8"	230	Sophomore	Omaha, NE	Transferred to Georgetown
Montrezl Harrell	24	F	6'8"	240	Junior	Tarboro, NC	Declared for 2015 NBA draft
Wayne Blackshear	25	G/F	6'5"	215	Senior	Chicago, IL	Graduated

=== Incoming transfers ===
Name	Number	Pos.	Height	Weight	Year	Hometown	Previous school
Damion Lee	0	G/F	6'6"	200	RS senior	Baltimore, MD	Drexel
Trey Lewis	3	G	6'2"	190	RS senior	Garfield Heights, OH	Cleveland State
Jay Henderson	11	G	6'4"	180	RS freshman	Orlando, Florida	St. John's

== Class of 2015 signees ==
College recruiting
Name	Hometown	School	Height	Weight	Commit date
Deng Adel; SF	Melbourne, Australia	Victory Rock Prep	6 ft 7 in (2.01 m)	190 lb (86 kg)	Jul 14, 2014
Deng Adel; SF	Recruit ratings: Scout: Rivals: 247Sports: ESPN:				
Donovan Mitchell; SG	Greenwich, CT	Brewster Academy	6 ft 2 in (1.88 m)	185 lb (84 kg)	Aug 7, 2014
Donovan Mitchell; SG	Recruit ratings: Scout: Rivals: 247Sports: ESPN:				
Ray Spalding; PF	Louisville, KY	Trinity High School	6 ft 9 in (2.06 m)	200 lb (91 kg)	Jul 20, 2014
Ray Spalding; PF	Recruit ratings: Scout: Rivals: 247Sports: ESPN:				
Ryan McMahon; SG	Sarasota, FL	Cardinal Mooney High School	6 ft 1 in (1.85 m)	165 lb (75 kg)	Jul 20, 2014
Ryan McMahon; SG	Recruit ratings: Scout: Rivals: 247Sports: ESPN:				
Overall recruit ranking: Scout: 8 Rivals: 7 ESPN: 8
Note: In many cases, Scout, Rivals, 247Sports, On3, and ESPN may conflict in their listings of height and weight.; In these cases, the average was taken. ESPN grades are on a 100-point scale.; Sources: "Louisville Basketball Commitment List". Rivals.; "2015 Louisville Basketball Commitment List". Scout.; "ESPN". ESPN.; "Scout.com Team Recruiting Rankings". Scout.; "2015 Team Ranking". Rivals.

=== Class of 2016 signees ===
College recruiting (2016)
Name	Hometown	School	Height	Weight	Commit date
V. J. King; SF	Fairfax, VA	Paul VI High School	6 ft 7 in (2.01 m)	179 lb (81 kg)	Jun 12, 2015
V. J. King; SF	Recruit ratings: Scout: Rivals: 247Sports: ESPN:				
Overall recruit ranking: Scout: 8 Rivals: 7 ESPN: 8
Note: In many cases, Scout, Rivals, 247Sports, On3, and ESPN may conflict in their listings of height and weight.; In these cases, the average was taken. ESPN grades are on a 100-point scale.; Sources: "Louisville Basketball Commitment List". Rivals.; "2016 Louisville Basketball Commitment List". Scout.; "ESPN". ESPN.; "Scout.com Team Recruiting Rankings". Scout.; "2016 Team Ranking". Rivals.

== Roster ==
2015–16 Louisville Cardinals men's basketball team
Players
Coaches

Pos.	#	Name	Height	Weight	Year	Previous school	Hometown
G	0	Damion Lee	6 ft 6 in (1.98 m)	210 lb (95 kg)	RS Sr	Calvert Hall / Drexel	Baltimore, Maryland
G	2	Quentin Snider	6 ft 2 in (1.88 m)	175 lb (79 kg)	So	Ballard	Louisville, Kentucky
G	3	Trey Lewis	6 ft 2 in (1.88 m)	185 lb (84 kg)	RS Sr	Garfield Heights / Cleveland State	Garfield Heights, Ohio
G	4	Dillon Avare (W)	6 ft 0 in (1.83 m)	155 lb (70 kg)	RS So	Lexington Catholic	Lexington, Kentucky
F/C	5	Matz Stockman	7 ft 0 in (2.13 m)	250 lb (113 kg)	So	Canarias (BAH)	Oslo, Norway
F	10	Jaylen Johnson	6 ft 9 in (2.06 m)	225 lb (102 kg)	So	Ypsilanti	Ypsilanti, Michigan
G	11	Jay Henderson (W)	6 ft 4 in (1.93 m)	180 lb (82 kg)	RS Fr	Lake Highland Prep	Orlando, Florida
F/C	12	Mangok Mathiang (C)	6 ft 10 in (2.08 m)	220 lb (100 kg)	RS Jr	IMG Academy (FL)	Melbourne, Australia
F	13	Ray Spalding	6 ft 10 in (2.08 m)	210 lb (95 kg)	Fr	Trinity	Louisville, Kentucky
F	14	Anas Mahmoud	7 ft 0 in (2.13 m)	210 lb (95 kg)	So	West Oaks (FL)	Cairo, Egypt
F	22	Deng Adel	6 ft 7 in (2.01 m)	200 lb (91 kg)	Fr	Victory Rock Prep	Melbourne, Australia
F	23	David Levtich (W)	6 ft 3 in (1.91 m)	180 lb (82 kg)	Jr	North Oldham	Goshen, Kentucky
G	30	Ryan McMahon (redshirt)	6 ft 0 in (1.83 m)	165 lb (75 kg)	Fr	Cardinal Mooney	Sarasota, Florida
F/C	32	Chinanu Onuaku	6 ft 10 in (2.08 m)	245 lb (111 kg)	So	Riverdale Baptist	Lanham, Maryland
G	45	Donovan Mitchell	6 ft 3 in (1.91 m)	210 lb (95 kg)	Fr	Brewster Academy	Greenwich, Connecticut

Head coach

- Rick Pitino (UMass)

Assistant coach(es)

- Kenny Johnson (Maryland)
- Mike Balado (St. Thomas)
- Ralph Willard (Holy Cross)

Legend

- (C) Team captain
- (S) Suspended
- (I) Ineligible
- (W) Walk-on
- Injured
- Current redshirt

Roster

== Schedule ==
Date time, TV	Rank^{#}	Opponent^{#}	Result	Record	High points	High rebounds	High assists	Site (attendance) city, state
Exhibition
Nov 1, 2015*; 1:30 pm, WAVE-TV		Bellarmine	W 71–55		14 – Johnson	10 – Tied	8 – Snider	KFC Yum! Center (18,612); Louisville, KY
Nov 9, 2015*; 7:00 pm, WAVE-TV		Kentucky Wesleyan	W 77–68		19 – Lee	8 – Mathiang	4 – Snider	KFC Yum! Center (15,794); Louisville, KY
Non-conference regular season
Nov 13, 2015*; 7:00 pm, ESPN3		Samford	W 86–45	1–0	14 – Tied	7 – Mathiang	6 – Lewis	KFC Yum! Center (20,347); Louisville, KY
Nov 17, 2015*; 7:00 pm, ESPN3		Hartford; Brooklyn Hoops Holiday Invitational	W 87–52	2–0	18 – Tied	9 – Onuaku	6 – Snider	KFC Yum! Center (18,910); Louisville, KY
Nov 21, 2015*; 12:00 pm, ESPN3		North Florida; Brooklyn Hoops Holiday Invitational	W 89–61	3–0	24 – Lee	12 – Spalding	6 – Snider	KFC Yum! Center (20,413); Louisville, KY
Nov 24, 2015*; 7:00 pm, RSN		St. Francis Brooklyn; Brooklyn Hoops Holiday Invitational	W 85–41	4–0	21 – Lee	12 – Onuaku	7 – Lewis	KFC Yum! Center (19,112); Louisville, KY
Nov 28, 2015*; 8:00 pm, ESPN3		vs. Saint Louis; Brooklyn Hoops Holiday Invitational	W 77–57	5–0	22 – Lewis	13 – Mathiang	4 – Snider	Barclays Center; Brooklyn, NY
Dec 2, 2015*; 7:15 pm, ESPN	No. 24	at No. 3 Michigan State; ACC–Big Ten Challenge	L 67–71	5–1	23 – Lee	6 – Tied	5 – Lee	Breslin Center (14,797); East Lansing, MI
Dec 5, 2015*; 12:00 pm, ESPN3	No. 24	Grand Canyon	W 111–63	6–1	24 – Lee	7 – Tied	8 – Snider	KFC Yum! Center (20,380); Louisville, KY
Dec 12, 2015*; 2:00 pm, RSN	No. 22	Eastern Michigan	W 86–53	7–1	16 – Lee	7 – Tied	7 – Mitchell	KFC Yum! Center (20,649); Louisville, KY
Dec 16, 2015*; 7:00 pm, ESPNU	No. 19	Kennesaw State	W 94–57	8–1	18 – Lee	7 – Tied	8 – Snider	KFC Yum! Center (19,288); Louisville, KY
Dec 19, 2015*; 12:00 pm, ESPNU	No. 19	WKU	W 78–56	9–1	16 – Snider	12 – Onuaku	4 – Snider	KFC Yum! Center (21,606); Louisville, KY
Dec 22, 2015*; 9:00 pm, RSN	No. 16	UMKC; Billy Minardi Classic	W 75–47	10–1	17 – Lewis	9 – Tied	3 – Mitchell	KFC Yum! Center (19,419); Louisville, KY
Dec 23, 2015*; 7:00 pm, ESPNU	No. 16	Utah Valley; Billy Minardi Classic	W 98–86	11–1	21 – Lewis	7 – Lewis	4 – Tied	KFC Yum! Center (19,147); Louisville, KY
Dec 26, 2015*; 12:00 pm, CBS	No. 16	at No. 12 Kentucky; Battle for the Bluegrass	L 73–75	11–2	27 – Lee	10 – Onuaku	3 – Mitchell	Rupp Arena (24,412); Lexington, KY
ACC regular season
Jan 3, 2016; 8:00 pm, ESPNU	No. 18	Wake Forest	W 65–57	12–2 (1–0)	18 – Mitchell	15 – Onuaku	2 – Tied	KFC Yum! Center (21,302); Louisville, KY
Jan 7, 2016; 7:00 pm, ESPN2	No. 16	at NC State	W 77–72	13–2 (2–0)	21 – Snider	14 – Onuaku	4 – Mitchell	PNC Arena (17,762); Raleigh, NC
Jan 10, 2016; 12:00 pm, RSN	No. 16	at Clemson	L 62–66	13–3 (2–1)	14 – Onuaku	10 – Tied	3 – Lewis	Bon Secours Wellness Arena (9,562); Greenville, SC
Jan 14, 2016; 9:00 pm, ESPN	No. 21	No. 20 Pittsburgh	W 59–41	14–3 (3–1)	18 – Tied	10 – Onuaku	4 – Lewis	KFC Yum! Center (21,632); Louisville, KY
Jan 20, 2016; 9:00 pm, ESPNU	No. 17	Florida State	W 84–65	15–3 (4–1)	20 – Snider	14 – Onuaku	5 – Lewis	KFC Yum! Center (21,349); Louisville, KY
Jan 23, 2016; 4:00 pm, ESPN2	No. 17	at Georgia Tech	W 75–71	16–3 (5–1)	17 – Lee	11 – Onuaku	4 – Onuaku	Hank McCamish Pavilion (7,829); Atlanta, GA
Jan 27, 2016; 8:00 pm, ACCN/WAVE-TV	No. 16	at Virginia Tech	W 91–83	17–3 (6–1)	29 – Lee	9 – Johnson	6 – Lee	Cassell Coliseum; Blacksburg, VA
Jan 30, 2016; 1:00 pm, CBS	No. 16	No. 11 Virginia	L 47–63	17–4 (6–2)	12 – Tied	7 – Spalding	2 – Tied	KFC Yum! Center (21,714); Louisville, KY
Feb 1, 2016; 7:00 pm, ESPN	No. 19	No. 2 North Carolina; Big Monday	W 71–65	18–4 (7–2)	24 – Lee	10 – Onuaku	7 – Snider	KFC Yum! Center (22,781); Louisville, KY
Feb 6, 2016; 12:00 pm, ACCN/WHAS-TV	No. 19	Boston College	W 79–47	19–4 (8–2)	16 – Lewis	13 – Onuaku	4 – Adel	KFC Yum! Center (21,803); Louisville, KY
Feb 8, 2016; 7:00 pm, ESPN	No. 13	at Duke; Big Monday	L 65–72	19–5 (8–3)	17 – Mitchell	6 – tied	4 – Lee	Cameron Indoor Stadium (9,314); Durham, NC
Feb 13, 2016; 4:00 pm, ESPN2	No. 13	at Notre Dame	L 66–71	19–6 (8–4)	13 – Lee	5 – Spalding	4 – Snider	Edmund P. Joyce Center (9,149); South Bend, IN
Feb 17, 2016; 7:00 pm, ESPN	No. 13	Syracuse	W 72–58	20–6 (9–4)	15 – Lee	15 – Onuaku	6 – Snider	KFC Yum! Center (21,654); Louisville, KY
Feb 20, 2016; 12:00 pm, ESPN	No. 18	No. 20 Duke	W 71–64	21–6 (10–4)	24 – Lee	11 – Onuaku	5 – Lewis	KFC Yum! Center (22,785); Louisville, KY
Feb 24, 2016; 8:00 pm, ACCN/WAVE-TV	No. 11	at Pittsburgh	W 67–60	22–6 (11–4)	14 – Snider	7 – Adel	7 – Snider	Petersen Events Center (10,425); Pittsburgh, PA
Feb 27, 2016; 2:00 pm, ACCN/WHAS-TV	No. 11	at No. 12 Miami (FL)	L 65–73	22–7 (11–5)	14 – Snider	8 – Onuaku	6 – Onuaku	BankUnited Center (7,342); Coral Gables, FL
Mar 1, 2016; 8:00 pm, ACCN/WAVE-TV	No. 11	Georgia Tech	W 56–53	23–7 (12–5)	17 – Onuaku	11 – Onuaku	4 – Snider	KFC Yum! Center (22,043); Louisville, KY
Mar 5, 2016; 8:30 pm, ESPN	No. 11	at No. 4 Virginia	L 46–68	23–8 (12–6)	11 – Mitchell	6 – Mitchell	2 – tied	John Paul Jones Arena (14,088); Charlottesville, VA
*Non-conference game. ^{#}Rankings from AP Poll. (#) Tournament seedings in parentheses. All times are in Eastern Time.

== Rankings ==
Ranking movement Legend: ██ Increase in ranking. ██ Decrease in ranking. ██ Not ranked the previous week. RV=Others receiving votes.
Poll	Pre	Wk 2	Wk 3	Wk 4	Wk 5	Wk 6	Wk 7	Wk 8	Wk 9	Wk 10	Wk 11	Wk 12	Wk 13	Wk 14	Wk 15	Wk 16	Wk 17	Wk 18	Post	Final
AP	RV	RV	RV	24	22	19	16	18	16	21	17	16	19	13	18	11	11	14	16	N/A
Coaches	RV	RV	RV	22	19	16	15	18	16	20	16	14	18	RV	NR*	NR	NR	NR	NR	NR

* Following the announcement of their self-imposed postseason ban, they were no longer eligible for ranking in the coaches poll.
