= 2015–16 Cal State Bakersfield Roadrunners men's basketball team =

American college basketball season

2015–16 Cal State Bakersfield Roadrunners men's basketball
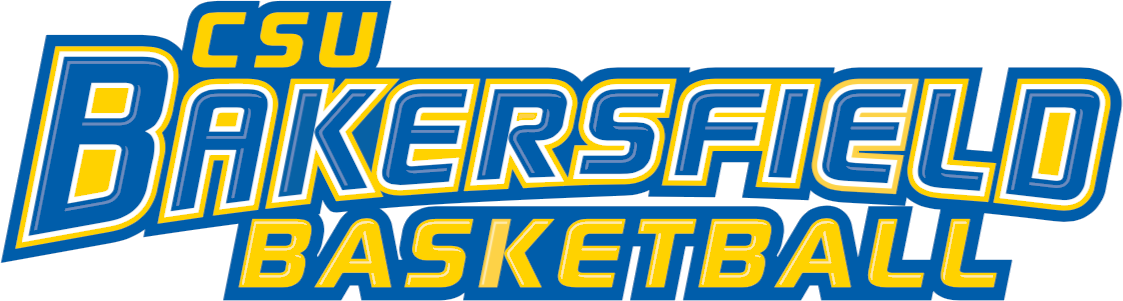

WAC tournament champions

NCAA tournament, First Round
- Conference: Western Athletic Conference
- Record: 24–9 (11–3 WAC)
- Head coach: Rod Barnes (5th season)
- Assistant coaches: Jeff Conarroe; James Alford; Marc Hsu
- Home arena: Icardo Center

2015–16 WAC men's basketball standings
	Conf.				Overall
Team	W		L	PCT	W		L	PCT
New Mexico State	13	–	1	.929	23	–	11	.676
Grand Canyon *	11	–	3	.786	27	–	7	.794
Cal State Bakersfield †	11	–	3	.786	24	–	9	.727
Seattle	7	–	7	.500	15	–	17	.469
Utah Valley	6	–	8	.429	12	–	18	.400
UMKC	4	–	10	.286	12	–	19	.387
Texas–Rio Grande Valley	4	–	10	.286	8	–	22	.267
Chicago State	0	–	14	.000	4	–	28	.125
† 2016 WAC tournament winner * Ineligible for postseason during transition to Division I.

The 2015–16 Cal State Bakersfield Roadrunners men's basketball team represented California State University, Bakersfield during the 2015–16 NCAA Division I men's basketball season. The Roadrunners were led by fifth year head coach Rod Barnes and played their home games at the Icardo Center. The Roadrunners competed as members of the Western Athletic Conference. They finished the season 24–9, 11–3 in WAC play to finish in a tie for second place. They defeated Chicago State, Seattle, and New Mexico State to be champions of the WAC tournament. They earned the conference's automatic bid to the NCAA tournament, their first ever appearance, where they lost in the first round to Oklahoma.

== Previous season ==
The Roadrunners finished the season 14–19, 7–7 in WAC play to finish in a tie for fourth place. They advanced to the semifinals of the WAC tournament where they lost to New Mexico State.

== Departures ==
Name	Number	Pos.	Height	Weight	Year	Hometown	Notes
Tyrell Corbin	2	G	6'0"	185	Senior	Salt Lake City, UT	Graduated
Javonte Maynor	3	G	6'0"	180	RS Senior	Snellville, GA	Graduated
Dashawn Richmond	5	G	6'3"	200	Junior	Staten Island, NY	Transferred to Iona
Kregg Jones	15	F	6'8"	235	RS Senior	Saint George, Barbados	Graduated
Abdul Ahmed	23	C	6'10"	240	RS Senior	London, England	Graduated
Dee Wallace	25	G	5'10"	150	RS Senior	Oxford, MS	Graduated
J. J. Thomas	30	F	6'5"	215	RS Senior	Opelousas, LA	Graduated
Brandon Morris	31	F	6'7"	215	Junior	Lithonia, GA	Left the team for personal reasons

== 2015 incoming recruits ==
College recruiting information
Name	Hometown	School	Height	Weight	Commit date
RaVonn Posey; C	Milwaukee, WI	Sheridan College	6 ft 8 in (2.03 m)	290 lb (130 kg)	Sep 27, 2014
RaVonn Posey; C	Recruit ratings: Scout: Rivals: (JC)				
Dedrick Basile; PG	Houston, TX	Trinity Valley Community College	5 ft 10 in (1.78 m)	160 lb (73 kg)	Oct 4, 2014
Dedrick Basile; PG	Recruit ratings: Scout: Rivals: (JC)				
Justin Pride; PG	Huntsville, AL	Columbia State Community College	5 ft 10 in (1.78 m)	190 lb (86 kg)	Oct 22, 2014
Justin Pride; PG	Recruit ratings: Scout: Rivals: (JC)				
Justin Hollins; PF	Cypress, TX	San Jacinto Community College	6 ft 9 in (2.06 m)	215 lb (98 kg)	Oct 22, 2014
Justin Hollins; PF	Recruit ratings: Scout: Rivals: (JC)				
Bradley Christian; PF	Palm Bay, FL	Paris Junior College	6 ft 7 in (2.01 m)	195 lb (88 kg)	Apr 19, 2015
Bradley Christian; PF	Recruit ratings: Scout: Rivals: (JC)				
Overall recruit ranking:
Note: In many cases, Scout, Rivals, 247Sports, On3, and ESPN may conflict in their listings of height and weight.; In these cases, the average was taken. ESPN grades are on a 100-point scale.; Sources: "2015 Team Ranking". Rivals.

=== 2016 incoming recruits ===
College recruiting information (2016)
Name	Hometown	School	Height	Weight	Commit date
Justin Davis; SF	San Diego, CA	Morse High School	6 ft 4 in (1.93 m)	180 lb (82 kg)	Aug 8, 2015
Justin Davis; SF	Recruit ratings: Scout: Rivals: (68)				
Overall recruit ranking:
Note: In many cases, Scout, Rivals, 247Sports, On3, and ESPN may conflict in their listings of height and weight.; In these cases, the average was taken. ESPN grades are on a 100-point scale.; Sources: "2016 Team Ranking". Rivals.

== Roster ==
2015–16 Cal State Bakersfield Roadrunners men's basketball team
Players
Coaches

Pos.	#	Name	Height	Weight	Year	Previous school	Hometown
F	0	Matt Smith	6 ft 6 in (1.98 m)	190 lb (86 kg)	RS Jr	Columbia State CC; Liberty Tech HS	Jackson, MS
G	1	Brent Wrapp	6 ft 3 in (1.91 m)	175 lb (79 kg)	RS So	Fairview HS	Boulder, CO
G	2	Kyle Ferreira (W)	6 ft 3 in (1.91 m)	190 lb (86 kg)	So	Liberty HS	Bakersfield, CA
G	3	Darryl Geyen	5 ft 10 in (1.78 m)	165 lb (75 kg)	Fr	The Village School	Houston, TX
G	5	Dedrick Basile	5 ft 10 in (1.78 m)	160 lb (73 kg)	Jr	Trinity CC; Madison HS	Houston, TX
F	10	Kevin Mays	6 ft 4 in (1.93 m)	220 lb (100 kg)	Sr	Odessa College; St. John's Military Academy	Queens, NY
F	11	Jaylin Airington	6 ft 4 in (1.93 m)	190 lb (86 kg)	RS Jr	Ventura College; Bowman Leadership Academy	East Chicago, IN
F	12	Ravonn Posey	6 ft 8 in (2.03 m)	280 lb (127 kg)	Jr	Sherdian CC; Riverside HS	Milwaukee, WI
G	23	Damiyne Durham	6 ft 4 in (1.93 m)	175 lb (79 kg)	RS Fr	Oakwood HS	Houston, TX
F	24	Bray Barnes (W)	6 ft 5 in (1.96 m)	185 lb (84 kg)	RS Fr	Liberty HS	Bakersfield, CA
F	33	Justin Hollins	6 ft 8 in (2.03 m)	205 lb (93 kg)	Jr	San Jacinto College; Trent International	Cypress, TX
C	42	Aly Ahmed	6 ft 9 in (2.06 m)	250 lb (113 kg)	Sr	Midland College; Trent International	Alexandria, Egypt
G	51	Justin Pride	5 ft 10 in (1.78 m)	180 lb (82 kg)	Jr	Columbia State CC; Butler HS	Huntsville, AL

Head coach

- Rod Barnes (Mississippi)

Assistant coach(es)

- Jeff Conarroe (Colorado College)
- James Alford (Arizona)
- Marc Hsu (Cabrini College)

Legend

- (C) Team captain
- (S) Suspended
- (I) Ineligible
- (W) Walk-on
- Injured
- Current redshirt

Roster

== Schedule ==
Date time, TV	Rank^{#}	Opponent^{#}	Result	Record	Site (attendance) city, state
Exhibition
11/07/2015*; 7:00 pm		Bristol	W 108–63		Icardo Center (818); Bakersfield, CA
Non-conference regular season
11/14/2015*; 7:00 pm		San Diego Christian	W 93–69	1–0	Icardo Center (901); Bakersfield, CA
11/17/2015*; 7:00 pm		Idaho	W 68–45	2–0	Icardo Center (1,480); Bakersfield, CA
11/20/2015*; 12:00 pm		Fresno Pacific	W 81–68	3–0	Icardo Center (1,946); Bakersfield, CA
11/25/2015*; 6:00 pm		at Wyoming	L 64–68	3–1	Arena-Auditorium (4,387); Laramie, WY
11/29/2015*; 5:00 pm, CHN		at Saint Mary's	L 59–94	3–2	McKeon Pavilion (2,340); Moraga, CA
12/02/2015*; 7:00 pm		at Idaho	L 63–67	3–3	Memorial Gym (563); Moscow, ID
12/05/2015*; 7:00 pm		Northern Arizona	W 72–55	4–3	Icardo Center (1,001); Bakersfield, CA
12/12/2015*; 3:30 pm		at South Dakota	W 77–67	5–3	DakotaDome (2,006); Vermillion, SD
12/14/2015*; 7:00 pm		Dartmouth	W 69–62	6–3	Icardo Center (975); Bakersfield, CA
12/16/2015*; 7:00 pm		at Fresno State	L 68–76	6–4	Save Mart Center (5,105); Fresno, CA
12/19/2015*; 4:00 pm		Menlo	W 82–50	7–4	Icardo Center (976); Bakersfield, CA
12/22/2015*; 7:00 pm		Portland State	W 78–66	8–4	Icardo Center (1,006); Bakersfield, CA
12/28/2015*; 6:00 pm, P12N		at Arizona State	L 59–75	8–5	Wells Fargo Arena (6,625); Tempe, AZ
12/31/2015*; 1:00 pm		Morgan State	W 80–68	9–5	Icardo Center (776); Bakersfield, CA
01/02/2016*; 5:00 pm		at UC Riverside	W 67–48	10–5	UC Riverside Student Recreation Center (321); Riverside, CA
WAC regular season
01/09/2016; 4:05 pm		at UMKC	W 83–72	11–5 (1–0)	Municipal Auditorium (1,786); Kansas City, MO
01/11/2016; 5:05 pm		at Chicago State	W 67–56	12–5 (2–0)	Emil and Patricia Jones Convocation Center (450); Chicago, IL
01/16/2016; 7:30 pm, ASN		at Seattle	W 72–52	13–5 (3–0)	KeyArena (1,622); Seattle, WA
01/21/2016; 6:00 pm, ASN		Texas–Rio Grande Valley	W 77–58	14–5 (4–0)	Icardo Center (1,501); Bakersfield, CA
01/23/2016; 7:00 pm		New Mexico State	L 67–68 ^{2OT}	14–6 (4–1)	Icardo Center (3,880); Bakersfield, CA
01/28/2016; 6:00 pm		at Grand Canyon	L 64–70	14–7 (4–2)	GCU Arena (7,119); Phoenix, AZ
01/30/2016; 6:00 pm		at Utah Valley	W 78–74	15–7 (5–2)	UCCU Center (2,952); Orem, UT
02/04/2016; 7:00 pm		UMKC	W 77–66	16–7 (6–2)	Icardo Center (1,498); Bakersfield, CA
02/06/2016; 7:00 pm		Chicago State	W 71–48	17–7 (7–2)	Icardo Center (1,901); Bakersfield, CA
02/13/2016; 7:00 pm, ASN		Utah Valley	W 91–69	18–7 (8–2)	Icardo Center (1,765); Bakersfield, CA
02/18/2016; 6:00 pm		at New Mexico State	L 55–63	18–8 (8–3)	Pan American Center (4,550); Las Cruces, NM
02/20/2016; 5:00 pm		at Texas–Rio Grande Valley	W 70–57	19–8 (9–3)	UTRGV Fieldhouse (1,299); Edinburg, TX
02/27/2016; 7:00 pm		Grand Canyon	W 77–62	20–8 (10–3)	Icardo Center (3,596); Bakersfield, CA
03/05/2016; 7:00 pm		Seattle	W 93–71	21–8 (11–3)	Icardo Center (1,661); Bakersfield, CA
WAC tournament
03/10/2016; 4:30 pm	(2)	vs. (7) Chicago State; Quarterfinals	W 79–57	22–8	Orleans Arena (1,472); Paradise, NV
03/11/2016; 8:30 pm	(2)	vs. (3) Seattle; Semifinals	W 72–47	23–8	Orleans Arena (1,729); Paradise, NV
03/12/2016; 12:00 pm, ESPNU	(2)	vs. (1) New Mexico State; Championship	W 57–54	24–8	Orleans Arena (1,673); Paradise, NV
NCAA tournament
03/18/2016*; 1:00 pm, TNT	(15 W)	vs. (2 W) No. 7 Oklahoma; First Round	L 68–82	24–9	Chesapeake Energy Arena (15,662); Oklahoma City, OK
*Non-conference game. ^{#}Rankings from AP Poll. (#) Tournament seedings in parentheses. W=West region. All times are in Pacific Time.
