= 2015–16 Seattle Redhawks men's basketball team =

American college basketball season

2015–16 Seattle Redhawks men's basketball

CBI, Quarterfinals
- Conference: Western Athletic Conference
- Record: 15–17 (7–7 WAC)
- Head coach: Cameron Dollar (7th season)
- Assistant coaches: Mike Jones; Lance LaVetter; Darren Talley
- Home arena: KeyArena; Showare Center; Connolly Center

2015–16 WAC men's basketball standings
	Conf.				Overall
Team	W		L	PCT	W		L	PCT
New Mexico State	13	–	1	.929	23	–	11	.676
Grand Canyon *	11	–	3	.786	27	–	7	.794
Cal State Bakersfield †	11	–	3	.786	24	–	9	.727
Seattle	7	–	7	.500	15	–	17	.469
Utah Valley	6	–	8	.429	12	–	18	.400
UMKC	4	–	10	.286	12	–	19	.387
Texas–Rio Grande Valley	4	–	10	.286	8	–	22	.267
Chicago State	0	–	14	.000	4	–	28	.125
† 2016 WAC tournament winner * Ineligible for postseason during transition to Division I.

The 2015–16 Seattle Redhawks men's basketball team represented Seattle University during the 2015–16 NCAA Division I men's basketball season. The Redhawks, led by seventh year head coach Cameron Dollar, played their home games at KeyArena, with two home games at the Showare Center and CBI games at the Connolly Center, and were members of the Western Athletic Conference. They finished the season 15–17, 7–7 in WAC play to finish in fourth place. They defeated Texas–Rio Grande Valley in the quarterfinals of the WAC tournament to advance to the semifinals where they lost to Cal State Bakersfield. They were invited to the College Basketball Invitational where they defeated Idaho in the first round to advance to the quarterfinals where they lost to Vermont.

== Previous season ==
The Redhawks finished the season 18–16, 7–7 in WAC play to finish in a tie for fourth place. They advanced to the championship game of the WAC tournament where they lost to New Mexico State. They were invited to the College Basketball Invitational where they defeated Pepperdine in the first round and Colorado in the quarterfinals before losing in the semifinals to Loyola–Chicago.

== Departures ==
Name	Number	Pos.	Height	Weight	Year	Hometown	Notes
Isiah Umipig	1	G	6'0"	195	RS Senior	Federal Way, WA	Graduated
Emerson Murray	2	G	6'3"	195	RS Senior	Vancouver, BC	Graduated
Theo Turner	10	C	7'0"	245	RS Freshman	Middlesbrough, England	Transferred to Berry
Shore Adenekan	15	F	6'9"	240	Senior	London, England	Graduated
David Trimble	25	G	6'1"	185	Junior	Yakima, WA	Left the team for personal reasons
Luis Bidart	33	G	6'0"	195	RS Junior	São Paulo, Brazil	Left the team for personal reasons
Jarrell Flora	35	G	6'3"	200	RS Senior	Bremerton, WA	Graduated

== 2015 incoming recruits ==
College recruiting information
Name	Hometown	School	Height	Weight	Commit date
Jake Spurgeon; SF	Sherwood, OR	Lakeridge High School	6 ft 5 in (1.96 m)	190 lb (86 kg)	Aug 28, 2014
Jake Spurgeon; SF	Recruit ratings: Scout: Rivals: (NR)				
Malik Montoya; SG	Seattle, WA	Federal Way High School	6 ft 2 in (1.88 m)	180 lb (82 kg)	Aug 31, 2014
Malik Montoya; SG	Recruit ratings: Scout: Rivals: (NR)				
Overall recruit ranking:
Note: In many cases, Scout, Rivals, 247Sports, On3, and ESPN may conflict in their listings of height and weight.; In these cases, the average was taken. ESPN grades are on a 100-point scale.; Sources: "2015 Team Ranking". Rivals.

== Roster ==
2015–16 Seattle Redhawks men's basketball team
Players
Coaches

Pos.	#	Name	Height	Weight	Year	Previous school	Hometown
G	0	Brandan Westendorf	6 ft 5 in (1.96 m)	200 lb (91 kg)	RS Jr	Kentridge HS; Big Bend CC	Auburn, WA
G	2	Malik Montoya	6 ft 5 in (1.96 m)	180 lb (82 kg)	Fr	Federal Way HS	Federal Way, WA
G	5	Matej Kavas	6 ft 7 in (2.01 m)	195 lb (88 kg)	Fr	Gimnazija Bezigrad HS	Ljubljana, Slovenia
F	11	Deshaun Sunderhaus	6 ft 9 in (2.06 m)	215 lb (98 kg)	RS Sr	Rockdale County HS	Conyers, GA
G	12	Jadon Cohee	6 ft 4 in (1.93 m)	182 lb (83 kg)	So	Walnut Grove Secondary	Langley, BC
G	13	Emmanuel Chibuogwu (W)	6 ft 6 in (1.98 m)	185 lb (84 kg)	RS Jr	Shorecrest HS	Shoreline, WA
G	14	Jack Shaughnessy	6 ft 2 in (1.88 m)	180 lb (82 kg)	So	Etowah HS	Woodstock, GA
G	15	Jake Spurgeon	6 ft 5 in (1.96 m)	190 lb (86 kg)	Fr	Lakeridge HS	Lake Oswego, OR
F	21	William Powell	6 ft 6 in (1.98 m)	190 lb (86 kg)	Jr	IMG Acad. Huntsville HS	Huntsville, AL
G	23	Manroop Clair	6 ft 2 in (1.88 m)	180 lb (82 kg)	RS Jr	Hawaii; Huntington Prep	Vancouver, BC
C	24	Jack Crook	6 ft 11 in (2.11 m)	255 lb (116 kg)	Sr	Loreto College	Manchester, England
F	30	Zack Moore	6 ft 4 in (1.93 m)	190 lb (86 kg)	Fr	Bellevue HS	Bellevue, WA
C	41	Aaron Menzies	7 ft 3 in (2.21 m)	260 lb (118 kg)	So	Loreto Academy	Manchester, England

Head coach

- Cameron Dollar (UCLA)

Assistant coach(es)

- Mike Jones (Azusa Pacific)
- Lance LaVetter (Northern Arizona)
- Darren Talley (Chapman)

Legend

- (C) Team captain
- (S) Suspended
- (I) Ineligible
- (W) Walk-on
- Injured
- Current redshirt

Roster

== Schedule ==
Date time, TV	Rank^{#}	Opponent^{#}	Result	Record	Site (attendance) city, state
Non-conference regular season
11/13/2015*; 7:30 pm		Arkansas–Pine Bluff	L 56–58	0–1	KeyArena (3,450); Seattle, WA
11/15/2015*; 2:00 pm		Sacramento State	L 65–77	0–2	KeyArena (1,754); Seattle, WA
11/17/2015*; 6:05 pm		at Eastern Washington	L 70–76	0–3	Reese Court (2,177); Cheney, WA
11/23/2015*; 7:00 pm		Eastern Washington	W 58–52	1–3	KeyArena (3,129); Seattle, WA
11/25/2015*; 6:00 pm		Great Falls	W 58–48	2–3	Showare Center (575); Kent, WA
12/01/2015*; 7:00 pm, P12N		at California	L 52–66	2–4	Haas Pavilion (9,423); Berkeley, CA
12/04/2015*; 7:00 pm		Cal State Fullerton	L 61–70	2–5	KeyArena (1,213); Seattle, WA
12/06/2015*; 6:00 pm		Mississippi Valley State	W 84–72	3–5	KeyArena (1,276); Seattle, WA
12/13/2015*; 5:00 pm		at UAB	L 73–79	3–6	Bartow Arena (3,587); Birmingham, AL
12/17/2015*; 6:00 pm		Northwest Indian	W 98–36	4–6	Showare Center (468); Kent, WA
12/20/2015*; 6:00 pm		San Jose State	W 67–64	5–6	KeyArena (1,275); Seattle, WA
12/22/2015*; 8:00 pm, P12N		at Washington	L 68–79	5–7	Alaska Airlines Arena (6,921); Seattle, WA
12/28/2015*; 7:00 pm		UC Davis	W 80–75	6–7	KeyArena (1,370); Seattle, WA
12/30/2015*; 7:00 pm		UC Santa Barbara	L 50–88	6–8	KeyArena (1,383); Seattle, WA
WAC regular season
01/07/2016; 5:05 pm		at UMKC	L 69–84	6–9 (1–0)	Municipal Auditorium (1,147); Kansas City, MO
01/09/2016; 12:05 pm		at Chicago State	W 66–50	7–9 (1–1)	Emil and Patricia Jones Convocation Center (560); Chicago, IL
01/16/2016; 7:30 pm, ASN		Cal State Bakersfield	L 52–79	7–10 (1–2)	KeyArena (1,622); Seattle, WA
01/21/2016; 7:00 pm		New Mexico State	L 60–68	7–11 (1–3)	KeyArena (1,365); Seattle, WA
01/23/2016; 7:00 pm		Texas–Rio Grande Valley	W 70–59	8–11 (2–3)	KeyArena (1,752); Seattle, WA
01/28/2016; 6:00 pm		at Utah Valley	W 73–62	9–11 (3–3)	UCCU Center (2,629); Orem, UT
01/30/2016; 6:00 pm		at Grand Canyon	W 59–57	10–11 (4–3)	GCU Arena (6,987); Phoenix, AZ
02/04/2016; 7:00 pm, ASN		Chicago State	W 59–56	11–11 (5–3)	KeyArena (1,527); Seattle, WA
02/06/2016; 7:00 pm, ASN		UMKC	W 65–55	12–11 (6–3)	KeyArena (2,260); Seattle, WA
02/12/2016; 7:00 pm		Grand Canyon	L 60–71	12–12 (6–4)	KeyArena (2,546); Seattle, WA
02/18/2016; 5:00 pm		at Texas–Rio Grande Valley	L 57–67	12–13 (6–5)	UTRGV Fieldhouse (1,435); Edinburg, TX
02/20/2016; 6:00 pm		at New Mexico State	L 57–70	12–14 (6–6)	Pan American Center (4,669); Las Cruces, NM
02/27/2016; 7:00 pm		Utah Valley	W 72–69	13–14 (7–6)	KeyArena (2,767); Seattle, WA
03/05/2016; 7:00 pm		at Cal State Bakersfield	L 71–93	13–15 (7–7)	Icardo Center (1,661); Bakersfield, CA
WAC tournament
03/10/2016; 7:00 pm	(3)	vs. (6) Texas–Rio Grande Valley; Quarterfinals	W 75–52	14–15	Orleans Arena (1,472); Paradise, NV
03/11/2016; 8:30 pm	(3)	vs. (2) Cal State Bakersfield; Semifinals	L 47–72	14–16	Orleans Arena (1,729); Paradise, NV
CBI
03/16/2016*; 7:00 pm		Idaho; First round	W 68–63	15–16	Connolly Center (999); Seattle, WA
03/21/2016*; 7:00 pm		Vermont; Quarterfinals	L 54–73	15–17	Connolly Center (999); Seattle, WA
*Non-conference game. ^{#}Rankings from AP Poll. (#) Tournament seedings in parentheses. All times are in Pacific Time.
