= 2016 WAC men's basketball tournament =

2016 Western Athletic Conference men's basketball tournament
- Classification: Division I
- Season: 2015–16
- Teams: 7
- Site: Orleans Arena; Paradise, Nevada
- Champions: Cal State Bakersfield (1st title)
- Winning coach: Rod Barnes (1st title)
- MVP: Dedrick Basile (Cal State Bakersfield)
- Television: ESPNU

2015–16 WAC men's basketball standings
	Conf.				Overall
Team	W		L	PCT	W		L	PCT
New Mexico State	13	–	1	.929	23	–	11	.676
Grand Canyon *	11	–	3	.786	27	–	7	.794
Cal State Bakersfield †	11	–	3	.786	24	–	9	.727
Seattle	7	–	7	.500	15	–	17	.469
Utah Valley	6	–	8	.429	12	–	18	.400
UMKC	4	–	10	.286	12	–	19	.387
Texas–Rio Grande Valley	4	–	10	.286	8	–	22	.267
Chicago State	0	–	14	.000	4	–	28	.125
† 2016 WAC tournament winner * Ineligible for postseason during transition to Division I.

The 2016 WAC men's basketball tournament was a postseason men's basketball tournament for the Western Athletic Conference, held from March 10–12, 2016 at Orleans Arena in Paradise, Nevada. The winner of the tournament received the conference's automatic bid into the 2016 NCAA tournament.

== Seeds ==
Grand Canyon was ineligible to participate in the conference tournament during its transition to Division I. The remaining seven teams participated in the tournament. The top seed received a bye to the semifinals.

Teams were seeded by record within the conference, with a tiebreaker system to seed teams with identical conference records.

Seed	School	Conference	Tiebreaker
1	New Mexico State	13–1	
2	Cal State Bakersfield	11–3	
3	Seattle	7–7	
4	Utah Valley	6–8	
5	UMKC	4–10	Higher RPI than UT Rio Grande Valley
6	UT Rio Grande Valley	4–10	Lower RPI than UMKC
7	Chicago State	0–14	

== Schedule ==
Session	Game	Time*	Matchup^{#}
Quarterfinals – Thursday, March 10
1	1	2:00 pm	#4 Utah Valley 78 vs. #5 UMKC 80
1	2	4:30 pm	#2 Cal State Bakersfield 79 vs. #7 Chicago State 57
1	3	7:00 pm	#3 Seattle 75 vs. #6 UT Rio Grande Valley 52
Semifinals – Friday, March 11
2	4	6:00 pm	#1 New Mexico State 78 vs. #5 UMKC 64
2	5	8:30 pm	#2 Cal State Bakersfield 72 vs. #3 Seattle 47
Championship – Saturday, March 12
3	6	8:30 pm	#1 New Mexico State 54 vs. #2 Cal State Bakersfield 57
*Game times in PT. #-Rankings denote tournament seeding.

== Bracket ==
Quarterfinals; Thursday, March 10
4	Utah Valley	78
5	UMKC	80
2	Cal State Bakersfield	79
7	Chicago State	57
3	Seattle	75
6	UT Rio Grande Valley	52

Semifinals; Friday, March 11
1	New Mexico State	78
5	UMKC	64
2	Cal State Bakersfield	72
3	Seattle	47

Championship; Saturday, March 12; ESPNU
1	New Mexico State	54
2	Cal State Bakersfield	57
