= 2015–16 Grand Canyon Antelopes men's basketball team =

American college basketball season

2015–16 Grand Canyon Antelopes men's basketball

Global Basketball Classic champions Coach John McLendon Classic champions

CIT, Quarterfinals
- Conference: Western Athletic Conference
- Record: 27–7 (11–3 WAC)
- Head coach: Dan Majerle (3rd season)
- Assistant coaches: Todd Lee; Chris Crevelone; T. J. Benson
- Home arena: GCU Arena

2015–16 WAC men's basketball standings
	Conf.				Overall
Team	W		L	PCT	W		L	PCT
New Mexico State	13	–	1	.929	23	–	11	.676
Grand Canyon *	11	–	3	.786	27	–	7	.794
Cal State Bakersfield †	11	–	3	.786	24	–	9	.727
Seattle	7	–	7	.500	15	–	17	.469
Utah Valley	6	–	8	.429	12	–	18	.400
UMKC	4	–	10	.286	12	–	19	.387
Texas–Rio Grande Valley	4	–	10	.286	8	–	22	.267
Chicago State	0	–	14	.000	4	–	28	.125
† 2016 WAC tournament winner * Ineligible for postseason during transition to Division I.

The 2015–16 Grand Canyon Antelopes men's basketball team represented Grand Canyon University during the 2015–16 NCAA Division I men's basketball season. This was head coach Dan Majerle's third season at Grand Canyon. This season was year 3 of a 4-year transition period from Division II to Division I. As a result, the Antelopes were not eligible to make the NCAA Tournament, nor the NIT and could not participate WAC Basketball Tournament. However the Antelopes were eligible for the CIT, CBI or the new Vegas 16 tournaments if invited. They finished the season 27–7, 11–3 in WAC play to finish in a tie for second place. They were invited to the CollegeInsider.com Tournament. In the first round, they defeated South Carolina State to be champions of the Coach John McLendon Classic, the first classic game to be held as part of a postseason tournament. In the second round they defeated Jackson State to advance to the quarterfinals where they lost to Coastal Carolina.

== Previous season ==
The Antelopes finished the season 17–15, 8–6 in WAC play to finish in a tie for second place. They were invited to the CollegeInsider.com Tournament where they lost in the first round to Northern Arizona.

== Departures ==
Name	Number	Pos.	Height	Weight	Year	Hometown	Notes
Isaiah Juarez	1	G	6'3"	180	Freshman	Tustin, CA	Transferred to Holy Names
Sam Daly	3	G	6'3"	175	Sophomore	Adelaide, Australia	Transferred to Chaminade
Daniel Alexander	12	F	6'9"	217	RS Senior	Austin, TX	Graduated
Jerome Garrison	21	G	6'3"	178	Senior	Phoenix, AZ	Graduated
Royce Woolrige	22	G	6'3"	180	Senior	Phoenix, AZ	Graduated
Miroslav Jakšić	25	F	6'11"	220	RS Freshman	Windsor, ON	Transferred to Toronto
Tobe Okafor	50	C	6'11"	230	Junior	Lagos, Nigeria	Transferred to Arkansas Tech

=== Incoming transfers ===
Name	Number	Pos.	Height	Weight	Year	Hometown	Previous School
Grandy Glaze	1	F	6'6"	235	RS Senior	Toronto, ON	Transferred from Saint Louis. Will be eligible to play immediately since Glaze graduated from Saint Louis.
Grand White	3	G	6'2"	175	RS Senior	Monroeville, AL	Transferred from Jacksonville State. Will be eligible to play immediately since White graduated from Jacksonville State.
Uros Ljeskovic	13	F	6'8"	240	Senior	Nikšić, Montenegro	Transferred from Coastal Carolina. Will be eligible to play immediately since Ljeskovic graduated from Coastal Carolina.
Keonta Vernon	24	F	6'6"	225	Junior	Tulare, CA	Transferred junior college from College of Southern Idaho.

== 2015 incoming recruits ==
College recruiting information
Name	Hometown	School	Height	Weight	Commit date
Kenzo Nudo #124 SG	Scottsdale, AZ	Chaparral High School	6 ft 3 in (1.91 m)	185 lb (84 kg)	May 21, 2014
Kenzo Nudo #124 SG	Recruit ratings: Scout: Rivals: (59)				
Overall recruit ranking:
Note: In many cases, Scout, Rivals, 247Sports, On3, and ESPN may conflict in their listings of height and weight.; In these cases, the average was taken. ESPN grades are on a 100-point scale.; Sources: "2015 Team Ranking". Rivals.

== Roster ==
2015–16 Grand Canyon Antelopes men's basketball team
Players
Coaches

Pos.	#	Name	Height	Weight	Year	Previous school	Hometown
G	0	DeWayne Russell	5 ft 11 in (1.8 m)	155 lb (70 kg)	RS Sr	Peoria; Northern Arizona	Peoria, AZ
F	1	Grandy Glaze	6 ft 6 in (1.98 m)	235 lb (107 kg)	RS Sr	Notre Dame Prep; Saint Louis	Toronto, ON
G	2	Joshua Braun	6 ft 4 in (1.93 m)	195 lb (88 kg)	RS So	Westwind Prep Academy	Anthem, AZ
G	3	Grant White	6 ft 1 in (1.85 m)	175 lb (79 kg)	Sr	Monroeville; Jacksonville State	Monroeville, AL
G	4	Ryan Majerle (W)	6 ft 3 in (1.91 m)	190 lb (86 kg)	RS Sr	Rockford; Grand Valley State/Toledo	Rockford, MI
F	5	Matt Jackson	6 ft 8 in (2.03 m)	210 lb (95 kg)	So	Diamond Valley	Diamond Creek, Australia
G	10	Dominic Magee	6 ft 4 in (1.93 m)	180 lb (82 kg)	RS Fr	Helen Cox; Memphis	Harvey, LA
G	11	De'Andre Davis	6 ft 1 in (1.85 m)	180 lb (82 kg)	So	Cedar Ridge	Round Rock, TX
C	12	Boubacar Toure	6 ft 11 in (2.11 m)	215 lb (98 kg)	RS Fr	Phase One Academy	Dekar, Senegal
F	13	Uros Ljeskovic	6 ft 8 in (2.03 m)	240 lb (109 kg)	Sr	Nelson; Coastal Carolina	Nikšić, Montenegro
F	21	Kerwin Smith	6 ft 9 in (2.06 m)	200 lb (91 kg)	So	Woodrow Wilson	Dallas, TX
G	22	Adrian Carrion Armas (W)	5 ft 11 in (1.8 m)	168 lb (76 kg)	So	Canarias Basketball Academy	Seville, Spain
F	23	Jevon Estelle	6 ft 3 in (1.91 m)	210 lb (95 kg)	Sr	Winslow	Winslow, AZ
F	24	Keonta Vernon	6 ft 6 in (1.98 m)	225 lb (102 kg)	Jr	Tulare Union; College of Southern Idaho	Tulare, CA
F	25	Zach Tolson	6 ft 7 in (2.01 m)	200 lb (91 kg)	RS So	Chaparral; Northern State	Scottsdale, AZ
G	35	Kenzo Nudo	6 ft 4 in (1.93 m)	200 lb (91 kg)	Fr	Chaparral	Scottsdale, AZ
G	42	Gerard Martin	6 ft 6 in (1.98 m)	195 lb (88 kg)	RS Fr	Australian Institute of Sport	Manly, Australia

Head coach

- Dan Majerle (Central Michigan)

Assistant coach(es)

- Todd Lee (Azusa Pacific)
- Chris Crevelone (Adams State)
- T. J. Benson (Grand Canyon)

Legend

- (C) Team captain
- (S) Suspended
- (I) Ineligible
- (W) Walk-on
- Injured
- Current redshirt

Roster

== Schedule and results ==
Date time, TV	Opponent	Result	Record	Site (attendance) city, state
Exhibition
November 5*; 7:00 pm, Cox7	New Mexico Highlands	W 84–53		GCU Arena (6,625); Phoenix, AZ
Regular season
November 13*; 7:00 pm, Cox7	Portland State	W 82–72	1–0	GCU Arena (7,249); Phoenix, AZ
November 17*; 7:00 pm, Cox7	Black Hills State	W 88–72	2–0	GCU Arena (5,102); Phoenix, AZ
November 19*; 7:00 pm, Cox7	Alcorn State	W 79–46	3–0	GCU Arena (4,720); Phoenix, AZ
November 23*; 7:00 pm, Cox7	Mississippi Valley State	W 94–60	4–0	GCU Arena (4,613); Phoenix, AZ
November 30*; 7:00 pm, Cox7	Hampton	W 63–51	5–0	GCU Arena (4,723); Phoenix, AZ
December 3*; 7:00 pm, Cox7	Central Michigan	W 75–72	6–0	GCU Arena (5,642); Phoenix, AZ
December 5*; 10:00 am, ESPN3	at No. 24 Louisville	L 63–111	6–1	KFC Yum! Center (20,380); Louisville, KY
December 8*; 7:00 pm, Cox7	Southern; Global Basketball Classic	W 70–56	7–1	GCU Arena (5,637); Phoenix, AZ
December 13*; 6:00 pm, Cox7	Omaha; Global Basketball Classic	L 104–108 ^{OT}	7–2	GCU Arena (4,614); Phoenix, AZ
December 15*; 7:00 pm, Cox7	Delaware State	W 88–59	8–2	GCU Arena (5,223); Phoenix, AZ
December 18*; 8:00 pm	at San Diego State	W 52–45	9–2	Viejas Arena (12,414); San Diego, CA
December 21*; 6:00 pm	vs. Houston; Global Basketball Classic semifinals	W 78–69	10–2	Cox Pavilion (868); Paradise, NV
December 22*; 8:30 pm	vs. Marshall; Global Basketball Classic championship	W 85–81	11–2	Cox Pavilion (227); Paradise, NV
December 28*; 6:00 pm	at SIU Edwardsville	W 86–75	12–2	Vadalabene Center (1,402); Edwardsville, IL
January 3*; 6:00 pm, Cox7	Bethune-Cookman	W 74–53	13–2	GCU Arena (4,719); Phoenix, AZ
January 7; 7:00 pm, Cox7	Texas–Rio Grande Valley	W 83–63	14–2 (1–0)	GCU Arena (5,452); Phoenix, AZ
January 9; 7:00 pm, KTVK	New Mexico State	W 79–75	15–2 (2–0)	GCU Arena (7,413); Phoenix, AZ
January 16; 7:00 pm, KTVK	Utah Valley	W 99–88	16–2 (3–0)	GCU Arena (4,672); Phoenix, AZ
January 21; 6:00 pm, WAC DN	at Chicago State	W 90–65	17–2 (4–0)	JCC (1,783); Chicago, IL
January 23; 6:00 pm, ASN	at UMKC	W 85–78	18–2 (5–0)	Municipal Auditorium (2,186); Kansas City, MO
January 28; 7:00 pm, Cox7	Cal State Bakersfield	W 70–64	19–2 (6–0)	GCU Arena (7,119); Phoenix, AZ
January 30; 7:00 pm, KTVK	Seattle	L 57–59	19–3 (6–1)	GCU Arena (6,987); Phoenix, AZ
February 4; 7:00 pm, WAC DN	at New Mexico State	L 50–70	19–4 (6–2)	Pan American Center (5,509); Las Cruces, NM
February 6; 6:00 pm, WAC DN	at Texas–Rio Grande Valley	W 64–58	20–4 (7–2)	UTRGV Fieldhouse (1,128); Edinburg, TX
February 9*; 7:00 pm, Cox7	Benedictine (AZ)	W 95–71	21–4	GCU Arena (4,632); Phoenix, AZ
February 12; 8:00 pm, WAC DN	at Seattle	W 71–60	22–4 (8–2)	KeyArena (2,546); Seattle, WA
February 18; 7:00 pm, Cox7	UMKC	W 78–66	23–4 (9–2)	GCU Arena (6,049); Phoenix, AZ
February 20; 7:00 pm, KTVK	Chicago State	W 67–52	24–4 (10–2)	GCU Arena (7,223); Phoenix, AZ
February 27; 8:00 pm, WAC DN	at Cal State Bakersfield	L 62–77	24–5 (10–3)	Icardo Center (3,596); Bakersfield, CA
March 1*; 8:00 pm, TheW.tv	at Saint Mary's	L 64–73	24–6	McKeon Pavilion (2,735); Moraga, CA
March 5; 2:00 pm, ASN	at Utah Valley	W 86–79	25–6 (11–3)	UCCU Center (3,854); Orem, UT
CIT
March 14*; 7:00 pm, CBSSN	South Carolina State; First round Coach John McLendon Classic	W 78–74	26–6	GCU Arena (7,315); Phoenix, AZ
March 17*; 7:00 pm, Cox7	Jackson State; Second round	W 64–54	27–6	GCU Arena (7,015); Phoenix, AZ
March 23*; 4:00 pm	at Coastal Carolina; Quarterfinals	L 58–60	27–7	HTC Center (1,302); Conway, SC
*Non-conference game. ^{#}Rankings from AP Poll. (#) Tournament seedings in parentheses. All times are in Mountain Time.
