= 2015–16 Texas–Rio Grande Valley Vaqueros men's basketball team =

American college basketball season

2015–16 Texas–Rio Grande Valley Vaqueros men's basketball
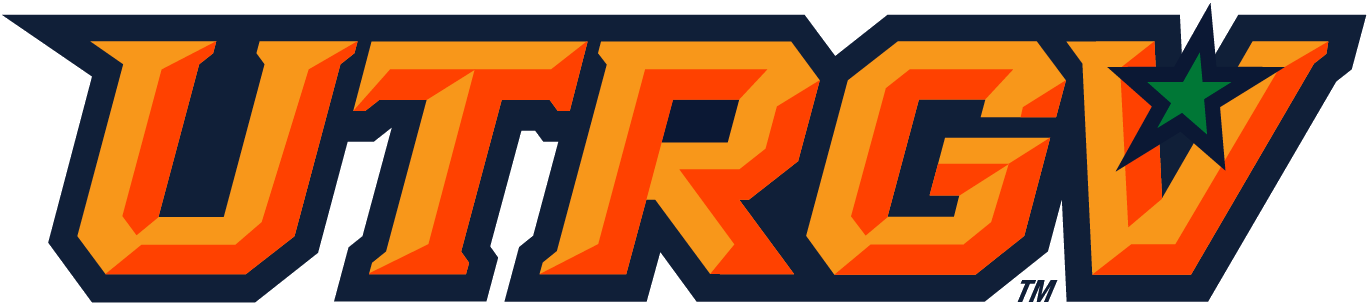
- Conference: Western Athletic Conference
- Record: 8–22 (4–10 WAC)
- Head coach: Dan Hipsher (3rd season)
- Assistant coaches: Andy Hipsher; Jai Steadman; Willie Watson
- Home arena: UTRGV Fieldhouse

2015–16 WAC men's basketball standings
	Conf.				Overall
Team	W		L	PCT	W		L	PCT
New Mexico State	13	–	1	.929	23	–	11	.676
Grand Canyon *	11	–	3	.786	27	–	7	.794
Cal State Bakersfield †	11	–	3	.786	24	–	9	.727
Seattle	7	–	7	.500	15	–	17	.469
Utah Valley	6	–	8	.429	12	–	18	.400
UMKC	4	–	10	.286	12	–	19	.387
Texas–Rio Grande Valley	4	–	10	.286	8	–	22	.267
Chicago State	0	–	14	.000	4	–	28	.125
† 2016 WAC tournament winner * Ineligible for postseason during transition to Division I.

The 2015–16 Texas–Rio Grande Valley Vaqueros men's basketball team represented the University of Texas Rio Grande Valley during the 2015–16 NCAA Division I men's basketball season. This was head coach Dan Hipsher's third season with the UTRGV program, although his first under the "UTRGV" name. The Vaqueros played their home games at the UTRGV Fieldhouse on the university's campus in Edinburg, Texas and were members of the Western Athletic Conference. They finished the season 8–22 and 4–10 in WAC play to finish in a tie for sixth place. They lost in the quarterfinals of the WAC tournament to Seattle.

This was the first season as an institution for UTRGV, formed in a consolidation between the University of Texas-Pan American (UTPA) and the University of Texas at Brownsville. The former UTPA athletic program was converted to that of UTRGV, with UTPA's conference membership and athletic history transferring directly to the new institution.

On March 15, 2016, the school removed Dan Hipsher as head coach. On March 31, the school hired Lew Hill as head coach.

== Previous season ==
The Texas-Pan American Broncs finished the 2014–15 season 10–21, 4–10 in WAC play to finish in a tie for seventh place. They lost in the quarterfinals of the WAC tournament to UMKC.

== Departures ==
Name	Number	Pos.	Height	Weight	Year	Hometown	Notes
Elijah Watson	1	G	6'2"	185	RS Freshman	Chicago, IL	Transferred to Kaskaskia College
Isaiah Hobbs	3	G	6'4"	178	Freshman	Boynton Beach, FL	Transferred to Howard College
Shaquile Boga	5	G	5'11"	170	Senior	St. Louis, MO	Graduated
Moe McDonald	10	G	6'4"	185	RS Freshman	McAllen, TX	Transferred to Highland Community College
Andreas Bigum	11	F	6'9"	218	Junior	Copenhagen, Denmark	Transferred to Fresno Pacific
Janari Jõesaar	21	F	6'6"	208	Sophomore	Tartu, Estonia	Signed to play professionally by Rapla
Shaun Noriega	22	G	6'4"	207	RS Senior	Sarasota, FL	Graduated
Josh Butler	33	F	6'6"	225	Sophomore	Los Angeles, CA	Walk-on; left the team for personal reasons

=== Incoming transfers ===
Name	Number	Pos.	Height	Weight	Year	Hometown	Previous School
J. J. Thompson	3	G	6'0"	185	RS Senior	Irving, TX	Transferred from Southeast Missouri State. Will be eligible to play immediately since Thompson graduated from Southeast Missouri State.
Nick Dixon	5	G	6'2"	180	RS Junior	Bellwood, IL	Junior college transferred from Morton College
Lew Stallworth	13	G	6'1"	175	Sophomore	Santa Clarita, CA	Transferred from UTEP. Under NCAA transfer rules, Stallworth will have to sit out for the 2015–16 season. Will have three years of remaining eligibility.
Michael Hoffman	21	F	6'8"	192	Junior	Burleson, TX	Transferred from Lafayette. Under NCAA transfer rules, Hoffman will have to sit out for the 2015–16 season. Will have two years of remaining eligibility.
Dino Mercurius	30	G	6'4"	165	Sophomore	Bronx, NY	Transferred from South Florida. Under NCAA transfer rules, Mercurius will have to sit out for the 2015–16 season. Will have three years of remaining eligibility.
Ot Elmore	33	G	6'3"	190	RS Sophomore	Charleston, SC	Transferred from VMI. Under NCAA transfer rules, Mercurius will have to sit out for the 2015–16 season. Will have three years of remaining eligibility.
Dakota Slaughter	35	F	6'6"	220	RS Senior	Fishers, IN	Transferred from Alabama. Slaughter will be eligible to play immediately since Slaughter graduated from Alabama.

== 2015 incoming recruits ==
College recruiting information
Name	Hometown	School	Height	Weight	Commit date
William Brooks; C	Torrance, CA	Westwind Prep Academy	7 ft 0 in (2.13 m)	210 lb (95 kg)	Oct 23, 2014
William Brooks; C	Recruit ratings: Scout: Rivals: (NR)				
Walter Jones; SG	Newborn, AL	Sunshine High School	6 ft 5 in (1.96 m)	N/A	Oct 25, 2014
Walter Jones; SG	Recruit ratings: Scout: Rivals: (NR)				
Antonio Green; SG	Tupelo, MS	Tupelo High School	6 ft 1 in (1.85 m)	170 lb (77 kg)	
Antonio Green; SG	Recruit ratings: Scout: Rivals: (NR)				
Overall recruit ranking:
Note: In many cases, Scout, Rivals, 247Sports, On3, and ESPN may conflict in their listings of height and weight.; In these cases, the average was taken. ESPN grades are on a 100-point scale.; Sources: "2015 Team Ranking". Rivals.

== Roster ==
2015–16 UTRGV Vaqueros men's basketball team
Players
Coaches

Pos.	#	Name	Height	Weight	Year	Previous school	Hometown
G	0	Everett Osborne	6 ft 4 in (1.93 m)	190 lb (86 kg)	RS Sr	Palisades; Los Angeles Trade Tech	Los Angeles, CA
G	2	Mike Lopez	6 ft 1 in (1.85 m)	185 lb (84 kg)	So	Wylie	Abilene, TX
G	3	J. J. Thompson	6 ft 0 in (1.83 m)	190 lb (86 kg)	RS Sr	Irving; Southeast Missouri State	Irving, TX
G	5	Nick Dixon	6 ft 2 in (1.88 m)	175 lb (79 kg)	Jr	Proviso West; Morton College	Hillside, IL
G	13	Lew Stallworth (I) (redshirt)	6 ft 1 in (1.85 m)	187 lb (85 kg)	So	William S. Hart; UTEP	Santa Clarita, CA
G	20	Walter Jones	6 ft 4 in (1.93 m)	200 lb (91 kg)	Fr	Sunshine	Newbern, AL
F	21	Mike Hoffman (I) (redshirt)	6 ft 9 in (2.06 m)	215 lb (98 kg)	Jr	Nolan Catholic; Lafayette	Burleson, TX
F	23	Dan Kimasa	6 ft 10 in (2.08 m)	230 lb (104 kg)	So	Tampa Bay Christian Academy	Kigali City, Rwanda
F	24	Shaquille Hines	6 ft 7 in (2.01 m)	215 lb (98 kg)	Sr	Harlan; Trent Prep High	Chicago, IL
G	30	Joaquin Pistokache (W)	6 ft 2 in (1.88 m)	175 lb (79 kg)	RS Jr	Sharyland; Roberts Wesleyan	Mission, TX
F	32	Adonis Rwabigwi	6 ft 8 in (2.03 m)	220 lb (100 kg)	RS So	Tampa Prep; Furman	Kigali City, Rwanda
G	33	Ot Elmore (I, W) (redshirt)	6 ft 2 in (1.88 m)	175 lb (79 kg)	RS So	Fort Union Military; VMI	Charleston, WV
F	35	Dakota Slaughter	6 ft 7 in (2.01 m)	222 lb (101 kg)	RS Sr	Fishers; Alabama	Fisher, IN
F	44	Christopher Ikuenobe	6 ft 9 in (2.06 m)	240 lb (109 kg)	RS Jr	Nigerian Air Force Secondary School; Independence CC	Warri, Nigeria
G	55	Antonio Green	6 ft 2 in (1.88 m)	165 lb (75 kg)	Fr	Tupelo	Tupelo, MS

Head coach

- Dan Hipsher (Bowling Green)

Assistant coach(es)

- Andy Hipsher (Akron)
- Jai Steadman (Nebraska)
- Willie Watson (Alabama)

Legend

- (C) Team captain
- (S) Suspended
- (I) Ineligible
- (W) Walk-on
- Injured
- Current redshirt

Roster

== Schedule and results ==
For the first time in club history, every home game will be televised. UTRGV has entered into a deal with TWCS Texas to broadcast all 13 home games. Every home game, unless it becomes a WAC DN exclusive, will air on the network.

Date time, TV	Opponent	Result	Record	Site (attendance) city, state
Exhibition
11/07/2015*; 7:00 pm	Texas A&M International	W 67–58		UTRGV Fieldhouse; Edinburg, TX
Non-conference regular season
11/13/2015*; 6:00 pm, ESPN3	at Miami (FL)	L 59–86	0–1	BankUnited Center (6,607); Coral Gables, FL
11/16/2015*; 6:00 pm, ESPN3	at North Florida	L 84–106	0–2	UNF Arena (2,718); Jacksonville, FL
11/20/2015*; 7:00 pm, TWCS	Texas A&M–Kingsville	W 78–56	1–2	UTRGV Fieldhouse (1,371); Edinburg, TX
11/22/2015*; 2:00 pm, TWCS	Portland State	L 61–79	1–3	UTRGV Fieldhouse (523); Edinburg, TX
11/24/2015*; 7:00 pm, TWCS	Southeast Missouri State	W 83–74	2–3	UTRGV Fieldhouse (1,003); Edinburg, TX
11/30/2015*; 7:00 pm, ESPN3	at Houston	L 65–78	2–4	Hofheinz Pavilion (1,974); Houston, TX
12/02/2015*; 7:00 pm, TWCS Alt.	at Lamar	L 60–83	2–5	Montagne Center (1,766); Beaumont, TX
12/06/2015*; 2:00 pm, TWCS	Angelo State	W 76–75	3–5	UTRGV Fieldhouse (821); Edinburg, TX
12/11/2015*; 7:00 pm, TWCS	Tennessee–Martin	L 64–72	3–6	UTRGV Fieldhouse (1,169); Edinburg, TX
12/13/2015*; 2:00 pm	at Texas State	L 59–68	3–7	Strahan Coliseum (1,389); San Marcos, TX
12/21/2015*; 9:00 pm	at Utah State; World Vision Classic	L 69–94	3–10	Smith Spectrum (8,156); Logan, UT
12/22/2015*; 6:30 pm	vs. North Dakota State; World Vision Classic	L 50–68	3–9	Smith Spectrum (7,746); Logan, UT
12/23/2015*; 6:30 pm	vs. Idaho State; World Vision Classic	L 64–76	3–10	Smith Spectrum (8,321); Logan, UT
12/29/2015*; 8:00 pm	at UTEP	L 64–85	3–11	Don Haskins Center (6,819); El Paso, TX
01/02/2016*; 7:00 pm, TWCS	Our Lady of the Lake	W 89–81	4–11	UTRGV Fieldhouse (1,047); Edinburg, TX
WAC Conference Play
01/07/2016; 8:00 pm, TWCS	at Grand Canyon	L 63–83	4–12 (0–1)	GCU Arena (5,452); Phoenix, AZ
01/09/2016; 8:00 pm, YouTube	at Utah Valley	L 65–98	4–13 (0–2)	UCCU Center (1,881); Orem, UT
01/14/2016; 7:00 pm, WAC DN	Chicago State	W 82–72	5–13 (1–2)	UTRGV Fieldhouse (1,211); Edinburg, TX
01/16/2016; 7:00 pm, TWCS	UMKC	W 71–66	6–13 (2–2)	UTRGV Fieldhouse (1,189); Edinburg, TX
01/21/2016; 8:00 pm, ASN	at Cal State Bakersfield	L 58–77	6–14 (2–3)	Icardo Center (1,501); Bakersfield, CA
01/23/2016; 9:00 pm, WAC DN	at Seattle	L 59–70	6–15 (2–4)	KeyArena (1,752); Seattle, WA
01/30/2016; 8:00 pm, WAC DN	at New Mexico State	L 68–92	6–16 (2–5)	Pan American Center (4,710); Las Cruces, NM
02/04/2016; 7:00 pm, TWCS	Utah Valley	L 77–88	6–17 (2–6)	UTRGV Fieldhouse (1,211); Edinburg, TX
02/06/2016; 7:00 pm, TWCS	Grand Canyon	L 58–64	6–18 (2–7)	UTRGV Fieldhouse (1,128); Edinburg, TX
02/13/2016; 2:00 pm, WAC DN	at UMKC	L 58–75	6–19 (2–8)	Municipal Auditorium (1,670); Kansas City, MO
02/18/2016; 7:00 pm, TWCS	Seattle	W 67–57	7–19 (3–8)	UTRGV Fieldhouse (1,435); Edinburg, TX
02/20/2016; 7:00 pm, TWCS	Cal State Bakersfield	L 57–70	7–20 (3–9)	UTRGV Fieldhouse (1,299); Edinburg, TX
02/28/2016; 4:00 pm, ASN	at Chicago State	W 89–79	8–20 (4–9)	Emil and Patricia Jones Convocation Center (1,902); Chicago, IL
03/05/2016; 7:00 pm, TWCS	New Mexico State	L 44–83	8–21 (4–10)	UTRGV Fieldhouse (1,336); Edinburg, TX
WAC tournament
03/10/2016; 9:00 pm, WAC DN	vs. Seattle; Quarterfinals	L 52–75		Orleans Arena (1,472); Paradise, NV
*Non-conference game. ^{#}Rankings from AP Poll. (#) Tournament seedings in parentheses. All times are in Central.

== See also ==
- 2015–16 Texas–Rio Grande Valley Vaqueros women's basketball team
