= 2015–16 Utah Valley Wolverines men's basketball team =

American college basketball season

2015–16 Utah Valley Wolverines men's basketball
- Conference: Western Athletic Conference
- Record: 12–18 (6–8 WAC)
- Head coach: Mark Pope (1st season)
- Assistant coaches: Cody Fueger; Chris Burgess; Eric Daniels
- Home arena: UCCU Center

2015–16 WAC men's basketball standings
	Conf.				Overall
Team	W		L	PCT	W		L	PCT
New Mexico State	13	–	1	.929	23	–	11	.676
Grand Canyon *	11	–	3	.786	27	–	7	.794
Cal State Bakersfield †	11	–	3	.786	24	–	9	.727
Seattle	7	–	7	.500	15	–	17	.469
Utah Valley	6	–	8	.429	12	–	18	.400
UMKC	4	–	10	.286	12	–	19	.387
Texas–Rio Grande Valley	4	–	10	.286	8	–	22	.267
Chicago State	0	–	14	.000	4	–	28	.125
† 2016 WAC tournament winner * Ineligible for postseason during transition to Division I.

The 2015–16 Utah Valley Wolverines men's basketball team represented Utah Valley University in the 2015–16 NCAA Division I men's basketball season. This was the first year under head coach Mark Pope. They played their home games at the UCCU Center and were member of the Western Athletic Conference. They finished the season 12–18, 6–8 in WAC play to finish in fifth place. They lost in the quarterfinals of the WAC tournament to UMKC.

== Previous season ==
The Wolverines finished the season 11–19, 5–9 in WAC play to finish sixth in the WAC. They lost in the WAC Quarterfinals to UMKC to end their season. The season would be Dick Hunsaker's final season at Utah Valley as he chose to retire at the end of the season.

== Departures ==
Name	Number	Pos.	Height	Weight	Year	Hometown	Notes
Mitch Brunell	15	G	6'5"	--	RS Senior	Boise, ID	Graduated
Brenden Evans	20	F	6'5"	--	Senior	Sonora, CA	Graduated
Chad Ross	22	F	6'7"	--	Senior	Snellville, GA	Graduated

=== Incoming transfers ===
Name	Number	Pos.	Height	Weight	Year	Hometown	Previous School
Jordan Poydras	10	G	6'3"	170	Senior	Los Angeles, CA	Transferred from St. Cloud State. Under NCAA transfer rules, Poydras will have to sit out for the 2015–16 season. Will have one year of remaining eligibility.
Trae Young	13	G	6'2"		Junior	Missouri City, TX	Junior college transferred from Navarro College
Josh Pollard	15	G	6'4"	200	Sophomore	Cedar Hills, UT	Transferred from Kansas. Under NCAA transfer rules, Pollard will have to sit out for the 2015–16 season. Will have three years of remaining eligibility.
Isaac Neilson	22	C	6'10"	230	RS Sophomore	Mission Viejo, CA	Transferred from BYU. Under NCAA transfer rules, Neilson will have to sit out for the 2015–16 season. Will have three years of remaining eligibility.
Brandon Randolph	23	G	6'2"	189	Junior	Inglewood, CA	Transferred from Xavier. Under NCAA transfer rules, Poydras will have to sit out for the 2015–16 season. Will have two years of remaining eligibility.
Tyler Ott	25	G	6'5"	185	Sophomore	St. George, UT	Transferred from UC Davis. Under NCAA transfer rules, Ott will have to sit out for the 2015–16 season. Will have three years of remaining eligibility.
Andrew Bastien	42	C	6'9"	225	Junior	Orange, CA	Junior college transferred from Irvine Valley College

== Recruiting class of 2015 ==
College recruiting information
Name	Hometown	School	Height	Weight	Commit date
Richard Harward #70 C	Orem, UT	Orem High School	6 ft 9 in (2.06 m)	255 lb (116 kg)	Aug 11, 2014
Richard Harward #70 C	Recruit ratings: Scout: Rivals: (62)				
Telly Davenport #115 SF	Idaho Falls, ID	Bonneville High School	6 ft 4 in (1.93 m)	185 lb (84 kg)	
Telly Davenport #115 SF	Recruit ratings: Scout: Rivals: (59)				
Truman Moore; PF	Prescott, AZ	Gilbert High School	6 ft 8 in (2.03 m)	225 lb (102 kg)	Aug 29, 2014
Truman Moore; PF	Recruit ratings: Scout: Rivals: (NR)				
Overall recruit ranking:
Note: In many cases, Scout, Rivals, 247Sports, On3, and ESPN may conflict in their listings of height and weight.; In these cases, the average was taken. ESPN grades are on a 100-point scale.; Sources: "2015 Team Ranking". Rivals.

== Roster ==
2015–16 Utah Valley Wolverines men's basketball team
Players
Coaches

Pos.	#	Name	Height	Weight	Year	Previous school	Hometown
G	0	Marcel Davis	6 ft 2 in (1.88 m)	180 lb (82 kg)	Sr	American Fork; Utah State	American Fork, UT
G	1	Hayes Garrity	6 ft 1 in (1.85 m)	185 lb (84 kg)	RS Jr	Westview; Big Bend CC	Beaverton, OR
G	2	Jaden Jackson	6 ft 2 in (1.88 m)	185 lb (84 kg)	Sr	West Jordan; Salt Lake CC	Salt Lake City, UT
G	3	Telly Davenport	6 ft 3 in (1.91 m)	180 lb (82 kg)	Fr	Bonneville	Idaho Falls, ID
F	4	Darrious Hamilton	6 ft 9 in (2.06 m)	245 lb (111 kg)	Sr	Antonian Prep; Arizona Western	San Antonio, TX
G	5	Hayden Scheneck	6 ft 4 in (1.93 m)	195 lb (88 kg)	RS Fr	Weber; Salt Lake CC	Eden, UT
G	10	Jordan Poydras	6 ft 3 in (1.91 m)	185 lb (84 kg)	Sr	De Pere; St. Cloud State	Los Angeles, CA
G	11	Konner Frey (W)	6 ft 5 in (1.96 m)	210 lb (95 kg)	Jr	Viewmont; Utah State	Bountiful, UT
G	13	Ivory Young	6 ft 3 in (1.91 m)	185 lb (84 kg)	Jr	Strake Jesuit; Navarro College	Houston, TX
G	14	Cory Cardwell	6 ft 2 in (1.88 m)	180 lb (82 kg)	Sr	Riverton	Riverton, UT
G	15	Josh Pollard (I, W) (redshirt)	6 ft 5 in (1.96 m)	200 lb (91 kg)	So	Orem	Orem, UT
F	21	Zach Nelson	6 ft 7 in (2.01 m)	220 lb (100 kg)	Jr	Yuba City	Yuba City, CA
C	22	Isaac Neilson (I) (redshirt)	6 ft 10 in (2.08 m)	245 lb (111 kg)	RS So	Mission Viejo; BYU	Mission Viejo, CA
G	23	Brandon Randolph (I) (redshirt)	6 ft 2 in (1.88 m)	190 lb (86 kg)	Jr	Inglewood; Xavier	Inglewood, California
G	24	Alex Carr	6 ft 3 in (1.91 m)	200 lb (91 kg)	Sr	South Miner; Wabash Valley	Birmingham, AL
F	25	Tyler Ott (I, W) (redshirt)	6 ft 5 in (1.96 m)	200 lb (91 kg)	So	Desert Hills; UC Davis	St. George, UT
F	33	Dayon Goodman	6 ft 7 in (2.01 m)	220 lb (100 kg)	So	Kearns	Salt Lake City, UT
C	42	Andrew Bastien	6 ft 9 in (2.06 m)	235 lb (107 kg)	Jr	Orange Lutheran; Irvine Valley College	Tustin, CA

Head coach

- Mark Pope (Kentucky)

Assistant coach(es)

- Cody Fueger (Utah)
- Chris Burgess (Utah)
- Eric Daniels (Johnson & Wales)

Legend

- (C) Team captain
- (S) Suspended
- (I) Ineligible
- (W) Walk-on
- Injured
- Current redshirt

Roster

== Radio broadcasts and streams ==
All Wolverines games will air on KOVO, AKA ESPN 960 Sports. Games will be streamed online through ESPN 960's webpage as well as at Utah Valley's Stretch Internet feed.

== Schedule and results ==
Date time, TV	Opponent	Result	Record	Site (attendance) city, state
Exhibition
11/09/2015*; 7:00 pm	Western State	W 97–52		UCCU Center (505); Orem, UT
Non-conference regular season
11/13/2015*; 7:00 pm, BYUtv	at BYU; Old Oquirrh Bucket	L 54–85	0–1	Marriott Center (17,683); Provo, UT
11/14/2015*; 7:00 pm, YouTube	Great Falls (MT)	W 89–60	1–1	UCCU Center (2,254); Orem, UT
11/18/2015*; 7:00 pm	at Denver	L 62–75	1–2	Magness Arena (1,128); Denver, CO
11/20/2015*; 7:00 pm, YouTube	Antelope Valley	W 101–60	2–2	PE Building (1,427); Orem, UT
11/24/2015*; 7:00 pm, MW Net	at Utah State; Old Oquirrh Bucket	L 55–81	2–3	Smith Spectrum (8,632); Logan, UT
11/28/2015*; 7:00 pm, YouTube	UC Davis	L 70–82	2–4	UCCU Center (2,318); Orem, UT
12/01/2015*; 7:00 pm, WAC DN	Montana State	L 72–76	2–5	UCCU Center (1,135); Orem, UT
12/05/2015*; 7:00 pm, UVUtv	Southern Utah; Old Oquirrh Bucket	L 54–68	2–6	UCCU Center (2,233); Orem, UT
12/09/2015*; 7:00 pm, UVUtv	Weber State; Old Oquirrh Bucket	W 84–81 ^{2OT}	3–6	UCCU Center (2,860); Orem, UT
12/12/2015*; 7:00 pm, Watch Big Sky	at Idaho State	W 100–76	4–6	Holt Arena (1,622); Pocatello, ID
12/19/2015*; 4:00 pm	at UTSA	W 83–78	5–6	Convocation Center (1,098); San Antonio, TX
12/22/2015*; 4:15 pm	vs. UNC Wilmington; Billy Minardi Classic	L 77–102	5–7	KFC Yum! Center (19,419); Louisville, KY
12/23/2015*; 5:00 pm, ESPNU	at Louisville; Billy Minardi Classic	L 68–98	5–8	KFC Yum! Center (19,146); Louisville, KY
12/28/2015*; 8:00 pm, TheW.tv	at Saint Mary's	L 50–65	5–9	McKeon Pavilion (2,113); Moraga, CA
01/02/2016*; 7:00 pm, YouTube	San Diego Christian	W 88–79	6–9	UCCU Center (1,578); Orem, UT
WAC regular season
01/07/2016; 7:00 pm, ASN	New Mexico State	L 66–78	6–10 (0–1)	UCCU Center (3,155); Orem, UT
01/09/2016; 7:00 pm, UVUtv	Texas–Rio Grande Valley	W 98–65	7–10 (1–1)	UCCU Center (1,881); Orem, UT
01/16/2016; 7:00 pm, WAC DN	at Grand Canyon	L 88–99	7–11 (1–2)	GCU Arena (4,672); Phoenix, AZ
01/21/2016; 6:05 pm, WAC DN	at UMKC	W 90–79	8–11 (2–2)	Municipal Auditorium (957); Kansas City, MO
01/23/2016; 1:00 pm	at Chicago State	W 82–76	9–11 (3–2)	Emil and Patricia Jones Convocation Center (957); Chicago, IL
01/28/2016; 7:00 pm, UVUtv	Seattle	L 62–73	9–12 (3–3)	UCCU Center (2,629); Orem, UT
01/30/2016; 7:00 pm, UVUtv	Cal State Bakersfield	L 74–78	9–13 (3–4)	UCCU Center (2,952); Orem, UT
02/04/2016; 6:00 pm, WAC DN	at Texas–Rio Grande Valley	W 88–77	10–13 (4–4)	UTRGV Fieldhouse (1,211); Edinburg, TX
02/06/2016; 7:00 pm, WAC DN	at New Mexico State	L 74–98	10–14 (4–5)	Pan American Center (4,476); Las Cruces, NM
02/13/2016; 8:00 pm, ASN	at Cal State Bakersfield	L 69–91	10–15 (4–6)	Icardo Center (1,765); Bakersfield, CA
02/18/2016; 7:00 pm, UVUtv	Chicago State	W 74–72	11–15 (5–6)	UCCU Center (2,115); Orem, UT
02/20/2016; 7:00 pm, UVUtv	UMKC	W 79–70	12–15 (6–6)	UCCU Center (2,981); Orem, UT
02/27/2016; 8:00 pm	at Seattle	L 69–72	12–16 (6–7)	KeyArena (2,767); Seattle, WA
03/05/2016; 2:00 pm, ASN	Grand Canyon	L 79–86	12–17 (6–8)	UCCU Center (3,854); Orem, UT
WAC tournament
03/10/2016; 3:00 pm, WAC DN	vs. UMKC; Quarterfinals	L 78–80	12–18	Orleans Arena; Paradise, NV
*Non-conference game. ^{#}Rankings from AP Poll. (#) Tournament seedings in parentheses. All times are in Mountain Time.
