= 2015–16 Chicago State Cougars men's basketball team =

American college basketball season

2015–16 Chicago State Cougars men's basketball
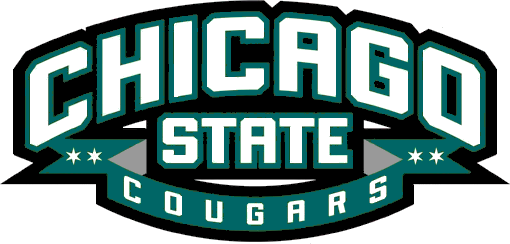
- Conference: Western Athletic Conference
- Record: 4–28 (0–14 WAC)
- Head coach: Tracy Dildy (6th season)
- Assistant coaches: James Farr; Sean Pryor; Matt Raidbard
- Home arena: Emil and Patricia Jones Convocation Center

2015–16 WAC men's basketball standings
	Conf.				Overall
Team	W		L	PCT	W		L	PCT
New Mexico State	13	–	1	.929	23	–	11	.676
Grand Canyon *	11	–	3	.786	27	–	7	.794
Cal State Bakersfield †	11	–	3	.786	24	–	9	.727
Seattle	7	–	7	.500	15	–	17	.469
Utah Valley	6	–	8	.429	12	–	18	.400
UMKC	4	–	10	.286	12	–	19	.387
Texas–Rio Grande Valley	4	–	10	.286	8	–	22	.267
Chicago State	0	–	14	.000	4	–	28	.125
† 2016 WAC tournament winner * Ineligible for postseason during transition to Division I.

The 2015–16 Chicago State Cougars men's basketball team represented Chicago State University during the 2015–16 NCAA Division I men's basketball season. The Cougars, led by sixth year head coach Tracy Dildy, played their home games at the Emil and Patricia Jones Convocation Center and were members of the Western Athletic Conference. They finished the season 4–28, 0–14 in WAC play to finish in last place. They lost in the quarterfinals of the WAC tournament to Cal State Bakersfield.

== Previous season ==
The Cougars finished the season 8–24, 4–10 in WAC play to finish in a tie for seventh place. They lost in the quarterfinals of the WAC tournament to Seattle.

== Departures ==
Name	Number	Pos.	Height	Weight	Year	Hometown	Notes
Sean Hill	0	G	6'2"	180	Senior	Chicago, IL	Graduated
Joshua Meier	1	F	6'8"	215	Freshman	Justice, IL	Transferred to Kirkwood Community College
Anthony Glover	2	G	6'2"	175	Freshman	Toledo, OH	Transferred to Indiana (PA)
Johnny Griffin	3	G	6'5"	190	Sophomore	Ford Heights, IL	Transferred
Kurt Karis	10	G	6'1"	190	Sophomore	Northbrook, IL	Transferred to USC
Rahjan Muhammad	14	G	6'0"	190	Senior	Bolingbrook, IL	Graduated
Elijah Robertson	15	G/F	6'5"	185	Freshman	Bolingbrook, IL	Walk-on; didn't return
Aaron Williams	23	F	6'6"	205	RS Senior	Chicago, IL	Graduated
Sharieff Medlock	25	G	6'3"	185	Freshman	Chicago, IL	Transferred to Florida State College
Clarke Rosenberg	35	G	6'4"	195	Senior	Skokie, IL	Graduated
Michael Johnson	42	F	6'8"	230	Senior	Chicago, IL	Graduated
Jesse Tesmer	45	F	6'8"	225	Junior	Greencastle, IN	Transferred to Illinois-Springfield

=== Incoming transfers ===
Name	Number	Pos.	Height	Weight	Year	Hometown	Previous School
Clemmye Owens	2	G	6'1"	185	Junior	Toledo, OH	Transferred from Bethune-Cookman. Under NCAA transfer rules, Owens will have to sit out for the 2015–16 season. Will have two years of remaining eligibility.

== 2015 incoming recruits ==
College recruiting information
Name	Hometown	School	Height	Weight	Commit date
Elliott Cole; PG	Westchester, IL	Gulf Coast Community College	5 ft 9 in (1.75 m)	153 lb (69 kg)	Mar 24, 2015
Elliott Cole; PG	Recruit ratings: Scout: Rivals: (JC)				
Jordan Madrid-Andrews; PF	Denver, CO	Umpqua Community College	6 ft 7 in (2.01 m)	N/A	Mar 24, 2015
Jordan Madrid-Andrews; PF	Recruit ratings: Scout: Rivals: (JC)				
Overall recruit ranking:
Note: In many cases, Scout, Rivals, 247Sports, On3, and ESPN may conflict in their listings of height and weight.; In these cases, the average was taken. ESPN grades are on a 100-point scale.; Sources: "2015 Team Ranking". Rivals.

== Roster ==
2015–16 Chicago State Cougars men's basketball team
Players
Coaches

Pos.	#	Name	Height	Weight	Year	Previous school	Hometown
G/F	0	Jawad Adekoya	6 ft 6 in (1.98 m)	190 lb (86 kg)	Sr	Andrew; Kankakee CC	Tinley Park, IL
G	1	Kieran Woods	6 ft 2 in (1.88 m)	185 lb (84 kg)	Sr	Crane; Lamar State College–Port Arthur	Chicago, IL
G	2	Clemmye Owens V (I) (redshirt)	6 ft 2 in (1.88 m)	185 lb (84 kg)	Jr	Rogers; Bethune-Cookman	Toledo, OH
G	3	Elliot Cole	5 ft 11 in (1.8 m)	170 lb (77 kg)	Jr	Powerhouse; Gulf Coast State College	Chicago, IL
G	5	Anthony Eaves	6 ft 1 in (1.85 m)	152 lb (69 kg)	Fr	Ballard	Louisville, KY
G	10	Fred Sims, Jr. (W)	6 ft 4 in (1.93 m)	193 lb (88 kg)	Fr	North Lawndale	Chicago, IL
G/F	11	Jared Dimakos	6 ft 5 in (1.96 m)	205 lb (93 kg)	RS Sr	Lake Forest Academy; Triton College	Lincolnshire, IL
G	14	Delundre Dixon	6 ft 3 in (1.91 m)	180 lb (82 kg)	Fr	Auburn	Rockford, IL
G/F	15	Trayvon Palmer	6 ft 4 in (1.93 m)	185 lb (84 kg)	Jr	Brown Deer; North Dakota State College of Science	Milwaukee, WI
G	21	Joshua Batson	6 ft 0 in (1.83 m)	175 lb (79 kg)	Jr	Curie	Chicago, IL
G	30	Gentry Hunt (W)	6 ft 3 in (1.91 m)	180 lb (82 kg)	So	Homewood-Flossmoor; Northeaster JC=	Glenwood, IL
G	32	Montana Byrd	6 ft 4 in (1.93 m)	215 lb (98 kg)	So	Mount Carmel	Chicago, IL
F	33	Jordan Madrid-Andrews	6 ft 8 in (2.03 m)	240 lb (109 kg)	Jr	Bishop Machebeuf; Umpqua CC	Denver, CO
F	35	Devon Friend	6 ft 6 in (1.98 m)	220 lb (100 kg)	Sr	Bolingbrook; State College of Florida	Joliet, IL
C	44	Quron Davis	6 ft 10 in (2.08 m)	235 lb (107 kg)	Jr	Simeon	Chicago, IL

Head coach

- Tracy Dildy (UIC)

Assistant coach(es)

- James Farr (Creighton)
- Sean Pryor (Oregon State)
- Matt Raidbard (Indiana)

Legend

- (C) Team captain
- (S) Suspended
- (I) Ineligible
- (W) Walk-on
- Injured
- Current redshirt

Roster

== Schedule and results ==
Date time, TV	Opponent	Result	Record	Site (attendance) city, state
Regular season
11/13/2015*; 7:05 pm	Illinois Tech	W 137–59	1–0	Emil and Patricia Jones Convocation Center (510); Chicago, IL
11/16/2015*; 7:00 pm, ESPN3	at No. 7 Iowa State; Emerald Coast Classic	L 64–106	1–1	Hilton Coliseum (14,111); Ames, IA
11/18/2015*; 7:05 pm	IU–Northwest	W 105–64	2–1	Emil and Patricia Jones Convocation Center (393); Chicago, IL
11/21/2015*; 7:05 pm	Trinity International	W 81–70	3–1	Emil and Patricia Jones Convocation Center (315); Chicago, IL
11/23/2015*; 7:00 pm, BTN	at Illinois; Emerald Coast Classic	L 79–82	3–2	Prairie Capital Convention Center (5,023); Springfield, IL
11/27/2015*; 1:30 pm	vs. Jacksonville State; Emerald Coast Classic	L 65–68	3–3	Northwest Florida State College (250); Niceville, FL
11/28/2015*; 10:30 am	vs. Alabama State; Emerald Coast Classic	L 64–66	3–4	Northwest Florida State College (250); Niceville, FL
12/02/2015*; 7:00 pm	at Northern Illinois	L 58–80	3–5	Convocation Center (1,047); DeKalb, IL
12/05/2015*; 1:00 pm, FS1	at DePaul	L 72–96	3–6	Allstate Arena (5,215); Rosemont, IL
12/11/2015*; 7:05 pm, WAC DN	Valparaiso	L 53–71	3–7	Emil and Patricia Jones Convocation Center (1,733); Chicago, IL
12/13/2015*; 6:00 pm, BTN	at Northwestern	L 35–77	3–8	Welsh-Ryan Arena (6,621); Evanston, IL
12/16/2015*; 7:00 pm, BTN	at Minnesota	L 52–70	3–9	Williams Arena (10,175); Minneapolis, MN
12/19/2015*; 4:35 pm, WAC DN	Western Illinois	W 77–70	4–9	Emil and Patricia Jones Convocation Center (1,788); Chicago, IL
12/21/2015*; 6:00 pm, FS1	at Marquette	L 74–91	4–10	BMO Harris Bradley Center (11,937); Milwaukee, WI
12/28/2015*; 6:00 pm, ESPN3	at Oakland	L 93–101	4–11	Athletics Center O'rena (2,016); Rochester, MI
12/31/2015*; 1:00 pm	at Ball State	L 48–73	4–12	John E. Worthen Arena (2,251); Muncie, IN
01/09/2016; 2:05 pm	Seattle	L 50–66	4–13 (0–1)	Emil and Patricia Jones Convocation Center (560); Chicago, IL
01/11/2016; 2:05 pm	Cal State Bakersfield	L 56–67	4–14 (0–2)	Emil and Patricia Jones Convocation Center (450); Chicago, IL
01/14/2016; 7:00 pm, WAC DN	at Texas–Rio Grande Valley	L 72–82	4–15 (0–3)	UTRGV Fieldhouse (1,211); Edinburg, VA
01/16/2016; 8:00 pm	at New Mexico State	L 62–80	4–16 (0–4)	Pan American Center (4,301); Las Cruces, NM
01/19/2016*; 7:05 pm, WAC DN	Green Bay	L 66-99	5–17	Emil and Patricia Jones Convocation Center (1,032); Chicago, IL
01/21/2016; 7:05 pm, WAC DN	Grand Canyon	L 65–90	4–18 (0–5)	Emil and Patricia Jones Convocation Center (1,783); Chicago, IL
01/23/2016; 2:05 pm	Utah Valley	L 76–82	4–19 (0–6)	Emil and Patricia Jones Convocation Center (957); Chicago, IL
01/30/2016; 2:00 pm, WAC DN	at UMKC	L 64–78	4–20 (0–7)	Municipal Auditorium (1,526); Kansas City, MO
02/04/2016; 9:00 pm, ASN	at Seattle	L 56–59	4–21 (0–8)	KeyArena (1,527); Seattle, WA
02/06/2016; 9:00 pm, WAC DN	at Cal State Bakersfield	L 48–71	4–22 (0–9)	Icardo Center (1,901); Bakersfield, CA
02/13/2016; 7:05 pm	New Mexico State	L 55–69	4–23 (0–10)	Emil and Patricia Jones Convocation Center (813); Chicago, IL
02/18/2016; 8:00 pm	at Utah Valley	L 72–74	4–24 (0–11)	UCCU Center (2,115); Orem, UT
02/20/2016; 9:00 pm	at Grand Canyon	L 52–67	4–25 (0–12)	GCU Arena (7,223); Phoenix, AZ
02/27/2016; 2:05 pm	Texas–Rio Grande Valley	L 79–89	4–26 (0–13)	Emil and Patricia Jones Convocation Center (1,902); Chicago, IL
03/05/2016; 2:05 pm	UMKC	L 53–82	4–27 (0–14)	Emil and Patricia Jones Convocation Center (1,957); Chicago, IL
WAC tournament
03/10/2016; 6:30 pm, WAC DN	vs. Cal State Bakersfield; Quarterfinals	L 57–79	4–28	Orleans Arena; Paradise, NV
*Non-conference game. ^{#}Rankings from AP Poll. (#) Tournament seedings in parentheses. All times are in Central.
