= 2015–16 New Mexico State Aggies men's basketball team =

American college basketball season

2015–16 New Mexico State Aggies men's basketball

WAC regular season champions

NIT, First round
- Conference: Western Athletic Conference
- Record: 23–11 (13–1 WAC)
- Head coach: Marvin Menzies (9th season)
- Assistant coaches: Paul Weir; Keith Brown; Aerick Sanders
- Home arena: Pan American Center

2015–16 WAC men's basketball standings
	Conf.				Overall
Team	W		L	PCT	W		L	PCT
New Mexico State	13	–	1	.929	23	–	11	.676
Grand Canyon *	11	–	3	.786	27	–	7	.794
Cal State Bakersfield †	11	–	3	.786	24	–	9	.727
Seattle	7	–	7	.500	15	–	17	.469
Utah Valley	6	–	8	.429	12	–	18	.400
UMKC	4	–	10	.286	12	–	19	.387
Texas–Rio Grande Valley	4	–	10	.286	8	–	22	.267
Chicago State	0	–	14	.000	4	–	28	.125
† 2016 WAC tournament winner * Ineligible for postseason during transition to Division I.

The 2015–16 New Mexico State Aggies men's basketball team represented New Mexico State University during the 2015–16 NCAA Division I men's basketball season. The Aggies, led by ninth year head coach Marvin Menzies, played their home games at the Pan American Center in Las Cruces, New Mexico and were members of the Western Athletic Conference. They finished the season 23–11, 13–1 in WAC play to win the WAC regular season championship. They defeated UMKC to advance to the championship game of the WAC tournament where they lost to Cal State Bakersfield. As a regular season conference champion who failed to win their conference tournament, they received an automatic bid to the National Invitation Tournament where they lost in the first round to Saint Mary's.

On April 16, 2016, head coach Marvin Menzies left the school to accept the head coaching position at UNLV. On April 26, the school hired Paul Weir, an assistant coach under Menzies, as head coach.

== Previous season ==
The Aggies finished the 2014–15 season with an overall record 23–11, 13–1 in WAC play to win the regular season WAC championship. They defeated Cal State Bakersfield and Seattle to be champions of the WAC tournament. They received an automatic bid to the NCAA tournament where they lost in the second round to Kansas.

== Departures ==
Name	Number	Pos.	Height	Weight	Year	Hometown	Notes
D.K. Eldridge	1	G	6'2"	180	Senior	Dallas, TX	Graduated
Remi Barry	3	F	6'8"	225	Senior	Paris, France	Graduated
Tshilidzi Nephawe	15	C	6'10"	268	RS Senior	Johannesburg, South Africa	Graduated
Daniel Mullings	23	G	6'2"	170	Senior	Toronto, ON	Graduated
Aaron Kubinski	34	F	6'5"	195	RS Sophomore	Albuquerque, NM	Left the team for personal reasons
Anthony January	44	F	6'8"	200	Sophomore	Los Angeles, CA	Transferred to Cal State San Bernardino

== 2015 Recruiting Class ==
College recruiting information
Name	Hometown	School	Height	Weight	Commit date
Jermaine Haley; PG	Burnaby, BC	Sunrise Christian Academy	6 ft 7 in (2.01 m)	185 lb (84 kg)	Jul 14, 2026
Jermaine Haley; PG	Recruit ratings: Scout: Rivals: 247Sports: (80)				
Bollo Gnahore; C	Abidjan, Ivory Coast	New Hope Christian Academy	6 ft 11 in (2.11 m)	260 lb (120 kg)	
Bollo Gnahore; C	Recruit ratings: Rivals:				
Overall recruit ranking:
Note: In many cases, Scout, Rivals, 247Sports, On3, and ESPN may conflict in their listings of height and weight.; In these cases, the average was taken. ESPN grades are on a 100-point scale.; Sources: "2015 New Mexico State Basketball Commits". ESPN.

== Roster ==
2015–16 New Mexico State Aggies men's basketball team
Players
Coaches

Pos.	#	Name	Height	Weight	Year	Previous school	Hometown
G	0	Travon Landry (injured)	6 ft 1 in (1.85 m)	176 lb (80 kg)	Jr	Huntington Prep	San Antonio, TX
F	1	Harold Givens	6 ft 7 in (2.01 m)	200 lb (91 kg)	RS Fr	Faith Baptist Christian	Norcross, GA
G	2	Braxton Huggins	6 ft 5 in (1.96 m)	180 lb (82 kg)	So	Mira Monte HS	Bakersfield, CA
G	4	Ian Baker	6 ft 0 in (1.83 m)	180 lb (82 kg)	Jr	Arlington Country Day HS	Washington, D.C.
G	5	Matt Taylor	6 ft 5 in (1.96 m)	180 lb (82 kg)	So	Future College Prep	Toronto, ON
G	10	Rashawn Browne	6 ft 1 in (1.85 m)	170 lb (77 kg)	RS Fr	Bill Crothers Secondary	Toronto, ON
F	11	Johnathon Wilkins	6 ft 10 in (2.08 m)	225 lb (102 kg)	So	La Lumiere HS	Lille, France
F	14	Jose Campo	6 ft 11 in (2.11 m)	207 lb (94 kg)	RS Fr	West Oaks Academy	Riohacha, Colombia
G	15	Rene Esparza	6 ft 3 in (1.91 m)	175 lb (79 kg)	Jr	New Mexico JC; Faith Christian Acad.	Ciudad Juárez, Mexico
G	20	Sidy Ndir	6 ft 2 in (1.88 m)	180 lb (82 kg)	RS Fr	West Oaks Academy	Cosne-Cours-sur-Loire, France
C	21	Tanveer Bhullar	7 ft 3 in (2.21 m)	335 lb (152 kg)	RS So	Father Henry Carr Secondary	Toronto, ON
F	22	Eli Chuha	6 ft 8 in (2.03 m)	217 lb (98 kg)	RS Fr	Redlands East Valley	Redlands, CA
G	35	Jalyn Pennie	6 ft 7 in (2.01 m)	180 lb (82 kg)	So	Christian Faith Center Academy	Toronto, ON
F	43	Pascal Siakam	6 ft 9 in (2.06 m)	230 lb (104 kg)	So	God's Academy	Douala, Cameroon
G		Jermaine Haley (redshirt)	6 ft 7 in (2.01 m)	185 lb (84 kg)	Fr	Sunrise Christian Academy	Burnaby, BC
C		Bollo Gnahore (redshirt)	6 ft 11 in (2.11 m)	260 lb (118 kg)	Fr	New Hope Christian Academy	Abidjan, Ivory Coast

Head coach

- Marvin Menzies (UCLA)

Assistant coach(es)

- Paul Weir (York)
- Keith Brown (Pacific)
- Aerick Sanders (San Diego State)

Legend

- (C) Team captain
- (S) Suspended
- (I) Ineligible
- (W) Walk-on
- Injured
- Current redshirt

Roster

== Schedule ==
Date time, TV	Rank^{#}	Opponent^{#}	Result	Record	High points	High rebounds	High assists	Site (attendance) city, state
Exhibition
Nov 02, 2015*; 7:00 pm		Western New Mexico	W 80–39		17 – Siakam	13 – Chuha	3 – Baker	Pan American Center (3,813); Las Cruces, NM
Regular season
Nov 13, 2015*; 7:00 pm, AggieVision		Houston Baptist	W 91–69	1–0	28 – Siakam	11 – Siakam	5 – Esparza	Pan American Center (5,130); Las Cruces, NM
Nov 15, 2015*; 7:00 pm, AggieVision		New Mexico; Rio Grande Rivalry	L 74–83	1–1	23 – Siakam	9 – Bhullar	2 – Baker	Pan American Center (6,796); Las Cruces, NM
Nov 18, 2015*; 7:00 pm, AggieVision		Tennessee Tech; Air Force Classic	W 76–63	2–1	30 – Siakam	11 – Siakam	4 – Siakam	Pan American Center (4,104); Las Cruces, NM
Nov 21, 2015*; 7:00 pm, AggieVision		Mississippi Valley State; Air Force Classic	W 85–46	3–1	19 – Siakam	16 – Siakam	7 – Baker	Pan American Center (4,346); Las Cruces, NM
Nov 24, 2015*; 7:30 pm, AggieVision		Robert Morris; Air Force Classic	W 81–71 ^{OT}	4–1	35 – Siakam	13 – Siakam	5 – Baker	Pan American Center (4,115); Las Cruces, NM
Nov 28, 2015*; 12:00 pm		at Air Force; Air Force Classic	L 64–66 ^{OT}	4–2	26 – Siakam	12 – Siakam	4 – Baker	Clune Arena (1,034); Colorado Springs, CO
Dec 02, 2015*; 7:00 pm, AggieVision		UTEP; Battle of I-10	W 73–59	5–2	24 – Siakam	23 – Siakam	4 – Taylor/Browne	Pan American Center (6,303); Las Cruces, NM
Dec 05, 2015*; 5:00 pm		at Long Beach State	L 53–67	5–3	14 – Siakam	11 – Siakam	3 – Baker/Taylor	Walter Pyramid (2,376); Long Beach, CA
Dec 13, 2015*; 7:00 pm, AggieVision		Wyoming	L 59–62	5–4	20 – Baker	15 – Siakam	3 – Baker/Taylor	Pan American Center (4,562); Las Cruces, NM
Dec 16, 2015*; 7:00 pm, ESPN3		at New Mexico; Rio Grande Rivalry	L 61–79	5–5	21 – Siakam	9 – Bhullar	5 – Browne	The Pit (15,362); Albuquerque, NM
Dec 19, 2015*; 7:00 pm, ASN		at UTEP; Battle of I-10	W 73–53	6–5	26 – Baker	10 – Siakam	8 – Taylor	Don Haskins Center (9,040); El Paso, TX
Dec 21, 2015*; 7:00 pm, AggieVision		Oral Roberts	W 76–61	7–5	35 – Siakam	11 – Siakam	4 – Baker	Pan American Center (4,315); Las Cruces, NM
Dec 23, 2015*; 6:00 pm		at Baylor	L 70–85	7–6	26 – Siakam	10 – Siakam	5 – Taylor/Pennie	Ferrell Center (5,842); Waco, TX
Dec 30, 2015*; 7:00 pm, AggieVision		Arizona Christian	W 81–61	8–6	28 – Siakam	10 – Siakam	4 – Baker/Taylor/Siakam	Pan American Center (4,210); Las Cruces, NM
Jan 02, 2016*; 8:00 pm		at UC Irvine	L 52–54	8–7	17 – Siakam	10 – Siakam	6 – Siakam	Bren Events Center (2,866); Irvine, CA
Jan 07, 2016; 7:00 pm, ASN		at Utah Valley	W 78–66	9–7 (1–0)	20 – Siakam	11 – Siakam	6 – Baker	UCCU Center (3,155); Orem, UT
Jan 09, 2016; 7:00 pm		at Grand Canyon	L 75–79	9–8 (1–1)	17 – Siakam	12 – Siakam	8 – Baker	GCU Arena (7,413); Phoenix, AZ
Jan 14, 2016; 7:00 pm, ASN		UMKC	W 65–64	10–8 (2–1)	16 – Baker	15 – Siakam	6 – Taylor	Pan American Center (4,187); Las Cruces, NM
Jan 16, 2016; 7:00 pm, AggieVision		Chicago State	W 80–62	11–8 (3–1)	21 – Siakam	13 – Siakam	5 – Baker	Pan American Center (4,301); Las Cruces, NM
Jan 21, 2016; 8:00 pm		at Seattle	W 68–60	12–8 (4–1)	21 – Siakam	11 – Siakam	2 – Baker/Pennie/Siakam	KeyArena (1,365); Seattle, WA
Jan 23, 2016; 8:00 pm		Cal State Bakersfield	W 68–67 ^{2OT}	13–8 (5–1)	21 – Siakam	10 – Baker	6 – Baker	Icardo Center (3,880); Bakersfield, CA
Jan 30, 2016; 7:00 pm, AggieVision		Texas–Rio Grande Valley	W 92–68	14–8 (6–1)	24 – Siakam	16 – Siakam	5 – Baker	Pan American Center (4,710); Las Cruces, NM
Feb 04, 2016; 7:00 pm, AggieVision		Grand Canyon	W 70–50	15–8 (7–1)	17 – Siakam	16 – Siakam	4 – Baker	Pan American Center (5,509); Las Cruces, NM
Feb 06, 2016; 7:00 pm, AggieVision		Utah Valley	W 98–74	16–8 (8–1)	27 – Siakam	11 – Siakam	4 – Siakam	Pan American Center (4,476); Las Cruces, NM
Feb 08, 2016*; 7:00 pm		vs. Northern New Mexico	W 85–54	17–8	14 – Bhullar	6 – Siakam/Bhullar	4 – Ndir	Santa Ana Star Center (2,306); Rio Rancho, NM
Feb 13, 2016; 1:05 pm		at Chicago State	W 69–55	18–8 (9–1)	24 – Siakam	8 – Siakam	7 – Taylor	Jones Convocation Center (813); Chicago, IL
Feb 15, 2015*; 6:00 pm		at Wichita State; Postponed from Dec 28, 2015	L 41–71	18–9	17 – Siakam	10 – Siakam	2 – Taylor	Charles Koch Arena (10,506); Wichita, KS
Feb 18, 2016; 7:00 pm, AggieVision		Cal State Bakersfield	W 63–55	19–9 (10–1)	16 – Baker	12 – Siakam	3 – Siakam	Pan American Center (4,550); Las Cruces, NM
Feb 20, 2016; 7:00 pm, AggieVision		Seattle	W 70–57	20–9 (11–1)	22 – Huggins	18 – Siakam	4 – Baker	Pan American Center (4,669); Las Cruces, NM
Feb 27, 2016; 1:00 pm, AggieVision		at UMKC	W 62–61	21–9 (12–1)	17 – Siakam	11 – Siakam	4 – Baker	Municipal Auditorium (2,551); Kansas City, MO
Mar 05, 2016; 6:00 pm		at Texas–Rio Grande Valley	W 83–44	22–9 (13–1)	24 – Siakam	10 – Siakam	6 – Baker	UTRGV Fieldhouse (1,336); Edinburg, TX
WAC tournament
Mar 11, 2016; 7:00 pm	(1)	vs. (5) UMKC; Semifinals	W 78–64	23–9	20 – Baker	11 – Siakam	2 – Baker/Siakam/Wilkins	Orleans Arena; Paradise, NV
Mar 12, 2016; 9:00 pm, ESPNU	(1)	vs. (2) Cal State Bakersfield; Championship game	L 54–57	23–10	13 – Bhullar	11 – Bhullar	3 – Baker	Orleans Arena (1,673); Paradise, NV
NIT
Mar 15, 2016*; 9:00 pm, ESPN2	(7)	(2) Saint Mary's; First round – Valparaiso Bracket	L 56–58	23–11	19 – Siakam	14 – Siakam	7 – Baker	McKeon Pavilion (1,154); Moraga, CA
*Non-conference game. ^{#}Rankings from AP Poll. (#) Tournament seedings in parentheses. All times are in Mountain Time.
