= Rod Barnes =

American college basketball coach

Current position
- Title: Head coach
- Team: Itawamba
- Conference: MACCC

Biographical details
- Born: January 8, 1966 (age 60); Satartia, Mississippi, U.S.

Playing career
- 1985–1988: Ole Miss

Coaching career (HC unless noted)
- 1990–1993: West Alabama (assistant)
- 1993–1998: Ole Miss (assistant)
- 1998–2006: Ole Miss
- 2006–2007: Oklahoma (assistant)
- 2007–2011: Georgia State
- 2011–2025: Cal State Bakersfield
- 2026–present: Itawamba CC

Head coaching record
- Overall: 396–420 (.485)
- Tournaments: 3–4 (NCAA Division I); 5–2 (NIT); 2–2 (CIT)

Accomplishments and honors

Championships
- SEC West Division (2001); WAC regular season (2017); WAC tournament (2016)

Awards
- Naismith College Coach of the Year (2001); Hugh Durham Award (2017); SEC Coach of the Year (2001); 2× WAC Coach of the Year (2016, 2017)

Rodrick Kenneth Barnes (born January 8, 1966) is an American college basketball coach. He was most recently the head men's basketball coach at California State University, Bakersfield, a position he held from 2011 to 2025. Barnes held the same position at the University of Mississippi (Ole Miss) from 1998 to 2006 and Georgia State University from 2007 to 2011.

== Playing and early coaching career ==
Barnes played college basketball at the University of Mississippi of the NCAA Division I's Southeastern Conference from 1985 to 1988. He earned All-SEC and All-America honorable mention honors in 1988. Barnes earned his business administration degree in 1989 and left Ole Miss to become an assistant coach at Livingston University in 1990. In 1993, Barnes returned to Ole Miss to serve as an assistant coach to Rob Evans. Barnes helped coach Ole Miss to consecutive 20-win seasons and NCAA Men's Division I Basketball Championship berths in 1997 and 1998.

== Head coaching career ==
When Evans departed for Arizona State University in 1998, Barnes was promoted to head coach of Ole Miss. Barnes coached them for eight seasons, building a 141–109 record. In his first year, Barnes tallied Ole Miss' first-ever NCAA Tournament win. The Rebels had been one of the few longstanding members of a "power conference" to have never won an NCAA Tournament game. He was named 2001 Naismith College Coach of the Year and the 2001 SEC Coach of the Year after leading Ole Miss to a school-record 27-win season in 2000–01 which included a trip to the Sweet Sixteen round of the NCAA Men's Division I Basketball Championship—the deepest NCAA tournament run in school history.

However, Barnes would only garner one other winning season after the Sweet 16 appearance. He was fired after the 2005–06 season in which Ole Miss started 13–3 but lost 13 of their last 14 games. Barnes served as an assistant coach at the Oklahoma during the 2006–07 season.

On March 19, 2007, Barnes was hired as the head coach of the men's basketball team at Georgia State University of the NCAA Division I's Colonial Athletic Association. On February 26, 2011, it was announced that Barnes would not return as head coach at Georgia State. On March 30, 2011 Rod Barnes was named head men's basketball coach at Cal State Bakersfield.

In his fifth season in Bakersfield, Barnes led the Roadrunners to the programs' first appearance in the NCAA Men's Division I Basketball Championship. CSUB earned its berth with a buzzer-beating victory over New Mexico State in the finals of the Western Athletic Conference Tournament. Barnes's squad fell to Oklahoma in the first round of the NCAA Tournament, but he earned a five-year contract extension at the end of the campaign. He was also named a finalist for the Ben Jobe Award, given annually to the top minority coach in NCAA Division I Men's Basketball.

Barnes suddenly resigned from his position at Bakersfield on September 24, 2025, following allegations against former assistant coach Kevin Mays.

== Head coaching record ==
Record table
Season	Team	Overall	Conference	Standing	Postseason
Ole Miss Rebels (Southeastern Conference) (1998–2006)
1998–99	Ole Miss	20–13	8–8	T–3rd (West)	NCAA Division I second round
1999–00	Ole Miss	19–14	5–11	T–5th (West)	NIT quarterfinal
2000–01	Ole Miss	27–8	11–5	1st (West)	NCAA Division I Sweet 16
2001–02	Ole Miss	20–11	9–7	3rd (West)	NCAA Division I first round
2002–03	Ole Miss	14–15	4–12	T–5th (West)	
2003–04	Ole Miss	13–15	5–11	T–4th (West)	
2004–05	Ole Miss	14–17	4–12	T–5th (West)	
2005–06	Ole Miss	14–16	4–12	T–5th (West)	
Ole Miss:		141–109 (.564)	50–78 (.391)		
Georgia State Panthers (Colonial Athletic Association) (2007–2011)
2007–08	Georgia State	9–21	5–13	12th	
2008–09	Georgia State	12–20	8–10	8th	
2009–10	Georgia State	12–20	5–13	9th	
2010–11	Georgia State	12–19	6–12	9th	
Georgia State:		45–80 (.360)	24–48 (.333)		
Cal State Bakersfield Roadrunners (NCAA Division I independent) (2011–2013)
2011–12	Cal State Bakersfield	16–15			CIT first round
2012–13	Cal State Bakersfield	14–16			
Cal State Bakersfield Roadrunners (Western Athletic Conference) (2013–2020)
2013–14	Cal State Bakersfield	13–19	5–11	7th	
2014–15	Cal State Bakersfield	14–19	7–7	T–4th	
2015–16	Cal State Bakersfield	24–9	11–3	T–2nd	NCAA Division I first round
2016–17	Cal State Bakersfield	25–10	12–2	1st	NIT semifinal
2017–18	Cal State Bakersfield	12–18	5–9	T–6th	
2018–19	Cal State Bakersfield	18–16	7–9	T–5th	CIT quarterfinal
2019–20	Cal State Bakersfield	12–19	6–10	7th	
Cal State Bakersfield Roadrunners (Big West Conference) (2020–2025)
2020–21	Cal State Bakersfield	15–11	9–7	5th	
2021–22	Cal State Bakersfield	9–19	2–12	T–9th	
2022–23	Cal State Bakersfield	11–22	6–14	8th	
2023–24	Cal State Bakersfield	13–19	8–12	9th	
2024–25	Cal State Bakersfield	14–19	8–12	T–7th	
Cal State Bakersfield:		210–231 (.476)	86–108 (.443)		
Total:		396–420 (.485)			
National champion Postseason invitational champion Conference regular season champion Conference regular season and conference tournament champion Division regular season champion Division regular season and conference tournament champion Conference tournament champion
