= Comcast Hometown Network =

- Country: United States
- Broadcast area: San Francisco Bay Area; Central California

Programming
- Language: American English

Ownership
- Owner: Comcast

Links
- Website: ComcastHometown.com

Comcast Hometown Network (CHN) is an American cable television network owned by the Comcast Corporation that operates in the San Francisco Bay Area of California. It is available to over 2 million homes.
