= Billy Minardi Classic =

The Billy Minardi Classic is an annual college basketball event, founded in 2002, hosted by the University of Louisville. The event is named after Billy Minardi, former Louisville head coach Rick Pitino's brother-in-law. Minardi was killed in the terrorist attacks of September 11, 2001. The event has featured December doubleheader and single games at Freedom Hall and the KFC Yum! Center.
