= 2015–16 Boston College Eagles men's basketball team =

American college basketball season

2015–16 Boston College Eagles men's basketball
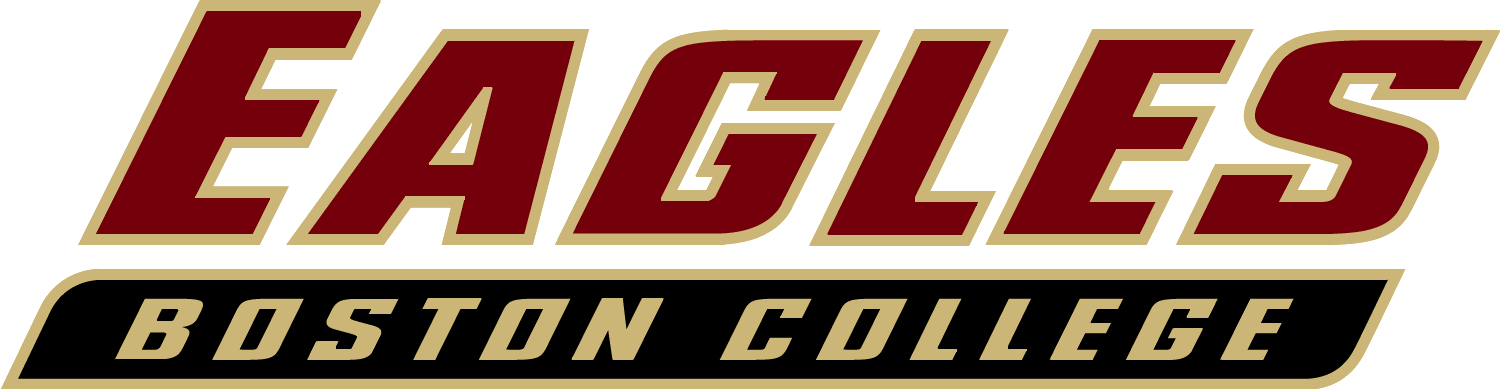
- Conference: Atlantic Coast Conference
- Record: 7–25 (0–18 ACC)
- Head coach: Jim Christian (2nd season)
- Assistant coaches: Scott Spinelli; Bill Wuczynski; Stan Heath
- Home arena: Conte Forum

2015–16 ACC men's basketball standings
	Conf.				Overall
Team	W		L	PCT	W		L	PCT
No. 3 North Carolina †	14	–	4	.778	33	–	7	.825
No. 4 Virginia	13	–	5	.722	29	–	8	.784
No. 10 Miami (FL)	13	–	5	.722	27	–	8	.771
No. 16 Louisville*	12	–	6	.667	23	–	8	.742
Notre Dame	11	–	7	.611	24	–	12	.667
No. 19 Duke	11	–	7	.611	25	–	11	.694
Virginia Tech	10	–	8	.556	20	–	15	.571
Clemson	10	–	8	.556	17	–	14	.548
Pittsburgh	9	–	9	.500	21	–	12	.636
Syracuse	9	–	9	.500	23	–	14	.622
Georgia Tech	8	–	10	.444	21	–	15	.583
Florida State	8	–	10	.444	20	–	14	.588
NC State	5	–	13	.278	16	–	17	.485
Wake Forest	2	–	16	.111	11	–	20	.355
Boston College	0	–	18	.000	7	–	25	.219
† 2016 ACC tournament winner * Ineligible for both the 2016 ACC tournament and the 2016 NCAA tournament due to self-imposed postseason ban. Rankings from AP poll

The 2015–16 Boston College Eagles men's basketball team represented Boston College during the 2015–16 NCAA Division I men's basketball season. The Eagles, led by second year head coach Jim Christian, played their home games at Conte Forum and were members of the Atlantic Coast Conference. The Eagles finished the season with a record of 7–25, 0–18 to finish in last place in ACC play. This was the first time a team went winless in the ACC during a season. They lost to Florida State in the first round of the ACC tournament.

== Previous season ==
The Eagles finished the 2014–15 season with a record of 13–19, 4–14 in ACC play to finish in 13th place. They advanced to the second round of the ACC tournament where they lost to North Carolina.

== Departures ==
Name	Number	Pos.	Height	Weight	Year	Hometown	Notes
Dimitri Batten	1	G	6'3"	205	RS Senior	Newport News, VA	Graduated
Eddie Odio	4	F	6'8"	210	Senior	Miami, FL	Graduated
K. C. Caudill	5	C	6'11"	300	Senior	Brea, CA	Graduate transferred to Nicholls State
Will Magarity	11	F	6'11"	240	Sophomore	Stockholm, Sweden	Transferred to Davidson
John Cain Carney	13	F	6'9"	225	Senior	Philadelphia, PA	Graduated
Sam Donahue	15	G	6'1"	180	Sophomore	Pawacatuck, CT	Walk-on; didn't return
Lonnie Jackson	20	G	6'4"	175	Senior	Valencia, CA	Graduate transferred to Boise State
Olivier Hanlan	21	G	6'4"	190	Junior	Aylmer, QE	Declare for the 2015 NBA draft
Aaron Brown	22	G	6'5"	215	RS Senior	Hackensack, NJ	Graduated
Alex Dragicevich	23	G	6'8"	222	Senior	Northbrook, IL	Graduated
Patrick Heckmann	33	G	6'6"	210	Senior	Mainz, Germany	Graduated

=== Incoming transfers ===
Name	Number	Pos.	Height	Weight	Year	Hometown	Previous School
Eli Carter	3	G	6'2"	200	RS Senior	Paterson, NJ	Transferred from Florida. Will be eligible to play immediately since Carter graduated from Florida.

== Recruiting ==
College recruiting information
Name	Hometown	School	Height	Weight	Commit date
A. J. Turner; SF	Warren, MI	New Hampton School	6 ft 7 in (2.01 m)	185 lb (84 kg)	Sep 13, 2014
A. J. Turner; SF	Recruit ratings: Scout: Rivals: 247Sports: ESPN:				
Matt Milon; SG	Oviedo, FL	Oviedo High School	6 ft 4 in (1.93 m)	180 lb (82 kg)	Sep 7, 2014
Matt Milon; SG	Recruit ratings: Scout: Rivals: 247Sports: ESPN:				
Sammy Barnes-Thompkins; SG	Phoenix, AZ	Sunnyslope High School	6 ft 3 in (1.91 m)	175 lb (79 kg)	May 20, 2015
Sammy Barnes-Thompkins; SG	Recruit ratings: Scout: Rivals: 247Sports: ESPN:				
Jerome Robinson; SG	Raleigh, NC	Needham Broughton High School	6 ft 5 in (1.96 m)	170 lb (77 kg)	Sep 9, 2014
Jerome Robinson; SG	Recruit ratings: Scout: Rivals: 247Sports: ESPN:				
Ervins Meznieks; SF	Latvia	Get Better Academy	6 ft 6 in (1.98 m)	195 lb (88 kg)	
Ervins Meznieks; SF	Recruit ratings: Scout: Rivals: 247Sports: ESPN:				
John Carlos Reyes; SF	LaGrange, GA	Sound Doctrine High School	6 ft 8 in (2.03 m)	215 lb (98 kg)	Jun 18, 2015
John Carlos Reyes; SF	Recruit ratings: Scout: Rivals: 247Sports: ESPN:				
Overall recruit ranking:
Note: In many cases, Scout, Rivals, 247Sports, On3, and ESPN may conflict in their listings of height and weight.; In these cases, the average was taken. ESPN grades are on a 100-point scale.; Sources: "2015 Team Ranking". Rivals.

=== Recruiting Class of 2016 ===
College recruiting information (2016)
Name	Hometown	School	Height	Weight	Commit date
Ty Graves; PG	Greensboro, NC	Page High School	5 ft 11 in (1.80 m)	165 lb (75 kg)	Dec 17, 2014
Ty Graves; PG	Recruit ratings: Scout: Rivals: 247Sports: ESPN:				
Overall recruit ranking:
Note: In many cases, Scout, Rivals, 247Sports, On3, and ESPN may conflict in their listings of height and weight.; In these cases, the average was taken. ESPN grades are on a 100-point scale.; Sources: "2016 Team Ranking". Rivals.

== Roster ==
2015–16 Boston College Eagles men's basketball team
Players
Coaches

Pos.	#	Name	Height	Weight	Year	Hometown
G	1	Jerome Robinson	6 ft 5 in (1.96 m)	181 lb (82 kg)	Fr	Raleigh, NC
G	2	Darryl Hicks	6 ft 2 in (1.88 m)	192 lb (87 kg)	RS So	Louisville, KY
G	3	Eli Carter	6 ft 2 in (1.88 m)	200 lb (91 kg)	RS Sr	Paterson, NJ
F	4	Idy Diallo	6 ft 11 in (2.11 m)	253 lb (115 kg)	RS Fr	Los Angeles, CA
F	5	Garland Owens	6 ft 5 in (1.96 m)	225 lb (102 kg)	Jr	Gaithersburg, MD
F	10	Ervins Meznieks	6 ft 7 in (2.01 m)	218 lb (99 kg)	Fr	Riga, Latvia
F	11	A. J. Turner	6 ft 7 in (2.01 m)	190 lb (86 kg)	Fr	Mount Clemens, MI
F/C	12	Johncarlos Reyes	6 ft 10 in (2.08 m)	216 lb (98 kg)	Fr	Suwanee, GA
G	20	Steve Perpiglia (W)	5 ft 10 in (1.78 m)	165 lb (75 kg)	Sr	Broomall, PA
F	21	Aser Ghebremichael (W)	6 ft 8 in (2.03 m)	195 lb (88 kg)	Fr	Somerville, MA
G	22	Matt Milon	6 ft 4 in (1.93 m)	200 lb (91 kg)	Fr	Oviedo, FL
C	24	Dennis Clifford	7 ft 1 in (2.16 m)	262 lb (119 kg)	RS Sr	Bridgewater, MA
G/F	25	Gordon Gehan (W)	6 ft 5 in (1.96 m)	220 lb (100 kg)	Fr	Dallas, TX
G	55	Sammy Barnes-Thompkins	6 ft 3 in (1.91 m)	192 lb (87 kg)	Fr	Phoenix, AZ

Head coach

- Jim Christian (Rhode Island)

Assistant coach(es)

- Scott Spinelli (Boston University)
- Bill Wuczynski (UNLV)
- Stan Heath (Eastern Michigan)

Legend

- (C) Team captain
- (S) Suspended
- (I) Ineligible
- (W) Walk-on
- Injured
- Current redshirt

Roster

== Schedule and results ==
Date time, TV	Opponent	Result	Record	Site (attendance) city, state
Exhibition
Nov 5, 2015*; 6:00 pm	Bentley	W 85–75		Conte Forum; Chestnut Hill, MA
Non-conference regular season
Nov 14, 2015*; 2:00 pm, ESPN3	St. Francis Brooklyn	W 75–49	1–0	Conte Forum (3,074); Chestnut Hill, MA
Nov 19, 2015*; 6:00 pm, ESPN3	Central Connecticut	W 82–57	2–0	Conte Forum (1,853); Chestnut Hill, MA
Nov 22, 2015*; 12:30 pm, ESPNU	Harvard; Rivalry	W 69–56	3–0	Conte Forum (2,765); Chestnut Hill, MA
Nov 26, 2015*; 6:30 pm, ESPN2	vs. No. 3 Michigan State; The Wooden Legacy quarterfinals	L 68–99	3–1	Titan Gym (2,341); Fullerton, CA
Nov 27, 2015*; 2:30 pm, ESPN3	vs. UC Irvine; The Wooden Legacy consolation round	L 67–80	3–2	Titan Gym (3,173); Fullerton, CA
Nov 29, 2015*; 7:30 pm	vs. Santa Clara; The Wooden Legacy 7th place game	L 45–62	3–3	Honda Center (4,393); Anaheim, CA
Dec 2, 2015*; 7:15 pm, ESPNU	Penn State; ACC–Big Ten Challenge	L 58–67	3–4	Conte Forum (2,165); Chestnut Hill, MA
Dec 6, 2015*; 2:00 pm, ESPN3	UMass Lowell	L 66–68	3–5	Conte Forum (1,327); Chestnut Hill, MA
Dec 9, 2015*; 7:00 pm, FS1	at No. 15 Providence	L 51–66	3–6	Dunkin' Donuts Center (8,425); Providence, RI
Dec 13, 2015*; 5:00 pm, ESPN3	Maine	W 91–60	4–6	Conte Forum (1,411); Chestnut Hill, MA
Dec 19, 2015*; 7:00 pm, ESPN3	Delaware	W 69–61	5–6	Conte Forum (1,670); Chestnut Hill, MA
Dec 22, 2015*; 3:30 pm	vs. Fordham; Atlantic 10/ACC Showcase	W 64–55	6–6	Barclays Center; Brooklyn, NY
Dec 30, 2015*; 2:00 pm, ESPN3	New Hampshire	W 72–67 ^{OT}	7–6	Conte Forum (3,274); Chestnut Hill, MA
ACC regular season
Jan 2, 2016; 4:30 pm, RSN	No. 15 Duke	L 64–81	7–7 (0–1)	Conte Forum (7,963); Chestnut Hill, MA
Jan 7, 2016; 7:00 pm, RSN	Notre Dame	L 54–82	7–8 (0–2)	Conte Forum (4,165); Chestnut Hill, MA
Jan 13, 2016; 7:00 pm, RSN	at Syracuse	L 40–62	7–9 (0–3)	Carrier Dome (16,701); Syracuse, NY
Jan 16, 2016; 2:00 pm, RSN	at No. 20 Pittsburgh	L 61–84	7–10 (0–4)	Peterson Events Center (10,260); Pittsburgh, PA
Jan 20, 2016; 9:00 pm, RSN	No. 15 Miami (FL)	L 53–67	7–11 (0–5)	Conte Forum (3,286); Chestnut Hill, MA
Jan 23, 2016; 12:00 pm, ACCN	at Notre Dame	L 49–76	7–12 (0–6)	Edmund P. Joyce Center (9,149); South Bend, IN
Jan 26, 2016; 7:00 pm, ESPNU	Florida State	L 62–72	7–13 (0–7)	Conte Forum (2,074); Chestnut Hill, MA
Jan 30, 2016; 4:00 pm, ESPN2	at No. 2 North Carolina	L 62–89	7–14 (0–8)	Dean Smith Center (20,208); Chapel Hill, NC
Feb 3, 2016; 7:00 pm, RSN	at No. 9 Virginia	L 47–61	7–15 (0–9)	John Paul Jones Arena (14,310); Charlottesville, VA
Feb 6, 2016; 12:00 pm, ACCN	at No. 19 Louisville	L 47–79	7–16 (0–10)	KFC Yum! Center (21,803); Louisville, KY
Feb 9, 2016; 8:00 pm, ACCN	No. 9 North Carolina	L 65–68	7–17 (0–11)	Conte Forum (5,126); Chestnut Hill, MA
Feb 14, 2016; 1:00 pm, ACCN	Syracuse	L 61–75	7–18 (0–12)	Conte Forum (8,606); Chestnut Hill, MA
Feb 17, 2016; 7:00 pm, RSN	at Clemson	L 54–65	7–19 (0–13)	Bon Secours Wellness Arena (8,101); Greenville, SC
Feb 21, 2016; 6:30 pm, ESPNU	at Wake Forest	L 48–74	7–20 (0–14)	LJVM Coliseum (8,542); Winston-Salem, NC
Feb 23, 2016; 9:00 pm, ESPNU	Virginia Tech	L 56–71	7–21 (0–15)	Conte Forum (1,018); Chestnut Hill, MA
Feb 27, 2016; 12:00 pm, RSN	Georgia Tech	L 71–76	7–22 (0–16)	Conte Forum (4,148); Chestnut Hill, MA
Mar 2, 2016; 9:00 pm, RSN	at NC State	L 72–73	7–23 (0–17)	PNC Arena (15,152); Raleigh, NC
Mar 5, 2016; 12:00 pm, RSN	Clemson	L 50–66	7–24 (0–18)	Conte Forum (4,073); Chestnut Hill, MA
ACC tournament
03/08/2016; 2:00 pm, ESPN2	vs. Florida State; First round	L 66–88	7–25	Verizon Center (7,302); Washington, D.C.
*Non-conference game. ^{#}Rankings from AP Poll. (#) Tournament seedings in parentheses. All times are in Eastern Time.

== See also ==
2015–16 Boston College Eagles women's basketball team
