= 2015–16 Clemson Tigers men's basketball team =

American college basketball season

2015–16 Clemson Tigers men's basketball
- Conference: Atlantic Coast Conference
- Record: 17–14 (10–8 ACC)
- Head coach: Brad Brownell (6th season)
- Assistant coaches: Mike Winiecki; Richie Riley; Steve Smith
- Home arena: Bon Secours Wellness Arena

2015–16 ACC men's basketball standings
	Conf.				Overall
Team	W		L	PCT	W		L	PCT
No. 3 North Carolina †	14	–	4	.778	33	–	7	.825
No. 4 Virginia	13	–	5	.722	29	–	8	.784
No. 10 Miami (FL)	13	–	5	.722	27	–	8	.771
No. 16 Louisville*	12	–	6	.667	23	–	8	.742
Notre Dame	11	–	7	.611	24	–	12	.667
No. 19 Duke	11	–	7	.611	25	–	11	.694
Virginia Tech	10	–	8	.556	20	–	15	.571
Clemson	10	–	8	.556	17	–	14	.548
Pittsburgh	9	–	9	.500	21	–	12	.636
Syracuse	9	–	9	.500	23	–	14	.622
Georgia Tech	8	–	10	.444	21	–	15	.583
Florida State	8	–	10	.444	20	–	14	.588
NC State	5	–	13	.278	16	–	17	.485
Wake Forest	2	–	16	.111	11	–	20	.355
Boston College	0	–	18	.000	7	–	25	.219
† 2016 ACC tournament winner * Ineligible for both the 2016 ACC tournament and the 2016 NCAA tournament due to self-imposed postseason ban. Rankings from AP poll

The 2015–16 Clemson Tigers men's basketball team represented Clemson University during the 2015–16 NCAA Division I men's basketball season. Led by sixth year head coach Brad Brownell, the Tigers played their home games at Bon Secours Wellness Arena, due to renovations at Littlejohn Coliseum, as members of the Atlantic Coast Conference. They finished the season 17–14, 10–8 in ACC play to finish in a tie for seventh place.

They lost in the second round of the ACC tournament to Georgia Tech.

== Last season ==
The Tigers finished the season 16–15, 8–10 in ACC play to finish in a three-way tie for sixth place. They lost in the second round of the ACC tournament to Florida State.

== Departures ==
Name	Number	Pos.	Height	Weight	Year	Hometown	Notes
Carson Fields	2	G	6'4"	200	Senior	Pewee Valley, KY	Graduated
Patrick Rooks	4	G	6'2"	190	RS Freshman	Charlotte, NC	Transferred to Chipola College
Rod Hall	12	G	6'1"	205	Senior	Augusta, GA	Graduated
Damacus Harrison	21	G	6'4"	205	RS Senior	Greenwood, SC	Graduated

=== Incoming transfers ===
Name	Number	Pos.	Height	Weight	Year	Hometown	Previous School
Legend Robertin	00	C	7'0"	220	Sophomore	London, England	Junior college transferred from Chipola College
Marcquise Reed	2	G	6'3"	180	Sophomore	Landover, MD	Transferred from Robert Morris. Under NCAA transfer rules, Reed will have to sit out for the 2015–16 season. Will have three years of remaining eligibility.
Shelton Mitchell	4	G	6'3"	186	Sophomore	Waxhaw, NC	Transferred from Vanderbilt. Under NCAA transfer rules, Mitchell will have to sit out for the 2015–16 season. Will have three years of remaining eligibility.

== Recruiting class ==
College recruiting information
Name	Hometown	School	Height	Weight	Commit date
Ty Hudson; PG	Sandy Springs, GA	Pebblebrook High School	6 ft 1 in (1.85 m)	185 lb (84 kg)	Sep 27, 2014
Ty Hudson; PG	Recruit ratings: Scout: Rivals: 247Sports: ESPN:				
Overall recruit ranking: Scout: NA Rivals: NAoh ESPN: NA
Note: In many cases, Scout, Rivals, 247Sports, On3, and ESPN may conflict in their listings of height and weight.; In these cases, the average was taken. ESPN grades are on a 100-point scale.; Sources: "ESPN". ESPN.; "2015 Team Ranking". Rivals.

== Roster ==
2015–16 Clemson Tigers men's basketball team
Players
Coaches

Pos.	#	Name	Height	Weight	Year	Hometown
C	00	Legend Robertin	7 ft 0 in (2.13 m)	250 lb (113 kg)	So	London, England
F	1	Austin Ajukwa	6 ft 6 in (1.98 m)	205 lb (93 kg)	Jr	Columbia, South Carolina
G	2	Marcquise Reed (I) (redshirt)	6 ft 4 in (1.93 m)	180 lb (82 kg)	So	Landover, Maryland
G	4	Shelton Mitchell (I) (redshirt)	6 ft 2 in (1.88 m)	180 lb (82 kg)	So	Waxhaw, North Carolina
F	5	Jaron Blossomgame	6 ft 7 in (2.01 m)	220 lb (100 kg)	RS Jr	Alpharetta, Georgia
G	10	Gabe DeVoe	6 ft 3 in (1.91 m)	205 lb (93 kg)	So	Shelby, North Carolina
G	11	Ty Hudson	6 ft 1 in (1.85 m)	205 lb (93 kg)	Fr	Sandy Springs, Georgia
G	12	Avry Holmes (W)	6 ft 2 in (1.88 m)	205 lb (93 kg)	RS Jr	Salem, Oregon
F	15	Donte Grantham	6 ft 8 in (2.03 m)	210 lb (95 kg)	So	Martinsburg, West Virginia
G	20	Jordan Roper	6 ft 0 in (1.83 m)	165 lb (75 kg)	Sr	Columbia, South Carolina
F	33	Josh Smith	6 ft 8 in (2.03 m)	245 lb (111 kg)	Sr	Charlotte, North Carolina
C	35	Landry Nnoko	6 ft 10 in (2.08 m)	255 lb (116 kg)	Sr	Yaoundé, Cameroon
G	44	Riley McGillan (W)	6 ft 0 in (1.83 m)	175 lb (79 kg)	Sr	Fort Mill, South Carolina
C	50	Sidy Djitte	6 ft 10 in (2.08 m)	240 lb (109 kg)	Jr	Dakar, Senegal

Head coach

- Brad Brownell

Assistant coach(es)

- Mike Winiecki
- Richie Riley
- Steve Smith

Legend

- (C) Team captain
- (S) Suspended
- (I) Ineligible
- (W) Walk-on
- Injured
- Current redshirt

Roster

== Schedule ==
Date time, TV	Rank^{#}	Opponent^{#}	Result	Record	High points	High rebounds	High assists	Site (attendance) city, state
Exhibition
Nov 5, 2015*; 7:00 pm		Lenoir–Rhyne	W 87–84 ^{2OT}	–	27 – Grantham	15 – Nnoko	4 – Holmes	Bon Secours Wellness Arena; Greenville, SC
Non-conference regular season
Nov 13, 2015*; 7:00 pm, ESPN3		North Carolina Central	W 74–40	1–0	18 – Blossomgame	9 – Nnoko	4 – Tied	Bon Secours Wellness Arena (5,742); Greenville, SC
Nov 15, 2015*; 2:00 pm, ESPN3		UTSA	W 78–45	2–0	22 – Grantham	10 – Djitte	7 – Roper	Bon Secours Wellness Arena (6,262); Greenville, SC
Nov 19, 2015*; 7:00 pm, ESPN3		Texas Southern	W 76–56	3–0	23 – Riley	11 – Djitte	5 – Tied	Bon Secours Wellness Arena (6,185); Greenville, SC
Nov 23, 2015*; 9:30 pm, YouTube		vs. Massachusetts; Men Who Speak Up Main Event; Semifinals	L 65–82	31	18 – Tied	10 – DeVoe	1 – Tied	MGM Grand Garden Arena (1,000); Paradise, NV
Nov 25, 2015*; 9:00 pm, ESPN2		vs. Rutgers; Men Who Speak Up Main Event; Heavyweight	W 76–58	4–1	22 – Tied	9 – Blossomgame	4 – Roper	MGM Grand Garden Arena (1,623); Paradise, NV
Nov 30, 2015*; 9:00 pm, ESPN2		at Minnesota; ACC–Big Ten Challenge	L 83–89	4–2	25 – Roper	10 – Murphy	8 – Mason	Williams Arena (10,229); Minneapolis, MN
Dec 2, 2015*; 7:00 pm, ESPN3		USC Upstate	W 76–56	5–2	20 – Holmes	8 – Nnoko	6 – Holmes	Bon Secours Wellness Arena (5,528); Greenville, SC
Dec 6, 2015*; 2:00 pm, ESPN3		Wofford	W 66–51	6–2	22 – Blossomgame	10 – Blossomgame	5 – Collins	Bon Secours Wellness Arena (4,945); Greenville, SC
Dec 13, 2015*; 6:00 pm, ESPNU		Alabama	L 50–51	6–3	15 – Nnoko	7 – Blossomgame	5 – Roper	Bon Secours Wellness Arena (7,412); Greenville, SC
Dec 15, 2015*; 7:00 pm, ESPN3		Presbyterian	W 61–49	7–3	12 – Tied	13 – Djitte	5 – Holmes	Bon Secours Wellness Arena (5,478); Greenville, SC
Dec 18, 2015*; 7:00 pm, ESPN3		South Carolina; Rivalry	L 59–65	7–4	17 – Blossomgame	11 – Blossomgame	5 – Roper	Bon Secours Wellness Arena (14,446); Greenville, SC
Dec 22, 2015*; 6:00 pm, SECN		at Georgia	L 48–71	7–5	11 – Nnoko	6 – Nnoko	3 – Grantham	Stegeman Coliseum (10,523); Athens, GA
ACC regular season
Dec 30, 2015; 7:00 pm, ESPN2		at No. 7 North Carolina	L 68–80	7–6 (0–1)	15 – Blossomgame	6 – Blossomgame	4 – Blossomgame	Dean Smith Center (17,168); Chapel Hill, NC
Jan 2, 2016; 12:00 pm, RSN		Florida State	W 84–75	8–6 (1–1)	23 – Roper	9 – Blossomgame	7 – Grantham	Bon Secours Wellness Arena (9,945); Greenville, SC
Jan 5, 2016; 8:00 pm, ACCN		at Syracuse	W 74–73 ^{OT}	9–6 (2–1)	20 – Blossomgame	10 – Nnoko	10 – Roper	Carrier Dome (16,305); Syracuse, NY
Jan 10, 2016; 12:00 pm, RSN		No. 16 Louisville	W 66–62	10–6 (3–1)	17 – Blossomgame	9 – Blossomgame	4 – Roper	Bon Secours Wellness Arena (9,562); Greenville, SC
Jan 13, 2016; 7:00 pm, ESPN2		No. 9 Duke	W 68–63	11–6 (4–1)	17 – Blossomgame	13 – Nnoko	9 – Roper	Bon Secours Wellness Arena (12,972); Greenville, SC
Jan 16, 2016; 2:00 pm, ACCN		No. 8 Miami (FL)	W 76–65	12–6 (5–1)	25 – Blossomgame	7 – Blossomgame	6 – Roper	Bon Secours Wellness Arena (12,575); Greenville, SC
Jan 19, 2016; 8:00 pm, ESPN3		at No. 13 Virginia	L 62–69	12–7 (5–2)	23 – Blossomgame	6 – Blossomgame	3 – Roper	John Paul Jones Arena (14,398); Charlottesville, VA
Jan 27, 2016; 7:00 pm, RSN		No. 23 Pittsburgh	W 73–60	13–7 (6–2)	22 – Blossomgame	9 – Djitte	5 – Grantham	Bon Secours Wellness Arena (8,752); Greenville, SC
Jan 30, 2016; 12:00 pm, RSN		at Florida State	L 65–76	13–8 (6–3)	22 – Blossomgame	7 – Tied	3 – Roper	Donald L. Tucker Civic Center (8,166); Tallahassee, FL
Feb 2, 2016; 8:00 pm, ACCN		at Wake Forest	W 76–62	14–8 (7–3)	22 – Blossomgame	12 – Blossomgame	3 – Blossomgame	LJVM Coliseum (8,716); Winston-Salem, NC
Feb 6, 2016; 4:00 pm, RSN		at Virginia Tech	L 57–60	14–9 (7–4)	17 – Nnoko	12 – Nnoko	3 – Holmes	Cassell Coliseum (9,567); Blacksburg, VA
Feb 8, 2016; 9:00 pm, ESPNU		Notre Dame	L 83–89	14–10 (7–5)	30 – Blossomgame	7 – Grantham	6 – Roper	Bon Secours Wellness Arena (8,195); Greenville, SC
Feb 13, 2016; 2:00 pm, RSN		Georgia Tech	W 66-52	15–10 (8–5)	17 – Blossomgame	7 – Tied	1 – Tied	Bon Secours Wellness Arena (12,232); Greenville, SC
Feb 17, 2016; 7:00 pm, RSN		Boston College	W 65–54	16–10 (9–5)	23 – Blossomgame	8 – Tied	5 – Holmes	Bon Secours Wellness Arena (8,101); Greenville, SC
Feb 20, 2016; 3:00 pm, ACCN		at NC State	L 74–77	16–11 (9–6)	33 – Blossomgame	8 – Djitte	7 – Grantham	PNC Arena (17,536); Raleigh, NC
Feb 23, 2016; 7:00 pm, RSN		at Georgia Tech	L 73–75	16–12 (9–7)	22 – Blossomgame	6 – Nnoko	6 – Roper	Hank McCamish Pavilion (5,531); Atlanta, GA
Mar 1, 2016; 7:00 pm, ESPNU		No. 4 Virginia	L 57–64	16–13 (9–8)	31 – Blossomgame	6 – Nnoko	6 – DeVoe	Bon Secours Wellness Arena (9,626); Greenville, SC
Mar 5, 2016; 12:00 pm, RSN		at Boston College	W 66–50	17–13 (10–8)	16 – Blossomgame	8 – Grantham	9 – Roper	Conte Forum (4,073); Chestnut Hill, MA
ACC tournament
Mar 8–12, 2016; 7:00 pm, ESPN2	(7)	vs. (10) Georgia Tech; Second round	L 85–88 ^{OT}	17–14	22 – Blossomgame	7 – Djitte	4 – Holmes	Verizon Center (18,561); Washington, D.C.
*Non-conference game. ^{#}Rankings from AP Poll. (#) Tournament seedings in parentheses. All times are in Eastern Time.
