= 2015–16 Miami Hurricanes men's basketball team =

American college basketball season

2015–16 Miami Hurricanes men's basketball

Puerto Rico Tip-Off champions

NCAA tournament, Sweet Sixteen
- Conference: Atlantic Coast Conference

Ranking
- Coaches: No. 8
- AP: No. 10
- Record: 27–8 (13–5 ACC)
- Head coach: Jim Larrañaga (5th season)
- Assistant coaches: Chris Caputo; Jamal Brunt; Adam Fisher
- Home arena: BankUnited Center

2015–16 ACC men's basketball standings
	Conf.				Overall
Team	W		L	PCT	W		L	PCT
No. 3 North Carolina †	14	–	4	.778	33	–	7	.825
No. 4 Virginia	13	–	5	.722	29	–	8	.784
No. 10 Miami (FL)	13	–	5	.722	27	–	8	.771
No. 16 Louisville*	12	–	6	.667	23	–	8	.742
Notre Dame	11	–	7	.611	24	–	12	.667
No. 19 Duke	11	–	7	.611	25	–	11	.694
Virginia Tech	10	–	8	.556	20	–	15	.571
Clemson	10	–	8	.556	17	–	14	.548
Pittsburgh	9	–	9	.500	21	–	12	.636
Syracuse	9	–	9	.500	23	–	14	.622
Georgia Tech	8	–	10	.444	21	–	15	.583
Florida State	8	–	10	.444	20	–	14	.588
NC State	5	–	13	.278	16	–	17	.485
Wake Forest	2	–	16	.111	11	–	20	.355
Boston College	0	–	18	.000	7	–	25	.219
† 2016 ACC tournament winner * Ineligible for both the 2016 ACC tournament and the 2016 NCAA tournament due to self-imposed postseason ban. Rankings from AP poll

The 2015–16 Miami Hurricanes men's basketball team represented the University of Miami during the 2015–16 NCAA Division I men's basketball season. The Hurricanes were members of the Atlantic Coast Conference (ACC). They were led by fifthyear head coach Jim Larrañaga and played their home games at the BankUnited Center on the university's campus in Coral Gables, Florida. They finished the season 27–8, 13–5 in ACC play to finish in a tie for second place. They defeated Virginia Tech in the quarterfinals of the ACC tournament to advance to the semifinals, where they lost to Virginia. They received an at-large bid to the NCAA tournament, where they defeated Buffalo and Wichita State to advance to the Sweet Sixteen, where they lost to eventual national champion Villanova.

== Previous season ==
The Hurricanes finished the season 25–13, 10–8 in ACC play to finish to finish in a tie for sixth place. They advanced to the quarterfinals of the ACC tournament, where they lost to Notre Dame. They were invited to the National Invitation Tournament, where they defeated North Carolina Central, Alabama, Richmond and Clemson to advance to the NIT championship game, where they lost to Stanford.

=== Departures ===
Departures
Name	Number	Pos.	Height	Weight	Year	Hometown	Reason for departure
Deandre Burnett	1	G	6'2"	191	RS freshman	Miami Gardens, FL	Transferred to Ole Miss
Joe Thomas	2	F	6'7"	235	RS senior	Miami, FL	Graduated
Mike Fernandez	11	G	6'1"	189	Sophomore	Coral Gables, FL	Walk on; didn't return
Manu Lecomte	20	G	5'9"	159	Sophomore	Brussels, Belgium	Transferred to Baylor
Omar Sherman	22	F	6'8"	220	Freshman	Duncanville, TX	Transferred to Louisiana Tech

=== Incoming transfers ===
Incoming transfers
Name	Number	Pos.	Height	Weight	Year	Hometown	Previous school
Rashad Muhammad	1	G	6'6"	170	Junior	Las Vegas, NV	San Jose State

== 2015 recruiting class ==
College recruiting
Name	Hometown	School	Height	Weight	Commit date
Anthony Lawrence II; F	St. Petersburg, FL	Lakewood High School	6 ft 7 in (2.01 m)	185 lb (84 kg)	Mar 24, 2014
Anthony Lawrence II; F	Recruit ratings: Scout: Rivals: 247Sports: ESPN:				
Ebuka Izundu; F	Charlotte, NC	Victory Christian High School	6 ft 10 in (2.08 m)	210 lb (95 kg)	May 13, 2015
Ebuka Izundu; F	Recruit ratings: Scout: Rivals: 247Sports: ESPN:				
Overall recruit ranking:
Note: In many cases, Scout, Rivals, 247Sports, On3, and ESPN may conflict in their listings of height and weight.; In these cases, the average was taken. ESPN grades are on a 100-point scale.; Sources: "2015 Team Ranking". Rivals.

== Roster ==
2015–16 Miami Hurricanes men's basketball team
Players
Coaches

Pos.	#	Name	Height	Weight	Year	Hometown
G	0	Ja'Quan Newton	6 ft 2 in (1.88 m)	180 lb (82 kg)	So	Philadelphia, PA
G	1	Rashad Muhammad (I) (redshirt)	6 ft 6 in (1.98 m)	160 lb (73 kg)	Jr	Las Vegas, NV
F	3	Anthony Lawrence II	6 ft 7 in (2.01 m)	210 lb (95 kg)	Fr	St. Petersburg, FL
G	5	Davon Reed	6 ft 6 in (1.98 m)	210 lb (95 kg)	Jr	Ewing, NJ
G	10	Sheldon McClellan	6 ft 5 in (1.96 m)	200 lb (91 kg)	RS Sr	Houston, TX
G	12	James Palmer Jr.	6 ft 5 in (1.96 m)	202 lb (92 kg)	So	Washington, D.C.
G	13	Angel Rodríguez	5 ft 11 in (1.8 m)	185 lb (84 kg)	RS Sr	Cupey, Puerto Rico
F	15	Ebuka Izundu	6 ft 10 in (2.08 m)	210 lb (95 kg)	Fr	Charlotte, NC
G	20	Mike Robinson (W)	5 ft 10 in (1.78 m)	170 lb (77 kg)	Fr	New Britain, CT
F	21	Kamari Murphy	6 ft 8 in (2.03 m)	220 lb (100 kg)	RS Jr	Brooklyn, NY
C	23	Tonye Jekiri	7 ft 0 in (2.13 m)	248 lb (112 kg)	Sr	Hialeah, FL
F	33	Ivan Uceda	6 ft 10 in (2.08 m)	217 lb (98 kg)	Sr	Madrid, Spain
F	35	Chris Stowell (W)	6 ft 6 in (1.98 m)	190 lb (86 kg)	So	Exeter, NH

Head coach

- Jim Larrañaga (Providence)

Assistant coach(es)

- Chris Caputo (Westfield State)
- Jamal Brunt (Randolph–Macon)
- Adam Fisher (Penn State)

Legend

- (C) Team captain
- (S) Suspended
- (I) Ineligible
- (W) Walk-on
- Injured
- Current redshirt

Roster

== Schedule and results ==
Date time, TV	Rank^{#}	Opponent^{#}	Result	Record	High points	High rebounds	High assists	Site (attendance) city, state
Exhibition
Nov 4, 2015*; 7:00 pm		Dowling	W 91–40		18 – McClellan	11 – Murphy	3 – Tied	BankUnited Center (5,426); Coral Gables, FL
Non-conference regular season
Nov 13, 2015*; 7:00 pm, ESPN3		Texas–Rio Grande Valley	W 86–59	1–0	18 – McClellan	12 – Jekiri	7 – Rodríguez	BankUnited Center (6,607); Coral Gables, FL
Nov 16, 2015*; 7:00 pm, RSN		Louisiana–Lafayette	W 93–77	2–0	19 – Reed	6 – Lawrence II	5 – Newton	BankUnited Center (5,965); Coral Gables, FL
Nov 19, 2015*; 5:00 pm, ESPN2		vs. Mississippi State; Puerto Rico Tip-Off First Round	W 105–79	3–0	18 – McClellan	10 – Jekiri	5 – Tied	Roberto Clemente Coliseum (1,947); San Juan, PR
Nov 20, 2015*; 5:00 pm, ESPNU		vs. No. 16 Utah; Puerto Rico Tip-Off Semifinals	W 90–66	4–0	27 – McClellan	12 – Jekiri	4 – Rodríguez	Roberto Clemente Coliseum (2,001); San Juan, PR
Nov 22, 2015*; 7:30 pm, ESPN2		vs. No. 22 Butler; Puerto Rico Tip-Off Championship	W 85–75	5–0	19 – Rodríguez	12 – Jekiri	3 – Tied	Roberto Clemente Coliseum (5,309); San Juan, PR
Nov 27, 2015*; 4:00 pm, ESPN3	No. 15	Northeastern	L 77–78	5–1	19 – Reed	12 – Jekiri	6 – Rodríguez	BankUnited Center (6,635); Coral Gables, FL
Dec 1, 2015*; 9:00 pm, ESPNU	No. 21	at Nebraska; Big Ten-ACC Challenge	W 77–72 ^{OT}	6–1	15 – Rodríguez	10 – Jekiri	4 – Rodríguez	Pinnacle Bank Arena (15,646); Lincoln, NE
Dec 5, 2015*; 4:00 pm, ESPN3	No. 21	Charlotte	W 88–60	7–1	14 – Newton	10 – Jekiri	6 – Newton	BankUnited Center (6,735); Coral Gables, FL
Dec 8, 2015*; 7:00 pm, ESPN2	No. 17	Florida	W 66–55	8–1	24 – McClellan	9 – Jekiri	3 – Newton	BankUnited Center (7,972); Coral Gables, FL
Dec 19, 2015*; 4:00 pm, RSN	No. 15	College of Charleston	W 85–63	9–1	20 – Newton	8 – Jekiri	5 – Rodríguez	BankUnited Center (6,956); Coral Gables, FL
Dec 22, 2015*; 5:00 pm, CBSSN	No. 13	vs. La Salle	W 95–49	10–1	20 – Uceda	14 – Jekiri	6 – McClellan	The Palestra (3,582); Philadelphia, PA
Dec 29, 2015*; 7:00 pm, ESPN3	No. 13	Princeton	W 76–64	11–1	14 – Rodríguez	9 – Reed	6 – Rodríguez	BankUnited Center (6,927); Coral Gables, FL
ACC regular season
Jan 2, 2016; 2:30 pm, ACCN	No. 13	Syracuse	W 64–51	12–1 (1–0)	24 – McClellan	8 – Murphy	4 – Rodríguez	BankUnited Center (7,972); Coral Gables, FL
Jan 9, 2016; 5:00 pm, ESPN2	No. 12	Florida State	W 72–59	13–1 (2–0)	21 – McClellan	10 – Jekiri	4 – Newton	BankUnited Center (7,972); Coral Gables, FL
Jan 12, 2016; 7:00 pm, ESPNU	No. 8	at No. 13 Virginia	L 58–66	13–2 (2–1)	17 – Rodríguez	6 – Jekiri	3 – Tied	John Paul Jones Arena (13,495); Charlottesville, VA
Jan 16, 2016; 2:00 pm, ACCN	No. 8	at Clemson	L 65–76	13–3 (2–2)	17 – Reed	11 – Jekiri	3 – Rodríguez	Bon Secours Wellness Arena (12,575); Greenville, SC
Jan 20, 2016; 9:00 pm, RSN	No. 15	at Boston College	W 67–53	14–3 (3–2)	19 – McClellan	17 – Jekiri	4 – Rodríguez	Conte Forum (3,286); Chestnut Hill, MA
Jan 23, 2016; 12:00 pm, ACCN	No. 15	Wake Forest	W 77–63	15–3 (4–2)	18 – Newton	12 – Jekiri	5 – McClellan	BankUnited Center (6,928); Coral Gables, FL
Jan 25, 2016; 7:00 pm, ESPN	No. 15	No. 24 Duke	W 80–69	16–3 (5–2)	21 – McClellan	10 – Jekiri	11 – Rodríguez	BankUnited Center (7,972); Coral Gables, FL
Jan 30, 2016; 3:30 pm, ACCN	No. 15	at NC State	L 69–85	16–4 (5–3)	18 – McClellan	5 – Jekiri	6 – Rodríguez	PNC Arena (18,103); Raleigh, NC
Feb 3, 2016; 7:00 pm, ESPN2	No. 17	Notre Dame	W 79–70	17–4 (6–3)	18 – Lawrence Jr.	12 – Jekiri	5 – Rodríguez	BankUnited Center (6,819); Coral Gables, FL
Feb 7, 2016; 1:00 pm, ESPNU	No. 17	at Georgia Tech	W 75–68	18–4 (7–3)	22 – McClellan	17 – Jekiri	6 – Rodríguez	McCamish Pavilion (5,569); Atlanta, GA
Feb 9, 2016; 7:00 pm, ESPNU	No. 12	Pittsburgh	W 65–63	19–4 (8–3)	17 – Rodríguez	10 – Jekiri	8 – Rodríguez	BankUnited Center (6,609); Coral Gables, FL
Feb 14, 2016; 6:30 pm, ESPNU	No. 12	at Florida State	W 67–65	20–4 (9–3)	20 – McClellan	9 – Tied	6 – Rodríguez	Donald L. Tucker Civic Center (9,492); Tallahassee, FL
Feb 17, 2016; 9:00 pm, RSN	No. 11	Virginia Tech	W 65–49	21–4 (10–3)	14 – Rodríguez	10 – Murphy	4 – Rodríguez	BankUnited Center (6,614); Coral Gables, FL
Feb 20, 2016; 1:00 pm, CBS	No. 11	at No. 5 North Carolina	L 71–96	21–5 (10–4)	12 – Tied	5 – Tied	3 – Rodríguez	Dean Smith Center (20,151); Chapel Hill, NC
Feb 22, 2016; 7:00 pm, ESPN	No. 12	No. 3 Virginia	W 64–61	22–5 (11–4)	21 – Reed	11 – Murphy	5 – Jekiri	BankUnited Center (7,016); Coral Gables, FL
Feb 27, 2016; 2:00 pm, ACCN	No. 12	No. 11 Louisville	W 73–65	23–5 (12–4)	17 – Tied	8 – Jekiri	7 – Rodríguez	BankUnited Center (7,342); Coral Gables, FL
Mar 2, 2016; 7:00 pm, ESPN2	No. 7	at Notre Dame	W 68–50	24–5 (13–4)	19 – Rodríguez	9 – Jekiri	5 – Rodríguez	Joyce Center (9,149); Notre Dame, IN
Mar 5, 2016; 4:00 pm, ACCN	No. 7	at Virginia Tech	L 62–77	24–6 (13–5)	19 – Reed	6 – Tied	3 – Tied	Cassell Coliseum (8,911); Blacksburg, VA
ACC tournament
Mar 10, 2016; 9:00 pm, ESPN	(3) No. 11	vs. (6) Virginia Tech; Quarterfinals	W 88–82	25–6	21 – McClellan	5 – Tied	9 – Rodríguez	Verizon Center (20,719); Washington D.C.
Mar 11, 2016; 9:00 pm, ESPN	(3) No. 11	vs. (2) No. 4 Virginia; Semifinals	L 68–73	25–7	19 – Newton	7 – Jekiri	3 – Tied	Verizon Center (20,719); Washington D.C.
NCAA tournament
Mar 17, 2016*; 6:50 pm, TNT	(3 S) No. 10	vs. (14 S) Buffalo; First Round	W 79–72	26–7	24 – Rodríguez	12 – Reed	4 – Rodríguez	Dunkin' Donuts Center (11,559); Providence, RI
Mar 19, 2016*; 12:10 pm, CBS	(3 S) No. 10	vs. (11 S) Wichita State; Second Round	W 65–57	27–7	28 – Rodríguez	7 – Tied	5 – Rodríguez	Dunkin' Donuts Center (11,679); Providence, RI
Mar 24, 2016*; 7:10 pm, CBS	(3 S) No. 10	vs. (2 S) No. 6 Villanova; Sweet Sixteen	L 69–92	27–8	26 – McClellan	4 – Jekiri	8 – Rodríguez	KFC Yum! Center (19,399); Louisville, KY
*Non-conference game. ^{#}Rankings from AP Poll. (#) Tournament seedings in parentheses. S=South Region. All times are in Eastern Time.

== Rankings ==
Ranking movement Legend: ██ Increase in ranking. ██ Decrease in ranking. ██ Not ranked the previous week. RV=Others receiving votes.
Poll	Pre	Wk 2	Wk 3	Wk 4	Wk 5	Wk 6	Wk 7	Wk 8	Wk 9	Wk 10	Wk 11	Wk 12	Wk 13	Wk 14	Wk 15	Wk 16	Wk 17	Wk 18	Post	Final
AP	RV	RV	15	21	17	15	13	13	12	8	15	15	17	12	11	12	7	11	10	N/A
Coaches	RV	RV	19	21	20	19	16	15	11	9	14	13	15	11	10	11	7	11	11	8
