= 2015–16 NC State Wolfpack men's basketball team =

American college basketball season

2015–16 NC State Wolfpack men's basketball
- Conference: Atlantic Coast Conference
- Record: 16–17 (5–13 ACC)
- Head coach: Mark Gottfried (5th season)
- Assistant coaches: Orlando Early; Bobby Lutz; Rob Moxley
- Home arena: PNC Arena

2015–16 ACC men's basketball standings
	Conf.				Overall
Team	W		L	PCT	W		L	PCT
No. 3 North Carolina †	14	–	4	.778	33	–	7	.825
No. 4 Virginia	13	–	5	.722	29	–	8	.784
No. 10 Miami (FL)	13	–	5	.722	27	–	8	.771
No. 16 Louisville*	12	–	6	.667	23	–	8	.742
Notre Dame	11	–	7	.611	24	–	12	.667
No. 19 Duke	11	–	7	.611	25	–	11	.694
Virginia Tech	10	–	8	.556	20	–	15	.571
Clemson	10	–	8	.556	17	–	14	.548
Pittsburgh	9	–	9	.500	21	–	12	.636
Syracuse	9	–	9	.500	23	–	14	.622
Georgia Tech	8	–	10	.444	21	–	15	.583
Florida State	8	–	10	.444	20	–	14	.588
NC State	5	–	13	.278	16	–	17	.485
Wake Forest	2	–	16	.111	11	–	20	.355
Boston College	0	–	18	.000	7	–	25	.219
† 2016 ACC tournament winner * Ineligible for both the 2016 ACC tournament and the 2016 NCAA tournament due to self-imposed postseason ban. Rankings from AP poll

The 2015–16 NC State Wolfpack men's basketball team represented North Carolina State University during the 2015–16 NCAA Division I men's basketball season. The Wolfpack were led by fifth-year head coach Mark Gottfried. The team played its home games at PNC Arena and were members of the Atlantic Coast Conference (ACC). They finished the season 16–17, 5–13 in ACC play to finish in 13th place. They defeated Wake Forest in the first round of the ACC tournament to advance to the second round, where they lost to Duke.

== Previous season ==
The Wolfpack finished the season 22–14, 10–8 in ACC play to finish in a tie for sixth place. They advanced to the quarterfinals of the ACC tournament, where they lost to Duke. They received an at-large bid to the NCAA tournament, where they defeated LSU in the second round and Villanova in the third round to advance to the Sweet Sixteen, where they lost to fellow ACC member Louisville.

== Pre-season ==
=== Departures ===
Name	Number	Pos.	Height	Weight	Year	Hometown	Reason for departure
Trevor Lacey	1	G	6'4"	210	RS junior	Huntsville, AL	Declared for 2015 NBA draft
Desmond Lee	5	G	6'4"	200	Senior	Norfolk, VA	Graduated
Patrick Wallace	20	G	6'1"	195	Sophomore	Charlotte, NC	Walk-on; transferred to Charleston Southern
Ralston Turner	22	G	6'6"	205	RS senior	Muscle Shoals, AL	Graduated
Staats Battle	30	G	6'6"	203	Senior	Raleigh, NC	Graduated
Kyle Washington	32	F/C	6'9"	230	Sophomore	Champlin, MN	Transferred to Cincinnati

=== Class of 2015 signees ===
In addition to freshman signees Shaun Kirk and Maverick Rowan, NC State also added University of Charlotte transfer Torin Dorn. Dorn, a sophomore guard who would redshirt the 2015–2016 season due to NCAA transfer rules, was the 2015 Conference USA Freshman of the Year.

College recruiting
Name	Hometown	School	Height	Weight	Commit date
Shaun Kirk; SF	Whiteville, NC	Whiteville HS	6 ft 7 in (2.01 m)	185 lb (84 kg)	Apr 27, 2015
Shaun Kirk; SF	Recruit ratings: Scout: Rivals: 247Sports: ESPN:				
Maverick Rowan; SF	Fort Lauderdale, FL	Cardinal Gibbons HS	6 ft 7 in (2.01 m)	180 lb (82 kg)	Aug 2, 2015
Maverick Rowan; SF	Recruit ratings: Scout: Rivals: 247Sports: ESPN: (86)				
Overall recruit ranking:
Note: In many cases, Scout, Rivals, 247Sports, On3, and ESPN may conflict in their listings of height and weight.; In these cases, the average was taken. ESPN grades are on a 100-point scale.; Sources: "2015 NC State Basketball Commits". Scout.; "ESPN". ESPN.; "Scout.com Team Recruiting Rankings". Scout.; "2015 Team Ranking". Rivals.

== Roster ==
2015–16 NC State Wolfpack men's basketball team
Players
Coaches

Pos.	#	Name	Height	Weight	Year	Hometown
F	0	Abdul-Malik Abu	6 ft 8 in (2.03 m)	240 lb (109 kg)	So	Boston, Massachusetts
F	1	Lennard Freeman	6 ft 8 in (2.03 m)	250 lb (113 kg)	Jr	Washington, D.C.
G	2	Torin Dorn (redshirt)	6 ft 6 in (1.98 m)	205 lb (93 kg)	So	Charlotte, North Carolina
G	3	Terry Henderson	6 ft 4 in (1.93 m)	195 lb (88 kg)	RS Jr	Raleigh, North Carolina
F	4	Chris Brickhouse (W)	6 ft 5 in (1.96 m)	205 lb (93 kg)	Jr	Raleigh, North Carolina
G	12	Cat Barber	6 ft 2 in (1.88 m)	190 lb (86 kg)	Jr	Newport News, Virginia
G	13	Chris Jr. Corchiani (W)	6 ft 0 in (1.83 m)	180 lb (82 kg)	So	Raleigh, North Carolina
G/F	14	Caleb Martin	6 ft 7 in (2.01 m)	215 lb (98 kg)	So	Mocksville, North Carolina
G/F	15	Cody Martin	6 ft 7 in (2.01 m)	210 lb (95 kg)	So	Mocksville, North Carolina
F	21	BeeJay Anya	6 ft 9 in (2.06 m)	285 lb (129 kg)	Jr	Gaithersburg, Maryland
G/F	22	Shaun Kirk	6 ft 8 in (2.03 m)	195 lb (88 kg)	Fr	Whiteville, North Carolina
G/F	24	Maverick Rowan	6 ft 7 in (2.01 m)	215 lb (98 kg)	Fr	Fort Lauderdale, Florida
G	25	Chase Cannon (W)	6 ft 5 in (1.96 m)	200 lb (91 kg)	Sr	Morehead City, North Carolina

Head coach

- Mark Gottfried (Alabama)

Assistant coach(es)

- Orlando Early (Gardner–Webb)
- Bobby Lutz (Charlotte)
- Rob Moxley (Pfeiffer)

Legend

- (C) Team captain
- (S) Suspended
- (I) Ineligible
- (W) Walk-on
- Injured
- Current redshirt

Roster
Last update: October 4, 2015

== Season ==
=== Non-conference play ===
NC State opened the season with an 85–68 win at home to William & Mary. During the loss, guard Terry Henderson suffered torn ligaments in his right ankle and missed the entire season.

== Schedule and results ==
Date time, TV	Rank^{#}	Opponent^{#}	Result	Record	High points	High rebounds	High assists	Site (attendance) city, state
Exhibition
Nov 8, 2015*; 2:00 pm		Cal State Los Angeles	W 71–54		21 – Barber	9 – Abu	6 – Barber	PNC Arena; Raleigh, NC
Non-conference regular season
Nov 13, 2015*; 8:00 pm, ESPN3		William & Mary	L 68–85	0–1	21 – Caleb Martin	6 – Tied	6 – Barber	PNC Arena (16,377); Raleigh, NC
Nov 15, 2015*; 6:00 pm, ESPNU		South Alabama; Legends Classic	W 88–70	1–1	19 – Caleb Martin	12 – Freeman	8 – Barber	PNC Arena (15,076); Raleigh, NC
Nov 18, 2015*; 7:00 pm, ESPN3		IUPUI; Legends Classic	W 79–56	2–1	19 – Barber	9 – Abu	4 – Cody Martin	PNC Arena (14,660); Raleigh, NC
Nov 23, 2015*; 9:30 pm, ESPN3		vs. Arizona State; Legends Classic semifinals	L 76–79	2–2	22 – Barber	6 – Tied	8 – Barber	Barclays Center (5,775); Brooklyn, NY
Nov 24, 2015*; 5:30 pm, ESPNU		vs. No. 22 LSU; Legends Classic 3rd place game	W 83–72	3–2	20 – Barber	12 – Abu	7 – Barber	Barclays Center (4,777); Brooklyn, NY
Nov 27, 2015*; 7:00 pm, ESPN3		Winthrop	W 87–79	4–2	37 – Barber	10 – Freeman	8 – Barber	PNC Arena (15,700); Raleigh, NC
Dec 1, 2015*; 7:00 pm, ESPN2		Michigan; ACC–Big Ten Challenge	L 59–66	4–3	19 – Caleb Martin	7 – 3 Tied	4 – Barber	PNC Arena (17,645); Raleigh, NC
Dec 5, 2015*; 12:00 pm, RSN (FS South)		Bucknell	W 99–86	5–3	27 – Rowan	13 – Freeman	4 – Tied	PNC Arena (16,378); Raleigh, NC
Dec 13, 2015*; 4:00 pm, ESPNU		at South Florida	W 65–46	6–3	19 – Barber	14 – Abu	6 – Barber	USF Sun Dome (2,945); Tampa, FL
Dec 16, 2015*; 7:00 pm, ESPN3		High Point	W 76–73	7–3	26 – Barber	9 – Abu	6 – Barber	PNC Arena (15,602); Raleigh, NC
Dec 19, 2015*; 6:00 pm, SECN		at Missouri	W 73–59	8–3	33 – Barber	11 – Abu	4 – Barber	Mizzou Arena (8,087); Columbia, MO
Dec 22, 2015*; 7:00 pm, ESPN3		UNC Greensboro	W 58–52	9–3	27 – Barber	11 – Abu	2 – 3 Tied	PNC Arena (15,716); Raleigh, NC
Dec 29, 2015*; 7:00 pm, RSN		Northeastern	W 72–66	10–3	29 – Barber	12 – Abu	3 – Tied	PNC Arena (17,074); Raleigh, NC
ACC regular season
Jan 2, 2016; 2:30 pm, ACCN		at Virginia Tech	L 68–73	10–4 (0–1)	21 – Barber	12 – Anya	2 – 3 Tied	Cassell Coliseum (4,971); Blacksburg, VA
Jan 7, 2016; 7:00 pm, ESPN2		No. 16 Louisville	L 72–77	10–5 (0–2)	20 – Barber	12 – Abu	4 – Barber	PNC Arena (17,762); Raleigh, NC
Jan 10, 2016; 8:00 pm, ESPNU		at Wake Forest; Tobacco Road Rivalry	L 74–77	10–6 (0–3)	26 – Barber	11 – Caleb Martin	7 – Tied	LJVM Coliseum (11,865); Winston-Salem, NC
Jan 13, 2016; 9:00 pm, ACCN		Florida State	L 78–85	10–7 (0–4)	22 – Rowan	13 – Abu	6 – Abu	PNC Arena (16,846); Raleigh, NC
Jan 16, 2016; 12:00 pm, ESPN		at No. 5 North Carolina; Carolina–State Game	L 55–67	10–8 (0–5)	12 – Abu	14 – Abu	3 – Tied	Dean Smith Center (21,750); Chapel Hill, NC
Jan 19, 2016; 8:00 pm, ACCN		at No. 21 Pittsburgh	W 78–61	11–8 (1–5)	31 – Barber	14 – Freeman	8 – Barber	Peterson Events Center (9,849); Pittsburgh, PA
Jan 23, 2016; 2:00 pm, CBS		No. 20 Duke; Tobacco Road Rivalry	L 78–88	11–9 (1–6)	19 – Barber	7 – Freeman	6 – Freeman	PNC Arena (19,500); Raleigh, NC
Jan 27, 2016; 8:00 pm, ACCN		Georgia Tech	L 83–90	11–10 (1–7)	36 – Barber	11 – Abu	5 – Barber	PNC Arena (15,945); Raleigh, NC
Jan 30, 2016; 3:00 pm, ACCN		No. 15 Miami (FL)	W 85–69	12–10 (2–7)	30 – Barber	7 – 4 Tied	4 – Tied	PNC Arena (18,103); Raleigh, NC
Feb 1, 2016; 9:00 pm, ESPNU		at Florida State	L 73–77	12–11 (2–8)	31 – Barber	6 – Caleb Martin	4 – Tied	Donald L. Tucker Civic Center (6,375); Tallahassee, FL
Feb 6, 2016; 2:00 pm, ESPN		at Duke; Tobacco Road Rivalry	L 80–88	12–12 (2–9)	26 – Barber	17 – Abu	6 – Barber	Cameron Indoor Stadium (9,314); Durham, NC
Feb 13, 2016; 12:00 pm, RSN (FS South)		Wake Forest; Tobacco Road Rivalry	W 99–88	13–12 (3–9)	38 – Barber	7 – Caleb Martin	3 – Barber	PNC Arena (17,074); Raleigh, NC
Feb 15, 2016; 7:00 pm, ESPN		at No. 7 Virginia	L 53–73	13–13 (3–10)	14 – Barber	6 – Cody Martin	2 – Barber	John Paul Jones Arena (14,016); Charlottesville, VA
Feb 20, 2016; 3:00 pm, ACCN		Clemson	W 77–74	14–13 (4–10)	20 – Rowan	16 – Abu	5 – Barber	PNC Arena (17,536); Raleigh, NC
Feb 24, 2016; 8:00 pm, ACCN		No. 7 North Carolina; Carolina–State Game	L 68–80	14-14 (4–11)	32 – Barber	6 – 4 Tied	3 – Barber	PNC Arena (19,500); Raleigh, NC
Feb 27, 2016; 2:00 pm, ACCN		at Syracuse	L 66–75	14–15 (4–12)	18 – Martin	12 – Abu	4 – Freeman	Carrier Dome (27,141); Syracuse, NY
Mar 2, 2016; 9:00 pm, RSN		Boston College	W 73–72	15–15 (5–12)	24 – Barber	8 – Anya	6 – Barber	PNC Arena (15,152); Raleigh, NC
Mar 5, 2016; 12:00 pm, CBS		at Notre Dame	L 75–89	15–16 (5–13)	29 – Barber	12 – Abu	4 – Cody Martin	Edmund P. Joyce Center (8,715); South Bend, IN
ACC tournament
March 8, 2016; 12:00 pm	(12)	vs. (13) Wake Forest; First round	W 75–72	16–16	24 – Rowan	9 – Tied	6 – Barber	Verizon Center (7,302); Washington, D.C.
March 9, 2016; 2:00 pm	(12)	vs. (5) No. 19 Duke; Second round	L 89–92	16–17	29 – Barber	9 – Abu	7 – Barber	Verizon Center (18,561); Washington, D.C.
*Non-conference game. ^{#}Rankings from AP Poll. (#) Tournament seedings in parentheses. All times are in Eastern Time.
