= 2015–16 Georgia Tech Yellow Jackets men's basketball team =

American college basketball season

2015–16 Georgia Tech Yellow Jackets men's basketball

NIT, Quarterfinals
- Conference: Atlantic Coast Conference
- Record: 21–15 (8–10 ACC)
- Head coach: Brian Gregory (5th season)
- Assistant coaches: Chad Dollar; Mamadou N'Diaye; Tom Herrion
- Home arena: McCamish Pavilion

2015–16 ACC men's basketball standings
| | Conf. | | | | Overall |
| Team | W | | L | PCT | W | | L | PCT |
|---|---|---|---|---|---|---|---|---|
| No. 3 North Carolina † | 14 | – | 4 | .778 | 33 | – | 7 | .825 |
| No. 4 Virginia | 13 | – | 5 | .722 | 29 | – | 8 | .784 |
| No. 10 Miami (FL) | 13 | – | 5 | .722 | 27 | – | 8 | .771 |
| No. 16 Louisville* | 12 | – | 6 | .667 | 23 | – | 8 | .742 |
| Notre Dame | 11 | – | 7 | .611 | 24 | – | 12 | .667 |
| No. 19 Duke | 11 | – | 7 | .611 | 25 | – | 11 | .694 |
| Virginia Tech | 10 | – | 8 | .556 | 20 | – | 15 | .571 |
| Clemson | 10 | – | 8 | .556 | 17 | – | 14 | .548 |
| Pittsburgh | 9 | – | 9 | .500 | 21 | – | 12 | .636 |
| Syracuse | 9 | – | 9 | .500 | 23 | – | 14 | .622 |
| Georgia Tech | 8 | – | 10 | .444 | 21 | – | 15 | .583 |
| Florida State | 8 | – | 10 | .444 | 20 | – | 14 | .588 |
| NC State | 5 | – | 13 | .278 | 16 | – | 17 | .485 |
| Wake Forest | 2 | – | 16 | .111 | 11 | – | 20 | .355 |
| Boston College | 0 | – | 18 | .000 | 7 | – | 25 | .219 |
† 2016 ACC tournament winner * Ineligible for both the 2016 ACC tournament and the 2016 NCAA tournament due to self-imposed postseason ban. Rankings from AP poll

The 2015–16 Georgia Tech Yellow Jackets men's basketball team represented the Georgia Institute of Technology during the 2015–16 NCAA Division I men's basketball season. They were led by fifth year head coach Brian Gregory and played their home games at McCamish Pavilion. They were members of the Atlantic Coast Conference. The Yellow Jackets finished the season 21–15, 8–10 in ACC play to finish in a tie for 11th place. They defeated Clemson in the second round of the ACC tournament to advance to the quarterfinals where they lost to Virginia. They received an invitation to the National Invitation Tournament where they defeated Houston and South Carolina to advance to the quarterfinals where they lost to San Diego State.

On March 25, 2016, Georgia Tech announced Brian Gregory would not return as head coach.

== Last season ==
The Yellow Jackets finished the 2014–15 season 12–19, 3–15 in ACC play to finish in 14th place. They lost in the first round of the ACC tournament to Boston College.

== Departures ==
| Name | Number | Pos. | Height | Weight | Year | Hometown | Notes |
|---|---|---|---|---|---|---|---|
| Demarco Cox | 4 | C | 6'8" | 276 | Senior | Yazoo City, MS | Graduated |
| Bernard Woodside | 30 | G | 6'0" | 170 | Freshman | Tampa, FL | Walk on; didn't return to the team |
| Aaron Peak | 31 | G/F | 6'4" | 188 | Senior | Atlanta, GA | Graduated |
| Brooks Doyle | 32 | G | 6'4" | 199 | Junior | Atlanta, GA | Walk on; didn't return to the team |
| Patrick Lamar | 35 | G | 6'0" | 192 | Freshman | Marietta, GA | Walk on; left the team |
| Collin Gurry | 41 | G | 6'1" | 183 | Junior | Canton, CT | Left the team for personal reasons |
| Ron Wamer | 43 | G | 6'2" | 190 | Junior | Dacula, GA | Left the team for personal reasons |

=== Incoming transfers ===
| Name | Number | Pos. | Height | Weight | Year | Hometown | Previous School |
|---|---|---|---|---|---|---|---|
| Adam Smith | 2 | G | 6'1" | 195 | RS Senior | Jonesboro, GA | Transferred from Virginia Tech. Smith will be eligible to play immediately since Smith graduated from Virginia Tech. |
| James White | 33 | F | 6'8" | 220 | RS Senior | Jonesboro, GA | Transferred from Arkansas–Little Rock. White will be eligible to play immediately since White graduated from Arkansas–Little Rock. |

== Recruiting ==
College recruiting information
| Name | Hometown | School | Height | Weight | Commit date |
|---|---|---|---|---|---|
| Sylvester Ogbonda; C | Fort Washington, MD | National Christian Academy | 6 ft 10 in (2.08 m) | 210 lb (95 kg) | Oct 31, 2014 |
| Sylvester Ogbonda; C | Recruit ratings: Scout: Rivals: 247Sports: ESPN: | | | | |
Overall recruit ranking:
Note: In many cases, Scout, Rivals, 247Sports, On3, and ESPN may conflict in their listings of height and weight.; In these cases, the average was taken. ESPN grades are on a 100-point scale.; Sources: "2015 Team Ranking". Rivals.

== Roster ==
2015–16 Georgia Tech Yellow Jackets men's basketball team
Players
Coaches

| Pos. | # | Name | Height | Weight | Year | Previous school | Hometown |
|---|---|---|---|---|---|---|---|
| F | 0 | Charles Mitchell | 6 ft 8 in (2.03 m) | 269 lb (122 kg) | Sr | Joseph Wheeler High School/University of Maryland | Marietta, Georgia |
| G | 1 | Tadric Jackson | 6 ft 2 in (1.88 m) | 215 lb (98 kg) | So | Tift County High School | Tifton, Georgia |
| G | 2 | Adam Smith | 6 ft 1 in (1.85 m) | 170 lb (77 kg) | RS Sr | Fayette County High School (Georgia)/Virginia Tech | Jonesboro, Georgia |
| G/F | 3 | Marcus Georges-Hunt | 6 ft 5 in (1.96 m) | 214 lb (97 kg) | Sr | North Clayton High School | College Park, Georgia |
| G | 5 | Corey Heyward | 6 ft 1 in (1.85 m) | 214 lb (97 kg) | RS Jr | Peachtree Ridge High School/Hargrave Military Academy | Duluth, Georgia |
| G | 10 | Travis Jorgenson | 6 ft 0 in (1.83 m) | 177 lb (80 kg) | RS So | Rock Bridge High School/New Hampton School | Columbia, Missouri |
| G | 11 | Josh Heath | 6 ft 2 in (1.88 m) | 172 lb (78 kg) | Jr | Tampa Preparatory School/University of South Florida | Tampa, Florida |
| F | 12 | Quinton Stephens | 6 ft 8 in (2.03 m) | 187 lb (85 kg) | Jr | Marist School (Georgia) | Atlanta, Georgia |
| F/C | 24 | Sylvester Ogbonda | 6 ft 10 in (2.08 m) | 233 lb (106 kg) | Fr | National Christian Academy | Fort Washington, Maryland |
| F | 32 | Nick Jacobs | 6 ft 8 in (2.03 m) | 260 lb (118 kg) | RS Sr | South Atlanta High School/University of Alabama | Atlanta, Georgia |
| F | 33 | James White | 6 ft 8 in (2.03 m) | 220 lb (100 kg) | RS Sr | Jonesboro High School (Georgia)/University of Arkansas-Pine Bluff | Jonesboro, Georgia |
| F | 34 | Abdoulaye Gueye | 6 ft 9 in (2.06 m) | 208 lb (94 kg) | So | Central Park Christian | Dakar, Senegal |
| F | 42 | Rand Rowland | 6 ft 7 in (2.01 m) | 206 lb (93 kg) | Jr | White County High School (Cleveland, Georgia) | Cleveland, Georgia |
| C | 44 | Ben Lammers | 6 ft 10 in (2.08 m) | 241 lb (109 kg) | So | Alamo Heights High School | San Antonio, Texas |

Head coach

- Brian Gregory (Oakland)

Assistant coach(es)

- Chad Dollar (South Florida)
- Mamadou N'Diaye (Auburn)
- Tom Herrion (Merrimack)

Legend

- (C) Team captain
- (S) Suspended
- (I) Ineligible
- (W) Walk-on
- Injured
- Current redshirt

Roster

== Schedule ==
| Date time, TV | Rank^{#} | Opponent^{#} | Result | Record | Site (attendance) city, state |
Non-conference regular season
| Nov 13*; 8:00 pm, ESPN3 | | Cornell | W 116–87 | 1–0 | Hank McCamish Pavilion (6,459); Atlanta, GA |
| Nov 16*; 7:00 pm, ESPNU | | Tennessee | W 69–67 | 2–0 | Hank McCamish Pavilion (5,467); Atlanta, GA |
| Nov 19*; 7:00 pm, ESPN3 | | Green Bay; NIT Season Tip-Off | W 107–77 | 3–0 | Hank McCamish Pavilion (4,252); Atlanta, GA |
| Nov 22*; 2:00 pm, ESPN3 | | East Tennessee State; NIT Season Tip-Off | L 68–69 | 3–1 | Hank McCamish Pavilion (4,665); Atlanta, GA |
| Nov 26*; 2:00 pm, ESPNU | | vs. Arkansas; NIT Season Tip-Off semifinals | W 83–73 | 4–1 | Barclays Center; Brooklyn, NY |
| Nov 27*; 3:00 pm, ESPN2 | | vs. No. 8 Villanova; NIT Season Tip-Off Championship game | L 52–69 | 4–2 | Barclays Center; Brooklyn, NY |
| Dec 1*; 7:00 pm, ESPN3 | | Wofford | W 77–61 | 5–2 | Hank McCamish Pavilion (4,389); Atlanta, GA |
| Dec 5*; 5:00 pm, CBSSN | | at Tulane | W 76–68 | 6–2 | Devlin Fieldhouse (2,005); New Orleans, LA |
| Dec 15*; 9:00 pm, ESPN2 | | VCU | W 77–64 | 7–2 | Hank McCamish Pavilion (5,219); Atlanta, GA |
| Dec 19*; 12:00 pm, SECN | | at Georgia | L 61–75 | 7–3 | Stegeman Coliseum (8,011); Athens, GA |
| Dec 21*; 7:00 pm, ESPN3 | | Southeastern Louisiana | W 75–62 | 8–3 | Hank McCamish Pavilion (4,563); Atlanta, GA |
| Dec 23*; 7:00 pm, ESPN3 | | Colgate | W 76–60 | 9–3 | Hank McCamish Pavilion (4,638); Atlanta, GA |
| Dec 29*; 7:00 pm, ESPN3 | | Duquesne | W 73–67 | 10–3 | Hank McCamish Pavilion (5,417); Atlanta, GA |
ACC regular season
| Jan 2; 12:00 pm, ACCN | | at No. 7 North Carolina | L 78–86 | 10–4 (0–1) | Dean Smith Center (17,392); Chapel Hill, NC |
| Jan 6; 7:00 pm, RSN | | at No. 24 Pittsburgh | L 84–89 | 10–5 (0–2) | Peterson Events Center (10,249); Pittsburgh, PA |
| Jan 9; 2:00 pm, ACCN | | No. 4 Virginia | W 68–64 | 11–5 (1–2) | Hank McCamish Pavilion (8,073); Atlanta, GA |
| Jan 13; 9:00 pm, ACCN | | at Notre Dame | L 64–72 | 11–6 (1–3) | Edmund P. Joyce Center (7,795); South Bend, IN |
| Jan 16; 12:00 pm, RSN | | Virginia Tech | L 77–78 | 11–7 (1–4) | Hank McCamish Pavilion (6,470); Atlanta, GA |
| Jan 23; 4:00 pm, ESPN2 | | No. 17 Louisville | L 71–75 | 11–8 (1–5) | Hank McCamish Pavilion (7,829); Atlanta, GA |
| Jan 27; 8:00 pm, ACCN | | at NC State | W 90–83 | 12–8 (2–5) | PNC Arena (15,945); Raleigh, NC |
| Jan 30; 12:00 pm, ESPNU | | at Syracuse | L 57–60 | 12–9 (2–6) | Carrier Dome (25,235); Syracuse, NY |
| Feb 2; 9:00 pm, ESPNU | | Duke | L 71–80 | 12–10 (2–7) | Hank McCamish Pavilion (8,600); Atlanta, GA |
| Feb 7; 1:00 pm, ESPNU | | Miami (FL) | L 68–75 | 12–11 (2–8) | Hank McCamish Pavilion (5,569); Atlanta, GA |
| Feb 10; 7:00 pm, RSN | | Wake Forest | W 71–66 | 13–11 (3–8) | Hank McCamish Pavilion (5,089); Atlanta, GA |
| Feb 13; 2:00 pm, RSN | | at Clemson | L 52–66 | 13–12 (3–9) | Bon Secours Wellness Arena (12,232); Greenville, SC |
| Feb 17; 9:00 pm, ACCN | | at Florida State | W 86–80 | 14–12 (4–9) | Donald L. Tucker Civic Center (6,217); Tallahassee, FL |
| Feb 20; 8:00 pm, ESPN2 | | No. 19 Notre Dame | W 63–62 | 15–12 (5–9) | Hank McCamish Pavilion (8,600); Atlanta, GA |
| Feb 23; 7:00 pm, RSN | | Clemson | W 75–73 | 16–12 (6–9) | Hank McCamish Pavilion (5,531); Atlanta, GA |
| Feb 27; 12:00 pm, RSN | | at Boston College | W 76–71 | 17–12 (7–9) | Conte Forum (4,148); Chestnut Hill, MA |
| Mar 1; 8:00 pm, ACCN | | at Louisville | L 53–56 | 17–13 (7–10) | KFC Yum! Center (22,043); Louisville, KY |
| Mar 5; 2:00 pm, ACCN | | Pittsburgh | W 63–59 | 18–13 (8–10) | Hank McCamish Pavilion (7,042); Atlanta, GA |
ACC tournament
| Mar 9; 7:00 pm, ESPN2 | (10) | vs. (7) Clemson; Second Round | W 88–85 ^{OT} | 19–13 | Verizon Center (18,561); Washington, D.C. |
| Mar 10; 7:00 pm, ESPN | (10) | vs. (2) No. 4 Virginia; Quarterfinals | L 52–72 | 19–14 | Verizon Center (20,719); Washington, D.C. |
NIT
| Mar 16*; 8:00 pm, ESPN2 | (4) | (5) Houston; First Round – South Carolina Bracket | W 81–62 | 20–14 | Hank McCamish Pavilion (2,932); Atlanta, GA |
| Mar 21*; 9:00 pm, ESPN | (4) | at (1) South Carolina; Second Round – South Carolina Bracket | W 83–66 | 21–14 | Colonial Life Arena (2,856); Columbia, SC |
| Mar 23*; 9:00 pm, ESPN2 | (4) | at (2) San Diego State; Quarterfinals – South Carolina Bracket | L 56–72 | 21–15 | Viejas Arena (12,414); San Diego, CA |
*Non-conference game. ^{#}Rankings from AP Poll. (#) Tournament seedings in parentheses. All times are in Eastern Time.
