= 2015–16 Florida State Seminoles men's basketball team =

American college basketball season

2015–16 Florida State Seminoles men's basketball

NIT, Second Round
- Conference: Atlantic Coast Conference
- Record: 20–14 (8–10 ACC)
- Head coach: Leonard Hamilton (14th year)
- Assistant coaches: Stan Jones (14th year); Dennis Gates (5th year); Charlton Young (3rd year)
- Home arena: Donald L. Tucker Center (Capacity: 12,100)

2015–16 ACC men's basketball standings
	Conf.				Overall
Team	W		L	PCT	W		L	PCT
No. 3 North Carolina †	14	–	4	.778	33	–	7	.825
No. 4 Virginia	13	–	5	.722	29	–	8	.784
No. 10 Miami (FL)	13	–	5	.722	27	–	8	.771
No. 16 Louisville*	12	–	6	.667	23	–	8	.742
Notre Dame	11	–	7	.611	24	–	12	.667
No. 19 Duke	11	–	7	.611	25	–	11	.694
Virginia Tech	10	–	8	.556	20	–	15	.571
Clemson	10	–	8	.556	17	–	14	.548
Pittsburgh	9	–	9	.500	21	–	12	.636
Syracuse	9	–	9	.500	23	–	14	.622
Georgia Tech	8	–	10	.444	21	–	15	.583
Florida State	8	–	10	.444	20	–	14	.588
NC State	5	–	13	.278	16	–	17	.485
Wake Forest	2	–	16	.111	11	–	20	.355
Boston College	0	–	18	.000	7	–	25	.219
† 2016 ACC tournament winner * Ineligible for both the 2016 ACC tournament and the 2016 NCAA tournament due to self-imposed postseason ban. Rankings from AP poll

The 2015–16 Florida State Seminoles men's basketball team, variously Florida State or FSU, represented Florida State University during the 2015–16 NCAA Division I men's basketball season. The Seminoles were led by fourteenth year head coach Leonard Hamilton and played their home games at the Donald L. Tucker Center on the university's Tallahassee, Florida campus. They were members of the Atlantic Coast Conference.

The Seminoles finished the season 20–14, 8–10 in ACC play, to finish in a tie for eleventh place. They defeated Boston College in the first round of the ACC tournament to advance to the second round where they lost to Virginia Tech. They received an invitation to the National Invitation Tournament where they defeated Davidson in the first round to advance to the second round where they lost to Valparaiso.

== Previous season ==
Florida State finished the 2014–15 season 17–16, 8–10 in ACC play, to finish in a tie for tenth place. They lost in the quarterfinals of the ACC Tournament to top-seeded Virginia. The Seminoles missed the postseason for the first time since 2005.

== Departures ==
Name	Number	Pos.	Height	Weight	Year	Hometown	Notes
Dayshawn Watkins	4	G	6'0"	180	Sophomore	North Little Rock, AR	Transferred to Little Rock
Kiel Turpin	11	C	7'0"	240	GS Senior	Normal, IL	Graduated
Aaron Thomas	25	G	6'5"	195	Sophomore	Cincinnati, OH	Overseas Professional League

=== Transfers ===
Name	Number	Pos.	Height	Weight	Year	Hometown	Previous School
Benji Bell	3	G	6'4"	190	Junior	Gainesville, FL	Junior college transfer from Northwest Florida State College

== Recruits ==
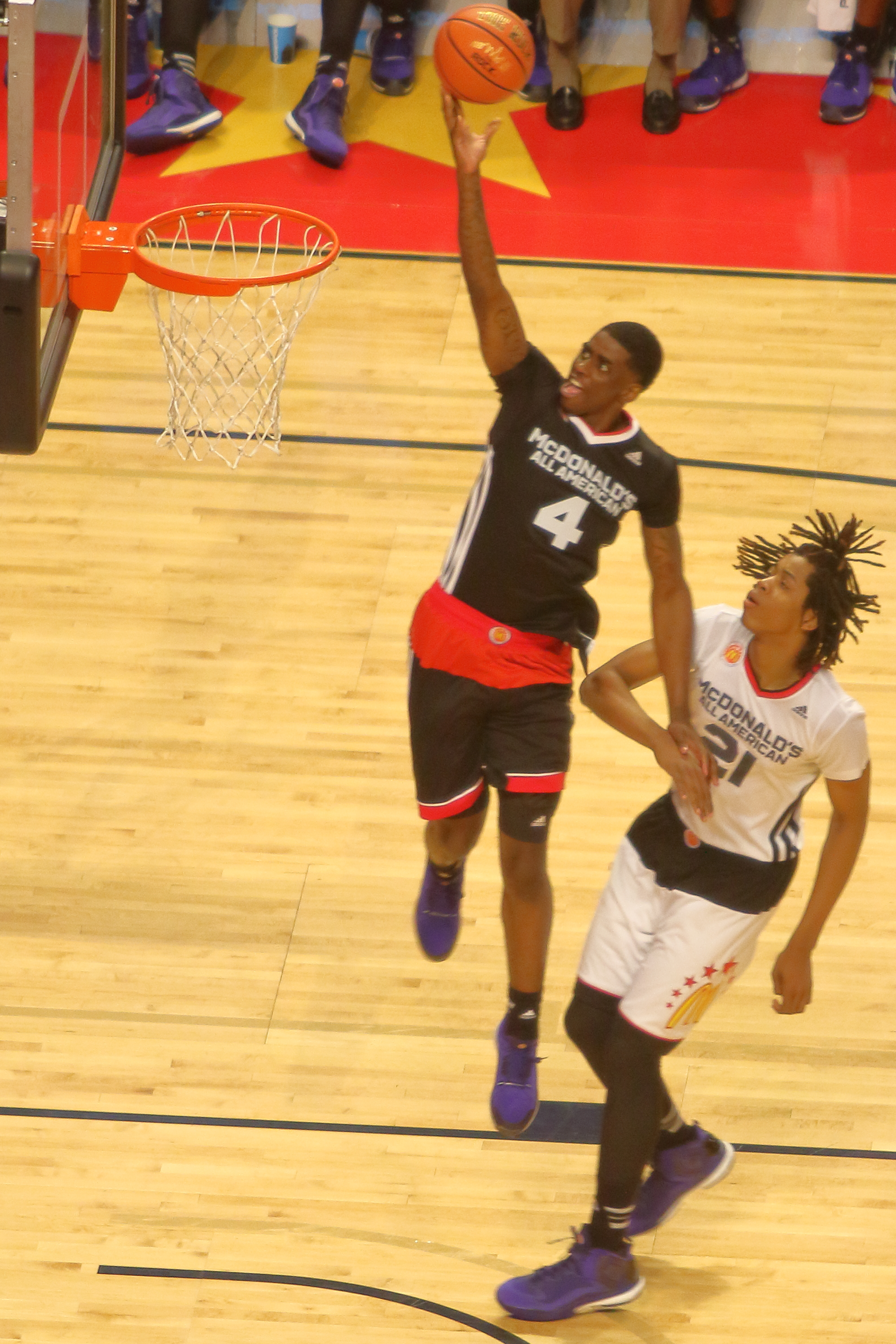
Dwayne Bacon at the 2015 McDonald's All-American Boys Game

2015 recruiting class

College recruiting
Name	Hometown	School	Height	Weight	Commit date
Dwayne Bacon; SG	Lakeland, FL	Oak Hill Academy	6 ft 6 in (1.98 m)	209 lb (95 kg)	Sep 5, 2014
Dwayne Bacon; SG	Recruit ratings: Scout: Rivals: 247Sports: ESPN:				
Malik Beasley; SG	Atlanta, GA	Saint Francis High School	6 ft 4 in (1.93 m)	185 lb (84 kg)	Sep 5, 2014
Malik Beasley; SG	Recruit ratings: Scout: Rivals: 247Sports: ESPN:				
Terance Mann; SG	Lowell, MA	Tilton School	6 ft 5 in (1.96 m)	175 lb (79 kg)	Aug 20, 2014
Terance Mann; SG	Recruit ratings: Scout: Rivals: 247Sports: ESPN:				
Jean Marc Christ Koumadje; C	Montverde, FL	Montverde Academy	7 ft 2 in (2.18 m)	235 lb (107 kg)	Sep 22, 2014
Jean Marc Christ Koumadje; C	Recruit ratings: Scout: Rivals: 247Sports: ESPN:				
Overall recruit ranking: Scout: N/A Rivals: N/A ESPN: N/A
Note: In many cases, Scout, Rivals, 247Sports, On3, and ESPN may conflict in their listings of height and weight.; In these cases, the average was taken. ESPN grades are on a 100-point scale.; Sources: "2015 Team Ranking". Rivals.

2016 recruiting class

College recruiting (2016)
Name	Hometown	School	Height	Weight	Commit date
Jonathan Isaac; SF	Naples, FL	IMG Academy	6 ft 9 in (2.06 m)	190 lb (86 kg)	Jul 6, 2015
Jonathan Isaac; SF	Recruit ratings: Scout: Rivals: 247Sports: ESPN:				
Trent Forrest; PG	Chipley, FL	Chipley High School	6 ft 4 in (1.93 m)	185 lb (84 kg)	May 5, 2015
Trent Forrest; PG	Recruit ratings: Scout: Rivals: 247Sports: ESPN:				
C.J. Walker; PG	Indianapolis, IN	Arsenal Technical High School	6 ft 0 in (1.83 m)	170 lb (77 kg)	Jun 20, 2015
C.J. Walker; PG	Recruit ratings: Scout: Rivals: 247Sports: ESPN:				
Overall recruit ranking: Scout: N/A Rivals: N/A ESPN: N/A
Note: In many cases, Scout, Rivals, 247Sports, On3, and ESPN may conflict in their listings of height and weight.; In these cases, the average was taken. ESPN grades are on a 100-point scale.; Sources: "2016 Team Ranking". Rivals.

== Roster ==
2015–16 Florida State Seminoles men's basketball team
Players
Coaches

Pos.	#	Name	Height	Weight	Year	Previous school	Hometown
F	0	Phil Cofer	6 ft 8 in (2.03 m)	218 lb (99 kg)	So	Whitewater	Atlanta, GA
G	1	Devon Bookert	6 ft 3 in (1.91 m)	198 lb (90 kg)	Sr	West Anchorage	Anchorage, AK
G	3	Benji Bell	6 ft 4 in (1.93 m)	204 lb (93 kg)	Jr	Northwest Florida State; Blanche Ely	Gainesville, FL
G	4	Dwayne Bacon	6 ft 7 in (2.01 m)	221 lb (100 kg)	Fr	Oak Hill Academy	Lakeland, FL
G	5	Malik Beasley	6 ft 5 in (1.96 m)	196 lb (89 kg)	Fr	Saint Francis School	Alpharetta, GA
G	14	Terance Mann	6 ft 6 in (1.98 m)	204 lb (93 kg)	Fr	Tilton School	Lowell, MA
C	15	Boris Bojanovsky	7 ft 3 in (2.21 m)	248 lb (112 kg)	Sr	Oakley College	Bratislava, Slovakia
C	21	Christ Koumadje	7 ft 4 in (2.24 m)	233 lb (106 kg)	Fr	Montverde Academy	N'Djamena, Chad
G	22	Xavier Rathan-Mayes	6 ft 4 in (1.93 m)	208 lb (94 kg)	RS So	Huntington Prep	Scarborough, ON
F	23	Jarquez Smith	6 ft 9 in (2.06 m)	236 lb (107 kg)	Jr	Jones County	Haddock, GA
G	24	Robbie Berwick	6 ft 4 in (1.93 m)	188 lb (85 kg)	So	Atascadero	Atascadero, CA
G	31	Michael Saxton	6 ft 5 in (1.96 m)	213 lb (97 kg)	Sr	Tallahassee CC; Lake Highland Prep	Orlando, FL
G	32	Montay Brandon	6 ft 8 in (2.03 m)	229 lb (104 kg)	Sr	Wesleyan Christian	Greensboro, NC
F	40	Brandon Allen (W)	6 ft 6 in (1.98 m)	209 lb (95 kg)	Jr	Milton	Milton, FL
C	50	Michael Ojo	7 ft 1 in (2.16 m)	304 lb (138 kg)	Sr	Tennessee Temple	Lagos, Nigeria

Head coach

- Leonard Hamilton (UT Martin)

Assistant coach(es)

- Stan Jones (Memphis)
- Dennis Gates (California)
- Charlton Young (Georgia Southern)

Legend

- (C) Team captain
- (S) Suspended
- (I) Ineligible
- (W) Walk-on
- Injured
- Current redshirt

Roster

=== Depth chart ===
Pos.	Starting 5	Bench
C	Boris Bojanovsky
PF	Phil Cofer
SF	Dwayne Bacon
SG	Malik Beasley
PG	Xavier Rathan-Mayes

== Rankings ==
Ranking movement Legend: ██ Increase in ranking. ██ Decrease in ranking. (RV) Received votes but unranked. (NR) Not ranked.
Poll	Pre	Wk 2	Wk 3	Wk 4	Wk 5	Wk 6	Wk 7	Wk 8	Wk 9	Wk 10	Wk 11	Wk 12	Wk 13	Wk 14	Wk 15	Wk 16	Wk 17	Wk 18	Wk 19	Final
AP	RV	RV	NR	NR	NR	NR	NR	NR	NR	NR	NR	NR	NR	NR	NR	NR	NR	NR	NR	N/A
Coaches	RV	RV	NR	NR	NR	NR	NR	NR	NR	NR	NR	NR	NR	NR	NR	NR	NR	NR	NR	NR

== Schedule ==
Florida State was picked to finish sixth in the ACC while Xavier Rathan-Mayes was named to the preseason All-ACC team.

Date time, TV	Rank^{#}	Opponent^{#}	Result	Record	High points	High rebounds	High assists	Site (attendance) city, state
Exhibition
November 2*; 7:00 p.m.		Lynn	W 114–68	0–0	19 – Bookert	12 – Bojanovsky	6 – Mann	Donald L. Tucker Center; Tallahassee, FL
November 9*; 7:00 p.m.		Southeastern	W 117–76	0–0	23 – Beasley	5 – Tied	12 – Rathan-Mayes	Donald L. Tucker Center; Tallahassee, FL
Non-conference regular season
November 15*; 3:00 p.m., ESPN3		Nicholls State	W 109–62	1–0	23 – Bacon	8 – Bacon	11 – Rathan-Mayes	Donald L. Tucker Center (6,094); Tallahassee, FL
November 17*; 9:00 p.m., RSN		Jacksonville	W 98–79	2–0	27 – Bacon	9 – Bacon	5 – Rathan-Mayes	Donald L. Tucker Center (5,943); Tallahassee, FL
November 20*; 3:30 p.m., CBSSN		vs. Hofstra; Paradise Jam first round	L 77–82	2–1	25 – Beasley	7 – Brandon	4 – Rathan-Mayes	Sports and Fitness Center (–); Saint Thomas, USVI
November 21*; 6:30 p.m., CBSSN		vs. DePaul; Paradise Jam second round (consolation)	W 83–67	3–1	19 – Bacon	5 – Tied	8 – Rathan-Mayes	Sports and Fitness Center (2,205); Saint Thomas, USVI
November 23*; 4:00 p.m., CBSSN		vs. Ohio; Paradise Jam fifth place game	W 90–81	4–1	25 – Bacon	7 – Bacon	6 – Rathan-Mayes	Sports and Fitness Center (1,433); Saint Thomas, USVI
December 2*; 9:15 p.m., ESPNU		at Iowa; ACC–Big Ten Challenge	L 75–78 ^{OT}	4–2	20 – Beasley	11 – Bojanovsky	6 – Bookert	Carver–Hawkeye Arena (11,247); Iowa City, IA
December 6*; 2:00 p.m., ESPNU		vs. VCU; Philips Arena Showcase	W 76–71	5–2	23 – Rathan-Mayes	7 – Rathan-Mayes	4 – Tied	Philips Arena (1,786); Atlanta, GA
December 13*; 3:00 p.m., ESPN3		Southeastern Louisiana	W 75–58	6–2	18 – Bell	8 – Beasley	11 – Rathan-Mayes	Donald L. Tucker Center (4,992); Tallahassee, FL
December 16*; 9:00 p.m., ESPN2		Mississippi State	W 90–66	7–2	20 – Bacon	10 – Tied	4 – Rathan-Mayes	Donald L. Tucker Center (5,466); Tallahassee, FL
December 19*; 5:00 p.m., FSN		vs. Florida Atlantic; Orange Bowl Basketball Classic	W 64–59	8–2	23 – Bacon	10 – Beasley	4 – Rathan-Mayes	BB&T Center (9,483); Sunrise, FL
December 21*; 2:00 p.m., ESPN3		Charleston Southern	W 75–64	9–2	20 – Bacon	10 – Bacon	5 – Rathan-Mayes	Donald L. Tucker Center (4,979); Tallahassee, FL
December 29*; 7:00 p.m., ESPN2		at Florida; Rivalry	W 73–71	10–2	24 – Bacon	6 – Rathan-Mayes	4 – Bell	O'Connell Center (10,121); Gainesville, FL
ACC regular season
January 2; 12:00 p.m., RSN		at Clemson	L 75–84	10–3 (0–1)	23 – Beasley	6 – Beasley	5 – Rathan-Mayes	Bon Secours Wellness Arena (9,945); Greenville, SC
January 4; 7:00 p.m., ESPN		No. 6 North Carolina	L 90–106	10–4 (0–2)	30 – Rathan-Mayes	8 – Beasley	3 – Tied	Donald L. Tucker Center (11,095); Tallahassee, FL
January 9; 5:00 p.m., ESPN2		at No. 12 Miami (FL)	L 59–72	10–5 (0–3)	13 – Beasley	9 – Beasley	4 – Rathan-Mayes	BankUnited Center (7,972); Coral Gables, FL
January 13; 9:00 p.m., ACCN		at NC State	W 85–78	11–5 (1–3)	22 – Beasley	9 – Tied	7 – Rathan-Mayes	PNC Arena (16,846); Raleigh, NC
January 17; 6:30 p.m., ESPNU		No. 13 Virginia	W 69–62	12–5 (2–3)	18 – Bacon	9 – Bacon	3 – Bookert	Donald L. Tucker Center (9,158); Tallahassee, FL
January 20; 9:00 p.m., ESPNU		at No. 17 Louisville	L 65–84	12–6 (2–4)	23 – Beasley	10 – Bacon	2 – Tied	KFC Yum! Center (21,349); Louisville, KY
January 23; 4:00 p.m., ACCN		No. 21 Pittsburgh	L 72–74	12–7 (2–5)	16 – Beasley	8 – Bojanovsky	4 – Bookert	Donald L. Tucker Center (9,160); Tallahassee, FL
January 26; 7:00 p.m., ESPNU		at Boston College	W 72–62	13–7 (3–5)	22 – Beasley	14 – Bacon	9 – Rathan-Mayes	Conte Forum (2,074); Chestnut Hill, MA
January 30; 12:00 p.m., RSN		Clemson	W 76–65	14–7 (4–5)	21 – Bacon	6 – Tied	5 – Bookert	Donald L. Tucker Center (8,166); Tallahassee, FL
February 1; 9:00 p.m., ESPNU		NC State	W 77–73	15–7 (5–5)	20 – Bacon	9 – Bojanovsky	5 – Brandon	Donald L. Tucker Center (6,375); Tallahassee, FL
February 6; 12:00 p.m., RSN		at Wake Forest	W 91–71	16–7 (6–5)	16 – Beasley	7 – Bojanovsky	5 – Bookert	LJVM Coliseum (9,796); Winston-Salem, NC
February 11; 7:00 p.m., ESPN		at Syracuse	L 72–85	16–8 (6–6)	15 – Bookert	7 – Bojanovsky	5 – Tied	Carrier Dome (22,056); Syracuse, NY
February 14; 6:30 p.m., ESPNU		No. 12 Miami (FL)	L 65–67	16–9 (6–7)	14 – Bookert	6 – Bacon	3 – Rathan-Mayes	Donald L. Tucker Center (9,492); Tallahassee, FL
February 17; 9:00 p.m., ACCN		Georgia Tech	L 80–86	16–10 (6–8)	18 – Mann	7 – Bacon	6 – Rathan-Mayes	Donald L. Tucker Center (6,217); Tallahassee, FL
February 20; 3:00 p.m., ACCN		at Virginia Tech	L 73–83	16–11 (6–9)	22 – Bacon	8 – Beasley	2 – Tied	Cassell Coliseum (9,567); Blacksburg, VA
February 25; 7:00 p.m., ESPN		at No. 15 Duke	L 65–80	16–12 (6–10)	13 – Rathan-Mayes	10 – Bacon	3 – Bookert	Cameron Indoor Stadium (9,314); Durham, NC
February 27; 4:00 p.m., ESPN2		No. 23 Notre Dame	W 77–56	17–12 (7–10)	21 – Bacon	9 – Bojanovsky	3 – Tied	Donald L. Tucker Center (7,819); Tallahassee, FL
March 5; 2:00 p.m., ESPN2		Syracuse	W 78–73	18–12 (8–10)	20 – Bacon	8 – Tied	4 – Bookert	Donald L. Tucker Center (7,769); Tallahassee, FL
ACC tournament
March 8; 2:00 p.m., ESPN2/ACCN	(11)	vs. (14) Boston College; First Round	W 88–66	19–12	15 – Bookert	5 – Bookert	4 – Tied	Verizon Center (7,302); Washington, D.C.
March 9; 9:00 p.m., ESPN2/ACCN	(11)	vs. (6) Virginia Tech; Second Round	L 85–96	19–13	19 – Bookert	14 – Smith	5 – Rathan-Mayes	Verizon Center (18,561); Washington, D.C.
National Invitation tournament
March 15*; 7:00 p.m., ESPN2	(4)	(5) Davidson; First Round – Valparaiso Bracket	W 84–74	20–13	23 – Bacon	9 – Beasley	5 – Tied	Donald L. Tucker Center (2,496); Tallahassee, FL
March 17*; 7:00 p.m., ESPNews	(4)	at (1) Valparaiso; Second Round – Valparaiso Bracket	L 69–81	20–14	19 – Rathan-Mayes	6 – Tied	4 – Bacon	Athletics–Recreation Center (4,991); Valparaiso, IN
*Non-conference game. ^{#}Rankings from AP Poll. (#) Tournament seedings in parentheses. All times are in Eastern Time.

== Awards ==
=== Watchlists ===
- Bob Cousy Award

Xavier Rathan-Mayes

- Lute Olson Award

Xavier Rathan-Mayes

- Wooden Award

Xavier Rathan-Mayes

- Wayman Tisdale Award

Dwayne Bacon
Malik Beasley

=== Honors ===
- ACC Player of the Week
  - Dwayne Bacon (rookie)
  - Malik Beasley (rookie)
- Freshman of the Week
  - Dwayne Bacon

==== All-ACC ====
- Honorable Mention
  - Malik Beasley
- Freshman Team
  - Dwayne Bacon
  - Malik Beasley

==== All-Americans ====
- Freshman Team
  - Dwayne Bacon
  - Malik Beasley

=== NBA draft ===
One player was selected in the 2016 NBA draft.

Round	Pick	Name	Team
1st	19	Malik Beasley	Denver Nuggets

== Media ==
Florida State basketball is broadcast on the Florida State University Seminoles Radio Network.
