= 2015–16 Wake Forest Demon Deacons men's basketball team =

American college basketball season

2015–16 Wake Forest Demon Deacons men's basketball
- Conference: Atlantic Coast Conference
- Record: 11–20 (2–16 ACC)
- Head coach: Danny Manning (2nd season)
- Assistant coaches: Steve Woodberry; Randolph Childress; Brett Ballard
- Home arena: LJVM Coliseum

2015–16 ACC men's basketball standings
	Conf.				Overall
Team	W		L	PCT	W		L	PCT
No. 3 North Carolina †	14	–	4	.778	33	–	7	.825
No. 4 Virginia	13	–	5	.722	29	–	8	.784
No. 10 Miami (FL)	13	–	5	.722	27	–	8	.771
No. 16 Louisville*	12	–	6	.667	23	–	8	.742
Notre Dame	11	–	7	.611	24	–	12	.667
No. 19 Duke	11	–	7	.611	25	–	11	.694
Virginia Tech	10	–	8	.556	20	–	15	.571
Clemson	10	–	8	.556	17	–	14	.548
Pittsburgh	9	–	9	.500	21	–	12	.636
Syracuse	9	–	9	.500	23	–	14	.622
Georgia Tech	8	–	10	.444	21	–	15	.583
Florida State	8	–	10	.444	20	–	14	.588
NC State	5	–	13	.278	16	–	17	.485
Wake Forest	2	–	16	.111	11	–	20	.355
Boston College	0	–	18	.000	7	–	25	.219
† 2016 ACC tournament winner * Ineligible for both the 2016 ACC tournament and the 2016 NCAA tournament due to self-imposed postseason ban. Rankings from AP poll

The 2015–16 Wake Forest Demon Deacons men's basketball team represented Wake Forest University during the 2015–16 NCAA Division I men's basketball season. The Demon Deacons were led by second-year head coach Danny Manning. The team played home games at the Lawrence Joel Veterans Memorial Coliseum in Winston-Salem, North Carolina, and were a member of the Atlantic Coast Conference. The Demon Deacons finished season 11–20, 2–16 in ACC play to finish in 14th place. They lost to NC State in the first round of the ACC tournament.

== Previous season ==
The Demon Deacons finished the season 13–19, 5–11 in ACC play to finish twelfth place. They lost in the first round of the ACC tournament to Virginia Tech.

== Departures ==
Name	Number	Pos.	Height	Weight	Year	Hometown	Notes
Daniel Green	4	F	6'10"	230	RS Junior	Colleyville, TX	Graduate transferred to Arkansas–Little Rock
Darius Leonard	13	F	6'9"	225	Senior	Raleigh, NC	Graduated
Aaron Rountree III	33	F	6'8"	195	Junior	Wilson, NC	Graduate transferred to Iona
Doug Niedrich	52	F	6'6"	200	Senior	Kildeer, IL	Graduated

=== Incoming transfers ===
Name	Number	Pos.	Height	Weight	Year	Hometown	Previous School
Keyshawn Woods	30	G	6'3"	182	Sophomore	Gastonia, NC	Transferred from Charlotte. Under NCAA transfer rules, Woods will have to sit out for the 2015–16 season. Will have three years of remaining eligibility.

== Recruiting ==
College recruiting information
Name	Hometown	School	Height	Weight	Commit date
Doral Moore; C	Locust Grove, GA	Montverde Academy	7 ft 0 in (2.13 m)	240 lb (110 kg)	Oct 8, 2014
Doral Moore; C	Recruit ratings: Scout: Rivals: 247Sports: ESPN:				
Bryant Crawford; PG	Kensington, MD	Gonzaga College High School	6 ft 2 in (1.88 m)	182 lb (83 kg)	Sep 21, 2014
Bryant Crawford; PG	Recruit ratings: Scout: Rivals: 247Sports: ESPN:				
John Collins; PF	West Palm Beach, FL	Cardinal Newman High School	6 ft 8 in (2.03 m)	221 lb (100 kg)	Sep 21, 2014
John Collins; PF	Recruit ratings: Scout: Rivals: 247Sports: ESPN:				
Overall recruit ranking:
Note: In many cases, Scout, Rivals, 247Sports, On3, and ESPN may conflict in their listings of height and weight.; In these cases, the average was taken. ESPN grades are on a 100-point scale.; Sources: "2015 Team Ranking". Rivals.

=== Recruiting class of 2016 ===
College recruiting information (2016)
Name	Hometown	School	Height	Weight	Commit date
Brandon Childress; PG	Winston-Salem, NC	Wesleyan Christian Academy	6 ft 0 in (1.83 m)	170 lb (77 kg)	Oct 25, 2014
Brandon Childress; PG	Recruit ratings: Scout: Rivals: 247Sports: ESPN:				
Overall recruit ranking:
Note: In many cases, Scout, Rivals, 247Sports, On3, and ESPN may conflict in their listings of height and weight.; In these cases, the average was taken. ESPN grades are on a 100-point scale.; Sources: "2015 Team Ranking". Rivals.

== Roster ==
2015–16 Wake Forest Demon Deacons men's basketball team
Players
Coaches

Pos.	#	Name	Height	Weight	Year	Previous school	Hometown
G	0	Codi Miller-McIntyre	6 ft 3 in (1.91 m)	205 lb (93 kg)	Sr	Hargrave Military Acad.	Concord, NC
G	1	Madison Jones	6 ft 1 in (1.85 m)	165 lb (75 kg)	Sr	Ravenscroft School	Raleigh, NC
F	2	Devin Thomas	6 ft 9 in (2.06 m)	255 lb (116 kg)	Sr	Central Dauphin HS	Harrisburg, PA
C	4	Doral Moore	7 ft 1 in (2.16 m)	250 lb (113 kg)	Fr	Montverde Academy	Locust Grove, GA
G	10	Mitchell Wilbekin	6 ft 1 in (1.85 m)	165 lb (75 kg)	So	The Rock School	Gainesville, FL
G	11	Greg McClinton	6 ft 7 in (2.01 m)	200 lb (91 kg)	RS So	Hargrave Military Acad.	Winston-Salem, NC
G	13	Bryant Crawford	6 ft 3 in (1.91 m)	190 lb (86 kg)	Fr	Gonzaga College HS	Kensington, MD
F	20	John Collins	6 ft 10 in (2.08 m)	218 lb (99 kg)	Fr	Cardinal Newman HS	West Palm Beach, FL
G	23	Rondale Watson	6 ft 3 in (1.91 m)	190 lb (86 kg)	So	Greenbrier East HS	Lewisburg, WV
F	25	Cornelius Hudson	6 ft 6 in (1.98 m)	180 lb (82 kg)	So	Mansfield Timberview HS	Dallas, TX
G	30	Keyshawn Woods (I) (redshirt)	6 ft 3 in (1.91 m)	182 lb (83 kg)	So	Northside Christian Academy; Charlotte	Gastonia, NC
C	31	Andre Washington	7 ft 0 in (2.13 m)	240 lb (109 kg)	Sr	Hargrave Military Acad.	Roanoke, VA
G	35	Stephen Prendergast (W)	6 ft 1 in (1.85 m)	175 lb (79 kg)	Sr	Don Bosco Prep	Mahwah, NJ
G	40	Anthony Bilas (W)	6 ft 2 in (1.88 m)	160 lb (73 kg)	Fr	Charlotte Latin School	Charlotte, NC
F	42	Gilbert McGregor (W)	6 ft 4 in (1.93 m)	195 lb (88 kg)	RS Jr	Brewster Academy	New Orleans, LA
G	43	Trent VanHorn	6 ft 3 in (1.91 m)	210 lb (95 kg)	Jr	Canterbury School	Fort Wayne, IN
F	44	Konstantinos Mitoglou	6 ft 10 in (2.08 m)	225 lb (102 kg)	So	Aristoteleio College of Thessaloniki	Thessaloniki, Greece
F	45	Troy Rike (W)	6 ft 7 in (2.01 m)	195 lb (88 kg)	So	St. Ignatius College Preparatory	San Francisco, CA
F	51	Grant O'Brien (W)	6 ft 7 in (2.01 m)	200 lb (91 kg)	Jr	The Governor's Academy	North Andover, MA
G	52	Britton Anderson (W)	6 ft 4 in (1.93 m)	190 lb (86 kg)	So	Flint Hill School	Great Falls, VA

Head coach

- Danny Manning (Kansas)

Assistant coach(es)

- Steve Woodberry (Kansas)
- Randolph Childress (Wake Forest)
- Brett Ballard (Kansas)

Legend

- (C) Team captain
- (S) Suspended
- (I) Ineligible
- (W) Walk-on
- Injured
- Current redshirt

Roster

== Schedule ==
Date time, TV	Opponent	Result	Record	Site (attendance) city, state
Exhibition
Nov 6, 2015*; 7:00 pm	UNC Pembroke	W 86–64		LJVM Coliseum (5,412); Winston-Salem, NC
Non-conference regular season
Nov 13, 2015*; 8:00 pm, ESPN3	UMBC	W 78–73	1–0	LJVM Coliseum (6,904); Winston-Salem, NC
Nov 15, 2015*; 1:00 pm, CBSSN	at Bucknell	W 90–82	2–0	Sojka Pavilion (3,247); Lewisburg, PA
Nov 18, 2015*; 7:00 pm, ESPN3	Richmond	L 82–91	2–1	LJVM Coliseum (7,021); Winston-Salem, NC
Nov 23, 2015*; 5:00 pm, ESPN2	vs. No. 13 Indiana; Maui Invitational quarterfinals	W 82–78	3–1	Lahaina Civic Center (2,400); Maui, HI
Nov 24, 2015*; 7:30 pm, ESPN	vs. No. 19 Vanderbilt; Maui Invitational semifinals	L 64–86	3–2	Lahaina Civic Center (2,400); Maui, HI
Nov 25, 2015*; 7:30 pm, ESPN2	vs. UCLA; Maui Invitational 3rd place game	W 80–77	4–2	Lahaina Civic Center (2,400); Maui, HI
Nov 30, 2015*; 7:00 pm, ESPN2	at Rutgers; ACC–Big Ten Challenge	W 69–68	5–2	The RAC (3,817); Piscataway, NJ
Dec 4, 2015*; 7:00 pm, ESPN3	Arkansas	W 88–85	6–2	LJVM Coliseum (9,488); Winston-Salem, NC
Dec 15, 2015*; 7:00 pm, ESPN3	UNC Greensboro	W 81–71	7–2	LJVM Coliseum (7,249); Winston-Salem, NC
Dec 18, 2015*; 7:00 pm, ESPN3	Coastal Carolina	W 83–77	8–2	LJVM Coliseum (8,107); Winston-Salem, NC
Dec 22, 2015*; 7:00 pm, RSN	No. 6 Xavier; Skip Prosser Classic	L 70–78	8–3	LJVM Coliseum (12,938); Winston-Salem, NC
Dec 29, 2015*; 6:00 pm, ESPNU	at LSU	W 77–71	9–3	Maravich Center (12,104); Baton Rouge, LA
ACC regular season
Jan 3, 2016; 8:00 pm, ESPNU	at No. 18 Louisville	L 57–65	9–4 (0–1)	KFC Yum! Center (21,302); Louisville, KY
Jan 6, 2016; 7:00 pm, ESPNU	No. 14 Duke	L 75–91	9–5 (0–2)	LJVM Coliseum (13,466); Winston-Salem, NC
Jan 10, 2016; 8:00 pm, ESPNU	NC State	W 77–74	10–5 (1–2)	LJVM Coliseum (11,865); Winston-Salem, NC
Jan 13, 2016; 9:00 pm, RSN	at Virginia Tech	L 91–93	10–6 (1–3)	Cassell Coliseum (4,985); Blacksburg, VA
Jan 16, 2016; 12:00 pm, ACCN	Syracuse	L 55–83	10–7 (1–4)	LJVM Coliseum (11,592); Winston-Salem, NC
Jan 20, 2016; 7:00 pm, ESPN2	at No. 2 North Carolina	L 68–83	10–8 (1–5)	Dean Smith Center (19,053); Chapel Hill, NC
Jan 23, 2016; 12:00 pm, ACCN	No. 15 Miami (FL)	L 63–77	10–9 (1–6)	LJVM Coliseum (6,928); Winston-Salem, NC
Jan 26, 2016; 7:00 pm, ESPN3	No. 11 Virginia	L 71–72	10–10 (1–7)	LJVM Coliseum (9,221); Winston-Salem, NC
Jan 31, 2016; 1:00 pm, ACCN	at No. 25 Notre Dame	L 62–85	10–11 (1–8)	Edmund P. Joyce Center (9,149); South Bend, IN
Feb 2, 2016; 8:00 pm, ACCN	Clemson	L 62–76	10–12 (1–9)	LJVM Coliseum (8,716); Winston-Salem, NC
Feb 6, 2016; 12:00 pm, RSN	Florida State	L 71–91	10–13 (1–10)	LJVM Coliseum (9,796); Winston-Salem, NC
Feb 10, 2016; 7:00 pm, RSN	at Georgia Tech	L 66–71	10–14 (1–11)	Hank McCamish Pavilion (5,089); Atlanta, GA
Feb 13, 2016; 12:00 pm, RSN	at NC State	L 88–99	10–15 (1–12)	PNC Arena (17,074); Raleigh, NC
Feb 16, 2016; 7:00 pm, ESPNU	at Pittsburgh	L 96–101 ^{2 OT}	10–16 (1–13)	Peterson Events Center (8,825); Pittsburgh, PA
Feb 21, 2016; 6:30 pm, ESPNU	Boston College	W 74–48	11–16 (2–13)	LJVM Coliseum (8,542); Winston-Salem, NC
Feb 24, 2016; 9:00 pm, RSN	No. 23 Notre Dame	L 58–69	11–17 (2–14)	LJVM Coliseum (8,498); Winston-Salem, NC
Feb 28, 2016; 6:30 pm, ESPNU	Virginia Tech	L 74–81	11–18 (2–15)	LJVM Coliseum (9,404); Winston-Salem, NC
Mar 1, 2016; 8:00 pm, ACCN	at Duke	L 71–79	11–19 (2–16)	Cameron Indoor Stadium (9,314); Durham, NC
ACC tournament
Mar 8, 2016; 12:00 pm, ESPN2	vs. NC State; First round	L 72–75	11–20	Verizon Center (7,302); Washington, D.C.
*Non-conference game. ^{#}Rankings from AP Poll. (#) Tournament seedings in parentheses. All times are in Eastern Time..
