= 2015–16 Pittsburgh Panthers men's basketball team =

American college basketball season

2015–16 Pittsburgh Panthers men's basketball

Gotham Classic Champions

NCAA tournament, First Round
- Conference: Atlantic Coast Conference
- Record: 21–12 (9–9 ACC)
- Head coach: Jamie Dixon (13th season)
- Assistant coaches: Brandin Knight (8th season); Bill Barton (5th season); Marlon Williamson (2nd season)
- Home arena: Petersen Events Center (Capacity: 12,508)

2015–16 ACC men's basketball standings
	Conf.				Overall
Team	W		L	PCT	W		L	PCT
No. 3 North Carolina †	14	–	4	.778	33	–	7	.825
No. 4 Virginia	13	–	5	.722	29	–	8	.784
No. 10 Miami (FL)	13	–	5	.722	27	–	8	.771
No. 16 Louisville*	12	–	6	.667	23	–	8	.742
Notre Dame	11	–	7	.611	24	–	12	.667
No. 19 Duke	11	–	7	.611	25	–	11	.694
Virginia Tech	10	–	8	.556	20	–	15	.571
Clemson	10	–	8	.556	17	–	14	.548
Pittsburgh	9	–	9	.500	21	–	12	.636
Syracuse	9	–	9	.500	23	–	14	.622
Georgia Tech	8	–	10	.444	21	–	15	.583
Florida State	8	–	10	.444	20	–	14	.588
NC State	5	–	13	.278	16	–	17	.485
Wake Forest	2	–	16	.111	11	–	20	.355
Boston College	0	–	18	.000	7	–	25	.219
† 2016 ACC tournament winner * Ineligible for both the 2016 ACC tournament and the 2016 NCAA tournament due to self-imposed postseason ban. Rankings from AP poll

The 2015–16 Pittsburgh Panthers men's basketball team represented the University of Pittsburgh during the 2015–16 NCAA Division I men's basketball season. The team played its home games at the Petersen Events Center in Pittsburgh, Pennsylvania. The Panthers were led by thirteenth-year head coach Jamie Dixon. They were members of the Atlantic Coast Conference. They finished the season 21–12, 9–9 in ACC play to finish in a tie for ninth place. They defeated Syracuse in the second round of the ACC tournament to advance to the quarterfinals where they lost to North Carolina. They received an at-large bid to the NCAA tournament where, as a #10 seed, they lost in the first round to Wisconsin.

On March 21, 2016, head coach Jamie Dixon resigned to become the head coach at TCU. He finished at Pittsburgh with a 13-year record of 328–123 and went to the postseason in every season.

== Last season ==
The Panthers finished the 2014–15 season 19–15, 8–10 in ACC play to finish in a three-way tie for ninth place. They lost in the second round of the ACC tournament to NC State. They were invited to the National Invitation Tournament where they lost in the first round to George Washington.

== Departures ==
Name	Number	Pos.	Height	Weight	Year	Hometown	Notes
Cameron Wright	3	G	6'4"	205	(redshirt) Senior	Cleveland, OH	Graduated
Durand Johnson	5	F	6'6"	195	(redshirt) Junior	Baltimore, MD	Graduate transferred to St. John's
Derrick Randall	11	F	6'8"	240	Senior	Brooklyn, NY	Graduated
Josh Newkirk	13	G	6'1"	175	Junior	Raleigh, NC	Transferred to Indiana
Aron Nwankwo	15	F	6'7"	215	Senior	Baltimore, MD	Walk on; graduated
Joshua Ko	22	G	6'1"	150	Sophomore	Kailua, HI	Walk-on; left the team for personal reasons
Tyrone Haughton	44	C	6'9"	220	Junior	Miami, FL	Transferred to Arkansas Tech
Joseph Uchebo	50	C	6'10"	260	Junior	Enugu, Nigeria	Graduate transferred to Charlotte

=== Incoming transfers ===
Name	Number	Pos.	Height	Weight	Year	Hometown	Previous School
Rafael Maia	5	F	6'9"	245	(redshirt) Senior	São Paulo, Brazil	Transferred from Brown. Will be eligible to play immediately since Maia graduated from Brown.
Sterling Smith	15	G	6'4"	185	(redshirt) Senior	Chico, CA	Transferred from Coppin State. Will be eligible to play immediately since Smith graduated from Coppin State.
Rozelle Nix	25	C	6'11"	335	Junior	Cincinnati, OH	Junior college transferred from Pensacola State College.
Alonzo Nelson-Ododa	33	F	6'9"	235	(redshirt) Senior	Atlanta, GA	Transferred from Richmond. Will be eligible to play immediately since Nelson-Ododa graduated from Richmond.
Zach Smith	35	G	6'3"	200	Junior	Smethport, PA	Transferred from Pitt-Bradford. Redshirting the 2015-16 season due to NCAA transfer rules.
Jonathan Milligan	55	G	6'2"	170	Junior	Orlando, FL	Junior college transferred from Kilgore College.

== Class of 2015 signees ==
College recruiting information
Name	Hometown	School	Height	Weight	Commit date
Damon Wilson Jr. PG	Powder Springs, GA	Our Savior New American School	6 ft 5 in (1.96 m)	200 lb (91 kg)	Nov 5, 2013
Damon Wilson Jr. PG	Recruit ratings: Scout: Rivals: 247Sports: ESPN:				
Overall recruit ranking:
Note: In many cases, Scout, Rivals, 247Sports, On3, and ESPN may conflict in their listings of height and weight.; In these cases, the average was taken. ESPN grades are on a 100-point scale.; Sources: "2015 Team Ranking". Rivals.

== Class of 2016 signees ==
College recruiting information (2016)
Name	Hometown	School	Height	Weight	Commit date
Corey Manigault; C	Suitland, MD	Paul VI High School	6 ft 8 in (2.03 m)	225 lb (102 kg)	Mar 16, 2015
Corey Manigault; C	Recruit ratings: Scout: Rivals: 247Sports: ESPN:				
Overall recruit ranking:
Note: In many cases, Scout, Rivals, 247Sports, On3, and ESPN may conflict in their listings of height and weight.; In these cases, the average was taken. ESPN grades are on a 100-point scale.; Sources: "2015 Team Ranking". Rivals.

== Roster ==
2015–16 Pittsburgh Panthers men's basketball team
Players
Coaches

Pos.	#	Name	Height	Weight	Year	Previous school	Hometown
G	0	James Robinson	6 ft 3 in (1.91 m)	198 lb (90 kg)	Sr	DeMatha Catholic	Mitchellville, MD
F	1	Jamel Artis	6 ft 7 in (2.01 m)	220 lb (100 kg)	Jr	Notre Dame Prep (Fitchburg, MA)	Baltimore, MD
F	2	Michael Young	6 ft 8 in (2.03 m)	235 lb (107 kg)	Jr	St. Benedict's (Newark, NJ)	Duquesne, PA
G	3	Damon Wilson	6 ft 5 in (1.96 m)	200 lb (91 kg)	Fr	Our Savior New American	Powder Springs, GA
F	4	Ryan Luther	6 ft 9 in (2.06 m)	215 lb (98 kg)	So	Hampton	Gibsonia, PA
F	5	Rafael Maia (redshirt)	6 ft 9 in (2.06 m)	245 lb (111 kg)	Sr	Maine Central Institute; Brown	São Paulo, Brazil
G/F	12	Chris Jones (redshirt)	6 ft 6 in (1.98 m)	210 lb (95 kg)	Jr	Teaneck	Teaneck, NJ
G	15	Sterling Smith (redshirt)	6 ft 4 in (1.93 m)	185 lb (84 kg)	Sr	Redemption Christ Academy; Coppin State	Chico, CA
F	21	Sheldon Jeter	6 ft 8 in (2.03 m)	225 lb (102 kg)	Jr	Beaver Falls; Polk State College	Beaver Falls, PA
G	23	Cameron Johnson (redshirt)	6 ft 7 in (2.01 m)	185 lb (84 kg)	Fr	Our Lady of the Sacred Heart	Moon Township, PA
G	24	Mike Lecak (W) (redshirt)	6 ft 2 in (1.88 m)	175 lb (79 kg)	Sr	North Canyon (Phoenix, AZ); Wheeling Jesuit	Pittsburgh, PA
C	25	Rozelle Nix	6 ft 11 in (2.11 m)	300 lb (136 kg)	Jr	Withrow; Pensacola State College	Cincinnati, OH
F	33	Alonzo Nelson-Ododa (redshirt)	6 ft 9 in (2.06 m)	235 lb (107 kg)	Sr	Norcross; Richmond	Atlanta, GA
G	35	Zach Smith (redshirt)	6 ft 3 in (1.91 m)	200 lb (91 kg)	Jr	Smethport; Pitt-Bradford	Smethport, PA
F	50	Ryan Seelye (W)	6 ft 6 in (1.98 m)	225 lb (102 kg)	Fr	Elk County Catholic	St. Marys, PA
G	55	Jonathan Milligan	6 ft 2 in (1.88 m)	170 lb (77 kg)	Jr	Mount Zion Christian (Durham, NC); Kilgore	Orlando, FL

Head coach

- Jamie Dixon (TCU)

Assistant coach(es)

- Brandin Knight (Pittsburgh)
- Bill Barton (Salem State)
- Marlon Williamson (Youngstown State)

Legend

- (C) Team captain
- (S) Suspended
- (I) Ineligible
- (W) Walk-on
- Injured
- Current redshirt

Roster

== Schedule ==
Date time, TV	Rank^{#}	Opponent^{#}	Result	Record	Site (attendance) city, state
Exhibition
Fri. Nov. 6*; 7:00 pm		Gannon	W 80–50	—	Petersen Events Center (5,249); Pittsburgh, PA
Regular season
Fri. Nov. 13*; 7:30 pm, ESPN		vs. No. 9 Gonzaga; Armed Forces Classic	Cancelled (Note: The referees cancelled the game at halftime due to dangerous court conditions. The game did not count toward either team's win–loss record, and player statistics from the game were not counted as official. Pittsburgh was leading 37–35.)		Marine Corps Base Camp Smedley D. Butler; Okinawa, Japan
Tue. Nov. 17*; 7:00 pm, ESPN3		Saint Joseph's (IN)	W 84–43	1–0	Petersen Events Center (6,219); Pittsburgh, PA
Fri. Nov. 20*; 8:00 pm, ESPN3		Detroit	W 95–79	2–0	Petersen Events Center (7,819); Pittsburgh, PA
Wed. Nov. 25*; 7:00 pm, ESPN3		Cornell	W 93–49	3–0	Petersen Events Center (7,720); Pittsburgh, PA
Sat. Nov. 28*; 4:00 pm, ESPN3		Kent State	W 85–76	4–0	Petersen Events Center (7,815); Pittsburgh, PA
Tue. Dec. 1*; 9:00 pm, ESPN2		No. 11 Purdue; ACC–Big Ten Challenge	L 59–72	4–1	Petersen Events Center (9,439); Pittsburgh, PA
Fri. Dec. 4*; 7:00 pm, CBSSN		vs. Duquesne; The City Game	W 96–75	5–1	Consol Energy Center (13,906); Pittsburgh, PA
Sun. Dec. 6*; 12:00 pm, ESPN3		Central Arkansas	W 100–47	6–1	Petersen Events Center (7,049); Pittsburgh, PA
Fri. Dec. 11*; 7:00 pm, ESPN3		Eastern Washington; Gotham Classic	W 84–51	7–1	Petersen Events Center (7,614); Pittsburgh, PA
Sun. Dec. 13*; 4:00 pm, ESPN3		Morehead State; Gotham Classic	W 72–62	8–1	Petersen Events Center (7,065); Pittsburgh, PA
Sun. Dec. 20*; 12:00 pm, ESPNU		vs. Davidson; Gotham Classic	W 94–69	9–1	Madison Square Garden (7,345); New York City, NY
Wed. Dec. 23*; 7:00 pm, ACCRSN		Western Carolina; Gotham Classic	W 79–73	10–1	Petersen Events Center (8,025); Pittsburgh, PA
Wed. Dec. 30; 9:00 pm, ESPN2		Syracuse	W 72–61	11–1 (1–0)	Petersen Events Center (10,429); Pittsburgh, PA
Sat. Jan. 2*; 4:00 pm, ESPN3		Maryland Eastern Shore	W 92–58	12–1	Petersen Events Center (8,649); Pittsburgh, PA
Wed. Jan. 6; 7:00 pm, ACCRSN	No. 24	Georgia Tech	W 89–84	13–1 (2–0)	Petersen Events Center (10,249); Pittsburgh, PA
Sat. Jan. 9; 4:00 pm, ACCRSN	No. 24	at Notre Dame	W 86–82	14–1 (3–0)	Edmund P. Joyce Center (8,298); Notre Dame, IN
Thu. Jan. 14; 9:00 pm, ESPN	No. 20	at No. 21 Louisville	L 41–59	14–2 (3–1)	KFC Yum! Center (21,632); Louisville, KY
Sat. Jan. 16; 2:00 pm, ACCRSN	No. 20	Boston College	W 84–61	15–2 (4–1)	Petersen Events Center (10,260); Pittsburgh, PA
Tue. Jan 19; 8:00 pm, ACCN		NC State	L 61–78	15–3 (4–2)	Petersen Events Center (9,849); Pittsburgh, PA
Sat. Jan. 23; 4:00 pm, ACCN		at Florida State	W 74–72	16–3 (5–2)	Donald L. Tucker Center (9,160); Tallahassee, FL
Wed. Jan. 27; 7:00 pm, ACCRSN		at Clemson	L 60–73	16–4 (5–3)	Bon Secours Wellness Arena (8,752); Greenville, SC
Sun. Jan. 31; 6:30 pm, ESPNU		Virginia Tech	W 90–71	17–4 (6–3)	Petersen Events Center (10,049); Pittsburgh, PA
Sat. Feb. 6; 12:00 pm, ACCN		No. 9 Virginia	L 50–64	17–5 (6–4)	Petersen Events Center (12,508); Pittsburgh, PA
Tue. Feb. 9; 7:00 pm, ESPNU		at No. 12 Miami (FL)	L 63–65	17–6 (6–5)	BankUnited Center (6,609); Coral Gables, FL
Sun. Feb. 14; 1:00 pm, ACCN		at No. 9 North Carolina	L 64–85	17–7 (6–6)	Dean E. Smith Center (20,011); Chapel Hill, NC
Tue. Feb. 16; 7:00 pm, ESPNU		Wake Forest	W 101–96 ^{2OT}	18–7 (7–6)	Petersen Events Center (8,825); Pittsburgh, PA
Sat. Feb. 20; 2:00 pm, ESPN2		at Syracuse	W 66–52	19–7 (8–6)	Carrier Dome (28,696); Syracuse, NY
Wed. Feb. 24; 8:00 pm, ACCN		No. 11 Louisville	L 60–67	19–8 (8–7)	Petersen Events Center (10,425); Pittsburgh, PA
Sun. Feb. 28; 2:00 pm, CBS		No. 15 Duke	W 76–62	20–8 (9–7)	Petersen Events Center (12,508); Pittsburgh, PA
Wed. Mar. 2; 7:00 pm, ESPN3		at Virginia Tech	L 61–65	20–9 (9–8)	Cassell Coliseum (6,949); Blacksburg, VA
Sat. Mar. 5; 2:00 pm, ACCN		at Georgia Tech	L 59–63	20–10 (9–9)	Hank McCamish Pavilion (7,042); Atlanta, GA
ACC Tournament
Wed. Mar. 9; 12:00 pm, ESPN/ACCN	(8)	vs. (9) Syracuse; Second Round	W 72–71	21–10	Verizon Center (18,561); Washington, D.C.
Thu. Mar. 10; 12:00 pm, ESPN/ACCN	(8)	vs. (1) No. 7 North Carolina; Quarterfinals	L 71–88	21–11	Verizon Center (18,561); Washington, D.C.
NCAA tournament
Fri. Mar. 18*; 6:50 pm, TNT	(10 E)	vs. (7 E) Wisconsin; First Round	L 43–47	21–12	Scottrade Center (14,425); St. Louis, MO
*Non-conference game. ^{#}Rankings from AP Poll. (#) Tournament seedings in parentheses. E=East Region. All times are in Eastern Time.
