= 2016 ACC men's basketball tournament =

- 2016 ACC Tournament logo
- Classification: Division I
- Season: 2015–16
- Teams: 14
- Site: Verizon Center; Washington D.C.
- Champions: North Carolina (18th title)
- Winning coach: Roy Williams (3rd title)
- MVP: Joel Berry II (North Carolina)
- Attendance: 125,142
- Television: ESPN, ACCN

2015–16 ACC men's basketball standings
| | Conf. | | | | Overall |
| Team | W | | L | PCT | W | | L | PCT |
|---|---|---|---|---|---|---|---|---|
| No. 3 North Carolina † | 14 | – | 4 | .778 | 33 | – | 7 | .825 |
| No. 4 Virginia | 13 | – | 5 | .722 | 29 | – | 8 | .784 |
| No. 10 Miami (FL) | 13 | – | 5 | .722 | 27 | – | 8 | .771 |
| No. 16 Louisville* | 12 | – | 6 | .667 | 23 | – | 8 | .742 |
| Notre Dame | 11 | – | 7 | .611 | 24 | – | 12 | .667 |
| No. 19 Duke | 11 | – | 7 | .611 | 25 | – | 11 | .694 |
| Virginia Tech | 10 | – | 8 | .556 | 20 | – | 15 | .571 |
| Clemson | 10 | – | 8 | .556 | 17 | – | 14 | .548 |
| Pittsburgh | 9 | – | 9 | .500 | 21 | – | 12 | .636 |
| Syracuse | 9 | – | 9 | .500 | 23 | – | 14 | .622 |
| Georgia Tech | 8 | – | 10 | .444 | 21 | – | 15 | .583 |
| Florida State | 8 | – | 10 | .444 | 20 | – | 14 | .588 |
| NC State | 5 | – | 13 | .278 | 16 | – | 17 | .485 |
| Wake Forest | 2 | – | 16 | .111 | 11 | – | 20 | .355 |
| Boston College | 0 | – | 18 | .000 | 7 | – | 25 | .219 |
† 2016 ACC tournament winner * Ineligible for both the 2016 ACC tournament and the 2016 NCAA tournament due to self-imposed postseason ban. Rankings from AP poll

The 2016 Atlantic Coast Conference men's basketball tournament is the postseason men's basketball tournament for the Atlantic Coast Conference and was held at the Verizon Center in Washington D.C. from March 8 to 12, 2016. The winner of the tournament receives the conference's automatic bid to the 2016 NCAA tournament. The tournament included 14 of the 15 ACC teams due to Louisville's self-imposed postseason ban. This was the 20th consecutive ACC Tournament that featured Duke or UNC in the championship game.

== Seeds ==
The top 10 teams received first round byes and the top 4 teams received double byes to the Quarterfinals.

Teams were seeded by record within the conference, with a tiebreaker system to seed teams with identical conference records.

| Seed | School | Conference | Tiebreaker | Tiebreaker 2 |
|---|---|---|---|---|
| 1 | North Carolina | 14–4 | | |
| 2 | Virginia | 13–5 | 1–1 vs. Miami (FL) | 1–0 vs. North Carolina |
| 3 | Miami (FL) | 13–5 | 1–1 vs. Virginia | 0–1 vs. North Carolina |
| 4 | Notre Dame | 11–7 | 1–0 vs. Duke | |
| 5 | Duke | 11–7 | 0–1 vs. Notre Dame | |
| 6 | Virginia Tech | 10–8 | 1–0 vs. Clemson | |
| 7 | Clemson | 10–8 | 0–1 vs. Virginia Tech | |
| 8 | Pittsburgh | 9–9 | 2–0 vs. Syracuse | |
| 9 | Syracuse | 9–9 | 0–2 vs. Pittsburgh | |
| 10 | Georgia Tech | 8–10 | 1–0 vs. Florida State | |
| 11 | Florida State | 8–10 | 0–1 vs. Georgia Tech | |
| 12 | NC State | 5–13 | | |
| 13 | Wake Forest | 2–16 | | |
| 14 | Boston College | 0–18 | | |

== Schedule ==
| Session | Game | Time* | Matchup^{#} | Television | Attendance |
First round – Tuesday, March 8
| Opening Day | 1 | 12:00 pm | #12 NC State 75 vs #13 Wake Forest 72 | ESPN2; ACC Network | 7,302 |
| Opening Day | 2 | 2:00 pm | #11 Florida State 88 vs #14 Boston College 66 | ESPN2; ACC Network | 7,302 |
Second round – Wednesday, March 9
| 1 | 3 | 12:00 pm | #8 Pittsburgh 72 vs #9 Syracuse 71 | ESPN; ACC Network | 18,561 |
| 1 | 4 | 2:00 pm | #5 Duke 92 vs #12 NC State 89 | ESPN; ACC Network | 18,561 |
| 2 | 5 | 7:00 pm | #7 Clemson 85 vs #10 Georgia Tech 88 (OT) | ESPN2; ACC Network | 18,561 |
| 2 | 6 | 9:00 pm | #6 Virginia Tech 96 vs #11 Florida State 85 | ESPN2; ACC Network | 18,561 |
Quarterfinals – Thursday, March 10
| 3 | 7 | 12:00 pm | #1 North Carolina 88 vs #8 Pittsburgh 71 | ESPN; ACC Network | 18,561 |
| 3 | 8 | 2:00 pm | #4 Notre Dame 84 vs #5 Duke 79 (OT) | ESPN; ACC Network | 18,561 |
| 4 | 9 | 7:00 pm | #2 Virginia 72 vs #10 Georgia Tech 52 | ESPN; ACC Network | 20,719 |
| 4 | 10 | 9:00 pm | #3 Miami 88 vs #6 Virginia Tech 82 | ESPN; ACC Network | 20,719 |
Semifinals – Friday, March 11
| 5 | 11 | 7:00 pm | #1 North Carolina 78 vs #4 Notre Dame 47 | ESPN; ACC Network | 20,719 |
| 5 | 12 | 9:00 pm | #2 Virginia 73 vs #3 Miami 68 | ESPN; ACC Network | 20,719 |
Championship – Saturday, March 12
| 6 | 13 | 9:00 pm | #1 North Carolina 61 vs #2 Virginia 57 | ESPN; ACC Network | 20,719 |
*Game times in ET. #–Rankings denote tournament seed

== Bracket ==
First round Tuesday, March 8
12 | NC State | 75
13 | Wake Forest | 72
11 | Florida State | 88
14 | Boston College | 66

Second round Wednesday, March 9
8 | Pittsburgh | 72
9 | Syracuse | 71
5 | Duke | 92
12 | NC State | 89
7 | Clemson | 85
10 | Georgia Tech | 88^{OT}
6 | Virginia Tech | 96
11 | Florida State | 85

Quarterfinals; Thursday, March 10
1 | North Carolina | 88
8 | Pittsburgh | 71
4 | Notre Dame | 84^{OT}
5 | Duke | 79
2 | Virginia | 72
10 | Georgia Tech | 52
3 | Miami | 88
6 | Virginia Tech | 82

Semifinals; Friday, March 11
1 | North Carolina | 78
4 | Notre Dame | 47
2 | Virginia | 73
3 | Miami | 68

Championship; Saturday, March 12
1 | North Carolina | 61
2 | Virginia | 57

== Awards and honors ==
Tournament MVP: Joel Berry II, North Carolina

All-Tournament Teams:

First Team
- Joel Berry II, North Carolina
- Marcus Paige, North Carolina
- Malcolm Brogdon, Virginia
- Anthony Gill, Virginia
- Brice Johnson, North Carolina

Second Team
- London Perrantes, Virginia
- Sheldon McClellan, Miami
- Seth Allen, Virginia Tech
- Grayson Allen, Duke
- Zach Auguste, Notre Dame

== See also ==
- 2016 ACC women's basketball tournament
