= ACC Network (syndication package) =

Syndicated package of college sports telecasts

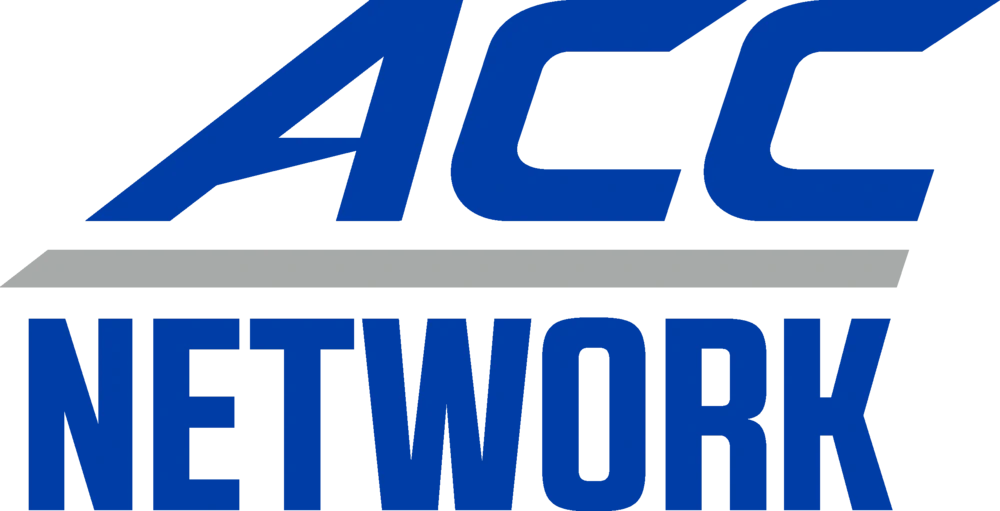
- Country: United States
- Availability: Regional
- Headquarters: Charlotte, North Carolina
- Broadcast area: United States
- Owner: Raycom Sports
- Parent: Gray Media
- Key people: Ken Haines; (President & CEO, Raycom Sports); John Swofford; (Commissioner of the ACC); John Skipper; (President, ESPN Inc.)
- Established: December 8, 1982
- Launch date: September 2010
- Dissolved: March 17, 2019
- Affiliates: list of affiliates
- Official website: www.theacc.com www.raycomsports.com

ACC Network was a syndicated package of college sports telecasts featuring football and basketball events from the Atlantic Coast Conference, produced by Raycom Sports, the sports syndication unit of Montgomery, Alabama-based Raycom Media (later acquired by Gray Media).

The package stemmed from a joint venture between Raycom and Jefferson-Pilot Teleproductions, which acquired the rights to ACC basketball in 1982 under the banner Raycom/JP Sports. In 2004, Jefferson-Pilot's ACC football package (which began in 1984) was also moved under Raycom/JP Sports. Jefferson-Pilot was acquired by Lincoln National Corporation in 2006, who would in turn sell its media assets to Raycom in 2006. In 2010, ESPN acquired the rights to ACC basketball and football, but continued to sublicense games to Raycom Sports to continue the syndicated package, which was relaunched under the ACC Network brand. Broadcast games were shown locally on over-the-air broadcast stations, regional sports networks, as well as streaming on ESPN3 and WatchESPN.

In July 2016, ESPN announced an extension of its contract and plans to launch an ACC cable channel of the same name in 2019, and took ownership of the ACC rights that were previously sublicensed to Raycom. In anticipation of the new channel, the "ACC Network" branding during its syndicated telecasts was phased out in 2018. Although ESPN will continue to subcontract Raycom Sports resources for the new channel, Raycom's final syndicated ACC telecast—the 2019 ACC men's basketball championship game—aired March 16, 2019.

== History ==
ACC men's basketball had been broadcast by Raycom/JP Sports, a joint venture of Raycom Sports and Jefferson-Pilot Teleproductions, since the 1982–83 basketball season. The roots of the current package date to 1957, when Greensboro businessman C.D. Chesley hastily assembled a five-station network to broadcast North Carolina's appearance in that year's Final Four. The Tar Heels went on to win the national championship, and Chesley expanded to a full-season package for the 1957–58 season. Chelsey retained the rights until his retirement in 1981, and then Baltimore-based Metrosports had the ACC rights just for the 1981–82 season.

The first ACC basketball telecast by Raycom/JP Sports was an early-season game between the Virginia Cavaliers and the Duke Blue Devils on the night of December 8, 1982. It was uncertain whether this first broadcast was going to happen at all until the 9 p.m. tip-off; many East Coast network affiliates were unexpectedly carrying national coverage of a hostage situation at the Washington Monument, tying up the AT&T network lines required for Raycom to distribute the game.

Jefferson-Pilot Teleproductions was the sole producer of ACC football beginning with the 1984 football season; the first ACC football telecast saw the Maryland Terrapins (now a Big Ten member) hosting the then-independent Syracuse Orange (a current ACC member) on September 8 that year. The Raycom/JP Sports joint venture began to include ACC football for the 2004 season.

In 2006, JP Sports' parent company, the Jefferson Pilot Corporation, merged with Lincoln National Corporation, taking the broadcasting and sports broadcasting divisions with it. JP Sports became Lincoln Financial Sports, thereby renaming the joint venture Raycom/LF Sports. Lincoln announced the sale of its media assets to Raycom Media in November 2007, making Raycom Sports the sole producer of all ACC projects and, from January 2008 until March 2009, SEC men's basketball and football.

In 2010, ESPN acquired rights to ACC football and basketball, replacing Raycom. In a discussion between ACC commissioner John Swofford and then-ESPN president John Skipper, Swofford acknowledged Raycom's long-standing relationship with the conference, and requested that it continue to be involved in some way. ESPN negotiated a sublicensing agreement with Raycom, which would allow it to continue producing a syndicated package of ACC football and basketball broadcasts. As a condition of the deal, they were rebranded under the new on-air title ACC Network. As part of the agreement, Raycom also agreed to operate the ACC's website and digital properties. It was suggested that ESPN agreed to Raycom's involvement, so it would not create conflicts with the SEC Network—ESPN Regional Television's then-new package of syndicated Southeastern Conference football and basketball games, established after ESPN replaced Raycom as the SEC's main rightsholder besides CBS.

Raycom began syndicating the ACC Network beyond the ACC footprint sometime between 2010 and 2013. Beginning with the 2014–15 academic season, following the discontinuation of ESPN's syndicated SEC package after the launch of the SEC Network cable channel, Raycom expanded the ACC Network's distribution up to 84% of all United States markets.

On July 21, 2016, ESPN announced a 20-year extension of its ACC rights, and that it would launch a new ACC cable network, also known as ACC Network, in 2019, with its accompanying digital platform ACC Network Extra launching in the 2016–17 season. As part of the establishment of the channel, ESPN acquired Raycom Sports' previous package of games. Beginning with the 2018 ACC football season, the ACC Network branding was dropped, and the telecasts began to use the Raycom Sports branding for the final season.

Raycom Sports will continue its role as the ACC's in-house digital media partner, and ESPN will subcontract production resources from Raycom Sports for the new channel. Raycom's final syndicated ACC telecast was the 2019 ACC men's basketball tournament title game.

Raycom Sports continues to produce select ACC games, however instead of being syndicated to OTA stations, these games were first syndicated to regional sports networks. Bally Sports—the package's charter affiliate—dropped the ACC package in 2023 amid its bankruptcy. In turn, The CW acquired the package via its newly formed CW Sports division; many of that network's affiliates had previously carried the syndicated ACC Network.

== Distribution ==
=== United States ===
Upon its final season, ACC Network included:

- 35 CW affiliates (including WTTO in Birmingham, WCCT in Hartford, WTOG in Tampa, WUPA in Atlanta, WNOL in New Orleans, WKBD in Detroit, KPLR in St. Louis and KMYS in San Antonio)
- 32 MyNetworkTV affiliates (including WUXP in Nashville, WDCA in Washington, WNDY in Indianapolis, WUAB in Cleveland, and WCGV in Milwaukee)
- 20 independent stations (including WLNY in New York and KTXA in Dallas)
- 12 Fox affiliates (including WOFL in Orlando and WXIX in Cincinnati)
- 11 CBS affiliates (including WFOR in Miami, WJZ in Baltimore and WBTV in Charlotte)
- 10 NBC affiliates (including WRAL in Raleigh)
- 9 ABC affiliates (including WHAS in Louisville, WPVI in Philadelphia and WTAE in Pittsburgh)

Outside of the U.S., the telecasts could be received in Canada via historic superstations still carried on cable, such as Boston's WSBK-TV, and during its final seasons, WPCH-TV in Atlanta (the former WTBS), as well as over-the-air signals receivable in border markets.

== Programming besides live games ==
Primary source:

- ACC Football Blitz – pre-game in-studio show
- ACC Basketball Tip-off Show
- Kings of the Court

== On-air personalities ==
=== ACC Football ===
- Tim Brant – play-by-play commentator (Retired 2016)
- Dave Archer – color analyst
- Roddy Jones – sideline reporter
- Kate Whitham – host of the ACC Blitz
- Tommy Bowden – co-host/analyst on the ACC Blitz
- Tom Werme – alternate play-by-play commentator
- Renaldo Wynn – alternate color analyst

=== ACC Basketball ===
==== Play-by-play commentators ====
- Tim Brando
- Tim Brant (Retired March 2016)
- Wes Durham
- Justin Kutcher
- Steve Martin
- Bob Rathbun
- Tom Werme

==== Color analysts ====
- Cory Alexander
- Dan Bonner
- Jason Capel
- Mike Gminski
- Dave Odom

== See also ==
- American Sports Network
- ESPN+
- Southland Conference Television Network
