= 2016–17 Georgia Tech Yellow Jackets men's basketball team =

American college basketball season

2016–17 Georgia Tech Yellow Jackets men's basketball

NIT, Runner-Up
- Conference: Atlantic Coast Conference
- Record: 21–16 (8–10 ACC)
- Head coach: Josh Pastner (1st season)
- Assistant coaches: Tavaras Hardy; Darryl LaBarrie; Eric Reveno
- Home arena: McCamish Pavilion

2016–17 ACC men's basketball standings
	Conf.				Overall
Team	W		L	PCT	W		L	PCT
No. 5 North Carolina	14	–	4	.778	33	–	7	.825
No. 16 Florida State	12	–	6	.667	26	–	9	.743
No. 14 Notre Dame	12	–	6	.667	26	–	10	.722
No. 10 Louisville	12	–	6	.667	25	–	9	.735
No. 7 Duke †	11	–	7	.611	28	–	9	.757
No. 24 Virginia	11	–	7	.611	23	–	11	.676
Virginia Tech	10	–	8	.556	22	–	11	.667
Miami (FL)	10	–	8	.556	21	–	12	.636
Syracuse	10	–	8	.556	19	–	15	.559
Wake Forest	9	–	9	.500	19	–	14	.576
Georgia Tech	8	–	10	.444	21	–	16	.568
Clemson	6	–	12	.333	17	–	16	.515
NC State	0	–	14	.000	0	–	17	.000[3]
Pittsburgh	4	–	14	.222	16	–	17	.485
Boston College	2	–	16	.111	9	–	23	.281
† 2017 ACC tournament winner Rankings from AP poll

The 2016–17 Georgia Tech Yellow Jackets men's basketball team represented the Georgia Institute of Technology during the 2016–17 NCAA Division I men's basketball season. They were led by first-year head coach Josh Pastner and played their home games at Hank McCamish Pavilion as members of the Atlantic Coast Conference. They finished the season 21–16, 8–10 in ACC play to finish in 11th place. They lost in the first round of the ACC tournament to Pittsburgh. The Yellow Jackets received an invitation to the National Invitation Tournament where they defeated Indiana, Belmont, and Ole Miss to advance to the semifinals at Madison Square Garden. At MSG, they defeated Cal State Bakersfield before losing in the championship game to Texas Christian University.

== Previous season ==
The Yellow Jackets finished the 2015–16 season 21–15, 8–10 in ACC play to finish in a tie for 11th place. They defeated Clemson in the second round of the ACC tournament to advance to the quarterfinals where they lost to Virginia. They received an invitation to the National Invitation Tournament where they defeated Houston and South Carolina to advance to the quarterfinals where they lost to San Diego State.

On March 25, 2016, Georgia Tech announced Brian Gregory would not return as head coach. On April 8, 2016, the school hired Josh Pastner as head coach.

== Offseason ==
=== Departures ===
Name	Number	Pos.	Height	Weight	Year	Hometown	Notes
Charles Mitchell	0	F	6'8"	269	Senior	Marietta, GA	Graduated
Adam Smith	2	G	6'1"	170	RS Senior	Jonesboro, GA	Graduated
Marcus Georges-Hunt	3	G/F	6'5"	214	Senior	College Park, GA	Graduated
Travis Jorgenson	10	G	6'0"	177	RS Sophomore	Columbia, MO	Left the team for personal reasons
Nick Jacobs	32	F	6'8"	260	RS Senior	Atlanta, GA	Graduated
James White	33	F	6'8"	220	RS Senior	Jonesboro, GA	Graduated

=== Incoming transfers ===
Name	Number	Pos.	Height	Weight	Year	Hometown	Previous School
Jodan Price	2	G/F	6'8"	185	RS Senior	Indianapolis, IN	Transferred from Eastern Michigan. Price will be eligible to play immediately since Price graduated from Eastern Michigan.
Kellen McCormick	32	F	6'8"	215	RS Senior	West Bloomfield, MI	Transferred from Western Michigan. McCormick will be eligible to play immediately since McCormick graduated from Western Michigan.

=== 2016 recruiting class ===
College recruiting information
Name	Hometown	School	Height	Weight	Commit date
Christian Matthews #61 SF	Clinton, MD	National Christian Academy	6 ft 5 in (1.96 m)	188 lb (85 kg)	Aug 23, 2015
Christian Matthews #61 SF	Recruit ratings: Scout: Rivals: 247Sports: ESPN:				
Justin Moore #66 PG	San Diego, CA	Mission Bay High School	6 ft 4 in (1.93 m)	180 lb (82 kg)	Jun 3, 2016
Justin Moore #66 PG	Recruit ratings: Scout: Rivals: 247Sports: ESPN:				
Josh Okogie; SF	Snellville, GA	Shiloh High School	6 ft 4 in (1.93 m)	185 lb (84 kg)	Oct 13, 2015
Josh Okogie; SF	Recruit ratings: Scout: Rivals: 247Sports: ESPN:				
Overall recruit ranking:
Note: In many cases, Scout, Rivals, 247Sports, On3, and ESPN may conflict in their listings of height and weight.; In these cases, the average was taken. ESPN grades are on a 100-point scale.; Sources: "2016 Team Ranking". Rivals.

== Roster ==
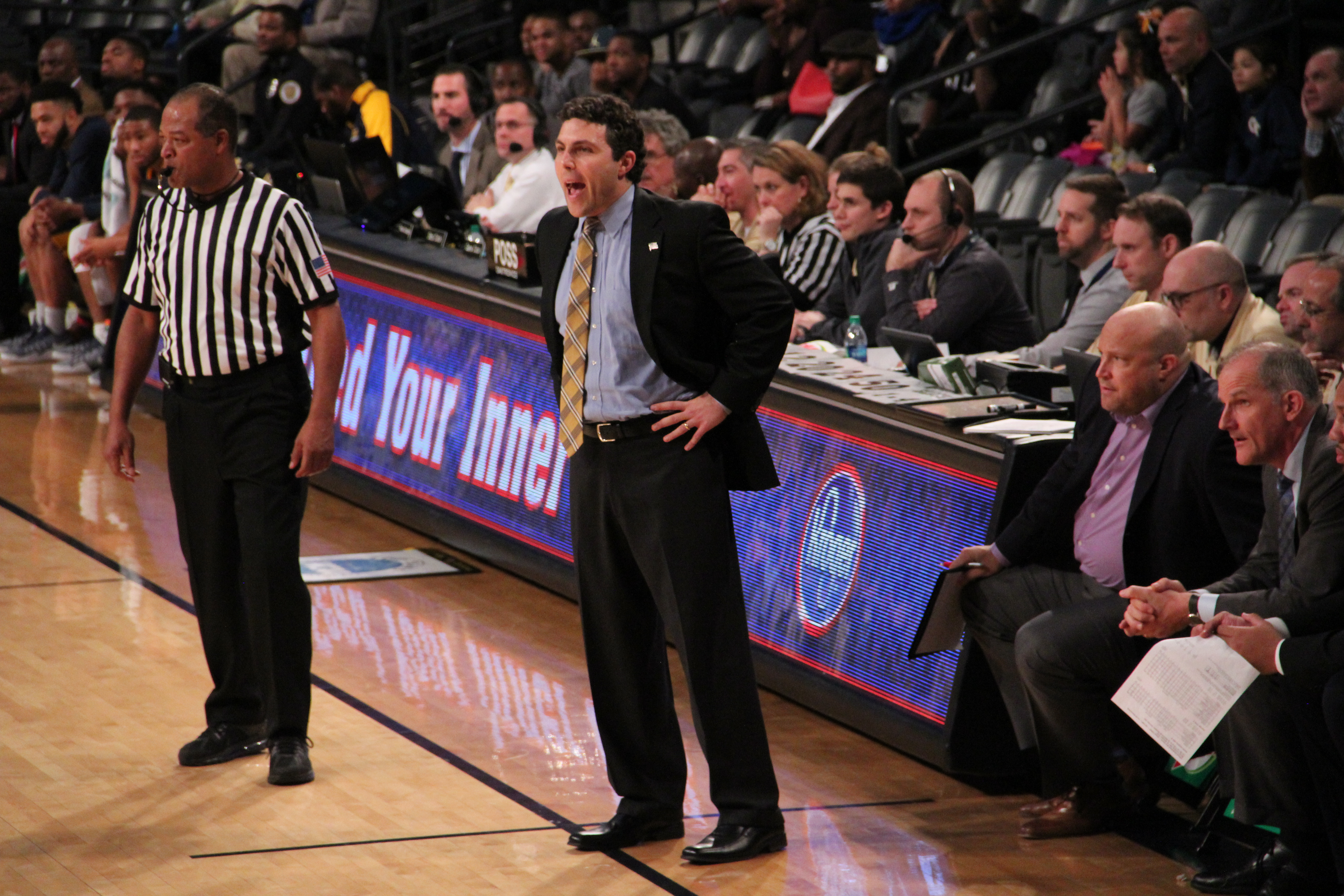
Josh Pastner

2016–17 Georgia Tech Yellow Jackets men's basketball team
Players
Coaches

Pos.	#	Name	Height	Weight	Year	Previous school	Hometown
G	0	Justin Moore	6 ft 4 in (1.93 m)	160 lb (73 kg)	Fr	Mission Bay HS	San Diego, CA
G	1	Tadric Jackson	6 ft 2 in (1.88 m)	209 lb (95 kg)	Jr	Tift County HS	Tifton, GA
G/F	2	Jodan Price	6 ft 7 in (2.01 m)	172 lb (78 kg)	RS Sr	Detroit Country Day; DePaul/Eastern Michigan	Indianapolis, IN
G	5	Josh Okogie	6 ft 5 in (1.96 m)	185 lb (84 kg)	Fr	Shiloh HS	Snellville, GA
G	11	Josh Heath	6 ft 2 in (1.88 m)	179 lb (81 kg)	Sr	Tampa Preparatory School; South Florida	Tampa, FL
F	12	Quinton Stephens	6 ft 9 in (2.06 m)	203 lb (92 kg)	Sr	Marist School	Atlanta, GA
F	23	Christian Matthews	6 ft 9 in (2.06 m)	190 lb (86 kg)	Fr	National Christian Academy	Clinton, MD
F	24	Sylvester Ogbonda	6 ft 10 in (2.08 m)	238 lb (108 kg)	RS Fr	National Christian Academy	Fort Washington, MD
G	30	Corey Heyward	6 ft 1 in (1.85 m)	210 lb (95 kg)	RS Sr	Peachtree Ridge HS; Hargrave Military Academy	Duluth, GA
F	32	Kellen McCormick	6 ft 8 in (2.03 m)	215 lb (98 kg)	RS Sr	Notre Dame Prep; Western Michigan	West Bloomfield, MI
F	34	Abdoulaye Gueye	6 ft 9 in (2.06 m)	218 lb (99 kg)	So	Central Park Christian	Dakar, Senegal
F	42	Rand Rowland	6 ft 7 in (2.01 m)	213 lb (97 kg)	Sr	White County HS	Cleveland, GA
C	44	Ben Lammers	6 ft 10 in (2.08 m)	231 lb (105 kg)	Jr	Alamo Heights High School	San Antonio, TX

Head coach

- Josh Pastner (Arizona)

Assistant coach(es)

- Tavaras Hardy (Northwestern)
- Darryl LaBarrie (Georgia Tech)
- Eric Reveno (Stanford)

Legend

- (C) Team captain
- (S) Suspended
- (I) Ineligible
- (W) Walk-on
- Injured
- Current redshirt

Roster

== Schedule and results ==
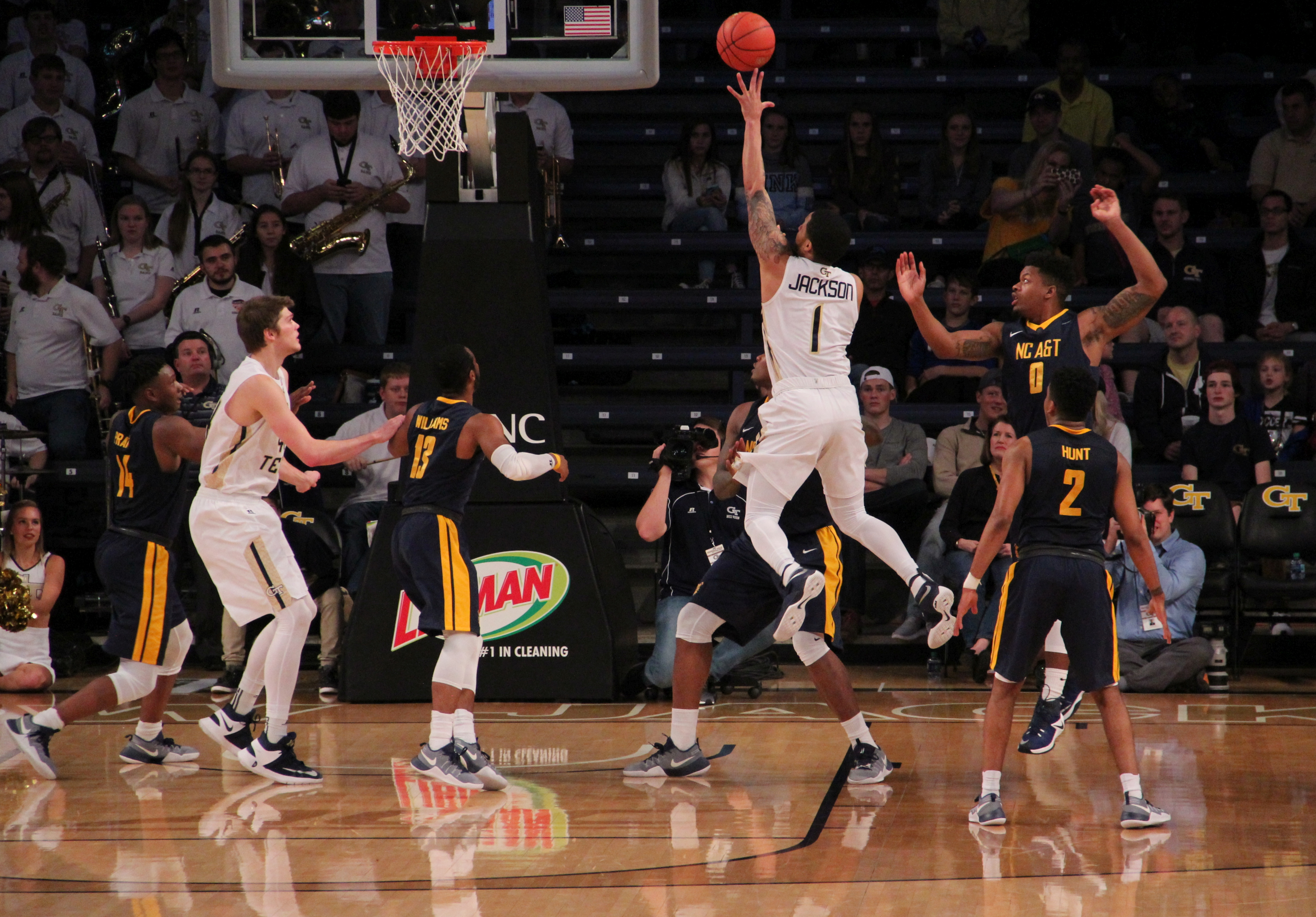
Georgia Tech in a game against North Carolina A&T

Date time, TV	Rank^{#}	Opponent^{#}	Result	Record	Site (attendance) city, state
Exhibition
11/05/2016*; 7:30 pm		Shorter	W 95–87 ^{OT}		Hank McCamish Pavilion (2,503); Atlanta, GA
Regular season
11/11/2016*; 8:00 pm, ACCN Extra		Tennessee Tech	W 70–55	1–0	Hank McCamish Pavilion (6,018); Atlanta, GA
11/14/2016*; 7:30 pm, ACCN Extra		Southern	W 77–62	2–0	Hank McCamish Pavilion (4,360); Atlanta, GA
11/18/2016*; 8:00 pm, ACCN Extra		Ohio	L 61–67	2–1	Hank McCamish Pavilion (4,802); Atlanta, GA
11/22/2016*; 7:30 pm, ACCN Extra		Sam Houston State	W 81–73	3–1	Hank McCamish Pavilion (4,181); Atlanta, GA
11/26/2016*; 7:30 pm, ACCN Extra		Tulane	W 82–68	4–1	Hank McCamish Pavilion (4,479); Atlanta, GA
11/29/2016*; 7:00 pm, ESPNU		at Penn State; ACC–Big Ten Challenge	L 60–67	4–2	Bryce Jordan Center (6,032); University Park, PA
12/03/2016*; 1:00 pm, SECN+		at Tennessee	L 58–81	4–3	Thompson–Boling Arena (12,634); Knoxville, TN
12/07/2016*; 7:00 pm, ESPNU		at VCU	W 76–73 ^{OT}	5–3	Siegel Center (7,637); Richmond, VA
12/18/2016*; 2:00 pm, ACCN Extra		Alcorn State	W 74–50	6–3	Hank McCamish Pavilion (4,599); Atlanta, GA
12/20/2016*; 7:00 pm, ESPNU		Georgia	L 43–60	6–4	Hank McCamish Pavilion (8,600); Atlanta, GA
12/22/2016*; 7:30 pm, ACCN Extra		Wofford	W 76–72	7–4	Hank McCamish Pavilion (4,725); Atlanta, GA
12/28/2016*; 7:30 pm, ACCN Extra		North Carolina A&T	W 59–52	8–4	Hank McCamish Pavilion (5,024); Atlanta, GA
12/31/2016; 12:00 pm, ACCN		No. 9 North Carolina	W 75–63	9–4 (1–0)	Hank McCamish Pavilion (7,754); Atlanta, GA
01/04/2017; 7:00 pm, ESPN2		at No. 8 Duke	L 57–110	9–5 (1–1)	Cameron Indoor Stadium (9,314); Durham, NC
01/07/2017; 2:00 pm, ACCN		No. 9 Louisville	L 50–65	9–6 (1–2)	Hank McCamish Pavilion (6,160); Atlanta, GA
01/12/2017; 7:00 pm, RSN		Clemson	W 75–63	10–6 (2–2)	Hank McCamish Pavilion (5,602); Atlanta, GA
01/15/2017; 6:30 pm, ESPNU		at NC State	W 86–76	11–6 (3–2)	PNC Arena (17,781); Raleigh, NC
01/18/2017; 9:00 pm, RSN		at Virginia Tech	L 61–62	11–7 (3–3)	Cassell Coliseum (6,598); Blacksburg, VA
01/21/2017; 2:00 pm, ACCN		at No. 16 Virginia	L 49–62	11–8 (3–4)	John Paul Jones Arena (14,459); Charlottesville, VA
01/25/2017; 7:00 pm, RSN		No. 6 Florida State	W 78–56	12–8 (4–4)	Hank McCamish Pavilion (6,542); Atlanta, GA
01/28/2017; 12:00 pm, ESPNU		No. 14 Notre Dame	W 62–60	13–8 (5–4)	Hank McCamish Pavilion (8,600); Atlanta, GA
02/01/2017; 7:00 pm, RSN		at Clemson	L 62–74	13–9 (5–5)	Littlejohn Coliseum (7,530); Clemson, SC
02/04/2017; 3:00 pm, RSN		at Wake Forest	L 69–81	13–10 (5–6)	LJVM Coliseum (10,962); Winston-Salem, NC
02/07/2017*; 7:30 pm, ACCN Extra		Tusculum	W 96–58	14–10	Hank McCamish Pavilion (2,437); Atlanta, GA
02/11/2017; 5:30 pm, RSN		Boston College	W 65–54	15–10 (6–6)	Hank McCamish Pavilion (7,391); Atlanta, GA
02/15/2017; 8:00 pm, ACCN		at Miami (FL)	L 61–70	15–11 (6–7)	BankUnited Center (7,111); Coral Gables, FL
02/19/2017; 6:30 pm, ESPNU		Syracuse	W 71–65	16–11 (7–7)	Hank McCamish Pavilion (8,600); Atlanta, GA
02/21/2017; 8:00 pm, ACCN		NC State	L 69–71	16–12 (7–8)	Hank McCamish Pavilion (6,950); Atlanta, GA
02/26/2017; 6:30 pm, ESPNU		at No. 21 Notre Dame	L 60–64	16–13 (7–9)	Edmund P. Joyce Center (9,149); South Bend, IN
02/28/2017; 9:00 pm, ESPNU		Pittsburgh	W 61–52	17–13 (8–9)	Hank McCamish Pavilion (7,185); Atlanta, GA
03/04/2017; 4:00 pm, ACCN		at Syracuse	L 61–90	17–14 (8–10)	Carrier Dome (30,448); Syracuse, NY
ACC Tournament
03/08/2017; 7:00 pm, ESPNU/ACCN	(11)	vs. (14) Pittsburgh; First Round	L 59–61	17–15	Barclays Center (8,656); Brooklyn, NY
NIT
03/14/2017*; 9:00 pm, ESPN	(6)	(3) Indiana; First Round – Syracuse Bracket	W 75–63	18–15	Hank McCamish Pavilion (5,533); Atlanta, GA
3/19/2017*; 12:00 pm, ESPN	(6)	(7) Belmont; Second Round – Syracuse Bracket	W 71–57	19–15	Hank McCamish Pavilion (7,176); Atlanta, GA
3/21/2017*; 9:00 pm, ESPN2	(6)	at (5) Ole Miss; Quarterfinals – Syracuse Bracket	W 74–66	20–15	The Pavilion at Ole Miss (9,091); Oxford, MS
3/28/2017*; 7:00 pm, ESPN	(6)	vs. (8) Cal State Bakersfield; Semifinals	W 76–61	21–15	Madison Square Garden (5,210); New York City, NY
3/30/2017*; 8:00 pm, ESPN	(6)	vs. (4) TCU; Championship	L 56–88	21–16	Madison Square Garden (5,029); New York City, NY
*Non-conference game. ^{#}Rankings from AP Poll. (#) Tournament seedings in parentheses. All times are in Eastern Time.
