= 2016–17 Wake Forest Demon Deacons men's basketball team =

American college basketball season

2016–17 Wake Forest Demon Deacons men's basketball

NCAA tournament, First Four
- Conference: Atlantic Coast Conference
- Record: 19–14 (9–9 ACC)
- Head coach: Danny Manning (3rd season)
- Assistant coaches: Steve Woodberry; Randolph Childress; Brett Ballard
- Home arena: LJVM Coliseum

2016–17 ACC men's basketball standings
	Conf.				Overall
Team	W		L	PCT	W		L	PCT
No. 5 North Carolina	14	–	4	.778	33	–	7	.825
No. 16 Florida State	12	–	6	.667	26	–	9	.743
No. 14 Notre Dame	12	–	6	.667	26	–	10	.722
No. 10 Louisville	12	–	6	.667	25	–	9	.735
No. 7 Duke †	11	–	7	.611	28	–	9	.757
No. 24 Virginia	11	–	7	.611	23	–	11	.676
Virginia Tech	10	–	8	.556	22	–	11	.667
Miami (FL)	10	–	8	.556	21	–	12	.636
Syracuse	10	–	8	.556	19	–	15	.559
Wake Forest	9	–	9	.500	19	–	14	.576
Georgia Tech	8	–	10	.444	21	–	16	.568
Clemson	6	–	12	.333	17	–	16	.515
NC State	0	–	14	.000	0	–	17	.000[3]
Pittsburgh	4	–	14	.222	16	–	17	.485
Boston College	2	–	16	.111	9	–	23	.281
† 2017 ACC tournament winner Rankings from AP poll

The 2016–17 Wake Forest Demon Deacons men's basketball team represented Wake Forest University during the 2016–17 NCAA Division I men's basketball season. The Demon Deacons were led by third-year head coach Danny Manning. The team played their home games at the Lawrence Joel Veterans Memorial Coliseum in Winston-Salem, North Carolina as a member of the Atlantic Coast Conference. They finished the season 19–14, 9–9 in ACC play to finish in tenth place. They defeated Boston College in the first round of the ACC tournament to advance to the second round where they lost to Virginia Tech. They received an at-large bid to the NCAA tournament as a No. 11 seed in the South region. There they lost in the First Four to Kansas State.

== Previous season ==
The Demon Deacons finished 2015–16 season 11–20, 2–16 in ACC play to finish in 14th place. They lost to NC State in the first round of the ACC tournament.

== Offseason ==
=== Departures ===
Name	Number	Pos.	Height	Weight	Year	Hometown	Reason left
Codi Miller-McIntyre	0	G	6'3"	205	Senior	Concord, NC	Graduated
Madison Jones	1	G	6'1"	165	Senior	Raleigh, NC	Suspended; transferred to Seton Hall
Devin Thomas	2	F	6'9"	255	Senior	Harrisburg, PA	Graduated
Rondale Watson	23	G	6'3"	190	Sophomore	Lewisburg, WV	Transferred to Marshall
Cornelius Hudson	25	F	6'6"	180	Sophomore	Dallas, TX	Dismissed from the team due to team violations
Andre Washington	31	C	7'0"	240	Senior	Roanoke, VA	Graduate transferred to East Carolina
Stephen Prendergast	35	G	6'1"	175	Senior	Mahwah, NJ	Walk-on; graduated
Gilbert McGregor	42	F	6'4"	195	RS Junior	New Orleans, LA	Walk-on; didn't return
Britton ANderson	52	G	6'4"	190	Freshman	Great Falls, VA	Walk-on; didn't return

=== Incoming transfers ===
Name	Number	Pos.	Height	Weight	Year	Hometown	Previous School
Austin Arians	34	F	6'6"	200	RS Senior	Stoughton, WI	Transferred from Milwaukee. Will be eligible to play immediately since Arians graduated from UW–Milwaukee.

=== 2016 recruiting class ===
College recruiting information
Name	Hometown	School	Height	Weight	Commit date
Brandon Childress #27 PG	Winston-Salem, NC	Wesleyan Christian Academy	6 ft 0 in (1.83 m)	170 lb (77 kg)	Oct 25, 2014
Brandon Childress #27 PG	Recruit ratings: Scout: Rivals: 247Sports: ESPN:				
Richard Washington Jr. #28 SF	Newport News, VA	Walsingham Academy	6 ft 5 in (1.96 m)	175 lb (79 kg)	Aug 1, 2015
Richard Washington Jr. #28 SF	Recruit ratings: Scout: Rivals: 247Sports: ESPN:				
Samuel Japhet-Mathias; C	London, England	City of London Academy	6 ft 11 in (2.11 m)	240 lb (110 kg)	Sep 29, 2015
Samuel Japhet-Mathias; C	Recruit ratings: Scout: Rivals: 247Sports: ESPN:				
D. J. Mitchell #77 PF	Fresno, CA	Buchanan High School	6 ft 7 in (2.01 m)	185 lb (84 kg)	Sep 12, 2015
D. J. Mitchell #77 PF	Recruit ratings: Scout: Rivals: 247Sports: ESPN:				
Overall recruit ranking:
Note: In many cases, Scout, Rivals, 247Sports, On3, and ESPN may conflict in their listings of height and weight.; In these cases, the average was taken. ESPN grades are on a 100-point scale.; Sources: "2016 Team Ranking". Rivals.

=== 2017 recruiting class ===
College recruiting information (2017)
Name	Hometown	School	Height	Weight	Commit date
Melo Eggleston; SF	Washington, D.C.	Clinton Christian School	6 ft 8 in (2.03 m)	187 lb (85 kg)	Apr 25, 2016
Melo Eggleston; SF	Recruit ratings: Scout: Rivals: 247Sports: ESPN:				
Chaundee Brown; SG	Orlando, FL	The First Academy	6 ft 5 in (1.96 m)	195 lb (88 kg)	Oct 2, 2016
Chaundee Brown; SG	Recruit ratings: Scout: Rivals: 247Sports: ESPN:				
Olivier Sarr; C	Paris, FR	INSEP Paris	6 ft 11 in (2.11 m)	225 lb (102 kg)	Apr 12, 2017
Olivier Sarr; C	Recruit ratings: Scout: Rivals: 247Sports: ESPN:				
Overall recruit ranking:
Note: In many cases, Scout, Rivals, 247Sports, On3, and ESPN may conflict in their listings of height and weight.; In these cases, the average was taken. ESPN grades are on a 100-point scale.; Sources: "2017 Team Ranking". Rivals.

== Roster ==
2016–17 Wake Forest Demon Deacons men's basketball team
Players
Coaches

Pos.	#	Name	Height	Weight	Year	Previous school	Hometown
G	0	Brandon Childress	6 ft 0 in (1.83 m)	170 lb (77 kg)	Fr	Wesleyan Christian Academy	Winston-Salem, NC
G	1	Keyshawn Woods	6 ft 3 in (1.91 m)	182 lb (83 kg)	RS So	Northside Christian Academy; Charlotte	Gastonia, NC
F	2	D. J. Mitchell	6 ft 8 in (2.03 m)	200 lb (91 kg)	Fr	Buchanan	Clovis, CA
C	4	Doral Moore	7 ft 1 in (2.16 m)	265 lb (120 kg)	So	Montverde Academy	Locust Grove, GA
G	10	Mitchell Wilbekin	6 ft 2 in (1.88 m)	175 lb (79 kg)	Jr	The Rock School	Gainesville, FL
G	11	Greg McClinton	6 ft 7 in (2.01 m)	200 lb (91 kg)	RS Jr	Hargrave Military Academy	Winston-Salem, NC
G	13	Bryant Crawford	6 ft 3 in (1.91 m)	200 lb (91 kg)	So	Gonzaga College HS	Kensington, MD
F	20	John Collins	6 ft 10 in (2.08 m)	225 lb (102 kg)	So	Cardinal Newman HS	West Palm Beach, FL
C	25	Sam Japhet-Mathias	6 ft 11 in (2.11 m)	275 lb (125 kg)	Fr	City of London Academy	London, England
F	33	Rich Washington	6 ft 6 in (1.98 m)	175 lb (79 kg)	Fr	Walsingham Academy	Williamsburg, VA
F	34	Austin Arians	6 ft 6 in (1.98 m)	200 lb (91 kg)	RS Sr	Edgewood	Stoughton, WI
G	40	Anthony Bilas (W)	6 ft 2 in (1.88 m)	165 lb (75 kg)	So	Charlotte Latin School	Charlotte, NC
G	43	Trent VanHorn	6 ft 3 in (1.91 m)	215 lb (98 kg)	Sr	Canterbury School	Fort Wayne, IN
F	44	Konstantinos Mitoglou	6 ft 10 in (2.08 m)	245 lb (111 kg)	Jr	Aristotle University of Thessaloniki	Thessaloniki, Greece
F	45	Troy Rike (W)	6 ft 7 in (2.01 m)	205 lb (93 kg)	Jr	St. Ignatius College Preparatory	San Francisco, CA
G	52	Britton Anderson (W)	6 ft 4 in (1.93 m)	185 lb (84 kg)	Jr	Flint Hill School	Great Falls, VA

Head coach

- Danny Manning (Kansas)

Assistant coach(es)

- Steve Woodberry (Kansas)
- Randolph Childress (Wake Forest)
- Brett Ballard (Kansas)

Legend

- (C) Team captain
- (S) Suspended
- (I) Ineligible
- (W) Walk-on
- Injured
- Current redshirt

Roster

== Schedule and results ==
Date time, TV	Rank^{#}	Opponent^{#}	Result	Record	Site city, state
Non-conference regular season
11/11/2016*; 7:30 pm, ACCN Extra		Radford	W 80–59	1–0	LJVM Coliseum (7,233); Winston-Salem, NC
11/13/2016*; 2:00 pm, ACCN Extra		Bucknell	W 94–74	2–0	LJVM Coliseum (6,541); Winston-Salem, NC
11/17/2016*; 2:00 pm, ESPN3		vs. UTEP; Charleston Classic quarterfinals	W 103–81	3–0	TD Arena (4,125); Charleston, SC
11/18/2016*; 1:30 pm, ESPN2		vs. No. 3 Villanova; Charleston Classic semifinals	L 77–96	3–1	TD Arena (4,020); Charleston, SC
11/20/2016*; 7:00 pm, ESPNU		vs. College of Charleston; Charleston Classic 3rd place game	W 78–61	4–1	TD Arena (4,325); Charleston, SC
11/23/2016*; 7:30 pm, ACCN Extra		Coastal Carolina	W 86–74	5–1	LJVM Coliseum (6,867); Winston-Salem, NC
11/28/2016*; 9:00 pm, ESPNU		at Northwestern; ACC–Big Ten Challenge	L 58–65	5–2	Welsh-Ryan Arena (6,386); Evansville, IN
12/03/2016*; 12:00 pm, ESPNU		at Richmond	W 75–67	6–2	Robins Center (6,705); Richmond, VA
12/06/2016*; 7:00 pm, ACCN Extra		Charlotte	W 91–74	7–2	LJVM Coliseum (6,791); Winston-Salem, NC
12/09/2016*; 7:00 pm, ESPN3		at UNC Greensboro	W 78–75	8–2	Greensboro Coliseum Complex (3,607); Greensboro, NC
12/17/2016*; 8:00 pm, FS1		at No. 17 Xavier; Skip Prosser Classic	L 65–69	8–3	Cintas Center (10,407); Cincinnati, OH
12/22/2016*; 9:00 pm, ESPNU		LSU	W 110–76	9–3	LJVM Coliseum (9,643); Winston-Salem, NC
ACC regular season
12/28/2016; 5:00 pm, ESPN2		at No. 20 Florida State	L 72–88	9–4 (0–1)	Donald L. Tucker Civic Center (8,873); Tallahassee, FL
12/31/2016; 12:00 pm, RSN		Clemson	L 68–73	9–5 (0–2)	LJVM Coliseum (10,034); Winston-Salem, NC
01/03/2017; 12:00 pm, RSN		Boston College	W 79–66	10–5 (1–2)	LJVM Coliseum (7,708); Winston-Salem, NC
01/08/2017; 8:00 pm, ESPNU		at No. 11 Virginia	L 62–79	10–6 (1–3)	John Paul Jones Arena (13,717); Charlottesville, VA
01/11/2017; 8:00 pm, ESPN2		No. 11 North Carolina	L 87–93	10–7 (1–4)	LJVM Coliseum (13,159); Winston-Salem, NC
01/18/2017; 8:00 pm, ACCN		Miami (FL)	W 96–79	11–7 (2–4)	LJVM Coliseum (9,691); Winston-Salem, NC
01/21/2017; 2:00 pm, ACCN		at NC State	W 93–88	12–7 (3–4)	PNC Arena (18,823); Raleigh, NC
01/24/2017; 8:00 pm, ACCN		at Syracuse	L 76-81	12–8 (3–5)	Carrier Dome (22,262); Syracuse, NY
01/28/2017; 3:00 pm, ACCN		No. 17 Duke	L 83–85	12–9 (3–6)	LJVM Coliseum (14,681); Winston-Salem, NC
01/31/2017; 7:00 pm, ESPNU		at Boston College	W 85–80	13–9 (4–6)	Conte Forum (3,751); Chestnut Hill, MA
02/04/2017; 3:00 pm, RSN		Georgia Tech	W 81–69	14–9 (5–6)	LJVM Coliseum (10,962); Winston-Salem, NC
02/07/2017; 7:00 pm, ESPNews		at Notre Dame	L 81–88	14–10 (5–7)	Edmund P. Joyce Center (8,851); South Bend, IN
02/11/2017; 12:00 pm, RSN		NC State	W 88–58	15–10 (6–7)	LJVM Coliseum (12,935); Winston-Salem, NC
02/14/2016; 7:00 pm, RSN		at Clemson	L 83–95	15–11 (6–8)	Littlejohn Coliseum (6,929); Clemson, SC
02/18/2017; 1:00 pm, ACCN		at No. 12 Duke	L 94–99	15–12 (6–9)	Cameron Indoor Stadium (9,314); Durham, NC
02/22/2017; 7:00 pm, RSN		Pittsburgh	W 63–59	16–12 (7–9)	LJVM Coliseum (9,827); Winston-Salem, NC
03/01/2017; 9:00 pm, RSN		No. 8 Louisville	W 88–81	17–12 (8–9)	LJVM Coliseum (11,488); Winston-Salem, NC
03/04/2017; 4:30 pm, RSN		at Virginia Tech	W 89–84	18–12 (9–9)	Cassell Coliseum; Blacksburg, VA
ACC tournament
March 7, 2017; 2:00 pm, ESPN2	(10)	vs. (15) Boston College; First Round	W 92–78	19–12	Barclays Center (8,656); Brooklyn, NY
March 8, 2017; 7:00 pm, ESPN2	(10)	vs. (7) Virginia Tech; Second Round	L 90–99	19–13	Barclays Center (17,732); Brooklyn, NY
NCAA tournament
March 14, 2017*; 9:10 pm, truTV	(11 S)	vs. (11 S) Kansas State; First Four	L 88–95	19–14	UD Arena (11,855); Dayton, OH
*Non-conference game. ^{#}Rankings from AP Poll. (#) Tournament seedings in parentheses. S=South Region. All times are in Eastern Time..
