= 2016–17 Notre Dame Fighting Irish men's basketball team =

American college basketball season

2016–17 Notre Dame Fighting Irish men's basketball

Legends Classic champions

NCAA tournament, Second Round
- Conference: Atlantic Coast Conference

Ranking
- Coaches: No. 20
- AP: No. 14
- Record: 26–10 (12–6 ACC)
- Head coach: Mike Brey (17th season)
- Assistant coaches: Rod Balanis; Ryan Ayers; Ryan Humphrey
- Home arena: Edmund P. Joyce Center

2016–17 ACC men's basketball standings
	Conf.				Overall
Team	W		L	PCT	W		L	PCT
No. 5 North Carolina	14	–	4	.778	33	–	7	.825
No. 16 Florida State	12	–	6	.667	26	–	9	.743
No. 14 Notre Dame	12	–	6	.667	26	–	10	.722
No. 10 Louisville	12	–	6	.667	25	–	9	.735
No. 7 Duke †	11	–	7	.611	28	–	9	.757
No. 24 Virginia	11	–	7	.611	23	–	11	.676
Virginia Tech	10	–	8	.556	22	–	11	.667
Miami (FL)	10	–	8	.556	21	–	12	.636
Syracuse	10	–	8	.556	19	–	15	.559
Wake Forest	9	–	9	.500	19	–	14	.576
Georgia Tech	8	–	10	.444	21	–	16	.568
Clemson	6	–	12	.333	17	–	16	.515
NC State	0	–	14	.000	0	–	17	.000[3]
Pittsburgh	4	–	14	.222	16	–	17	.485
Boston College	2	–	16	.111	9	–	23	.281
† 2017 ACC tournament winner Rankings from AP poll

The 2016–17 Notre Dame Fighting Irish men's basketball team represented the University of Notre Dame during the 2016–17 NCAA Division I men's basketball season. The Fighting Irish, led by 17th-year head coach Mike Brey, played their home games at Edmund P. Joyce Center in South Bend, Indiana as fourth-year members of the Atlantic Coast Conference. They finished the season 26–10, 12–6 in ACC play to finish in a three-way tie for second place. They defeated Virginia and Florida State to advance to the championship game of the ACC tournament where they lost to Duke. They received an at-large bid to the NCAA tournament as the No. 5 seed in the West Region. There they defeated No. 12 seed Princeton in the First Round before losing in the Second Round where they lost to No. 4 seed West Virginia.

== Previous season ==
The Fighting Irish finished the 2015–16 season 24–12, 11–7 in ACC play to finish in a tie for fifth place. They defeated Duke in the quarterfinals of the ACC tournament before losing in the semifinals to North Carolina. They received an at-large bid to the NCAA tournament where they defeated Michigan, Stephen F. Austin, and Wisconsin to advance to the Elite Eight. There they lost to fellow ACC member North Carolina.

== Offseason ==
=== Departures ===
Name	Number	Pos.	Height	Weight	Year	Hometown	Notes
Demetrius Jackson	11	G	6'1"	201	Junior	Mishawaka, IN	Declare for 2016 NBA draft
Austin Burgett	20	F	6'9"	232	Senior	Avon, IN	Graduated
Zach Auguste	30	F	6'10"	245	Senior	Marlborough, MA	Graduated

=== 2016 recruiting class ===
College recruiting
Name	Hometown	School	Height	Weight	Commit date
T. J. Gibbs; SG	Scotch Plains, NJ	Seton Hall Prep	6 ft 2 in (1.88 m)	180 lb (82 kg)	May 4, 2015
T. J. Gibbs; SG	Recruit ratings: Scout: Rivals: 247Sports: ESPN:				
John Mooney #36 PF	Altamonte Springs, FL	Lake Brantley High School	6 ft 9 in (2.06 m)	240 lb (110 kg)	Sep 7, 2015
John Mooney #36 PF	Recruit ratings: Scout: Rivals: 247Sports: ESPN:				
Nikola Djogo; SG	Stoney Creek, ON	Athlete Institute Basketball Academy	6 ft 7 in (2.01 m)	185 lb (84 kg)	Oct 14, 2015
Nikola Djogo; SG	Recruit ratings: Scout: Rivals: 247Sports: ESPN:				
Overall recruit ranking: Scout: 15 Rivals: 20 ESPN: 17
Note: In many cases, Scout, Rivals, 247Sports, On3, and ESPN may conflict in their listings of height and weight.; In these cases, the average was taken. ESPN grades are on a 100-point scale.; Sources: "Notre Dame 2016 Basketball Commitments". Rivals.; "2016 Notre Dame Commits". Scout.; "2016 Player Commitments – Notre Dame". ESPN.; "Scout.com Team Recruiting Rankings". Scout.; "2016 Team Ranking". Rivals.

=== 2017 Recruiting class ===
College recruiting (2017)
Name	Hometown	School	Height	Weight	Commit date
D. J. Harvey; SF	Bowie, MD	DeMatha Catholic High School	6 ft 6 in (1.98 m)	185 lb (84 kg)	Sep 20, 2016
D. J. Harvey; SF	Recruit ratings: Scout: Rivals: 247Sports: ESPN:				
Overall recruit ranking:
Note: In many cases, Scout, Rivals, 247Sports, On3, and ESPN may conflict in their listings of height and weight.; In these cases, the average was taken. ESPN grades are on a 100-point scale.; Sources: "Notre Dame 2017 Basketball Commitments". Rivals.; "2017 Team Ranking". Rivals.

== Roster ==
2016–17 Notre Dame Fighting Irish men's basketball team
Players
Coaches

Pos.	#	Name	Height	Weight	Year	Previous school	Hometown
G	0	Rex Pflueger	6 ft 6 in (1.98 m)	202 lb (92 kg)	So	Mater Dei	Dana Point, California
F	1	Austin Torres	6 ft 7 in (2.01 m)	231 lb (105 kg)	RS Jr	Penn	Granger, Indiana
G	2	T. J. Gibbs	6 ft 3 in (1.91 m)	200 lb (91 kg)	Fr	Seton Hall Prep	Scotch Plains, New Jersey
C	3	V. J. Beachem	6 ft 8 in (2.03 m)	201 lb (91 kg)	Sr	New Haven	Fort Wayne, Indiana
F	4	Matt Ryan	6 ft 7 in (2.01 m)	228 lb (103 kg)	So	Iona Preparatory	Cortlandt Manor, New York
G	5	Matt Farrell	6 ft 1 in (1.85 m)	178 lb (81 kg)	Jr	Point Pleasant Beach	Point Pleasant, New Jersey
F	12	Elijah Burns	6 ft 8 in (2.03 m)	235 lb (107 kg)	RS Fr	Blair Academy	Troy, New York
G	13	Nikola Djogo (redshirt)	6 ft 7 in (2.01 m)	211 lb (96 kg)	Fr	Athlete Institute Prep	Hamilton, Ontario
F	21	Matt Gregory (W)	6 ft 6 in (1.98 m)	201 lb (91 kg)	Jr	Cathedral	Avon, Indiana
F	23	Martinas Geben	6 ft 10 in (2.08 m)	255 lb (116 kg)	Jr	St. Maria Goretti	Vilnius, Lithuania
F	30	Patrick Mazza (W)	6 ft 10 in (2.08 m)	255 lb (116 kg)	RS Sr	Glenbard West	Glen Ellyn, IL
G	32	Steve Vasturia	6 ft 5 in (1.96 m)	212 lb (96 kg)	Sr	St. Joseph's Prep	Medford, New Jersey
F	33	John Mooney	6 ft 9 in (2.06 m)	245 lb (111 kg)	Fr	Lake Brantley	Orlando, Florida
F	35	Bonzie Colson	6 ft 5 in (1.96 m)	225 lb (102 kg)	Jr	St. Andrew's School	New Bedford, Massachusetts

Head coach

- Mike Brey (George Washington)

Assistant coach(es)

- Rod Balanis (Georgia Tech)
- Ryan Ayers (Notre Dame)
- Ryan Humphrey (Notre Dame)

Legend

- (C) Team captain
- (S) Suspended
- (I) Ineligible
- (W) Walk-on
- Injured
- Current redshirt

Roster

== Schedule and results ==
Date time, TV	Rank^{#}	Opponent^{#}	Result	Record	Site (attendance) city, state
Exhibition
Nov 1, 2016*; 7:00 pm, ACCN Extra		Mercy	W 119–58		Edmund P. Joyce Center (6,071); South Bend, IN
Nov 7, 2016*; 7:00 pm, ACCN Extra		Catholic	W 103–48		Edmund P. Joyce Center (5,494); South Bend, IN
Non-conference regular season
Nov 12, 2016*; 12:00 pm, ACCN Extra		Bryant; Legends Classic	W 89–64	1–0	Edmund P. Joyce Center (7,064); South Bend, IN
Nov 16, 2016*; 7:00 pm, ACCN Extra		Seattle; Legends Classic	W 92–49	2–0	Edmund P. Joyce Center (6,598); South Bend, IN
Nov 18, 2016*; 7:00 pm, ACCN Extra		Loyola (MD)	W 83–48	3–0	Edmund P. Joyce Center (8,894); South Bend, IN
Nov 21, 2016*; 7:00 pm, ESPN2		vs. Colorado; Legends Classic semifinals	W 89–83	4–0	Barclays Center (6,780); Brooklyn, NY
Nov 22, 2016*; 6:00 pm, ESPN2		vs. Northwestern; Legends Classic finals	W 70–66	5–0	Barclays Center (5,711); Brooklyn, NY
Nov 26, 2016*; 7:00 pm, ACCN Extra		Chicago State	W 91–60	6–0	Edmund P. Joyce Center (6,804); South Bend, IN
Nov 29, 2016*; 9:00 pm, ESPN2		Iowa; ACC–Big Ten Challenge	W 92–78	7–0	Edmund P. Joyce Center (7,660); South Bend, IN
Dec 4, 2016*; 5:00 pm, ACCN Extra		North Carolina A&T	W 107–53	8–0	Edmund P. Joyce Center (7,801); South Bend, IN
Dec 6, 2016*; 9:00 pm, ESPNU	No. 23	Fort Wayne	W 87–72	9–0	Edmund P. Joyce Center (7,204); South Bend, IN
Dec 10, 2016*; 12:00 pm, CBS	No. 23	vs. No. 1 Villanova; Never Forget Tribute Classic	L 66–74	9–1	Prudential Center (18,722); Newark, NJ
Dec 17, 2016*; 2:00 pm, ESPN2	No. 21	vs. No. 15 Purdue; Crossroads Classic	L 81–86	9–2	Bankers Life Fieldhouse; Indianapolis, IN
Dec 19, 2016*; 7:00 pm, ACCN Extra	No. 25	Colgate	W 77–62	10–2	Edmund P. Joyce Center (6,817); South Bend, IN
Dec 28, 2016*; 7:00 pm, ACCN Extra	No. 24	Saint Peter's	W 63–55	11–2	Edmund P. Joyce Center (6,731); South Bend, IN
ACC Regular season
Dec 31, 2016; 2:00 pm, ACCN	No. 24	at Pittsburgh	W 78–77 ^{OT}	12–2 (1–0)	Petersen Events Center (10,131); Pittsburgh, PA
Jan 4, 2017; 9:00 pm, ACCN	No. 23	No. 9 Louisville	W 77–70	13–2 (2–0)	Edmund P. Joyce Center (8,420); South Bend, IN
Jan 7, 2017; 3:00 pm, ESPNU	No. 23	Clemson	W 75–70	14–2 (3–0)	Edmund P. Joyce Center (8,311); South Bend, IN
Jan 12, 2017; 7:00 pm, ESPN	No. 20	at Miami (FL)	W 67–62	15–2 (4–0)	BankUnited Center (7,972); Coral Gables, FL
Jan 14, 2017; 2:00 pm, ACCN	No. 20	at Virginia Tech	W 76–71	16–2 (5–0)	Cassell Coliseum (9,567); Blacksburg, VA
Jan 18, 2017; 7:00 pm, ACCRSN	No. 15	at No. 10 Florida State	L 80–83	16–3 (5–1)	Donald L. Tucker Civic Center (10,535); Tallahassee, FL
Jan 21, 2017; 12:00 pm, ESPN	No. 15	Syracuse	W 84–66	17–3 (6–1)	Edmund P. Joyce Center (9,149); South Bend, IN
Jan 24, 2017; 8:00 pm, ACCN	No. 14	No. 12 Virginia	L 54–71	17–4 (6–2)	Edmund P. Joyce Center (9,149); South Bend, IN
Jan 28, 2017; 12:00 pm, ESPNU	No. 14	at Georgia Tech	L 60–62	17–5 (6–3)	Hank McCamish Pavilion (8,600); Atlanta, GA
Jan 30, 2017; 7:00 pm, ESPN	No. 20	No. 21 Duke	L 74–84	17–6 (6–4)	Edmund P. Joyce Center (9,149); South Bend, IN
Feb 5, 2017; 1:00 pm, ESPNews	No. 20	vs. No. 12 North Carolina	L 76–83	17–7 (6–5)	Greensboro Coliseum (17,051); Greensboro, NC
Feb 7, 2017; 7:00 pm, ESPNews		Wake Forest	W 88–81	18–7 (7–5)	Edmund P. Joyce Center (8,851); South Bend, IN
Feb 11, 2017; 6:00 pm, ESPN		No. 14 Florida State	W 84–72	19–7 (8–5)	Edmund P. Joyce Center (9,149); South Bend, IN
Feb 14, 2017; 7:00 pm, ESPNU	No. 25	at Boston College	W 84–76	20–7 (9–5)	Conte Forum (4,321); Chestnut Hill, MA
Feb 18, 2017; 12:00 pm, ESPN	No. 25	at NC State	W 81–72	21–7 (10–5)	PNC Arena (16,602); Raleigh, NC
Feb 26, 2017; 6:30 pm, ESPNU	No. 21	Georgia Tech	W 64–60	22–7 (11–5)	Edmund P. Joyce Center (9,149); South Bend, IN
Mar 1, 2017; 8:00 pm, ACCN	No. 19	Boston College	W 82–66	23–7 (12–5)	Edmund P. Joyce Center (9,028); South Bend, IN
Mar 4, 2017; 2:00 pm, CBS	No. 19	at No. 8 Louisville	L 64–71	23–8 (12–6)	KFC Yum! Center (22,612); Louisville, KY
ACC Tournament
Mar 9, 2017; 9:00 pm, ESPN	(3) No. 22	vs. (6) No. 21 Virginia; Quarterfinals	W 71–58	24–8	Barclays Center (17,732); Brooklyn, NY
Mar 10, 2017; 9:00 pm, ESPN	(3) No. 22	vs. (2) No. 16 Florida State; Semifinals	W 77–73	25–8	Barclays Center (18,109); Brooklyn, NY
Mar 11, 2017; 9:00 pm, ESPN	(3) No. 22	vs. (5) No. 14 Duke; Championship	L 69–75	25–9	Barclays Center (18,109); Brooklyn, NY
NCAA tournament
Mar 16, 2017*; 12:15 pm, CBS	(5 W) No. 14	vs. (12 W) Princeton; First Round	W 60–58	26–9	KeyBank Center (17,806); Buffalo, NY
Mar 18, 2017*; 12:10 pm, CBS	(5 W) No. 14	vs. (4 W) No. 13 West Virginia; Second Round	L 71–83	26–10	KeyBank Center (19,261); Buffalo, NY
*Non-conference game. ^{#}Rankings from AP Poll. (#) Tournament seedings in parentheses. W=West. All times are in Eastern Time. Source:

== Rankings ==
Ranking movements Legend: ██ Increase in ranking ██ Decrease in ranking — = Not ranked RV = Received votes
	Week																			
Poll	Pre	1	2	3	4	5	6	7	8	9	10	11	12	13	14	15	16	17	18	Final
AP	—	—	—	—	23	21	25	24	23	20	15	14	20	RV	25	21	19	22	14	Not released
Coaches	—	—	—	—	22	21	24	24	21	20	15	12	18	24	20	17	13	16	14	20

*AP does not release post-NCAA tournament rankings
