= 2016–17 Pittsburgh Panthers men's basketball team =

American college basketball season

2016–17 Pittsburgh Panthers men's basketball
- Conference: Atlantic Coast Conference
- Record: 16–17 (4–14 ACC)
- Head coach: Kevin Stallings (1st season)
- Assistant coaches: Tom Richardson (1st season); Kevin Sutton (1st season); Jeremy Ballard (1st season)
- Home arena: Petersen Events Center (Capacity: 12,508)

2016–17 ACC men's basketball standings
	Conf.				Overall
Team	W		L	PCT	W		L	PCT
No. 5 North Carolina	14	–	4	.778	33	–	7	.825
No. 16 Florida State	12	–	6	.667	26	–	9	.743
No. 14 Notre Dame	12	–	6	.667	26	–	10	.722
No. 10 Louisville	12	–	6	.667	25	–	9	.735
No. 7 Duke †	11	–	7	.611	28	–	9	.757
No. 24 Virginia	11	–	7	.611	23	–	11	.676
Virginia Tech	10	–	8	.556	22	–	11	.667
Miami (FL)	10	–	8	.556	21	–	12	.636
Syracuse	10	–	8	.556	19	–	15	.559
Wake Forest	9	–	9	.500	19	–	14	.576
Georgia Tech	8	–	10	.444	21	–	16	.568
Clemson	6	–	12	.333	17	–	16	.515
NC State	0	–	14	.000	0	–	17	.000[3]
Pittsburgh	4	–	14	.222	16	–	17	.485
Boston College	2	–	16	.111	9	–	23	.281
† 2017 ACC tournament winner Rankings from AP poll

The 2016–17 Pittsburgh Panthers men's basketball team represented the University of Pittsburgh during the 2016–17 NCAA Division I men's basketball season. The team played its home games at the Petersen Events Center in Pittsburgh, Pennsylvania. The Panthers were led by first-year head coach Kevin Stallings as members of the Atlantic Coast Conference. They finished the season 16–17, 4–14 in ACC play to finish in a tie for 13th place. Pitt had their first losing season in 17 years. They defeated Georgia Tech in the first round of the ACC tournament to advance to the second round where they lost to Virginia.

On January 24, 2017, Pitt lost by 55 points to Louisville, the team's worst loss since 1906.

== Previous season ==
The Panthers finished the 2015–16 season 21–12, 9–9 in ACC play to finish in a tie for ninth place. They defeated Syracuse in the second round of the ACC tournament before losing to North Carolina in the quarterfinals. They received an at-large bid to the NCAA tournament where, as a No. 10 seed, they lost in the First Round to Wisconsin.

Following the season, head coach Jamie Dixon left the school to take the head coaching position at his alma mater, TCU. On March 27, 2016, the school hired Kevin Stallings as head coach.

== Offseason ==
=== Departures ===
Name	Number	Pos.	Height	Weight	Year	Hometown	Notes
James Robinson	0	G	6'3"	198	Senior	Mitchellville, MD	Graduated
Rafael Maia	5	F	6'9"	245	(redshirt) Senior	São Paulo, Brazil	Graduated
Sterling Smith	15	G	6'4"	185	(redshirt) Senior	Chico, CA	Graduated
Mike Lecak	24	G	6'2"	175	(redshirt) Senior	Pittsburgh, PA	Graduated
Alonzo Nelson-Ododa	33	F	6'9"	235	(redshirt) Senior	Atlanta, GA	Graduated

=== Incoming transfers ===
Name	Number	Pos.	Height	Weight	Year	Hometown	Previous School
Crisshawn Clark	0	G	6'4"	180	Sophomore	Huber Heights, OH	Junior college transferred from Canada College.

=== 2016 recruiting class ===
College recruiting information
Name	Hometown	School	Height	Weight	Commit date
Justice Kithcart #26 PG	Durham, NC	Virginia Episcopal School	6 ft 1 in (1.85 m)	170 lb (77 kg)	Sep 20, 2015
Justice Kithcart #26 PG	Recruit ratings: Scout: Rivals: 247Sports: ESPN:				
Corey Manigault; C	Suitland, MD	Paul VI High School	6 ft 8 in (2.03 m)	225 lb (102 kg)	Mar 16, 2015
Corey Manigault; C	Recruit ratings: Scout: Rivals: 247Sports: ESPN:				
Overall recruit ranking:
Note: In many cases, Scout, Rivals, 247Sports, On3, and ESPN may conflict in their listings of height and weight.; In these cases, the average was taken. ESPN grades are on a 100-point scale.; Sources: "2016 Team Ranking". Rivals.

=== 2017 recruiting class ===
College recruiting information (2017)
Name	Hometown	School	Height	Weight	Commit date
Aaron Thompson; PG	Glendale, MD	Paul VI High School	6 ft 2 in (1.88 m)	175 lb (79 kg)	May 8, 2016
Aaron Thompson; PG	Recruit ratings: Scout: Rivals: 247Sports: ESPN:				
Terrell Brown; PF	Barrington, RI	Tilton School	6 ft 10 in (2.08 m)	225 lb (102 kg)	Sep 4, 2016
Terrell Brown; PF	Recruit ratings: Scout: Rivals: 247Sports: ESPN:				
Marcus Carr #PG	Montverde, FL	Montverde Academy	6 ft 2 in (1.88 m)	170 lb (77 kg)	Oct 26, 2016
Marcus Carr #PG	Recruit ratings: Scout: Rivals: 247Sports: ESPN:				
Jared Wilson-Frame; SF	Niceville, Florida	Northwest Florida State College	6 ft 5 in (1.96 m)	220 lb (100 kg)	Oct 28, 2016
Jared Wilson-Frame; SF	Recruit ratings: Scout: Rivals: 247Sports: ESPN:				
Overall recruit ranking:
Note: In many cases, Scout, Rivals, 247Sports, On3, and ESPN may conflict in their listings of height and weight.; In these cases, the average was taken. ESPN grades are on a 100-point scale.; Sources: "2017 Team Ranking". Rivals.

== Roster ==
2016–17 Pittsburgh Panthers men's basketball team
Players
Coaches

Pos.	#	Name	Height	Weight	Year	Previous school	Hometown
G	0	Crisshawn Clark	6 ft 4 in (1.93 m)	210 lb (95 kg)	So	Wayne; Cañada College	Huber Heights, OH
F	1	Jamel Artis	6 ft 7 in (2.01 m)	215 lb (98 kg)	Sr	Notre Dame Prep (Fitchburg, MA)	Baltimore, MD
F	2	Michael Young	6 ft 8 in (2.03 m)	235 lb (107 kg)	Sr	St. Benedict's (Newark, NJ)	Duquesne, PA
G	3	Damon Wilson	6 ft 5 in (1.96 m)	195 lb (88 kg)	So	Our Savior New American	Powder Springs, GA
F	4	Ryan Luther	6 ft 9 in (2.06 m)	225 lb (102 kg)	Jr	Hampton	Gibsonia, PA
G	5	Justice Kithcart	6 ft 1 in (1.85 m)	185 lb (84 kg)	Fr	Virginia Episcopal School	Durham, NC
F	11	Corey Manigault	6 ft 8 in (2.03 m)	230 lb (104 kg)	Fr	Paul VI (VA)	Suitland, MD
G/F	12	Chris Jones (redshirt)	6 ft 6 in (1.98 m)	215 lb (98 kg)	Sr	Teaneck	Teaneck, NJ
F	21	Sheldon Jeter	6 ft 8 in (2.03 m)	230 lb (104 kg)	Sr	Beaver Falls; Polk State College	Beaver Falls, PA
G	23	Cameron Johnson (redshirt)	6 ft 7 in (2.01 m)	210 lb (95 kg)	So	Our Lady of the Sacred Heart	Moon Township, PA
C	25	Rozelle Nix (redshirt)	6 ft 11 in (2.11 m)	300 lb (136 kg)	Jr	Withrow; Pensacola State College	Cincinnati, OH
G	35	Zach Smith	6 ft 3 in (1.91 m)	200 lb (91 kg)	RS Jr	Smethport; Pitt-Bradford	Smethport, PA
F	50	Ryan Seelye (W)	6 ft 6 in (1.98 m)	225 lb (102 kg)	So	Elk County Catholic	St. Marys, PA
G	55	Jonathan Milligan (redshirt)	6 ft 2 in (1.88 m)	170 lb (77 kg)	Jr	Mount Zion Christian (Durham, NC); Kilgore	Orlando, FL

Head coach

- Kevin Stallings (Purdue)

Assistant coach(es)

- Tom Richardson (St. Xavier (IL))
- Kevin Sutton (James Madison)
- Jeremy Ballard (Colgate)

Legend

- (C) Team captain
- (S) Suspended
- (I) Ineligible
- (W) Walk-on
- Injured
- Current redshirt

Roster

== Schedule and results ==
Date time, TV	Rank^{#}	Opponent^{#}	Result	Record	Site (attendance) city, state
Exhibition
Sat. Nov. 5*; 4:00 p.m., ACCN Extra		Pitt-Johnstown	W 95–65	—	Petersen Events Center (2,472); Pittsburgh, PA
Non-conference regular season
Fri. Nov. 11*; 7:00 p.m., ACCN Extra		Eastern Michigan; 2K Sports Classic	W 93–90 ^{2OT}	1–0	Petersen Events Center (6,411); Pittsburgh, PA
Mon. Nov. 14*; 7:00 p.m., ACCN Extra		Gardner–Webb; 2K Sports Classic	W 99–80	2–0	Petersen Events Center (4,614); Pittsburgh, PA
Thu. Nov. 17*; 7:00 p.m., ESPN2		vs. SMU; 2K Sports Classic semifinals	L 67–76	2–1	Madison Square Garden (8,126); New York City, NY
Fri. Nov. 18*; 4:30 p.m., ESPN2		vs. Marquette; 2K Sports Classic 3rd place game	W 78–75	3–1	Madison Square Garden (8,088); New York City, NY
Tue. Nov. 22*; 7:00 p.m., ACCN Extra		Yale	W 75–70	4–1	Petersen Events Center (6,719); Pittsburgh, PA
Fri. Nov. 25*; 7:00 p.m., ACCN Extra		Morehead State	W 76–63	5–1	Petersen Events Center (7,025); Pittsburgh, PA
Tue. Nov. 29*; 7:00 p.m., ESPN2		at Maryland; ACC–Big Ten Challenge	W 73–59	6–1	Xfinity Center (17,144); College Park, MD
Fri. Dec. 2*; 7:00 p.m., ACCN Extra		vs. Duquesne; The City Game	L 55–64	6–2	PPG Paints Arena (10,997); Pittsburgh, PA
Wed. Dec. 7*; 7:00 p.m., ACCN Extra		Buffalo	W 84–79	7–2	Petersen Events Center (7,007); Pittsburgh, PA
Sat. Dec. 10*; 2:30 p.m., CBSSN		vs. Penn State; Never Forget Tribute Classic	W 81–73	8–2	Prudential Center (16,165); Newark, NJ
Sat. Dec. 17*; 7:00 p.m., ACCN Extra		Rice	W 83–73	9–2	Petersen Events Center (7,017); Pittsburgh, PA
Wed. Dec. 21*; 7:00 p.m., ACCN Extra		Omaha	W 94–75	10–2	Petersen Events Center (7,009); Pittsburgh, PA
Wed. Dec. 28*; 7:00 p.m., ACCN Extra		Marshall	W 112–106	11–2	Petersen Events Center (8,028); Pittsburgh, PA
ACC regular season
Sat. Dec. 31; 2:00 p.m., ACCN		No. 24 Notre Dame	L 77–78 ^{OT}	11–3 (0–1)	Petersen Events Center (10,131); Pittsburgh, PA
Wed. Jan. 4; 9:00 p.m., ACCRSN		No. 11 Virginia	W 88–76 ^{OT}	12–3 (1–1)	Petersen Events Center (9,814); Pittsburgh, PA
Sat. Jan. 7; 12:00 p.m., ACCN		at Syracuse	L 66–77	12–4 (1–2)	Carrier Dome (20,034); Syracuse, NY
Wed. Jan. 11; 7:00 p.m., ACCRSN		at No. 14 Louisville	L 80–85	12–5 (1–3)	KFC Yum! Center (21,558); Louisville, KY
Sat. Jan. 14; 12:00 p.m., ACCRSN		Miami (FL)	L 46–72	12–6 (1–4)	Petersen Events Center (9,714); Pittsburgh, PA
Tue. Jan. 17; 7:00 p.m., ESPNU		at NC State	L 74–79	12–7 (1–5)	PNC Arena (15,877); Raleigh, NC
Tue. Jan. 24; 7:00 p.m., ESPNU		No. 13 Louisville	L 51–106	12–8 (1–6)	Petersen Events Center (8,971); Pittsburgh, PA
Sat. Jan. 28; 12:00 p.m., ACCRSN		Clemson	L 60–67	12–9 (1–7)	Petersen Events Center (9,828); Pittsburgh, PA
Tue. Jan. 31; 7:00 p.m., ESPN2		at No. 12 North Carolina	L 78–80	12–10 (1–8)	Dean E. Smith Center (18,438); Chapel Hill, NC
Sat. Feb. 4; 1:00 p.m., CBS		at No. 21 Duke	L 64–72	12–11 (1–9)	Cameron Indoor Stadium (9,314); Durham, NC
Wed. Feb. 8; 7:00 p.m., ACCRSN		at Boston College	W 83–72	13–11 (2–9)	Conte Forum (3,843); Chestnut Hill, MA
Sat. Feb. 11; 1:00 p.m., ACCN		Syracuse	W 80–75	14–11 (3–9)	Petersen Events Center (10,216); Pittsburgh, PA
Tue. Feb. 14; 7:00 p.m., ESPN2		Virginia Tech	L 63–66	14–12 (3–10)	Petersen Events Center (7,835); Pittsburgh, PA
Sat. Feb. 18; 4:00 p.m., ESPN2		No. 17 Florida State	W 80–66	15–12 (4–10)	Petersen Events Center (10,525); Pittsburgh, PA
Wed. Feb. 22; 7:00 p.m., ACCRSN		at Wake Forest	L 59–63	15–13 (4–11)	Lawrence Joel Veterans Memorial Coliseum (9,827); Winston-Salem, NC
Sat. Feb. 25; 12:00 p.m., ACCN		No. 8 North Carolina	L 67–85	15–14 (4–12)	Petersen Events Center (10,704); Pittsburgh, PA
Tue. Feb. 28; 9:00 p.m., ESPNU		at Georgia Tech	L 52–61	15–15 (4–13)	Hank McCamish Pavilion (7,185); Atlanta, GA
Sat. Mar. 4; 12:00 p.m., ACCN		at No. 23 Virginia	L 42–67	15–16 (4–14)	John Paul Jones Arena (14,228); Charlottesville, VA
ACC Tournament
Tue. Mar. 7; 7:00 p.m., ESPNU/ACCN	(14)	vs. (11) Georgia Tech; First Rround	W 61–59	16–16	Barclays Center (8,656); Brooklyn, NY
Wed. Mar. 8; 9:00 p.m., ESPN2/ACCN	(14)	vs. (6) No. 21 Virginia; Second round	L 63–75	16–17	Barclays Center (17,732); Brooklyn, NY
*Non-conference game. ^{#}Rankings from AP Poll. (#) Tournament seedings in parentheses. All times are in Eastern Time.

== Rankings ==
Ranking movement Legend: ██ Increase in ranking. ██ Decrease in ranking. ██ Not ranked the previous week.
Poll	Pre	Wk 1	Wk 2	Wk 3	Wk 4	Wk 5	Wk 6	Wk 7	Wk 8	Wk 9	Wk 10	Wk 11	Wk 12	Wk 13	Wk 14	Wk 15	Wk 16	Wk 17	Wk 18	Wk 19	Wk 20	Final
AP	NR	NR	NR	NR	NR	NR	RV	NR	NR	NR	NR	NR	NR	NR	NR	NR	NR	NR	NR	NR	NR	*N/A
Coaches	RV	RV	NR	NR	NR	NR	NR	NR	NR	NR	NR	NR	NR	NR	NR	NR	NR	NR	NR	NR	NR	NR

*AP does not release post-NCAA tournament rankings
