= 2016–17 Louisville Cardinals men's basketball team =

American college basketball season

2016–17 Louisville Cardinals men's basketball

NCAA tournament, Second Round
- Conference: Atlantic Coast Conference

Ranking
- Coaches: No. 14
- AP: No. 10
- Record: 25–9 (12–6 ACC)
- Head coach: Rick Pitino (16th season)
- Assistant coaches: Kenny Johnson; Mike Balado; David Padgett
- Home arena: KFC Yum! Center

2016–17 ACC men's basketball standings
	Conf.				Overall
Team	W		L	PCT	W		L	PCT
No. 5 North Carolina	14	–	4	.778	33	–	7	.825
No. 16 Florida State	12	–	6	.667	26	–	9	.743
No. 14 Notre Dame	12	–	6	.667	26	–	10	.722
No. 10 Louisville	12	–	6	.667	25	–	9	.735
No. 7 Duke †	11	–	7	.611	28	–	9	.757
No. 24 Virginia	11	–	7	.611	23	–	11	.676
Virginia Tech	10	–	8	.556	22	–	11	.667
Miami (FL)	10	–	8	.556	21	–	12	.636
Syracuse	10	–	8	.556	19	–	15	.559
Wake Forest	9	–	9	.500	19	–	14	.576
Georgia Tech	8	–	10	.444	21	–	16	.568
Clemson	6	–	12	.333	17	–	16	.515
NC State	0	–	14	.000	0	–	17	.000[3]
Pittsburgh	4	–	14	.222	16	–	17	.485
Boston College	2	–	16	.111	9	–	23	.281
† 2017 ACC tournament winner Rankings from AP poll

The 2016–17 Louisville Cardinals men's basketball team represented the University of Louisville during the 2016–17 NCAA Division I men's basketball season. The Cardinals competed in the Atlantic Coast Conference and were coached by Rick Pitino, in his 16th and final season at Louisville. The team played its home games on Denny Crum Court at the KFC Yum! Center in downtown Louisville. They finished the season 25–9, 12–6 in ACC play to finish in a three-way tie for second place. They lost to Duke in the quarterfinals of the ACC tournament. They received an at-large bid to the NCAA tournament where they defeated Jacksonville State in the first round to advance to the second round where they lost to Michigan.

== Previous season ==
The Cardinals finished the 2015–16 season with a record of 23–8, 12–6 in ACC play to finish in fourth place.

The University of Louisville self-imposed a postseason ban for the 2015–16 season amid an ongoing NCAA investigation over an escort sex scandal involving recruits between 2010 and 2014. None of the players on this team were involved in the allegations. The ban included both the ACC tournament and the NCAA tournament.

== Departures ==
Name	Number	Pos.	Height	Weight	Year	Hometown	Notes
Damion Lee	0	G	6'6"	210	RS Senior	Baltimore, MD	Graduated
Trey Lewis	3	G	6'2"	185	RS Senior	Garfield Heights, OH	Graduated
Dillon Avare	4	G	6'0"	155	RS Sophomore	Lexington, KY	Walk-on; transferred to Eastern Kentucky
Chinanu Onuaku	32	F/C	6'10"	245	Sophomore	Lanham, MD	Declared for 2016 NBA draft

=== Incoming transfers ===
Name	Number	Pos.	Height	Weight	Year	Hometown	Previous School
Tony Hicks	1	G	6'1"	180	Graduate Student	South Holland, IL	Transferred from Pennsylvania. As a graduate transfer, Hicks will be eligible to play right away.
Dwayne Sutton	24	F	6'5"	200	Sophomore	Louisville, KY	Transferred from UNC Asheville. Under NCAA transfer rules, Sutton will have to sit out for the 2016–17 season. Will have three years of remaining eligibility. Will join the team as a preferred walk-on.

== Class of 2016 signees ==
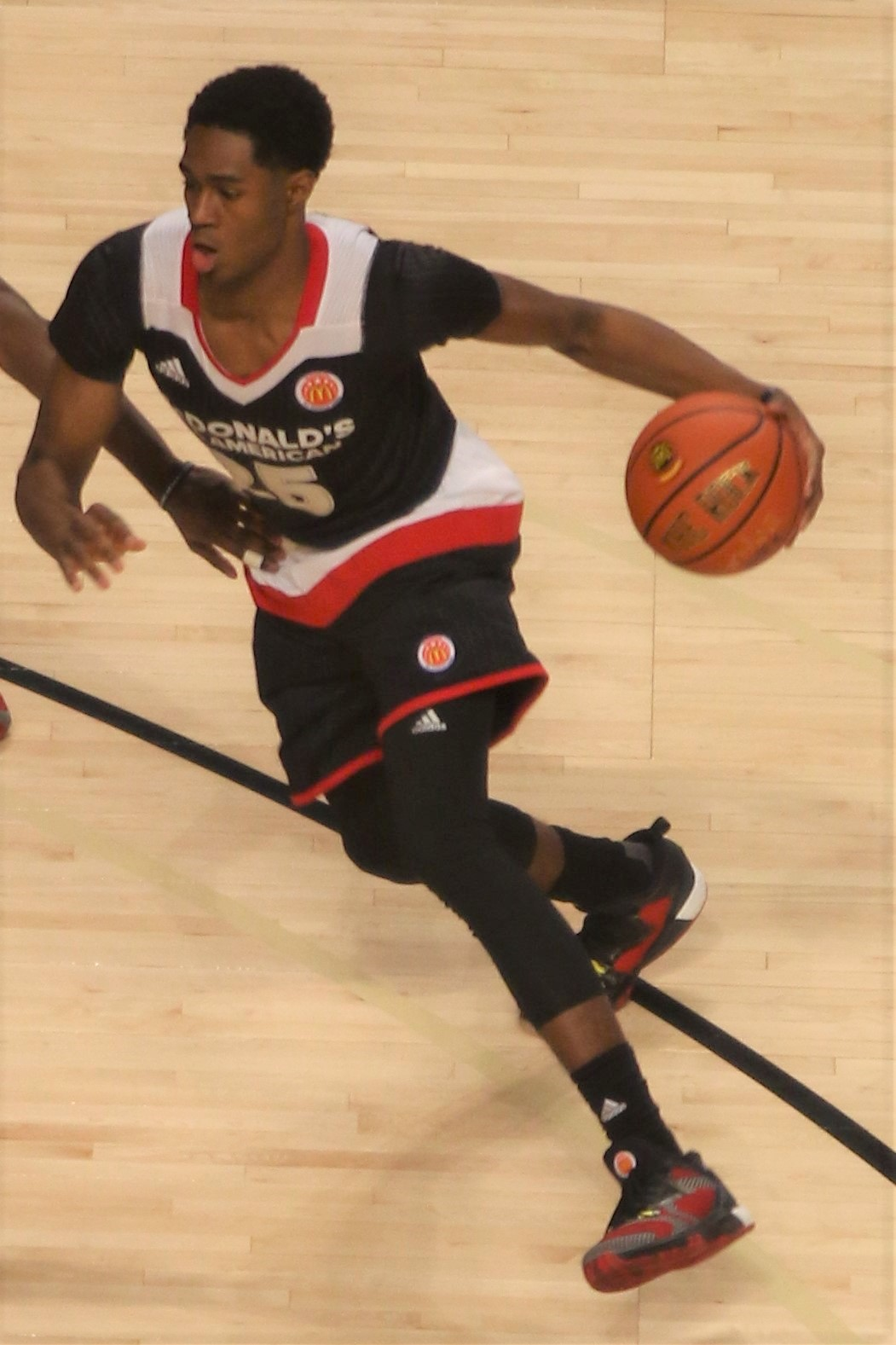
V. J. King at the 2016 McDonald's All-American Game

College recruiting information
Name	Hometown	School	Height	Weight	Commit date
V. J. King; SF	Cleveland, OH	Paul VI Catholic High School	6 ft 7 in (2.01 m)	179 lb (81 kg)	Jun 12, 2015
V. J. King; SF	Recruit ratings: Scout: Rivals: 247Sports: ESPN:				
Overall recruit ranking: Scout: 8 Rivals: 7 ESPN: 8
Note: In many cases, Scout, Rivals, 247Sports, On3, and ESPN may conflict in their listings of height and weight.; In these cases, the average was taken. ESPN grades are on a 100-point scale.; Sources: "Louisville Basketball Commitment List". Rivals.; "2016 Louisville Basketball Commitment List". Scout.; "ESPN". ESPN.; "Scout.com Team Recruiting Rankings". Scout.; "2016 Team Ranking". Rivals.

== Class of 2017 recruits ==
College recruiting information
Name	Hometown	School	Height	Weight	Commit date
Brian Bowen; SF	Saginaw, MI	La Lumiere School	6 ft 7 in (2.01 m)	215 lb (98 kg)	Jun 3, 2017
Brian Bowen; SF	Recruit ratings: Scout: Rivals: 247Sports: ESPN:				
Malik Williams; C	Fort Wayne, IN	Snider High School	7 ft 0 in (2.13 m)	200 lb (91 kg)	Aug 4, 2016
Malik Williams; C	Recruit ratings: Scout: Rivals: 247Sports: ESPN:				
Darius Perry; PG	Marietta, GA	Wheeler High School	6 ft 2 in (1.88 m)	170 lb (77 kg)	Aug 16, 2016
Darius Perry; PG	Recruit ratings: Scout: Rivals: 247Sports: ESPN:				
Jordan Nwora; SF	Saxtons River, VT	Vermont Academy	6 ft 8 in (2.03 m)	220 lb (100 kg)	Oct 19, 2016
Jordan Nwora; SF	Recruit ratings: Scout: Rivals: 247Sports: ESPN:				
Lance Thomas; PF	Norcross, GA	Norcross High School	6 ft 10 in (2.08 m)	210 lb (95 kg)	Oct 30, 2016
Lance Thomas; PF	Recruit ratings: Scout: Rivals: 247Sports: ESPN:				
Overall recruit ranking:
Note: In many cases, Scout, Rivals, 247Sports, On3, and ESPN may conflict in their listings of height and weight.; In these cases, the average was taken. ESPN grades are on a 100-point scale.; Sources: "2017 Louisville Commitments". Rivals.; "Men's Basketball Recruiting". Scout.; "ESPN- Louisville Cardinals Men's Basketball Recruiting". ESPN.; "Scout.com Team Recruiting Rankings". Scout.; "2017 Team Ranking". Rivals.

== Roster ==
2016–17 Louisville Cardinals men's basketball team
Players
Coaches

Pos.	#	Name	Height	Weight	Year	Previous school	Hometown
F	0	V. J. King	6 ft 6 in (1.98 m)	190 lb (86 kg)	Fr	Paul VI	Cleveland, Ohio
G	1	Tony Hicks	6 ft 1 in (1.85 m)	180 lb (82 kg)	GS	St. Rita; Penn	South Holland, Illinois
G	4	Quentin Snider	6 ft 2 in (1.88 m)	175 lb (79 kg)	Jr	Ballard	Louisville, Kentucky
F/C	5	Matz Stockman	7 ft 0 in (2.13 m)	240 lb (109 kg)	Jr	Canarias (BAH)	Oslo, Norway
F	10	Jaylen Johnson	6 ft 9 in (2.06 m)	230 lb (104 kg)	Jr	Ypsilanti	Ypsilanti, Michigan
G	11	Jay Henderson (W)	6 ft 4 in (1.93 m)	180 lb (82 kg)	RS So	Lake Highland Prep	Orlando, Florida
F/C	12	Mangok Mathiang (C)	6 ft 10 in (2.08 m)	230 lb (104 kg)	RS Sr	IMG Academy (FL)	Melbourne, Australia
F	13	Ray Spalding	6 ft 10 in (2.08 m)	215 lb (98 kg)	So	Trinity	Louisville, Kentucky
F	14	Anas Mahmoud	7 ft 0 in (2.13 m)	215 lb (98 kg)	Jr	West Oaks (FL)	Cairo, Egypt
G	15	Tyler Sharpe (W)	6 ft 1 in (1.85 m)	185 lb (84 kg)	Fr	Bullitt East	Louisville, Kentucky
F	22	Deng Adel	6 ft 7 in (2.01 m)	200 lb (91 kg)	So	Victory Rock Prep	Melbourne, Australia
F	23	David Levtich	6 ft 3 in (1.91 m)	180 lb (82 kg)	Sr	North Oldham	Goshen, Kentucky
F	24	Dwayne Sutton (W) (redshirt)	6 ft 5 in (1.96 m)	200 lb (91 kg)	So	duPont Manuel; UNC Asheville	Louisville, Kentucky
G	30	Ryan McMahon	6 ft 0 in (1.83 m)	170 lb (77 kg)	RS Fr	Cardinal Mooney	Sarasota, Florida
G	45	Donovan Mitchell	6 ft 3 in (1.91 m)	200 lb (91 kg)	So	Brewster Academy	Greenwich, Connecticut

Head coach

- Rick Pitino (UMass)

Assistant coach(es)

- Kenny Johnson (Maryland)
- Mike Balado (St. Thomas)
- David Padgett (Louisville)

Legend

- (C) Team captain
- (S) Suspended
- (I) Ineligible
- (W) Walk-on
- Injured
- Current redshirt

Roster

== Schedule and results ==
Date time, TV	Rank^{#}	Opponent^{#}	Result	Record	High points	High rebounds	High assists	Site (attendance) city, state
Exhibition
Nov 3, 2016*; 7:00 pm, ACCN Extra	No. 13	Kentucky Wesleyan	W 109–71		16 – Adel	7 – Adel	5 – Hicks	KFC Yum! Center (15,836); Louisville, KY
Nov 7, 2016*; 7:00 pm, ACCN Extra	No. 13	Bellarmine	W 81–60		13 – Tied	11 – Johnson	4 – Snider	KFC Yum! Center (16,437); Louisville, KY
Regular season
Nov 11, 2016*; 7:00 pm, ACCN Extra	No. 13	Evansville	W 78–47	1–0	19 – Johnson	11 – Johnson	3 – Tied	KFC Yum! Center (21,129); Louisville, KY
Nov 14, 2016*; 7:00 pm, ACCN Extra	No. 12	William & Mary	W 91–58	2–0	17 – King	10 – Mathiang	5 – Adel	KFC Yum! Center (19,314); Louisville, KY
Nov 17, 2016*; 7:00 pm, ACCN Extra	No. 12	Long Beach State; Battle 4 Atlantis opening round	W 88–56	3–0	14 – Johnson	11 – Johnson	5 – Snider	KFC Yum! Center (14,337); Louisville, KY
Nov 23, 2016*; 9:30 pm, AXS TV	No. 10	vs. Old Dominion; Battle 4 Atlantis quarterfinals	W 68–62 ^{OT}	4–0	18 – Snider	12 – Johnson	4 – Snider	Imperial Arena (1,601); Nassau, Bahamas
Nov 24, 2016*; 2:30 pm, ESPN	No. 10	vs. Wichita State; Battle 4 Atlantis semifinals	W 62–52	5–0	14 – Tied	9 – Spalding	5 – Mitchell	Imperial Arena (1,604); Nassau, Bahamas
Nov 25, 2016*; 3:30 pm, ESPN	No. 10	vs. No. 20 Baylor; Battle 4 Atlantis championship	L 63–66	5–1	17 – Mitchell	8 – Mitchell	4 – Mitchell	Imperial Arena (1,655); Nassau, Bahamas
Nov 30, 2016*; 7:00 pm, ESPN	No. 14	No. 15 Purdue; ACC–Big Ten Challenge	W 71–64	6–1	11 – Tied	9 – Spalding	2 – Tied (3)	KFC Yum! Center (21,841); Louisville, KY
Dec 3, 2016*; 9:00 pm, ESPN3/WAVE	No. 14	at Grand Canyon	W 79–70	7–1	15 – Adel	8 – Mathiang	4 – Snider	GCU Arena (7,493); Phoenix, AZ
Dec 7, 2016*; 7:00 pm, ACCN Extra	No. 11	Southern Illinois	W 74–51	8–1	15 – Mathiang	12 – Adel	4 – Snider	KFC Yum! Center (18,894); Louisville, KY
Dec 10, 2016*; 7:00 pm, ACCN Extra	No. 11	Texas Southern	W 102–71	9–1	15 – Snider	8 – Tied	4 – Snider	KFC Yum! Center (18,152); Louisville, KY
Dec 17, 2016*; 12:00 pm, ACCN Extra	No. 11	Eastern Kentucky; Billy Minardi Classic	W 87–56	10–1	15 – Mitchell	13 – Mathiang	6 – Snider	KFC Yum! Center (22,090); Louisville, KY
Dec 21, 2016*; 7:00 pm, ESPN	No. 10	No. 6 Kentucky; The Battle for the Bluegrass	W 73–70	11–1	22 – Snider	7 – Spalding	5 – Snider	KFC Yum! Center (22,783); Louisville, KY
Dec 28, 2016; 7:00 pm, ESPN2	No. 6	No. 12 Virginia	L 53–61	11–2 (0–1)	8 – Tied (3)	6 – Spalding	2 – Mahmoud	KFC Yum! Center (21,676); Louisville, KY
Dec 31, 2016*; 12:30 pm, CBS	No. 6	vs. No. 16 Indiana; Countdown Classic	W 77–62	12–2	25 – Mitchell	7 – Johnson	4 – Adel	Bankers Life Fieldhouse (18,824); Indianapolis, IN
Jan 4, 2017; 9:00 pm, ACCN/WAVE	No. 9	at No. 23 Notre Dame	L 70–77	12–3 (0–2)	20 – Mitchell	10 – Spalding	5 – Mitchell	Edmund P. Joyce Center (8,420); South Bend, IN
Jan 7, 2017; 2:00 pm, ACCN/WHAS	No. 9	at Georgia Tech	W 65–50	13–3 (1–2)	20 – Mitchell	12 – Spalding	7 – Snider	McCamish Pavilion (6,160); Atlanta, GA
Jan 11, 2017; 7:00 pm, RSN	No. 14	Pittsburgh	W 85–80	14–3 (2–2)	22 – Snider	8 – Tied	5 – Snider	KFC Yum! Center (21,558); Louisville, KY
Jan 14, 2017; 12:00 pm, ESPN	No. 14	No. 7 Duke	W 78–69	15–3 (3–2)	17 – Mahmoud	11 – Mahmoud	6 – Snider	KFC Yum! Center (22,686); Louisville, KY
Jan 19, 2017; 9:00 pm, ESPN	No. 12	Clemson	W 92–60	16–3 (4–2)	18 – Tied	10 – Johnson	4 – Mitchell	KFC Yum! Center (21,436); Louisville, KY
Jan 21, 2017; 2:00 pm, ESPN	No. 12	at No. 10 Florida State	L 68–73	16–4 (4–3)	16 – Hicks	13 – Mathiang	3 – Levitch	Donald L. Tucker Center (11,675); Tallahassee, FL
Jan 24, 2017; 7:00 pm, ESPNU	No. 13	at Pittsburgh	W 106–51	17–4 (5–3)	29 – Mitchell	11 – Johnson	5 – McMahon	Petersen Events Center (8,971); Pittsburgh, PA
Jan 29, 2017; 1:00 pm, ACCN/WAVE	No. 13	NC State	W 85–60	18–4 (6–3)	28 – Mitchell	8 – Mitchell	5 – Mitchell	KFC Yum! Center (21,650); Louisville, KY
Feb 4, 2017; 3:00 pm, ACCN/WHAS	No. 6	at Boston College	W 90–67	19–4 (7–3)	19 – Tied	7 – Tied	3 – Tied	Conte Forum (7,047); Chestnut Hill, MA
Feb 6, 2017; 7:00 pm, ESPN	No. 4	at No. 12 Virginia	L 55–71	19–5 (7–4)	24 – King	5 – Spalding	3 – Mitchell	John Paul Jones Arena (14,623); Charlottesville, VA
Feb 11, 2017; 2:00 pm, ESPN2	No. 4	Miami (FL)	W 71–66	20–5 (8–4)	18 – Tied	8 – Tied	4 – Tied	KFC Yum! Center (21,427); Louisville, KY
Feb 13, 2017; 7:00 pm, ESPN	No. 8	at Syracuse	W 76–72 ^{OT}	21–5 (9–4)	16 – Mitchell	8 – Mahmoud	6 – Snider	Carrier Dome (25,303); Syracuse, NY
Feb 18, 2017; 1:00 pm, ACCN/WAVE	No. 8	Virginia Tech	W 94–90	22–5 (10–4)	29 – Mitchell	8 – Johnson	4 – Snider	KFC Yum! Center (21,524); Louisville, KY
Feb 22, 2017; 9:00 pm, ESPN	No. 7	at No. 8 North Carolina	L 63–74	22–6 (10–5)	21 – Mitchell	6 – Adel	3 – Mitchell	Dean E. Smith Center (21,296); Chapel Hill, NC
Feb 26, 2017; 2:00 pm, CBS	No. 7	Syracuse	W 88–68	23–6 (11–5)	25 – Mitchell	11 – Spalding	6 – Snider	KFC Yum! Center (22,482); Louisville, KY
Mar 1, 2017; 9:00 pm, RSN	No. 8	at Wake Forest	L 81–88	23–7 (11–6)	22 – Adel	10 – Mathiang	3 – Adel	LJVM Coliseum (11,488); Winston-Salem, NC
Mar 4, 2017; 2:00 pm, CBS	No. 8	No. 19 Notre Dame	W 71–64	24–7 (12–6)	20 – Mitchell	11 – Mathiang	6 – Snider	KFC Yum! Center (22,612); Louisville, KY
ACC Tournament
March 9, 2017; 2:00 pm, ESPN	(4) No. 10	vs. (5) No. 14 Duke; Quarterfinals	L 77–81	24–8	21 – Adel	7 – Mahmoud	5 – Snider	Barclays Center (17,732); Brooklyn, NY
NCAA tournament
March 17, 2017; 2:45 pm, CBS	(2 MW) No. 10	vs. (15 MW) Jacksonville State; First Round	W 78–63	25–8	18 – Mathiang	10 – Mitchell	5 – Tied	Bankers Life Fieldhouse (18,255); Indianapolis, IN
March 19, 2017; 12:10 pm, CBS	(2 MW) No. 10	vs. (7 MW) No. 23 Michigan; Second Round	L 69–73	25–9	19 – Mitchell	7 – Mitchell	5 – Mitchell	Bankers Life Fieldhouse (18,293); Indianapolis, IN
*Non-conference game. ^{#}Rankings from AP Poll. (#) Tournament seedings in parentheses. MW=Midwest Region. All times are in Eastern Time.

== Rankings ==
Ranking movements Legend: ██ Increase in ranking ██ Decrease in ranking
	Week																			
Poll	Pre	1	2	3	4	5	6	7	8	9	10	11	12	13	14	15	16	17	18	Final
AP	13	12	10	14	11	11	10	6	9	14	12	13	6	4	8	7	8	10	10	Not released
Coaches	14	12	10	14	13	11	11	7	9	15	11	14	7	4	7	6	7	9	10	14

*AP does not release post-NCAA Tournament rankings
