= 2016–17 Virginia Tech Hokies men's basketball team =

American college basketball season

2016–17 Virginia Tech Hokies men's basketball
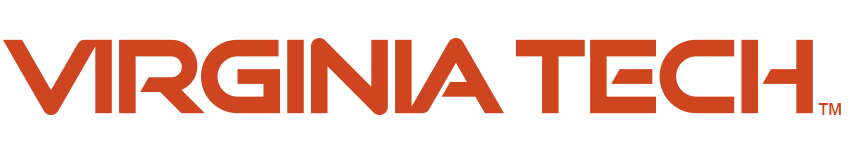

NCAA tournament, First Round
- Conference: Atlantic Coast Conference
- Record: 22–11 (10–8 ACC)
- Head coach: Buzz Williams (3rd season)
- Assistant coaches: Steve Roccaforte; Jamie McNeilly; Christian Webster
- Home arena: Cassell Coliseum

2016–17 ACC men's basketball standings
	Conf.				Overall
Team	W		L	PCT	W		L	PCT
No. 5 North Carolina	14	–	4	.778	33	–	7	.825
No. 16 Florida State	12	–	6	.667	26	–	9	.743
No. 14 Notre Dame	12	–	6	.667	26	–	10	.722
No. 10 Louisville	12	–	6	.667	25	–	9	.735
No. 7 Duke †	11	–	7	.611	28	–	9	.757
No. 24 Virginia	11	–	7	.611	23	–	11	.676
Virginia Tech	10	–	8	.556	22	–	11	.667
Miami (FL)	10	–	8	.556	21	–	12	.636
Syracuse	10	–	8	.556	19	–	15	.559
Wake Forest	9	–	9	.500	19	–	14	.576
Georgia Tech	8	–	10	.444	21	–	16	.568
Clemson	6	–	12	.333	17	–	16	.515
NC State	0	–	14	.000	0	–	17	.000[3]
Pittsburgh	4	–	14	.222	16	–	17	.485
Boston College	2	–	16	.111	9	–	23	.281
† 2017 ACC tournament winner Rankings from AP poll

The 2016–17 Virginia Tech Hokies men's basketball team represented Virginia Polytechnic Institute and State University during the 2016–17 NCAA Division I men's basketball season. The Hokies were led by third-year head coach Buzz Williams and played their home games at Cassell Coliseum in Blacksburg, Virginia as a member of the Atlantic Coast Conference. They finished the season 22–11, 10–8 in ACC play to finish a three-way tie for seventh place. As the No. 7 seed in the ACC tournament, they beat Wake Forest before losing to Florida State in the quarterfinals. They received an at-large bid to the NCAA tournament. As a No. 9 seed in the East region, they lost in the first round to Wisconsin.

== Previous season ==
The Hokies finished the 2015–16 season 20–15, 10–8 in ACC play to finish in a tie for seventh place. They defeated Florida State in the second round of the ACC tournament to advance to the quarterfinals, where they lost to Miami (FL). They were invited to the National Invitation Tournament, where they defeated Princeton in the first round to advance to the second round, where they lost to BYU.

== Departures ==
Name	Number	Pos.	Height	Weight	Year	Hometown	Reason for departure
Shane Henry	0	F	6'8"	190	Senior	Newton, GA	Graduated
Satchel Pierce	21	F	7'0"	255	Sophomore	Barberton, OH	Transferred to Penn State
Jalen Hudson	23	G	6'5"	195	Sophomore	Akron, OH	Transferred to Florida

=== Incoming transfers ===
Name	Number	Pos.	Height	Weight	Year	Hometown	Previous school
Seth LeDay	3	F	6'7"	200	Junior	Houston, TX	Junior college transferred from Northwest Mississippi Community College

== Recruiting class ==
College recruiting
Name	Hometown	School	Height	Weight	Commit date
Khadim Sy #26 C	Mouth of Wilson, VA	Oak Hill Academy	6 ft 9 in (2.06 m)	245 lb (111 kg)	Oct 26, 2015
Khadim Sy #26 C	Recruit ratings: Scout: Rivals: 247Sports: ESPN:				
Tyrie Jackson; PG	Tifton, GA	Tift County High School	6 ft 1 in (1.85 m)	180 lb (82 kg)	May 29, 2016
Tyrie Jackson; PG	Recruit ratings: Scout: Rivals: 247Sports: ESPN:				
Overall recruit ranking: Scout: NA Rivals: NA 247Sports: 23 ESPN: 19
Note: In many cases, Scout, Rivals, 247Sports, On3, and ESPN may conflict in their listings of height and weight.; In these cases, the average was taken. ESPN grades are on a 100-point scale.; Sources: "Virginia Tech Commit List for 2016". Rivals.; "ESPN". ESPN.; "2016 Team Ranking". Rivals.

=== 2017 recruiting class ===
College recruiting (2017)
Name	Hometown	School	Height	Weight	Commit date
Nickeil Alexander-Walker; SG	Toronto, ON	Hamilton Heights Christian Academy	6 ft 5 in (1.96 m)	195 lb (88 kg)	May 5, 2016
Nickeil Alexander-Walker; SG	Recruit ratings: Scout: Rivals: 247Sports: ESPN:				
Wabissa Bede; PG	Ashburnham, MA	Cushing Academy	6 ft 1 in (1.85 m)	180 lb (82 kg)	Sep 28, 2016
Wabissa Bede; PG	Recruit ratings: Scout: Rivals: 247Sports: ESPN:				
Overall recruit ranking: Scout: NA Rivals: NA 247Sports: 23 ESPN: 19
Note: In many cases, Scout, Rivals, 247Sports, On3, and ESPN may conflict in their listings of height and weight.; In these cases, the average was taken. ESPN grades are on a 100-point scale.; Sources: "Virginia Tech Commit List for 2017". Rivals.; "ESPN". ESPN.; "2017 Team Ranking". Rivals.

== Roster ==
2016–17 Virginia Tech Hokies men's basketball team
Players
Coaches

Pos.	#	Name	Height	Weight	Year	Previous school	Hometown
G	1	Tyrie Jackson	6 ft 1 in (1.85 m)	205 lb (93 kg)	Fr	Tift County	Tifton, Georgia
F/C	2	Khadim Sy	6 ft 10 in (2.08 m)	240 lb (109 kg)	Fr	Oak Hill Academy	Dakar, Senegal
F	3	Seth LeDay	6 ft 7 in (2.01 m)	200 lb (91 kg)	Jr	The Colony/NW Mississippi CC	The Colony, Texas
G	4	Seth Allen	6 ft 1 in (1.85 m)	190 lb (86 kg)	RS Sr	Fredericksburg Christian/Maryland	Woodbridge, Virginia
G	5	Justin Robinson	6 ft 1 in (1.85 m)	185 lb (84 kg)	So	St. James School (MD)	Manassas, Virginia
G	10	Justin Bibbs	6 ft 5 in (1.96 m)	220 lb (100 kg)	Jr	Montverde Academy	Dayton, Ohio
G	11	Devin Wilson	6 ft 4 in (1.93 m)	195 lb (88 kg)	RS Sr	Montour	McKees Rocks, Pennsylvania
G	13	Ahmed Hill	6 ft 5 in (1.96 m)	205 lb (93 kg)	RS So	Aquinas	Augusta, Georgia
F	14	Greg Donlon (W)	6 ft 8 in (2.03 m)	230 lb (104 kg)	RS Sr	Cosby	Midlothian, Virginia
G/F	15	Chris Clarke	6 ft 6 in (1.98 m)	210 lb (95 kg)	So	Cape Henry	Virginia Beach, Virginia
F	21	Nick Fullard (W, I) (redshirt)	6 ft 10 in (2.08 m)	235 lb (107 kg)	Jr	St. Mary's Ryken; Belmont Abbey	La Plata, Maryland
C	22	Johnny Hamilton	7 ft 0 in (2.13 m)	230 lb (104 kg)	Sr	St. Augustine/Jacksonville College	Rio Claro, Trinidad and Tobago
F	24	Kerry Blackshear Jr.	6 ft 10 in (2.08 m)	260 lb (118 kg)	So	Maynard Evans	Orlando, Florida
F	32	Zach LeDay	6 ft 7 in (2.01 m)	235 lb (107 kg)	RS Sr	The Colony/South Florida	Dallas, Texas
G	33	Matt Galloway (W)	6 ft 3 in (1.91 m)	205 lb (93 kg)	RS Sr	Potomac Falls/Hood College	Sterling, Virginia
G/F	42	Ty Outlaw	6 ft 6 in (1.98 m)	220 lb (100 kg)	RS Jr	Person/Lee College	Roxboro, North Carolina

Head coach

- Buzz Williams (Oklahoma City)

Assistant coach(es)

- Steve Roccaforte (Lamar)
- Jamie McNeilly (LSU New Orleans)
- Christian Webster (Harvard)

Legend

- (C) Team captain
- (S) Suspended
- (I) Ineligible
- (W) Walk-on
- Injured
- Current redshirt

Roster

== Schedule and results ==
Date time, TV	Rank^{#}	Opponent^{#}	Result	Record	Site (attendance) city, state
Non-conference regular season
11/11/2016*; 9:00 pm, ACCN Extra		Maine	W 80–67	1–0	Cassell Coliseum (9,567); Blacksburg, VA
11/15/2016*; 7:00 pm, ACCN Extra		High Point	W 99–73	2–0	Cassell Coliseum (6,428); Blacksburg, VA
11/19/2016*; 7:00 pm, ACCN Extra		VMI	W 88–72	3–0	Cassell Coliseum (7,714); Blacksburg, VA
11/24/2016*; 4:30 pm, ESPN		vs. New Mexico; Wooden Legacy quarterfinals	W 92–72	4–0	Titan Gym; Fullerton, CA
11/25/2016*; 5:30 pm, ESPNU		vs. Texas A&M; Wooden Legacy semifinals	L 65–68	4–1	Titan Gym; Fullerton, CA
11/27/2016*; 4:00 pm, ESPNU		vs. Nebraska; Wooden Legacy third place game	W 66–53	5–1	Honda Center; Anaheim, CA
11/30/2016*; 7:00 pm, ESPN2		at Michigan; ACC–Big Ten Challenge	W 73–70	6–1	Crisler Arena (9,981); Ann Arbor, MI
12/07/2016*; 8:30 pm, ACCN Extra		Maryland Eastern Shore	W 75–59	7–1	Cassell Coliseum (7,068); Blacksburg, VA
12/11/2016*; 12:00 pm, ESPNU		Ole Miss	W 80–75	8–1	Cassell Coliseum (7,522); Blacksburg, VA
12/17/2016*; 1:00 pm, ACCN Extra		The Citadel	W 113–71	9–1	Cassell Coliseum (5,664); Blacksburg, VA
12/20/2016*; 9:00 pm, ESPNU		Charleston Southern	W 87–59	10–1	Cassell Coliseum (5,249); Blacksburg, VA
12/28/2016*; 7:00 pm, ACCN Extra		UMBC	W 87–70	11–1	Cassell Coliseum (5,458); Blacksburg, VA
ACC regular season
12/31/2016; 12:00 pm, ESPN2		No. 5 Duke	W 89–75	12–1 (1–0)	Cassell Coliseum (9,567); Blacksburg, VA
01/04/2017; 9:00 pm, ACCN	No. 21	at NC State	L 78–104	12–2 (1–1)	PNC Arena (16,185); Raleigh, NC
01/07/2017; 2:00 pm, ACCN	No. 21	at No. 12 Florida State	L 78–93	12–3 (1–2)	Donald L. Tucker Civic Center (7,041); Tallahassee, FL
01/10/2017; 7:00 pm, ESPNU		Syracuse	W 83–73	13–3 (2–2)	Cassell Coliseum (6,047); Blacksburg, VA
01/14/2017; 2:00 pm, ACCN		No. 20 Notre Dame	L 71–76	13–4 (2–3)	Cassell Coliseum (9,567); Blacksburg, VA
01/18/2017; 7:00 pm, RSN		Georgia Tech	W 62–61	14–4 (3–3)	Cassell Coliseum (6,598); Blacksburg, VA
01/22/2017; 6:30 pm, ESPNU		at Clemson	W 82–81	15–4 (4–3)	Littlejohn Coliseum (7,120); Clemson, SC
01/26/2017; 8:00 pm, ESPN		at No. 9 North Carolina	L 72–91	15–5 (4–4)	Dean Smith Center (20,113); Chapel Hill, NC
01/29/2017; 6:30 pm, ESPNU		Boston College	W 85–79	16–5 (5–4)	Cassell Coliseum (7,372); Blacksburg, VA
02/01/2017; 8:00 pm, ACCN		at No. 9 Virginia; Commonwealth Clash	L 48–71	16–6 (5–5)	John Paul Jones Arena (14,623); Charlottesville, VA
02/08/2017; 9:00 pm, RSN		at Miami (FL)	L 68–74	16–7 (5–6)	BankUnited Center (6,620); Coral Gables, FL
02/12/2017; 6:30 pm, ESPNU		No. 12 Virginia; Commonwealth Clash	W 80–78 ^{2OT}	17–7 (6–6)	Cassell Coliseum (9,567); Blacksburg, VA
02/14/2017; 7:00 pm, ESPN2		at Pittsburgh	W 66–63	18–7 (7–6)	Petersen Events Center (7,835); Pittsburgh, PA
02/18/2017; 1:00 pm, ACCN		at No. 8 Louisville	L 90–94	18–8 (7–7)	KFC Yum! Center (21,524); Louisville, KY
02/21/2017; 7:00 pm, ESPNU		Clemson	W 71–70	19–8 (8–7)	Cassell Coliseum (7,179); Blacksburg, VA
02/25/2017; 4:00 pm, RSN		at Boston College	W 91–75	20–8 (9–7)	Conte Forum (6,311); Chestnut Hill, MA
02/27/2017; 9:00 pm, ESPN2		No. 25 Miami (FL)	W 66–61	21–8 (10–7)	Cassell Coliseum (6,962); Blacksburg, VA
03/04/2017; 4:30 pm, RSN		Wake Forest	L 84–89	21–9 (10–8)	Cassell Coliseum (9,567); Blacksburg, VA
ACC tournament
03/08/2017; 7:00 pm, ESPN2	(7)	vs. (10) Wake Forest; Second Round	W 99–90	22–9	Barclays Center (17,732); Brooklyn, NY
03/09/2017; 7:00 pm, ESPN	(7)	vs. (2) Florida State; Quarterfinals	L 68–74	22–10	Barclays Center (17,732); Brooklyn, NY
NCAA tournament
03/16/2017*; 9:40 pm, CBS	(9 E)	vs. (8 E) No. 25 Wisconsin; First Round	L 74–84	22–11	KeyBank Center (17,619); Buffalo, NY
*Non-conference game. ^{#}Rankings from AP Poll. (#) Tournament seedings in parentheses. E=East Region. All times are in Eastern Time.

== Rankings ==
Ranking movements Legend: ██ Increase in ranking ██ Decrease in ranking — = Not ranked RV = Received votes
	Week																			
Poll	Pre	1	2	3	4	5	6	7	8	9	10	11	12	13	14	15	16	17	18	Final
AP	RV	RV	RV	RV	RV	RV	RV	RV	RV	21	RV	—	RV	RV	—	RV	RV	—	RV	Not released
Coaches	RV	RV	RV	RV	RV	RV	RV	RV	RV	23	RV	—	—	—	—	—	—	RV	—	

*AP does not release post-NCAA tournament rankings
