= T. J. Gibbs =

American basketball player and coach (born 1997)

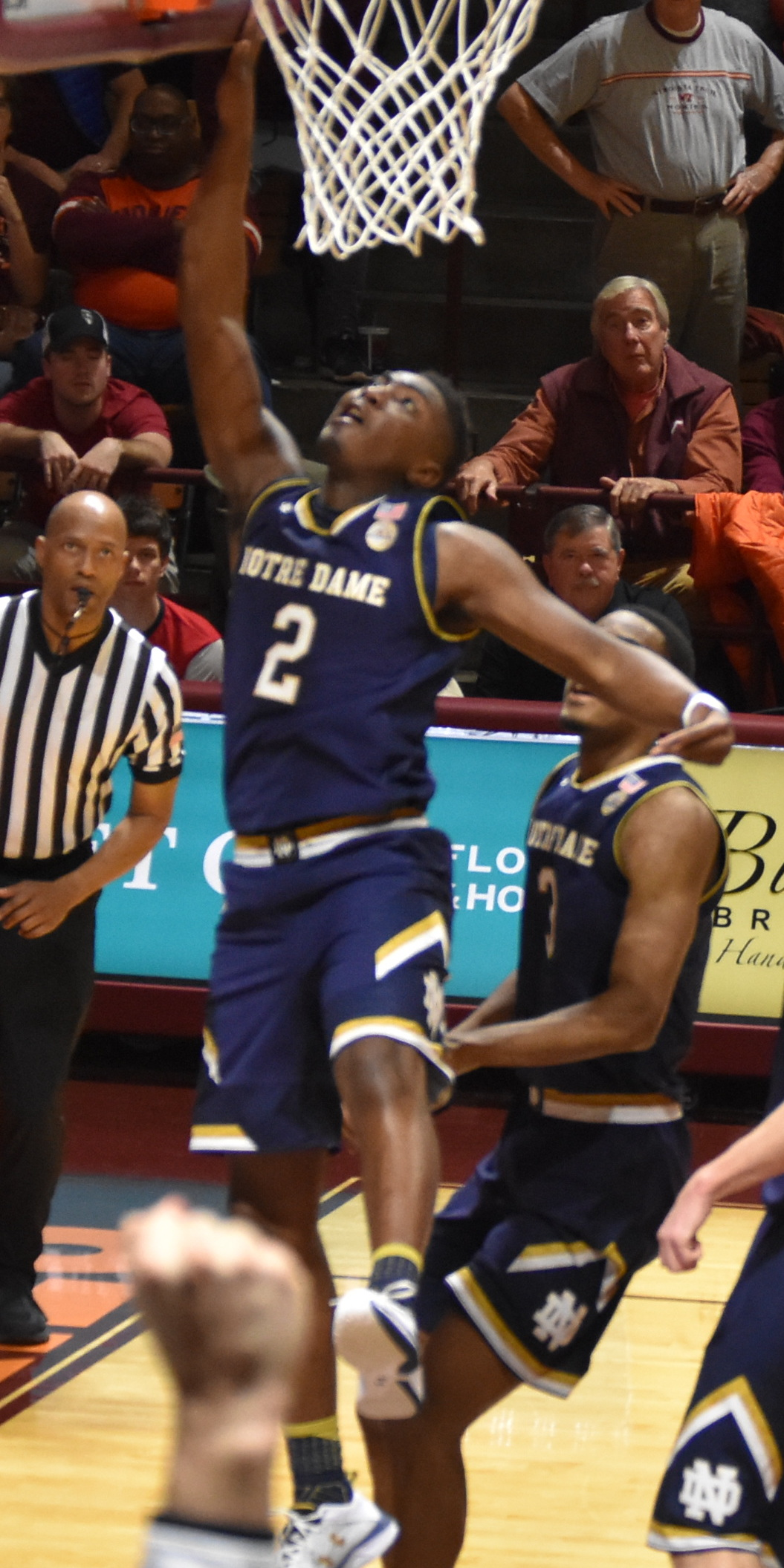
- Gibbs in 2017

UConn Huskies
- Title: Graduate assistant
- League: Big East Conference

Personal information
- Born: October 9, 1997 (age 29)
- Listed height: 6 ft 3 in (1.91 m)
- Listed weight: 185 lb (84 kg)

Career information
- High school: Seton Hall Prep (West Orange, New Jersey)
- College: Notre Dame (2016–2020)
- NBA draft: 2020: undrafted
- Playing career: 2021–2024
- Position: Point guard
- Coaching career: 2025–present

Career history

Playing
- 2021–2022: Krka
- 2022–2023: Phoenix Galați
- 2023: Artland Dragons
- 2024: Galomar

Coaching
- 2025–present: UConn (GA)

Temple Dupree "T. J." Gibbs Jr. (born October 9, 1997) is an American basketball coach and former professional player who is a graduate assistant for the UConn Huskies of the Big East Conference. He played college basketball for the Notre Dame Fighting Irish.

== Early life and high school career ==
A native of Scotch Plains, New Jersey, Gibbs began playing basketball at the age of eight. In middle school, he scored 30 points in the first half of a tournament. Gibbs attended Seton Hall Prep. He averaged 18.6 points per game as a sophomore. Gibbs averaged 19.9 points, 4 rebounds, 3.2 assists and 1.7 steals per game as a junior, earning Second Team All-State recognition. As a senior, he averaged 20.6 points, 4.2 rebounds, 3.6 assists and 2.4 steals per game. Gibbs finished as Seton Hall Prep’s all-time leading scorer with 1,987 points. A consensus four-star recruit, he committed to playing college basketball for Notre Dame, choosing the Fighting Irish over offers from Seton Hall, Oklahoma, Rutgers, Providence, Georgetown and Boston College.

== College career ==
As a freshman, Gibbs averaged 4.7 points and 1.7 assists per game. During the offseason, he focused on losing weight and improving his nutrition, working with conditioning coach Tony Rolinski. On February 6, 2018, he scored a career-high 28 points in a 96–85 win against Boston College. Gibbs became a primary scorer for Notre Dame as a sophomore due to injuries to Bonzie Colson and Matt Farrell. He averaged 15.3 points and 3 assists per game as a sophomore. Gibbs averaged 13.4 points, 3.4 assists, 1.2 steals per game as a junior. As a senior, Gibbs averaged 13.3 points, 3.3 assists and 2.2 rebounds per game.

== Professional career ==
On August 19, 2021, Gibbs signed his first professional contract with Krka of the Slovenian League.

== Career statistics ==
Legend
GP	Games played	GS	Games started	MPG	Minutes per game
FG%	Field goal percentage	3P%	3-point field goal percentage	FT%	Free throw percentage
RPG	Rebounds per game	APG	Assists per game	SPG	Steals per game
BPG	Blocks per game	PPG	Points per game	**Bold**	Career high

=== College ===
Year	Team	GP	GS	MPG	FG%	3P%	FT%	RPG	APG	SPG	BPG	PPG
2016–17	Notre Dame	**36**	1	15.0	.375	.321	.831	1.5	1.7	.7	**.1**	4.7
2017–18	Notre Dame	**36**	**36**	**37.4**	.411	.403	.838	**2.8**	3.0	1.0	**.1**	**15.3**
2018–19	Notre Dame	32	32	36.1	.347	.318	.757	1.9	**3.4**	**1.2**	**.1**	13.4
2019–20	Notre Dame	32	32	35.0	**.421**	**.420**	**.880**	2.2	3.3	1.0	**.1**	13.3
Career		136	101	30.6	.390	.373	.821	2.1	2.8	1.0	.1	11.6

== Personal life ==
Gibbs is the son of Temple Gibbs Sr. His older brothers Ashton and Sterling are also professional basketball players. Growing up, they were forbidden from playing one-on-one after Ashton fouled T. J. and he needed stitches on his lip.
