= 2015–16 Atlantic Coast Conference men's basketball season =

- League: NCAA Division I
- Sport: Basketball
- Teams: 15
- TV partner(s): ACCN, ESPN, Raycom Sports, Regional Sports Networks, CBS

Regular season
- First place: North Carolina Tar Heels
- Season MVP: Malcolm Brogdon

ACC tournament
- Champions: North Carolina Tar Heels
- Finals MVP: Joel Berry II

Atlantic Coast Conference men's basketball seasons
- ← 2014–15 2016–17 →

2015–16 ACC men's basketball standings
	Conf.				Overall
Team	W		L	PCT	W		L	PCT
No. 3 North Carolina †	14	–	4	.778	33	–	7	.825
No. 4 Virginia	13	–	5	.722	29	–	8	.784
No. 10 Miami (FL)	13	–	5	.722	27	–	8	.771
No. 16 Louisville*	12	–	6	.667	23	–	8	.742
Notre Dame	11	–	7	.611	24	–	12	.667
No. 19 Duke	11	–	7	.611	25	–	11	.694
Virginia Tech	10	–	8	.556	20	–	15	.571
Clemson	10	–	8	.556	17	–	14	.548
Pittsburgh	9	–	9	.500	21	–	12	.636
Syracuse	9	–	9	.500	23	–	14	.622
Georgia Tech	8	–	10	.444	21	–	15	.583
Florida State	8	–	10	.444	20	–	14	.588
NC State	5	–	13	.278	16	–	17	.485
Wake Forest	2	–	16	.111	11	–	20	.355
Boston College	0	–	18	.000	7	–	25	.219
† 2016 ACC tournament winner * Ineligible for both the 2016 ACC tournament and the 2016 NCAA tournament due to self-imposed postseason ban. Rankings from AP poll

The 2015–16 Atlantic Coast Conference men's basketball season began with practices in October 2015, followed by the start of the 2015–16 NCAA Division I men's basketball season in November. Conference play started in late December 2015 and will conclude in March with the 2016 ACC men's basketball tournament at the Verizon Center in Washington, D.C.

== Preseason ==
ACC recruits at the 2015 McDonald's All-American Boys Game

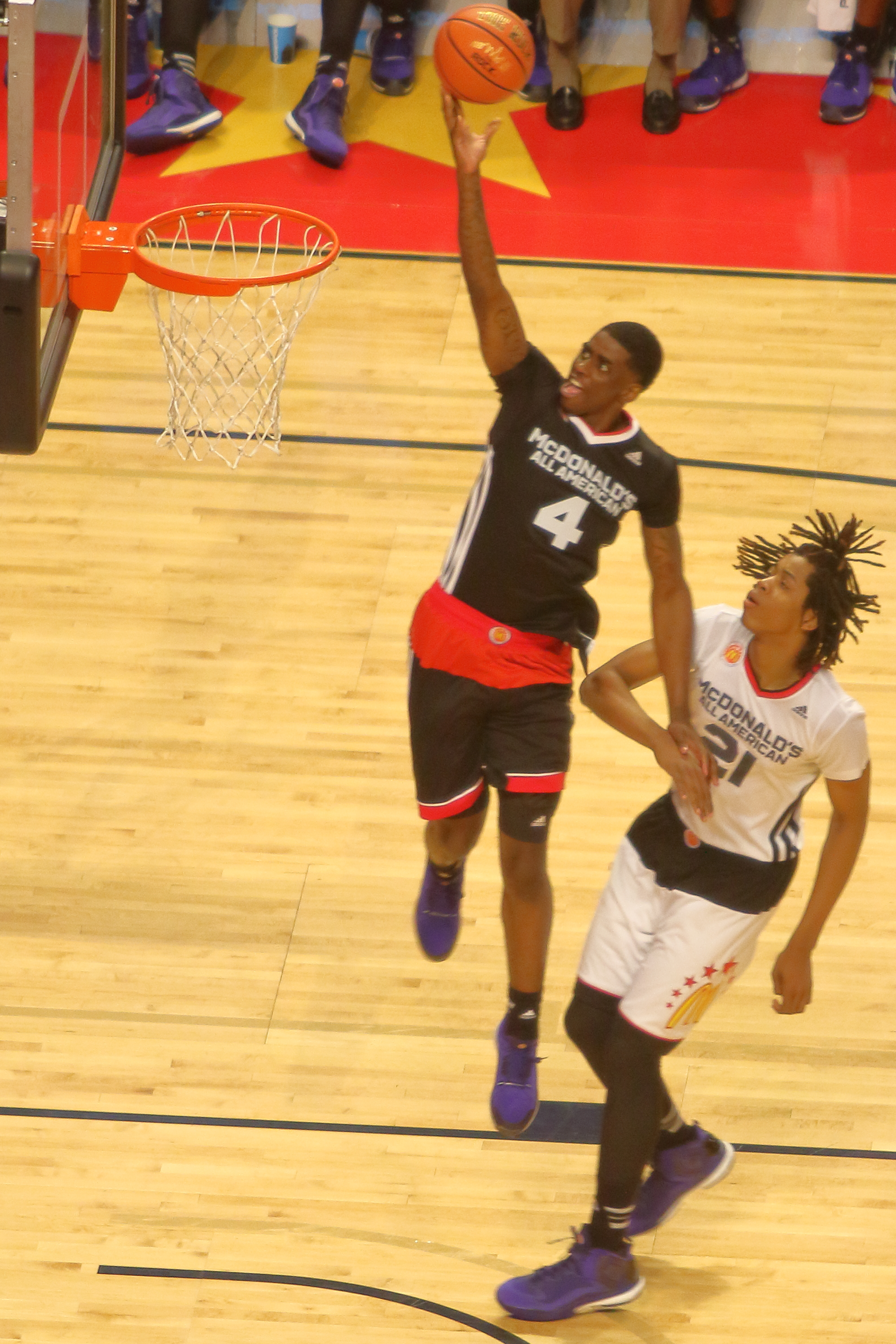
Dwayne Bacon, FSU

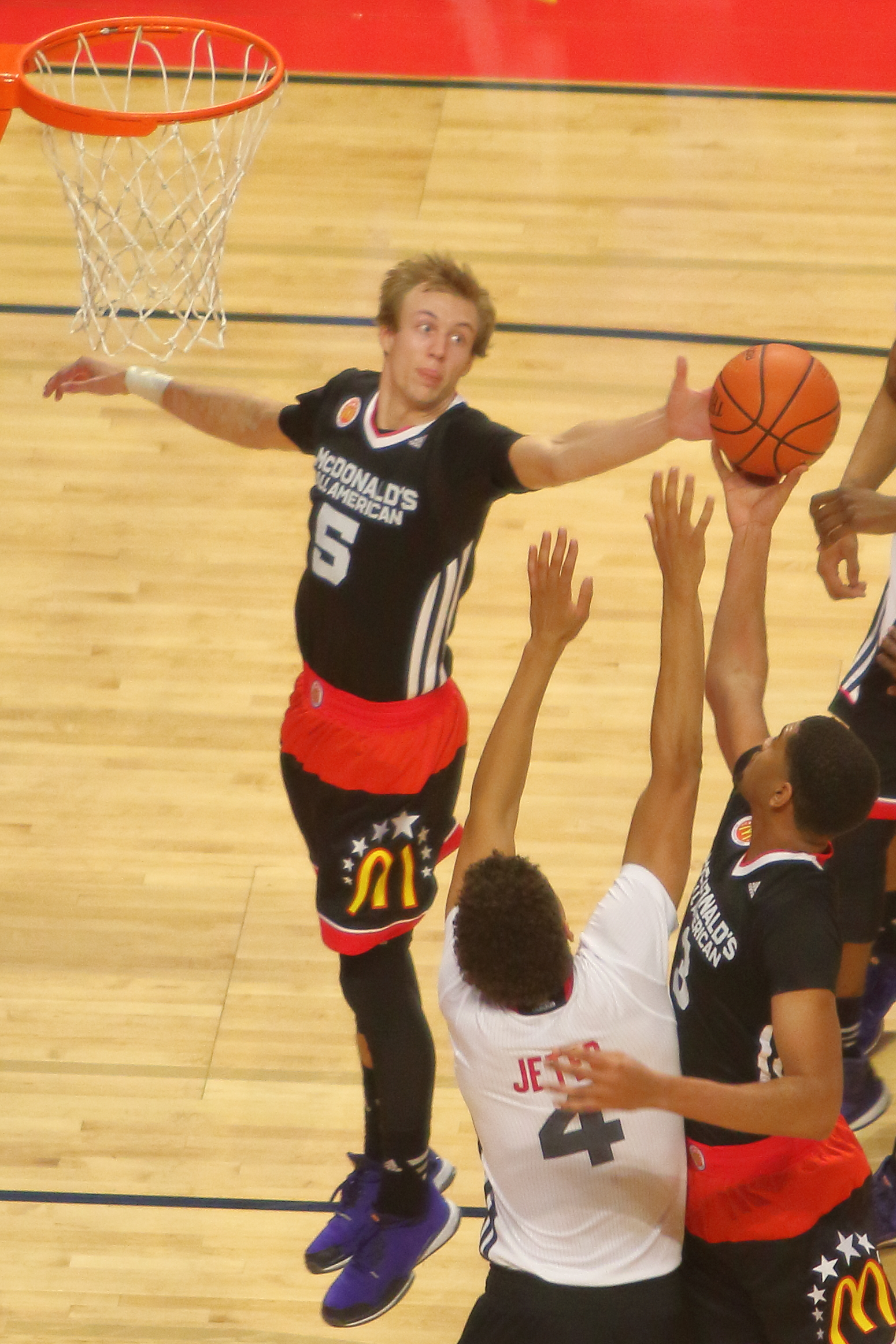
Luke Kennard, Duke

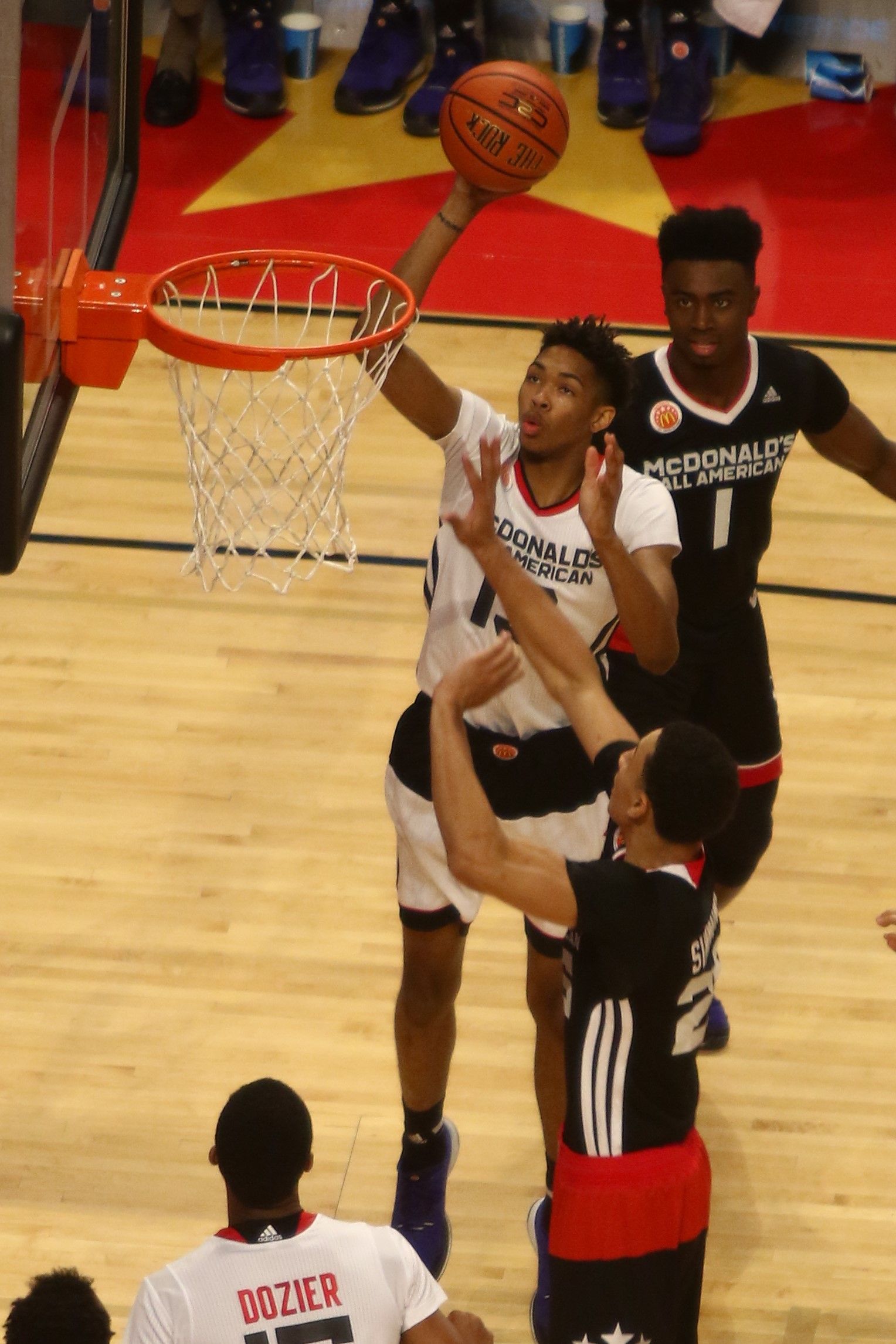
Brandon Ingram, Duke

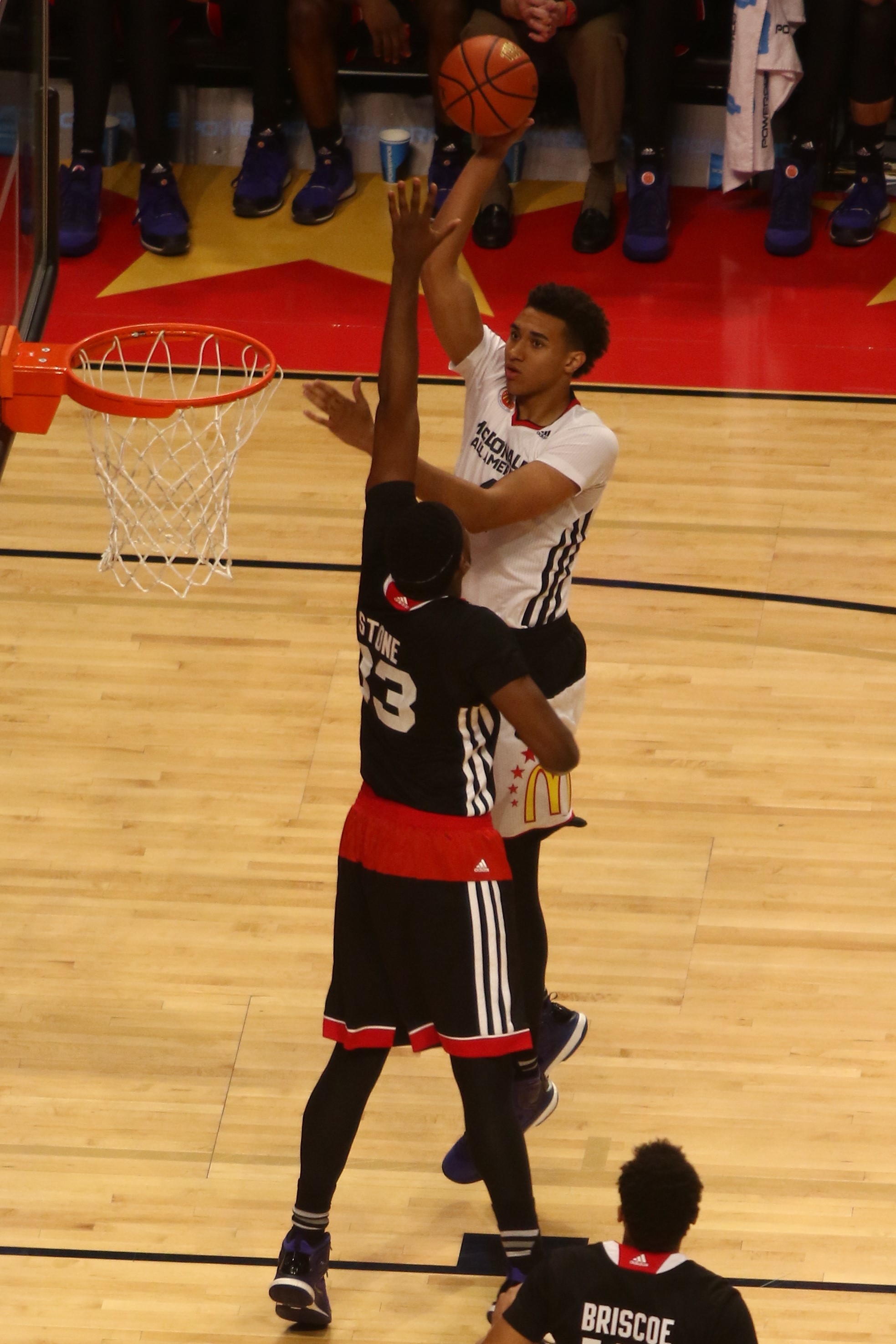
Chase Jeter, Duke

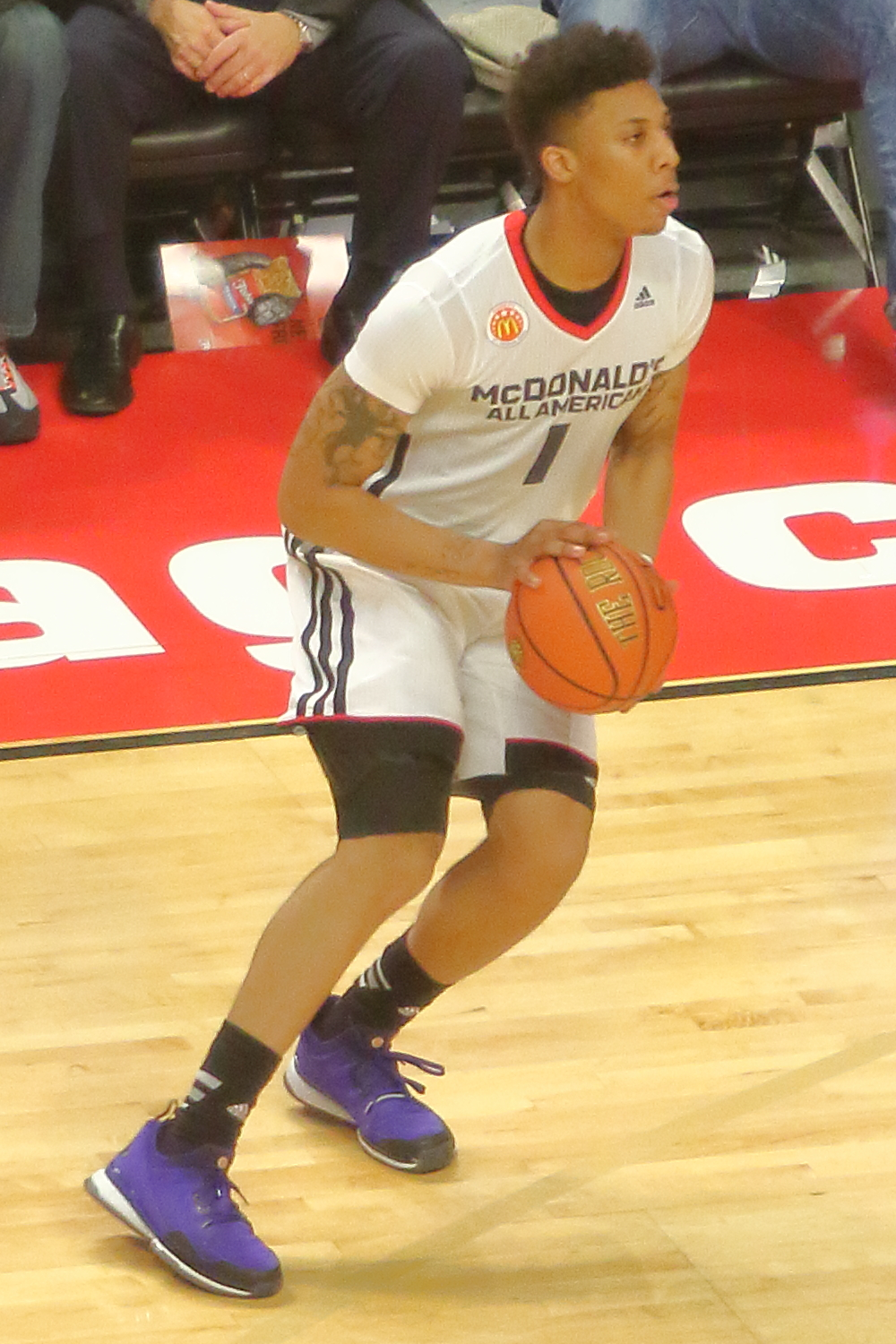
Malachi Richardson, Syr

== Rankings ==
Legend
Increase in ranking
Decrease in ranking
Not ranked previous week

		Pre	Wk 2	Wk 3	Wk 4	Wk 5	Wk 6	Wk 7	Wk 8	Wk 9	Wk 10	Wk 11	Wk 12	Wk 13	Wk 14	Wk 15	Wk 16	Wk 17	Wk 18	Wk 19	Final
Boston College	AP																				
Boston College	C																				
Clemson	AP											RV	RV								
Clemson	C											RV	RV	RV	RV						
Duke	AP	5	5	6	7	8	7	15	15	14	9	20	24	RV	RV	20	15	17	19	19	
Duke	C	4	4	3	5	5	6	10	12	10	6	12	20	RV	RV	19	18	21	21	20	18
Florida State	AP	RV	RV																		
Florida State	C	RV	RV																		
Georgia Tech	AP																				
Georgia Tech	C																				
Louisville	AP	RV	RV	RV	24	22	19	16	18	16	21	17	16	19	13	18	11	11	14	16	
Louisville	C	RV	RV	RV	22	19	16	15	18	16	20	16	14	18	RV						
Miami	AP	RV	RV	15	21	17	15	13	13	12	8	15	15	17	12	11	12	7	11	11	
Miami	C	RV	RV	19	21	20	19	16	15	11	9	14	13	15	11	10	11	7	11	11	8
North Carolina	AP	1	1	9	9	3	11	7	7	6	5	2	2	2	9	5	7	8	7	3	
North Carolina	C	2	1	8	9	3	11	7	8	7	5	2	1	1	8	4	6	8	7	3	2
NC State	AP	RV																			
NC State	C	RV	RV																		
Notre Dame	AP	19	18	17	RV	RV	RV					RV	25	RV	RV	19	23	RV			
Notre Dame	C	18	18	18	RV		RV	RV	RV				RV	RV	RV	18	20	RV			17
Pittsburgh	AP				RV	RV	RV	RV	RV	24	20	RV	RV	RV							
Pittsburgh	C				RV	RV	RV	RV	25	21	17	20	23	RV	RV	RV	RV	RV			
Syracuse	AP				14	RV	RV									RV					
Syracuse	C				19	RV	RV									RV					10
Virginia	AP	6	6	12	10	10	8	5	5	4	13	13	11	9	7	7	3	4	4	4	
Virginia	C	6	6	12	10	10	9	5	5	4	11	13	12	9	7	8	3	4	4	5	5
Virginia Tech	AP																				
Virginia Tech	C																				
Wake Forest	AP																				
Wake Forest	C																				

== Regular season ==
=== Conference matrix ===
This table summarizes the head-to-head results between teams in conference play. Each team will play 18 conference games, and at least 1 against each opponent.

	Boston College	Clemson	Duke	Florida State	Georgia Tech	Louisville	Miami	North Carolina	NC State	Notre Dame	Pittsburgh	Syracuse	Virginia	Virginia Tech	Wake Forest
vs. Boston College	–	2–0	1–0	1–0	1–0	1–0	1–0	2–0	1–0	2–0	1–0	2-0	1-0	1–0	1–0
vs. Clemson	0–2	–	0-1	1–1	1–1	0–1	0–1	1–0	1–0	1–0	0–1	0–1	2-0	1–0	0–1
vs. Duke	0–1	1-0	–	0–1	0–1	1–1	1–0	1–1	0–2	1–0	1–0	1–0	0-1	0–1	0–2
vs. Florida State	0–1	1–1	1–0	–	1–0	1–0	2–0	1–0	0-2	0–1	1–0	1–1	0-1	1–0	0–1
vs. Georgia Tech	0–1	1–1	1–0	0–1	–	2–0	1–0	1–0	0–1	1-1	1–1	1–0	0-1	1–0	0–1
vs. Louisville	0–1	1–0	1–1	0–1	0–2	–	1–0	0–1	0–1	1–0	0–2	0–1	2-0	0–1	0–1
vs. Miami	0–1	1–0	0–1	0–2	0–1	0–1	–	1–0	1–0	0–2	0–1	0–1	1-1	1–1	0–1
vs. North Carolina	0–2	0–1	1–1	0–1	0–1	1–0	0–1	–	0-2	1–0	0–1	0–2	1-0	0–1	0–1
vs. NC State	0–1	0–1	2–0	2-0	1–0	1–0	0–1	2–0	–	1–0	0–1	1–0	1-0	1–0	1–1
vs. Notre Dame	0–2	0–1	0–1	1–0	1-1	0–1	2–0	0–1	0–1	–	1–0	1–0	1-0	0–1	0–2
vs. Pittsburgh	0–1	1–0	0–1	0–1	1–1	2–0	1–0	1–0	1–0	0–1	–	0–2	1-0	1–1	0–1
vs. Syracuse	0-2	1–0	0–1	1–1	0–1	1–0	1–0	2–0	0–1	0–1	2–0	–	1-0	0–1	0–1
vs. Virginia	0–1	0–2	1–0	1–0	1–0	0–2	1–1	0–1	0–1	0–1	0–1	0–1	–	1–1	0–1
vs. Virginia Tech	0–1	0–1	1–0	0–1	0–1	1–0	1–1	1–0	0–1	1–0	1–1	1–0	1-1	–	0-2
vs. Wake Forest	0-1	1–0	2–0	1–0	1–0	1–0	1–0	1–0	1-1	2–0	1–0	1–0	1-0	2-0	–
Total	0-18	10-8	11-7	8-10	8-10	12-6	13-5	14-4	5-13	11-7	9-9	9-9	13-5	10-8	2-16

== Postseason ==
=== ACC tournament ===
- March 8–12, 2016 Atlantic Coast Conference Basketball Tournament, Verizon Center, Washington, D.C.

First round Tuesday, March 8 ESPN2/ACCN
12	NC State	75
13	Wake Forest	72
11	Florida State	88
14	Boston College	66

Second round Wednesday, March 9 ESPN/ACCN
8	Pittsburgh	72
9	Syracuse	71
5	Duke	92
12	NC State	89
7	Clemson	85
10	Georgia Tech	88*
6	Virginia Tech	96
11	Florida State	85

Quarterfinals; Thursday, March 10; ESPN/ACCN
1	North Carolina	88
8	Pittsburgh	71
4	Notre Dame	84*
5	Duke	79
2	Virginia	72
10	Georgia Tech	52
3	Miami	88
6	Virginia Tech	82

Semifinals; Friday, March 11; ESPN/ACCN
1	North Carolina	78
4	Notre Dame	47
2	Virginia	73
3	Miami	68

Championship; Saturday, March 12; ESPN/ACCN
1	North Carolina	61
2	Virginia	57

* Denotes Overtime Game

AP Rankings at time of tournament

=== NCAA tournament ===
Seed	Region	School	First Four	2nd round	3rd round	Sweet 16	Elite Eight	Final Four	Championship
1	East	North Carolina		W, 83-67 vs. #16 Florida Gulf Coast – (Raleigh)	W, 85-66 vs. #9 Providence – ([Raleigh)	W, 101-86 vs. #5 Indiana – (Philadelphia)	W, 88-74 vs. #6 Notre Dame – (Philadelphia)	W, 83-66 vs. #10 Syracuse – (Houston)	L, 74-77 vs. #10 Villanova – (Houston)
1	Midwest	Virginia		W, 81-45 vs. #16 Hampton – (Raleigh)	W, 77-69 vs. #9 Butler – (Raleigh)	W, 84-71 vs. #4 Iowa State – (Chicago)	L, 62-68 vs. #10 Syracuse – (Chicago)		
3	South	Miami		W, 79-72 vs. #14 Buffalo – (Providence)	W, 65-57 vs. #11 Wichita State – (Providence)	L, 69-92 vs. #2 Villanova – (Louisville)			
4	West	Duke		W, 93-85 vs. #13 UNC Wilmington – (Providence)	W, 71-64 vs. #12 Yale – (Providence)	L, 68-82 vs. #1 Oregon – (Anaheim)			
6	East	Notre Dame		W, 70-63 vs. #11 Michigan – (Brooklyn)	W, 76-75 vs. #14 Stephen F. Austin – (Brooklyn)	W, 61-56 vs. #7 Wisconsin – (Philadelphia)	L, 74-88 vs. #1 North Carolina – (Philadelphia)		
10	East	Pittsburgh		L, 43-47 vs. #7 Wisconsin – (St. Louis)					
10	Midwest	Syracuse		W, 70-51 vs. #7 Dayton – (St. Louis)	W, 75-50 vs. #15 Middle Tennessee – (St. Louis)	W, 63-60 vs. #11 Gonzaga – (Chicago)	W, 68-62 vs. #1 Virginia – (Chicago)	L, 66-83 vs. #1 North Carolina – (Houston)	

=== National Invitation tournament ===
Seed	Bracket	School	1st round	2nd round	Quarterfinals	Semifinals	Championship
3	St. Bonaventure	Virginia Tech	W, 86-81 OT vs. #6 Princeton – (Blacksburg)	L, 77–80 vs. #2 BYU – (Provo)			
4	Valparaiso	Florida State	W, 84-74 vs. #5 Davidson – (Tallahassee)	L, 69-81 vs. #1 Valparaiso – (Valparaiso)			
4	South Carolina	Georgia Tech	W, 82-64 vs. #5 Houston – (Atlanta)	W, 83–66 vs. #1 South Carolina – (Columbia)	L, 72–56 vs. #2 San Diego State – (San Diego)		

== Honors and awards ==
2016 ACC Men's Basketball Individual Awards
Award	Recipient(s)
Player of the Year	Malcolm Brogdon, G., VIRGINIA
Coach of the Year	Jim Larranaga, MIAMI
Defensive Player of the Year	Malcolm Brogdon, G., VIRGINIA
Rookie of the Year	Brandon Ingram, F., DUKE
Most Improved Player of the Year	Jaron Blossomgame, F., CLEMSON
Sixth Man of the Year	Isaiah Hicks, F., NORTH CAROLINA

2016 ACC Men's Basketball All-Conference Teams
First Team	Second Team	Third Team
†Brice Johnson, Sr., F., NORTH CAROLINA †Malcolm Brogdon, Sr., G., VIRGINIA; Cat Barber, Jr., G., N.C. STATE; Grayson Allen, So., G., DUKE; Jaron Blossomgame, Jr., F., CLEMSON	Michael Gbinije, Sr., F., SYRACUSE; Sheldon McClellan, Sr., F., MIAMI; Demetrius Jackson, Jr., G., NOTRE DAME; Damion Lee, Sr., G., LOUISVILLE; Brandon Ingram, Fr., F., DUKE	Marcus Georges-Hunt, Sr., G., GEORGIA TECH; Anthony Gill, Sr., F., VIRGINIA; Zach Auguste, Sr., F., NOTRE DAME; Michael Young, Jr., F., PITTSBURGH; Angel Rodríguez, Sr., G., MIAMI
† - denotes unanimous selection

== NBA draft ==
The ACC had 9 players drafted in the 2016 NBA draft. 4 players were drafted in the first round, and 5 players were drafted in the second round.

PG	Point guard	SG	Shooting guard	SF	Small forward	PF	Power forward	C	Center

Player	Team	Round	Pick #	Position	School
Brandon Ingram	Los Angeles Lakers	1st	2	SF	Duke
Malik Beasley	Denver Nuggets	1st	19	SG	Florida State
Malachi Richardson	Charlotte Hornets	1st	22	SG	Syracuse
Brice Johnson	Los Angeles Clippers	1st	25	PF	North Carolina
Malcolm Brogdon	Milwaukee Bucks	2nd	36	PG/SG	Virginia
Chinanu Onuaku	Houston Rockets	2nd	37	PF/C	Louisville
Demetrius Jackson	Boston Celtics	2nd	45	PG	Notre Dame
Michael Gbinije	Detroit Pistons	2nd	49	SF	Syracuse
Marcus Paige	Brooklyn Nets	2nd	55	PG	North Carolina
