= 2016–17 NC State Wolfpack men's basketball team =

American college basketball season

2016–17 NC State Wolfpack men's basketball
- Conference: Atlantic Coast Conference
- Record: 0–17, 15 wins vacated (0–14 ACC)
- Head coach: Mark Gottfried (6th season)
- Assistant coaches: Orlando Early; Butch Pierre; Heath Schroyer
- Home arena: PNC Arena

2016–17 ACC men's basketball standings
	Conf.				Overall
Team	W		L	PCT	W		L	PCT
No. 5 North Carolina	14	–	4	.778	33	–	7	.825
No. 16 Florida State	12	–	6	.667	26	–	9	.743
No. 14 Notre Dame	12	–	6	.667	26	–	10	.722
No. 10 Louisville	12	–	6	.667	25	–	9	.735
No. 7 Duke †	11	–	7	.611	28	–	9	.757
No. 24 Virginia	11	–	7	.611	23	–	11	.676
Virginia Tech	10	–	8	.556	22	–	11	.667
Miami (FL)	10	–	8	.556	21	–	12	.636
Syracuse	10	–	8	.556	19	–	15	.559
Wake Forest	9	–	9	.500	19	–	14	.576
Georgia Tech	8	–	10	.444	21	–	16	.568
Clemson	6	–	12	.333	17	–	16	.515
NC State	0	–	14	.000	0	–	17	.000[3]
Pittsburgh	4	–	14	.222	16	–	17	.485
Boston College	2	–	16	.111	9	–	23	.281
† 2017 ACC tournament winner Rankings from AP poll

The 2016–17 NC State Wolfpack men's basketball team represented North Carolina State University during the 2016–17 NCAA Division I men's basketball season. The Wolfpack, led by sixth-year head coach Mark Gottfried, played its home games at PNC Arena in Raleigh, North Carolina and were members of the Atlantic Coast Conference (ACC). They finished the season 15–17, 4-14 in ACC play to finish in a tie for 13th place. They lost in the first round of the ACC tournament to Clemson.

On February 16, 2017, head coach Mark Gottfried was fired, but the school allowed him to finish out the season. He finished at NC State with a six-year record of 123–86. On March 17, the school hired UNC Wilmington head coach Kevin Keatts as head coach.

== Previous season ==
The Wolfpack finished the 2015–16 season 16–17, 5–13 in ACC play to finish in 13th place. They defeated Wake Forest in the first round of the ACC tournament before losing in the second round to Duke.

== NCAA Independent Resolution Panel ==
As a result of the NCAA’s investigation into alleged violations in the men’s basketball program, the panel accepted the university's self-imposed punishment that included a fine and reduction in scholarships for the 2021-22 academic year. Additional punishments were imposed by the panel that included vacating the record for the 2016-17 season, an additional scholarship reduction, a one-year probation, a four-week recruiting communications ban and an additional fine.

== Departures ==
Name	Number	Pos.	Height	Weight	Year	Hometown	Notes
Cat Barber	12	G	6'2"	190	Junior	Newport News, VA	Declare for 2016 NBA draft
Caleb Martin	14	G/F	6'7"	215	Sophomore	Mocksville, NC	Transferred to Nevada
Cody Martin	15	G/F	6'7"	210	Sophomore	Mocksville, NC	Transferred to Nevada
Chase Cannon	25	G	6'5"	200	Senior	Morehead City, NC	Walk-on; graduated

== Class of 2016 signees ==
College recruiting
Name	Hometown	School	Height	Weight	Commit date
Dennis Smith Jr. PG	Fayetteville, NC	Trinity Christian School	6 ft 3 in (1.91 m)	190 lb (86 kg)	Sep 10, 2015
Dennis Smith Jr. PG	Recruit ratings: Scout: Rivals: 247Sports: ESPN:				
Markell Johnson #9 PG	Cleveland, OH	East Tech High School	6 ft 1 in (1.85 m)	175 lb (79 kg)	Jun 20, 2016
Markell Johnson #9 PG	Recruit ratings: Scout: Rivals: 247Sports: ESPN:				
Darius Hicks #53 PF	Quitman, MS	22ft Academy	6 ft 7 in (2.01 m)	230 lb (100 kg)	May 12, 2016
Darius Hicks #53 PF	Recruit ratings: Scout: Rivals: 247Sports: ESPN:				
Ömer Yurtseven; C	Istanbul, Turkey	Fenerbahce Istanbul	7 ft 0 in (2.13 m)	228 lb (103 kg)	May 16, 2016
Ömer Yurtseven; C	Recruit ratings: Scout: Rivals: 247Sports: ESPN:				
Ted Kapita; C	Kinshasa, DR Congo	DME Academy	6 ft 9 in (2.06 m)	220 lb (100 kg)	Jun 18, 2016
Ted Kapita; C	Recruit ratings: Scout: Rivals: 247Sports: ESPN:				
Overall recruit ranking:
Note: In many cases, Scout, Rivals, 247Sports, On3, and ESPN may conflict in their listings of height and weight.; In these cases, the average was taken. ESPN grades are on a 100-point scale.; Sources: "2016 NC State Basketball Commits". Scout.; "ESPN". ESPN.; "Scout.com Team Recruiting Rankings". Scout.; "2016 Team Ranking". Rivals.

== Roster ==
2016–17 NC State Wolfpack men's basketball team
Players
Coaches
}

Pos.	#	Name	Height	Weight	Year	Hometown
F	0	Abdul-Malik Abu	6 ft 8 in (2.03 m)	240 lb (109 kg)	Jr	Boston, Massachusetts
F	1	Lennard Freeman (injured) (redshirt)	6 ft 8 in (2.03 m)	267 lb (121 kg)	Sr	Washington, D.C.
G/F	2	Torin Dorn	6 ft 6 in (1.98 m)	208 lb (94 kg)	RS So	Charlotte, North Carolina
G	3	Terry Henderson	6 ft 5 in (1.96 m)	190 lb (86 kg)	RS Sr	Raleigh, North Carolina
G	4	Dennis Smith Jr.	6 ft 3 in (1.91 m)	195 lb (88 kg)	Fr	Fayetteville, North Carolina
F	5	Darius Hicks	6 ft 7 in (2.01 m)	231 lb (105 kg)	Fr	Quitman, Mississippi
G	11	Markell Johnson	6 ft 1 in (1.85 m)	164 lb (74 kg)	Fr	Cleveland, Ohio
G	12	Cameron Gottfried (W)	6 ft 3 in (1.91 m)	183 lb (83 kg)	Jr	Raleigh, North Carolina
G	13	Chris Corchiani, Jr. (W)	6 ft 0 in (1.83 m)	180 lb (82 kg)	So	Raleigh, North Carolina
F/C	14	Ömer Yurtseven	7 ft 0 in (2.13 m)	245 lb (111 kg)	Fr	Istanbul, Turkey
F	15	Chris Brickhouse (W)	6 ft 5 in (1.96 m)	205 lb (93 kg)	Sr	Raleigh, North Carolina
C	21	BeeJay Anya	6 ft 9 in (2.06 m)	344 lb (156 kg)	Sr	Gaithersburg, Maryland
G/F	22	Shaun Kirk	6 ft 8 in (2.03 m)	195 lb (88 kg)	So	Whiteville, North Carolina
F	23	Ted Kapita	6 ft 10 in (2.08 m)	219 lb (99 kg)	Fr	Kinshasa, DR Congo
G/F	24	Maverick Rowan	6 ft 8 in (2.03 m)	220 lb (100 kg)	So	Fort Lauderdale, Florida
G	31	Spencer Newman (W)	6 ft 3 in (1.91 m)	186 lb (84 kg)	Fr	Daphne, Alabama
F/C	42	Tucker Thompson (W)	6 ft 10 in (2.08 m)	248 lb (112 kg)	Jr	Huntersville, North Carolina

Head coach

- Mark Gottfried (Alabama)

Assistant coach(es)

- Orlando Early (Gardner–Webb)
- Butch Pierre (Mississippi State)
- Heath Schroyer (Armstrong State)

Legend

- (C) Team captain
- (S) Suspended
- (I) Ineligible
- (W) Walk-on
- Injured
- Current redshirt

Roster

== Schedule and results ==
Date time, TV	Rank^{#}	Opponent^{#}	Result	Record	High points	High rebounds	High assists	Site (attendance) city, state
Exhibition
Nov 3, 2016*; 7:00 pm		Lynn	W 100–66		22 – Smith	15 – Abu	6 – Smith	PNC Arena (4,809); Raleigh, NC
Nov 7, 2016*; 7:00 pm		Barton	W 112–60		24 – Smith	11 – Dorn	6 – Johnson	PNC Arena (6,434); Raleigh, NC
Non-conference regular season
Nov 11, 2016*; 7:00 pm, ACCN Extra		Georgia Southern	W 81–79	1–0	23 – Henderson	11 – Abu	5 – Smith	PNC Arena (16,226); Raleigh, NC
Nov 13, 2016*; 2:00 pm, ACCN Extra		St. Francis Brooklyn	W 86–61	2–0	21 – Dorn	8 – Kapita	3 – Smith	PNC Arena (14,792); Raleigh, NC
Nov 18, 2016*; 6:00 pm, CBSSN		vs. Montana; Paradise Jam quarterfinals	W 85–72	3–0	25 – Abu	8 – Abu	6 – Johnson	Sports and Fitness Center (2,223); St. Thomas, VI
Nov 20, 2016*; 8:30 pm, CBSSN		vs. No. 22 Creighton; Paradise Jam semifinals	L 94–112	3–1	28 – Henderson	8 – Abu	7 – Smith	Sports and Fitness Center (2,755); St. Thomas, VI
Nov 21, 2016*; 6:00 pm, CBSSN		vs. Saint Joseph's; Paradise Jam 3rd place game	W 73–63	4–1	24 – Smith	10 – Abu	8 – Smith	Sports and Fitness Center (2,699); St. Thomas, VI
Nov 26, 2016*; 4:00 pm, ACCN Extra		Loyola–Chicago; Paradise Jam On Campus Site	W 79–77	5–1	30 – Smith	6 – Tied	7 – Smith	PNC Arena (15,141); Raleigh, NC
Nov 29, 2016*; 9:00 pm, ESPNU		at Illinois; ACC–Big Ten Challenge	L 74–88	5–2	17 – Dorn	7 – Henderson & Smith	5 – Henderson	State Farm Center (13,481); Champaign, IL
Dec 3, 2016*; 4:30 pm, RSN		Boston University	W 77–73	6–2	23 – Henderson	11 – Dorn	5 – Johnson	PNC Arena (15,986); Raleigh, NC
Dec 10, 2016*; 4:00 pm, RSN		Tennessee State	W 67–55 ^{OT}	7–2	21 – Henderson	14 – Anya	7 – Smith	Reynolds Coliseum (5,500); Raleigh, NC
Dec 15, 2016*; 7:00 pm, ESPNU		Appalachian State	W 97–64	8–2	22 – Smith	10 – Dorn	6 – Smith	PNC Arena (16,417); Raleigh, NC
Dec 18, 2016*; 2:00 pm, ACCN Extra		Fairfield	W 99–78	9–2	25 – Henderson	9 – Abu	9 – Smith	PNC Arena (15,564); Raleigh, NC
Dec 22, 2016*; 7:00 pm, ACCN Extra		McNeese State	W 89–57	10–2	23 – Smith	9 – Kapita	6 – Smith	PNC Arena (15,186); Raleigh, NC
Dec 28, 2016*; 7:00 pm, ACCN Extra		Rider	W 99–71	11–2	19 – Smith	12 – Abu	16 – Smith	PNC Arena (16,111); Raleigh, NC
ACC regular season
Dec 31, 2016; 4:30 pm, RSN		at Miami (FL)	L 63–81	11–3 (0–1)	21 – Smith	9 – Abu	5 – Smith	BankUnited Center (6,837); Coral Gables, FL
Jan 4, 2017; 9:00 pm, ACCN		No. 21 Virginia Tech	W 104–78	12–3 (1–1)	27 – Smith	11 – Abu & Smith	11 – Smith	PNC Arena (16,185); Raleigh, NC
Jan 8, 2017; 1:00 pm, ESPN		at No. 14 North Carolina; Carolina–State Game	L 56–107	12–4 (1–2)	11 – 3 tied	9 – Abu	5 – Smith	Dean Smith Center (16,133); Chapel Hill, NC
Jan 11, 2017; 9:00 pm, RSN		at Boston College	L 66–74	12–5 (1–3)	15 – Smith	11 – Abu	4 – Johnson	Conte Forum (3,904); Chestnut Hill, MA
Jan 15, 2017; 6:30 pm, ESPNU		Georgia Tech	L 76–86	12–6 (1–4)	31 – Smith	8 – Smith	6 – Smith	PNC Arena (17,781); Raleigh, NC
Jan 17, 2017; 7:00 pm, ESPNU		Pittsburgh	W 79–74	13–6 (2–4)	21 – Henderson	16 – Yurtseven	7 – Johnson	PNC Arena (15,877); Raleigh, NC
Jan 21, 2017; 7:00 pm, ESPNU		Wake Forest	L 88–93	13–7 (2–5)	20 – Abu	7 – Tied	13 – Smith	PNC Arena (18,823); Raleigh, NC
Jan 23, 2017; 7:00 pm, ESPN		at No. 17 Duke	W 84–82	14–7 (3–5)	32 – Smith	10 – Kapita	6 – Smith	Cameron Indoor Stadium (9,314); Durham, NC
Jan 29, 2017; 1:00 pm, ACCN		at No. 13 Louisville	L 60–85	14–8 (3–6)	13 – Tied	6 – Abu	6 – Smith	KFC Yum! Center (21,650); Louisville, KY
Feb 1, 2017; 7:00 pm, ESPN2		Syracuse	L 93–100 ^{OT}	14–9 (3–7)	31 – Rowan	11 – Smith	15 – Smith	PNC Arena (16,346); Raleigh, NC
Feb 4, 2017; 3:00 pm, ACCN		Miami (FL)	L 79–84	14–10 (3–8)	31 – Smith	5 – Abu	9 – Smith	PNC Arena (17,567); Raleigh, NC
Feb 8, 2017; 7:00 pm, ESPN2		at No. 14 Florida State	L 71–95	14–11 (3–9)	17 – Henderson	6 – Abu	6 – Smith	Donald L. Tucker Civic Center (9,432); Tallahassee, FL
Feb 11, 2017; 12:00 pm, RSN		at Wake Forest	L 58–88	14–12 (3–10)	17 – Smith	11 – Dorn	3 – Smith	LJVM Coliseum (12,935); Winston-Salem, NC
Feb 15, 2017; 8:00 pm, ACCN		No. 10 North Carolina; Carolina–State Game	L 73–97	14–13 (3–11)	27 – Smith	7 – Abu	6 – Smith	PNC Arena (19,500); Raleigh, NC
Feb 18, 2017; 12:00 pm, ESPN		Notre Dame	L 72–81	14–14 (3–12)	16 – Smith	6 – Abu	5 – Johnson	PNC Arena (16,602); Raleigh, NC
Feb 21, 2017; 8:00 pm, ACCN		at Georgia Tech	W 71–69	15–14 (4–12)	21 – Henderson	10 – Abu	3 – Tied	Hank McCamish Pavilion (6,950); Atlanta, GA
Feb 25, 2017; 12:00 pm, ESPN		No. 18 Virginia	L 55–70	15–15 (4–13)	13 – Smith	9 – Abu	4 – Johnson	PNC Arena (16,718); Raleigh, NC
Mar 1, 2017; 8:00 pm, ACCN		at Clemson	L 74–78	15–16 (4–14)	18 – Abu	8 – Smith	5 – Smith	Littlejohn Coliseum (6,853); Clemson, SC
ACC Tournament
Mar 7, 2017; 12:00 pm, ESPN2	(13)	vs. (12) Clemson; First round	L 61–75	15–17	14 – Abu & Rowan	8 – Tied	3 – Smith	Barclays Center (8,656); Brooklyn, NY
*Non-conference game. ^{#}Rankings from AP Poll. (#) Tournament seedings in parentheses. All times are in Eastern Time.
