= 2016–17 Syracuse Orange men's basketball team =

American college basketball season

2016–17 Syracuse Orange men's basketball

NIT, Second Round
- Conference: Atlantic Coast Conference
- Record: 19–15 (10–8 ACC)
- Head coach: Jim Boeheim (41st season)
- Assistant coaches: Mike Hopkins; Adrian Autry; Gerry McNamara
- Home arena: Carrier Dome

2016–17 ACC men's basketball standings
	Conf.				Overall
Team	W		L	PCT	W		L	PCT
No. 5 North Carolina	14	–	4	.778	33	–	7	.825
No. 16 Florida State	12	–	6	.667	26	–	9	.743
No. 14 Notre Dame	12	–	6	.667	26	–	10	.722
No. 10 Louisville	12	–	6	.667	25	–	9	.735
No. 7 Duke †	11	–	7	.611	28	–	9	.757
No. 24 Virginia	11	–	7	.611	23	–	11	.676
Virginia Tech	10	–	8	.556	22	–	11	.667
Miami (FL)	10	–	8	.556	21	–	12	.636
Syracuse	10	–	8	.556	19	–	15	.559
Wake Forest	9	–	9	.500	19	–	14	.576
Georgia Tech	8	–	10	.444	21	–	16	.568
Clemson	6	–	12	.333	17	–	16	.515
NC State	0	–	14	.000	0	–	17	.000[3]
Pittsburgh	4	–	14	.222	16	–	17	.485
Boston College	2	–	16	.111	9	–	23	.281
† 2017 ACC tournament winner Rankings from AP poll

The 2016–17 Syracuse Orange men's basketball team represented Syracuse University during the 2016–17 NCAA Division I men's basketball season. The Orange were led by 41st-year head coach Jim Boeheim and played their home games at the Carrier Dome in Syracuse, New York. They were fourth-year members of the Atlantic Coast Conference (ACC). They finished the season 19–15, 10–8 in ACC play to finish in a three-way tie for seventh place. They lost in the second round of the ACC tournament to Miami (FL). They were one of the last four teams not selected for the NCAA tournament and thus received a No. 1 seed in the National Invitation Tournament where they defeated UNC Greensboro in the first round to advance to the second round where they lost to Ole Miss.

== Previous season ==
The Orange finished the 2015–16 season 23–14, 9–9 in ACC play to finish in a tie for ninth place. They lost to Pittsburgh in the second round of the ACC tournament. They received an at-large bid to the NCAA tournament as a No. 10 seed where they defeated Dayton, Middle Tennessee, Gonzaga, and Virginia to reach the Final Four for the sixth time in school history. At the Final Four, the Orange lost to North Carolina.

== Departures ==
Name	Number	Pos.	Height	Weight	Year	Hometown	Notes
Michael Gbinije	0	F	6'7"	200	Senior	Richmond, VA	Graduated
Trevor Cooney	10	G	6'4"	195	Senior	Wilmington, DE	Graduated
Kaleb Joseph	14	G	6'3"	180	Sophomore	Nashua, NH	Transferred to Creighton
Malachi Richardson	23	G	6'6"	205	Freshman	Trenton, NJ	Declared for 2016 NBA draft
Chinonso Obokoh	35	C	6'9"	215	Senior	Rochester, NY	Graduated
Christian White	55	G	5'10"	185	Senior	Rochester, NY	Walk-on; graduated

== Recruits ==
College recruiting information
Name	Hometown	School	Height	Weight	Commit date
Tyus Battle #9 SF	Edison, NJ	St. Joseph High School	6 ft 5 in (1.96 m)	220 lb (100 kg)	Jul 13, 2015
Tyus Battle #9 SF	Recruit ratings: Scout: Rivals: (88)				
Matthew Moyer #19 PF	Columbus, OH	South Kent School	6 ft 8 in (2.03 m)	205 lb (93 kg)	Aug 8, 2014
Matthew Moyer #19 PF	Recruit ratings: Scout: Rivals: (82)				
Taurean Thompson #20 PF	Jersey City, NJ	Brewster Academy	6 ft 9 in (2.06 m)	220 lb (100 kg)	Jul 1, 2016
Taurean Thompson #20 PF	Recruit ratings: Scout: Rivals: (82)				
Overall recruit ranking:
Note: In many cases, Scout, Rivals, 247Sports, On3, and ESPN may conflict in their listings of height and weight.; In these cases, the average was taken. ESPN grades are on a 100-point scale.; Sources: "2016 Syracuse Signees". Rivals.; "2016 Syracuse Signees". Scout.; "2016 Syracuse Signees". ESPN.; "Scout.com Team Recruiting Rankings". Scout.; "2016 Team Ranking". Rivals.

=== Incoming transfers ===
Name	Number	Pos.	Height	Weight	Year	Hometown	Previous School
John Gillon	4	G	6'0"	168	RS Senior	Houston, TX	Transferred from Colorado State. Eligible to play immediately since he graduated from Colorado State.
Andrew White	3	F	6'7"	210	RS Senior	Richmond, VA	Transferred from Nebraska. Eligible to play immediately since he graduated from Nebraska.

== Future recruits ==
=== 2017–18 team recruits ===
College recruiting information (2017)
Name	Hometown	School	Height	Weight	Commit date
Oshae Brissett; SF	Mississauga, Ont, CA	Orangeville Prep	6 ft 6 in (1.98 m)	190 lb (86 kg)	Nov 11, 2016
Oshae Brissett; SF	Recruit ratings: Scout: Rivals: (81)				
Bourama Sidibe; PF	Newark, NJ	St. Benedict Prep	6 ft 9 in (2.06 m)	220 lb (100 kg)	Nov 21, 2016
Bourama Sidibe; PF	Recruit ratings: Scout: Rivals: (82)				
Howard Washington; PG	Buffalo, NY	Athlete Institute Basketball Academy	6 ft 2 in (1.88 m)	172 lb (78 kg)	Mar 16, 2017
Howard Washington; PG	Recruit ratings: Scout: Rivals: (80)				
Marek Dolezaj; SF	Slovakia	N/A	6 ft 9 in (2.06 m)	175 lb (79 kg)	May 23, 2017
Marek Dolezaj; SF	Recruit ratings: Scout: Rivals: (N/A)				
Overall recruit ranking:
Note: In many cases, Scout, Rivals, 247Sports, On3, and ESPN may conflict in their listings of height and weight.; In these cases, the average was taken. ESPN grades are on a 100-point scale.; Sources: "2017 Syracuse Signees". Rivals.; "2017 Syracuse Signees". Scout.; "2017 Syracuse Signees". ESPN.; "Scout.com Team Recruiting Rankings". Scout.; "2017 Team Ranking". Rivals.

== Roster ==
2016–17 Syracuse Orange men's basketball team
Players
Coaches

Pos.	#	Name	Height	Weight	Year	Previous school	Hometown
G	1	Franklin Howard	6 ft 4 in (1.93 m)	190 lb (86 kg)	So	Paul IV	Suitland, Maryland
F	2	Matthew Moyer	6 ft 8 in (2.03 m)	215 lb (98 kg)	Fr	South Kent School	Columbus, Ohio
F	3	Andrew White	6 ft 7 in (2.01 m)	210 lb (95 kg)	GS	Miller School/Nebraska	Richmond, Virginia
G	4	John Gillon	6 ft 0 in (1.83 m)	168 lb (76 kg)	RS Sr	Strake Jesuit Prep/Colorado State	Houston, Texas
F	5	Mike Sutton (W)	6 ft 2 in (1.88 m)	194 lb (88 kg)	Jr	Norwich	Norwich, New York
G	10	Braedon Bayer (W)	6 ft 4 in (1.93 m)	185 lb (84 kg)	So	Trinity-Pawling School/Grinnell College	Lagrangeville, New York
G	11	Adrian Autry (W)	6 ft 0 in (1.83 m)	182 lb (83 kg)	So	Jamesville-DeWitt	Jamesville, New York
F	12	Taurean Thompson	6 ft 10 in (2.08 m)	220 lb (100 kg)	Fr	Brewster Academy	Jersey City, New Jersey
C	13	Paschal Chukwu	7 ft 2 in (2.18 m)	226 lb (103 kg)	RS So	Fairfield Prep	Westport, Connecticut
G	14	Evan Dourdas (W)	6 ft 0 in (1.83 m)	160 lb (73 kg)	So	Jamesville-DeWitt	Jamesville, New York
F	20	Tyler Lydon	6 ft 8 in (2.03 m)	210 lb (95 kg)	So	New Hampton School	Elizaville, New York
F	21	Tyler Roberson	6 ft 8 in (2.03 m)	226 lb (103 kg)	Sr	Roselle Catholic	Union, New Jersey
G	24	Shaun Belbey (W)	5 ft 10 in (1.78 m)	165 lb (75 kg)	So	Christian Brothers Academy	Brick, New Jersey
G	25	Tyus Battle	6 ft 6 in (1.98 m)	220 lb (100 kg)	Fr	St. Joseph	Edison, New Jersey
C	32	DaJuan Coleman	6 ft 9 in (2.06 m)	268 lb (122 kg)	GS	Jamesville-DeWitt	Jamesville, New York
G	33	Jonathan Radnor (W)	5 ft 10 in (1.78 m)	168 lb (76 kg)	So	Berkley	Huntington Woods, Michigan
F	34	Doyin Akintobi-Adeyeye	6 ft 6 in (1.98 m)	230 lb (104 kg)	Sr	Uniondale	Uniondale, New York
G	35	Ray Featherston (W)	5 ft 9 in (1.75 m)	155 lb (70 kg)	Fr	Choate Rosemary Hall	Wallingford, Connecticut
G	54	Ky Feldman (W)	5 ft 10 in (1.78 m)	150 lb (68 kg)	So	Agoura	Agoura Hills, California

Head coach

- Jim Boeheim, 41st yr. (Syracuse, 1966)

Assistant coach(es)

- Mike Hopkins, 21st yr. (Syracuse, 1993)
- Gerry McNamara, 8th yr. (Syracuse, 2007)
- Adrian Autry, 6th yr. (Syracuse, 1994)

Legend

- (C) Team captain
- (S) Suspended
- (I) Ineligible
- (W) Walk-on
- Injured
- Current redshirt

Roster

== Schedule and results ==
Date time, TV	Rank^{#}	Opponent^{#}	Result	Record	High points	High rebounds	High assists	Site (attendance) city, state
Exhibition
Nov 1, 2016*; 7:00 pm	No. 19	IUP	W 83–65		16 – Battle	10 – Lydon	9 – Gillon	Carrier Dome (6,630); Syracuse, NY
Nov 8, 2016*; 7:00 pm	No. 19	Le Moyne	W 97–64		24 – White	10 – Lydon	7 – Howard	Carrier Dome (8,252); Syracuse, NY
Non-conference regular season
Nov 11, 2016*; 7:00 pm, ACCN Extra	No. 19	Colgate	W 83–55	1–0	18 – Roberson	7 – Thompson	9 – Howard	Carrier Dome (23,844); Syracuse, NY
Nov 15, 2016*; 7:00 pm, ACCN Extra	No. 18	Holy Cross; Brooklyn Hoops Holiday Invitational	W 90–46	2–0	17 – Lydon	6 – 3 tied	9 – Gillon	Carrier Dome (21,405); Syracuse, NY
Nov 18, 2016*; 7:00 pm, ACCN Extra	No. 18	Monmouth; Brooklyn Hoops Holiday Invitational	W 71–50	3–0	18 – White	8 – Coleman	6 – Howard	Carrier Dome (22,636); Syracuse, NY
Nov 22, 2016*; 7:00 pm, ACCN Extra	No. 18	South Carolina State; Brooklyn Hoops Holiday Invitational	W 101–59	4–0	15 – White	12 – Roberson	11 – Howard	Carrier Dome (17,073); Syracuse, NY
Nov 26, 2016*; 2:00 pm, ASN	No. 18	vs. South Carolina; Brooklyn Hoops Holiday Invitational	L 50–64	4–1	18 – Lydon	6 – Roberson	3 – Tied	Barclays Center (8,733); Brooklyn, NY
Nov 29, 2016*; 7:30 pm, ESPN	No. 22	at No. 17 Wisconsin; ACC–Big Ten Challenge	L 60–77	4–2	14 – White	5 – Tied	4 – Gillon	Kohl Center (17,287); Madison, WI
Dec 3, 2016*; 4:00 pm, ACCN Extra	No. 22	North Florida	W 77–71	5–2	26 – White	9 – Lydon	13 – Howard	Carrier Dome (22,372); Syracuse, NY
Dec 5, 2016*; 7:00 pm, ESPN2		vs. UConn; Tire Pros Classic/Rivalry	L 50–52	5–3	14 – White	15 – Coleman	4 – Howard	Madison Square Garden (15,347); New York City, NY
Dec 10, 2016*; 12:00 pm, RSN		Boston University	W 99–77	6–3	23 – Gillon	7 – Thompson	11 – Howard	Carrier Dome (22,878); Syracuse, NY
Dec 17, 2016*; 12:00 noon, ESPN		Georgetown; Rivalry	L 71–78	6–4	29 – Lydon	9 – Lydon	4 – Howard	Carrier Dome (25,131); Syracuse, NY
Dec 19, 2016*; 7:00 pm, ESPNU		Eastern Michigan	W 105–57	7–4	18 – Battle	8 – Roberson	11 – Howard	Carrier Dome (16,778); Syracuse, NY
Dec 21, 2016*; 7:00 pm, RSN		St. John's	L 60–93	7–5	16 – Lydon	10 – Tied	4 – Gillon	Carrier Dome (18,363); Syracuse, NY
Dec 27, 2016*; 7:00 pm, RSN		Cornell	W 80–56	8–5	20 – Lydon	10 – Lydon	7 – Gillon	Carrier Dome (20,057); Syracuse, NY
ACC regular season
Jan 1, 2017; 12:30 pm, ESPNU		at Boston College	L 81–96	8–6 (0–1)	22 – White	12 – Lydon	4 – Battle	Conte Forum (7,226); Chestnut Hills, MA
Jan 4, 2017; 7:00 pm, RSN		Miami (FL)	W 70–55	9–6 (1–1)	22 – White	10 – White	11 – Gillon	Carrier Dome (17,393); Syracuse, NY
Jan 7, 2017; 12:00 pm, ACCN		Pittsburgh	W 77–66	10–6 (2–1)	21 – White	10 – Roberson	11 – Gillon	Carrier Dome (20,034); Syracuse, NY
Jan 10, 2017; 7:00 pm, ESPNU		at Virginia Tech	L 73–83	10–7 (2–2)	18 – Thompson	10 – Roberson	4 – Howard	Cassell Coliseum (6,047); Blacksburg, VA
Jan 14, 2017; 4:00 pm, RSN		Boston College	W 76–53	11–7 (3–2)	21 – Battle	6 – Tied	6 – Gillon	Carrier Dome (21,626); Syracuse, NY
Jan 16, 2017; 7:00 pm, ESPN		at No. 9 North Carolina	L 68–85	11–8 (3–3)	26 – Lydon	8 – Roberson	6 – Gillon	Dean Smith Center (20,588); Chapel Hill, NC
Jan 21, 2017; 12:00 pm, ESPN		at No. 15 Notre Dame	L 66–84	11–9 (3–4)	24 – Lydon	10 – Lydon	4 – Howard	Edmund P. Joyce Center (9,149); South Bend, IN
Jan 24, 2017; 8:00 pm, ACCN		Wake Forest	W 81–76	12–9 (4–4)	27 – White	9 – Lydon	6 – Gillon	Carrier Dome (22,262); Syracuse, NY
Jan 28, 2017; 12:00 pm, ESPN2		No. 6 Florida State	W 82–72	13–9 (5–4)	24 – White	11 – Lydon	11 – Gillon	Carrier Dome (24,978); Syracuse, NY
Feb 1, 2017; 7:00 pm, ESPN2		at NC State	W 100–93 ^{OT}	14–9 (6–4)	43 – Gillon	7 – Lydon	9 – Gillon	PNC Arena (16,346); Raleigh, NC
Feb 4, 2017; 12:00 pm, ESPN2		No. 9 Virginia	W 66–62	15–9 (7–4)	23 – White III	6 – Lydon	4 – Gillon	Carrier Dome (27,553); Syracuse, NY
Feb 7, 2017; 8:00 pm, ACCN		at Clemson	W 82–81	16–9 (8–4)	23 – White III	9 – Lydon	8 – Gillon	Littlejohn Coliseum (7,045); Clemson, SC
Feb 11, 2017; 7:00 pm, ACCN		at Pittsburgh	L 75–80	16–10 (8–5)	20 – Tied	6 – Lydon	4 – Gillon	Petersen Events Center (10,216); Pittsburgh, PA
Feb 13, 2017; 7:00 pm, ESPN		No. 8 Louisville	L 72–76 ^{OT}	16–11 (8–6)	22 – White III	9 – Lydon	5 – Gillon	Carrier Dome (25,303); Syracuse, NY
Feb 19, 2017; 6:30 pm, ESPNU		at Georgia Tech	L 65–71	16–12 (8–7)	18 – Thompson	15 – Lydon	6 – Gillon	Hank McCamish Pavilion (8,610); Atlanta, GA
Feb 22, 2017; 7:00 pm, ESPN		No. 10 Duke	W 78–75	17–12 (9–7)	26 – Gillon	9 – Lydon	6 – Gillon	Carrier Dome (30,331); Syracuse, NY
Feb 26, 2017; 2:00 pm, CBS		at No. 7 Louisville	L 68–88	17–13 (9–8)	20 – Battle	10 – Lydon	3 – Gillon	KFC Yum! Center (22,482); Louisville, KY
Mar 4, 2017; 4:00 pm, ACCN		Georgia Tech	W 90–61	18–13 (10–8)	40 – White III	13 – Lydon	10 – Gillon	Carrier Dome (30,448); Syracuse, NY
ACC Tournament
March 8, 2017; 12:00 pm, ESPN/ACCN	(8)	vs. (9) Miami (FL); Second Round	L 57–62	18–14	22 – White III	12 – Lydon	4 – Lydon	Barclays Center (17,732); Brooklyn, NY
NIT
March 15, 2017*; 7:00 pm, ESPN2	(1)	(8) UNC Greensboro; First Round – Syracuse Bracket	W 90–77	19–14	34 – White III	10 – Lydon	5 – Gillon	Carrier Dome (4,288); Syracuse, NY
March 18, 2017*; 11:00 am, ESPN	(1)	(5) Ole Miss; Second Round – Syracuse Bracket	L 80–85	19–15	18 – Thompson	14 – Lydon	8 – Gillon	Carrier Dome (9,556); Syracuse, NY
*Non-conference game. ^{#}Rankings from AP Poll. (#) Tournament seedings in parentheses. All times are in Eastern Time.

== Rankings ==
Ranking movements Legend: ██ Increase in ranking ██ Decrease in ranking — = Not ranked RV = Received votes
	Week																			
Poll	Pre	1	2	3	4	5	6	7	8	9	10	11	12	13	14	15	16	17	18	Final
AP	19	18	18	22	RV	RV	RV	—	—	—	—	—	—	—	—	—	—	—	—	Not released
Coaches	17	18	16	24	RV	RV	RV	—	—	—	—	—	—	—	—	—	—	—	—	

*AP does not release post-NCAA Tournament rankings
