= Maverick Rowan =

American basketball player (born 1996)

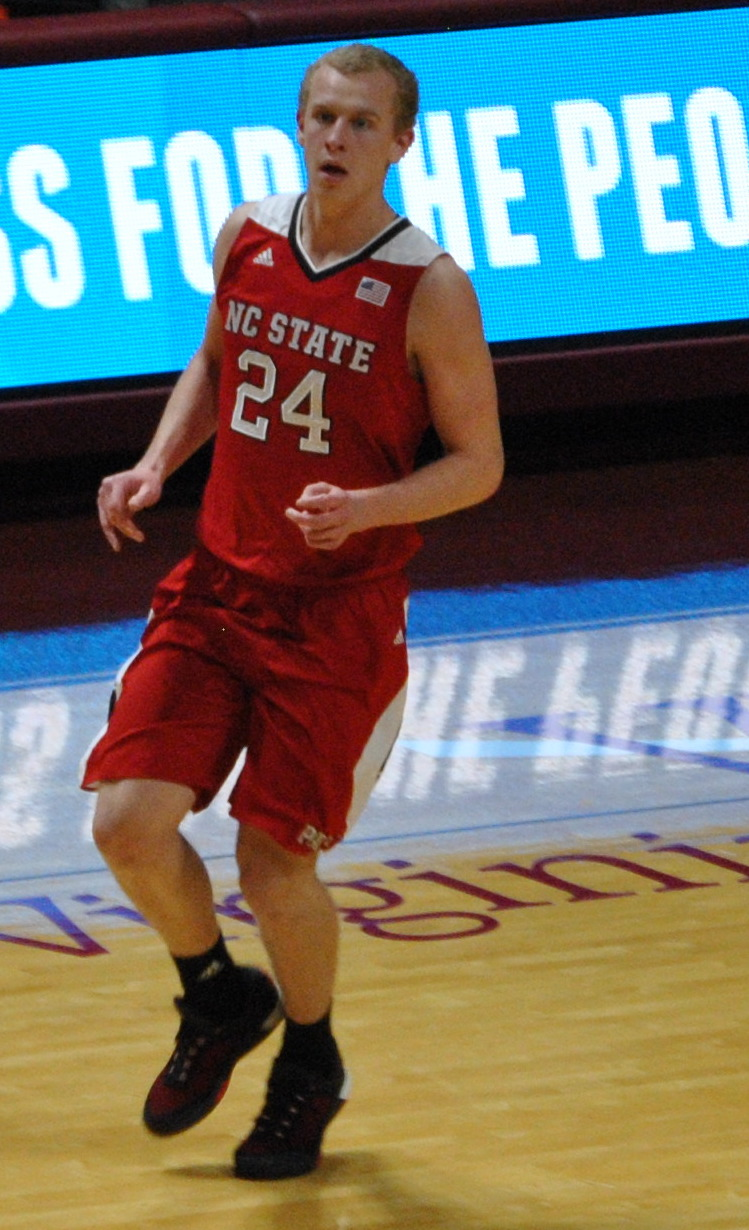

Free agent
- Position: Shooting guard / small forward

Personal information
- Born: July 14, 1996 (age 30) Fort Lauderdale, Florida, U.S.
- Listed height: 6 ft 7 in (2.01 m)
- Listed weight: 220 lb (100 kg)

Career information
- High school: Lincoln Park (Midland, Pennsylvania); Cardinal Gibbons (Fort Lauderdale, Florida)
- College: NC State (2015–2017)
- NBA draft: 2018: undrafted
- Playing career: 2017–present

Career history
- 2017: FMP
- 2017–2018: Lakeland Magic
- 2018: Westchester Knicks
- 2019: Austin Spurs
- 2019: Maine Red Claws
- 2019: St. John's Edge
- 2021–2022: CB Peñas Huesca
- 2022: UDEA Baloncesto
- 2022: Sioux Falls Skyforce
- 2024–2025: Pistoia Basket 2000

Maverick Rowan (born July 14, 1996) is an American professional basketball player who last played for Pistoia Basket 2000 of the Lega Basket Serie A (LBA). He played college basketball for the North Carolina State University and participated in the 2017 NBA draft, but ultimately withdrew his name from the draft after the college deadline.

== High school and college career ==
Rowan, the son of former NBA player Ron Rowan, played high school ball at Lincoln Park High School in Midland, Pennsylvania and at Cardinal Gibbons in Fort Lauderdale, Florida. He earned Pennsylvania 1A Player of the Year honors as a sophomore and Florida 5A Player of the Year distinction his junior year.

He joined the North Carolina State men's basketball team for the 2015–16 season, averaging 12.9 points per game, hitting 81 of his 241 shots taken from beyond the arc, which set a new NC State freshman record. He also corralled 3.1 rebounds per contest.

As a sophomore, Rowan sank 53 threes in 25 games, pouring in 12.0 points and 3.7 boards per outing. After the conclusion of the 2016-17 campaign, he opted to forgo the remaining two years of his college eligibility to launch his professional career and to enter the 2017 NBA draft. He was originally one of three NC State players to do so, with the others being Ted Kapita and Dennis Smith Jr. However, Rowan was one of two college players during the international players' draft deadline to withdraw his name from the 2017 draft while also not returning to college.

== Professional career ==
=== FMP (2017) ===
On August 3, 2017, Rowan signed a three-year deal with Serbian club FMP Belgrade. On October 12, 2017, he was released by FMP after appearing in three ABA League games. He averaged 2 points and 0.7 rebounds per game.

=== Lakeland Magic (2017–2018) ===
Rowan later joined the Lakeland Magic of the NBA G League.

=== Westchester Knicks (2018) ===
On November 23, 2018, the Westchester Knicks of the NBA G League announced that they had acquired Rowan. On December 4, after appearing in three games, he was waived by the team.

=== Austin Spurs (2019) ===
On January 7, 2019, the Austin Spurs of the NBA G League announced that they had acquired Rowan. He also recently played for the San Antonio Spurs for the 2018 NBA Summer League.

=== Maine Red Claws (2019) ===
On March 12, 2019, the Maine Red Claws of the NBA G League announced that they had acquired Rowan.

=== CB Peñas Huesca (2021–2022) ===
On October 5, 2021, Rowan signed with CB Peñas Huesca of the LEB Oro. He averaged 9.4 points and 2.7 rebounds per game.

=== UDEA Baloncesto (2022) ===
On February 20, 2022, Rowan signed with UDEA Baloncesto of the LEB Plata.

=== Sioux Falls Skyforce (2022) ===
On October 10, 2022, Rowan signed with the Sioux Falls Skyforce. He was waived on November 16 after appearing in 2 games.

=== Pistoia Basket 2000 (2024–2025) ===
On July 6, 2024, he signed with Pistoia Basket 2000 of the Lega Basket Serie A (LBA). On March 12, 2025, Rowan left the team.
