= 2016–17 Boston College Eagles men's basketball team =

American college basketball season

2016–17 Boston College Eagles men's basketball
- Conference: Atlantic Coast Conference
- Record: 9–23 (2–16 ACC)
- Head coach: Jim Christian (3rd season)
- Assistant coaches: Scott Spinelli; Bill Wuczynski; Stan Heath
- Home arena: Conte Forum

2016–17 ACC men's basketball standings
	Conf.				Overall
Team	W		L	PCT	W		L	PCT
No. 5 North Carolina	14	–	4	.778	33	–	7	.825
No. 16 Florida State	12	–	6	.667	26	–	9	.743
No. 14 Notre Dame	12	–	6	.667	26	–	10	.722
No. 10 Louisville	12	–	6	.667	25	–	9	.735
No. 7 Duke †	11	–	7	.611	28	–	9	.757
No. 24 Virginia	11	–	7	.611	23	–	11	.676
Virginia Tech	10	–	8	.556	22	–	11	.667
Miami (FL)	10	–	8	.556	21	–	12	.636
Syracuse	10	–	8	.556	19	–	15	.559
Wake Forest	9	–	9	.500	19	–	14	.576
Georgia Tech	8	–	10	.444	21	–	16	.568
Clemson	6	–	12	.333	17	–	16	.515
NC State	0	–	14	.000	0	–	17	.000[3]
Pittsburgh	4	–	14	.222	16	–	17	.485
Boston College	2	–	16	.111	9	–	23	.281
† 2017 ACC tournament winner Rankings from AP poll

The 2016–17 Boston College Eagles men's basketball team represented Boston College during the 2016–17 NCAA Division I men's basketball season. The Eagles, led by third-year head coach Jim Christian, played their home games at the Conte Forum as members of the Atlantic Coast Conference. They finished the season 9–23, 2–16 in ACC play to finish in last place. As the No. 15 seed in the ACC tournament, they lost in the first round to Wake Forest.

== Previous season ==
The Eagles finished the 2015–16 season with a record of 7–25, 0–18 to finish in last place in ACC play. This was the first time a team went winless in the ACC during a season. They lost to Florida State in the first round of the ACC tournament.

== Departures ==
Name	Number	Pos.	Height	Weight	Year	Hometown	Notes
Darryl Hicks	2	G	6'2"	192	RS Sophomore	Louisville, KY	Transferred to Campbellsville
Eli Carter	3	G	6'2"	200	RS Senior	Paterson, NJ	Graduated
Idy Diallo	4	F	6'11"	253	RS Freshman	Los Angeles, CA	Transferred to UC Riverside
Steve Perpiglia	20	G	5'10"	165	Senior	Broomall, PA	Walk-on; graduated
Matt Milon	22	G	6'4"	200	Freshman	Ovideo, FL	Transferred to William & Mary
Dennis Clifford	24	C	7'1"	262	Senior	Bridgewater, MA	Graduated
Sammy Barnes-Thompkins	55	G	6'3"	192	Freshman	Phoenix, AZ	Transferred to Odessa College

=== Incoming transfers ===
Name	Number	Pos.	Height	Weight	Year	Hometown	Previous School
Connar Tava	3	F	6'6"	245	RS Senior	Macomb, MI	Transferred from Western Michigan. Will be eligible to play immediately since Tava graduated from Western Michigan.
Maurice Jeffers	15	F	6'9"	240	RS Senior	Washington, D.C.	Transferred from Delaware. Will be eligible to play immediately since Jeffers graduated from Delaware.
Jordan Chatman	25	G	6'5"	195	RS Sophomore	Vancouver, WA	Transferred from BYU. Will be eligible to play.

== Recruiting ==
College recruiting information
Name	Hometown	School	Height	Weight	Commit date
Ty Graves #57 SG	Greensboro, NC	Page High School	5 ft 11 in (1.80 m)	165 lb (75 kg)	Dec 17, 2014
Ty Graves #57 SG	Recruit ratings: Scout: Rivals: 247Sports: ESPN:				
Mike Sagay #64 SF	Bloomfield, CT	St. Thomas More School	6 ft 6 in (1.98 m)	205 lb (93 kg)	Oct 10, 2015
Mike Sagay #64 SF	Recruit ratings: Scout: Rivals: 247Sports: ESPN:				
Nik Popovic; PF	Weston, FL	The Sagemont School	6 ft 10 in (2.08 m)	230 lb (100 kg)	Oct 10, 2015
Nik Popovic; PF	Recruit ratings: Scout: Rivals: 247Sports: ESPN:				
Ky Bowman; SG	Havelock, NC	Havelock High School	6 ft 2 in (1.88 m)	175 lb (79 kg)	Mar 30, 2016
Ky Bowman; SG	Recruit ratings: Scout: Rivals: 247Sports: ESPN:				
Overall recruit ranking:
Note: In many cases, Scout, Rivals, 247Sports, On3, and ESPN may conflict in their listings of height and weight.; In these cases, the average was taken. ESPN grades are on a 100-point scale.; Sources: "2016 Team Ranking". Rivals.

== Roster ==
2016–17 Boston College Eagles men's basketball team
Players
Coaches

Pos.	#	Name	Height	Weight	Year	Previous school	Hometown
G	0	Ky Bowman	6 ft 1 in (1.85 m)	182 lb (83 kg)	Fr	Havelock High School	Havelock, North Carolina
G	1	Jerome Robinson	6 ft 5 in (1.96 m)	190 lb (86 kg)	So	Needham B. Broughton High School	Raleigh, North Carolina
F	2	Connar Tava	6 ft 6 in (1.98 m)	250 lb (113 kg)	GS	Western Michigan	Macomb, Michigan
G	3	Ty Graves	6 ft 0 in (1.83 m)	165 lb (75 kg)	Fr	High Point Christian Academy	Greensboro, North Carolina
F	5	Garland Owens	6 ft 5 in (1.96 m)	222 lb (101 kg)	Sr	Colonel Zadok A. Magruder High School	Gaithersburg, Maryland
F	10	Ervins Meznieks	6 ft 7 in (2.01 m)	230 lb (104 kg)	So	Riga Teika Secondary School	Riga, Latvia
F	11	A.J. Turner	6 ft 7 in (2.01 m)	188 lb (85 kg)	So	New Hampton School	Mount Clemens, Michigan
F/C	12	Johncarlos Reyes	6 ft 10 in (2.08 m)	214 lb (97 kg)	RS Fr	Sound Doctrine Christian Academy	Lawrenceville, Georgia
F	14	Aser Ghebremichael (W)	6 ft 8 in (2.03 m)	195 lb (88 kg)	So	Brooks School	Somerville, Massachusetts
F	15	Mo Jeffers	6 ft 9 in (2.06 m)	240 lb (109 kg)	GS	Delaware	Washington, D.C.
G/F	20	Gordon Gehan (W)	6 ft 5 in (1.96 m)	220 lb (100 kg)	So	Episcopal School of Dallas	Dallas, Texas
F	21	Nik Popovic	6 ft 11 in (2.11 m)	243 lb (110 kg)	Fr	Sagemont School	Banja Luka, Bosnia and Herzegovina
G	22	Matt DiLuccio (W)	5 ft 11 in (1.8 m)	180 lb (82 kg)	Fr	South Side High School	Rockville Centre, New York
F	23	Mike Sagay	6 ft 7 in (2.01 m)	200 lb (91 kg)	Fr	St. Thomas More School (CT)	Bloomfield, Connecticut
G	25	Jordan Chatman	6 ft 5 in (1.96 m)	198 lb (90 kg)	RS So	BYU	Vancouver, Washington

Head coach

- Jim Christian (Rhode Island)

Assistant coach(es)

- Scott Spinelli (Boston University)
- Bill Wuczynski (UNLV)
- Stan Heath (Eastern Michigan)

Legend

- (C) Team captain
- (S) Suspended
- (I) Ineligible
- (W) Walk-on
- Injured
- Current redshirt

Roster

== Schedule and results ==
Date time, TV	Rank^{#}	Opponent^{#}	Result	Record	Site (attendance) city, state
Exhibition
11/03/2016*; 7:00 pm		Stonehill	W 81–74		Conte Forum; Chestnut Hill, MA
Non-conference regular season
11/11/2016*; 7:00 pm, ACCN Extra		Nicholls State	L 73–79	0–1	Conte Forum (3,122); Chestnut Hill, MA
11/15/2016*; 7:00 pm, ACCN Extra		Maryland Eastern Shore	W 73–57	1–1	Conte Forum (2,051); Chestnut Hill, MA
11/20/2016*; 1:00 pm, ACCN Extra		Stony Brook; Barclays Center Classic Opening Round	W 82–75	2–1	Conte Forum (2,108); Chestnut Hill, MA
11/22/2016*; 7:00 pm, ACCN Extra		Towson; Barclays Center Classic	W 80–70	3–1	Conte Forum (2,163); Chestnut Hill, MA
11/25/2016*; 7:00 pm, ASN		vs. Kansas State; Barclays Center Classic semifinals	L 54–72	3–2	Barclays Center; Brooklyn, NY
11/26/2016*; 7:00 pm, ASN		vs. Richmond; Barclays Center Classic Consolation Game	L 54–67	3–3	Barclays Center; Brooklyn, NY
12/03/2016*; 1:00 pm, ACCN Extra		Dartmouth	W 88–70	4–3	Conte Forum (3,188); Chestnut Hill, MA
12/07/2016*; 7:00 pm, ACCN Extra		Harvard; Rivalry	L 66–74	4–4	Conte Forum (3,832); Chestnut Hill, MA
12/09/2016*; 7:00 pm, ACCN Extra		Hartford	L 63–65	4–5	Conte Forum (2,274); Chestnut Hill, MA
12/12/2016*; 7:00 pm, FS1		vs. Auburn; Under Armour Reunion	W 72–71	5–5	Madison Square Garden; New York City, NY
12/18/2016*; 1:00 pm, ACCN Extra		Sacred Heart	W 82–75	6–5	Conte Forum; Chestnut Hill, MA
12/21/2016*; 6:00 pm, CBSSN		vs. Fairfield; Hall of Fame's Birthday of Basketball	L 83–89	6–6	Mohegan Sun Arena; Uncasville, CT
12/23/2016*; 4:00 pm, ESPNU		Providence	W 79–67	7–6	Conte Forum (5,266); Chestnut Hill, MA
ACC regular season
01/01/2017; 12:30 pm, ESPNU		Syracuse	W 96–81	8–6 (1–0)	Conte Forum (7,226); Chestnut Hill, MA
01/03/2017; 7:30 pm, RSN/NESN		at Wake Forest	L 66–79	8–7 (1–1)	LJVM Coliseum (7,708); Winston-Salem, NC
01/07/2017; 2:00 pm, RSN/NESN		at No. 8 Duke	L 82–93	8–8 (1–2)	Cameron Indoor Stadium (9,914); Durham, NC
01/11/2017; 9:00 pm, RSN/NESN		NC State	W 74–66	9–8 (2–2)	Conte Forum (3,904); Chestnut Hill, MA
01/14/2017; 4:00 pm, RSN/NESN		at Syracuse	L 53–76	9–9 (2–3)	Carrier Dome (21,626); Syracuse, NY
01/18/2017; 8:00 pm, ACCN		No. 16 Virginia	L 54–71	9–10 (2–4)	Conte Forum (5,038); Chestnut Hill, MA
01/21/2017; 12:00 pm, ACCN		No. 9 North Carolina	L 82–90	9–11 (2–5)	Conte Forum (8,606); Chestnut Hill, MA
01/25/2017; 9:00 pm, RSN/NESN		at Miami (FL)	L 77–78	9–12 (2–6)	BankUnited Center (7,139); Coral Gables, FL
01/29/2017; 6:30 pm, ESPNU		at Virginia Tech	L 79–85	9–13 (2–7)	Cassell Coliseum (7,372); Blacksburg, VA
01/31/2017; 7:30 pm, ESPNU		Wake Forest	L 80–85	9–14 (2–8)	Conte Forum (3,751); Chestnut Hill, MA
02/04/2017; 4:30 pm, ACCN		No. 6 Louisville	L 67–90	9–15 (2–9)	Conte Forum (7,047); Chestnut Hill, MA
02/08/2017; 7:00 pm, RSN/NESN		Pittsburgh	L 72–83	9–16 (2–10)	Conte Forum (3,843); Chestnut Hill, MA
02/11/2017; 5:30 pm, RSN/NESN		at Georgia Tech	L 54–65	9–17 (2–11)	Hank McCamish Pavilion (7,391); Atlanta, GA
02/14/2017; 7:00 pm, ESPNU		No. 25 Notre Dame	L 76–84	9–18 (2–12)	Conte Forum (4,321); Chestnut Hill, MA
02/20/2017; 7:00 pm, ESPNU		at No. 19 Florida State	L 72–104	9–19 (2–13)	Donald L. Tucker Civic Center (9,609); Tallahassee, FL
02/25/2017; 4:00 pm, RSN/NESN		Virginia Tech	L 75–91	9–20 (2–14)	Conte Forum (6,311); Chestnut Hill, MA
03/01/2017; 8:00 pm, ACCN		at No. 19 Notre Dame	L 66–82	9–21 (2–15)	Edmund P. Joyce Center (9,028); South Bend, IN
03/04/2017; 4:00 pm, ACCN		at Clemson	L 68–82	9–22 (2–16)	Littlejohn Coliseum (8,135); Clemson, SC
ACC tournament
March 7, 2017; 2:00 pm, ESPN2	(15)	vs. (10) Wake Forest; First round	L 78–92	9–23	Barclays Center (8,656); Brooklyn, NY
*Non-conference game. ^{#}Rankings from AP Poll. (#) Tournament seedings in parentheses. All times are in Eastern Time.

== See also ==
- 2016–17 Boston College Eagles women's basketball team
