= 2017 ACC men's basketball tournament =

- 2017 ACC Tournament logo
- Classification: Division I
- Season: 2016–17
- Teams: 15
- Site: Barclays Center; Brooklyn, New York
- Champions: Duke (20th title)
- Winning coach: Mike Krzyzewski (14th title)
- MVP: Luke Kennard (Duke)
- Television: ESPN and ACC Network

2016–17 ACC men's basketball standings
	Conf.				Overall
Team	W		L	PCT	W		L	PCT
No. 5 North Carolina	14	–	4	.778	33	–	7	.825
No. 16 Florida State	12	–	6	.667	26	–	9	.743
No. 14 Notre Dame	12	–	6	.667	26	–	10	.722
No. 10 Louisville	12	–	6	.667	25	–	9	.735
No. 7 Duke †	11	–	7	.611	28	–	9	.757
No. 24 Virginia	11	–	7	.611	23	–	11	.676
Virginia Tech	10	–	8	.556	22	–	11	.667
Miami (FL)	10	–	8	.556	21	–	12	.636
Syracuse	10	–	8	.556	19	–	15	.559
Wake Forest	9	–	9	.500	19	–	14	.576
Georgia Tech	8	–	10	.444	21	–	16	.568
Clemson	6	–	12	.333	17	–	16	.515
NC State	0	–	14	.000	0	–	17	.000[3]
Pittsburgh	4	–	14	.222	16	–	17	.485
Boston College	2	–	16	.111	9	–	23	.281
† 2017 ACC tournament winner Rankings from AP poll

The 2017 Atlantic Coast Conference men's basketball tournament was the postseason men's basketball tournament for the Atlantic Coast Conference and was held at Barclays Center in Brooklyn, New York from March 7 to 11, 2017. Duke became the first team in history to win four straight games in the ACC Tournament and received the conference's automatic bid to the 2017 NCAA tournament with a 75–69 win over Notre Dame.

== Seeds ==
All 15 ACC teams participated in the tournament. The top nine teams receive first-round byes and the top four teams received double-byes to the quarterfinals. Teams were seeded by record within the conference, with a tiebreaker system to seed teams with identical conference records.

Seed	School	Conference	Tiebreaker
1	North Carolina	14–4	
2	Florida State	12–6	2–1 vs. Notre Dame/Louisville
3	Notre Dame	12–6	2–2 vs. Florida State/Louisville
4	Louisville	12–6	1–2 vs. Florida State/Notre Dame
5	Duke	11–7	1–0 vs. Virginia
6	Virginia	11–7	0–1 vs. Duke
7	Virginia Tech	10–8	2–1 vs. Syracuse/Miami
8	Syracuse	10–8	1–1 vs. Virginia Tech/Miami
9	Miami	10–8	1–2 vs. Virginia Tech/Syracuse
10	Wake Forest	9–9	
11	Georgia Tech	8–10	
12	Clemson	6–12	
13	NC State	4–14	1–0 vs Pittsburgh
14	Pittsburgh	4–14	0–1 vs NC State
15	Boston College	2–16	

== Schedule ==
All games on ACC Network

Session	Game	Time*	Matchup	Television	Attendance
First round – Tuesday, March 7
Opening day	1	noon	No.12 Clemson 75 vs No.13 NC State 61	ESPN2	8,656
Opening day	2	2 pm	No.10 Wake Forest 92 vs No.15 Boston College 78	ESPN2	8,656
Opening day	3	7 pm	No.11 Georgia Tech 59 vs No.14 Pittsburgh 61	ESPNU	8,656
Second round – Wednesday, March 8
1	4	noon	No.8 Syracuse 57 vs No.9 Miami 62	ESPN	17,732
1	5	2 pm	No.5 Duke 79 vs No.12 Clemson 72	ESPN	17,732
2	6	7 pm	No.7 Virginia Tech 99 vs No.10 Wake Forest 90	ESPN2	17,732
2	7	9 pm	No.6 Virginia 75 vs No.14 Pittsburgh 63	ESPN2	17,732
Quarterfinals – Thursday, March 9
3	8	noon	No.1 North Carolina 78 vs No.9 Miami 53	ESPN	17,732
3	9	2 pm	No.4 Louisville 77 vs No.5 Duke 81	ESPN	17,732
4	10	7 pm	No.2 Florida State 74 vs No.7 Virginia Tech 68	ESPN	17,732
4	11	9 pm	No.3 Notre Dame 71 vs No.6 Virginia 58	ESPN	17,732
Semifinals – Friday, March 10
5	12	7 pm	No.1 North Carolina 83 vs No.5 Duke 93	ESPN	18,109
5	13	9 pm	No.2 Florida State 73 vs No.3 Notre Dame 77	ESPN	18,109
Championship – Saturday, March 11
6	14	9 pm	No.5 Duke 75 vs No.3 Notre Dame 69	ESPN	18,109
*Game times in ET. Rankings denote tournament seed

== Bracket ==
First round Tuesday, March 7 ESPN2/ESPNU/ACCN
12	Clemson	75
13	NC State	61
10	Wake Forest	92
15	Boston College	78
11	Georgia Tech	59
14	Pittsburgh	61

Second round Wednesday, March 8 ESPN/ESPN2/ACCN
8	Syracuse	57
9	Miami	62
5	Duke	79
12	Clemson	72
7	Virginia Tech	99
10	Wake Forest	90
6	Virginia	75
14	Pittsburgh	63

Quarterfinals; Thursday, March 9 ESPN/ACCN
1	North Carolina	78
9	Miami	53
4	Louisville	77
5	Duke	81
2	Florida State	74
7	Virginia Tech	68
3	Notre Dame	71
6	Virginia	58

Semifinals; Friday, March 10; ESPN/ACCN
1	North Carolina	83
5	Duke	93
2	Florida State	73
3	Notre Dame	77

Championship; Saturday, March 11; ESPN/ACCN
5	Duke	75
3	Notre Dame	69

== Awards and honors ==
Tournament MVP: Luke Kennard, Duke

All-Tournament Teams:

First Team
- Luke Kennard, Duke
- Jayson Tatum, Duke
- Bonzie Colson, Notre Dame
- Matt Farrell, Notre Dame
- Isaiah Hicks, North Carolina

Second Team
- Grayson Allen, Duke
- Frank Jackson, Duke
- Amile Jefferson, Duke
- Steve Vasturia, Notre Dame
- Zach LeDay, Virginia Tech

== See also ==
- 2017 ACC women's basketball tournament
