= 2016–17 Duke Blue Devils men's basketball team =

American college basketball season

2016–17 Duke Blue Devils men's basketball

ACC tournament champion Hall of Fame Tip Off champion

NCAA tournament, Second Round
- Conference: Atlantic Coast Conference

Ranking
- Coaches: No. 13
- AP: No. 7
- Record: 28–9 (11–7 ACC)
- Head coach: Mike Krzyzewski (37th season)
- Assistant coaches: Jeff Capel; Nate James; Jon Scheyer; Nolan Smith
- Captains: Matt Jones; Amile Jefferson; Grayson Allen (stripped) (Note: After tripping an Elon player, Allen was stripped of his captaincy.)
- Home arena: Cameron Indoor Stadium

2016–17 ACC men's basketball standings
	Conf.				Overall
Team	W		L	PCT	W		L	PCT
No. 5 North Carolina	14	–	4	.778	33	–	7	.825
No. 16 Florida State	12	–	6	.667	26	–	9	.743
No. 14 Notre Dame	12	–	6	.667	26	–	10	.722
No. 10 Louisville	12	–	6	.667	25	–	9	.735
No. 7 Duke †	11	–	7	.611	28	–	9	.757
No. 24 Virginia	11	–	7	.611	23	–	11	.676
Virginia Tech	10	–	8	.556	22	–	11	.667
Miami (FL)	10	–	8	.556	21	–	12	.636
Syracuse	10	–	8	.556	19	–	15	.559
Wake Forest	9	–	9	.500	19	–	14	.576
Georgia Tech	8	–	10	.444	21	–	16	.568
Clemson	6	–	12	.333	17	–	16	.515
NC State	0	–	14	.000	0	–	17	.000[3]
Pittsburgh	4	–	14	.222	16	–	17	.485
Boston College	2	–	16	.111	9	–	23	.281
† 2017 ACC tournament winner Rankings from AP poll

The 2016–17 Duke Blue Devils men's basketball team represented Duke University during the 2016–17 NCAA Division I men's basketball season. They were coached by 37th-year head coach Mike Krzyzewski. Starting on January 7, Jeff Capel temporarily took over coaching duties while Krzyzewski recovered from lower back surgery. The Blue Devils played their home games at Cameron Indoor Stadium in Durham, North Carolina as a member of the Atlantic Coast Conference. They finished the season 28–9, 11–7 in ACC play to finish in fifth place. They became the first ACC team to win four games in four days on their way to winning the ACC tournament. They received the ACC's automatic bid to the NCAA tournament, where they defeated Troy in the first round to advance to the second round, where they lost to South Carolina.

== Previous season ==
Duke advanced to the Sweet Sixteen a year after winning its fifth national championship. The Blue Devils beat UNC-Wilmington and Yale before falling to top seeded Oregon in the West region.

== Off-season ==
=== Departures ===
Name	Number	Pos.	Height	Weight	Year	Hometown	Reason for departure
Marshall Plumlee	40	C	7'0"	250	Senior	Warsaw, Indiana	Graduated
Brandon Ingram	14	G/F	6'9"	190	Freshman	Kinston, North Carolina	Declared for 2016 NBA draft
Derryck Thornton	12	PG	6'2"	175	Freshman	Chatsworth, California	Transfer to USC

=== 2016 recruiting class ===
Recruits at the 2016 McDonald's All-American Game

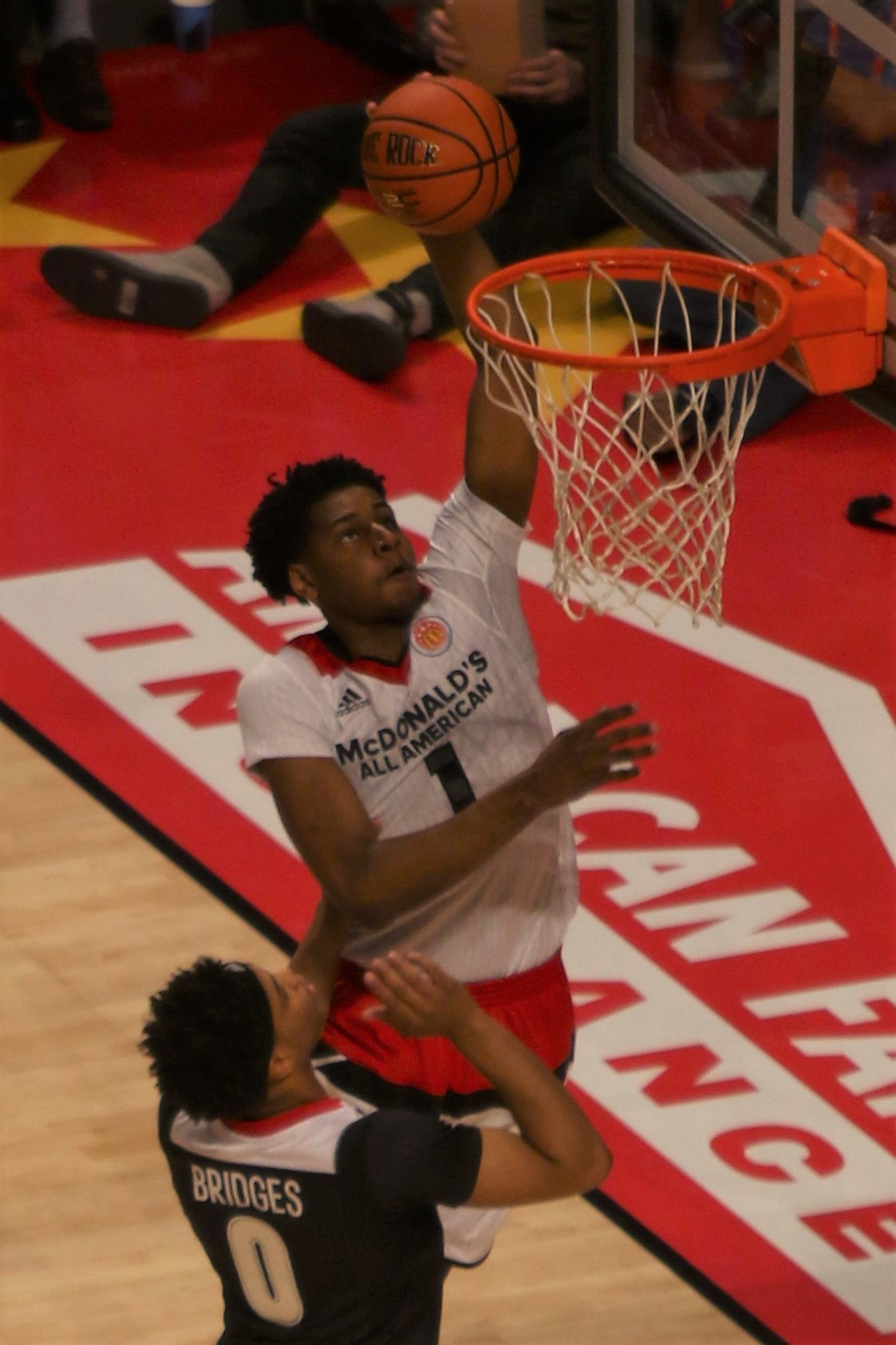
Marques Bolden, Duke

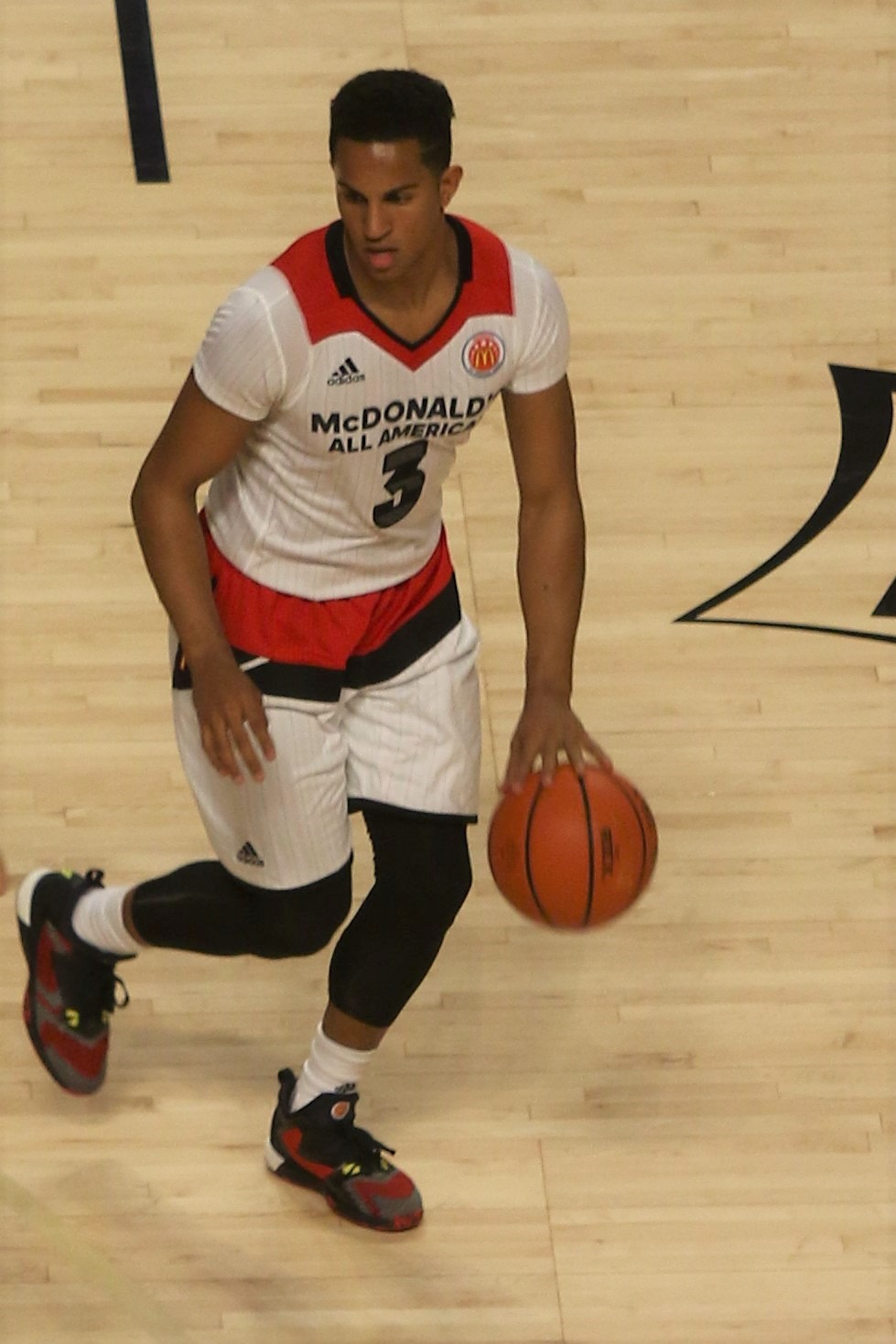
Frank Jackson, Duke

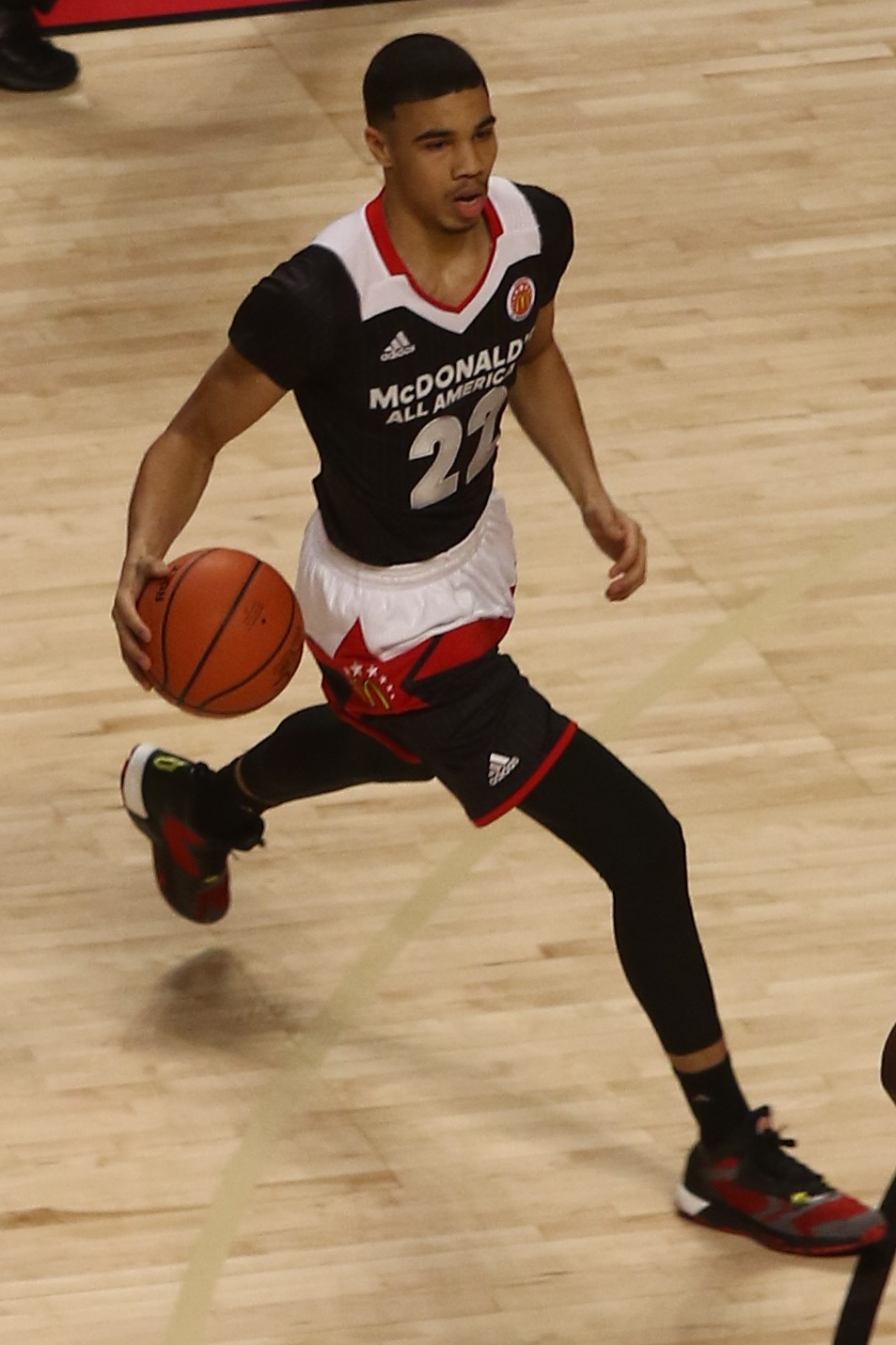
Jayson Tatum, Duke

College recruiting
Name	Hometown	School	Height	Weight	Commit date
Jayson Tatum; SF	St. Louis, MO	Chaminade College Prep	6 ft 8 in (2.03 m)	205 lb (93 kg)	7/12/2015
Jayson Tatum; SF	Recruit ratings: Scout: Rivals: 247Sports: ESPN: (97)				
Frank Jackson; CG	Highland, UT	Lone Peak HS	6 ft 3 in (1.91 m)	185 lb (84 kg)	9/1/2015
Frank Jackson; CG	Recruit ratings: Scout: Rivals: 247Sports: ESPN: (96)				
Javin DeLaurier; PF	Charlottesville, VA	St. Anne's-Belfield School	6 ft 8 in (2.03 m)	215 lb (98 kg)	9/27/2015
Javin DeLaurier; PF	Recruit ratings: Scout: Rivals: 247Sports: ESPN: (87)				
Harry Giles III; PF	Winston-Salem, NC	Oak Hill Academy	6 ft 10 in (2.08 m)	220 lb (100 kg)	11/6/2015
Harry Giles III; PF	Recruit ratings: Scout: Rivals: 247Sports: ESPN: (97)				
Jack White; SF	Canberra, AU	Australian Institute of Sport	6 ft 7 in (2.01 m)	220 lb (100 kg)	3/3/2016
Jack White; SF	Recruit ratings: Scout: Rivals: 247Sports: ESPN:				
Marques Bolden; C	DeSoto, TX	DeSoto HS	6 ft 11 in (2.11 m)	240 lb (110 kg)	5/19/2016
Marques Bolden; C	Recruit ratings: Scout: Rivals: 247Sports: ESPN: (93)				
Overall recruit ranking: Scout: #1 Rivals: #2 247Sports: #1 ESPN: #2
Note: In many cases, Scout, Rivals, 247Sports, On3, and ESPN may conflict in their listings of height and weight.; In these cases, the average was taken. ESPN grades are on a 100-point scale.; Sources:

== Future recruits ==
=== 2017–18 team recruits ===
Duke recruits at the 2017 McDonald's All-American Boys Game

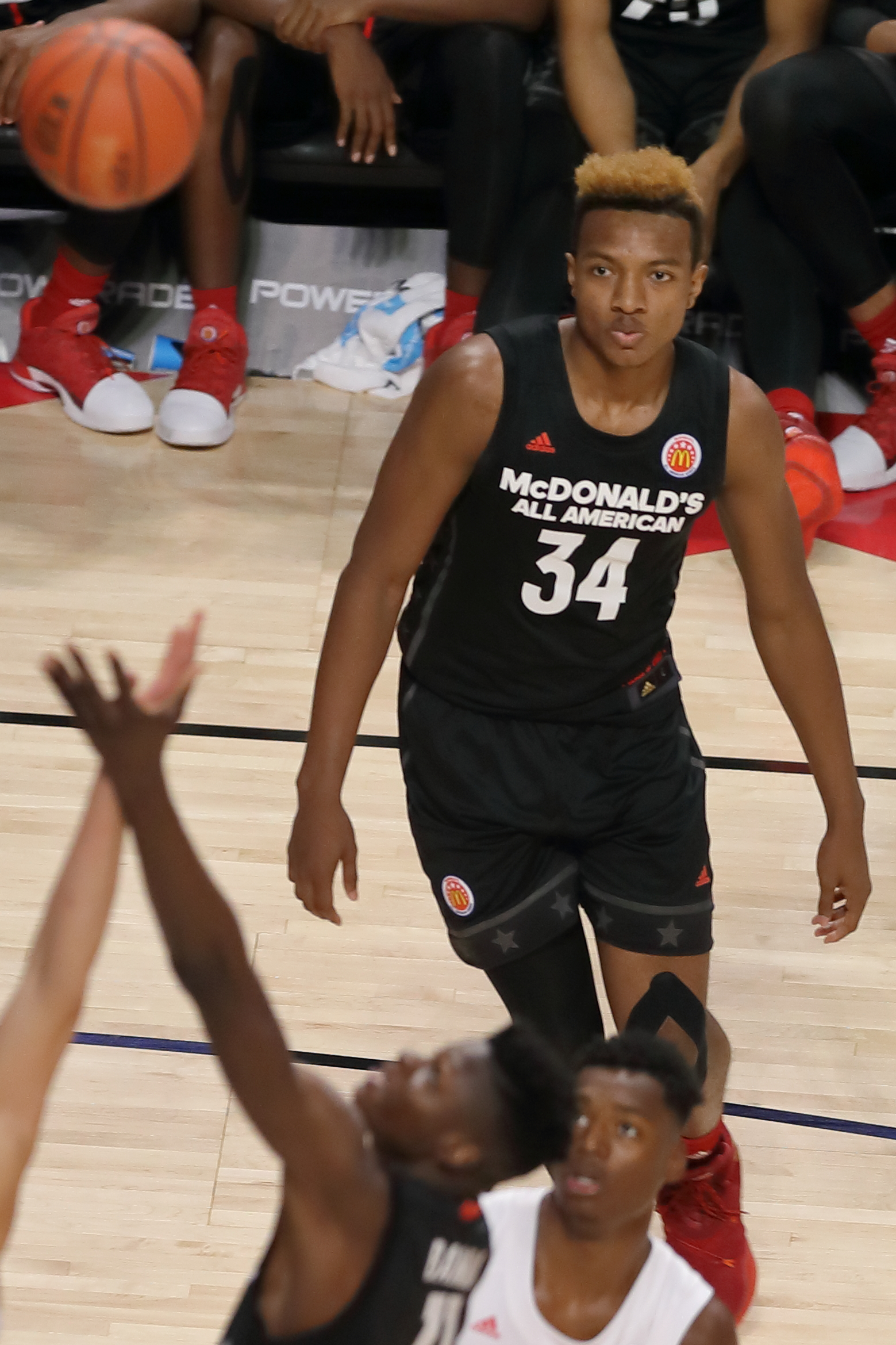
Wendell Carter Jr.

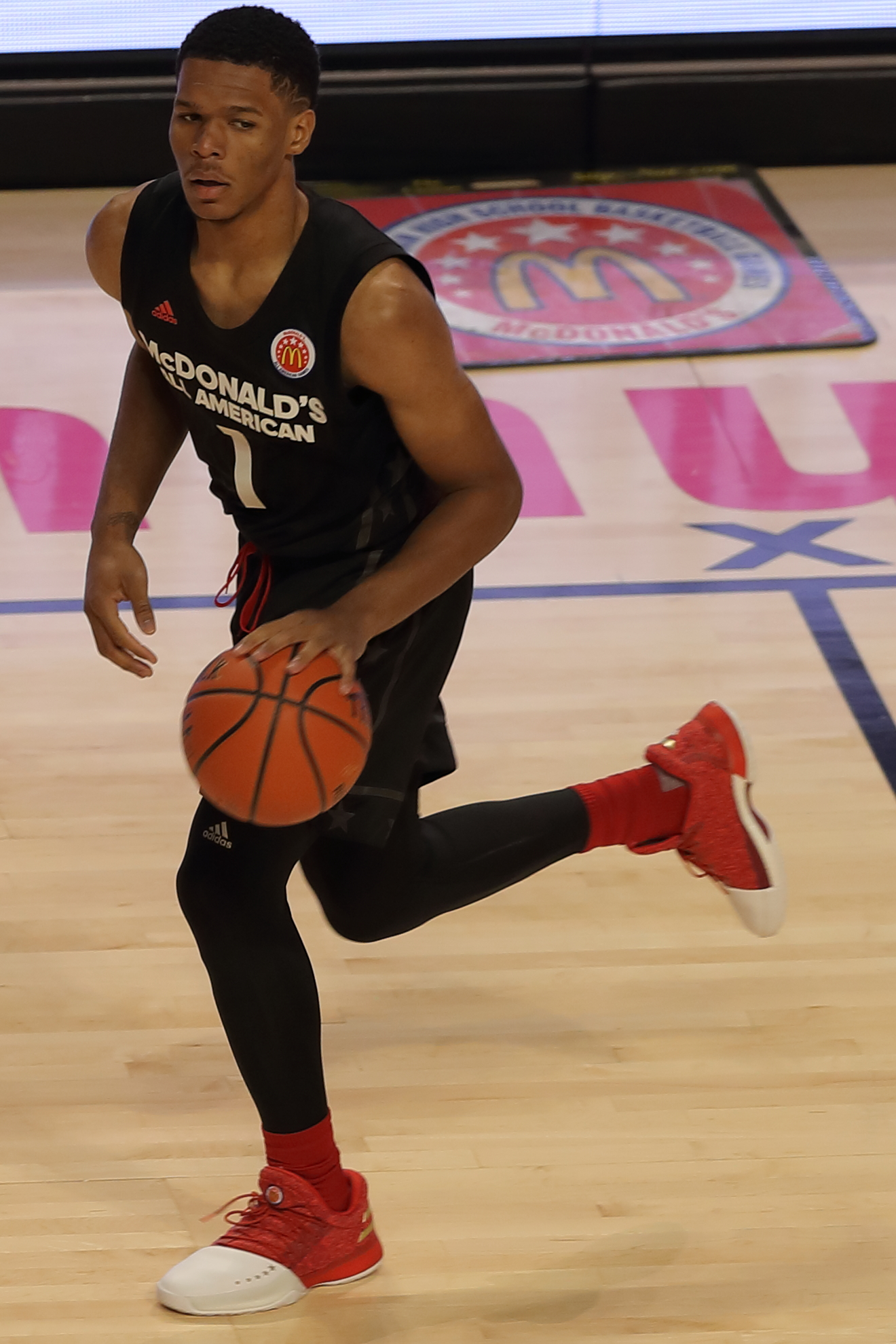
Trevon Duval

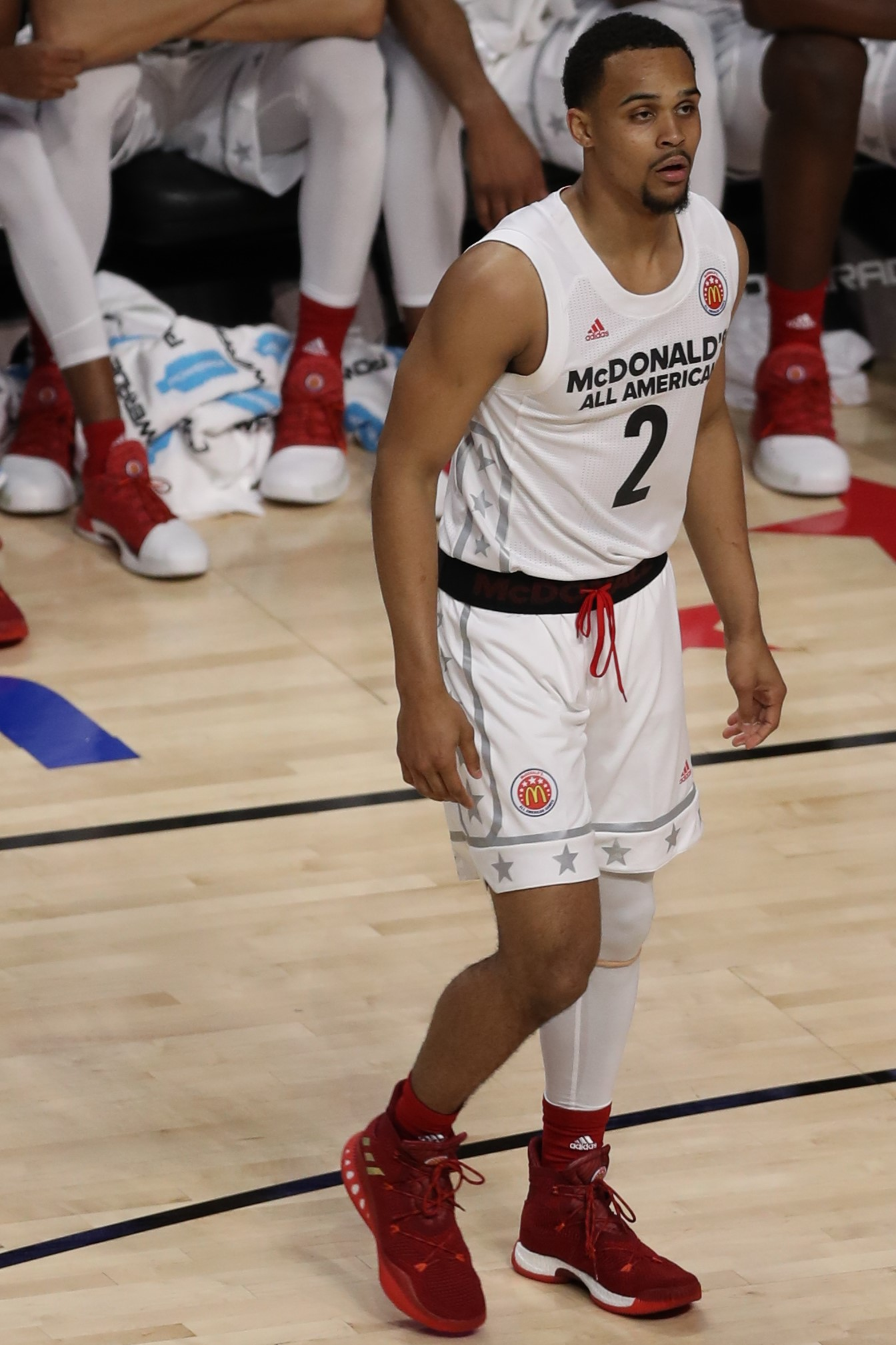
Gary Trent Jr.

College recruiting (2017)
Name	Hometown	School	Height	Weight	Commit date
Alex O'Connell; SG	Milton, GA	Milton High School	6 ft 6 in (1.98 m)	170 lb (77 kg)	08/26/16
Alex O'Connell; SG	Recruit ratings: Scout: Rivals: 247Sports: ESPN: (83)				
Gary Trent Jr. SG	Apple Valley, MN	Prolific Prep (CA)	6 ft 5 in (1.96 m)	205 lb (93 kg)	11/10/2016
Gary Trent Jr. SG	Recruit ratings: Scout: Rivals: 247Sports: ESPN: (95)				
Wendell Carter Jr. PF	Atlanta, GA	Pace Academy	6 ft 10 in (2.08 m)	250 lb (110 kg)	11/23/2016
Wendell Carter Jr. PF	Recruit ratings: Scout: Rivals: 247Sports: ESPN: (96)				
Jordan Goldwire; PG	Norcross, GA	Norcross High School	6 ft 1 in (1.85 m)	165 lb (75 kg)	May 1, 2017
Jordan Goldwire; PG	Recruit ratings: Scout: Rivals: 247Sports: ESPN: (78)				
Jordan Tucker; SF	White Plains, NY	Joseph Wheeler High School	6 ft 7 in (2.01 m)	205 lb (93 kg)	May 13, 2017
Jordan Tucker; SF	Recruit ratings: Scout: Rivals: 247Sports: ESPN: (88)				
Trevon Duval; PG	Wilmington, DE	IMG Academy (FL)	6 ft 3 in (1.91 m)	190 lb (86 kg)	May 15, 2017
Trevon Duval; PG	Recruit ratings: Scout: Rivals: 247Sports: ESPN: (96)				
Marvin Bagley III; PF	Tempe, AZ	Sierra Canyon School (CA)	6 ft 11 in (2.11 m)	220 lb (100 kg)	August 14, 2017
Marvin Bagley III; PF	Recruit ratings: Scout: Rivals: 247Sports: ESPN: (98)				
Overall recruit ranking: Scout: #2 Rivals: #2 247Sports: #2 ESPN: #2
Note: In many cases, Scout, Rivals, 247Sports, On3, and ESPN may conflict in their listings of height and weight.; In these cases, the average was taken. ESPN grades are on a 100-point scale.; Sources: "2017 Team Ranking". Rivals.

== Roster ==
2016–17 Duke Blue Devils men's basketball team
Players
Coaches

Pos.	#	Name	Height	Weight	Year	Previous school	Hometown
F	0	Jayson Tatum	6 ft 8 in (2.03 m)	205 lb (93 kg)	Fr	Chaminade College Prep	St. Louis, Missouri
F	1	Harry Giles	6 ft 10 in (2.08 m)	240 lb (109 kg)	Fr	Forest Trail Academy	Winston-Salem, North Carolina
F/C	2	Chase Jeter	6 ft 10 in (2.08 m)	230 lb (104 kg)	So	Bishop Gorman HS	Las Vegas, Nevada
G	3	Grayson Allen	6 ft 5 in (1.96 m)	202 lb (92 kg)	Jr	Providence School	Jacksonville, Florida
G	5	Luke Kennard	6 ft 6 in (1.98 m)	202 lb (92 kg)	So	Franklin HS	Franklin, Ohio
F	12	Javin DeLaurier	6 ft 10 in (2.08 m)	220 lb (100 kg)	Fr	St. Anne's-Belfield School	Charlottesville, Virginia
G	13	Matt Jones (C)	6 ft 5 in (1.96 m)	204 lb (93 kg)	Sr	DeSoto HS	DeSoto, Texas
G	15	Frank Jackson	6 ft 3 in (1.91 m)	205 lb (93 kg)	Fr	Lone Peak HS	Highland, Utah
C	20	Marques Bolden	6 ft 11 in (2.11 m)	245 lb (111 kg)	Fr	DeSoto HS	DeSoto, Texas
F	21	Amile Jefferson (C)	6 ft 9 in (2.06 m)	224 lb (102 kg)	RS Sr	Friends Central School	Philadelphia, Pennsylvania
C	30	Antonio Vrankovic	7 ft 0 in (2.13 m)	261 lb (118 kg)	So	Pine Crest School	Delray Beach, Florida
F	34	Sean Obi	6 ft 9 in (2.06 m)	255 lb (116 kg)	RS Jr	Green Farms/Rice	Kaduna, Nigeria
F	41	Jack White	6 ft 7 in (2.01 m)	215 lb (98 kg)	Fr	Australian Institute of Sport	Canberra, Australia
G	45	Nick Pagliuca (W)	6 ft 3 in (1.91 m)	195 lb (88 kg)	Sr	Milton Academy	Weston, Massachusetts
F	50	Justin Robinson	6 ft 8 in (2.03 m)	194 lb (88 kg)	RS Fr	San Antonio Christian	San Antonio, Texas
G	53	Brennan Besser (W)	6 ft 5 in (1.96 m)	188 lb (85 kg)	So	Latin School	Chicago, Illinois

Head coach

- Mike Krzyzewski

Assistant coach(es)

- Jeff Capel (Assoc. HC)
- Nate James
- Jon Scheyer

Legend

- (C) Team captain
- (S) Suspended
- (I) Ineligible
- (W) Walk-on
- Injured
- Current redshirt

Roster
Last update: July 18, 2016

- Roster is subject to change as/if players transfer or leave the program for other reasons.

=== Depth chart ===
Pos.	Starting 5	Bench 1	Bench 2	Bench 3
C	Amile Jefferson	Chase Jeter	Marques Bolden	Antonio Vrankovic
PF	Jayson Tatum	Harry Giles	Javin DeLaurier	Sean Obi
SF	Matt Jones		Jack White	Justin Robinson
SG	Luke Kennard	Frank Jackson
PG	Grayson Allen		Brennan Besser	Nick Pagliuca

== Schedule and results ==
Date time, TV	Rank^{#}	Opponent^{#}	Result	Record	High points	High rebounds	High assists	Site (attendance) city, state
Exhibition
Oct. 28, 2016*; 7:00 pm, ACCN Extra	No. 1	Virginia State	W 90–59		30 – Kennard	11 – Bolden	4 – Tied	Cameron Indoor Stadium (9,314); Durham, NC
Nov. 4, 2016*; 8:00 pm, ACCN Extra	No. 1	Augustana	W 98–45		17 – Kennard	14 – Jefferson	4 – Jackson	Cameron Indoor Stadium (9,314); Durham, NC
Non-conference regular season
Nov. 11, 2016*; 7:00 pm, ACCN Extra	No. 1	Marist; Hall of Fame Tip-Off	W 94–49	1–0	18 – Jackson	10 – Vrankovic	4 – Jackson	Cameron Indoor Stadium (9,314); Durham, NC
Nov. 12, 2016*; 7:00 pm, RSN	No. 1	Grand Canyon; Hall of Fame Tip-Off	W 96–61	2–0	25 – Allen	10 – Allen	6 – Kennard	Cameron Indoor Stadium (9,314); Durham, NC
Nov. 15, 2016*; 9:30 pm, ESPN	No. 1	vs. No. 7 Kansas; Champions Classic	L 75–77	2–1	22 – Kennard	10 – Kennard	5 – Kennard	Madison Square Garden (19,812); New York, NY
Nov. 19, 2016*; 12:30 pm, ESPN3	No. 1	vs. Penn State; Hall of Fame Tip-Off semifinals	W 78–68	3–1	17 – Jackson	15 – Jefferson	4 – Allen	Mohegan Sun Arena; Uncasville, CT
Nov. 20, 2016*; 1:00 pm, ESPN	No. 1	vs. No. 21 Rhode Island; Hall of Fame Tip-Off	W 75–65	4–1	24 – Kennard	15 – Jefferson	3 – Allen	Mohegan Sun Arena; Uncasville, CT
Nov. 23, 2016*; 7:00 pm, ESPNU	No. 6	William & Mary	W 88–67	5–1	17 – Jackson	10 – Jefferson	6 – Tied	Cameron Indoor Stadium (9,314); Durham, NC
Nov. 26, 2016*; 12:00 pm, RSN	No. 6	Appalachian State	W 93–58	6–1	21 – Allen	6 – Jefferson	5 – Jefferson	Cameron Indoor Stadium (9,314); Durham, NC
Nov. 29, 2016*; 9:30 pm, ESPN	No. 5	Michigan State; ACC–Big Ten Challenge	W 78–69	7–1	24 – Allen	13 – Jefferson	4 – Tied	Cameron Indoor Stadium (9,314); Durham, NC
Dec. 3, 2016*; 5:30 pm, ESPN2	No. 5	Maine	W 94–55	8–1	35 – Kennard	9 – Jefferson	4 – Jefferson	Cameron Indoor Stadium (9,314); Durham, NC
Dec. 6, 2016*; 9:00 pm, ESPN	No. 5	vs. No. 21 Florida; Jimmy V Classic	W 84–74	9–1	29 – Kennard	15 – Jefferson	8 – Allen	Madison Square Garden (15,294); New York, NY
Dec. 10, 2016*; 5:15 pm, ESPN	No. 5	vs. UNLV; T-Mobile Arena Showcase	W 94–45	10–1	34 – Allen	12 – Jefferson	4 – Jefferson	T-Mobile Arena (19,107); Paradise, NV
Dec. 19, 2016*; 7:00 pm, ESPN2	No. 5	Tennessee State	W 65–55	11–1	24 – Kennard	18 – Jefferson	3 – Tied	Cameron Indoor Stadium (9,314); Durham, NC
Dec. 21, 2016*; 6:00 pm, ESPN2	No. 5	vs. Elon	W 72–61	12–1	21 – Kennard	8 – Tatum	3 – Tatum	Greensboro Coliseum (9,733); Greensboro, NC
ACC regular season
Dec. 31, 2016; 12:00 pm, ESPN2	No. 5	at Virginia Tech	L 75–89	12–2 (0–1)	34 – Kennard	12 – Jefferson	3 – Jefferson	Cassell Coliseum (9,567); Blacksburg, VA
Jan. 4, 2017; 7:00 pm, ESPN2	No. 8	Georgia Tech	W 110–57	13–2 (1–1)	19 – Tatum	12 – Giles	7 – Allen	Cameron Indoor Stadium (9,314); Durham, NC
Jan. 7, 2017; 2:00 pm, RSN	No. 8	Boston College	W 93–82	14–2 (2–1)	22 – Tatum	6 – Tatum	11 – Allen	Cameron Indoor Stadium (9,314); Durham, NC
Jan. 10, 2017; 8:00 pm, ACCN	No. 7	at No. 9 Florida State	L 72–88	14–3 (2–2)	23 – Kennard	6 – Tied	5 – Allen	Donald L. Tucker Civic Center (11,675); Tallahassee, FL
Jan. 14, 2017; 12:00 pm, ESPN	No. 7	at No. 14 Louisville	L 69–78	14–4 (2–3)	23 – Allen	9 – Allen	3 – Tied	KFC Yum! Center (22,686); Louisville, KY
Jan. 21, 2017; 8:15 pm, ESPN	No. 18	Miami (FL); ESPN College GameDay	W 70–58	15–4 (3–3)	14 – Tatum	12 – Jefferson	4 – Jackson	Cameron Indoor Stadium (9,314); Durham, NC
Jan. 23, 2017; 7:00 pm, ESPN	No. 17	NC State	L 82–84	15–5 (3–4)	20 – Kennard	9 – Tatum	4 – Kennard	Cameron Indoor Stadium (9,314); Durham, NC
Jan. 28, 2017; 3:00 pm, ACCN	No. 17	at Wake Forest	W 85–83	16–5 (4–4)	34 – Kennard	6 – Allen	6 – Jones	LJVM Coliseum (14,681); Winston-Salem, NC
Jan. 30, 2017; 7:00 pm, ESPN	No. 21	at No. 20 Notre Dame	W 84–74	17–5 (5–4)	21 – Allen	14 – Tatum	3 – Tied	Edmund P. Joyce Center (9,149); South Bend, IN
Feb. 4, 2017; 1:00 pm, CBS	No. 21	Pittsburgh	W 72–64	18–5 (6–4)	21 – Allen	9 – Jefferson	6 – Allen	Cameron Indoor Stadium (9,314); Durham, NC
Feb. 9, 2017; 8:00 pm, ESPN/ACCN	No. 18	No. 8 North Carolina; Rivalry	W 86–78	19–5 (7–4)	25 – Allen	9 – Tatum	5 – Tatum	Cameron Indoor Stadium (9,314); Durham, NC
Feb. 11, 2017; 1:00 pm, ACCN	No. 18	Clemson	W 64–62	20–5 (8–4)	25 – Kennard	9 – Jefferson	5 – Allen	Cameron Indoor Stadium (9,314); Durham, NC
Feb. 15, 2017; 9:00 pm, ESPN2	No. 12	at No. 14 Virginia	W 65–55	21–5 (9–4)	28 – Tatum	8 – Tatum	3 – Kennard	John Paul Jones Arena (14,623); Charlottesville, VA
Feb. 18, 2017; 1:00 pm, ACCN	No. 12	Wake Forest	W 99–94	22–5 (10–4)	23 – Kennard	7 – Tatum	6 – Allen	Cameron Indoor Stadium (9,314); Durham, NC
Feb. 22, 2017; 7:00 pm, ESPN	No. 10	at Syracuse	L 75–78	22–6 (10–5)	23 – Kennard	13 – Tatum	6 – Tatum	Carrier Dome (30,331); Syracuse, NY
Feb. 25, 2017; 4:00 pm, CBS	No. 10	at Miami (FL)	L 50–55	22–7 (10–6)	16 – Jackson	8 – Giles	3 – Jackson	Watsco Center (7,972); Coral Gables, FL
Feb. 28, 2017; 7:00 pm, ESPN	No. 17	No. 15 Florida State	W 75–70	23–7 (11–6)	22 – Jackson	11 – Jefferson	4 – Tatum	Cameron Indoor Stadium (9,14); Durham, NC
Mar. 4, 2017; 8:00 pm, ESPN	No. 17	at No. 5 North Carolina; Rivalry/ESPN College GameDay	L 83–90	23–8 (11–7)	28 – Kennard	6 – Tied	2 – Tied	Dean Smith Center (21,750); Chapel Hill, NC
ACC Tournament
March 8, 2017; 2:00 pm, ESPN	(5) No. 14	vs. (12) Clemson; Second Round	W 79–72	24–8	20 – Tied	10 – Jefferson	4 – Tatum	Barclays Center (17,732); Brooklyn, NY
March 9, 2017; 2:00 pm, ESPN	(5) No. 14	vs. (4) No. 10 Louisville; Quarterfinals	W 81–77	25–8	25 – Tatum	10 – Kennard	3 – Kennard	Barclays Center (17,732); Brooklyn, NY
March 10, 2017; 7:00 pm, ESPN	(5) No. 14	vs. (1) No. 6 North Carolina; Semifinals/Rivalry	W 93–83	26–8	24 – Tatum	7 – Tied	5 – Allen	Barclays Center (18,109); Brooklyn, NY
March 11, 2017; 9:00 pm, ESPN	(5) No. 14	vs. (3) No. 22 Notre Dame; Championship	W 75–69	27–8	19 – Tatum	8 – Tatum	4 – Allen	Barclays Center (18,109); Brooklyn, NY
NCAA tournament
March 17, 2017*; 7:20 pm, TBS	(2 E) No. 7	vs. (15 E) Troy; First Round	W 87–65	28–8	21 – Allen	12 – Tatum	4 – Allen	Bon Secours Wellness Arena (17,732); Greenville, SC
March 19, 2017*; 8:40 pm, TNT	(2 E) No. 7	vs. (7 E) South Carolina; Second Round	L 81–88	28–9	15 – Tied	15 – Jefferson	4 – Jones	Bon Secours Wellness Arena (14,216); Greenville, SC
*Non-conference game. ^{#}Rankings from AP Poll. (#) Tournament seedings in parentheses. E=East Region. All times are in Eastern Time.

== Rankings ==
Ranking movements Legend: ██ Increase in ranking ██ Decrease in ranking ( ) = First-place votes
	Week																			
Poll	Pre	1	2	3	4	5	6	7	8	9	10	11	12	13	14	15	16	17	18	Final
AP	1 (58)	1 (58)	6	5	5	5	5	5	8	7	18	17	21	18	12	10	17	14	7	Not released
Coaches	1 (27)	1 (27)	3 (5)	4 (2)	4 (2)	4 (2)	4 (1)	5 (1)	8	7	18	17	21	19	14	11	14	14	7	13

*AP does not release post-NCAA Tournament rankings.
