= 2016–17 Miami Hurricanes men's basketball team =

American college basketball season

2016–17 Miami Hurricanes men's basketball

NCAA tournament, First Round
- Conference: Atlantic Coast Conference
- Record: 21–12 (10–8 ACC)
- Head coach: Jim Larrañaga (6th season)
- Assistant coaches: Chris Caputo; Jamal Brunt; Adam Fisher
- Home arena: Watsco Center

2016–17 ACC men's basketball standings
	Conf.				Overall
Team	W		L	PCT	W		L	PCT
No. 5 North Carolina	14	–	4	.778	33	–	7	.825
No. 16 Florida State	12	–	6	.667	26	–	9	.743
No. 14 Notre Dame	12	–	6	.667	26	–	10	.722
No. 10 Louisville	12	–	6	.667	25	–	9	.735
No. 7 Duke †	11	–	7	.611	28	–	9	.757
No. 24 Virginia	11	–	7	.611	23	–	11	.676
Virginia Tech	10	–	8	.556	22	–	11	.667
Miami (FL)	10	–	8	.556	21	–	12	.636
Syracuse	10	–	8	.556	19	–	15	.559
Wake Forest	9	–	9	.500	19	–	14	.576
Georgia Tech	8	–	10	.444	21	–	16	.568
Clemson	6	–	12	.333	17	–	16	.515
NC State	0	–	14	.000	0	–	17	.000[3]
Pittsburgh	4	–	14	.222	16	–	17	.485
Boston College	2	–	16	.111	9	–	23	.281
† 2017 ACC tournament winner Rankings from AP poll

The 2016–17 Miami Hurricanes men's basketball team represented the University of Miami during the 2016–17 NCAA Division I men's basketball season. The Hurricanes were members of the Atlantic Coast Conference (ACC). They were led by sixth-year head coach Jim Larrañaga and played their home games at the Watsco Center on the university's campus in Coral Gables, Florida. They finished the season 21–12, 10–8 in ACC play to finish in a three-way tie for seventh place. They defeated Syracuse in the second round of the ACC tournament to advance to the quarterfinals, where they lost to North Carolina. They received an at-large bid to the NCAA tournament as the No. 8 seed in the Midwest region; they lost in the first round to Michigan State.

== Previous season ==
The Hurricanes finished the 2015–16 season 27–8, 13–5 in ACC play to finish in a tie for second place. They defeated Virginia Tech in the quarterfinals of the ACC tournament before losing to Virginia. They received an at-large bid to the NCAA tournament, where they defeated Buffalo and Wichita State to advance to the Sweet Sixteen. There, they lost to eventual national champion Villanova.

== Offseason ==
=== Departures ===
Departures
Name	Number	Pos.	Height	Weight	Year	Hometown	Reason for departure
Sheldon McClellan	10	G	6'5"	200	RS senior	Houston, TX	Graduated
James Palmer Jr.	12	G	6'5"	202	Sophomore	Washington, D.C.	Transferred to Nebraska
Angel Rodríguez	13	G	5'11"	185	RS senior	Cupey, Puerto Rico	Graduated
Tonye Jekiri	23	C	7'0"	248	Senior	Hialeah, FL	Graduated
Ivan Uceda	33	F	6'10"	217	Senior	Madrid, Spain	Graduated

=== Incoming transfers ===
Incoming transfers
Name	Number	Pos.	Height	Weight	Year	Hometown	Previous school
Michael Gilmore	12	F	6'10"	215	Junior	Tallahassee, FL	VCU

=== 2016 recruiting class ===
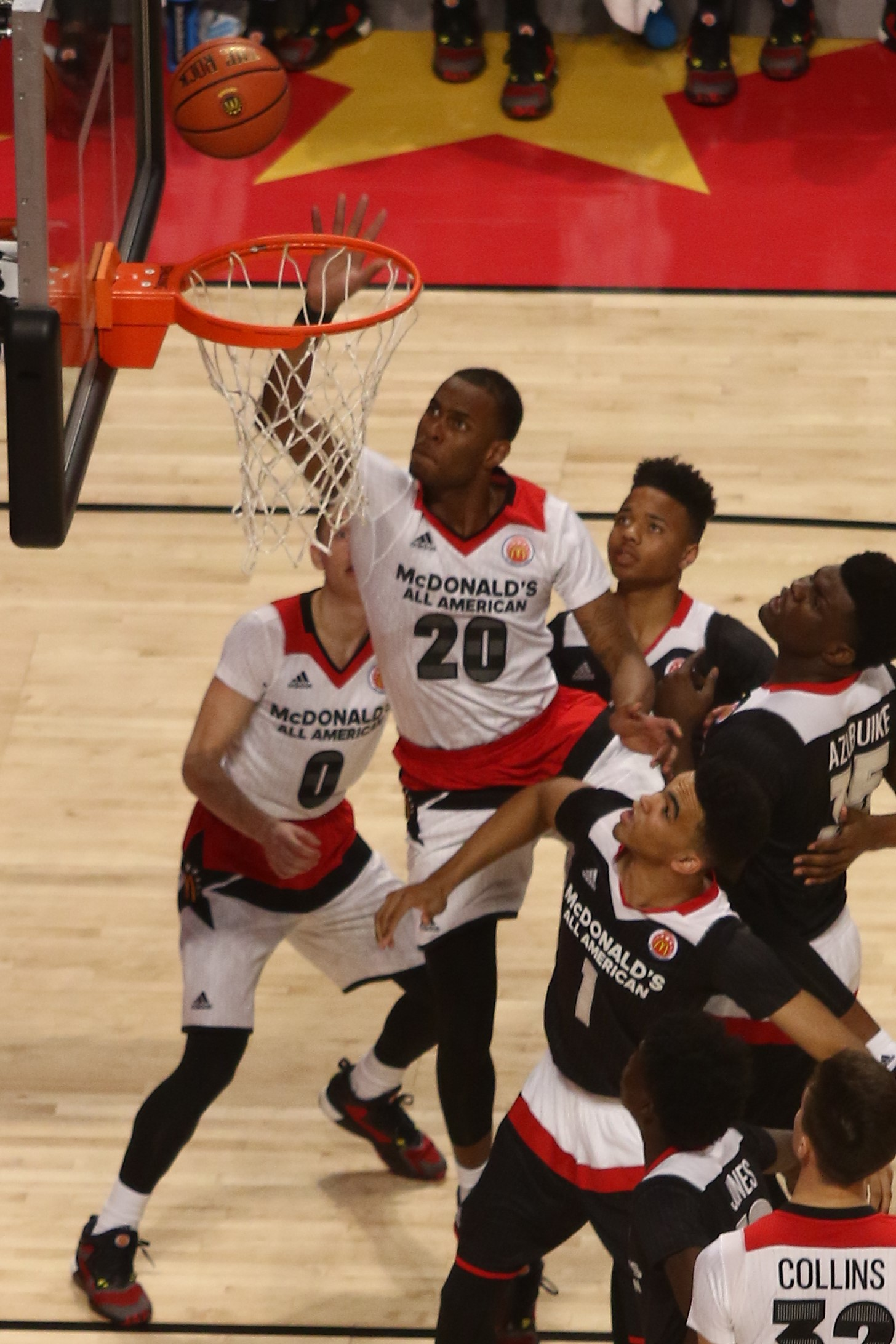
Dewan Huell at the 2016 McDonald's All-American Game

College recruiting
Name	Hometown	School	Height	Weight	Commit date
Bruce Brown, Jr. G	Boston, MA	Vermont Academy	6 ft 4 in (1.93 m)	200 lb (91 kg)	Nov 18, 2015
Bruce Brown, Jr. G	Recruit ratings: Scout: Rivals: 247Sports: ESPN:				
Dewan Huell; F	Miami, FL	Miami Norland High School	6 ft 9 in (2.06 m)	230 lb (100 kg)	Nov 18, 2015
Dewan Huell; F	Recruit ratings: Scout: Rivals: 247Sports: ESPN:				
Rodney Miller, Jr. C	Laurelton, NY	Oak Hill Academy	6 ft 11 in (2.11 m)	230 lb (100 kg)	Aug 10, 2015
Rodney Miller, Jr. C	Recruit ratings: Scout: Rivals: 247Sports: ESPN:				
Dejan Vasiljevic; G	Melbourne, Australia	Australian Institute of Sport	6 ft 2 in (1.88 m)	195 lb (88 kg)	May 3, 2016
Dejan Vasiljevic; G	Recruit ratings: Scout: Rivals: 247Sports: ESPN:				
Overall recruit ranking:
Note: In many cases, Scout, Rivals, 247Sports, On3, and ESPN may conflict in their listings of height and weight.; In these cases, the average was taken. ESPN grades are on a 100-point scale.; Sources: "2016 Team Ranking". Rivals.

== Roster ==
2016–17 Miami Hurricanes men's basketball team
Players
Coaches

Pos.	#	Name	Height	Weight	Year	Hometown
G	0	Ja’Quan Newton	6 ft 2 in (1.88 m)	187 lb (85 kg)	Jr	Philadelphia, PA
G	2	Mike Robinson (W)	5 ft 10 in (1.78 m)	170 lb (77 kg)	So	New Britain, CT
G	3	Anthony Lawrence II	6 ft 7 in (2.01 m)	210 lb (95 kg)	So	St. Petersburg, FL
G	4	Dejan Vasiljevic	6 ft 3 in (1.91 m)	198 lb (90 kg)	Fr	Melbourne, Australia
G	5	Davon Reed	6 ft 6 in (1.98 m)	220 lb (100 kg)	Sr	Ewing, NJ
G	11	Bruce Brown	6 ft 5 in (1.96 m)	190 lb (86 kg)	Fr	Boston, MA
F	12	Michael Gilmore (I) (redshirt)	6 ft 10 in (2.08 m)	215 lb (98 kg)	Jr	Tallahassee, FL
C	14	Rodney Miller, Jr.	7 ft 0 in (2.13 m)	258 lb (117 kg)	Fr	Laurelton, NY
C	15	Ebuka Izundu	6 ft 10 in (2.08 m)	231 lb (105 kg)	So	Charlotte, NC
F	20	Dewan Huell	6 ft 11 in (2.11 m)	220 lb (100 kg)	Fr	Miami, FL
F	21	Kamari Murphy	6 ft 8 in (2.03 m)	220 lb (100 kg)	RS Sr	Brooklyn, NY
F	32	Sam Waardenburg (redshirt)	6 ft 9 in (2.06 m)	205 lb (93 kg)	Fr	Henderson, New Zealand
F	35	Chris Stowell (W)	6 ft 6 in (1.98 m)	208 lb (94 kg)	Jr	Exeter, NH

Head coach

- Jim Larrañaga (Providence)

Assistant coach(es)

- Chris Caputo (Westfield State)
- Jamal Brunt (Randolph–Macon)
- Adam Fisher (Penn State)

Legend

- (C) Team captain
- (S) Suspended
- (I) Ineligible
- (W) Walk-on
- Injured
- Current redshirt

== Schedule and results ==
Date time, TV	Rank^{#}	Opponent^{#}	Result	Record	High points	High rebounds	High assists	Site (attendance) city, state
Exhibition
Nov 2, 2016*; 7:00 pm, ACCN Extra		Barry	W 73–62		21 – Reed	7 – Tied	4 – Tied	Watsco Center (6,542); Coral Gables, FL
Non-conference regular season
Nov 11, 2016*; 7:00 pm, ACCN Extra		Western Carolina	W 92–43	1–0	14 – Izundu	8 – Tied	5 – Brown, Jr.	Watsco Center (7,142); Coral Gables, FL
Nov 16, 2016*; 7:00 pm, ESPN3		at North Florida	W 94–56	2–0	17 – Reed	9 – Murphy	7 – Newton	UNF Arena (3,148); Jacksonville, FL
Nov 19, 2016*; 4:00 pm, ACCN Extra		Penn	W 74–62	3–0	18 – Newton	8 – Murphy	3 – Newton	Watsco Center (6,753); Coral Gables, FL
Nov 24, 2016*; 2:30 pm, ESPN2		vs. Stanford; AdvoCare Invitational First Round	W 67–53	4–0	20 – Newton	7 – Murphy	2 – Tied	HP Field House (2,436); Lake Buena Vista, FL
Nov 25, 2016*; 11:00 am, ESPN2		vs. No. 21 Iowa State; AdvoCare Invitational Semifinals	L 56–73	4–1	21 – Newton	12 – Murphy	3 – Newton	HP Field House (1,876); Lake Buena Vista, FL
Nov 27, 2016*; 4:30 pm, ESPN2		vs. Florida; AdvoCare Invitational 3rd Place	L 56–65	4–2	15 – Tied	10 – Murphy	2 – Reed	HP Field House (2,305); Lake Buena Vista, FL
Nov 30, 2016*; 7:00 pm, ESPNU		Rutgers; ACC–Big Ten Challenge	W 73–61	5–2	18 – Reed	9 – Brown, Jr.	3 – Reed	Watsco Center (7,064); Coral Gables, FL
Dec 3, 2016*; 5:30 pm, ESPN3		vs. Wofford; HoopHall Miami Invitational	W 74–57	6–2	15 – Newton	10 – Murphy	9 – Newton	American Airlines Arena (4,885); Miami, FL
Dec 6, 2016*; 7:00 pm, ACCN Extra		South Carolina State	W 82–46	7–2	17 – Vasiljevic	11 – Brown, Jr.	10 – Brown, Jr.	Watsco Center (6,489); Coral Gables, FL
Dec 16, 2016*; 7:00 pm, ACCN Extra		Florida Atlantic	W 76–56	8–2	21 – Reed	10 – Tied	6 – Tied	Watsco Center (6,857); Coral Gables, FL
Dec 22, 2016*; 7:00 pm, ACCN Extra		George Washington	W 72–64	9–2	17 – Reed	12 – Brown, Jr.	5 – Newton	Watsco Center (6,871); Coral Gables, FL
Dec 28, 2016*; 7:00 pm, ACCN Extra		Columbia	W 78–67	10–2	22 – Newton	9 – Newton	5 – Brown, Jr.	Watsco Center (7,045); Coral Gables, FL
ACC regular season
Dec 31, 2016; 4:30 pm, RSN		NC State	W 81–63	11–2 (1–0)	21 – Newton	10 – Murphy	4 – Brown, Jr.	Watsco Center (6,837); Coral Gables, FL
Jan 4, 2017; 7:00 pm, RSN		at Syracuse	L 55–70	11–3 (1–1)	18 – Vasiljevic	7 – Brown, Jr.	7 – Newton	Carrier Dome (17,393); Syracuse, NY
Jan 12, 2017; 7:00 pm, ESPN2		No. 20 Notre Dame	L 62–67	11–4 (1–2)	21 – Reed	12 – Murphy	3 – Reed	Watsco Center (7,972); Coral Gables, FL
Jan 14, 2017; 12:00 pm, RSN		at Pittsburgh	W 72–46	12–4 (2–2)	18 – Reed	8 – Murphy	5 – Tied	Petersen Events Center (9,714); Pittsburgh, PA
Jan 18, 2017; 8:00 pm, ACCN		at Wake Forest	L 79–96	12–5 (2–3)	24 – Reed	8 – Huell	7 – Newton	LJVM Coliseum (9,691); Winston-Salem, NC
Jan 21, 2017; 8:15 pm, ESPN		at No. 18 Duke; ESPN College GameDay	L 58–70	12–6 (2–4)	19 – Reed	15 – Murphy	4 – Tied	Cameron Indoor Stadium (9,314); Durham, NC
Jan 25, 2017; 9:00 pm, RSN		Boston College	W 78–77	13–6 (3–4)	23 – Newton	7 – Murphy	4 – Tied	Watsco Center (7,139); Coral Gables, FL
Jan 28, 2017; 1:00 pm, CBS		No. 9 North Carolina	W 77–62	14–6 (4–4)	30 – Brown, Jr.	9 – Murphy	5 – Brown, Jr.	Watsco Center (7,563); Coral Gables, FL
Feb 1, 2017; 8:00 pm, ACCN		No. 15 Florida State	L 57–75	14–7 (4–5)	17 – Brown, Jr.	5 – Tied	2 – Newton	Watsco Center (7,279); Coral Gables, FL
Feb 4, 2017; 3:00 pm, ACCN		at NC State	W 77–62	15–7 (5–5)	26 – Reed	7 – Reed	6 – Brown, Jr.	PNC Arena (17,567); Raleigh, NC
Feb 8, 2017; 9:00 pm, RSN		Virginia Tech	W 74–68	16–7 (6–5)	18 – Reed	5 – Tied	6 – Reed	Watsco Center (6,620); Coral Gables, FL
Feb 11, 2017; 2:00 pm, ESPN2		at No. 4 Louisville	L 66–71	16–8 (6–6)	15 – Newton	7 – Brown, Jr.	4 – Brown, Jr.	KFC Yum! Center (21,427); Louisville, KY
Feb 15, 2017; 8:00 pm, ACCN		Georgia Tech	W 70–61	17–8 (7–6)	21 – Reed	8 – Murphy	5 – Brown, Jr.	Watsco Center (7,111); Coral Gables, FL
Feb 18, 2017; 12:00 pm, RSN		Clemson	W 71–65	18–8 (8–6)	15 – Murphy	9 – Murphy	5 – Tied	Watsco Center (6,987); Coral Gables, FL
Feb 20, 2017; 7:00 pm, ESPN		at No. 18 Virginia	W 54–48 ^{OT}	19–8 (9–6)	14 – Brown, Jr.	11 – Murphy	5 – Lawrence II	John Paul Jones Arena (14,623); Charlottesville, VA
Feb 25, 2017; 4:00 pm, CBS		No. 10 Duke	W 55–50	20–8 (10–6)	25 – Brown, Jr.	10 – Reed	4 – Brown, Jr.	Watsco Center (7,972); Coral Gables, FL
Feb 27, 2017; 9:00 pm, ESPN2	No. 25	at Virginia Tech	L 61–66	20–9 (10–7)	18 – Lawrence II	9 – Reed	5 – Brown, Jr.	Cassell Coliseum (6,962); Blacksburg, VA
Mar 4, 2017; 4:00 pm, ACCN	No. 25	at No. 15 Florida State	L 57–66	20–10 (10–8)	22 – Reed	9 – Murphy	6 – Reed	Donald L. Tucker Civic Center (11,675); Tallahassee, FL
ACC tournament
March 8, 2017; 12:00 pm, ESPN	(9)	vs. (8) Syracuse; Second Round	W 62–57	21–10	14 – Reed	9 – Murphy	6 – Newton	Barclays Center (17,732); Brooklyn, NY
March 9, 2017; 12:00 pm, ESPN	(9)	vs. (1) No. 6 North Carolina; Quarterfinals	L 53–78	21–11	21 – Brown, Jr.	7 – Brown, Jr.	3 – Reed	Barclays Center (17,732); Brooklyn, NY
NCAA tournament
March 17, 2017*; 9:20 pm, TBS	(8 MW)	vs. (9 MW) Michigan State; First Round	L 58–78	21–12	16 – Newton	3 – Tied	4 – Brown, Jr.	BOK Center (14,715); Tulsa, OK
*Non-conference game. ^{#}Rankings from AP Poll. (#) Tournament seedings in parentheses. MW=Midwest Region. All times are in Eastern Time.

== Rankings ==
Ranking movements Legend: ██ Increase in ranking ██ Decrease in ranking — = Not ranked RV = Received votes
	Week																			
Poll	Pre	1	2	3	4	5	6	7	8	9	10	11	12	13	14	15	16	17	18	Final
AP	RV	RV	RV	—	—	RV	RV	RV	RV	—	—	—	—	—	—	RV	25	RV	—	Not released
Coaches	RV	RV	RV	RV	—	RV	RV	RV	RV	RV	RV	RV	RV	RV	RV	RV	25	RV	—	—

*AP does not release post-NCAA tournament rankings.
