= 2016–17 Clemson Tigers men's basketball team =

American college basketball season

2016–17 Clemson Tigers men's basketball

NIT, First round
- Conference: Atlantic Coast Conference
- Record: 17–16 (6–12 ACC)
- Head coach: Brad Brownell (7th season)
- Assistant coaches: Mike Winiecki; Dick Bender; Steve Smith
- Home arena: Littlejohn Coliseum

2016–17 ACC men's basketball standings
	Conf.				Overall
Team	W		L	PCT	W		L	PCT
No. 5 North Carolina	14	–	4	.778	33	–	7	.825
No. 16 Florida State	12	–	6	.667	26	–	9	.743
No. 14 Notre Dame	12	–	6	.667	26	–	10	.722
No. 10 Louisville	12	–	6	.667	25	–	9	.735
No. 7 Duke †	11	–	7	.611	28	–	9	.757
No. 24 Virginia	11	–	7	.611	23	–	11	.676
Virginia Tech	10	–	8	.556	22	–	11	.667
Miami (FL)	10	–	8	.556	21	–	12	.636
Syracuse	10	–	8	.556	19	–	15	.559
Wake Forest	9	–	9	.500	19	–	14	.576
Georgia Tech	8	–	10	.444	21	–	16	.568
Clemson	6	–	12	.333	17	–	16	.515
NC State	0	–	14	.000	0	–	17	.000[3]
Pittsburgh	4	–	14	.222	16	–	17	.485
Boston College	2	–	16	.111	9	–	23	.281
† 2017 ACC tournament winner Rankings from AP poll

The 2016–17 Clemson Tigers men's basketball team represented Clemson University during the 2016–17 NCAA Division I men's basketball season. Led by sixth-year head coach Brad Brownell, the Tigers played their home games at Littlejohn Coliseum in Clemson, South Carolina after a one-year of renovation, as members of the Atlantic Coast Conference. They finished the season 17–16, 6–12 in ACC play to finish in 12th place. They defeated NC State in the first round of the ACC tournament to advance to the second round where they lost to Duke. They received an invitation to the National Invitation Tournament where they lost in the first round to Oakland.

== Previous season ==
The Tigers finished the 2015–16 season 17–14, 10–8 in ACC play to finish in a tie for seventh place. They lost in the second round of the ACC tournament to Georgia Tech.

== Departures ==
Name	Number	Pos.	Height	Weight	Year	Hometown	Notes
Austin Ajukwa	1	F	6'6"	205	Junior	Columbia, SC	Transferred to Charlotte
Jordan Roper	20	G	6'0"	165	Senior	Columbia, SC	Graduated
Josh Smith	33	F	6'8"	245	Senior	Charlotte, NC	Graduated
Landry Nnoko	35	C	6'10"	255	Senior	Yaoundé, Cameroon	Graduated

=== Incoming transfers ===
Name	Number	Pos.	Height	Weight	Year	Hometown	Previous School
Elijah Thomas	14	C	6'9"	251	Sophomore	Lancaster, TX	Transferred from Texas A&M. Under NCAA transfer rules, Thomas will have to sit out the first nine games of the 2016–17 season. Will have three years of remaining eligibility.
David Skara	24	F	6'8"	205	Junior	Zadar, Croatia	Transferred from Valparaiso. Under NCAA transfer rules, Skara will have to sit out for the 2016–17 season. Will have two years of remaining eligibility.

== Recruiting class ==
College recruiting information
Name	Hometown	School	Height	Weight	Commit date
Scott Spencer #27 SF	Saint George, VA	Blue Ridge School	6 ft 6 in (1.98 m)	195 lb (88 kg)	Aug 5, 2015
Scott Spencer #27 SF	Recruit ratings: Scout: Rivals: 247Sports: ESPN:				
Overall recruit ranking: Scout: NA Rivals: NA ESPN: NA
Note: In many cases, Scout, Rivals, 247Sports, On3, and ESPN may conflict in their listings of height and weight.; In these cases, the average was taken. ESPN grades are on a 100-point scale.; Sources: "ESPN". ESPN.; "2016 Team Ranking". Rivals.

=== Recruiting class of 2017 ===
College recruiting information (2017)
Name	Hometown	School	Height	Weight	Commit date
A.J. Oliver; SG	Central, SC	D. W. Daniel High School	6 ft 3 in (1.91 m)	175 lb (79 kg)	Dec 1, 2015
A.J. Oliver; SG	Recruit ratings: Scout: Rivals: 247Sports: ESPN:				
Aamir Simms; SF	Dyke, VA	Blue Ridge School	6 ft 8 in (2.03 m)	200 lb (91 kg)	Sep 22, 2016
Aamir Simms; SF	Recruit ratings: Scout: Rivals: 247Sports: ESPN:				
Clyde Trapp Jr; SG	Hopkins, SC	Lower Richland High School	6 ft 5 in (1.96 m)	188 lb (85 kg)	Nov 9, 2016
Clyde Trapp Jr; SG	Recruit ratings: Scout: Rivals: 247Sports: ESPN:				
Malik William; PF	Orlando, FL	First Academy	6 ft 8 in (2.03 m)	200 lb (91 kg)	Jul 26, 2015
Malik William; PF	Recruit ratings: Scout: Rivals: 247Sports: ESPN:				
Overall recruit ranking: Scout: NA Rivals: NA ESPN: NA
Note: In many cases, Scout, Rivals, 247Sports, On3, and ESPN may conflict in their listings of height and weight.; In these cases, the average was taken. ESPN grades are on a 100-point scale.; Sources: "ESPN". ESPN.; "2015 Team Ranking". Rivals.

== Roster ==
2016–17 Clemson Tigers men's basketball team
Players
Coaches

Pos.	#	Name	Height	Weight	Year	Previous school	Hometown
C	00	Legend Robertin	7 ft 0 in (2.13 m)	260 lb (118 kg)	Jr	Chipola College	London, England
G	1	Ty Hudson	6 ft 1 in (1.85 m)	200 lb (91 kg)	So	Pebblebrook High School	Mableton, Georgia
G	2	Marcquise Reed	6 ft 3 in (1.91 m)	185 lb (84 kg)	RS So	Robert Morris	Landover, Maryland
G	3	Lyles Davis (W)	5 ft 11 in (1.8 m)	160 lb (73 kg)	So	James Island Charter High School	Charleston, South Carolina
G	4	Shelton Mitchell	6 ft 3 in (1.91 m)	195 lb (88 kg)	RS So	Vanderbilt	Waxhaw, North Carolina
F	5	Jaron Blossomgame	6 ft 7 in (2.01 m)	220 lb (100 kg)	RS Sr	Chattahoochee High School	Alpharetta, Georgia
G	10	Gabe DeVoe	6 ft 3 in (1.91 m)	210 lb (95 kg)	Jr	Shelby High School (NC)	Shelby, North Carolina
G	11	Isaac Fields (W)	6 ft 1 in (1.85 m)	180 lb (82 kg)	Fr	South Oldham High School	Pewee Valley, Kentucky
G	12	Avry Holmes (w)	6 ft 2 in (1.88 m)	195 lb (88 kg)	GS	North Salem High School	Salem, Oregon
F	14	Elijah Thomas	6 ft 9 in (2.06 m)	230 lb (104 kg)	So	Lancaster High School	Dallas, Texas
F	15	Donte Grantham	6 ft 8 in (2.03 m)	215 lb (98 kg)	Jr	Hargrave Military Academy	Martinsburg, West Virginia
G	22	Scott Spencer	6 ft 6 in (1.98 m)	195 lb (88 kg)	Fr	Blue Ridge School	Suffolk, Virginia
F	24	David Skara (I) (redshirt)	6 ft 8 in (2.03 m)	210 lb (95 kg)	Jr	Valparaiso	Zadar, Croatia
G	44	Riley McGillan (W)	6 ft 0 in (1.83 m)	175 lb (79 kg)	GS	Fort Mill High School	Fort Mill, South Carolina
C	50	Sidy Djitte	6 ft 10 in (2.08 m)	240 lb (109 kg)	Sr	Northwood Temple Academy	Dakar, Senegal

Head coach

- Brad Brownell (DePauw)

Assistant coach(es)

- Mike Winiecki (Richmond)
- Dick Bender (McDaniel)
- Steve Smith (Morgan State)

Legend

- (C) Team captain
- (S) Suspended
- (I) Ineligible
- (W) Walk-on
- Injured
- Current redshirt

Roster

== 2017 NBA draft ==
The Tigers had one player drafted in the 2017 NBA draft.

Player	Team	Round	Pick #	Position
(United States) Jaron Blossomgame	San Antonio Spurs	2nd	59	F

== Schedule and results ==
Date time, TV	Rank^{#}	Opponent^{#}	Result	Record	High points	High rebounds	High assists	Site (attendance) city, state
Exhibition
11/03/2016*; 7:00 pm		Lander	W 105–49		20 – DeVoe	10 – Grantham	5 – Mitchell	Littlejohn Coliseum; Clemson, SC
Non-conference regular season
11/11/2016*; 7:00 pm, ACCN Extra		Georgia	W 74–64	1–0	19 – Reed	9 – Djitte	3 – Blossomgame	Littlejohn Coliseum (9,000); Clemson, SC
11/17/2016*; 11:00 am, ESPNU		vs. Davidson; Tire Pros Invitational quarterfinals	W 95–78	2–0	22 – Holmes	8 – Grantham	4 – Tied	HP Field House; Orlando, FL
11/18/2016*; 1:30 pm, ESPNU		vs. No. 11 Xavier; Tire Pros Invitational semifinals	L 77–83	2–1	21 – Grantham	8 – DeVoe	5 – DeVoe	HP Field House (1,002); Orlando, FL
11/20/2016*; 5:00 pm, ESPNU		vs. Oklahoma; Tire Pros Invitational 3rd place game	L 64–70	2–2	22 – Blossomgame	14 – Djitte	5 – DeVoe	HP Field House; Orlando, FL
11/25/2016*; 7:00 pm, ACCN Extra		High Point	W 83–74	3–2	27 – Blossomgame	15 – Djitte	5 – DeVoe	Littlejohn Coliseum (5,500); Clemson, SC
11/30/2016*; 9:00 pm, ESPNU		Nebraska; ACC–Big Ten Challenge	W 60–58	4–2	15 – Blossomgame	9 – Djitte	3 – Djitte	Littlejohn Coliseum (6,545); Clemson, SC
12/04/2016*; 2:00 pm, ACCN Extra		Coppin State	W 85–43	5–2	15 – Blossomgame	13 – Djitte	2 – Tied	Littlejohn Coliseum (6,711); Clemson, SC
12/10/2016*; 4:00 pm, ACCN Extra		Mercer	W 90–47	6–2	19 – Grantham	7 – Tied	5 – Mitchell	Littlejohn Coliseum (7,514); Clemson, SC
12/13/2016*; 7:00 pm, ESPNU		South Carolina State	W 93–65	7–2	29 – Blossomgame	13 – Djitte	5 – Mitchell	Littlejohn Coliseum (6,333); Clemson, SC
12/18/2016*; 4:00 pm, ESPNU		vs. Alabama	W 67–54	8–2	18 – Mitchell	7 – Djitte	4 – DeVoe	Legacy Arena (11,147); Birmingham, AL
12/21/2016*; 9:00 pm, ESPNU		at No. 22 South Carolina; Rivalry	W 62–60	9–2	15 – Blossomgame	10 – Blossomgame	2 – Blossomgame	Colonial Life Arena (17,026); Columbia, SC
12/28/2016*; 7:00 pm, ACCN Extra		UNC Wilmington	W 87–73	10–2	20 – Blossomgame	8 – Djitte	6 – Mitchell	Littlejohn Coliseum (8,726); Clemson, SC
ACC regular season
12/31/2016; 12:00 pm, RSN		at Wake Forest	W 73–68	11–2 (1–0)	21 – Reed	10 – Grantham	5 – Mitchell	LJVM Coliseum (10,034); Winston-Salem, NC
01/03/2017; 7:00 pm, ESPN2		No. 14 North Carolina	L 86–89 ^{OT}	11–3 (1–1)	24 – Blossomgame	8 – Djitte	4 – Mitchell	Littlejohn Coliseum (8,716); Clemson, SC
01/07/2017; 3:00 pm, ESPNU		at Notre Dame	L 70–75	11–4 (1–2)	22 – Blossomgame	8 – Blossomgame	5 – Mitchell	Edmund P. Joyce Center (9,149); South Bend, IN
01/12/2017; 7:00 pm, RSN		at Georgia Tech	L 63–75	11–5 (1–3)	20 – Blossomgame	6 – Blossomgame	5 – Mitchell	Hank McCamish Pavilion (5,602); Atlanta, GA
01/14/2017; 12:00 pm, ACCN		No. 19 Virginia	L 73–77	11–6 (1–4)	22 – Blossomgame	6 – Tied	5 – DeVoe	Littlejohn Coliseum (9,000); Clemson, SC
01/19/2017; 9:00 pm, ESPN		at No. 12 Louisville	L 60–92	11–7 (1–5)	13 – Reed	5 – Tied	3 – Tied	KFC Yum! Center (21,436); Louisville, KY
01/22/2017; 6:30 pm, ESPNU		Virginia Tech	L 81–82	11–8 (1–6)	20 – Tied	6 – Djitte	10 – Mitchell	Littlejohn Coliseum (7,120); Clemson, SC
01/28/2017; 12:00 pm, RSN		at Pittsburgh	W 67–60	12–8 (2–6)	25 – Blossomgame	8 – Grantham	6 – Mitchell	Peterson Events Center (9,828); Pittsburgh, PA
02/01/2017; 7:00 pm, RSN		Georgia Tech	W 74–62	13–8 (3–6)	18 – Holmes	10 – Thomas	3 – Tied	Littlejohn Coliseum (7,530); Clemson, SC
02/05/2017; 12:30 pm, ESPNU		at No. 15 Florida State	L 61–109	13–9 (3–7)	15 – Holmes	11 – Djitte	3 – Mitchell	Donald L. Tucker Civic Center (10,868); Tallahassee, FL
02/07/2017; 8:00 pm, ACCN		Syracuse	L 81–82	13–10 (3–8)	20 – Blossomgame	11 – Djitte	8 – Mitchell	Littlejohn Coliseum (7,045); Clemson, SC
02/11/2017; 1:00 pm, ACCN		at No. 18 Duke	L 62–64	13–11 (3–9)	23 – Mitchell	9 – Tied	2 – Tied	Cameron Indoor Stadium (9,314); Durham, NC
02/14/2017; 7:00 pm, RSN		Wake Forest	W 95–83	14–11 (4–9)	21 – Reed	10 – Blossomgame	3 – Tied	Littlejohn Coliseum (6,929); Clemson, SC
02/18/2017; 12:00 pm, RSN		at Miami (FL)	L 65–71	14–12 (4–10)	16 – Blossomgame	11 – Thomas	3 – Mitchell	BankUnited Center (6,987); Coral Gables, FL
02/21/2017; 7:00 pm, ESPNU		at Virginia Tech	L 70–71	14–13 (4–11)	18 – Reed	10 – Blossomgame	4 – Mitchell	Cassell Coliseum (7,179); Blacksburg, VA
02/25/2017; 12:00 pm, ACCN		No. 19 Florida State	L 74–76	14–14 (4–12)	24 – Blossomgame	9 – Djitte	4 – Reed	Littlejohn Coliseum (9,000); Clemson, SC
03/01/2017; 8:00 pm, ACCN		NC State	W 78–74	15–14 (5–12)	18 – Tied	9 – Djitte	2 – Tied	Littlejohn Coliseum (6,853); Clemson, SC
03/04/2017; 4:00 pm, ACCN Extra		Boston College	W 82–68	16–14 (6–12)	17 – Tied	10 – Holmes	4 – Reed	Littlejohn Coliseum (8,135); Clemson, SC
ACC tournament
03/07/2017; 12:00 pm, ESPN2	(12)	vs. (13) North Carolina State; First round	W 82–68	17–14	22 – Tied	13 – Djitte	6 – Mitchell	Barclays Center (8,656); Brooklyn, NY
03/08/2017; 2:00 pm, ESPN	(12)	vs. (5) No. 14 Duke; Second round	L 72–79	17–15	19 – Blossomgame	10 – Djitte	3 – Mitchell	Barclays Center (17,732); Brooklyn, NY
NIT
March 14*; 8:00 pm, ESPNU	(2)	(7) Oakland; First round – Iowa Bracket	L 69–74	17–16	24 – Blossomgame	11 – Djitte	6 – Mitchell	Littlejohn Coliseum (2,785); Clemson, SC
*Non-conference game. ^{#}Rankings from AP Poll. (#) Tournament seedings in parentheses. All times are in Eastern Time.
