= Ted Kapita =

Congolese basketball player

Personal information
- Born: July 22, 1996 (age 29) Kinshasa, DR Congo
- Listed height: 6 ft 8 in (2.03 m)
- Listed weight: 245 lb (111 kg)

Career information
- High school: Huntington Prep (Huntington, West Virginia); DME Academy (Daytona Beach, Florida)
- College: NC State (2016–2017)
- NBA draft: 2017: undrafted
- Playing career: 2017–2019
- Position: Forward

Ted Kapita (born July 22, 1996) is a Congolese former professional basketball player. Standing at 6 ft 8 in (2.03 m), he played as forward. Kapita played for the NC State Wolfpack during the 2016–17 season.

== High school career ==
A native of the Democratic Republic of the Congo, Kapita came to the United States to play high school basketball. He attended Huntington Prep in West Virginia and the DME Academy in Florida, before enrolling at the North Carolina State University in 2016. He had originally signed with the University of Arkansas, but did not receive academic clearance.

== College career ==
At NC State, Kapita saw the court in 26 games, averaging 4.3 points and 3.4 rebounds per contest in 2016–17. After the conclusion of his freshman season, he opted to turn professional and enter the 2017 NBA draft. However, he was not selected by any NBA team.

== Professional career ==
In October 2017, Kapita made the training camp roster of the Erie BayHawks, NBA G League affiliate of the Atlanta Hawks, but was waived on October 25, 2017. Before the 2018–19 season, he joined the St. John's Edge of the National Basketball League of Canada for training camp. In 2019, he played nine league games for HKK Zrinjski HT Mostar of Bosnia and Herzegovina.
