= 2015–16 Big 12 Conference men's basketball season =

2015–16 Big 12 Men's Basketball Season
- League: NCAA Division I
- Sport: Basketball
- Teams: 10
- TV partner(s): CBS, ESPN, FSN

Regular Season
- 2016 Big 12 Champions: Kansas
- Season MVP: Buddy Hield
- Top scorer: Buddy Hield

Tournament
- Champions: Kansas
- Runners-up: West Virginia
- Finals MVP: Devonte' Graham

Basketball seasons
- ← 2014–15 2016–17 →

2015–16 Big 12 men's basketball standings
	Conf.				Overall
Team	W		L	PCT	W		L	PCT
No. 1 Kansas †	15	–	3	.833	33	–	5	.868
No. 8 West Virginia	13	–	5	.722	26	–	9	.743
No. 7 Oklahoma	12	–	6	.667	29	–	8	.784
Texas	11	–	7	.611	20	–	13	.606
No. 21 Baylor	10	–	8	.556	22	–	12	.647
No. 22 Iowa State	10	–	8	.556	23	–	12	.657
Texas Tech	9	–	9	.500	19	–	13	.594
Kansas State	5	–	13	.278	17	–	16	.515
Oklahoma State	3	–	15	.167	12	–	20	.375
TCU	2	–	16	.111	12	–	21	.364
† 2016 Big 12 Tournament winner Rankings from AP poll

The 2015–16 Big 12 men's basketball season was the 20th season of basketball for the Big 12 Conference. Team practices began in October 2015, followed by the start of the regular season on November 13. Conference play began on January 2, 2016, and concluded on March 5. Kansas won their 12th straight Big 12 regular season championship by finishing 33–5 overall and 15–3 in conference play, two games ahead of second-place West Virginia. The 2016 Big 12 men's basketball tournament took place from March 9–12, 2016 at the Sprint Center in Kansas City. Kansas won the tournament for the 10th time in school history.

Buddy Hield of Oklahoma was named Big 12 Player of the Year for the second consecutive year, and became just the third player in conference history to be named the National college player of the year.

Seven schools were awarded a berth to the NCAA tournament. Kansas, Oklahoma, and Iowa State each reached the Sweet 16, with Oklahoma advancing all the way to the Final four before losing to the eventual champions Villanova.

== Preseason ==
	Big 12 Coaches	Points
1.	Kansas (9)	81
2.	Oklahoma	70
3.	Iowa State (1)	68
4.	Texas	51
5.	Baylor	49
6.	West Virginia	47
7.	Oklahoma State	33
8.	Kansas State	18
8.	TCU	18
10.	Texas Tech	15

(#) first place votes

Pre-Season All-Big 12 Team

Big 12 Coaches
Isaiah Taylor, G Texas
Buddy Hield, G Oklahoma
Perry Ellis, F Kansas
Georges Niang, F Iowa State
Rico Gathers, F Baylor

- Player of the Year: Buddy Hield, Oklahoma
- Newcomer of the Year: Deonte Burton, Iowa State
- Freshman of the Year: Cheick Diallo, Kansas

Big 12 recruits at the 2015 McDonald's All-American Boys Game

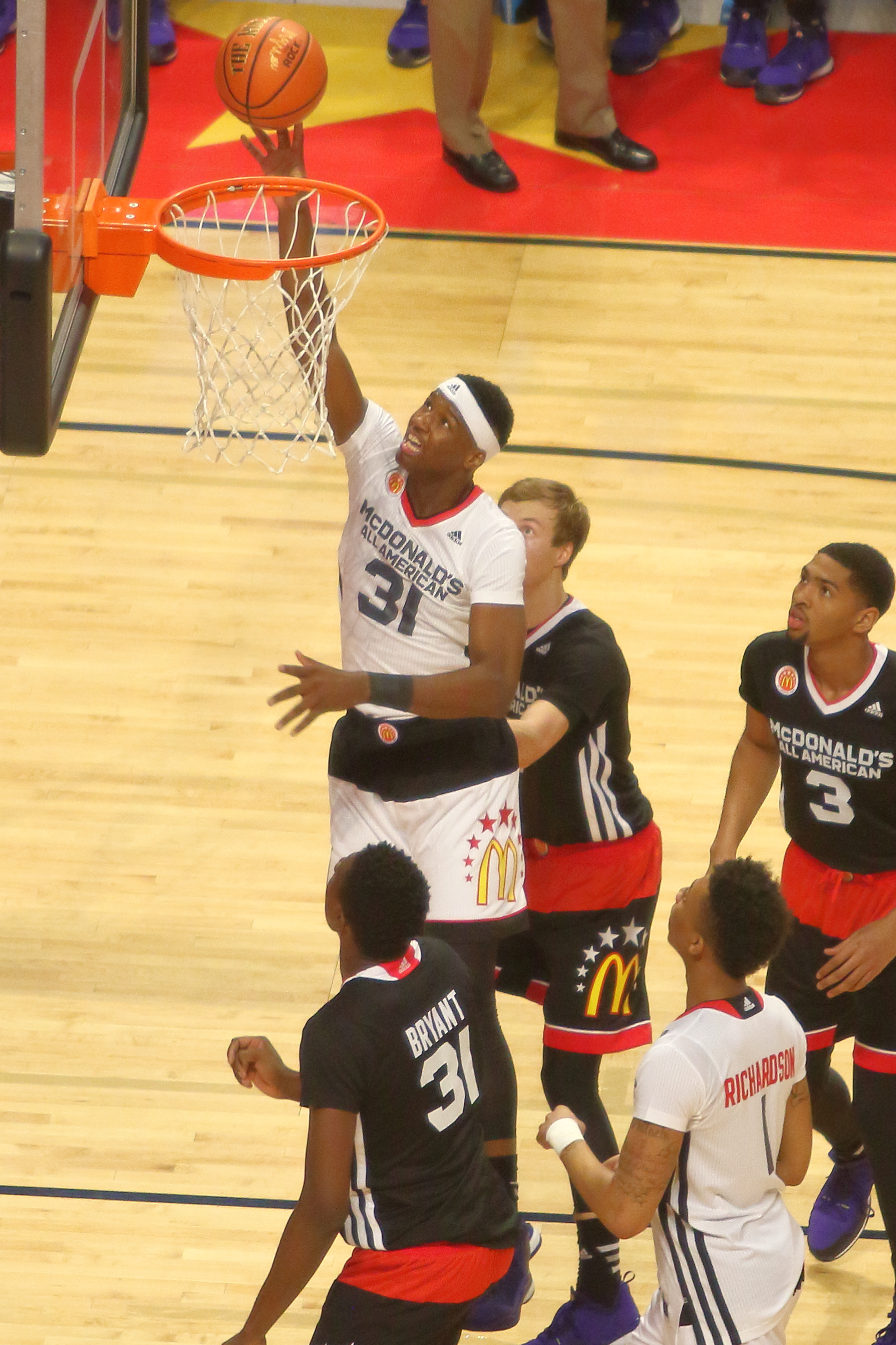
Carlton Bragg, Kansas

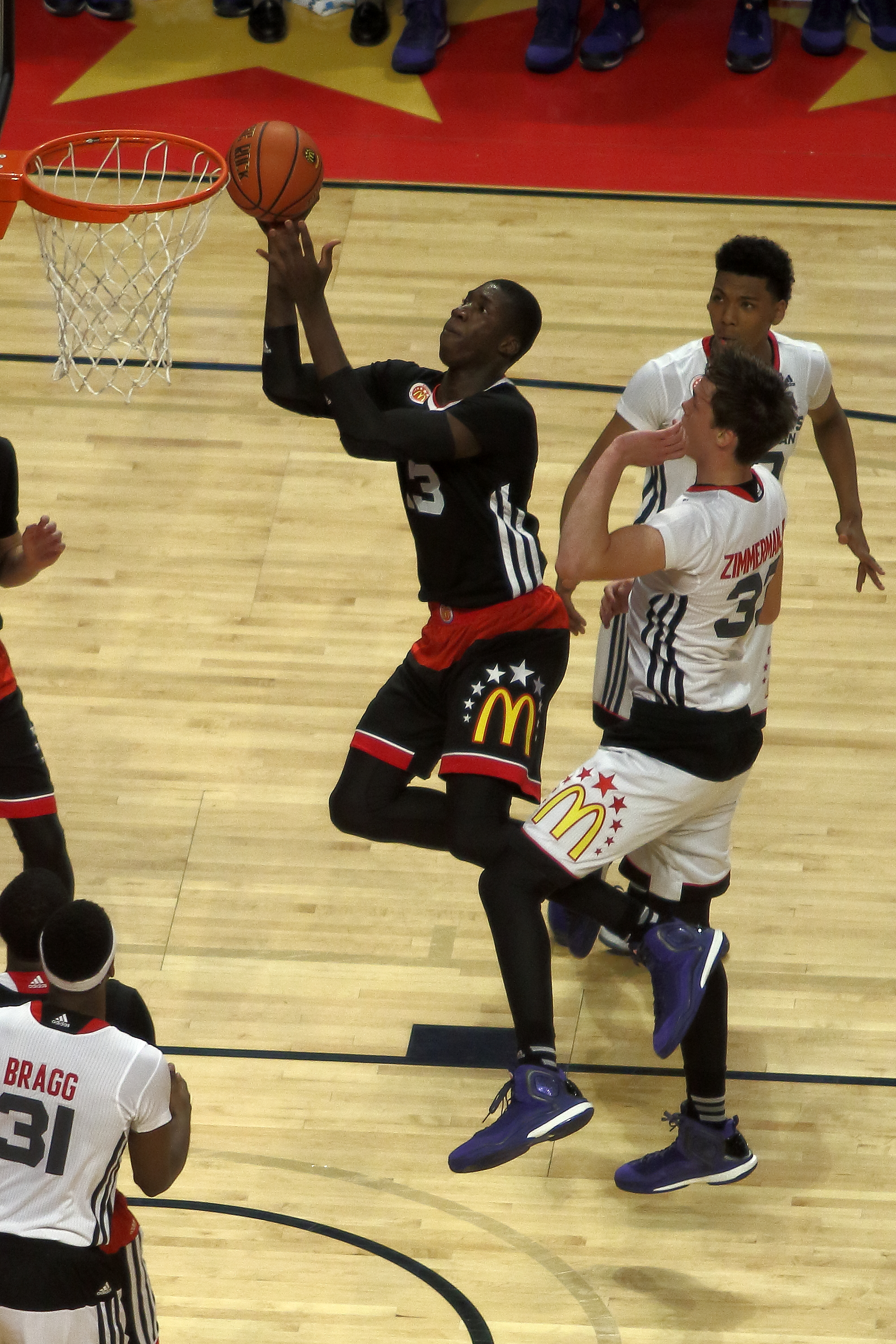
Cheick Diallo, Kansas

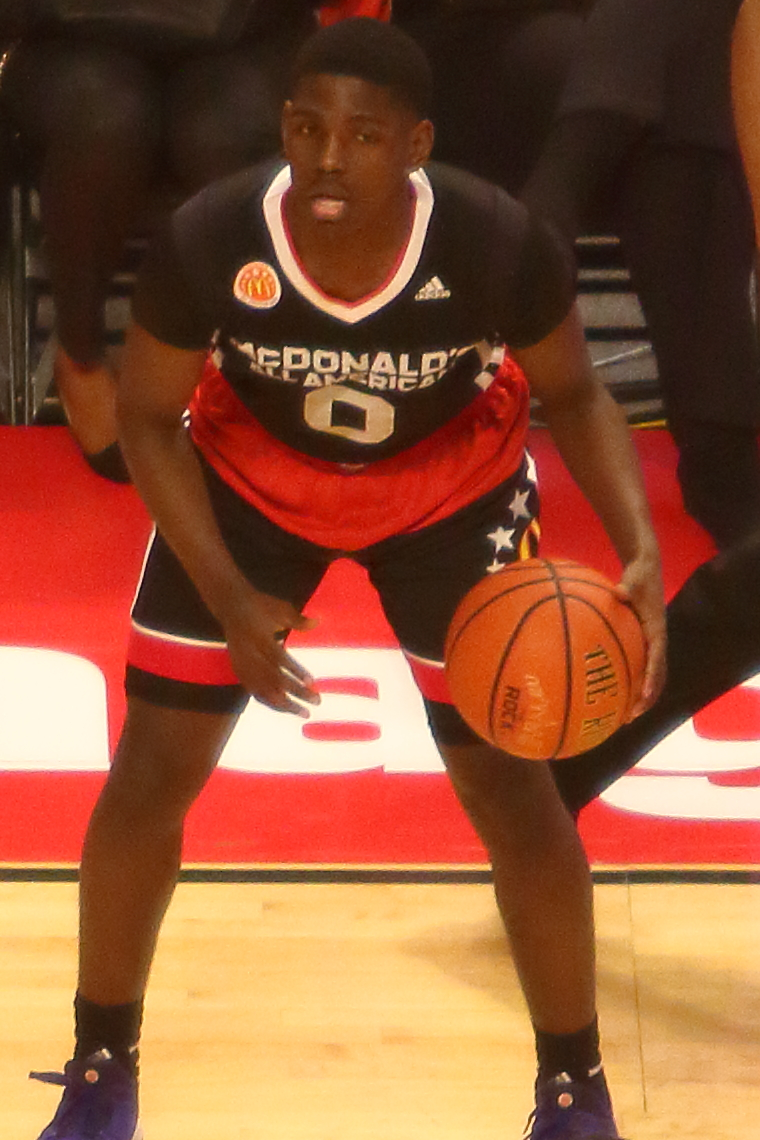
Jawun Evans, OSU

== Rankings ==
Legend
Increase in ranking
Decrease in ranking
Not ranked previous week

		Pre	Wk 2	Wk 3	Wk 4	Wk 5	Wk 6	Wk 7	Wk 8	Wk 9	Wk 10	Wk 11	Wk 12	Wk 13	Wk 14	Wk 15	Wk 16	Wk 17	Wk 18	Wk 19	Final
Baylor	AP	22	20	RV	25	16	16	23	23	RV	22	13	17	15	21	25	19	19	22	21	
Baylor	C	21	21	25	23	15	14	22	21	25	22	15	18	13	19	22	16	17	20	18	24
Iowa State	AP	7	7	4	5	4	5	11	11	13	17	19	14	13	14	13	17	21	21	22	
Iowa State	C	7	7	5	4	2	2	9	9	14	18	21	16	14	15	15	17	20	19	19	15
Kansas	AP	4	4	5	4	2	2	2	2	1	1	3	4	7	6	2	2	1	1	1	
Kansas	C	5	5	7	6	7	5	3	3	2	1	3	3	6	6	2	2	1	1	1	3
Kansas State	AP																				
Kansas State	C					RV															
Oklahoma	AP	8	8	7	6	7	3	3	3	2	2	1	1	1	3	3	3	6	6	7	
Oklahoma	C	8	8	6	8	8	3	2	2	1	2	1	2	2	3	3	4	6	6	7	4
Oklahoma State	AP	RV	RV																		
Oklahoma State	C																				
TCU	AP																				
TCU	C																				
Texas	AP	RV	RV				RV	RV	RV					RV	24	24	25	23	23	RV	
Texas	C	RV					RV	RV	RV				RV	RV	25	25	25	22	22	22	RV
Texas Tech	AP								RV	RV	RV						RV	RV	RV		
Texas Tech	C								RV	RV	RV					RV	RV	RV	RV		
West Virginia	AP	RV	RV	RV	20	14	20	19	19	17	11	6	9	14	10	10	14	10	9	8	
West Virginia	C	23	22	22	15	14	16	18	17	15	10	7	9	12	10	11	12	9	8	8	14

== Regular season ==
=== Conference matrix ===
	Baylor	Iowa State	Kansas	Kansas State	Oklahoma	Oklahoma State	TCU	Texas	Texas Tech	West Virginia
vs. Baylor	—	0–2	2–0	0–2	2–0	0–2	0–2	1–1	1–1	2–0
vs. Iowa State	2–0	—	1–1	0–2	1–1	0–2	0–2	1–1	1–1	2–0
vs. Kansas	0–2	1–1	—	0–2	0–2	1–1	0–2	0–2	0–2	1–1
vs. Kansas State	2–0	2–0	2–0	—	1–1	1–1	0–2	2–0	1–1	2–0
vs. Oklahoma	0–2	1–1	2–0	1–1	—	0–2	0–2	1–1	1–1	0–2
vs. Oklahoma State	2–0	2–0	1–1	1–1	2–0	—	1–1	2–0	2–0	2–0
vs. TCU	2–0	2–0	2–0	2–0	2–0	1–1	—	1–1	2–0	2–0
vs. Texas	1–1	1–1	2–0	0–2	1–1	0–2	1–1	—	1–1	0–2
vs. Texas Tech	1–1	1–1	2–0	1–1	1–1	0–2	0–2	1–1	—	2–0
vs. West Virginia	0–2	0–2	1–1	0–2	2–0	0–2	0–2	2–0	0–2	—
Total	10–8	10–8	15–3	5–13	12–6	3–15	2–16	11–7	9–9	13–5

=== Points scored ===
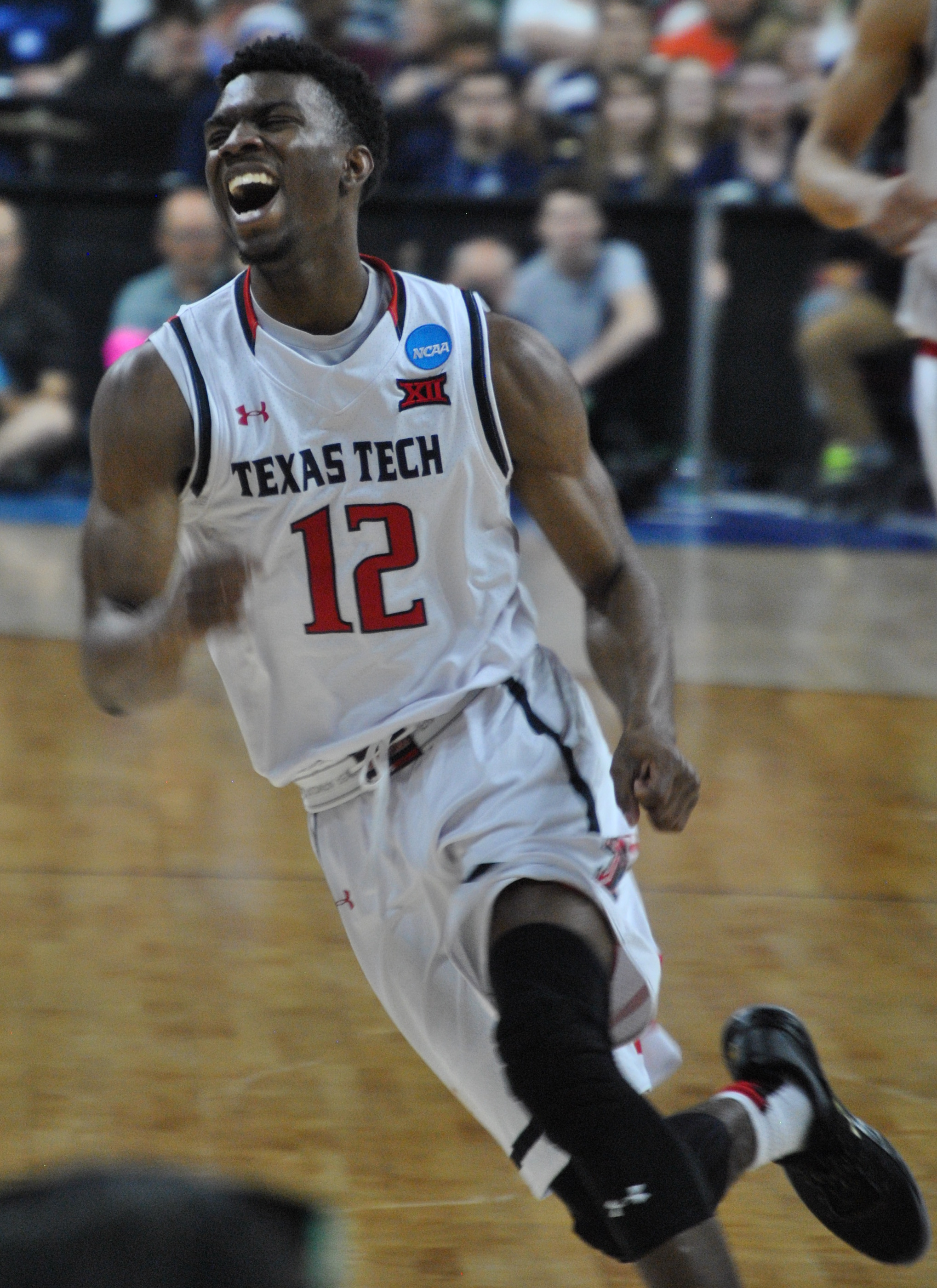
Keenan Evans of Texas Tech

Team	For	Against	Difference
Baylor	1424	1323	101
Iowa State	1448	1392	56
Kansas	1401	1194	207
Kansas State	1251	1293	-42
Oklahoma	1393	1307	86
Oklahoma State	1123	1248	-125
TCU	1129	1370	-241
Texas	1238	1227	11
Texas Tech	1275	1314	-39
West Virginia	1365	1242	123

=== Baylor ===
Baylor Bears Schedule

Date time, TV	Rank^{#}	Opponent^{#}	Result	Record	Site (attendance) city, state
Big 12 regular season
01/02/2016; 3:00 pm, CBS	No. 23	at No. 2 Kansas	L 74–102	10–3 (0–1)	Allen Fieldhouse (16,300); Lawrence, KS
01/05/2016; 7:00 pm, ESPN2		Oklahoma State	W 79–62	11–3 (1–1)	Ferrell Center (5,665); Waco, TX
01/09/2016; 2:00 pm, ESPN2		at No. 13 Iowa State	W 94–89	12–3 (2–1)	Hilton Coliseum (14,384); Ames, IA
01/13/2016; 7:15 pm, ESPNews	No. 22	TCU	W 82–54	13–3 (3–1)	Ferrell Center (5,764); Waco, TX
01/16/2016; 2:00 pm, FSSW	No. 22	at Texas Tech	W 63–60	14–3 (4–1)	United Supermarkets Arena (12,827); Lubbock, TX
01/20/2016; 7:15 pm, ESPNews	No. 13	Kansas State	W 79–72 ^{2OT}	15–3 (5–1)	Ferrell Center (5,588); Waco, TX
01/23/2016; 11:00 am, ESPN	No. 13	No. 1 Oklahoma	L 72–82	15–4 (5–2)	Ferrell Center (10,206); Waco, TX
01/27/2016; 8:00 pm, ESPNU	No. 17	at Oklahoma State	W 69–65	16–4 (6–2)	Gallagher-Iba Arena (7,148); Stillwater, OK
01/30/2016*; 5:00 pm, ESPN2	No. 17	Georgia; Big 12/SEC Challenge	W 83–73	17–4	Ferrell Center (9,675); Waco, TX
02/01/2016; 8:00 pm, ESPN	No. 15	Texas	L 59–67	17–5 (6–3)	Ferrell Center (6,064); Waco, TX
02/06/2016; 7:00 pm, ESPN2	No. 15	at No. 14 West Virginia	L 69–80	17–6 (6–4)	WVU Coliseum (14,069); Morgantown, WV
02/10/2016; 7:15 pm, ESPNews	No. 21	at Kansas State	W 82–72	18–6 (7–4)	Bramlage Coliseum (11,636); Manhattan, KS
02/13/2016; 7:00 pm, ESPNU	No. 21	Texas Tech	L 66–84	18–7 (7–5)	Ferrell Center (7,540); Waco, TX
02/16/2016; 8:00 pm, ESPN2	No. 25	No. 13 Iowa State	W 100–91 ^{OT}	19–7 (8–5)	Ferrell Center (5,556); Waco, TX
02/20/2016; 1:00 pm, ESPN	No. 25	at No. 24 Texas	W 78–64	20–7 (9–5)	Frank Erwin Center (16,175); Austin, TX
02/23/2016; 7:00 pm, ESPN2	No. 19	No. 2 Kansas	L 60–66	20–8 (9–6)	Ferrell Center (8,259); Waco, TX
02/27/2016; 7:00 pm, ESPNU	No. 19	at TCU	W 86–71	21–8 (10–6)	Schollmaier Arena (6,364); Fort Worth, TX
03/01/2016; 7:00 pm, ESPN2	No. 19	at No. 6 Oklahoma	L 71–73	21–9 (10–7)	Lloyd Noble Center (11,563); Norman, OK
03/05/2016; 12:00 pm, ESPN	No. 19	No. 10 West Virginia	L 58–69	21–10 (10–8)	Ferrell Center (7,629); Waco, TX
Big 12 tournament
03/10/2016; 11:30 am, ESPN2	No. 22	vs. No. 23 (4) Texas; Big 12 Tournament quarterfinals	W 75–61	22–10	Sprint Center (18,972); Kansas City, MO
03/11/2016; 6:00 pm, ESPN2	No. 22	vs. No. 1 (1) Kansas; Big 12 Tournament semifinals	L 66–70	22–11	Sprint Center (18,972); Kansas City, MO
*Non-conference game. ^{#}Rankings from AP Poll. (#) Tournament seedings in parentheses. All times are in Central Time.

=== Iowa State ===
Iowa State Cyclones Schedule

Date time, TV	Rank^{#}	Opponent^{#}	Result	Record	Site (attendance) city, state
Big 12 Regular Season
01/02/2016; 6:00 pm, ESPN2	No. 11	at No. 3 Oklahoma	L 83–87	11–2 (0–1)	Lloyd Noble Center (11,251); Norman, OK
01/06/2016; 8:00 pm, ESPNU	No. 13	Texas Tech	W 76–69	12–2 (1–1)	Hilton Coliseum (14,384); Ames, IA
01/09/2016; 2:00 pm, ESPN2	No. 13	Baylor	L 89–94	12–3 (1–2)	Hilton Coliseum (14,384); Ames, IA
01/12/2016; 8:00 pm, ESPN2	No. 18	at Texas	L 91–94 ^{OT}	12–4 (1–3)	Frank Erwin Center (10,663); Austin, TX
01/16/2016; 3:00 pm, ESPNU	No. 18	at Kansas State	W 76–63	13–4 (2–3)	Bramlage Coliseum (12,462); Manhattan, KS
01/18/2016; 8:00 pm, ESPN	No. 19	No. 1 Oklahoma	W 82–77	14–4 (3–3)	Hilton Coliseum (14,384); Ames, IA
01/23/2016; 3:00 pm, ESPNU	No. 19	at TCU	W 73–60	15–4 (4–3)	Schollmaier Arena (6,014); Fort Worth, TX
01/25/2016; 8:00 pm, ESPN	No. 14	No. 4 Kansas	W 85–72	16–4 (5–3)	Hilton Coliseum (14,384); Ames, IA
01/30/2016*; 1:00 pm, ESPN	No. 14	at No. 5 Texas A&M; Big 12/SEC Challenge	L 62–72	16–5	Reed Arena (12,473); College Station, TX
02/02/2016; 8:00 pm, ESPN2	No. 13	No. 14 West Virginia	L 76–81	16–6 (5–4)	Hilton Coliseum (14,384); Ames, IA
02/06/2016; 1:00 pm, ESPN2	No. 13	at Oklahoma State	W 64–59	17–6 (6–4)	Gallagher-Iba Arena (6,561); Stillwater, OK
02/10/2016; 8:00 pm, ESPNU	No. 14	at Texas Tech	L 82–85 ^{OT}	17–7 (6–5)	United Supermarkets Arena (6,715); Lubbock, TX
02/13/2016; 7:30 pm, ESPN	No. 14	No. 24 Texas	W 85–75	18–7 (7–5)	Hilton Coliseum (14,384); Ames, IA
02/16/2016; 8:00 pm, ESPN2	No. 13	at No. 25 Baylor	L 91–100 ^{OT}	18–8 (7–6)	Ferrell Center (5,556); Waco, TX
02/20/2016; 6:00 pm, ESPNU	No. 13	TCU	W 92–83	19–8 (8–6)	Hilton Coliseum (14,384); Ames, IA
02/22/2016; 8:00 pm, ESPN	No. 17	at No. 14 West Virginia	L 87–97	19–9 (8–7)	WVU Coliseum (10,683); Morgantown, WV
02/27/2016; 5:00 pm, ESPN2	No. 17	Kansas State	W 80–61	20–9 (9–7)	Hilton Coliseum (14,384); Ames, IA
02/29/2016; 8:00 pm, ESPNU	No. 21	Oklahoma State	W 58–50	21–9 (10–7)	Hilton Coliseum (14,384); Ames, IA
03/05/2016; 3:00 pm, ESPN	No. 21	at No. 1 Kansas	L 78–85	21–10 (10–8)	Allen Fieldhouse (16,300); Lawrence, KS
Big 12 tournament
03/10/2016; 8:00 pm, ESPNU	No. 21	vs. No. 6 (3) Oklahoma; Big 12 Tournament quarterfinals	L 76–79	21–11	Sprint Center (18,972); Kansas City, MO
*Non-conference game. ^{#}Rankings from AP Poll. (#) Tournament seedings in parentheses. All times are in Central Time.

=== Kansas ===
Kansas Jayhawks Schedule

Date time, TV	Rank^{#}	Opponent^{#}	Result	Record	Site (attendance) city, state
Big 12 regular season
01/02/2016; 3:00 PM, CBS	No. 2	No. 23 Baylor	W 102–74	12–1 (1–0)	Allen Fieldhouse (16,300); Lawrence, KS
01/04/2016; 8:00 PM, ESPN	No. 1	No. 2 Oklahoma	W 109–106 ^{3OT}	13–1 (2–0)	Allen Fieldhouse (16,300); Lawrence, KS
01/09/2016; 8:00 PM, ESPNU	No. 1	at Texas Tech	W 69–59	14–1 (3–0)	United Supermarkets Arena (14,231); Lubbock, TX
01/12/2016; 6:00 PM, ESPN2	No. 1	at No. 11 West Virginia	L 63–74	14–2 (3–1)	WVU Coliseum (12,097); Morgantown, WV
01/16/2016; 1:00 PM, ESPN	No. 1	TCU	W 70–63	15–2 (4–1)	Allen Fieldhouse (16,300); Lawrence, KS
01/19/2016; 6:00 PM, ESPN2	No. 3	at Oklahoma State	L 67–86	15–3 (4–2)	Gallagher-Iba Arena (11,383); Stillwater, OK
01/23/2016; 1:00 PM, ESPN	No. 3	Texas	W 76–67	16–3 (5–2)	Allen Fieldhouse (16,300); Lawrence, KS
01/25/2016; 8:00 PM, ESPN	No. 4	at No. 14 Iowa State	L 72–85	16–4 (5–3)	Hilton Coliseum (14,384); Ames, IA
01/30/2016*; 6:00 PM, ESPN	No. 4	No. 20 Kentucky; Big 12/SEC Challenge	W 90–84 ^{OT}	17–4	Allen Fieldhouse (16,300); Lawrence, KS
02/03/2016; 8:00 PM, ESPNU	No. 7	Kansas State; Sunflower Showdown	W 77–59	18–4 (6–3)	Allen Fieldhouse (16,300); Lawrence, KS
02/06/2016; 11:00 AM, ESPN	No. 7	at TCU	W 75–56	19–4 (7–3)	Schollmaier Arena (6,516); Fort Worth, TX
02/09/2016; 6:00 PM, ESPN2	No. 6	No. 10 West Virginia	W 75–65	20–4 (8–3)	Allen Fieldhouse (16,300); Lawrence, KS
02/13/2016; 1:00 PM, ESPN	No. 6	at No. 3 Oklahoma	W 76–72	21-4 (9–3)	Lloyd Noble Center (12,247); Norman, OK
02/15/2016; 8:00 PM, ESPN	No. 2	Oklahoma State	W 94–67	22–4 (10–3)	Allen Fieldhouse (16,300); Lawrence, KS
02/20/2016; 5:00 PM, ESPN2	No. 2	at Kansas State; Sunflower Showdown	W 72–63	23–4 (11–3)	Bramlage Coliseum (12,528); Manhattan, KS
02/23/2016; 7:00 PM, ESPN2	No. 2	at No. 19 Baylor	W 66–60	24–4 (12–3)	Ferrell Center (8,259); Waco, TX
02/27/2016; 11:00 AM, ESPN	No. 2	Texas Tech	W 67–58	25–4 (13–3)	Allen Fieldhouse (16,300); Lawrence, KS
02/29/2016; 8:00 PM, ESPN	No. 1	at No. 23 Texas	W 86–56	26–4 (14–3)	Frank Erwin Center (16,540); Austin, TX
03/05/2016; 3:00 PM, ESPN	No. 1	No. 21 Iowa State	W 85–78	27–4 (15–3)	Allen Fieldhouse (16,300); Lawrence, KS
Big 12 tournament
03/10/2016; 1:30 PM, ESPN2	No. 1	vs. (8) Kansas State; Big 12 Tournament quarterfinals	W 85–63	28–4	Sprint Center (18,972); Kansas City, MO
03/11/2016; 6:00 PM, ESPN2	No. 1	vs. No. 22 (5) Baylor; Big 12 Tournament semifinals	W 70–66	29–4	Sprint Center (18,972); Kansas City, MO
03/12/2016; 5:00 PM, ESPN	No. 1	vs. No. 9 (2) West Virginia; Big 12 tournament championship	W 81–71	30–4	Sprint Center (19,046); Kansas City, MO
*Non-conference game. ^{#}Rankings from AP Poll. (#) Tournament seedings in parentheses. All times are in Central Time.

=== Kansas State ===
Kansas State Wildcats Schedule

Date time, TV	Rank^{#}	Opponent^{#}	Result	Record	Site (attendance) city, state
Big 12 regular season
01/02/2016; 11:00 am, ESPNU		No. 19 West Virginia	L 83–87 ^{2OT}	10–3 (0–1)	Bramlage Coliseum (12,270); Manhattan, KS
01/05/2016; 7:00 pm, LHN		at Texas	L 57–60	10–4 (0–2)	Erwin Center (10,620); Austin, TX
01/09/2016; 3:30 pm, ESPNews		at No. 2 Oklahoma	L 76–86	10–5 (0–3)	Lloyd Noble Center (11,113); Norman, OK
01/12/2016; 7:00 pm, FSKC		Texas Tech	W 83–70	11–5 (1–3)	Bramlage Coliseum (12,316); Manhattan, KS
01/16/2015; 3:00 pm, ESPNU		No. 18 Iowa State	L 63–76	11–6 (1–4)	Bramlage Coliseum (12,462); Manhattan, KS
01/20/2016; 7:15 pm, ESPNews		at No. 13 Baylor	L 72–79 ^{2OT}	11–7 (1–5)	Ferrell Center (5,588); Waco, TX
01/23/2016; 5:00 pm, ESPNU		Oklahoma State	W 89–73	12–7 (2–5)	Bramlage Coliseum (12,298); Manhattan, KS
01/26/2016; 6:00 pm, ESPNews		at No. 9 West Virginia	L 55–70	12–8 (2–6)	WVU Coliseum (9,936); Morgantown, WV
01/30/2016*; 1:00 pm, ESPNU		Ole Miss; Big 12/SEC Challenge	W 69–64	13–8	Bramlage Coliseum (12,528); Manhattan, KS
02/03/2016; 8:00 pm, ESPN2		at No. 7 Kansas; Sunflower Showdown	L 59–77	13–9 (2–7)	Allen Fieldhouse (16,300); Lawrence, KS
02/06/2016; 5:00 pm, ESPNU		No. 1 Oklahoma	W 80–69	14–9 (3–7)	Bramlage Coliseum (12,528); Manhattan, KS
02/10/2016; 7:15 pm, ESPNews		No. 21 Baylor	L 72–82	14–10 (3–8)	Bramlage Coliseum (11,636); Manhattan, KS
02/13/2016; 12:00 pm, ESPNews		at Oklahoma State	L 55–58	14–11 (3–9)	Gallagher-Iba Arena (4,407); Stillwater, OK
02/16/2016; 7:00 pm, ESPNews		at TCU	W 63–49	15–11 (4–9)	Schollmaier Arena (4,999); Fort Worth, TX
02/20/2016; 5:00 pm, ESPN2		No. 2 Kansas; Sunflower Showdown	L 63–72	15–12 (4–10)	Bramlage Coliseum (12,528); Manhattan, KS
02/22/2015; 6:00 pm, ESPNU		No. 25 Texas	L 70–71	15–13 (4–11)	Bramlage Coliseum (11,629); Manhattan, KS
02/27/2016; 5:00 pm, ESPN2		at No. 17 Iowa State	L 61–80	15–14 (4–12)	Hilton Coliseum (14,384); Ames, IA
03/02/2016; 7:00 pm, FSKC		TCU	W 79–54	16–14 (5–12)	Bramlage Coliseum (11,518); Manhattan, KS
03/05/2016; 2:00 pm, ESPNews		at Texas Tech	L 71–80	16–15 (5–13)	United Supermarkets Arena (12,359); Lubbock, TX
Big 12 tournament
03/09/2016; 6:00 pm, ESPNU		vs. (9) Oklahoma State; Big 12 Tournament 1st Round	W 75–71	17–15	Sprint Center (18,972); Kansas City, MO
03/10/2016; 1:30 pm, ESPN2		vs. No. 1 (1) Kansas; Big 12 Tournament quarterfinals	L 63–85	17–16	Sprint Center (18,972); Kansas City, MO
*Non-conference game. ^{#}Rankings from AP Poll. (#) Tournament seedings in parentheses. All times are in Central Time.

=== Oklahoma ===
Oklahoma Sooners Schedule

Date time, TV	Rank^{#}	Opponent^{#}	Result	Record	Site (attendance) city, state
Big 12 regular season
01/02/2016; 6:00 pm, ESPN2	No. 3	No. 11 Iowa State	W 87–83	12–0 (1–0)	Lloyd Noble Center (11,251); Norman, OK
01/04/2016; 8:00 pm, ESPN	No. 2	at No. 1 Kansas	L 106–109 ^{3OT}	12–1 (1–1)	Allen Fieldhouse (16,300); Lawrence, KS
01/09/2016; 3:30 pm, ESPNews	No. 2	Kansas State	W 86–76	13–1 (2–1)	Lloyd Noble Center (11,113); Norman, OK
01/13/2016; 8:00 pm, ESPNU	No. 2	at Oklahoma State; Bedlam Series	W 74–72	14–1 (3–1)	Gallagher-Iba Arena (9,380); Stillwater, OK
01/16/2016; 3:00 pm, ESPN2	No. 2	No. 11 West Virginia	W 70–68	15–1 (4–1)	Lloyd Noble Center (11,933); Norman, OK
01/18/2016; 8:00 pm, ESPN	No. 1	at No. 19 Iowa State	L 77–82	15–2 (4–2)	Hilton Coliseum (14,384); Ames, IA
01/23/2016; 11:00 am, ESPN	No. 1	at No. 13 Baylor	W 82–72	16–2 (5–2)	Ferrell Center (10,206); Waco, TX
01/26/2016; 6:00 pm, ESPN2	No. 1	Texas Tech	W 91–67	17–2 (6–2)	Lloyd Noble Center (10,682); Norman, OK
01/30/2016*; 4:00 pm, ESPN	No. 1	at LSU; Big 12/SEC Challenge	W 77–75	18–2	Maravich Center (13,882); Baton Rouge, LA
02/02/2016; 7:00 pm, ESPNews	No. 1	TCU	W 95–72	19–2 (7–2)	Lloyd Noble Center (7,455); Norman, OK
02/06/2016; 5:00 pm, ESPNU	No. 1	at Kansas State	L 69–80	19–3 (7–3)	Bramlage Coliseum (12,528); Manhattan, KS
02/08/2016; 8:00 pm, ESPN	No. 3	No. 24 Texas	W 63–60	20–3 (8–3)	Lloyd Noble Center (10,014); Norman, OK
02/13/2016; 1:00 pm, ESPN	No. 3	No. 6 Kansas	L 72–76	20–4 (8–4)	Lloyd Noble Center (12,247); Norman, OK
02/17/2016; 8:00 pm, ESPNU	No. 3	at Texas Tech	L 63–65	20–5 (8–5)	United Supermarkets Arena (14,471); Lubbock, TX
02/20/2016; 3:00 pm, ESPN	No. 3	at No. 10 West Virginia	W 76–62	21–5 (9–5)	WVU Coliseum (15,289); Morgantown, WV
02/24/2016; 8:00 pm, ESPNU	No. 3	Oklahoma State; Bedlam Series	W 71–49	22–5 (10–5)	Lloyd Noble Center (11,470); Norman, OK
02/27/2016; 1:00 pm, CBS	No. 3	at No. 25 Texas	L 63–76	22–6 (10–6)	Frank Erwin Center (16,540); Austin, TX
03/01/2016; 7:00 pm, ESPN2	No. 6	No. 19 Baylor	W 73–71	23–6 (11–6)	Lloyd Noble Center (11,563); Norman, OK
03/05/2016; 12:00 pm, ESPNews	No. 6	at TCU	W 75–67	24–6 (12–6)	Schollmaier Arena (6,532); Fort Worth, TX
Big 12 tournament
03/10/2016; 8:00 pm, ESPNU	No. 6	vs. No. 21 (6) Iowa State; Big 12 Tournament quarterfinals	W 79–76	25–6	Sprint Center (18,972); Kansas City, MO
03/11/2016; 8:00 pm, ESPN2	No. 6	vs. No. 9 (2) West Virginia; Big 12 Tournament semifinals	L 67–69	25–7	Sprint Center (18,972); Kansas City, MO
*Non-conference game. ^{#}Rankings from AP Poll. (#) Tournament seedings in parentheses. All times are in Central Time.

=== Oklahoma State ===
Oklahoma State Cowboys Schedule

Date time, TV	Rank^{#}	Opponent^{#}	Result	Record	Site (attendance) city, state
Big 12 regular season
01/02/2016; 1:00 pm, ESPNews		TCU	W 69–48	9–4 (1–0)	Gallagher-Iba Arena (5,191); Stillwater, OK
01/05/2016; 7:00 pm, ESPNU		at Baylor	L 62–79	9–5 (1–1)	Ferrell Center (5,665); Waco, TX
01/09/2016; 12:00 pm, ESPNU		at No. 17 West Virginia	L 60–77	9–6 (1–2)	WVU Coliseum (11,219); Morgantown, WV
01/13/2016; 8:00 pm, ESPNU		No. 2 Oklahoma; Bedlam Series	L 72–74	9–7 (1–3)	Gallagher-Iba Arena (9,380); Stillwater, OK
01/16/2016; 5:00 pm, ESPN2		at Texas	L 69–74	9–8 (1–4)	Frank Erwin Center (13,241); Austin, TX
01/19/2016; 6:00 pm, ESPN2		No. 3 Kansas	W 86–67	10–8 (2–4)	Gallagher-Iba Arena (11,383); Stillwater, OK
01/23/2016; 5:00 pm, ESPNU		at Kansas State	L 73–89	10–9 (2–5)	Bramlage Coliseum (12,298); Manhattan, KS
01/27/2016; 8:00 pm, ESPNU		No. 17 Baylor	L 65–69	10–10 (2–6)	Gallagher-Iba Arena (7,148); Stillwater, OK
01/30/2016*; 7:00 pm, ESPN2		at Auburn; Big 12/SEC Challenge	W 74–63	11–10	Auburn Arena (8,867); Auburn, AL
02/03/2016; 6:00 pm, ESPNews		at Texas Tech	L 61–63 ^{OT}	11–11 (2–7)	United Supermarkets Arena (8,734); Lubbock, TX
02/06/2016; 1:00 pm, ESPN2		No. 13 Iowa State	L 59–64	11–12 (2–8)	Gallagher-Iba Arena (6,561); Stillwater, OK
02/08/2016; 6:00 pm, ESPNU		at TCU	L 56–63	11–13 (2–9)	Schollmaier Arena (4,957); Fort Worth, TX
02/13/2016; 12:00 pm, ESPNews		Kansas State	W 58–55	12–13 (3–9)	Gallagher-Iba Arena (4,407); Stillwater, OK
02/15/2016; 8:00 pm, ESPN		at No. 2 Kansas	L 67–94	12–14 (3–10)	Allen Fieldhouse (16,300); Lawrence, KS
02/20/2016; 8:30 pm, ESPNU		Texas Tech	L 61–71	12–15 (3–11)	Gallagher-Iba Arena (5,814); Stillwater, OK
02/24/2016; 8:00 pm, ESPNU		at No. 3 Oklahoma; Bedlam Series	L 49–71	12–16 (3–12)	Lloyd Noble Center (11,470); Norman, OK
02/27/2016; 5:00 pm, ESPNU		No. 14 West Virginia	L 56–70	12–17 (3–13)	Gallagher-Iba Arena (5,539); Stillwater, OK
02/29/2016; 6:00 pm, ESPNU		at No. 21 Iowa State	L 50–58	12–18 (3–14)	Hilton Coliseum (14,384); Ames, IA
03/04/2016; 8:00 pm, ESPN2		No. 23 Texas	L 50–62	12–19 (3–15)	Gallagher-Iba Arena (4,023); Stillwater, OK
Big 12 tournament
03/09/2016; 6:00 pm, ESPNU		vs. (8) Kansas State; Big 12 Tournament 1st Round	L 71–75	12–20	Sprint Center (18,972); Kansas City, MO
*Non-conference game. ^{#}Rankings from AP Poll. (#) Tournament seedings in parentheses. All times are in Central Time.

=== TCU ===
TCU Horned Frogs Schedule

Date time, TV	Rank^{#}	Opponent^{#}	Result	Record	Site (attendance) city, state
Big 12 regular season
01/02/2016; 1:00 pm, ESPNews		at Oklahoma State	L 48–69	8–5 (0–1)	Gallagher-Iba Arena (5,191); Stillwater, OK
01/04/2016; 6:00 pm, ESPN2		No. 17 West Virginia	L 87–95	8–6 (0–2)	Schollmaier Arena (4,239); Fort Worth, TX
01/09/2016; 6:00 pm, ESPNU		Texas	W 58–57	9–6 (1–2)	Schollmaier Arena (6,673); Fort Worth, TX
01/13/2016; 7:15 pm, ESPNews		at No. 22 Baylor	L 54–82	9–7 (1–3)	Ferrell Center (5,764); Waco, TX
01/16/2016; 1:00 pm, ESPN		at No. 1 Kansas	L 63–70	9–8 (1–4)	Allen Fieldhouse (16,300); Lawrence, KS
01/18/2016; 6:00 pm, ESPNU		Texas Tech	L 69–76	9–9 (1–5)	Schollmaier Arena (5,905); Fort Worth, TX
01/23/2016; 3:00 pm, ESPNU		No. 19 Iowa State	L 60–73	9–10 (1–6)	Schollmaier Arena (6,014); Fort Worth, TX
01/26/2016; 7:00 pm, LHN		at Texas	L 54–71	9–11 (1–7)	Frank Erwin Center (11,282); Austin, TX
01/30/2016*; 1:00 pm, ESPN2		Tennessee; Big 12/SEC Challenge	W 75–63	10–11	Schollmaier Arena (5,761); Fort Worth, TX
02/02/2016; 7:00 pm, ESPNews		at No. 1 Oklahoma	L 72–95	10–12 (1–8)	Lloyd Noble Center (7,455); Norman, OK
02/06/2016; 11:00 am, ESPN		No. 7 Kansas	L 56–75	10–13 (1–9)	Schollmaier Arena (6,516); Fort Worth, TX
02/08/2016; 6:00 pm, ESPNU		Oklahoma State	W 63–56	11–13 (2–9)	Schollmaier Arena (4,957); Fort Worth, TX
02/13/2016; 11:00 am, ESPNU		at No. 10 West Virginia	L 42–73	11–14 (2–10)	WVU Coliseum (13,137); Morgantown, WV
02/16/2016; 7:00 pm, ESPNews		Kansas State	L 49–63	11–15 (2–11)	Schollmaier Arena (4,999); Fort Worth, TX
02/20/2016; 6:30 pm, ESPNU		at No. 13 Iowa State	L 83–92	11–16 (2–12)	Hilton Coliseum (14,384); Ames, IA
02/23/2016; 8:00 pm, ESPNews		at Texas Tech	L 79–83	11–17 (2–13)	United Supermarkets Arena (10,023); Lubbock, TX
02/27/2016; 7:00 pm, ESPNU		No. 19 Baylor	L 71–86	11–18 (2–14)	Schollmaier Arena (6,364); Fort Worth, TX
03/02/2016; 7:00 pm, FSSW		at Kansas State	L 54–79	11–19 (2–15)	Bramlage Coliseum (11,518); Manhattan, KS
03/05/2016; 12:00 pm, ESPNews		No. 6 Oklahoma	L 67–75	11–20 (2–16)	Schollmaier Arena (6,532); Fort Worth, TX
Big 12 tournament
03/09/2016; 8:00 pm, ESPNU		vs. (7) Texas Tech; Big 12 Tournament 1st Round	W 67–62	12–20	Sprint Center (18,972); Kansas City, MO
03/10/2016; 6:00 pm, ESPNU		vs. No. 9 (2) West Virginia; Big 12 Tournament quarterfinals	L 66–86	12–21	Sprint Center (18,972); Kansas City, MO
*Non-conference game. ^{#}Rankings from AP Poll. (#) Tournament seedings in parentheses. All times are in Central Time.

=== Texas ===
Texas Longhorns Schedule

Date time, TV	Rank^{#}	Opponent^{#}	Result	Record	Site (attendance) city, state
Big 12 regular season
01/02/2016; 1:00 pm, ESPNU		at Texas Tech	L 74–82	8–5 (0–1)	United Supermarkets Arena (12,689); Lubbock, TX
01/05/2016; 7:00 pm, LHN		Kansas State	W 60–57	9–5 (1–1)	Frank Erwin Center (10,620); Austin, TX
01/09/2016; 6:00 pm, ESPNU		at TCU	L 57–58	9–6 (1–2)	Schollmaier Arena (6,673); Fort Worth, TX
01/12/2016; 8:00 pm, ESPN2		No. 18 Iowa State	W 94–91 ^{OT}	10–6 (2–2)	Frank Erwin Center (10,663); Austin, TX
01/16/2016; 5:00 pm, ESPN2		Oklahoma State	W 74–69	11–6 (3–2)	Frank Erwin Center (13,241); Austin, TX
01/20/2016; 6:00 pm, ESPNU		at No. 6 West Virginia	W 56–49	12–6 (4–2)	WVU Coliseum (9,881); Morgantown, WV
01/23/2016; 1:00 pm, ESPN		at No. 3 Kansas	L 67–76	12–7 (4–3)	Allen Fieldhouse (16,300); Lawrence, KS
01/26/2016; 7:00 pm, LHN		TCU	W 71–54	13–7 (5–3)	Frank Erwin Center (11,282); Austin, TX
01/30/2016*; 11:00 am, ESPN2		Vanderbilt; Big 12/SEC Challenge	W 72–58	14–7	Frank Erwin Center (13,041); Austin, TX
02/01/2016; 8:00 pm, ESPN		at No. 15 Baylor	W 67–59	15–7 (6–3)	Ferrell Center (6,064); Waco, TX
02/6/2016; 1:00 pm, LHN		Texas Tech	W 69–59	16–7 (7–3)	Frank Erwin Center (14,951); Austin, TX
02/08/2016; 8:00 pm, ESPN	No. 24	at No. 3 Oklahoma	L 60–63	16–8 (7–4)	Lloyd Noble Center (10,014); Norman, OK
02/13/2016; 7:30 pm, ESPN	No. 24	at No. 14 Iowa State	L 75–85	16–9 (7–5)	Hilton Coliseum (14,384); Ames, IA
02/16/2016; 6:00 pm, ESPN2	No. 24	No. 10 West Virginia	W 85–78	17–9 (8–5)	Frank Erwin Center (12,284); Austin, TX
02/20/2016; 1:00 pm, ESPN	No. 24	No. 25 Baylor	L 64–78	17–10 (8–6)	Frank Erwin Center (16,175); Austin, TX
02/22/2016; 6:00 pm, ESPNU	No. 25	at Kansas State	W 71–70	18–10 (9–6)	Bramlage Coliseum (11,629); Manhattan, KS
02/27/2016; 1:00 pm, CBS	No. 25	No. 3 Oklahoma	W 76–63	19–10 (10–6)	Frank Erwin Center (16,540); Austin, TX
02/29/2016; 8:00 pm, ESPN	No. 23	No. 1 Kansas	L 56–86	19–11 (10–7)	Frank Erwin Center (16,540); Austin, TX
03/04/2016; 8:00 pm, ESPN2	No. 23	at Oklahoma State	W 62–50	20–11 (11–7)	Gallagher-Iba Arena (4,023); Stillwater, OK
Big 12 tournament
03/10/2016; 11:30 am, ESPN2	No. 23	vs. No. 22 (5) Baylor; Big 12 Tournament quarterfinals	L 61–75	20–12	Sprint Center (18,972); Kansas City, MO
*Non-conference game. ^{#}Rankings from AP Poll. (#) Tournament seedings in parentheses. All times are in Central Time.

=== Texas Tech ===
Texas Tech Red Raiders Schedule

Date time, TV	Rank^{#}	Opponent^{#}	Result	Record	Site (attendance) city, state
Big 12 regular season
01/02/2016; 1:00 pm, ESPNU		Texas	W 82–74	11–1 (1–0)	United Supermarkets Arena (12,689); Lubbock, TX
01/06/2016; 8:00 pm, ESPNU		at No. 13 Iowa State	L 69–76	11–2 (1–1)	Hilton Coliseum (14,384); Ames, IA
01/09/2016; 8:00 pm, ESPNU		No. 1 Kansas	L 59–69	11–3 (1–2)	United Supermarkets Arena (14,231); Lubbock, TX
01/12/2016; 7:00 pm, FSSW		at Kansas State	L 70–83	11–4 (1–3)	Bramlage Coliseum (12,316); Manhattan, KS
01/16/2016; 2:00 pm, FSSW		No. 22 Baylor	L 60–63	11–5 (1–4)	United Supermarkets Arena (12,827); Lubbock, TX
01/18/2016; 6:00 pm, ESPNU		at TCU	W 76–69	12–5 (2–4)	Schollmaier Arena (5,905); Fort Worth, TX
01/23/2016; 12:00 pm, ESPNews		No. 6 West Virginia	L 76–80	12–6 (2–5)	United Supermarkets Arena (10,732); Lubbock, TX
01/26/2016; 6:00 pm, ESPN2		at No. 1 Oklahoma	L 67–91	12–7 (2–6)	Lloyd Noble Center (10,682); Norman, OK
01/30/2016*; 3:00 pm, ESPNU		at Arkansas; Big 12/SEC Challenge	L 68–75 ^{OT}	12–8	Bud Walton Arena (15,975); Fayetteville, AR
02/03/2016; 6:00 pm, ESPNews		Oklahoma State	W 63–61 ^{OT}	13–8 (3–6)	United Supermarkets Arena (8,734); Lubbock, TX
02/06/2016; 1:00 pm, LHN		at Texas	L 59–69	13–9 (3–7)	Frank Erwin Center (14,951); Austin, TX
02/10/2016; 8:00 pm, ESPNU		No. 14 Iowa State	W 85–82 ^{OT}	14–9 (4–7)	United Supermarkets Arena (6,715); Lubbock, TX
02/13/2016; 7:00 pm, ESPNU		at No. 21 Baylor	W 84–66	15–9 (5–7)	Ferrell Center (7,540); Waco, TX
02/17/2016; 8:00 pm, ESPNU		No. 3 Oklahoma	W 65–63	16–9 (6–7)	United Supermarkets Arena (14,471); Lubbock, TX
02/20/2016; 8:30 pm, ESPNU		at Oklahoma State	W 71–61	17–9 (7–7)	Gallagher-Iba Arena (5,814); Stillwater, OK
02/23/2016; 8:00 pm, ESPNews		TCU	W 83–79	18–9 (8–7)	United Supermarkets Arena (10,023); Lubbock, TX
02/27/2016; 11:00 am, ESPN		at No. 2 Kansas	L 58–67	18–10 (8–8)	Allen Fieldhouse (16,300); Lawrence, KS
03/02/2016; 6:00 pm, ESPNU		at No. 10 West Virginia	L 68–90	18–11 (8–9)	WVU Coliseum (12,680); Morgantown, WV
03/05/2016; 2:00 pm, ESPNews		Kansas State	W 80–71	19–11 (9–9)	United Supermarkets Arena (12,359); Lubbock, TX
Big 12 tournament
03/09/2016; 8:00 pm, ESPNU		vs. (10) TCU; Big 12 Tournament 1st Round	L 62–67	19–12	Sprint Center (18,972); Kansas City, MO
*Non-conference game. ^{#}Rankings from AP Poll. (#) Tournament seedings in parentheses. All times are in Central Time.

=== West Virginia ===
West Virginia Mountaineers Schedule

Date time, TV	Rank^{#}	Opponent^{#}	Result	Record	Site (attendance) city, state
Big 12 Regular Season
01/02/2016; 12:00 pm, ESPNU	No. 19	at Kansas State	W 87–83 ^{2OT}	12–1 (1–0)	Bramlage Coliseum (12,270); Manhattan, KS
01/04/2016; 7:00 pm, ESPN2	No. 17	at TCU	W 95–87	13–1 (2–0)	Schollmaier Arena (4,239); Fort Worth, TX
01/09/2016; 1:00 pm, ESPNU	No. 17	Oklahoma State	W 77–60	14–1 (3–0)	WVU Coliseum (11,219); Morgantown, WV
01/12/2016; 7:00 pm, ESPN2	No. 11	No. 1 Kansas	W 74–63	15–1 (4–0)	WVU Coliseum (12,097); Morgantown, WV
01/16/2016; 4:00 pm, ESPN2	No. 11	at No. 2 Oklahoma	L 68–70	15–2 (4–1)	Lloyd Noble Center (11,933); Norman, OK
01/20/2016; 7:00 pm, ESPNU	No. 6	Texas	L 49–56	15–3 (4–2)	WVU Coliseum (9,881); Morgantown, WV
01/23/2016; 1:00 pm, ESPNews	No. 6	at Texas Tech	W 80–76	16–3 (5–2)	United Supermarkets Arena (10,732); Lubbock, TX
01/26/2016; 7:00 pm, ESPNews	No. 9	Kansas State	W 70–55	17–3 (6–2)	WVU Coliseum (9,936); Morgantown, WV
01/30/2016*; 12:00 pm, ESPN	No. 9	at Florida; Big 12/SEC Challenge	L 71–88	17–4	O'Connell Center (11,611); Gainesville, FL
02/02/2016; 9:00 pm, ESPN2	No. 14	at No. 13 Iowa State	W 81–76	18–4 (7–2)	Hilton Coliseum (14,384); Ames, IA
02/06/2016; 8:00 pm, ESPN2	No. 14	No. 15 Baylor	W 80–69	19–4 (8–2)	WVU Coliseum (14,069); Morgantown, WV
02/09/2016; 7:00 pm, ESPN2	No. 10	at No. 6 Kansas	L 65–75	19–5 (8–3)	Allen Fieldhouse (16,300); Lawrence, KS
02/13/2016; 12:00 pm, ESPNU	No. 10	TCU	W 73–42	20–5 (9–3)	WVU Coliseum (13,137); Morgantown, WV
02/16/2016; 7:00 pm, ESPN2	No. 10	at No. 24 Texas	L 78–85	20–6 (9–4)	Frank Erwin Center (12,284); Austin, TX
02/20/2016; 4:00 pm, ESPN	No. 10	No. 3 Oklahoma	L 62–76	20–7 (9–5)	WVU Coliseum (15,289); Morgantown, WV
02/22/2016; 9:00 pm, ESPN	No. 14	No. 17 Iowa State	W 97–87	21–7 (10–5)	WVU Coliseum (10,683); Morgantown, WV
02/27/2016; 6:00 pm, ESPNU	No. 14	at Oklahoma State	W 70–56	22–7 (11–5)	Gallagher-Iba Arena (5,539); Stillwater, OK
03/02/2016; 7:00 pm, ESPNU	No. 10	Texas Tech	W 90–68	23–7 (12–5)	WVU Coliseum (12,680); Morgantown, WV
03/05/2016; 2:00 pm, ESPN	No. 10	at No. 19 Baylor	W 69–58	24–7 (13–5)	Ferrell Center (7,629); Austin, TX
Big 12 tournament
03/10/2016; 7:00 pm, ESPNU	No. 9	vs. (10) TCU; Big 12 Tournament quarterfinals	W 86–66	25–7	Sprint Center (18,972); Kansas City, MO
03/11/2016; 9:00 pm, ESPN2	No. 9	vs. No. 6 (3) Oklahoma; Big 12 Tournament semifinals	W 69–67	26–7	Sprint Center (18,972); Kansas City, MO
03/12/2016; 6:00 pm, ESPN	No. 9	vs. No. 1 (1) Kansas; Big 12 tournament championship	L 71–81	26–8	Sprint Center (19,046); Kansas City, MO
*Non-conference game. ^{#}Rankings from AP Poll. (#) Tournament seedings in parentheses. All times are in Eastern Time.

== Honors and awards ==
=== All-Big 12 awards and teams ===
2016 Big 12 Men's Basketball Individual Awards
Award	Recipient(s)
Player of the Year	Buddy Hield, G, Oklahoma
Coach of the Year	Tubby Smith, Texas Tech
Defensive Player of the Year	Prince Ibeh, C, Texas
Sixth Man Award	Jaysean Paige†, G, West Virginia
Newcomer of the Year	Deonte Burton†, G, Iowa State
Freshman of the Year	Jawun Evans, G, Oklahoma State

2016 Big 12 Men's Basketball All-Conference Teams
First Team	Second Team	Third Team	Defensive Team
Isaiah Taylor, Jr., G, Texas; Buddy Hield†, Sr., G, Oklahoma; Georges Niang†, Sr., F, Iowa State; Taurean Prince, Sr., F, Baylor; Perry Ellis†, Sr., F, Kansas	Jaysean Paige, Sr., G, West Virginia; Monte Morris, Jr., G, Iowa State; Frank Mason III, Jr., G, Kansas; Wayne Selden, Jr., Jr., G, Kansas; Devin Williams, Jr., F, West Virginia	Isaiah Cousins, Sr., G, Oklahoma; Wesley Iwundu, Jr., F, Kansas State; Rico Gathers, Sr., F, Baylor; Johnathan Motley, So., F, Baylor; Ryan Spangler, Sr., F, Oklahoma	Devonte' Graham, So., G, Kansas; Frank Mason III, Jr., G, Kansas; Jevon Carter, So., G, West Virginia; Wesley Iwundu, Jr., F, Kansas State; Khadeem Lattin, So., F, Oklahoma; Prince Ibeh†, Sr., C, Texas
† - denotes unanimous selection

=== Phillips 66 Player of the Week ===
Week	Player of the Week	School	Newcomer of the Week	School	Ref.
Nov. 9–15	Rico Gathers	Baylor	Vladimir Brodziansky	TCU	
Nov. 9–15	Wesley Iwundu	Kansas State	Vladimir Brodziansky	TCU	
Nov. 16–22	Buddy Hield	Oklahoma	Chris Olivier	Oklahoma State	
Nov. 23–29	Monte Morris	Iowa State	Eric Davis Jr.	Texas	
Nov. 23–29	Wayne Selden Jr.	Kansas	Eric Davis Jr.	Texas	
Nov. 30 – Dec.6	Taurean Prince	Baylor	Dean Wade	Kansas State	
Dec. 7–13	Jameel McKay	Iowa State	Eric Davis Jr. (2)	Texas	
Dec. 7–13	Javan Felix	Texas	Eric Davis Jr. (2)	Texas	
Dec. 14–20	Cameron Ridley	Texas	Jawun Evans	Oklahoma State	
Dec. 21–27	Buddy Hield (2)	Oklahoma	Deonte Burton	Iowa State	
Dec. 28 – Jan. 3	Jaysean Paige	West Virginia	Deonte Burton (2)	Iowa State	
Jan. 4–10	Buddy Hield (3)	Oklahoma	Barry Brown	Kansas State	
Jan. 11–17	Isaiah Taylor	Texas	Jawun Evans (2)	Oklahoma State	
Jan. 18–24	Monte Morris (2)	Iowa State	Jawun Evans (3)	Oklahoma State	
Jan. 25–31	Buddy Hield (4)	Oklahoma	Kerwin Roach Jr.	Texas	
Feb. 1–7	Jaysean Paige (2)	West Virginia	Dean Wade (2)	Kansas State	
Feb. 8–14	Devonte' Graham	Kansas	Deonte Burton (3)	Iowa State	
Feb. 15–21	Johnathan Motley	Baylor	Deonte Burton (4)	Iowa State	
Feb. 22–28	Jaysean Paige (3)	West Virginia	Malique Trent	TCU	
Feb. 29 – Mar. 6	Perry Ellis	Kansas	Kerwin Roach Jr. (2)	Texas	

== Postseason ==
=== Big 12 tournament ===
- March 9–12, 2016–Big 12 Conference Basketball Tournament, Sprint Center, Kansas City, MO.

2016 Big 12 men's basketball tournament seeds and results
Seed	School	Conf.	Over.	Tiebreaker	First Round March 9	Quarterfinals March 10	Semifinals March 11	Championship March 12
1.	‡† Kansas	15–3	30–4		Bye	#8 Kansas State	#5 Baylor	#2 West Virginia
2.	† West Virginia	13–5	26–8		Bye	#10 TCU	#3 Oklahoma	#1 Kansas
3.	† Oklahoma	12–6	25–7		Bye	#6 Iowa State	#2 West Virginia	
4.	† Texas	11–7	20–12		Bye	#5 Baylor		
5.	† Baylor	10–8	22–11	2–0 vs ISU	Bye	#4 Texas	#1 Kansas	
6.	† Iowa State	10–8	21–11	0–2 vs BU	Bye	#3 Oklahoma		
7.	Texas Tech	9–9	19–12		#10 TCU			
8.	Kansas State	5–13	17–16		#9 Oklahoma State	#1 Kansas		
9.	Oklahoma State	3–15	12–20		#8 Kansas State			
10.	TCU	2–16	12–21		#7 Texas Tech	#2 West Virginia		
‡ – Big 12 regular season champions, and tournament No. 1 seed. † – Received a single-bye in the conference tournament. Overall records include all games played in the Big 12 tournament.

==== Bracket ====
First round Wednesday, March 9
8	Kansas State	75
9	Oklahoma State	71
7	Texas Tech	62
10	TCU	67

Quarterfinals; Thursday, March 10
1	Kansas	85
8	Kansas State	63
4	Texas	61
5	Baylor	75
2	West Virginia	86
10	TCU	66
3	Oklahoma	79
6	Iowa State	76

Semifinals; Friday, March 11
1	Kansas	70
5	Baylor	66
2	West Virginia	69
3	Oklahoma	67

Championship; Saturday, March 12
1	Kansas	81
2	West Virginia	71

=== NCAA tournament ===
Seed	Region	School	First Round	Second Round	Sweet 16	Elite Eight	Final Four
1	South	Kansas	#16 Austin Peay - March 17, Des Moines - W, 105–79	#9 Connecticut - March 19, Des Moines - W, 73–61	#5 Maryland - March 24, Louisville - W, 79–63	#2 Villanova - March 26, Louisville - L, 59–64	
2	West	Oklahoma	#15 Cal State Bakersfield - March 18, Oklahoma City - W, 82–68	#10 VCU - March 20, Oklahoma City - W, 85–81	#3 Texas A&M - March 24, Anaheim - W, 77–63	#1 Oregon - March 26, Anaheim - W, 80–68	#2 Villanova - April 2, Houston - L, 51–95
3	East	West Virginia	#14 Stephen F. Austin - March 18, Brooklyn - L, 56–70				
4	Midwest	Iowa State	#13 Iona - March 17, Denver - W, 94–81	#12 Little Rock - March 19, Denver - W, 78–61	#1 Virginia - March 25, Chicago - L, 71–84		
5	West	Baylor	#12 Yale - March 17, Providence - L, 75–79				
6	West	Texas	#11 Northern Iowa - March 18, Oklahoma City - L, 72–75				
8	Midwest	Texas Tech	#9 Butler - March 17, Raleigh - L, 61–71				
	7 Bids	W-L (%):	3–4 .429	3–0 1.000	2–1 .667	1–1 .500	TOTAL: 9–7 .563

== See also ==
- 2015–16 NCAA Division I men's basketball season
- Big 12 Conference
- Big 12/SEC Challenge
