= 2015–16 Oklahoma State Cowboys basketball team =

American college basketball season

2015–16 Oklahoma State Cowboys basketball
- Conference: Big 12 Conference
- Record: 12–20 (3–15 Big 12)
- Head coach: Travis Ford (8th season)
- Assistant coaches: James Dickey; Butch Pierre; Bill Grier
- Home arena: Gallagher-Iba Arena

2015–16 Big 12 men's basketball standings
	Conf.				Overall
Team	W		L	PCT	W		L	PCT
No. 1 Kansas †	15	–	3	.833	33	–	5	.868
No. 8 West Virginia	13	–	5	.722	26	–	9	.743
No. 7 Oklahoma	12	–	6	.667	29	–	8	.784
Texas	11	–	7	.611	20	–	13	.606
No. 21 Baylor	10	–	8	.556	22	–	12	.647
No. 22 Iowa State	10	–	8	.556	23	–	12	.657
Texas Tech	9	–	9	.500	19	–	13	.594
Kansas State	5	–	13	.278	17	–	16	.515
Oklahoma State	3	–	15	.167	12	–	20	.375
TCU	2	–	16	.111	12	–	21	.364
† 2016 Big 12 Tournament winner Rankings from AP poll

The 2015–16 Oklahoma State Cowboys basketball team represented Oklahoma State University in the 2015–16 NCAA Division I men's basketball season. This was head coach Travis Ford's eighth and final season at Oklahoma State. The Cowboys were members of the Big 12 Conference and played their home games at Gallagher-Iba Arena. They finished the season 12–20, 3–15 in Big 12 play to finish in ninth place. They lost in the first round of the Big 12 tournament to Kansas State.

On March 18, Oklahoma State and Travis Ford mutually parted ways. He finished at OSU with an eight-year record of 155–111.

== Previous season ==
The Cowboys finished the season 18–14, 8–10 in Big 12 play to finish in a three-way tie for sixth place. They lost in the quarterfinals of the Big 12 tournament to Oklahoma. They received an at-large bid to the NCAA tournament where they lost in second round to Oregon.

== Departures ==
Name	Number	Pos.	Height	Weight	Year	Hometown	Notes
Le'Bryan Nash	2	G/F	6'7"	235	Senior	Dallas, TX	Graduated
Anthony Hickey	12	G	5'11"	185	Senior	Hopkinsville, KY	Graduated
Marek Souček	14	F/C	7'0"	240	Senior	Brno, Czech Republic	Graduated
Christien Sager	15	G/F	6'4"	205	Senior	Wichita Falls, TX	Graduated
Michael Cobbins	20	F	6'8"	230	RS Senior	Amarillo, TX	Graduated
Alex Budke	24	G	6'2"	190	Senior	Stillwater, OK	Graduated

=== Incoming transfers ===
Name	Number	Pos.	Height	Weight	Year	Hometown	Notes
Igor Ibaka	14	F	6'9"	220	Sophomore	Republic of the Congo	Junior college transferred from Northeastern Oklahoma A&M College
Chris Olivier	31	F	6'8"	245	RS Senior	Chicago, IL	Transferred from Eastern Illinois. Will be eligible to play immediately since Olivier graduated from Eastern Illinois.

== Recruits ==
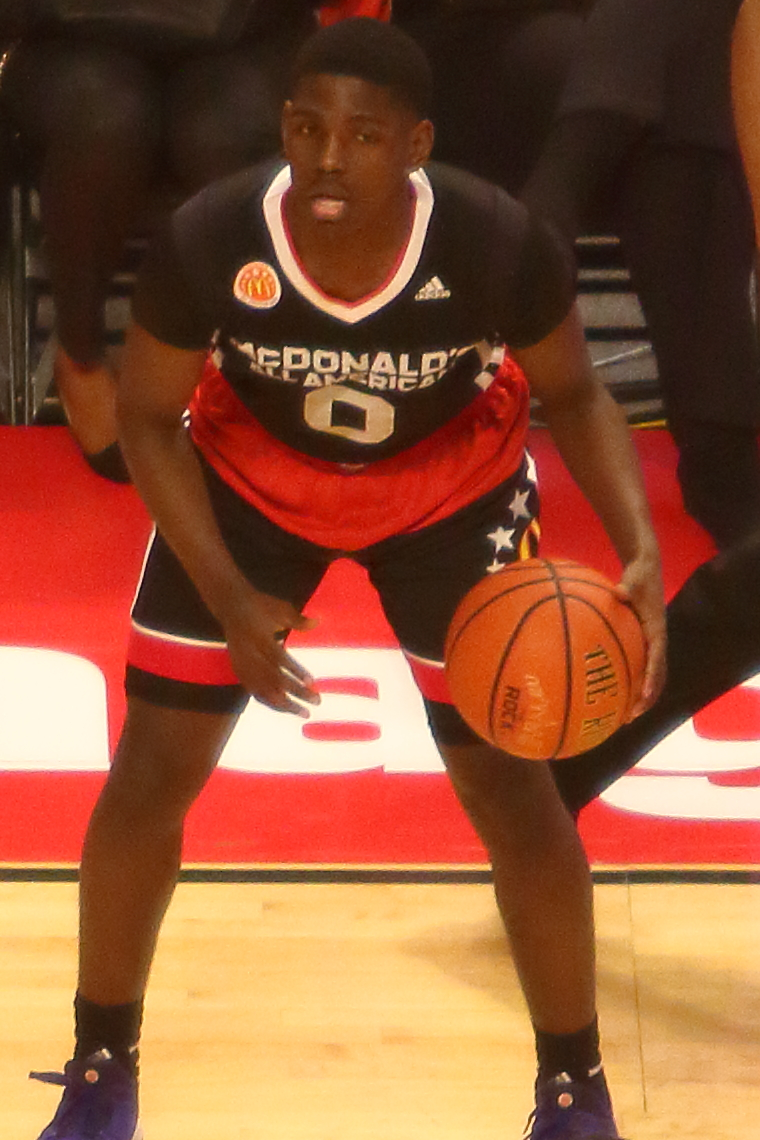
Jawun Evans at the 2015 McDonald's All-American Boys Game

College recruiting
Name	Hometown	School	Height	Weight	Commit date
Jawun Evans; PG	Dallas, TX	Justin F. Kimball High School	6 ft 0 in (1.83 m)	180 lb (82 kg)	Oct 1, 2014
Jawun Evans; PG	Recruit ratings: Scout: Rivals: 247Sports: ESPN:				
Davon Dillard; SF	Gary, IN	Our Savior New American School	6 ft 6 in (1.98 m)	205 lb (93 kg)	Oct 1, 2014
Davon Dillard; SF	Recruit ratings: Scout: Rivals: 247Sports: ESPN:				
Overall recruit ranking:
Note: In many cases, Scout, Rivals, 247Sports, On3, and ESPN may conflict in their listings of height and weight.; In these cases, the average was taken. ESPN grades are on a 100-point scale.; Sources: "2015 Team Ranking". Rivals.

=== Recruiting Class of 2016 ===
College recruiting (2016)
Name	Hometown	School	Height	Weight	Commit date
Tre Evans; PG	Oklahoma City, OK	Putnam City West High School	6 ft 1 in (1.85 m)	165 lb (75 kg)	Oct 21, 2014
Tre Evans; PG	Recruit ratings: Scout: Rivals: 247Sports: ESPN:				
Overall recruit ranking:
Note: In many cases, Scout, Rivals, 247Sports, On3, and ESPN may conflict in their listings of height and weight.; In these cases, the average was taken. ESPN grades are on a 100-point scale.; Sources: "2016 Team Ranking". Rivals.

== Roster ==
2015–16 Oklahoma State Cowboys men's basketball team
Players
Coaches

Pos.	#	Name	Height	Weight	Year	Previous school	Hometown
G	0	Ford Stuen	6 ft 3 in (1.91 m)	190 lb (86 kg)	Sr	Henderson County; IMG Academy (Fla.)	Henderson, KY
G	1	Jawun Evans	6 ft 0 in (1.83 m)	180 lb (82 kg)	Fr	Kimball	Dallas, TX
G	2	Tyree Griffin	5 ft 10 in (1.78 m)	165 lb (75 kg)	So	O. Perry Walker	New Orleans, LA
G/F	4	Joe Burton	6 ft 6 in (1.98 m)	215 lb (98 kg)	So	Atascocita	Houston, TX
F	5	Tavarius Shine	6 ft 5 in (1.96 m)	195 lb (88 kg)	So	MacArthur; FUMA	Irving, TX
G	13	Phil Forte III	5 ft 11 in (1.8 m)	185 lb (84 kg)	Sr	Marcus	Flower Mound, TX
F	14	Igor Ibaka	6 ft 9 in (2.06 m)	220 lb (100 kg)	So	Jariat de Manresa; Northeastern Oklahoma	Republic of the Congo
F	21	Codey McElroy (W)	6 ft 6 in (1.98 m)	225 lb (102 kg)	Sr	Chattanooga (Texas/Cameron)	Chattanooga, OK
G	22	Jeff Newberry	6 ft 2 in (1.88 m)	190 lb (86 kg)	RS Sr	Westlake; NMJC	Atlanta, GA
G/F	23	Leyton Hammonds	6 ft 7 in (2.01 m)	205 lb (93 kg)	Jr	Richland	North Richland Hills, TX
G/F	24	Davon Dillard	6 ft 5 in (1.96 m)	205 lb (93 kg)	Fr	Our Savior New American School	Gary, IN
G/F	30	Jeffrey Carroll	6 ft 6 in (1.98 m)	205 lb (93 kg)	RS So	Rowlett	Rowlett, TX
F	31	Chris Olivier	6 ft 8 in (2.03 m)	245 lb (111 kg)	RS Sr	Quakerdale Prep; Eastern Illinois	Chicago, IL
C	32	Anthony Allen	7 ft 0 in (2.13 m)	240 lb (109 kg)	RS Sr	Bassick; Lamar State Port Arthur	Kingston, Jamaica
C	41	Mitchell Solomon	6 ft 9 in (2.06 m)	235 lb (107 kg)	So	Bixby	Bixby, OK

Head coach

- Travis Ford (Kentucky)

Assistant coach(es)

- Butch Pierre (Mississippi State)
- James Dickey (Central Arkansas)
- Bill Grier (Oregon)

Legend

- (C) Team captain
- (S) Suspended
- (I) Ineligible
- (W) Walk-on
- Injured
- Current redshirt

Roster

== Schedule and results ==
Date time, TV	Rank^{#}	Opponent^{#}	Result	Record	Site (attendance) city, state
Exhibition
11/06/2015*; 7:00 pm, FSOK+		East Central Oklahoma	W 94–66		Gallagher-Iba Arena (3,198); Stillwater, OK
Regular season
11/13/2015*; 7:00 pm, FSOK+		Tennessee–Martin	W 91–57	1–0	Gallagher-Iba Arena (4,972); Stillwater, OK
11/16/2015*; 7:00 pm, FSOK+		Arkansas–Pine Bluff	W 86–72	2–0	Gallagher-Iba Arena (4,556); Stillwater, OK
11/19/2015*; 1:30 pm, ESPN3		vs. Towson; Charleston Classic quarterfinals	W 69–52	3–0	TD Arena (1,760); Charleston, SC
11/20/2015*; 12:00 pm, ESPNU		vs. George Mason; Charleston Classic semifinals	L 68–71	3–1	TD Arena (1,220); Charleston, SC
11/22/2015*; 6:00 pm, ESPNU		vs. Long Beach State; Charleston Classic 3rd place game	W 82–77	4–1	TD Arena (2,710); Charleston, SC
11/27/2015*; 7:30 pm, FSOK+		Long Beach State; Charleston Classic	W 79–73	5–1	Gallagher-Iba Arena (5,192); Stillwater, OK
12/02/2015*; 7:00 pm, FSOK		Tulsa	L 56–66	5–2	Gallagher-Iba Arena (5,422); Stillwater, OK
12/05/2015*; 2:30 pm, FSOK		Missouri State	L 63–64	5–3	Gallagher-Iba Arena (4,651); Stillwater, OK
12/12/2015*; 7:30 pm, BTN		vs. Minnesota; Sioux Falls Showcase	W 62–60	6–3	Sanford Pentagon (3,250); Sioux Falls, SD
12/15/2015*; 7:00 pm, ESPNU		Longwood	W 73–55	7–3	Gallagher-Iba Arena (4,323); Stillwater, OK
12/19/2015*; 7:00 pm, FS1		vs. Florida; Orange Bowl Basketball Classic	L 70–72	7–4	BB&T Center (9,483); Sunrise, FL
12/29/2015*; 7:00 pm, FSOK+		UMKC	W 61–43	8–4	Gallagher-Iba Arena (5,150); Stillwater, OK
01/02/2016; 3:00 pm, ESPNews		TCU	W 69–48	9–4 (1–0)	Gallagher-Iba Arena (5,191); Stillwater, OK
01/05/2016; 7:00 pm, ESPNU		at Baylor	L 62–79	9–5 (1–1)	Ferrell Center (5,665); Waco, TX
01/09/2016; 12:00 pm, ESPNU		at No. 17 West Virginia	L 60–77	9–6 (1–2)	WVU Coliseum (11,219); Morgantown, WV
01/13/2016; 8:00 pm, ESPNU		No. 2 Oklahoma; Bedlam Series	L 72–74	9–7 (1–3)	Gallagher-Iba Arena (9,380); Stillwater, OK
01/16/2016; 5:00 pm, ESPN2		at Texas	L 69–74	9–8 (1–4)	Frank Erwin Center (13,241); Austin, TX
01/19/2016; 6:00 pm, ESPN2		No. 3 Kansas	W 86–67	10–8 (2–4)	Gallagher-Iba Arena (11,383); Stillwater, OK
01/23/2016; 5:00 pm, ESPNU		at Kansas State	L 73–89	10–9 (2–5)	Bramlage Coliseum (12,298); Manhattan, KS
01/27/2016; 8:00 pm, ESPNU		No. 17 Baylor	L 65–69	10–10 (2–6)	Gallagher-Iba Arena (7,148); Stillwater, OK
01/30/2016*; 7:00 pm, ESPN2		at Auburn; Big 12/SEC Challenge	W 74–63	11–10	Auburn Arena (8,867); Auburn, AL
02/03/2016; 8:00 pm, ESPNews		at Texas Tech	L 61–63 ^{OT}	11–11 (2–7)	United Supermarkets Arena (10,032); Lubbock, TX
02/06/2016; 1:00 pm, ESPN2		No. 13 Iowa State	L 59–64	11–12 (2–8)	Gallagher-Iba Arena (6,561); Stillwater, OK
02/08/2016; 6:00 pm, ESPNU		at TCU	L 56–63	11–13 (2–9)	Schollmaier Arena (4,957); Fort Worth, TX
02/13/2016; 12:00 pm, ESPNews		Kansas State	W 58–55 ^{OT}	12–13 (3–9)	Gallagher-Iba Arena (4,407); Stillwater, OK
02/15/2016; 8:00 pm, ESPN		at No. 2 Kansas	L 67–94	12–14 (3–10)	Allen Fieldhouse (16,300); Lawrence, KS
02/20/2016; 8:30 pm, ESPNU		Texas Tech	L 61–71	12–15 (3–11)	Gallagher-Iba Arena (4,679); Stillwater, OK
02/24/2016; 8:00 pm, ESPNU		at No. 3 Oklahoma; Bedlam Series	L 49–71	12–16 (3–12)	Lloyd Noble Center (11,470); Norman, OK
02/27/2016; 5:00 pm, ESPNU		No. 14 West Virginia	L 56–70	12–17 (3–13)	Gallagher-Iba Arena (5,539); Stillwater, OK
02/29/2016; 6:00 pm, ESPNU		at No. 21 Iowa State	L 50–58	12–18 (3–14)	Hilton Coliseum (14,348); Ames, IA
03/04/2016; 8:00 pm, ESPN2		No. 23 Texas	L 50–62	12–19 (3–15)	Gallagher-Iba Arena (4,023); Stillwater, OK
Big 12 tournament
03/09/2016; 6:00 pm, ESPNU	(9)	vs. (8) Kansas State; First round	L 71–75	12–20	Sprint Center (18,972); Kansas City, MO
*Non-conference game. ^{#}Rankings from AP Poll. (#) Tournament seedings in parentheses. All times are in Central Time.

CSN = Cowboy Sports Network. The Cowboy Sports Network is affiliated with Fox Sports Net. Games could air on Fox Sports Oklahoma, Fox Sports Oklahoma Plus, Fox Sports Southwest, Fox Sports Southwest Plus, or Fox College Sports.
