= 2015–16 Kansas State Wildcats men's basketball team =

American college basketball season

2015–16 Kansas State Wildcats men's basketball
- Conference: Big 12 Conference
- Record: 17–16 (5–13 Big 12)
- Head coach: Bruce Weber (4th season)
- Assistant coaches: Chris Lowery; Alvin Brooks III; Chester Frazier
- Home arena: Bramlage Coliseum (12,528)

2015–16 Big 12 men's basketball standings
	Conf.				Overall
Team	W		L	PCT	W		L	PCT
No. 1 Kansas †	15	–	3	.833	33	–	5	.868
No. 8 West Virginia	13	–	5	.722	26	–	9	.743
No. 7 Oklahoma	12	–	6	.667	29	–	8	.784
Texas	11	–	7	.611	20	–	13	.606
No. 21 Baylor	10	–	8	.556	22	–	12	.647
No. 22 Iowa State	10	–	8	.556	23	–	12	.657
Texas Tech	9	–	9	.500	19	–	13	.594
Kansas State	5	–	13	.278	17	–	16	.515
Oklahoma State	3	–	15	.167	12	–	20	.375
TCU	2	–	16	.111	12	–	21	.364
† 2016 Big 12 Tournament winner Rankings from AP poll

The 2015–16 Kansas State Wildcats men's basketball team represented Kansas State University in the 2015–16 NCAA Division I men's basketball season. Their head coach was Bruce Weber in his fourth year at the helm of the Wildcats. The team played its home games in Bramlage Coliseum in Manhattan, its home court since 1988. They were a member of the Big 12 Conference. They finished the season 17–16, 5–13 in Big 12 play to finish in eighth place. They defeated Oklahoma State in the first round of the Big 12 tournament to advance to the quarterfinals where they lost to Kansas.

== Preseason ==
The Wildcats finished the previous season 15–17 record 8–10 in Big 12 Play to finish in a tie for eighth place. They lost in the first round of the Big 12 tournament to TCU.

== Departures ==
Name	Number	Pos.	Height	Weight	Year	Hometown	Notes
Jevon Thomas	1	G	6'0"	180	Sophomore	Queens, NY	Transferred to Seton Hall
Marcus Foster	2	G	6'2"	200	Sophomore	Wichita Falls, TX	Transferred to Creighton
Jack Karapetyan	3	F	6'7"	220	RS Freshman	Los Angeles, CA	Transferred
Tre Harris	5	G	6'5"	195	Freshman	Edwardsville, IL	Transferred to SIU Edwardsville
Malek Harris	10	F	6'7"	200	Freshman	Orland Park, IL	Dismissed from team for violation of team rules
Nino Williams	11	F	6'5"	220	RS Senior	St. Louis, MO	Graduated
Nigel Johnson	23	G	6'1"	180	Sophomore	Ashburn, VA	Transferred to Rutgers
Evan Beucler	32	G	6'5"	180	Freshman	Dallas, TX	Walk-on; transferred to Tyler Junior College
Shawn Meyer	40	G	6'3"	215	Senior	Kansas City, MO	Graduated
Thomas Gipson	42	F	6'7"	265	Senior	Cedar Hill, TX	Graduated

=== Incoming transfers ===
Name	Number	Pos.	Height	Weight	Year	Hometown	Notes
Corlbe Ervin	1	G	6'3"	190	Junior	Oklahoma City, OK	Junior college transferred from Connors State College

== Class of 2015 recruits ==
College recruiting information
Name	Hometown	School	Height	Weight	Commit date
Dante Hales; C	Dallas, TX	Woodrow Wilson High School	6 ft 10 in (2.08 m)	215 lb (98 kg)	Sep 13, 2014
Dante Hales; C	Recruit ratings: Scout: Rivals: 247Sports: ESPN:				
Kamau Stokes; PG	Baltimore, MD	Fork Union Military Academy	5 ft 11 in (1.80 m)	175 lb (79 kg)	Mar 1, 2015
Kamau Stokes; PG	Recruit ratings: Scout: Rivals: 247Sports: ESPN:				
Barry Brown Jr. SG	Saint Petersburg, FL	Gibbs High School	6 ft 2 in (1.88 m)	180 lb (82 kg)	Aug 27, 2014
Barry Brown Jr. SG	Recruit ratings: Scout: Rivals: 247Sports: ESPN:				
Isaiah Maurice; PF	Durham, NC	Bull City Prep	6 ft 9 in (2.06 m)	210 lb (95 kg)	Apr 19, 2015
Isaiah Maurice; PF	Recruit ratings: Scout: Rivals: 247Sports: ESPN:				
Dean Wade; PF	Saint John, KS	Saint John High School	6 ft 8 in (2.03 m)	215 lb (98 kg)	Aug 31, 2014
Dean Wade; PF	Recruit ratings: Scout: Rivals: 247Sports: ESPN:				
Dante Williams; C	Grand Prairie, TX	Bowie High School	7 ft 0 in (2.13 m)	220 lb (100 kg)	Sep 13, 2014
Dante Williams; C	Recruit ratings: Scout: Rivals: 247Sports: ESPN:				
Ron Freeman; SF	Inglewood, CA	Future College Prep	6 ft 5 in (1.96 m)	180 lb (82 kg)	Jun 23, 2015
Ron Freeman; SF	Recruit ratings: Scout: Rivals: 247Sports: ESPN:				
Overall recruit ranking: Scout: Not Ranked Top 20 Rivals: Not Ranked Top 25 ESPN: Not Ranked Top 25
Note: In many cases, Scout, Rivals, 247Sports, On3, and ESPN may conflict in their listings of height and weight.; In these cases, the average was taken. ESPN grades are on a 100-point scale.; Sources: "2015 Kansas State Basketball Commits". Rivals.; "2015 Kansas State Basketball Commits". Scout.; "2015 Kansas State Basketball Commits". ESPN.; "Scout.com Team Recruiting Rankings". Scout.; "2015 Team Ranking". Rivals.

== Roster ==
2015–16 Kansas State Wildcats men's basketball team
Players
Coaches

Pos.	#	Name	Height	Weight	Year	Hometown
G	1	Carlbe Ervin II	6 ft 3 in (1.91 m)	205 lb (93 kg)	Jr	Oklahoma City, OK
G	3	Kamau Stokes	6 ft 0 in (1.83 m)	170 lb (77 kg)	Fr	Baltimore, MD
F	4	D. J. Johnson	6 ft 9 in (2.06 m)	250 lb (113 kg)	RS Jr	St. Louis, MO
G	5	Barry Brown Jr.	6 ft 3 in (1.91 m)	195 lb (88 kg)	Fr	St. Petersburg, FL
F	11	Isaiah Maurice	6 ft 10 in (2.08 m)	225 lb (102 kg)	Fr	Durham, NC
G	12	Mason Schoen (W)	6 ft 2 in (1.88 m)	185 lb (84 kg)	RS So	Overland Park, KS
G	13	Zach Winter (W)	6 ft 3 in (1.91 m)	210 lb (95 kg)	Jr	Andover, KS
G	14	Justin Edwards	6 ft 4 in (1.93 m)	200 lb (91 kg)	RS Sr	Whitby, ON
F	15	Dante Williams	7 ft 0 in (2.13 m)	255 lb (116 kg)	Fr	Arlington, TX
C	21	Brandon Bolden	6 ft 11 in (2.11 m)	215 lb (98 kg)	RS Jr	Sumter, SC
G	23	Ron Freeman	6 ft 5 in (1.96 m)	185 lb (84 kg)	Fr	Los Angeles, CA
F	24	Pierson McAtee (W)	6 ft 6 in (1.98 m)	190 lb (86 kg)	Fr	Manhattan, KS
F	25	Wesley Iwundu	6 ft 7 in (2.01 m)	210 lb (95 kg)	Jr	Houston, TX
F	32	Dean Wade	6 ft 10 in (2.08 m)	225 lb (102 kg)	Fr	St. John, KS
G	33	Brian Rohleder	6 ft 3 in (1.91 m)	215 lb (98 kg)	RS Sr	Wichita, KS
G	35	Austin Budke (W)	6 ft 6 in (1.98 m)	220 lb (100 kg)	Jr	Beloit, KS
F	41	Stephen Hurt	6 ft 11 in (2.11 m)	265 lb (120 kg)	Sr	Murfreesboro, TN

Head coach

- Bruce Weber (Wisconsin–Milwaukee)

Assistant coach(es)

- Chris Lowery (Southern Illinois)
- Alvin Brooks III (Idaho State)
- Chester Frazier (Illinois)

Legend

- (C) Team captain
- (S) Suspended
- (I) Ineligible
- (W) Walk-on
- Injured
- Current redshirt

Roster

== Schedule ==
Date time, TV	Rank^{#}	Opponent^{#}	Result	Record	High points	High rebounds	High assists	Site (attendance) city, state
Exhibition
10/30/2015*; 7:00 pm, FSKC		Emporia State	W 80–42		17 – Iwundu	7 – Tied	6 – Iwundu	Bramlage Coliseum (11,327); Manhattan, KS
11/06/2015*; 7:00 pm		Fort Hays State	W 70–52		17 – Iwundu	7 – Hurt	4 – Tied	Bramlage Coliseum (11,544); Manhattan, KS
Regular season
11/13/2015*; 7:00 pm, FSKC		Maryland Eastern Shore; CBE Hall of Fame Classic	W 80–53	1–0	23 – Iwundu	10 – Iwundu	4 – Iwundu	Bramlage Coliseum (11,389); Manhattan, KS
11/16/2015*; 8:00 pm		Columbia; CBE Hall of Fame Classic	W 81–71	2–0	19 – Edwards	6 – 3 tied	7 – Edwards	Bramlage Coliseum (11,368); Manhattan, KS
11/20/2015*; 7:00 pm, FSKC		South Dakota	W 93–72	3–0	18 – Brown	8 – Tied	5 – Stokes	Bramlage Coliseum (12,257); Manhattan, KS
11/23/2015*; 6:00 pm, ESPNU		vs. Missouri; CBE Hall of Fame Classic semifinals	W 66–42	4–0	14 – Wade	13 – Wade	4 – Iwundu	Sprint Center (13,598); Kansas City, MO
11/24/2015*; 9:00 pm, ESPN2		vs. No. 9 North Carolina; CBE Hall of Fame Classic championship	L 70–80	4–1	24 – Stokes	7 – Edwards	4 – Edwards	Sprint Center (13,198); Kansas City, MO
11/29/2015*; 2:00 pm, FSKC		South Carolina State	W 68–66	5–1	18 – Edwards	10 – Hurt	6 – Edwards	Bramlage Coliseum (11,781); Manhattan, KS
12/04/2015*; 6:00 pm, SECN		at Georgia	W 68–66	6–1	17 – Wade	8 – Edwards	3 – Edwards	Stegeman Coliseum (6,949); Athens, GA
12/09/2015*; 7:00 pm, FSKC		Coppin State	W 83–58	7–1	14 – Tied	7 – Tied	5 – Tied	Bramlage Coliseum (11,409); Manhattan, KS
12/12/2015*; 4:30 pm, SECN		at Texas A&M	L 68–78	7–2	23 – Iwundu	6 – 3 tied	3 – 3 tied	Reed Arena (7,003); College Station, TX
12/19/2015*; 3:00 pm, FSKC		vs. Colorado State; Wichita Wildcat Classic	W 61–56	8–2	13 – Wade	8 – Wade	3 – Stokes	Intrust Bank Arena (9,367); Wichita, KS
12/22/2015*; 7:00 pm, FSKC		North Dakota	W 63–49	9–2	15 – Brown	7 – Tied	5 – Stokes	Bramlage Coliseum (12,440); Manhattan, KS
12/29/2015*; 7:00 pm, FSKC		Saint Louis	W 75–47	10–2	13 – Iwundu	8 – Iwundu	4 – Tied	Bramlage Coliseum (12,528); Manhattan, KS
01/02/2016; 11:00 am, ESPNU		No. 19 West Virginia	L 83–87 ^{2OT}	10–3 (0–1)	20 – Brown	8 – Wade	3 – Tied	Bramlage Coliseum (12,270); Manhattan, KS
01/05/2016; 7:00 pm, LHN		at Texas	L 57–60	10–4 (0–2)	15 – Brown	10 – Edwards	4 – Stokes	Erwin Center (10,620); Austin, TX
01/09/2016; 3:30 pm, ESPNews		at No. 2 Oklahoma	L 76–86	10–5 (0–3)	19 – Brown	8 – Brown	3 – Stokes	Lloyd Noble Center (11,113); Norman, OK
01/12/2016; 7:00 pm, FSKC		Texas Tech	W 83–70	11–5 (1–3)	17 – Tied	8 – Edwards	4 – 3 tied	Bramlage Coliseum (12,361); Manhattan, KS
01/16/2015; 3:00 pm, ESPNU		No. 17 Iowa State	L 63–76	11–6 (1–4)	17 – Edwards	9 – Iwundu	6 – Brown	Bramlage Coliseum (12,462); Manhattan, KS
01/20/2016; 7:15 pm, ESPNews		at No. 19 Baylor	L 72–79 ^{2OT}	11–7 (1–5)	20 – Stokes	10 – Iwundu	7 – Iwundu	Ferrell Center (5,588); Waco, TX
01/23/2016; 5:00 pm, ESPNU		Oklahoma State	W 89–73	12–7 (2–5)	13 – Tied	6 – Johnson	4 – Iwundu	Bramlage Coliseum (12,298); Manhattan, KS
01/26/2016; 6:00 pm, ESPNews		at No. 9 West Virginia	L 55–70	12–8 (2–6)	11 – Edwards	8 – Wade	4 – Iwundu	WVU Coliseum (9,936); Morgantown, WV
01/30/2016*; 1:00 pm, ESPNU		Ole Miss; Big 12/SEC Challenge	W 69–64	13–8 (2–6)	14 – Johnson	7 – Johnson	4 – Ervin	Bramlage Coliseum (12,528); Manhattan, KS
02/03/2016; 8:00 pm, ESPN2		at No. 7 Kansas; Sunflower Showdown	L 59–77	13–9 (2–7)	15 – Iwundu	11 – Hurt	5 – Iwundu	Allen Fieldhouse (16,300); Lawrence, KS
02/06/2016; 5:00 pm, ESPNU		No. 1 Oklahoma	W 80–69	14–9 (3–7)	22 – Iwundu	8 – Johnson	7 – Iwundu	Bramlage Coliseum (12,528); Manhattan, KS
02/10/2016; 7:15 pm, ESPNews		No. 21 Baylor	L 72–82	14–10 (3–8)	19 – Tied	8 – Johnson	9 – Iwundu	Bramlage Coliseum (11,636); Manhattan, KS
02/13/2016; 12:00 pm, ESPNews		at Oklahoma State	L 55–58 ^{OT}	14–11 (3–9)	14 – Edwards	13 – Edwards	7 – Iwundu	Gallagher-Iba Arena (4,407); Stillwater, OK
02/16/2016; 7:00 pm, ESPNews		at TCU	W 63–49	15–11 (4–9)	17 – Edwards	6 – Iwundu	3 – 3 tied	Schollmaier Arena (4,999); Fort Worth, TX
02/20/2016; 5:00 pm, ESPN2		No. 2 Kansas; Sunflower Showdown	L 63–72	15–12 (4–10)	13 – Tied	9 – Hurt	3 – Tied	Bramlage Coliseum (12,528); Manhattan, KS
02/22/2015; 6:00 pm, ESPNU		No. 25 Texas	L 70–71	15–13 (4–11)	20 – Edwards	8 – Edwards	5 – Edwards	Bramlage Coliseum (11,629); Manhattan, KS
02/27/2016; 5:00 pm, ESPN2		at No. 17 Iowa State	L 61–80	15–14 (4–12)	22 – Johnson	9 – Johnson	4 – Iwundu	Hilton Coliseum (14,384); Ames, IA
03/02/2016; 7:00 pm, FSKC		TCU	W 79–54	16–14 (5–12)	15 – Brown	11 – Hurt	7 – Iwundu	Bramlage Coliseum (11,518); Manhattan, KS
03/05/2016; 2:00 pm, ESPNews		at Texas Tech	L 71–80	16–15 (5–13)	21 – Johnson	10 – Johnson	4 – Iwundu	United Supermarkets Arena (12,359); Lubbock, TX
Big 12 tournament
03/09/2016; 6:00 pm, ESPNU	(9)	vs. (8) Oklahoma State; First round	W 75–71	17–15	20 – Wade	9 – Edwards	4 – Tied	Sprint Center (18,972); Kansas City, MO
03/10/2016; 1:30 pm, ESPN2	(9)	vs. (1) No. 1 Kansas; Quarterfinals	L 63–85	17–16	23 – Edwards	10 – Edwards	4 – Iwundu	Sprint Center (18,972); Kansas City, MO
*Non-conference game. ^{#}Rankings from AP Poll. (#) Tournament seedings in parentheses. All times are in Central Time.

== See also ==
2015–16 Kansas State Wildcats women's basketball team
