= 2016 Big 12 men's basketball tournament =

- Classification: Division I
- Season: 2015–16
- Teams: 10
- Site: Sprint Center; Kansas City, Missouri
- Champions: Kansas (10th title)
- Winning coach: Bill Self (7th title)
- MVP: Devonte’ Graham (Kansas)
- Attendance: 94,934 (overall); 19,046 (championship)
- Top scorers: Perry Ellis (Kansas); Devin Williams (West Virginia) (58 points)
- Television: ESPN, ESPN2, ESPNU

2015–16 Big 12 men's basketball standings
	Conf.				Overall
Team	W		L	PCT	W		L	PCT
No. 1 Kansas †	15	–	3	.833	33	–	5	.868
No. 8 West Virginia	13	–	5	.722	26	–	9	.743
No. 7 Oklahoma	12	–	6	.667	29	–	8	.784
Texas	11	–	7	.611	20	–	13	.606
No. 21 Baylor	10	–	8	.556	22	–	12	.647
No. 22 Iowa State	10	–	8	.556	23	–	12	.657
Texas Tech	9	–	9	.500	19	–	13	.594
Kansas State	5	–	13	.278	17	–	16	.515
Oklahoma State	3	–	15	.167	12	–	20	.375
TCU	2	–	16	.111	12	–	21	.364
† 2016 Big 12 Tournament winner Rankings from AP poll

The 2016 Phillips 66 Big 12 men's basketball tournament was a postseason men's basketball tournament for the Big 12 Conference. It was played from March 9 to 12, in Kansas City, Missouri at the Sprint Center. Kansas won the tournament for the 10th time and received the conference's automatic bid to the 2016 NCAA tournament.

== Seeding ==
The Tournament consisted of a 10 team single-elimination tournament with the top 6 seeds receiving a bye. Teams were seeded by record within the conference, with a tiebreaker system to seed teams with identical conference records.

2016 Big 12 Men's Basketball Tournament seeds
Seed	School	Conf.	Over.	Tiebreaker
1	Kansas ‡#	15–3	33–5	
2	West Virginia #	13–5	26–9	
3	Oklahoma #	12–6	29–8	
4	Texas #	11–7	20–13	
5	Baylor #	10–8	22–12	2–0 vs. Iowa State
6	Iowa State #	10–8	23–12	0–2 vs. Baylor
7	Texas Tech	9–9	19–13	
8	Kansas State	5–13	17–16	
9	Oklahoma State	3–15	12–20	
10	TCU	2–16	12–21	
‡ – Big 12 Conference regular season champions, and tournament No. 1 seed. # – Received a single-bye in the conference tournament. Overall records include all games played in the Big 12 Conference tournament.

== Schedule ==
Session	Game	Time	Matchup	Television	Attendance
First Round – Wednesday, March 9
1	1	6:00 pm	#8 Kansas State 75 vs #9 Oklahoma State 71	ESPNU	18,972
1	2	8:00 pm	#10 TCU 67 vs #7 Texas Tech 62	ESPNU	18,972
Quarterfinals – Thursday, March 10
2	3	11:30 am	#5 Baylor 75 vs #4 Texas 61	ESPN2	18,972
2	4	1:30 pm	#1 Kansas 85 vs #8 Kansas State 63	ESPN2	18,972
3	5	6:00 pm	#2 West Virginia 86 vs #10 TCU 66	ESPNU	18,972
3	6	8:00 pm	#3 Oklahoma 79 vs #6 Iowa State 76	ESPNU	18,972
Semifinals – Friday, March 11
4	7	6:00 pm	#1 Kansas 70 vs #5 Baylor 66	ESPN2	18,972
4	8	8:00 pm	#2 West Virginia 69 vs #3 Oklahoma 67	ESPN2	18,972
Final – Saturday, March 12
5	9	5:00 pm	#1 Kansas 81 vs #2 West Virginia 71	ESPN	19,046
Game times in CT. #-Rankings denote tournament seed

== Bracket ==
First round Wednesday, March 9
8	Kansas State	75
9	Oklahoma State	71
7	Texas Tech	62
10	TCU	67

Quarterfinals; Thursday, March 10
1	Kansas	85
8	Kansas State	63
4	Texas	61
5	Baylor	75
2	West Virginia	86
10	TCU	66
3	Oklahoma	79
6	Iowa State	76

Semifinals; Friday, March 11
1	Kansas	70
5	Baylor	66
2	West Virginia	69
3	Oklahoma	67

Championship; Saturday, March 12
1	Kansas	81
2	West Virginia	71

== Game summaries ==
=== First round ===
ESPNU

March 9
6:00 PM

Recap

#8 Kansas State 75, #9 Oklahoma State 71
Scoring by half: 40–23, 35–48
Pts: Dean Wade 20; Rebs: Edwards 9 Asts: Iwundu, Edwards 4	Pts: Carroll, Burton 13; Rebs: Leyton Hammonds 7 Asts: Tyree Griffin 10

Sprint Center, Kansas City, Missouri
Attendance: 18,972
Referees: John Higgins, Don Daily, Keith Kimble

ESPNU

March 9
8:00 PM

Recap

#7 Texas Tech 62, #10 TCU 67
Scoring by half: 31–30, 31–37
Pts: Gray, Smith 13; Rebs: Zach Smith 15; Asts: Devaugntah Williams 5	Pts: Chauncey Collins 19; Rebs: Vladimir Brodziansky 10; Asts: Malique Trent 4

Sprint Center, Kansas City, Missouri
Attendance: 18,972
Referees: Mike Stuart, Gerry Pollard, Bert Smith

=== Quarterfinals ===
ESPN2

March 10
11:30 AM

Recap

#4 Texas 61, #5 Baylor 75
Scoring by half: 27–38, 34–37
Pts: Connor Lammert 15; Rebs: Kerwin Roach 5 Asts: Isaiah Taylor 9	Pts: Taurean Prince 24; Rebs: Taurean Prince 13; Asts: Taurean Prince 4

Sprint Center, Kansas City, Missouri
Attendance: 18,972
Referees: Kipp Kissinger, Joe DeRosa, Doug Sirmons

ESPN2

March 10
1:30 PM

Recap

#1 Kansas 85, #8 Kansas State 63
Scoring by half: 45–30, 40–33
Pts: Perry Ellis 21; Rebs: Perry Ellis 6 Asts: Devonte' Graham 8	Pts: Justin Edwards 23; Rebs: Justin Edwards 10; Asts: Wesley Iwundu 4

Sprint Center, Kansas City, Missouri
Attendance: 18,972
Referees: Mike Stuart, Gerry Pollard, Bert Smith

ESPNU

March 10
6:00 PM

Recap

#2 West Virginia 86, #10 TCU 66
Scoring by half: 47–36, 39–30
Pts: Devin Williams 18; Rebs: Devin Williams 13; Asts: Three tied 3	Pts: Chauncey Collins 18; Rebs: JD Miller 8 Asts: Malique Trent 4

Sprint Center, Kansas City, Missouri
Attendance: 18,972
Referees: Paul Janssen, Keith Kimble, Mark Whitehead

ESPNU

March 10
8:00 PM

Recap

#3 Oklahoma 79, #6 Iowa State 76
Scoring by half: 35–29, 44–47
Pts: Buddy Hield 39; Rebs: Ryan Spangler 12; Asts: Isaiah Cousins 5	Pts: Georges Niang 31; Rebs: McKay, Burton 9 Asts: Georges Niang 5

Sprint Center, Kansas City, Missouri
Attendance: 18,972
Referees: Tom Eades, John Higgens, Don Daily

=== Semifinals ===
ESPN2

March 11
6:00 PM

Recap

#1 Kansas 70, #5 Baylor 66
Scoring by half: 21–23, 49–43
Pts: Perry Ellis 20; Rebs: Lucas, Bragg Jr. 7 Asts: Devonte' Graham 8	Pts: Al Freeman 14; Rebs: Rico Gathers 9 Asts: Al Freeman 3

Sprint Center, Kansas City, Missouri
Attendance: 18,972
Referees: Kipp Kissinger, Keith Kimble, Mark Whitehead

ESPN2

March 11
8:00 PM

Recap

#2 West Virginia 69, #3 Oklahoma 67
Scoring by half: 30–29, 39–38
Pts: Jevon Carter 26; Rebs: Devin Williams 11; Asts: Holton, Miles Jr. 3	Pts: Isaiah Cousins 15; Rebs: Khadeem Lattin 8 Asts: Isaiah Cousins 4

Sprint Center, Kansas City, Missouri
Attendance: 18,972
Referees: John Higgins, Don Daily, Doug Sirmons

=== Championship ===
ESPN

March 12
5:00 PM

Recap

#1 Kansas 81, #2 West Virginia 71
Scoring by half: 33–34, 48–37
Pts: Devonte' Graham 27; Rebs: Landen Lucas 7 Asts: Frank Mason III 7	Pts: Devin Williams 31; Rebs: Devin Williams 10; Asts: Jevon Carter 4

Sprint Center, Kansas City, Missouri
Attendance: 19,046
Referees: Tom Eades, Doug Sirmons, Mark Whitehead

== All-Tournament Team ==
Most Outstanding Player – Devonte’ Graham, Kansas

Player	Team	Position	Class
Devonte’ Graham	Kansas	So.	G
Perry Ellis	Kansas	Sr.	G
Buddy Hield	Oklahoma	Sr.	G
Devin Williams	West Virginia	Jr.	F
Georges Niang	Iowa State	Sr.	F

== See also ==
- 2016 Big 12 Conference women's basketball tournament
- 2016 NCAA Division I men's basketball tournament
- 2015–16 NCAA Division I men's basketball rankings
