= Jaysean Paige =

Puerto Rican basketball player (born 1994)

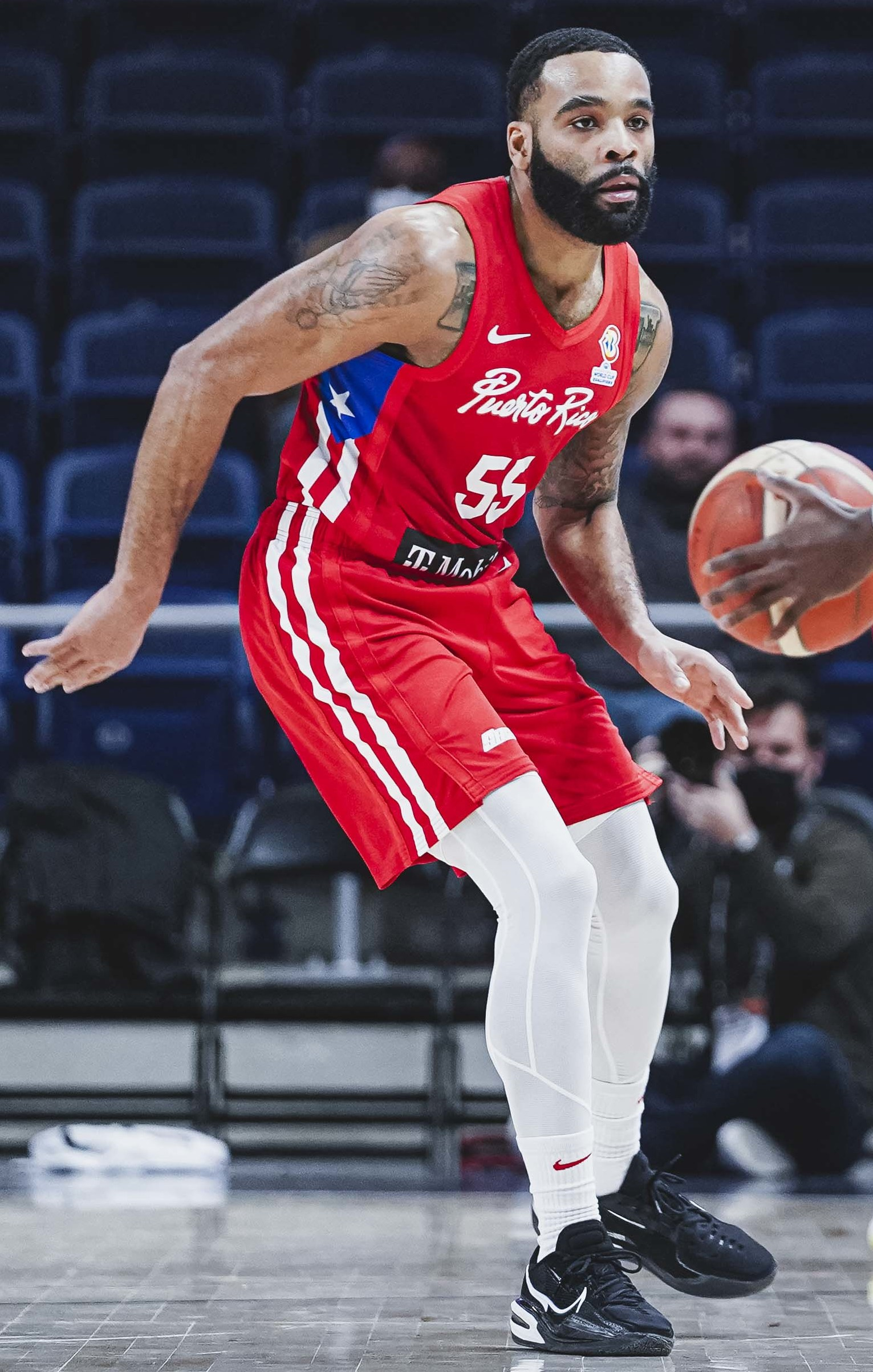
- Paige with Puerto Rico during qualifiers for the 2023 FIBA Basketball World Cup

No. 6 – Mets de Guaynabo
- Position: Point guard / shooting guard
- League: BSN

Personal information
- Born: July 30, 1994 (age 32) Jamestown, New York, U.S.
- Listed height: 6 ft 2 in (1.88 m)
- Listed weight: 200 lb (91 kg)

Career information
- High school: Jamestown (Jamestown, New York); Perry Central (Hazard, Kentucky)
- College: College of Southern Idaho (2012–2013); Moberly Area CC (2013–2014); West Virginia (2014–2016)
- NBA draft: 2016: undrafted
- Playing career: 2016–present

Career history
- 2016: Oettinger Rockets
- 2017: Karpoš Sokoli
- 2017–2018: Newcastle Eagles
- 2018–2019: C' Chartres Basket
- 2019–2020: Maine Red Claws
- 2020: Indios de Mayagüez
- 2021: Atomerőmű SE
- 2021: Indios de Mayagüez
- 2021–2022: Maine Celtics
- 2021–2022: Detroit Pistons
- 2022: Indios de Mayagüez
- 2023: Mets de Guaynabo
- 2023: Plateros de Fresnillo
- 2023–2024: Raptors 905
- 2024: Fuerza Regia de Monterrey
- 2024–present: Mets de Guaynabo
- 2025–2026: Halcones de Xalapa

Career highlights
- First-team All-BBL (2018); Big 12 Sixth Man Award (2016); Second-team All-Big 12 (2016)
- Stats at NBA.com
- Stats at Basketball Reference

Jaysean Paige (born July 30, 1994) is a Puerto Rican professional basketball player for the Mets de Guaynabo of the Baloncesto Superior Nacional (BSN). He played college basketball for the West Virginia Mountaineers and previously played for the College of Southern Idaho and Moberly Area Community College.

== High school career ==
Paige attended Jamestown High School in Jamestown, New York, where he played football and basketball. He was named Western New York Player of the Year after leading Jamestown to a state runner-up finish as a junior. He averaged 27 points and eight rebounds per game that season. As a senior, he transferred to Perry County Central High School in Hazard, Kentucky, where he posted averages of 21 points and 6.7 rebounds per game.

== College career ==
Paige attended the College of Southern Idaho as a freshman, where he averaged 13.6 points, 4.4 rebounds, and 2.1 steals per game. He transferred to Moberly Area Community College as a sophomore, and averaged over 21 points and four rebounds per game. in May 2014, he signed with West Virginia to play under Bob Huggins. He had considered Southern Miss, but decided not to commit after Donnie Tyndall was fired. As a junior, he averaged 5.6 points and 1.9 rebounds per game, starting 10 games. His season-high 18 points came against Baylor in the Big 12 Championship.

Paige was the team's sixth man as a senior, a role he relished. Against first-ranked Kansas, Paige had 26 points, five steals and four rebounds as the Mountaineers upset the Jayhawks 74–63. He scored a career-high 34 points in a 97–87 victory over Iowa State on February 22. Paige averaged 14.3 point per game in his senior season. He was named to the Second Team All-Big 12 and was the conference Sixth man Award honoree (unanimous selection).

== Professional career ==
=== Oettinger Rockets Gotha (2016) ===
He went undrafted in the 2016 NBA Draft. He signed with Oettinger Rockets Gotha of Germany's Pro A league on August 8, 2016.

=== Karpoš Sokoli (2017) ===
On 26 November 2016, he signed with Karpoš Sokoli

=== Newcastle Eagles (2017–2018) ===
On 8 August 2017 Paige signed for the seven-time British Basketball League champions Newcastle Eagles. Paige made his debut for the Eagles on 29 September, scoring 30 points in a 148–60 victory.

=== Maine Red Claws (2019–2020) ===
For the 2019–20 season, Paige joined the Maine Red Claws of the NBA G League. On February 11, 2020, he posted 27 points, five assists, two rebounds, one steal and one block in an overtime win over the Fort Wayne Mad Ants.

=== Maine Celtics (2021) ===
On October 23, 2021, Paige signed with the Maine Celtics. He averaged 16.9 points, 2.5 rebounds, 1.6 assists, 1.1 steals per game.

=== Detroit Pistons (2021–2022) ===
On December 31, 2021, Paige signed a 10-day contract with the Detroit Pistons via the hardship exemption. He made his NBA debut on January 1.

=== Return to Maine (2022) ===
On January 7, 2022, Paige was reacquired by the Maine Celtics. However, he was waived on March 8 after suffering a season-ending injury.

=== Plateros de Fresnillo (2023) ===
On August 5, 2023, Paige signed with Plateros de Fresnillo of the Mexican LNBP.

=== Raptors 905 (2023–2024) ===
On October 30, 2023, Paige joined Raptors 905. However, he was waived on February 21, 2024.

=== Return to Guaynabo (2024–present) ===
After being waived by the Raptors, Paige returned to the Mets de Guaynabo.

== Career statistics ==
Legend
GP	Games played	GS	Games started	MPG	Minutes per game
FG%	Field goal percentage	3P%	3-point field goal percentage	FT%	Free throw percentage
RPG	Rebounds per game	APG	Assists per game	SPG	Steals per game
BPG	Blocks per game	PPG	Points per game	**Bold**	Career high

=== NBA ===
Year	Team	GP	GS	MPG	FG%	3P%	FT%	RPG	APG	SPG	BPG	PPG
2021–22	Detroit	1	0	7.0	.000	.000	—	1.0	1.0	.0	.0	.0
Career		1	0	7.0	.000	.000	—	1.0	1.0	.0	.0	.0

== Personal life ==
Paige is the son of Lashawn Paige and Jessica Echevarria. He majored in multidisciplinary studies.
