= 2015–16 TCU Horned Frogs men's basketball team =

American college basketball season

2015–16 TCU Horned Frogs men's basketball
- Conference: Big 12 Conference
- Record: 12–21 (2–16 Big 12)
- Head coach: Trent Johnson (4th season)
- Assistant coaches: Kwanza Johnson; Brent Scott; Chris Tifft
- Home arena: Schollmaier Arena; Wilkerson-Greines Activity Center

2015–16 Big 12 men's basketball standings
	Conf.				Overall
Team	W		L	PCT	W		L	PCT
No. 1 Kansas †	15	–	3	.833	33	–	5	.868
No. 8 West Virginia	13	–	5	.722	26	–	9	.743
No. 7 Oklahoma	12	–	6	.667	29	–	8	.784
Texas	11	–	7	.611	20	–	13	.606
No. 21 Baylor	10	–	8	.556	22	–	12	.647
No. 22 Iowa State	10	–	8	.556	23	–	12	.657
Texas Tech	9	–	9	.500	19	–	13	.594
Kansas State	5	–	13	.278	17	–	16	.515
Oklahoma State	3	–	15	.167	12	–	20	.375
TCU	2	–	16	.111	12	–	21	.364
† 2016 Big 12 Tournament winner Rankings from AP poll

The 2015–16 TCU Horned Frogs men's basketball team represented Texas Christian University in the 2015–16 NCAA Division I men's basketball season, led by head coach Trent Johnson in his fourth and final season at TCU. The Horned Frogs were members of the Big 12 Conference and played their home games at Schollmaier Arena, which reopened in December after a $72 million upgrade. Some early-season, non-conference games were played in the TCU University Recreation Center and the Wilkerson-Greines Activity Center while construction on Schollmaier Arena was completed. The Horned Frogs finished the season 12–21, 2–16 in Big 12 play to finish in last place. They defeated Texas Tech in the first round of the Big 12 tournament to advance to the quarterfinals where they lost to West Virginia.

On March 14, head coach Trent Johnson was fired. He finished at TCU with a four-year record of 50–79.

== Previous season ==
In 2014–15, the Horned Frogs started the season 14–0, climbing to #25 in national polls. The Frogs went on to finish the 2014–15 season with a record of 18–15 (4–14, Big 12), and advanced to the quarterfinals of the Big 12 tournament, where they fell to the Kansas Jayhawks.

== Personnel ==
=== Departures ===
Name	Number	Pos.	Height	Weight	Year	Hometown	Reason
Charles Hill Jr.	0	G	6'2"	185	Junior	Fort Worth, TX	Graduate transferred to Tarleton State
Josh Brown	3	G	6'6"	209	RS Sophomore	Dallas, TX	Walk-on; didn't return
Amric Fields	4	F	6'9"	220	Senior	Oklahoma City, OK	Graduated
Kyan Anderson	5	G	5'11"	175	Senior	Fort Worth, TX	Graduated
Christian Gore	13	G	6'2"	175	RS Sophomore	El Paso, TX	Left program; set to graduate in December 2015
Hudson Price	21	G	6'6"	200	Sophomore	Orlando, FL	Transferred to Charlotte
Link Kabadyundi	22	C	7'1"	240	Freshman	Montreal, QC	Transferred to Blinn College
Trey Zeigler	32	G	6'5"	203	RS Senior	Detroit, MI	Graduated

=== Incoming transfers ===
Name	Number	Pos.	Height	Weight	Year	Hometown	Reason
Malique Trent	3	G	6'2"	185	RS Sophomore	Portsmouth, VA	Junior college transfer from New Mexico Junior College.
Vladimír Brodziansky	10	F	6'10"	200	Sophomore	Prievidza, Slovakia	Junior college transfer from Pratt Community College.

=== Recruiting ===
College recruiting information
Name	Hometown	School	Height	Weight	Commit date
Jalon Miller; SF	Dallas, TX	Seagoville High School	6 ft 8 in (2.03 m)	215 lb (98 kg)	Oct 24, 2014
Jalon Miller; SF	Recruit ratings: Scout: Rivals: ESPN:				
Lyrik Shreiner; SG	Glendale, AZ	Fishburne Military School	6 ft 4 in (1.93 m)	190 lb (86 kg)	Mar 7, 2015
Lyrik Shreiner; SG	Recruit ratings: Scout: Rivals: ESPN:				
Overall recruit ranking: Scout: Not Ranked Rivals: Not Ranked ESPN: Not Ranked
Note: In many cases, Scout, Rivals, 247Sports, On3, and ESPN may conflict in their listings of height and weight.; In these cases, the average was taken. ESPN grades are on a 100-point scale.; Sources: "TCU 2015 Basketball Commitments". Rivals.; "2015 TCU Basketball Commits". Scout.; "ESPN". ESPN.; "Scout.com Team Recruiting Rankings". Scout.; "2015 Team Ranking". Rivals.

=== Roster ===
2015–16 TCU Horned Frogs men's basketball team
Players
Coaches

Pos.	#	Name	Height	Weight	Year	Previous school	Hometown
G	0	Lyrik Shreiner	6 ft 3 in (1.91 m)	190 lb (86 kg)	Fr	Hillcrest Academy	Phoenix, AZ
G	1	Chauncey Collins	6 ft 0 in (1.83 m)	180 lb (82 kg)	So	OKC Storm Home School	Oklahoma City, OK
G	2	Michael Williams	6 ft 2 in (1.88 m)	195 lb (88 kg)	Jr	Reagan	San Antonio, TX
G	3	Malique Trent	6 ft 2 in (1.88 m)	185 lb (84 kg)	RS So	Norcom; New Mexico JC	Portsmouth, VA
F	10	Vladimír Brodziansky	6 ft 10 in (2.08 m)	215 lb (98 kg)	So	Canarias Basketball Academy; Pratt CC	Prievidza, Slovakia
F	11	Brandon Parrish	6 ft 6 in (1.98 m)	210 lb (95 kg)	Jr	Seguin	Arlington, TX
F	15	Jalon Miller	6 ft 8 in (2.03 m)	235 lb (107 kg)	Fr	Seagoville	Dallas, TX
G	20	Dalton Dry (W)	6 ft 3 in (1.91 m)	195 lb (88 kg)	So	Fort Worth Country Day	Fort Worth, TX
F	23	Devonta Abrom	6 ft 8 in (2.03 m)	260 lb (118 kg)	RS Sr	Seagoville; Arkansas	Dallas, TX
C	32	Karviar Shephard	6 ft 10 in (2.08 m)	230 lb (104 kg)	Jr	Prime Prep Academy	Dallas, TX
F	33	Chris Washburn (injured)	6 ft 8 in (2.03 m)	240 lb (109 kg)	RS Jr	South Grand Prairie; UTEP	Grand Prairie, TX
F	34	Kenrich Williams (injured)	6 ft 7 in (2.01 m)	205 lb (93 kg)	Jr	University; New Mexico JC	Waco, TX

Head coach

- Trent Johnson (Boise State)

Assistant coach(es)

- Kwanza Johnson (Tulsa)
- Brent Scott (Rice)
- Chris Tifft (Nevada)

Legend

- (C) Team captain
- (S) Suspended
- (I) Ineligible
- (W) Walk-on
- Injured
- Current redshirt

Roster

Roster Source: GoFrogs.com

== Schedule ==
Date time, TV	Rank^{#}	Opponent^{#}	Result	Record	Site (attendance) city, state
Regular season
11/13/2015*; 8:30 pm		Southeastern Louisiana	W 90–77	1–0	University Recreation Center (3,341); Fort Worth, TX
11/19/2015*; 7:00 pm, FSSW+		Houston Baptist; Cancún Challenge	W 90–63	2–0	Wilkerson-Greines Activity Center (3,233); Fort Worth, TX
11/21/2015*; 1:00 pm		South Dakota State; Cancún Challenge	L 67–76	2–1	Wilkerson-Greines Activity Center (3,193); Fort Worth, TX
11/24/2015*; 5:00 pm, CBSSN		vs. Rhode Island; Cancún Challenge semifinals	L 60–67	2–2	Hard Rock Hotel Riviera Maya (982); Cancún, Mexico
11/25/2015*; 5:00 pm, CBSSN		vs. Illinois State; Cancún Challenge 3rd place game	W 71–60	3–2	Hard Rock Hotel Riviera Maya (982); Cancún, Mexico
12/02/2015*; 7:00 pm, FSSW		No. 22 SMU; Battle for the Iron Skillet	L 70–75	3–3	Wilkerson-Greines Activity Center (3,672); Fort Worth, TX
12/05/2015*; 7:00 pm, FSSW		Colgate	W 76–49	4–3	University Recreation Center (3,296); Fort Worth, TX
12/08/2015*; 10:00 pm, P12N		at Washington	L 67–92	4–4	Alaska Airlines Arena (5,651); Seattle, WA
12/11/2015*; 7:00 pm, FSSW+		Prairie View A&M	W 73–55	5–4	Wilkerson-Greines Activity Center (3,658); Fort Worth, TX
12/20/2015*; 1:00 pm, FSSW		Abilene Christian	W 80–69	6–4	Schollmaier Arena (4,791); Fort Worth, TX
12/23/2015*; 7:00 pm, ESPN3		at Bradley	W 53–49	7–4	Carver Arena (5,560); Peoria, IL
12/28/2015*; 7:00 pm, FSSW+		Delaware State	W 75–47	8–4	Schollmaier Arena (4,024); Fort Worth, TX
01/02/2016; 3:00 pm, ESPNews		at Oklahoma State	L 48–69	8–5 (0–1)	Gallagher-Iba Arena (5,191); Stillwater, OK
01/04/2016; 6:00 pm, ESPN2		No. 17 West Virginia	L 87–95	8–6 (0–2)	Schollmaier Arena (4,239); Fort Worth, TX
01/09/2016; 6:00 pm, ESPNU		Texas	W 58–57	9–6 (1–2)	Schollmaier Arena (6,673); Fort Worth, TX
01/13/2016; 7:15 pm, ESPNews		at No. 22 Baylor	L 54–82	9–7 (1–3)	Ferrell Center (5,764); Waco, TX
01/16/2016; 1:00 pm, ESPN		at No. 1 Kansas	L 63–70	9–8 (1–4)	Allen Fieldhouse (16,300); Lawrence, KS
01/18/2016; 6:00 pm, ESPNU		Texas Tech; West Texas Championship (Saddle Trophy)	L 69–76	9–9 (1–5)	Schollmaier Arena (5,905); Fort Worth, TX
01/23/2016; 3:00 pm, ESPNU		No. 19 Iowa State	L 60–73	9–10 (1–6)	Schollmaier Arena (6,014); Fort Worth, TX
01/26/2016; 7:00 pm, LHN		at Texas	L 54–71	9–11 (1–7)	Frank Erwin Center (11,282); Austin, TX
01/30/2016*; 1:00 pm, ESPN2		Tennessee; Big 12/SEC Challenge	W 75–63	10–11	Schollmaier Arena (5,761); Fort Worth, TX
02/02/2016; 7:00 pm, ESPNews		at No. 1 Oklahoma	L 72–95	10–12 (1–8)	Lloyd Noble Center (7,455); Norman, OK
02/06/2016; 11:00 am, ESPN		No. 7 Kansas	L 56–75	10–13 (1–9)	Schollmaier Arena (6,516); Fort Worth, TX
02/08/2016; 6:00 pm, ESPNU		Oklahoma State	W 63–56	11–13 (2–9)	Schollmaier Arena (4,957); Fort Worth, TX
02/13/2016; 11:00 am, ESPNU		at No. 10 West Virginia	L 42–73	11–14 (2–10)	WVU Coliseum (13,137); Morgantown, WV
02/16/2016; 7:00 pm, ESPNews		Kansas State	L 49–63	11–15 (2–11)	Schollmaier Arena (4,999); Fort Worth, TX
02/20/2016; 6:30 pm, ESPNU		at No. 13 Iowa State	L 83–92	11–16 (2–12)	Hilton Coliseum (14,384); Ames, IA
02/23/2016; 8:00 pm, ESPNews		at Texas Tech	L 79–83	11–17 (2–13)	United Supermarkets Arena (9,676); Lubbock, TX
02/27/2016; 7:00 pm, ESPNU		No. 19 Baylor	L 71–86	11–18 (2–14)	Schollmaier Arena (6,364); Fort Worth, TX
03/02/2016; 7:00 pm, FSSW		at Kansas State	L 54–79	11–19 (2–15)	Bramlage Coliseum (11,518); Manhattan, KS
03/05/2016; 12:00 pm, ESPNews		No. 6 Oklahoma	L 67–75	11–20 (2–16)	Schollmaier Arena (6,532); Fort Worth, TX
Big 12 tournament
03/09/2016; 8:00 pm, ESPNU	(10)	vs. (7) Texas Tech; First round	W 67–62	12–20	Sprint Center (18,972); Kansas City, MO
03/10/2016; 6:00 pm, ESPNU	(10)	vs. (2) No. 9 West Virginia; Quarterfinals	L 66–86	12–21	Sprint Center (18,972); Kansas City, MO
*Non-conference game. ^{#}Rankings from AP Poll / Coaches' Poll. (#) Tournament seedings in parentheses. All times are in Central Time.

Schedule Source: GoFrogs.com

== Awards ==
Vladimir Brodziansky

- Big 12 Newcomer of the Week (week 1)

== See also ==
- Big 12 men's basketball tournament
- 2015–16 TCU Horned Frogs women's basketball team
- TCU Athletics
- Schollmaier Arena
