= 2015–16 Texas Tech Red Raiders basketball team =

American college basketball season

2015–16 Texas Tech Red Raiders basketball

NCAA tournament, First Round
- Conference: Big 12 Conference
- Record: 19–13 (9–9 Big 12)
- Head coach: Tubby Smith (3rd season)
- Assistant coaches: Joe Esposito (3rd season); Vince Taylor (3rd season); Pooh Williamson (3rd season)
- Home arena: United Supermarkets Arena

2015–16 Big 12 men's basketball standings
	Conf.				Overall
Team	W		L	PCT	W		L	PCT
No. 1 Kansas †	15	–	3	.833	33	–	5	.868
No. 8 West Virginia	13	–	5	.722	26	–	9	.743
No. 7 Oklahoma	12	–	6	.667	29	–	8	.784
Texas	11	–	7	.611	20	–	13	.606
No. 21 Baylor	10	–	8	.556	22	–	12	.647
No. 22 Iowa State	10	–	8	.556	23	–	12	.657
Texas Tech	9	–	9	.500	19	–	13	.594
Kansas State	5	–	13	.278	17	–	16	.515
Oklahoma State	3	–	15	.167	12	–	20	.375
TCU	2	–	16	.111	12	–	21	.364
† 2016 Big 12 Tournament winner Rankings from AP poll

The 2015–16 Texas Tech Red Raiders basketball team represented Texas Tech University in the 2015–16 NCAA Division I men's basketball season. The Red Raiders were led by the 2016 Big 12 coach of the year Tubby Smith. They played their home games at the United Supermarkets Arena in Lubbock, Texas and were members of the Big 12 Conference. They finished the season 19–13, 9–9 in Big 12 play to finish in seventh place. They lost in the first round of the Big 12 tournament to TCU. They received an at-large bid to the NCAA tournament where they lost in the first round to Butler.

Smith departed for the head coaching job with the University of Memphis on April 14, 2016.

== Previous season ==
The Red Raiders finished the season 13–19 (3–15 in Big 12 play) to finish in last place in the Big 12. They lost in the first round of the Big 12 tournament to the Texas Longhorns.

== Departures ==
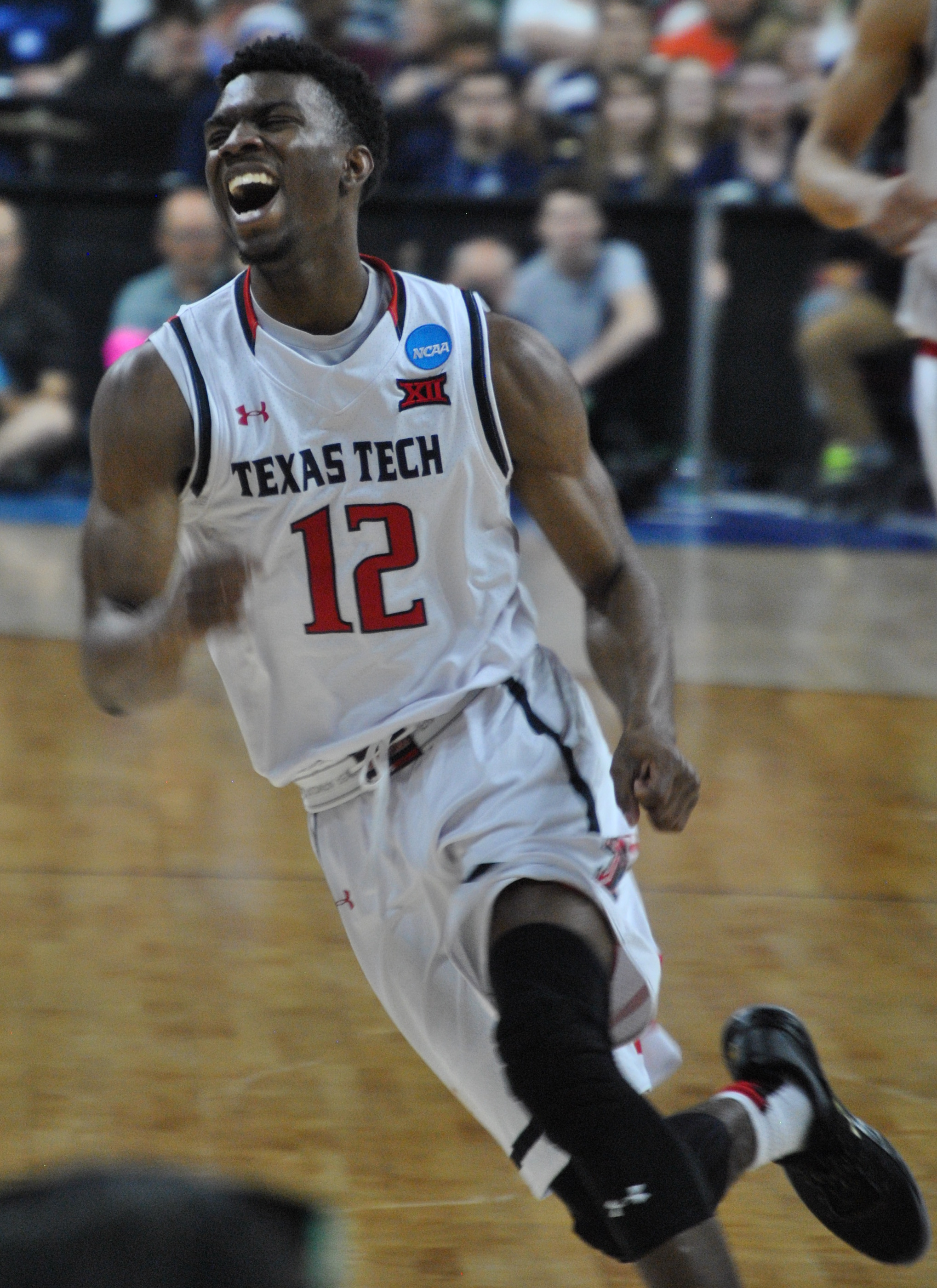
Keenan Evans

Name	Number	Pos.	Height	Weight	Year	Hometown	Notes
Stan Mays	2	G	6'2"	185	Sophomore	Baton Rouge, LA	Walk-on; left the team
Randy Onwuasor	3	G	6'3"	190	Sophomore	Inglewood, CA	Transferred to Southern Utah
Justin Jamison	4	F	6'9"	260	Junior	Garfield Heights, OH	Graduate transferred to MidAmerican Nazarene
Luke Adams	13	G	5'9"	170	Senior	Big Spring, TX	Graduated
Robert Turner	14	G	6'3"	180	Senior	Augusta, GA	Graduated
Alex Foster	34	F	6'8"	225	Sophomore	Joliet, IL	Transferred to Bradley
Clark Lammert	35	F	6'8"	210	Senior	San Antonio, TX	Graduated

=== Incoming transfers ===
Name	Number	Pos.	Height	Weight	Year	Hometown	Notes
Devon Thomas	2	G	5'10"	167	Junior	Baltimore, MD	Junior college transferred from Cloud County Community College

== Recruits ==
College recruiting
Name	Hometown	School	Height	Weight	Commit date
Jordan Jackson; SG	Houston, TX	St. Pius X High School	6 ft 4 in (1.93 m)	175 lb (79 kg)	Oct 12, 2014
Jordan Jackson; SG	Recruit ratings: Rivals: 247Sports: ESPN:				
C.J. Williamson Jr. PG	Orlando, FL	Maynard Evans High School	6 ft 7 in (2.01 m)	200 lb (91 kg)	Oct 18, 2014
C.J. Williamson Jr. PG	Recruit ratings: Scout: Rivals: 247Sports: ESPN:				
Overall recruit ranking:
Note: In many cases, Scout, Rivals, 247Sports, On3, and ESPN may conflict in their listings of height and weight.; In these cases, the average was taken. ESPN grades are on a 100-point scale.; Sources: "2015 Team Ranking". Rivals.

== Roster ==
2015–16 Texas Tech Red Raiders men's basketball team
Players
Coaches

Pos.	#	Name	Height	Weight	Year	Previous school	Hometown
G	0	Devaugntah Williams	6 ft 2 in (1.88 m)	200 lb (91 kg)	Sr	Canton; Missouri-West Plains	Canton, OH
G	2	Devon Thomas	5 ft 10 in (1.78 m)	175 lb (79 kg)	Jr	Kimball Union Academy; Cloud County CC	Silver Springs, MD
G	3	C. J. Williamson	6 ft 7 in (2.01 m)	210 lb (95 kg)	Fr	Evans	Orlando, FL
G	4	Donovan Ham (W)	6 ft 2 in (1.88 m)	200 lb (91 kg)	Fr	North Atlanta	Atlanta, GA
F	5	Justin Gray	6 ft 6 in (1.98 m)	195 lb (88 kg)	So	Berkeley Prep	Tampa, FL
F	11	Zach Smith	6 ft 9 in (2.06 m)	220 lb (100 kg)	So	Plano East	Plano, TX
G	12	Keenan Evans	6 ft 4 in (1.93 m)	180 lb (82 kg)	So	Berkner	Richardson, TX
F	15	Aaron Ross	6 ft 9 in (2.06 m)	220 lb (100 kg)	RS Jr	Parkview	North Little Rock, AR
G	20	Toddrick Gotcher (C)	6 ft 4 in (1.93 m)	200 lb (91 kg)	RS Sr	Lakeview	Garland, TX
F	21	Rokas Ulvydas	6 ft 11 in (2.11 m)	240 lb (109 kg)	So	Mt. Zion Prep-MD	Kaunas, Lithuania
G	22	Jordan Jackson	6 ft 4 in (1.93 m)	185 lb (84 kg)	Fr	St. Pius X	Houston, TX
G	30	Andrew Sorrells (W)	6 ft 3 in (1.91 m)	170 lb (77 kg)	Fr	Birdville	North Richland Hills, TX
C	32	Norense Odiase (injured)	6 ft 10 in (2.08 m)	255 lb (116 kg)	So	North Crowley	Crowley, TX
C	34	Matthew Temple (W)	6 ft 10 in (2.08 m)	240 lb (109 kg)	Jr	Rider High School	Wichita Falls, TX

Head coach

- Tubby Smith (High Point)

Assistant coach(es)

- Joe Esposito (Marist)
- Vince Taylor (Duke)
- Pooh Williamson (Tulsa)

Legend

- (C) Team captain
- (S) Suspended
- (I) Ineligible
- (W) Walk-on
- Injured
- Current redshirt

Roster

== Schedule ==
Date time, TV	Rank^{#}	Opponent^{#}	Result	Record	High points	High rebounds	High assists	Site (attendance) city, state
Exhibition
11/02/2015*; 7:00 pm, Texas Tech TV		Concordia (TX)	W 100–49		15 – Tied	15 – Ross	5 – Williamson	United Supermarkets Arena (4,677); Lubbock, TX
11/09/2015*; 7:00 pm, Texas Tech TV		West Texas A&M	W 91–74		23 – Gotcher	8 – Manderson	4 – Williams	United Supermarkets Arena (5,236); Lubbock, TX
Non-conference
11/13/2015*; 8:00 pm, FCS		High Point	W 77–73	1–0	26 – Williams	8 – Williams	3 – Williams	United Supermarkets Arena (5,881); Lubbock, TX
11/19/2015*; 6:00 pm, ESPN2		vs. No. 16 Utah; Puerto Rico Tip-Off quarterfinals	L 63–73	1–1	12 – Gotcher	8 – Smith	5 – Gotcher	Roberto Clemente Coliseum (1,947); San Juan, PR
11/20/2015*; 4:00 pm, ESPNU		vs. Mississippi State; Puerto Rico Tip-Off consolation round	W 76–74	2–1	15 – Williams	10 – Odiase	3 – Williams	Roberto Clemente Coliseum (2,001); San Juan, PR
11/22/2015*; 1:30 pm, ESPNU		vs. Minnesota; Puerto Rico Tip-Off 5th place game	W 81–68	3–1	21 – Williams	9 – Ross	5 – Evans	Roberto Clemente Coliseum (1,492); San Juan, PR
11/28/2015*; 3:00 pm, FSSW+		Hawaii	W 82–74	4–1	19 – Williams	7 – Williams	4 – Williams	United Supermarkets Arena (7,132); Lubbock, TX
12/02/2015*; 8:00 pm, FSSW+		Sam Houston State	W 71–56	5–1	16 – Odiase	14 – Smith	4 – Smith	United Supermarkets Arena (6,545); Lubbock, TX
12/09/2015*; 8:00 pm, FSSW+		Tennessee–Martin	W 68–49	6–1	20 – Gotcher	7 – Ross	7 – Evans	United Supermarkets Arena (5,767); Lubbock, TX
12/16/2015*; 7:00 pm, FSSW+		South Dakota State	W 79–67	7–1	17 – Gotcher	6 – Smith	4 – Evans	United Supermarkets Arena (5,438); Lubbock, TX
12/19/2015*; 3:00 pm, FSSW+		Arkansas–Pine Bluff	W 94–54	8–1	15 – Ross	7 – Odiase	4 – Williams	United Supermarkets Arena (6,612); Lubbock, TX
12/22/2015*; 2:00 pm, FSSW		Arkansas–Little Rock	W 65–53	9–1	12 – Gotcher	12 – Smith	3 – Evans	United Supermarkets Arena (5,955); Lubbock, TX
12/29/2015*; 4:00 pm, FSSW+		Richmond	W 85–70	10–1	17 – Williams	9 – Odiase	5 – Evans	United Supermarkets Arena (1,994); Lubbock, TX
Conference games
01/02/2016; 1:00 pm, ESPNU		Texas	W 82–74	11–1 (1–0)	23 – Williams	7 – Odiase	3 – Evans	United Supermarkets Arena (12,689); Lubbock, TX
01/06/2016; 8:00 pm, ESPNU		at No. 13 Iowa State	L 69–76	11–2 (1–1)	14 – Gray	9 – Gray	8 – Gotcher	Hilton Coliseum (14,384); Ames, IA
01/09/2016; 8:00 pm, ESPNU		No. 1 Kansas	L 59–69	11–3 (1–2)	14 – Odiase	6 – Smith	3 – Thomas	United Supermarkets Arena (14,231); Lubbock, TX
01/12/2016; 7:00 pm, FSSW		at Kansas State	L 70–83	11–4 (1–3)	23 – Gray	8 – Gray	4 – Ross	Bramlage Coliseum (12,316); Manhattan, KS
01/16/2016; 2:00 pm, FSSW		No. 22 Baylor	L 60–63	11–5 (1–4)	16 – Williams	7 – Smith	3 – Odiase	United Supermarkets Arena (12,827); Lubbock, TX
01/18/2016; 6:00 pm, ESPNU		at TCU	W 76–69	12–5 (2–4)	16 – Ross	9 – Smith	5 – Smith	Schollmaier Arena (5,905); Fort Worth, TX
01/23/2016; 12:00 pm, ESPNews		No. 6 West Virginia	L 76–80	12–6 (2–5)	18 – Z. Smith	6 – Gray	3 – Thomas	United Supermarkets Arena (10,732); Lubbock, TX
01/26/2016; 6:00 pm, ESPN2		at No. 1 Oklahoma	L 67–91	12–7 (2–6)	20 – Gray	14 – Z. Smith	4 – Evans	Lloyd Noble Center (10,682); Norman, OK
01/30/2016*; 3:00 pm, ESPNU		at Arkansas; Big 12/SEC Challenge	L 68–75 ^{OT}	12–8	19 – Smith	9 – Ross	3 – Evans	Bud Walton Arena (15,975); Fayetteville, AR
02/03/2016; 6:00 pm, ESPNews		Oklahoma State	W 63–61 ^{OT}	13–8 (3–6)	22 – Ross	8 – Z. Smith	2 – Thomas	United Supermarkets Arena (10,032); Lubbock, TX
02/06/2016; 1:00 pm, LHN		at Texas	L 59–69	13–9 (3–7)	14 – Evans	7 – Z. Smith	4 – Z. Smith	Frank Erwin Center (14,951); Austin, TX
02/10/2016; 8:00 pm, ESPNU		No. 14 Iowa State	W 85–82 ^{OT}	14–9 (4–7)	20 – Ross	7 – Z. Smith	7 – Gotcher	United Supermarkets Arena (6,715); Lubbock, TX
02/13/2016; 7:00 pm, ESPNU		at No. 21 Baylor	W 84–66	15–9 (5–7)	21 – Evans	9 – Z. Smith	5 – Evans	Ferrell Center (7,540); Waco, TX
02/17/2016; 8:00 pm, ESPNU		No. 3 Oklahoma	W 65–63	16–9 (6–7)	17 – Ross	9 – Z. Smith	3 – Evans	United Supermarkets Arena (14,471); Lubbock, TX
02/20/2016; 8:30 pm, ESPNU		at Oklahoma State	W 71–61	17–9 (7–7)	24 – Gotcher	9 – Tied	4 – Evans	Gallagher-Iba Arena (4,679); Stillwater, OK
02/23/2016; 8:00 pm, ESPNews		TCU	W 83–79	18–9 (8–7)	25 – Ross	8 – Z. Smith	3 – 3 tied	United Supermarkets Arena (9,676); Lubbock, TX
02/27/2016; 11:00 am, ESPN		at No. 2 Kansas	L 58–67	18–10 (8–8)	20 – Gotcher	14 – Z. Smith	5 – Evans	Allen Fieldhouse (16,300); Lawrence, KS
03/02/2016; 6:00 pm, ESPNU		at No. 10 West Virginia	L 68–90	18–11 (8–9)	15 – Gray	5 – Ross	2 – 5 tied	WVU Coliseum (12,680); Morgantown, WV
03/05/2016; 2:00 pm, ESPNews		Kansas State	W 80–71	19–11 (9–9)	20 – Tied	6 – Tied	3 – Tied	United Supermarkets Arena (12,359); Lubbock, TX
Big 12 Tournament
03/09/2016; 8:30 pm, ESPNU	(7)	vs. (10) TCU; First Round	L 62–67	19–12	13 – Tied	15 – Z. Smith	5 – Williams	Sprint Center (18,972); Kansas City, MO
NCAA tournament
03/17/2016*; 11:40 am, truTV	(8 MW)	vs. (9 MW) Butler; First Round	L 61–71	19–13	18 – Williams	7 – Evans	5 – Evans	PNC Arena (19,722); Raleigh, NC
*Non-conference game. ^{#}Rankings from AP Poll. (#) Tournament seedings in parentheses. MW=Midwest. All times are in Central Time.
