= Chris Olivier =

American basketball player (born 1992)

No. 31 – Saga Ballooners
- Position: Power forward
- League: B.League

Personal information
- Born: March 27, 1992 (age 34) Chicago, Illinois, U.S.
- Listed height: 6 ft 8 in (2.03 m)
- Listed weight: 245 lb (111 kg)

Career information
- High school: Seton Academy (South Holland, Illinois)
- College: Eastern Illinois (2013–2015); Oklahoma State (2015–2016)
- NBA draft: 2016: undrafted
- Playing career: 2016–present

Career history
- 2016: Dinamo Tbilisi
- 2017: Golden Eagle Ylli
- 2017–2018: Kagoshima Rebnise
- 2018: Yamagata Wyverns
- 2018–2020: Tokyo Cinq Rêves
- 2020: Yamagata Wyverns
- 2020: Kumamoto Volters
- 2020–2021: Iwate Big Bulls
- 2021–2022: Tryhoop Okayama
- 2022–2023: Shonan United
- 2023–2024: Kanazawa Samuraiz
- 2024: Tokushima Gambarous
- 2025: Earthfriends Tokyo Z
- 2026: Veertien Mie
- 2026–present: Saga Ballooners

Christopher Anthony Olivier (born March 27, 1992) is an American professional basketball player for the Saga Ballooners of the Japanese B.League. He played college basketball for the Eastern Illinois Panthers and the Oklahoma State Cowboys.

== Early life ==
Christopher Anthony Olivier was born on March 27, 1992.

== Professional career ==
On October 18, 2024, Olivier signed with Tokushima Gambarous of the B.League. On November 11, his contract expired.

On February 27, 2025, he signed with Earthfriends Tokyo Z. On April 18, his contract was terminated.

== Career statistics ==
Legend
GP	Games played	GS	Games started	MPG	Minutes per game
FG%	Field goal percentage	3P%	3-point field goal percentage	FT%	Free throw percentage
RPG	Rebounds per game	APG	Assists per game	SPG	Steals per game
BPG	Blocks per game	PPG	Points per game	**Bold**	Career high

Year	Team	GP	GS	MPG	FG%	3P%	FT%	RPG	APG	SPG	BPG	PPG
2017-18	Kagoshima/Yamagata	47	16	26.0	.611	.182	.655	10.0	1.3	0.6	1.2	22.7
