= 2015–16 Oklahoma Sooners men's basketball team =

American college basketball season

2015–16 Oklahoma Sooners men's basketball

Diamond Head Classic champions

NCAA tournament, Final Four
- Conference: Big 12 Conference

Ranking
- Coaches: No. 4
- AP: No. 7
- Record: 29–8 (12–6 Big 12)
- Head coach: Lon Kruger (5th season)
- Assistant coaches: Steve Henson; Lew Hill; Chris Crutchfield
- Home arena: Lloyd Noble Center

2015–16 Big 12 men's basketball standings
	Conf.				Overall
Team	W		L	PCT	W		L	PCT
No. 1 Kansas †	15	–	3	.833	33	–	5	.868
No. 8 West Virginia	13	–	5	.722	26	–	9	.743
No. 7 Oklahoma	12	–	6	.667	29	–	8	.784
Texas	11	–	7	.611	20	–	13	.606
No. 21 Baylor	10	–	8	.556	22	–	12	.647
No. 22 Iowa State	10	–	8	.556	23	–	12	.657
Texas Tech	9	–	9	.500	19	–	13	.594
Kansas State	5	–	13	.278	17	–	16	.515
Oklahoma State	3	–	15	.167	12	–	20	.375
TCU	2	–	16	.111	12	–	21	.364
† 2016 Big 12 Tournament winner Rankings from AP poll

The 2015–16 Oklahoma Sooners basketball team represented the University of Oklahoma in the 2015–16 NCAA Division I men's basketball season. The Sooners were led by Lon Kruger in his fifth season. They played their home games at the Lloyd Noble Center in Norman, Oklahoma as a member of the Big 12 Conference. They finished the season 29–8, 12–6 in Big 12 play to finish in third place. They defeated Iowa State in the quarterfinals of the Big 12 tournament to advance to the semifinals where they lost to West Virginia. They received an at-large bid to the NCAA tournament where they defeated Cal State Bakersfield, VCU, Texas A&M, and Oregon to be champions of the West Regional and earn a trip to the Final Four for the fifth time in school history. In the Final Four, they lost to the eventual champion Villanova by 44 points, the largest margin in Final Four history.

== Previous season ==
The Sooners finished the season 24–11, 12–6 in Big 12 play to finish in a tie for second place. They advanced to the semifinals of the Big 12 tournament where they lost to Iowa State. They received an at-large bid to the NCAA tournament where they defeated Albany in the second round and Dayton in the third round to advance to the Sweet Sixteen where they lost to Michigan State.

== Departures ==
Name	Number	Pos.	Height	Weight	Year	Hometown	Notes
Frank Booker	1	G	6'4"	193	Sophomore	Augusta, GA	Transferred to Florida Atlantic
James Fraschilla	13	G	5'10"	154	Senior	Dallas, TX	Graduated
D. J. Bennett	31	F	6'8"	202	RS Senior	Chicago, IL	Graduated
TaShawn Thomas	35	F	6'8"	242	Senior	Killeen, TX	Graduated
Trey Slate	45	G	6'1"	205	Sophomore	Gore, OK	Walk-on; transferred

=== Incoming transfers ===
Name	Number	Pos.	Height	Weight	Year	Hometown	Previous School
Akolda Manyang	30	C	7'0"	235	Junior	Rochester, MN	Junior college transfer from Indian Hills Community College

== Recruits ==
College recruiting information
Name	Hometown	School	Height	Weight	Commit date
Rashard Odomes; SF	Copperas Cove, TX	Copperas Cove High School	6 ft 7 in (2.01 m)	205 lb (93 kg)	Sep 24, 2014
Rashard Odomes; SF	Recruit ratings: Scout: Rivals: 247Sports: ESPN:				
Christian James; SF	Houston, TX	Bellaire High School	6 ft 4 in (1.93 m)	205 lb (93 kg)	Oct 23, 2014
Christian James; SF	Recruit ratings: Scout: Rivals: 247Sports: ESPN:				
Overall recruit ranking:
Note: In many cases, Scout, Rivals, 247Sports, On3, and ESPN may conflict in their listings of height and weight.; In these cases, the average was taken. ESPN grades are on a 100-point scale.; Sources: "Oklahoma 2015 Basketball Commitments". Rivals.; "2015 Oklahoma Basketball Commits". Scout.; "ESPN". ESPN.; "Scout.com Team Recruiting Rankings". Scout.; "2015 Team Ranking". Rivals.

=== Recruit class of 2016 ===
College recruiting information (2016)
Name	Hometown	School	Height	Weight	Commit date
Kristian Doolittle; SF	Edmond, OK	Edmond Memorial High School	6 ft 6 in (1.98 m)	200 lb (91 kg)	Dec 2, 2014
Kristian Doolittle; SF	Recruit ratings: Scout: Rivals: 247Sports: ESPN:				
Overall recruit ranking:
Note: In many cases, Scout, Rivals, 247Sports, On3, and ESPN may conflict in their listings of height and weight.; In these cases, the average was taken. ESPN grades are on a 100-point scale.; Sources: "Oklahoma 2016 Basketball Commitments". Rivals.; "2016 Oklahoma Basketball Commits". Scout.; "ESPN". ESPN.; "Scout.com Team Recruiting Rankings". Scout.; "2016 Team Ranking". Rivals.

== Roster ==
2015–16 Oklahoma Sooners men's basketball team
Players
Coaches

Pos.	#	Name	Height	Weight	Year	Previous school	Hometown
F	00	Ryan Spangler	6 ft 8 in (2.03 m)	234 lb (106 kg)	RS Sr	Bridge Creek; Gonzaga	Bridge Creek, OK
F	1	Rashard Odomes	6 ft 6 in (1.98 m)	200 lb (91 kg)	Fr	Copperas Cove	Copperas Cove, TX
G	2	Dinjiyl Walker	6 ft 1 in (1.85 m)	203 lb (92 kg)	Sr	Iowa Western CC	Vaughan, ON
G	3	Christian James	6 ft 4 in (1.93 m)	218 lb (99 kg)	Fr	Bellaire	Houston, TX
C	4	Jamuni McNeace	6 ft 10 in (2.08 m)	215 lb (98 kg)	RS Fr	Allen	Allen, TX
G	10	Jordan Woodard	6 ft 0 in (1.83 m)	187 lb (85 kg)	Jr	Edmond Memorial	Arcadia, OK
G	11	Isaiah Cousins	6 ft 4 in (1.93 m)	200 lb (91 kg)	Sr	Mount Vernon	Mount Vernon, NY
F	12	Khadeem Lattin	6 ft 9 in (2.06 m)	208 lb (94 kg)	So	Redemption Christian Homeschool Acad.	Houston, TX
G	14	Bola Alade (W)	6 ft 4 in (1.93 m)	193 lb (88 kg)	RS Fr	John Paul II	Plano, TX
F	21	Dante Buford	6 ft 7 in (2.01 m)	221 lb (100 kg)	RS Fr	Arlington Country Day	Jacksonville, FL
G	22	Daniel Harper (W)	6 ft 1 in (1.85 m)	190 lb (86 kg)	RS Jr	Norman	Norman, OK
G	24	Buddy Hield	6 ft 3 in (1.91 m)	214 lb (97 kg)	Sr	Sunrise Christian Academy	Freeport, Bahamas
F	25	C. J. Cole (W)	6 ft 7 in (2.01 m)	245 lb (111 kg)	RS Jr	Sperry	Sperry, OK
C	30	Akolda Manyang	7 ft 0 in (2.13 m)	243 lb (110 kg)	Jr	Potter House Christian Academy; Indian Hills CC	Rochester, MN
F	41	Austin Mankin (W)	6 ft 7 in (2.01 m)	210 lb (95 kg)	Jr	Coppell	Coppell, TX

Head coach

- Lon Kruger (Kansas State)

Assistant coach(es)

- Steve Henson (Kansas State)
- Lew Hill (Wichita State)
- Chris Crutchfield (Omaha)

Legend

- (C) Team captain
- (S) Suspended
- (I) Ineligible
- (W) Walk-on
- Injured
- Current redshirt

Roster

== Schedule ==
Date time, TV	Rank^{#}	Opponent^{#}	Result	Record	Site (attendance) city, state
Exhibition
11/06/2015*; 7:00 pm, SSTV	No. 8	Washburn	W 112–62		Lloyd Noble Center (7,892); Norman, OK
11/12/2015*; 7:00 pm, FSOK	No. 8	Mid-America Christian	W 98–76		Lloyd Noble Center (7,123); Norman, OK
Regular season
11/17/2015*; 4:00 pm, ESPN	No. 8	at Memphis; College Hoops Tip-Off Marathon	W 84–78	1–0	FedEx Forum (12,688); Memphis, TN
11/20/2015*; 7:00 pm, SSTV	No. 8	McNeese State	W 85–56	2–0	Lloyd Noble Center (8,364); Norman, OK
11/24/2015*; 7:00 pm, FSSW+	No. 7	Incarnate Word	W 96–63	3–0	Lloyd Noble Center (7,332); Norman, OK
11/29/2015*; 1:30 pm, ESPN2	No. 7	Wisconsin	W 65–48	4–0	Lloyd Noble Center (6,543); Norman, OK
12/03/2015*; 7:00 pm, SSTV	No. 6	Central Arkansas	W 111–68	5–0	Lloyd Noble Center (7,109); Norman, OK
12/07/2015*; 6:00 pm, FS1	No. 7	vs. No. 9 Villanova; Pearl Harbor Classic	W 78–55	6–0	Bloch Arena (4,024); Honolulu, HI
12/12/2015*; 1:00 pm, SSTV	No. 7	Oral Roberts	W 96–73	7–0	Lloyd Noble Center (9,421); Norman, OK
12/19/2015*; 1:00 pm, ESPNU	No. 3	Creighton	W 87–74	8–0	Lloyd Noble Center (9,528); Norman, OK
12/22/2015*; 10:00 pm, ESPNU	No. 3	vs. Washington State; Diamond Head Classic quarterfinals	W 88–60	9–0	Stan Sheriff Center; Honolulu, HI
12/23/2015*; 8:00 pm, ESPN2	No. 3	at Hawaiʻi; Diamond Head Classic semifinals	W 84–81	10–0	Stan Sheriff Center; Honolulu, HI
12/25/2015*; 7:30 pm, ESPN2	No. 3	vs. Harvard; Diamond Head Classic championship	W 83–71	11–0	Stan Sheriff Center; Honolulu, HI
01/02/2016; 6:00 pm, ESPN2	No. 3	No. 11 Iowa State	W 87–83	12–0 (1–0)	Lloyd Noble Center (11,251); Norman, OK
01/04/2016; 8:00 pm, ESPN	No. 2	at No. 1 Kansas	L 106–109 ^{3OT}	12–1 (1–1)	Allen Fieldhouse (16,300); Lawrence, KS
01/09/2016; 3:30 pm, ESPNews	No. 2	Kansas State	W 86–76	13–1 (2–1)	Lloyd Noble Center (11,113); Norman, OK
01/13/2016; 8:00 pm, ESPNU	No. 2	at Oklahoma State; Bedlam Series	W 74–72	14–1 (3–1)	Gallagher-Iba Arena (9,380); Stillwater, OK
01/16/2016; 3:00 pm, ESPN2	No. 2	No. 11 West Virginia	W 70–68	15–1 (4–1)	Lloyd Noble Center (10,346); Norman, OK
01/18/2016; 8:00 pm, ESPN	No. 1	at No. 19 Iowa State	L 77–82	15–2 (4–2)	Hilton Coliseum (14,384); Ames, IA
01/23/2016; 11:00 am, ESPN	No. 1	at No. 13 Baylor	W 82–72	16–2 (5–2)	Ferrell Center (10,206); Waco, TX
01/26/2016; 6:00 pm, ESPN2	No. 1	Texas Tech	W 91–67	17–2 (6–2)	Lloyd Noble Center (10,682); Norman, OK
01/30/2016*; 4:00 pm, ESPN	No. 1	at LSU; Big 12/SEC Challenge	W 77–75	18–2	Maravich Center (13,822); Baton Rouge, LA
02/02/2016; 7:00 pm, ESPNews	No. 1	TCU	W 95–72	19–2 (7–2)	Lloyd Noble Center (7,455); Norman, OK
02/06/2016; 5:00 pm, ESPNU	No. 1	at Kansas State	L 69–80	19–3 (7–3)	Bramlage Coliseum (12,528); Manhattan, KS
02/08/2016; 8:00 pm, ESPN	No. 3	No. 24 Texas	W 63–60	20–3 (8–3)	Lloyd Noble Center (11,547); Norman, OK
02/13/2016; 1:30 pm, ESPN	No. 3	No. 6 Kansas; ESPN College GameDay	L 72–76	20–4 (8–4)	Lloyd Noble Center (12,247); Norman, OK
02/17/2016; 8:00 pm, ESPNU	No. 3	at Texas Tech	L 63–65	20–5 (8–5)	United Supermarkets Arena (14,471); Lubbock, TX
02/20/2016; 3:00 pm, ESPN	No. 3	at No. 14 West Virginia	W 76–62	21–5 (9–5)	WVU Coliseum (15,289); Morgantown, WV
02/24/2016; 8:00 pm, ESPNU	No. 3	Oklahoma State; Bedlam Series	W 71–49	22–5 (10–5)	Lloyd Noble Center (11,470); Norman, OK
02/27/2016; 1:00 pm, CBS	No. 3	at No. 25 Texas	L 63–76	22–6 (10–6)	Frank Erwin Center (16,540); Austin, TX
03/01/2016; 7:00 pm, ESPN2	No. 6	No. 19 Baylor	W 73–71	23–6 (11–6)	Lloyd Noble Center (11,563); Norman, OK
03/05/2016; 12:00 pm, ESPNews	No. 6	at TCU	W 75–67	24–6 (12–6)	Schollmaier Arena (6,532); Fort Worth, TX
Big 12 Tournament
03/10/2016; 8:00 pm, ESPNU	(3) No. 6	vs. (6) No. 21 Iowa State; Quarterfinals	W 79–76	25–6	Sprint Center (18,972); Kansas City, MO
03/11/2016; 8:00 pm, ESPN2	(3) No. 6	vs. (2) No. 9 West Virginia; Semifinals	L 67–69	25–7	Sprint Center (18,972); Kansas City, MO
NCAA tournament
3/18/2016*; 3:00 pm, TNT	(2 W) No. 7	vs. (15 W) Cal State Bakersfield; First Round	W 82–68	26–7	Chesapeake Energy Arena (15,662); Oklahoma City, OK
3/20/2016*; 4:15 pm, CBS	(2 W) No. 7	vs. (10 W) VCU; Second Round	W 85–81	27–7	Chesapeake Energy Arena (15,279); Oklahoma City, OK
03/24/2016*; 6:37 pm, TBS	(2 W) No. 7	vs. (3 W) No. 15 Texas A&M; Sweet Sixteen	W 77–63	28–7	Honda Center (17,601); Anaheim, CA
03/26/2016*; 5:07 pm, CBS	(2 W) No. 7	vs. (1 W) No. 5 Oregon; Elite Eight	W 80–68	29–7	Honda Center (16,232); Anaheim, CA
04/02/2016*; 5:09 pm, TBS	(2 W) No. 7	vs. (2 S) No. 6 Villanova; Final Four	L 51–95	29–8	NRG Stadium (75,505); Houston, TX
*Non-conference game. ^{#}Rankings from AP Poll. (#) Tournament seedings in parentheses. W=West Region. All times are in Central Time.

x- Sooner Sports Television (SSTV) is aired locally on Fox Sports. However the contract allows games to air on various affiliates. Those affiliates are FSSW, FSSW+, FSOK, FSOK+, and FCS Atlantic, Central, and Pacific.

== Rankings ==
Ranking movement Legend: ██ Increase in ranking. ██ Decrease in ranking. ██ Not ranked the previous week.
Poll	Pre	Wk 2	Wk 3	Wk 4	Wk 5	Wk 6	Wk 7	Wk 8	Wk 9	Wk 10	Wk 11	Wk 12	Wk 13	Wk 14	Wk 15	Wk 16	Wk 17	Wk 18	Post	Final
AP	8	8	7	6	7	3	3	3	2	2	1	1	1	3	3	3–T	6	6	7	*N/A
Coaches	8	8–T	6	8	8	3	2	2	1	2	1	2	2	3	3	4	6	6	7	4

*AP does not release post-NCAA tournament rankings
