= Leader Community Newspapers =

Australian newspaper publisher

Masthead for the Leader newspapers

The Leader Community Newspaper group publishes 20 digital titles covering metropolitan Melbourne in Victoria, Australia.

The group was downsized in 2016 and in 2020. Prior to this, it published 33 weekly print titles which were delivered to over 1.4 million homes. In early 2016, it had digital unique audience of 569,000 each month.

== History ==
In the early 1850s George Mott arrived in the Colony of Victoria and began work as a journalist with the Melbourne Argus.

In 1854 he started publishing newspapers in the Victorian goldfields near Beechworth and Chiltern. George Mott's two sons commenced publishing newspapers in Albury and one brother's branch of the family until recently (2005) published The Border Mail in that town.

The other brother, Decimus Mott, left the Murray area in 1924 and, with his sons, took over the established Northcote and Preston Leader (first published in 1888). From this paper, the Leader Community Newspaper group grew into its present stable of 33 separate mastheads.

In 1986 the group was sold to The Herald and Weekly Times Ltd. With the acquisition of The Herald and Weekly Times by News Corporation later that same year, the Leader Newspaper group became a part of News Limited Community Newspapers with a total of 95 publications throughout Adelaide, Brisbane, Darwin, Melbourne, Perth, Sydney and Tasmania.

In 2016, the group ceased producing seven newspapers. In April 2020, News Corporation announced that it would only be producing digital editions of newspapers, which required a subscription, from 6 April with printing suspended due to the impact of the coronavirus pandemic. In May 2020, News Corporation announced that it would cease producing seven newspapers even in digital editions from 29 June.

== Publications ==
=== Inner East ===
- Progress Leader (ceased publication June 2020)
- Stonnington Leader (Digital only April 2020)

=== Inner South ===
- Bayside Leader (Digital only April 2020)
- Caulfield Glen Eira/Port Phillip Leader (Digital only April 2020)
- Mordialloc Chelsea Leader (Digital only April 2020)
- Moorabbin Leader (Digital only April 2020)

=== East ===
- Heidelberg Leader (ceased publication June 2020)
- Manningham Leader (ceased publication June 2020)
- Monash Leader (Digital only April 2020)
- Whitehorse Leader (Digital only April 2020)

=== North ===
- Diamond Valley Leader (ceased publication June 2020)
- Melbourne Leader (Digital only April 2020)
- Northcote Leader (ceased publication June 2020)
- Preston Leader (ceased publication June 2020)
- Whittlesea Leader (Digital only April 2020)

=== North West ===
- Northern Leader (Digital only April 2020)
- Moonee Valley Leader (Digital only April 2020) (formerly the Essendon Gazette)
- Moreland Leader (Digital only April 2020)
- Sunbury/Macedon Ranges Leader (ceased publication June 2020)

=== Outer East ===
- Free Press Leader (last edition 29 June 2016)
- Knox Leader (Digital only April 2020)
- Lilydale & Yarra Valley Leader (Digital only April 2020)
- Maroondah Leader (Digital only April 2020)Bus driver

=== South East ===
- Berwick Leader (last edition 28 June 2016)
- Cranbourne Leader (Digital only April 2020)
- Greater Dandenong Leader (Digital only April 2020)
- Frankston Standard Leader (Digital only April 2020)
- Mornington Peninsula Leader (Digital only April 2020)

=== West ===
- Brimbank Leader (last edition 28 June 2016)
- Hobsons Bay Leader (last edition 28 June 2016)
- Maribyrnong Leader (Digital only April 2020)
- Melton Leader (last edition 28 June 2016)
- Wyndham Leader (Digital from June 2020) (previously reported last edition 28 June 2016)

== See also ==
- List of newspapers in Australia
