= T. J. Hollowell =

American football player and coach (born 1981)

Wake Forest Demon Deacons
- Title: Defensive ends coach

Personal information
- Born: April 8, 1981 (age 45); Bethlehem, Pennsylvania, U.S.
- Listed height: 6 ft 0 in (1.83 m)
- Listed weight: 235 lb (107 kg)

Career information
- High school: Copperas Cove (Copperas Cove, Texas)
- College: Nebraska (2000–2003)
- NFL draft: 2004: undrafted

Career history

Playing
- New York Giants (2004); New York Jets (2005); Miami Dolphins (2005); Chicago Bears (2005–2006)*; Denver Broncos (2006–2007); Edmonton Eskimos (2007)
- * Offseason or practice squad member only

Coaching
- Nebraska (2008–2009) Strength & conditioning intern; Nebraska (2010) Defensive intern & linebackers coach; Nebraska (2011–2013) Graduate assistant; Huntsville High School (TX) (2014) Outside linebackers & safeties coach; Youngstown State (2015) Linebackers coach; Santa Margarita Catholic High School (2016–2017) Defensive coordinator, linebackers & safeties coach; Coastal Carolina (2018) Defensive line coach; Coastal Carolina (2019) Defensive ends & outside linebackers coach; Michigan State (2020–2024) Defensive analyst; Nebraska (2024) Football recruiting coordinator; Wake Forest (2025–present) Defensive ends coach

Career NFL statistics
- Games played: 6
- Stats at Pro Football Reference

Thomas Anthony Hollowell (born April 8, 1981) is the current coach for defensive ends at Wake Forest. He was also the defensive ends and outside linebackers for the Coastal Carolina Chanticleers, the linebackers coach for the Youngstown State Penguins under head coach Bo Pelini and before that a graduate assistant coach for the Nebraska Cornhuskers.

Hollowell entered the National Football League in 2004, signing as an undrafted free agent with the New York Giants. He played on special teams for four games with the Giants his rookie season. In 2005, he saw time on the active roster of the New York Jets and the practice rosters of the Giants and the Chicago Bears. He attended Denver Broncos' training camps in 2006 and 2007. He signed with the Edmonton Eskimos of the Canadian Football League on November 16, 2007.
