= Copperas Cove High School =

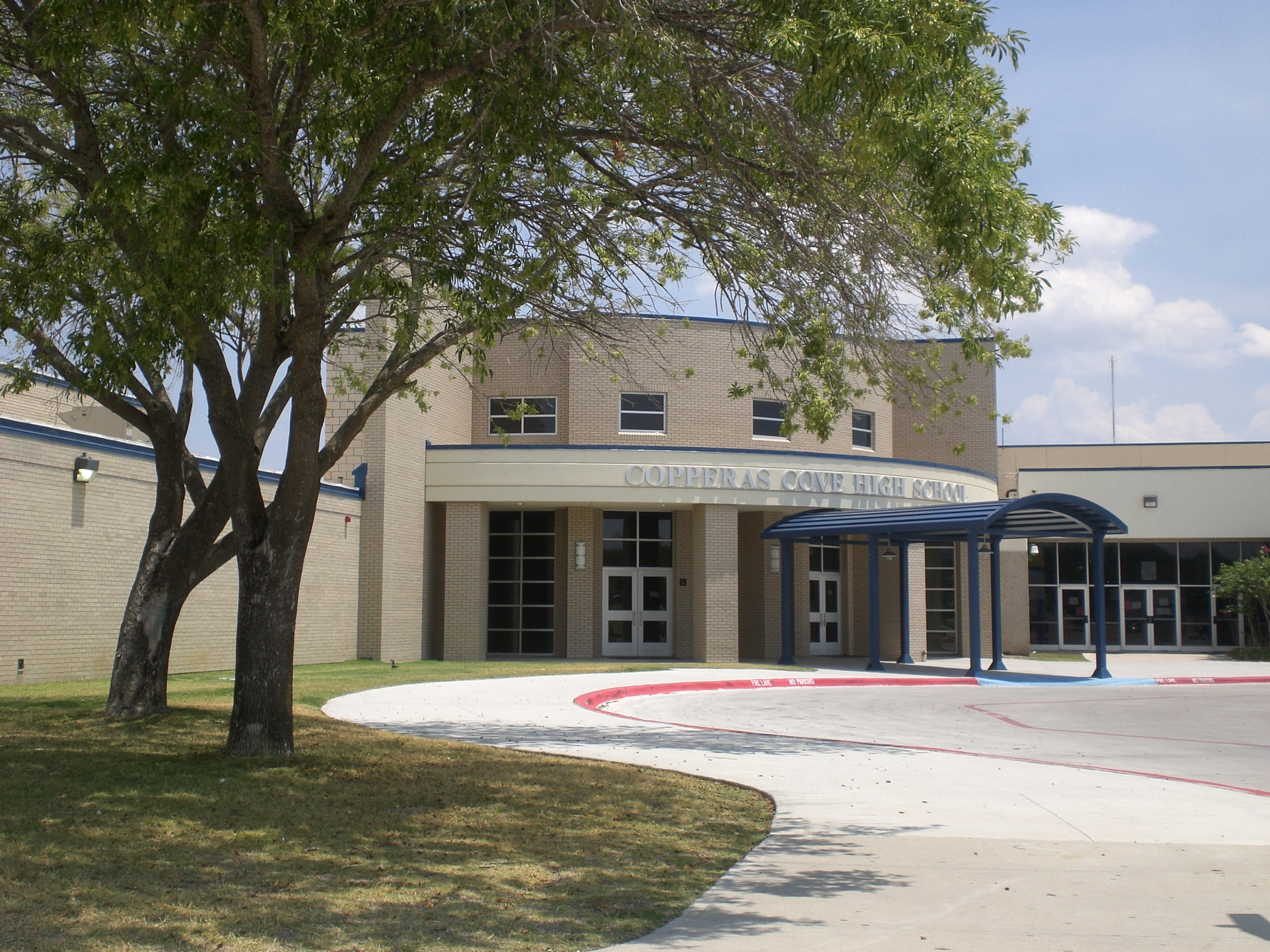

Location
- 423 South 25th Street; Copperas Cove, Texas 76522-0580; United States; 31.1265°N 97.9132°W

Information
- School type: Public high school
- School district: Copperas Cove Independent School District
- Principal: Carlin Grammer
- Staff: 167.06 (FTE)
- Grades: 9–12
- Enrollment: 2,273 (2023–2024)
- Student to teacher ratio: 13.61
- Colors: Royal blue and gold
- Athletics conference: UIL Class AAAAAA
- Mascot: Bulldawg
- Yearbook: Bulger
- Website: cchs.ccisd.com

Copperas Cove High School is a public high school located in the city of Copperas Cove, Texas, United States, and classified as a 6A school by the University Interscholastic League (UIL). It is a part of the Copperas Cove Independent School District located in the southwest corner of Coryell County. In 2015, the school was rated "Met Standard" by the Texas Education Agency.

== Athletics ==
The Copperas Cove Bulldawgs compete in the following sports:

- Baseball
- Basketball
- Cross Country
- Football
- Golf
- Powerlifting
- Soccer
- Softball
- Swimming and Diving
- Tennis
- Track and Field
- Volleyball
- Wrestling

=== State finalist ===
- Football:
  - 2006 (4A/D1), 2007 (4A/D1)

== Notable alumni ==
- Andrea Bordeaux (born 1987), actress, best known for her role as Harley Hidoko in the TV series NCIS: Los Angeles
- Josh Boyce (born 1991), former professional football wide receiver for the New England Patriots of the National Football League (NFL)
- Vontez Duff (born 1982), a former professional football cornerback for the Chicago Bears of the NFL
- Angela M. Eaves (born 1959), Associate Justice of the Supreme Court of Maryland (2022–Present).
- Robert Griffin III (born 1990), former professional football quarterback for the Washington Redskins of the NFL and 2011 Heisman Trophy winner
- T. J. Hollowell (born 1981), current linebackers coach for the Coastal Carolina Chanticleers
- Rashard Odomes (born 1996), basketball player in the Israeli Basketball Premier League
- Michael Stipe (born 1960), lead singer and main lyricist of R.E.M.
- Charles Tillman (born 1981), former professional football cornerback for the Chicago Bears and the Carolina Panthers, both of the NFL
