= Transit Driver Appreciation Day =

Transit Driver Appreciation Day is an annual event to celebrate the public service of public transit vehicle operators. The date of March 18 was selected to commemorate the first bus line, Blaise Pascal's Carrosses à cinq sols in Paris, 1662.

== Observing agencies ==
Transit Operator and Worker Appreciation Day is recognized by transit agencies across North America to celebrate the invaluable contributions of transit professionals. March 18 holds special significance as the day when the first public transit system was launched in France in 1662.

=== Canada ===
- Toronto Transit Commission
- BC Transit
- South Coast British Columbia Transportation Authority
- Brampton Transit
- City of Winnipeg Transit
- Grand River Transit

=== United States ===
- Massachusetts Bay Transportation Authority
- Tri-County Metropolitan Transportation District of Oregon
- King County Metro
- Sun Tran of Tucson, Arizona
- Corpus Christi Regional Transportation Authority
- Hill Country Transit District
- Community Transit
- Topeka Metropolitan Transit Authority
- Bay Area Rapid Transit
- Dallas Area Rapid Transit
- Sacramento Regional Transit
- Regional Metropolitan Transit Authority of Omaha

== History ==
In 2009, Hans Gerwitz and Shannon E. Thomas published a blog post calling for a Bus Driver Appreciation Day. That year it was publicized by local transit-oriented blogs in Seattle, Virginia, and Washington, D.C.

For the 2013 observance, Portland's TriMet established busdriverday.org.

By 2014, TriMet included rail operators by changing the name of Bus Driver Appreciation Day to Transit Driver Appreciation Day. Their site migrated to transitdriverday.org and the Amalgamated Transit Union began publicly observing the day with the new name. This fostered extensive recognition throughout North America.

By 2023, the day was also recognized as "Transit Operator Appreciation Day", "Transit Employee Appreciation Day" and "Transit Operator and Worker Appreciation Day".

== See also ==
- Public transport
- March 18 § Holidays and observances
