= Robert Griffin III =

American football player (born 1990)

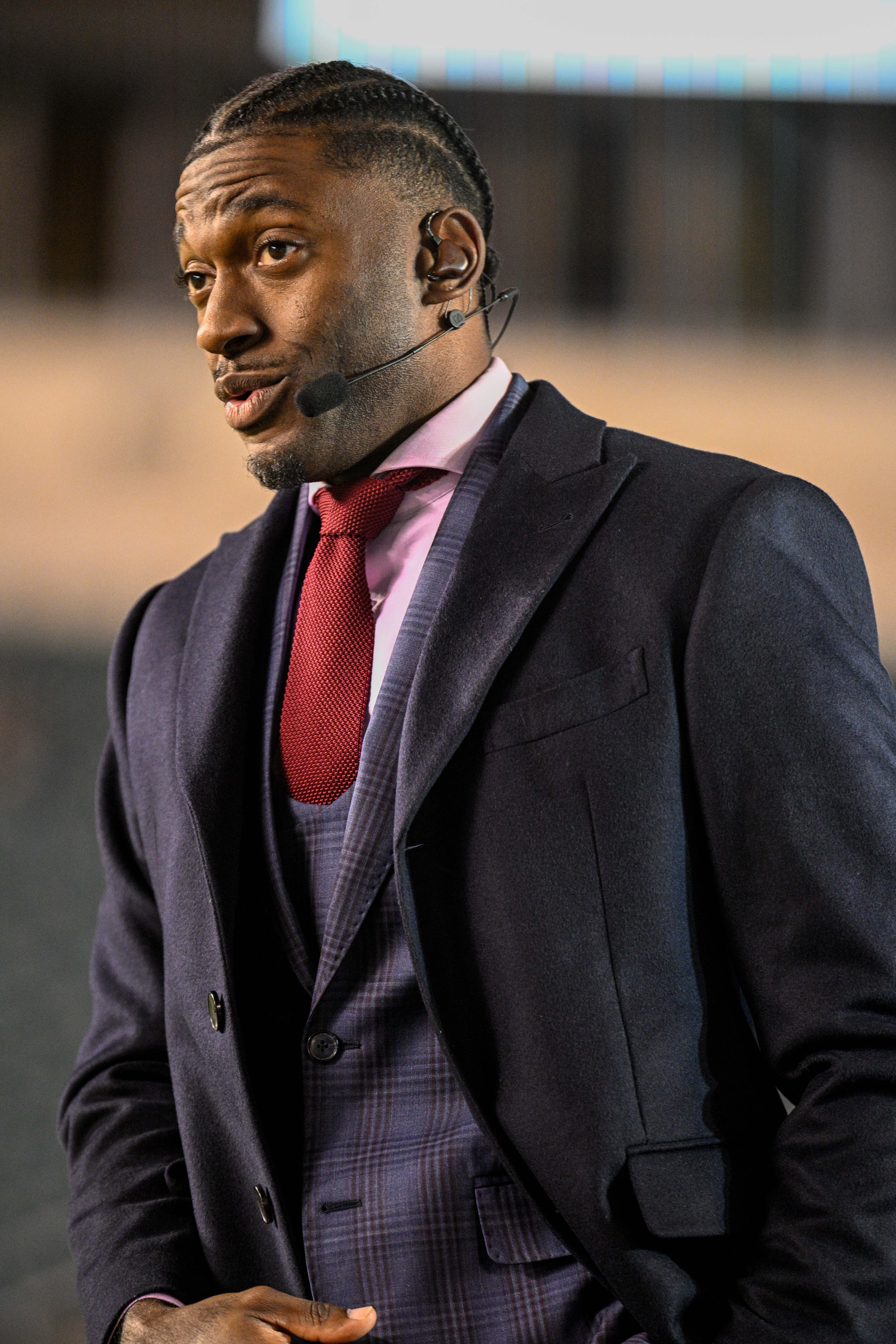
- Griffin in 2022

No. 10, 3
- Position: Quarterback

Personal information
- Born: February 12, 1990 (age 36); Okinawa, Japan
- Listed height: 6 ft 2 in (1.88 m)
- Listed weight: 213 lb (97 kg)

Career information
- High school: Copperas Cove (Copperas Cove, Texas, U.S.)
- College: Baylor (2008–2011)
- NFL draft: 2012: 1st round, 2nd overall pick

Career history
- Washington Redskins (2012–2015); Cleveland Browns (2016); Baltimore Ravens (2018–2020)

Awards and highlights
- Pro Bowl (2012); NFL Offensive Rookie of the Year (2012); Heisman Trophy (2011)

Career NFL statistics
- Passing attempts: 1,268
- Passing completions: 799
- Completion percentage: 63.0%
- TD–INT: 43–30
- Passing yards: 9,271
- Passer rating: 86.5
- Rushing yards: 1,809
- Rushing touchdowns: 10
- Stats at Pro Football Reference

Robert Lee Griffin III (born February 12, 1990), nicknamed RGIII or RG3, is an American former professional football quarterback and current college football game analyst and color commentator for Fox Sports. Griffin played in the National Football League (NFL) for eight seasons, most notably with the Washington Redskins. Griffin played college football for the Baylor Bears, winning the Heisman Trophy in 2011. He was selected second overall by the Redskins in the 2012 NFL draft.

Griffin set league records for the highest rookie passer rating and touchdown–interception ratio, while leading the Redskins to their first division title since 1999, earning him Offensive Rookie of the Year and Pro Bowl honors. Following a severe knee injury he suffered in the playoffs, Griffin was unable to match his early success and lost his starting position in 2015 to Kirk Cousins. He signed with the Cleveland Browns in 2016, but his tenure was also afflicted by injuries, resulting in his release at the end of the season. After a year in free agency, he joined the Baltimore Ravens in 2018 and played his last three seasons as a backup.

== Early life and background ==
Griffin was born in Okinawa, Japan, where his parents, Robert Griffin Jr. and Jacqueline, both U.S. Army sergeants, were stationed. The family later lived at Fort Lewis near Tacoma, Washington, and then moved to New Orleans, Louisiana. They finally settled in Copperas Cove, Texas in 1997 after retiring from the military.

Griffin's paternal grandfather, Robert Griffin Sr., was a foreman for a New Orleans construction company. He suffered from glaucoma for several years, and died in 1984 at age 43 from a brain aneurysm. Financial hardship caused the family to move to the Desire Projects neighborhood. Griffin's father was a basketball player at Kennedy High School and enlisted in the Army before he graduated. He met his wife Jacqueline (née Ross) while stationed in Fort Carson, Colorado.

=== High school ===
Griffin attended Copperas Cove High School in Texas, where he was a three-sport star in basketball, football, and track for the Bulldawgs. He started at quarterback for two seasons. During his junior season, he passed for 2,001 yards and 25 touchdowns with 2 interceptions, while compiling 876 rushing yards for 8 touchdowns. He received first-team All-District 16-4A honors after the season. As a senior, he recorded 1,285 rushing yards, posting 24 touchdowns, and passed for 1,356 yards for 16 touchdowns with 7 interceptions. In his senior season Copperas Cove finished with a record of 13–2, but lost in the championship game of the 2007 Class 4A Division I state playoffs. Over the two seasons, he rushed for a total of 2,161 yards and 32 touchdowns while passing for 3,357 yards and 41 touchdowns with 9 interceptions. He went to and lost 2 state championships.

=== Track ===
In track, Griffin broke Texas state records for the 110-meter and 300-meter hurdles. He ran the 110-meter hurdles in 13.55 seconds and the 300-meter hurdles in 35.33 seconds. The 300 hurdles time was 1/100 of a second short of tying the national high school record at the time. He was also a gold medalist in the 110- and 400-meter hurdles on the AAU track and field circuit. In 2007, as a junior, he was rated the No. 1 high school 400-meter intermediate hurdler in the country, and was tied at No. 1 for the 110-meter sprint hurdler in the nation. His personal best in the 110-meter hurdles, 13.46 sec, ranked fifth in the world among junior athletes in 2007 (behind Artur Noga, Ryan Brathwaite, Johnny Dutch, and Vladimir Zhukov), while his best 2007 time in the 400-meter hurdles, 49.56 sec—his personal best until 2008—led all juniors worldwide for that year. Also as a junior, Griffin received the Gatorade Texas Boys Track and Field Athlete of the Year award, and was named to USA Today′s 2007 All-USA Track and Field team. His personal best in the 400-meter hurdles was achieved on May 18, 2008, with a time of 49.22 seconds.

Personal bests
Event	Time (seconds)	Venue	Date
110-meter hurdles	13.46	Knoxville, Tennessee	August 2, 2007
300-meter hurdles	35.33	Austin, Texas	May 11, 2007
400-meter hurdles	49.22	Boulder, Colorado	May 18, 2008

=== College recruitment ===
Rivals.com, a college football recruiting service, ranked Griffin the fourth-best dual-threat quarterback in the nation and the 42nd-best player in Texas in the high school prospect class of 2008. During the college recruiting period, Griffin was pursued by Stanford, Tennessee, Kansas, Nebraska, Houston, Tulsa, Illinois, Washington State, and Oregon. Griffin initially committed to play for Houston under head coach Art Briles. When Briles left Houston to take the head coaching position at Baylor, Griffin switched his commitment and eventually signed a letter of intent to play for Baylor, in part because the university also had a top track and field program.

College recruiting
Name	Hometown	School	Height	Weight	40^{‡}	Commit date
Robert Griffin; QB	Copperas Cove, Texas	Copperas Cove HS	6 ft 3 in (1.91 m)	195 lb (88 kg)	4.4	Dec 3, 2007
Robert Griffin; QB	Recruit ratings: Scout: Rivals: (77)					
Overall recruit ranking: Scout: 12 (QB) Rivals: 4 (Dual-threat QB) ESPN: 40 (QB)
Note: In many cases, Scout, Rivals, 247Sports, On3, and ESPN may conflict in their listings of height and weight.; In these cases, the average was taken. ESPN grades are on a 100-point scale.; Sources: "Baylor Football Commitments". Rivals.; "2008 Baylor Football Commits". Scout.; "ESPN". ESPN.; "Scout.com Team Recruiting Rankings". Scout.; "2008 Team Ranking". Rivals.com.

== College career ==
Griffin graduated from high school a semester early, after serving as class president and ranking seventh in his class. He began attending Baylor University during the spring 2008 semester when he was 17 years old. As a member of Baylor's track and field team, Griffin finished in first place in the 400-meter hurdles at both the Big 12 Conference Championship and the NCAA Midwest Regional Championship meets; he also broke the NCAA Midwest Regional 400-meter hurdles record. He placed third in the NCAA meet and also participated in the U.S. Olympic Trials, in which he advanced to the semifinals. Griffin graduated in three years with a bachelor's degree in political science and a 3.67 GPA, while appearing on the dean's list twice. During his final year of college sports eligibility, he was studying for a master's degree in communications. In 2011, Griffin was named an Arthur Ashe, Jr. Sports Scholar by Diverse: Issues In Higher Education.

=== 2008 season ===
As a true freshman playing for the Bears, Griffin earned Big 12 Conference Offensive Freshman of the Year honors. He started 11 of 12 games his freshman season. He made his collegiate debut in a loss to Wake Forest, where he was 11 of 19 for 125 passing yards and had 29 rushing yards and a rushing touchdown. In the upset 41–21 victory over the Texas A&M Aggies, he recorded 13 of 23 passes for 241 yards and two touchdowns. Griffin garnered Big 12 Freshman of the Year honors from the league's coaches (who are not allowed to vote for their own players) as well as the media.

The team finished the season with a 4–8 record (2–6 Big 12).

=== 2009 season ===
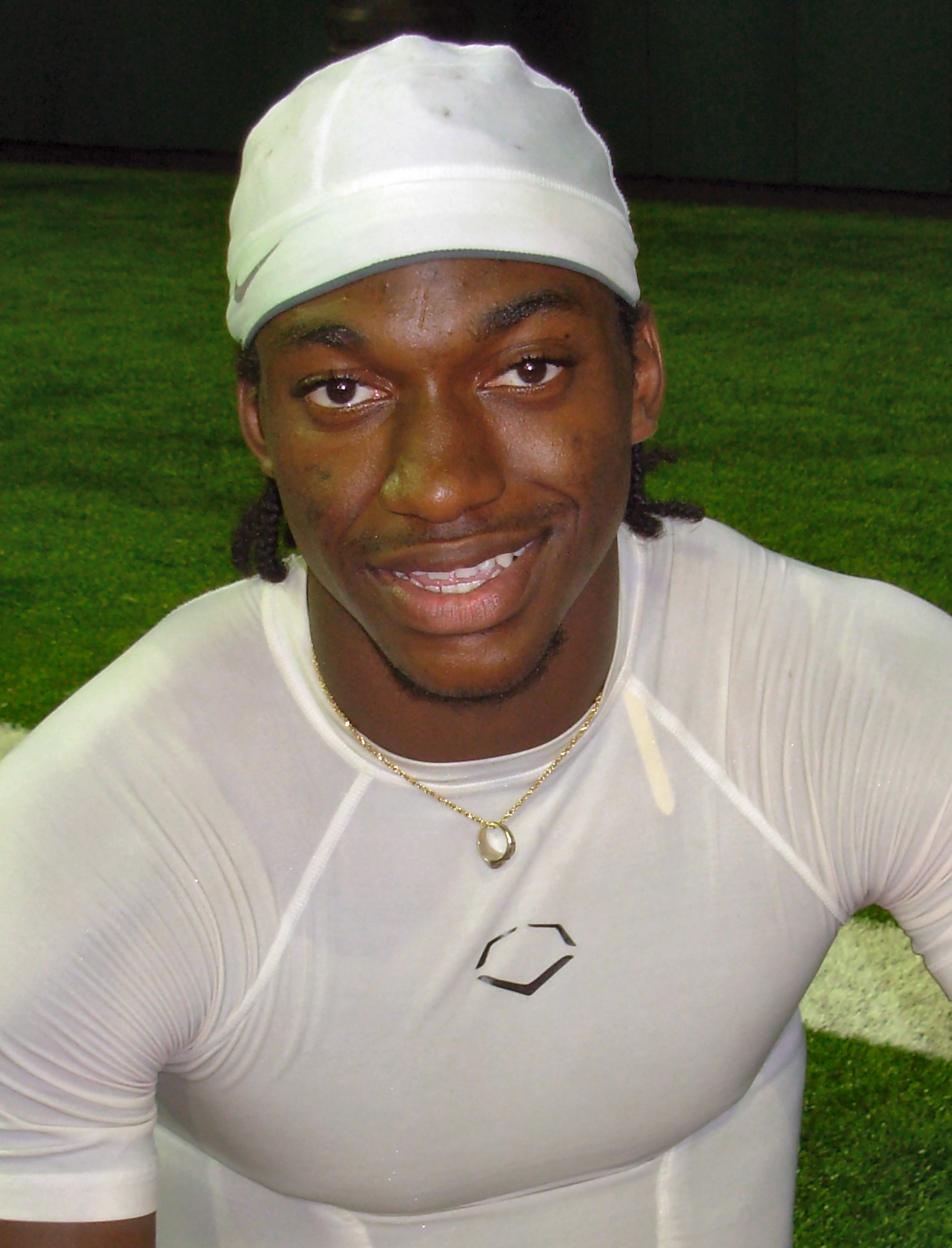
Griffin in 2009

Griffin sat out for the remainder of the 2009 season after sustaining an isolated tear to his ACL in the first half of the third game against Northwestern State.

Baylor finished the season with a 4–8 record (1–7 Big 12).

=== 2010 season ===
Griffin was granted redshirt status so he entered the 2010 season as a sophomore. According to the bylaws, players who are injured after playing less than 30 percent of the season may be eligible (Griffin was injured during the third game of the 2009 season, with 25 percent of the season completed). Overall, he finished the season with 3,501 passing yards, 22 passing touchdowns, eight interceptions, and had 149 rushes for 635 rushing yards and eight rushing touchdowns.

Baylor finished the season with a 7–6 record (4–4 Big 12).

=== 2011 season ===
Coming into the 2011 season, the Baylor Bears were not expected to do well, being picked 6th in the Big 12 preseason poll. The Bears opened the season against 15th-ranked TCU. The Bears took a 47–23 lead into the 4th quarter, and were able to fight off a comeback after the Horned Frogs gained the lead 48–47 briefly, only for Baylor to kick the game-winning field goal and win 50–48. They pulled off the upset in large part due to Griffin's performance; he passed for 359 yards, with 5 touchdowns and a 77.8% completion percentage. On the game-winning drive, Griffin also caught a key pass. Following the win, Baylor entered the AP Poll rankings for only the third time in the previous 15 seasons, at 20th, and Griffin was considered by many to be a Heisman Trophy candidate. After a bye week, Baylor shut out Stephen F. Austin State University 48–0, and Griffin went 20 of 22 (90.9%) for 247 yards and three touchdowns and ran for 78 yards. In week 4, Griffin ushered Baylor to their third win, beating Rice University 56–31; Griffin completed 29 of 33 passes (87.9%) for 338 yards with 51 yards rushing and a touchdown. In week five against Kansas State, Griffin almost brought the Bears to their fourth win, going 23 out of 31 (74.2%) for 346 yards and 5 touchdowns with only 1 interception, but they lost 36–35 to the Wildcats. In week six against Iowa State, Griffin took Baylor to Iowa for their fourth win, completing 22 out of 30 (73.3%) for 212 yards, 1 touchdown, and no interceptions. He won the Heisman Trophy, becoming the first player from Baylor to win it. Griffin also led Baylor to a 10–3 record, including a 67–56 win over the Washington Huskies in the Alamo Bowl. With a combined 123 points, it stands as the highest-scoring regulation bowl game in NCAA history. Due to the Alamo Bowl, Griffin became the first player since Tim Tebow in 2007 to win the Heisman and not appear in the National Championship (#1 LSU faced #2 Alabama). Overall, he finished the 2011 season with 4,293 passing yards, 37 passing touchdowns, and six interceptions to go along with 179 rushes for 699 rushing yards and ten rushing touchdowns.

Griffin, who graduated with a Bachelor of Arts degree in political science with a 3.67 grade point average in December 2010, began pursuing a Master's in communications in 2011. On January 11, 2012, Griffin announced his intention to enter the 2012 NFL draft.

== Professional career ==
=== Pre-draft ===
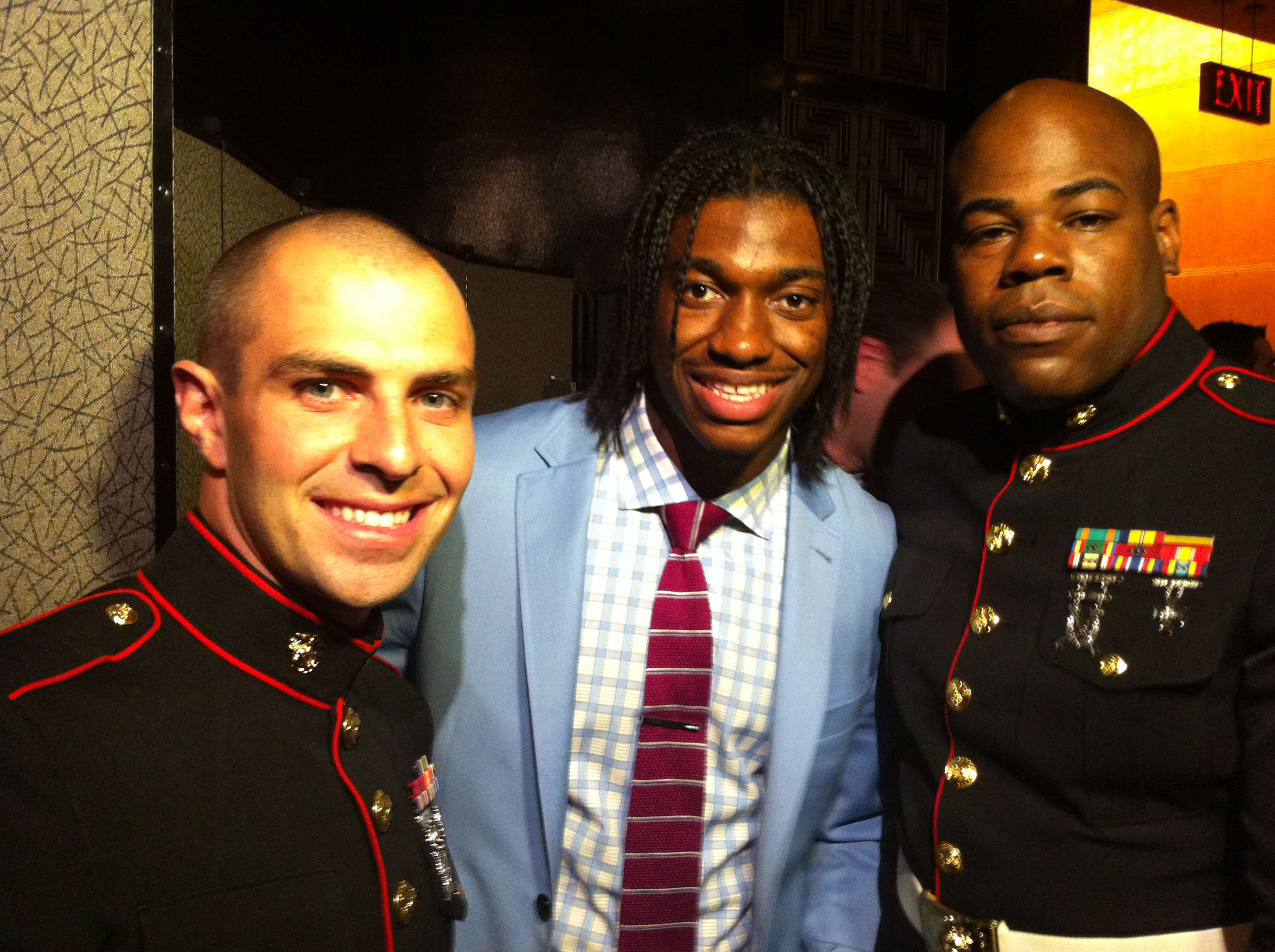
Griffin (center) posing with two Marines at the 2012 NFL draft.

Pre-draft measurables
Height	Weight	Arm length	Hand span	Wingspan	40-yard dash	10-yard split	20-yard split	Vertical jump	Broad jump	Wonderlic
6 ft 2 3/8 in (1.89 m)	223 lb (101 kg)	32 1/4 in (0.82 m)	9 1/2 in (0.24 m)	6 ft 5 3/4 in (1.97 m)	4.41 s	1.53 s	2.58 s	39.0 in (0.99 m)	10 ft 0 in (3.05 m)	24
All values from NFL Combine

Griffin was not perceived as a first-round draft pick prior to his junior season. By midseason, however, he had drawn the attention of NFL scouts and analysts, and some started projecting he would be an early first round selection. Towards the end of his junior season, Griffin had established himself as the No. 2 quarterback prospect for the 2012 NFL draft, behind the unanimous first pick projection Andrew Luck.

Griffin was widely projected to be the No. 2 pick of the draft, but the St. Louis Rams—the team originally holding the pick—had already selected Sam Bradford to be their long-term starting quarterback with the No. 1 overall pick in the 2010 NFL draft. Wanting to stick with Bradford, the Rams decided to deal the pick prior to the draft, with the Cleveland Browns and Washington Redskins perceived as the most interested bidders. After a brief bidding process, the Redskins acquired the pick by giving the Rams four high-value draft picks over three years: their first-round picks in 2012 (No.6 overall), 2013 (No.22 overall), and 2014 (No.2 overall), as well as their second-round pick (No.39 overall) in 2012.

=== Washington Redskins ===
==== 2012 season ====
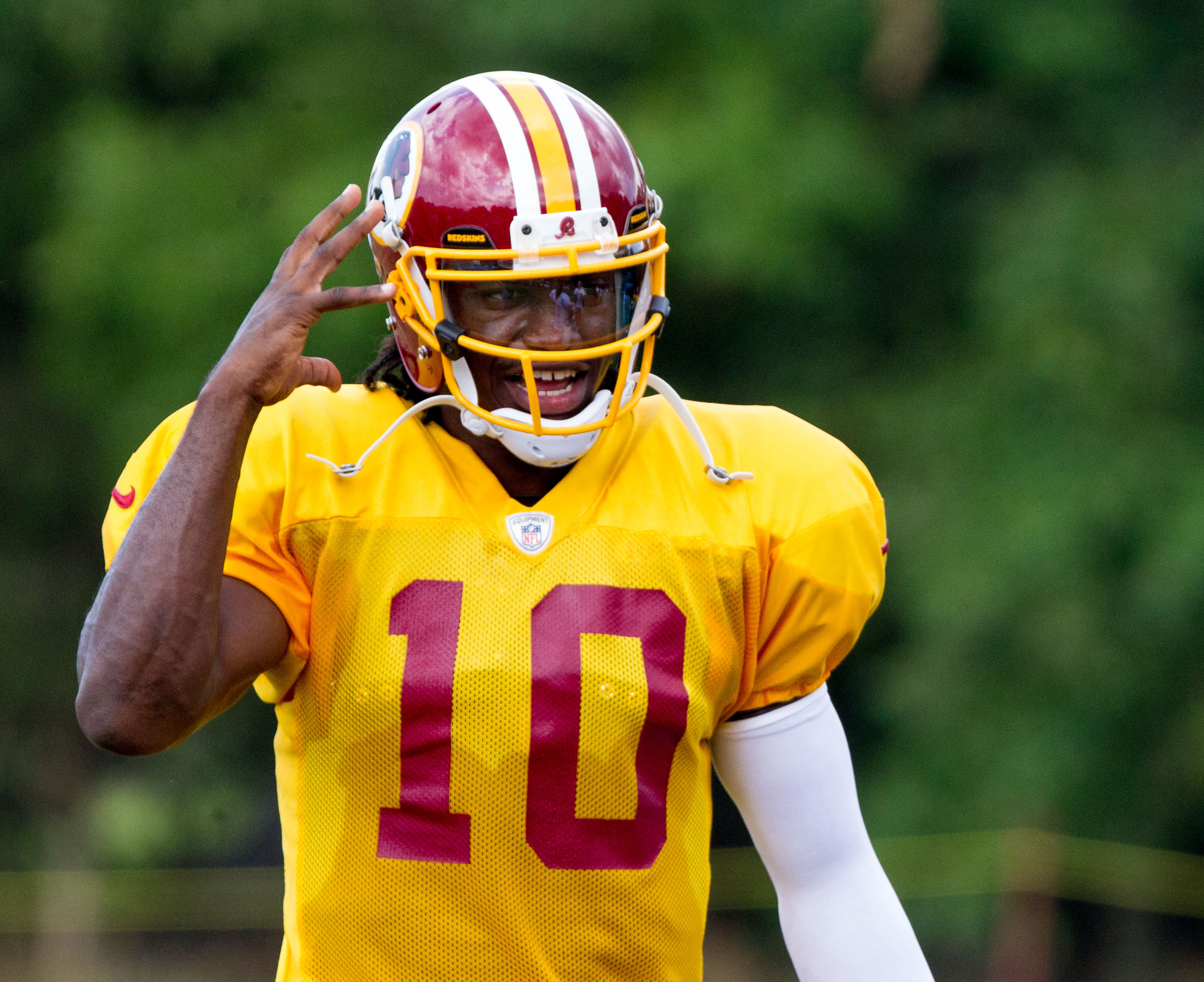
Griffin during Redskins training camp in 2012

As expected, the Redskins selected Griffin as the second overall pick, making him the second Baylor Bear to be drafted that high in four years (after Jason Smith in 2009), but the first Baylor quarterback to be chosen second overall since Adrian Burk in 1950.

Griffin wore number 10 for the Redskins, with "Griffin III" on the back of his jersey. This made him the first player in the history of the "Big Four" professional sports leagues (NFL, MLB, NHL, and NBA) to have a Roman numeral on the back of his jersey, as the NFL changed the rule in 2012 to allow players to include generational titles in their names. Griffin previously had "Griffin III" on the back of his jersey while in college, which was necessary in order to distinguish him from the other Robert Griffin on the Baylor team. On July 18, 2012, the Redskins signed him to a four-year, $21.1 million contract with a $13.8 million signing bonus.

On September 9, 2012, Griffin became the NFL's first starting quarterback who was born in the 1990s. In his debut as a starting quarterback in the NFL, Griffin opened the Redskins' season by completing 19 of 26 passes for 320 yards and two touchdowns while adding 10 carries for 42 rushing yards in a 40–32 victory over the New Orleans Saints. He was named NFC Offensive Player of the Week for his performance – the first time in NFL history that a rookie quarterback has been given that honor for his debut game. Griffin's debut performance was further rewarded after he was named NFL Rookie of the Week, and he was given that honor once again after the Redskins' win over the Tampa Bay Buccaneers in Week 4. On October 4, he was named September's NFL Offensive Rookie of the Month. The next week against the Atlanta Falcons, he left the game late in the third quarter after suffering a mild concussion after receiving a blow to the head by Sean Weatherspoon. He was cleared to play in the next game against the Minnesota Vikings, where he had another impressive performance that included a 76-yard rushing touchdown. The Redskins ended their home-game losing streak and Griffin was named NFL Rookie of the Week for a third time.

On November 14 during the Redskins' bye week, the team voted Griffin an offensive co-captain. Following the Redskins' 31–6 victory against the Philadelphia Eagles, he was named NFC Offensive Player of the Week for a second time. Griffin's performance – passing for 200 yards with 4 touchdowns, rushing for an additional 84 yards, and finishing with a perfect 158.3 passer rating – made him the first rookie in NFL history to pass for 200 yards, pass for 4 touchdowns and rush for more than 75 yards in a single game. Along with that achievement, his performance against the Eagles made him the youngest player in NFL history, at 22 years and 284 days old, to achieve a perfect passer rating in a game. This record stood until 2015 when Tennessee Titans quarterback Marcus Mariota threw for a perfect passer rating at 21 years and 318 days old in his debut.

In the Week 14 game against the Baltimore Ravens on December 9, the Redskins would suffer another injury scare when defensive end Haloti Ngata hit Griffin directly at his right knee, twisting it in the process. On the final drive of the fourth quarter, Griffin was tackled after rushing for 13 yards and hopped on one leg for several plays before leaving the game. Backup quarterback Kirk Cousins would come in the game and lead the Redskins to a 31–28, overtime victory. The next day it was confirmed that Griffin had sustained a Grade 1 LCL sprain. It was decided that Griffin would sit out the next game against the Browns to give him more time to heal and avoid the chance of further injuries. He returned the next game and led the Redskins to another victory over the Eagles in Week 16. The knee injury emerged as a controversy on January 6, the day the Redskins faced the Seattle Seahawks in the NFC wild card game, when USA Today reported that – contrary to a previous statement made by head coach Mike Shanahan – Dr. James Andrews had not cleared Griffin to return for the post-injury plays in the December 9 game. Griffin then re-injured his knee in the wild card loss to the Seahawks. Griffin underwent surgery on January 9 and both his LCL and ACL were repaired.

For the season, Griffin set records for highest passer rating by a rookie quarterback (102.4) and highest touchdown to interception ratio (4:1) (both since broken by Dak Prescott). Aside from the week 15 game against the Cleveland Browns where he did not play, Griffin played a vital role in helping the Redskins finish the regular season on a 7-game winning streak after starting the season 3–6, leading the team to its first playoff appearance since the 2007 season.

On December 26, Griffin was named to enter the 2013 Pro Bowl in recognition of his successful rookie season. Due to injuries on his ACL and LCL ligaments in his right knee, he was negated from the Pro Bowl roster and replaced by Drew Brees. Griffin also won the 2012 NFL Offensive Rookie of the Year award. He was named to the PFWA All-Rookie Team, becoming the second Redskins quarterback to receive this award, joining Heath Shuler in 1994. Griffin was ranked 15th by his fellow players on the NFL Top 100 Players of 2013.

==== 2013 season ====
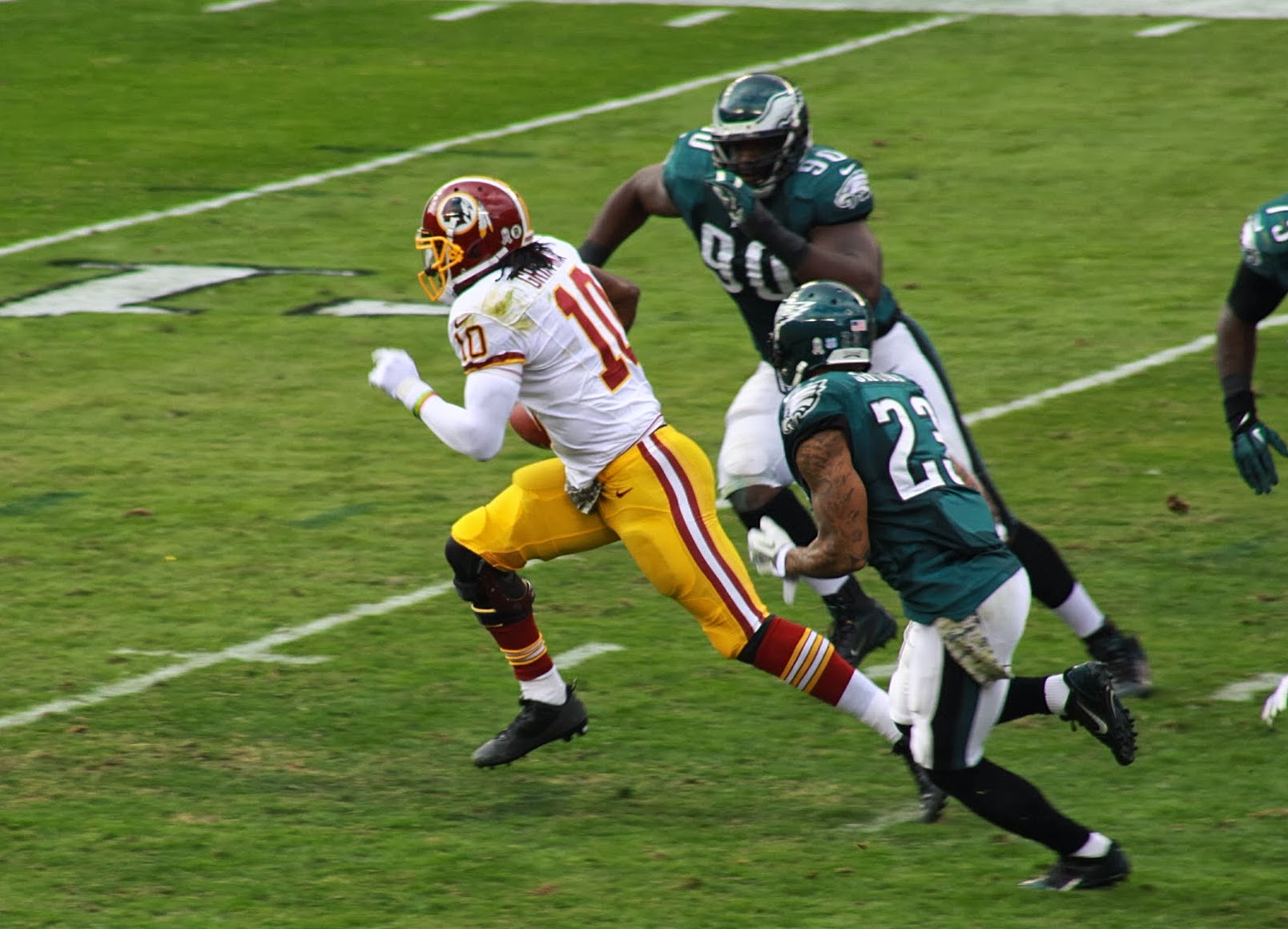
Griffin on a read-option run during a game against the Eagles in 2013

After some controversy over whether Griffin would be ready for the season opener (he did not play a single preseason game), he debuted in the loss to Philadelphia Eagles. Griffin failed to replicate his 2012 success during the first half of the 2013 season and remained statistically below expectations until Washington's Week 7 game against the Chicago Bears. Leading the Redskins to a 45–41 victory, Griffin recorded 298 passing yards and two touchdowns, including a 45-yard touchdown pass to Aldrick Robinson. The Redskins' 27–6 loss against the San Francisco 49ers in Week 12 was the first game in Griffin's collegiate and professional career where he failed to score a single offensive touchdown. On December 11, head coach Mike Shanahan announced that Griffin would be inactive for the last three games of the season and that Kirk Cousins would finish the season as the starter. He claimed that it was done in order to eliminate risk of further injury to Griffin. He finished the 2013 season with 3,203 passing yards, 16 passing touchdowns, and 12 interceptions to go along with 86 carries for 489 rushing yards and no touchdowns.

==== 2014 season ====
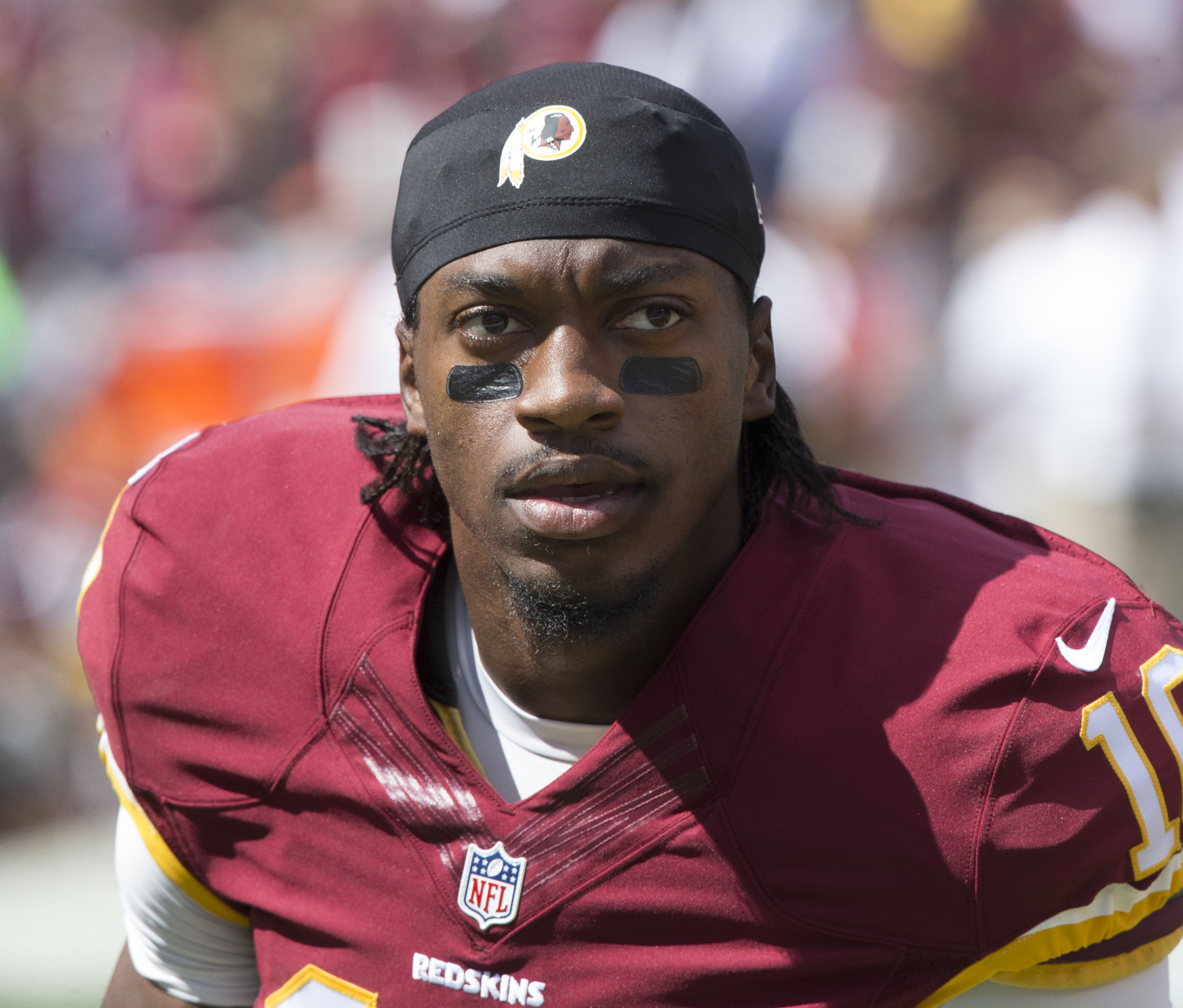
Griffin in 2014

On September 14, 2014, in Week 2 against the Jacksonville Jaguars, Griffin was carted off the field after suffering a dislocated left ankle. X-rays and MRIs revealed no fractures in the ankle. On October 29, it was reported that Griffin was set to return against the Minnesota Vikings in week 9. The Redskins then dropped their next three games, falling to the Vikings, Buccaneers, and 49ers. On November 25, it was reported that Griffin would be benched for Colt McCoy, heading into Sunday's game against the Indianapolis Colts. After McCoy went down with a neck injury against the New York Giants, Griffin came in and looked impressive in a loss to the Giants, throwing for 236 yards and 1 touchdown passing. Griffin was named the starter for the rest of the year when the Redskins put Colt McCoy on injured reserve. Griffin responded to that with a winning performance in a 27–24 victory over the Eagles. He threw for 220 yards and had one interception. In the final game of the year against the Cowboys, Griffin showed signs of his rookie year form. He threw for a season-high 336 yards and had 2 touchdowns (one passing, one rushing) in a 44–17 loss. Griffin was 2–5 as a starter in 2014 and the Redskins finished 4–12 and last place in the NFC East.

==== 2015 season ====
During Week 2 of preseason in a win over the Detroit Lions, Griffin fumbled the ball and recovered it but had a defensive lineman fall on top of him. Griffin suffered a concussion in the process and was questionable for the next game against the Ravens. Griffin was medically cleared for the game by a physician, but a few days later the same physician declared Griffin not ready for the game, thus giving backup Kirk Cousins the start. After the win over the Ravens, Cousins was named the starter for the regular-season opener and onward.

On September 13, 2015, it was reported that Griffin was practicing as a safety with the scout team. He ended up third on the quarterback depth chart, behind Cousins and Colt McCoy, and remained inactive for the entire regular season.

On March 7, 2016, Griffin was released by the Redskins.

=== Cleveland Browns ===
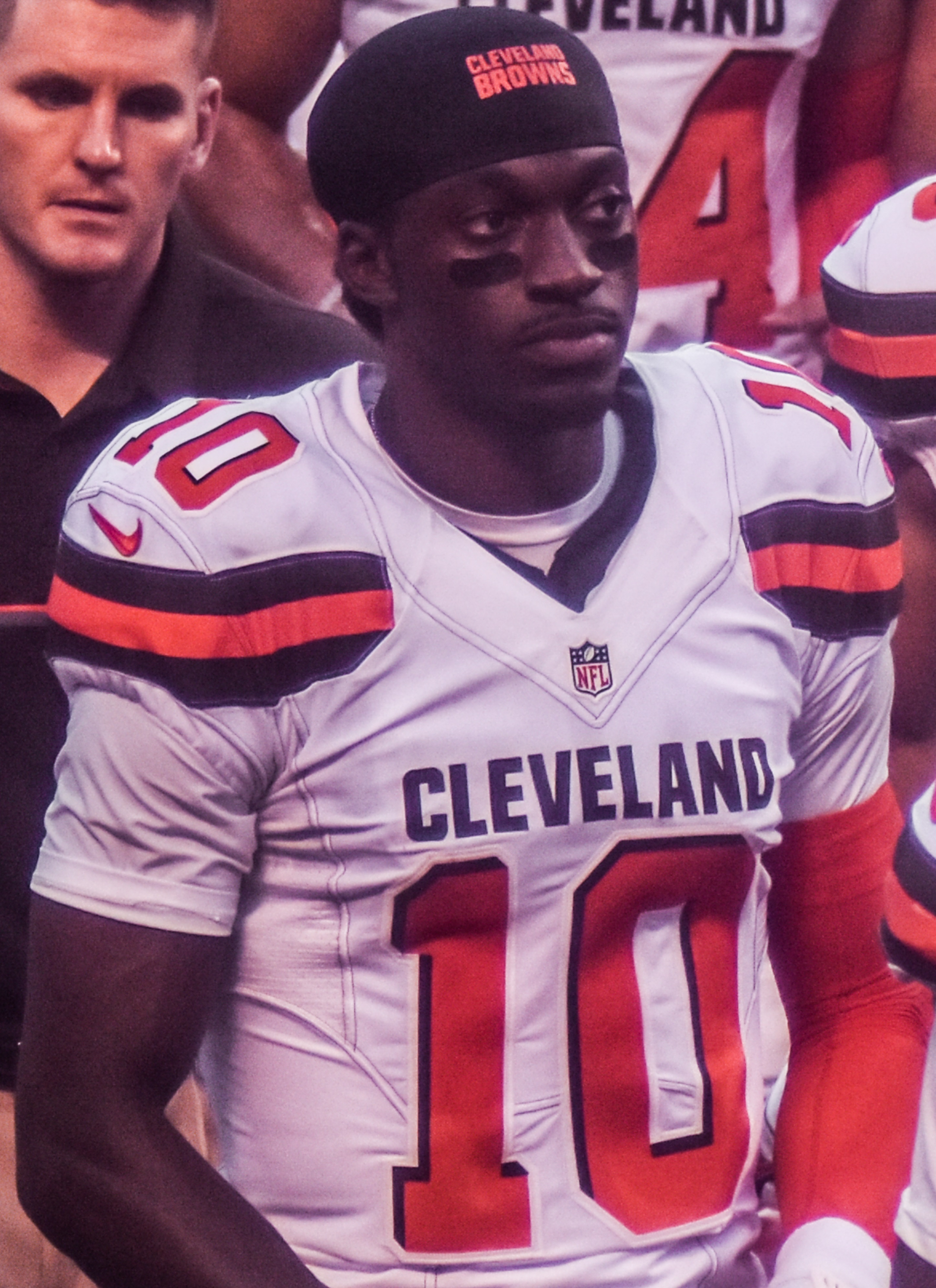
Griffin with the Browns in 2016

On March 24, 2016, Griffin signed a two-year, $15.1 million contract with the Browns. On August 8, 2016, Browns head coach Hue Jackson named Griffin the team's starting quarterback for the 2016 season. Griffin was placed on injured reserve on September 12, after suffering a shoulder injury in the Browns' season opening loss to the Philadelphia Eagles. He was activated off injured reserve on December 9, 2016, prior to Week 14 against the Bengals. Griffin played in five games, all starts, in 2016, completing 87-of-147 passes for 886 yards with two touchdowns and three interceptions. He also rushed for 190 yards and two touchdowns.

On March 10, 2017, Griffin was released by the Browns.

=== Baltimore Ravens ===
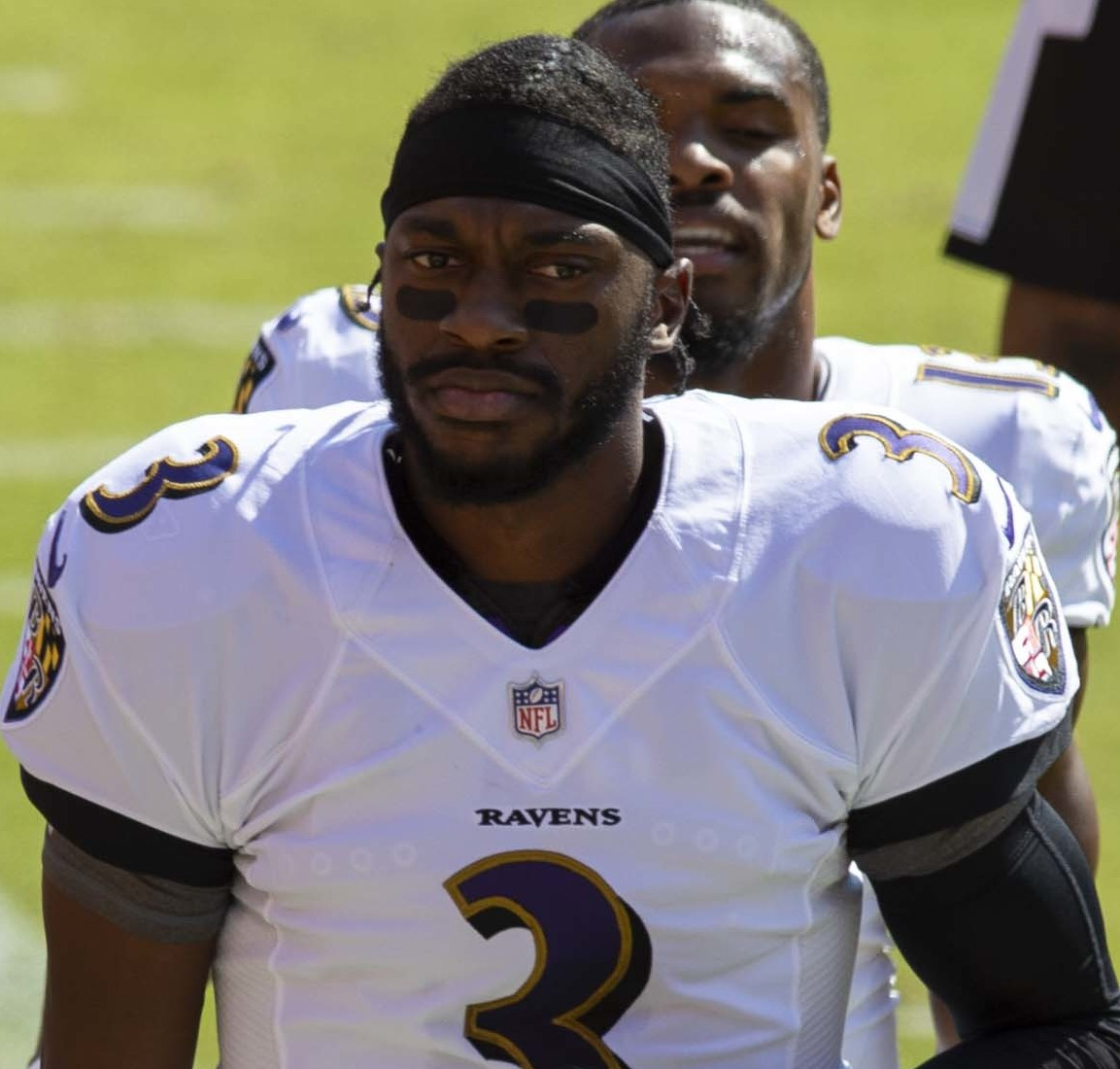
Griffin with the Baltimore Ravens, 2020

After remaining a free agent for all of 2017, Griffin signed a one-year contract with the Baltimore Ravens on April 4, 2018. On September 2, 2018, Griffin was named the team's second-string quarterback behind starter Joe Flacco to begin the season. He was later passed over on the depth chart by rookie Lamar Jackson. Griffin appeared in three games during the 2018 season, completing two of six passes for 21 yards.

On March 21, 2019, Griffin re-signed with the Ravens on a two-year contract. On July 28, 2019, Griffin suffered a fractured thumb and was expected to miss 4–8 weeks. Griffin returned in time for the September 8, 2019, regular-season opener against the Miami Dolphins, where Griffin came into the game in relief of Lamar Jackson toward the end of the 59–10 victory. He completed all six pass attempts for 55 yards and one touchdown. In the Week 10 game against the Cincinnati Bengals, Griffin entered the game as a running back alongside Mark Ingram II and Jackson in the backfield, marking what was likely the first time in NFL history three former Heisman Trophy winners lined up together in a backfield. In Week 17 against the Pittsburgh Steelers, Griffin made his first start since the 2016 season because the Ravens secured the top seed in the AFC playoffs and sat their starters as a result. During the game, Griffin threw for 96 yards and an interception and rushed for 50 yards during the 28–10 win.

Griffin was named the starter for the Ravens Week 12 matchup against the Steelers due to Lamar Jackson testing positive for COVID-19. He injured his left hamstring late in the second quarter of the game, but remained in until the fourth quarter, when he was sidelined and replaced by Trace McSorley. He finished the game 7–12 for 33 yards and an interception (which was returned for a touchdown by former Browns teammate Joe Haden) along with seven rushes for 68 yards during the 19–14 loss. He was placed on injured reserve on December 4, 2020. Griffin was waived by the Ravens on January 18, 2021.

== Career statistics ==
Legend
**Bold**	Career high

=== NFL ===
==== Regular season ====
Year	Team	Games			Passing									Rushing					Sacks		Fumbles	
Year	Team	GP	GS	Record	Cmp	Att	Pct	Yds	Y/A	Lng	TD	Int	Rtg	Att	Yds	Avg	Lng	TD	Sck	SckY	Fum	Lost
2012	WAS	15	15	**9–6**	258	393	65.6	3,200	**8.1**	**88**	**20**	5	**102.4**	**120**	**815**	**6.8**	**76**	**7**	30	217	**12**	2
2013	WAS	13	13	3–10	**274**	**456**	60.1	**3,203**	7.0	62	16	**12**	82.2	86	489	5.7	26	0	**38**	**274**	11	**4**
2014	WAS	9	7	2–5	147	214	**68.6**	1,694	7.9	69	4	6	86.9	38	176	4.6	23	1	33	227	9	**4**
2015	WAS	0	0	Did not play																		
2016	CLE	5	5	1–4	87	147	59.2	886	6.0	58	2	3	72.5	31	190	6.1	20	2	22	138	4	1
2018	BAL	3	0	—	2	6	33.3	21	3.5	14	0	0	44.4	0	0	0.0	20	0	0	0	0	0
2019	BAL	7	1	1–0	23	38	60.5	225	5.9	39	1	2	64.0	20	70	3.5	16	0	5	19	0	0
2020	BAL	4	1	0–1	8	14	57.1	42	3.0	9	0	2	22.6	12	69	5.8	39	0	3	20	1	1
Total		56	42	16–26	799	1,268	63.0	9,271	7.3	88	43	30	86.5	307	1,809	5.9	76	10	131	895	37	12

==== Postseason ====
Year	Team	Games			Passing									Rushing					Sacks		Fumbles	
Year	Team	GP	GS	Record	Cmp	Att	Pct	Yds	Y/A	Lng	TD	Int	Rtg	Att	Yds	Avg	Lng	TD	Sck	SckY	Fum	Lost
2012	WAS	1	1	0–1	10	19	52.6	84	4.4	30	2	1	77.5	5	21	4.2	9	0	2	16	1	1
2015	WAS	0	0	Did not play																		
2018	BAL	0	0	Did not play																		
2019	BAL	0	0	Did not play																		
2020	BAL	0	0	Did not play																		
Total		1	1	0–1	10	19	52.6	84	4.4		2	1	77.5	5	21	4.2		0	2	16	1	1

=== College ===
Year	Team	Games			Passing							Rushing					Receiving				Punting				Total Yards
Year	Team	GP	GS	Record	Cmp	Att	Pct	Yds	TD	Int	Rtg	Att	Yds	Avg	Lng	TD	Rec	Yds	Avg	TD	Pun	Yds	Avg	Lng	Total Yards
2008	Baylor	12	11	4–7	160	267	59.9	2,091	15	3	142.0	173	**843**	**4.9**	63	**13**	**1**	0	0.0	0	—	—	—	—	2,934
2009	Baylor	3	3	2–1	45	69	65.2	481	4	0	142.9	27	77	2.9	17	2	—	—	—	—	1	59	**59.0**	**59**	558
2010	Baylor	13	13	7–6	**304**	**454**	67.0	3,501	22	**8**	144.2	149	635	4.3	**71**	8	**1**	9	9.0	0	—	—	—	—	4,145
2011	Baylor	13	13	**10–3**	291	402	**72.4**	**4,293**	**37**	6	**189.5**	**179**	699	3.9	49	10	**1**	**15**	**15.0**	0	**3**	**99**	33.0	39	**5,007**
Career		41	40	23–17	800	1,192	67.1	10,366	78	17	158.9	528	2,254	4.3	71	33	3	24	8.0	0	4	158	39.5	59	12,644

== Career highlights ==
=== Awards and honors ===
NFL

- NFL Offensive Rookie of the Year (2012)
- Pro Bowl (2012)
- Sporting News NFL Rookie of the Year (2012)
- PFWA All-Rookie Team (2012)
- Ranked No. 15 in the Top 100 Players of 2013
- 2× NFC Offensive Player of the Week (Week 1, 2012; Week 11, 2012)
- 2× Pro Football Weekly NFL Offensive Player of the Week (Week 1, 2012; Week 12, 2012)

College

- Heisman Trophy (2011)
- Davey O'Brien Award (2011)
- Manning Award (2011)
- AP College Football Player of the Year (2011)
- SN Player of the Year (2011)
- Chic Harley Award (2011)
- Consensus All-American (2011)
- Big 12 Offensive Player of the Year (2011)
- Big 12 Offensive Freshman of the Year (2008)
- Sporting News and Rivals.com freshman first-team All-American (2008)
- First-team All-Big 12 (2011)
- Second-team All-Big 12 (2010)
- First-team Academic All-Big 12 (2011)
- Baylor's Kyle Woods Inspirational Leader (2010)
- Big 12 gold medalist (2008, 400 m hurdles)
- Track & Field All-American (2008, 400 m hurdles)
- Baylor Offensive MVP (2008)

=== Records ===
NFL

- Youngest player in NFL history to achieve a perfect passer rating in a game (22 years, 284 days old; broken by Marcus Mariota)
- Highest single-season passer rating by a rookie quarterback (102.4, broken by Dak Prescott)
- Highest single-season touchdown to interception ratio by a rookie (4:1, broken by Dak Prescott)

College

Griffin set or tied 8 single-game, 26 single-season, and 20 career Baylor records.

- 2008 Rushing yards by a freshman: 843
- 2008 Rushing yards by a QB: 843
- 2008 Rushing yards (Game): 217
- 2008 Rushing yards Per attempt (Game): 19.7 vs. Washington State, (11 for 217 yards; also a conference record)
- 2008 Rushing TDs (Season): 13 (tied)
- 2008 Rushing TDs by a QB (Season): 13
- 2011 Most passing yards (Season): 4,293
- 2011 Most touchdown passes (Season): 37
- 2011 Highest passing efficiency rating (Season): 189.5
- 2011 Highest completion percentage (Season): 72.4
- 2011 Most total offense (Season): 4,992
- Most passing yards (Career): 10,366
- Most touchdown passes (Career): 78
- Highest passing efficiency rating (Career): 158.9
- Highest completion percentage (Career): 67.1
- Most total offense (Career): 12,620
- Rushing TDs by a QB (Career): 23
- 100-yard Rushing games by QB (Season): 4
- 100-yard Rushing games by QB (Career): 5

== Post-playing career ==
=== Analyst career ===
In August 2021, Griffin signed a multi-year contract with ESPN as an analyst for their college football coverage and NFL Live. Griffin has publicly stated his desire to continue playing and that his contract with ESPN would allow him to sign with a team if the opportunity arises. Griffin later joined Monday Night Countdown in 2022 to replace Randy Moss. Ahead of the 2024 season, Griffin was replaced on the program by Jason Kelce. On August 15, 2024, the network fired him. On April 24, 2025, it was reported that Griffin joined Fox Sports to be part of their college football coverage. He initially worked with Jason Benetti to form the No. 2 team on college game broadcasts. In July 2026, Connor Onion was reported to be the replacement for Benetti, who left Fox for NBC.

=== Podcasting ===
In September 2023, Griffin launched via YouTube his own podcast series, "RG3 and The Ones," which is based on interviews with personnel involved with the NFL.

== Personal life ==
Griffin began dating fellow Baylor student Rebecca Liddicoat in 2009, and the two were married on July 6, 2013. Rebecca gave birth to the couple's first child, a daughter, in 2015. On August 16, 2016, it was reported that Griffin and his wife were separated and in the process of filing for divorce.

Also in August 2016, Griffin and Estonian heptathlete Grete Šadeiko became romantically linked. They were engaged on May 13, 2017. In 2017, Griffin announced via Instagram the birth of his second daughter. The couple married on March 10, 2018; she is now Grete Griffin. His third daughter was born in September 2019. On December 31, 2022, Griffin abruptly left Pat McAfee's alternate broadcast of the December 2022 Fiesta Bowl after learning that Grete was in labor with his fourth child.

Griffin grew up as a fan of the Denver Broncos and Mike Shanahan, whom he played under for his first two seasons with the Redskins. Griffin is an evangelical Christian, and has said his relationship with God is his "most important influence." He does not smoke, drink alcohol, or use drugs, saying that "I need my body to be at its peak performance, and I want to have a long career."

Before the start of his rookie season with the Washington Redskins, Griffin had signed a number of endorsement deals from companies including Adidas, Castrol Motor Oil, EA Sports, EvoShield, Gatorade, Nissan, and Subway. According to ESPN's Dollars blog, Griffin had "earned more than any other rookie in NFL history before throwing his first regular-season pass," largely as a result of endorsements.

Griffin has his own charitable foundation called the RGIII foundation, which helps underprivileged youth, military families, and victims of domestic violence. In December 2022, the foundation gave a one-day shopping spree at Walmart for 25 Boys & Girls Clubs members in his hometown of Copperas Cove, Texas. The foundation also donated 10,500 meals to the North Texas Food Bank in February 2021. Griffin has also been involved with the Family of 3 foundation to help three new struggling families each year.

While Griffin played for the Redskins, he lived in Leesburg, Virginia, a suburb of Washington, D.C., until April 2016 when he sold his home for $2.7 million. He then purchased a home in Montgomery, Texas for $2.25 million.
