= Copperas Cove Independent School District =

School district in Texas

Copperas Cove Independent School District is a public school district based in Copperas Cove, Texas, United States. Located in Coryell County, a small portion of the district extends into Bell County.

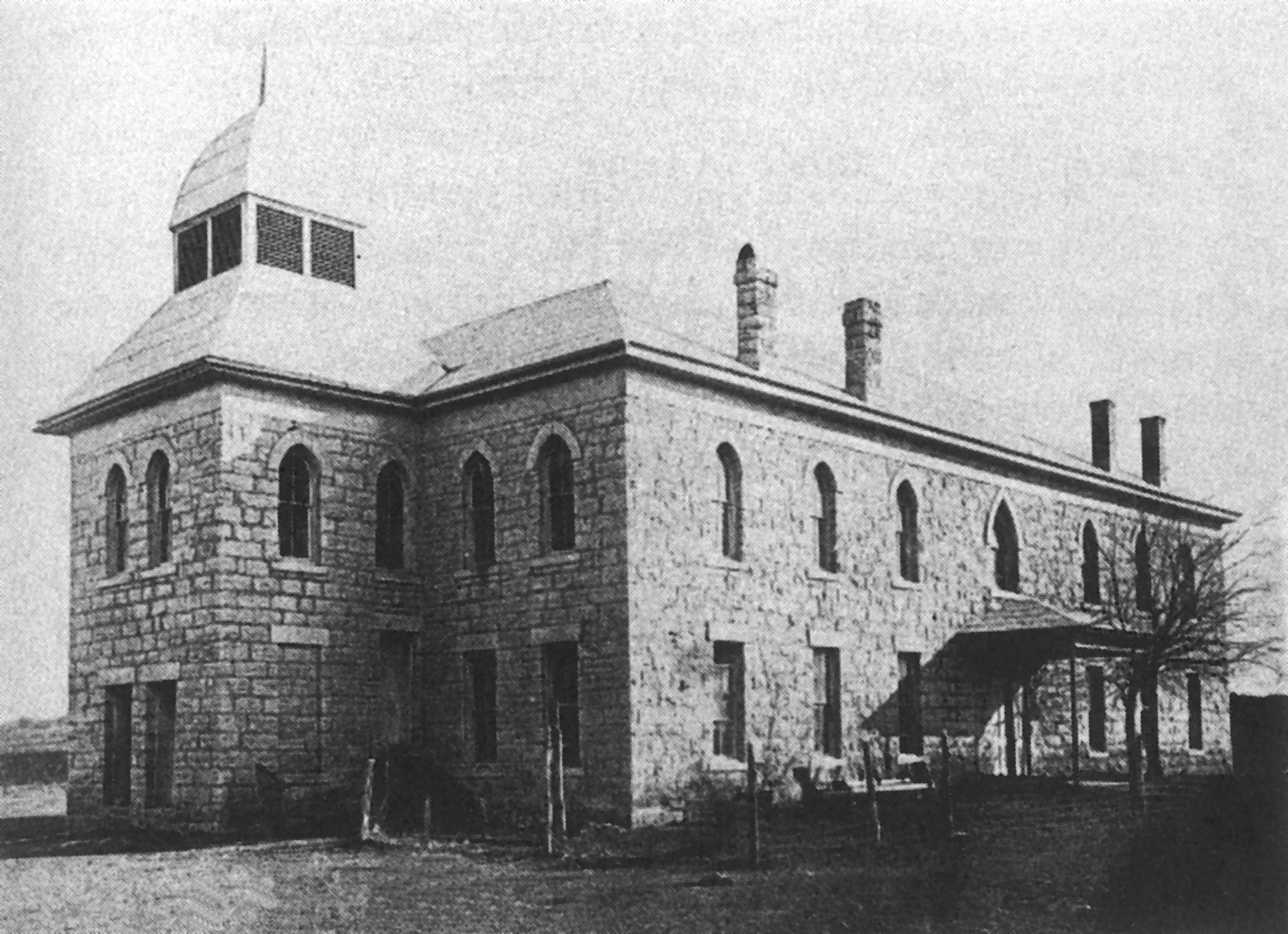
Original Schoolhouse at Avenue E & 6th Street on the eastern edge of town circa 1900

In 2009, the school district was rated "recognized" by the Texas Education Agency.

== Schools ==
=== High School ===
- Copperas Cove High School
- Crossroads High School

=== Junior High ===
- Copperas Cove Junior High School
- S.C. Lee Junior High School

=== Elementary School ===
- C.R. Clements/Hollie Parsons Elementary
- Fairview/Miss Jewell Elementary
- Hettie Halstead Elementary
- House Creek Elementary
- J.L. Williams/Lovett Ledger Elementary
- Martin Walker Elementary

=== Early Education ===
- Mae Stevens Early Learning Academy
