= Copperas Cove, Texas =

- City
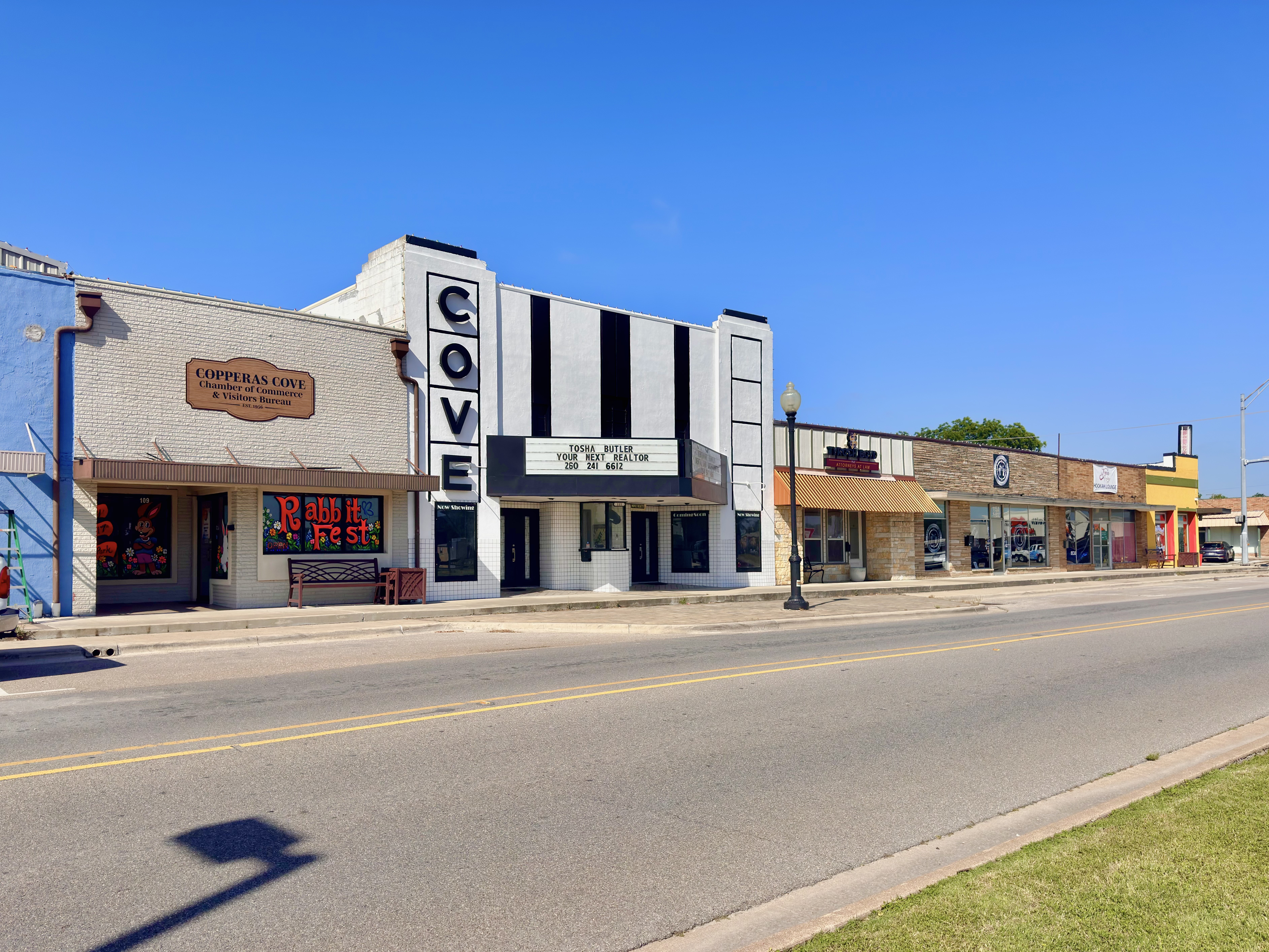
- Downtown Copperas Cove along Ave D in May 2026

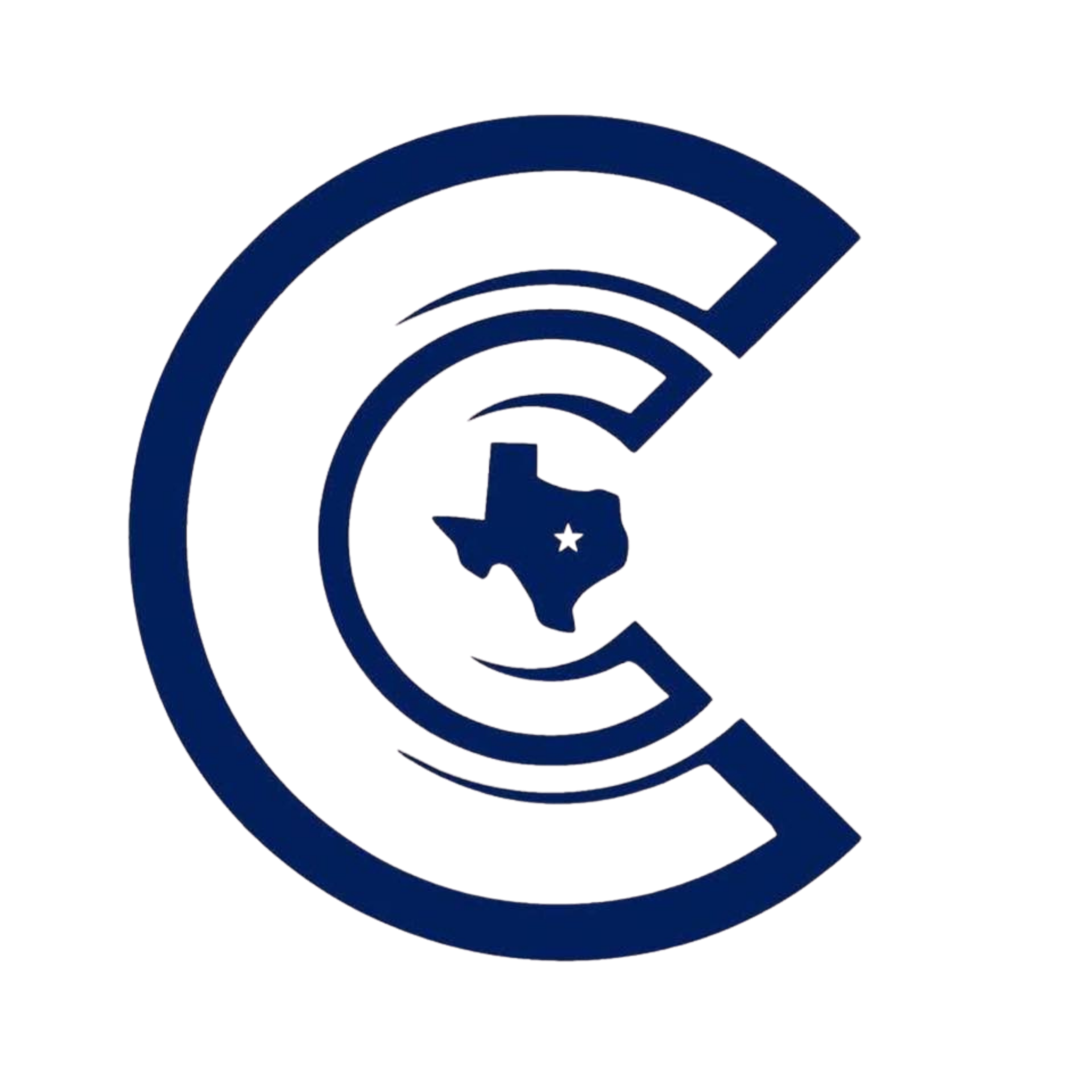
- Seal
- Nickname: City of Five Hills
- Location of Copperas Cove in Texas
- Coordinates: 31°07′30″N 97°54′06″W
- Country: United States
- State: Texas
- Counties: Coryell, Lampasas, Bell
- Founded: March 25, 1879
- Incorporated: 1913

Government
  - Type: Council-Manager

Area
  - Total: 18.03 sq mi (46.71 km^{2})
  - Land: 18.03 sq mi (46.71 km^{2})
  - Water: 0 sq mi (0.00 km^{2})
- Elevation: 1,125 ft (343 m)

Population (2020)
  - Total: 36,670
  - Density: 2,033/sq mi (785.1/km^{2})
- Demonym: Covite
- Time zone: UTC-6 (Central (CST))
  - Summer (DST): UTC-5 (CDT)
- ZIP code: 76522
- Area code: 254
- FIPS code: 48-16624
- GNIS feature ID: 2410225
- Website: www.copperascovetx.gov

Copperas Cove (/ˈkɒpərəs/ KOP-ər-əs) Also known as The City Of Five Hills is a city located in Central Texas at the southern corner of Coryell County, with smaller portions in Lampasas and Bell Counties. Founded in 1879 as a small ranching and farming community, the city is the largest in Coryell County, with a population of 36,670 at the 2020 census. The city's economy is closely linked to nearby Fort Hood, making it part of the Killeen-Temple-Fort Hood metropolitan statistical area.

== History ==
The first evidence of human habitation in the Five Hills area dates back to at least 4,000 BC. Artifacts, such as skeletal remains, arrowheads, and other stone tools, have been found along local creek beds and valley floors. These first residents were nomadic hunters, traveling in small groups following migrating buffalo herds. When the Spanish came to Texas, a small Plains tribe known as the Tonkawa inhabited the area. The powerful Comanche controlled a vast stretch of land to the north and west, making now-Coryell County a hostile battleground as settlers moved into the area.

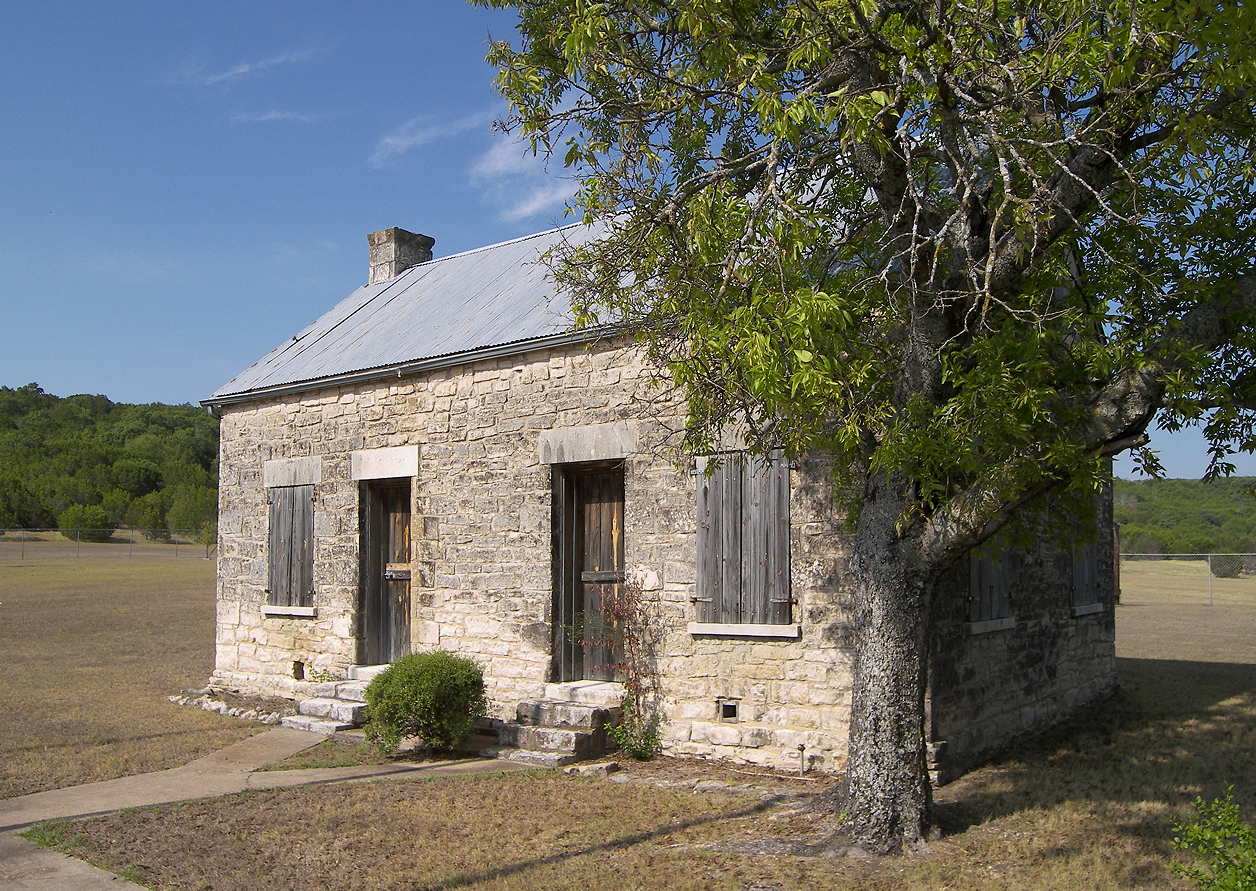
Original post office and stage stop

In 1825, Mexico provided Stephen F. Austin with a land grant encompassing a large area, including present-day Copperas Cove. Starting in the 1830s, the first European settlers came into the Five Hills region, but the area lacked stability until after the Civil War. Substantial settlement did not arrive until the development of the cattle industry during the 1870s, when a feeder route of the Chisholm Trail was cut through the region. Settlement centered around a local general store about two miles southwest of present-day downtown. In 1878, residents applied for a post office under the name "Cove", so chosen for the site's sheltered location, but the name was already taken by a nearby community (now called Evant). Inspired by the taste of nearby spring water, residents amended the name to "Copperas Cove" (officially in 1901). The post office was established in March 1879, with Marsden Ogletree as the town's first postmaster. The original building remains today and is the site of the Ogletree Gap Heritage Festival.

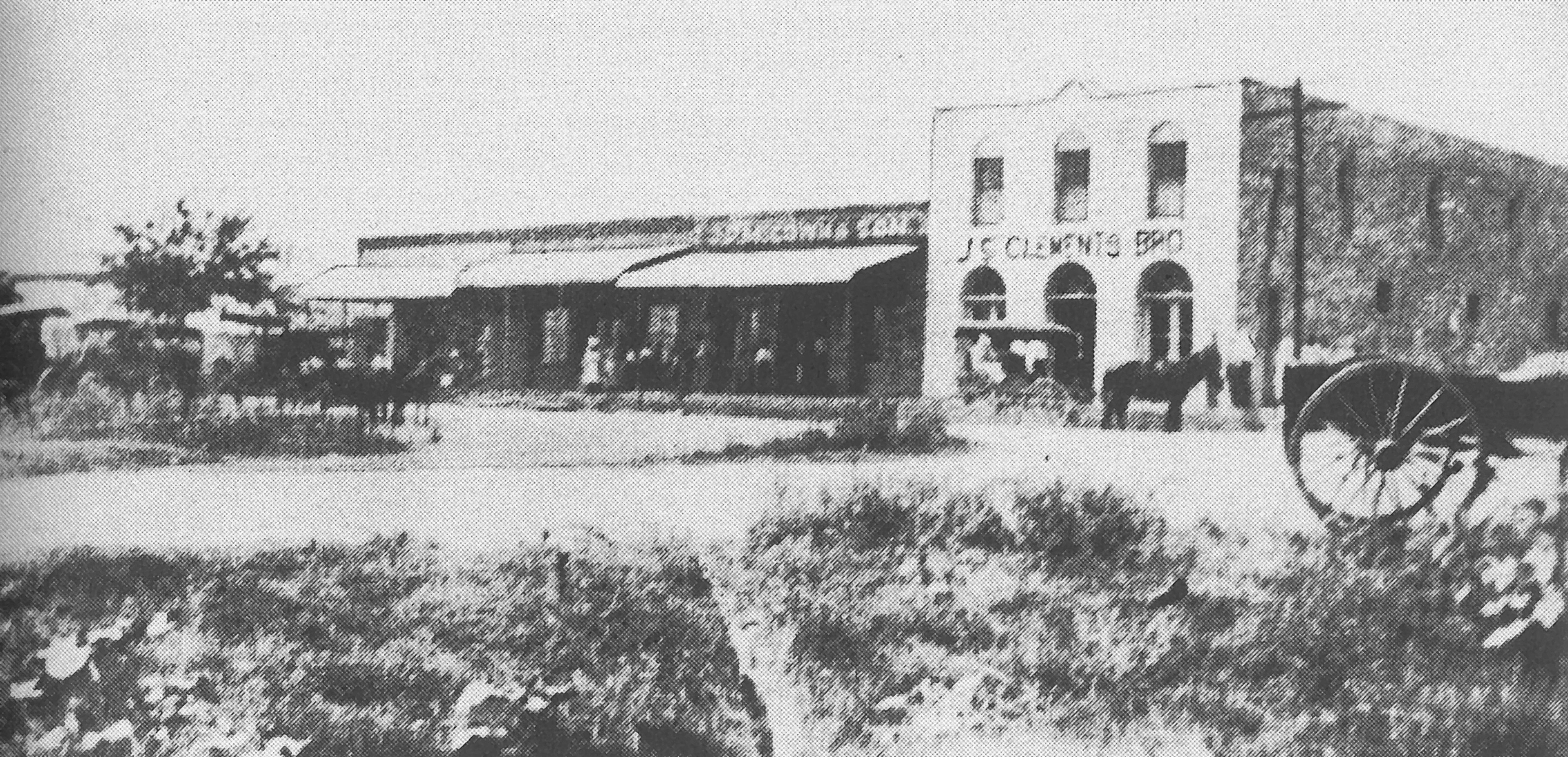
Avenue D east of Main Street, circa 1905

Copperas Cove's fortunes were greatly improved, when in 1882, the Gulf, Colorado and Santa Fe Railway expanded into the region. Local resident Jesse M. Clements lobbied to obtain train service and provided the railroad company with the necessary right-of-way about two miles northeast of town. Residents soon moved to a new set of streets laid out by the company's engineer, E.F. Batte. The train depot at Copperas Cove served as the shipping point for farmers and ranchers in the area between Cowhouse Creek and the Lampasas River. Businesses opened to provide services for these area residents, including a steam gristmill-cotton gin, three hotels, a barber shop, and an opera house. Many of the town's early buildings remain to this day, focusing around the block of Avenue D between Main Street and 1st Street. By 1900, the population had reached 475, and residents voted to form their own school district. A private bank opened in 1906, and residents elected Jouett Allin their first mayor in 1913. The town continued to prosper over the coming years, depending largely on local agriculture, of which cotton played a dominant role. Copperas Cove reached a then-peak population of 600 in 1929, but entered a state of decline with the onset of the Great Depression. During the 1930s, the local bank failed, several businesses closed, and many people left to look for work in other areas. By 1940, only 356 people remained.

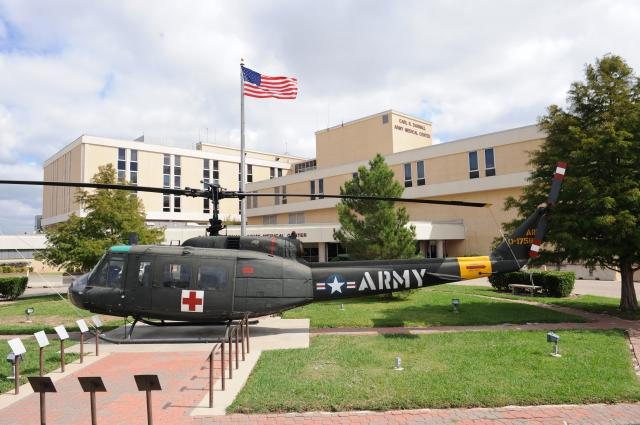
Carl R. Darnall Army Medical Center at Fort Hood

In 1942, Copperas Cove received new life when the US government located Camp Hood next to the struggling community. By the time the cantonment was upgraded to Fort Hood in 1950, the town had over a thousand residents. The population continued to increase rapidly, reaching almost 5,000 in 1960 and more than doubling each of the next two decades, eventually coming to 32,032 at the 2010 census. During this period, the city limits greatly expanded, encompassing acres of newly built tract housing with upgraded roads and services. The establishment of the fort drastically altered the character of the city. Soldiers from across the country brought their families and settled in Copperas Cove, often remaining after concluding their military service. In addition to diversifying the ethnic and religious composition of the city, Fort Hood altered the local economy. Since much of the area farmland was acquired by the federal government, businesses within Copperas Cove now largely provide services for Fort Hood soldiers and their families. Originally renamed Fort Cavazos in 2023, the installation returned to its historic name—Fort Hood—in 2025, commemorating Colonel Robert B. Hood's valor during World War I.

== Geography and climate ==
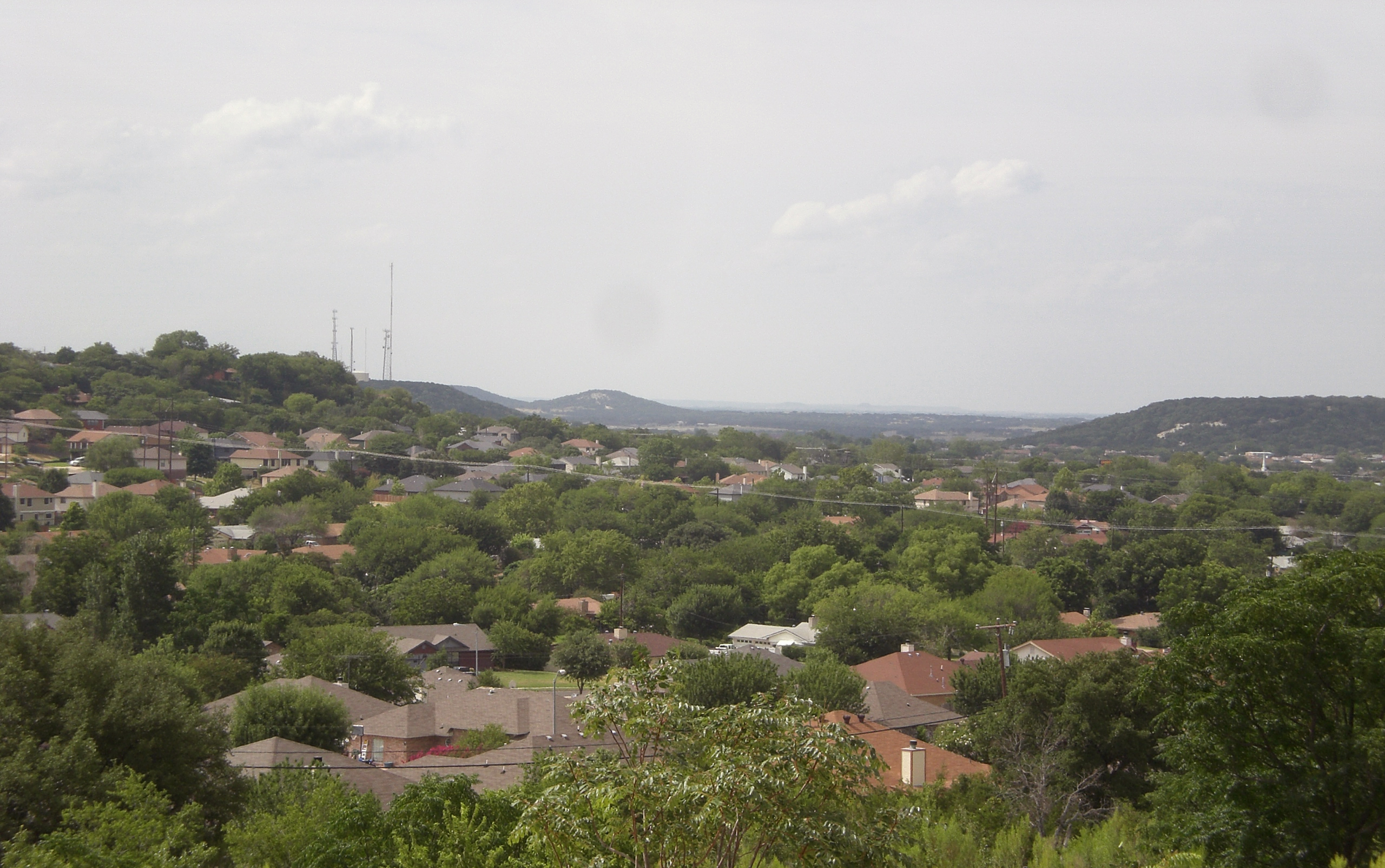
View of city from Rattlesnake Point looking north

Copperas Cove is located in the Limestone Cut Plains of Central Texas, within an agglomeration of hills situated between the Lampasas River and Cowhouse Creek valleys, known as the "Five Hills" area. Copperas Cove's climate is humid subtropical with hot summers, cool winters, and rainy springs. The average high in August is 96 °F (36 °C) and the average low in January is 35 °F (2 °C). May is the rainiest month. The city lies within the Tornado Alley, and tornadoes have been known to touch down in the area. Rainfall averages 33 inches (840 mm) per year, making the land suitable for agriculture without irrigation, though the region is prone to drought.

The area's thin layer of topsoil tends to be a light, crumbly caliche—capable of sustaining many agricultural plants, but susceptible to depletion and erosion. Before ranchers and farmers began altering the landscape, the area was once part of a vast tallgrass prairie grassland. Bison, deer, and pronghorn grazed on tall native grasses. Because of overgrazing, land clearing, and the suppression of wildfires, though, these native grasses have been mostly replaced by invasive weeds and tough, woody trees, including Texas live oak, Texas red oak, red juniper (red cedar), and mesquite.

Copperas Cove has a suburban cityscape typical among American small towns developed in the post-World War II era. Most of commercial activity occurs along the main thoroughfare, US Highway 190. Since most of Copperas Cove has been built after 1950, the extent of the town's walkable, historic downtown is considerably smaller than nearby, less populated communities, such as Lampasas or Gatesville. Most residential neighborhoods are low-density, single-family homes. Because of changing economic conditions in recent decades, intensive farming and ranching have largely left the area, making land fairly cheap to develop. After a brief slowdown of development during the 1980s, new subdivisions resumed expansion into the surrounding countryside.

Climate data for Copperas Cove, Texas
Month	Jan	Feb	Mar	Apr	May	Jun	Jul	Aug	Sep	Oct	Nov	Dec	Year
Mean daily maximum °F (°C)	58 (14)	63 (17)	70 (21)	78 (26)	84 (29)	91 (33)	95 (35)	96 (36)	89 (32)	80 (27)	68 (20)	60 (16)	78 (26)
Mean daily minimum °F (°C)	36 (2)	38 (3)	45 (7)	53 (12)	61 (16)	69 (21)	72 (22)	71 (22)	65 (18)	56 (13)	44 (7)	38 (3)	54 (12)
Average precipitation inches (mm)	1.7 (43)	2.5 (64)	2.9 (74)	2.5 (64)	4.5 (110)	3.7 (94)	1.3 (33)	1.9 (48)	3.1 (79)	3.2 (81)	2.9 (74)	2.7 (69)	32.9 (840)
Source: weather.com

== Transportation ==
The major thoroughfare through Copperas Cove is Interstate 14/U.S. Highway 190, connecting the city to Interstate 35 in Belton, 28 miles (45 km) to the east, and to U.S. Highway 281 in Lampasas, 19 miles (31 km) to the west. FM 116 runs north through town, connecting the city to Gatesville 26 miles (42 km) to the north.

Public transportation is provided within the city by the Hill Country Transit District, whose buses can be recognized by their teal and purple color. The region is served by the Killeen Regional Airport located a few miles outside the city limits.

== Demographics ==
Historical population
Census	Pop.	Note	%±
1900	475		—
1910	490		3.2%
1920	509		3.9%
1930	406		−20.2%
1940	356		−12.3%
1950	1,052		195.5%
1960	4,567		334.1%
1970	10,818		136.9%
1980	24,519		126.7%
1990	24,079		−1.8%
2000	29,592		22.9%
2010	32,032		8.2%
2020	36,670		14.5%
2023 (est.)	38,696		5.5%
U.S. Decennial Census

=== 2020 census ===
As of the 2020 census, Copperas Cove had 36,670 people, 13,839 households, and 8,911 families. The median age was 32.7 years. 27.8% of residents were under the age of 18 and 11.7% of residents were 65 years of age or older. For every 100 females there were 92.5 males, and for every 100 females age 18 and over there were 88.5 males age 18 and over.

98.1% of residents lived in urban areas, while 1.9% lived in rural areas.

There were 13,839 households in Copperas Cove, of which 38.5% had children under the age of 18 living in them. Of all households, 46.3% were married-couple households, 17.7% were households with a male householder and no spouse or partner present, and 29.6% were households with a female householder and no spouse or partner present. About 25.9% of all households were made up of individuals and 7.8% had someone living alone who was 65 years of age or older.

There were 14,985 housing units, of which 7.6% were vacant. Among occupied housing units, 52.9% were owner-occupied and 47.1% were renter-occupied. The homeowner vacancy rate was 2.0% and the rental vacancy rate was 8.1%.

Racial composition as of the 2020 census
Race	Number	Percent
White	19,965	54.4%
Black or African American	6,790	18.5%
American Indian and Alaska Native	310	0.8%
Asian	1,083	3.0%
Native Hawaiian and Other Pacific Islander	822	2.2%
Some other race	2,220	6.1%
Two or more races	5,480	14.9%
Hispanic or Latino (of any race)	7,284	19.9%

=== 2000 census ===
As of the 2000 census, 29,592 people, 10,273 households, and 8,023 families resided in the city. The population density was 2,124.9 inhabitants per square mile (820.4/km^{2}). The 11,120 housing units averaged 798.5 per square mile (308.2/km^{2}). The racial makeup of the city was 65.36% White, 20.43% African American, 0.87% Native American, 2.70% Asian, 0.58% Pacific Islander, 4.98% from other races, and 5.09% from two or more races. Hispanics or Latinos of any race were 11.69% of the population.

Of the 10,273 households, 47.3% had children under 18 living with them, 62.2% were married couples living together, 12.7% had a female householder with no husband present, and 21.9% were not families. About 16.7% of all households were made up of individuals, and 3.2% had someone living alone who was 65 years of age or older. The average household size was 2.85 and the average family size was 3.19.

In the city, the age distribution was 32.0% under 18, 14.2% from 18 to 24, 33.3% from 25 to 44, 15.4% from 45 to 64, and 5.1% who were 65 or older. The median age was 27 years. For every 100 females, there were 98.0 males. For every 100 females 18 and over, there were 96.3 males.

The median income for a household in the city was $37,869 and for a family was $40,517. Males had a median income of $26,406 versus $22,270 for females. The per capita income for the city was $15,995. About 8.1% of families and 9.6% of the population were below the poverty line, including 13.8% of those under 18 and 5.9% of those 65 or over.

== Government ==
=== Local government ===
Copperas Cove has a council–manager municipal government. Residents elect a mayor and seven council members to three-year terms, with a two-term limit. The city council appoints a city manager, who handles the administrative functions of the municipal government. The current mayor is Dan Yancey (elected on November 2, 2021, Inaugurated on November 16, 2021).

According to the city's 2009 Comprehensive Annual Financial Report Fund Financial Statements, the city's various funds had $16.8 million in revenues, $26.7 million in expenditures, $15.8 million in total assets, $2.7 million in total liabilities, and $20.0 million in investments.

=== County government ===
At the county level, Copperas Cove votes for Coryell County Commissioner seats 1, 2, 3, and 4, which are currently held by Kyle Matthews, Scott Weddle, Ryan Basham, and Keith Taylor, respectively. The county judge is Roger Miller. Parts of Copperas Cove fall into Lampasas and Bell Counties, and are represented by those county officials.

=== State government ===
The city votes overwhelmingly Republican in both state and federal elections. Most of Copperas Cove falls within the 59th District of the Texas House of Representatives, which is currently represented by Republican Sid Miller. Brian Birdwell of the 22nd District holds the state senate seat that represents Coryell County.

=== Federal government ===
At the federal level, most of Copperas Cove is part of Texas' 31st District, which is currently represented by Republican John Carter. The two U.S. senators from Texas are Republicans John Cornyn and Ted Cruz.

=== Education ===
==== Public school districts ====
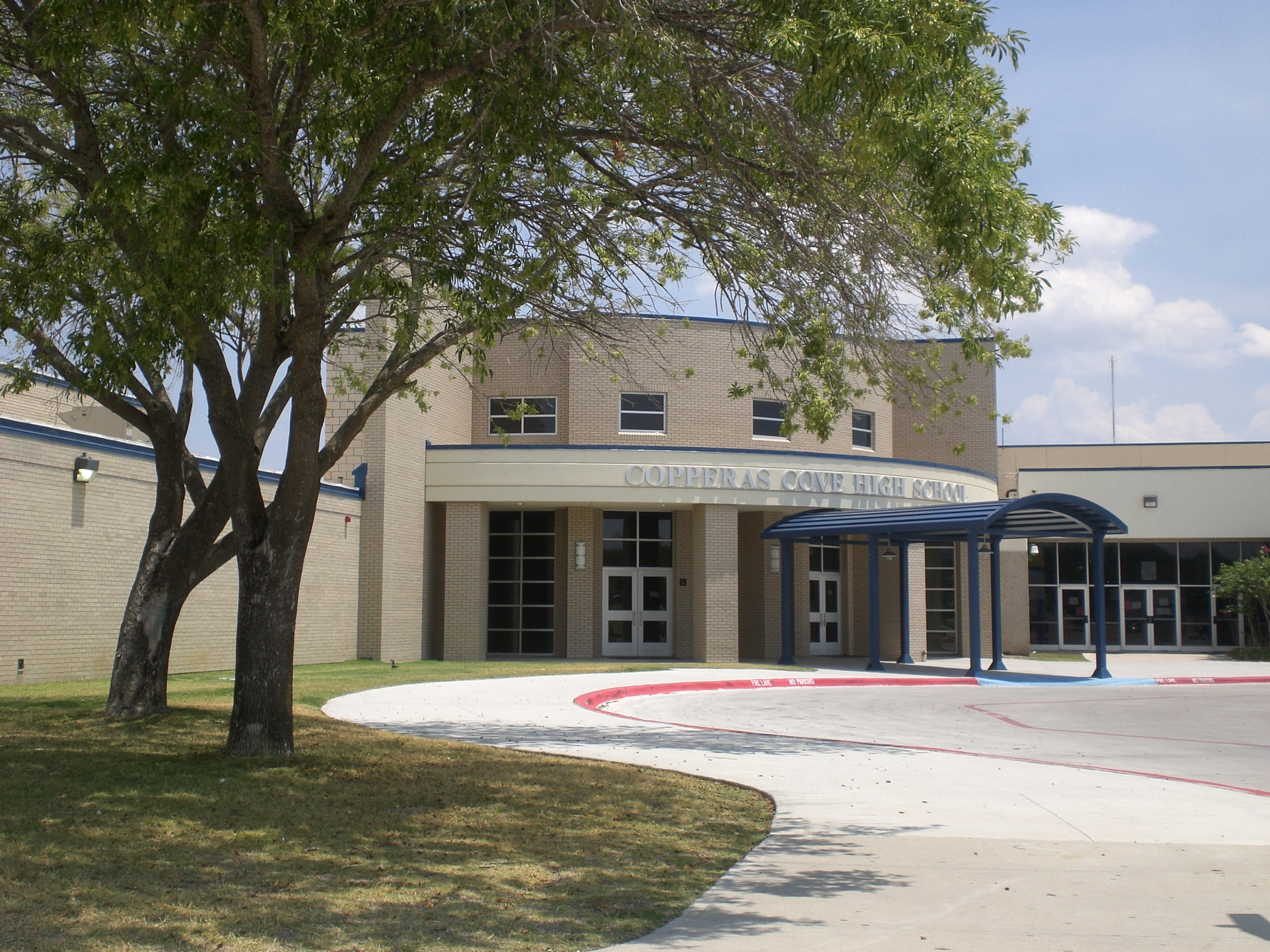
Copperas Cove High School

The vast majority of Copperas Cove is within the Copperas Cove Independent School District, including seven elementary schools, two junior highs, one high school, and an alternative learning center. Among these are:

- Elementary: Clements/Hollie Parsons, Fairview/Miss Jewell, Hettie Halstead, House Creek, J.L. Williams/Lovett Ledger, Mae Stevens, Martin Walker
- Copperas Cove Junior High, S.C Lee Junior High
- Copperas Cove High School
- Alternative education: Crossroads High School

The portion in Lampasas County is in the Lampasas Independent School District.

==== Public high schools ====
Copperas Cove High School's athletic teams are known as the Bulldawgs (Lady Bulldawgs for women's teams). The school's mascot is "Sparky". In recent years, Copperas Cove has produced many professional athletes, including T.J. Hollowell (NFL New York Jets and Denver Broncos), Vontez Duff (NFL New York Giants), Charles Tillman (NFL Carolina Panthers), Shereka Wright (WNBA Phoenix Mercury), and 2011 Heisman Trophy winner and former NFL quarterback Robert Griffin III.

=== Community colleges ===
Central Texas College has a main campus that is partly in Copperas Cove and partly in Killeen. Central Texas College's service area includes Coryell and Lampasas Counties, as well as the Copperas Cove Independent School District (the parts in Coryell and Bell Counties) and the Killeen Independent School District.

== Economy ==
According to the city's 2020 Comprehensive Annual Financial Report, the top employers in the city are:

Number	Employer	Number of employees
1	Fort Hood – military	36,739
2	Fort Hood – civilian	14,445
3	Copperas Cove Independent School District	1,300
4	GC Services	1,250
5	HEB Grocery Store	333
6	Walmart	297
7	City of Copperas Cove	294
8	Copperas Cove Nursing and Rehabilitation	112
9	Hill Country Rehabilitation and Nursing Center	80
10	Cinergy	77

== Annual events and festivals ==
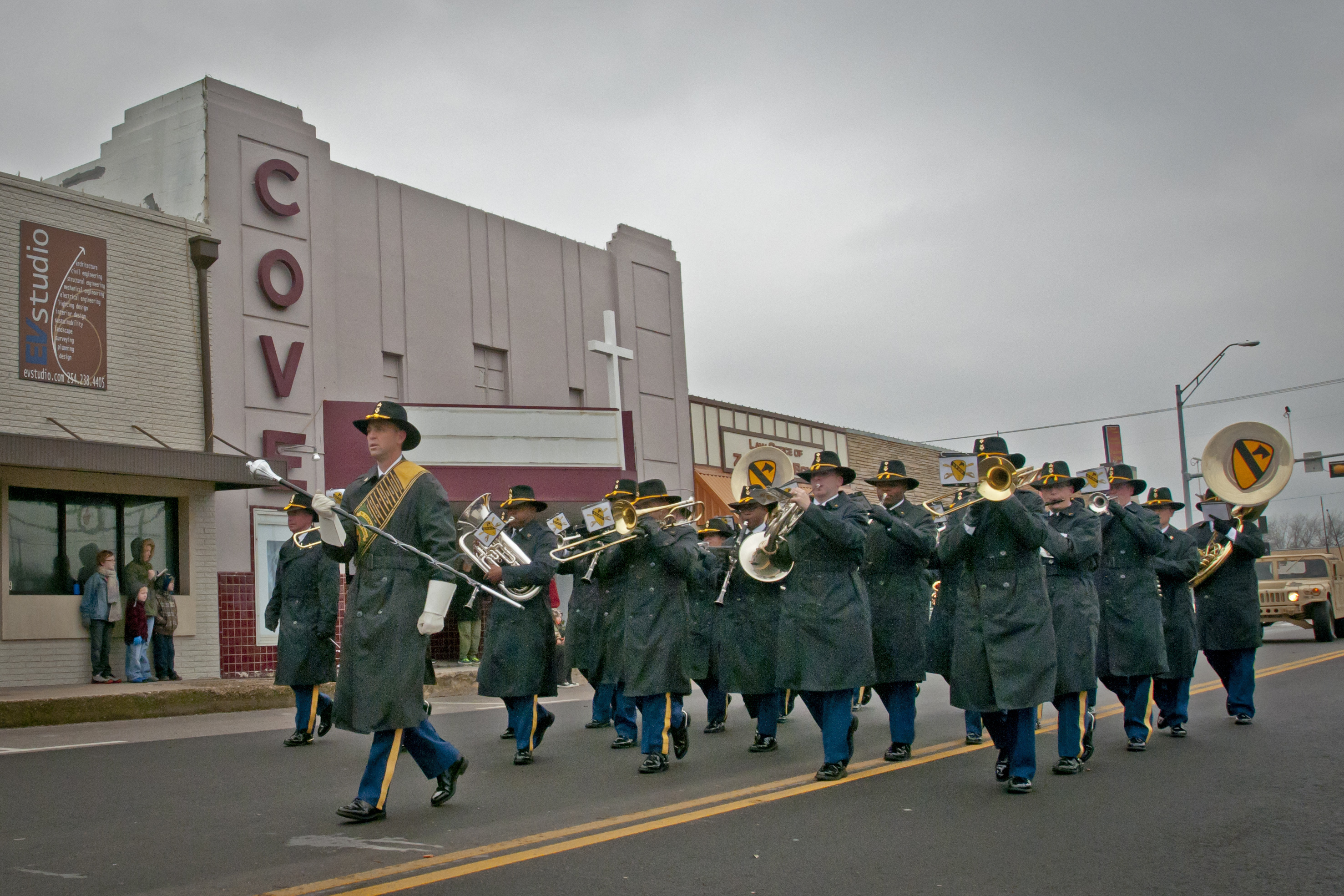
The 1st Cavalry Division Band marching in Copperas Cove during the Children's Christmas Parade, December 2013

Rabbit Fest is a four-day arts and crafts festival held on the third weekend of May each year. Festivities include a carnival, midway, parade, chili cook-off, and many other activities.

The Ogletree Gap Heritage Festival is held at the city's original town site, the Ogletree Gap Stagecoach and Post Office. It occurs annually on the third weekend of October. Food, arts and crafts, Civil War reenactments, a petting zoo, pony rides, and kids' games are available.

The Krist Kindl Markt is held on the first weekend of December in downtown Copperas Cove. It is a German-inspired, open-air Christmas market sponsored by the Copperas Cove Chamber of Commerce and Visitor's Bureau. It typically hosts live music and performances by local groups. Also, a night-time Christmas parade is held.

Begun in 2000, the Copperas Cove Classic Road Race is held mid-January each year. The bike race covers 83 miles (134 km) of the city's hilly terrain.

The C.H.A.M.P.S. Heart of Texas Bowl is hosted by Copperas Cove at Bulldawg Stadium. The first bowl game was held in 2001.

== Notable people ==
- Robert Griffin III, Heisman Trophy winner and NFL quarterback
- Shaye Haver, U.S. Army First Lieutenant, born in Copperas Cove
- Suzanna Hupp, survivor of the Luby's massacre, former Texas representative for District 54, and progun activist
- Rashard Odomes (born 1996), basketball player in the Israeli Basketball Premier League
- Chester M. Ovnand, one of the first two American soldiers killed in South Vietnam
- Michael Stipe, R.E.M. frontman, lived in Copperas Cove
- Charles Tillman, retired Chicago Bears and Carolina Panthers cornerback
