= Hill Country Transit District =

Bus service in the Killeen–Temple metropolitan area, Texas, U.S.

- Founded: 1988
- Headquarters: 4515 West US Highway 190, Belton, Texas; United States
- Service area: Bell County, Coryell County, and Milam County
- Service type: Bus service, paratransit, microtransit
- Routes: 5 bus routes 9 microtransit zones
- Stops: 19
- Hubs: 1
- Fleet: 153
- Fuel type: Diesel & Unleaded Fuel
- Operator: Hendrickson Transportation Group (Management Only since 2022)
- General Manager: Raymond Suarez
- Website: http://www.takethehop.com/

The Hill Country Transit District, branded as The HOP, is a public transit operator serving the Killeen–Temple metropolitan area. The HOP operates microtransit services in five urban cities, three rural cities, a commuter bus route connecting Belton, Copperas Cove, Harker Heights, Killeen, and Temple, and rural demand-response service in three counties. The district also operates transit service within Fort Hood under the name Cavazos Connector.

The district is governed by a board of directors with a representative of each county and major city served and is a member of the Killeen Temple Metropolitan Planning Organization. Funding for the district comes from transit fares, the Federal Transit Administration, Texas Department of Transportation (TxDOT), and contributions from the counties and cities served.

== Services ==
=== Microtransit ===
The HOP operates microtransit services in nine cities: Belton, Cameron, Copperas Cove, Gatesville, Harker Heights, Killeen, Rockdale, and Temple. Trips cost $2 and can be scheduled up to 14 days in advance, but they must stop and end in the same city. For trips that utilize the Connector Route to commute between cities, the fare is $4.

=== Regional Commuter bus ===
The HOP operates a Regional Commuter route between the five urban cities, which operates on weekdays on a fixed schedule.Rides cost $2 per ride (in addition to any Microtransit fares incurred).

=== Cavazos Connector ===
Cavazos Connector service consists of a dedicated microtransit service. Microtransit services the fort's barracks, cantonments, and family housing areas. Unlike most of The HOP's services, Cavazos Connector services operate seven days a week and are free.

=== Rural Demand-Response ===
The HOP operates demand-response service in Coryell County, Milam County, and non-urban portions of Bell County. Trips cost $4 and can be scheduled up to 14 days in advance, but they must stop and end in the same county.

The HOP previously operated Rural Demand-Response services in Hamilton County, Llano County, Mason County, Mills County, and San Saba County. On March 1, 2025, service in these counties was transferred to the Capital Area Rural Transportation System (Llano), the Concho Valley Transit District (Mason), and the Central Texas Rural Transit District (Hamilton/Mills/San Saba). On March 1st, 2026, service in Lampasas County was transferred to Central Texas Rural Transit District.

== Former bus routes ==
The HOP previously operated local fixed-route bus services, which were replaced with microtransit in September 2024.

Route #	Route Name	Cities Served	Discontinued date
1	Killeen Zephyr Road	Killeen	Modified along Veterans Memorial Blvd and renumbered Route 11 on November 1, 2005.
2	Texas A&M North / Lake Rd. / Rancier Ave.	Killeen	Replaced with microtransit in September 2024.
3	Killeen Lake Road	Killeen	Merged with Route 2 in November 2008.
4	Killeen Mall / Walmart / Scott & White Clinic	Killeen	Replaced with microtransit in September 2024.
5	H-E-B / DPS - Killeen	Killeen	Replaced with microtransit in September 2024.
6	Killeen / Florence Road	Killeen	Merged with Route 5 in November 2008.
7	Killeen Scott & White Clinic / Mall	Killeen	Discontinued on November 1, 2005.
7	Robinett Rd. / Texas A&M South/ Airport / Metroplex Hospital	Killeen	Discontinued on September 1, 2017.
8	Killeen Downtown / Northwest	Killeen	Discontinued on November 1, 2005.
11	Killeen Zephyr Road / Veterans Memorial Blvd	Killeen	Discontinued on May 1, 2006.
20	Killeen Westcliff / Industrial Park (via Business 190)	Killeen	Discontinued on November 1, 2005.
21	Veterans Memorial Blvd. / W.S. Young Dr. / Killeen Civic Center / KPD	Killeen	Discontinued on September 1, 2017.
30	Killeen Ellison High School / Harker Heights	Killeen	Merged with Route 4 on May 1, 2006.
30	H-E-B / Stan Schlueter Loop / Lions Club / Harker Heights Wal-Mart	Killeen	Discontinued September 1, 2017.
35	Harker Heights Loop	Harker Heights	Replaced with microtransit in September 2024.
40	Fort Hood / Darnall Hospital	Killeen	Discontinued on January 1, 2004.
60	Copperas Cove Civic Center	Copperas Cove	Combined with Routes 70 and 75 into Route 65 in late 2005.
65	Copperas Cove Loop	Copperas Cove	Replaced with microtransit in September 2024.
70	Copperas Cove Civic Center	Copperas Cove	Combined with Routes 60 and 75 into Route 65 in late 2005.
75	Copperas Cove HEB / WalMart	Copperas Cove	Combined with Routes 60 and 70 into Route 65 in late 2005.
100	Metroplex / CTC / Copperas Cove	Killeen; Copperas Cove	Replaced with microtransit in September 2024.
200	Nolanville Shuttle	Nolanville	Discontinued on January 1, 2004.
200	Harker Heights / Nolanville / Belton / Temple Connector	Killeen; Harker Heights; Nolanville; Belton; Temple	Replaced with microtransit in September 2024.
300	The Connector		Discontinued on November 1, 2005.
510	VA Hospital / Temple College / Temple Mall / Walmart	Temple	Replaced with microtransit in September 2024.
520	Scott & White Hospital / King's Daughters Clinic / Sam's Club	Temple	Discontinued in late 2016.
530	Adams Ave / Temple HS / Social Security Office	Temple	Replaced with microtransit in September 2024.
550	Silver Line Flex Route	Killeen	Replaced with microtransit in September 2024.
610	Belton	Belton	Replaced with microtransit in September 2024.
