= Rashard Odomes =

American basketball player (born 1996)

No. 1 – Hapoel Gilboa Galil
- Positions: Guard and forward
- League: Israeli Basketball Premier League

Personal information
- Born: December 21, 1996 (age 29) Anchorage, Alaska, U.S.
- Listed height: 6 ft 6 in (1.98 m)
- Listed weight: 217 lb (98 kg)

Career information
- High school: Copperas Cove High School
- College: University of Oklahoma
- Playing career: 2019–present

Rashard Odomes (born December 21, 1996) is an American basketball player for Hapoel Gilboa Galil in the Israeli Basketball Premier League. He plays the guard and forward positions. He played college basketball at the University of Oklahoma.

== Early life ==
As a child Odomes lived in Anchorage, Alaska, Copperas Cove, Texas, and Baltimore, Maryland. His mother Donna Stewart is a retired US Army first class sergeant. He is 6 feet 6 inches (198 cm) tall, and weighs 217 pounds (98 kg).

Odomes attended Copperas Cove High School. As a sophomore, he was second-team all-district. As a junior, he averaged 26.8 points, 8.4 rebounds, 3.7 assists, and 2.3 steals per game while shooting .561% from the field, and was named the Texas 8-5A Offensive Player of the Year. As a senior he averaged 25.2 points, 12.4 rebounds, 4.8 assists, and 2.7 steals per game while shooting 58.3% from the field, and was a Texas Class 6-A All-State selection and the District 12-6A MVP. He ended his career as the high school's all-time leading scorer.

== College career ==
Odomes played college basketball for the University of Oklahoma from 2015 to 2019, while majoring in human relations. In 2018-19 his .542 2-point field goal percentage was 10th-best in the Big-12. In college he was primarily known as a physical defensive player. In 2019, he was named Academic All-Big 12 First Team.

== Professional career ==
In 2019–20, Odomes played for Umeå BSKT in the Swedish Basketligan. He averaged 16.4 points and 2.8 assists per game. In 2020–21, he played for Joensuun Kataja in the Finnish Korisliiga. Odomes averaged 18.2 points and 3.0 assists per game.

In 2021-22 he played for FC Porto Ferpinta, primarily in the Liga Portuguesa de Basquetebol. Odomes averaged 12.1 points and 1.6 assists per game.

In 2022-23 Odomes is playing for Hapoel Gilboa Galil in the Israeli Basketball Premier League, at the guard and forward positions.
