= 2015–16 Alabama State Hornets basketball team =

American college basketball season

2015–16 Alabama State Hornets basketball
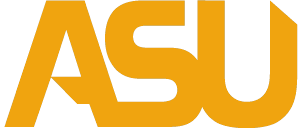
- Conference: Southwestern Athletic Conference
- Record: 14–17 (9–9 SWAC)
- Head coach: Lewis Jackson (11th season)
- Assistant coaches: Anthony Sewell; Steve Rogers; Michael Curry
- Home arena: Dunn–Oliver Acadome

2015–16 SWAC men's basketball standings
	Conf.				Overall
Team	W		L	PCT	W		L	PCT
Texas Southern	16	–	2	.889	18	–	15	.545
Alcorn State*	13	–	5	.722	15	–	15	.500
Jackson State	12	–	6	.667	20	–	16	.556
Southern †	11	–	7	.611	22	–	13	.629
Alabama State	9	–	9	.500	14	–	17	.452
Prairie View A&M	7	–	11	.389	7	–	24	.226
Alabama A&M	6	–	12	.333	11	–	18	.379
Arkansas–Pine Bluff	6	–	12	.333	8	–	25	.242
Mississippi Valley State	6	–	12	.333	8	–	27	.229
Grambling State	4	–	14	.222	7	–	24	.226
† 2016 SWAC tournament winner *ineligible for postseason due to APR violations

The 2015–16 Alabama State Hornets basketball team represented Alabama State University during the 2015–16 NCAA Division I men's basketball season. The Hornets, led by 11th-year head coach Lewis Jackson, played their home games at the Dunn–Oliver Acadome as members of the Southwestern Athletic Conference. They finished the season 14–17, 9–9 in SWAC play to finish in fifth place. They lost in the quarterfinals of the SWAC tournament to Southern.

== Roster ==
2015–16 Alabama State Hornets men's basketball team
Players
Coaches

Pos.	#	Name	Height	Weight	Year	Hometown
G/F	1	Chidozie Omile	6 ft 5 in (1.96 m)	210 lb (95 kg)	Sr	Woodbridge, VA
F	2	Corvon Butler	6 ft 5 in (1.96 m)	225 lb (102 kg)	Jr	Indianapolis, IN
G	3	Torloft Thomas	6 ft 3 in (1.91 m)	190 lb (86 kg)	Jr	Montgomery, AL
G/F	5	Bobby Brown	6 ft 6 in (1.98 m)	185 lb (84 kg)	Sr	Atlanta, GA
G	12	Jamel Waters	5 ft 9 in (1.75 m)	160 lb (73 kg)	Sr	Birmingham, AL
G	13	Joseff Smith	6 ft 2 in (1.88 m)	175 lb (79 kg)	Fr	Savannah, GA
F	14	Tony Armstrong	6 ft 6 in (1.98 m)	185 lb (84 kg)	RS Jr	Montgomery, AL
F	20	Glenn Hallaway	6 ft 9 in (2.06 m)	190 lb (86 kg)	RS So	Douglasville, Georgia
G	21	Devante Pope	6 ft 2 in (1.88 m)	175 lb (79 kg)	Jr	Pensacola, FL
G	22	Nicholas Barnes	6 ft 6 in (1.98 m)	175 lb (79 kg)	Jr	Lanett, AL
C	24	Branden Johnson	6 ft 7 in (2.01 m)	207 lb (94 kg)	Fr	Garfield Heights, OH
F	25	Mikel Tyson	6 ft 4 in (1.93 m)	235 lb (107 kg)	Fr	Detroit, MI
G	30	Terrance LeFlore	6 ft 1 in (1.85 m)	170 lb (77 kg)	RS So	Wetumpka, AL
C	45	Robert Ojeah	6 ft 9 in (2.06 m)	245 lb (111 kg)	Jr	Nigeria
G	52	Steve Rogers	6 ft 1 in (1.85 m)	160 lb (73 kg)	So	Montgomery, AL

Head coach

- Lewis Jackson (Alabama State)

Assistant coach(es)

- Anthony Sewell (Troy)
- Steve Rogers (Alabama State)
- Michael Curry (Alabama State)

Legend

- (C) Team captain
- (S) Suspended
- (I) Ineligible
- (W) Walk-on
- Injured
- Current redshirt

== Schedule and results ==
Date time, TV	Rank^{#}	Opponent^{#}	Result	Record	Site (attendance) city, state
Exhibition
11/05/2015*; 8:00 pm		Huntingdon	W 93–58		Dunn–Oliver Acadome; Montgomery, AL
Regular season
11/14/2015*; 6:00 pm, ESPN3		at Virginia Tech; Emerald Coast Classic	W 85–82	1–0	Cassell Coliseum (6,519); Blacksburg, VA
11/16/2015*; 8:00 pm, ASN		at UAB; Emerald Coast Classic	L 70–72	1–1	Bartow Arena (4,833); Birmingham, AL
11/19/2015*; 5:00 pm		at Mercer	L 49–70	1–2	Hawkins Arena (3,437); Macon, GA
11/27/2015*; 11:00 am		vs. Chattanooga; Emerald Coast Classic	L 58–95	1–3	Northwest Florida State College (250); Niceville, FL
11/28/2015*; 11:00 am		vs. Chicago State; Emerald Coast Classic	W 66–64	2–3	Northwest Florida State College (250); Niceville, FL
12/01/2015*; 7:00 pm, ESPN3		at Evansville	L 56–88	2–4	Ford Center (3,702); Evansville, IN
12/03/2015*; 8:00 pm		Auburn–Montgomery	W 80–78	3–4	Dunn–Oliver Acadome (1,536); Montgomery, AL
12/13/2015*; 3:00 pm		at Jacksonville State	W 63–60	4–4	Pete Mathews Coliseum (1,103); Jacksonville, AL
12/16/2015*; 6:00 pm		at Elon	L 74–91	4–5	Alumni Gym (903); Elon, NC
12/20/2015*; 1:00 pm		at Coastal Carolina	L 65–68	4–6	HTC Center (1,510); Conway, SC
12/22/2015*; 1:00 pm		at Winthrop	L 84–92	4–7	Winthrop Coliseum (909); Rock Hill, SC
12/30/2015*; 7:00 pm		Fort Valley State	W 105–89	5–7	Dunn–Oliver Acadome (256); Montgomery, AL
SWAC regular season
01/02/2016; 7:30 pm		at Jackson State	L 61–68	5–8 (0–1)	Williams Assembly Center (799); Jackson, MS
01/04/2016; 7:30 pm		at Grambling State	L 81–84 ^{OT}	5–9 (0–2)	Fredrick C. Hobdy Assembly Center (426); Grambling, LA
01/09/2016; 7:30 pm		Mississippi Valley State	W 75–74 ^{OT}	6–9 (1–2)	Dunn–Oliver Acadome (872); Montgomery, AL
01/11/2016; 7:30 pm		Arkansas–Pine Bluff	L 55–59	6–10 (1–3)	Dunn–Oliver Acadome; Montgomery, AL
01/16/2016; 5:00 pm		Alabama A&M	L 75–80 ^{OT}	6–11 (1–4)	Dunn–Oliver Acadome; Montgomery, AL
01/23/2016; 4:00 pm		at Southern	L 69–73	6–12 (1–5)	F. G. Clark Center (1,891); Baton Rouge, LA
01/25/2016; 5:00 pm		at Alcorn State	L 72–77	6–13 (1–6)	Davey Whitney Complex (1,439); Lorman, MS
01/30/2016; 5:00 pm		Texas Southern	L 72–75	6–14 (1–7)	Dunn–Oliver Acadome (1,846); Montgomery, AL
02/01/2016; 7:30 pm		Prairie View A&M	W 83–77	7–14 (2–7)	Dunn–Oliver Acadome (1,546); Montgomery, AL
02/06/2016; 2:30 pm		at Mississippi Valley State	W 73–62	8–14 (3–7)	Leflore County Civic Center (793); Greenwood, MS
02/08/2016; 5:00 pm		at Arkansas–Pine Bluff	L 70–75 ^{OT}	8–15 (3–8)	K. L. Johnson Complex (981); Pine Bluff, AR
02/13/2016; 5:00 pm		at Alabama A&M	W 74–68	9–15 (4–8)	Elmore Gymnasium; Huntsville, AL
02/20/2016; 8:00 pm		Southern	W 77–68	10–15 (5–8)	Dunn–Oliver Acadome (1,324); Montgomery, AL
02/22/2016; 5:00 pm		Alcorn State	W 73–60	11–15 (6–8)	Dunn–Oliver Acadome; Montgomery, AL
02/27/2016; 7:30 pm		at Prairie View A&M	W 73–68	12–15 (7–8)	William J. Nicks Building (439); Prairie View, TX
02/29/2016; 7:30 pm		at Texas Southern	L 86–96	12–16 (7–9)	H&PE Arena; Houston, TX
03/03/2016; 5:00 pm		Jackson State	W 71–54	13–16 (8–9)	Dunn–Oliver Acadome (678); Montgomery, AL
03/05/2016; 7:30 pm		Grambling State	W 59–58	14–16 (9–9)	Dunn–Oliver Acadome (1,051); Montgomery, AL
SWAC tournament
03/10/2016; 8:30 pm	(5)	vs. (4) Southern; Quarterfinals	L 63–83	14–17	Toyota Center (1,022); Houston, TX
*Non-conference game. ^{#}Rankings from AP Poll. (#) Tournament seedings in parentheses. All times are in Central.
