= 2015–16 Alabama A&M Bulldogs basketball team =

American college basketball season

2015–16 Alabama A&M Bulldogs basketball
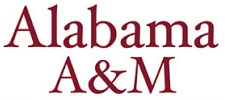
- Conference: Southwestern Athletic Conference
- Record: 11–18 (6–12 SWAC)
- Head coach: Willie Hayes (5th season)
- Assistant coaches: Dexter Holt; Mike Smith
- Home arena: Elmore Gymnasium

2015–16 SWAC men's basketball standings
	Conf.				Overall
Team	W		L	PCT	W		L	PCT
Texas Southern	16	–	2	.889	18	–	15	.545
Alcorn State*	13	–	5	.722	15	–	15	.500
Jackson State	12	–	6	.667	20	–	16	.556
Southern †	11	–	7	.611	22	–	13	.629
Alabama State	9	–	9	.500	14	–	17	.452
Prairie View A&M	7	–	11	.389	7	–	24	.226
Alabama A&M	6	–	12	.333	11	–	18	.379
Arkansas–Pine Bluff	6	–	12	.333	8	–	25	.242
Mississippi Valley State	6	–	12	.333	8	–	27	.229
Grambling State	4	–	14	.222	7	–	24	.226
† 2016 SWAC tournament winner *ineligible for postseason due to APR violations

The 2015–16 Alabama A&M Bulldogs basketball team represented Alabama Agricultural and Mechanical University during the 2015–16 NCAA Division I men's basketball season. The Bulldogs, led by fifth year head coach Willie Hayes, played their home games at Elmore Gymnasium and were members of the Southwestern Athletic Conference. The Bulldogs finished the season with a record of 11–18, 6–12 in conference and finished in a three way tie for seventh place. They lost to Texas Southern in the quarterfinals of the SWAC tournament.

== Roster ==
Number	Name	Position	Height	Weight	Year	Hometown
2	Christopher Thomas	Guard/Forward	6–7	210	Junior	Alabaster, Alabama
3	Jacob Perry	Guard	5–10	180	Senior	Huntsville, Alabama
4	Justin Colvin	Guard	6–3	180	Senior	Lithonia, Georgia
10	Rakiya Battle	Guard	6–0	170	Junior	Madison, Alabama
11	Matthew Cotton	Guard	5–10	185	Senior	Atlanta, Georgia
12	Marcus Merriweather	Guard	6–1	185	Junior	Pinson, Alabama
20	Zachary Jackson	Guard	6–4	205	Freshman	Pinson, Alabama
22	Tyler Davis	Guard	6–3	190	Senior	Madison, Alabama
23	Ladarius Tabb	Guard/Forward	6–5	190	Senior	Newbern, Alabama
24	Arthur Wade	Guard	6–4	190	Senior	Meridian, Mississippi
30	Adrian Edwards	Forward	6–4	195	Junior	Baton Rouge, Louisiana
33	Baryn Houston	Guard/Forward	6–7	200	Senior	Birmingham, Alabama
34	Jesse Johnson	Forward	6–7	220	Junior	Memphis, Tennessee
35	Nicholas West	Forward	6–10	215	Senior	LaGrange, Georgia
41	Rashawn Green	Guard	6–3	180	Freshman	Madison, Alabama
42	Quinterian McConico	Center/Forward	6–8	235	Junior	Birmingham, Alabama
44	Mohamed Sherif	Forward/Center	6–8	230	Freshman	Philadelphia, Pennsylvania
45	Brontae Harris	Guard	5–10	185	Freshman	Cullman, Alabama

== Schedule ==
Date time, TV	Rank^{#}	Opponent^{#}	Result	Record	Site (attendance) city, state
Regular season
11/13/2015*; 8:00 pm, ESPN3		at Tulane	W 68–67 ^{OT}	1–0	Devlin Fieldhouse (1,126); New Orleans, LA
11/19/2015*; 7:00 pm		Southeast Missouri State	W 74–56	2–0	Elmore Gymnasium (2,300); Huntsville, AL
11/21/2015*; 7:00 pm		Oakwood	W 97–89	3–0	Elmore Gymnasium (2,642); Huntsville, AL
11/24/2015*; 8:00 pm		at Jacksonville State	W 73–69	4–0	Pete Mathews Coliseum (1,019); Jacksonville, AL
11/28/2015*; 7:00 pm		at Murray State	L 61–63	4–1	CFSB Center (2,356); Murray, KY
12/12/2015*; 7:00 pm		at Saint Louis	L 58–75	4–2	Chaifetz Arena (5,419); St. Louis, MO
12/16/2015*; 8:00 pm, FCS		at WKU	L 70–79	4–3	E. A. Diddle Arena (3,109); Bowling Green, KY
12/22/2015*; 7:00 pm, ESPN3		at Evansville	L 70–91	4–4	Ford Center (4,746); Evansville, IN
12/29/2015*; 7:00 pm		at Ball State	L 62–63	4–5	John E. Worthen Arena (2,356); Muncie, IN
SWAC regular season
01/02/2016; 5:00 pm		at Grambling State	L 78–81 ^{OT}	4–6 (0–1)	Fredrick C. Hobdy Assembly Center (150); Grambling, LA
01/04/2016; 7:30 pm		at Jackson State	L 66–67	4–7 (0–2)	Williams Assembly Center (617); Jackson, MS
01/09/2016; 6:00 pm		Arkansas–Pine Bluff	W 85–70	5–7 (1–2)	Elmore Gymnasium; Huntsville, AL
01/11/2016; 7:30 pm		Mississippi Valley State	L 73–79	5–8 (1–3)	Elmore Gymnasium; Huntsville, AL
01/16/2016; 5:00 pm		at Alabama State	W 80–75 ^{OT}	6–8 (2–3)	Dunn–Oliver Acadome; Montgomery, AL
01/23/2016; 5:00 pm		at Alcorn State	L 58–63	6–9 (2–4)	Davey Whitney Complex (1,459); Lorman, MS
01/25/2016; 7:30 pm		at Southern	L 52–73	6–10 (2–5)	F. G. Clark Center (1,001); Baton Rouge, LA
01/30/2016; 6:00 pm		Prairie View A&M	W 83–69	7–10 (3–5)	Elmore Gymnasium (574); Huntsville, AL
02/01/2016; 7:30 pm		Texas Southern	L 66–71	7–11 (3–6)	Elmore Gymnasium; Huntsville, AL
02/06/2016; 7:30 pm		at Arkansas–Pine Bluff	W 71–66	8–11 (4–6)	K. L. Johnson Complex (1,402); Pine Bluff, AR
02/08/2016; 7:30 pm		at Mississippi Valley State	L 64–66	8–12 (4–7)	Leflore County Civic Center (762); Greenwood, MS
02/13/2016; 6:00 pm		Alabama State	L 68–74	8–13 (4–8)	Elmore Gymnasium; Huntsville, AL
02/20/2016; 6:00 pm		Alcorn State	L 58–62	8–14 (4–9)	Elmore Gymnasium (1,237); Huntsville, AL
02/22/2016; 7:30 pm		Southern	W 78–66	9–14 (5–9)	Elmore Gymnasium; Huntsville, AL
02/27/2016; 7:30 pm		at Texas Southern	L 54–77	9–15 (5–10)	H&PE Arena (2,342); Houston, TX
02/29/2016; 7:30 pm		at Prairie View A&M	L 65–85	9–16 (5–11)	William J. Nicks Building (683); Prairie View, TX
03/03/2016; 7:30 pm		Grambling State	L 58–65	9–17 (5–12)	Elmore Gymnasium (673); Huntsville, AL
03/05/2016; 6:00 pm		Jackson State	W 54–51	10–17 (6–12)	Elmore Gymnasium (1,112); Huntsville, AL
SWAC tournament
03/08/2016; 8:30 pm	(8)	vs. (9) Arkansas–Pine Bluff; First Round	W 61–53	11–17	Toyota Center; Houston, TX
03/09/16; 4:30 pm	(8)	vs. (1) Texas Southern; Quarterfinals	L 69–77	11–18	Toyota Center; Houston, TX
*Non-conference game. ^{#}Rankings from AP Poll. (#) Tournament seedings in parentheses. All times are in Central Time.
