= 2015–16 Texas Longhorns men's basketball team =

American college basketball season

2015–16 Texas Longhorns men's basketball

NCAA tournament, First Round
- Conference: Big 12 Conference
- Record: 20–13 (11–7 Big 12)
- Head coach: Shaka Smart (1st season)
- Assistant coaches: David Cason; Darrin Horn; Mike Morell
- Home arena: Frank Erwin Center

2015–16 Big 12 men's basketball standings
| | Conf. | | | | Overall |
| Team | W | | L | PCT | W | | L | PCT |
|---|---|---|---|---|---|---|---|---|
| No. 1 Kansas † | 15 | – | 3 | .833 | 33 | – | 5 | .868 |
| No. 8 West Virginia | 13 | – | 5 | .722 | 26 | – | 9 | .743 |
| No. 7 Oklahoma | 12 | – | 6 | .667 | 29 | – | 8 | .784 |
| Texas | 11 | – | 7 | .611 | 20 | – | 13 | .606 |
| No. 21 Baylor | 10 | – | 8 | .556 | 22 | – | 12 | .647 |
| No. 22 Iowa State | 10 | – | 8 | .556 | 23 | – | 12 | .657 |
| Texas Tech | 9 | – | 9 | .500 | 19 | – | 13 | .594 |
| Kansas State | 5 | – | 13 | .278 | 17 | – | 16 | .515 |
| Oklahoma State | 3 | – | 15 | .167 | 12 | – | 20 | .375 |
| TCU | 2 | – | 16 | .111 | 12 | – | 21 | .364 |
† 2016 Big 12 Tournament winner Rankings from AP poll

The 2015–16 Texas Longhorns men's basketball team represented the University of Texas at Austin in the 2015–16 NCAA Division I men's basketball season. They were led by head coach Shaka Smart who was in his first year. The team played their home games at the Frank Erwin Center in Austin, Texas, and were members of the Big 12 Conference. They finished the season 20–13, 11–7 in Big 12 play, to finish in fourth place. They lost in the quarterfinals of the Big 12 tournament to Baylor. They received an at-large bid to the NCAA tournament where they lost in the first round to Northern Iowa on a half-court buzzer-beater from Northern Iowas’s Paul Jesperson.

== Previous season ==
The Longhorns finished the season 20–14, 8–10 in Big 12 play, to finish in 7th place. They advanced to the second round of the Big 12 tournament where they lost to Iowa State. Texas received an at-large bid to the NCAA tournament in which they lost to Butler in the second round. On March 29, 2015, previous coach Rick Barnes was fired after 17 seasons at Texas, during which he compiled a record of 402–180, by far the most wins for a head coach in program history. Barnes accepted the same position at Tennessee four days later.

== Departures ==
| Name | Number | Pos. | Height | Weight | Year | Hometown | Notes |
|---|---|---|---|---|---|---|---|
| Jordan Barnett | 33 | F | 6'6" | 205 | Sophomore | St. Louis, MO | Transferred to Missouri |
| Damarcus Croaker | 5 | G | 6'2" | 190 | Sophomore | Orlando, FL | Transferred to Murray State |
| Jonathan Holmes | 10 | F | 6'8" | 240 | Senior | San Antonio, TX | Graduated |
| Tarale Murry | 40 | G | 6'2" | 187 | Senior | San Antonio, TX | Walk-on; graduated |
| Myles Turner | 52 | C | 7'0" | 240 | Freshman | Bedford, TX | Declare for the 2015 NBA draft |

== Recruiting ==
College recruiting information
| Name | Hometown | School | Height | Weight | Commit date |
|---|---|---|---|---|---|
| Eric Davis; SG | Saginaw, MI | Arthur Hill High School | 6 ft 3 in (1.91 m) | 165 lb (75 kg) | Sep 16, 2014 |
| Eric Davis; SG | Recruit ratings: Scout: Rivals: 247Sports: ESPN: | | | | |
| Kerwin Roach; PG | Houston, TX | North Shore Senior High School | 6 ft 3 in (1.91 m) | 160 lb (73 kg) | Oct 24, 2014 |
| Kerwin Roach; PG | Recruit ratings: Scout: Rivals: 247Sports: ESPN: | | | | |
| Tevin Mack; PF | Columbia, SC | Dreher High School | 6 ft 7 in (2.01 m) | 200 lb (91 kg) | May 19, 2015 |
| Tevin Mack; PF | Recruit ratings: Scout: Rivals: 247Sports: ESPN: | | | | |
Overall recruit ranking: Scout: 16 Rivals: 18 ESPN: 15
Note: In many cases, Scout, Rivals, 247Sports, On3, and ESPN may conflict in their listings of height and weight.; In these cases, the average was taken. ESPN grades are on a 100-point scale.; Sources: "Texas 2015 Basketball Commitments". Rivals.; "2015 Texas Basketball Commits". Scout.; "2015 Texas Basketball Commitments". ESPN.; "Scout.com Team Recruiting Rankings". Scout.; "2015 Team Ranking". Rivals.

=== Recruiting class of 2016 ===
College recruiting information (2016)
| Name | Hometown | School | Height | Weight | Commit date |
|---|---|---|---|---|---|
| Jacob Young; SG | Houston, TX | Yates High School | 6 ft 0 in (1.83 m) | 165 lb (75 kg) | Jun 30, 2015 |
| Jacob Young; SG | Recruit ratings: Scout: Rivals: 247Sports: ESPN: | | | | |
| James Banks III; C | Atlanta, GA | La Lumiere School | 6 ft 10 in (2.08 m) | 230 lb (100 kg) | Oct 8, 2015 |
| James Banks III; C | Recruit ratings: Scout: Rivals: 247Sports: ESPN: | | | | |
| Andrew Jones; SG | Irving, TX | MacArthur High School | 6 ft 4 in (1.93 m) | 183 lb (83 kg) | Dec 14, 2015 |
| Andrew Jones; SG | Recruit ratings: Scout: Rivals: 247Sports: ESPN: | | | | |
| Jarrett Allen; C | Austin, TX | Saint Stephen's Episcopal School | 6 ft 10 in (2.08 m) | 215 lb (98 kg) | Jun 3, 2016 |
| Jarrett Allen; C | Recruit ratings: Scout: Rivals: 247Sports: ESPN: | | | | |
Overall recruit ranking: Scout: 6 Rivals: 16 ESPN: 11
Note: In many cases, Scout, Rivals, 247Sports, On3, and ESPN may conflict in their listings of height and weight.; In these cases, the average was taken. ESPN grades are on a 100-point scale.; Sources: "2016 Texas Basketball Commitment List". Rivals.; "2016 Texas Basketball Recruiting Prospects". Scout.; "2016 Player Commits". ESPN.; "Scout.com Team Recruiting Rankings". Scout.; "2016 Team Ranking". Rivals.

== Roster ==
2015–16 Texas Longhorns men's basketball team
Players
Coaches

| Pos. | # | Name | Height | Weight | Year | Previous school | Hometown |
|---|---|---|---|---|---|---|---|
| G/F | 0 | Tevin Mack | 6 ft 7 in (2.01 m) | 210 lb (95 kg) | Fr | Dreher | Columbia, SC |
| G | 1 | Isaiah Taylor | 6 ft 1 in (1.85 m) | 185 lb (84 kg) | Jr | The Village School | Hayward, CA |
| G | 2 | Demarcus Holland | 6 ft 3 in (1.91 m) | 190 lb (86 kg) | Sr | Naaman Forest | Garland, TX |
| G | 3 | Javan Felix | 5 ft 11 in (1.8 m) | 205 lb (93 kg) | Sr | St. Augustine | New Orleans, LA |
| F | 4 | Danny Newsome (W) | 6 ft 10 in (2.08 m) | 190 lb (86 kg) | RS Jr | Langham Creek | Houston, TX |
| G | 5 | Kendall Yancy | 6 ft 3 in (1.91 m) | 210 lb (95 kg) | Jr | Berkner | Richardson, TX |
| G | 10 | Eric Davis Jr. | 6 ft 2 in (1.88 m) | 185 lb (84 kg) | Fr | Arthur Hill | Saginaw, MI |
| G | 12 | Kerwin Roach | 6 ft 4 in (1.93 m) | 170 lb (77 kg) | Fr | North Shore | Houston, TX |
| F | 21 | Connor Lammert | 6 ft 10 in (2.08 m) | 235 lb (107 kg) | Sr | Churchill | San Antonio, TX |
| G | 25 | Joe Schwartz (W) | 6 ft 2 in (1.88 m) | 180 lb (82 kg) | So | Vanguard College Prep | Waco, TX |
| F | 30 | Ryan McClurg (W) | 6 ft 6 in (1.98 m) | 230 lb (104 kg) | RS So | Seven Lakes | Katy, TX |
| F | 32 | Shaquille Cleare | 6 ft 8 in (2.03 m) | 285 lb (129 kg) | Jr | The Village School | Andros, BS |
| C | 44 | Prince Ibeh | 6 ft 11 in (2.11 m) | 265 lb (120 kg) | Sr | Naaman Forest | Garland, TX |
| C | 55 | Cameron Ridley | 6 ft 10 in (2.08 m) | 290 lb (132 kg) | Sr | Bush | Richmond, TX |

Head coach

- Shaka Smart (Kenyon)

Assistant coach(es)

- David Cason (Illinois State)
- Darrin Horn (Western Kentucky)
- Mike Morell (Milligan)

Legend

- (C) Team captain
- (S) Suspended
- (I) Ineligible
- (W) Walk-on
- Injured
- Current redshirt

Roster

== Schedule ==
| Date time, TV | Rank^{#} | Opponent^{#} | Result | Record | Site (attendance) city, state |
Exhibition
| November 6, 2015*; 5:00 pm, LHN | | Tarleton State | W 95–61 | | Frank Erwin Center (2,391); Austin, TX |
Regular season
| November 13, 2015*; 9:00 pm, ESPN | | vs. Washington; China Opener | L 71–77 | 0–1 | Mercedes-Benz Arena (7,188); Shanghai, CN |
| November 21, 2015*; 7:00 pm, LHN | | Texas A&M–Corpus Christi; Battle 4 Atlantis Opening Round | W 67–56 | 1–1 | Frank Erwin Center (11,313); Austin, TX |
| November 25, 2015*; 6:00 pm, AXS TV | | vs. No. 25 Texas A&M; Battle 4 Atlantis Quarterfinals | L 73–84 | 1–2 | Imperial Arena (1,647); Nassau, BS |
| November 26, 2015*; 6:00 pm, AXS TV | | vs. Washington; Battle 4 Atlantis 2nd Round Consolation | W 82–70 | 2–2 | Imperial Arena (1,316); Nassau, BS |
| November 27, 2015*; 6:00 pm, AXS TV | | vs. Michigan; Battle 4 Atlantis 5th Place Game | L 72–78 | 2–3 | Imperial Arena (1,357); Nassau, BS |
| December 1, 2015*; 7:00 pm, LHN | | Texas–Arlington | W 80–73 ^{OT} | 3–3 | Frank Erwin Center (9,646); Austin, TX |
| December 4, 2015*; 8:00 pm, LHN | | Samford | W 59–49 | 4–3 | Frank Erwin Center (10,762); Austin, TX |
| December 8, 2015*; 7:00 pm, LHN | | UTSA | W 116–50 | 5–3 | Frank Erwin Center (9,657); Austin, TX |
| December 12, 2015*; 4:15 pm, ESPN | | No. 3 North Carolina | W 84–82 | 6–3 | Frank Erwin Center (16,540); Austin, TX |
| December 15, 2015*; 7:00 pm, LHN | | Appalachian State | W 67–55 | 7–3 | Frank Erwin Center (10,529); Austin, TX |
| December 19, 2015*; 10:30 pm, ESPN2 | | at Stanford | W 75–73 | 8–3 | Maples Pavilion (3,930); Stanford, CA |
| December 29, 2015*; 8:00 pm, ESPN2 | | UConn | L 66–71 | 8–4 | Frank Erwin Center (13,931); Austin, TX |
| January 2, 2016; 1:00 pm, ESPNU | | at Texas Tech | L 74–82 | 8–5 (0–1) | United Supermarkets Arena (12,689); Lubbock, TX |
| January 5, 2016; 7:00 pm, LHN | | Kansas State | W 60–57 | 9–5 (1–1) | Frank Erwin Center (10,620); Austin, TX |
| January 9, 2016; 6:00 pm, ESPNU | | at TCU | L 57–58 | 9–6 (1–2) | Schollmaier Arena (6,673); Fort Worth, TX |
| January 12, 2016; 8:00 pm, ESPN2 | | No. 17 Iowa State | W 94–91 ^{OT} | 10–6 (2–2) | Frank Erwin Center (10,663); Austin, TX |
| January 16, 2016; 5:00 pm, ESPN2 | | Oklahoma State | W 74-69 | 11–6 (3–2) | Frank Erwin Center (13,241); Austin, TX |
| January 20, 2016; 6:00 pm, ESPNU | | at No. 6 West Virginia | W 56–49 | 12–6 (4–2) | WVU Coliseum (9,881); Morgantown, WV |
| January 23, 2016; 1:00 pm, ESPN | | at No. 3 Kansas | L 67–76 | 12–7 (4–3) | Allen Fieldhouse (16,300); Lawrence, KS |
| January 26, 2016; 7:00 pm, LHN | | TCU | W 71–54 | 13–7 (5–3) | Frank Erwin Center (11,282); Austin, TX |
| January 30, 2016*; 11:00 am, ESPN2 | | Vanderbilt; Big 12/SEC Challenge | W 72–58 | 14–7 | Frank Erwin Center (13,041); Austin, TX |
| February 1, 2016; 8:00 pm, ESPN | | at No. 15 Baylor | W 67–59 | 15–7 (6–3) | Ferrell Center (6,064); Waco, TX |
| February 6, 2016; 1:00 pm, LHN | | Texas Tech | W 69–59 | 16–7 (7–3) | Frank Erwin Center (14,951); Austin, TX |
| February 8, 2016; 8:00 pm, ESPN | No. 24 | at No. 3 Oklahoma | L 60–63 | 16–8 (7–4) | Lloyd Noble Center (10,014); Norman, OK |
| February 13, 2016; 7:30 pm, ESPN | No. 24 | at No. 14 Iowa State | L 75–85 | 16–9 (7–5) | Hilton Coliseum (14,384); Ames, IA |
| February 16, 2016; 6:00 pm, ESPN2 | No. 24 | No. 10 West Virginia | W 85–78 | 17–9 (8–5) | Frank Erwin Center (12,284); Austin, TX |
| February 20, 2016; 1:00 pm, ESPN | No. 24 | No. 25 Baylor | L 64–78 | 17–10 (8–6) | Frank Erwin Center (16,540); Austin, TX |
| February 22, 2016; 6:00 pm, ESPNU | No. 25 | at Kansas State | W 71–70 | 18–10 (9–6) | Bramlage Coliseum (11,629); Manhattan, KS |
| February 27, 2016; 1:00 pm, CBS | No. 25 | No. 3 Oklahoma | W 76–63 | 19–10 (10–6) | Frank Erwin Center (16,540); Austin, TX |
| February 29, 2016; 8:00 pm, ESPN | No. 23 | No. 1 Kansas | L 56–86 | 19–11 (10–7) | Frank Erwin Center (16,540); Austin, TX |
| March 4, 2016; 8:00 pm, ESPN2 | No. 23 | at Oklahoma State | W 62–50 | 20–11 (11–7) | Gallagher-Iba Arena (4,023); Stillwater, OK |
Big 12 Tournament
| March 10, 2016; 11:30 am, ESPN2 | (4) No. 23 | vs. (5) No. 22 Baylor; Quarterfinals | L 61–75 | 20–12 | Sprint Center (18,972); Kansas City, MO |
NCAA tournament
| March 18, 2016; 8:50 pm, TBS | (6 W) | vs. (11 W) Northern Iowa; First Round | L 72–75 | 20–13 | Chesapeake Energy Arena (15,279); Oklahoma City, OK |
*Non-conference game. ^{#}Rankings from AP Poll. (#) Tournament seedings in parentheses. W=West Region. All times are in Central Time.

== Rankings ==
Ranking movement Legend: ██ Increase in ranking. ██ Decrease in ranking. ██ Not ranked the previous week.
| Poll | Pre | Wk 2 | Wk 3 | Wk 4 | Wk 5 | Wk 6 | Wk 7 | Wk 8 | Wk 9 | Wk 10 | Wk 11 | Wk 12 | Wk 13 | Wk 14 | Wk 15 | Wk 16 | Wk 17 | Wk 18 | Post | Final |
|---|---|---|---|---|---|---|---|---|---|---|---|---|---|---|---|---|---|---|---|---|
| AP | RV | RV | NR | NR | NR | RV | RV | RV | NR | NR | NR | NR | RV | 24 | 24 | 25 | 23 | 23 | NR | *N/A |
| Coaches | RV | NR | NR | NR | NR | RV | RV | RV | NR | NR | NR | RV | RV | 25 | 25 | 25 | 22 | 22 | 22 | RV |

*AP does not release post-NCAA tournament rankings

== See also ==
- 2015–16 Texas Longhorns women's basketball team
