= 2015–16 Southern Jaguars basketball team =

American college basketball season

2015–16 Southern Jaguars basketball
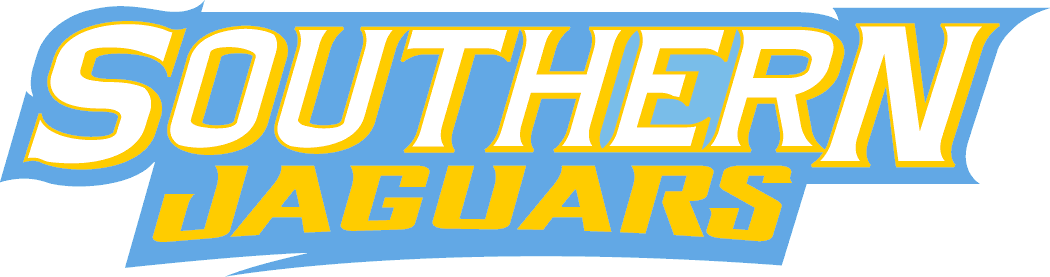

SWAC tournament champions

NCAA tournament, First Four
- Conference: Southwestern Athletic Conference
- Record: 22–13 (11–7 SWAC)
- Head coach: Roman Banks (5th season)
- Assistant coaches: Morris Scott (5th season); Rodney Kirschner (5th season); Jethro Hillman (2nd season)
- Home arena: F. G. Clark Center

2015–16 SWAC men's basketball standings
	Conf.				Overall
Team	W		L	PCT	W		L	PCT
Texas Southern	16	–	2	.889	18	–	15	.545
Alcorn State*	13	–	5	.722	15	–	15	.500
Jackson State	12	–	6	.667	20	–	16	.556
Southern †	11	–	7	.611	22	–	13	.629
Alabama State	9	–	9	.500	14	–	17	.452
Prairie View A&M	7	–	11	.389	7	–	24	.226
Alabama A&M	6	–	12	.333	11	–	18	.379
Arkansas–Pine Bluff	6	–	12	.333	8	–	25	.242
Mississippi Valley State	6	–	12	.333	8	–	27	.229
Grambling State	4	–	14	.222	7	–	24	.226
† 2016 SWAC tournament winner *ineligible for postseason due to APR violations

The 2015–16 Southern Jaguars basketball team represented Southern University during the 2015–16 NCAA Division I men's basketball season. The Jaguars, led by fifth year head coach Roman Banks, played their home games at the F. G. Clark Center and were members of the Southwestern Athletic Conference. They finished the season 22–13, 11–7 in SWAC play to finish in fourth place. They defeated Alabama State, Texas Southern, and Jackson State to be champions of the SWAC tournament. They earned the conference's automatic bid to the NCAA tournament where they lost in the First Four to Holy Cross.

== Roster ==
Number	Name	Position	Height	Weight	Year	Hometown
0	Christopher Hyder	Guard	5–11	170	Senior	Dallas, Texas
1	Londell King	Forward	6–7	185	Freshman	Tallahassee, Florida
2	Adrian Rodgers	Guard	6–4	205	Senior	Atlanta, Georgia
3	Trelun Banks	Guard	6–1	170	Junior	Shreveport, Louisiana
4	Chris Thomas	Guard	6–4	190	Sophomore	Baton Rouge, Louisiana
5	Brendon Genaway	Guard	5–10	160	Freshman	Houston, Texas
10	Shawn Prudhomme	Forward	6–4	215	Junior	Beaumont, Texas
11	Rashad Andrews	Guard	6–5	190	Sophomore	Brooklyn, New York
12	Jarred Sam	Forward	6–9	210	Sophomore	Baton Rouge, Louisiana
12	Grant Ellis	Guard	6–4	170	Junior	Newark, New Jersey
20	Thomas Pierre-Louis	Forward	6–9	210	Senior	Miami, Florida
21	Patrick Smith	Forward	6–7	195	Junior	Farmerville, Louisiana
23	LaQuentin Collins	Guard	6–2	170	Sophomore	Monroe, Louisiana
30	DeRias Johnson	Guard	6–4	170	Freshman	Dallas, Texas
32	D'Andrian Allen	Forward	6–8	225	Junior	Toronto, Ontario, Canada
50	Tony Nunn	Forward	6–9	220	Junior	Salisbury, North Carolina

== Schedule ==
Date time, TV	Rank^{#}	Opponent^{#}	Result	Record	Site (attendance) city, state
Non-conference regular season
11/13/15*; 7:00 pm, SECN+		at Arkansas	L 68–86	0–1	Bud Walton Arena (14,158); Fayetteville, AR
11/16/15*; 7:00 pm		at Mississippi State	W 76–72	1–1	Humphrey Coliseum (5,895); Starkville, MS
11/19/15*; 7:00 pm		Tulane	W 90–82	2–1	F. G. Clark Center (2,356); Baton Rouge, LA
11/24/15*; 7:00 pm		Dillard	W 79–65	3–1	F. G. Clark Center (2,188); Baton Rouge, LA
11/30/15*; 7:00 pm		Paul Quinn	W 96–63	4–1	F. G. Clark Center (677); Baton Rouge, LA
12/04/15*; 7:00 pm		at Southeastern Louisiana	W 73–69	5–1	University Center (1,506); Hammond, LA
12/08/15*; 8:00 pm, Cox7		at Grand Canyon; Global Basketball Classic	L 56–70	5–2	GCU Arena (5,637); Phoenix, AZ
12/10/15*; 8:00 pm, RSRM		at Wyoming; Global Basketball Classic	W 68–58	6–2	Arena-Auditorium (4,989); Laramie, WY
12/13/15*; 3:00 pm		Ecclesia	W 96–69	7–2	F. G. Clark Center (319); Baton Rouge, LA
12/15/15*; 7:00 pm, ASN		at Memphis	L 67–72	7–3	FedExForum (10,752); Memphis, TN
12/18/15*; 6:30 pm		at Louisiana Tech	L 76–83	7–4	Thomas Assembly Center (2,519); Ruston, LA
12/21/15*; 3:30 pm		vs. North Carolina Central; Global Basketball Classic	W 68–63	8–4	Cox Pavilion; Paradise, NV
12/22/15*; 3:30 pm		vs. Omaha; Global Basketball Classic	L 53–74	8–5	Cox Pavilion; Paradise, NV
SWAC regular season
01/02/16; 7:30 pm		at Texas Southern	L 66–88	8–6 (0–1)	H&PE Arena (2,467); Houston, TX
01/04/16; 7:30 pm		at Prairie View A&M	L 65–71	8–7 (0–2)	William J. Nicks Building (331); Prairie View, TX
01/09/16; 5:00 pm		Grambling State	W 66–61	9–7 (1–2)	F. G. Clark Center (4,292); Baton Rouge, LA
01/11/16; 8:00 pm, CST		Jackson State	W 74–66	10–7 (2–2)	F. G. Clark Center (1,579); Baton Rouge, LA
01/16/16; 7:30 pm		at Arkansas–Pine Bluff	W 69–55	11–7 (3–2)	K. L. Johnson Complex (2,785); Pine Bluff, AR
01/18/16; 7:30 pm		at Mississippi Valley State	W 67–54	12–7 (4–2)	Leflore County Civic Center; Greenwood, MS
01/23/16; 5:00 pm		Alabama State	W 73–69	13–7 (5–2)	F. G. Clark Center (1,891); Baton Rouge, LA
01/25/16; 8:00 pm, ESPNU		Alabama A&M	W 73–52	14–7 (6–2)	F. G. Clark Center (1,001); Baton Rouge, LA
01/30/16; 5:30 pm		Alcorn State	W 75–64	15–7 (7–2)	F. G. Clark Center (1,982); Baton Rouge, LA
02/06/16; 3:00 pm		at Grambling State	W 79–66	16–7 (8–2)	Fredrick C. Hobdy Assembly Center (791); Grambling, LA
02/08/16; 7:30 pm		at Jackson State	L 80–81	16–8 (8–3)	Williams Assembly Center (1,391); Jackson, MS
02/13/16; 5:30 pm, CST		Arkansas–Pine Bluff	W 66–58	17–8 (9–3)	F. G. Clark Center (623); Baton Rouge, LA
02/15/16; 5:00 pm, ESPNU		Mississippi Valley State	W 97–64	18–8 (10–3)	F. G. Clark Center (599); Baton Rouge, LA
02/20/16; 6:00 pm		at Alabama State	L 68–77	18–9 (10–4)	Dunn–Oliver Acadome (1,324); Montgomery, AL
02/22/16; 5:30 pm		at Alabama A&M	L 66–78	18–10 (10–5)	Elmore Gymnasium (1,507); Huntsville, AL
02/27/16; 3:30 pm		at Alcorn State	L 56–70	18–11 (10–6)	Davey Whitney Complex (1,275); Lorman, MS
03/03/16; 7:30 pm, CST		Texas Southern	W 84–79	19–11 (11–6)	F. G. Clark Center (2,795); Baton Rouge, LA
03/05/16; 5:30 pm		Prairie View A&M	L 71–79	19–12 (11–7)	F. G. Clark Center (2,933); Baton Rouge, LA
SWAC tournament
03/10/2016; 8:30 pm	(4)	vs. (5) Alabama State; Quarterfinals	W 83–63	20–12	Toyota Center (1,022); Houston, TX
03/11/2016; 8:30 pm	(4)	vs. (1) Texas Southern; Semifinals	W 81–73	21–12	Toyota Center (2,008); Houston, TX
03/12/2016; 5:30 pm, ESPNU	(4)	vs. (3) Jackson State; Championship	W 54–53	22–12	Toyota Center; Houston, TX
NCAA tournament
03/16/2016*; 5:40 pm, truTV	(16 W)	vs. (16 W) Holy Cross; First Four	L 55–59	22–13	UD Arena (12,582); Dayton, OH
*Non-conference game. ^{#}Rankings from AP Poll. (#) Tournament seedings in parentheses. W=West Region. All times are in Central Time.
