= 2015–16 Jackson State Tigers basketball team =

American college basketball season

2015–16 Jackson State Tigers basketball

CIT, Second round
- Conference: Southwestern Athletic Conference
- Record: 20–16 (12–6 SWAC)
- Head coach: Wayne Brent (3rd season)
- Assistant coaches: Cason Burk; De'Suan Dixon; Ben Walker
- Home arena: Williams Assembly Center

2015–16 SWAC men's basketball standings
	Conf.				Overall
Team	W		L	PCT	W		L	PCT
Texas Southern	16	–	2	.889	18	–	15	.545
Alcorn State*	13	–	5	.722	15	–	15	.500
Jackson State	12	–	6	.667	20	–	16	.556
Southern †	11	–	7	.611	22	–	13	.629
Alabama State	9	–	9	.500	14	–	17	.452
Prairie View A&M	7	–	11	.389	7	–	24	.226
Alabama A&M	6	–	12	.333	11	–	18	.379
Arkansas–Pine Bluff	6	–	12	.333	8	–	25	.242
Mississippi Valley State	6	–	12	.333	8	–	27	.229
Grambling State	4	–	14	.222	7	–	24	.226
† 2016 SWAC tournament winner *ineligible for postseason due to APR violations

The 2015–16 Jackson State Tigers basketball team represented Jackson State University during the 2015–16 NCAA Division I men's basketball season. The Tigers, led by third year head coach Wayne Brent, played their home games at the Williams Assembly Center and were members of the Southwestern Athletic Conference. They finished the season 20–16, 12–6 in SWAC play to finish in third place. They defeated Prairie View A&M and Mississippi Valley State to advance to the championship game of the SWAC tournament where they lost to Southern. They were invited to the CollegeInsider.com Tournament where they defeated Sam Houston State in the first round to advance to the second round where they lost to Grand Canyon.

== Roster ==
Number	Name	Position	Height	Weight	Year	Hometown
1	Chace Franklin	Guard	6–5	185	Junior	Desoto, Texas
2	Haudrick Hilaire	Guard	6–1	195	Junior	Guadeloupe
3	Yettra Specks	Guard	5–10	163	Junior	Monroe, Louisiana
4	Anfernee Felton	Guard	5–9	155	Junior	Clinton, Mississippi
5	Paris Collins	Guard	6–4	172	Sophomore	San Antonio, Texas
10	Raeford Worsham	Guard	6–4	192	Senior	Waynesboro, Mississippi
11	Lindsey Hunter, IV	Guard	5–10	165	Freshman	Detroit, Michigan
12	Kaven Bernard	Forward	6–5	195	Senior	Napoleonville, Louisiana
13	Javeres Brent	Guard	6–3	190	Junior	Jackson, Mississippi
15	Jalen Manumaleuga	Guard	5–11	170	Freshman	Pacific Pines, Queensland, Australia
22	Treshawn Bolden	Forward	6–8	235	Junior	Jackson, Mississippi
23	Marcus Love	Guard	6–2	185	Junior	Jackson, Mississippi
24	Altez Davis	Forward	6–7	185	Junior	Danville, Illinois
25	Jesse Love	Guard	6–1	190	Junior	Jackson, Mississippi
30	Troy Stancil	Guard	6–2	170	Freshman	Washington, D.C.
31	Dontaveon Robinson	Guard	6–4	180	Junior	Jackson, Mississippi
33	Kenneth Taylor	Guard	6–3	185	Junior	Freeport, Bahamas
35	Janarius Middleton	Forward	6–8	218	Junior	Greenwood, Mississippi

== Schedule ==
Date time, TV	Rank^{#}	Opponent^{#}	Result	Record	Site (attendance) city, state
Regular season
11/13/2015*; 7:00 pm, P12N		at Oregon	L 52–80	0–1	Matthew Knight Arena (5,577); Eugene, OR
11/17/2015*; 2:00 pm		at Southern Miss	W 78–60	1–1	Reed Green Coliseum (2,933); Hattiesburg, MS
11/20/2015*; 7:00 pm, FSSW+		at No. 20 Baylor; Global Sports Shootout	L 60–77	1–2	Ferrell Center (5,973); Waco, TX
11/22/2015*; 2:00 pm		at Arkansas State; Global Sports Shootout	L 69–78	1–3	Convocation Center (789); Jonesboro, AR
11/24/2015*; 6:00 pm		at Tennessee Tech	L 82–86 ^{OT}	1–4	Eblen Center (779); Cookeville, TN
11/27/2015*; 7:00 pm		Savannah State; Global Sports Shootout	W 69–42	2–4	Williams Assembly Center (587); Jackson, MS
11/29/2015*; 12:30 pm, FS1		at Marquette	L 61–80	2–5	BMO Harris Bradley Center (11,764); Milwaukee, WI
12/02/2015*; 7:30 pm		Fisk	W 94–59	3–5	Williams Assembly Center (921); Jackson, MS
12/04/2015*; 6:30 pm		at Louisiana Tech	L 88–95 ^{2OT}	3–6	Thomas Assembly Center (3,504); Ruston, LA
12/12/2015*; 5:00 pm		Blue Mountain	W 75–37	4–6	Williams Assembly Center (497); Jackson, MS
12/15/2015*; 7:00 pm, ESPN3		at Miami (OH)	L 53–64	4–7	Millett Hall (1,119); Oxford, OH
12/17/2015*; 7:00 pm		at Ohio	L 67–72	4–8	Convocation Center (5,183); Athens, OH
12/30/2015*; 7:30 pm		Southeastern Louisiana	W 89–66	5–8	Williams Assembly Center (703); Jackson, MS
SWAC regular season
01/02/2016; 5:30 pm		Alabama State	W 68–61	6–8 (1–0)	Williams Assembly Center (799); Jackson, MS
01/04/2016; 7:30 pm		Alabama A&M	W 67–66	7–8 (2–0)	Williams Assembly Center (617); Jackson, MS
01/09/2016; 5:30 pm		at Alcorn State	W 80–71 ^{OT}	8–8 (3–0)	Davey Whitney Complex (1,821); Lorman, MS
01/11/2016; 7:30 pm		at Southern	L 66–74	8–9 (3–1)	F. G. Clark Center (1,579); Baton Rouge, LA
01/16/2016; 5:30 pm		Texas Southern	L 65–71	8–10 (3–2)	Williams Assembly Center (1,591); Jackson, MS
01/18/2016; 7:30 pm		Prairie View A&M	W 60–57	9–10 (4–2)	Williams Assembly Center (1,523); Jackson, MS
01/23/2016; 5:30 pm		Grambling State	W 60–45	10–10 (5–2)	Williams Assembly Center (1,499); Jackson, MS
01/30/2016; 4:00 pm		at Mississippi Valley State	W 77–62	11–10 (6–2)	Leflore County Civic Center (1,998); Greenwood, MS
02/01/2016; 7:30 pm		at Arkansas–Pine Bluff	W 66–53	12–10 (7–2)	K. L. Johnson Complex (2,245); Pine Bluff, AR
02/06/2016; 5:30 pm		Alcorn State	L 64–72	12–11 (7–3)	Williams Assembly Center (3,099); Jackson, MS
02/08/2016; 7:30 pm		Southern	W 81–80	13–11 (8–3)	Williams Assembly Center (1,391); Jackson, MS
02/13/2016; 5:30 pm		at Texas Southern	L 60–76	13–12 (8–4)	H&PE Arena (2,642); Houston, TX
02/15/2016; 7:30 pm		at Prairie View A&M	W 80–66	14–12 (9–4)	William J. Nicks Building (687); Prairie View, TX
02/20/2016; 5:30 pm		at Grambling State	W 61–58	15–12 (10–4)	Fredrick C. Hobdy Assembly Center (749); Grambling, LA
02/27/2016; 5:30 pm		Mississippi Valley State	W 60–49	16–12 (11–4)	Williams Assembly Center (2,193); Jackson, MS
02/29/2016; 7:30 pm		Arkansas–Pine Bluff	W 67–56	17–12 (12–4)	Williams Assembly Center (701); Jackson, MS
03/03/2016; 7:30 pm		at Alabama State	L 54–71	17–13 (12–5)	Dunn–Oliver Acadome (678); Montgomery, AL
03/05/2016; 5:30 pm		at Alabama A&M	L 51–54	17–14 (12–6)	Elmore Gymnasium (1,112); Huntsville, AL
SWAC tournament
03/10/2016; 2:30 pm	(3)	vs. (6) Prairie View A&M; Quarterfinals	W 69–41	18–14	Toyota Center (1,217); Houston, TX
03/11/2016; 2:30 pm	(3)	vs. (7) Mississippi Valley State; Semifinals	W 74–68	19–14	Toyota Center (776); Houston, TX
03/12/2016; 5:30 pm, ESPNU	(3)	vs. (4) Southern; Championship game	L 53–54	19–15	Toyota Center; Houston, TX
CIT
03/14/2016*; 6:30 pm		at Sam Houston State; First round	W 81–77 ^{OT}	20–15	Bernard Johnson Coliseum (376); Huntsville, TX
03/17/2016*; 8:00 pm		at Grand Canyon; Second round	L 54–64	20–16	GCU Arena (7,015); Phoenix, AZ
*Non-conference game. ^{#}Rankings from AP Poll. (#) Tournament seedings in parentheses. All times are in Central Time.
