= 2015–16 Alcorn State Braves basketball team =

American college basketball season

2015–16 Alcorn State Braves basketball
- Conference: Southwestern Athletic Conference
- Record: 15–15 (13–5 SWAC)
- Head coach: Montez Robinson (1st season)
- Assistant coaches: Terrance Chatman; Alexander Ireland; Cabral Huff
- Home arena: Davey Whitney Complex

2015–16 SWAC men's basketball standings
	Conf.				Overall
Team	W		L	PCT	W		L	PCT
Texas Southern	16	–	2	.889	18	–	15	.545
Alcorn State*	13	–	5	.722	15	–	15	.500
Jackson State	12	–	6	.667	20	–	16	.556
Southern †	11	–	7	.611	22	–	13	.629
Alabama State	9	–	9	.500	14	–	17	.452
Prairie View A&M	7	–	11	.389	7	–	24	.226
Alabama A&M	6	–	12	.333	11	–	18	.379
Arkansas–Pine Bluff	6	–	12	.333	8	–	25	.242
Mississippi Valley State	6	–	12	.333	8	–	27	.229
Grambling State	4	–	14	.222	7	–	24	.226
† 2016 SWAC tournament winner *ineligible for postseason due to APR violations

The 2015–16 Alcorn State Braves basketball team represented Alcorn State University during the 2015–16 NCAA Division I men's basketball season. The Braves, led by first year head coach Montez Robinson, played their home games at the Davey Whitney Complex in Lorman, Mississippi and were members of the Southwestern Athletic Conference. The Braves finished the season 15–15, 13–5 in SWAC play to finish in second place. They lost to Mississippi Valley State in the quarterfinals of the SWAC tournament.

The Braves were ineligible for NCAA postseason play due to APR violations.

== Previous season ==
The Braves finished the 2014–15 season 6–26, 4–14 in SWAC play to finish in ninth place. They advanced to the quarterfinals of the SWAC tournament where they lost to Texas Southern.

On January 6, 2015, head coach Luther Riley took a personal leave of absence. Assistant coach Shawn Pepp led the Braves in Riley's absence. On March 23, 2015, it was announced that Riley's expiring contract would not be renewed.

On April 27, 2015, Montez Robinson was named head coach.

== Roster ==
Number	Name	Position	Height	Year	Hometown
0	Tyrel Hunt	Forward	6–5	Junior	Queens, New York
1	Malachy Onwudiegwu	Guard	6–2	Junior	Baltimore, Maryland
2	Shawn Willett	Guard	6–3	Freshman	Palm Bay, Florida
3	Tamarcio Wilson	Guard	6–2	Senior	Lexington, Mississippi
4	DeAndré Davis	Forward	6–7	Junior	Spotsylvania, Virginia
10	Devanté Hampton	Guard	6–1	Senior	Memphis, Tennessee
11	Juwan Henderson	Guard	5–9	Sophomore	Atlanta, Georgia
12	Rahamanh Katumbusi II	Guard	6–2	Freshman	Chicago, Illinois
22	TyQuayion Smith	Forward	6–6	Freshman	Jackson, Louisiana
23	Keynan Pittman	Forward	6–10	Senior	Wilmington, North Carolina
24	Reginald Johnson	Forward	6–5	Sophomore	Monroe, Louisiana
30	Marquis Vance	Forward	6–7	Junior	Tchula, Mississippi
35	Octavius "Trey" Brown	Forward	6–8	Senior	Ruleville, Mississippi

== Schedule ==
Date time, TV	Rank^{#}	Opponent^{#}	Result	Record	Site (attendance) city, state
Exhibition
11/12/2015*; 7:30 pm		Tougaloo	W 122–117 ^{2OT}		Davey Whitney Complex (3,521); Lorman, MS
Non-conference regular season
11/19/2015*; 7:00 pm, Cox7		at Grand Canyon	L 46–79	0–1	GCU Arena (4,720); Phoenix, AZ
11/22/2015*; 7:00 pm		at UTEP; Corpus Christi Coastal Classic	L 66–88	0–2	Don Haskins Center (6,005); El Paso, TX
11/24/2015*; 7:00 pm		at Portland; Corpus Christi Coastal Classic	L 65–97	0–3	Chiles Center (1,194); Portland, OR
11/24/2015*; 12:00 pm		vs. Oakland; Corpus Christi Coastal Classic	W 84–51	0–4	American Bank Center (103); Corpus Christi, TX
11/28/2015*; 12:00 pm		vs. Florida A&M; Corpus Christi Coastal Classic	L 71–73	0–5	American Bank Center (168); Corpus Christi, TX
11/30/2015*; 7:00 pm, BTN		at Indiana	L 70–112	0–6	Assembly Hall (17,472); Bloomington, IN
12/05/2015*; 4:30 pm, BTN		at Mercer	L 43–68	0–7	Hawkins Arena (2,963); Macon, GA
12/14/2015*; 7:30 pm		Blue Mountain	W 68–60	1–7	Davey Whitney Complex (58); Lorman, MS
12/19/2015*; 4:00 pm		vs. Tennessee State; HBCU Heritage Hardwood Classic	L 76–81	1–8	Verties Sails Gymnasium (176); Nashville, TN
12/21/2015*; 6:00 pm		at UT Martin	L 47–70	1–9	Skyhawk Arena (904); Martin, TN
12/30/2015*; 4:00 pm		Louisiana College	W 81–69	2–9	Davey Whitney Complex (51); Lorman, MS
SWAC regular season
01/02/2016; 5:30 pm		at Prairie View A&M	W 73–70	3–9 (1–0)	William J. Nicks Building (322); Prairie View, TX
01/04/2016; 7:30 pm		at Texas Southern	W 74–58	3–10 (1–1)	H&PE Arena (1,245); Houston, TX
01/09/2016; 5:30 pm		Jackson State	L 71–80 ^{OT}	3–11 (1–2)	Davey Whitney Complex (1,821); Lorman, MS
01/11/2016; 7:30 pm		Grambling State	W 69–53	4–11 (2–2)	Davey Whitney Complex (954); Lorman, MS
01/16/2016; 4:00 pm		at Mississippi Valley State	W 93–87 ^{3OT}	5–11 (3–2)	Leflore County Civic Center (2,982); Greenwood, MS
01/18/2016; 7:30 pm		at Arkansas–Pine Bluff	W 73–65	6–11 (4–2)	K. L. Johnson Complex (2,689); Pine Bluff, AR
01/23/2016; 5:30 pm		Alabama A&M	W 63–58	7–11 (5–2)	Davey Whitney Complex (1,459); Lorman, MS
01/25/2016; 7:30 pm		Alabama State	W 77–72	8–11 (6–2)	Davey Whitney Complex (1,439); Lorman, MS
01/30/2016; 5:30 pm		at Southern	L 64–75	8–12 (6–3)	F. G. Clark Center (1,982); Baton Rouge, LA
02/06/2016; 5:30 pm		at Jackson State	W 72–64	9–12 (7–3)	Williams Assembly Center (3,099); Jackson, MS
02/08/2016; 7:30 pm		at Grambling State	W 66–63	10–12 (8–3)	Fredrick C. Hobdy Assembly Center (821); Grambling, LA
02/13/2016; 5:30 pm		Mississippi Valley State	W 72–71 ^{OT}	11–12 (9–3)	Davey Whitney Complex; Lorman, MS
02/15/2016; 7:30 pm		Arkansas–Pine Bluff	W 79–60	12–12 (10–3)	Davey Whitney Complex (1,213); Lorman, MS
02/20/2016; 6:00 pm		at Alabama A&M	W 62–58	13–12 (11–3)	Elmore Gymnasium (1,237); Huntsville, AL
02/22/2016; 5:00 pm		at Alabama State	L 59–73	13–13 (11–4)	Dunn–Oliver Acadome; Montgomery, AL
02/27/2016; 5:30 pm		Southern	W 70–56	14–13 (12–4)	Davey Whitney Complex (1,275); Lorman, MS
03/03/2016; 7:30 pm		Prairie View A&M	W 81–64	15–13 (13–4)	Davey Whitney Complex (1,295); Lorman, MS
03/05/2016; 5:30 pm		Texas Southern	L 66–76	15–14 (13–5)	Davey Whitney Complex; Lorman, MS
SWAC tournament
03/09/16; 2:30 pm	(2)	vs. (7) Mississippi Valley State	L 61–64	15–15	Toyota Center (339); Houston, TX
*Non-conference game. ^{#}Rankings from AP Poll. (#) Tournament seedings in parentheses. All times are in Central Time.
