= 2015–16 Prairie View A&M Panthers basketball team =

American college basketball season

2015–16 Prairie View A&M Panthers basketball
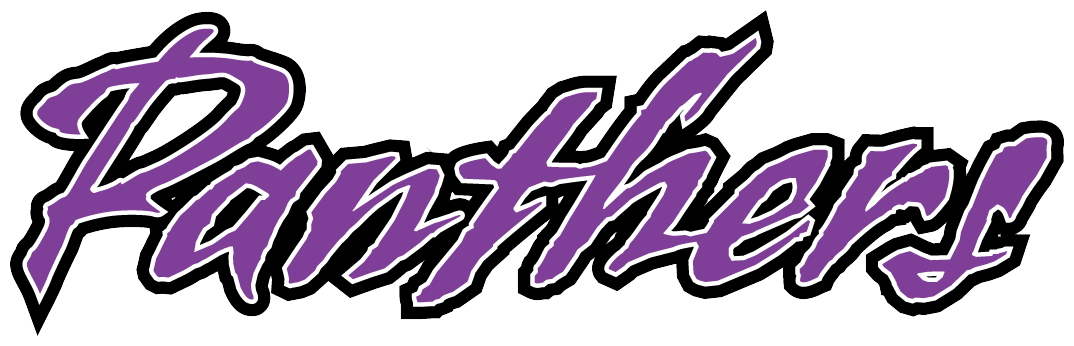
- Conference: Southwestern Athletic Conference
- Record: 7–24 (7–11 SWAC)
- Head coach: Byron Rimm II (10th season)
- Assistant coaches: Byron Smith (3rd season); Ryan Price (2nd season); Keenan Curry (2nd season)
- Home arena: William Nicks Building

2015–16 SWAC men's basketball standings
	Conf.				Overall
Team	W		L	PCT	W		L	PCT
Texas Southern	16	–	2	.889	18	–	15	.545
Alcorn State*	13	–	5	.722	15	–	15	.500
Jackson State	12	–	6	.667	20	–	16	.556
Southern †	11	–	7	.611	22	–	13	.629
Alabama State	9	–	9	.500	14	–	17	.452
Prairie View A&M	7	–	11	.389	7	–	24	.226
Alabama A&M	6	–	12	.333	11	–	18	.379
Arkansas–Pine Bluff	6	–	12	.333	8	–	25	.242
Mississippi Valley State	6	–	12	.333	8	–	27	.229
Grambling State	4	–	14	.222	7	–	24	.226
† 2016 SWAC tournament winner *ineligible for postseason due to APR violations

The 2015–16 Prairie View A&M Panthers basketball team represented Prairie View A&M University during the 2015–16 NCAA Division I men's basketball season. The Panthers, led by tenth year head coach Byron Rimm II, played their home games at the William Nicks Building and were members of the Southwestern Athletic Conference. They finished the season 7–24, 7–11 in SWAC play to finish in sixth place. They lost in the quarterfinals of the SWAC tournament to Jackson State.

On January 27, 2016, following a 1–16 start to the season, head coach Byron Rimm II resigned. Assistant coach Byron Smith was named interim coach. On March 14, Prairie View A&M removed the interim coach tag and named Byron Smith head coach.

== Roster ==
Number	Name	Position	Height	Weight	Year	Hometown
0	Jacoby Green	Guard	6–4	175	Senior	Houston, Texas
1	Jayrn Johnson	Guard	6–3	180	Junior	Dallas, Texas
2	Avery Lomax	Guard	5–9	160	Senior	Desoto, Texas
3	Jordan Giddings	Guard	6–0	180	R-Junior	Dallas, Texas
4	Dominique Shaw	Guard	6–4	220	Junior	Lufkin, Texas
5	Tevin Bellinger	Guard	6–0	180	Junior	Hutto, Texas
10	Lavonne Davis	Forward	6–8	215	Freshman	Cleveland, Ohio
12	Malik Amos	Guard	6–2	170	Freshman	Katy, Texas
13	Xavion Turnage	Guard	6–2	170	Freshman	Dallas, Texas
14	Zachary Hamilton	Forward	6–4	200	Sophomore	Houston, Texas
15	Noah Wilson	Forward	6–6	230	R-Sophomore	Laredo, Texas
21	Tyler Miller	Forward	6–6	220	Freshman	Milwaukee, Wisconsin
22	Charleston Dobbs	Forward	6–8	210	Senior	Dumas, Arkansas
23	Admassu Williams	Forward	6–8	240	Junior	Santa Monica, California
24	Jordan Lumpkins	Forward	6–4	215	Junior	New Orleans, Louisiana
25	Ja'Donta Blakely	Guard	6–2	180	Junior	Lake Charles, Louisiana
30	Karim York	Forward	6–9	225	Senior	Austin, Texas
31	Austin Allen	Forward	6–6	180	Freshman	Desoto, Texas
33	Travis Barnes	Forward	6–8	220	Junior	Wilson, North Carolina

== Recruits ==
College recruiting information
Name	Hometown	School	Height	Weight	Commit date
Xavion Turnage; PG	Dallas, TX	Kimball School	6 ft 2 in (1.88 m)	170 lb (77 kg)	Nov 9, 2014
Xavion Turnage; PG	Recruit ratings: Scout: Rivals: (54)				
Malik Amos; SG	Katy, TX	Cinco Rancho High School	6 ft 3 in (1.91 m)	180 lb (82 kg)	Nov 11, 2014
Malik Amos; SG	Recruit ratings: Scout: Rivals: (NR)				
Lavonne Davis; PF	Phoenix, AZ	Hillcrest Academy	6 ft 2 in (1.88 m)	170 lb (77 kg)	Apr 20, 2015
Lavonne Davis; PF	Recruit ratings: Scout: Rivals: (NR)				
Overall recruit ranking:
Note: In many cases, Scout, Rivals, 247Sports, On3, and ESPN may conflict in their listings of height and weight.; In these cases, the average was taken. ESPN grades are on a 100-point scale.; Sources: "2015 Team Ranking". Rivals.

== Schedule ==
Date time, TV	Rank^{#}	Opponent^{#}	Result	Record	Site (attendance) city, state
Regular season
11/13/15*; 8:00 pm, WTVR 6.3		at VCU; 2K Sports Classic	L 50–75	0–1	Siegel Center (7,637); Richmond, VA
11/18/15*; 6:00 pm, ESPN3		at Houston; 2K Sports Classic	L 69–110	0–2	Hofheinz Pavilion (1,223); Houston, TX
11/20/15*; 6:00 pm		at Bryant; 2K Sports Classic	L 58–71	0–3	Chace Athletic Center (545); Smithfield, RI
11/21/15*; 3:00 pm		vs. Radford; 2K Sports Classic	L 56–64	0–4	Chace Athletic Center (114); Smithfield, RI
11/25/15*; 7:00 pm, BTN		at Wisconsin	L 67–85	0–5	Kohl Center (17,287); Madison, WI
11/28/15*; 9:00 pm		at UNLV	L 62–80	0–6	Thomas & Mack Center (10,858); Las Vegas, NV
12/02/15*; 8:30 pm, FSSW+		at No. 25 Baylor	L 41–80	0–7	Ferrell Center (4,572); Waco, TX
12/11/15*; 7:00 pm, FSSW+		at TCU	L 55–73	0–8	Schollmaier Arena (4,658); Fort Worth, TX
12/14/15*; 7:00 pm, ESPN3		at Tulane	L 49–63	0–9	Devlin Fieldhouse (1,999); New Orleans, LA
12/16/15*; 7:00 pm		Texas State	L 44–62	0–10	William J. Nicks Building (268); Prairie View, TX
12/22/15*; 7:00 pm, BTN+		at Nebraska	L 50–81	0–11	Pinnacle Bank Arena (14,754); Lincoln, NE
12/28/15*; 6:30 pm		at Louisiana Tech	L 58–77	0–12	Thomas Assembly Center (2,528); Ruston, LA
01/02/16; 7:30 pm		Alcorn State	L 70–73	0–13 (0–1)	William J. Nicks Building (322); Prairie View, TX
01/04/16; 7:30 pm		Southern	W 71–65	1–13 (1–1)	William J. Nicks Building (331); Prairie View, TX
01/09/16; 7:30 pm		at Texas Southern	L 38–64	1–14 (1–2)	H&PE Arena (5,287); Houston, TX
01/16/16; 5:00 pm		at Grambling State	L 63–66	1–15 (1–3)	Fredrick C. Hobdy Assembly Center (743); Grambling, LA
01/18/16; 7:30 pm		at Jackson State	L 57–60	1–16 (1–4)	Williams Assembly Center (1,523); Jackson, MS
01/23/16; 5:00 pm		Arkansas–Pine Bluff	L 44–45	1–17 (1–5)	William J. Nicks Building (718); Prairie View, TX
01/25/16; 7:30 pm		Mississippi Valley State	L 73–76	1–18 (1–6)	William J. Nicks Building (958); Prairie View, TX
01/30/16; 6:00 pm		at Alabama A&M	L 69–83	1–19 (1–7)	Elmore Gymnasium (574); Huntsville, AL
02/01/16; 7:30 pm		at Alabama State	L 77–83	1–20 (1–8)	Dunn–Oliver Acadome (1,546); Montgomery, AL
02/06/16; 7:00 pm		Texas Southern	W 59–55	2–20 (2–8)	William J. Nicks Building (3,527); Prairie View, TX
02/13/16; 5:00 pm		Grambling State	W 60–56	3–20 (3–8)	William J. Nicks Building (313); Prairie View, TX
02/15/16; 7:30 pm		Jackson State	L 66–80	3–21 (3–9)	William J. Nicks Building (687); Prairie View, TX
02/20/16; 7:30 pm		at Arkansas–Pine Bluff	W 57–55	4–21 (4–9)	K. L. Johnson Complex (798); Pine Bluff, AR
02/22/16; 7:30 pm		at Mississippi Valley State	W 63–61	5–21 (5–9)	Leflore County Civic Center (549); Greenwood, MS
02/27/16; 5:00 pm		Alabama State	L 68–73	5–22 (5–10)	William J. Nicks Building (439); Prairie View, TX
02/29/16; 7:30 pm		Alabama A&M	W 85–65	6–22 (6–10)	William J. Nicks Building (683); Prairie View, TX
03/03/16; 7:30 pm		at Alcorn State	L 64–81	6–23 (6–11)	Davey Whitney Complex (1,295); Lorman, MS
03/05/16; 5:00 pm		at Southern	W 79–71	7–23 (7–11)	F. G. Clark Center (2,933); Baton Rouge, LA
SWAC tournament
03/10/16; 2:30 pm	(6)	vs. (3) Jackson State; Quarterfinals	L 51–69	7–24	Toyota Center (1,217); Houston, TX
*Non-conference game. ^{#}Rankings from AP Poll. (#) Tournament seedings in parentheses. All times are in Central Time.
