= 2015–16 Mississippi Valley State Delta Devils basketball team =

American college basketball season

2015–16 Mississippi Valley State Delta Devils basketball
- Conference: Southwestern Athletic Conference
- Record: 8–27 (6–12 SWAC)
- Head coach: Andre Payne (2nd season)
- Assistant coaches: Eric Strothers; Adaiah Curry; Darion Harris
- Home arena: Leflore County Civic Center

2015–16 SWAC men's basketball standings
| | Conf. | | | | Overall |
| Team | W | | L | PCT | W | | L | PCT |
|---|---|---|---|---|---|---|---|---|
| Texas Southern | 16 | – | 2 | .889 | 18 | – | 15 | .545 |
| Alcorn State* | 13 | – | 5 | .722 | 15 | – | 15 | .500 |
| Jackson State | 12 | – | 6 | .667 | 20 | – | 16 | .556 |
| Southern † | 11 | – | 7 | .611 | 22 | – | 13 | .629 |
| Alabama State | 9 | – | 9 | .500 | 14 | – | 17 | .452 |
| Prairie View A&M | 7 | – | 11 | .389 | 7 | – | 24 | .226 |
| Alabama A&M | 6 | – | 12 | .333 | 11 | – | 18 | .379 |
| Arkansas–Pine Bluff | 6 | – | 12 | .333 | 8 | – | 25 | .242 |
| Mississippi Valley State | 6 | – | 12 | .333 | 8 | – | 27 | .229 |
| Grambling State | 4 | – | 14 | .222 | 7 | – | 24 | .226 |
† 2016 SWAC tournament winner *ineligible for postseason due to APR violations

The 2015–16 Mississippi Valley State Delta Devils basketball team represented Mississippi Valley State University during the 2015–16 NCAA Division I men's basketball season. The Delta Devils, led by second year head coach Andre Payne, were members of the Southwestern Athletic Conference. Due to continued renovations to their normal home stadium, the Harrison HPER Complex, they played their home games at the Leflore County Civic Center in Greenwood, Mississippi. They finished the season 8–27, 6–12 in SWAC play to finish in a three way tie for seventh place. They defeated Grambling State and Alcorn State to advance to the semifinals of the SWAC tournament where they lost to Jackson State.

== Roster ==
| Number | Name | Position | Height | Weight | Year | Hometown |
|---|---|---|---|---|---|---|
| 0 | Vacha Vzaughn | Forward | 6–4 | 210 | Junior | Memphis, Tennessee |
| 1 | Marcus Romain | Guard | 6–2 | 174 | Junior | Brooklyn, New York |
| 2 | Ronald Strother, Jr. | Forward | 6–5 | 175 | Freshman | Birmingham, Alabama |
| 3 | Damian Young | Forward | 6–3 | | Junior | Grayson, Georgia |
| 5 | Rashaan Surles | Guard | 6–4 | 175 | Junior | Flossmoor, Illinois |
| 10 | Ta'Jay Henry | Forward | 6–4 | 215 | Junior | Queens, New York |
| 11 | Kylan Phillips | Guard | 5–11 | 164 | Freshman | Memphis, Tennessee |
| 12 | Kevin Portillo | Forward | 6–5 | 228 | Sophomore | Miami, Florida |
| 13 | Jabari Alex | Forward | 6–4 | 188 | Senior | Chicago, Illinois |
| 15 | Dwain Whitfield | Forward | 6–6 | 230 | Sophomore | Forrest City, Arkansas |
| 20 | Dusan Langura | Guard | 6–3 | 183 | Sophomore | Romont, Switzerland |
| 22 | Michael Matlock | Forward | 6–6 | 221 | Junior | Memphis, Tennessee |
| 23 | Latrell Love | Center | 6–5 | 218 | Senior | Minneapolis, Minnesota |
| 24 | Isaac Williams | Guard | 6–4 | 181 | Junior | Powder Springs, Georgia |
| 32 | Bennett Davis | Center | 6–9 | 275 | Junior | Raymond, Mississippi |
| | Vintavious Coppage | Forward | 6–7 | 184 | Freshman | Memphis, Tennessee |
| | Thomas Oglesby | Guard | 5–10 | 170 | Freshman | Atlanta, Georgia |
| | James Pierce | Guard | 6–1 | 172 | Freshman | Houston, Texas |
| | John Sanders | Guard | 6–1 | 190 | Junior | Brandon, Mississippi |

== Schedule ==
| Date time, TV | Rank^{#} | Opponent^{#} | Result | Record | Site (attendance) city, state |
Non-conference Regular season
| 11/14/2015*; 7:00 pm | | at Nebraska | L 51–97 | 0–1 | Pinnacle Bank Arena (15,489); Lincoln, NE |
| 11/19/2015*; 7:00 pm | | at Air Force; Air Force Classic | L 64–65 | 0–2 | Clune Arena (1,129); Colorado Springs, CO |
| 11/21/2015*; 7:00 pm | | at New Mexico State; Air Force Classic | L 46–85 | 0–3 | Pan American Center (4,346); Las Cruces, NM |
| 11/23/2015*; 7:00 pm, Cox7 | | at Grand Canyon | L 60–94 | 0–4 | GCU Arena (4,613); Phoenix, AZ |
| 11/25/2015*; 7:00 pm, BYUtv | | at BYU | L 68–75 | 0–5 | Marriott Center (15,467); Provo, UT |
| 11/28/2015*; 7:00 pm | | vs. Robert Morris; Air Force Classic | L 64–67 | 0–6 | Eblen Center (755); Cookeville, TN |
| 11/29/2015*; 2:00 pm | | at Tennessee Tech; Air Force Classic | L 64–101 | 0–7 | Eblen Center (605); Cookeville, TN |
| 12/01/2015*; 7:00 pm | | at Duquesne | L 77–91 | 0–8 | Palumbo Center (1,079); Pittsburgh, PA |
| 12/03/2015*; 7:00 pm | | at North Carolina Central | L 79–86 | 0–9 | McLendon–McDougald Gymnasium (1,133); Durham, NC |
| 12/06/2015*; 7:00 pm | | at Seattle | L 72–84 | 0–10 | KeyArena (1,276); Seattle, WA |
| 12/12/2015*; 3:00 pm, ESPN3 | | at Evansville | L 60–95 | 0–11 | Ford Center (4,251); Evansville, IN |
| 12/15/2015*; 7:00 pm | | at Northwestern | L 48–78 | 0–12 | Welsh-Ryan Arena (5,704); Evanston, IL |
| 12/17/2015*; 11:30 am | | at North Texas | L 74–87 | 0–13 | The Super Pit (2,180); Denton, TX |
| 12/29/2015*; 7:00 pm | | at Hawaii | L 48–77 | 0–14 | Stan Sheriff Center (5,431); Honolulu, HI |
SWAC regular season
| 01/04/2016; 7:30 pm | | Arkansas–Pine Bluff | W 66–60 | 1–14 (1–0) | Leflore County Civic Center (1,468); Greenwood, MS |
| 01/09/2016; 7:30 pm | | at Alabama State | L 74–75 ^{OT} | 1–15 (1–1) | Dunn–Oliver Acadome (872); Montgomery, AL |
| 01/11/2016; 7:30 pm | | at Alabama A&M | W 79–73 | 2–15 (2–1) | Elmore Gymnasium; Huntsville, AL |
| 01/16/2016; 4:00 pm | | Alcorn State | L 87–93 ^{3OT} | 2–16 (2–2) | Leflore County Civic Center (2,982); Greenwood, MS |
| 01/18/2016; 7:30 pm | | Southern | L 54–67 | 2–17 (2–3) | Leflore County Civic Center; Greenwood, MS |
| 01/23/2016; 7:30 pm | | at Texas Southern | L 60–75 | 2–18 (2–4) | H&PE Arena (2,468); Houston, TX |
| 01/25/2016; 7:30 pm | | at Prairie View A&M | W 76–73 | 3–18 (3–4) | William J. Nicks Building (958); Prairie View, TX |
| 01/30/2016; 4:00 pm | | Jackson State | L 62–77 | 3–19 (3–5) | Leflore County Civic Center (1,998); Greenwood, MS |
| 02/01/2016; 7:30 pm | | Grambling State | W 72–59 | 4–19 (4–5) | Leflore County Civic Center (932); Greenwood, MS |
| 02/06/2016; 4:00 pm | | Alabama State | L 62–72 | 4–20 (4–6) | Leflore County Civic Center (793); Greenwood, MS |
| 02/08/2016; 7:30 pm | | Alabama A&M | W 66–64 | 5–20 (5–6) | Leflore County Civic Center (762); Greenwood, MS |
| 02/13/2016; 5:30 pm | | at Alcorn State | L 71–72 ^{OT} | 5–21 (5–7) | Davey Whitney Complex; Lorman, MS |
| 02/15/2016; 5:00 pm | | at Southern | L 64–97 | 5–22 (5–8) | F. G. Clark Center (599); Baton Rouge, LA |
| 02/20/2016; 4:00 pm | | Texas Southern | L 67–98 | 5–23 (5–9) | Harris Arena (898); Moorehead, MS |
| 02/22/2016; 7:30 pm | | Prairie View A&M | L 61–63 | 5–24 (5–10) | Leflore County Civic Center (549); Greenwood, MS |
| 02/27/2016; 5:30 pm | | at Jackson State | L 49–60 | 5–25 (5–11) | Williams Assembly Center (2,193); Jackson, MS |
| 02/29/2016; 7:30 pm | | at Grambling State | W 58–57 | 6–25 (6–11) | Fredrick C. Hobdy Assembly Center (1,752); Grambling, LA |
| 03/05/2016; 7:30 pm | | at Arkansas–Pine Bluff | L 71–78 | 6–26 (6–12) | K. L. Johnson Complex (1,999); Pine Bluff, AR |
SWAC tournament
| 03/08/2016; 2:30 pm | (7) | vs. (10) Grambling State; First round | W 87–73 | 7–26 | Toyota Center; Houston, TX |
| 03/09/16; 2:30 pm | (7) | vs. (2) Alcorn State; Quarterfinals | W 64–61 | 8–26 | Toyota Center (339); Houston, TX |
| 03/11/16; 2:30 pm | (7) | vs. (3) Jackson State; Semifinals | L 68–74 | 8–27 | Toyota Center (776); Houston, TX |
*Non-conference game. ^{#}Rankings from AP Poll. (#) Tournament seedings in parentheses. All times are in Central Time.
