= 2015–16 Grambling State Tigers men's basketball team =

American college basketball season

2015–16 Grambling State Tigers men's basketball
- Conference: Southwestern Athletic Conference
- Record: 7–24 (4–14 SWAC)
- Head coach: Shawn Walker (2nd season)
- Assistant coaches: Ray Martin; Kenyon Alston
- Home arena: Fredrick C. Hobdy Assembly Center

2015–16 SWAC men's basketball standings
	Conf.				Overall
Team	W		L	PCT	W		L	PCT
Texas Southern	16	–	2	.889	18	–	15	.545
Alcorn State*	13	–	5	.722	15	–	15	.500
Jackson State	12	–	6	.667	20	–	16	.556
Southern †	11	–	7	.611	22	–	13	.629
Alabama State	9	–	9	.500	14	–	17	.452
Prairie View A&M	7	–	11	.389	7	–	24	.226
Alabama A&M	6	–	12	.333	11	–	18	.379
Arkansas–Pine Bluff	6	–	12	.333	8	–	25	.242
Mississippi Valley State	6	–	12	.333	8	–	27	.229
Grambling State	4	–	14	.222	7	–	24	.226
† 2016 SWAC tournament winner *ineligible for postseason due to APR violations

The 2015–16 Grambling State Tigers men's basketball team represented Grambling State University during the 2015–16 NCAA Division I men's basketball season. The Tigers, led by second year head coach Shawn Walker, played their home games at the Fredrick C. Hobdy Assembly Center and were members of the Southwestern Athletic Conference. The Tigers finished the regular season with a 7–24 overall record, 4–14 in SWAC play to finish in last place. They lost to Mississippi Valley State in the first round of the SWAC tournament.

== Roster ==
Number	Name	Position	Height	Year	Hometown
0	Ervin Mitchell	Guard	6–4	Junior	New York City, New York
1	Michael Bethea, Jr.	Guard/Forward	6–6	Junior	Staten Island, New York
2	Nigel Ribeiro	Guard	5–10	Freshman	Chesapeake, Virginia
3	Deonte Hearns	Guard/Forward	6–5	Junior	Cocoa, Florida
4	Remond Brown	Guard	6–4	Junior	Monroe, Louisiana
5	Jefkins Agyeman-Budu	Guard	6–5	Sophomore	Staten Island, New York
10	Chase Comier	Guard	6–0	Junior	Baltimore, Maryland
11	Arnold Richmond	Guard	5–11	Senior	Suitland, Maryland
12	Kyle Williams	Center	6–9	Sophomore	Long Island, New York
13	Ugur Hortum	Center	6–11	Junior	Istanbul, Turkey
21	Jack Ocwieja	Center	6–11	Junior	Melbourne, Australia
22	Carlton Lowe	Guard	6–2	Junior	Alexandria, Louisiana
24	Mark Gray	Forward	6–6	Senior	New Iberia, Louisiana
32	Velario Altheimer	Guard	6–2	Junior	Jonesboro, Louisiana

== Schedule ==
Date time, TV	Rank^{#}	Opponent^{#}	Result	Record	Site (attendance) city, state
Regular season
11/13/2015*; 8:00 pm, ESPN3		at East Carolina	L 53–61	0–1	Williams Arena (5,083); Greenville, NC
11/14/2015*; 2:00 pm		at Mid-Atlantic	W 85–26	1–1	Chesson Gym (514); Elizabeth City, NC
11/17/2015*; 7:00 pm, BTN		at Ohio State; Hoophall Miami Invitational	L 55–82	1–2	Value City Arena (10,779); Columbus, OH
11/19/2015*; 7:00 pm, ESPN3		at Memphis; Hoophall Miami Invitational	L 65–83	1–3	FedEx Forum (11,286); Memphis, TN
11/21/2015*; 7:00 pm		Louisiana Tech; Hoophall Miami Invitational	L 67–86	1–4	Fredrick C. Hobdy Assembly Center (1,504); Grambling, LA
11/25/2015*; 7:00 pm		at Texas–Arlington; Hoophall Miami Invitational	L 40–73	1–5	College Park Center (1,601); Arlington, TX
11/30/2015*; 7:00 pm		Selma	W 98–53	2–5	Fredrick C. Hobdy Assembly Center (150); Grambling, LA
12/02/2015*; 7:00 pm, FS2		at Marquette	L 49–95	2–6	BMO Harris Bradley Center (11,618); Milwaukee, WI
12/12/2015*; 7:00 pm		vs. Tennessee State; HBCU Heritage Hardweood Classic	L 52–64	2–7	Kroc Center (1,482); Chicago, IL
12/17/2015*; 7:00 pm		at North Carolina A&T	L 47–61	2–8	Corbett Sports Center (467); Greensboro, NC
12/19/2015*; 6:00 pm, ESPN3		at Virginia Tech	L 52–87	2–9	Cassell Coliseum (4,649); Blacksburg, VA
01/02/2016; 5:00 pm		Alabama A&M	W 81–78 ^{OT}	3–9 (1–0)	Fredrick C. Hobdy Assembly Center (150); Grambling, LA
01/04/2016; 7:30 pm		Alabama State	W 84–81 ^{OT}	4–9 (2–0)	Fredrick C. Hobdy Assembly Center (426); Grambling, LA
01/06/2016*; 6:00 pm		Jarvis Christian	W 80–58	5–9	Fredrick C. Hobdy Assembly Center (117); Grambling, LA
01/09/2016; 4:00 pm		at Southern	L 61–66	5–10 (2–1)	F. G. Clark Center (4,292); Baton Rouge, LA
01/11/2016; 7:30 pm		at Alcorn State	L 53–69	5–11 (2–2)	Davey Whitney Complex (954); Lorman, MS
01/16/2016; 7:30 pm		Prairie View A&M	W 66–63	6–11 (3–2)	Fredrick C. Hobdy Assembly Center (743); Grambling, LA
01/18/2016; 7:30 pm		Texas Southern	L 54–69	6–12 (3–3)	Fredrick C. Hobdy Assembly Center (537); Grambling, LA
01/23/2016; 7:30 pm		at Jackson State	L 45–60	6–13 (3–4)	Williams Assembly Center (1,499); Jackson, MS
01/30/2016; 7:30 pm		at Arkansas–Pine Bluff	L 59–63	6–14 (3–5)	K. L. Johnson Complex (2,819); Pine Bluff, AR
02/01/2016; 7:30 pm		at Mississippi Valley State	L 59–72	6–15 (3–6)	Leflore County Civic Center (932); Greenwood, MS
02/06/2016; 7:30 pm		Southern	L 66–79	6–16 (3–7)	Fredrick C. Hobdy Assembly Center (791); Grambling, LA
02/08/2016; 7:30 pm		Alcorn State	L 63–66	6–17 (3–8)	Fredrick C. Hobdy Assembly Center (821); Grambling, LA
02/13/2016; 7:30 pm		at Prairie View A&M	L 56–60	6–18 (3–9)	William J. Nicks Building (313); Prairie View, TX
02/15/2016; 7:30 pm		at Texas Southern	L 72–79	6–19 (3–10)	H&PE Arena (1,426); Houston, TX
02/20/2016; 7:30 pm		Jackson State	L 58–61	6–20 (3–11)	Fredrick C. Hobdy Assembly Center (749); Grambling, LA
02/27/2016; 7:30 pm		Arkansas–Pine Bluff	W 53–51	6–21 (3–12)	Fredrick C. Hobdy Assembly Center (759); Grambling, LA
02/29/2016; 7:30 pm		Mississippi Valley State	L 57–58	6–22 (3–13)	Fredrick C. Hobdy Assembly Center (1,752); Grambling, LA
03/03/2016; 7:30 pm		at Alabama A&M	W 65–58	7–22 (4–13)	Elmore Gymnasium (673); Huntsville, AL
03/05/2016; 7:30 pm		at Alabama State	L 58–59	7–23 (4–14)	Dunn–Oliver Acadome (1,051); Montgomery, AL
SWAC tournament
03/08/2016; 2:30 pm	(10)	vs. (7) Mississippi Valley State; First round	L 73–87	7–24	Toyota Center; Houston, TX
*Non-conference game. ^{#}Rankings from AP Poll. (#) Tournament seedings in parentheses. All times are in Central Time.
