= 2015–16 Arkansas–Pine Bluff Golden Lions men's basketball team =

American college basketball season

2015–16 Arkansas–Pine Bluff Golden Lions men's basketball
- Conference: Southwestern Athletic Conference
- Record: 8–25 (6–12 SWAC)
- Head coach: George Ivory (8th season)
- Assistant coaches: Kenneth Broyles; Richard Cannon; Jarvis Gunter
- Home arena: K. L. Johnson Complex

2015–16 SWAC men's basketball standings
	Conf.				Overall
Team	W		L	PCT	W		L	PCT
Texas Southern	16	–	2	.889	18	–	15	.545
Alcorn State*	13	–	5	.722	15	–	15	.500
Jackson State	12	–	6	.667	20	–	16	.556
Southern †	11	–	7	.611	22	–	13	.629
Alabama State	9	–	9	.500	14	–	17	.452
Prairie View A&M	7	–	11	.389	7	–	24	.226
Alabama A&M	6	–	12	.333	11	–	18	.379
Arkansas–Pine Bluff	6	–	12	.333	8	–	25	.242
Mississippi Valley State	6	–	12	.333	8	–	27	.229
Grambling State	4	–	14	.222	7	–	24	.226
† 2016 SWAC tournament winner *ineligible for postseason due to APR violations

The 2015–16 Arkansas–Pine Bluff Golden Lions men's basketball team represented the University of Arkansas at Pine Bluff during the 2015–16 NCAA Division I men's basketball season. The Golden Lions, led by eighth year head coach George Ivory, played their home games at the K. L. Johnson Complex and were members of the Southwestern Athletic Conference. The Golden Lions finished the season with an 8–25 overall record, 6–12 in conference and finished in a three-way tie for seventh place. They lost to Alabama A&M in the first round of the SWAC tournament.

== Roster ==
Number	Name	Position	Height	Weight	Year	Hometown
1	Charles Jackson	Guard/Forward	6–5	210	Freshman	Cleveland, MS
3	Thaddeus Handley, Jr.	Forward	6–3	180	Junior	Pine Bluff, AR
10	Jaquan Lynch	Guard	6–3	180	Senior	Brooklyn, NY
12	Marquis Cunningham	Center/Forward	6–8	200	Junior	Bronx, NY
13	Austin Cox	Guard	6–4	175	Sophomore	Belleville, IL
14	Marcus Wallace	Guard	6–3	180	Freshman	Jackson, MS
15	Trent Whiting	Forward	6–7	205	Senior	Des Arc, AR
21	Larry Johnson	Guard	6–2	175	Senior	Greenwood, MS
22	JoVaughn Love	Guard/Forward	6–9	220	Senior	Pine Bluff, AR
23	Ghiavonni Robinson	Guard	6–3	190	Junior	Itta Bena, MS
25	Chauncy Parker	Center	6-8	225	Senior	West Memphis, AR
30	Deshon Bayless	Forward / Center	6–8	220	Junior	Laurel, MS
34	Devin Berry	Forward	6–7	220	Junior	Columbus, MS
40	J'Bruen Sprinkle	Guard	6–2	175	Freshman	White Hall, AR
52	David Tillman	Center	6–10	215	Junior	Houston, TX

== Schedule ==
Date time, TV	Rank^{#}	Opponent^{#}	Result	Record	Site (attendance) city, state
Non-conference regular season
11/13/2015*; 7:30 pm		at Seattle	W 58–56	1–0	Key Arena (3,450); Seattle, WA
11/16/2015*; 7:00 pm, FSOK+		at Oklahoma State	L 72–86	1–1	Gallagher-Iba Arena (4,556); Stillwater, OK
11/20/2015*; 7:00 pm, ESPN3		at No. 13 Michigan State	L 46–92	1-2	Breslin Student Events Center (14,797); East Lansing, MI
11/22/2015*; 1:00 pm, FSOH		at Cincinnati; Barclays Center Classic	L 50–99	1–3	Fifth Third Arena (6,083); Cincinnati, OH
11/24/2015*; 7:00 pm		at Nebraska; Barclays Center Classic	L 44–67	1–4	Pinnacle Bank Arena (15,502); Lincoln, NE
11/27/2015*; 7:30 pm		at Army; Barclays Center Classic	L 71–84	1–5	Christl Arena (885); West Point, NY
11/28/2015*; 4:00 pm		vs. Southeastern Louisiana; Barclays Center Classic	W 62–60	2–5	Christl Arena (588); West Point, NY
12/02/2015*; 7:00 pm		at Hawaii	L 47–75	2–6	Stan Sheriff Center (5,182); Honolulu, HI
12/05/2015*; 3:00 pm, ESPN3		at Virginia Tech	L 45–80	2–7	Cassell Coliseum (4,931); Blacksburg, VA
12/13/2015*; 5:00 pm		at No. 4 Iowa State	L 64–78	2–8	Hilton Coliseum (14,284); Ames, IA
12/15/2015*; 7:00 pm		at Santa Clara	L 57–69	2–9	Leavey Center (1,241); Santa Clara, CA
12/19/2014*; 4:00 pm, FSSW+		at Texas Tech	L 54–94	2–10	United Supermarkets Arena (6,612); Lubbock, TX
12/21/2015*; 7:00 pm		at Ohio	L 58–65	2–11	Convocation Center (5,254); Athens, OH
12/29/2015*; 8:00 pm		at Missouri	L 25–78	2–12	Mizzou Arena (6,154); Columbia, MO
SWAC regular season
01/04/2016; 7:30 pm		at Mississippi Valley State	L 60–66	2–13 (0–1)	Leflore County Civic Center (1,468); Greenwood, MS
01/08/2016; 7:30 pm		at Alabama A&M	L 70–85	2–14 (0–2)	Elmore Gymnasium; Huntsville, AL
01/11/2016; 7:30 pm		at Alabama State	W 59–55	3–14 (1–2)	Dunn–Oliver Acadome; Montgomery, AL
01/16/2016; 7:30 pm		Southern	L 55–69	3–15 (1–3)	K. L. Johnson Complex (2,785); Pine Bluff, AR
01/18/2016; 7:30 pm		Alcorn State	L 65–73	3–16 (1–4)	K. L. Johnson Complex (2,689); Pine Bluff, AR
01/23/2016; 7:30 pm		at Prairie View A&M	W 45–44	4–16 (2–4)	William J. Nicks Building (718); Prairie View, TX
01/25/2016; 7:30 pm		at Texas Southern	L 49–78	4–17 (2–5)	H&PE Arena (1,271); Houston, TX
01/30/2016; 7:30 pm		Grambling State	W 63–59	5–17 (3–5)	K. L. Johnson Complex (2,819); Pine Bluff, AR
02/01/2016; 7:30 pm		Jackson State	L 53–66	5–18 (3–6)	K. L. Johnson Complex (2,245); Pine Bluff, AR
02/06/2016; 7:30 pm		Alabama A&M	L 66–71	5–19 (3–7)	K. L. Johnson Complex (1,402); Pine Bluff, AR
02/08/2016; 7:30 pm		Alabama State	W 75–70 ^{OT}	6–19 (4–7)	K. L. Johnson Complex (981); Pine Bluff, AR
02/13/2016; 7:30 pm		at Southern	L 58–66	6–20 (4–8)	F. G. Clark Center (623); Baton Rouge, LA
02/15/2016; 7:30 pm		at Alcorn State	L 60–79	6–21 (4–9)	Davey Whitney Complex (1,213); Lorman, MS
02/20/2016; 7:30 pm		Prairie View A&M	L 55–57	6–22 (4–10)	K. L. Johnson Complex (798); Pine Bluff, AR
02/22/2016; 7:30 pm		Texas Southern	L 52–54	6–23 (4–11)	K. L. Johnson Complex (889); Pine Bluff, AR
02/27/2016; 7:30 pm		at Texas Southern	W 53–51	7–23 (5–11)	Fredrick C. Hobdy Assembly Center (759); Grambling, LA
02/29/2016; 7:30 pm		at Jackson State	L 56–67	7–24 (5–12)	Williams Assembly Center (701); Jackson, MS
03/05/2016; 7:30 pm		Mississippi Valley State	W 78–71	8–24 (6–12)	K. L. Johnson Complex (1,999); Pine Bluff, AR
SWAC tournament
03/08/2016; 8:30 pm	(9)	vs. (8) Alabama A&M; First Round	L 53–61	8–25	Toyota Center; Houston, TX
*Non-conference game. ^{#}Rankings from AP Poll. (#) Tournament seedings in parentheses. All times are in Central Time.
