= 2015–16 Baylor Bears basketball team =

American college basketball season

2015–16 Baylor Bears basketball

NCAA tournament, First Round
- Conference: Big 12 Conference

Ranking
- Coaches: No. 24
- AP: No. 21
- Record: 22–12 (10–8 Big 12)
- Head coach: Scott Drew (13th season)
- Assistant coaches: Jerome Tang; Grant McCasland; Paul Mills
- Home arena: Ferrell Center

2015–16 Big 12 men's basketball standings
	Conf.				Overall
Team	W		L	PCT	W		L	PCT
No. 1 Kansas †	15	–	3	.833	33	–	5	.868
No. 8 West Virginia	13	–	5	.722	26	–	9	.743
No. 7 Oklahoma	12	–	6	.667	29	–	8	.784
Texas	11	–	7	.611	20	–	13	.606
No. 21 Baylor	10	–	8	.556	22	–	12	.647
No. 22 Iowa State	10	–	8	.556	23	–	12	.657
Texas Tech	9	–	9	.500	19	–	13	.594
Kansas State	5	–	13	.278	17	–	16	.515
Oklahoma State	3	–	15	.167	12	–	20	.375
TCU	2	–	16	.111	12	–	21	.364
† 2016 Big 12 Tournament winner Rankings from AP poll

The 2015–16 Baylor Bears basketball team represented Baylor University in the 2015–16 NCAA Division I men's basketball season. This was head coach Scott Drew's thirteenth season at Baylor. The Bears competed in the Big 12 Conference and played their home games at the Ferrell Center. They finished the season 22–12, 10–8 in Big 12 play to finish in a tie for fifth place. They defeated Texas in the quarterfinal of the Big 12 tournament to advance to the semifinals where they lost to Kansas. They received an at-large bid to the NCAA tournament where they lost in the first round to Yale.

== Previous season ==
The Bears finished the season 24–10, 11–7 in Big 12 play to finish in a tie for fourth place. They advanced to the semifinals of the Big 12 tournament where they lost to Kansas. They received an at-large bid to the NCAA tournament where they were upset in the second round by Georgia State.

== Departures ==
Name	Number	Pos.	Height	Weight	Year	Hometown	Notes
Royce O'Neale	00	F	6'6"	215	Senior	Killeen, TX	Graduated
Kenny Chery	1	G	5'11"	180	Senior	Montreal, QC	Graduated
Damiyne Durham	23	G	6'4"	175	Freshman	Oakwood, TX	Walk-on; transferred to Cal State Bakersfield
Deng Deng	45	F	6'8"	205	Junior	Melbourne, Australia	Transferred

=== Incoming transfers ===
Name	Number	Pos.	Height	Weight	Year	Hometown	Notes
Joseph Acuil	0	C	7'0"	219	Junior	Melbourne, Australia	Junior college transferred from Neosho County CC
Manu Lecomte	20	G	5'9"	159	Junior	Brussels, Belgium	Transferred from Miami (FL). Under NCAA transfer rules, Lecomte will have to sit out for the 2015–16 season. Will have two years of remaining eligibility.

== Recruits ==
College recruiting information
Name	Hometown	School	Height	Weight	Commit date
King McClure; SG	Ovilla, TX	Triple A Academy	6 ft 3 in (1.91 m)	200 lb (91 kg)	Apr 29, 2014
King McClure; SG	Recruit ratings: Scout: Rivals: 247Sports: ESPN:				
Wendell Mitchell; SG	Rockdale, TX	Rockdale High School	6 ft 3 in (1.91 m)	175 lb (79 kg)	Oct 23, 2014
Wendell Mitchell; SG	Recruit ratings: Scout: Rivals: 247Sports: ESPN:				
Jake Lindsey; PG	Sandy, UT	Olympus High School	6 ft 5 in (1.96 m)	190 lb (86 kg)	Aug 25, 2014
Jake Lindsey; PG	Recruit ratings: Scout: Rivals: 247Sports: ESPN:				
Overall recruit ranking:
Note: In many cases, Scout, Rivals, 247Sports, On3, and ESPN may conflict in their listings of height and weight.; In these cases, the average was taken. ESPN grades are on a 100-point scale.; Sources: "2015 Team Ranking". Rivals.

=== Recruiting class of 2016 ===
College recruiting information (2016)
Name	Hometown	School	Height	Weight	Commit date
Mark Vital; PF	Lake Charles, LA	Prime Prep Academy	6 ft 6 in (1.98 m)	200 lb (91 kg)	Sep 3, 2013
Mark Vital; PF	Recruit ratings: Scout: Rivals: 247Sports: ESPN:				
Overall recruit ranking:
Note: In many cases, Scout, Rivals, 247Sports, On3, and ESPN may conflict in their listings of height and weight.; In these cases, the average was taken. ESPN grades are on a 100-point scale.; Sources: "2016 Team Ranking". Rivals.

== Roster ==
2015–16 Baylor Bears men's basketball team
Players
Coaches

Pos.	#	Name	Height	Weight	Year	Previous school	Hometown
F	0	Jo Acuil	7 ft 0 in (2.13 m)	210 lb (95 kg)	Jr	Kingsway Christian College; Neosho County CC	Melbourne, Australia
G	1	Wendell Mitchell	6 ft 3 in (1.91 m)	180 lb (82 kg)	Fr	Rockdale	Rockdale, TX
F	2	Rico Gathers	6 ft 8 in (2.03 m)	275 lb (125 kg)	Sr	Riverside Academy	LaPlace, LA
G	3	Jake Lindsey	6 ft 5 in (1.96 m)	190 lb (86 kg)	Fr	Olympus	Salt Lake City, UT
F	5	Johnathan Motley	6 ft 9 in (2.06 m)	230 lb (104 kg)	RS So	North Shore	Houston, TX
G	11	Lester Medford	5 ft 10 in (1.78 m)	175 lb (79 kg)	Sr	Amphitheater; Indian Hills CC	Tucson, AZ
F	13	John Heard	6 ft 5 in (1.96 m)	200 lb (91 kg)	Sr	Episcopal	Houston, TX
G	20	Manu Lecomte (I)	5 ft 9 in (1.75 m)	159 lb (72 kg)	Jr	Athene des Pagodes; Miami (FL)	Brussels, Belgium
F	21	Taurean Prince	6 ft 7 in (2.01 m)	220 lb (100 kg)	Sr	Earl Warren	San Antonio, TX
G	22	King McClure	6 ft 3 in (1.91 m)	200 lb (91 kg)	Fr	Triple A Academy	Ovilla, TX
G/F	24	Ish Wainright	6 ft 5 in (1.96 m)	240 lb (109 kg)	Jr	Montrose Christian	Kansas City, MO
F	25	Al Freeman	6 ft 3 in (1.91 m)	200 lb (91 kg)	RS So	Findlay Prep	Charlotte, NC
F	31	Terry Maston	6 ft 7 in (2.01 m)	215 lb (98 kg)	So	DeSoto	DeSoto, TX
G	33	Austin Mills	6 ft 1 in (1.85 m)	175 lb (79 kg)	Sr	Beverly Hills; Pepperdine	Beverly Hills, CA

Head coach

- Scott Drew (Butler)

Assistant coach(es)

- Jerome Tang (Charter Oak State)
- Grant McCasland (Baylor)
- Paul Mills (Texas A&M)

Legend

- (C) Team captain
- (S) Suspended
- (I) Ineligible
- (W) Walk-on
- Injured
- Current redshirt

== Schedule and results ==
Date time, TV	Rank^{#}	Opponent^{#}	Result	Record	Site (attendance) city, state
Regular season
November 13, 2015*; 8:30 pm, FSSW+	No. 22	Stephen F. Austin	W 97–55	1–0	Ferrell Center (7,041); Waco, TX
November 16, 2015*; 10:30 pm, ESPN2	No. 20	at No. 25 Oregon; College Hoops Tip-Off Marathon/ Global Sports Shootout	L 67–74	1–1	Matthew Knight Arena (7,718); Eugene, OR
November 20, 2015*; 7:00 pm, FSSW+	No. 20	Jackson State; Global Sports Shootout	W 77–60	2–1	Ferrell Center (5,973); Waco, TX
November 23, 2015*; 7:00 pm, FSSW		Savannah State; Global Sports Shootout	W 100–61	3–1	Ferrell Center (4,714); Waco, TX
November 27, 2015*; Noon, FSSW		Arkansas State; Global Sports Shootout	W 94–72	4–1	Ferrell Center (4,768); Waco, TX
December 2, 2015*; 8:30 pm, FSSW+	No. 25	Prairie View A&M	W 80–41	5–1	Ferrell Center (4,572); Waco, TX
December 6, 2015*; 7:00 pm, ESPNU	No. 25	No. 16 Vanderbilt	W 69–67	6–1	Ferrell Center (7,084); Waco, TX
December 8, 2015*; 7:00 pm, FSSW+	No. 16	Northwestern State	W 75–62	7–1	Ferrell Center (4,627); Waco, TX
December 16, 2015*; 7:00 pm, FSSW+	No. 16	vs. Hardin–Simmons	W 104–59	8–1	Abrams Gym (2,000); Fort Hood, TX
December 19, 2015*; 8:00 pm, ESPNU	No. 16	at No. 24 Texas A&M	L 61–80	8–2	Reed Arena (9,056); College Station, TX
December 23, 2015*; 7:00 pm, FSSW+	No. 23	New Mexico State	W 85–70	9–2	Ferrell Center (5,842); Waco, TX
December 29, 2015*; 4:00 pm, ESPNU	No. 23	Texas Southern	W 72–59	10–2	Ferrell Center (5,223); Waco, TX
January 2, 2016; 3:00 pm, CBS	No. 23	at No. 2 Kansas	L 74–102	10–3 (0–1)	Allen Fieldhouse (16,300); Lawrence, KS
January 5, 2016; 7:00 pm, ESPN2		Oklahoma State	W 79–62	11–3 (1–1)	Ferrell Center (5,665); Waco, TX
January 9, 2016; 2:00 pm, ESPN2		at No. 13 Iowa State	W 94–89	12–3 (2–1)	Hilton Coliseum (14,384); Ames, IA
January 13, 2016; 7:15 pm, ESPNews	No. 22	TCU	W 82–54	13–3 (3–1)	Ferrell Center (5,764); Waco, TX
January 16, 2016; 2:00 pm, FSSW	No. 22	at Texas Tech	W 63–60	14–3 (4–1)	United Supermarkets Arena (12,827); Lubbock, TX
January 20, 2016; 7:15 pm, ESPNews	No. 13	Kansas State	W 79–72 ^{2OT}	15–3 (5–1)	Ferrell Center (5,588); Waco, TX
January 23, 2016; 11:00 am, ESPN	No. 13	No. 1 Oklahoma	L 72–82	15–4 (5–2)	Ferrell Center (10,206); Waco, TX
January 27, 2016; 8:00 pm, ESPNU	No. 17	at Oklahoma State	W 69–65	16–4 (6–2)	Gallagher-Iba Arena (7,148); Stillwater, OK
January 30, 2016*; 5:00 pm, ESPN2	No. 17	Georgia; Big 12/SEC Challenge	W 83–73	17–4	Ferrell Center (9,675); Waco, TX
February 1, 2016; 8:00 pm, ESPN	No. 15	Texas	L 59–67	17–5 (6–3)	Ferrell Center (6,064); Waco, TX
February 6, 2016; 7:00 pm, ESPN2	No. 15	at No. 14 West Virginia	L 69–80	17–6 (6–4)	WVU Coliseum (14,069); Morgantown, WV
February 10, 2016; 7:15 pm, ESPNews	No. 21	at Kansas State	W 82–72	18–6 (7–4)	Bramlage Coliseum (11,636); Manhattan, KS
February 13, 2016; 7:00 pm, ESPNU	No. 21	Texas Tech	L 66–84	18–7 (7–5)	Ferrell Center (7,540); Waco, TX
February 16, 2016; 8:00 pm, ESPN2	No. 25	No. 13 Iowa State	W 100–91 ^{OT}	19–7 (8–5)	Ferrell Center (5,556); Waco, TX
February 20, 2016; 1:00 pm, ESPN	No. 25	at No. 24 Texas	W 78–64	20–7 (9–5)	Frank Erwin Center (16,540); Austin, TX
February 23, 2016; 7:00 pm, ESPN2	No. 19	No. 2 Kansas	L 60–66	20–8 (9–6)	Ferrell Center (8,259); Waco, TX
February 27, 2016; 7:00 pm, ESPNU	No. 19	at TCU	W 86–71	21–8 (10–6)	Schollmaier Arena (6,364); Fort Worth, TX
March 1, 2016; 7:00 pm, ESPN2	No. 19	at No. 6 Oklahoma	L 71–73	21–9 (10–7)	Lloyd Noble Center (11,563); Norman, OK
March 5, 2016; 1:00 pm, ESPN	No. 19	No. 10 West Virginia	L 58–69	21–10 (10–8)	Ferrell Center (7,629); Waco, TX
Big 12 tournament
March 10, 2016; 11:30 am, ESPN2	(5) No. 22	vs. (4) No. 23 Texas; Quarterfinals	W 75–61	22–10	Sprint Center (18,972); Kansas City, MO
March 11, 2016; 6:00 pm, ESPN2	(5) No. 22	vs. (1) No. 1 Kansas; Semifinals	L 66–70	22–11	Sprint Center (18,972); Kansas City, MO
NCAA tournament
March 17, 2016*; 1:45 PM, CBS	(5 W) No. 21	vs. (12 W) Yale; First Round	L 75–79	22–12	Dunkin' Donuts Center (11,656); Providence, RI
*Non-conference game. ^{#}Rankings from AP Poll. (#) Tournament seedings in parentheses. W=West. All times are in Central Time.

== Rankings ==
Ranking movement Legend: ██ Increase in ranking. ██ Decrease in ranking. ██ Not ranked the previous week.
Poll	Pre	Wk 2	Wk 3	Wk 4	Wk 5	Wk 6	Wk 7	Wk 8	Wk 9	Wk 10	Wk 11	Wk 12	Wk 13	Wk 14	Wk 15	Wk 16	Wk 17	Wk 18	Post	Final
AP	22	20	RV	25	16	16	23	23	RV	22	13	17	15	21	25	19	19	22	21	*N/A
Coaches	21	21	RV	23	15	14	22	21	25	22	15	18	13	19	22	16	17	20	18	24

*AP does not release post-NCAA tournament rankings
