= 2016 SWAC men's basketball tournament =

- Classification: Division I
- Season: 2015–16
- Teams: 10
- Site: Toyota Center; Houston, Texas
- Champions: Southern (9th title)
- Winning coach: Roman Banks (2nd title)
- MVP: Trelun Banks (Southern)
- Television: SWAC Digital Network, ESPNU

2015–16 SWAC men's basketball standings
	Conf.				Overall
Team	W		L	PCT	W		L	PCT
Texas Southern	16	–	2	.889	18	–	15	.545
Alcorn State*	13	–	5	.722	15	–	15	.500
Jackson State	12	–	6	.667	20	–	16	.556
Southern †	11	–	7	.611	22	–	13	.629
Alabama State	9	–	9	.500	14	–	17	.452
Prairie View A&M	7	–	11	.389	7	–	24	.226
Alabama A&M	6	–	12	.333	11	–	18	.379
Arkansas–Pine Bluff	6	–	12	.333	8	–	25	.242
Mississippi Valley State	6	–	12	.333	8	–	27	.229
Grambling State	4	–	14	.222	7	–	24	.226
† 2016 SWAC tournament winner *ineligible for postseason due to APR violations

The 2016 SWAC men's basketball tournament is the postseason men's basketball tournament for the Southwestern Athletic Conference. The tournament was held from March 8–12, 2016 at the Toyota Center in Houston, Texas The champion received the conference's automatic bid to the 2016 NCAA tournament.

== Seeds ==
All 10 SWAC teams participated in the Tournament. Alcorn State was ineligible for NCAA postseason play due to APR violations. Had Alcorn State won the tournament, the SWAC's bid would have been awarded to the highest remaining seed still in the field. The top 6 teams received a bye into the Quarterfinals.

Teams were seeded by record within the conference, with a tiebreaker system to seed teams with identical conference records.

Seed	School	Conference	Tiebreaker
1	Texas Southern	16–2	
2	Alcorn State	13–5	
3	Jackson State	12–6	
4	Southern	11–7	
5	Alabama State	9–9	
6	Prairie View A&M	7–11	
7	Mississippi Valley State	6–12	3–1 vs Alabama A&M & Arkansas-Pine Bluff
8	Alabama A&M	6–12	2–2 vs Mississippi Valley State & Arkansas-Pine Bluff
9	Arkansas-Pine Bluff	6–12	1–3 vs Mississippi Valley State & Alabama A&M
10	Grambling State	4–14	

== Schedule ==
Session	Game	Time*	Matchup^{#}	Score	Television
First round – Tuesday, March 8
1	1	2:30 pm	#7 Mississippi Valley St. vs. #10 Grambling State	87–73	SWAC Digital Network
1	2	8:30 pm	#8 Alabama A&M vs. #9 Arkansas-Pine Bluff	61–53	SWAC Digital Network
Quarterfinals – Wednesday, March 9
2	3	2:30 pm	#2 Alcorn State vs. #7 Mississippi Valley St.	61–64	SWAC Digital Network
2	4	8:30 pm	#1 Texas Southern vs. #8 Alabama A&M	77–69	SWAC Digital Network
Quarterfinals – Thursday, March 10
3	5	2:30 pm	#3 Jackson State vs #6 Prairie View A&M	69–51	SWAC Digital Network
3	6	8:30 pm	#4 Southern vs. #5 Alabama State	83–63	SWAC Digital Network
Semifinals – Friday, March 11
4	7	2:30 pm	#3 Jackson State vs. #7 Mississippi Valley St.	74–68	SWAC Digital Network
4	8	8:30 pm	#1 Texas Southern vs. #4 Southern	73–81	SWAC Digital Network
Championship – Saturday, March 12
5	9	5:30 pm	#3 Jackson State vs. #4 Southern	53–54	ESPNU

*Game times in Central Time. #Rankings denote tournament seeding.

== Bracket ==
First round Tuesday March 8
8	Alabama A&M	61
9	Arkansas–Pine Bluff	53
7	Mississippi Valley State	87
10	Grambling State	73

Quarterfinals; Wednesday, March 9 Thursday, March 10
1	Texas Southern	77
8	Alabama A&M	69
4	Southern	83
5	Alabama State	63
2	Alcorn State	61
7	Mississippi Valley State	64
3	Jackson State	69
6	Prairie View A&M	51

Semifinals; Friday, March 11
1	Texas Southern	73
4	Southern	81
7	Mississippi Valley State	68
3	Jackson State	74

Championship; Saturday, March 12; ESPNU
4	Southern	54
3	Jackson State	53
