= 2015–16 Texas Southern Tigers basketball team =

American college basketball season

2015–16 Texas Southern Tigers basketball
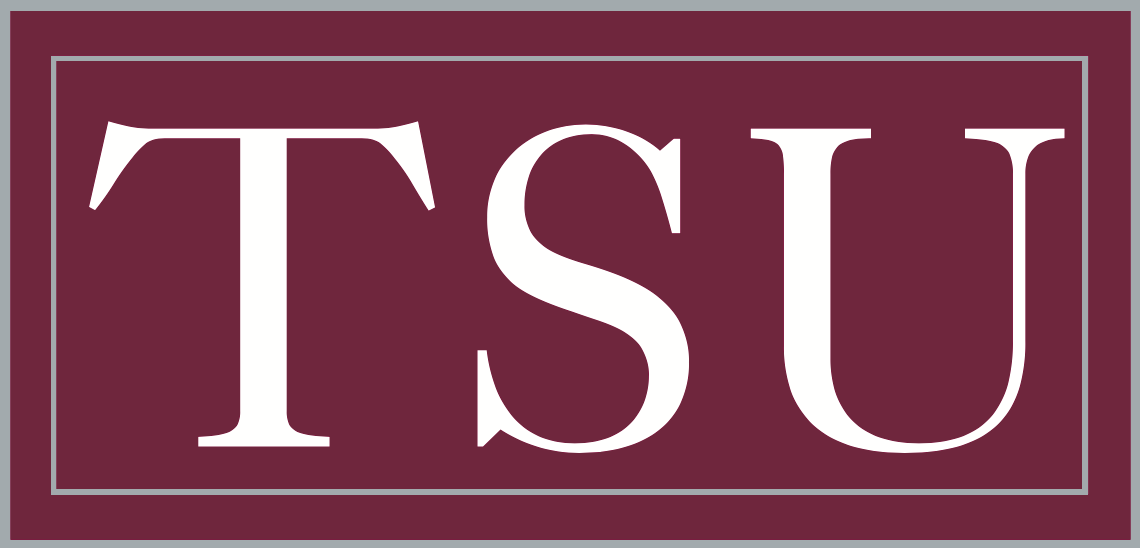

SWAC regular season champions

NIT, First round
- Conference: Southwestern Athletic Conference
- Record: 18–15 (16–2 SWAC)
- Head coach: Mike Davis (4th season)
- Associate head coach: Donnie Marsh
- Assistant coaches: Michael Davis, Jr.; J. Keith LeGree
- Home arena: Health and Physical Education Arena

2015–16 SWAC men's basketball standings
	Conf.				Overall
Team	W		L	PCT	W		L	PCT
Texas Southern	16	–	2	.889	18	–	15	.545
Alcorn State*	13	–	5	.722	15	–	15	.500
Jackson State	12	–	6	.667	20	–	16	.556
Southern †	11	–	7	.611	22	–	13	.629
Alabama State	9	–	9	.500	14	–	17	.452
Prairie View A&M	7	–	11	.389	7	–	24	.226
Alabama A&M	6	–	12	.333	11	–	18	.379
Arkansas–Pine Bluff	6	–	12	.333	8	–	25	.242
Mississippi Valley State	6	–	12	.333	8	–	27	.229
Grambling State	4	–	14	.222	7	–	24	.226
† 2016 SWAC tournament winner *ineligible for postseason due to APR violations

The 2015–16 Texas Southern Tigers basketball team represented Texas Southern University during the 2015–16 NCAA Division I men's basketball season. The Tigers, led by fourth year head coach Mike Davis, played pik home games at the Health and Physical Education Arena and were members of the Southwestern Athletic Conference. They finished the season 18–15, 16–2 in SWAC play to win the regular season SWAC championship. They defeated Alabama A&M in the quarterfinals of the SWAC tournament to advance to the semifinals where they lost to Southern. As regular season conference champions who failed to win their conference tournament, they received an automatic bid to the National Invitation Tournament where they lost to Valparaiso in the first round.

== Previous season ==
The Tigers finished the 2014–15 season with a record of 22–13, 16–2 in conference and winners of the SWAC regular season and Tournament. By winning the tournament, they received the conference's automatic bid to the NCAA tournament where they lost in the second round to Arizona.

== Roster ==
2015–16 Texas Southern Tigers men's basketball team
Players
Coaches

Pos.	#	Name	Height	Weight	Year	Hometown
G	0	Bryan Carey	5 ft 9 in (1.75 m)	160 lb (73 kg)	Fr	Denver, CO
G	2	Chris Thomas	6 ft 5 in (1.96 m)	190 lb (86 kg)	Sr	Denver, CO
G	3	David Blanks	3 ft 3 in (0.99 m)	180 lb (82 kg)	Sr	Barberton, OH
F	4	Jose Rodriquez	6 ft 7 in (2.01 m)	215 lb (98 kg)	Sr	The Bronx, NY
G	5	Tyree Bynum	5 ft 9 in (1.75 m)	165 lb (75 kg)	Jr	Philadelphia, PA
F	11	Malcolm Riley	6 ft 5 in (1.96 m)	200 lb (91 kg)	Sr	Newport News, VA
F	14	Eric Washington	6 ft 4 in (1.93 m)	210 lb (95 kg)	Jr	Birmingham, AL
G	20	Jerron Martin	6 ft 0 in (1.83 m)	175 lb (79 kg)	Jr	Baltimore, MD
F	23	Derrick Griffin	6 ft 7 in (2.01 m)	225 lb (102 kg)	RS Fr	Houston, TX
F	24	Orlando Coleman	6 ft 5 in (1.96 m)	210 lb (95 kg)	Sr	Birmingham, AL
F	25	Joshua Friar	6 ft 8 in (2.03 m)	260 lb (118 kg)	So	Houston, TX
F	32	Dwayne Washington	6 ft 9 in (2.06 m)	275 lb (125 kg)	Sr	Houston, TX
C	33	Jermain Davis II	6 ft 9 in (2.06 m)	275 lb (125 kg)	Sr	Cleveland, OH
F	44	Billy Rosenburg	6 ft 5 in (1.96 m)	255 lb (116 kg)	Sr	Memphis, TN

Head coach

- Mike Davis (Alabama)

Assistant coach(es)

- Michael Davis, Jr.
- J. Keith LeGree

Legend

- (C) Team captain
- (S) Suspended
- (I) Ineligible
- (W) Walk-on
- Injured
- Current redshirt

== Schedule ==
Date time, TV	Rank^{#}	Opponent^{#}	Result	Record	Site (attendance) city, state
Regular season
11/13/2015*; 5:30 pm, RTRM		at New Mexico	L 57–86	0–1	The Pit (12,269); Albuquerque, NM
11/14/2015*; 5:00 pm, FS2		at Creighton; Men Who Speak Up Main Event	L 70–93	0–2	CenturyLink Center Omaha (16,538); Omaha, NE
11/19/2015*; 7:00 pm, ESPN3		at Clemson; Men Who Speak Up Main Event	L 56–76	0–3	Bon Secours Wellness Arena (6,185); Greenville, SC
11/23/2015*; 3:00 pm		vs. Howard; Men Who Speak Up Main Event	L 81–87	0–4	MGM Grand Arena (323); Paradise, NV
11/25/2015*; 12:30 pm		at UTSA; Men Who Speak Up Main Event	W 91–80	1–4	MGM Grand Arena (217); Paradise, NV
11/28/2015*; 6:00 pm, P12N		at Washington State	L 65–77	1–5	Beasley Coliseum (1,604); Pullman, WA
12/02/2015*; 7:00 pm, SECN		at Mississippi State	L 73–86	1–6	Humphrey Coliseum (6,239); Starkville, MS
12/05/2015*; 4:00 pm		at Stephen F. Austin	L 62–66	1–7	William R. Johnson Coliseum (2,392); Nacogdoches, TX
12/12/2015*; 3:30 pm, ESPN3		at Central Michigan	L 71–79	1–8	McGuirk Arena (2,492); Mount Pleasant, MI
12/16/2015*; 6:00 pm		at Iona	L 73–83	1–9	Hynes Athletic Center (1,326); New Rochelle, NY
12/27/2015*; 1:00 pm, ESPNU		at Syracuse	L 67–80	1–10	Carrier Dome (21,601); Syracuse, NY
12/29/2015*; 7:00 pm, ESPNU		at No. 23 Baylor	L 59–72	1–11	Ferrell Center (5,223); Waco, TX
12/31/2015*; 2:00 pm		vs. Hampton			Birmingham, AL
01/02/2016; 7:30 pm		Southern	W 88–66	2–11 (1–0)	H&PE Arena (2,467); Houston, TX
01/04/2016; 7:00 pm		Alcorn State	W 74–58	3–11 (2–0)	H&PE Arena (1,245); Houston, TX
01/09/2016; 7:30 pm		Prairie View A&M	W 64–38	4–11 (3–0)	H&PE Arena (5,287); Houston, TX
01/16/2016; 5:30 pm		at Jackson State	W 71–65	5–11 (4–0)	Williams Assembly Center (1,591); Jackson, MS
01/18/2016; 7:30 pm		at Grambling State	W 69–54	6–11 (5–0)	Fredrick C. Hobdy Assembly Center (537); Grambling, LA
01/23/2016; 7:30 pm		Mississippi Valley State	W 75–60	7–11 (6–0)	H&PE Arena (2,468); Houston, TX
01/25/2016; 7:30 pm		Arkansas–Pine Bluff	W 78–49	8–11 (7–0)	H&PE Arena (1,271); Houston, TX
01/30/2016; 5:00 pm		at Alabama State	W 75–72	9–11 (8–0)	Dunn–Oliver Acadome (1,846); Montgomery, AL
02/01/2016; 7:30 pm		at Alabama A&M	W 71–66	10–11 (9–0)	Elmore Gymnasium; Huntsville, AL
02/06/2016; 7:30 pm		at Prairie View A&M	L 55–59	10–12 (9–1)	William J. Nicks Building (3,527); Prairie View, TX
02/13/2016; 7:30 pm		Jackson State	W 76–60	11–12 (10–1)	H&PE Arena (2,642); Houston, TX
02/15/2016; 7:30 pm		Grambling State	W 79–72	12–12 (11–1)	H&PE Arena (1,426); Houston, TX
02/20/2016; 4:00 pm		at Mississippi Valley State	W 98–67	13–12 (12–1)	Harris Arena (898); Moorhead, MS
02/22/2016; 7:30 pm		at Arkansas–Pine Bluff	W 54–52	14–12 (13–1)	K. L. Johnson Complex (889); Pine Bluff, AR
02/27/2016; 7:30 pm		Alabama A&M	W 77–54	15–12 (14–1)	H&PE Arena (2,342); Houston, TX
02/29/2016; 8:00 pm		Alabama State	W 98–86	16–12 (15–1)	H&PE Arena; Houston, TX
03/03/2016; 7:30 pm		at Southern	L 79–84	16–13 (15–2)	F. G. Clark Center (2,795); Baton Rouge, LA
03/05/2016; 4:00 pm		at Alcorn State	W 76–66	17–13 (16–2)	Davey Whitney Complex (1,921); Lorman, MS
SWAC tournament
03/09/2016; 8:30 pm	(1)	vs. (8) Alabama A&M; Quarterfinals	W 77–69	18–13	Toyota Center; Houston, TX
03/11/2016; 8:30 pm	(1)	vs. (4) Southern; Semifinals	L 73–81	18–14	Toyota Center (2,008); Houston, TX
NIT
3/15/16*; 8:15 pm, ESPN3	(8)	at (1) Valparaiso; First round – Valparaiso Bracket	L 73–84	18–15	Athletics–Recreation Center (2,912); Valparaiso, IN
*Non-conference game. ^{#}Rankings from AP Poll. (#) Tournament seedings in parentheses. All times are in Central Time; Source.
