= 2015–16 West Virginia Mountaineers men's basketball team =

American college basketball season

2015–16 West Virginia Mountaineers men's basketball

Las Vegas Invitational Champions

NCAA tournament, First Round
- Conference: Big 12 Conference

Ranking
- Coaches: No. 14
- AP: No. 8
- Record: 26–9 (13–5 Big 12)
- Head coach: Bob Huggins (9th season)
- Assistant coaches: Larry Harrison; Ron Everhart; Erik Martin
- Home arena: WVU Coliseum

2015–16 Big 12 men's basketball standings
	Conf.				Overall
Team	W		L	PCT	W		L	PCT
No. 1 Kansas †	15	–	3	.833	33	–	5	.868
No. 8 West Virginia	13	–	5	.722	26	–	9	.743
No. 7 Oklahoma	12	–	6	.667	29	–	8	.784
Texas	11	–	7	.611	20	–	13	.606
No. 21 Baylor	10	–	8	.556	22	–	12	.647
No. 22 Iowa State	10	–	8	.556	23	–	12	.657
Texas Tech	9	–	9	.500	19	–	13	.594
Kansas State	5	–	13	.278	17	–	16	.515
Oklahoma State	3	–	15	.167	12	–	20	.375
TCU	2	–	16	.111	12	–	21	.364
† 2016 Big 12 Tournament winner Rankings from AP poll

The 2015–16 West Virginia Mountaineers men's basketball team represented West Virginia University during the 2015–16 NCAA Division I men's basketball season. The Mountaineers were coached by ninth year head coach Bob Huggins and played their home games at WVU Coliseum. They were members of the Big 12 Conference. They finished the season 26–9, 13–5 in Big 12 play to finish in second place. They defeated TCU and Oklahoma to advance to the championship game of the Big 12 tournament where they lost to Kansas. They received an at-large bid to the NCAA tournament where, as a #3 seed, they were upset in the first round by #14 seed Stephen F. Austin.

== Previous season ==
The Mountaineers finished the season 25–10, 11–7 in Big 12 play to finish in a tie for fourth place. They lost in the quarterfinals of the Big 12 tournament to Baylor. They received an at-large bid to the NCAA tournament where they defeated Buffalo in the second round and Maryland in the third round before losing in the Sweet Sixteen to Kentucky.

== Departures ==
Name	Number	Pos.	Height	Weight	Year	Hometown	Notes
Juwan Staten	3	G	6'1"	190	RS Senior	Dayton, OH	Graduated
Chase Connor	10	G	6'1"	190	Sophomore	Shady Spring, WV	Transferred to Fairmont State
Gary Browne	14	G	6'1"	195	Senior	Cupey, PR	Graduated
BillyDee Williams	21	F	6'6"	215	Junior	Orlando, FL	Transferred to UT Permian Basin
Tyron Hughes	23	G	6'0"	185	Junior	Chicago, IL	Walk-on; left the team
Kevin Noreen	34	F	6'10"	245	Senior	Minneapolis, MN	Graduated

=== Incoming transfers ===
Name	Number	Pos.	Height	Weight	Year	Hometown	Previous School
Teyvon Meyers	1	G	6'3"	180	Junior	Brooklyn, NY	Junior college transfer from Williston State College
TyQuane Goard		F	6'7"	215	RS Senior	Charleston, WV	Transferred from Marshall. Under NCAA transfer rules, Goard will have to sit out for the 2015–16 season. Will have one year of remaining eligibility.

== Recruits ==
College recruiting information
Name	Hometown	School	Height	Weight	Commit date
Esa Ahmad; SF	Shaker Heights, OH	Shaker Heights High School	6 ft 8 in (2.03 m)	218 lb (99 kg)	Sep 10, 2014
Esa Ahmad; SF	Recruit ratings: Scout: Rivals: 247Sports: ESPN:				
James Bolden; PG	Covington, KY	Holmes High School	5 ft 11 in (1.80 m)	160 lb (73 kg)	May 14, 2014
James Bolden; PG	Recruit ratings: Scout: Rivals: 247Sports: ESPN:				
Lamont West; PG	Lithonia, GA	Miller Grove High School	6 ft 7 in (2.01 m)	200 lb (91 kg)	May 14, 2015
Lamont West; PG	Recruit ratings: Scout: Rivals: 247Sports: ESPN:				
Overall recruit ranking: Scout: Not Ranked Rivals: 23 ESPN: 20
Note: In many cases, Scout, Rivals, 247Sports, On3, and ESPN may conflict in their listings of height and weight.; In these cases, the average was taken. ESPN grades are on a 100-point scale.; Sources: "West Virginia 2015 Basketball Commitments". Rivals.; "2015 West Virginia Basketball Commits". Scout.; "ESPN". ESPN.; "Scout.com Team Recruiting Rankings". Scout.; "2015 Team Ranking". Rivals.

=== Recruit Class of 2016 ===
College recruiting information (2016)
Name	Hometown	School	Height	Weight	Commit date
Chase Harler; SG	Wheeling, WV	Central Catholic High School	6 ft 3 in (1.91 m)	180 lb (82 kg)	Aug 3, 2014
Chase Harler; SG	Recruit ratings: Scout: Rivals: 247Sports: ESPN:				
Brandon Knapper; SG	Charleston, WV	South Charleston High School	6 ft 0 in (1.83 m)	160 lb (73 kg)	Sep 21, 2014
Brandon Knapper; SG	Recruit ratings: Scout: Rivals: 247Sports: ESPN:				
Overall recruit ranking: Scout: Not Ranked Rivals: 23 ESPN: 20
Note: In many cases, Scout, Rivals, 247Sports, On3, and ESPN may conflict in their listings of height and weight.; In these cases, the average was taken. ESPN grades are on a 100-point scale.; Sources: "West Virginia 2016 Basketball Commitments". Rivals.; "2016 West Virginia Basketball Commits". Scout.; "ESPN". ESPN.; "Scout.com Team Recruiting Rankings". Scout.; "2016 Team Ranking". Rivals.

== Roster ==
2015–16 West Virginia Mountaineers men's basketball team
Players
Coaches

Pos.	#	Name	Height	Weight	Year	Previous school	Hometown
G	0	Teyvon Myers	6 ft 2 in (1.88 m)	170 lb (77 kg)	Jr	Williston State College	Brooklyn, NY
F	1	Jonathan Holton	6 ft 7 in (2.01 m)	220 lb (100 kg)	RS Sr	Palm Beach State CC	Miami, FL
G	2	Jevon Carter	6 ft 2 in (1.88 m)	195 lb (88 kg)	So	Proviso East HS	Maywood, IL
G	3	James Bolden	6 ft 0 in (1.83 m)	160 lb (73 kg)	Fr	Holmes HS	Covington, KY
G	4	Daxter Miles Jr.	6 ft 3 in (1.91 m)	195 lb (88 kg)	So	Notre Dame Prep	Baltimore, MD
G	5	Jaysean Paige	6 ft 2 in (1.88 m)	210 lb (95 kg)	Sr	Moberly Area CC	Jamestown, NY
F	11	Nathan Adrian	6 ft 9 in (2.06 m)	240 lb (109 kg)	Jr	Morgantown	Morgantown, WV
G	12	Tarik Phillip	6 ft 3 in (1.91 m)	200 lb (91 kg)	Jr	Independence CC	Brooklyn, NY
G	13	James Long	5 ft 11 in (1.8 m)	190 lb (86 kg)	Jr	Wofford	Charleston, WV
F	15	Lamont West	6 ft 8 in (2.03 m)	215 lb (98 kg)	Fr	Miller Grove	Cincinnati, OH
F	20	Brandon Watkins	6 ft 9 in (2.06 m)	245 lb (111 kg)	Jr	Grady	Decatur, GA
F	21	Logan Routt	6 ft 11 in (2.11 m)	250 lb (113 kg)	Fr	Cameron	Cameron, WV
F	23	Esa Ahmad	6 ft 8 in (2.03 m)	225 lb (102 kg)	Fr	Shaker Heights	Shaker Heights, OH
G	30	Richard Romeo III	6 ft 0 in (1.83 m)	185 lb (84 kg)	Sr	Greenbrier East	White Sulphur Springs, WV
F	41	Devin Williams	6 ft 9 in (2.06 m)	255 lb (116 kg)	Jr	Montverde Academy	Cincinnati, OH
F	45	Elijah Macon	6 ft 9 in (2.06 m)	235 lb (107 kg)	RS So	Brewster Academy	Columbus, OH

Head coach

- Bob Huggins (West Virginia)

Assistant coach(es)

- Larry Harrison (Pittsburgh)
- Ron Everhart (Virginia Tech)
- Erik Martin (Cincinnati)

Legend

- (C) Team captain
- (S) Suspended
- (I) Ineligible
- (W) Walk-on
- Injured
- Current redshirt

Roster

== Schedule and results ==
Sources: and

Date time, TV	Rank^{#}	Opponent^{#}	Result	Record	Site (attendance) city, state
Exhibition
11/06/2015*; 7:00 pm		Glenville State	W 114–76		WVU Coliseum (6,115); Morgantown, WV
Regular season
11/13/2015*; 7:00 pm		Northern Kentucky	W 107–61	1–0	WVU Coliseum (10,120); Morgantown, WV
11/16/2015*; 7:00 pm, RTPT		vs. James Madison; Charleston Showcase	W 86–73	2–0	Charleston Civic Center (8,101); Charleston, WV
11/20/2015*; 7:00 pm, RTPT		Stetson; Las Vegas Invitational	W 103–62	3–0	WVU Coliseum (8,268); Morgantown, WV
11/23/2015*; 7:00 pm, RTPT		Bethune-Cookman; Las Vegas Invitational	W 97–44	4–0	WVU Coliseum (6,196); Morgantown, WV
11/26/2015*; 5:00 pm, FS1		vs. Richmond; Las Vegas Invitational semifinals	W 67–59	5–0	Orleans Arena; Paradise, NV
11/27/2015*; 10:30 pm, FS1		vs. San Diego State; Las Vegas Invitational championship	W 72–50	6–0	Orleans Arena (3,245); Paradise, NV
12/05/2015*; 12:30 pm, RTPT	No. 20	Kennesaw State	W 87–54	7–0	WVU Coliseum (8,731); Morgantown, WV
12/08/2015*; 7:00 pm, ESPN	No. 14	vs. No. 10 Virginia; Jimmy V Classic	L 54–70	7–1	Madison Square Garden; New York City, NY
12/13/2015*; 5:00 pm	No. 14	Louisiana–Monroe	W 100–58	8–1	WVU Coliseum (8,323); Morgantown, WV
12/17/2015*; 7:00 pm, ESPNU	No. 20	vs. Marshall; Chesapeake Energy Capital Classic	W 86–68	9–1	Charleston Civic Center (11,748); Charleston, WV
12/21/2015*; 7:00 pm, ESPNU	No. 19	Eastern Kentucky	W 84–59	10–1	WVU Coliseum (8,121); Morgantown, WV
12/30/2015*; 12:00 pm, ESPNU	No. 19	at Virginia Tech	W 88–63	11–1	Cassell Coliseum (9,567); Blacksburg, VA
01/02/2016; 12:00 pm, ESPNU	No. 19	at Kansas State	W 87–83 ^{2OT}	12–1 (1–0)	Bramlage Coliseum (12,270); Manhattan, KS
01/04/2016; 7:00 pm, ESPN2	No. 17	at TCU	W 95–87	13–1 (2–0)	Schollmaier Arena (4,239); Fort Worth, TX
01/09/2016; 1:00 pm, ESPNU	No. 17	Oklahoma State	W 77–60	14–1 (3–0)	WVU Coliseum (11,219); Morgantown, WV
01/12/2016; 7:00 pm, ESPN2	No. 11	No. 1 Kansas	W 74–63	15–1 (4–0)	WVU Coliseum (12,097); Morgantown, WV
01/16/2016; 4:00 pm, ESPN2	No. 11	at No. 2 Oklahoma	L 68–70	15–2 (4–1)	Lloyd Noble Center (11,933); Norman, OK
01/20/2016; 7:00 pm, ESPNU	No. 6	Texas	L 49–56	15–3 (4–2)	WVU Coliseum (9,881); Morgantown, WV
01/23/2016; 1:00 pm, ESPNews	No. 6	at Texas Tech	W 80–76	16–3 (5–2)	United Supermarkets Arena (10,732); Lubbock, TX
01/26/2016; 7:00 pm, ESPNews	No. 9	Kansas State	W 70–55	17–3 (6–2)	WVU Coliseum (9,936); Morgantown, WV
01/30/2016*; 12:00 pm, ESPN	No. 9	at Florida; Big 12/SEC Challenge	L 71–88	17–4	O'Connell Center (11,611); Gainesville, FL
02/02/2016; 9:00 pm, ESPN2	No. 14	at No. 13 Iowa State	W 81–76	18–4 (7–2)	Hilton Coliseum (14,384); Ames, IA
02/06/2016; 8:00 pm, ESPN2	No. 14	No. 15 Baylor	W 80–69	19–4 (8–2)	WVU Coliseum (14,069); Morgantown, WV
02/09/2016; 7:00 pm, ESPN2	No. 10	at No. 6 Kansas	L 65–75	19–5 (8–3)	Allen Fieldhouse (16,300); Lawrence, KS
02/13/2016; 12:00 pm, ESPNU	No. 10	TCU	W 73–42	20–5 (9–3)	WVU Coliseum (13,137); Morgantown, WV
02/16/2016; 7:00 pm, ESPN2	No. 10	at No. 24 Texas	L 78–85	20–6 (9–4)	Frank Erwin Center (12,284); Austin, TX
02/20/2016; 4:00 pm, ESPN	No. 10	No. 3 Oklahoma	L 62–76	20–7 (9–5)	WVU Coliseum (15,289); Morgantown, WV
02/22/2016; 9:00 pm, ESPN	No. 14	No. 17 Iowa State	W 97–87	21–7 (10–5)	WVU Coliseum (10,683); Morgantown, WV
02/27/2016; 6:00 pm, ESPNU	No. 14	at Oklahoma State	W 70–56	22–7 (11–5)	Gallagher-Iba Arena (5,539); Stillwater, OK
03/02/2016; 7:00 pm, ESPNU	No. 10	Texas Tech	W 90–68	23–7 (12–5)	WVU Coliseum (12,680); Morgantown, WV
03/05/2016; 2:00 pm, ESPN	No. 10	at No. 19 Baylor	W 69–58	24–7 (13–5)	Ferrell Center (7,629); Waco, TX
Big 12 tournament
03/10/2016; 7:00 pm, ESPNU	(2) No. 9	vs. (10) TCU; Quarterfinals	W 86–66	25–7	Sprint Center (18,972); Kansas City, MO
03/11/2016; 9:00 pm, ESPN2	(2) No. 9	vs. (3) No. 6 Oklahoma; Semifinals	W 69–67	26–7	Sprint Center (18,972); Kansas City, MO
03/12/2016; 6:00 pm, ESPN	(2) No. 9	vs. (1) No. 1 Kansas; Championship	L 71–81	26–8	Sprint Center (19,046); Kansas City, MO
NCAA tournament
03/18/2016*; 7:10 PM, CBS	(3 E) No. 8	vs. (14 E) Stephen F. Austin; First Round	L 56–70	26–9	Barclays Center (17,502); Brooklyn, NY
*Non-conference game. ^{#}Rankings from AP Poll. (#) Tournament seedings in parentheses. E=East Region. All times are in Eastern Time.

== Rankings ==
Ranking movement Legend: ██ Increase in ranking. ██ Decrease in ranking. ██ Not ranked the previous week.
Poll	Pre	Wk 2	Wk 3	Wk 4	Wk 5	Wk 6	Wk 7	Wk 8	Wk 9	Wk 10	Wk 11	Wk 12	Wk 13	Wk 14	Wk 15	Wk 16	Wk 17	Wk 18	Post	Final
AP	RV	RV	RV	20	14	20	19	19	17	11	6	9	14	10	10	14	10	9	8	*N/A
Coaches	23	22	22	15	14	16	18	17	15	10	7	9	12	10	11	12	9	8	8	14

*AP does not release post-NCAA tournament rankings

== See also ==
- 2015–16 West Virginia Mountaineers women's basketball team
