= 2015–16 NJIT Highlanders men's basketball team =

American college basketball season

2015–16 NJIT Highlanders men's basketball

CIT, Semifinals
- Conference: Atlantic Sun Conference
- Record: 20–15 (8–6 A-Sun)
- Head coach: Jim Engles (8th season)
- Assistant coach: Brian Kennedy; Jesse Agel; Kim Waiters
- Home arena: Fleisher Center (cap. 1600)

2015–16 Atlantic Sun men's basketball standings
	Conf.				Overall
Team	W		L	PCT	W		L	PCT
North Florida	10	–	4	.714	22	–	12	.647
NJIT	8	–	6	.571	20	–	15	.571
Jacksonville	8	–	6	.571	16	–	16	.500
Florida Gulf Coast †	8	–	6	.571	21	–	14	.600
Kennesaw State	7	–	7	.500	11	–	20	.355
Lipscomb	7	–	7	.500	12	–	21	.364
Stetson*	4	–	10	.286	12	–	22	.353
USC Upstate	4	–	10	.286	10	–	22	.313
† 2016 Atlantic Sun Tournament winner *ineligible for the 2016 NCAA tournament due to APR violations

The 2015–16 NJIT Highlanders men's basketball team represented the New Jersey Institute of Technology during the 2015–16 NCAA Division I men's basketball season. The Highlanders, led by eighth year head coach Jim Engles, played their home games at the Fleisher Center. After two seasons as the only Division I independent, they were first year members of the Atlantic Sun Conference. They finished the season 20–15, 8–6 in A-Sun play to finish in to finish in a three-way tie for second place. They lost in the quarterfinals of the A-Sun tournament to Stetson. They were invited to the CollegeInsider.com Tournament where they defeated Army, Boston University, and Texas–Arlington to advance to the semifinals where they lost to Columbia.

On April 1, head coach Jim Engles resigned to become the head coach at Columbia. He finished at NJIT with an eight-year record of 111–139.

== Roster ==
Number	Name	Position	Height	Weight	Year	Hometown
0	Ky Howard	Guard	6–4	185	Senior	Philadelphia, Pennsylvania
2	Tim Coleman	Forward	6–5	210	Junior	Union, New Jersey
3	Chris Jenkins	Guard/Forward	6–4	215	Sophomore	Hillside, New Jersey
5	Damon Lynn	Guard	5–11	165	Junior	Hillside, New Jersey
11	Winfield Willis	Guard	6–0	180	Senior	Baltimore, Maryland
12	Abdul Lewis	Forward	6–9	225	Sophomore	Irvington, New Jersey
14	Reilly Walsh	Guard	6–3	180	Freshman	Staten Island, New York
15	Terrence Smith	Forward	6–6	195	Junior	Fort Lauderdale, Florida
23	Osa Izevbuwa	Guard	6–3	230	Junior	Staten Island, New York
24	Emmanuel Tselentakis	Guard	6–5	205	Senior	Thessaloniki, Greece
25	Rob Ukawuba	Guard	6–3	210	Junior	East Brunswick, New Jersey
33	Vlad Shustov	Forward	6–10	225	Sophomore	Tomsk, Russia
34	Mohamed Bendary	Forward	6–9	235	Freshman	Jersey City, New Jersey

== Schedule ==
Date time, TV	Rank^{#}	Opponent^{#}	Result	Record	Site (attendance) city, state
Non-conference regular season
11/14/2015*; 7:00 pm, SECN		at No. 2 Kentucky; Hoophall Miami Invitational	L 57–87	0–1	Rupp Arena (22,671); Lexington, KY
11/16/2015*; 7:00 pm, ESPN3		at South Florida; Hoophall Miami Invitational	W 60–57	1–1	USF Sun Dome (2,672); Tampa, FL
11/19/2015*; 7:30 pm, ESPN3		Boston University; Hoophall Miami Invitational	W 90–76	2–1	Fleisher Center (1,488); Newark, NJ
11/21/2015*; 4:00 pm, ESPN3		Lafayette	W 80–66	3–1	Fleisher Center (1,000); Newark, NJ
11/23/2015*; 6:30 pm, FS1		at Providence	L 76–83	3–2	Dunkin' Donuts Center (5,009); Providence, RI
11/27/2015*; 7:00 pm		at Albany; Hoophall Miami Invitational	L 73–74	3–3	SEFCU Arena (3,253); Albany, NY
11/29/2015*; 2:00 pm		Maine–Fort Kent	W 89–60	4–3	Fleisher Center (400); Newark, NJ
12/05/2015*; 4:00 pm, ESPN3		UMass Lowell	W 90–77	5–3	Fleisher Center (1,011); Newark, NJ
12/07/2015*; 7:00 pm, ESPN3		Kent State	L 75-80	5–4	Fleisher Center (987); Newark, NJ
12/10/2015*; 7:00 pm		at St. Francis Brooklyn	W 92–86 ^{OT}	6–4	Generoso Pope Athletic Complex (575); Brooklyn, NY
12/12/2015*; 7:00 pm		at Columbia	L 56–65	6–5	Levien Gymnasium (1,244); New York City, NY
12/20/2015*; 4:00 pm, FS1		at St. John's	W 83–74	7–5	Carnesecca Arena (4,414); Queens, NY
12/28/2015*; 7:00 pm, ESPN3		Stony Brook	L 61–83	7–6	Fleisher Center (900); Newark, NJ
12/30/2015*; 7:00 pm		at Saint Francis (PA)	W 77–65	8–6	DeGol Arena (632); Loretto, PA
01/02/2016*; 4:00 pm, ESPN3		UMBC	W 86–83	9–6	Fleisher Center (510); Newark, NJ
01/06/2016*; 7:00 pm		at Yale	L 65–83	9–7	Payne Whitney Gymnasium (886); New Haven, CT
Atlantic Sun Conference regular season
01/09/2016; 4:00 pm, ESPN3		USC Upstate	L 78–80	9–8 (0–1)	Fleisher Center (882); Newark, NJ
01/14/2016; 7:00 pm, ESPN3		at Florida Gulf Coast	L 78–82 ^{OT}	9–9 (0–2)	Alico Arena (4,124); Fort Myers, FL
01/16/2016; 3:30 pm, ESPN3		at Stetson	W 71–59	10–9 (1–2)	Edmunds Center (512); DeLand, FL
01/21/2016; 7:00 pm, ESPN3		Jacksonville	W 83–63	11–9 (2–2)	Fleisher Center (755); Newark, NJ
01/24/2016; 6:00 pm, ESPN3		North Florida	L 80–94	11–10 (2–3)	Fleisher Center (555); Newark, NJ
01/27/2016; 8:00 pm, ESPN3		Lipscomb	L 72–81	11–11 (2–4)	Fleisher Center (779); Newark, NJ
01/30/2016; 7:00 pm, ESPN3		at Kennesaw State	W 75–67	12–11 (3–4)	KSU Convocation Center (1,623); Kennesaw, GA
02/01/2016; 7:30 pm, ESPN3		at Lipscomb	W 90–78	13–11 (4–4)	Allen Arena (1,713); Nashville, TN
02/06/2016; 4:00 pm, ESPN3		Kennesaw State	W 78–59	14–11 (5–4)	Fleisher Center (1,322); Newark, NJ
02/11/2016; 7:00 pm, ESPN3		Stetson	W 74–70	15–11 (6–4)	Fleisher Center (805); Newark, NJ
02/13/2016; 4:00 pm, ESPN3		Florida Gulf Coast	W 68–59	16–11 (7–4)	Fleisher Center (1,203); Newark, NJ
02/18/2016; 2:00 pm, ESPN3		at North Florida	L 71–107	16–12 (7–5)	UNF Arena (2,611); Jacksonville, FL
02/20/2016; 7:00 pm, ESPN3		at Jacksonville	W 73–58	17–12 (8–5)	Swisher Gymnasium (1,003); Jacksonville, FL
02/25/2016; 7:00 pm, ESPN3		at USC Upstate	L 71–72	17–13 (8–6)	G. B. Hodge Center (568); Spartanburg, SC
Atlantic Sun Tournament
03/01/2016; 7:30 pm, ESPN3	(2)	(7) Stetson; Quarterfinals	L 67–82	17–14	Fleisher Center (1,022); Newark, NJ
CIT
03/16/2016*; 7:30 pm, ESPN3		Army; First round	W 79–65	18–14	Fleisher Center (855); Newark, NJ
03/21/2016*; 7:30 pm, ESPN3		Boston University; Second round	W 83–72	19–14	Fleisher Center (1,134); Newark, NJ
03/24/2016*; 7:30 pm, ESPN3		Texas–Arlington; Quarterfinals	W 63–60	20–14	Fleisher Center (1,383); Newark, NJ
03/27/2016*; 6:00 pm, CBSSN		at Columbia; Semifinals	L 65–80	20–15	Levien Gymnasium (1,249); New York City, NY
*Non-conference game. ^{#}Rankings from AP Poll. (#) Tournament seedings in parentheses. All times are in Eastern Time.
