= 2015–16 North Florida Ospreys men's basketball team =

American college basketball season

2015–16 North Florida Ospreys men's basketball
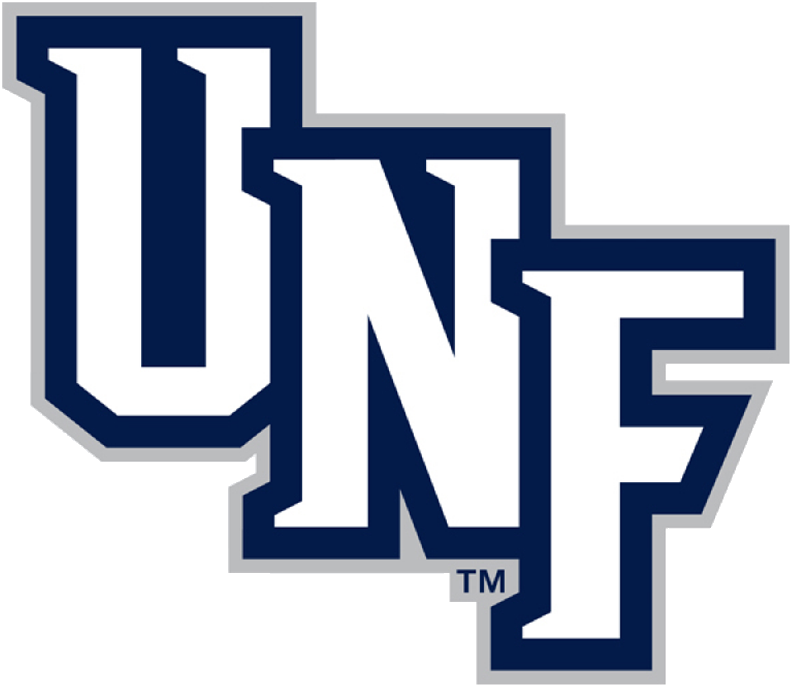

Atlantic Sun regular season champions

NIT, First round
- Conference: Atlantic Sun Conference
- Record: 22–12 (10–4 A-Sun)
- Head coach: Matthew Driscoll (7th season)
- Assistant coaches: Bobby Kennen; Byron Taylor; Stephen Perkins
- Home arena: UNF Arena

2015–16 Atlantic Sun men's basketball standings
	Conf.				Overall
Team	W		L	PCT	W		L	PCT
North Florida	10	–	4	.714	22	–	12	.647
NJIT	8	–	6	.571	20	–	15	.571
Jacksonville	8	–	6	.571	16	–	16	.500
Florida Gulf Coast †	8	–	6	.571	21	–	14	.600
Kennesaw State	7	–	7	.500	11	–	20	.355
Lipscomb	7	–	7	.500	12	–	21	.364
Stetson*	4	–	10	.286	12	–	22	.353
USC Upstate	4	–	10	.286	10	–	22	.313
† 2016 Atlantic Sun Tournament winner *ineligible for the 2016 NCAA tournament due to APR violations

The 2015–16 North Florida Ospreys men's basketball team represented the University of North Florida during the 2015–16 NCAA Division I men's basketball season. The Ospreys were led by seventh-year head coach Matthew Driscoll and played their home games at UNF Arena on the university's campus in Jacksonville, Florida as members of the Atlantic Sun Conference (A-Sun).

For the second year in a row, the Ospreys won the A-Sun regular season championship. They finished the season 22–12, 10–4 in A-Sun play. Guard Dallas Moore was named A-Sun Player of the Year, the first such award for a North Florida player. Driscoll and his staff were named A-Sun Coaching Staff of the Year for the second year in a row.

As the No.1 seed in the Atlantic Sun tournament, they advanced to the semifinals where they were upset at home by Florida Gulf Coast. As a regular season conference champion who failed to win their conference tournament, the Ospreys received an automatic bid to the National Invitation Tournament. As a No. 7 seed, the Ospreys hosted the No. 2 seed Florida in the first round, where they fell 97–68.

The Ospreys made the most three point shots (402) out of all NCAA Division I teams in the 2015–16 season, earning them the nickname "Birds of Trey".

== Previous season ==
The Ospreys finished the 2014–15 season with a program-best overall record of 23–12, and a 12–2 record in conference play. They won the Atlantic Sun Conference tournament and advanced to the NCAA tournament for the first time. As a No. 16 seed in the South Region, they were defeated 81–77 by fellow No. 16 seed Robert Morris in the First Four in Dayton, Ohio.

== Preseason ==
Before the season, Driscoll agreed to a four-year contract extension to remain the team's head coach through 2022.

The Ospreys were picked as preseason favorites to retain their A-Sun Conference title by coaches and media. Multiple players received preseason all-conference honors, including guard/forward Beau Beech who was named A-Sun Preseason Player of the Year.

== Roster ==
2015–16 North Florida Ospreys men's basketball team
Players
Coaches

Pos.	#	Name	Height	Weight	Year	Hometown
F	1	Karlos Odum	6 ft 6 in (1.98 m)	215 lb (98 kg)	RS Fr	Lakeland, Florida
G/F	2	Beau Beech	6 ft 9 in (2.06 m)	215 lb (98 kg)	Sr	Ponte Vedra Beach, Florida
G	3	Chase Driscoll	5 ft 8 in (1.73 m)	190 lb (86 kg)	So	Jacksonville, Florida
G	5	C. J. Fisher (redshirt)	6 ft 2 in (1.88 m)	185 lb (84 kg)	Fr	Miami, Florida
G	10	Osborn Blount	5 ft 10 in (1.78 m)	170 lb (77 kg)	RS So	Jacksonville, Florida
G	11	Trent Mackey	6 ft 3 in (1.91 m)	180 lb (82 kg)	RS Sr	Tampa, Florida
G	12	Aaron Bodager	6 ft 5 in (1.96 m)	200 lb (91 kg)	RS Jr	Oviedo, Florida
G	14	Dallas Moore	6 ft 1 in (1.85 m)	180 lb (82 kg)	Jr	St. Petersburg, Florida
C	15	Ismaila Dauda	6 ft 9 in (2.06 m)	245 lb (111 kg)	RS Sr	Kano, Nigeria
F	22	D'Andre Bernard (redshirt)	6 ft 8 in (2.03 m)	185 lb (84 kg)	Fr	Ajax, Ontario
G	23	Nick Malonga	6 ft 4 in (1.93 m)	180 lb (82 kg)	RS So	Bolingbrook, Illinois
F	32	Demarcus Daniels	6 ft 8 in (2.03 m)	200 lb (91 kg)	Sr	Ashburn, Georgia
C	33	Romelo Banks (injured)	6 ft 11 in (2.11 m)	245 lb (111 kg)	Jr	Kissimmee, Florida
F	35	Chris Davenport	6 ft 8 in (2.03 m)	225 lb (102 kg)	Jr	Atlanta, Georgia

Head coach

- Matthew Driscoll (7th year)

Assistant coach(es)

- Bobby Kennen (7th year)
- Byron Taylor (5th year)
- Stephen Perkins (3rd year)

Legend

- (C) Team captain
- (S) Suspended
- (I) Ineligible
- (W) Walk-on
- Injured
- Current redshirt

Roster
Last update: November 26, 2015

== Schedule and results ==
=== November ===
The Ospreys carried their previous season's momentum right into their first game by earning a road upset of Illinois by a score of 93–81. In a game that UNF never trailed, the Ospreys set a program record (at the time) for three-point-shots made with 17. It was the program's second victory over a Big Ten Conference opponent, with the first coming in December 2014 at Purdue. In their home opener, the Ospreys blew out Texas–Rio Grande Valley, 106–84. For the second straight game they connected on 17 three-point-shots, tying the program record. They improved to 2–0 for the first time since the 2005–06 season. It was just the third time UNF has reached 100 points since joining Division I. Guard Dallas Moore recorded his second straight double-double and became UNF's 11th player to score 1,000 career points. On November 18, coach Matthew Driscoll surpassed Matt Kilcullen to become the winningest coach in program history with a 98–69 win over crosstown rival and NAIA member Edward Waters. With the win, UNF started the season 3–0 for the first time since the 1994–95 season when they were members of Division II. Over the next two games, the Ospreys trailed at halftime by only two points at Louisville and one point at Saint Louis, however, they went on to lose those games by margins of 28 and 13 respectively. They won three consecutive games to finish November with a record of 6–2.

=== December ===
On December 2, Moore and Beech each scored 31 points (a career high for Beech) in a 108–119 loss at LSU. The Ospreys led 56–48 at halftime, but 43 points by freshman phenom Ben Simmons proved too much for UNF to handle. The Ospreys once again set a program record for three-point-shots made with 19. In their next game, they trailed at Dayton by only three points at halftime, but lost by a margin of 15. On December 12 against Coastal Georgia, the Ospreys scored the most points in program history with a 117–71 victory. In December, North Florida swept a four-game home stand to extend their winning streak at UNF Arena to 14 games, a program record. The Ospreys then lost two in a row at Arkansas and at VCU to close out the month of December.

=== January ===
On January 2, the Ospreys won at Eastern Michigan, 82–77, to finish their non-conference schedule with a record of 11–6. In the game, senior forward Demarcus Daniels set the program record for career blocks with 146. Their 11 wins marked the most non-conference victories in program history. On January 9, the Ospreys defeated crosstown rival Jacksonville for the fifth time in a row in the River City Rumble. On January 16, the Ospreys defeated Kennesaw State, 93–78, despite trailing by 14 points in the first half. In the game, guard Beau Beech scored a career high 33 points, and UNF extended its home winning streak to 17 games. On January 24 in a win at NJIT, the Ospreys made a program record 20 three-point-shots, a record that was broken or tied four times in the 2015–16 season.

=== February ===
The Ospreys had improved to 7–0 in conference play until losing at home to Stetson on February 1. The loss snapped an 18-game home winning streak. The Ospreys lost the following three games, all on the road, to fall into a three-way tie for first place in the A-Sun at 7–4. They snapped their losing streak by defeating NJIT at home, 107–71 on February 18. On February 20, the Ospreys clinched at least a share of the Atlantic Sun regular season title by defeating USC Upstate, 81–78. They secured the regular season championship and No. 1 seed in the Atlantic Sun Tournament with a win at crosstown rival Jacksonville.

=== March ===
The Ospreys began their quest to win back-to-back Atlantic Sun Tournament titles by defeating USC Upstate in the quarterfinals, 92–69. However, they were blown-out by 33 points in the semifinals by Florida Gulf Coast. Their 56 points were the fewest they scored in any game this season. Due to renovations at the O'Connell Center, the 7-seed Ospreys hosted the 2-seed Florida Gators in the first round of the 2016 National Invitation Tournament, where they fell 97–68 in front of 6,011 fans at the UNF Arena.

Date time, TV	Rank^{#}	Opponent^{#}	Result	Record	High points	High rebounds	High assists	Site (attendance) city, state
Non-conference regular season
November 13*; 8:00 pm, BTN+		at Illinois	W 93–81	1–0	26 – Moore	9 – Daniels	10 – Moore	Prairie Capital Convention Center (5,186); Springfield, IL
November 16*; 7:00 pm, ESPN3		Texas–Rio Grande Valley	W 106–84	2–0	26 – Davenport	10 – Daniels	10 – Moore	UNF Arena (2,718); Jacksonville, FL
November 18*; 7:00 pm, ESPN3		Edward Waters	W 98–69	3–0	24 – Moore	13 – Davenport	7 – Davenport	UNF Arena (1,807); Jacksonville, FL
November 21*; Noon, ESPN3		at Louisville; Brooklyn Hoops Holiday Invitational	L 61–89	3–1	21 – Moore	5 – Davenport	5 – Beech	KFC Yum! Center (20,413); Louisville, KY
November 24*; 8:00 pm, FS Midwest		at Saint Louis; Brooklyn Hoops Holiday Invitational	L 57–70	3–2	16 – Moore	7 – Tied	6 – Moore	Chaifetz Arena (5,826); St. Louis, MO
November 27*; 7:00 pm		at Hartford; Brooklyn Hoops Holiday Invitational	W 81–60	4–2	16 – Moore	14 – Moore	7 – Moore	Chase Arena at Reich Family Pavilion (539); Hartford, CT
November 28*; 7:00 pm		vs. St. Francis Brooklyn; Brooklyn Hoops Holiday Invitational	W 78–65	5–2	20 – Davenport	6 – Tied	7 – Davenport	Chase Arena at Reich Family Pavilion (152); Hartford, CT
November 30*; 7:00 pm, ESPN3		Trinity Baptist	W 80–72	6–2	20 – Moore	11 – Davenport	5 – Moore	UNF Arena (1,923); Jacksonville, FL
December 2*; 8:00 pm, SECN+		at LSU	L 108–119	6–3	31 – Tied	7 – Moore	5 – Tied	Pete Maravich Assembly Center (8,981); Baton Rouge, LA
December 5*; 2:00 pm, FS Ohio		at Dayton	L 71–86	6–4	18 – Beech	7 – Moore	6 – Moore	UD Arena (12,383); Dayton, OH
December 12*; 7:00 pm, ESPN3		Coastal Georgia	W 117–71	7–4	20 – Daniels	7 – Davenport	5 – Tied	UNF Arena (1,426); Jacksonville, FL
December 14*; 7:00 pm, ESPN3		FIU	W 94–72	8–4	21 – Moore	8 – Beech	5 – Mackey	UNF Arena (1,448); Jacksonville, FL
December 16*; 7:30 pm, ESPN3		Austin Peay	W 80–70	9–4	18 – Davenport	8 – Tied	8 – Moore	UNF Arena (1,336); Jacksonville, FL
December 19*; 7:00 pm, ESPN3		Florida A&M	W 87–70	10–4	25 – Moore	7 – Tied	6 – Tied	UNF Arena (1,618); Jacksonville, FL
December 22*; 8:00 pm, SECN+		at Arkansas	L 72–97	10–5	17 – Moore	6 – Beech	7 – Moore	Bud Walton Arena (14,794); Fayetteville, AR
December 30*; 7:00 pm, CBS6		at VCU	L 68–80	10–6	24 – Moore	7 – Bodager	3 – Mackey	Siegel Center (7,637); Richmond, VA
January 2* Noon, ESPN3		at Eastern Michigan	W 82–77	11–6	23 – Beech	10 – Davenport	7 – Davenport	Convocation Center (1,081); Ypsilanti, MI
Atlantic Sun Conference regular season
January 6; 7:00 pm, ESPN3		at Stetson	W 97–79	12–6 (1–0)	30 – Moore	16 – Davenport	9 – Davenport	Edmunds Center (515); DeLand, FL
January 9; 7:00 pm, ESPN3		Jacksonville; River City Rumble	W 83–68	13–6 (2–0)	22 – Daniels	11 – Davenport	6 – Moore	UNF Arena (5,807); Jacksonville, FL
January 14; 7:00 pm, ESPN3		Lipscomb	W 95–83	14–6 (3–0)	24 – Mackey	10 – Beech	7 – Moore	UNF Arena (1,868); Jacksonville, FL
January 16; 7:00 pm, ESPN3		Kennesaw State	W 93–78	15–6 (4–0)	33 – Beech	10 – Davenport	6 – Moore	UNF Arena (2,131); Jacksonville, FL
January 21; 7:00 pm, ESPN3		at USC Upstate	W 78–62	16–6 (5–0)	16 – Tied	9 – Tied	5 – Tied	G. B. Hodge Center (621); Spartanburg, SC
January 24^{[a]} 6:00 pm, ESPN3		at NJIT	W 94–80	17–6 (6–0)	29 – Moore	7 – Beech	8 – Moore	Fleisher Center (555); Newark, NJ
January 30; 7:00 pm, ESPN3		Florida Gulf Coast	W 82–76	18–6 (7–0)	27 – Beech	8 – Beech	8 – Moore	UNF Arena (4,138); Jacksonville, FL
February 1; 7:00 pm, ESPN3		Stetson	L 82–86	18–7 (7–1)	25 – Moore	9 – Beech	4 – Tied	UNF Arena (2,004); Jacksonville, FL
February 6; 7:00 pm, ESPN3		at Florida Gulf Coast	L 65–81	18–8 (7–2)	20 – Beech	9 – Beech	5 – Moore	Alico Arena (4,522); Fort Myers, FL
February 11; 7:00 pm, ESPN3		at Kennesaw State	L 91–101	18–9 (7–3)	21 – Daniels	7 – Davenport	7 – Moore	KSU Convocation Center (1,158); Kennesaw, GA
February 13; 5:00 pm, ESPN3		at Lipscomb	L 87–94	18–10 (7–4)	27 – Moore	10 – Beech	6 – Moore	Allen Arena (2,219); Nashville, TN
February 18; 7:00 pm, ESPN3		NJIT	W 107–71	19–10 (8–4)	25 – Daniels	6 – Davenport	11 – Moore	UNF Arena (2,611); Jacksonville, FL
February 20; 7:00 pm, ESPN3		USC Upstate	W 81–78	20–10 (9–4)	23 – Daniels	8 – Tied	9 – Moore	UNF Arena (4,086); Jacksonville, FL
February 25; 7:00 pm, ESPN3		at Jacksonville; River City Rumble	W 81–80	21–10 (10–4)	22 – Moore	9 – Davenport	5 – Moore	Swisher Gymnasium (1,500); Jacksonville, FL
Atlantic Sun tournament
March 1; 7:30 pm, ESPN3	(1)	(8) USC Upstate; Quarterfinals	W 92–69	22–10	22 – Moore	10 – Beech	7 – Moore	UNF Arena (3,317); Jacksonville, FL
March 3; 7:30 pm, ESPN3	(1)	(4) Florida Gulf Coast; Semifinals	L 56–89	22–11	15 – Moore	5 – Davenport	5 – Moore	UNF Arena (4,305); Jacksonville, FL
National Invitation tournament
March 15*; 9:00 pm, ESPNU	(7)	(2) Florida; First round – Monmouth Bracket	L 68–97	22–12	23 – Moore	7 – Moore	5 – Moore	UNF Arena (6,011); Jacksonville, FL
*Non-conference game. ^{#}Rankings from AP Poll. (#) Tournament seedings in parentheses. All times are in Eastern Time.

NOTES:

^{^[a]}Game postponed from Saturday, January 23 at 4 pm to Sunday, January 24 at 6 pm due to Winter Storm Jonas.

== Awards and honors ==
Beau Beech, guard

- Atlantic Sun All-Conference First Team
- Atlantic Sun Player of the Week (Jan. 11–17). Beech averaged 27 points, 9 rebounds, and 3 assists in two wins over Lipscomb and Kennesaw State.
- Preseason Atlantic Sun Player of the Year
- Preseason Atlantic Sun All-Conference Team

Demarcus Daniels, forward

- Atlantic Sun Defensive Player of the Year
- Atlantic Sun All-Academic Team
- Atlantic Sun Player of the Week (Jan. 4–10). Daniels averaged 22 points, 9.5 rebounds, and 2.5 blocks in two wins over Stetson and Jacksonville.
- Atlantic Sun Co-Player of the Week (Feb. 15–21). Daniels averaged 24 points, 6.5 rebounds, 2.5 assists, and 2.5 blocks in two wins over NJIT and USC Upstate. Scored a career high 25 points versus NJIT.
- Preseason Atlantic Sun Defensive Player of the Year
- Preseason Atlantic Sun All-Conference Team

Chris Davenport, forward

- Preseason Atlantic Sun All-Conference Team

Head Coach Matthew Driscoll and staff

- Atlantic Sun Coaching Staff of the Year

Trent Mackey, guard

- Atlantic Sun Scholar-Athlete of the Year
- Atlantic Sun All-Academic Team

Dallas Moore, guard

- Atlantic Sun Player of the Year
- Atlantic Sun All-Conference First Team
- Atlantic Sun All-Tournament Team
- Atlantic Sun Co-Player of the Week (Nov. 13–15). Moore recorded 26 points, 10 assists, and no turnovers in a road upset of Illinois.
- Atlantic Sun Player of the Week (Nov. 23–29). Moore averaged 16.0 points, 8.7 rebounds, and 5.7 assists in a loss at Saint Louis, a win at Hartford, and a neutral site win over St. Francis Brooklyn.
- Atlantic Sun Player of the Week (Jan. 18–24). Moore averaged 22.5 points, 5 rebounds, 6.5 assists, and 2.5 steals in two road wins over USC Upstate and NJIT.
- Preseason Atlantic Sun All-Conference Team
