= 2015–16 Lipscomb Bisons men's basketball team =

American college basketball season

2015–16 Lipscomb Bisons men's basketball
- Conference: Atlantic Sun Conference
- Record: 12–21 (7–7 A-Sun)
- Head coach: Casey Alexander (3rd season)
- Assistant coach: Roger Idstrom; Steve Drabyn; Sean Rutigliano
- Home arena: Allen Arena

2015–16 Atlantic Sun men's basketball standings
	Conf.				Overall
Team	W		L	PCT	W		L	PCT
North Florida	10	–	4	.714	22	–	12	.647
NJIT	8	–	6	.571	20	–	15	.571
Jacksonville	8	–	6	.571	16	–	16	.500
Florida Gulf Coast †	8	–	6	.571	21	–	14	.600
Kennesaw State	7	–	7	.500	11	–	20	.355
Lipscomb	7	–	7	.500	12	–	21	.364
Stetson*	4	–	10	.286	12	–	22	.353
USC Upstate	4	–	10	.286	10	–	22	.313
† 2016 Atlantic Sun Tournament winner *ineligible for the 2016 NCAA tournament due to APR violations

The 2015–16 Lipscomb Bisons men's basketball team represented Lipscomb University during the 2015–16 NCAA Division I men's basketball season. The Bisons, led by third year head coach Casey Alexander, played their home games at Allen Arena and were members of the Atlantic Sun Conference. They finished the season 12–21, 7–7 in A-Sun play to finish in a tie for fifth place. They defeated Jacksonville in the quarterfinals of the A-Sun tournament to advance to the semifinals where they lost to Stetson.

== Roster ==
Number	Name	Position	Height	Weight	Year	Hometown
0	Rob Marberry	Center	6–7	220	Sophomore	Nashville, Tennessee
1	Cam Miller	Guard	6–2	175	Junior	Franklin, Tennessee
2	Josh Williams	Guard	6–5	210	Junior	Jackson, Mississippi
4	Nathan Moran	Guard	5–9	160	Sophomore	Franklin, Tennessee
5	J. J. Butler	Guard	6–2	190	Junior	Abingdon, Maryland
10	Talbott Denny	Guard	6–6	210	Senior	Tucson, Arizona
11	Asa Duvall	Guard	6–2	195	Sophomore	Brentwood, Tennessee
12	J. C. Hampton	Guard	6–0	180	Junior	Gainesville, Georgia
14	Garrison Mathews	Guard	6–5	215	Freshman	Franklin, Tennessee
15	Dylan Green	Guard	6–4	200	Junior	Anaheim Hills, CA
20	Jalen Lawson	Guard	5–10	165	Freshman	Brentwood, Tennessee
21	Charles Smith	Center	6–9	235	Junior	Memphis, Tennessee
22	Eli Pepper	Forward	6–8	200	Sophomore	Princeton, Kentucky
23	Aaron Korn	Guard	6–4	205	Sophomore	Frankton, Indiana
32	Brett Wishon	Forward	6–9	245	Junior	Concord, North Carolina
33	David Wishon	Center	7–2	285	Senior	Concord, North Carolina
55	George Brammeier	Center	6–10	240	Sophomore	Brandon, Florida

== Schedule ==
Date time, TV	Rank^{#}	Opponent^{#}	Result	Record	Site (attendance) city, state
Non-conference regular season
11/13/2015*; 9:00 pm		at Santa Clara; Cable Car Classic	W 65–63 ^{2OT}	1–0	Leavey Center (1,552); Santa Clara, CA
11/14/2015*; 7:30 pm		vs. Milwaukee; Cable Car Classic	L 65–71	1–1	Leavey Center (1,150); Santa Clara, CA
11/15/2015*; 2:00 pm		vs. Denver; Cable Car Classic	L 69–82	1–2	Leavey Center (1,314); Santa Clara, CA
11/17/2015*; 6:30 pm, ESPN3		Oakland City; Men Against Breast Cancer Classic	W 96–69	2–2	Allen Arena (497); Nashville, TN
11/20/2015*; 6:00 pm		at Miami (OH); Men Against Breast Cancer Classic	L 68–70	2–3	Millett Hall (1,255); Oxford, OH
11/21/2015*; 12:30 pm		vs. Northeastern; Men Against Breast Cancer Classic	L 67–79	2–4	Millett Hall (1,196); Oxford, OH
11/22/2015*; 11:00 am		vs. Florida Atlantic; Men Against Breast Cancer Classic	W 79–65	3–4	Millett Hall (1,174); Oxford, OH
11/27/2015*; 1:00 pm, SECN+		at South Carolina	L 76–92	3–5	Colonial Life Arena (8,793); Columbia, SC
12/01/2015*; 5:00 pm		at Belmont	L 89–105	3–6	Curb Event Center (3,094); Nashville, TN
12/05/2015*; 4:00 pm, ESPN3		Tennessee Tech	L 78–81	3–7	Allen Arena (1,620); Nashville, TN
12/07/2015*; 6:30 pm, ESPN3		Belmont	L 84–93	3–8	Allen Arena (4,420); Nashville, TN
12/10/2015*; 6:30 pm, ESPN3		Cumberland	W 83–53	4–8	Allen Arena (1,104); Nashville, TN
12/12/2015*; 4:00 pm, ESPN3		Princeton	L 64–78	4–9	Allen Arena (1,445); Nashville, TN
12/17/2015*; 7:00 pm		at Tennessee State	L 86–89	4–10	Gentry Complex (540); Nashville, TN
12/20/2015*; 2:00 pm, ESPN3		Austin Peay	L 84–92	4–11	Allen Arena (1,255); Nashville, TN
12/29/2015*; 6:30 pm, ESPN3		Chattanooga	L 56–80	4–12	Allen Arena (1,392); Nashville, TN
01/02/2016*; 6:00 pm		at Akron	L 73–80	4–13	James A. Rhodes Arena (3,652); Akron, OH
Atlantic Sun Conference regular season
01/09/2016; 3:30 pm, ESPN3		at Kennesaw State	L 86–102	4–14 (0–1)	KSU Convocation Center (1,253); Kennesaw, GA
01/14/2016; 6:00 pm, ESPN3		at North Florida	L 83–95	4–15 (0–2)	UNF Arena (1,868); Jacksonville, FL
01/16/2016; 6:00 pm, ESPN3		at Jacksonville	L 73–76	4–16 (0–3)	Swisher Gymnasium (736); Jacksonville, FL
01/21/2016; 6:30 pm, ESPN3		Stetson	W 92–87	5–16 (1–3)	Allen Arena (1,232); Nashville, TN
01/24/2016; 1:00 pm, ESPN3		Florida Gulf Coast	W 91–75	6–16 (2–3)	Allen Arena (1,183); Nashville, TN
01/27/2016; 7:00 pm, ESPN3		at NJIT	W 81–72	7–16 (3–3)	Fleisher Center (779); Newark, NJ
01/30/2016; 4:00 pm, ESPN3		USC Upstate	L 91–92 ^{OT}	7–17 (3–4)	Allen Arena (2,374); Nashville, TN
02/01/2016; 6:30 pm, ESPN3		NJIT	L 78–90	7–18 (3–5)	Allen Arena (1,713); Nashville, TN
02/06/2016; 1:00 pm, ESPN3		at USC Upstate	W 78–65	8–18 (4–5)	G. B. Hodge Center (692); Spartanburg, SC
02/11/2016; 6:30 pm, ESPN3		Jacksonville	W 93–92	9–18 (5–5)	Allen Arena (1,175); Nashville, TN
02/13/2016; 4:00 pm, ESPN3		North Florida	W 94–87	10–18 (6–5)	Allen Arena (2,219); Nashville, TN
02/18/2016; 6:00 pm, ESPN3		at Florida Gulf Coast	L 67–82	10–19 (6–6)	Alico Arena (4,271); Fort Myers, FL
02/20/2016; 2:30 pm, ESPN3		at Stetson	W 77–74	11–19 (7–6)	Edmunds Center (761); DeLand, FL
02/25/2016; 6:30 pm, ESPN3		Kennesaw State	L 57–73	11–20 (7–7)	Allen Arena (1,823); Nashville, TN
Atlantic Sun tournament
03/01/2016; 7:00 pm, ESPN3	(6)	at (3) Jacksonville; Quarterfinals	W 92–89 ^{OT}	12–20	Swisher Gymnasium (747); Jacksonville, FL
03/03/2016; 6:00 pm, ESPN3	(6)	(7) Stetson; Semifinals	L 75–96	12–21	Allen Arena (2,465); Nashville, TN
*Non-conference game. ^{#}Rankings from AP poll. (#) Tournament seedings in parentheses. All times are in Central Time.
