= 2015–16 Jacksonville Dolphins men's basketball team =

American college basketball season

2015–16 Jacksonville Dolphins men's basketball
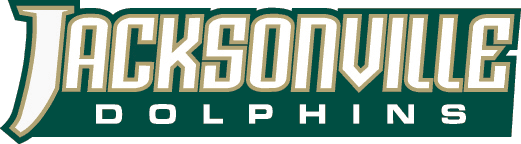
- Conference: Atlantic Sun Conference
- Record: 16–16 (8–6 A-Sun)
- Head coach: Tony Jasick (2nd season)
- Assistant coach: Dan Bere'; Scott Wagers; Azeez Ali
- Home arena: Swisher Gymnasium

2015–16 Atlantic Sun men's basketball standings
	Conf.				Overall
Team	W		L	PCT	W		L	PCT
North Florida	10	–	4	.714	22	–	12	.647
NJIT	8	–	6	.571	20	–	15	.571
Jacksonville	8	–	6	.571	16	–	16	.500
Florida Gulf Coast †	8	–	6	.571	21	–	14	.600
Kennesaw State	7	–	7	.500	11	–	20	.355
Lipscomb	7	–	7	.500	12	–	21	.364
Stetson*	4	–	10	.286	12	–	22	.353
USC Upstate	4	–	10	.286	10	–	22	.313
† 2016 Atlantic Sun Tournament winner *ineligible for the 2016 NCAA tournament due to APR violations

The 2015–16 Jacksonville Dolphins men's basketball team represented Jacksonville University during the 2015–16 NCAA Division I men's basketball season. The Dolphins were members of the Atlantic Sun Conference (A-Sun). They were led by second year head coach Tony Jasick and played their home games at Swisher Gymnasium on the University's Jacksonville, Florida campus. They finished the season 16–16, 8–6 in A-Sun play to finish in a three way tie for second place. They lost in the quarterfinals of the A-Sun tournament to Lipscomb.

== Roster ==
Number	Name	Position	Height	Weight	Year	Hometown
0	Marcellous Bell	Guard	5–11	170	Senior	Hyattsville, Maryland
2	Shea Jones	Guard	6–1	175	Junior	Weston, Florida
5	Darius Dawkins	Forward	6–7	200	Junior	McLeansville, North Carolina
10	Darien Fernandez	Guard	5–8	185	Junior	Wareham, Massachusetts
11	Omar El Manasterly	Forward	6–6	220	Junior	Sugar Land, Texas
13	Marcel White	Forward	6–6	220	Junior	Lake Wales, Florida
15	J. R. Holder	Forward	6–7	180	Junior	Atlanta, Georgia
22	Andris Misters	Guard	6–5	200	Senior	Jelgava, Latvia
23	Cartee Pettis	Guard	6–2	180	Junior	Oviedo, Florida
25	Antwon Clayton	Forward	6–6	200	Sophomore	Eustis, Florida
32	Josh Adeyeye	Guard/Forward	6–5	220	Senior	Fayetteville, North Carolina
33	Cody Helgeland	Forward	6–8	185	Senior	Toccoa, Georgia
34	Demontrez Austin	Forward	6–7	210	Junior	Guyton, Georgia
55	Kori Babineaux	Guard	6–4	205	Senior	Folsom, California

== Schedule ==
Date time, TV	Rank^{#}	Opponent^{#}	Result	Record	Site (attendance) city, state
Non-conference regular season
11/14/2015*; 2:00 pm		at Appalachian State	L 68–76	0–1	Holmes Center (767); Boone, NC
11/17/2015*; 7:00 pm, ESPN3		at Florida State	L 79–98	0–2	Donald L. Tucker Civic Center (5,943); Tallahassee, FL
11/20/2015*; 7:00 pm, ESPN3		Florida College	W 81–63	1–2	Swisher Gymnasium (413); Jacksonville, FL
11/23/2015*; 7:00 pm, ESPN3		Thomas	W 92–64	2–2	Swisher Gymnasium (377); Jacksonville, FL
11/27/2015*; 4:30 pm		vs. IPFW; Spartan Showcase	L 63–71	2–3	Greensboro Coliseum (1,383); Greensboro, NC
11/28/2015*; 4:30 pm		vs. Navy; Spartan Showcase	L 65–71	2–4	Greensboro Coliseum (1,389); Greensboro, NC
11/29/2015*; Noon		at UNC Greensboro; Spartan Showcase	L 69–71	2–5	Greensboro Coliseum (1,349); Greensboro, NC
12/02/2015*; 7:00 pm, ESPN3		Florida Memorial	W 92–73	3–5	Swisher Gymnasium (478); Jacksonville, FL
12/05/2015*; 4:00 pm		at Jacksonville State	W 86–82	4–5	Pete Mathews Coliseum (1,012); Jacksonville, AL
12/12/2015*; 2:00 pm		at South Carolina State	L 74–81	4–6	SHM Memorial Center (169); Orangeburg, SC
12/16/2015*; 7:00 pm		at South Florida	L 75–88	4–7	USF Sun Dome (2,628); Tampa, FL
12/21/2015*; 7:00 pm, ESPN3		Florida A&M	W 68–66	5–7	Swisher Gymnasium (537); Jacksonville, FL
12/22/2015*; 7:00 pm, SECN+		at Florida	L 65–89	5–8	O'Connell Center (9,083); Gainesville, FL
12/29/2015*; 7:00 pm, ESPN3		Marist	W 69–68	6–8	Swisher Gymnasium (259); Jacksonville, FL
12/31/2015*; 2:00 pm, ESPN3		Bethune-Cookman	W 74–70	7–8	Swisher Gymansium (273); Jacksonville, FL
01/02/2016*; 1:00 pm, ESPN3		at Western Michigan	L 72–76	7–9	University Arena (2,343); Kalamazoo, MI
01/05/2016*; 7:00 pm, ESPN3		Trinity Baptist	W 84–45	8–9	Swisher Gymnasium (397); Jacksonville, FL
Atlantic Sun Conference regular season
01/09/2016; 7:00 pm, ESPN3		at North Florida	L 68–83	8–10 (0–1)	UNF Arena (5,807); Jacksonville, FL
01/14/2016; 7:00 pm, ESPN3		Kennesaw State	W 83–70	9–10 (1–1)	Swisher Gymnasium (572); Jacksonville, FL
01/16/2016; 7:00 pm, ESPN3		Lipscomb	W 76–73	10–10 (2–1)	Swisher Gymnasium (736); Jacksonville, FL
01/21/2016; 7:00 pm, ESPN3		at NJIT	L 63–83	10–11 (2–2)	Fleisher Center (755); Newark, NJ
01/23/2016; 2:00 pm, ESPN3		at USC Upstate	W 77–68	11–11 (3–2)	G. B. Hodge Center (474); Spartanburg, SC
01/27/2016; 7:00 pm, ESPN3		at Florida Gulf Coast	W 78–69	12–11 (4–2)	Alico Arena (4,014); Fort Myers, FL
01/30/2016; 7:00 pm, ESPN3		Stetson	W 75–60	13–11 (5–2)	Swisher Gymnasium (877); Jacksonville, FL
02/01/2016; 7:00 pm, ESPN3		Florida Gulf Coast	W 83–80	14–11 (6–2)	Swisher Gymnasium (778); Jacksonville, FL
02/06/2016; 3:15 pm, ESPN3		at Stetson	W 96–88 ^{OT}	15–11 (7–2)	Edmunds Center (1,013); DeLand, FL
02/11/2016; 6:30 pm, ESPN3		at Lipscomb	L 92–93	15–12 (7–3)	Allen Arena (1,175); Nashville, TN
02/13/2016; 4:30 pm, ESPN3		at Kennesaw State	L 69–90	15–13 (7–4)	KSU Convocation Center (1,317); Kennesaw, GA
02/18/2016; 7:00 pm, ESPN3		USC Upstate	W 81–76	16–13 (8–4)	Swisher Gymnasium (628); Jacksonville, FL
02/20/2016; 7:00 pm, ESPN3		NJIT	L 58–73	16–14 (8–5)	Swisher Gymnasium (1,003); Jacksonville, FL
02/25/2016; 7:00 pm, ESPN3		North Florida	L 80–81	16–15 (8–6)	Swisher Gymnasium (1,507); Jacksonville, FL
Atlantic Sun tournament
03/01/2016; 7:00 pm, ESPN3	(3)	(6) Lipscomb; Quarterfinals	L 89–92 ^{OT}	16–16	Swisher Gymnasium (747); Jacksonville, FL
*Non-conference game. ^{#}Rankings from AP Poll. (#) Tournament seedings in parentheses. All times are in Eastern Time.
