= 2015–16 Kennesaw State Owls men's basketball team =

American college basketball season

2015–16 Kennesaw State Owls men's basketball
- Conference: Atlantic Sun Conference
- Record: 11–20 (7–7 A-Sun)
- Head coach: Al Skinner (1st season)
- Assistant coach: Michael Cotton; Carlton Owens; Stephen Cox
- Home arena: KSU Convocation Center

2015–16 Atlantic Sun men's basketball standings
	Conf.				Overall
Team	W		L	PCT	W		L	PCT
North Florida	10	–	4	.714	22	–	12	.647
NJIT	8	–	6	.571	20	–	15	.571
Jacksonville	8	–	6	.571	16	–	16	.500
Florida Gulf Coast †	8	–	6	.571	21	–	14	.600
Kennesaw State	7	–	7	.500	11	–	20	.355
Lipscomb	7	–	7	.500	12	–	21	.364
Stetson*	4	–	10	.286	12	–	22	.353
USC Upstate	4	–	10	.286	10	–	22	.313
† 2016 Atlantic Sun Tournament winner *ineligible for the 2016 NCAA tournament due to APR violations

The 2015–16 Kennesaw State Owls men's basketball team represented Kennesaw State University during the 2015–16 NCAA Division I men's basketball season. The Owls were led by first-year head coach Al Skinner and played their home games at the KSU Convocation Center on the university's campus in Kennesaw, Georgia, as members of the Atlantic Sun Conference (A-Sun). They finished the season 11–20, 7–7 in A-Sun play to finish in a tie for fifth place. They lost in the quarterfinals of the A-Sun tournament to Florida Gulf Coast.

== Roster ==
Number	Name	Position	Height	Weight	Year	Hometown
0	Kendrick Ray	Guard	6–1	180	RS junior	Middletown, New York
1	Nigel Pruitt	Forward	6–7	180	Senior	Potomac, Maryland
2	Jordan Jones	Forward	6–8	205	RS sophomore	Alpharetta, Georgia
3	Tracy Hector	Forward	6–4	212	Freshman	Jonesboro, Georgia
4	Yonel Brown	Guard	5–9	160	Senior	Lawrenceville, Georgia
5	Bernard Morena	Forward	6–8	200	Junior	Ivory Coast
11	Kyle Clarke	Guard	6–5	188	Freshman	Daytona Beach, Florida
14	Aubrey Williams	Forward	6–6	225	RS junior	Bowie, Maryland
15	Cameron Neysmith	Guard	6–4	220	Junior	Norcross, Georgia
21	Nick Masterson	Guard	6–5	180	Sophomore	Woodstock, Georgia
24	Josh Burnett	Guard	6–5	182	Freshman	Honolulu, Hawaii
33	Kasta Jankovic	Forward	6–7	200	Freshman	Belgrade, Serbia

== Schedule ==
Date time, TV	Rank^{#}	Opponent^{#}	Result	Record	Site (attendance) city, state
Non-conference regular season
11/13/2015*; 8:30 pm, SECN+		at Alabama	L 64–77	0–1	Coleman Coliseum (15,043); Tuscaloosa, AL
11/16/2015*; 9:00 pm, ESPN2		at No. 23 LSU; Legends Classic	L 69–91	0–2	Pete Maravich Assembly Center (9,654); Baton Rouge, LA
11/18/2015*; 8:30 pm, P12N		at Arizona State; Legends Classic	L 53–91	0–3	Wells Fargo Arena (4,197); Tempe, AZ
11/21/2015*; 8:00 pm		at Samford	L 65–77	0–4	Pete Hanna Center (724); Homewood, AL
11/23/2015*; 6:30 pm		IUPUI; Legends Classic	W 71–63	1–4	KSU Convocation Center (1,262); Kennesaw, GA
11/24/2015*; 5:30 pm		Belmont; Legends Classic	L 55–80	1–5	KSU Convocation Center (812); Kennesaw, GA
11/28/2015*; 7:00 pm, ESPN3		Tennessee State	L 49–56	1–6	KSU Convocation Center (884); Kennesaw, GA
11/30/2015*; 7:00 pm		at Elon	L 93–103	1–7	Alumni Gym (963); Elon, NC
12/02/2015*; 7:00 pm		Florida A&M	W 61–41	2–7	KSU Convocation Center (2,058); Kennesaw, GA
12/05/2015*; 12:30 pm, ESPN3		at No. 20 West Virginia	L 54–87	2–8	WVU Coliseum (8,731); Morgantown, WV
12/07/2015*; 7:00 pm		Thomas	W 69–59	3–8	KSU Convocation Center (1,254); Kennesaw, GA
12/16/2015*; 7:00 pm, ESPNU		at No. 19 Louisville	L 57–94	3–9	KFC Yum! Center (19,288); Louisville, KY
12/18/2015*; 7:00 pm		at Chattanooga	L 66–78	3–10	McKenzie Arena (2,421); Chattanooga, TN
12/22/2015*; 7:00 pm, BTN		at Indiana	L 72–99	3–11	Assembly Hall (15,721); Bloomington, IN
12/30/2015*; 2:00 pm, ESPN3		Mercer	L 73–76	3–12	KSU Convocation Center (1,903); Kennesaw, GA
01/04/2016*; 2:00 pm		Reinhardt	W 103–71	4–12	KSU Convocation Center (936); Kennesaw, GA
Atlantic Sun Conference regular season
01/09/2016; 4:30 pm, ESPN3		Lipscomb	W 102–86	5–12 (1–0)	KSU Convocation Center (1,253); Kennesaw, GA
01/14/2016; 7:00 pm, ESPN3		at Jacksonville	L 70–83	5–13 (1–1)	Swisher Gymnasium (572); Jacksonville, FL
01/16/2016; 7:00 pm, ESPN3		at North Florida	L 78–93	5–14 (1–2)	UNF Arena (2,131); Jacksonville, FL
01/21/2016; 7:00 pm, ESPN3		Florida Gulf Coast	L 74–79	5–15 (1–3)	KSU Convocation Center (1,809); Kennesaw, GA
01/23/2016; 4:30 pm, ESPN3		Stetson	L 79–84	5–16 (1–4)	KSU Convocation Center (1,909); Kennesaw, GA
01/27/2016; 7:00 pm, ESPN3		at USC Upstate	W 78–75	6–16 (2–4)	G. B. Hodge Center (670); Spartanburg, SC
01/30/2016; 4:30 pm, ESPN3		NJIT	L 67–75	6–17 (2–5)	KSU Convocation Center (1,623); Kennesaw, GA
02/01/2016; 7:00 pm, ESPN3		USC Upstate	W 75–62	7–17 (3–5)	KSU Convocation Center (1,109); Kennesaw, GA
02/06/2016; 4:00 pm, ESPN3		at NJIT	L 59–78	7–18 (3–6)	Fleisher Center (1,322); Newark, NJ
02/11/2016; 7:00 pm, ESPN3		North Florida	W 101–91	8–18 (4–6)	KSU Convocation Center (1,158); Kennesaw, GA
02/13/2016; 4:30 pm, ESPN3		Jacksonville	W 90–69	9–18 (5–6)	KSU Convocation Center (1,317); Kennesaw, GA
02/18/2016; 7:00 pm, ESPN3		at Stetson	W 92–82	10–18 (6–6)	Edmunds Center (722); DeLand, FL
02/20/2016; 7:00 pm, ESPN3		at Florida Gulf Coast	L 63–68	10–19 (6–7)	Alico Arena (4,633); Fort Myers, FL
02/25/2016; 7:30 pm, ESPN3		at Lipscomb	W 73–57	11–19 (7–7)	Allen Arena (1,823); Nashville, TN
Atlantic Sun tournament
03/01/2016; 7:05 pm, ESPN3	(5)	at (4) Florida Gulf Coast; Quarterfinals	L 64–74	11–20	Alico Arena (2,752); Fort Myers, FL
*Non-conference game. ^{#}Rankings from AP Poll. (#) Tournament seedings in parentheses. All times are in Eastern Time.
