= 2015–16 USC Upstate Spartans men's basketball team =

American college basketball season

2015–16 USC Upstate Spartans men's basketball
- Conference: Atlantic Sun Conference
- Record: 10–22 (4–10 A-Sun)
- Head coach: Eddie Payne (14th season)
- Assistant coach: Kyle Perry; Kente Hart; Josh Chavis
- Home arena: G. B. Hodge Center

2015–16 Atlantic Sun men's basketball standings
	Conf.				Overall
Team	W		L	PCT	W		L	PCT
North Florida	10	–	4	.714	22	–	12	.647
NJIT	8	–	6	.571	20	–	15	.571
Jacksonville	8	–	6	.571	16	–	16	.500
Florida Gulf Coast †	8	–	6	.571	21	–	14	.600
Kennesaw State	7	–	7	.500	11	–	20	.355
Lipscomb	7	–	7	.500	12	–	21	.364
Stetson*	4	–	10	.286	12	–	22	.353
USC Upstate	4	–	10	.286	10	–	22	.313
† 2016 Atlantic Sun Tournament winner *ineligible for the 2016 NCAA tournament due to APR violations

The 2015–16 USC Upstate Spartans men's basketball team represented the University of South Carolina Upstate during the 2015–16 NCAA Division I men's basketball season. The Spartans, led by 14th year head coach Eddie Payne, played their home games at the G. B. Hodge Center and were members of the Atlantic Sun Conference. They finished the season 10–22, 4–10 in A-Sun play to finish in a tie for 7th place. They lost in the quarterfinals of the A-Sun tournament to North Florida.

== Roster ==
Number	Name	Position	Height	Weight	Year	Hometown
0	Damian Goodwin	Forward	6–7	195	Junior	Atlanta, Georgia
1	Mike Cunningham	Guard	6–1	190	RS Freshman	Washington, D.C.
2	Marvin Smith	Forward	6–6	210	Senior	Memphis, Tennessee
3	Jure Span	Guard	6–4	165	Freshman	Litija, Slovenia
4	Ramel Thompkins	Forward	6–6	195	Sophomore	Vidalia, Georgia
5	Tanner Castora	Guard	6–2	180	Freshman	Strongsville, Ohio
10	Josh Cuthbertson	Forward	6–5	185	Junior	New Bern, North Carolina
11	Deion Holmes	Forward	6–3	180	Freshman	Chesnee, South Carolina
13	Carson Smith	Forward	6–6	200	Junior	Fort Mill, South Carolina
14	Tristan Thomas	Guard	6–3	190	Junior	Bangor, Maine
15	Philip Whittington	Forward	6–8	202	Freshman	Columbus, Georgia
21	Blake Edwards	Guard	6–0	175	Freshman	Chapin, South Carolina
24	Malik Moore	Forward	6–6	188	Freshman	Asheville, North Carolina
33	Jacob Schulte	Forward	6–6	222	Sophomore	Newport, Kentucky
44	Michael Buchanan	Center	6–11	250	Junior	Las Vegas, Nevada

== Schedule ==
Date time, TV	Rank^{#}	Opponent^{#}	Result	Record	Site (attendance) city, state
Non-conference regular season
11/13/2015*; 9:30 pm, SECN+		at Texas A&M	L 64–104	0–1	Reed Arena (6,552); College Station, TX
11/16/2015*; 5:00 pm		at Presbyterian	L 73–74	0–2	Templeton Physical Education Center (509); Clinton, SC
11/19/2015*; 7:30 pm, ESPN3		Navy	L 55–67	0–3	Hodge Center (805); Spartanburg, SC
11/21/2015*; 2:00 pm		Bob Jones; Upstate Challenge	L 79–83	0–4	Hodge Center (567); Spartanburg, SC
11/24/2015*; 7:00 pm, ESPN3		Winthrop	L 78–79	0–5	Hodge Center (571); Spartanburg, SC
11/27/2015*; 5:00 pm, ESPN3		Georgia Southern; Upstate Challenge	L 80–84	0–6	Hodge Center (567); Spartanburg, SC
11/28/2015*; 5:00 pm, ESPN3		The Citadel; Upstate Challenge	L 81–88	0–7	Hodge Center (354); Spartanburg, SC
11/30/2015*; 7:00 pm		Toccoa Falls; Upstate Challenge	W 101–54	1–7	Hodge Center (590); Spartanburg, SC
12/02/2015*; 7:00 pm, ESPN3		at Clemson	L 56–76	1–8	Bon Secours Wellness Arena (5,528); Greenville, SC
12/04/2015*; 7:00 pm		at East Carolina	L 71–82	1–9	Williams Arena at Minges Coliseum (4,464); Greenville, NC
12/11/2015*; 7:00 pm		North Greenville	W 70–58	2–9	Hodge Center (522); Spartanburg, SC
12/14/2015*; 7:00 pm		at Navy	W 66–57	3–9	Alumni Hall (438); Annapolis, MD
12/16/2015*; 8:00 pm		at UAB	L 54–96	3–10	Bartow Arena (3,395); Birmingham, AL
12/21/2015*; 9:00 pm		at Colorado State	L 61–89	3–11	Moby Arena (2,658); Fort Collins, CO
12/30/2015*; 7:00 pm		Lees–McRae	W 88–60	4–11	Hodge Center (388); Spartanburg, SC
01/02/2016*; 2:00 pm, ESPN3		UMKC	W 70–68	5–11	Hodge Center (270); Spartanburg, SC
01/05/2016*; 7:00 pm, ESPN3		North Carolina A&T	W 78–68	6–11	Hodge Center (423); Spartanburg, SC
Atlantic Sun Conference regular season
01/09/2016; 4:00 pm, ESPN3		at NJIT	W 80–78	7–11 (1–0)	Fleisher Center (882); Newark, NJ
01/14/2016; 7:00 pm, ESPN3		at Stetson	L 86–89 ^{OT}	7–12 (1–1)	Edmunds Center (690); DeLand, FL
01/16/2016; 7:00 pm, ESPN3		at Florida Gulf Coast	L 56–85	7–13 (1–2)	Alico Arena (4,074); Fort Myers, FL
01/21/2016; 7:00 pm, ESPN3		North Florida	L 62–78	7–14 (1–3)	Hodge Center (621); Spartanburg, SC
01/23/2016; 2:00 pm, ESPN3		Jacksonville	L 68–77	7–15 (1–4)	Hodge Center (474); Spartanburg, SC
01/27/2016; 7:00 pm, ESPN3		Kennesaw State	L 75–78	7–16 (1–5)	Hodge Center (670); Spartanburg, SC
01/30/2016; 5:00 pm, ESPN3		at Lipscomb	W 92–91 ^{OT}	8–16 (2–5)	Allen Arena (2,374); Nashville, TN
02/01/2016; 7:00 pm, ESPN3		at Kennesaw State	L 62–75	8–17 (2–6)	KSU Convocation Center (1,109); Kennesaw, GA
02/06/2016; 2:00 pm, ESPN3		Lipscomb	L 65–78	8–18 (2–7)	Hodge Center (692); Spartanburg, SC
02/11/2016; 7:00 pm, ESPN3		Florida Gulf Coast	L 64–71	8–19 (2–8)	Hodge Center (345); Spartanburg, SC
02/13/2016; 2:00 pm, ESPN3		Stetson	W 85–83	9–19 (3–8)	Hodge Center (456); Spartanburg, SC
02/18/2016; 7:00 pm, ESPN3		at Jacksonville	L 76–81	9–20 (3–9)	Swisher Gymnasium (628); Jacksonville, FL
02/20/2016; 7:00 pm, ESPN3		at North Florida	L 78–81	9–21 (3–10)	UNF Arena (4,086); Jacksonville, FL
02/25/2016; 7:00 pm		NJIT	W 72–71	10–21 (4–10)	Hodge Center (568); Spartanburg, SC
Atlantic Sun tournament
03/01/2016; 7:30 pm, ESPN3	(8)	at (1) North Florida; Quarterfinals	L 69–92	10–22	UNF Arena (3,317); Jacksonville, FL
*Non-conference game. ^{#}Rankings from AP poll. (#) Tournament seedings in parentheses. All times are in Eastern Time.
