= 2015–16 Atlantic Sun Conference men's basketball season =

- League: NCAA Division I
- Sport: Basketball
- Teams: 8

Regular season
- Champions: North Florida
- Season MVP: Dallas Moore, North Florida

Tournament
- Champions: Florida Gulf Coast
- Runners-up: Stetson
- Finals MVP: Marc-Eddy Norelia, FGCU

Atlantic Sun men's basketball seasons
- 2014–15 2016–17

2015–16 Atlantic Sun men's basketball standings
	Conf.				Overall
Team	W		L	PCT	W		L	PCT
North Florida	10	–	4	.714	22	–	12	.647
NJIT	8	–	6	.571	20	–	15	.571
Jacksonville	8	–	6	.571	16	–	16	.500
Florida Gulf Coast †	8	–	6	.571	21	–	14	.600
Kennesaw State	7	–	7	.500	11	–	20	.355
Lipscomb	7	–	7	.500	12	–	21	.364
Stetson*	4	–	10	.286	12	–	22	.353
USC Upstate	4	–	10	.286	10	–	22	.313
† 2016 Atlantic Sun Tournament winner *ineligible for the 2016 NCAA tournament due to APR violations

The 2015–16 Atlantic Sun Conference men's basketball season was the 38th season of Atlantic Sun Conference basketball.

The defending regular season and tournament champion was North Florida. It was the first season in the A-Sun for NJIT, who replaced Northern Kentucky following their departure for the Horizon League.

North Florida won their second straight regular season championship but were upset by Florida Gulf Coast in the 2016 Atlantic Sun men's basketball tournament semifinals. Florida Gulf Coast defeated Stetson in the Tournament title game to win their second A-Sun Tournament championship and berth in the 2016 NCAA Men's Division I Basketball Tournament.

== Postseason results ==
Team	Postseason tournament	Seed	Round	Opponent	Result
Florida Gulf Coast	NCAA	#16	First Four; First Round	#16 Fairleigh Dickinson #1 North Carolina	W 96–65; L 67–83
North Florida	NIT	#7	First Round	#2 Florida	L 68–97
NJIT	CIT	N/A	First Round; Second Round; Quarterfinals; Semifinals	Army; Boston University; Texas–Arlington; Columbia	W 79–65; W 83–72; W 63–60; L 65–80
