= 2015–16 Stetson Hatters men's basketball team =

American college basketball season

2015–16 Stetson Hatters men's basketball
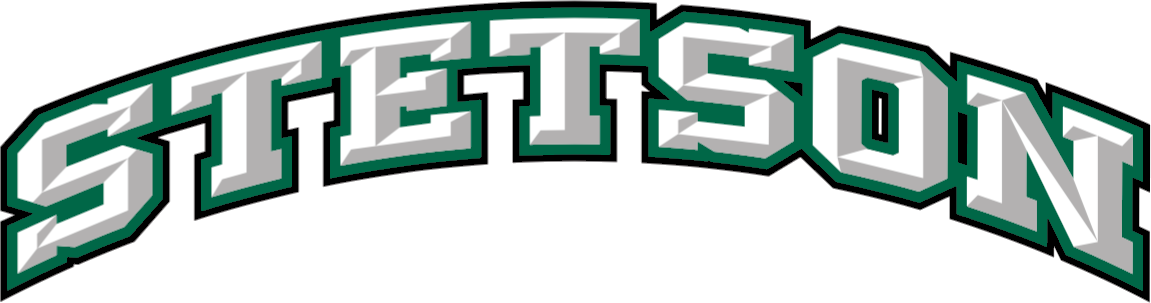
- Conference: Atlantic Sun Conference
- Record: 12–22 (4–10 A-Sun)
- Head coach: Corey Williams (3rd season)
- Assistant coaches: Bert Capel; Kevin Dux; Nikita Johnson
- Home arena: Edmunds Center

2015–16 Atlantic Sun men's basketball standings
| | Conf. | | | | Overall |
| Team | W | | L | PCT | W | | L | PCT |
|---|---|---|---|---|---|---|---|---|
| North Florida | 10 | – | 4 | .714 | 22 | – | 12 | .647 |
| NJIT | 8 | – | 6 | .571 | 20 | – | 15 | .571 |
| Jacksonville | 8 | – | 6 | .571 | 16 | – | 16 | .500 |
| Florida Gulf Coast † | 8 | – | 6 | .571 | 21 | – | 14 | .600 |
| Kennesaw State | 7 | – | 7 | .500 | 11 | – | 20 | .355 |
| Lipscomb | 7 | – | 7 | .500 | 12 | – | 21 | .364 |
| Stetson* | 4 | – | 10 | .286 | 12 | – | 22 | .353 |
| USC Upstate | 4 | – | 10 | .286 | 10 | – | 22 | .313 |
† 2016 Atlantic Sun Tournament winner *ineligible for the 2016 NCAA tournament due to APR violations

The 2015–16 Stetson Hatters men's basketball team represented Stetson University during the 2015–16 NCAA Division I men's basketball season. The Hatters, led by third year head coach Corey Williams, played their home games at the Edmunds Center and were members of the Atlantic Sun Conference.

Due to APR violations, Stetson was ineligible for the NCAA Tournament. Despite having a conference record of 4–10, seventh out of eighth place in the conference, and having no postseason berth to play for, the Hatters made an improbable run to the 2016 Atlantic Sun men's basketball tournament championship game. They came up just short, losing 80–78 in overtime on the road to Florida Gulf Coast to finish the season with a record of 12–22. If Stetson had won, North Florida would have received the conference's automatic NCAA Tournament bid as the regular season champion.

== Roster ==
| Number | Name | Position | Height | Weight | Year | Hometown |
|---|---|---|---|---|---|---|
| 1 | Ty Cockfield | Guard | 6–1 | 175 | Freshman | Gainesville, Georgia |
| 2 | Grant Lozoya | Forward | 6–2 | 180 | Sophomore | Westlake Village, California |
| 3 | B.J. Glasford | Guard | 6–4 | 180 | Junior | Miami, Florida |
| 4 | Divine Myles | Guard | 5–11 | 180 | Sophomore | Mobile, Alabama |
| 13 | Cameron Harvey | Guard | 6–3 | 210 | Junior | Naperville, Illinois |
| 20 | Drew Romich | Forward/Center | 6–9 | 220 | Freshman | Marietta, Georgia |
| 22 | Derick Newton | Forward | 6–7 | 220 | Freshman | Beverly Hills, California |
| 23 | Kevin Ndahiro | Forward/Center | 6–9 | 225 | Freshman | Ottawa, Ontario |
| 33 | Luke Doyle | Guard | 6–5 | 190 | Sophomore | Oviedo, Florida |
| 35 | Leo Goodman | Guard/Forward | 6–5 | 210 | Freshman | Las Vegas, Nevada |
| 41 | Brian Pegg | Guard | 6–7 | 205 | Junior | Clearwater, Florida |

== Schedule ==
| Date time, TV | Rank^{#} | Opponent^{#} | Result | Record | Site (attendance) city, state |
Regular season
| 11/15/2015*; 5:00 pm | | at Richmond; Las Vegas Invitational | L 85–108 | 0–1 | Robins Center (4,735); Richmond, VA |
| 11/17/2015*; 6:00 pm | | at The Citadel | L 93–94 | 0–2 | McAlister Field House (1,042); Charleston, SC |
| 11/20/2015*; 7:00 pm | | at No. 22 West Virginia; Las Vegas Invitational | L 62–103 | 0–3 | WVU Coliseum (8,268); Morgantown, WV |
| 11/23/2015*; 8:00 pm, ESPN3 | | Fort Valley State | W 101–72 | 1–3 | Edmunds Center (731); DeLand, FL |
| 11/26/2015*; 9:00 pm | | vs. Bethune-Cookman; Las Vegas Invitational | W 83–70 | 2–3 | Orleans Arena (3,125); Paradise, NV |
| 11/27/2015*; 5:00 pm | | vs. East Carolina; Las Vegas Invitational | L 73–93 | 2–4 | Orleans Arena; Paradise, NV |
| 11/30/2015*; 7:00 pm | | at FIU | W 81–75 | 3–4 | FIU Arena (820); Miami, FL |
| 12/02/2015*; 8:00 pm | | UCF | L 85–94 | 3–5 | Edmunds Center (2,150); DeLand, FL |
| 12/05/2015*; 3:00 pm | | at Tennessee State | L 54–74 | 3–6 | Gentry Complex (754); Nashville, TN |
| 12/14/2015*; 7:00 pm | | Tennessee State | L 90–93 ^{2OT} | 3–7 | Edmunds Center (695); DeLand, FL |
| 12/16/2015*; 7:00 pm | | Albany State (GA) | W 95–69 | 4–7 | Edmunds Center (694); DeLand, FL |
| 12/19/2015*; 1:00 pm | | at IPFW | L 89–95 | 4–8 | Memorial Coliseum (1,075); Fort Wayne, IN |
| 12/22/2015*; 7:00 pm | | at Georgia Southern | L 58–78 | 4–9 | Hanner Fieldhouse (501); Statesboro, GA |
| 12/30/2015*; 1:00 pm | | Florida Tech | W 93–83 | 5–9 | Edmunds Center (395); DeLand, FL |
| 01/02/2016*; 1:00 pm, ESPN3 | | Webber International | W 103–53 | 6–9 | Edmunds Center (275); DeLand, FL |
| 01/06/2016; 7:00 pm, ESPN3 | | North Florida | L 79–97 | 6–10 (0–1) | Edmunds Center (515); DeLand, FL |
| 01/09/2016; 7:00 pm, ESPN3 | | at Florida Gulf Coast | L 53–82 | 6–11 (0–2) | Alico Arena (4,266); Fort Myers, FL |
| 01/14/2016; 7:00 pm, ESPN3 | | USC Upstate | W 89–86 ^{OT} | 7–11 (1–2) | Edmunds Center (690); DeLand, FL |
| 01/16/2016; 3:30 pm, ESPN3 | | NJIT | L 59–71 | 7–12 (1–3) | Edmunds Center (512); DeLand, FL |
| 01/21/2016; 7:30 pm, ESPN3 | | at Lipscomb | L 87–92 | 7–13 (1–4) | Allen Arena (1,232); Nashville, TN |
| 01/23/2016; 4:30 pm, ESPN3 | | at Kennesaw State | W 84–79 | 8–13 (2–4) | KSU Convocation Center (1,909); Kennesaw, GA |
| 01/27/2016*; 9:00 pm, FS1 | | at Marquette | L 60–74 | 8–14 | BMO Harris Bradley Center (11,756); Milwaukee, WI |
| 01/30/2016; 7:00 pm, ESPN3 | | at Jacksonville | L 60–75 | 8–15 (2–5) | Swisher Gymnasium (877); Jacksonville, FL |
| 02/01/2016; 7:00 pm, ESPN3 | | at North Florida | W 86–82 | 9–15 (3–5) | UNF Arena (2,004); Jacksonville, FL |
| 02/06/2016; 3:30 pm, ESPN3 | | Jacksonville | L 88–96 ^{OT} | 9–16 (3–6) | Edmunds Center (1,013); DeLand, FL |
| 02/11/2016; 7:00 pm, ESPN3 | | at NJIT | L 70–74 | 9–17 (3–7) | Fleisher Center (805); Newark, NJ |
| 02/13/2016; 2:00 pm, ESPN3 | | at USC Upstate | L 83–85 | 9–18 (3–8) | Hodge Center (456); Spartanburg, SC |
| 02/18/2016; 7:00 pm, ESPN3 | | Kennesaw State | L 82–92 | 9–19 (3–9) | Edmunds Center (722); DeLand, FL |
| 02/20/2016; 3:30 pm, ESPN3 | | Lipscomb | L 74–77 | 9–20 (3–10) | Edmunds Center (761); DeLand, FL |
| 02/22/2016*; 8:00 pm, ESPN3 | | Bethune-Cookman | L 94–96 | 9–21 | Edmunds Center (1,269); DeLand, FL |
| 02/25/2016; 7:00 pm | | Florida Gulf Coast | W 80–73 | 10–21 (4–10) | Edmunds Center (842); DeLand, FL |
Atlantic Sun tournament
| 03/01/2016; 7:30 pm, ESPN3 | (7) | at (2) NJIT; Quarterfinals | W 82–67 | 11–21 | Fleisher Center (1,022); Newark, NJ |
| 03/03/2016; 7:00 pm, ESPN3 | (7) | at (6) Lipscomb; Semifinals | W 96–75 | 12–21 | Allen Arena (2,465); Nashville, TN |
| 03/06/2016; 7:00 pm, ESPN2 | (7) | at (4) Florida Gulf Coast; Championship game | L 78–80 ^{OT} | 12–22 | Alico Arena (4,670); Fort Myers, FL |
*Non-conference game. ^{#}Rankings from AP Poll. (#) Tournament seedings in parentheses. All times are in Eastern Time.
