= 2015–16 Florida Gulf Coast Eagles men's basketball team =

American college basketball season

2015–16 Florida Gulf Coast Eagles men's basketball
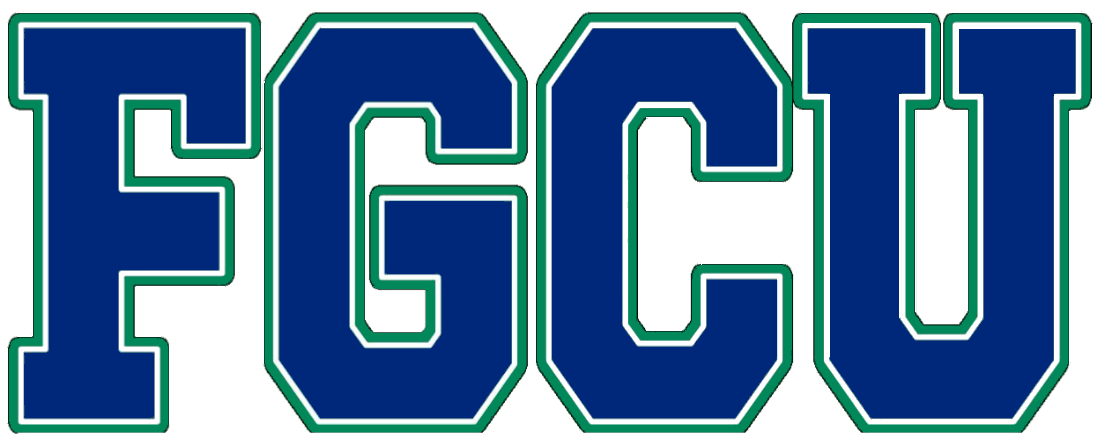

Atlantic Sun tournament champions

NCAA tournament, First round
- Conference: Atlantic Sun Conference
- Record: 21–14 (8–6 A-Sun)
- Head coach: Joe Dooley (3rd season)
- Assistant coaches: Michael Fly (5th season); Tom Abatemarco (1st season); Senque Carey (1st season)
- Home arena: Alico Arena

2015–16 Atlantic Sun men's basketball standings
	Conf.				Overall
Team	W		L	PCT	W		L	PCT
North Florida	10	–	4	.714	22	–	12	.647
NJIT	8	–	6	.571	20	–	15	.571
Jacksonville	8	–	6	.571	16	–	16	.500
Florida Gulf Coast †	8	–	6	.571	21	–	14	.600
Kennesaw State	7	–	7	.500	11	–	20	.355
Lipscomb	7	–	7	.500	12	–	21	.364
Stetson*	4	–	10	.286	12	–	22	.353
USC Upstate	4	–	10	.286	10	–	22	.313
† 2016 Atlantic Sun Tournament winner *ineligible for the 2016 NCAA tournament due to APR violations

The 2015–16 Florida Gulf Coast Eagles men's basketball team represented Florida Gulf Coast University (FGCU) in the 2015–16 NCAA Division I men's basketball season. FGCU was a member of the Atlantic Sun Conference. They played their home games at Alico Arena and were led by third year head coach Joe Dooley. They finished the season 21–14, 8–6 in A-Sun play to finish in a three-way tie for second place. They defeated Kennesaw State, North Florida, and Stetson to be champions of the A-Sun tournament. They received the conference's automatic bid to the NCAA tournament where they defeated Fairleigh Dickinson in the First Four to advance to the first round where they lost to North Carolina.

== Pre-season ==
Departures

Name	Number	Pos.	Height	Weight	Year	Hometown	Notes
Brett Comer	0	G	6'3"	192	Senior	Winter Park, FL	Graduated
Bernard Thompson	2	G	6'3"	166	Senior	Conyers, GA	Graduated
Nate Hicks	1	C	6'10"	227	RS Senior	Panama City Beach, FL	Graduated
Jamail Jones	5	5	6'6"	215	RS Senior	Atlanta, GA	Graduated
Logan Hovey	10	F	6'7"	208	RS Freshman	Orlando, FL	Transferred to Southwest Baptist
Eric Moeller	42	F	6'11"	215	RS Sophomore	Ocala, FL	Retired due to injuries
Marcus Blake	24	F	6'7"	205	RS Senior	Miami, FL	Walk-on; graduated
Armand Shoon	4	G	6'3"	183	Sophomore	Miami, FL	Walk-on; transferred to St. Thomas University
Nick Pellar	11	F	6'6"	206	RS Sophomore	Munster, Indiana	Walk-on; retired
Tejai Allen	23	G	6'4"	193	Sophomore	Jacksonville, FL	Walk-on; transferred to Claflin University

Arrivals

Player	Previous Institution
Kevin Mickle	Broward College
Brandon Goodwin	UCF
Patson Siame	Loyola Marymount

Class of 2015 Signees

College recruiting information
Name	Hometown	School	Height	Weight	Commit date
Rayjon Tucker; SF	Charlotte, NC	Northside Christian	6 ft 5 in (1.96 m)	180 lb (82 kg)	Sep 24, 2014
Rayjon Tucker; SF	Recruit ratings: Scout: Rivals: (78)				
Reggie Reid; PG	Augusta, GA	Harlem (GA)	5 ft 11 in (1.80 m)	175 lb (79 kg)	Nov 24, 2014
Reggie Reid; PG	Recruit ratings: Scout: Rivals:				
Overall recruit ranking:
Note: In many cases, Scout, Rivals, 247Sports, On3, and ESPN may conflict in their listings of height and weight.; In these cases, the average was taken. ESPN grades are on a 100-point scale.; Sources: "2015 Florida Gulf Coast Signees". Rivals.; "2015 Florida Gulf Coast Signees". ESPN.; "2015 Team Ranking". Rivals.

== Roster ==
2015–16 Florida Gulf Coast Eagles men's basketball team
Players
Coaches

Pos.	#	Name	Height	Weight	Year	Previous school	Hometown
G	0	Brandon Goodwin (redshirt)	6 ft 2 in (1.88 m)	180 lb (82 kg)	Jr	Norcross/UCF	Norcross, GA
G	1	Reggie Reid	5 ft 11 in (1.8 m)	162 lb (73 kg)	Fr	Harlem High School	Harlem, GA
G	2	Joshua Ko (W) (redshirt)	6 ft 1 in (1.85 m)	167 lb (76 kg)	Jr	Kalaheo/Pittsburg	Kailua, HI
G	3	Julian DeBose	6 ft 4 in (1.93 m)	197 lb (89 kg)	RS Sr	St. John's College High School/Rice	Washington, D.C.
G	4	Maxx Bleecher (W)	6 ft 2 in (1.88 m)	180 lb (82 kg)	Fr	West Boca Raton	Boca Raton, FL
G	5	Zach Johnson	6 ft 2 in (1.88 m)	195 lb (88 kg)	RS Fr	Miami Norland	Miami, FL
F	10	Kevin Mickle	6 ft 7 in (2.01 m)	220 lb (100 kg)	RS So	Saint Benedict's Prep/Broward College	Brooklyn, NY
G	11	Christian Terrell	6 ft 5 in (1.96 m)	184 lb (83 kg)	So	Providence School	Jacksonville, FL
G	14	Brian Greene Jr.	6 ft 3 in (1.91 m)	210 lb (95 kg)	RS Jr	IMG Academy/Auburn	Chicago, IL
F	15	Filip Cvjeticanin	6 ft 9 in (2.06 m)	218 lb (99 kg)	RS Sr	The American School of Madrid	Zagreb, Croatia
F	21	Demetris Morant	6 ft 9 in (2.06 m)	209 lb (95 kg)	RS Jr	Bishop Gorman/UNLV	Las Vegas, NV
G	22	Alvin Cunningham (W)	6 ft 4 in (1.93 m)	195 lb (88 kg)	Jr	Admiral Farragut Academy/Coastal Bend	St. Petersburg, FL
G	24	Rayjon Tucker	6 ft 5 in (1.96 m)	205 lb (93 kg)	Fr	Northside Christian Academy	Charlotte, NC
F	25	Marc-Eddy Norelia	6 ft 8 in (2.03 m)	218 lb (99 kg)	RS Jr	Olympia High School/Tulane	Orlando, FL
F	32	Antravious Simmons	6 ft 9 in (2.06 m)	250 lb (113 kg)	RS So	South Miami High School/VCU	Miami, FL
G	33	Dolan Mahoney (W)	6 ft 2 in (1.88 m)	185 lb (84 kg)	Fr	IMG Academy	Bradenton, FL
F	41	Patson Siame (redshirt)	6 ft 11 in (2.11 m)	236 lb (107 kg)	Jr	Loyola Marymount	Luanshya, Zambia

Head coach

- Joe Dooley (George Washington)

Assistant coach(es)

- Michael Fly (Kentucky)
- Tom Abatemarco (Dowling)
- Senque Carey (New Mexico)

Legend

- (C) Team captain
- (S) Suspended
- (I) Ineligible
- (W) Walk-on
- Injured
- Current redshirt

Roster
Last update: January 12, 2016

== Schedule ==
Date time, TV	Rank^{#}	Opponent^{#}	Result	Record	High points	High rebounds	High assists	Site (attendance) city, state
Regular season
November 14, 2015*; 2:00 pm		at Ohio	L 75–85	0–1	21 – Norelia	9 – Norelia	5 – Tied	Convocation Center (5,851); Athens, OH
November 16, 2015*; 7:00 pm, ESPN3		Texas Wesleyan	W 85–62	1–1	18 – Cvjeticanin	11 – Norelia	6 – Tied	Alico Arena (3,809); Fort Myers, FL
November 21, 2015*; 7:00 pm, ESPN3		Youngstown State; FGCU Classic	W 104–101 ^{3OT}	2–1	34 – Norelia	18 – Tied	9 – Reid	Alico Arena (3,562); Fort Myers, FL
November 22, 2015*; 7:00 pm, ESPN3		North Dakota; FGCU Classic	W 73–60	3–1	18 – Norelia	10 – Norelia	9 – Reid	Alico Arena (3,412); Fort Myers, FL
November 23, 2015*; 7:00 pm, ESPN3		Bowling Green; FGCU Classic	L 77–82	3–2	26 – Johnson	7 – Norelia	4 – Johnson	Alico Arena (3,854); Fort Myers, FL
November 27, 2015*; 6:30 pm, SECN		at Florida	L 50–70	3–3	9 – Terrell	9 – Terrell	3 – Simmons	O'Connell Center (10,323); Gainesville, FL
November 29, 2015*; 5:00 pm, ESPN3		Ave Maria; FGCU Classic	W 91–34	4–3	24 – Terrell	5 – Mickle	6 – Johnson	Alico Arena (2,460); Fort Myers, FL
December 2, 2015*; 8:00 pm, SECN+		at No. 18 Texas A&M	L 65–75	4–4	14 – Terrell	9 – Morant	3 – Tied	Reed Arena (5,589); College Station, TX
December 6, 2015*; 3:30 pm, ASN		at FIU	W 84–76 ^{OT}	5–4	20 – Terrell	11 – Norelia	6 – Tied	FIU Arena (1,156); University Park, FL
December 13, 2015*; 1:30 pm, ESPN3		UMass	W 77–76	6–4	20 – Norelia	8 – Morant	2 – Tied	Alico Arena (3,049); Fort Myers, FL
December 19, 2015*; 5:00 pm, ESPN3		South Dakota State	L 52–56	6–5	26 – Norelia	11 – Norelia	2 – Tied	Alico Arena (3,247); Fort Myers, FL
December 22, 2015*; 7:00 pm, ESPN3		Louisiana Tech	L 63–66	6–6	16 – Terrell	10 – Morant	4 – Reid	Alico Arena (3,514); Fort Myers, FL
December 28, 2015*; 7:00 pm, ESPN3		vs. South Dakota	L 81–89 ^{OT}	6–7	25 – Terrell	12 – Norelia	3 – Reid	Sanford Pentagon (2,087); Sioux Falls, SD
December 31, 2015*; 1:30 pm, ESPN3		La Salle	W 86–77	7–7	20 – DeBose	10 – Simmons	5 – Johnson	Alico Arena (3,084); Fort Myers, FL
January 2, 2016*; 4:00 pm, ESPN3		Eckerd	W 68–57	8–7	19 – Norelia	6 – Norelia	4 – Tied	Alico Arena (2,983); Fort Myers, FL
January 5, 2016*; 7:00 pm, ESPN3		Webber International	W 104–59	9–7	20 – Norelia	9 – Tied	6 – Reid	Alico Arena (2,713); Fort Myers, FL
Atlantic Sun Conference regular season
January 9, 2016; 7:00 pm, ESPN3		Stetson	W 82–53	10–7 (1–0)	17 – Johnson	7 – Norelia	5 – Johnson	Alico Arena (4,266); Fort Myers, FL
January 14, 2016; 7:00 pm, ESPN3		NJIT	W 82–78 ^{OT}	11–7 (2–0)	18 – Norelia	13 – Norelia	5 – Reid	Alico Arena (4,124); Fort Myers, FL
January 16, 2016; 7:00 pm, ESPN3		USC Upstate	W 85–56	12–7 (3–0)	18 – Tied	7 – Tied	6 – Johnson	Alico Arena (4,074); Fort Myers, FL
January 21, 2016; 7:00 pm, ESPN3		at Kennesaw State	W 79–74	13–7 (4–0)	19 – Tucker	9 – Norelia	2 – Tied	KSU Convocation Center (1,809); Kennesaw, GA
January 24, 2016; 2:00 pm, ESPN3		at Lipscomb	L 75–91	13–8 (4–1)	19 – Norelia	8 – Norelia	2 – Greene	Allen Arena (1,183); Nashville, TN
January 27, 2016; 7:00 pm, ESPN3		Jacksonville	L 69–78	13–9 (4–2)	16 – Tied	11 – Norelia	3 – Reid	Alico Arena, FL (4,014); Fort Myers, FL
January 30, 2016; 7:00 pm, ESPN3		at North Florida	L 76–82	13–10 (4–3)	25 – Norelia	9 – Simmons	4 – Tied	UNF Arena (4,138); Jacksonville, FL
February 1, 2016; 7:00 pm, ESPN3		at Jacksonville	L 80–83	13–11 (4–4)	25 – Johnson	7 – Tied	5 – Johnson	Swisher Gymnasium (778); Jacksonville, FL
February 6, 2016; 6:00 pm, ESPN3		North Florida	W 81–65	14–11 (5–4)	16 – DeBose	11 – Norelia	6 – Johnson	Alico Arena (4,522); Fort Myers, FL
February 11, 2016; 7:00 pm, ESPN3		at USC Upstate	W 71–64	15–11 (6–4)	22 – Norelia	9 – Norelia	4 – DeBose	G. B. Hodge Center (345); Spartanburg, SC
February 13, 2016; 4:00 pm, ESPN3		at NJIT	L 59–68	15–12 (6–5)	17 – Norelia	11 – Norelia	2 – Tied	Fleisher Center (1,203); Newark, NJ
February 18, 2016; 7:00 pm, ESPN3		Lipscomb	W 82–67	16–12 (7–5)	25 – Norelia	12 – Norelia	7 – Johnson	Alico Arena (4,271); Fort Myers, FL
February 20, 2016; 7:00 pm, ESPN3		Kennesaw State	W 68–63	17–12 (8–5)	22 – Norelia	7 – Norelia	5 – Johnson	Alico Arena (4,633); Fort Myers, FL
February 25, 2016; 7:00 pm, ESPN3		at Stetson	L 73–80	17–13 (8–6)	29 – Norelia	12 – Norelia	4 – Norelia	Edmunds Center (842); DeLand, FL
Atlantic Sun tournament
March 1, 2016; 7:05 pm, ESPN3	(4)	(5) Kennesaw State; Quarterfinal	W 74–64	18–13	15 – Terrell	12 – Norelia	3 – Tied	Alico Arena (2,752); Fort Myers, FL
March 3, 2016; 7:30 pm, ESPN3	(4)	at (1) North Florida; Semifinal	W 89–56	19–13	23 – Norelia	13 – Norelia	4 – Terrell	UNF Arena (4,305); Jacksonville, FL
March 6, 2016; 7:00 pm, ESPN2	(4)	(7) Stetson; Championship	W 80–78 ^{OT}	20–13	21 – Simmons	12 – Simmons	5 – Tied	Alico Arena (4,670); Fort Myers, FL
NCAA tournament
March 15, 2016*; 6:30 pm, truTV	(16 E)	vs. (16 E) Fairleigh Dickinson; First Four	W 96–65	21–13	20 – Norelia	10 – Tied	7 – Johnson	UD Arena (11,728); Dayton, OH
March 17, 2016*; 7:20 pm, TBS	(16 E)	vs. (1 E) No. 3 North Carolina; First round	L 67–83	21–14	15 – Terrell	11 – Norelia	7 – Terrell	PNC Arena (17,387); Raleigh, NC
*Non-conference game. ^{#}Rankings from AP Poll. (#) Tournament seedings in parentheses. E=East Region. All times are in Eastern Time.
