= 2016 Atlantic Sun men's basketball tournament =

- Classification: Division I
- Season: 2015–16
- Teams: 8
- Site: campus sites
- Champions: Florida Gulf Coast (2nd title)
- Winning coach: Joe Dooley (1st title)
- MVP: Marc-Eddy Norelia (Florida Gulf Coast)
- Attendance: 19,278

2015–16 Atlantic Sun men's basketball standings
	Conf.				Overall
Team	W		L	PCT	W		L	PCT
North Florida	10	–	4	.714	22	–	12	.647
NJIT	8	–	6	.571	20	–	15	.571
Jacksonville	8	–	6	.571	16	–	16	.500
Florida Gulf Coast †	8	–	6	.571	21	–	14	.600
Kennesaw State	7	–	7	.500	11	–	20	.355
Lipscomb	7	–	7	.500	12	–	21	.364
Stetson*	4	–	10	.286	12	–	22	.353
USC Upstate	4	–	10	.286	10	–	22	.313
† 2016 Atlantic Sun Tournament winner *ineligible for the 2016 NCAA tournament due to APR violations

The 2016 Atlantic Sun men's basketball tournament marked the 37th year the league now known as the ASUN Conference conducted a postseason tournament. The tournament was held March 1–6, 2016 at campus sites as top seeds hosted each round. Florida Gulf Coast won their second Atlantic Sun Tournament title and a berth in the 2016 NCAA tournament.

== Seeds ==
All 8 teams in the conference participated in the Tournament.

Stetson was ineligible to participate in the NCAA Tournament due to APR violations, but was allowed to participate in the Atlantic Sun Tournament. Had Stetson won the tournament, North Florida would have gone to the NCAA Tournament because of its regular season Atlantic Sun Conference title.

Teams were seeded by record within the conference, with a tiebreaker system to seed teams with identical conference records.

Seed	School	Conference	Tiebreaker
1	North Florida	10–4	
2	NJIT	8–6	2–0 vs. Jacksonville, 1–1 vs. FGCU
3	Jacksonville	8–6	0–2 vs. NJIT, 2–0 vs. FGCU
4	Florida Gulf Coast	8–6	1–1 vs. NJIT, 0–2 vs. Jacksonville
5	Kennesaw State	7–7	2–0 vs. Lipscomb
6	Lipscomb	7–7	0–2 vs. Kennesaw State
7	Stetson	4–10	1–1 vs. USC Upstate, 1–1 vs. North Florida
8	USC Upstate	4–10	1–1 vs. Stetson, 0–2 vs. North Florida

== Schedule ==
Time	Matchup	Final score	Television	Attendance
Quarterfinals – Tuesday, March 1
7:30 pm	#8 USC Upstate at #1 North Florida	69–92	WatchESPN	3,317
7:05 pm	#5 Kennesaw State at #4 Florida Gulf Coast	64–74	WatchESPN	2,752
7:00 pm	#6 Lipscomb at #3 Jacksonville	92–89^{OT}	WatchESPN	747
7:30 pm	#7 Stetson at #2 NJIT	82–67	WatchESPN	1,022
Semifinals – Thursday, March 3
7:00 pm	#7 Stetson at #6 Lipscomb	96–75	WatchESPN	2,465
7:30 pm	#4 Florida Gulf Coast at #1 North Florida	89–56	WatchESPN	4,305
Final – Sunday, March 6
7:00 pm	#7 Stetson at #4 Florida Gulf Coast	78–80^{OT}	ESPN2	4,670
*Game times in ET. #-Tournament seed

== Bracket ==
Quarterfinals; March 1 WatchESPN
1	North Florida	92
8	USC Upstate	69
4	Florida Gulf Coast	74
5	Kennesaw State	64
3	Jacksonville	89^{OT}
6	Lipscomb	92
2	NJIT	67
7	Stetson	82

Semifinals; March 3 WatchESPN
1	North Florida	56
4	Florida Gulf Coast	89
6	Lipscomb	75
7	Stetson	96

Championship; March 6 ESPN2
4	Florida Gulf Coast	80
7	Stetson	78^{OT}

== See also ==
- 2015–16 NCAA Division I men's basketball season
- Atlantic Sun men's basketball tournament
