= Jordan Woodard =

American basketball player (born 1995)

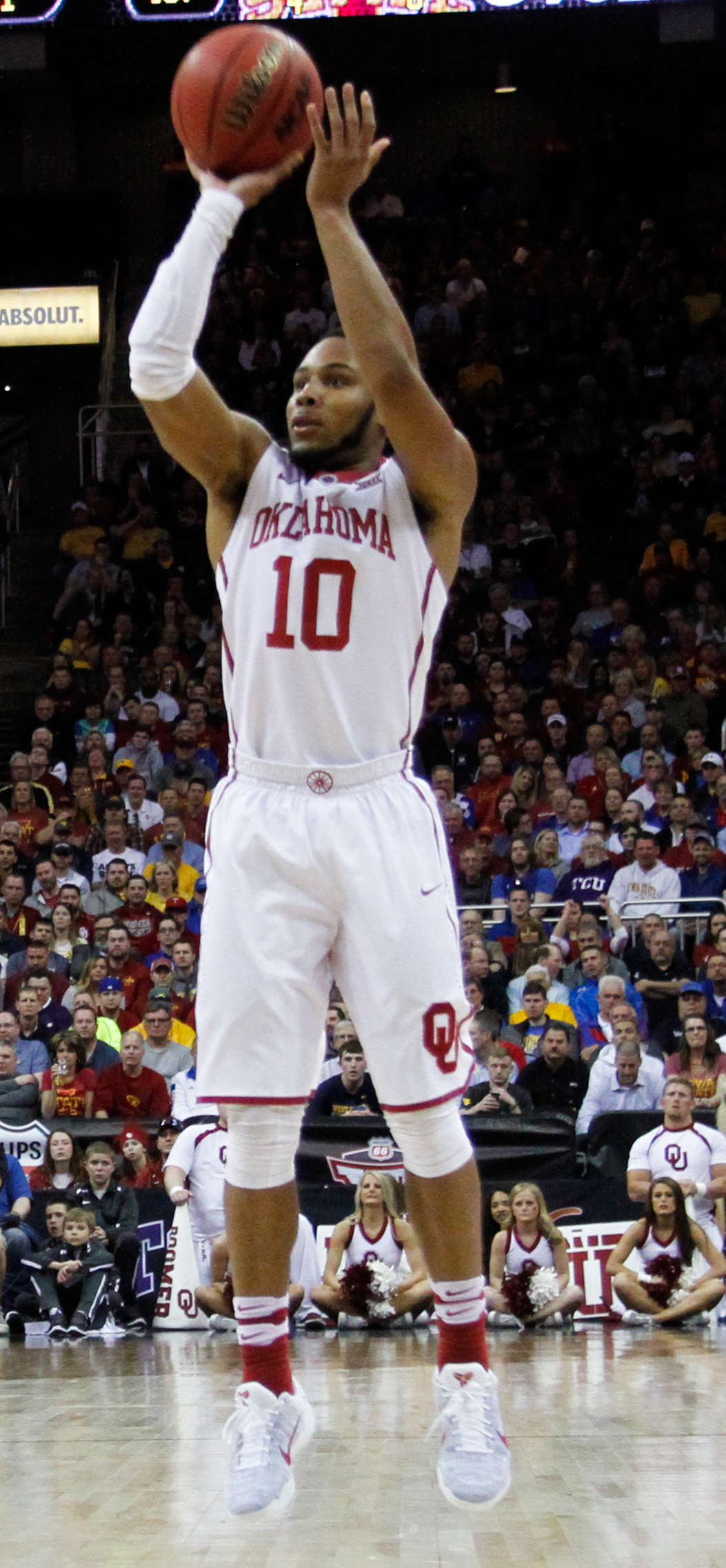
- Woodard shooting for Oklahoma

Legia Warsaw
- Position: Point guard
- League: PLK

Personal information
- Born: November 24, 1995 (age 30) Arcadia, Oklahoma, U.S.
- Listed height: 6 ft 0 in (1.83 m)
- Listed weight: 187 lb (85 kg)

Career information
- High school: Edmond Memorial (Edmond, Oklahoma)
- College: Oklahoma (2013–2017)
- NBA draft: 2017: undrafted
- Playing career: 2018–present

Career history
- 2018–present: Legia Warsaw

Jordan Woodard (born November 24, 1995) is an American professional basketball player for Legia Warsaw of the Polish Basketball League. He played college basketball at Oklahoma from 2013 to 2017.

== College career ==
Woodard had a productive freshman season for Oklahoma, averaging 10.3 points, 2.1 rebounds, and 4.7 assists per game. As a sophomore, Woodard averaged 9.3 points and 3.8 rebounds per game as the Sooners reached the Sweet 16. Woodard was a part of the Oklahoma team that reached the 2016 Final Four as a junior. He contributed 13.0 points, 3.0 rebounds, 3.4 assists, and 1.6 steals per game in a supporting role to Buddy Hield. He was voted an All-Big 12 honorable mention by league coaches as a junior. Coming into his senior year, he was a preseason All-Big 12 honorable mention. As a senior, Woodard averaged 14.6 points, 4.6 rebounds and 3.1 assists per game. His season was cut short when he tore his anterior cruciate ligament in a game against Iowa State on February 11, 2017. In his career, Woodard finished fourth at Oklahoma all-time in assists (471), fifth in made free throws (440), seventh in steals (186), eighth in free throw percentage (81.2%), eighth in total minutes played (3,735) and 14th in points (1,440).

== Professional career ==
In October 2017, Woodard was selected in the third round by the Texas Legends in the NBA G League draft. Woodard was acquired by the Iowa Wolves of the G League on February 19, 2018. However, he did not play for them. On August 29, 2018, Woodard signed with Legia Warsaw of the Polish Basketball League.

== Personal life ==
He is the son of Marcus and Petra Woodard. His brother James played basketball for Tulsa and professionally for MZT Skopje.
