= 2016 NCAA Division I men's basketball tournament =

Edition of USA college basketball tournament

- Season: 2015–16
- Teams: 68
- Finals site: NRG Stadium, Houston, Texas
- Champions: Villanova Wildcats (2nd title, 3rd title game, 5th Final Four)
- Runner-up: North Carolina Tar Heels (10th title game, 19th Final Four)
- Semifinalists: Oklahoma Sooners (5th Final Four); Syracuse Orange (6th Final Four)
- Winning coach: Jay Wright (1st title)
- MOP: Ryan Arcidiacono (Villanova)
- Top scorer: Buddy Hield (Oklahoma) (126 points)

The 2016 NCAA Division I men's basketball tournament involved 68 teams playing in a single-elimination tournament to determine the men's National Collegiate Athletic Association (NCAA) Division I college basketball national champion for the 2015–16 season. The 78th edition of the Tournament began on March 15, 2016, and concluded with the championship game on April 4, at NRG Stadium in Houston, Texas. This was the first NCAA tournament to adopt the NCAA March Madness branding, including fully-branded courts at each of the tournament venues.

Upsets were the story of the first round of the Tournament; No. 15 seed Middle Tennessee upset No. 2 seed Michigan State in the biggest upset, just the eighth ever win for a No. 15 seed over a No. 2. At least one team seeded #9 through #15 won a first-round game for the third time ever and the first time since 2013.

The Final Four consisted of Villanova (first appearance since 2009), Oklahoma (first appearance since 2002), North Carolina (first appearance since their 2009 national championship), and Syracuse (the "Cinderella team" of the tournament, and also the first 10 seed to reach the Final Four). Villanova defeated North Carolina in the championship game 77–74, on a three-point buzzer beater by Kris Jenkins. Pundits called the game one of the best in tournament history, going on to say this was one of the most competitive finals ever.

== Schedule and venues ==
2016 First Four (orange) and First and Second rounds March 17 and 19 (green) March 18 and 20 (blue)
2016 Regionals (blue) and Final Four (red)

Previously, the round of 64 was known as the second round since the 2011 edition, but it was reverted to the moniker first round for this coming tournament. The first four was previously named the first round.

First four

- March 15 and 16
  - University of Dayton Arena, Dayton, Ohio (Host: University of Dayton)

First and second rounds

- March 17 and 19
  - Dunkin' Donuts Center, Providence, Rhode Island (Host: Providence College)
  - Wells Fargo Arena, Des Moines, Iowa, (Host: Iowa State University)
  - PNC Arena, Raleigh, North Carolina, (Host: North Carolina State University)
  - Pepsi Center, Denver, Colorado, (Host: Mountain West Conference)
- March 18 and 20
  - Barclays Center, Brooklyn, New York, (Host: Atlantic 10 Conference)
  - Scottrade Center, St. Louis, Missouri, (Host: Missouri Valley Conference)
  - Chesapeake Energy Arena, Oklahoma City, Oklahoma, (Host: Big 12 Conference)
  - Spokane Veterans Memorial Arena, Spokane, Washington, (Host: University of Idaho)

Regional semifinals and finals (Sweet Sixteen and Elite Eight)

- March 24 and 26
  - South Regional, KFC Yum! Center, Louisville, Kentucky, (Host: University of Louisville)
  - West Regional, Honda Center, Anaheim, California, (Host: Big West Conference)
- March 25 and 27
  - East Regional, Wells Fargo Center, Philadelphia, Pennsylvania, (Host: La Salle University)
  - Midwest Regional, United Center, Chicago, (Host: Big Ten Conference)

National semifinals and championship (Final Four and championship)

- April 2 and 4
  - NRG Stadium, Houston, Texas (Hosts: Rice University, Texas Southern University, University of Houston)

== Qualifying and selection procedure ==
Out of 336 eligible Division I teams, 68 participate in the tournament. Of the total, 15 Division I teams were ineligible due to failing to meet APR requirements, self-imposed postseason bans, or reclassification from a lower division.

Of the 32 automatic bids, 31 were given to programs that won their conference tournaments. For the final time, the Ivy League awarded its NCAA Tournament bid to the team with the best regular-season record and did not hold a tournament (unless playoffs games were needed to resolve tied champions). The Ivy League will hold a postseason tournament for the first time after the 2016–17 Ivy League season. The remaining 36 bids were granted on an "at-large" basis, which were extended by the NCAA Selection Committee to the teams it deems to be the best 36 teams that did not receive automatic bids.

Eight teams—the four lowest-seeded automatic qualifiers and the four lowest-seeded at-large teams—played in the First Four (the successor to what had been popularly known as "play-in games" through the 2010 tournament). The winners of these games advanced to the first round (round of 64). The Selection Committee also seeded the entire field from 1 to 68.

=== Automatic qualifiers ===
The following teams were automatic qualifiers for the 2016 NCAA field by virtue of winning their conference's automatic bid:

Conference	Team	Appearance	Last bid
ACC	North Carolina	47th	2015
America East	Stony Brook	1st	Never
Atlantic 10	Saint Joseph's	21st	2014
American	UConn	33rd	2014
Atlantic Sun	Florida Gulf Coast	2nd	2013
Big 12	Kansas	45th	2015
Big East	Seton Hall	10th	2006
Big Sky	Weber State	16th	2014
Big South	UNC Asheville	4th	2012
Big Ten	Michigan State	30th	2015
Big West	Hawaii	5th	2002
CAA	UNC Wilmington	5th	2006
C-USA	Middle Tennessee	8th	2013
Horizon	Green Bay	5th	1996
Ivy League	Yale	4th	1962
MAAC	Iona	11th	2013
MAC	Buffalo	2nd	2015
MEAC	Hampton	6th	2015
Missouri Valley	Northern Iowa	8th	2015
Mountain West	Fresno State	6th	2001
NEC	Fairleigh Dickinson	5th	2005
Ohio Valley	Austin Peay	6th	2008
Pac-12	Oregon	14th	2015
Patriot	Holy Cross	13th	2007
SEC	Kentucky	56th	2015
Southern	Chattanooga	11th	2009
Southland	Stephen F. Austin	4th	2015
SWAC	Southern	9th	2013
Summit League	South Dakota State	3rd	2013
Sun Belt	Little Rock	5th	2011
WCC	Gonzaga	19th	2015
WAC	Cal State Bakersfield	1st	Never

=== Tournament seeds ===
South Regional – KFC Yum! Center, Louisville, Kentucky
Seed	School	Conference	Record	Overall Seed	Berth type	Last bid
1	Kansas	Big 12	30–4	1	Auto	2015
2	Villanova	Big East	29–5	7	At-large	2015
3	Miami (FL)	ACC	25–7	10	At-large	2013
4	California	Pac-12	23–10	14	At-large	2013
5	Maryland	Big Ten	25–8	19	At-large	2015
6	Arizona	Pac-12	25–8	23	At-large	2015
7	Iowa	Big Ten	21–10	27	At-large	2015
8	Colorado	Pac-12	22–11	30	At-large	2014
9	UConn	American	24–10	36	Auto	2014
10	Temple	American	21–11	38	At-large	2013
11*	Vanderbilt	SEC	19–13	41	At-large	2012
11*	Wichita State	Missouri Valley	24–8	43	At-large	2015
12	South Dakota State	Summit League	26–7	50	Auto	2013
13	Hawaii	Big West	27–5	52	Auto	2002
14	Buffalo	MAC	20–14	56	Auto	2015
15	UNC Asheville	Big South	22–11	61	Auto	2012
16	Austin Peay	Ohio Valley	18–17	63	Auto	2008

East Regional – Wells Fargo Center, Philadelphia, Pennsylvania
Seed	School	Conference	Record	Overall Seed	Berth type	Last bid
1	North Carolina	ACC	28–6	2	Auto	2015
2	Xavier	Big East	27–5	8	At-large	2015
3	West Virginia	Big 12	26–8	9	At-large	2015
4	Kentucky	SEC	26–8	15	Auto	2015
5	Indiana	Big Ten	25–7	17	At-large	2015
6	Notre Dame	ACC	21–11	22	At-large	2015
7	Wisconsin	Big Ten	20–12	25	At-large	2015
8	USC	Pac-12	21–12	31	At-large	2011
9	Providence	Big East	23–10	33	At-large	2015
10	Pittsburgh	ACC	21–11	37	At-large	2014
11*	Michigan	Big Ten	22–12	42	At-large	2014
11*	Tulsa	American	20–11	45	At-large	2014
12	Chattanooga	Southern	29–5	47	Auto	2009
13	Stony Brook	America East	26–6	53	Auto	Never
14	Stephen F. Austin	Southland	27–5	58	Auto	2015
15	Weber State	Big Sky	26–8	62	Auto	2014
16*	Florida Gulf Coast	Atlantic Sun	20–13	65	Auto	2013
16*	Fairleigh Dickinson	NEC	18–14	66	Auto	2005

West Regional – Honda Center, Anaheim, California
Seed	School	Conference	Record	Overall Seed	Berth type	Last bid
1	Oregon	Pac-12	28–6	4	Auto	2015
2	Oklahoma	Big 12	25–7	6	At-large	2015
3	Texas A&M	SEC	26–8	12	At-large	2011
4	Duke	ACC	23–10	13	At-large	2015
5	Baylor	Big 12	22–11	20	At-large	2015
6	Texas	Big 12	20–12	21	At-large	2015
7	Oregon State	Pac-12	19–12	28	At-large	1990
8	Saint Joseph's	Atlantic 10	27–7	32	Auto	2014
9	Cincinnati	American	22–10	35	At-large	2015
10	VCU	Atlantic 10	24–10	40	At-large	2015
11	Northern Iowa	Missouri Valley	22–12	46	Auto	2015
12	Yale	Ivy League	22–6	49	Auto	1962
13	UNC Wilmington	CAA	25–7	51	Auto	2006
14	Green Bay	Horizon	23–12	55	Auto	1996
15	Cal State Bakersfield	WAC	24–8	60	Auto	Never
16*	Holy Cross	Patriot	14–19	68	Auto	2007
16*	Southern	SWAC	22–12	67	Auto	2013

Midwest Regional – United Center, Chicago, Illinois
Seed	School	Conference	Record	Overall Seed	Berth type	Last bid
1	Virginia	ACC	26–7	3	At-large	2015
2	Michigan State	Big Ten	29–5	5	Auto	2015
3	Utah	Pac-12	26–8	11	At-large	2015
4	Iowa State	Big 12	21–11	16	At-large	2015
5	Purdue	Big Ten	26–8	18	At-large	2015
6	Seton Hall	Big East	25–8	24	Auto	2006
7	Dayton	Atlantic 10	25–7	26	At-large	2015
8	Texas Tech	Big 12	19–12	29	At-large	2007
9	Butler	Big East	21–10	34	At-large	2015
10	Syracuse	ACC	19–13	39	At-large	2014
11	Gonzaga	WCC	26–7	44	Auto	2015
12	Little Rock	Sun Belt	29–4	48	Auto	2011
13	Iona	MAAC	22–10	54	Auto	2013
14	Fresno State	Mountain West	25–9	57	Auto	2001
15	Middle Tennessee	C-USA	24–9	59	Auto	2013
16	Hampton	MEAC	21–10	64	Auto	2015

*See First Four

== Bracket ==
All times are listed as Eastern Daylight Time (UTC−4)

=== First Four – Dayton, Ohio ===
The First Four games involved eight teams: the four overall lowest-ranked teams, and the four lowest-ranked at-large teams.

March 15 – South Region
11	Vanderbilt	50
11	Wichita State	70

March 15 – East Region
16	Florida Gulf Coast	96
16	Fairleigh Dickinson	65

March 16 – East Region
11	Michigan	67
11	Tulsa	62

March 16 – West Region
16	Holy Cross	59
16	Southern	55

=== South Regional – Louisville, Kentucky ===
First round Round of 64; March 17–18
1	Kansas	105
16	Austin Peay	79
Des Moines – Thu/Sat
8	Colorado	67
9	UConn	74
5	Maryland	79
12	South Dakota State	74
Spokane – Fri/Sun
4	California	66
13	Hawaii	77
6	Arizona	55
11	Wichita State	65
Providence – Thu/Sat
3	Miami (FL)	79
14	Buffalo	72
7	Iowa	72^{OT}
10	Temple	70
Brooklyn – Fri/Sun
2	Villanova	86
15	UNC Asheville	56

Second Round; Round of 32; March 19–20
1	Kansas	73
9	UConn	61
5	Maryland	73
13	Hawaii	60
11	Wichita State	57
3	Miami (FL)	65
7	Iowa	68
2	Villanova	87

Regional semifinals Sweet 16; March 24
1	Kansas	79
5	Maryland	63
3	Miami (FL)	69
2	Villanova	92

Regional Final; Elite 8 March 26
1	Kansas	59
2	Villanova	64

==== South Regional Final ====
CBS

Saturday, March 26
8:49 pm EDT

Box Score

#2 Villanova Wildcats 64, #1 Kansas Jayhawks 59
Scoring by half: 32–25, 32–34
Pts: R. Arcidiacono, J. Hart, K. Jenkins – 13; Rebs: D. Ochefu – 8 Asts: K. Jenkins – 3	Pts: D. Graham – 17; Rebs: L. Lucas – 12; Asts: F. Mason III – 4

KFC Yum! Center – Louisville, KY
Attendance: 19,422
Referees: Jeff Clark, Terry Wymer, Chris Rastatter

==== South Regional all tournament team ====
- Kris Jenkins (Jr, Villanova) – South Regional most outstanding player
- Ryan Arcidiacono (Sr, Villanova)
- Josh Hart (Jr, Villanova)
- Daniel Ochefu (Sr, Villanova)
- Devonte' Graham (So, Kansas)

=== West Regional – Anaheim, California ===
First round Round of 64; March 17–18
1	Oregon	91
16	Holy Cross	52
Spokane – Fri/Sun
8	Saint Joseph's	78
9	Cincinnati	76
5	Baylor	75
12	Yale	79
Providence – Thu/Sat
4	Duke	93
13	UNC Wilmington	85
6	Texas	72
11	Northern Iowa	75
Oklahoma City – Fri/Sun
3	Texas A&M	92
14	Green Bay	65
7	Oregon State	67
10	VCU	75
Oklahoma City – Fri/Sun
2	Oklahoma	82
15	Cal State Bakersfield	68

Second Round; Round of 32; March 19–20
1	Oregon	69
8	Saint Joseph's	64
12	Yale	64
4	Duke	71
11	Northern Iowa	88
3	Texas A&M	92^{2OT}
10	VCU	81
2	Oklahoma	85

Regional semifinals Sweet 16; March 24
1	Oregon	82
4	Duke	68
3	Texas A&M	63
2	Oklahoma	77

Regional Final; Elite 8 March 26
1	Oregon	68
2	Oklahoma	80

==== West Regional Final ====
CBS

Saturday, March 26
3:09 pm PDT

Box Score

#2 Oklahoma Sooners 80, #1 Oregon Ducks 68
Scoring by half: 48–30, 32–38
Pts: B. Hield – 37; Rebs: C. James – 10; Asts: I. Cousins – 7	Pts: E. Cook – 24; Rebs: J. Bell – 12; Asts: D. Brooks, E. Cook – 4

Honda Center – Anaheim, CA
Attendance: 16,232
Referees: Tony Padilla, Mike Eades, Ray Natili

==== West Regional all tournament team ====
- Buddy Hield (Sr, Oklahoma) – West Regional most outstanding player
- Isaiah Cousins (Sr, Oklahoma)
- Jordan Woodard (Jr, Oklahoma)
- Elgin Cook (Sr, Oregon)
- Brandon Ingram (Fr, Duke)

=== East Regional – Philadelphia, Pennsylvania ===
First round Round of 64; March 17–18
1	North Carolina	83
16	Florida Gulf Coast	67
Raleigh – Thu/Sat
8	USC	69
9	Providence	70
5	Indiana	99
12	Chattanooga	74
Des Moines – Thu/Sat
4	Kentucky	85
13	Stony Brook	57
6	Notre Dame	70
11	Michigan	63
Brooklyn – Fri/Sun
3	West Virginia	56
14	Stephen F. Austin	70
7	Wisconsin	47
10	Pittsburgh	43
St. Louis – Fri/Sun
2	Xavier	71
15	Weber State	53

Second Round; Round of 32; March 19–20
1	North Carolina	85
9	Providence	66
5	Indiana	73
4	Kentucky	67
6	Notre Dame	76
14	Stephen F. Austin	75
7	Wisconsin	66
2	Xavier	63

Regional semifinals Sweet 16; March 25
1	North Carolina	101
5	Indiana	86
6	Notre Dame	61
7	Wisconsin	56

Regional Final; Elite 8 March 27
1	North Carolina	88
6	Notre Dame	74

==== East Regional Final ====
TBS

Sunday, March 27
8:49 pm EDT

Box Score

#6 Notre Dame Fighting Irish 74, #1 North Carolina Tar Heels 88
Scoring by half: 38–43, 36–45
Pts: D. Jackson – 26; Rebs: B. Colson – 5 Asts: D. Jackson – 4	Pts: B. Johnson – 25; Rebs: B. Johnson – 12; Asts: J. Berry II – 8

Wells Fargo Center – Philadelphia, PA
Attendance: 20,743
Referees: Tom Eades, Ed Corbett, Michael Stephens

==== East Regional all tournament team ====
- Brice Johnson (Sr, North Carolina) – East Regional most outstanding player
- Marcus Paige (Sr, North Carolina)
- V. J. Beachem (Jr, Notre Dame)
- Demetrius Jackson (Jr, Notre Dame)
- Yogi Ferrell (Sr, Indiana)

=== Midwest Regional – Chicago, Illinois ===
First round Round of 64; March 17–18
1	Virginia	81
16	Hampton	45
Raleigh – Thu/Sat
8	Texas Tech	61
9	Butler	71
5	Purdue	83
12	Little Rock	85^{2OT}
Denver – Thu/Sat
4	Iowa State	94
13	Iona	81
6	Seton Hall	52
11	Gonzaga	68
Denver – Thu/Sat
3	Utah	80
14	Fresno State	69
7	Dayton	51
10	Syracuse	70
St. Louis – Fri/Sun
2	Michigan State	81
15	Middle Tennessee	90

Second Round; Round of 32; March 19–20
1	Virginia	77
9	Butler	69
12	Little Rock	61
4	Iowa State	78
11	Gonzaga	82
3	Utah	59
10	Syracuse	75
15	Middle Tennessee	50

Regional semifinals Sweet 16; March 25
1	Virginia	84
4	Iowa State	71
11	Gonzaga	60
10	Syracuse	63

Regional Final; Elite 8 March 27
1	Virginia	62
10	Syracuse	68

==== Midwest Regional Final ====
TBS

Sunday, March 27
5:09 pm CDT

Box Score

#10 Syracuse Orange 68, #1 Virginia Cavaliers 62
Scoring by half: 21–35, 47–27
Pts: M. Richardson – 23; Rebs: T. Roberson – 8 Asts: M. Gbinije – 6	Pts: L. Perrantes – 18; Rebs: M. Brogdon – 7 Asts: M. Brogdon – 7

United Center – Chicago, IL
Attendance: 20,155
Referees: Mike Roberts, John Higgens, John Gaffney

==== Midwest Regional all tournament team ====
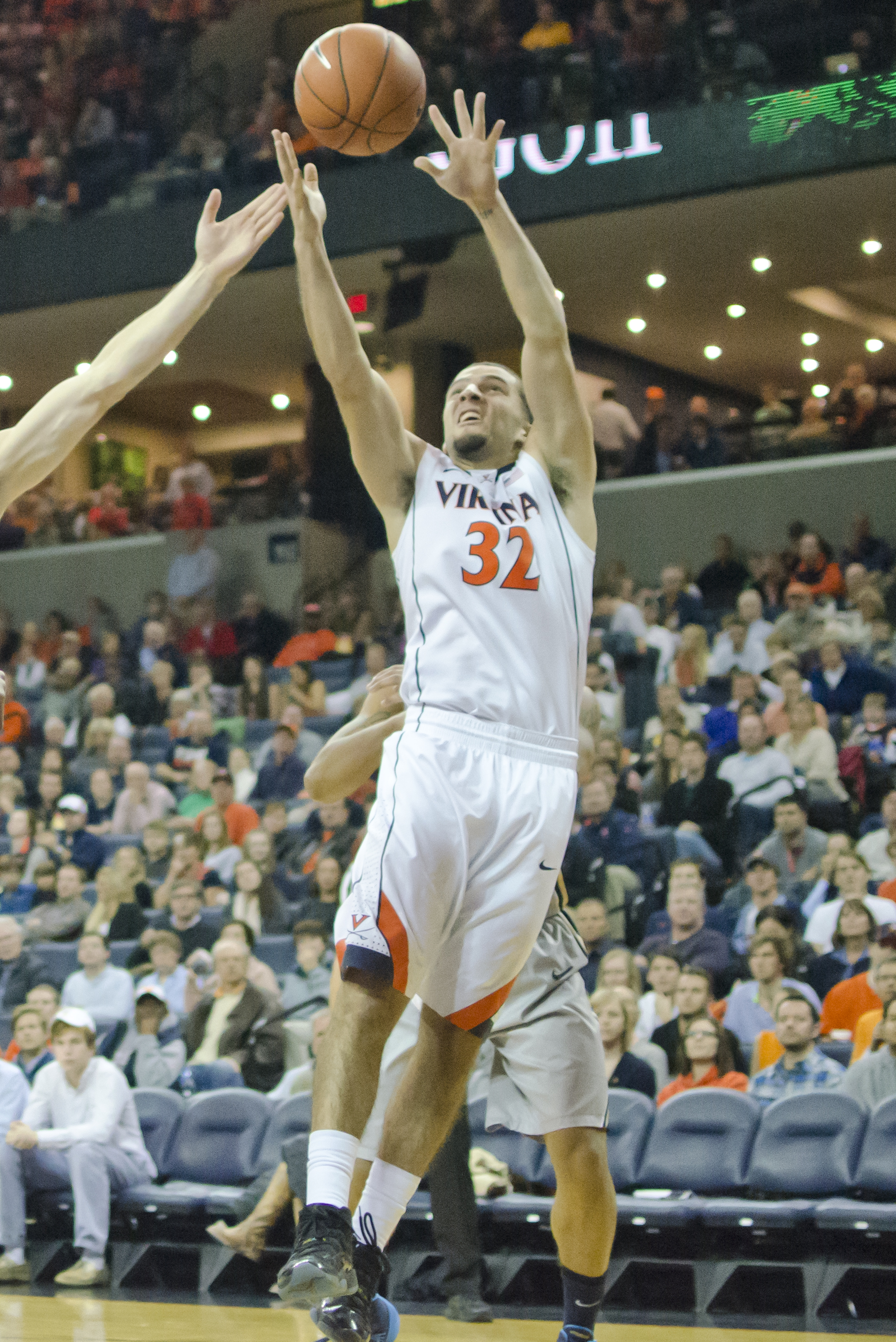
London Perrantes

- Malachi Richardson (Fr, Syracuse) – Midwest Regional most outstanding player
- Michael Gbinije (Sr, Syracuse)
- London Perrantes (Jr, Virginia)
- Georges Niang (Sr, Iowa State)
- Domantas Sabonis (So, Gonzaga)

== Final Four ==
During the Final Four round, regardless of the seeds of the participating teams, the champion of the top overall top seed's region (Kansas's South Region) plays against the champion of the fourth-ranked top seed's region (Oregon's West Region), and the champion of the second overall top seed's region (North Carolina's East Region) plays against the champion of the third-ranked top seed's region (Virginia's Midwest Region).

=== Final Four - NRG Stadium, Houston, Texas ===
National Semifinals; Final Four; Saturday, April 2
S2	Villanova	95
W2	Oklahoma	51
E1	North Carolina	83
MW10	Syracuse	66

National Championship Game; Monday, April 4
S2	Villanova	77
E1	North Carolina	74

==== Final Four ====
TBS

Saturday, April 2
5:09 pm CDT

Box Score

#2 Villanova Wildcats 95, #2 Oklahoma Sooners 51
Scoring by half: 42–28, 53–23
Pts: J. Hart – 23; Rebs: K. Jenkins, J. Hart – 8 Asts: J. Hart – 4	Pts: J. Woodard – 12; Rebs: B. Hield – 7 Asts: B. Hield, J. Woodard – 2

NRG Stadium – Houston, TX
Attendance: 75,505
Referees: Tom Eades, Tony Padilla, Mark Whitehead

TBS

Saturday, April 2
7:49 pm CDT

Box Score

#10 Syracuse Orange 66, #1 North Carolina Tar Heels 83
Scoring by half: 28–39, 38–44
Pts: T. Cooney – 22; Rebs: T. Roberson – 9 Asts: M. Gbinije – 2	Pts: B. Johnson, J. Jackson – 16; Rebs: B. Johnson – 9 Asts: J. Berry II – 10

NRG Stadium – Houston, TX
Attendance: 75,505
Referees: Jeff Clark, Roger Ayers, Mike Eades

The Villanova–Oklahoma result was not only the most one-sided in the tournament so far, but also in the history of the men's Final Four. The Wildcats shot 71.4% for the game, surpassed in Final Four games only by the Wildcats' 78.6% performance in the 1985 final against Georgetown. The 44-point margin was also greater than the combined margin of defeat in Oklahoma's seven previous losses in 2015–16. In addition, the 2016 semifinals were the first since 2008 to both be decided by double-digit margins, and the combined 61-point margin broke a men's Final Four record set in 1949.

==== National Championship ====
TBS

Monday, April 4
8:19 pm CDT

Box Score

#2 Villanova Wildcats 77, #1 North Carolina Tar Heels 74
Scoring by half: 34–39, 43–35
Pts: P. Booth – 20; Rebs: J. Hart – 8 Asts: R. Arcidiacono, D. Ochefu – 2	Pts: M. Paige – 21; Rebs: B. Johnson – 8 Asts: M. Paige – 6

NRG Stadium – Houston, TX
Attendance: 74,340
Referees: Michael Stephens, John Higgins, Terry Wymer

The Wildcats' Championship run was the 3rd most dominant in NCAA Tournament history, with a total point differential of +124 (breaking the 2009 record set by the North Carolina Tar Heels of +121), behind the 1996 Kentucky Wildcats (+129) and the 2024 UConn Huskies (+140).

==== Final Four all-tournament team ====
- Ryan Arcidiacono (Sr, Villanova) – Final Four Most Outstanding Player
- Josh Hart (Jr, Villanova)
- Phil Booth (So, Villanova)
- Joel Berry II (So, North Carolina)
- Brice Johnson (Sr, North Carolina)

== Tournament notes ==
America East Conference champion Stony Brook and WAC champion Cal State Bakersfield made their first NCAA Tournament appearances in school history.

Yale made its first NCAA appearance since 1962 as winners of the Ivy League, which, for the final time, did not stage a conference tournament. Of those that do hold a tournament, Horizon League champion Green Bay made its first appearance since 1996 and Oregon State made its first appearance since 1990.

Yale also earned its first Tournament win in school history with a 79–75 win over Baylor. Hawaii likewise earned its first NCAA Tournament win by defeating California 77–66. Arkansas-Little Rock won its first Tournament game in 30 years and Middle Tennessee won its first Tournament game in 27 years.

In the Midwest Region, No. 15 seed Middle Tennessee upset No. 2 seed Michigan State for just the eighth ever win for a No. 15 seed over a No. 2. More than one-third of ESPN Tournament Challenge brackets predicted Michigan State to make the Final Four.

In the East Region, No. 14 seed Stephen F. Austin upset No. 3 seed West Virginia, marking the fourth straight tournament in which a No. 14 seed upset a No. 3 seed.

By winning the Midwest Regional final, Syracuse became the first No. 10 seed in history to advance to the Final Four. However, six lower seeds, all No. 11, have advanced to that stage (in 1986, 2006, 2011, 2018, 2021, and 2024.

Kansas extended its streak of consecutive tournament appearances to 27 in a row, making every NCAA Tournament dating back to 1990. This tied the record for most consecutive NCAA Tournament appearances held by North Carolina (1975–2001).

This Tournament marked the first championship for Villanova in 31 years. It was also the first championship by a school without a Division I FBS football team since Connecticut in 1999. Villanova fields a Division I FCS football team, as did UConn before 2002.

=== Upsets ===
Per the NCAA, "Upsets are defined as when the winner of the game was seeded five or more places lower than the team it defeated."

The 2016 tournament saw a total of 11 upsets, with eight in the first round, two in the second round, and one in the Elite Eight.

Upsets in the 2016 NCAA Division I men's basketball tournament
Round	South	West	East	Midwest
Round of 64	No. 13 Hawaii defeated No. 4 California, 77–66; No. 11 Wichita State defeated No. 6 Arizona, 65–55	No. 12 Yale defeated No. 5 Baylor, 79–75; No. 11 Northern Iowa defeated No. 6 Texas, 75–72	No. 14 Stephen F. Austin defeated No. 3 West Virginia, 70–56	No. 15 Middle Tennessee defeated No. 2 Michigan State, 90–81; No. 12 Little Rock defeated No. 5 Purdue, 85–83 ^{2OT}; No. 11 Gonzaga defeated No. 6 Seton Hall, 68–52
Round of 32	None		No. 7 Wisconsin defeated No. 2 Xavier, 66–63	No. 11 Gonzaga defeated No. 3 Utah, 82–59
Sweet 16	None			
Elite 8	None			No. 10 Syracuse defeated No. 1 Virginia, 68–62
Final 4	None			
National Championship	None			

== Record by conference ==
Conference	Bids	Record	Win %	R64	R32	S16	E8	F4	CG	NC
Big East	5	9–4	.692	5	4	1	1	1	1	1
ACC	7	19–7	.731	7	6	6	4	2	1	–
Big 12	7	9–7	.563	7	3	3	2	1	–	–
Pac-12	7	4–7	.364	7	2	1	1	–	–	–
Big Ten	7	8–7	.533	7	4	3	–	–	–	–
SEC	3	3–3	.500	2	2	1	–	–	–	–
WCC	1	2–1	.667	1	1	1	–	–	–	–
Atlantic 10	3	2–3	.400	3	2	–	–	–	–	–
Missouri Valley	2	3–2	.600	2	2	–	–	–	–	–
American	4	1–4	.200	3	1	–	–	–	–	–
Big West	1	1–1	.500	1	1	–	–	–	–	–
C-USA	1	1–1	.500	1	1	–	–	–	–	–
Ivy League	1	1–1	.500	1	1	–	–	–	–	–
Southland	1	1–1	.500	1	1	–	–	–	–	–
Sun Belt	1	1–1	.500	1	1	–	–	–	–	–
Atlantic Sun	1	1–1	.500	1	–	–	–	–	–	–
Patriot	1	1–1	.500	1	–	–	–	–	–	–

- The R64, R32, S16, E8, F4, CG, and NC columns indicate how many teams from each conference were in the round of 64 (first round), round of 32 (second round), Sweet 16, Elite Eight, Final Four, championship game, and national champion, respectively.
- The "Record" column includes wins in the First Four for the Big Ten, Missouri Valley, Atlantic Sun, and Patriot conferences and losses in the First Four for the SEC and American conferences.
- The NEC and SWAC each had one representative, both eliminated in the First Four with a record of 0–1.
- The America East, Big Sky, Big South, CAA, Horizon, MAAC, MAC, MEAC, Mountain West, Ohio Valley, Southern, Summit, and WAC conferences each had one representative, eliminated in the first round with a record of 0–1.

== Media coverage ==
=== Television ===
CBS Sports and Turner Sports held joint U.S. television broadcast rights to the Tournament under the NCAA March Madness brand. Beginning in 2016, rights to the Final Four and championship game began to alternate between Turner and CBS, with Turner networks broadcasting the 2016 Final Four and championship; a conventional telecast aired on TBS, accompanied by "Team Stream" broadcasts on TNT and TruTV which featured commentary and coverage focused on each participating team. Turner employed this multi-channel presentation of the semifinals in 2014 and 2015, but this was the first time it was used for the final. It marked the first time in tournament history that the national championship game aired on cable channels, and ended CBS' streak of broadcasting 34 consecutive National Championship games. However, Turner allowed the tournament's closing theme, One Shining Moment, to be played for the 30th year in a row. To date, the song is still played in this manner, no matter which network airs the National Championship game.

For 2016, the selection show on CBS was expanded into a two-hour broadcast—a move which proved unpopular with viewers due to the decreased speed at which the participating teams were unveiled. These issues were exacerbated by a leak of the full bracket shortly into the broadcast, which spread on Twitter. Although ratings for the selection show had steadily decreased over the past four years, the 3.7 overnight rating for the broadcast was the lowest in 20 years. CBS Sports chairman Sean McManus admitted that the extended special was a failure, stating that "we haven't had any specific discussions but I think we all agree it would serve all of us well including the fan to release the brackets in a little more timely manner".

==== Studio hosts ====
- Greg Gumbel (New York City and Houston) – First round, second round, Regionals, Final Four and National Championship Game
- Ernie Johnson Jr. (New York City, Atlanta, and Houston) – First round, second round, Regional Semi-Finals, Final Four and National Championship Game
- Matt Winer (Atlanta) – First Four, First Round and Second Round

==== Studio analysts ====
- Charles Barkley (New York City and Houston) – First round, second round, Regionals, Final Four and National Championship Game
- Swin Cash (Atlanta) – First Four
- Seth Davis (Atlanta and Houston) – First Four, first round, second round, Regional Semi-Finals, Final Four and National Championship Game
- Johnny Dawkins (New York City) – Second Round
- Doug Gottlieb (New York City) – Regionals
- Ron Hunter (Atlanta) – First round
- Clark Kellogg (New York City and Houston) – First round, second round, Regionals, Final Four and National Championship Game
- Reggie Miller (Houston) – Final Four and National Championship Game
- Kenny Smith (New York City and Houston) – First round, second round, Regionals, Final Four and National Championship Game
- Steve Smith (Houston) – Final Four and National Championship Game
- Kevin Stallings (Atlanta) – Second Round
- Wally Szczerbiak (Atlanta) – First Four, first round, second round and Regional Semi-Finals
- Buzz Williams (Atlanta) – Regional Semi-Finals

==== Commentary teams ====
- Jim Nantz/Bill Raftery/Grant Hill/Tracy Wolfson/Craig Sager – First and Second Rounds at Des Moines, Iowa; South Regional at Louisville, Kentucky; Final Four and National Championship at Houston
  - Sager joined Nantz, Raftery, Hill, and Wolfson for the Championship Game to interview Michael Jordan
- Brian Anderson/Steve Smith/Dana Jacobson – First and Second Rounds at St. Louis, Missouri; East Regional at Philadelphia, Pennsylvania
- Verne Lundquist/Jim Spanarkel/Allie LaForce – First and Second Rounds at Brooklyn, New York; West Regional at Anaheim, California
- Kevin Harlan/Reggie Miller/Dan Bonner/Lewis Johnson – First and Second Rounds at Raleigh, North Carolina; Midwest Regional at Chicago
- Ian Eagle/Chris Webber/Len Elmore/Evan Washburn – First and Second Rounds at Providence, Rhode Island
- Spero Dedes/Doug Gottlieb/Rosalyn Gold-Onwude – First and Second Rounds at Spokane, Washington
- Andrew Catalon/Steve Lappas/Jamie Erdahl – First Four at Dayton, Ohio (Tuesday); First and Second Rounds at Denver, Colorado
- Carter Blackburn/Mike Gminski/Jaime Maggio – First Four at Dayton, Ohio (Wednesday); First and Second Rounds at Oklahoma City.

===== Team Stream broadcasts =====
Final Four

- Chad McKee/Eduardo Nájera/Jessica Coody – Oklahoma Team Stream on TNT
- Scott Graham/Brian Finneran/Kacie McDonnell – Villanova Team Stream on truTV
- Wes Durham/Brendan Haywood/Dwayne Ballen – North Carolina Team Stream on TNT
- Tom Werme/Roosevelt Bouie/Donovan McNabb – Syracuse Team Stream on truTV

National Championship Game

- Wes Durham/Brendan Haywood/Dwayne Ballen – North Carolina Team Stream on TNT
- Scott Graham/Brian Finneran/Kacie McDonnell – Villanova Team Stream on truTV

=== Radio ===
Westwood One had exclusive radio rights to the entire tournament.

==== First Four ====
- Craig Way and Kevin Grevey – at Dayton, Ohio

==== First and Second rounds ====
- Scott Graham and Donny Marshall – Providence, Rhode Island
- Brandon Gaudin and Mike Montgomery – Des Moines, Iowa
- John Sadak and Eric Montross/John Thompson – Raleigh, North Carolina (Montross – Thursday afternoon; Thompson – Thursday night & Saturday)
- Kevin Kugler and Jim Jackson – Denver, Colorado
- Chris Carrino and Kelly Tripucka – Brooklyn, New York City, New York
- Wayne Larrivee and Will Perdue – St. Louis, Missouri
- Tom McCarthy and P. J. Carlesimo – Oklahoma City, Oklahoma
- Kevin Calabro and Dan Dickau – Spokane, Washington

==== Regionals ====
- Tom McCarthy and John Thompson – East Regional at Philadelphia, Pennsylvania
- Gary Cohen and Jim Jackson – Midwest Regional at Chicago, Illinois
- Ian Eagle and P. J. Carlesimo – South Regional at Louisville, Kentucky
- Kevin Kugler and Donny Marshall – West Regional at Anaheim, California

==== Final Four ====
- Kevin Kugler, John Thompson, Clark Kellogg, and Jim Gray – Houston, Texas

=== Local radio ===
Seed	School	Station	Play–by–play	Color analyst	Studio host
South Region
2	Villanova	WTEL–AM 610 and Villanova IMG Sports Network	Ryan Fannon	Whitey Rigsby	Joe Weil
East Region
1	North Carolina	WCHL–AM 1360 and Tar Heel Sports Network	Jones Angell	Eric Montross	

=== Internet ===
The games were streamed on the NCAA March Madness Live website and app, with streams for Turner games also available on the Bleacher Report website and Team Stream app, and CBS games available on the CBS Sports website and app. Games on TBS were available on Watch TBS app. Games on TNT were made available on Watch TNT app. Games on TruTV were available on Watch TruTV app. Westwood One's radio broadcasts, including a "National Mix" channel consisting of whip-around coverage during the first and second rounds, was available on its website and on the TuneIn app.

The games were also viewable on the PlayStation 3, PlayStation 4, PlayStation Vita and Xbox One video game consoles via the PlayStation Vue (PS3/PS4; all games), Sling TV (XB1; TBS, TNT, TruTV games) and TuneIn (Vita/XB1; all games) apps.

== See also ==
- 2016 NCAA Division II men's basketball tournament
- 2016 NCAA Division III men's basketball tournament
- 2016 NCAA Division I women's basketball tournament
- 2016 NCAA Division II women's basketball tournament
- 2016 NCAA Division III women's basketball tournament
- 2016 National Invitation Tournament
- 2016 Women's National Invitation Tournament
- 2016 NAIA Division I men's basketball tournament
- 2016 NAIA Division II men's basketball tournament
- 2016 College Basketball Invitational
- 2016 CollegeInsider.com Postseason Tournament
- 2016 Vegas 16 Tournament

== Notes ==
1.The 15 teams that were ineligible, and the reasons for ineligibility:
Academic Progress Rate
Alcorn State
Central Arkansas
Florida A&M
Stetson
Other NCAA infractions
SMU
Self-imposed bans
Louisville
Missouri
Cal State Northridge
Pacific
Southern Miss
Reclassification
Abilene Christian
Grand Canyon
Incarnate Word
UMass Lowell
Northern Kentucky
