= 2016–17 Oklahoma State Cowboys basketball team =

American college basketball season

2016–17 Oklahoma State Cowboys basketball

NCAA tournament, First Round
- Conference: Big 12 Conference
- Record: 20–13 (9–9 Big 12)
- Head coach: Brad Underwood (1st season)
- Assistant coaches: Lamont Evans; Mike Boynton Jr.; Danny Henderson
- Home arena: Gallagher-Iba Arena

2016–17 Big 12 men's basketball standings
	Conf.				Overall
Team	W		L	PCT	W		L	PCT
No. 3 Kansas	16	–	2	.889	31	–	5	.861
No. 13 West Virginia	12	–	6	.667	28	–	9	.757
No. 12 Baylor	12	–	6	.667	27	–	8	.771
No. 16 Iowa State †	12	–	6	.667	24	–	11	.686
Oklahoma State	9	–	9	.500	20	–	13	.606
Kansas State	8	–	10	.444	21	–	14	.600
Texas Tech	6	–	12	.333	18	–	14	.563
TCU	6	–	12	.333	24	–	15	.615
Oklahoma	5	–	13	.278	11	–	20	.355
Texas	4	–	14	.222	11	–	22	.333
† 2017 Big 12 Tournament winner Rankings from AP poll

The 2016–17 Oklahoma State Cowboys basketball team represented Oklahoma State University in the 2016–17 NCAA Division I men's basketball season. They were led by first-head coach Brad Underwood. The Cowboys were members of the Big 12 Conference and played their home games at Gallagher-Iba Arena in Stillwater, Oklahoma. They finished the season 20–13, 9–9 in Big 12 play to finish in fifth place. They lost to Iowa State in the quarterfinals of the Big 12 tournament. They received an at-large bid to the NCAA tournament as the No. 10 seed in the Midwest region where they lost to Michigan in the first round.

On March 18, 2017, head coach Brad Underwood left the school to accept the head coaching position at Illinois after one year at OSU. The school promoted assistant coach Mike Boynton Jr. to head coach on March 24.

== Previous season ==
The Cowboys finished the 2015–16 season 12–20, 3–15 in Big 12 play to finish in ninth place. They lost in the first round of the Big 12 tournament to Kansas State.

On March 18, 2016, Travis Ford was fired after nine seasons at Oklahoma State. On May 22, 2016, Brad Underwood was hired as head coach.

== Departures ==
Name	Number	Pos.	Height	Weight	Year	Hometown	Notes
Ford Stuen	0	G	6'3"	190	Senior	Henderson, KY	Graduated
Tyree Griffin	2	G	5'10"	165	Sophomore	New Orleans, LA	Transferred to Southern Miss
Joe Burton	4	G/F	6'6"	215	Sophomore	Houston, TX	Transferred to Valparaiso
Jeff Newberry	22	G	6'2"	190	RS Senior	Atlanta, GA	Graduated
Chris Olivier	31	F	6'8"	245	RS Senior	Chicago, IL	Graduated
Anthony Allen	32	C	7'0"	240	RS Senior	Kingston, Jamaica	Graduated

== Recruits ==
College recruiting
Name	Hometown	School	Height	Weight	Commit date
Cameron McGriff #23 SF	Grand Prairie, TX	South Grand Prairie High School	6 ft 7 in (2.01 m)	205 lb (93 kg)	Sep 21, 2015
Cameron McGriff #23 SF	Recruit ratings: Scout: Rivals: 247Sports: ESPN:				
Lindy Waters III #37 SG	Norman, OK	Sunrise Christian Academy	6 ft 6 in (1.98 m)	195 lb (88 kg)	Nov 6, 2015
Lindy Waters III #37 SG	Recruit ratings: Scout: Rivals: 247Sports: ESPN:				
Thomas Dziagwa; PG	Tampa, FL	Tampa Catholic High School	6 ft 4 in (1.93 m)	180 lb (82 kg)	Sep 19, 2015
Thomas Dziagwa; PG	Recruit ratings: Scout: Rivals: 247Sports: ESPN:				
Brandon Averette; PG	Richardson, TX	Richardson High School	5 ft 10 in (1.78 m)	185 lb (84 kg)	Apr 13, 2016
Brandon Averette; PG	Recruit ratings: Scout: Rivals: 247Sports: ESPN:				
Overall recruit ranking:
Note: In many cases, Scout, Rivals, 247Sports, On3, and ESPN may conflict in their listings of height and weight.; In these cases, the average was taken. ESPN grades are on a 100-point scale.; Sources: "2016 Team Ranking". Rivals.

Note: Tyrek Coger was a junior college transfer from Cape Fear Community College who was to enroll in the fall of 2016. On July 21, 2016, Coger collapsed and died after a workout.

== Roster ==
2016–17 Oklahoma State Cowboys men's basketball team
Players
Coaches

Pos.	#	Name	Height	Weight	Year	Previous school	Hometown
G	0	Brandon Averette	5 ft 11 in (1.8 m)	175 lb (79 kg)	Fr	Richardson	Richardson, TX
G	1	Jawun Evans	6 ft 1 in (1.85 m)	185 lb (84 kg)	So	Kimball	Dallas, TX
G	4	Thomas Dziagwa	6 ft 4 in (1.93 m)	180 lb (82 kg)	Fr	Tampa Catholic	Tampa, FL
G/F	5	Tavarius Shine	6 ft 6 in (1.98 m)	200 lb (91 kg)	Jr	MacArthur; FUMA	Irving, TX
F	12	Cameron McGriff	6 ft 7 in (2.01 m)	210 lb (95 kg)	Fr	South Grand Prairie	Grand Prairie, TX
G	13	Phil Forte III	5 ft 11 in (1.8 m)	195 lb (88 kg)	RS Sr	Marcus	Flower Mound, TX
F/C	14	Lucas N'Guessan	7 ft 0 in (2.13 m)	215 lb (98 kg)	Fr	Canarias Basketball Academy	De Lier, Netherlands
G	21	Lindy Waters III	6 ft 6 in (1.98 m)	200 lb (91 kg)	Fr	Norman North	Norman, OK
F	23	Leyton Hammonds	6 ft 8 in (2.03 m)	215 lb (98 kg)	Sr	Richland	North Richland Hills, TX
G/F	24	Davon Dillard	6 ft 5 in (1.96 m)	215 lb (98 kg)	So	Our Savior New American School	Gary, IN
G/F	30	Jeffrey Carroll	6 ft 6 in (1.98 m)	215 lb (98 kg)	RS Jr	Rowlett	Rowlett, TX
G	32	Tyler Underwood	6 ft 2 in (1.88 m)	160 lb (73 kg)	RS Fr	Nacogdoches	Nacogdoches, TX
F	33	Trey Reeves (W)	6 ft 4 in (1.93 m)	215 lb (98 kg)	Fr	Muldrow	Gans, OK
F	34	Will Lienhard (W)	6 ft 7 in (2.01 m)	255 lb (116 kg)	So	Bishop McGuinness	Oklahoma City, OK
F	41	Mitchell Solomon	6 ft 9 in (2.06 m)	245 lb (111 kg)	Jr	Bixby	Bixby, OK

Head coach

- Brad Underwood (Kansas State)

Assistant coach(es)

- Lamont Evans (Kansas State)
- Mike Boynton, Jr. (South Carolina)
- Danny Henderson (Austin College)

Legend

- (C) Team captain
- (S) Suspended
- (I) Ineligible
- (W) Walk-on
- Injured
- Current redshirt

Roster

== Schedule and results ==
Date time, TV	Rank^{#}	Opponent^{#}	Result	Record	Site (attendance) city, state
Exhibition
11/06/2016*; 7:00 pm, FSOK+		Pittsburg State	W 117-64		Gallagher-Iba Arena (3,009); Stillwater, OK
Regular season
11/11/2016*; 7:00 pm, FCS		Campbell	W 102–65	1–0	Gallagher-Iba Arena (6,126); Stillwater, OK
11/14/2016*; 7:00 pm, FSOK+		Central Arkansas; Maui Invitational opening round	W 102–90	2–0	Gallagher-Iba Arena (4,911); Stillwater, OK
11/16/2016*; 7:00 pm, FSOK+		New Orleans	W 117–72	3–0	Gallagher-Iba Arena (4,992); Stillwater, OK
11/21/2016*; 8:00 pm, ESPNU		vs. UConn; Maui Invitational quarterfinals	W 98–90	4–0	Lahaina Civic Center (2,400); Maui, HI
11/22/2016*; 9:30 pm, ESPN		vs. No. 4 North Carolina; Maui Invitational semifinals	L 75–107	4–1	Lahaina Civic Center (2,400); Maui, HI
11/23/2016*; 6:30 pm, ESPN2		vs. Georgetown; Maui Invitational third place game	W 97–70	5–1	Lahaina Civic Center (2,400); Maui, HI
11/30/2016*; 7:00 pm, FSOK+		Rogers State	W 101–85	6–1	Gallagher-Iba Arena (13,611); Stillwater, OK
12/03/2016*; 8:00 pm, BTN		at Maryland	L 70–71	6–2	Xfinity Center (17,950); College Park, MD
12/10/2016*; 4:00 pm, CBSSN		at Tulsa	W 71–67	7–2	Reynolds Center (5,287); Tulsa, OK
12/14/2016*; 8:00 pm, ESPNU		Arkansas–Pine Bluff	W 102–66	8–2	Gallagher-Iba Arena (5,287); Stillwater, OK
12/17/2016*; 6:00 pm, ESPN3		at Wichita State	W 93–76	9–2	Charles Koch Arena (15,004); Wichita, KS
12/22/2016*; 12:00 pm, FSOK		Texas A&M–Corpus Christi	W 92–70	10–2	Gallagher-Iba Arena (8,342); Stillwater, OK
12/30/2016; 3:00 pm, ESPN2		No. 11 West Virginia	L 72–95	10–3 (0–1)	Gallagher-Iba Arena (13,611); Stillwater, OK
01/04/2017; 7:00 pm, LHN		at Texas	L 79–82	10–4 (0–2)	Frank Erwin Center (9,753); Austin, TX
01/07/2017; 6:00 pm, ESPNews		at No. 2 Baylor	L 57–61	10–5 (0–3)	Ferrell Center (10,627); Waco, TX
01/11/2017; 8:00 pm, ESPNU		Iowa State	L 86–96	10–6 (0–4)	Gallagher-Iba Arena (6,066); Stillwater, OK
01/14/2017; 1:00 pm, ESPN2		at No. 2 Kansas	L 80–87	10–7 (0–5)	Allen Fieldhouse (16,300); Lawrence, KS
01/18/2017; 8:00 pm, ESPNU		Kansas State	L 88–96	10–8 (0–6)	Gallagher-Iba Arena (6,673); Stillwater, OK
01/21/2017; 1:00 pm, ESPNU		at Texas Tech	W 83–64	11–8 (1–6)	United Supermarkets Arena (11,360); Lubbock, TX
01/23/2017; 6:00 pm, ESPNU		TCU	W 89–76	12–8 (2–6)	Gallagher-Iba Arena (6,090); Stillwater, OK
01/28/2017*; 3:00 pm, ESPNU		Arkansas; Big 12/SEC Challenge	W 99–71	13–8	Gallagher-Iba Arena (13,611); Stillwater, OK
01/30/2017; 8:00 pm, ESPN		at Oklahoma; Bedlam Series	W 68–66	14–8 (3–6)	Lloyd Noble Center (10,103); Norman, OK
02/04/2017; 4:00 pm, ESPNU		at No. 7 West Virginia	W 82–75	15–8 (4–6)	WVU Coliseum (14,225); Morgantown, WV
02/08/2017; 6:00 pm, ESPNU		No. 6 Baylor	L 69–72	15–9 (4–7)	Gallagher-Iba Arena (8,170); Stillwater, OK
02/11/2017; 3:00 pm, ESPN2		Texas	W 84–71	16–9 (5–7)	Gallagher-Iba Arena (8,592); Stillwater, OK
02/15/2017; 8:00 pm, ESPNU		at TCU	W 71–68	17–9 (6–7)	Schollmaier Arena (6,301); Fort Worth, TX
02/18/2017; 8:00 pm, ESPNU		Oklahoma; Bedlam Series	W 96–92	18–9 (7–7)	Gallagher-Iba Arena (13,611); Stillwater, OK
02/22/2017; 8:00 pm, ESPNU		at Kansas State	W 80–68	19–9 (8–7)	Bramlage Coliseum (11,160); Manhattan, KS
02/25/2017; 1:00 pm, ESPNU		Texas Tech	W 80–63	20–9 (9–7)	Gallagher-Iba Arena (7,835); Stillwater, OK
02/28/2017; 8:00 pm, ESPN2		at No. 24 Iowa State	L 83–86	20–10 (9–8)	Hilton Coliseum (14,356); Ames, IA
03/04/2017; 5:00 pm, ESPN		No. 1 Kansas	L 85–90	20–11 (9–9)	Gallagher-Iba Arena (13,611); Stillwater, OK
Big 12 tournament
03/09/2017; 11:30 am, ESPN2	(5)	vs. (4) No. 23 Iowa State; Quarterfinals	L 83–92	20–12	Sprint Center (18,643); Kansas City, MO
NCAA tournament
03/17/2017; 11:15 am, CBS	(10 MW)	vs. (7 MW) No. 23 Michigan; First Round	L 91–92	20–13	Bankers Life Fieldhouse (18,255); Indianapolis, IN
*Non-conference game. ^{#}Rankings from AP Poll. (#) Tournament seedings in parentheses. MW=Midwest. All times are in Central Time.

CSN = Cowboy Sports Network. The Cowboy Sports Network is affiliated with Fox Sports Net. Games could air on Fox Sports Oklahoma, Fox Sports Oklahoma Plus, Fox Sports Southwest, Fox Sports Southwest Plus, or Fox College Sports.
