= 2016–17 Big 12 Conference men's basketball season =

2016–17 Big 12 Men's Basketball Season
- League: NCAA Division I
- Sport: Basketball
- Teams: 10
- TV partner(s): CBS, ESPN, FSN

Regular season
- 2017 Big 12 Champions: Kansas
- Season MVP: Frank Mason III
- Top scorer: Frank Mason III

Tournament
- Champions: Iowa State
- Runners-up: West Virginia
- Finals MVP: Monte Morris

Basketball seasons
- ← 2015–16 2017–18 →

2016–17 Big 12 men's basketball standings
	Conf.				Overall
Team	W		L	PCT	W		L	PCT
No. 3 Kansas	16	–	2	.889	31	–	5	.861
No. 13 West Virginia	12	–	6	.667	28	–	9	.757
No. 12 Baylor	12	–	6	.667	27	–	8	.771
No. 16 Iowa State †	12	–	6	.667	24	–	11	.686
Oklahoma State	9	–	9	.500	20	–	13	.606
Kansas State	8	–	10	.444	21	–	14	.600
Texas Tech	6	–	12	.333	18	–	14	.563
TCU	6	–	12	.333	24	–	15	.615
Oklahoma	5	–	13	.278	11	–	20	.355
Texas	4	–	14	.222	11	–	22	.333
† 2017 Big 12 Tournament winner Rankings from AP poll

The 2016–17 Big 12 men's basketball season is the ongoing 21st season of basketball for the Big 12 Conference. Team practices began in October 2016, and were followed by the start of the regular season on November 11. Conference play began on December 30, 2016 and will conclude with the 2017 Big 12 men's basketball tournament, beginning March 8, 2017 at the Sprint Center in Kansas City. During the conference's non-conference schedule, Big 12 teams posted a win percentage of .822, the best non-conference win percentage of any conference in the nation.

== Preseason ==
Big 12 recruits at the 2016 McDonald's All-American Boys Game

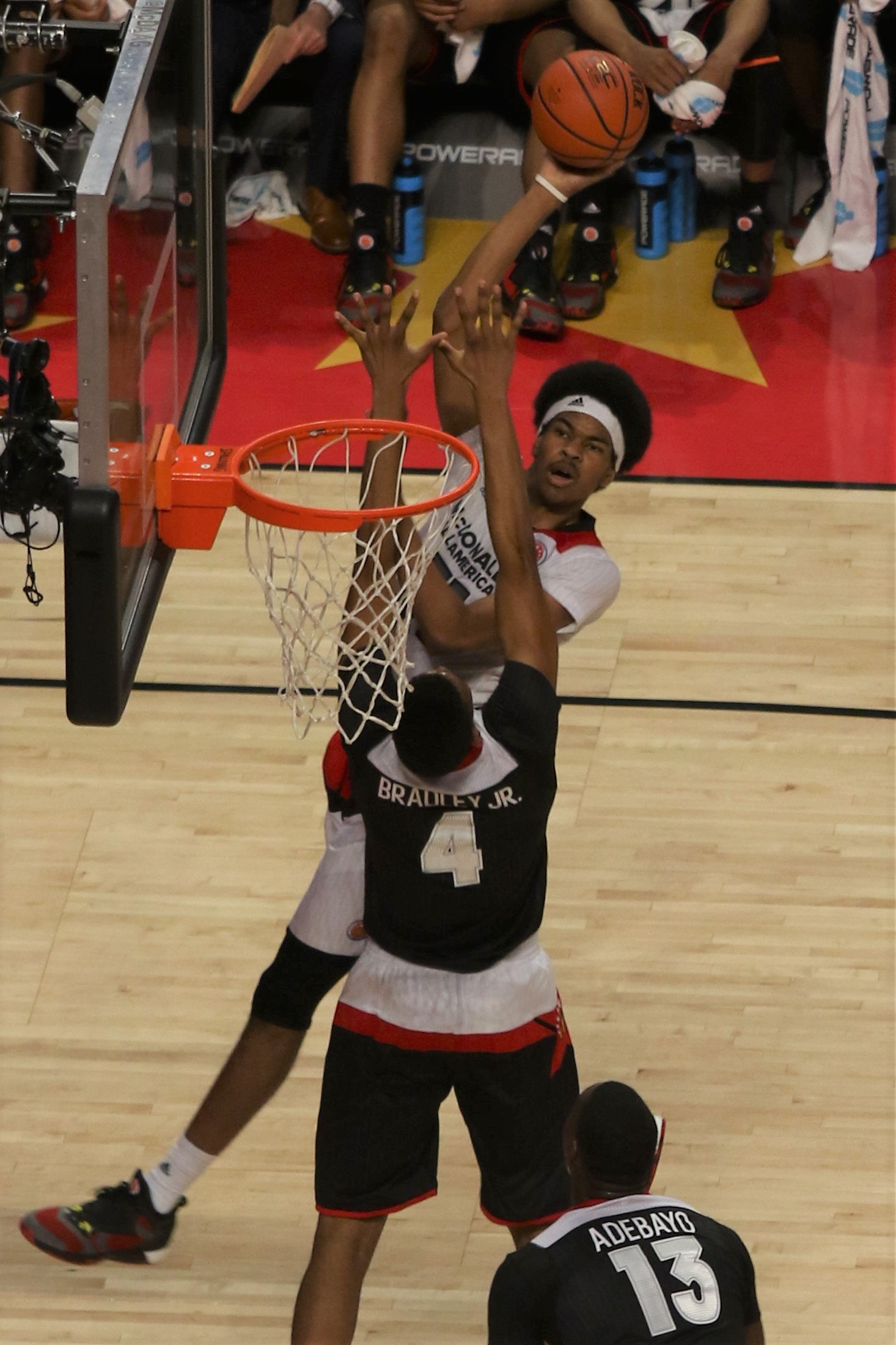
Jarrett Allen, Texas

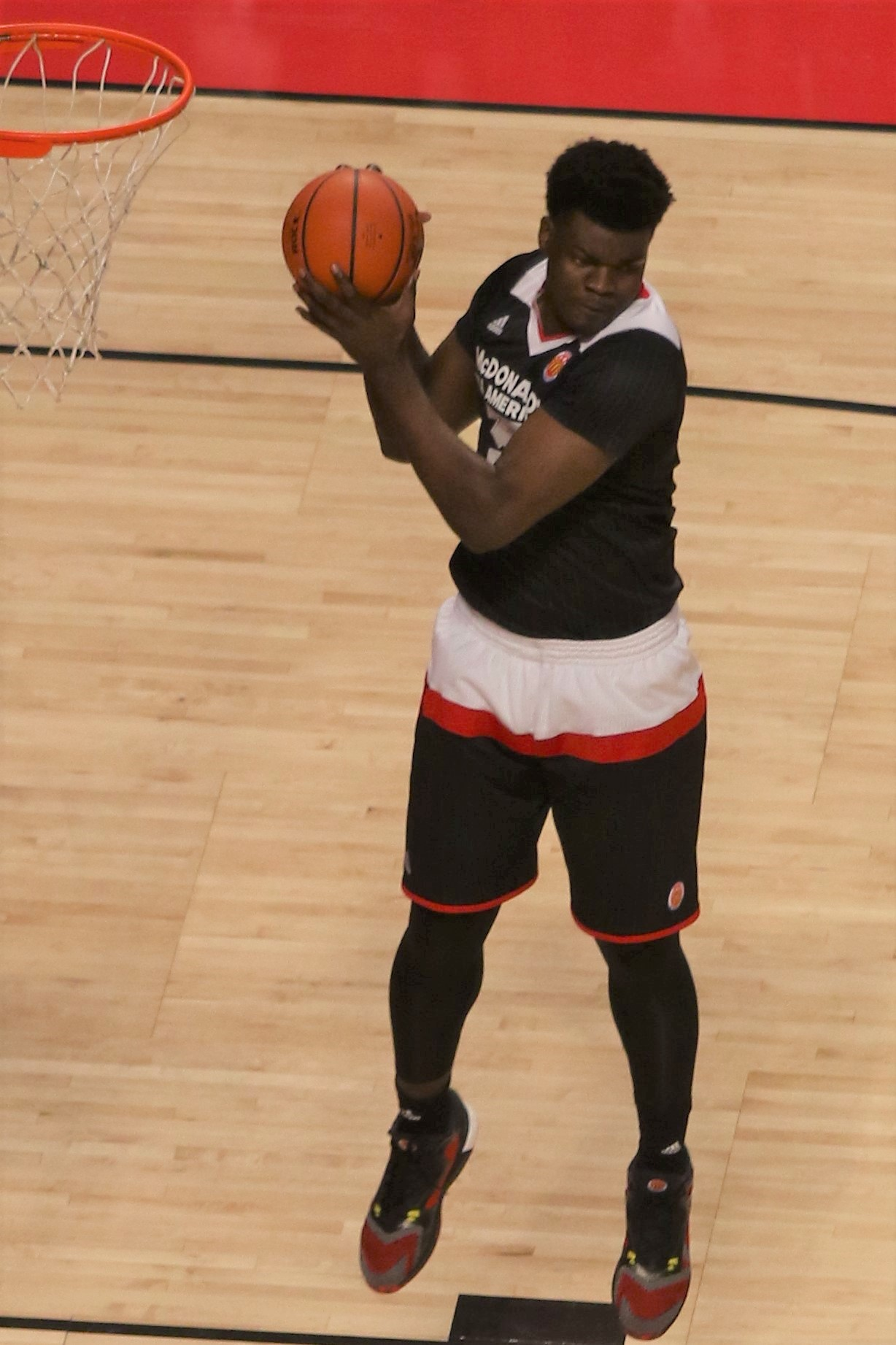
Udoka Azubuike, Kansas

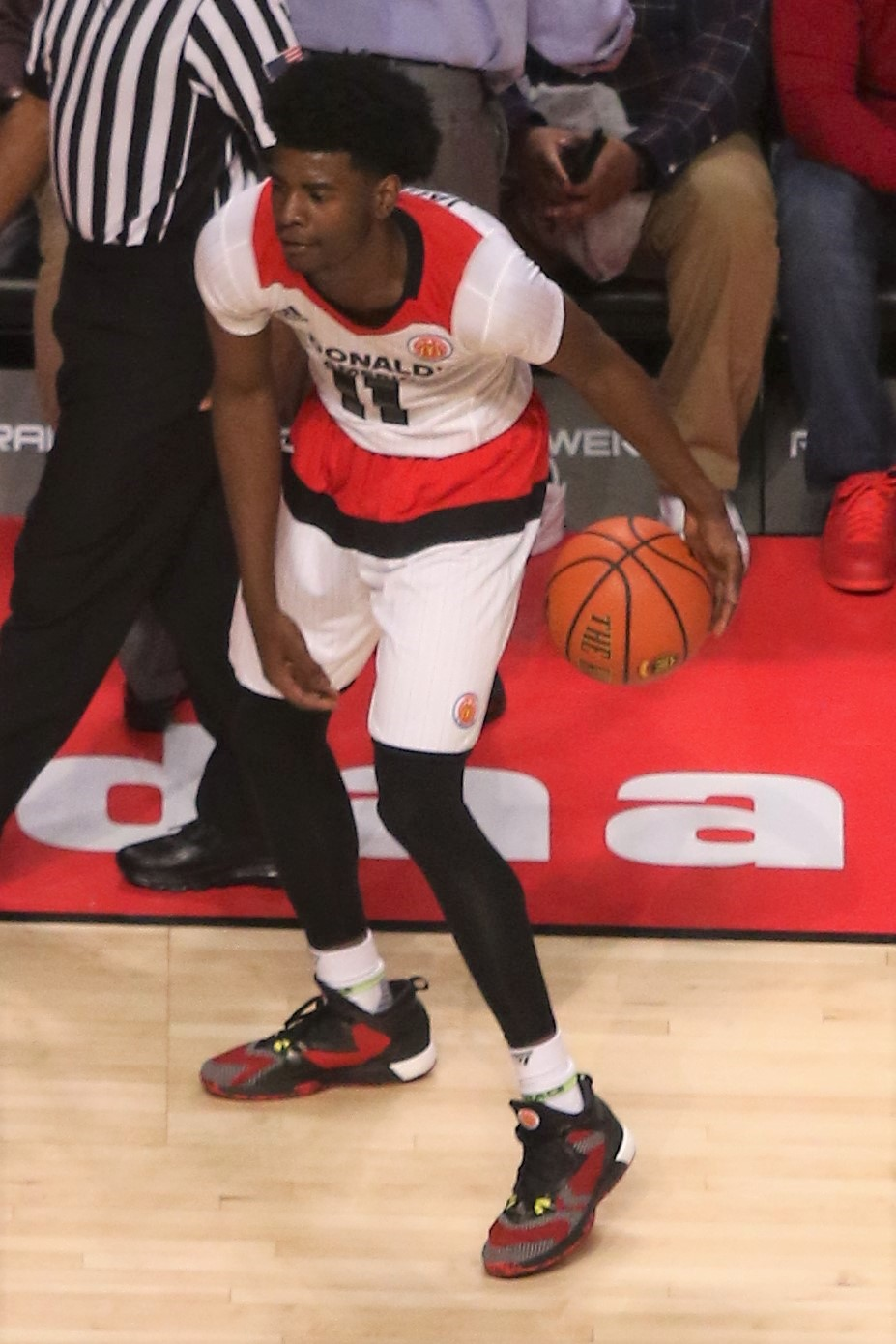
Josh Jackson, Kansas

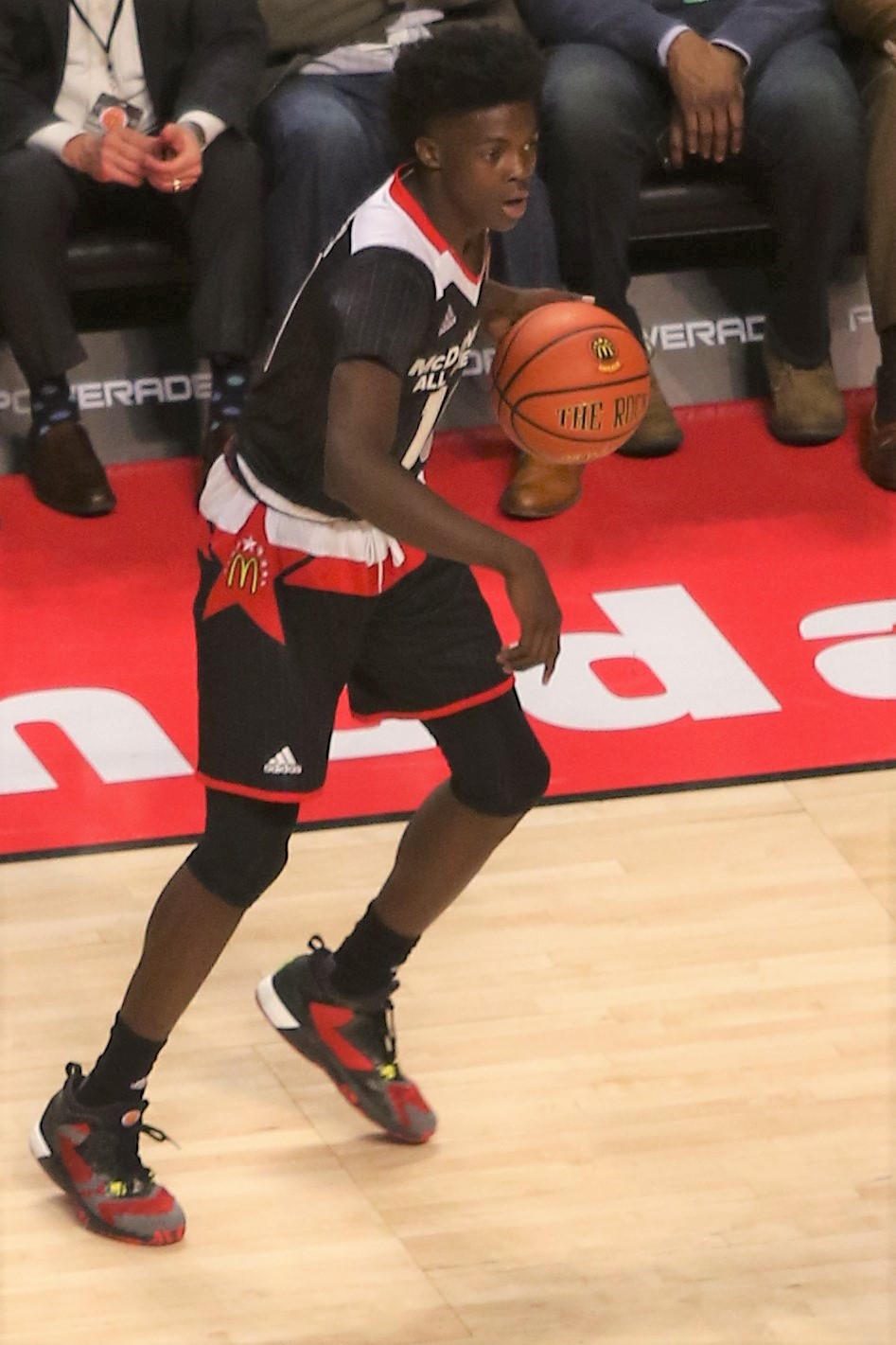
Andrew Jones, Texas

Big 12 Preseason Poll

	Big 12 Coaches	Points
1.	Kansas (9)	81
2.	West Virginia	65
3.	Texas	59
4.	Iowa State (1)	56
5.	Baylor	53
6.	Oklahoma	40
7.	Oklahoma State	32
7.	Texas Tech	32
9.	Kansas State	20
10.	TCU	12
Reference: (#) first place votes

Pre-Season All-Big 12 Team

Big 12 Coaches
Jawun Evans, G Oklahoma State
Frank Mason III, G Kansas
Devonte' Graham, G Kansas
Monte Morris, G Iowa State
Johnathan Motley, F Baylor

- Player of the Year: Monte Morris, Iowa State
- Newcomer of the Year: Manu Lecomte, Baylor
- Freshman of the Year: Josh Jackson, Kansas

=== Tournaments ===
Team	Tournament	Finish
Baylor	Battle 4 Atlantis	Champions
Iowa State	AdvoCare Invitational	Runner-Up
Kansas	CBE Hall of Fame Classic	Champions
Kansas State	Barclays Center Classic	Runner-Up
Oklahoma	Puerto Rico Tip-Off	3rd Place
Oklahoma State	Maui Invitational	3rd Place
TCU	Global Sports Classic	Champions
Texas	Legends Classic	4th Place
Texas Tech	Cancún Challenge	3rd Place
West Virginia	NIT Season Tip-Off	Runner-Up

== Head coaches ==
Note: Stats shown are before the beginning of the season. Overall and Big 12 records are from time at current school.

Team	Head coach	Previous job	Seasons at school	Overall record	Big 12 record	NCAA tournaments	NCAA Final Fours	NCAA Championships
Baylor	Scott Drew	Valparaiso	14th	252–172 (.594)	95–121 (.440)	6	0	0
Iowa State	Steve Prohm	Murray State	2nd	25–12 (.676)	10–8 (.556)	1	0	0
Kansas	Bill Self	Illinois	14th	385–83 (.823)	179–39 (.821)	13	2	1
Kansas State	Bruce Weber	Illinois	5th	79–54 (.594)	37–35 (.514)	2	0	0
Oklahoma	Lon Kruger	UNLV	6th	111–57 (.661)	52–38 (.578)	4	1	0
Oklahoma State	Brad Underwood	Stephen F. Austin	1st	0–0 (–)	0–0 (–)	0	0	0
TCU	Jamie Dixon	Pittsburgh	1st	0–0 (–)	0–0 (–)	0	0	0
Texas	Shaka Smart	VCU	2nd	20–13 (.606)	11–7 (.611)	1	0	0
Texas Tech	Chris Beard	Little Rock	1st	0–0 (–)	0–0 (–)	0	0	0
West Virginia	Bob Huggins	Kansas State	10th	201–110 (.646)	39–33 (.542)	7	1	0

== Rankings ==
Legend
Increase in ranking
Decrease in ranking
Not ranked previous week

		Pre	Wk 2	Wk 3	Wk 4	Wk 5	Wk 6	Wk 7	Wk 8	Wk 9	Wk 10	Wk 11	Wk 12	Wk 13	Wk 14	Wk 15	Wk 16	Wk 17	Wk 18	Wk 19	Final
Baylor	AP			20	9	4	4	4	4	2	1	6	5	2	6	4	9	11	9	12	
Baylor	C			RV	11	6	5	6	4	3	1	6	5	3	8	4	9	11	10	11	12
Iowa State	AP	24	20	21	19	25	RV	RV	RV	RV	RV	RV	RV	RV	RV	RV	RV	24	23	16	
Iowa State	C	RV	23	22	21	25	RV				RV		RV		RV		RV	24	24	20	25
Kansas	AP	3	7	5	4	3	3	3	3	3	2	2	2	3	3	3	3	1	1	3	
Kansas	C	2	8	6	5	3	3	3	3	2	2	1	1	2	3	3	3	1	1	3	4
Kansas State	AP						RV	RV		RV	25	RV	RV		RV						
Kansas State	C	RV								RV	RV	RV	RV	RV	RV	RV	RV				
Oklahoma	AP	RV	RV																		
Oklahoma	C	RV	RV	RV	RV																
Oklahoma State	AP							RV	RV						RV	RV	RV	RV	RV	RV	
Oklahoma State	C				RV	RV	RV	RV	RV	RV					RV			RV	RV	RV	RV
TCU	AP					RV	RV					RV									
TCU	C					RV	RV	RV	RV			RV									RV
Texas	AP	21	23	22																	
Texas	C	22	21	21	RV																
Texas Tech	AP																				
Texas Tech	C							RV													
West Virginia	AP	20	19	19	25	15	12	11	11	7	10	7	18	7	13	9	12	10	11	13	
West Virginia	C	18	19	17	19	16	13	12	12	7	9	8	18	12	14	12	13	10	11	12	11

== Regular season ==
=== Conference matrix ===
	Baylor	Iowa State	Kansas	Kansas State	Oklahoma	Oklahoma State	TCU	Texas	Texas Tech	West Virginia
vs. Baylor	—	1–1	2–0	1–1	0–2	0–2	0–2	0–2	1–1	1–1
vs. Iowa State	1–1	—	1–1	0–2	0–2	0–2	1–1	1–1	0–2	2–0
vs. Kansas	0–2	1–1	—	0–2	0–2	0–2	0–2	0–2	0–2	1–1
vs. Kansas State	1–1	2–0	2–0	—	1–1	1–1	1–1	0–2	1–1	1–1
vs. Oklahoma	2–0	2–0	2–0	1–1	—	2–0	1–1	1–1	1–1	1–1
vs. Oklahoma State	2–0	2–0	2–0	1–1	0–2	—	0–2	1–1	0–2	1–1
vs. TCU	2–0	1–1	2–0	1–1	1–1	2–0	—	0–2	1–1	2–0
vs. Texas	2–0	1–1	2–0	2–0	1–1	1–1	2–0	—	1–1	2–0
vs. Texas Tech	1–1	2–0	2–0	1–1	1–1	2–0	1–1	1–1	—	1–1
vs. West Virginia	1–1	0–2	1–1	1–1	1–1	1–1	0–2	0–2	1–1	—
Total	12–6	12–6	16–2	8–10	5–13	9–9	6–12	4–14	6–12	12–6

=== Points scored ===
Team	For	Against	Difference
Baylor	1230	1158	72
Iowa State	1408	1363	45
Kansas	1447	1345	102
Kansas State	1272	1326	-54
Oklahoma	1266	1330	-64
Oklahoma State	1435	1405	30
TCU	1243	1314	-71
Texas	1202	1314	-112
Texas Tech	1233	1304	-71
West Virginia	1416	1296	120

== Schedules ==
=== Baylor ===
Baylor Bears Schedule
Date time, TV	Rank^{#}	Opponent^{#}	Result	Record	Site (attendance) city, state
Big 12 Regular season
December 30, 2016; 6:00 pm, ESPN2	No. 4	at Oklahoma	W 76–50	13–0 (1–0)	Lloyd Noble Center (10,254); Norman, OK
January 4, 2017; 7:00 pm, ESPNews	No. 2	Iowa State	W 65–63	14–0 (2–0)	Ferrell Center (7,582); Waco, TX
January 7, 2017; 6:00 pm, ESPNews	No. 2	Oklahoma State	W 61–57	15–0 (3–0)	Ferrell Center (10,627); Waco, TX
January 10, 2017; 6:00 pm, ESPN2	No. 1	at No. 10 West Virginia	L 68–89	15–1 (3–1)	WVU Coliseum (14,632); Morgantown, WV
January 14, 2017; 3:30 pm, ESPNU	No. 1	at No. 25 Kansas State	W 77–68	16–1 (4–1)	Bramlage Coliseum (12,528); Manhattan, KS
January 17, 2017; 6:00 pm, ESPN2	No. 6	Texas	W 74–64	17–1 (5–1)	Ferrell Center (7,604); Waco, TX
January 21, 2017; 7:00 pm, ESPNU	No. 6	at TCU	W 62–53	18–1 (6–1)	Schollmaier Arena (7,276); Fort Worth, TX
January 25, 2017; 7:00 pm, ESPNews	No. 5	Texas Tech	W 65–61	19–1 (7–1)	Ferrell Center (7,059); Waco, TX
January 28, 2017*; 5:00 pm, ESPN2	No. 5	at Ole Miss; Big 12/SEC Challenge	W 78–75	20–1	The Pavilion at Ole Miss (9,411); Oxford, MS
February 1, 2017; 8:00 pm, ESPN2	No. 2	at No. 3 Kansas	L 68–73	20–2 (7–2)	Allen Fieldhouse (16,300); Lawrence, KS
February 4, 2017; 2:00 pm, ESPNews	No. 2	Kansas State	L 54–56	20–3 (7–3)	Ferrell Center (7,729); Waco, TX
February 8, 2017; 6:00 pm, ESPNU	No. 6	at Oklahoma State	W 72–69	21–3 (8–3)	Gallagher-Iba Arena (8,170); Stillwater, OK
February 11, 2017; 1:00 pm, ESPNU	No. 6	TCU	W 70–52	22–3 (9–3)	Ferrell Center (7,906); Waco, TX
February 13, 2017; 6:00 pm, ESPNews	No. 4	at Texas Tech	L 78–84	22–4 (9–4)	United Supermarkets Arena (9,202); Lubbock, TX
February 18, 2017; 12:00 pm, CBS	No. 4	No. 3 Kansas	L 65–67	22–5 (9–5)	Ferrell Center (10,021); Waco, TX
February 21, 2017; 6:00 pm, ESPN2	No. 9	Oklahoma	W 60–54	23–5 (10–5)	Ferrell Center (6,135); Waco, TX
February 25, 2017; 3:00 pm, ESPN	No. 9	at Iowa State	L 69–72	23–6 (10–6)	Hilton Coliseum (14,384); Ames, IA
February 27, 2017; 6:00 pm, ESPNU	No. 11	No. 10 West Virginia	W 71–62	24–6 (11–6)	Ferrell Center (8,203); Waco, TX
March 4, 2017; 3:00 pm, ESPN	No. 11	at Texas	W 75–64	25–6 (12–6)	Frank Erwin Center (12,195); Austin, TX
Big 12 tournament
March 9, 2017; 8:00 pm, ESPNU	No. 9	vs. (6) Kansas State; Big 12 tournament quarterfinals	L 64–70	25–7	Sprint Center; Kansas City, MO
*Non-conference game. ^{#}Rankings from AP Poll. (#) Tournament seedings in parentheses. All times are in Central Time.

=== Iowa State ===
Iowa State Cyclones Schedule
Date time, TV	Rank^{#}	Opponent^{#}	Result	Record	Site (attendance) city, state
Big 12 Regular season
December 30, 2016; 5:00 pm, ESPNews		Texas Tech	W 63–56	9–3 (1–0)	Hilton Coliseum (14,384); Ames, IA
January 4, 2017; 7:00 pm, ESPNews		at No. 2 Baylor	L 63–65	9–4 (1–1)	Ferrell Center (7,582); Waco, TX
January 7, 2017; 8:15 pm, ESPN2		Texas	W 79–70	10–4 (2–1)	Hilton Coliseum (14,384); Ames, IA
January 11, 2017; 8:00 pm, ESPNU		at Oklahoma State	W 96-86	11–4 (3–1)	Gallagher-Iba Arena (6,066); Stillwater, OK
January 14, 2017; 4:30 pm, FSN		at TCU	L 77–84	11–5 (3–2)	Schollmaier Arena (6,564); Fort Worth, TX
January 16, 2017; 8:00 pm, ESPN		No. 2 Kansas	L 72–76	11–6 (3–3)	Hilton Coliseum (14,384); Ames, IA
January 21, 2017; 1:00 pm, ESPN2		at Oklahoma	W 92–87 ^{2OT}	12–6 (4–3)	Lloyd Noble Center (9,673); Norman, OK
January 24, 2017; 8:00 pm, ESPNU		Kansas State	W 70–65	13–6 (5–3)	Hilton Coliseum (14,384); Ames, IA
January 28, 2017*; 3:00 pm, ESPN2		at Vanderbilt; Big 12/SEC Challenge	L 78–84	13–7	Memorial Gymnasium (9,851); Nashville, TN
January 31, 2017; 8:00 pm, ESPN2		No. 7 West Virginia	L 72–85	13–8 (5–4)	Hilton Coliseum (14,384); Ames, IA
February 4, 2017; 1:00 pm, ESPN		at No. 3 Kansas	W 92–89 ^{OT}	14–8 (6–4)	Allen Fieldhouse (16,300); Lawrence, KS
February 7, 2017; 8:00 pm, ESPN2		at Texas	L 65–67	14–9 (6–5)	Frank Erwin Center (10,048); Austin, TX
February 11, 2017; 5:00 pm, ESPN2		Oklahoma	W 80–64	15–9 (7–5)	Hilton Coliseum (14,384); Ames, IA
February 15, 2017; 6:00 pm, ESPN2		at Kansas State	W 87–79	16–9 (8–5)	Bramlage Coliseum (11,387); Manhattan, KS
February 18, 2017; 5:00 pm, ESPNews		TCU	W 84–71	17–9 (9–5)	Hilton Coliseum (14,384); Ames, IA
February 20, 2017; 8:00 pm, ESPNU		at Texas Tech	W 82–80 ^{OT}	18–9 (10–5)	United Supermarkets Arena (8,389); Lubbock, TX
February 25, 2017; 3:00 pm, ESPN		No. 9 Baylor	W 72–69	19–9 (11–5)	Hilton Coliseum (14,384); Ames, IA
February 28, 2017; 8:00 pm, ESPN2	No. 24	Oklahoma State	W 86–83	20–9 (12–5)	Hilton Coliseum (14,384); Ames, IA
March 3, 2017; 6:00 pm, ESPN2	No. 24	at No. 10 West Virginia	L 76–87	20–10 (12–6)	WVU Coliseum (14,528); Morgantown, WV
Big 12 tournament
March 9, 2017; 11:30 am, ESPN2	No. 23	vs. (5) Oklahoma State; Big 12 tournament quarterfinals	W 92–83	21–10	Sprint Center; Kansas City, MO
March 10, 2017; 6:00 pm, ESPN	No. 23	vs. (8) TCU; Big 12 tournament semifinals	W 84–63	22–10	Sprint Center; Kansas City, MO
March 11, 2017; 5:00 pm, ESPN	No. 23	vs. No. 11 (2) West Virginia; Big 12 tournament championship	W 80–74	23–10	Sprint Center; Kansas City, MO
*Non-conference game. ^{#}Rankings from AP Poll. (#) Tournament seedings in parentheses. All times are in Central Time.

=== Kansas ===
Kansas Jayhawks Schedule
Date time, TV	Rank^{#}	Opponent^{#}	Result	Record	Site (attendance) city, state
Big 12 Regular season
December 30, 2016; 8:00 PM, ESPN2	No. 3	at TCU	W 86–80	12–1 (1–0)	Schollmaier Arena (6,579); Fort Worth, TX
January 3, 2017; 8:00 PM, ESPN2	No. 3	Kansas State; Sunflower Showdown	W 90–88	13–1 (2–0)	Allen Fieldhouse (16,300); Lawrence, KS
January 7, 2017; 6:15 pm, ESPN2	No. 3	Texas Tech	W 85–68	14–1 (3–0)	Allen Fieldhouse (16,300); Lawrence, KS
January 10, 2017; 8:00 PM, ESPN2	No. 2	at Oklahoma	W 81–70	15–1 (4–0)	Lloyd Noble Center (9,788); Norman, OK
January 14, 2017; 1:00 PM, ESPN2	No. 2	Oklahoma State	W 87–80	16–1 (5–0)	Allen Fieldhouse (16,300); Lawrence, KS
January 16, 2017; 8:00 PM, ESPN	No. 2	at Iowa State	W 76–72	17–1 (6–0)	Hilton Coliseum (14,384); Ames, IA
January 21, 2017; 1:00 PM, CBS	No. 2	Texas	W 79–67	18–1 (7–0)	Allen Fieldhouse (16,300); Lawrence, KS
January 24, 2017; 6:00 PM, ESPN2	No. 2	at No. 18 West Virginia	L 69–85	18–2 (7–1)	WVU Coliseum (13,694); Morgantown, WV
January 28, 2017*; 5:00 PM, ESPN	No. 2	at No. 4 Kentucky; Big 12/SEC Challenge	W 79–73	19–2	Rupp Arena (24,418); Lexington, KY
February 1, 2017; 8:00 PM, ESPN2	No. 3	No. 2 Baylor	W 73–68	20–2 (8–1)	Allen Fieldhouse (16,300); Lawrence, KS
February 4, 2017; 1:00 PM, ESPN	No. 3	Iowa State	L 89–92 ^{OT}	20–3 (8–2)	Allen Fieldhouse (16,300); Lawrence, KS
February 6, 2017; 8:00 PM, ESPN	No. 3	at Kansas State; Sunflower Showdown	W 74–71	21–3 (9–2)	Bramlage Coliseum (12,528); Manhattan, KS
February 11, 2017; 1:00 PM, ESPN	No. 3	at Texas Tech	W 80–79	22–3 (10–2)	United Supermarkets Arena (16,300); Lubbock, TX
February 13, 2017; 8:00 PM, ESPN	No. 3	No. 9 West Virginia	W 84–80 ^{OT}	23–3 (11–2)	Allen Fieldhouse (16,300); Lawrence, KS
February 18, 2017; 12:00 PM, CBS	No. 3	at No. 4 Baylor	W 67–65	24–3 (12–2)	Ferrell Center (10,021); Waco, TX
February 22, 2017; 6:00 PM, ESPN2	No. 3	TCU	W 87–68	25–3 (13–2)	Allen Fieldhouse (16,300); Lawrence, KS
January 25, 2017; 5:00 PM, ESPN	No. 3	at Texas	W 77–67	26–3 (14–2)	Frank Erwin Center (14,111); Austin, TX
February 27, 2017; 8:00 PM, ESPN	No. 1	Oklahoma	W 73–63	27–3 (15–2)	Allen Fieldhouse (16,300); Lawrence, KS
March 4, 2017; 5:00 PM, ESPN	No. 1	at Oklahoma State	W 90–85	28–3 (16–2)	Gallagher-Iba Arena (13,611); Stillwater, OK
Big 12 tournament
March 9, 2017; 1:30, ESPN2	No. 1	vs. (8) TCU; Big 12 tournament quarterfinals	L 82–85	28–4	Sprint Center; Kansas City, MO
*Non-conference game. ^{#}Rankings from AP Poll. (#) Tournament seedings in parentheses. All times are in Central Time.

=== Kansas State ===
Kansas State Wildcats Schedule
Date time, TV	Rank^{#}	Opponent^{#}	Result	Record	Site (attendance) city, state
Big 12 Regular season
December 30, 2016; 7:00 pm, ESPNews		Texas	W 65–62	12–1 (1–0)	Bramlage Coliseum (12,528); Manhattan, KS
January 3, 2017; 8:00 pm, ESPN2		at No. 3 Kansas; Sunflower Showdown	L 88–90	12–2 (1–1)	Allen Fieldhouse (16,300); Lawrence, KS
January 7, 2017; 2:00 pm, ESPNews		Oklahoma	W 75–64	13–2 (2–1)	Bramalage Coliseum (12,295); Manhattan, KS
January 10, 2017; 8:15 pm, ESPNews	No. 25	at Texas Tech	L 65–66	13–3 (2–2)	United Supermarkets Arena (8,217); Lubbock, TX
January 14, 2017; 3:30 pm, ESPNU	No. 25	No. 1 Baylor	L 68–77	13–4 (2–3)	Bramlage Coliseum (12,528); Manhattan, KS
January 18, 2017; 8:00 pm, ESPNU		at Oklahoma State	W 96–88	14–4 (3–3)	Gallagher-Iba Arena (6,673); Stillwater, OK
January 21, 2017; 8:00 pm, ESPN2		No. 7 West Virginia	W 79–75	15–4 (4–3)	Bramlage Coliseum (12,528); Manhattan, KS
January 24, 2017; 8:00 pm, ESPNU		at Iowa State	L 65–70	15–5 (4–4)	Hilton Coliseum (14,384); Ames, IA
January 28, 2017*; 1:00 pm, ESPN2		at Tennessee; Big 12/SEC Challenge	L 58–70	15–6	Thompson–Boling Arena (14,398); Knoxville, TN
February 1, 2017; 8:00 pm, ESPNews		TCU	L 80–86	15–7 (4–5)	Bramlage Coliseum (11,103); Manhattan, KS
February 4, 2017; 2:00 pm, ESPNews		at No. 2 Baylor	W 56–54	16–7 (5–5)	Ferrell Center (7,729); Waco, TX
February 8, 2017; 8:00 pm, ESPN		No. 3 Kansas; Sunflower Showdown	L 71–74	16–8 (5–6)	Bramlage Coliseum (12,528); Manhattan, KS
February 11, 2017; 11:00 am, ESPN		at No. 13 West Virginia	L 66–85	16–9 (5–7)	WVU Coliseum (14,074); Morgantown, WV
February 15, 2017; 6:00 pm, ESPN2		Iowa State	L 79–87	16–10 (5–8)	Bramlage Coliseum (11,387); Manhattan, KS
February 18, 2017; 1:00 pm, LHN		at Texas	W 64–61	17–10 (6–8)	Frank Erwin Center (11,318); Austin, TX
February 22, 2017; 8:00 pm, ESPNU		Oklahoma State	L 68–80	17–11 (6–9)	Bramlage Coliseum (11,160); Manhattan, KS
February 25, 2017; 5:00 pm, ESPNU		at Oklahoma	L 51–81	17–12 (6–10)	Lloyd Noble Center (10,181); Norman, OK
March 1, 2017; 8:00 pm, ESPNU		at TCU	W 75–74	18–12 (7–10)	Schollmaier Arena (6,165); Fort Texas, TX
March 4, 2017; 12:00 pm, ESPNews		Texas Tech	W 61–48	19–12 (8–10)	Bramlage Coliseum (12,290); Manhattan, KS
Big 12 tournament
March 9, 2017; 8:00 pm, ESPNU		vs. No. 9 (3) Baylor; Big 12 tournament quarterfinals	W 70–64	20–12	Sprint Center; Kansas City, MO
March 10, 2017; 8:00 pm, ESPN2		vs. No. 11 (2) West Virginia; Big 12 tournament semifinals	L 50–51	20–13	Sprint Center; Kansas City, MO
*Non-conference game. ^{#}Rankings from AP Poll. (#) Tournament seedings in parentheses. All times are in Central Time.

=== Oklahoma ===
Oklahoma Sooners Schedule
Date time, TV	Rank^{#}	Opponent^{#}	Result	Record	Site (attendance) city, state
Big 12 Regular season
December 30, 2016; 6:00 pm, ESPN2		No. 4 Baylor	L 50–76	6–6 (0–1)	Lloyd Noble Center (10,254); Norman, OK
January 3, 2017; 8:00 pm, ESPNU		at TCU	L 57–60	6–7 (0–2)	Schollmaier Arena (5,576); Fort Worth, TX
January 7, 2017; 2:00 pm, ESPNews		at Kansas State	L 65–74	6–8 (0–3)	Bramlage Coliseum (12,295); Manhattan, KS
January 10, 2017; 8:00 pm, ESPN2		No. 2 Kansas	L 70–81	6–9 (0–4)	Lloyd Noble Center (9,788); Norman, OK
January 14, 2017; 7:30 pm, ESPNU		Texas Tech	W 84–75	7–9 (1–4)	Lloyd Noble Center (11,562); Norman, OK
January 18, 2017; 6:00 pm, ESPN2		at No. 7 West Virginia	W 89–87 ^{OT}	8–9 (2–4)	WVU Coliseum (11,895); Morgantown, WV
January 21, 2017; 1:00 pm, ESPN2		Iowa State	L 87–92 ^{2OT}	8–10 (2–5)	Lloyd Noble Center (9,673); Norman, OK
January 23, 2017; 8:00 pm, ESPN		at Texas	L 83–84	8–11 (2–6)	Frank Erwin Center (10,898); Austin, TX
January 28, 2017*; 1:00 pm, ESPN		No. 25 Florida; Big 12/SEC Challenge	L 52–84	8–12	Lloyd Noble Center (10,859); Norman, OK
January 30, 2017; 8:00 pm, ESPN		Oklahoma State; Bedlam Series	L 66–68	8–13 (2–7)	Lloyd Noble Center (10,103); Norman, OK
February 4, 2017; 6:00 pm, ESPNU		at Texas Tech	L 69–77	8–14 (2–8)	United Supermarkets Arena (10,194); Lubbock, TX
February 8, 2017; 8:00 pm, ESPN		No. 13 West Virginia	L 50–61	8–15 (2–9)	Lloyd Noble Center (4,663); Norman, OK
February 11, 2017; 5:00 pm, ESPN2		at Iowa State	L 64–80	8–16 (2–10)	Hilton Coliseum (14,384); Ames, IA
February 14, 2017; 8:00 pm, ESPN2		Texas	W 70–66	9–16 (3–10)	Lloyd Noble Center (7,545); Norman, OK
February 18, 2017; 7:00 pm, ESPNU		at Oklahoma State; Bedlam Series	L 92–96	9–17 (3–11)	Gallagher-Iba Arena (13,611); Stillwater, OK
February 21, 2017; 6:00 pm, ESPN2		at No. 9 Baylor	L 54–60	9–18 (3–12)	Ferrell Center (6,135); Waco, TX
February 25, 2017; 5:00 pm, ESPNU		Kansas State	W 81–51	10–18 (4–12)	Lloyd Noble Center (10,181); Norman, OK
February 27, 2017; 8:00 pm, ESPN		at No. 1 Kansas	L 67–77	10–19 (4–13)	Allen Fieldhouse (16,300); Lawrence, KS
March 4, 2017; 2:00 pm, ESPNews		TCU	W 73–68	11–19 (5–13)	Lloyd Noble Center (9,526); Norman, OK
Big 12 tournament
March 8, 2017; 6:00 pm, ESPNU		vs. (8) TCU; Big 12 tournament 1st round	L 63–82	11–20	Sprint Center; Kansas City, MO
*Non-conference game. ^{#}Rankings from AP Poll. (#) Tournament seedings in parentheses. All times are in Central Time.

=== Oklahoma State ===
Oklahoma State Cowboys Schedule
Date time, TV	Rank^{#}	Opponent^{#}	Result	Record	Site (attendance) city, state
Big 12 Regular season
December 30, 2016; 3:00 pm, ESPN2		No. 11 West Virginia	L 75–92	10–3 (0–1)	Gallagher-Iba Arena (13,611); Stillwater, OK
January 4, 2017; 7:00 pm, LHN		at Texas	L 79–82	10–4 (0–2)	Frank Erwin Center (9,753); Austin, TX
January 7, 2017; 6:00 pm, ESPNews		at No. 2 Baylor	L 57–61	10–5 (0–3)	Ferrell Center (10,627); Waco, TX
January 11, 2017; 8:00 pm, ESPNU		Iowa State	L 86–96	10–6 (0–4)	Gallagher-Iba Arena (6,066); Stillwater, OK
January 14, 2017; 1:00 pm, ESPN2		at No. 2 Kansas	L 80–87	10–7 (0–5)	Allen Fieldhouse (16,300); Lawrence, KS
January 18, 2017; 8:00 pm, ESPNU		Kansas State	L 88–96	10–8 (0–6)	Gallagher-Iba Arena (6,673); Stillwater, OK
January 21, 2017; 1:00 pm, ESPNU		at Texas Tech	W 83–64	11–8 (1–6)	United Supermarkets Arena (11,360); Lubbock, TX
January 23, 2017; 6:00 pm, ESPNU		TCU	W 89–76	12–8 (2–6)	Gallagher-Iba Arena (6,090); Stillwater, OK
January 28, 2017*; 3:00 pm, ESPNU		Arkansas; Big 12/SEC Challenge	W 99–71	13–8	Gallagher-Iba Arena (13,611); Stillwater, OK
January 30, 2017; 8:00 pm, ESPN		at Oklahoma; Bedlam Series	W 68–66	14–8 (3–6)	Lloyd Noble Center (10,103); Norman, OK
February 4, 2017; 4:00 pm, ESPNU		at No. 7 West Virginia	W 82–75	15–8 (4–6)	WVU Coliseum (14,225); Morgantown, WV
February 8, 2017; 6:00 pm, ESPNU		No. 6 Baylor	L 69–72	15–9 (4–7)	Gallagher-Iba Arena (8,170); Stillwater, OK
February 11, 2017; 3:00 pm, ESPN2		Texas	W 84–71	16–9 (5–7)	Gallagher-Iba Arena (8,592); Stillwater, OK
February 15, 2017; 8:00 pm, ESPNU		at TCU	W 71–68	17–9 (6–7)	Schollmaier Arena (6,301); Fort Worth, TX
February 18, 2017; 8:00 pm, ESPNU		Oklahoma; Bedlam Series	W 96–92	18–9 (7–7)	Gallagher-Iba Arena (13,611); Stillwater, OK
February 22, 2017; 8:00 pm, ESPNU		at Kansas State	W 80–68	19–9 (8–7)	Bramlage Coliseum (11,160); Manhattan, KS
February 25, 2017; 1:00 pm, ESPNU		Texas Tech	W 80–63	20–9 (9–7)	Gallagher-Iba Arena (7,835); Stillwater, OK
February 28, 2017; 8:00 pm, ESPN2		at Iowa State	L 83–86	20–10 (9–8)	Hilton Coliseum (14,384); Ames, IA
March 4, 2017; 3:00 pm, ESPN		No. 1 Kansas	L 85–90	20–11 (9–9)	Gallagher-Iba Arena (13,611); Stillwater, OK
Big 12 tournament
March 9, 2017; 11:30 am, ESPN2		vs. No. 23 (4) Iowa State; Big 12 tournament quarterfinals	L 83–92	20–12	Sprint Center; Kansas City, MO
*Non-conference game. ^{#}Rankings from AP Poll. (#) Tournament seedings in parentheses. All times are in Central Time.

=== TCU ===
TCU Horned Frogs Schedule
Date time, TV	Rank^{#}	Opponent^{#}	Result	Record	Site (attendance) city, state
Big 12 Regular season
December 30, 2016; 8:00 pm, ESPN2		No. 3 Kansas	L 80–86	11–2 (0–1)	Schollmaier Arena (6,579); Fort Worth, TX
January 3, 2017; 8:00 pm, ESPNU		Oklahoma	W 60–57	12–2 (1–1)	Schollmaier Arena (5,576); Fort Worth, TX
January 7, 2017; 12:00 pm, ESPNU		at No. 7 West Virginia	L 70–82	12–3 (1–2)	WVU Coliseum (12,568); Morgantown, WV
January 11, 2017; 7:00 pm, LHN		at Texas	W 64–61	13–3 (2–2)	Frank Erwin Center (9,661); Austin, TX
January 14, 2017; 4:30 pm, FSSW		Iowa State	W 84–77	14–3 (3–2)	Schollmaier Arena (6,564); Fort Worth, TX
January 18, 2017; 6:30 pm, FSSW		at Texas Tech	L 69–75	14–4 (3–3)	United Supermarkets Arena (10,052); Lubbock, TX
January 21, 2017; 7:00 pm, ESPNU		No. 6 Baylor	L 53–62	14–5 (3–4)	Schollmaier Arena (7,276); Fort Worth, TX
January 23, 2017; 6:00 pm, ESPNU		at Oklahoma State	L 76–89	14–6 (3–5)	Gallagher-Iba Arena (6,090); Stillwater, OK
January 28, 2017*; 5:00 pm, ESPNU		Auburn; Big 12/SEC Challenge	L 80–88	14–7	Schollmaier Arena (6,874); Fort Worth, TX
February 1, 2017; 6:30 pm, ESPNews		at Kansas State	W 86–80	15–7 (4–5)	Bramlage Coliseum (11,103); Manhattan, KS
February 4, 2017; 12:00 pm, ESPNews		Texas	W 78–63	16–7 (5–5)	Schollmaier Arena (6,507); Fort Worth, TX
February 7, 2017; 8:00 pm, ESPNews		Texas Tech	W 62–61	17–7 (6–5)	Schollmaier Arena (6,468); Fort Worth, TX
February 11, 2017; 1:00 pm, ESPNU		at No. 6 Baylor	L 52–70	17–8 (6–6)	Ferrell Center (7,906); Waco, TX
February 15, 2017; 8:00 pm, ESPNU		Oklahoma State	L 68–71	17–9 (6–7)	Schollmaier Arena (6,301); Fort Worth, TX
February 18, 2017; 5:00 pm, ESPNews		at Iowa State	L 71–84	17–10 (6–8)	Hilton Coliseum (14,384); Ames, IA
February 22, 2017; 6:00 pm, ESPN2		at No. 3 Kansas	L 68–87	17–11 (6–9)	Allen Fieldhouse (16,300); Lawrence, KS
February 25, 2017; 1:00 pm, ESPN		No. 12 West Virginia	L 60–61	17–12 (6–10)	Schollmaier Arena (6,486); Fort Worth, TX
March 1, 2017; 8:00 pm, ESPNU		Kansas State	L 74–75	17–13 (6–11)	Schollmaier Arena (6,165); Fort Worth, TX
March 4, 2017; 2:00 pm, ESPNews		at Oklahoma	L 68–73	17–14 (6–12)	Lloyd Noble Center (9,526); Norman, OK
Big 12 tournament
March 8, 2017; 6:00 pm, ESPNU		vs. (9) Oklahoma; Big 12 tournament 1st round	W 82–63	18–14	Sprint Center; Kansas City, MO
March 9, 2017; 1:30 pm, ESPN2		vs. No. 1 (1) Kansas; Big 12 tournament quarterfinals	W 85–82	19–14	Sprint Center; Kansas City, MO
March 10, 2017; 6:00 pm, ESPN2		vs. No. 23 (4) Iowa State; Big 12 tournament semifinals	L 63–84	19–15	Sprint Center; Kansas City, MO
*Non-conference game. ^{#}Rankings from AP Poll. (#) Tournament seedings in parentheses. All times are in Central Time.

=== Texas ===
Texas Longhorns Schedule
Date time, TV	Rank^{#}	Opponent^{#}	Result	Record	Site (attendance) city, state
Big 12 Regular season
December 30, 2016; 7:00 pm, ESPNews		at Kansas State	L 62–65	6–7 (0–1)	Bramlage Coliseum (12,528); Manhattan, KS
January 4, 2017; 7:00 pm, LHN		Oklahoma State	W 82–79	7–7 (1–1)	Frank Erwin Center (9,753); Austin, TX
January 7, 2017; 8:15 pm, ESPN2		at Iowa State	L 70–79	7–8 (1–2)	Hilton Coliseum (14,684); Ames, IA
January 11, 2017; 7:00 pm, LHN		TCU	L 61–64	7–9 (1–3)	Frank Erwin Center (9,661); Austin, TX
January 14, 2017; 3:00 pm, ESPN2		No. 10 West Virginia	L 72–74	7–10 (1–4)	Frank Erwin Center (10,751); Austin, TX
January 17, 2017; 6:00 pm, ESPN2		at No. 6 Baylor	L 64–74	7–11 (1–5)	Ferrell Center (7,604); Waco, TX
January 21, 2017; 1:00 pm, CBS		at No. 2 Kansas	L 67–79	7–12 (1–6)	Allen Fieldhouse (16,300); Lawrence, KS
January 23, 2017; 8:00 pm, ESPN		Oklahoma	W 84–83	8–12 (2–6)	Frank Erwin Center (10,898); Austin, TX
January 28, 2017*; 3:00 pm, ESPN		at Georgia; Big 12/SEC Challenge	L 57–59	8–13	Stegeman Coliseum (10,029); Athens, GA
February 1, 2017; 8:00 pm, ESPNU		Texas Tech	W 62–58	9–13 (3–6)	Frank Erwin Center (10,644); Austin, TX
February 4, 2017; 12:00 pm, ESPNews		at TCU	L 63–78	9–14 (3–7)	Schollmaier Arena (6,507); Fort Worth, TX
February 7, 2017; 8:00 pm, ESPN2		Iowa State	W 67–65	10–14 (4–7)	Frank Erwin Center (10,048); Austin, TX
February 11, 2017; 3:00 pm, ESPN2		at Oklahoma State	L 71–84	10–15 (4–8)	Gallagher-Iba Arena (8,592); Stillwater, OK
February 14, 2017; 8:00 pm, ESPN2		at Oklahoma	L 66–70	10–16 (4–9)	Lloyd Noble Center (7,545); Norman, OK
February 18, 2017; 1:00 pm, LHN		Kansas State	L 61–64	10–17 (4–10)	Frank Erwin Center (11,318); Austin, TX
February 20, 2017; 8:00 pm, ESPN		at No. 12 West Virginia	L 62–77	10–18 (4–11)	WVU Coliseum (10,460); Morgantown, WV
February 25, 2017; 5:00 pm, ESPN		No. 3 Kansas	L 67–77	10–19 (4–12)	Frank Erwin Center (14,111); Austin, TX
March 1, 2017; 8:00 pm, ESPN2		at Texas Tech	L 57–67	10–20 (4–13)	United Supermarkets Arena (12,643); Lubbock, TX
March 4, 2017; 3:00 pm, ESPN		No. 11 Baylor	L 64–75	10–21 (4–14)	Frank Erwin Center (12,195); Austin, TX
Big 12 tournament
March 8, 2017; 8:00 pm, ESPNU		vs. (7) Texas Tech; Big 12 tournament 1st round	W 61–52	11–21	Sprint Center; Kansas City, MO
March 9, 2017; 6:00 pm, ESPNU		vs. No. 11 (2) West Virginia; Big 12 tournament quarterfinals	L 53–63	11–22	Sprint Center; Kansas City, MO
*Non-conference game. ^{#}Rankings from AP Poll. (#) Tournament seedings in parentheses. All times are in Central Time.

=== Texas Tech ===
Texas Tech Red Raiders Schedule
Date time, TV	Rank^{#}	Opponent^{#}	Result	Record	Site (attendance) city, state
Big 12 Regular season
December 30, 2016; 3:00 pm, ESPNU		at Iowa State	L 56–63	11–2 (0–1)	Hilton Coliseum (14,384); Ames, IA
January 3, 2017; 8:15 pm, ESPNews		No. 7 West Virginia	W 77–76 ^{OT}	12–2 (1–1)	United Supermarkets Arena (10,013); Lubbock, TX
January 7, 2017; 6:15 pm, ESPN2		at No. 3 Kansas	L 68–85	12–3 (1–2)	Allen Fieldhouse (16,300); Lawrence, KS
January 10, 2017; 8:15 pm, ESPNews		No. 25 Kansas State	W 66–65	13–3 (2–2)	United Supermarkets Arena (8,217); Lubbock, TX
January 14, 2017; 7:30 pm, ESPNU		at Oklahoma	L 75–84	13–4 (2–3)	Lloyd Noble Center (11,562); Norman, OK
January 18, 2017; 6:30 pm, FSSW		TCU	W 75–69	14–4 (3–3)	United Supermarkets Arena (10,052); Lubbock, TX
January 21, 2017; 1:00 pm, ESPNU		Oklahoma State	L 64–83	14–5 (3–4)	United Supermarkets Arena (11,360); Lubbock, TX
January 25, 2017; 7:00 pm, ESPNews		at No. 5 Baylor	L 61–65	14–6 (3–5)	Ferrell Center (7,059); Waco, TX
January 28, 2017*; 1:00 pm, ESPNU		LSU; Big 12/SEC Challenge	W 77–64	15–6	United Supermarkets Arena (11,056); Lubbock, TX
February 1, 2017; 8:00 pm, ESPNU		at Texas	L 58–62	15–7 (3–6)	Frank Erwin Center (10,644); Austin, TX
February 4, 2017; 6:00 pm, ESPNU		Oklahoma	W 77–69	16–7 (4–6)	United Supermarkets Arena (10,194); Lubbock, TX
February 7, 2017; 7:00 pm, ESPNews		at TCU	L 61–62	16–8 (4–7)	Schollmaier Arena (6,468); Fort Worth, TX
February 11, 2017; 1:00 pm, ESPN		No. 3 Kansas	L 79–80	16–9 (4–8)	United Supermarkets Arena (13,806); Lubbock, TX
February 13, 2017; 6:00 pm, ESPNU		No. 4 Baylor	W 84–78	17–9 (5–8)	United Supermarkets Arena (9,202); Lubbock, TX
February 18, 2017; 1:00 pm, ESPN2		at No. 9 West Virginia	L 74–83	17–10 (5–9)	WVU Coliseum (14,150); Morgantown, WV
February 20, 2017; 6:00 pm, ESPNU		Iowa State	L 80–82 ^{OT}	17–11 (5–10)	United Supermarkets Arena (8,389); Lubbock, TX
February 25, 2017; 1:00 pm, ESPNU		at Oklahoma State	L 63–80	17–12 (5–11)	Gallagher-Iba Arena (7,835); Stillwater, OK
March 1, 2017; 8:00 pm, ESPN2		Texas	W 67–57	18–12 (6–11)	United Supermarkets Arena (12,643); Lubbock, TX
March 4, 2017; 12:00 pm, ESPNews		at Kansas State	L 48–61	18–13 (6–12)	Bramlage Coliseum (12,290); Manhattan, KS
Big 12 tournament
March 8, 2017; 8:00 pm, ESPNU		vs. (10) Texas; Big 12 tournament 1st round	L 52–61	18–14	Sprint Center; Kansas City, MO
*Non-conference game. ^{#}Rankings from AP Poll. (#) Tournament seedings in parentheses. All times are in Central Time.

=== West Virginia ===
West Virginia Mountaineers Schedule
Date time, TV	Rank^{#}	Opponent^{#}	Result	Record	Site (attendance) city, state
Big 12 Regular season
December 30, 2016; 4:00 pm, ESPN2	No. 11	at Oklahoma State	W 92–75	12–1 (1–0)	Gallagher-Iba Arena (13,611); Stillwater, OK
January 3, 2017; 9:15 pm, ESPNews	No. 7	at Texas Tech	L 76–77 ^{OT}	12–2 (1–1)	United Supermarkets Arena (10,013); Lubbock, TX
January 7, 2017; 1:00 pm, ESPNU	No. 7	TCU	W 82–70	13–2 (2–1)	WVU Coliseum (12,568); Morgantown, WV
January 10, 2017; 7:00 pm, ESPN2	No. 10	No. 1 Baylor	W 89–68	14–2 (3–1)	WVU Coliseum (14,632); Morgantown, WV
January 14, 2017; 4:00 pm, ESPN2	No. 10	at Texas	W 74–72	15–2 (4–1)	Frank Erwin Center (10,751); Austin, TX
January 18, 2017; 7:00 pm, ESPN2	No. 7	Oklahoma	L 87–89 ^{OT}	15–3 (4–2)	WVU Coliseum (11,895); Morgantown, WV
January 21, 2017; 4:00 pm, ESPN2	No. 7	at Kansas State	L 75–79	15–4 (4–3)	Bramlage Coliseum (12,528); Manhattan, KS
January 24, 2017; 7:00 pm, ESPN2	No. 18	No. 2 Kansas	W 85–69	16–4 (5–3)	WVU Coliseum (13,694); Morgantown, WV
January 28, 2017*; 12:00 pm, ESPN	No. 18	Texas A&M; Big 12/SEC Challenge	W 81–77	17–4	WVU Coliseum (12,836); Morgantown, WV
January 31, 2017; 9:00 pm, ESPN2	No. 7	at Iowa State	W 85–72	18–4 (6–3)	Hilton Coliseum (14,384); Ames, IA
February 4, 2017; 5:00 pm, ESPNU	No. 7	Oklahoma State	L 75–82	18–5 (6–4)	WVU Coliseum (14,225); Morgantown, WV
February 8, 2017; 9:00 pm, ESPN2	No. 13	at Oklahoma	W 61–50	19–5 (7–4)	Lloyd Noble Center (4,663); Norman, OK
February 11, 2017; 12:00 pm, ESPN	No. 13	Kansas State	W 85–66	20–5 (8–4)	WVU Coliseum (14,074); Morgantown, WV
February 13, 2017; 9:00 pm, ESPN	No. 9	at No. 3 Kansas	L 80–84 ^{OT}	20–6 (8–5)	Allen Fieldhouse (16,300); Lawrence, KS
February 18, 2017; 2:00 pm, ESPN2	No. 9	Texas Tech	W 83–74 ^{2OT}	21–6 (9–5)	WVU Coliseum (14,150); Morgantown, WV
February 20, 2017; 9:00 pm, ESPN	No. 12	Texas	W 77–62	22–6 (10–5)	WVU Coliseum (10,460); Morgantown, WV
February 25, 2017; 2:00 pm, ESPN	No. 12	at TCU	W 61–60	23–6 (11–5)	Schollmaier Arena (6,486); Fort Worth, TX
February 27, 2017; 7:00 pm, ESPNU	No. 10	at No. 11 Baylor	L 62–71	23–7 (11–6)	Ferrell Center (8,203); Waco, TX
March 3, 2017; 7:00 pm, ESPN2	No. 10	No. 24 Iowa State	W 87–76	24–7 (12–6)	WVU Coliseum (14,528); Morgantown, WV
Big 12 tournament
March 9, 2017; 7:00 pm, ESPNU	No. 11	vs. (10) Texas; Big 12 tournament quarterfinals	W 63–53	25–7	Sprint Center; Kansas City, MO
March 10, 2017; 9:00 pm, ESPN2	No. 11	vs. (6) Kansas State; Big 12 tournament semifinals	W 51–50	26–7	Sprint Center; Kansas City, MO
March 11, 2017; 6:00 pm, ESPN	No. 11	vs. No. 23 (4) Iowa State; Big 12 tournament championship	L 74–80	26–8	Sprint Center; Kansas City, MO
*Non-conference game. ^{#}Rankings from AP Poll. (#) Tournament seedings in parentheses. All times are in Eastern Time.

== Honors and awards ==
=== All-Big 12 awards and teams ===
2016 Big 12 Men's Basketball Individual Awards
Award	Recipient(s)
Player of the Year	Frank Mason III†, G, Kansas
Coach of the Year	Bill Self, Kansas
Defensive Player of the Year	Jevon Carter, G, West Virginia
Sixth Man Award	Tarik Phillip, G, West Virginia
Newcomer of the Year	Manu Lecomte, G, Baylor
Freshman of the Year	Josh Jackson† F, Kansas

2016 Big 12 Men's Basketball All-Conference Teams
First Team	Second Team	Third Team	Defensive Team
Jawun Evans, So., G, Oklahoma State; Josh Jackson, Fr., F, Kansas; Frank Mason III†, Sr., G, Kansas; Monte Morris†, Sr., G, Iowa State; Johnathan Motley†, Jr., F, Baylor	Vladimir Brodziansky, Jr., F, TCU; Jeffrey Carroll, Jr., G/F, Oklahoma State; Jevon Carter Jr., G, West Virginia; Devonte' Graham Jr., G, Kansas; Naz Mitrou-Long, Jr., G, Iowa State	Nathan Adrian, Sr., F, West Virginia; Jarrett Allen, Fr., F, Texas; Deonte Burton, Sr., G, Iowa State; Keenan Evans, Jr., G, Texas Tech; Wesley Iwundu, Sr., F, Kansas State; Manu Lecomte, Jr., G, Baylor	Nathan Adrian, Sr., F, West Virginia; Vladimir Brodziansky, Jr., F, TCU; Jevon Carter, Jr., G, West Virginia; Jo Lual-Acuil, Jr., F, Baylor; Ish Wainright, Sr., G, Baylor
† - denotes unanimous selection

=== Phillips 66 Player of the Week ===
Week	Player of the Week	School	Newcomer of the Week	School	Ref.
Nov. 11–13	Frank Mason III	Kansas	Manu Lecomte	Baylor	
Nov. 11–13	Frank Mason III	Kansas	Jaylen Fisher	TCU	
Nov. 14–20	Monte Morris	Iowa State	Josh Jackson	Kansas	
Nov. 21–27	Johnathan Motley	Baylor	Josh Jackson (2)	Kansas	
Nov. 28 – Dec. 4	Manu Lecomte	Baylor	Anthony Livingston	Texas Tech	
Nov. 28 – Dec. 4	Jawun Evans	Oklahoma State	Anthony Livingston	Texas Tech	
Dec. 5–11	Frank Mason III (2)	Kansas	Brandon Averette	Oklahoma State	
Dec. 12–18	Naz Mitrou-Long	Iowa State	Jo Lual-Acuil Jr.	Baylor	
Dec. 19–25	Josh Jackson	Kansas	Desmond Bane	TCU	
Dec. 26 – Jan. 1	Landen Lucas	Kansas	Manu Lecomte (2)	Baylor	
Jan. 2–8	Johnathan Motley (2)	Baylor	Josh Jackson (3)	Kansas	
Jan. 9–15	Vladimir Brodziansky	TCU	Josh Jackson (4)	Kansas	
Jan. 9–15	Vladimir Brodziansky	TCU	Jarrett Allen	Texas	
Jan. 16–22	Johnathan Motley (3)	Baylor	Jarrett Allen (2)	Texas	
Jan. 23–29	Jawun Evans (2)	Oklahoma State	Josh Jackson (5)	Kansas	
Jan. 30 – Feb. 5	Deonte Burton	Iowa State	Lindy Waters III	Oklahoma State	
Jan. 30 – Feb. 5	Deonte Burton	Iowa State	Alex Robinson	TCU	
Feb. 6–12	Josh Jackson (2)	Kansas	Manu Lecomte (3)	Baylor	
Feb. 13–19	Jawun Evans (3)	Oklahoma State	Josh Jackson (6)	Kansas	
Feb. 20–26	Monte Morris (2)	Iowa State	Josh Jackson (7)	Kansas	
Feb. 27 – Mar. 5	Frank Mason III (3)	Kansas	Kameron McGusty	Oklahoma	

== Postseason ==
=== Big 12 tournament ===
- March 8–11, 2017–Big 12 Conference Basketball Tournament, Sprint Center, Kansas City, MO.

2017 Big 12 men's basketball tournament seeds and results
Seed	School	Conf.	Over.	Tiebreaker	First round March 8	Quarterfinals March 9	Semifinals March 10	Championship March 11
1.	‡† Kansas	16–2	28–4		Bye	#8 TCU		
2.	† West Virginia	12–6	26–8	3–1 vs. BU & ISU	Bye	#10 Texas	#6 Kansas State	#4 Iowa State
3.	† Baylor	12–6	25–7	2–2 vs. WVU & ISU	Bye	#6 Kansas State		
4.	† Iowa State	12–6	23–10	1–3 vs. WVU & BU	Bye	#5 Oklahoma State	#8 TCU	#2 West Virginia
5.	† Oklahoma State	9–9	20–12		Bye	#4 Iowa State		
6.	† Kansas State	8–10	20–13		Bye	#3 Baylor	#2 West Virginia	
7.	Texas Tech	6–12	18–14	1–1 vs. WVU	#10 Texas			
8.	TCU	6–12	19–15	0–2 vs. WVU	#9 Oklahoma	#1 Kansas	#4 Iowa State	
9.	Oklahoma	5–13	11–20		#8 TCU			
10.	Texas	4–14	11–22		#7 Texas Tech	#2 West Virginia		
‡ – Big 12 regular season champions, and tournament No. 1 seed. † – Received a single-bye in the conference tournament. Overall records include all games played in the Big 12 tournament.

==== Bracket ====
First round Wednesday, March 8
8	TCU	82
9	Oklahoma	63
7	Texas Tech	52
10	Texas	61

Quarterfinals; Thursday, March 9
1	Kansas	82
8	TCU	85
4	Iowa State	92
5	Oklahoma State	83
2	West Virginia	63
10	Texas	53
3	Baylor	64
6	Kansas State	70

Semifinals; Friday, March 10
8	TCU	63
4	Iowa State	84
2	West Virginia	51
6	Kansas State	50

Championship; Saturday, March 11
4	Iowa State	80
2	West Virginia	74

=== NCAA tournament ===
Seed	Region	School	First Four	First round	Second round	Sweet 16	Elite Eight	Final Four	Championship
1	Midwest	Kansas	Bye	#16 UC Davis - W, 100–62	#9 Michigan State - W, 90–70	#4 Purdue - W, 98–66	#3 Oregon - L, 60–74		
3	East	Baylor	Bye	#14 New Mexico State - W, 91–73	#11 USC - W, 82–78	#7 South Carolina - L, 50–70			
4	West	West Virginia	Bye	#13 Bucknell - W, 86–80	#5 Notre Dame - W, 83–71	#1 Gonzaga - L, 58–61			
5	Midwest	Iowa State	Bye	#12 Nevada - W, 84–73	#4 Purdue - L, 76–80				
10	South	Oklahoma State	Bye	#7 Michigan - L, 91–92					
11	South	Kansas State	#11 Wake Forest - W, 95–88	#6 Cincinnati - L, 61–75					
	6 Bids	W-L (%):	1–0 1.000	4–2 .667	3–1 .750	1–2 .333	0–1 .000	0–0 –	TOTAL: 9–6 .600

=== NIT ===
Seed	Region	School	First round	Second round	Quarterfinals	Semifinals	Final
4	Iowa	TCU	#5 Fresno State - W, 66–58	#1 Iowa - W, 94–92	#6 Richmond - W, 86–68	#4 UCF - W, 68–53	#6 Georgia Tech - W, 88–56
	1 Bid	W-L (%):	1–0 1.000	1–0 1.000	1–0 1.000	1–0 1.000	TOTAL: 5–0 1.000

== See also ==
- 2016–17 NCAA Division I men's basketball season
- Big 12 Conference
- Big 12/SEC Challenge
