= 2016–17 Texas Tech Red Raiders basketball team =

American college basketball season

2016–17 Texas Tech Red Raiders basketball
- Conference: Big 12 Conference
- Record: 18–14 (6–12 Big 12)
- Head coach: Chris Beard (1st season)
- Assistant coaches: Chris Ogden (1st season); Al Pinkens (1st season); Mark Adams (1st season)
- Home arena: United Supermarkets Arena

2016–17 Big 12 men's basketball standings
	Conf.				Overall
Team	W		L	PCT	W		L	PCT
No. 3 Kansas	16	–	2	.889	31	–	5	.861
No. 13 West Virginia	12	–	6	.667	28	–	9	.757
No. 12 Baylor	12	–	6	.667	27	–	8	.771
No. 16 Iowa State †	12	–	6	.667	24	–	11	.686
Oklahoma State	9	–	9	.500	20	–	13	.606
Kansas State	8	–	10	.444	21	–	14	.600
Texas Tech	6	–	12	.333	18	–	14	.563
TCU	6	–	12	.333	24	–	15	.615
Oklahoma	5	–	13	.278	11	–	20	.355
Texas	4	–	14	.222	11	–	22	.333
† 2017 Big 12 Tournament winner Rankings from AP poll

The 2016–17 Texas Tech Red Raiders basketball team represented Texas Tech University in the 2016–17 NCAA Division I men's basketball season. The Red Raiders were led by first-year coach Chris Beard. They played their home games at the United Supermarkets Arena in Lubbock, Texas as members of the Big 12 Conference. They finished the season 18–14, 6–12 in Big 12 play to finish in a tie for seventh place. They lost in the first round of the Big 12 tournament to Texas.

== Previous season ==
The Red Raiders finished the 2015–16 season 19–13, 9–9 in Big 12 play to finish in seventh place in conference. They lost in the first round of the Big 12 tournament to TCU. They received an at-large bid to the NCAA tournament where they lost in the First Round to Butler.

On April 14, 2016, head coach Tubby Smith left the school to accept the head coaching position at Memphis. The next day, the school hired Chris Beard, the head coach at Little Rock, as head coach.

== Offseason ==
=== Departures ===
Name	Number	Pos.	Height	Weight	Year	Hometown	Notes
Devaugntah Williams	0	G	6'4"	205	Senior	Canton, OH	Graduated
Isaiah Manderson	1	C	6'10"	255	Junior	Bronx, NY	Transferred to South Florida
C. J. Williamson	3	G	6'7"	210	Freshman	Orlando, FL	Transferred to Florida Gulf Coast
Donovan Ham	4	G	6'2"	200	Freshman	Atlanta, GA	Walk-on; transferred to Georgia Highlands College
Toddrick Gotcher	20	G	6'4"	195	Senior	Garland, TX	Graduated
Rokas Ulvydas	21	F	6'11"	240	Junior	Kaunas, Lithuania	Transferred to La Salle
Jordan Jackson	22	G	6'4"	185	Freshman	Houston, TX	Transferred to Midland College

=== Incoming transfers ===
Name	Number	Pos.	Height	Weight	Year	Hometown	Notes
Brandone Francis	1	G	6'6"	214	RS Sophomore	La Romana, Dominican Republic	Transferred from Florida. Under NCAA transfer rules, Francis-Ramirez will not play for the 2016–17 season. Will have three years of remaining eligibility.
Tommy Hamilton IV	3	C	6'11"	255	Senior	Chicago, IL	Transferred from DePaul. Under NCAA transfer rules, Hamilton IV will not play for the 2016–17 season. Will have one year of remaining eligibility.
Shandell Millinghaus	4	G	6'2"	210	Junior	Brooklyn, NY	Junior college transferred from Northwest Florida State College
Niem Stevenson	10	G	6'6"	230	Junior	Irving, TX	Junior college transferred from Seward County Community College
Anthony Livingston	21	F	6'9"	226	Senior	Washington, D.C.	Transferred from Arkansas State. Will be eligible to play immediately since Livingston graduated from Arkansas State.
Giovanni McLean	23	G	6'2"	202	RS Senior	Bronx, NY	Transferred from Quinnipiac. Will be eligible to play immediately since McLean graduated from Quinnipiac.

== Recruits ==
Texas Tech did not have any incoming players in the 2017 recruiting class.

== Roster ==
2016–17 Texas Tech Red Raiders men's basketball team
Players
Coaches

Pos.	#	Name	Height	Weight	Year	Previous school	Hometown
G	1	Brandone Francis (I)	6 ft 5 in (1.96 m)	210 lb (95 kg)	RS So	Arlington Country Day; Florida	La Romana, DR
G	2	Devon Thomas	6 ft 0 in (1.83 m)	175 lb (79 kg)	Sr	Kimball Union Academy; Cloud County CC	Silver Springs, MD
C	3	Tommy Hamilton IV	6 ft 11 in (2.11 m)	260 lb (118 kg)	Sr	IMG Academy; DePaul	Chicago, IL
G	4	Shandell Millinghaus	6 ft 2 in (1.88 m)	195 lb (88 kg)	Jr	Believe Prep Academy; NW Florida State	Brooklyn, NY
F	5	Justin Gray	6 ft 6 in (1.98 m)	210 lb (95 kg)	Jr	Berkeley Prep	Tampa, FL
G	10	Niem Stevenson	6 ft 5 in (1.96 m)	205 lb (93 kg)	Jr	Ranchview	Irving, TX
F	11	Zach Smith	6 ft 8 in (2.03 m)	220 lb (100 kg)	Jr	Plano East	Plano, TX
G	12	Keenan Evans	6 ft 3 in (1.91 m)	185 lb (84 kg)	Jr	Berkner	Richardson, TX
F	15	Aaron Ross	6 ft 8 in (2.03 m)	215 lb (98 kg)	RS Sr	Parkview	North Little Rock, AR
F	21	Anthony Livingston	6 ft 8 in (2.03 m)	220 lb (100 kg)	Sr	Stevens Prep; Arkansas State	Washington, D.C.
F	22	Thomas Brandsma	6 ft 5 in (1.96 m)	220 lb (100 kg)	Sr	Colleyville Heritage; Little Rock Trojans	Colleyville, TX
G	23	Giovanni Mclean	6 ft 0 in (1.83 m)	190 lb (86 kg)	Sr	Bronx Regional; Quinnipiac	Bronx, NY
G	30	Andrew Sorrells (W)	6 ft 3 in (1.91 m)	170 lb (77 kg)	So	Birdville	North Richland Hills, TX
C	32	Norense Odiase	6 ft 9 in (2.06 m)	255 lb (116 kg)	Jr	North Crowley	Crowley, TX
F	34	Matthew Temple	6 ft 10 in (2.08 m)	240 lb (109 kg)	Sr	Rider	Wichita Falls, TX
F	44	John Brown (W)	6 ft 10 in (2.08 m)	240 lb (109 kg)	Fr	Magnolia	Magnolia, TX

Head coach

- Chris Beard (Texas)

Assistant coach(es)

- Mark Adams (Texas Tech)
- Chris Ogden (Texas)
- Al Pinkens (NC State)

Legend

- (C) Team captain
- (S) Suspended
- (I) Ineligible
- (W) Walk-on
- Injured
- Current redshirt

Roster

== Schedule ==
Date time, TV	Rank^{#}	Opponent^{#}	Result	Record	High points	High rebounds	High assists	Site (attendance) city, state
Exhibition
11/04/2016*; 7:30 pm		Missouri Western State	W 92–40		20 – Livingston	Smith – 9	6 – Evans	United Supermarkets Arena (9,642); Lubbock, TX
Regular season
11/11/2016*; 6:30 pm, FCS		Houston Baptist	W 93–67	1–0	28 – Evans	5 – 5 tied	3 – 3 tied	United Supermarkets Arena (10,989); Lubbock, TX
11/15/2016*; 6:30 pm, FSSW+		North Texas	W 70–43	2–0	13 – Ross	11 – Smith	3 – 3 tied	United Supermarkets Arena (9,534); Lubbock, TX
11/19/2016*; 1:00 pm, FSSW		Eastern Kentucky; Cancún Challenge Regional Round	W 90–71	3–0	20 – Millinghaus	7 – Millinghaus	5 – Thomas	United Supermarkets Arena (5,898); Lubbock, TX
11/22/2016*; 5:00 pm, CBSSN		vs. Auburn; Cancún Challenge semifinals	L 65–67	3–1	17 – Ross	10 – Smith	2 – 3 tied	Hard Rock Hotel Riviera Maya (1,610); Cancún, Mexico
11/23/2016*; 5:00 pm, CBSSN		vs. Utah State; Cancún Challenge 3rd place game	W 75–51	4–1	28 – Livingston	9 – Livingston	5 – Thomas	Hard Rock Hotel Riviera Maya (1,610); Cancún, Mexico
11/25/2016*; 2:00 pm, FSSW		Idaho State; Cancún Challenge Regional Round	W 91–58	5–1	16 – Evans	11 – Smith	5 – Evans	United Supermarkets Arena (5,964); Lubbock, TX
11/30/2016*; 6:30 pm, FCS		Incarnate Word	W 69–48	6–1	14 – Tied	6 – Tied	5 – Evans	United Supermarkets Arena (8,878); Lubbock, TX
12/03/2016*; 1:00 pm, FSSW		Rice	W 85–84	7–1	33 – Livingston	7 – Livingston	4 – Millinghaus	United Supermarkets Arena (10,452); Lubbock, TX
12/07/2016*; 8:00 pm, FSSW+		UTSA	W 87–50	8–1	16 – Tied	6 – Tied	6 – Thomas	United Supermarkets Arena (10,008); Lubbock, TX
12/14/2016*; 8:00 pm, FSSW+		Nicholls State	W 89–46	9–1	23 – Evans	11 – Gray	4 – Evans	United Supermarkets Arena (9,242); Lubbock, TX
12/17/2016*; 11:00 am, ESPNU		at Richmond	W 79–72	10–1	17 – Tied	10 – Smith	5 – Evans	Robins Center (6,703); Richmond, VA
12/21/2016*; 4:00 pm, FSSW		Longwood	W 91–60	11–1	19 – Livingston	12 – Smith	6 – Livingston	United Supermarkets Arena (9,057); Lubbock, TX
12/30/2016; 3:00 pm, ESPNU		at Iowa State	L 56–63	11–2 (0–1)	13 – Livingston	14 – Smith	1 – Tied	Hilton Coliseum (14,384); Ames, IA
01/03/2017; 8:15 pm, ESPNews		No. 7 West Virginia	W 77–76 ^{OT}	12–2 (1–1)	15 – Smith	8 – Stevenson	4 – Smith	United Supermarkets Arena (10,013); Lubbock, TX
01/07/2017; 6:15 pm, ESPN2		at No. 3 Kansas	L 68–85	12–3 (1–2)	17 – Tied	7 – Smith	5 – Evans	Allen Fieldhouse (16,300); Lawrence, KS
01/10/2017; 8:15 pm, ESPNews		No. 25 Kansas State	W 66–65	13–3 (2–2)	18 – Evans	7 – Smith	5 – Thomas	United Supermarkets Arena (8,217); Lubbock, TX
01/14/2017; 7:30 pm, ESPNU		at Oklahoma	L 75–84	13–4 (2–3)	16 – Tied	8 – Smith	4 – Thomas	Lloyd Noble Center (8,601); Norman, OK
01/18/2017; 6:30 pm, FSSW		TCU	W 75–69	14–4 (3–3)	20 – Evans	7 – Smith	3 – Tied	United Supermarkets Arena (10,052); Lubbock, TX
01/21/2017; 1:00 pm, ESPNU		Oklahoma State	L 64–83	14–5 (3–4)	15 – Evans	9 – Gray	3 – Evans	United Supermarkets Arena (11,360); Lubbock, TX
01/25/2017; 7:00 pm, ESPNews		at No. 5 Baylor	L 61–65	14–6 (3–5)	14 – Ross	4 – Gray	3 – Evans	Ferrell Center (7,059); Waco, TX
01/28/2017*; 1:00 pm, ESPNU		LSU; Big 12/SEC Challenge	W 77–64	15–6	25 – Smith	8 – Smith	5 – Gray	United Supermarkets Arena (11,056); Lubbock, TX
02/01/2017; 8:00 pm, ESPNU		at Texas	L 58–62	15–7 (3–6)	15 – Evans	13 – Smith	3 – Gray	Frank Erwin Center (10,644); Austin, TX
02/04/2017; 6:00 pm, ESPNU		Oklahoma	W 77–69	16–7 (4–6)	18 – Ross	9 – Smith	3 – Tied	United Supermarkets Arena (10,194); Lubbock, TX
02/07/2017; 7:00 pm, ESPNews		at TCU	L 61–62	16–8 (4–7)	20 – Evans	10 – Smith	5 – Ross	Schollmaier Arena (6,468); Fort Worth, TX
02/11/2017; 1:00 pm, ESPN		No. 3 Kansas	L 79–80	16–9 (4–8)	25 – Evans	10 – Tied	3 – Stevenson	United Supermarkets Arena (13,806); Lubbock, TX
02/13/2017; 6:00 pm, ESPNU		No. 4 Baylor	W 84–78	17–9 (5–8)	23 – Evans	10 – Gray	5 – Stevenson	United Supermarkets Arena (9,202); Lubbock, TX
02/18/2017; 1:00 pm, ESPN2		at No. 9 West Virginia	L 74–83	17–10 (5–9)	28 – Evans	6 – Tied	4 – Evans	WVU Coliseum (14,150); Morgantown, WV
02/20/2017; 6:00 pm, ESPNU		Iowa State	L 80–82 ^{OT}	17–11 (5–10)	17 – Stevenson	10 – Smith	4 – Evans	United Supermarkets Arena (8,389); Lubbock, TX
02/25/2017; 1:00 pm, ESPNU		at Oklahoma State	L 63–80	17–12 (5–11)	18 – Evans	11 – Gray	3 – Evans	Gallagher-Iba Arena (7,835); Stillwater, OK
03/01/2017; 8:00 pm, ESPN2		Texas	W 67–57	18–12 (6–11)	18 – Evans	9 – Stevenson	3 – Evans	United Supermarkets Arena (12,643); Lubbock, TX
03/04/2017; 12:00 pm, ESPNews		at Kansas State	L 48–61	18–13 (6–12)	11 – Stevenson	6 – Smith	2 – Smith	Bramlage Coliseum (12,290); Manhattan, KS
Big 12 Tournament
03/08/2017; 8:30, ESPNU	(7)	vs. (10) Texas; First round	L 52–61	18–14	11 – Evans	8 – Stevenson	2 – Evans	Sprint Center (18,972); Kansas City, MO
*Non-conference game. ^{#}Rankings from AP Poll. (#) Tournament seedings in parentheses. All times are in Central Time.
