= 2016–17 Kansas State Wildcats men's basketball team =

American college basketball season

2016–17 Kansas State Wildcats men's basketball

NCAA tournament, First Round
- Conference: Big 12 Conference
- Record: 21–14 (8–10 Big 12)
- Head coach: Bruce Weber (5th season)
- Assistant coaches: Chris Lowery; Chester Frazier; Brad Korn
- Home arena: Bramlage Coliseum (12,528)

2016–17 Big 12 men's basketball standings
	Conf.				Overall
Team	W		L	PCT	W		L	PCT
No. 3 Kansas	16	–	2	.889	31	–	5	.861
No. 13 West Virginia	12	–	6	.667	28	–	9	.757
No. 12 Baylor	12	–	6	.667	27	–	8	.771
No. 16 Iowa State †	12	–	6	.667	24	–	11	.686
Oklahoma State	9	–	9	.500	20	–	13	.606
Kansas State	8	–	10	.444	21	–	14	.600
Texas Tech	6	–	12	.333	18	–	14	.563
TCU	6	–	12	.333	24	–	15	.615
Oklahoma	5	–	13	.278	11	–	20	.355
Texas	4	–	14	.222	11	–	22	.333
† 2017 Big 12 Tournament winner Rankings from AP poll

The 2016–17 Kansas State Wildcats men's basketball team represented Kansas State University in the 2016–17 NCAA Division I men's basketball season. Their head coach was Bruce Weber in his fifth year at the helm of the Wildcats. The team played its home games in Bramlage Coliseum in Manhattan, its home court since 1988. They were a member of the Big 12 Conference. They finished the season 21–14, 8–10 in Big 12 play to finish in sixth place. They defeated Baylor in the quarterfinals of the Big 12 tournament to advance to the semifinals where they lost to West Virginia. They received an at-large bid to the NCAA tournament where they defeated Wake Forest in the First Four to advance to the First Round where they lost to Cincinnati.

== Preseason ==
The Wildcats finished the 2015–16 season 17–16, 5–13 in Big 12 play to finish in eighth place. They defeated Oklahoma State in the first round of the Big 12 tournament to advance to the quarterfinals where they lost to Kansas.

== Departures ==
Name	Number	Pos.	Height	Weight	Year	Hometown	Notes
Justin Edwards	14	G	6'4"	200	RS Senior	Whitby, ON	Graduated
Brandon Bolden	21	C	6'11"	215	RS Junior	Sumter, SC	Retired from basketball due to a wrist injury
Ron Freeman	23	G	6'5"	185	Freshman	Los Angeles, CA	Transferred to Northwest Florida State College
Brian Rohleder	33	G	6'3"	215	RS Senior	Wichita, KS	Graduated
Stephen Hurt	41	F	6'11"	265	Senior	Murfreesboro, TN	Graduated

== Class of 2016 recruits ==
College recruiting information
Name	Hometown	School	Height	Weight	Commit date
Xavier Sneed #26 SF	St. Louis, MO	Hazelwood Central High School	6 ft 5 in (1.96 m)	190 lb (86 kg)	Sep 28, 2015
Xavier Sneed #26 SF	Recruit ratings: Scout: Rivals: 247Sports: ESPN:				
James Love; PF	Miramar, FL	American Heritage High School	6 ft 10 in (2.08 m)	220 lb (100 kg)	Nov 2, 2015
James Love; PF	Recruit ratings: Scout: Rivals: 247Sports: ESPN:				
Cartier Diarra; SG	Florence, SC	West Florence High School	6 ft 3 in (1.91 m)	185 lb (84 kg)	Feb 5, 2016
Cartier Diarra; SG	Recruit ratings: Scout: Rivals: 247Sports: ESPN:				
Brian Patrick; SG	Fort Lauderdale, FL	Boyd Anderson High School	6 ft 5 in (1.96 m)	180 lb (82 kg)	
Brian Patrick; SG	Recruit ratings: Scout: Rivals: 247Sports: ESPN:				
Overall recruit ranking: Scout: Not Ranked Top 20 Rivals: Not Ranked Top 25 ESPN: Not Ranked Top 25
Note: In many cases, Scout, Rivals, 247Sports, On3, and ESPN may conflict in their listings of height and weight.; In these cases, the average was taken. ESPN grades are on a 100-point scale.; Sources: "2016 Kansas State Basketball Commits". Rivals.; "2016 Kansas State Basketball Commits". Scout.; "2016 Kansas State Basketball Commits". ESPN.; "Scout.com Team Recruiting Rankings". Scout.; "2016 Team Ranking". Rivals.

== Roster ==
2016–17 Kansas State Wildcats men's basketball team
Players
Coaches

Pos.	#	Name	Height	Weight	Year	Previous school	Hometown
G	1	Carlbe Ervin II	6 ft 3 in (1.91 m)	202 lb (92 kg)	Sr	Connors State College	Oklahoma City, Oklahoma
PG	2	Cartier Diarra (injured) (redshirt)	6 ft 4 in (1.93 m)	180 lb (82 kg)	Fr	West Florence High School	Florence, South Carolina
G	3	Kamau Stokes	6 ft 0 in (1.83 m)	165 lb (75 kg)	So	Fork Union Military Academy	Baltimore, Maryland
F	4	D. J. Johnson	6 ft 9 in (2.06 m)	237 lb (108 kg)	RS Sr	Parkway North High School	St. Louis, Missouri
G	5	Barry Brown Jr.	6 ft 3 in (1.91 m)	195 lb (88 kg)	So	Gibbs High School	St. Petersburg, Florida
F	10	Isaiah Maurice	6 ft 10 in (2.08 m)	225 lb (102 kg)	RS Fr	Bull City Prep Academy	Durham, North Carolina
G	11	Brian Patrick	6 ft 5 in (1.96 m)	200 lb (91 kg)	RS Fr	Boyd H. Anderson High School	Fort Lauderdale, Florida
G	12	Mason Schoen (W)	6 ft 1 in (1.85 m)	180 lb (82 kg)	RS Jr	Blue Valley Northwest High School	Overland Park, Kansas
G	13	Zach Winter (W)	6 ft 3 in (1.91 m)	208 lb (94 kg)	Sr	Hutchinson Community College	Andover, Kansas
F	20	Xavier Sneed	6 ft 5 in (1.96 m)	210 lb (95 kg)	Fr	Hazelwood Central High School	Florissant, Missouri
F	21	James Love III	6 ft 10 in (2.08 m)	230 lb (104 kg)	Fr	American Heritage School	Fort Lauderdale, Florida
F	24	Pierson McAtee (W)	6 ft 6 in (1.98 m)	200 lb (91 kg)	RS Fr	Manhattan High School	Manhattan, Kansas
F	25	Wesley Iwundu	6 ft 7 in (2.01 m)	205 lb (93 kg)	Sr	Westfield High School	Houston, Texas
F	32	Dean Wade	6 ft 10 in (2.08 m)	230 lb (104 kg)	So	St. John High School	St. John, Kansas
F	35	Austin Budke (W)	6 ft 6 in (1.98 m)	227 lb (103 kg)	Sr	Hutchinson Community College	Beloit, Kansas
G	45	Kade Kinnamon (W)	6 ft 0 in (1.83 m)	180 lb (82 kg)	So	St. John High School	St. John, Kansas

Head coach

- Bruce Weber (Wisconsin–Milwaukee)

Assistant coach(es)

- Chris Lowery (Southern Illinois)
- Chester Frazier (Illinois)
- Brad Korn (Southern Illinois)

Legend

- (C) Team captain
- (S) Suspended
- (I) Ineligible
- (W) Walk-on
- Injured
- Current redshirt

Roster

== Schedule and results ==
Date time, TV	Rank^{#}	Opponent^{#}	Result	Record	High points	High rebounds	High assists	Site (attendance) city, state
Exhibition
10/28/2016*; 7:00 pm, FSKC		Pittsburg State	W 85–72		17 – Brown	7 – Tied	4 – Tied	Bramlage Coliseum (11,363); Manhattan, KS
11/04/2016*; 8:00 pm, FSKC		Washburn	W 73–58		21 – Iwundu	11 – Iwundu	3 – Tied	Bramlage Coliseum (12,028); Manhattan, KS
Regular season
11/11/2016*; 8:00 pm, FSKC		Western Illinois	W 82–55	1–0	18 – Brown	12 – Johnson	5 – Stokes	Bramlage Coliseum (11,644); Manhattan, KS
11/15/2016*; 7:00 pm, FSKC		Omaha	W 81–68	2–0	15 – Brown	9 – Ervin II	8 – Ervin II	Bramlage Coliseum (10,751); Manhattan, KS
11/20/2016*; 5:00 pm, FSKC		Hampton; Barclays Center Classic	W 89–67	3–0	23 – Iwundu	8 – Wade	3 – Iwundu	Bramlage Coliseum (11,316); Manhattan, KS
11/22/2016*; 7:00 pm, FSKC		Robert Morris (PA); Barclays Center Classic	W 61–40	4–0	13 – Wade	9 – Wade	5 – Iwundu	Bramlage Coliseum (11,010); Manhattan, KS
11/25/2016*; 6:00 pm, ASN		vs. Boston College; Barclays Center Classic semifinals	W 72–54	5–0	16 – Sneed	8 – Tied	6 – Stokes	Barclays Center; Brooklyn, NY
11/26/2016*; 8:30 pm, ASN		vs. Maryland; Barclays Center Classic championship game	L 68–69	5–1	26 – Johnson	11 – Iwundu	3 – Tied	Barclays Center (5,011); Brooklyn, NY
11/30/2016*; 7:00 pm, FSKC		Green Bay	W 80–61	6–1	18 – Brown	8 – Wade	5 – Iwundu	Bramlage Coliseum (10,769); Manhattan, KS
12/03/2016*; 7:00 pm, FSMW+		at Saint Louis	W 84–53	7–1	21 – Johnson	10 – Johnson	7 – Stokes	Chaifetz Arena (7,618); St. Louis, MO
12/06/2016*; 7:00 pm, FSKC		Prairie View A&M	W 74–55	8–1	19 – Wade	9 – Wade	5 – Tied	Bramlage Coliseum (10,865); Manhattan, KS
12/10/2016*; 7:00 pm, FSKC		vs. Washington State; Wildcat Classic	W 70–56	9–1	15 – Iwundu	10 – Johnson	5 – Iwundu	Sprint Center (8,807); Kansas City, MO
12/17/2016*; 2:00 pm, CBSSN		vs. Colorado State; Denver Showcase	W 89–70	10–1	19 – Johnson	10 – Johnson	8 – Stokes	Pepsi Center (7,318); Denver, CO
12/21/2016*; 7:00 pm, FSKC		Gardner–Webb	W 67–54	11–1	18 – Stokes	8 – Wade	5 – Brown	Bramlage Coliseum (11,602); Manhattan, KS
12/30/2016; 7:00 pm, ESPNews		Texas	W 65–62	12–1 (1–0)	18 – Wade	7 – Tied	6 – Stokes	Bramlage Coliseum (12,528); Manhattan, KS
01/03/2017; 8:00 pm, ESPN2		at No. 3 Kansas; Sunflower Showdown	L 88–90	12–2 (1–1)	20 – Wade	7 – Iwundu	7 – Stokes	Allen Fieldhouse (16,300); Lawrence, KS
01/07/2017; 2:00 pm, ESPNews		Oklahoma	W 75–64	13–2 (2–1)	16 – Iwundu	7 – Wade	5 – Tied	Bramalage Coliseum (12,295); Manhattan, KS
01/10/2017; 8:15 pm, ESPNews	No. 25	at Texas Tech	L 65–66	13–3 (2–2)	17 – Stokes	7 – Johnson	5 – Stokes	United Supermarkets Arena (8,217); Lubbock, TX
01/14/2017; 3:30 pm, ESPNU	No. 25	No. 1 Baylor	L 68–77	13–4 (2–3)	20 – Johnson	5 – Tied	6 – Iwundu	Bramlage Coliseum (12,528); Manhattan, KS
01/18/2017; 8:00 pm, ESPNU		at Oklahoma State	W 96–88	14–4 (3–3)	22 – Brown	8 – Iwundu	8 – Iwundu	Gallagher-Iba Arena (6,673); Stillwater, OK
01/21/2017; 8:00 pm, ESPNU		No. 7 West Virginia	W 79–75	15–4 (4–3)	15 – Tied	9 – Iwundu	3 – 3 tied	Bramlage Coliseum (12,528); Manhattan, KS
01/24/2017; 8:00 pm, ESPNU		at Iowa State	L 65–70	15–5 (4–4)	15 – Iwundu	8 – Brown	3 – Tied	Hilton Coliseum (14,384); Ames, IA
01/28/2017*; 1:00 pm, ESPN2		at Tennessee; Big 12/SEC Challenge	L 58–70	15–6 (4–4)	17 – Brown	9 – Johnson	4 – Brown	Thompson–Boling Arena (14,398); Knoxville, TN
02/01/2017; 8:00 pm, ESPNews		TCU	L 80–86 ^{OT}	15–7 (4–5)	21 – Stokes	5 – Tied	7 – Stokes	Bramlage Coliseum (11,103); Manhattan, KS
02/04/2017; 2:00 pm, ESPNews		at No. 2 Baylor	W 56–54	16–7 (5–5)	15 – Stokes	8 – Iwundu	5 – Iwundu	Ferrell Center (7,729); Waco, TX
02/08/2017; 8:00 pm, ESPN		No. 3 Kansas; Sunflower Showdown	L 71–74	16–8 (5–6)	20 – Wade	11 – Iwundu	4 – Wade	Bramlage Coliseum (12,528); Manhattan, KS
02/11/2017; 11:00 am, ESPN		at No. 13 West Virginia	L 66–85	16–9 (5–7)	14 – Iwundu	8 – Tied	3 – Brown	WVU Coliseum (14,074); Morgantown, WV
02/15/2017; 6:00 pm, ESPN2		Iowa State	L 79–87	16–10 (5–8)	21 – Brown	13 – Iwundu	4 – Tied	Bramlage Coliseum (11,387); Manhattan, KS
02/18/2017; 1:00 pm, LHN		at Texas	W 64–61	17–10 (6–8)	16 – Iwundu	7 – Iwundu	4 – Iwundu	Frank Erwin Center (11,318); Austin, TX
02/22/2017; 8:00 pm, ESPNU		Oklahoma State	L 68–80	17–11 (6–9)	21 – Iwundu	9 – Iwundu	4 – Wade	Bramlage Coliseum (11,160); Manhattan, KS
02/25/2017; 5:00 pm, ESPNU		at Oklahoma	L 51–81	17–12 (6–10)	11 – Maurice	8 – Johnson	2 – Iwundu	Lloyd Noble Center (10,181); Norman, OK
03/01/2017; 8:00 pm, ESPNU		at TCU	W 75–74	18–12 (7–10)	20 – Wade	10 – Iwundu	7 – Stokes	Schollmaier Arena (6,165); Fort Texas, TX
03/04/2017; 12:00 pm, ESPNews		Texas Tech	W 61–48	19–12 (8–10)	19 – Johnson	10 – Iwundu	7 – Stokes	Bramlage Coliseum (12,290); Manhattan, KS
Big 12 tournament
03/09/2017; 8:00 pm, ESPNU	(6)	vs. (3) No. 9 Baylor; Quarterfinals	W 70–64	20–12	21 – Brown	7 – Johnson	5 – Stokes	Sprint Center (18,972); Kansas City, MO
03/10/2017; 6:00 pm, ESPN2	(6)	vs. (2) No. 11 West Virginia; Semifinals	L 50–51	20–13	13 – Iwundu	6 – Tied	3 – Stokes	Sprint Center (18,972); Kansas City, MO
NCAA tournament
03/14/2017*; 8:10 pm, truTV	(11 S)	vs. (11 S) Wake Forest; First Four	W 95–88	21–13	27 – Iwundu	6 – Tied	7 – Iwundu	UD Arena (11,855); Dayton, OH
03/17/2017*; 6: 27 PM, truTV	(11 S)	vs. (6 S) No. 18 Cincinnati; First Round	L 61–75	21–14	19 – Iwundu	4 – Iwundu	3 – Iwundu	Golden 1 Center (16,514); Sacramento, CA
*Non-conference game. ^{#}Rankings from AP Poll. (#) Tournament seedings in parentheses. S=South Region. All times are in Central Time.

== Rankings ==
Ranking movements Legend: ██ Increase in ranking ██ Decrease in ranking — = Not ranked RV = Received votes
	Week																			
Poll	Pre	1	2	3	4	5	6	7	8	9	10	11	12	13	14	15	16	17	18	Final
AP	—	—	—	—	—	RV	RV	—	RV	25	—	RV	—	RV	—	—	—	—	—	Not released
Coaches	—	—	—	—	—	—	—	—	RV	RV	RV	RV	RV	RV	RV	RV	—	—	—	—

*AP does not release post-NCAA tournament rankings

== See also ==
- 2016–17 Kansas State Wildcats women's basketball team
