= 2016–17 Texas Longhorns men's basketball team =

American college basketball season

2016–17 Texas Longhorns men's basketball
- Conference: Big 12 Conference
- Record: 11–22 (4–14 Big 12)
- Head coach: Shaka Smart (2nd season)
- Assistant coaches: David Cason; Darrin Horn; Jai Lucas
- Home arena: Frank Erwin Center

2016–17 Big 12 men's basketball standings
	Conf.				Overall
Team	W		L	PCT	W		L	PCT
No. 3 Kansas	16	–	2	.889	31	–	5	.861
No. 13 West Virginia	12	–	6	.667	28	–	9	.757
No. 12 Baylor	12	–	6	.667	27	–	8	.771
No. 16 Iowa State †	12	–	6	.667	24	–	11	.686
Oklahoma State	9	–	9	.500	20	–	13	.606
Kansas State	8	–	10	.444	21	–	14	.600
Texas Tech	6	–	12	.333	18	–	14	.563
TCU	6	–	12	.333	24	–	15	.615
Oklahoma	5	–	13	.278	11	–	20	.355
Texas	4	–	14	.222	11	–	22	.333
† 2017 Big 12 Tournament winner Rankings from AP poll

The 2016–17 Texas Longhorns men's basketball team represented the University of Texas at Austin in the 2016–17 NCAA Division I men's basketball season. They were led by second-year head coach Shaka Smart and played their home games at the Frank Erwin Center in Austin, Texas as members of the Big 12 Conference. They finished the season 11–22, 4–14 in Big 12 play to finish in last place. They defeated Texas Tech in the first round of the Big 12 tournament to advance to the quarterfinals, where they lost to West Virginia.

== Previous season ==
The Longhorns finished the 2015–16 season 20–13, 11–7 in Big 12 play to finish in fourth place in the conference. They lost in the quarterfinals of the Big 12 tournament to Baylor. They received an at-large bid to the NCAA tournament, where they lost in the first round to Northern Iowa on a buzzer beater.

== Departures ==
Name	Number	Pos.	Height	Weight	Year	Hometown	Reason for departure
Isaiah Taylor	1	G	6'1"	185	Junior	Hayward, CA	Declare for 2016 NBA draft
Demarcus Holland	2	G	6'3"	190	Senior	Garland, TX	Graduated
Javan Felix	3	G	5'11"	205	Senior	New Orleans, LA	Graduated
Danny Newsome	4	F	6'10"	190	RS Junior	Houston, TX	Walk-on; did not return
Connor Lammert	21	F	6'10"	235	Senior	San Antonio, TX	Graduated
Prince Ibeh	44	C	6'11"	265	Senior	Garland, TX	Graduated
Cameron Ridley	55	C	6'10"	290	Senior	Richmond, TX	Graduated

=== Incoming transfers ===
Name	Number	Pos.	Height	Weight	Year	Hometown	Notes
Isaiah Hobbs	2	G	6'3"	185	Junior	Palm Beach, FL	• Transferred from Howard College. • Was eligible to play immediately since he was a junior college transfer.
Mareik Isom	14	F	6'9"	215	RS Senior	Austin, TX	• Transferred from Little Rock. • Was eligible to play immediately since he graduated from Little Rock.
Dylan Osetkowski	21	C	6'9"	255	Junior	San Juan Capistrano, CA	• Transferred from Tulane. • Under NCAA transfer rules, Osetkowski had to sit out for the 2016–17 season. Had two years of remaining eligibility.

== Recruiting ==
College recruiting
Name	Hometown	School	Height	Weight	Commit date
Jacob Young; SG	Houston, TX	Yates High School	6 ft 0 in (1.83 m)	165 lb (75 kg)	Jun 30, 2015
Jacob Young; SG	Recruit ratings: Scout: Rivals: 247Sports: ESPN:				
James Banks III; C	Atlanta, GA	La Lumiere School	6 ft 10 in (2.08 m)	230 lb (100 kg)	Oct 8, 2015
James Banks III; C	Recruit ratings: Scout: Rivals: 247Sports: ESPN:				
Andrew Jones; SG	Irving, TX	MacArthur High School	6 ft 4 in (1.93 m)	183 lb (83 kg)	Dec 14, 2015
Andrew Jones; SG	Recruit ratings: Scout: Rivals: 247Sports: ESPN:				
Jarrett Allen; C	Austin, TX	Saint Stephen's Episcopal School	6 ft 10 in (2.08 m)	215 lb (98 kg)	Jun 3, 2016
Jarrett Allen; C	Recruit ratings: Scout: Rivals: 247Sports: ESPN:				
Overall recruit ranking: Scout: 6 Rivals: 16 ESPN: 11
Note: In many cases, Scout, Rivals, 247Sports, On3, and ESPN may conflict in their listings of height and weight.; In these cases, the average was taken. ESPN grades are on a 100-point scale.; Sources: "2016 Texas Basketball Commitment List". Rivals.; "2016 Texas Basketball Recruiting Prospects". Scout.; "2016 Player Commits". ESPN.; "Scout.com Team Recruiting Rankings". Scout.; "2016 Team Ranking". Rivals.

=== Recruiting class of 2017 ===
College recruiting (2017)
Name	Hometown	School	Height	Weight	Commit date
Royce Hamm; PF	Houston, TX	Aldine High School	6 ft 8 in (2.03 m)	205 lb (93 kg)	Jul 1, 2016
Royce Hamm; PF	Recruit ratings: Scout: Rivals: 247Sports: ESPN:				
Jericho Sims; PF/C	Minneapolis, MN	Cristo Rey Jesuit High School	6 ft 8 in (2.03 m)	190 lb (86 kg)	Aug 30, 2016
Jericho Sims; PF/C	Recruit ratings: Scout: Rivals: 247Sports: ESPN:				
Jase Febres; SG	Houston, TX	Westfield High School	6 ft 5 in (1.96 m)	180 lb (82 kg)	Sep 30, 2016
Jase Febres; SG	Recruit ratings: Scout: Rivals: 247Sports: ESPN:				
Matt Coleman III; PG	Norfolk, VA	Oak Hill Academy	6 ft 1 in (1.85 m)	170 lb (77 kg)	Jan 16, 2017
Matt Coleman III; PG	Recruit ratings: Scout: Rivals: 247Sports: ESPN:				
Overall recruit ranking: Scout: 7 Rivals: 14 247Sports: 6 ESPN: 27
Note: In many cases, Scout, Rivals, 247Sports, On3, and ESPN may conflict in their listings of height and weight.; In these cases, the average was taken. ESPN grades are on a 100-point scale.; Sources: "2017 Texas Basketball Commitment List". Rivals.; "2017 Texas Basketball Recruiting Prospects". Scout.; "2017 Player Commits". ESPN.; "Scout.com Team Recruiting Rankings". Scout.; "2017 Team Ranking". Rivals.

Recruits at the 2016 McDonald's All-American Boys Game

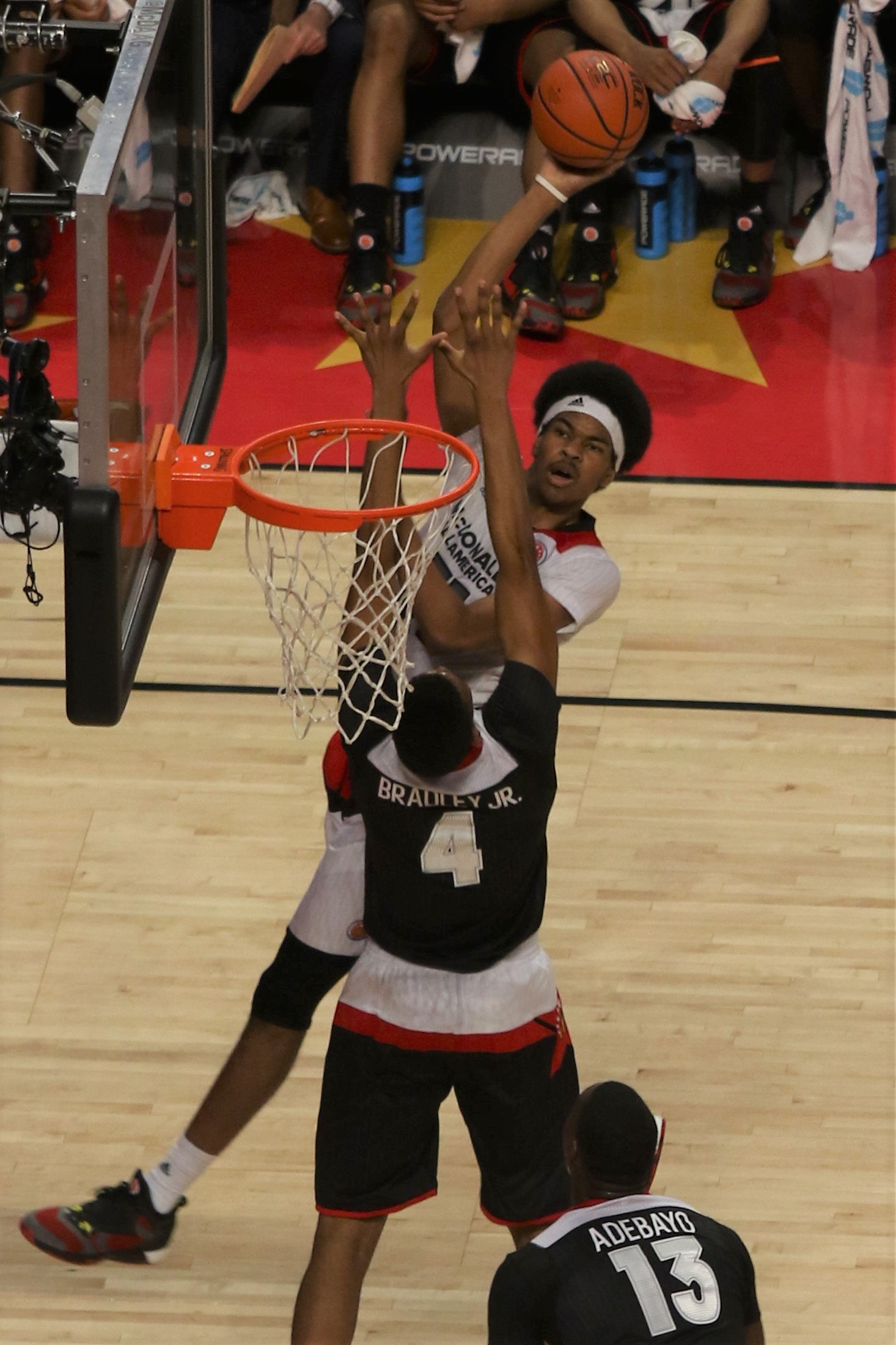
Jarrett Allen, Texas

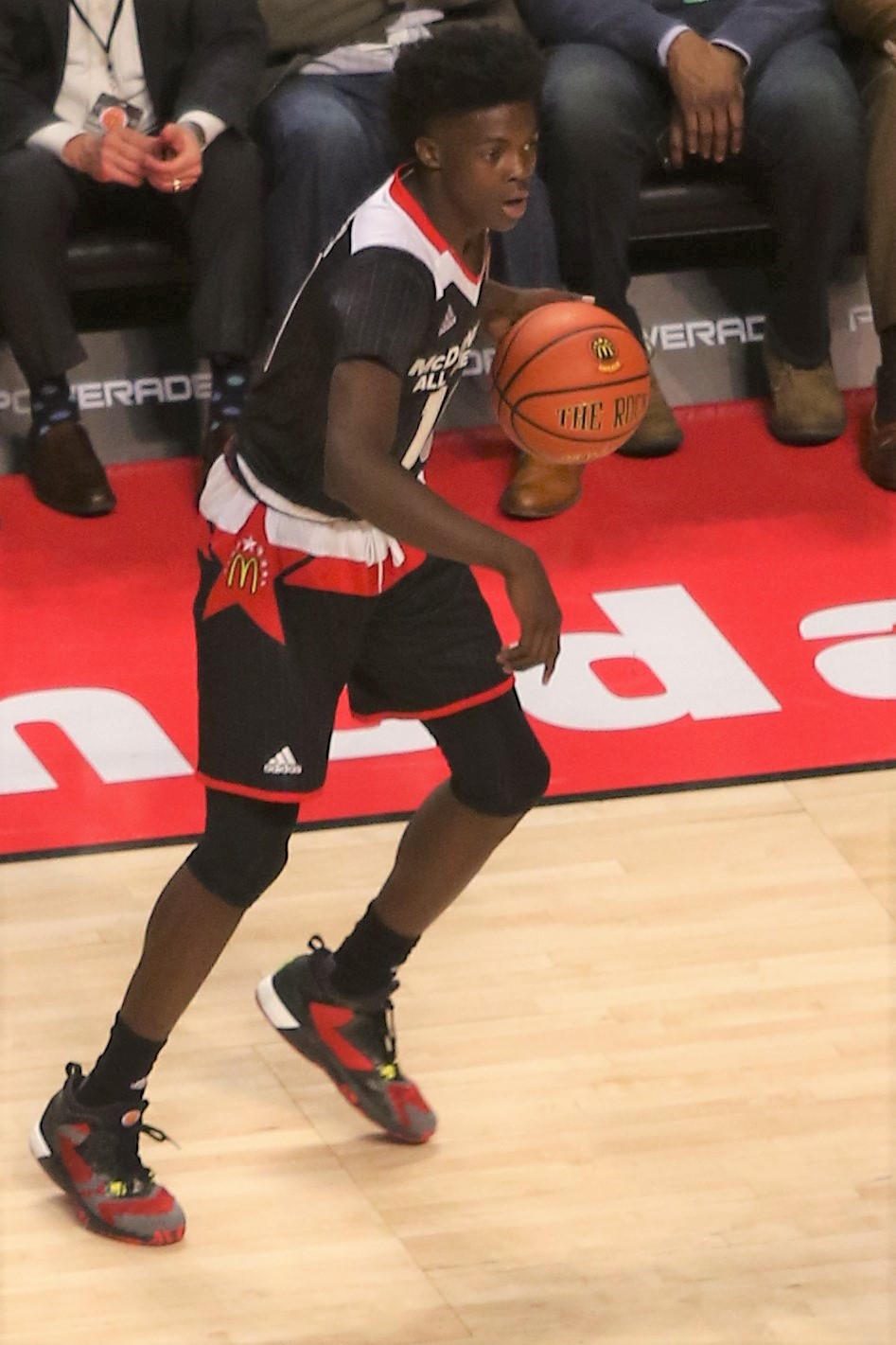
Andrew Jones, Texas

== Roster ==
2016–17 Texas Longhorns men's basketball team
Players
Coaches

Pos.	#	Name	Height	Weight	Year	Previous school	Hometown
G/F	0	Tevin Mack	6 ft 7 in (2.01 m)	220 lb (100 kg)	So	Dreher	Columbia, SC
G	1	Andrew Jones	6 ft 4 in (1.93 m)	190 lb (86 kg)	Fr	MacArthur	Irving, TX
G	2	Isaiah Hobbs	6 ft 3 in (1.91 m)	185 lb (84 kg)	Jr	Lake Worth Christian	Palm Beach, FL
G	3	Jacob Young	6 ft 2 in (1.88 m)	185 lb (84 kg)	Fr	Yates	Houston, TX
C	4	James Banks III	6 ft 10 in (2.08 m)	240 lb (109 kg)	Fr	La Lumiere	Decatur, GA
G	5	Kendall Yancy	6 ft 3 in (1.91 m)	210 lb (95 kg)	Sr	Berkner	Richardson, TX
G	10	Eric Davis Jr.	6 ft 3 in (1.91 m)	195 lb (88 kg)	So	Arthur Hill	Saginaw, MI
G	12	Kerwin Roach	6 ft 4 in (1.93 m)	175 lb (79 kg)	So	North Shore	Houston, TX
F	14	Mareik Isom	6 ft 9 in (2.06 m)	217 lb (98 kg)	RS Sr	Bowie	Austin, TX
F	21	Dylan Osetkowski (I) (redshirt)	6 ft 9 in (2.06 m)	250 lb (113 kg)	Jr	JSerra Catholic	San Diego, CA
G	25	Joe Schwartz (W)	6 ft 2 in (1.88 m)	185 lb (84 kg)	Jr	Vanguard College Prep	Waco, TX
F	30	Ryan McClurg (W)	6 ft 6 in (1.98 m)	230 lb (104 kg)	RS Jr	Seven Lakes	Katy, TX
F	31	Jarrett Allen	6 ft 11 in (2.11 m)	235 lb (107 kg)	Fr	St. Stephen's	Austin, TX
F	32	Shaquille Cleare	6 ft 8 in (2.03 m)	275 lb (125 kg)	Sr	The Village School	Andros, BS

Head coach

- Shaka Smart (Kenyon)

Assistant coach(es)

- David Cason (Illinois State)
- Darrin Horn (Western Kentucky)
- Jai Lucas (Texas)

Legend

- (C) Team captain
- (S) Suspended
- (I) Ineligible
- (W) Walk-on
- Injured
- Current redshirt

Roster

== Schedule and results ==
Date time, TV	Rank^{#}	Opponent^{#}	Result	Record	Site (attendance) city, state
Exhibition
November 2, 2016*; 7:00 pm, LHN	No. 21	Angelo State	W 95–55		Frank Erwin Center; Austin, TX
Regular season
November 11, 2016*; 7:00 pm, LHN	No. 21	Incarnate Word	W 78–73	1–0	Frank Erwin Center (10,922); Austin, TX
November 14, 2016*; 7:00 pm, LHN	No. 23	Louisiana–Monroe; Legends Classic regional round	W 80–59	2–0	Frank Erwin Center (8,953); Austin, TX
November 17, 2016*; 7:00 pm, LHN	No. 23	Eastern Washington; Legends Classic regional round	W 85–52	3–0	Frank Erwin Center (9,072); Austin, TX
November 21, 2016*; 8:30 pm, ESPN3	No. 22	vs. Northwestern; Legends Classic semifinals	L 58–77	3–1	Barclays Center (6,780); Brooklyn, NY
November 22, 2016*; 2:30 pm, ESPNU	No. 22	vs. Colorado; Legends Classic 3rd place game	L 54–68	3–2	Barclays Center (5,711); Brooklyn, NY
November 29, 2016*; 7:00 pm, LHN		Texas–Arlington	L 61–72	3–3	Frank Erwin Center (9,812); Austin, TX
December 2, 2016*; 8:30 pm, ESPNU		Alabama	W 77–68	4–3	Frank Erwin Center (10,268); Austin, TX
December 6, 2016*; 8:00 pm, ESPN2		at Michigan	L 50–53	4–4	Crisler Center (10,613); Ann Arbor, MI
December 10, 2016*; 5:00 pm, ESPN2		Long Beach State	W 71–65	5–4	Frank Erwin Center (10,173); Austin, TX
December 17, 2016*; 1:30 pm, ESPNU		vs. Arkansas; Houston Showcase	L 74–77	5–5	Toyota Center (8,777); Houston, TX
December 21, 2016*; 7:00 pm, LHN		UAB	W 96–60	6–5	Frank Erwin Center (9,106); Austin, TX
December 27, 2016*; 6:00 pm, ESPNU		Kent State	L 58–63	6–6	Frank Erwin Center (10,658); Austin, TX
December 30, 2016; 7:00 pm, ESPNews		at Kansas State	L 62–65	6–7 (0–1)	Bramlage Coliseum (12,528); Manhattan, KS
January 4, 2017; 7:00 pm, LHN		Oklahoma State	W 82–79	7–7 (1–1)	Frank Erwin Center (9,753); Austin, TX
January 7, 2017; 8:15 pm, ESPN2		at Iowa State	L 70–79	7–8 (1–2)	Hilton Coliseum (14,384); Ames, IA
January 11, 2017; 7:00 pm, LHN		TCU	L 61–64	7–9 (1–3)	Frank Erwin Center (9,661); Austin, TX
January 14, 2017; 3:00 pm, ESPN2		No. 10 West Virginia	L 72–74	7–10 (1–4)	Frank Erwin Center (10,751); Austin, TX
January 17, 2017; 6:00 pm, ESPN2		at No. 6 Baylor	L 64–74	7–11 (1–5)	Ferrell Center (7,604); Waco, TX
January 21, 2017; 1:00 pm, CBS		at No. 2 Kansas	L 67–79	7–12 (1–6)	Allen Fieldhouse (16,300); Lawrence, KS
January 23, 2017; 8:00 pm, ESPN		Oklahoma	W 84–83	8–12 (2–6)	Frank Erwin Center (10,898); Austin, TX
January 28, 2017*; 3:00 pm, ESPN		at Georgia; Big 12/SEC Challenge	L 57–59	8–13	Stegeman Coliseum (10,029); Athens, GA
February 1, 2017; 8:00 pm, ESPNU		Texas Tech	W 62–58	9–13 (3–6)	Frank Erwin Center (10,644); Austin, TX
February 4, 2017; 12:00 pm, ESPNews		at TCU	L 63–78	9–14 (3–7)	Schollmaier Arena (6,507); Fort Worth, TX
February 7, 2017; 8:00 pm, ESPN2		Iowa State	W 67–65	10–14 (4–7)	Frank Erwin Center (10,048); Austin, TX
February 11, 2017; 3:00 pm, ESPN2		at Oklahoma State	L 71–84	10–15 (4–8)	Gallagher-Iba Arena (8,592); Stillwater, OK
February 14, 2017; 8:00 pm, ESPN2		at Oklahoma	L 66–70	10–16 (4–9)	Lloyd Noble Center (7,545); Norman, OK
February 18, 2017; 1:00 pm, LHN		Kansas State	L 61–64	10–17 (4–10)	Frank Erwin Center (11,318); Austin, TX
February 20, 2017; 8:00 pm, ESPN		at No. 12 West Virginia	L 62–77	10–18 (4–11)	WVU Coliseum (10,460); Morgantown, WV
February 25, 2017; 5:00 pm, ESPN		No. 3 Kansas	L 67–77	10–19 (4–12)	Frank Erwin Center (14,111); Austin, TX
March 1, 2017; 8:00 pm, ESPN2		at Texas Tech	L 57–67	10–20 (4–13)	United Supermarkets Arena (12,643); Lubbock, TX
March 4, 2017; 3:00 pm, ESPN		No. 11 Baylor	L 64–75	10–21 (4–14)	Frank Erwin Center (12,195); Austin, TX
Big 12 Tournament
March 8, 2017; 8:00 pm, ESPNU	(10)	vs. (7) Texas Tech; First round	W 61–52	11–21	Sprint Center (18,972); Kansas City, MO
March 9, 2017; 6:00 pm, ESPNU	(10)	vs. (2) West Virginia; Quarterfinals	L 53–63	11–22	Sprint Center (18,972); Kansas City, MO
*Non-conference game. ^{#}Rankings from AP Poll. (#) Tournament seedings in parentheses. All times are in Central Time.

== Rankings ==
Ranking movements Legend: ██ Increase in ranking ██ Decrease in ranking — = Not ranked RV = Received votes
	Week																			
Poll	Pre	1	2	3	4	5	6	7	8	9	10	11	12	13	14	15	16	17	18	Final
AP	21	23	22	—	—	—	—	—	—	—	—	—	—	—	—	—	—	—	—	Not released
Coaches	9	22	21	21	RV	—	—	—	—	—	—	—	—	—	—	—	—	—	—	—

*AP does not release post-NCAA tournament rankings.

== See also ==
- 2016–17 Texas Longhorns women's basketball team
