= 2017 Big 12 men's basketball tournament =

- Classification: Division I
- Season: 2016–17
- Teams: 10
- Site: Sprint Center; Kansas City, Missouri
- Champions: Iowa State (4th title)
- Winning coach: Steve Prohm (1st title)
- MVP: Monte Morris (Iowa State)
- Attendance: 94,934 (overall); 18,972 (championship)
- Top scorer: Deonte Burton (Iowa State) (55 points)
- Television: ESPN, ESPN2, ESPNU

2016–17 Big 12 men's basketball standings
	Conf.				Overall
Team	W		L	PCT	W		L	PCT
No. 3 Kansas	16	–	2	.889	31	–	5	.861
No. 13 West Virginia	12	–	6	.667	28	–	9	.757
No. 12 Baylor	12	–	6	.667	27	–	8	.771
No. 16 Iowa State †	12	–	6	.667	24	–	11	.686
Oklahoma State	9	–	9	.500	20	–	13	.606
Kansas State	8	–	10	.444	21	–	14	.600
Texas Tech	6	–	12	.333	18	–	14	.563
TCU	6	–	12	.333	24	–	15	.615
Oklahoma	5	–	13	.278	11	–	20	.355
Texas	4	–	14	.222	11	–	22	.333
† 2017 Big 12 Tournament winner Rankings from AP poll

The 2017 Phillips 66 Big 12 men's basketball tournament was a postseason men's basketball tournament for the Big 12 Conference. It was played from March 8 to 11, in Kansas City, Missouri at the Sprint Center. Iowa State received the conference's automatic bid to the 2017 NCAA tournament with an 80–74 win over West Virginia in the finals.

== Seeding ==
The Tournament consisted of a 10 team single-elimination tournament with the top 6 seeds receiving a bye. Teams have been seeded by record within the conference, with a tiebreaker system used to seed teams with identical conference records.

2017 Big 12 Men's Basketball Tournament seeds
Seed	School	Conf.	Over.	Tiebreaker
1	Kansas ‡#	16–2	31–5	
2	West Virginia #	12–6	28–9	3–1 vs. Baylor/Iowa State
3	Baylor #	12–6	27–8	2–2 vs. West Virginia/Iowa State
4	Iowa State #	12–6	24–11	1–3 vs. West Virginia/Baylor
5	Oklahoma State #	9–9	20–13	
6	Kansas State #	8–10	21–14	
7	Texas Tech	6–12	18–14	1–1 vs. TCU, 0–2 vs Kansas, 1–1 vs. West Virginia
8	TCU	6–12	24–15	1–1 vs. Texas Tech, 0–2 vs. Kansas, 0–2 vs. West Virginia
9	Oklahoma	5–13	11–20	
10	Texas	4–14	11–22	
‡ – Big 12 Conference regular season champions, and tournament No. 1 seed. # – Received a single-bye in the conference tournament. Overall records include all games played in the Big 12 Conference tournament.

== Schedule ==
Game times for games 2, 4, 6, and 8 are subject to change because the second game of each session begins 30 minutes after the conclusion of the first game.

Session	Game	Time	Matchup	Television	Attendance
First Round – Wednesday, March 8
1	1	6:00 pm	#8 TCU 82 vs #9 Oklahoma 63	ESPNU	18,972
1	2	8:00 pm	#10 Texas 61 vs #7 Texas Tech 52	ESPNU	18,972
Quarterfinals – Thursday, March 9
2	3	11:30 am	#4 Iowa State 92 vs #5 Oklahoma State 83	ESPN2	18,972
2	4	1:30 pm	#8 TCU 85 vs #1 Kansas 82	ESPN2	18,972
3	5	6:00 pm	#2 West Virginia 63 vs #10 Texas 53	ESPNU	18,972
3	6	8:00 pm	#6 Kansas State 70 vs #3 Baylor 64	ESPNU	18,972
Semifinals – Friday, March 10
4	7	6:00 pm	#4 Iowa State 84 vs #8 TCU 63	ESPN2	18,972
4	8	8:00 pm	#2 West Virginia 51 vs #6 Kansas State 50	ESPN2	18,972
Final – Saturday, March 11
5	9	5:00 pm	#4 Iowa State 80 vs #2 West Virginia 74	ESPN	18,972
Game times in CT. #-Rankings denote tournament seed

== Bracket ==
First round Wednesday, March 8
8	TCU	82
9	Oklahoma	63
7	Texas Tech	52
10	Texas	61

Quarterfinals; Thursday, March 9
1	Kansas	82
8	TCU	85
4	Iowa State	92
5	Oklahoma State	83
2	West Virginia	63
10	Texas	53
3	Baylor	64
6	Kansas State	70

Semifinals; Friday, March 10
8	TCU	63
4	Iowa State	84
2	West Virginia	51
6	Kansas State	50

Championship; Saturday, March 11
4	Iowa State	80
2	West Virginia	74

== Game summaries ==
=== First round ===
ESPNU

March 8
6:00 PM

Recap

#8 TCU 82, #9 Oklahoma 63
Scoring by half: 44–31, 38–32
Pts: Vladimir Brodziansky 20; Rebs: Kenrich Williams 11; Asts: Alex Robinson 9	Pts: Khadeem Latin 18; Rebs: Khadeem Latin 9 Asts: Darrion Strong–Moore 4

Sprint Center, Kansas City, Missouri
Attendance: 18,972
Referees: Mike Stuart, Joe DeRosa, Doug Sirmons

ESPNU

March 8
8:00 PM

Recap

#7 Texas Tech 52, #10 Texas 61
Scoring by half: 20-26, 41-26
Pts: K. Evans 11; Rebs: N. Stevenson 8 Asts: 2 with 2	Pts: A. Jones 15; Rebs: K. Yancey 6 Asts: A. Jones 4

Sprint Center, Kansas City, Missouri
Referees: Paul Janssen, John Higgins, Ray Natili

=== Quarterfinals ===
ESPN2

March 9
11:30 AM

Recap

#4 Iowa State 92, #5 Oklahoma State 83
Scoring by half: 39-36, 53-47
Pts: M. Morris 21; Rebs: 2 with 10; Asts: M. Morris 9	Pts: J. Evans 29; Rebs: M. Solomon 9 Asts: J. Evans 4

Sprint Center, Kansas City, Missouri
Referees: Gerry Pollard, John Higgins, Keith Kimble

ESPN2

March 9
1:30 PM

Recap

#1 Kansas 82, #8 TCU 85
Scoring by half: 42-43, 40-42
Pts: F. Mason III 29; Rebs: L. Lucas 14; Asts: F. Mason III 6 L. Lucas (Kansas) Double double with 13 pts-14 rebs.	Pts: K. Williams 18; Rebs: K. Williams 8 Asts: A. Robinson 7; 3rd time the #1 seed lost their first game (2001 & 2009 the others)

Sprint Center, Kansas City, Missouri
Referees: Jeb Hartness, Don Daily, Ray Natili

ESPNU

March 9
6:00 PM

Recap

#2 West Virginia 63, #10 Texas 53
Scoring by half: 39-30, 24-23
Pts: J. Carter 21; Rebs: E. Macon 10; Asts: 2 with 4	Pts: A. Jones 13; Rebs: J. Allen 10; Asts: 2 with 4

Sprint Center, Kansas City, Missouri
Referees: Kipp Kissinger, Marques Pettigrew, Joe DeRosa

ESPNU

March 9
8:00 PM

Recap

#3 Baylor 64, #6 Kansas State 70
Scoring by half: 25-25, 45-39
Pts: A. Freeman 16; Rebs: J. Lual-Acuil Jr. 11; Asts: J. Lindsey 11	Pts: B. Brown 21; Rebs: D.J. Johnson 7 Asts: K. Stokes 5

Sprint Center, Kansas City, Missouri
Referees: Mike Stuart, Paul Janssen, Doug Sirmons

=== Semifinals ===
ESPN2

March 10
6:00 PM

Recap

#4 Iowa State 84, #8 TCU 63
Scoring by half: 44-27, 40-36
Pts: D. Burton 22; Rebs: S. Young 9 Asts: D. Burton 4	Pts: 2 with 10; Rebs: K. Williams 8 Asts: 2 with 5

Sprint Center, Kansas City, Missouri
Referees: Joe DeRosa, Doug Sirmons, Don Daily

ESPN2

March 10
8:00 PM

Recap

#2 West Virginia 51, #6 Kansas State 50
Scoring by half: 16-25, 35-25
Pts: E. Ahmad 15; Rebs: 2 with 10; Asts: J. Carter 6	Pts: W. Iwundu 13; Rebs: 3 with 6 Asts: K. Stokes 3

Sprint Center, Kansas City, Missouri
Referees: John Higgins, Kipp Kissinger, Keith Kimble

=== Championship ===
ESPN

March 11
5:00 PM

#4 Iowa State 80, #2 West Virginia 74
Scoring by half: 35–29, 45–45
Pts: M. Morris – 17; Rebs: M. Morris – 6 Asts: M. Morris – 3	Pts: J. Carter – 18; Rebs: E. Macon – 6 Asts: E. Ahmad – 6

Sprint Center, Kansas City, Missouri
Attendance: 18,972
Referees: John Higgins, Joe DeRosa, Doug Sirmons

== All-Tournament Team ==
Most Outstanding Player – Monte Morris, Iowa State

Player	Team	Position	Class
Monte Morris	Iowa State	0	0
Deonte Burton	Iowa State	0	0
Matt Thomas	Iowa State	0	0
Jevon Carter	West Virginia	0	0
Tarik Phillip	West Virginia	0	0

== See also ==
- 2017 Big 12 Conference women's basketball tournament
- 2017 NCAA Division I men's basketball tournament
- 2016–17 NCAA Division I men's basketball rankings
