= 2016–17 Indiana Hoosiers men's basketball team =

American college basketball season

2016–17 Indiana Hoosiers men's basketball

NIT, First Round
- Conference: Big Ten Conference
- Record: 18–16 (7–11 Big Ten)
- Head coach: Tom Crean (9th season)
- Assistant coaches: Tim Buckley (9th season); Chuck Martin (3rd season); Rob Judson (2nd season)
- Home arena: Simon Skjodt Assembly Hall

2016–17 Big Ten Conference men's basketball standings
	Conf.				Overall
Team	W		L	PCT	W		L	PCT
No. 15 Purdue	14	–	4	.778	27	–	8	.771
No. 25 Wisconsin	12	–	6	.667	27	–	10	.730
Maryland	12	–	6	.667	24	–	9	.727
Minnesota	11	–	7	.611	24	–	10	.706
No. 23 Michigan †	10	–	8	.556	26	–	12	.684
Northwestern	10	–	8	.556	24	–	12	.667
Michigan State	10	–	8	.556	20	–	15	.571
Iowa	10	–	8	.556	19	–	15	.559
Illinois	8	–	10	.444	20	–	15	.571
Ohio State	7	–	11	.389	17	–	15	.531
Indiana	7	–	11	.389	18	–	16	.529
Penn State	6	–	12	.333	15	–	18	.455
Nebraska	6	–	12	.333	12	–	19	.387
Rutgers	3	–	15	.167	15	–	18	.455
† 2017 Big Ten tournament winner Rankings from AP poll

The 2016–17 Indiana Hoosiers men's basketball team represented Indiana University in the 2016–17 NCAA Division I men's basketball season. Their head coach was Tom Crean, in what would be his final season in Bloomington. The team played its home games at Simon Skjodt Assembly Hall in Bloomington, Indiana, as a member of the Big Ten Conference.

Despite the highs of the previous season and being ranked as high as No. 3 in the nation, the Hoosiers faced a troubling and disappointing year; they finished 18–16 overall and 7–11 in Big Ten play to finish in a tie for 10th place. At the Big Ten tournament they defeated Iowa in the second round to advance to the quarterfinals, where they lost to Wisconsin. The Hoosiers missed out on the NCAA tournament and lost in the first round of the NIT, their first appearance since 2005, to Georgia Tech. The game was played at Georgia Tech's McCamish Pavilion because Indiana Athletic Director Fred Glass declined to host a home game at Simon Skjodt Assembly Hall, citing concerns it would "devalue" the Hoosiers' home court.

On March 16, 2017, Indiana fired Crean after nine years as head coach. On March 25, 2017, the school hired Archie Miller as head coach.

== Previous season ==
The Hoosiers finished the 2015–16 season with a record 27–8, 15–3 in Big Ten play to win the Big Ten regular season title outright, pushing the school's total to 22 conference titles (tied with conference rival, Purdue, for the most). They received the No. 1 seed in the Big Ten tournament, where they made an early quarterfinals exit by losing to Michigan. The team received a No. 5 seed in the NCAA Tournament, and defeated Chattanooga and Kentucky, having won two games before being eliminated in the Sweet 16 by North Carolina.

== Preseason ==
=== Departures ===
Indiana departures
Name	Number	Pos.	Height	Weight	Year	Hometown	Reason for departure
Yogi Ferrell	11	PG	6'0"	180	Senior	Indianapolis, Indiana	Graduated
Max Bielfeldt	0	F	6'8"	240	Graduate senior	Peoria, Illinois	Graduated
Nick Zeisloft	2	SG	6'4"	190	RS senior	La Grange, Illinois	Graduated
Ryan Burton	10	F	6'7"	220	RS senior	Bedford, Indiana	Graduated
Jackson Tharp	24	SG	6'4"	205	Senior	Zionsville, Indiana	Graduated
Harrison Niego	15	SG	6'2"	185	Freshman	Western Springs, Illinois	Transfer (Hillsdale College)
Troy Williams	5	F	6'7"	215	Junior	Hampton, Virginia	Declared for 2016 NBA draft

=== Recruiting class ===
Indiana was able to land its top recruit in De'Ron Davis, when he announced his commitment to become a Hoosier on November 12, 2015. IU had aggressively pursued Davis for more than three years, and they eventually beat out Mississippi State for the highly touted 6'9 forward from Aurora, Colorado. After leading Overland High School to two consecutive 5A state championship titles, Davis was crowned 2016 Colorado Mr. Basketball.

On April 24, 2016, a fifth man was added to the recruiting class when JUCO transfer Freddie McSwain Jr. committed to play for IU. He hails from Hinesville, Georgia and played basketball at Neosho County Community College.

College recruiting
Name	Hometown	School	Height	Weight	Commit date
Grant Gelon; G/F	Crown Point, IN	Crown Point HS	6 ft 5 in (1.96 m)	180 lb (82 kg)	Aug 13, 2015
Grant Gelon; G/F	Recruit ratings: Scout: Rivals: 247Sports: ESPN: (75)				
Curtis Jones; G	Highland Springs, VA	Huntington Prep	6 ft 3 in (1.91 m)	170 lb (77 kg)	Sep 19, 2015
Curtis Jones; G	Recruit ratings: Scout: Rivals: 247Sports: ESPN: (87)				
De'Ron Davis; F	Aurora, CO	Overland HS	6 ft 9 in (2.06 m)	235 lb (107 kg)	Nov 12, 2015
De'Ron Davis; F	Recruit ratings: Scout: Rivals: 247Sports: ESPN: (85)				
Devonte Green; G	Manhasset, NY	Long Island Lutheran HS	6 ft 2 in (1.88 m)	175 lb (79 kg)	Jan 9, 2016
Devonte Green; G	Recruit ratings: Scout: Rivals: 247Sports: ESPN: (72)				
Freddie McSwain Jr. F	Hinesville, Georgia	Liberty County High School/Neosho County Community College	6 ft 6 in (1.98 m)	220 lb (100 kg)	Apr 24, 2016
Freddie McSwain Jr. F	Recruit ratings: Scout: Rivals: 247Sports: ESPN: (N/A)				
Overall recruit ranking: Scout: N/A Rivals: 17 247Sports: 16 ESPN: 17
Note: In many cases, Scout, Rivals, 247Sports, On3, and ESPN may conflict in their listings of height and weight.; In these cases, the average was taken. ESPN grades are on a 100-point scale.; Sources: "2016 Team Ranking". Rivals.

== Future recruits ==
=== 2017–18 team recruits ===
College recruiting (2017)
Name	Hometown	School	Height	Weight	Commit date
Justin Smith; SF	Buffalo Grove, IL	Stevenson High School	6 ft 7 in (2.01 m)	210 lb (95 kg)	Sep 26, 2016
Justin Smith; SF	Recruit ratings: Scout: Rivals: 247Sports: ESPN:				
Al Durham; PG	Lilburn, GA	Berkmar High School	6 ft 4 in (1.93 m)	180 lb (82 kg)	Apr 6, 2017
Al Durham; PG	Recruit ratings: Scout: Rivals: 247Sports: ESPN:				
Clifton Moore; PF	Horsham, PA	Hatboro-Horsham High School	6 ft 10 in (2.08 m)	202 lb (92 kg)	Apr 13, 2017
Clifton Moore; PF	Recruit ratings: Scout: Rivals: 247Sports: ESPN:				
Race Thompson; PF	Minneapolis, MN	Robbinsdale Armstrong High School	6 ft 8 in (2.03 m)	200 lb (91 kg)	Jul 16, 2017
Race Thompson; PF	Recruit ratings: Scout: Rivals: 247Sports: ESPN:				
Overall recruit ranking:
Note: In many cases, Scout, Rivals, 247Sports, On3, and ESPN may conflict in their listings of height and weight.; In these cases, the average was taken. ESPN grades are on a 100-point scale.; Sources: "2017 Indiana Commits". Rivals.; "2017 Team Ranking". Rivals.

== Roster ==
2016–17 Indiana Hoosiers men's basketball team
Players
Coaches

Pos.	#	Name	Height	Weight	Year	Previous school	Hometown
G	0	Curtis Jones	6 ft 4 in (1.93 m)	175 lb (79 kg)	Fr	Huntington Prep	Richmond, Virginia
G	1	James Blackmon Jr.	6 ft 4 in (1.93 m)	200 lb (91 kg)	Jr	Marion	Marion, Indiana
G	2	Josh Newkirk	6 ft 1 in (1.85 m)	195 lb (88 kg)	RS Jr	Word of God Christian Academy / Pittsburgh	Raleigh, North Carolina
F	3	OG Anunoby (injured)	6 ft 8 in (2.03 m)	235 lb (107 kg)	So	Jefferson City	Jefferson City, Missouri
G	4	Robert Johnson	6 ft 3 in (1.91 m)	195 lb (88 kg)	Jr	Benedictine	Richmond, Virginia
G	10	Johnny Jager (W)	6 ft 0 in (1.83 m)	180 lb (82 kg)	So	Bloomington South	Bloomington, Indiana
G	11	Devonte Green	6 ft 3 in (1.91 m)	186 lb (84 kg)	Fr	Long Island Lutheran	North Babylon, New York
F	13	Juwan Morgan	6 ft 8 in (2.03 m)	230 lb (104 kg)	So	Waynesville	Waynesville, Missouri
F	15	Zach McRoberts (W)	6 ft 6 in (1.98 m)	200 lb (91 kg)	RS So	Carmel/Vermont	Carmel, Indiana
F	20	De'Ron Davis	6 ft 10 in (2.08 m)	240 lb (109 kg)	Fr	Overland	Aurora, Colorado
F	21	Freddie McSwain Jr.	6 ft 6 in (1.98 m)	215 lb (98 kg)	Jr	Liberty County/Neosho County CC	Hinesville, Georgia
G	22	Quentin Taylor (W)	6 ft 2 in (1.88 m)	187 lb (85 kg)	So	Brebeuf	Indianapolis, Indiana
G/F	24	Grant Gelon	6 ft 5 in (1.96 m)	195 lb (88 kg)	Fr	Crown Point	Crown Point, Indiana
F	30	Collin Hartman	6 ft 7 in (2.01 m)	220 lb (100 kg)	Sr	Cathedral	Indianapolis, Indiana
C	31	Thomas Bryant	6 ft 10 in (2.08 m)	255 lb (116 kg)	So	Huntington Prep	Rochester, New York
C	35	Tim Priller	6 ft 9 in (2.06 m)	225 lb (102 kg)	Jr	Richland	North Richland Hills, Texas

Head coach

- Tom Crean

Assistant coach(es)

- Tim Buckley
- Chuck Martin
- Rob Judson

Legend

- (C) Team captain
- (S) Suspended
- (I) Ineligible
- (W) Walk-on
- Injured
- Current redshirt

Roster
Last update: 4-26-2016

== Schedule ==
Date time, TV	Rank^{#}	Opponent^{#}	Result	Record	High points	High rebounds	High assists	Site (attendance) city, state
Exhibition
Nov 1*; 7:00 pm, BTN+	No. 11	Hope College	W 98–65		17 – Green	12 – Morgan	7 – Newkirk	Simon Skjodt Assembly Hall (17,222); Bloomington, IN
Nov 5*; 7:00 pm, BTN+	No. 11	Bellarmine	W 73–49		25 – Anunoby	8 – McSwain	4 – Tied	Simon Skjodt Assembly Hall (17,222); Bloomington, IN
Regular season
Nov 11*; 9:00 pm, ESPN	No. 11	vs. No. 3 Kansas; Armed Forces Classic	W 103–99 ^{OT}	1–0	26 – Blackmon, Jr.	10 – Tied	4 – Tied	Stan Sheriff Center (9,475); Honolulu, HI
Nov 16*; 7:00 pm, BTN	No. 6	UMass Lowell; Indiana Classic	W 100–78	2–0	23 – Blackmon, Jr.	7 – Tied	5 – Johnson	Simon Skjodt Assembly Hall (17,222); Bloomington, IN
Nov 19*; 7:00 pm, BTN+	No. 6	Liberty; Indiana Classic	W 87–48	3–0	20 – Blackmon, Jr.	11 – Anunoby	3 – Tied	Simon Skjodt Assembly Hall (12,537); Bloomington, IN
Nov 22*; 9:00 pm, BTN	No. 3	at Fort Wayne; Indiana Classic	L 68–71 ^{OT}	3–1	18 – Bryant	12 – Bryant	2 – Tied	Allen County War Memorial Coliseum (11,076); Fort Wayne, IN
Nov 27*; 4:00 pm, ESPN3	No. 3	Mississippi Valley State; Indiana Classic	W 85–52	4–1	21 – Anunoby	11 – Bryant	6 – Newkirk	Simon Skjodt Assembly Hall (17,222); Bloomington, IN
Nov 30*; 9:00 pm, ESPN	No. 13	No. 3 North Carolina; ACC–Big Ten Challenge	W 76–67	5–1	16 – Anunoby	9 – Blackmon, Jr.	3 – Tied	Simon Skjodt Assembly Hall (17,222); Bloomington, IN
Dec 2*; 7:00 pm, ESPN3	No. 13	SIU Edwardsville	W 83–60	6–1	18 – Morgan	10 – Morgan	3 – Tied	Simon Skjodt Assembly Hall (17,222); Bloomington, IN
Dec 4*; 4:00 pm, ESPN2	No. 13	Southeast Missouri State	W 83–55	7–1	17 – Johnson	10 – Bryant	8 – Newkirk	Simon Skjodt Assembly Hall (17,222); Bloomington, IN
Dec 10*; 4:00 pm, BTN	No. 9	Houston Baptist	W 103–61	8–1	18 – Blackmon, Jr.	13 – Bryant	4 – McRoberts	Simon Skjodt Assembly Hall (17,222); Bloomington, IN
Dec 17*; 5:00 pm, BTN	No. 9	vs. No. 18 Butler; Crossroads Classic	L 78–83	8–2	26 – Blackmon, Jr.	10 – Morgan	3 – Tied	Bankers Life Fieldhouse (18,684); Indianapolis, IN
Dec 19*; 8:00 pm, BTN	No. 16	Delaware State	W 103–56	9–2	19 – Anunoby	9 – Anunoby	6 – Johnson	Simon Skjodt Assembly Hall (13,307); Bloomington, IN
Dec 22*; 7:00 pm, BTN+	No. 16	Austin Peay	W 97–62	10–2	24 – Blackmon, Jr.	7 – Davis	11 – Newkirk	Simon Skjodt Assembly Hall (14,688); Bloomington, IN
Dec 28; 6:30 pm, BTN	No. 16	Nebraska	L 83–87	10–3 (0–1)	19 – Johnson	10 – Bryant	4 – Bryant	Simon Skjodt Assembly Hall (16,168); Bloomington, IN
Dec 31*; 12:30 pm, CBS	No. 16	vs. No. 6 Louisville; Countdown Classic	L 62–77	10–4	14 – Anunoby	11 – Blackmon, Jr.	2 – Tied	Bankers Life Fieldhouse (18,824); Indianapolis, IN
Jan 3; 7:00 pm, ESPN	No. 25	No. 13 Wisconsin	L 68–75	10–5 (0–2)	12 – 3 Tied	7 – Morgan	4 – Newkirk	Simon Skjodt Assembly Hall (14,679); Bloomington, IN
Jan 7; 5:00 pm, ESPNU	No. 25	Illinois; Rivalry	W 96–80	11–5 (1–2)	25 – Blackmon, Jr.	6 – Bryant	3 – Tied	Simon Skjodt Assembly Hall (16,506); Bloomington, IN
Jan 10; 9:00 pm, ESPN		at Maryland	L 72–75	11–6 (1–3)	22 – Blackmon, Jr.	7 – Bryant	2 – 3 Tied	Xfinity Center (17,213); College Park, MD
Jan 15; 12:00 pm, BTN		Rutgers	W 76–57	12–6 (2–3)	16 – Blackmon, Jr.	5 – Tied	5 – Newkirk	Simon Skjodt Assembly Hall (17,222); Bloomington, IN
Jan 18; 7:00 pm, BTN		at Penn State	W 78–75	13–6 (3–3)	17 – Tied	9 – Bryant	3 – Tied	Bryce Jordan Center (7,818); University Park, PA
Jan 21; 4:00 pm, ESPN		Michigan State	W 82–75	14–6 (4–3)	33 – Blackmon, Jr.	6 – Bryant	5 – Newkirk	Simon Skjodt Assembly Hall (17,222); Bloomington, IN
Jan 26; 9:00 pm, ESPN2		at Michigan	L 60–90	14–7 (4–4)	14 – Johnson	5 – Johnson	3 – Newkirk	Crisler Center (11,267); Ann Arbor, MI
Jan 29; 6:30 pm, BTN		at Northwestern	L 55–68	14–8 (4–5)	23 – Bryant	12 – Bryant	7 – Newkirk	Welsh-Ryan Arena (8,117); Evanston, IL
Feb 1; 6:30 pm, BTN		Penn State	W 110–102 ^{3OT}	15–8 (5–5)	31 – Bryant	11 – Tied	4 – Green	Simon Skjodt Assembly Hall (17,222); Bloomington, IN
Feb 5; 1:00 pm, CBS		at No. 10 Wisconsin	L 60–65	15–9 (5–6)	22 – Newkirk	6 – Bryant	6 – Johnson	Kohl Center (17,287); Madison, WI
Feb 9; 7:00 pm, ESPN2		No. 16 Purdue; Rivalry/Indiana National Guard Governor's Cup	L 64–69	15–10 (5–7)	23 – Bryant	8 – Newkirk	4 – Blackmon, Jr.	Simon Skjodt Assembly Hall (17,222); Bloomington, IN
Feb 12; 1:00 pm, CBS		Michigan	L 63–75	15–11 (5–8)	13 – Davis	6 – Johnson	3 – Johnson	Simon Skjodt Assembly Hall (17,222); Bloomington, IN
Feb 15; 9:00 pm, BTN		at Minnesota	L 74–75	15–12 (5–9)	22 – Blackmon, Jr.	10 – Bryant	2 – 3 Tied	Williams Arena (11,658); Minneapolis, MN
Feb 21; 9:00 pm, ESPN		at Iowa	L 90–96 ^{OT}	15–13 (5–10)	19 – Johnson	11 – Bryant	7 – Johnson	Carver-Hawkeye Arena (11,372); Iowa City, IA
Feb 25; 8:00 pm, BTN		Northwestern	W 63–62	16–13 (6–10)	13 – Blackmon, Jr.	6 – Tied	3 – Bryant	Simon Skjodt Assembly Hall (17,222); Bloomington, IN
Feb 28; 7:00 pm, ESPN2		at No. 16 Purdue; Rivalry/Indiana National Guard Governor's Cup	L 75–86	16–14 (6–11)	16 – Blackmon, Jr.	11 – Morgan	5 – Blackmon, Jr.	Mackey Arena (14,804); West Lafayette, IN
Mar 4; 12:00 pm, ESPN		at Ohio State	W 96–92	17–14 (7–11)	26 – Johnson	8 – Blackmon, Jr.	6 – Johnson	Value City Arena (15,560); Columbus, OH
Big Ten tournament
Mar 9; 6:30 pm, ESPN2	(10)	vs. (7) Iowa; Second Round	W 95–73	18–14	23 – Blackmon, Jr.	8 – Tied	4 – Tied	Verizon Center (12,408); Washington, D.C.
Mar 10; 6:30 pm, BTN	(10)	vs. (2) No. 24 Wisconsin; Quarterfinal	L 60–70	18–15	17 – Blackmon, Jr.	8 – Blackmon, Jr.	3 – Newkirk	Verizon Center (15,624); Washington, D.C.
NIT
Mar 14; 8:00 pm, ESPN	(3)	at (6) Georgia Tech; First round – Syracuse Bracket	L 63–75	18–16	14 – Morgan	7 – Bryant	4 – Newkirk	Hank McCamish Pavilion (5,533); Atlanta, GA
*Non-conference game. ^{#}Rankings from AP Poll. (#) Tournament seedings in parentheses. All times are in Eastern Time.

== Player statistics ==
Individual player statistics (final)
			Minutes		Scoring		Total FGs			3-point FGs			Free-throws			Rebounds							
Player	GP	GS	Tot	Avg	Pts	Avg	FG	FGA	Pct	3FG	3FA	Pct	FT	FTA	Pct	Off	Def	Tot	Avg	A	Stl	Blk	TO
Anunoby, OG	16	10	402	25.1	177	11.1	68	122	.557	14	45	.311	27	48	.563	28	59	87	5.4	23	21	21	26
Blackmon Jr., James	30	30	915	30.5	511	17.0	174	365	.477	91	215	.423	72	86	.837	29	115	144	4.8	56	21	1	58
Bryant, Thomas	34	34	954	28.1	427	12.6	148	285	.519	23	60	.383	108	148	.730	76	150	226	6.6	50	26	52	78
Davis, De'Ron	34	4	471	13.9	200	5.9	66	136	.485	0	0	.00	68	90	.756	53	53	106	3.1	31	14	24	41
Gelon, Grant	12	0	38	3.2	22	1.8	7	9	.778	3	5	.600	5	8	.625	2	3	5	.4	0	1	0	1
Green, Devonte	32	3	485	15.2	142	4.4	47	106	.443	24	55	.436	24	34	.706	9	48	57	1.8	34	22	6	40
Johnson, Robert	34	32	999	29.4	434	12.8	162	361	.449	70	189	.370	40	53	.755	12	137	149	4.4	85	29	3	78
Jones, Curtis	33	1	371	11.2	115	3.5	38	108	.352	21	60	.350	18	25	.720	8	36	44	1.3	31	14	3	24
McRoberts, Zach	31	3	350	11.3	24	.8	9	27	.333	4	12	.333	2	2	1.00	13	32	45	1.5	29	12	6	8
McSwain, Freddie	31	1	251	8.1	84	2.7	32	58	.552	0	3	.000	20	32	.625	35	42	77	2.5	4	10	3	23
Morgan, Juwan	32	20	722	22.6	247	7.7	86	157	.548	10	40	.250	65	88	.739	65	113	178	5.6	34	19	29	36
Newkirk, Josh	34	32	955	28.1	307	9.0	114	260	.438	35	92	.380	44	63	.698	23	82	105	3.1	108	19	7	76
Priller, Tim	9	0	27	3.0	19	2.1	7	9	.778	0	0	.000	5	6	.833	4	7	11	1.2	3	0	2	1
Taylor, Quentin	6	0	10	1.7	2	.3	1	1	1.00	0	0	.000	0	0	.000	1	1	2	.3	0	1	0	4
Total	34	-	6950	-	2711	79.7	959	2004	.479	295	776	.380	498	683	.729	413	913	1326	39.0	488	209	157	517
Opponents	34	-	6950	-	2491	73.3	867	2021	.429	233	692	.337	524	743	.705	355	723	1078	31.7	410	214	136	379

Legend
GP	Games played	GS	Games started	Avg	Average per game
FG	Field-goals made	FGA	Field-goal attempts	Off	Offensive rebounds
Def	Defensive rebounds	A	Assists	TO	Turnovers
Blk	Blocks	Stl	Steals	High	Team high

== Rankings ==
Ranking movements Legend: ██ Increase in ranking ██ Decrease in ranking — = Not ranked RV = Received votes
	Week																			
Poll	Pre	1	2	3	4	5	6	7	8	9	10	11	12	13	14	15	16	17	18	Final
AP	11	6	3	13	9	9	16	16	25	RV	—	—	—	—	—	—	—	—	—	Not released
Coaches	11	5	5	10	9	9	16	16	25	RV	RV	RV	RV	—	—	—	—	—	—	—

* AP does not release post-NCAA tournament rankings.

== See also ==
- 2016–17 Indiana Hoosiers women's basketball team
