= 2016–17 TCU Horned Frogs men's basketball team =

American college basketball season

2016–17 TCU Horned Frogs men's basketball

Global Sports Classic Champions

NIT Champions
- Conference: Big 12 Conference
- Record: 24–15 (6–12 Big 12)
- Head coach: Jamie Dixon (1st season)
- Assistant coaches: David Patrick; Ryan Miller (1st season); Corey Barker
- Home arena: Schollmaier Arena

2016–17 Big 12 men's basketball standings
	Conf.				Overall
Team	W		L	PCT	W		L	PCT
No. 3 Kansas	16	–	2	.889	31	–	5	.861
No. 13 West Virginia	12	–	6	.667	28	–	9	.757
No. 12 Baylor	12	–	6	.667	27	–	8	.771
No. 16 Iowa State †	12	–	6	.667	24	–	11	.686
Oklahoma State	9	–	9	.500	20	–	13	.606
Kansas State	8	–	10	.444	21	–	14	.600
Texas Tech	6	–	12	.333	18	–	14	.563
TCU	6	–	12	.333	24	–	15	.615
Oklahoma	5	–	13	.278	11	–	20	.355
Texas	4	–	14	.222	11	–	22	.333
† 2017 Big 12 Tournament winner Rankings from AP poll

The 2016–17 TCU Horned Frogs men's basketball team represented Texas Christian University in the 2016–17 NCAA Division I men's basketball season, led by head coach Jamie Dixon in his first season at TCU. The Horned Frogs played their home games at Schollmaier Arena in Fort Worth, Texas as members of the Big 12 Conference. They finished the season 24–15, 6–12 in Big 12 play to finish in a tie for seventh place. They defeated Oklahoma and Kansas in the Big 12 tournament before losing in the semifinals to Iowa State. They received an invitation to the National Invitation Tournament where they defeated Fresno State, Iowa, and Richmond to advance to the semifinals at Madison Square Garden. At MSG, they defeated UCF to advance to the NIT finals where they beat Georgia Tech to become the 2017 NIT champions.

== Previous season ==
The Horned Frogs finished the 2015–16 season 12–21, 2–16 in Big 12 play to finish in last place. They defeated Texas Tech in the first round of the Big 12 tournament to advance to the quarterfinals where they lost to West Virginia. Following the season, the school fired head coach Trent Johnson after four seasons at TCU. On March 21, 2016, the school hired Jamie Dixon, an alum of TCU, as head coach.

== Preseason ==
TCU was picked to finish in last place in the preseason Big 12 poll.

=== Departures ===
Name	Number	Pos.	Height	Weight	Year	Hometown	Reason
Lyrik Shreiner	0	G	6'3"	190	Freshman	Phoenix, AZ	Transferred to Cal State Northridge
Chauncey Collins	1	G	6'0"	180	Sophomore	Oklahoma City, OK	Playing professional overseas
Devonta Abron	23	F	6'8"	260	RS Senior	Dallas, TX	Graduated

=== Transfers ===
Name	Number	Pos.	Height	Weight	Year	Hometown	Previous School
Alex Robinson	25	G	6'1"	174	Junior	Arlington, TX	Texas A&M

== Recruiting ==
College recruiting information
Name	Hometown	School	Height	Weight	Commit date
Desmond Bane; SG	Richmond, IN	Seton Catholic High School	6 ft 5 in (1.96 m)	210 lb (95 kg)	May 12, 2016
Desmond Bane; SG	Recruit ratings: Scout: Rivals: 247Sports: ESPN:				
Jaylen Fisher; PG	Arlington, TN	Bolton High School	6 ft 2 in (1.88 m)	175 lb (79 kg)	May 4, 2016
Jaylen Fisher; PG	Recruit ratings: Scout: Rivals: 247Sports: ESPN:				
Kouat Noi; PF	Newcastle, Australia	Montverde Academy	6 ft 7 in (2.01 m)	205 lb (93 kg)	May 20, 2016
Kouat Noi; PF	Recruit ratings: Scout: Rivals: 247Sports: ESPN:				
Josh Parrish; SG	Mansfield, TX	Seguin High School	6 ft 5 in (1.96 m)	180 lb (82 kg)	Oct 10, 2015
Josh Parrish; SG	Recruit ratings: Scout: Rivals: 247Sports: ESPN:				
Overall recruit ranking: Scout: NR Rivals: NR ESPN: NR
Note: In many cases, Scout, Rivals, 247Sports, On3, and ESPN may conflict in their listings of height and weight.; In these cases, the average was taken. ESPN grades are on a 100-point scale.; Sources: "TCU 2016 Basketball Commitments". Rivals.; "2016 TCU Basketball Commits". Scout.; "ESPN". ESPN.; "Scout.com Team Recruiting Rankings". Scout.; "2016 Team Ranking". Rivals.

== Roster ==
2016–17 TCU Horned Frogs men's basketball team
Players
Coaches

Pos.	#	Name	Height	Weight	Year	Previous school	Hometown
G	0	Jaylen Fisher	6 ft 2 in (1.88 m)	195 lb (88 kg)	Fr	Bolton	Arlington, TN
G	1	Desmond Bane	6 ft 5 in (1.96 m)	215 lb (98 kg)	Fr	Seton Catholic	Richmond, IN
G	2	Michael Williams	6 ft 2 in (1.88 m)	190 lb (86 kg)	Sr	Reagan	San Antonio, TX
G	4	Gabe Adzich (W)	6 ft 4 in (1.93 m)	195 lb (88 kg)	Fr	Saint Francis	Cupertino, CA
G	5	Josh Parrish	6 ft 5 in (1.96 m)	220 lb (100 kg)	Fr	Seguin	Arlington, TX
F	10	Vladimír Brodziansky	6 ft 11 in (2.11 m)	220 lb (100 kg)	Jr	Canarias Basketball Academy; Pratt CC	Prievidza, Slovakia
F	11	Brandon Parrish	6 ft 6 in (1.98 m)	210 lb (95 kg)	Sr	Seguin	Arlington, TX
F	12	Kouat Noi (I)	6 ft 7 in (2.01 m)	205 lb (93 kg)	Fr	Montverde Academy (FL)	Newcastle, AUS
F	15	JD Miller	6 ft 8 in (2.03 m)	235 lb (107 kg)	So	Seagoville	Dallas, TX
G	20	Dalton Dry (W)	6 ft 3 in (1.91 m)	190 lb (86 kg)	Jr	Fort Worth Country Day	Fort Worth, TX
G	25	Alex Robinson	6 ft 1 in (1.85 m)	180 lb (82 kg)	Jr	Timberview; Texas A&M	Arlington, TX
C	32	Karviar Shephard	6 ft 11 in (2.11 m)	230 lb (104 kg)	Sr	Prime Prep Academy	Dallas, TX
F	33	Chris Washburn	6 ft 8 in (2.03 m)	240 lb (109 kg)	RS Sr	South Grand Prairie; UTEP	Grand Prairie, TX
F	34	Kenrich Williams	6 ft 7 in (2.01 m)	210 lb (95 kg)	Jr	University; New Mexico JC	Waco, TX
F	45	Austin Sottile (W)	6 ft 6 in (1.98 m)	225 lb (102 kg)	Jr	St. Louis University	Saint Louis, MO

Head coach

- Jamie Dixon (TCU)

Assistant coach(es)

- David Patrick, Assistant Head Coach (Louisiana)
- Ryan Miller, Assistant Coach (Northern State)
- Corey Barker (Prairie View A&M)
- Tom Herrion, Special Assistant (Merrimack)
- Thomas Montigel, Operations Coordinator (TCU)
- JoHan Wang, Assistant Director of Sports Medicine
- Stephen Gephardt, Assistant Strength Coach

Legend

- (C) Team captain
- (S) Suspended
- (I) Ineligible
- (W) Walk-on
- Injured
- Current redshirt

Roster
Last update: January 10, 2017

== Schedule and results ==
Date time, TV	Rank^{#}	Opponent^{#}	Result	Record	Site (attendance) city, state
Regular season
11/11/2016*; 6:00 pm, FSSW+		St. Thomas	W 82–64	1–0	Schollmaier Arena (6,075); Fort Worth, TX
11/14/2016*; 8:00 pm, FSSW+		Alabama State; Global Sports Classic	W 96–62	2–0	Schollmaier Arena (5,671); Fort Worth, TX
11/18/2016*; 6:00 pm, FSSW		Jacksonville State; Global Sports Classic	W 79–60	3–0	Schollmaier Arena (5,839); Fort Worth, TX
11/21/2016*; 5:00 pm, FSSW		Illinois State	W 80–71	4–0	Schollmaier Arena (5,938); Fort Worth, TX
11/25/2016*; 9:30 pm		at UNLV; Global Sports Classic semifinals	W 63–59	5–0	Thomas & Mack Center (9,815); Paradise, NV
11/26/2016*; 9:30 pm		vs. Washington; Global Sports Classic championship	W 93–80	6–0	Thomas & Mack Center (8,810); Paradise, NV
11/30/2016*; 6:00 pm, FSSW+		Washington	W 86–71	7–0	Schollmaier Arena (5,966); Fort Worth, TX
12/03/2016*; 7:00 pm		Arkansas State	W 77–54	8–0	Schollmaier Arena (6,022); Fort Worth, TX
12/07/2016*; 7:00 pm, ESPNews		at SMU	L 59–74	8–1	Moody Coliseum (6,872); Dallas, TX
12/10/2016*; 4:00 pm, FSSW		Wofford	W 72–63	9–1	Schollmaier Arena (5,822); Fort Worth, TX
12/18/2016*; 5:00 pm, ESPNU		Texas Southern	W 96–59	10–1	Schollmaier Arena (6,081); Fort Worth, TX
12/21/2016*; 8:00 pm, FSSW		Bradley	W 53–49	11–1	Schollmaier Arena (5,560); Fort Worth, TX
12/30/2016; 8:00 pm, ESPN2		No. 3 Kansas	L 80–86	11–2 (0–1)	Schollmaier Arena (6,579); Fort Worth, TX
01/03/2017; 8:00 pm, ESPNU		Oklahoma	W 60–57	12–2 (1–1)	Schollmaier Arena (5,576); Fort Worth, TX
01/07/2017; 12:00 pm, ESPNU		at No. 7 West Virginia	L 70–82	12–3 (1–2)	WVU Coliseum (12,568); Morgantown, WV
01/11/2017; 7:00 pm, LHN		at Texas	W 64–61	13–3 (2–2)	Frank Erwin Center (9,661); Austin, TX
01/14/2017; 4:30 pm, FSSW		Iowa State	W 84–77	14–3 (3–2)	Schollmaier Arena (6,564); Fort Worth, TX
01/18/2017; 6:30 pm, FSSW		at Texas Tech	L 69–75	14–4 (3–3)	United Supermarkets Arena (10,052); Lubbock, TX
01/21/2017; 7:00 pm, ESPNU		No. 6 Baylor	L 53–62	14–5 (3–4)	Schollmaier Arena (7,276); Fort Worth, TX
01/23/2017; 6:00 pm, ESPNU		at Oklahoma State	L 76–89	14–6 (3–5)	Gallagher-Iba Arena (6,090); Stillwater, OK
01/28/2017*; 5:00 pm, ESPNU		Auburn; Big 12/SEC Challenge	L 80–88	14–7	Schollmaier Arena (6,874); Fort Worth, TX
02/01/2017; 6:30 pm, ESPNews		at Kansas State	W 86–80	15–7 (4–5)	Bramlage Coliseum (11,103); Manhattan, KS
02/04/2017; 12:00 pm, ESPNews		Texas	W 78–63	16–7 (5–5)	Schollmaier Arena (6,507); Fort Worth, TX
02/07/2017; 8:00 pm, ESPNews		Texas Tech	W 62–61	17–7 (6–5)	Schollmaier Arena (6,468); Fort Worth, TX
02/11/2017; 1:00 pm, ESPNU		at No. 6 Baylor	L 52–70	17–8 (6–6)	Ferrell Center (7,906); Waco, TX
02/15/2017; 8:00 pm, ESPNU		Oklahoma State	L 68–71	17–9 (6–7)	Schollmaier Arena (6,301); Fort Worth, TX
02/18/2017; 5:00 pm, ESPNews		at Iowa State	L 71–84	17–10 (6–8)	Hilton Coliseum (14,384); Ames, IA
02/22/2016; 6:00 pm, ESPN2		at No. 3 Kansas	L 68–87	17–11 (6–9)	Allen Fieldhouse (16,300); Lawrence, KS
02/25/2017; 1:00 pm, ESPN		No. 12 West Virginia	L 60–61	17–12 (6–10)	Schollmaier Arena (6,486); Fort Worth, TX
03/01/2017; 8:00 pm, ESPNU		Kansas State	L 74–75	17–13 (6–11)	Schollmaier Arena (6,165); Fort Worth, TX
03/04/2017; 2:00 pm, ESPNews		at Oklahoma	L 68–73	17–14 (6–12)	Lloyd Noble Center (9,526); Norman, OK
Big 12 tournament
03/08/2017; 6:00 pm, ESPNU	(8)	vs. (9) Oklahoma; First Round	W 82–63	18–14	Sprint Center (18,972); Kansas City, MO
03/09/2017; 2:00 pm, ESPN2	(8)	vs. (1) No. 1 Kansas; Quarterfinals	W 85–82	19–14	Sprint Center (18,972); Kansas City, MO
03/10/2017; 6:00 pm, ESPN2	(8)	vs. (4) No. 23 Iowa State; Semifinals	L 63–84	19–15	Sprint Center (18,972); Kansas City, MO
NIT
March 15*; 7:00 pm, ESPN3	(4)	(5) Fresno State; First Round – Iowa Bracket	W 66–59	20–15	Schollmaier Arena (4,271); Fort Worth, TX
March 19*; 4:00 pm, ESPN2	(4)	at (1) Iowa; Second Round – Iowa Bracket	W 94–92 ^{OT}	21–15	Carver–Hawkeye Arena (15,400); Iowa City, IA
March 21*; 6:00 pm, ESPN2	(4)	(6) Richmond; Quarterfinals – Iowa Bracket	W 86–68	22–15	Schollmaier Arena (5,946); Fort Worth, TX
March 28*; 8:00 pm, ESPN	(4)	vs. (4) UCF; Semifinals	W 68–53	23–15	Madison Square Garden (5,210); New York City, NY
March 30*; 7:00 pm, ESPN	(4)	vs. (6) Georgia Tech; Championship	W 88–56	24–15	Madison Square Garden (5,029); New York City, NY
*Non-conference game. ^{#}Rankings from AP Poll / Coaches' Poll. (#) Tournament seedings in parentheses. All times are in Central Time.

Schedule Source: GoFrogs.com
