= 2016–17 West Virginia Mountaineers men's basketball team =

American college basketball season

2016–17 West Virginia Mountaineers men's basketball

NCAA tournament, Sweet Sixteen
- Conference: Big 12 Conference

Ranking
- Coaches: No. 11
- AP: No. 13
- Record: 28–9 (12–6 Big 12)
- Head coach: Bob Huggins (10th season)
- Assistant coaches: Larry Harrison; Ron Everhart; Erik Martin
- Home arena: WVU Coliseum

2016–17 Big 12 men's basketball standings
	Conf.				Overall
Team	W		L	PCT	W		L	PCT
No. 3 Kansas	16	–	2	.889	31	–	5	.861
No. 13 West Virginia	12	–	6	.667	28	–	9	.757
No. 12 Baylor	12	–	6	.667	27	–	8	.771
No. 16 Iowa State †	12	–	6	.667	24	–	11	.686
Oklahoma State	9	–	9	.500	20	–	13	.606
Kansas State	8	–	10	.444	21	–	14	.600
Texas Tech	6	–	12	.333	18	–	14	.563
TCU	6	–	12	.333	24	–	15	.615
Oklahoma	5	–	13	.278	11	–	20	.355
Texas	4	–	14	.222	11	–	22	.333
† 2017 Big 12 Tournament winner Rankings from AP poll

The 2016–17 West Virginia Mountaineers men's basketball team represented West Virginia University during the 2016–17 NCAA Division I men's basketball season. The Mountaineers were coached by Bob Huggins, in his 10th season as WVU's head coach, and played their home games at WVU Coliseum in Morgantown, West Virginia as members of the Big 12 Conference. They finished the season 28–9, 12–6 in Big 12 play to finish in a three-way tie for second place. They defeated Texas and Kansas State in the Big 12 tournament before losing to Iowa State in the championship game. They received an at-large bid to the NCAA tournament where they defeated Bucknell and Notre Dame before losing in the Sweet Sixteen to Gonzaga.

== Previous season ==
The Mountaineers finished the 2015–16 season 26–9, 13–5 in Big 12 play to finish in second place in conference. They defeated TCU and Oklahoma to advance to the championship game of the Big 12 tournament where they lost to Kansas. They received an at-large bid to the NCAA tournament where, as a No. 3 seed, they were upset in the First Round by No. 14 seed Stephen F. Austin.

== Departures ==
Name	Number	Pos.	Height	Weight	Year	Hometown	Notes
Jonathan Holton	1	F	6'7"	220	RS Senior	Miami, FL	Graduated
Jaysean Paige	5	G	6'2"	210	Senior	Jamestown, NY	Graduated
Richard Romero III	30	G	6'3"	185	Senior	White Sulphur Springs, WV	Graduated
Devin Williams	41	F	6'9"	255	Junior	Cincinnati, OH	Declare for 2016 NBA draft

== Recruits ==
College recruiting information
Name	Hometown	School	Height	Weight	Commit date
Maciej Bender #30 PF	Warsaw, Poland	Mountain Mission School (Grundy, VA)	6 ft 10 in (2.08 m)	235 lb (107 kg)	Oct 4, 2015
Maciej Bender #30 PF	Recruit ratings: Scout: Rivals: 247Sports: ESPN:				
Sagaba Konate #19 C	Hermitage, PA	Kennedy Catholic High School	6 ft 8 in (2.03 m)	235 lb (107 kg)	Oct 1, 2015
Sagaba Konate #19 C	Recruit ratings: Scout: Rivals: 247Sports: ESPN:				
Chase Harler; SG	Wheeling, WV	Wheeling Central Catholic High School	6 ft 3 in (1.91 m)	180 lb (82 kg)	Aug 3, 2014
Chase Harler; SG	Recruit ratings: Scout: Rivals: 247Sports: ESPN:				
Overall recruit ranking: Scout: Not Ranked Rivals: 23 ESPN: 20
Note: In many cases, Scout, Rivals, 247Sports, On3, and ESPN may conflict in their listings of height and weight.; In these cases, the average was taken. ESPN grades are on a 100-point scale.; Sources: "West Virginia 2016 Basketball Commitments". Rivals.; "2016 West Virginia Basketball Commits". Scout.; "ESPN". ESPN.; "Scout.com Team Recruiting Rankings". Scout.; "2016 Team Ranking". Rivals.

== Roster ==
2016–17 West Virginia Mountaineers men's basketball team
Players
Coaches

Pos.	#	Name	Height	Weight	Year	Previous school	Hometown
G	0	Teyvon Myers	6 ft 2 in (1.88 m)	185 lb (84 kg)	Sr	Williston State College	Brooklyn, NY
G	2	Jevon Carter	6 ft 2 in (1.88 m)	200 lb (91 kg)	Jr	Proviso East HS	Maywood, IL
G	3	James Bolden	6 ft 0 in (1.83 m)	160 lb (73 kg)	RS Fr	Holmes HS	Covington, KY
G	4	Daxter Miles, Jr.	6 ft 3 in (1.91 m)	200 lb (91 kg)	Jr	Notre Dame Prep	Baltimore, MD
F	11	Nathan Adrian	6 ft 9 in (2.06 m)	235 lb (107 kg)	Sr	Morgantown	Morgantown, WV
G	12	Tarik Phillip	6 ft 3 in (1.91 m)	195 lb (88 kg)	Sr	Independence CC	Brooklyn, NY
G	13	James Long	5 ft 11 in (1.8 m)	185 lb (84 kg)	Sr	Wofford	Charleston, WV
G	14	Chase Harler	6 ft 3 in (1.91 m)	180 lb (82 kg)	Fr	Wheeling Central	Moundsville, WV
F	15	Lamont West	6 ft 8 in (2.03 m)	220 lb (100 kg)	RS Fr	Miller Grove	Cincinnati, OH
F	20	Brandon Watkins	6 ft 9 in (2.06 m)	230 lb (104 kg)	Sr	Grady	Decatur, GA
F	21	Logan Routt	6 ft 11 in (2.11 m)	255 lb (116 kg)	RS Fr	Cameron	Cameron, WV
F	23	Esa Ahmad	6 ft 8 in (2.03 m)	230 lb (104 kg)	So	Shaker Heights	Shaker Heights, OH
F	25	Maciej Bender	6 ft 10 in (2.08 m)	235 lb (107 kg)	Fr	Mountain Mission School	Warsaw, Poland
F	45	Elijah Macon	6 ft 9 in (2.06 m)	240 lb (109 kg)	RS So	Brewster Academy	Columbus, OH
F	50	Sagaba Konate	6 ft 8 in (2.03 m)	240 lb (109 kg)	Fr	Kennedy Catholic	Bamako, Mali

Head coach

- Bob Huggins (West Virginia)

Assistant coach(es)

- Larry Harrison (Pittsburgh)
- Ron Everhart (Virginia Tech)
- Erik Martin (Cincinnati)

Legend

- (C) Team captain
- (S) Suspended
- (I) Ineligible
- (W) Walk-on
- Injured
- Current redshirt

Roster
Last update: July 18, 2016

== Schedule and results ==
Date time, TV	Rank^{#}	Opponent^{#}	Result	Record	Site (attendance) city, state
Exhibition
10/29/2016*; 6:00 pm	No. 20	vs. WVU Tech	W 131–56		Beckley-Raleigh County Convention Center (6,630); Beckley, WV
Regular season
11/11/2016*; 7:00 pm, RTPT	No. 20	Mount St. Mary's	W 87–59	1–0	WVU Coliseum (10,510); Morgantown, WV
11/14/2016*; 7:00 pm, RTPT	No. 19	Mississippi Valley State	W 107–66	2–0	WVU Coliseum (7,807); Morgantown, WV
11/20/2016*; 1:00 pm, RTPT	No. 19	New Hampshire; NIT Season Tip-Off	W 100–41	3–0	WVU Coliseum (8,842); Morgantown, WV
11/24/2016*; 2:30 pm, ESPNU	No. 19	vs. Illinois; NIT Season Tip-Off semifinals	W 89–57	4–0	Barclays Center (2,451); Brooklyn, NY
11/25/2016*; 3:00 pm, ESPN2	No. 19	vs. Temple; NIT Season Tip-Off finals	L 77–81	4–1	Barclays Center (3,713); Brooklyn, NY
11/28/2016*; 7:00 pm, RTPT	No. 25	Manhattan; NIT Season Tip-Off	W 108–61	5–1	WVU Coliseum (8,190); Morgantown, WV
12/03/2016*; 2:00 pm, ESPNU	No. 25	at No. 6 Virginia	W 66–57	6–1	John Paul Jones Arena (14,623); Charlottesville, VA
12/07/2016*; 7:00 pm, RTPT	No. 15	vs. Western Carolina	W 90–37	7–1	Charleston Civic Center (8,384); Charleston, WV
12/10/2016*; 2:00 pm, RTPT	No. 15	VMI	W 90–55	8–1	WVU Coliseum (9,023); Morgantown, WV
12/17/2016*; 2:00 pm, RTPT	No. 12	UMKC	W 112–67	9–1	WVU Coliseum (8,800); Morgantown, WV
12/20/2016*; 7:00 pm, WOWK	No. 11	Radford	W 84–57	10–1	WVU Coliseum (8,311); Morgantown, WV
12/23/2016*; 4:00 pm, RTPT	No. 11	Northern Kentucky	W 92–61	11–1	WVU Coliseum (10,197); Morgantown, WV
12/30/2016; 4:00 pm, ESPN2	No. 11	at Oklahoma State	W 95–72	12–1 (1–0)	Gallagher-Iba Arena (13,611); Stillwater, OK
01/03/2017; 9:15 pm, ESPNews	No. 7	at Texas Tech	L 76–77 ^{OT}	12–2 (1–1)	United Supermarkets Arena (10,013); Lubbock, TX
01/07/2017; 1:00 pm, ESPNU	No. 7	TCU	W 82–70	13–2 (2–1)	WVU Coliseum (12,568); Morgantown, WV
01/10/2017; 7:00 pm, ESPNU	No. 10	No. 1 Baylor	W 89–68	14–2 (3–1)	WVU Coliseum (14,632); Morgantown, WV
01/14/2017; 4:00 pm, ESPNU	No. 10	at Texas	W 74–72	15–2 (4–1)	Frank Erwin Center (10,751); Austin, TX
01/18/2017; 7:00 pm, ESPN2	No. 7	Oklahoma	L 87–89 ^{OT}	15–3 (4–2)	WVU Coliseum (11,895); Morgantown, WV
01/21/2017; 4:00 pm, ESPN2	No. 7	at Kansas State	L 75–79	15–4 (4–3)	Bramlage Coliseum (12,528); Manhattan, KS
01/24/2017; 7:00 pm, ESPN	No. 18	No. 2 Kansas	W 85–69	16–4 (5–3)	WVU Coliseum (13,694); Morgantown, WV
01/28/2017*; 12:00 pm, ESPN	No. 18	Texas A&M; Big 12/SEC Challenge	W 81–77	17–4	WVU Coliseum (12,836); Morgantown, WV
01/31/2017; 9:00 pm, ESPN2	No. 7	at Iowa State	W 85–72	18–4 (6–3)	Hilton Coliseum (14,384); Ames, IA
02/04/2017; 5:00 pm, ESPNU	No. 7	Oklahoma State	L 75–82	18–5 (6–4)	WVU Coliseum (14,225); Morgantown, WV
02/08/2017; 9:00 pm, ESPN2	No. 13	at Oklahoma	W 61–50	19–5 (7–4)	Lloyd Noble Center (4,663); Norman, OK
02/11/2017; 12:00 pm, ESPN	No. 13	Kansas State	W 85–66	20–5 (8–4)	WVU Coliseum (14,074); Morgantown, WV
02/13/2017; 9:00 pm, ESPN	No. 9	at No. 3 Kansas	L 80–84 ^{OT}	20–6 (8–5)	Allen Fieldhouse (16,300); Lawrence, KS
02/18/2017; 2:00 pm, ESPN2	No. 9	Texas Tech	W 83–74 ^{2OT}	21–6 (9–5)	WVU Coliseum (14,150); Morgantown, WV
02/20/2017; 9:00 pm, ESPN	No. 12	Texas	W 77–62	22–6 (10–5)	WVU Coliseum (10,460); Morgantown, WV
02/25/2017; 2:00 pm, ESPN	No. 12	at TCU	W 61–60	23–6 (11–5)	Schollmaier Arena (6,486); Fort Worth, TX
02/27/2017; 7:00 pm, ESPNU	No. 10	at No. 11 Baylor	L 62–71	23–7 (11–6)	Ferrell Center (8,203); Waco, TX
03/03/2017; 7:00 pm, ESPN2	No. 10	No. 24 Iowa State	W 87–76	24–7 (12–6)	WVU Coliseum (14,528); Morgantown, WV
Big 12 Tournament
03/09/2017; 7:00 pm, ESPNU	(2) No. 11	vs. (10) Texas; Quarterfinals	W 63–53	25–7	Sprint Center (18,837); Kansas City, MO
03/10/2017; 9:00 pm, ESPN2	(2) No. 11	vs. (6) Kansas State; Semifinals	W 51–50	26–7	Sprint Center (18,486); Kansas City, MO
03/11/2017; 6:00 pm, ESPN	(2) No. 11	vs. (4) No. 23 Iowa State; Championship	L 74–80	26–8	Sprint Center (18,972); Kansas City, MO
NCAA tournament
03/16/2017*; 2:45 PM, CBS	(4 W) No. 13	vs. (13 W) Bucknell; First Round	W 86–80	27–8	KeyBank Center (17,806); Buffalo, NY
03/18/2017*; 12:15 pm, CBS	(4 W) No. 13	vs. (5 W) No. 14 Notre Dame; Second Round	W 83–71	28–8	KeyBank Center (19,261); Buffalo, NY
03/23/2017*; 7:39 pm, TBS	(4 W) No. 13	vs. (1 W) No. 2 Gonzaga; Sweet Sixteen	L 58–61	28–9	SAP Center (16,884); San Jose, CA
*Non-conference game. ^{#}Rankings from AP Poll. (#) Tournament seedings in parentheses. W=West Region. All times are in Eastern Time.

== Rankings ==
Ranking movements Legend: ██ Increase in ranking ██ Decrease in ranking
	Week																			
Poll	Pre	1	2	3	4	5	6	7	8	9	10	11	12	13	14	15	16	17	18	Final
AP	20	19	19	25	15	12	11	11	7	10	7	18	7	13	9	12	10	11	13	Not released
Coaches	18	19	17	19	16	13	12	12	7	9	8	18	12	14	12	13	10	11	12	11

*AP does not release post-NCAA tournament rankings

== See also ==
- 2016–17 West Virginia Mountaineers women's basketball team
