= 2016–17 Baylor Bears basketball team =

American college basketball season

2016–17 Baylor Bears basketball

Battle 4 Atlantis champions

NCAA tournament, Sweet Sixteen
- Conference: Big 12 Conference

Ranking
- Coaches: No. 12
- AP: No. 12
- Record: 27–8 (12–6 Big 12)
- Head coach: Scott Drew (14th season)
- Assistant coaches: Jerome Tang; Alvin Brooks III; Paul Mills
- Home arena: Ferrell Center

2016–17 Big 12 men's basketball standings
	Conf.				Overall
Team	W		L	PCT	W		L	PCT
No. 3 Kansas	16	–	2	.889	31	–	5	.861
No. 13 West Virginia	12	–	6	.667	28	–	9	.757
No. 12 Baylor	12	–	6	.667	27	–	8	.771
No. 16 Iowa State †	12	–	6	.667	24	–	11	.686
Oklahoma State	9	–	9	.500	20	–	13	.606
Kansas State	8	–	10	.444	21	–	14	.600
Texas Tech	6	–	12	.333	18	–	14	.563
TCU	6	–	12	.333	24	–	15	.615
Oklahoma	5	–	13	.278	11	–	20	.355
Texas	4	–	14	.222	11	–	22	.333
† 2017 Big 12 Tournament winner Rankings from AP poll

The 2016–17 Baylor Bears basketball team represented Baylor University in the 2016–17 NCAA Division I men's basketball season. This was head coach Scott Drew's 14th season at Baylor. The Bears competed in the Big 12 Conference and played their home games at the Ferrell Center in Waco, TX. They finished the season 27–8, 12–6 in Big 12 play to finish in a three-way tie for second place. They lost to Kansas State in the quarterfinals of the Big 12 tournament. They received an at-large bid to the NCAA tournament where they defeated New Mexico State and USC before losing in the Sweet Sixteen to South Carolina.

== Previous season ==
The Bears finished the 2015–16 season 22–12, 10–8 in Big 12 play to finish in a tie for fifth place. They defeated Texas in the quarterfinals of the Big 12 tournament to advance to the semifinals where they lost to Kansas. They received an at-large bid to the NCAA tournament as a No. 5 seed and lost in the first round to No. 12-seeded Yale.

== Departures ==
Name	Number	Pos.	Height	Weight	Year	Hometown	Notes
Rico Gathers	2	F	6'8"	275	Senior	LaPlace, LA	Graduated; Entered 2016 NFL draft; Selected 6th Round, Pick #217 by the Dallas Cowboys
Lester Medford	11	G	5'10"	175	Senior	Tucson, AZ	Graduated
John Heard	13	F	6'5"	200	Senior	Houston, TX	Graduated
Taurean Prince	21	F	6'7"	220	Senior	San Antonio, TX	Graduated; Entered 2016 NBA draft; Selected 1st Round, Pick #12 by the Utah Jazz; Traded to the Atlanta Hawks
Austin Mills	33	G	6'1"	175	Senior	Beverly Hills, CA	Graduated

=== Incoming transfers ===
Name	Number	Pos.	Height	Weight	Year	Hometown	Notes
Nuni Omot	21	F	6'8"	193	Junior	Mahtomedi, MN	Junior college transferred from Indian Hills Community College.

== Recruits ==
College recruiting information
Name	Hometown	School	Height	Weight	Commit date
Mark Vital #13 SF	Lake Charles, LA	Prime Prep Academy	6 ft 6 in (1.98 m)	200 lb (91 kg)	Sep 3, 2013
Mark Vital #13 SF	Recruit ratings: Scout: Rivals: 247Sports: ESPN:				
Tyson Jolly; SG	Oklahoma City, OK	Elev8 Basketball Academy	6 ft 4 in (1.93 m)	185 lb (84 kg)	Apr 12, 2016
Tyson Jolly; SG	Recruit ratings: Scout: Rivals: 247Sports: ESPN:				
Overall recruit ranking:
Note: In many cases, Scout, Rivals, 247Sports, On3, and ESPN may conflict in their listings of height and weight.; In these cases, the average was taken. ESPN grades are on a 100-point scale.; Sources: "2016 Team Ranking". Rivals.

== Roster ==
2016–17 Baylor Bears men's basketball team
Players
Coaches

Pos.	#	Name	Height	Weight	Year	Previous school	Hometown
F	0	Jo Lual-Acuil Jr.	7 ft 0 in (2.13 m)	220 lb (100 kg)	RS Jr	Kingsway Christian College; Neosho County CC	Melbourne, Australia
G	1	Wendell Mitchell	6 ft 3 in (1.91 m)	180 lb (82 kg)	RS Fr	Rockdale	Rockdale, TX
G	3	Jake Lindsey	6 ft 5 in (1.96 m)	190 lb (86 kg)	So	Olympus	Salt Lake City, UT
F	5	Johnathan Motley	6 ft 10 in (2.08 m)	230 lb (104 kg)	RS Jr	North Shore	Houston, TX
G	10	Tyson Jolly	6 ft 4 in (1.93 m)	190 lb (86 kg)	Fr	Elev8 Basketball Academy	Oklahoma City, OK
F	11	Mark Vital	6 ft 5 in (1.96 m)	230 lb (104 kg)	Fr	Advanced Prep International	Lake Charles, LA
G	20	Manu Lecomte	5 ft 11 in (1.8 m)	175 lb (79 kg)	RS Jr	Athénée des Pagodes; Miami (FL)	Brussels, Belgium
F	21	Nuni Omot	6 ft 9 in (2.06 m)	205 lb (93 kg)	Jr	Mahtomedi; Indian Hills CC	Mahtomedi, MN
G	22	King McClure	6 ft 3 in (1.91 m)	215 lb (98 kg)	So	Triple A Academy	Ovilla, TX
G	24	Ish Wainright	6 ft 5 in (1.96 m)	235 lb (107 kg)	Sr	Montrose Christian	Kansas City, MO
G	25	Al Freeman	6 ft 3 in (1.91 m)	200 lb (91 kg)	RS Jr	Findlay Prep	Charlotte, NC
F	31	Terry Maston	6 ft 8 in (2.03 m)	230 lb (104 kg)	Jr	DeSoto	DeSoto, TX

Head coach

- Scott Drew (Butler)

Assistant coach(es)

- Jerome Tang (Charter Oak State)
- Alvin Brooks III (Idaho State)
- Paul Mills (Texas A&M)

Legend

- (C) Team captain
- (S) Suspended
- (I) Ineligible
- (W) Walk-on
- Injured
- Current redshirt

== Schedule and results ==
Date time, TV	Rank^{#}	Opponent^{#}	Result	Record	Site (attendance) city, state
Regular season
Nov 11, 2016*; 6:30 pm, ESPNU		Oral Roberts	W 76–61	1–0	Ferrell Center (5,250); Waco, TX
Nov 15, 2016*; 2:30 pm, ESPN2		No. 4 Oregon; College Hoops Tip-Off Marathon	W 66–49	2–0	Ferrell Center (5,891); Waco, TX
Nov 18, 2016*; 7:00 pm, FCS		Florida Gulf Coast; Battle 4 Atlantis opening round	W 81–72	3–0	Ferrell Center (5,906); Waco, TX
Nov 23, 2016*; 1:30 pm, ESPN2	No. 20	vs. VCU; Battle 4 Atlantis quarterfinals	W 71–63	4–0	Imperial Arena (1,215); Nassau, Bahamas
Nov 24, 2016*; 11:00 am, ESPN	No. 20	vs. No. 24 Michigan State; Battle 4 Atlantis semifinals	W 73–58	5–0	Imperial Arena (1,597); Nassau, BAH
Nov 25, 2016*; 2:30 pm, ESPN	No. 20	vs. No. 10 Louisville; Battle 4 Atlantis championship	W 66–63	6–0	Imperial Arena (1,655); Nassau, BAH
Nov 30, 2016*; 8:00 pm, FSSW+	No. 9	Sam Houston State	W 79–45	7–0	Ferrell Center (5,029); Waco, TX
Dec 03, 2016*; 2:30 pm, ESPN2	No. 9	No. 7 Xavier	W 76–61	8–0	Ferrell Center (9,684); Waco, TX
Dec 14, 2016*; 6:00 pm, ESPNU	No. 4	Southern	W 89–59	9–0	Ferrell Center (5,091); Waco, TX
Dec 17, 2016*; 5:00 pm, FSSW+	No. 4	vs. Jackson State; Fort Hood Showcase	W 82–57	10–0	Abrams Gym (2,000); Fort Hood, TX
Dec 18, 2016*; 3:30 pm, FSSW	No. 4	John Brown	W 107–53	11–0	Ferrell Center (5,045); Waco, TX
Dec 21, 2016*; 6:30 pm, FSSW	No. 4	Texas Southern	W 89–63	12–0	Ferrell Center (5,347); Waco, TX
Dec 30, 2016; 6:00 pm, ESPN2	No. 4	at Oklahoma	W 76–50	13–0 (1–0)	Lloyd Noble Center (10,254); Norman, OK
Jan 04, 2017; 7:00 pm, ESPNews	No. 2	Iowa State	W 65–63	14–0 (2–0)	Ferrell Center (7,582); Waco, TX
Jan 07, 2017; 6:00 pm, ESPNews	No. 2	Oklahoma State	W 61–57	15–0 (3–0)	Ferrell Center (10,627); Waco, TX
Jan 10, 2017; 6:00 pm, ESPN2	No. 1	at No. 10 West Virginia	L 68–89	15–1 (3–1)	WVU Coliseum (14,632); Morgantown, WV
Jan 14, 2017; 3:30 pm, ESPNU	No. 1	at No. 25 Kansas State	W 77–68	16–1 (4–1)	Bramlage Coliseum (12,528); Manhattan, KS
Jan 17, 2017; 6:00 pm, ESPN2	No. 6	Texas	W 74–64	17–1 (5–1)	Ferrell Center (7,604); Waco, TX
Jan 21, 2017; 7:00 pm, ESPNU	No. 6	at TCU	W 62–53	18–1 (6–1)	Schollmaier Arena (7,276); Fort Worth, TX
Jan 25, 2017; 7:00 pm, ESPNews	No. 5	Texas Tech	W 65–61	19–1 (7–1)	Ferrell Center (7,059); Waco, TX
Jan 28, 2017*; 5:00 pm, ESPN2	No. 5	at Ole Miss; Big 12/SEC Challenge	W 78–75	20–1	The Pavilion at Ole Miss (9,411); Oxford, MS
Feb 01, 2017; 8:00 pm, ESPN2	No. 2	at No. 3 Kansas	L 68–73	20–2 (7–2)	Allen Fieldhouse (16,300); Lawrence, KS
Feb 04, 2017; 2:00 pm, ESPNews	No. 2	Kansas State	L 54–56	20–3 (7–3)	Ferrell Center (7,729); Waco, TX
Feb 08, 2017; 6:00 pm, ESPNU	No. 6	at Oklahoma State	W 72–69	21–3 (8–3)	Gallagher-Iba Arena (8,170); Stillwater, OK
Feb 11, 2017; 1:00 pm, ESPNU	No. 6	TCU	W 70–52	22–3 (9–3)	Ferrell Center (7,906); Waco, TX
Feb 13, 2017; 6:00 pm, ESPNews	No. 4	at Texas Tech	L 78–84	22–4 (9–4)	United Supermarkets Arena (9,202); Lubbock, TX
Feb 18, 2017; 12:00 pm, CBS	No. 4	No. 3 Kansas	L 65–67	22–5 (9–5)	Ferrell Center (10,021); Waco, TX
Feb 21, 2017; 6:00 pm, ESPN2	No. 9	Oklahoma	W 60–54	23–5 (10–5)	Ferrell Center (6,135); Waco, TX
Feb 25, 2017; 3:00 pm, ESPN	No. 9	at Iowa State	L 69–72	23–6 (10–6)	Hilton Coliseum (14,384); Ames, IA
Feb 27, 2017; 6:00 pm, ESPNU	No. 11	No. 10 West Virginia	W 71–62	24–6 (11–6)	Ferrell Center (8,203); Waco, TX
Mar 04, 2017; 3:00 pm, ESPN	No. 11	at Texas	W 75–64	25–6 (12–6)	Frank Erwin Center (12,195); Austin, TX
Big 12 tournament
Mar 09, 2017; 8:00 pm, ESPNU	(3) No. 9	vs. (6) Kansas State; Quarterfinals	L 64–70	25–7	Sprint Center (18,837); Kansas City, MO
NCAA tournament
Mar 17, 2017*; 11:40 am, truTV	(3 E) No. 12	vs. (14 E) New Mexico State; First Round	W 91–73	26–7	BOK Center (13,571); Tulsa, OK
Mar 19, 2017*; 6:45 pm, truTV	(3 E) No. 12	vs. (11 E) USC; Second Round	W 82–78	27–7	BOK Center (13,571); Tulsa, OK
Mar 24, 2017*; 6:29 pm, TBS	(3 E) No. 12	vs. (7 E) South Carolina; Sweet Sixteen	L 50–70	27–8	Madison Square Garden (19,812); New York, NY
*Non-conference game. ^{#}Rankings from AP Poll. (#) Tournament seedings in parentheses. E=East Region. All times are in Central Time.

== Rankings ==
Ranking movements Legend: ██ Increase in ranking ██ Decrease in ranking — = Not ranked RV = Received votes ( ) = First-place votes
	Week																			
Poll	Pre	1	2	3	4	5	6	7	8	9	10	11	12	13	14	15	16	17	18	Final
AP	—	—	20	9 (1)	4 (6)	4 (6)	4 (6)	4 (6)	2 (6)	1 (55)	6	5	2	6	4	9	11	9	12	Not released
Coaches	—	—	RV	11	6	5	6	4	3	1 (22)	6	5	3	8	4	9	11	10	11	12

*AP does not release post-NCAA tournament rankings
