= 2016–17 Kansas Jayhawks men's basketball team =

American college basketball season

2016–17 Kansas Jayhawks men's basketball

Big 12 regular season champions CBE Hall of Fame Classic champions

NCAA tournament, Elite Eight
- Conference: Big 12 Conference

Ranking
- Coaches: No. 4
- AP: No. 3
- Record: 31–5 (16–2 Big 12)
- Head coach: Bill Self (14th season)
- Assistant coaches: Jerrance Howard (4th season); Norm Roberts (6th season); Kurtis Townsend (13th season)
- Home arena: Allen Fieldhouse

2016–17 Big 12 men's basketball standings
	Conf.				Overall
Team	W		L	PCT	W		L	PCT
No. 3 Kansas	16	–	2	.889	31	–	5	.861
No. 13 West Virginia	12	–	6	.667	28	–	9	.757
No. 12 Baylor	12	–	6	.667	27	–	8	.771
No. 16 Iowa State †	12	–	6	.667	24	–	11	.686
Oklahoma State	9	–	9	.500	20	–	13	.606
Kansas State	8	–	10	.444	21	–	14	.600
Texas Tech	6	–	12	.333	18	–	14	.563
TCU	6	–	12	.333	24	–	15	.615
Oklahoma	5	–	13	.278	11	–	20	.355
Texas	4	–	14	.222	11	–	22	.333
† 2017 Big 12 Tournament winner Rankings from AP poll

The 2016–17 Kansas Jayhawks men's basketball team represented the University of Kansas in the 2016–17 NCAA Division I men's basketball season, which was the Jayhawks' 119th basketball season. The Jayhawks, members of the Big 12 Conference, played their home games at Allen Fieldhouse and were led by 14th-year head coach Bill Self. They finished the season 31–5, 16–2 in Big 12 play to win their 13th consecutive Big 12 regular season title, tying UCLA's record for consecutive regular season conference titles. They lost in the quarterfinals of the Big 12 tournament to TCU. They received an at-large bid to the NCAA tournament as a No. 1 seed in the Midwest region. This was their 28th consecutive appearance, the longest active streak at the time and the longest ever in NCAA Tournament history. It was the final official appearance in the streak as their tournament appearance in the following season was vacated by the NCAA. In the Tturnament, they defeated UC Davis and Michigan State to advance to the Sweet Sixteen. There they defeated Purdue before losing in the Elite Eight to Oregon.

The Jayhawks entered the season with 40 straight wins at Allen Fieldhouse, which extended to 51 games during the season before it ended on February 5, 2017, with an 92–89 loss to Iowa State, which was the longest active home arena winning streak in the nation when it ended.

== Preseason ==
=== Departures ===
==== Graduation ====
Name	Position
Jamari Traylor	F
Hunter Mickelson	F
Evan Manning	G
Perry Ellis	F

==== Early draft entrants ====
===== Hired agent =====
Name	Position	Class
Wayne Selden, Jr.	G	Junior
Brannen Greene	G	Junior

===== Did not initially hire agent =====
Starting with the 2016 NBA draft, if a player declares for the draft, but does not hire an agent, it allows the player to return to their school even after participating in the combine, as long as they decide by May 25.

Name	Position	Class	Returned/ entered draft
Cheick Diallo	F	Freshman	Entered draft

=== Transfers ===
Name	Position	Old school	New school
Evan Maxwell	C	Liberty	Kansas
Malik Newman	G	Mississippi State	Kansas

=== Coaching changes ===
Coach	Old position	New position
Aaron Miles	Assistant director of student-athlete development, Kansas	Assistant coach, Florida Gulf Coast

=== Recruiting class ===
==== Class of 2016 ====
Recruits at the 2016 McDonald's All-American Boys Game

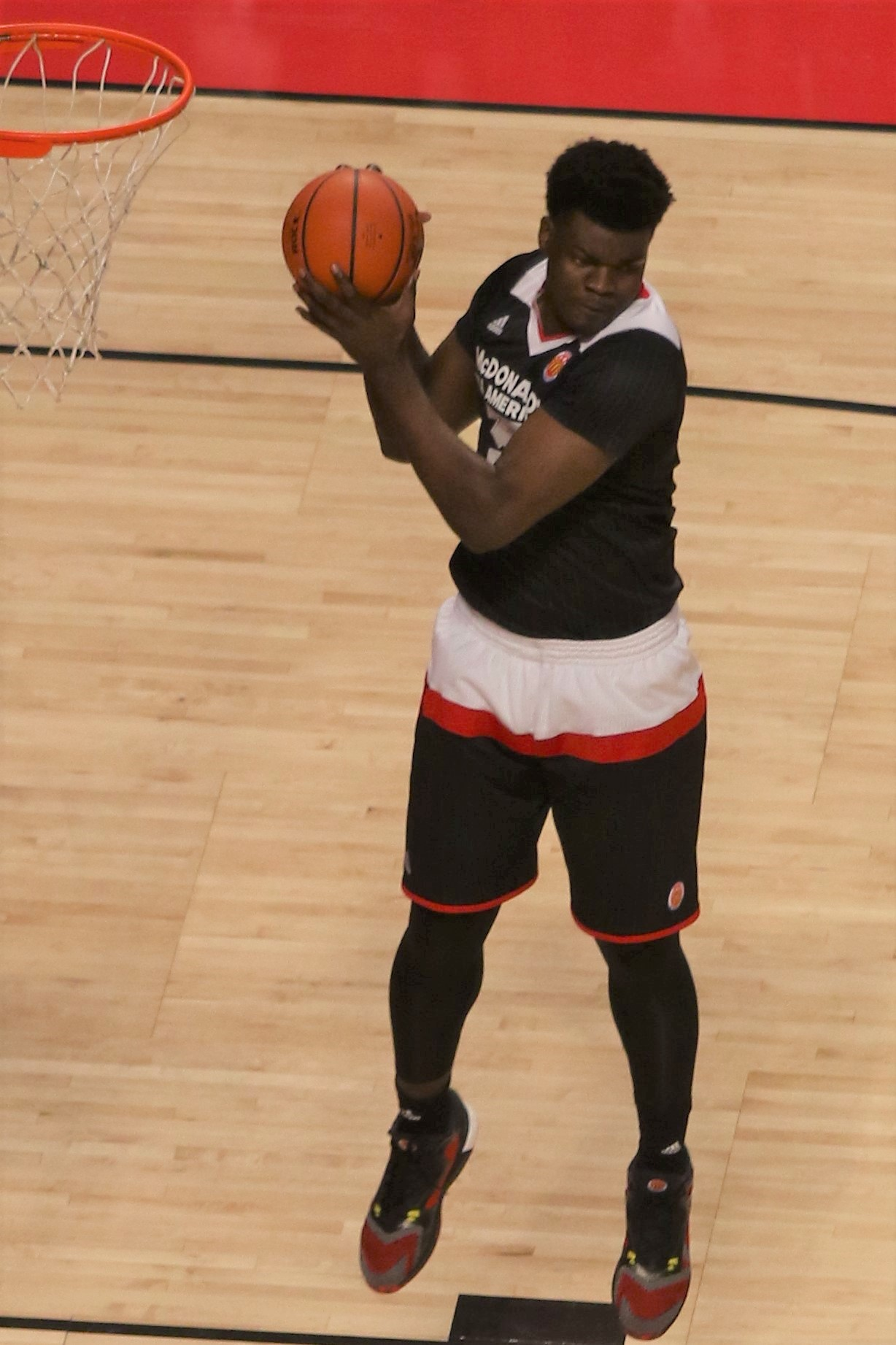
Udoka Azubuike, Kansas

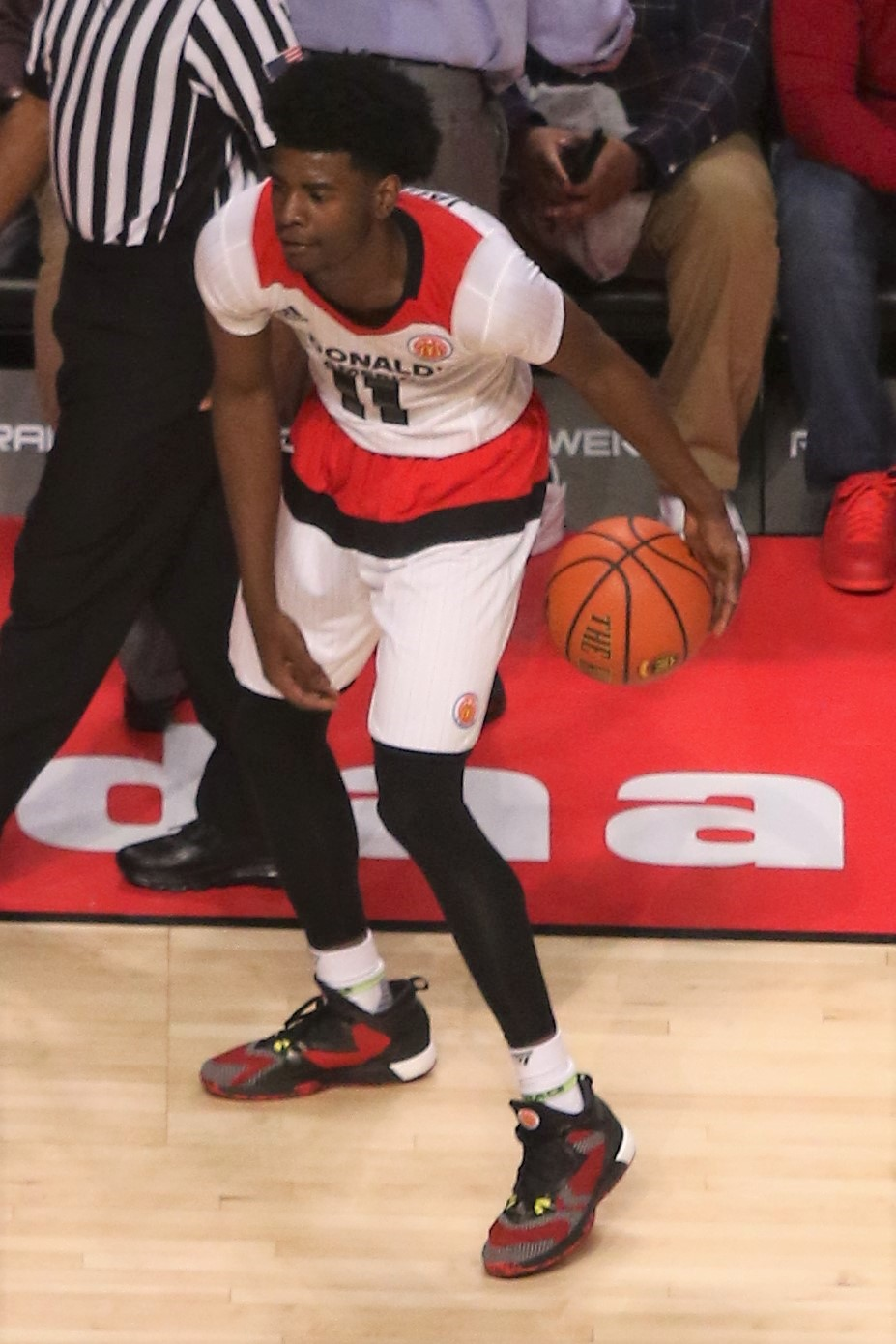
Josh Jackson, Kansas

College recruiting
Name	Hometown	School	Height	Weight	Commit date
Josh Jackson; G/F	Southfield, MI	Prolific Prep (CA)	6 ft 7 in (2.01 m)	195 lb (88 kg)	Apr 11, 2016
Josh Jackson; G/F	Recruit ratings: Scout: Rivals: 247Sports: ESPN: (97)				
Udoka Azubuike; C	Delta, Nigeria	Potters House Christian (FL)	6 ft 11 in (2.11 m)	270 lb (120 kg)	Jan 28, 2016
Udoka Azubuike; C	Recruit ratings: Scout: Rivals: 247Sports: ESPN: (92)				
Mitch Lightfoot; PF	Tucson, AZ	Gilbert Christian High School	6 ft 8 in (2.03 m)	210 lb (95 kg)	Oct 24, 2015
Mitch Lightfoot; PF	Recruit ratings: Scout: Rivals: 247Sports: ESPN: (83)				
Overall recruiting rankings: Scout: 9 Rivals: 7 247 Sports: 12 ESPN: 7

== Roster ==
2016–17 Kansas Jayhawks men's basketball team
Players
Coaches

Pos.	#	Name	Height	Weight	Year	Hometown
G	0	Frank Mason III	5 ft 11 in (1.8 m)	190 lb (86 kg)	Sr	Petersburg, VA
G	2	LaGerald Vick	6 ft 5 in (1.96 m)	175 lb (79 kg)	So	Memphis, TN
G	4	Devonte' Graham	6 ft 2 in (1.88 m)	185 lb (84 kg)	Jr	Raleigh, NC
G	10	Sviatoslav Mykhailiuk	6 ft 8 in (2.03 m)	205 lb (93 kg)	Jr	Cherkasy, Ukraine
G	11	Josh Jackson	6 ft 8 in (2.03 m)	207 lb (94 kg)	Fr	Southfield, MI
G	12	Tucker Vang (W)	6 ft 2 in (1.88 m)	180 lb (82 kg)	Jr	Goddard, KS
G	14	Malik Newman (redshirt)	6 ft 3 in (1.91 m)	190 lb (86 kg)	So	Jackson, MS
F	15	Carlton Bragg Jr.	6 ft 10 in (2.08 m)	240 lb (109 kg)	So	Cleveland, OH
G	20	Tyler Self	6 ft 2 in (1.88 m)	170 lb (77 kg)	RS Sr	Lawrence, KS
G	21	Clay Young	6 ft 5 in (1.96 m)	205 lb (93 kg)	RS Jr	Lansing, KS
F	22	Dwight Coleby Jr.	6 ft 9 in (2.06 m)	240 lb (109 kg)	RS Jr	Nassau, Bahamas
F	33	Landen Lucas	6 ft 10 in (2.08 m)	250 lb (113 kg)	RS Sr	Portland, OR
C	35	Udoka Azubuike (injured)	7 ft 0 in (2.13 m)	280 lb (127 kg)	Fr	Delta, Nigeria
F	44	Mitch Lightfoot	6 ft 8 in (2.03 m)	210 lb (95 kg)	Fr	Gilbert, AZ
C	55	Evan Maxwell (redshirt)	6 ft 10 in (2.08 m)	235 lb (107 kg)	Jr	Clarks Summit, PA

Head coach

- Bill Self (Oklahoma State)

Assistant coach(es)

- Norm Roberts (Queens (NY))
- Kurtis Townsend (Western Kentucky)
- Jerrance Howard (Illinois)

Legend

- (C) Team captain
- (S) Suspended
- (I) Ineligible
- (W) Walk-on
- Injured
- Current redshirt

Roster
Last update: July 18, 2016

== Schedule and results ==
Date time, TV	Rank^{#}	Opponent^{#}	Result	Record	High points	High rebounds	High assists	Site (attendance) city, state
Exhibition
November 1, 2016*; 7:00 pm, Jayhawk TV/ESPN3	No. 3	Washburn	W 92–74		21 – Mason III	10 – Mason III	9 – Mason III	Allen Fieldhouse (16,300); Lawrence, KS
November 6, 2016*; 7:00 pm, Jayhawk TV/ESPN3	No. 3	Emporia State	W 104–62		17 – Mason III	7 – 3 tied	5 – 2 tied	Allen Fieldhouse (16,300); Lawrence, KS
Regular season
November 11, 2016*; 8:00 pm, ESPN	No. 3	vs. No. 11 Indiana; Armed Forces Classic	L 99–103 ^{OT}	0–1	30 – Mason III	7 – 2 tied	9 – Mason III	Stan Sheriff Center (9,475); Honolulu, HI
November 15, 2016*; 8:30 pm, ESPN	No. 7	vs. No. 1 Duke; Champions Classic	W 77–75	1–1	21 – Mason III	12 – Azubuike	5 – Mason III	Madison Square Garden (19,812); New York, NY
November 18, 2016*; 7:00 pm, Jayhawk TV/ESPN3	No. 7	Siena; CBE Hall of Fame Classic	W 86–65	2–1	18 – Mason III	11 – Bragg Jr.	9 – Graham	Allen Fieldhouse (16,300); Lawrence, KS
November 21, 2016*; 8:30 pm, ESPN2	No. 5	vs. UAB; CBE Hall of Fame Classic	W 83–63	3–1	22 – Jackson	7 – 2 tied	7 – Graham	Sprint Center (10,071); Kansas City, MO
November 22, 2016*; 9:00 pm, ESPN2	No. 5	vs. Georgia; CBE Hall of Fame Classic	W 65–54	4–1	19 – Mason III	11 – Jackson	3 – 2 tied	Sprint Center (12,147); Kansas City, MO
November 25, 2016*; 7:00 pm, Jayhawk TV/ESPN3	No. 5	UNC Asheville; CBE Hall of Fame Classic	W 95–57	5–1	21 – Mason III	9 – Vick	11 – Graham	Allen Fieldhouse (16,300); Lawrence, KS
November 29, 2016*; 7:00 pm, Jayhawk TV/ESPN3	No. 4	Long Beach State	W 91–61	6–1	23 – Vick	7 – Azubuike	8 – Mason III	Allen Fieldhouse (16,300); Lawrence, KS
December 3, 2016*; 2:30 pm, ESPN	No. 4	Stanford	W 89–74	7–1	20 – Mason III	6 – Bragg Jr.	5 – Mason III	Allen Fieldhouse (16,300); Lawrence, KS
December 6, 2016*; 7:00 pm, Jayhawk TV/ESPN3	No. 3	UMKC	W 105–62	8–1	30 – Mason III	12 – Jackson	5 – 2 tied	Allen Fieldhouse (16,300); Lawrence, KS
December 10, 2016*; 2:15 pm, ESPN	No. 3	Nebraska	W 89–72	9–1	18 – Mason III	7 – Lucas	7 – Mason III	Allen Fieldhouse (16,300); Lawrence, KS
December 17, 2016*; 6:00 pm, ESPN2	No. 3	Davidson; Jayhawk Shootout	W 89–71	10–1	18 – 2 tied	8 – 3 tied	7 – Mason III	Sprint Center (17,820); Kansas City, MO
December 22, 2016*; 8:00 pm, CBSSN	No. 3	at UNLV	W 71–53	11–1	21 – Jackson	12 – Lucas	8 – Mason III	Thomas & Mack Center (14,116); Paradise, NV
December 30, 2016; 8:00 pm, ESPN2	No. 3	at TCU	W 86–80	12–1 (1–0)	22 – Mason III	18 – Lucas	7 – Mason III	Schollmaier Arena (6,579); Fort Worth, TX
January 3, 2017; 8:00 pm, ESPN2	No. 3	Kansas State; Sunflower Showdown	W 90–88	13–1 (2–0)	22 – Jackson	12 – Lucas	6 – 2 tied	Allen Fieldhouse (16,300); Lawrence, KS
January 7, 2017; 6:15 pm, ESPN2	No. 3	Texas Tech	W 85–68	14–1 (3–0)	26 – Mason III	10 – Jackson	4 – 2 tied	Allen Fieldhouse (16,300); Lawrence, KS
January 10, 2017; 8:00 pm, ESPN2	No. 2	at Oklahoma	W 81–70	15–1 (4–0)	28 – Mason III	13 – Lucas	5 – 2 tied	Lloyd Noble Center (9,788); Norman, OK
January 14, 2017; 1:00 pm, ESPN2	No. 2	Oklahoma State	W 87–80	16–1 (5–0)	22 – Mason III	12 – Lucas	4 – 2 tied	Allen Fieldhouse (16,300); Lawrence, KS
January 16, 2017; 8:00 pm, ESPN	No. 2	at Iowa State	W 76–72	17–1 (6–0)	16 – Mason III	8 – Jackson	8 – Graham	Hilton Coliseum (14,384); Ames, IA
January 21, 2017; 1:00 pm, CBS	No. 2	Texas	W 79–67	18–1 (7–0)	18 – Graham	14 – Lucas	7 – Mason III	Allen Fieldhouse (16,300); Lawrence, KS
January 24, 2017; 6:00 pm, ESPN	No. 2	at No. 18 West Virginia	L 69–85	18–2 (7–1)	22 – Jackson	10 – Lucas	7 – Mykhailiuk	WVU Coliseum (13,694); Morgantown, WV
January 28, 2017*; 5:15 pm, ESPN	No. 2	at No. 4 Kentucky; Big 12/SEC Challenge	W 79–73	19–2	21 – Mason III	10 – Jackson	4 – Mason III	Rupp Arena (24,418); Lexington, KY
February 1, 2017; 8:00 pm, ESPN2	No. 3	No. 2 Baylor	W 73–68	20–2 (8–1)	23 – Jackson	11 – 2 tied	6 – Mason III	Allen Fieldhouse (16,300); Lawrence, KS
February 4, 2017; 1:00 pm, ESPN	No. 3	Iowa State	L 89–92 ^{OT}	20–3 (8–2)	32 – Mason III	18 – Lucas	5 – Mason III	Allen Fieldhouse (16,300); Lawrence, KS
February 6, 2017; 8:00 pm, ESPN	No. 3	at Kansas State; Sunflower Showdown	W 74–71	21–3 (9–2)	21 – Mason III	7 – Lucas	6 – Graham	Bramlage Coliseum (12,528); Manhattan, KS
February 11, 2017; 1:00 pm, ESPN	No. 3	at Texas Tech	W 80–79	22–3 (10–2)	31 – Jackson	11 – Jackson	6 – Graham	United Supermarkets Arena (13,806); Lubbock, TX
February 13, 2017; 8:00 pm, ESPN	No. 3	No. 9 West Virginia	W 84–80 ^{OT}	23–3 (11–2)	24 – Mason III	11 – Jackson	5 – Mason III	Allen Fieldhouse (16,300); Lawrence, KS
February 18, 2017; 12:00 pm, CBS	No. 3	at No. 4 Baylor	W 67–65	24–3 (12–2)	23 – Mason III	7 – 2 tied	8 – Mason III	Ferrell Center (10,021); Waco, TX
February 22, 2017; 6:00 pm, ESPN2	No. 3	TCU	W 87–68	25–3 (13–2)	20 – Mason III	11 – Jackson	7 – Graham	Allen Fieldhouse (16,300); Lawrence, KS
February 25, 2017; 5:00 pm, ESPN	No. 3	at Texas	W 77–67	26–3 (14–2)	18 – Jackson	8 – Lucas	5 – Jackson	Frank Erwin Center (14,111); Austin, TX
February 27, 2017; 8:00 pm, ESPN	No. 1	Oklahoma	W 73–63	27–3 (15–2)	23 – Mason III	12 – Jackson	6 – Mason III	Allen Fieldhouse (16,300); Lawrence, KS
March 4, 2017; 5:00 pm, ESPN	No. 1	at Oklahoma State	W 90–85	28–3 (16–2)	27 – Mason III	9 – Jackson	9 – Mason III	Gallagher-Iba Arena (13,611); Stillwater, OK
Big 12 Tournament
March 9, 2017; 1:30 pm, ESPN2	(1) No. 1	vs. (8) TCU; Quarterfinals	L 82–85	28–4	29 – Mason III	14 – Lucas	6 – Mason III	Sprint Center (18,643); Kansas City, MO
NCAA tournament
March 17, 2017*; 5:50 pm, TNT	(1 MW) No. 3	vs. (16 MW) UC Davis; First Round	W 100–62	29–4	22 – Mason III	11 – Lucas	8 – Mason III	BOK Center (14,715); Tulsa, OK
March 19, 2017*; 4:15 pm, CBS	(1 MW) No. 3	vs. (9 MW) Michigan State; Second Round	W 90–70	30–4	23 – Jackson	11 – Lucas	4 – 2 tied	BOK Center (15,299); Tulsa, OK
March 23, 2017*; 8:39 pm, CBS	(1 MW) No. 3	vs. (4 MW) No. 15 Purdue; Sweet Sixteen	W 98–66	31–4	26 – 2 tied	12 – Jackson	7 – Mason III	Sprint Center (18,475); Kansas City, MO
March 25, 2017*; 7:49 pm, TBS	(1 MW) No. 3	vs. (3 MW) No. 9 Oregon; Elite Eight	L 60–74	31–5	21 – Mason III	12 – Jackson	5 – Mason III	Sprint Center (18,643); Kansas City, MO
*Non-conference game. ^{#}Rankings from AP Poll. (#) Tournament seedings in parentheses. MW=Midwest Region. All times are in Central Time.

== Rankings ==
Ranking movements Legend: ██ Increase in ranking ██ Decrease in ranking ( ) = First-place votes
	Week																				
Poll	Pre	1	2	3	4	5	6	7	8	9	10	11	12	13	14	15	16	17	18	19	Final
AP	3	7	5	4	3	3	3	3	3	2 (8)	2 (32)	2 (28)	3 (9)	3	3	3	3 (1)	1 (58)	1 (59)	3	Not released
Coaches	2 (1)	8	6	5	3 (1)	3 (1)	3 (1)	3 (1)	2 (1)	2 (9)	1 (23)	1 (18)	2 (7)	3	3	3	3	1 (23)	1 (27)	3 (2)	4

== Post-season awards ==
Bill Self

- Big 12 Coach of the Year

Frank Mason III

- Big 12 Player of the Year
- 1st team All-Big 12
- Consensus National Player of the year
- Consensus 1st Team All-American
- Bob Cousy Point Guard of the Year award

Josh Jackson

- Big 12 Freshman of the Year
- 1st team All-Big 12
- Big 12 All-Newcomer Team
- 2nd Team All-American (SN)
- 3rd team All-American (NABC, AP)

Devonte' Graham

- 2nd team All-Big 12

Landen Lucas

- Honorable Mention All-Big 12

Primary source, unless otherwise noted:
