= 2016–17 Iowa State Cyclones men's basketball team =

American college basketball season

2016–17 Iowa State Cyclones men's basketball

Big 12 tournament champions

NCAA tournament, Second Round
- Conference: Big 12 Conference

Ranking
- Coaches: No. 25
- AP: No. 16
- Record: 24–11 (12–6 Big 12)
- Head coach: Steve Prohm (2nd season)
- Assistant coaches: William Small; Daniyal Robinson; Neill Berry
- Home arena: Hilton Coliseum

2016–17 Big 12 men's basketball standings
	Conf.				Overall
Team	W		L	PCT	W		L	PCT
No. 3 Kansas	16	–	2	.889	31	–	5	.861
No. 13 West Virginia	12	–	6	.667	28	–	9	.757
No. 12 Baylor	12	–	6	.667	27	–	8	.771
No. 16 Iowa State †	12	–	6	.667	24	–	11	.686
Oklahoma State	9	–	9	.500	20	–	13	.606
Kansas State	8	–	10	.444	21	–	14	.600
Texas Tech	6	–	12	.333	18	–	14	.563
TCU	6	–	12	.333	24	–	15	.615
Oklahoma	5	–	13	.278	11	–	20	.355
Texas	4	–	14	.222	11	–	22	.333
† 2017 Big 12 Tournament winner Rankings from AP poll

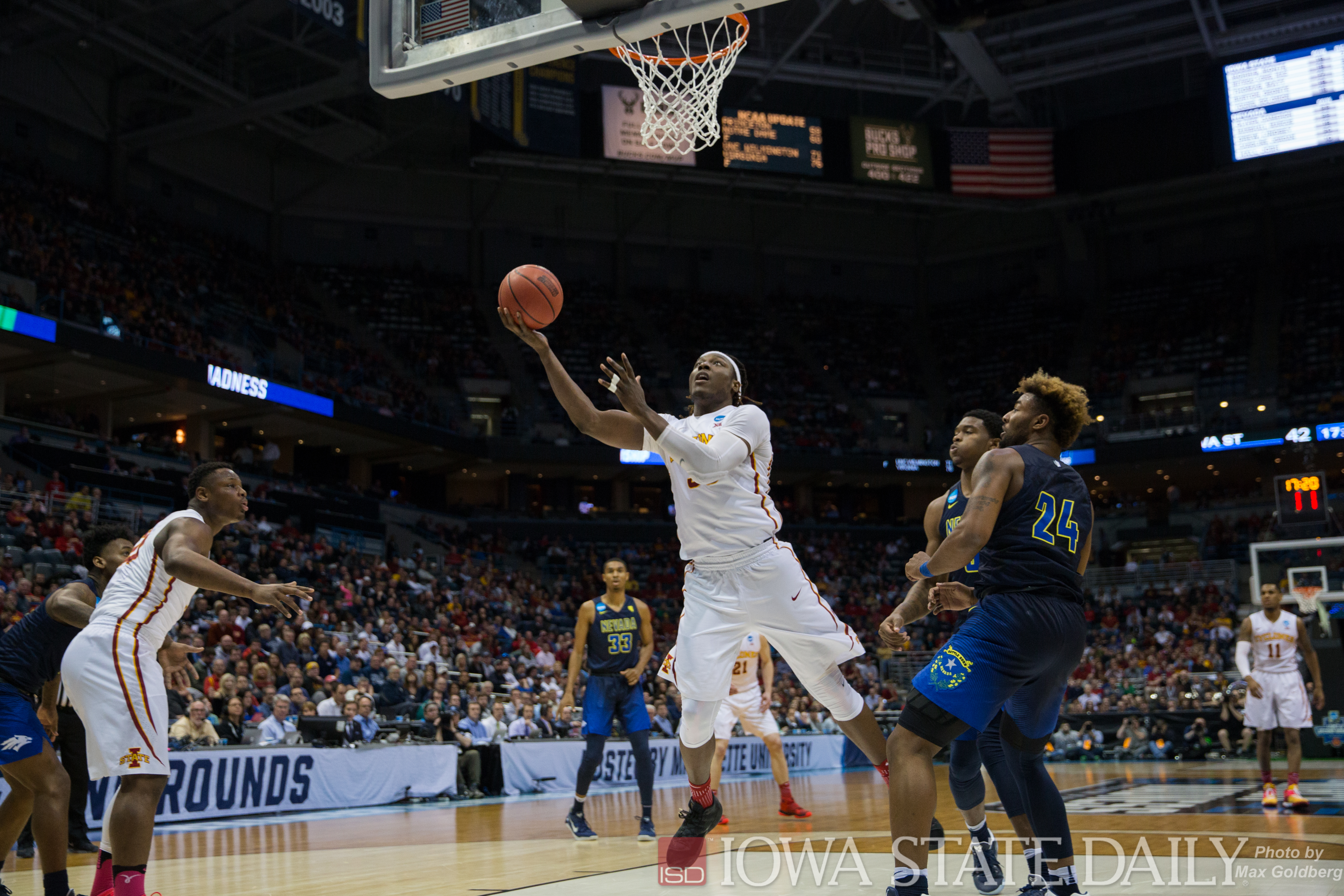
Vs. Nevada in NCAA tournament

The 2016–17 Iowa State Cyclones men's basketball team represented Iowa State University during the 2016–17 NCAA Division I men's basketball season. The Cyclones were coached by Steve Prohm, who was in his second season. They played their home games at Hilton Coliseum in Ames, Iowa as members of the Big 12 Conference. They finished the season 24–11, 12–6 in Big 12 play to finish in a three-way tie for second place. In the Big 12 tournament, they defeated Oklahoma State, TCU, and West Virginia to win the tournament championship. As a result, they received the conference's automatic bid to the NCAA tournament. As the No. 5 seed in the Midwest region, they defeated Nevada in the first round before losing to Purdue in the second round.

== Previous season ==
The Cyclones finished the 2015–16 season 23–12, 10–8 in Big 12 play to finish in a tie for fifth place. They lost to Oklahoma in the quarterfinals of the Big 12 tournament. They received an at-large bid to the NCAA tournament, where they defeated Iona and Arkansas–Little Rock to advance to the Sweet Sixteen, where they lost to Virginia.

=== Offseason departures ===
Offseason departures
Name	Position	Reason
Georges Niang	Forward	Graduated/NBA draft
Abdel Nader	Forward	Graduated/NBA draft
Jameel McKay	Center	Graduated
Hallice Cooke	Guard	Transferred to Nevada
Jordan Ashton	Guard	Transferred to Northern Iowa
Brady Ernst	Forward	Transferred to Indian Hills CC

== Recruiting ==
=== Prep recruits ===
College recruiting
Name	Hometown	School	Height	Weight	Commit date
Jakolby Long; SG #24	Mustang, Oklahoma	Mustang	6 ft 5 in (1.96 m)	210 lb (95 kg)	Oct 9, 2015
Jakolby Long; SG #24	Recruit ratings: Scout: Rivals: 247Sports: ESPN: (82)				
Cameron Lard; PF #28	Natchitoches, Louisiana	Pro Vision Academy	6 ft 9 in (2.06 m)	210 lb (95 kg)	Nov 22, 2015
Cameron Lard; PF #28	Recruit ratings: Scout: Rivals: 247Sports: ESPN: (80)				
Solomon Young; PF #72	Sacramento, California	Sacramento	6 ft 8 in (2.03 m)	235 lb (107 kg)	Aug 31, 2015
Solomon Young; PF #72	Recruit ratings: Scout: Rivals: 247Sports: ESPN: (69)				
Overall recruit ranking: Scout: NR Rivals: NR 247Sports: 38 ESPN: 39
Note: In many cases, Scout, Rivals, 247Sports, On3, and ESPN may conflict in their listings of height and weight.; In these cases, the average was taken. ESPN grades are on a 100-point scale.; Sources: "Iowa State 2016 Basketball Commitments". Rivals.; "2016 Iowa State Basketball Commits". Scout.; "ESPN". ESPN.; "Scout.com Team Recruiting Rankings". Scout.; "2016 Team Ranking". Rivals.

=== Incoming transfers ===
Incoming transfers
Name	Position	Hometown	Previous school	Remaining eligibility	Notes
Darrell Bowie	Forward	Milwaukee	Northern Illinois	1	Bowie was eligible to play immediately.
Merrill Holden	Forward	Lincoln, Nebraska	Louisiana Tech	1	Holden was eligible to play immediately.
Donovan Jackson	Guard	Milwaukee	Iowa Western CC	2	Jackson was eligible to play immediately.
Ray Kasongo	Forward	Toronto	Tennessee	2	Kasongo sat out the 2016–17 season due to NCAA eligibility rules.

== Roster ==
2016–17 Iowa State Cyclones men's basketball team
Players
Coaches

Pos.	#	Name	Height	Weight	Year	Previous school	Hometown
F	00	Simeon Carter	6 ft 8 in (2.03 m)	215 lb (98 kg)	So	West Charlotte	Charlotte, North Carolina
G	1	Nick Weiler-Babb	6 ft 5 in (1.96 m)	205 lb (93 kg)	RS So	James Martin; Arkansas	Arlington, Texas
F	2	Cameron Lard (redshirt)	6 ft 9 in (2.06 m)	220 lb (100 kg)	Fr	Pro Vision Academy	Natchitoches, Louisiana
F	3	Ray Kasongo (redshirt)	6 ft 9 in (2.06 m)	245 lb (111 kg)	Jr	Pikeville/Phase 1 Academy; Tennessee/CSI	Toronto
G	4	Donovan Jackson	6 ft 2 in (1.88 m)	175 lb (79 kg)	Jr	Pius XI; Iowa Western CC	Milwaukee
F	5	Merrill Holden	6 ft 8 in (2.03 m)	215 lb (98 kg)	Sr	Lincoln; Louisiana Tech/Pratt CC	Chicago
F	10	Darrell Bowie	6 ft 8 in (2.03 m)	210 lb (95 kg)	RS Sr	La Jolla; Northern Illinois	Milwaukee
G	11	Monté Morris	6 ft 3 in (1.91 m)	175 lb (79 kg)	Sr	Beecher	Flint, Michigan
G	13	Jakolby Long	6 ft 5 in (1.96 m)	207 lb (94 kg)	Fr	Mustang	Mustang, Oklahoma
G	15	Naz Mitrou-Long (C)	6 ft 4 in (1.93 m)	210 lb (95 kg)	RS Sr	Findlay Prep	Mississauga, Ontario
G	21	Matt Thomas	6 ft 4 in (1.93 m)	197 lb (89 kg)	Sr	Onalaska	Onalaska, Wisconsin
G	23	Wes Greder (W)	6 ft 5 in (1.96 m)	185 lb (84 kg)	RS So	Gilbert	Ames, Iowa
C	24	Stuart Nezlek (W)	6 ft 10 in (2.08 m)	245 lb (111 kg)	Sr	Fenwick	Oak Park, Illinois
G	30	Deonte Burton	6 ft 4 in (1.93 m)	250 lb (113 kg)	RS Sr	Vincent; Marquette	Milwaukee
F	33	Solomon Young	6 ft 8 in (2.03 m)	235 lb (107 kg)	Fr	Sacramento	Sacramento, California

Head coach

- Steve Prohm (Alabama)

Assistant coach(es)

- William Small (Belhaven)
- Daniyal Robinson (Little Rock)
- Neill Berry (Southeastern Louisiana)

Legend

- (C) Team captain
- (S) Suspended
- (I) Ineligible
- (W) Walk-on
- Injured
- Current redshirt

Roster

== Schedule and results ==
Date time, TV	Rank^{#}	Opponent^{#}	Result	Record	High points	High rebounds	High assists	Site (attendance) city, state
Exhibition
November 6, 2016*; 6:00 pm, Cyclones.TV	No. 24	Sioux Falls	W 101–57	0-0	24 – Mitrou-Long	9 – Burton	5 – Morris	Hilton Coliseum (14,034); Ames, Iowa
Regular season
November 11, 2016*; 7:00 pm, Cyclones.TV	No. 24	Savannah State	W 113–71	1–0	21 – Morris	10 – Mitrou-Long	11 – Morris	Hilton Coliseum (14,384); Ames, Iowa
November 14, 2016*; 7:00 pm, Cyclones.TV	No. 20	Mount St. Mary's	W 73–55	2–0	18 – Morris	13 – Burton	4 – Jackson	Hilton Coliseum (13,981); Ames, Iowa
November 20, 2016*; 1:00 pm, Cyclones.TV	No. 20	The Citadel	W 130–63	3–0	26 – Mitrou-Long	10 – Morris	10 – Morris	Hilton Coliseum (14,228); Ames, Iowa
November 24, 2016*; 11:30 am, ESPN2	No. 21	vs. Indiana State; AdvoCare Invitational quarterfinals	W 73–71	4–0	20 – Morris	11 – Bowie	1 – Tied	HP Field House (2,436); Lake Buena Vista, Florida
November 25, 2016*; 10:00 am, ESPN2	No. 21	vs. Miami (FL); AdvoCare Invitational semifinals	W 73–56	5–0	21 – Burton	7 – Burton	5 – Morris	HP Field House (1,876); Lake Buena Vista, Florida
November 27, 2016*; 12:30 pm, ESPN	No. 21	vs. No. 11 Gonzaga; AdvoCare Invitational championship	L 71–73	5–1	29 – Burton	12 – Burton	9 – Morris	HP Field House (2,305); Lake Buena Vista, Florida
December 1, 2016*; 8:00 pm, ESPN	No. 19	Cincinnati	L 54–55 ^{OT}	5–2	15 – Morris	8 – Burton	2 – Morris	Hilton Coliseum (14,384); Ames, Iowa
December 5, 2016*; 7:00 pm, Cyclones.TV	No. 25	Omaha	W 91–47	6–2	20 – Burton	7 – Thomas	9 – Morris	Hilton Coliseum (14,005); Ames, Iowa
December 8, 2016*; 7:00 pm, ESPN2	No. 25	at Iowa; Iowa Corn Cy-Hawk Series	L 64–78	6–3	14 – Thomas	8 – Burton	5 – Morris	Carver–Hawkeye Arena (13,956); Iowa City, Iowa
December 17, 2016*; 6:00 pm, Mediacom		vs. Drake; Big Four Classic	W 97–80	7–3	37 – Mitrou-Long	10 – Burton	5 – Mitrou-Long	Wells Fargo Arena (15,028); Des Moines, Iowa
December 20, 2016*; 6:00 pm, Cyclones.TV		Mississippi Valley State	W 88–60	8–3	23 – Thomas	9 – Burton	6 – Jackson	Hilton Coliseum (13,692); Ames, Iowa
December 30, 2016; 5:00 pm, ESPNews		Texas Tech	W 63–56	9–3 (1–0)	19 – Mitrou-Long	5 – Bowie	6 – Morris	Hilton Coliseum (14,384); Ames, Iowa
January 4, 2017; 7:00 pm, ESPNews		at No. 2 Baylor	L 63–65	9–4 (1–1)	17 – Mitrou-Long	7 – Morris	5 – Morris	Ferrell Center (7,582); Waco, Texas
January 7, 2017; 8:15 pm, ESPN2		Texas	W 79–70	10–4 (2–1)	27 – Burton	10 – Morris	6 – Morris	Hilton Coliseum (14,384); Ames, Iowa
January 11, 2017; 8:00 pm, ESPNU		at Oklahoma State	W 96–86	11–4 (3–1)	30 – Morris	6 – Mitrou-Long	5 – Morris	Gallagher-Iba Arena (6,066); Stillwater, Oklahoma
January 14, 2017; 4:30 pm, FSN		at TCU	L 77–84	11–5 (3–2)	19 – Mitrou-Long	5 – Tied	8 – Morris	Schollmaier Arena (6,564); Fort Worth, Texas
January 16, 2017; 8:00 pm, ESPN		No. 2 Kansas	L 72–76	11–6 (3–3)	23 – Morris	7 – Tied	7 – Morris	Hilton Coliseum (14,384); Ames, Iowa
January 21, 2017; 1:00 pm, ESPN		at Oklahoma	W 92–87 ^{2OT}	12–6 (4–3)	31 – Burton	7 – Holden	8 – Morris	Lloyd Noble Center (9,673); Norman, Oklahoma
January 24, 2017; 8:00 pm, ESPNU		Kansas State	W 70–65	13–6 (5–3)	25 – Thomas	6 – Tied	4 – Tied	Hilton Coliseum (14,384); Ames, Iowa
January 28, 2017*; 3:00 pm, ESPN2		at Vanderbilt; Big 12/SEC Challenge	L 78–84	13–7	25 – Morris	10 – Burton	4 – Mitrou-Long	Memorial Gymnasium (9,851); Nashville, Tennessee
January 31, 2017; 8:00 pm, ESPN2		No. 7 West Virginia	L 72–85	13–8 (5–4)	19 – Thomas	7 – Tied	10 – Burton	Hilton Coliseum (12,836); Ames, Iowa
February 4, 2017; 1:00 pm, ESPN		at No. 3 Kansas	W 92–89 ^{OT}	14–8 (6–4)	29 – Burton	8 – Burton	7 – Morris	Allen Fieldhouse (16,300); Lawrence, Kansas
February 7, 2017; 8:00 pm, ESPN2		at Texas	L 65–67	14–9 (6–5)	17 – Thomas	8 – Burton	7 – Morris	Frank Erwin Center (10,048); Austin, Texas
February 11, 2017; 5:00 pm, ESPN2		Oklahoma	W 80–64	15–9 (7–5)	23 – Mitrou-Long	6 – Mitrou-Long	9 – Morris	Hilton Coliseum (14,384); Ames, Iowa
February 15, 2017; 6:00 pm, ESPN2		at Kansas State	W 87–79	16–9 (8–5)	18 – Young	12 – Young	5 – Tied	Bramlage Coliseum (11,387); Manhattan, Kansas
February 18, 2017; 5:00 pm, ESPNews		TCU	W 84–71	17–9 (9–5)	29 – Mitrou-Long	7 – Mitrou-Long	11 – Morris	Hilton Coliseum (14,384); Ames, Iowa
February 20, 2017; 8:00 pm, ESPNU		at Texas Tech	W 82–80 ^{OT}	18–9 (10–5)	23 – Morris	8 – Young	6 – Morris	United Supermarkets Arena (8,389); Lubbock, Texas
February 25, 2017; 3:00 pm, ESPN		No. 9 Baylor	W 72–69	19–9 (11–5)	22 – Burton	3 – Burton	7 – Morris	Hilton Coliseum (14,384); Ames, Iowa
February 28, 2017; 8:00 pm, ESPN2	No. 24	Oklahoma State	W 86–83	20–9 (12–5)	25 – Thomas	9 – Morris	11 – Morris	Hilton Coliseum (14,384); Ames, Iowa
March 3, 2017; 6:00 pm, ESPN2	No. 24	at No. 10 West Virginia	L 76–87	20–10 (12–6)	22 – Long	6 – Long	5 – Morris	WVU Coliseum (14,528); Morgantown, West Virginia
Big 12 Tournament
March 9, 2017; 11:30 am, ESPNU	(4) No. 23	vs. (5) Oklahoma State; Quarterfinals	W 92–83	21–10	21 – Morris	10 – Morris, Burton	9 – Morris	Sprint Center (18,972); Kansas City, Missouri
March 10, 2017; 6:00 pm, ESPN2	(4) No. 23	vs. (8) TCU; Semifinals	W 84–63	22–10	22 – Burton	9 – Young	4 – Burton	Sprint Center (18,972); Kansas City, Missouri
March 11, 2017; 5:00 pm, ESPN	(4) No. 23	vs. (2) No. 11 West Virginia; Championship	W 80–74	23–10	17 – Morris	6 – Morris	3 – Morris	Sprint Center (19,700); Kansas City, Missouri
NCAA tournament
March 16, 2017; 10:03 pm, truTV	(5 MW) No. 16	vs. (12 MW) Nevada; First Round	W 84–73	24–10	19 – Morris	8 – Tied	8 – Morris	BMO Harris Bradley Center (18,025); Milwaukee
March 18, 2017; 8:45 pm, TBS	(5 MW) No. 16	vs. (4 MW) No. 15 Purdue; Second Round	L 76–80	24–11	25 – Burton	6 – Thomas	9 – Morris	BMO Harris Bradley Center (18,045); Milwaukee
*Non-conference game. ^{#}Rankings from AP poll. (#) Tournament seedings in parentheses. MW=Midwest Region. All times are in Central Time.

== Rankings ==
Ranking movements Legend: ██ Increase in ranking ██ Decrease in ranking — = Not ranked RV = Received votes
	Week																			
Poll	Pre	1	2	3	4	5	6	7	8	9	10	11	12	13	14	15	16	17	18	Final
AP	24	20	21	19	25	RV	RV	RV	RV	RV	RV	RV	RV	RV	—	RV	24	23	16	Not released
Coaches	RV	23	22	21	25	RV	—	—	—	RV	—	RV	—	RV	—	RV	24	24	20	25

*AP does not release post-NCAA tournament rankings.

== Awards and honors ==
- Big 12 Player of the Week

Monté Morris (November 21st)
Naz Mitrou-Long (December 19th)
Deonte Burton (February 6th)
Monté Morris (February 27th)
