= 2016–17 Iowa Hawkeyes men's basketball team =

American college basketball season

2016–17 Iowa Hawkeyes men's basketball

NIT, Second Round
- Conference: Big Ten Conference
- Record: 19–15 (10–8 Big Ten)
- Head coach: Fran McCaffery (7th season)
- Assistant coaches: Sherman Dillard; Andrew Francis; Kirk Speraw
- Home arena: Carver–Hawkeye Arena (Capacity: 15,400)

2016–17 Big Ten Conference men's basketball standings
	Conf.				Overall
Team	W		L	PCT	W		L	PCT
No. 15 Purdue	14	–	4	.778	27	–	8	.771
No. 25 Wisconsin	12	–	6	.667	27	–	10	.730
Maryland	12	–	6	.667	24	–	9	.727
Minnesota	11	–	7	.611	24	–	10	.706
No. 23 Michigan †	10	–	8	.556	26	–	12	.684
Northwestern	10	–	8	.556	24	–	12	.667
Michigan State	10	–	8	.556	20	–	15	.571
Iowa	10	–	8	.556	19	–	15	.559
Illinois	8	–	10	.444	20	–	15	.571
Ohio State	7	–	11	.389	17	–	15	.531
Indiana	7	–	11	.389	18	–	16	.529
Penn State	6	–	12	.333	15	–	18	.455
Nebraska	6	–	12	.333	12	–	19	.387
Rutgers	3	–	15	.167	15	–	18	.455
† 2017 Big Ten tournament winner Rankings from AP poll

The 2016–17 Iowa Hawkeyes men's basketball team represented the University of Iowa in the 2016–17 NCAA Division I men's basketball season. The team was led by seventh-year head coach Fran McCaffery and played their home games at Carver–Hawkeye Arena as members of the Big Ten Conference. They finished the season 19–15, 10–8 in Big Ten play to finish in a four-way tie for fifth place. They lost in the second round of the Big Ten tournament to Indiana. They were one of the last four teams not selected for the NCAA tournament and thus received a No. 1 seed in the National Invitation Tournament where they defeated South Dakota in the first round before losing to TCU in the second round.

== Previous season ==
The Hawkeyes finished 2015–16 season with a record of 22–11, 12–6 record in Big Ten play to finish in a four-way tie for third place in conference. In the Big Ten tournament, they were upset by Illinois in the second round. They received an at-large bid to the NCAA tournament where they defeated Temple in the First Round before losing to eventual National Champion, Villanova, in the Second Round.

== Departures ==
Name	Number	Pos.	Height	Weight	Year	Hometown	Notes
Andrew Fleming	2	G	6'5"	206	Freshman	Nashville, TN	Transferred to Chattanooga
Anthony Clemmons	5	G	6'2"	200	Senior	Lansing, MI	Graduated
Mike Gesell	10	G	6'2"	190	Senior	South Sioux City, NE	Graduated
Jarrod Uthoff	20	F	6'9"	221	Senior	Cedar Rapids, IA	Graduated
Okey Ukah	23	F	6'7"	218	Senior	Iowa City, IA	Walk on; graduated
Brandon Hutton	30	F	6'6"	215	Freshman	Chicago, IL	Transferred to Indian Hills CC
Adam Woodbury	34	C	7'1"	250	Senior	Sioux City, IA	Graduated

== 2016 recruiting class ==
College recruiting information
Name	Hometown	School	Height	Weight	Commit date
Tyler Cook #8 PF	St. Louis, MO	Chaminade College Prep School	6 ft 8 in (2.03 m)	240 lb (110 kg)	Sep 23, 2015
Tyler Cook #8 PF	Recruit ratings: Scout: Rivals: 247Sports: ESPN:				
Jordan Bohannon #25 PG	Marion, IA	Linn-Mar High School	6 ft 0 in (1.83 m)	170 lb (77 kg)	Aug 28, 2015
Jordan Bohannon #25 PG	Recruit ratings: Scout: Rivals: 247Sports: ESPN:				
Cordell Pemsl #41 PF	Dubuque, IA	Wahlert Catholic High School	6 ft 7 in (2.01 m)	230 lb (100 kg)	May 1, 2014
Cordell Pemsl #41 PF	Recruit ratings: Scout: Rivals: 247Sports: ESPN:				
Ryan Kriener; C	Spirit Lake, IA	Spirit Lake High School	6 ft 10 in (2.08 m)	240 lb (110 kg)	Jul 30, 2015
Ryan Kriener; C	Recruit ratings: Scout: Rivals: 247Sports: ESPN:				
Maishe Dailey; SG	Beachwoood, OH	Beachwood High School	6 ft 6 in (1.98 m)	180 lb (82 kg)	May 4, 2016
Maishe Dailey; SG	Recruit ratings: Scout: Rivals: 247Sports: ESPN:				
Overall recruit ranking:
Note: In many cases, Scout, Rivals, 247Sports, On3, and ESPN may conflict in their listings of height and weight.; In these cases, the average was taken. ESPN grades are on a 100-point scale.; Sources: "ESPN- Iowa Hawkeyes Men's Basketball Recruiting". ESPN.; "2016 Team Ranking". Rivals.

=== 2017 Recruiting Class ===
College recruiting information (2017)
Name	Hometown	School	Height	Weight	Commit date
Connor McCaffery; SG	Iowa City, IA	West High School	6 ft 5 in (1.96 m)	190 lb (86 kg)	Aug 30, 2014
Connor McCaffery; SG	Recruit ratings: Scout: Rivals: 247Sports: ESPN:				
Luka Garza; C	Washington, D.C.	Maret School	6 ft 11 in (2.11 m)	230 lb (100 kg)	Sep 10, 2016
Luka Garza; C	Recruit ratings: Scout: Rivals: 247Sports: ESPN:				
Jack Nunge; PF	Newburgh, IN	Castle High School	6 ft 9 in (2.06 m)	185 lb (84 kg)	Sep 11, 2016
Jack Nunge; PF	Recruit ratings: Scout: Rivals: 247Sports: ESPN:				
Overall recruit ranking:
Note: In many cases, Scout, Rivals, 247Sports, On3, and ESPN may conflict in their listings of height and weight.; In these cases, the average was taken. ESPN grades are on a 100-point scale.; Sources: "ESPN- Iowa Hawkeyes Men's Basketball Recruiting". ESPN.; "2017 Team Ranking". Rivals.

=== 2018 Recruiting Class ===
College recruiting information (2018)
Name	Hometown	School	Height	Weight	Commit date
Joe Wieskamp; SG	Muscatine, IA	Muscatine High School	6 ft 5 in (1.96 m)	195 lb (88 kg)	Jun 9, 2015
Joe Wieskamp; SG	Recruit ratings: Scout: Rivals: 247Sports: ESPN:				
Overall recruit ranking:
Note: In many cases, Scout, Rivals, 247Sports, On3, and ESPN may conflict in their listings of height and weight.; In these cases, the average was taken. ESPN grades are on a 100-point scale.; Sources: "ESPN- Iowa Hawkeyes Men's Basketball Recruiting". ESPN.; "2018 Team Ranking". Rivals.

== Roster ==
2016–17 Iowa Hawkeyes men's basketball team
Players
Coaches

Pos.	#	Name	Height	Weight	Year	Previous school	Hometown
F	0	Ahmad Wagner	6 ft 7 in (2.01 m)	235 lb (107 kg)	So	Wayne High School	Yellow Springs, Ohio
G	1	Maishe Dailey	6 ft 6 in (1.98 m)	183 lb (83 kg)	Fr	Beachwood High School	Beachwood, Ohio
G	3	Jordan Bohannon	6 ft 0 in (1.83 m)	182 lb (83 kg)	Fr	Linn-Mar High School	Marion, Iowa
G	4	Isaiah Moss	6 ft 5 in (1.96 m)	205 lb (93 kg)	RS Fr	Simeon Academy	Chicago, Illinois
F	5	Tyler Cook	6 ft 9 in (2.06 m)	253 lb (115 kg)	Fr	Chaminade Prep	St. Louis, Missouri
G	10	Christian Williams	6 ft 5 in (1.96 m)	200 lb (91 kg)	So	St. Teresa High School	Decatur, Illinois
F	11	Charlie Rose (W)	6 ft 4 in (1.93 m)	185 lb (84 kg)	Jr	York Community High School	Elmhurst, Illinois
G	14	Peter Jok	6 ft 6 in (1.98 m)	205 lb (93 kg)	Sr	Valley High School	West Des Moines, Iowa
F	15	Ryan Kriener	6 ft 9 in (2.06 m)	247 lb (112 kg)	Fr	Spirit Lake High School	Spirit Lake, Iowa
F	20	Riley Till (W)	6 ft 6 in (1.98 m)	192 lb (87 kg)	Fr	Wahlert Catholic High School	Dubuque, Iowa
F	23	Dale Jones	6 ft 7 in (2.01 m)	227 lb (103 kg)	Sr	Tyler Junior College	Waterloo, Iowa
G	24	Brady Ellingson	6 ft 4 in (1.93 m)	193 lb (88 kg)	RS So	Sussex Hamilton High School	Menomonee Falls, Wisconsin
F	25	Dom Uhl	6 ft 9 in (2.06 m)	217 lb (98 kg)	Jr	Point Pleasant Beach High School	Frankfurt, Germany
F	35	Cordell Pemsl	6 ft 8 in (2.03 m)	249 lb (113 kg)	Fr	Wahlert Catholic High School	Dubuque, Iowa
F	51	Nicholas Baer	6 ft 7 in (2.01 m)	205 lb (93 kg)	RS So	Bettendorf High School	Bettendorf, Iowa

Head coach

- Fran McCaffery (Penn)

Assistant coach(es)

- Sherman Dillard (James Madison)
- Andrew Francis (Southampton)
- Kirk Speraw (Iowa)

Legend

- (C) Team captain
- (S) Suspended
- (I) Ineligible
- (W) Walk-on
- Injured
- Current redshirt

Roster

== Schedule and results ==
Date time, TV	Rank^{#}	Opponent^{#}	Result	Record	High points	High rebounds	High assists	Site (attendance) city, state
Exhibition
11/04/2016*; 7:00 pm		Regis	W 95–73		28 – Jok	7 – Baer	5 – Williams	Carver–Hawkeye Arena (11,152); Iowa City, IA
Non-conference regular season
11/11/2016*; 8:30 pm, BTN+		Kennesaw State	W 91–74	1–0	27 – Jok	10 – Cook	5 – Williams	Carver–Hawkeye Arena (13,007); Iowa City, IA
11/13/2016*; 2:30 pm, BTN+		Savannah State; Emerald Coast Classic	W 116–84	2–0	23 – Ellingson	9 – Pemsl, Wagner	7 – Bohannon	Carver–Hawkeye Arena (11,371); Iowa City, IA
11/17/2016*; 8:00 pm, BTN		Seton Hall; Gavitt Tipoff Games	L 83–91	2–1	30 – Jok	11 – Jok	4 – Jok	Carver–Hawkeye Arena (10,391); Iowa City, IA
11/20/2016*; 4:30 pm, BTN+		Texas–Rio Grande Valley; Emerald Coast Classic	W 95–67	3–1	27 – Jok	7 – Baer	6 – Bohannon	Carver–Hawkeye Arena (11,596); Iowa City, IA
11/25/2016*; 6:00 pm, CBSSN		vs. No. 7 Virginia; Emerald Coast Classic semifinals	L 41–74	3–2	13 – Jok	6 – Baer, Cook	2 – Baer, Cook, Jok, Wagner	The Arena at NWFSC (2,196); Niceville, FL
11/26/2016*; 3:00 pm		vs. Memphis; Emerald Coast Classic 3rd Place game	L 92–100	3–3	42 – Jok	7 – Cook	6 – Bohannon	The Arena at NWFSC (2,196); Niceville, FL
11/29/2016*; 8:00 pm, ESPN2		at Notre Dame; ACC–Big Ten Challenge	L 78–92	3–4	23 – Bohannon	12 – Baer	7 – Bohannon	Edmund P. Joyce Center (7,660); South Bend, IN
12/03/2016*; 1:00 pm, BTN+		Omaha	L 89–98	3–5	33 – Jok	10 – Jok	6 – Bohannon	Carver–Hawkeye Arena (11,618); Iowa City, IA
12/05/2016*; 6:00 pm, ESPNU		Stetson	W 95–68	4–5	21 – Moss, Pemsl	8 – Jok, Pemsl	7 – Jok	Carver–Hawkeye Arena (9,839); Iowa City, IA
12/08/2016*; 7:00 pm, ESPN2		No. 25 Iowa State; Iowa Corn Cy-Hawk Series	W 78–64	5–5	23 – Jok	9 – Jok	4 – Bohannon	Carver–Hawkeye Arena (13,956); Iowa City, IA
12/17/2016*; 3:30 pm, ESPN3		vs. Northern Iowa; Big Four Classic	W 69–46	6–5	21 – Jok	11 – Baer	5 – Bohannon	Wells Fargo Arena (15,028); Des Moines, IA
12/20/2016*; 8:00 pm, BTN		North Dakota	W 84–73	7–5	18 – Bohannon, Jok	11 – Pemsl	4 – Jok	Carver–Hawkeye Arena (11,099); Iowa City, IA
12/22/2016*; 8:00 pm, BTN		Delaware State	W 89–57	8–5	17 – Jok	7 – Dailey	5 – Bohannon	Carver–Hawkeye Arena (11,886); Iowa City, IA
Big Ten regular season
12/28/2016; 7:30 pm, BTN		at No. 15 Purdue	L 67–89	8–6 (0–1)	13 – Jok	7 – Baer	4 – Bohannon	Mackey Arena (14,804); West Lafayette, IN
01/01/2017; 1:15 pm, BTN		Michigan	W 86–83 ^{OT}	9–6 (1–1)	25 – Jok	8 – Cook, Pemsl	6 – Bohannon	Carver–Hawkeye Arena (13,988); Iowa City, IA
01/05/2017; 8:00 pm, BTN		at Nebraska	L 90–93 ^{2OT}	9–7 (1–2)	34 – Jok	9 – Baer	3 – Bohannon	Pinnacle Bank Arena (14,939); Lincoln, NE
01/08/2017; 3:30 pm, BTN		Rutgers	W 68–62	10–7 (2–2)	18 – Jok	11 – Jok	8 – Bohannon	Carver–Hawkeye Arena (11,347); Iowa City, IA
01/12/2017; 8:00 pm, BTN		No. 17 Purdue	W 83–78	11–7 (3–2)	29 – Jok	10 – Baer	9 – Bohannon	Carver–Hawkeye Arena (10,752); Iowa City, IA
01/15/2017; 6:30 pm, BTN		at Northwestern	L 54–89	11–8 (3–3)	14 – Cook, Kriener	5 – Cook	5 – Wagner	Welsh-Ryan Arena (7,732); Evanston, IL
01/19/2017; 6:00 pm, ESPN		No. 25 Maryland	L 76–84	11–9 (3–4)	14 – Jok	7 – Cook	5 – Bohannon	Carver–Hawkeye Arena (11,040); Iowa City, IA
01/25/2017; 8:00 pm, BTN		at Illinois	L 64–76	11–10 (3–5)	12 – Baer, Wagner	7 – Baer	4 – Bohannon	State Farm Center (11,787); Champaign, IL
01/28/2017; 7:00 pm, ESPN2		Ohio State	W 85–72	12–10 (4–5)	17 – Ellingson	8 – Baer	5 – Uhl, Pemsl	Carver–Hawkeye Arena (15,138); Iowa City, IA
01/31/2017; 6:00 pm, BTN		at Rutgers	W 83–63	13–10 (5–5)	17 – Bohannon	7 – Pemsl	5 – Baer, Ellingson	Louis Brown Athletic Center (4,389); Piscataway, NJ
02/05/2017; 1:00 pm, BTN		Nebraska	W 81–70	14–10 (6–5)	15 – Bohannon	6 – Baer	5 – Ellingson, Jok	Carver–Hawkeye Arena (13,495); Iowa City, IA
02/08/2017; 8:00 pm, BTN		at Minnesota	L 89–101 ^{2OT}	14–11 (6–6)	28 – Jok	9 – Jok	8 – Bohannon	Williams Arena (11,481); Minneapolis, MN
02/11/2017; 5:00 pm, BTN		at Michigan State	L 66–77	14–12 (6–7)	13 – Cook, Jok	7 – Pemsl	3 – Williams	Breslin Center (14,797); East Lansing, MI
02/18/2017; 1:00 pm, BTN		Illinois	L 66–70	14–13 (6–8)	16 – Jok	10 – Jok	4 – Jok	Carver–Hawkeye Arena (15,400); Iowa City, IA
02/21/2017; 8:00 pm, ESPN		Indiana	W 96–90 ^{OT}	15–13 (7–8)	35 – Jok	7 – Baer	6 – Bohannon	Carver–Hawkeye Arena (11,372); Iowa City, IA
02/25/2017; 5:00 pm, ESPN2		at No. 24 Maryland	W 83–69	16–13 (8–8)	24 – Bohannon	10 – Cook	5 – Bohannon	Xfinity Center (17,615); College Park, MD
03/02/2017; 8:00 pm, ESPN		at No. 22 Wisconsin	W 59–57	17–13 (9–8)	14 – Baer	8 – Cook	5 – Bohannon	Kohl Center (17,287); Madison, WI
03/05/2017; 12:00 pm, BTN		Penn State	W 90–79	18–13 (10–8)	21 – Jok	10 – Baer, Cook	6 – Williams	Carver–Hawkeye Arena (15,400); Iowa City, IA
Big Ten tournament
03/09/2017; 5:30 pm, ESPN2	(7)	vs. (10) Indiana; Second Round	L 73–95	18–14	24 – Bohannon	11 – Pemsl	10 – Bohannon	Verizon Center (12,408); Washington, D.C.
NIT
03/15/2017*; 8:00 pm, ESPN2	(1)	(8) South Dakota; First Round – Iowa Bracket	W 87–75	19–14	20 – Jok	8 – Cook	11 – Bohannon	Carver-Hawkeye Arena (12,864); Iowa City, IA
03/19/2017*; 4:00 pm, ESPN2	(1)	(4) TCU; Second Round – Iowa Bracket	L 92–94 ^{OT}	19–15	25 – Bohannon	10 – Baer	13 – Bohannon	Carver-Hawkeye Arena (15,400); Iowa City, IA
*Non-conference game. ^{#}Rankings from AP Poll. (#) Tournament seedings in parentheses. All times are in Central Time.

- Source: Schedule
