= 2016–17 Oklahoma Sooners men's basketball team =

American college basketball season

2016–17 Oklahoma Sooners men's basketball
- Conference: Big 12 Conference
- Record: 11–20 (5–13 Big 12)
- Head coach: Lon Kruger (6th season)
- Assistant coaches: Chris Crutchfield; Carlin Hartman; Kevin Kruger
- Home arena: Lloyd Noble Center

2016–17 Big 12 men's basketball standings
	Conf.				Overall
Team	W		L	PCT	W		L	PCT
No. 3 Kansas	16	–	2	.889	31	–	5	.861
No. 13 West Virginia	12	–	6	.667	28	–	9	.757
No. 12 Baylor	12	–	6	.667	27	–	8	.771
No. 16 Iowa State †	12	–	6	.667	24	–	11	.686
Oklahoma State	9	–	9	.500	20	–	13	.606
Kansas State	8	–	10	.444	21	–	14	.600
Texas Tech	6	–	12	.333	18	–	14	.563
TCU	6	–	12	.333	24	–	15	.615
Oklahoma	5	–	13	.278	11	–	20	.355
Texas	4	–	14	.222	11	–	22	.333
† 2017 Big 12 Tournament winner Rankings from AP poll

The 2016–17 Oklahoma Sooners basketball team represented the University of Oklahoma in the 2016–17 NCAA Division I men's basketball season. The Sooners were led by Lon Kruger in his sixth season. They played their home games at the Lloyd Noble Center in Norman, Oklahoma as a member of the Big 12 Conference. They finished the season 11–20, 5–13 in Big 12 play to finish in ninth place. They lost in the first round of the Big 12 tournament to TCU.

== Previous season ==
The Sooners finished the 2015–16 season 29–8, 12–6 in Big 12 play to finish in third place in conference. They defeated Oklahoma State in the quarterfinals of the Big 12 tournament before losing to West Virginia in the semifinals. The Sooners received an at-large bid to the NCAA tournament where they defeated Cal State Bakersfield, VCU, Texas A&M, and Oregon to advance to the Final Four for the fifth time in school history. At the Final Four, they lost in the national semifinal to the eventual champion Villanova by 44 points, the largest margin in Final Four history.

Following the season, senior guard and player of the year winner Buddy Hield graduated and was selected as the sixth overall pick in the NBA draft by the New Orleans Pelicans.

== Departures ==
Name	Number	Pos.	Height	Weight	Year	Hometown	Notes
Ryan Spangler	00	F	6'8"	234	RS Senior	Bridge Creek, OK	Graduated
Dinjiyl Walker	2	G	6'1"	203	Senior	Vaughan, ON	Graduated
Isaiah Cousins	11	G	6'4"	200	Senior	Mount Vernon, NY	Graduated/2016 NBA draft
Bola Alade	14	G	6'4"	193	RS Freshman	Plano, TX	Walk-on; transferred to Texas–San Antonio
Buddy Hield	24	G	6'3"	214	Senior	Eight Mile Rock, Bahamas	Graduated/2016 NBA draft
Akolda Manyang	30	C	7'0"	243	Junior	Rochester, MN	Dismissed from the team due to felony assault; transferred to Utah Valley
Austin Mankin	41	F	6'7"	210	Junior	Coppell, TX	Graduate transferred to Harding

=== Incoming transfers ===
Name	Number	Pos.	Height	Weight	Year	Hometown	Previous School
Darrion Strong	0	G	6'2"	180	Junior	Chicago, IL	Junior college transfer from Coffeyville Community College

== Recruits ==
College recruiting information
Name	Hometown	School	Height	Weight	Commit date
Kameron McGusty #10 SG	Katy, TX	Sunrise Christian Academy (KS)	6 ft 5 in (1.96 m)	165 lb (75 kg)	Jul 20, 2015
Kameron McGusty #10 SG	Recruit ratings: Scout: Rivals: 247Sports: ESPN:				
Kristian Doolittle #17 PF	Edmond, OK	Edmond Memorial High School	6 ft 8 in (2.03 m)	215 lb (98 kg)	Dec 2, 2014
Kristian Doolittle #17 PF	Recruit ratings: Scout: Rivals: 247Sports: ESPN:				
Matt Freeman; PF	Auckland, New Zealand	Westlake High School	6 ft 9 in (2.06 m)	200 lb (91 kg)	Aug 6, 2015
Matt Freeman; PF	Recruit ratings: Scout: Rivals: 247Sports: ESPN:				
Jordan Shepherd; PG	Asheville, NC	Asheville Christian Academy	6 ft 3 in (1.91 m)	175 lb (79 kg)	Aug 6, 2015
Jordan Shepherd; PG	Recruit ratings: Scout: Rivals: 247Sports: ESPN:				
Overall recruit ranking:
Note: In many cases, Scout, Rivals, 247Sports, On3, and ESPN may conflict in their listings of height and weight.; In these cases, the average was taken. ESPN grades are on a 100-point scale.; Sources: "Oklahoma 2016 Basketball Commitments". Rivals.; "2016 Oklahoma Basketball Commits". Scout.; "ESPN". ESPN.; "Scout.com Team Recruiting Rankings". Scout.; "2016 Team Ranking". Rivals.

=== 2017 Recruits ===
College recruiting information (2017)
Name	Hometown	School	Height	Weight	Commit date
Trae Young #4 PG	Norman, OK	Norman North High School	6 ft 2 in (1.88 m)	180 lb (82 kg)	Feb 16, 2016
Trae Young #4 PG	Recruit ratings: Scout: Rivals: 247Sports: ESPN: (93)				
Brady Manek #30 PF	Harrah, OK	Harrah High School	6 ft 9 in (2.06 m)	235 lb (107 kg)	Oct 22, 2015
Brady Manek #30 PF	Recruit ratings: Scout: Rivals: 247Sports: ESPN: (81)				
Hannes Polla; C	Lathi, Finland	Helsinki Basketball Academy (FI)	6 ft 11 in (2.11 m)	265 lb (120 kg)	Sep 8, 2016
Hannes Polla; C	Recruit ratings: Scout: Rivals: 247Sports: ESPN: (80)				
Overall recruit ranking:
Note: In many cases, Scout, Rivals, 247Sports, On3, and ESPN may conflict in their listings of height and weight.; In these cases, the average was taken. ESPN grades are on a 100-point scale.; Sources: "Oklahoma 2017 Basketball Commitments". Rivals.; "2017 Oklahoma Basketball Commits". Scout.; "ESPN". ESPN.; "Scout.com Team Recruiting Rankings". Scout.; "2017 Team Ranking". Rivals.

== Roster ==
2016–17 Oklahoma Sooners men's basketball team
Players
Coaches

Pos.	#	Name	Height	Weight	Year	Previous school	Hometown
G	0	Darrion Strong	6 ft 1 in (1.85 m)	180 lb (82 kg)	Jr	Coffeyville CC	Chicago, IL
F	1	Rashard Odomes	6 ft 6 in (1.98 m)	200 lb (91 kg)	So	Copperas Cove	Copperas Cove, TX
G	3	Christian James	6 ft 4 in (1.93 m)	218 lb (99 kg)	So	Bellaire	Houston, TX
C	4	Jamuni McNeace	6 ft 10 in (2.08 m)	215 lb (98 kg)	RS So	Allen	Allen, TX
F	5	Matt Freeman (redshirt)	6 ft 10 in (2.08 m)	217 lb (98 kg)	Fr	Westlake Boys	Auckland, New Zealand
G	10	Jordan Woodard	6 ft 0 in (1.83 m)	187 lb (85 kg)	Sr	Edmond Memorial	Arcadia, OK
F	11	Kristian Doolittle	6 ft 7 in (2.01 m)	215 lb (98 kg)	Fr	Edmond Memorial	Edmond, OK
F	12	Khadeem Lattin	6 ft 9 in (2.06 m)	208 lb (94 kg)	Jr	Redemption Christian Homeschool	Houston, TX
G	13	Jordan Shepherd	6 ft 2 in (1.88 m)	175 lb (79 kg)	Fr	Asheville Christian	Asheville, NC
G	15	Grant Quinn (W)	6 ft 4 in (1.93 m)	185 lb (84 kg)	Fr	Liberty Christian	Argyle, TX
G	20	Kameron McGusty	6 ft 5 in (1.96 m)	170 lb (77 kg)	Fr	Sunrise Christian	Katy, TX
F	21	Dante Buford	6 ft 7 in (2.01 m)	221 lb (100 kg)	RS So	Arlington Country Day	Jacksonville, FL
G	22	Daniel Harper (W)	6 ft 1 in (1.85 m)	190 lb (86 kg)	RS Sr	Norman	Norman, OK
F	25	C. J. Cole (W)	6 ft 7 in (2.01 m)	245 lb (111 kg)	RS Sr	Sperry	Sperry, OK
F	30	Marshall Thrope (W)	6 ft 9 in (2.06 m)	235 lb (107 kg)	RS Fr	Bishop Kelley	Tulsa, OK

Head coach

- Lon Kruger (Kansas State)

Assistant coach(es)

- Chris Crutchfield (Omaha)
- Carlin Hartman (Tulane)
- Kevin Kruger (Arizona State)

Legend

- (C) Team captain
- (S) Suspended
- (I) Ineligible
- (W) Walk-on
- Injured
- Current redshirt

Roster

== Schedule ==
Date time, TV	Rank^{#}	Opponent^{#}	Result	Record	Site (attendance) city, state
Exhibition
11/08/2016*; 7:00 pm, SSTV		Washburn	W 84–64		Lloyd Noble Center (7,789); Norman, OK
Regular season
11/13/2016*; 4:00 pm, SSTV		Northwestern State	W 97–61	1–0	Lloyd Noble Center (8,456); Norman, OK
11/17/2016*; 6:00 pm, ESPNU		vs. Tulane; Tire Pros Invitational quarterfinals	W 89–70	2–0	HP Field House; Orlando, FL
11/18/2016*; 6:30 pm, ESPNU		vs. Northern Iowa; Tire Pros Invitational semifinals	L 67–73 ^{OT}	2–1	HP Field House; Orlando, FL
11/20/2016*; 4:00 pm, ESPNU		vs. Clemson; Tire Pros Invitational 3rd place game	W 70–64	3–1	HP Field House; Orlando, FL
11/25/2016*; 2:00 pm, SSTV		Abilene Christian	W 72–64	4–1	Lloyd Noble Center (9,303); Norman, OK
11/29/2016*; 7:00 pm, SSTV		Northern Colorado	W 87–67	5–1	Lloyd Noble Center (7,579); Norman, OK
12/03/2016*; 12:00 pm, BTN		at No. 17 Wisconsin	L 70–90	5–2	Kohl Center (17,287); Madison, WI
12/07/2016*; 7:00 pm, SSTV		Oral Roberts	W 92–66	6–2	Lloyd Noble Center; Norman, OK
12/10/2016*; 3:00 pm, ESPN2		vs. Wichita State; All-College Basketball Classic	L 73–76	6–3	Chesapeake Energy Arena (11,157); Oklahoma City, OK
12/17/2016*; 11:30 am, CBS		Memphis	L 94–99 ^{OT}	6–4	Lloyd Noble Center (9,081); Norman, OK
12/21/2016*; 7:30 pm, CBSSN		vs. Auburn; Basketball Hall of Fame's Birthday of Basketball	L 70–74	6–5	Mohegan Sun Arena (3,462); Uncasville, CT
12/30/2016; 6:00 pm, ESPN2		No. 4 Baylor	L 50–76	6–6 (0–1)	Lloyd Noble Center (10,254); Norman, OK
01/03/2017; 8:00 pm, ESPNU		at TCU	L 57–60	6–7 (0–2)	Schollmaier Arena (5,576); Fort Worth, TX
01/07/2017; 2:00 pm, ESPNews		at Kansas State	L 64–75	6–8 (0–3)	Bramlage Coliseum (12,295); Manhattan, KS
01/10/2017; 8:00 pm, ESPN2		No. 2 Kansas	L 70–81	6–9 (0–4)	Lloyd Noble Center (9,788); Norman, OK
01/14/2017; 7:30 pm, ESPNU		Texas Tech	W 84–75	7–9 (1–4)	Lloyd Noble Center (8,601); Norman, OK
01/18/2017; 6:00 pm, ESPN2		at No. 7 West Virginia	W 89–87 ^{OT}	8–9 (2–4)	WVU Coliseum (11,895); Morgantown, WV
01/21/2017; 1:00 pm, ESPN		Iowa State	L 87–92	8–10 (2–5)	Lloyd Noble Center (9,673); Norman, OK
01/23/2017; 8:00 pm, ESPN		at Texas	L 83–84	8–11 (2–6)	Frank Erwin Center (10,898); Austin, TX
01/28/2017*; 1:00 pm, ESPN		No. 25 Florida; Big 12/SEC Challenge	L 52–84	8–12	Lloyd Noble Center (10,859); Norman, OK
01/30/2017; 8:00 pm, ESPN		Oklahoma State; Bedlam Series	L 66–68	8–13 (2–7)	Lloyd Noble Center (10,103); Norman, OK
02/04/2017; 6:00 pm, ESPNU		at Texas Tech	L 69–77	8–14 (2–8)	United Supermarkets Arena (10,194); Lubbock, TX
02/08/2017; 8:00 pm, ESPN		No. 13 West Virginia	L 50–61	8–15 (2–9)	Lloyd Noble Center (8,608); Norman, OK
02/11/2017; 5:00 pm, ESPN2		at Iowa State	L 64–80	8–16 (2–10)	Hilton Coliseum (14,384); Ames, IA
02/14/2017; 8:00 pm, ESPN2		Texas	W 70–66	9–16 (3–10)	Lloyd Noble Center (7,545); Norman, OK
02/18/2017; 7:00 pm, ESPNU		at Oklahoma State; Bedlam Series	L 92–96	9–17 (3–11)	Gallagher-Iba Arena (13,611); Stillwater, OK
02/21/2017; 6:00 pm, ESPN2		at No. 9 Baylor	L 54–60	9–18 (3–12)	Ferrell Center (6,135); Waco, TX
02/25/2017; 5:00 pm, ESPNU		Kansas State	W 81–51	10–18 (4–12)	Lloyd Noble Center (10,181); Norman, OK
02/27/2017; 8:00 pm, ESPN		at No. 1 Kansas	L 67-77	10–19 (4–13)	Allen Fieldhouse (16,300); Lawrence, KS
03/04/2017; 2:00 pm, ESPNews		TCU	W 73–68	11–19 (5–13)	Lloyd Noble Center (9,526); Norman, OK
Big 12 tournament
03/08/2017; 6:00 pm, ESPNU	(9)	vs. (8) TCU; First round	L 63–82	11–20	Sprint Center (18,972); Kansas City, MO
*Non-conference game. ^{#}Rankings from AP Poll. (#) Tournament seedings in parentheses. All times are in Central Time.

x- Sooner Sports Television (SSTV) is aired locally on Fox Sports. However the contract allows games to air on various affiliates. Those affiliates are FSSW, FSSW+, FSOK, FSOK+, and FCS Atlantic, Central, and Pacific.
