= 2016–17 Atlantic Coast Conference men's basketball season =

2016-17 Atlantic Coast Conference men's basketball season
- League: NCAA Division I
- Sport: Basketball
- Teams: 15
- TV partner(s): ACCN, ESPN, Raycom Sports, Regional Sports Networks, CBS

2016–17 NCAA Division I men's basketball season
- First place: North Carolina
- Season MVP: Justin Jackson, North Carolina
- Top scorer: Michael Young, Pittsburgh

ACC tournament
- Champions: Duke
- Finals MVP: Luke Kennard, Duke

Atlantic Coast Conference men's basketball seasons
- ← 2015–16 2017–18 →

2016–17 ACC men's basketball standings
	Conf.				Overall
Team	W		L	PCT	W		L	PCT
No. 5 North Carolina	14	–	4	.778	33	–	7	.825
No. 16 Florida State	12	–	6	.667	26	–	9	.743
No. 14 Notre Dame	12	–	6	.667	26	–	10	.722
No. 10 Louisville	12	–	6	.667	25	–	9	.735
No. 7 Duke †	11	–	7	.611	28	–	9	.757
No. 24 Virginia	11	–	7	.611	23	–	11	.676
Virginia Tech	10	–	8	.556	22	–	11	.667
Miami (FL)	10	–	8	.556	21	–	12	.636
Syracuse	10	–	8	.556	19	–	15	.559
Wake Forest	9	–	9	.500	19	–	14	.576
Georgia Tech	8	–	10	.444	21	–	16	.568
Clemson	6	–	12	.333	17	–	16	.515
NC State	0	–	14	.000	0	–	17	.000[3]
Pittsburgh	4	–	14	.222	16	–	17	.485
Boston College	2	–	16	.111	9	–	23	.281
† 2017 ACC tournament winner Rankings from AP poll

The 2016–17 Atlantic Coast Conference men's basketball season began with practices in October 2016, followed by the start of the 2016–17 NCAA Division I men's basketball season in November. Conference play started in late December 2016 and concluded in March.

With a win over Pittsburgh on February 25, 2017, North Carolina clinched at least a share of the ACC regular season championship for the second straight season, the eighth time in the 14 years under head coach Roy Williams, and the 31st time in school history. A loss by Duke later that day gave the Tar Heels the outright regular season championship.

The ACC tournament was held from March 7–11, 2-17 at the Barclays Center in Brooklyn, New York. Duke defeated Notre Dame to with the tournament championship. As a result, Duke received the conference's automatic bid to the NCAA tournament.

North Carolina forward Justin Jackson was named ACC Player of the Year. Georgia Tech head coach Josh Pastner was named Coach of the Year. Jackson was also named a consensus first-team All-American and Duke guard Luke Kennard was named a second team All-American.

Nine ACC schools (Duke, Florida State, Miami, North Carolina, Notre Dame, Virginia, Virginia Tech, and Wake Forest) received invitations to the NCAA tournament. The conference achieved an 11–8 record in the NCAA tournament, however only North Carolina won more than one game. North Carolina went on to with the NCAA Championship, defeating Gonzaga. Clemson, Georgia Tech, and Syracuse received bids to the National Invitation Tournament. The conference achieved a 5–3 record in the NIT, with Georgia Tech losing to TCU in the championship game.

== Head coaches ==
=== Coaching changes ===
- On March 21, 2016, Pittsburgh head coach Jamie Dixon left the school to take the head coaching position at his alma mater, TCU. On March 27, 2016, the school hired Kevin Stallings as head coach.
- On March 25, 2016, Georgia Tech announced Brian Gregory would not return as head coach. On April 8, 2016, the school hired Josh Pastner as head coach.

=== Coaches ===
Team	Head coach	Previous job	Years at school	Overall record	ACC record	ACC titles	NCAA tournaments	NCAA Final Fours	NCAA Championships
Boston College	Jim Christian	Ohio	3	29–67	6–48	0	0	0	0
Clemson	Brad Brownell	Wright State	7	124–103	56–66	0	1	0	0
Duke	Mike Krzyzewski	Army	37	998–271	399–166	12	33	12	5
Florida State	Leonard Hamilton	Washington Wizards	15	304–196	126–124	0	5	0	0
Georgia Tech	Josh Pastner	Memphis	1	21–16	8–10	0	0	0	0
Louisville	Rick Pitino	Boston Celtics	16	416–141	188–88	0	15	7	2
Miami	Jim Larrañaga	George Mason	6	139–69	64–42	1	3	1	0
North Carolina	Roy Williams	Kansas	14	398–115	169–65	8	12	9	3
NC State	Mark Gottfried	Alabama	6	123–86	48–58	0	4	0	0
Notre Dame	Mike Brey	Delaware	17	382–187	179–113	0	13	0	0
Pittsburgh	Kevin Stallings	Vanderbilt	1	16–17	4–14	0	0	0	0
Syracuse	Jim Boeheim	Syracuse (asst.)	40	903–354	361–218	0	32	5	1
Virginia	Tony Bennett	Washington State	8	188–83	88–50	2	5	0	0
Virginia Tech	Buzz Williams	Marquette	3	53–48	22–32	0	1	0	0
Wake Forest	Danny Manning	Tulsa	3	43–52	16–38	0	1	0	0

Notes:

- Year at school includes 2016–17 season.
- Overall and ACC records are from time at current school and are through the end the 2016–17 season.
- NCAA tournament appearances are from time at current school only.
- NCAA Final Fours and Championship include time at other schools

== Preseason ==
ACC recruits at the 2016 McDonald's All-American Boys Game

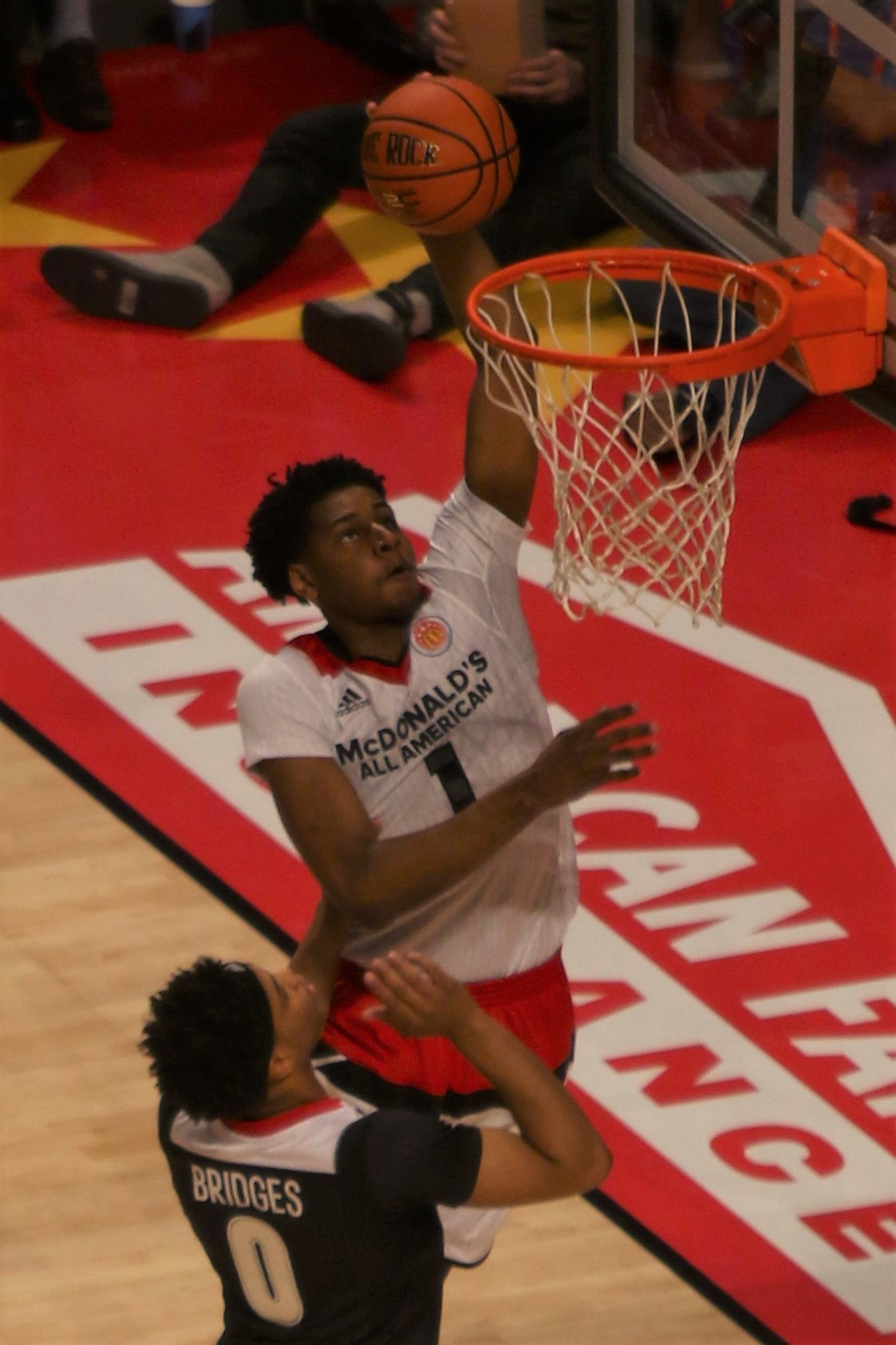
Marques Bolden, Duke

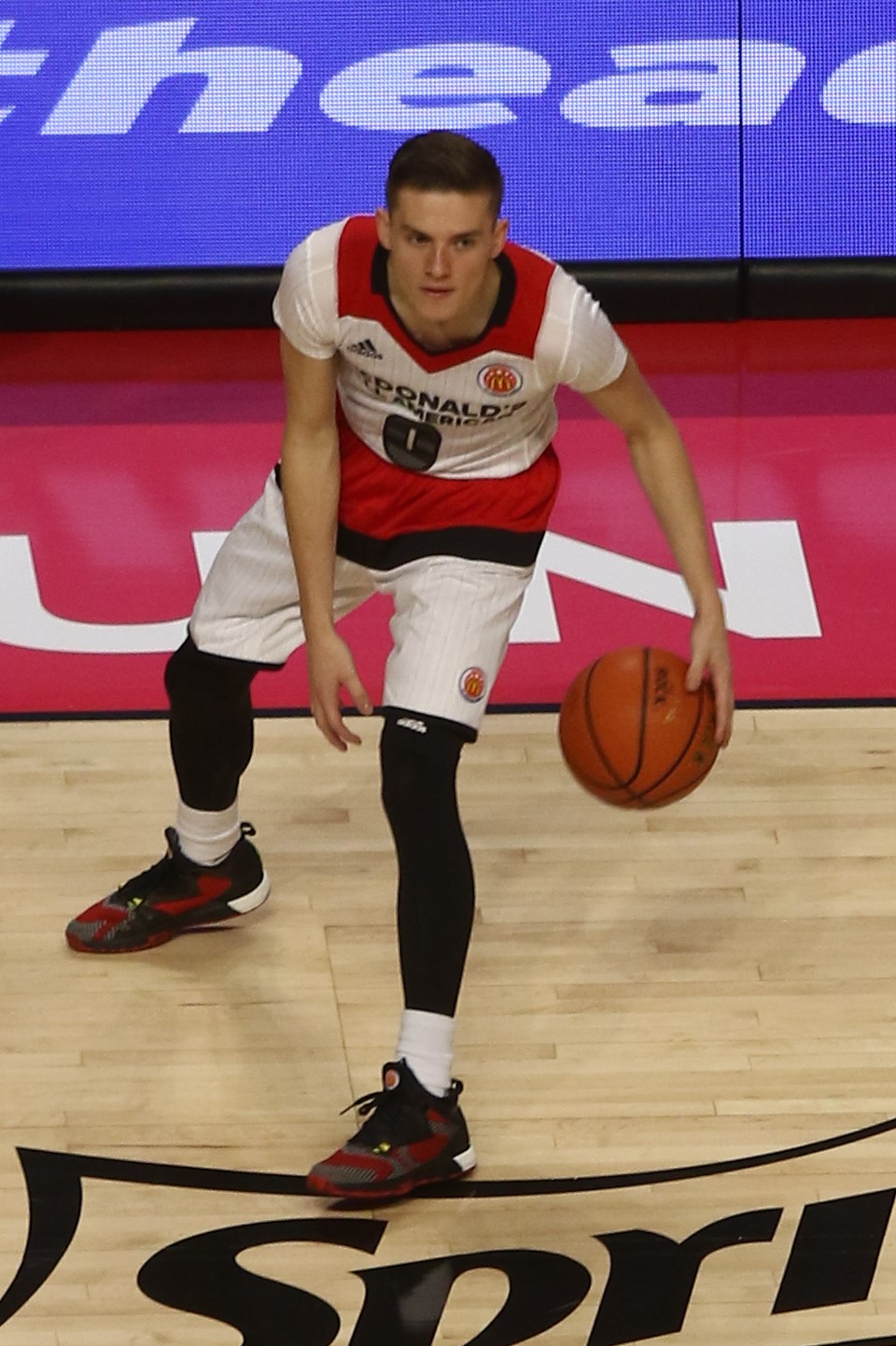
Kyle Guy, Virginia

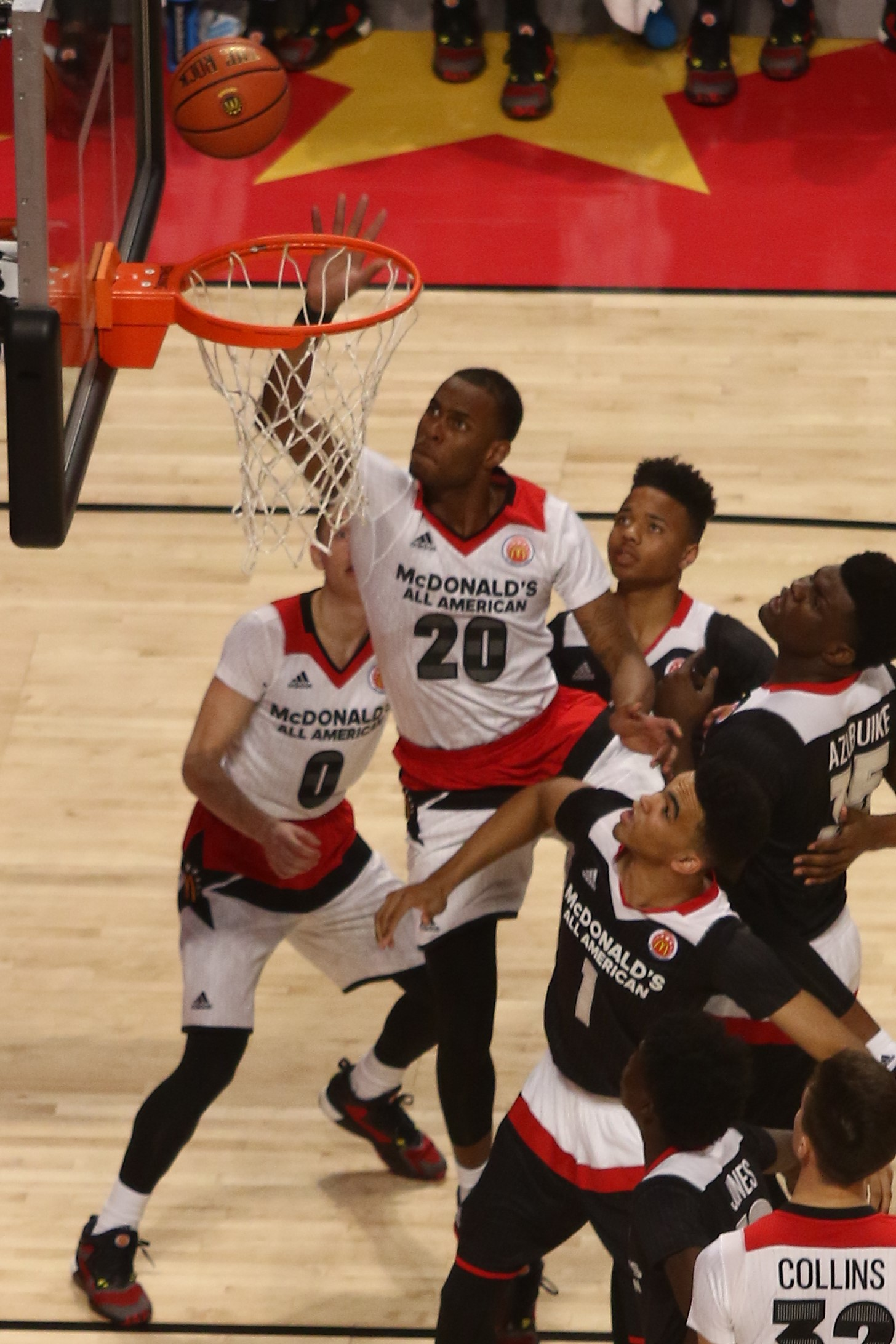
Dewan Huell, Miami

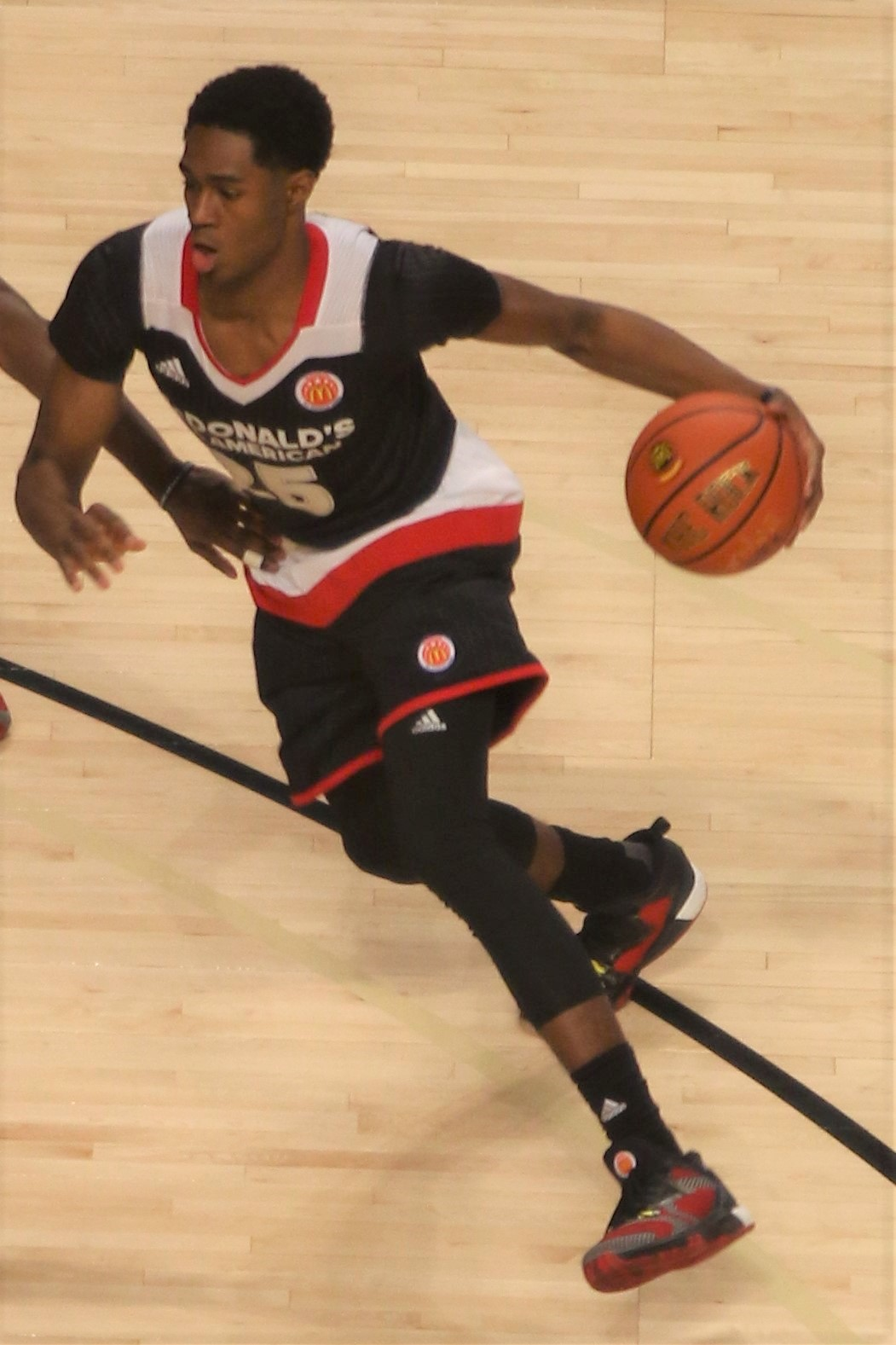
V. J. King, Louisville

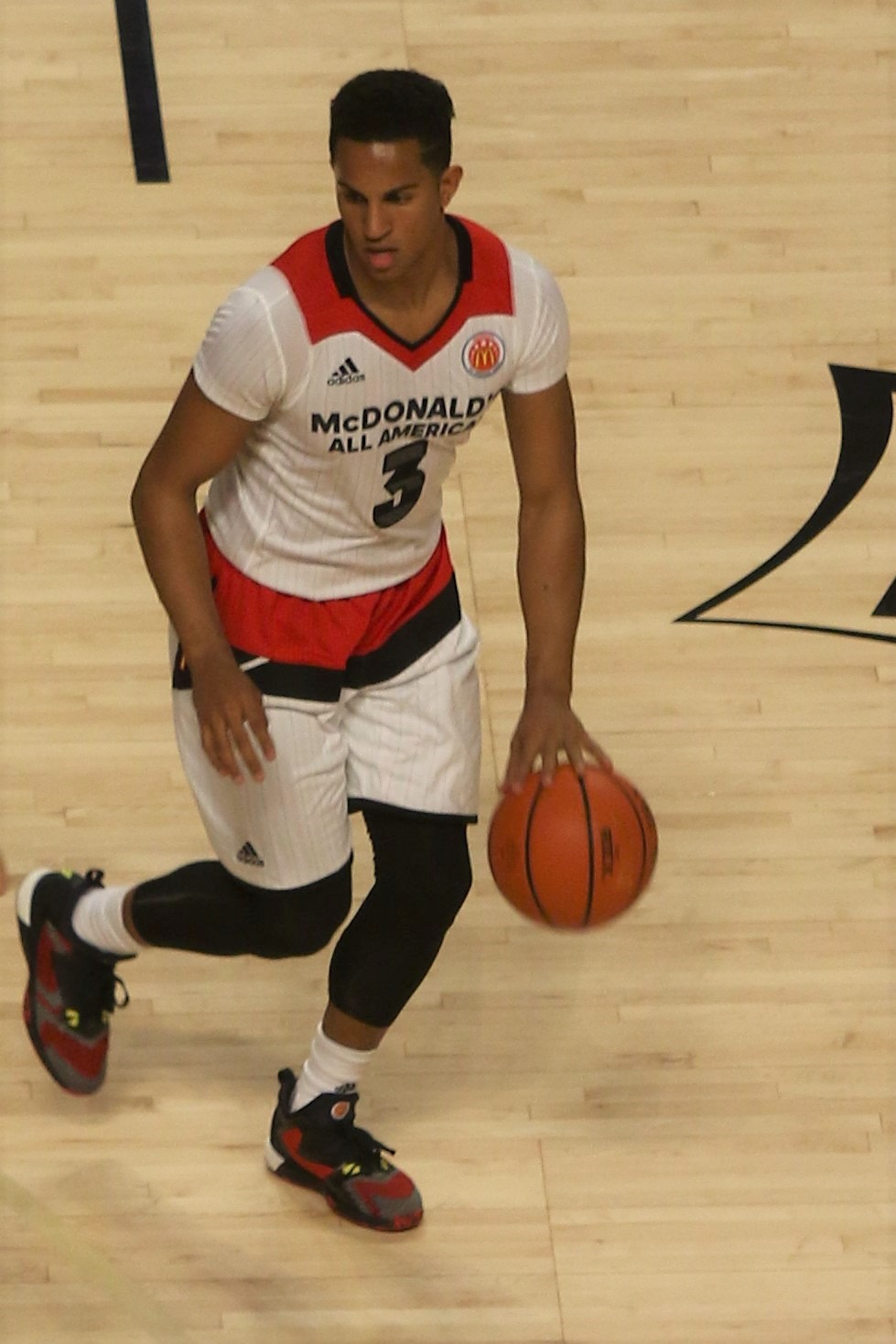
Frank Jackson, Duke

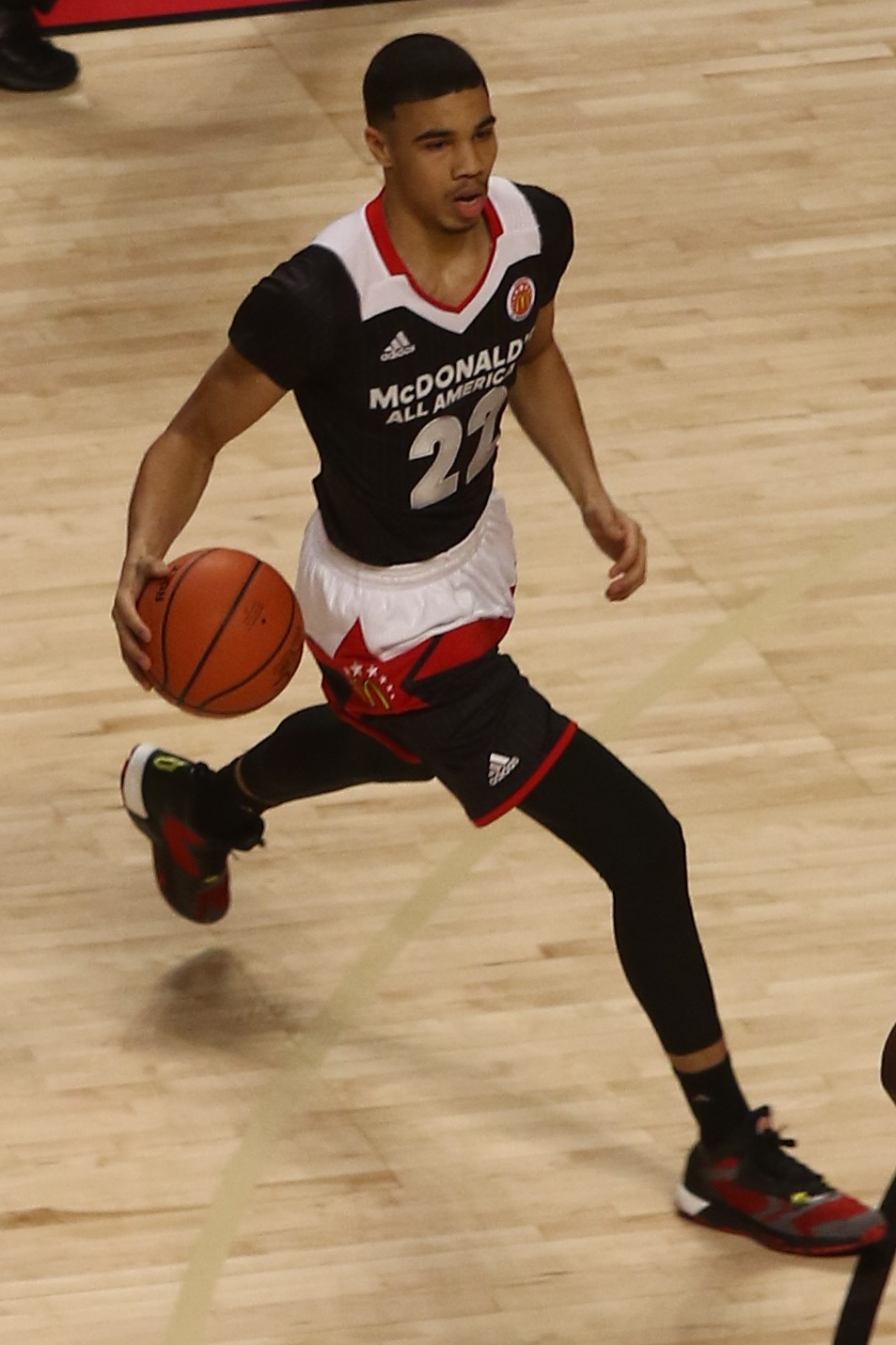
Jayson Tatum, Duke

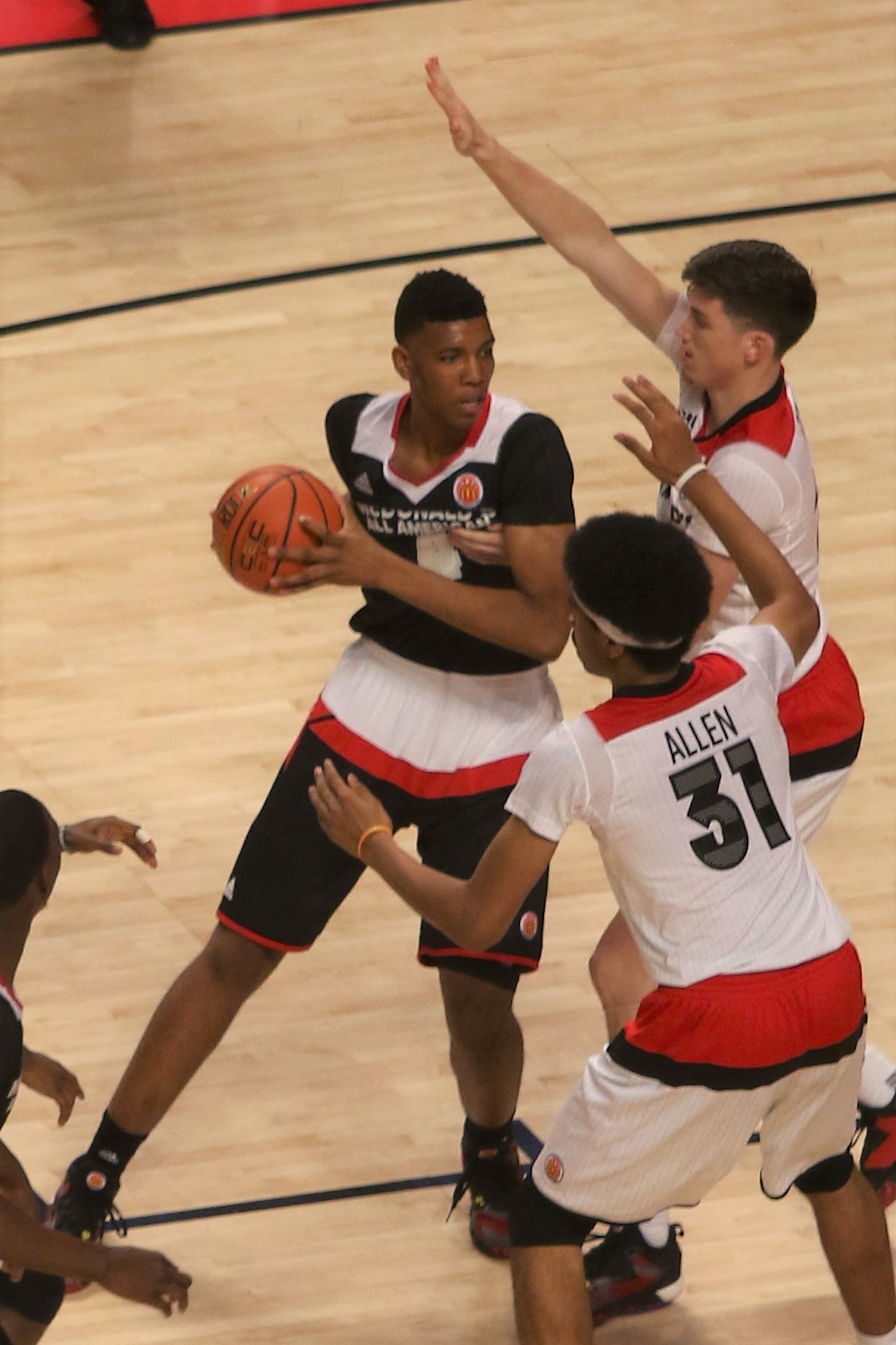
Tony Bradley, North Carolina

== Regular season ==
=== Rankings ===
Legend
Increase in ranking
Decrease in ranking
Not ranked previous week
First Place votes shown in ()

		Pre	Wk 2	Wk 3	Wk 4	Wk 5	Wk 6	Wk 7	Wk 8	Wk 9	Wk 10	Wk 11	Wk 12	Wk 13	Wk 14	Wk 15	Wk 16	Wk 17	Wk 18	Wk 19	Final
Boston College	AP																				
Boston College	C																				
Clemson	AP																				
Clemson	C																				
Duke	AP	1 (58)	1 (58)	6	5	5	5	5	5	8	7	18	17	21	18	12	10	17	14	7	
Duke	C	1 (27)	1 (27)	3 (5)	4 (2)	4 (2)	4 (1)	4 (1)	5 (1)	8	7	18	17	21	19	14	11	14	14	7	13
Florida State	AP	RV	RV	25	RV	RV	23	21	20	12	9	10	6	15	14	17	19	15	16	16	
Florida State	C	RV	RV	RV	RV	RV	23	22	20	13	10	12	8	16	15	18	20	17	17	18	24
Georgia Tech	AP																				
Georgia Tech	C																				
Louisville	AP	13	12	10	14	11	11	10	6	9	14	12	13	6	4	8	7	8	10	10	
Louisville	C	14	12	10	14	13	11	11	7	9	15	11	14	7	4	7	6	7	9	10	14
Miami	AP	RV	RV	RV			RV	RV	RV	RV							RV	25	RV		
Miami	C	RV	RV	RV	RV		RV	RV	RV	RV	RV	RV	RV	RV	RV	RV	RV	25	RV		
North Carolina	AP	6	5	4	3	7	7	8	9	14	11	9	9	12	8	10	8	5	6	5	
North Carolina	C	6	6	4	3	5	6	8	10	16	12	9	6	10	7	9	8	5	6	8	1
NC State	AP																				
NC State	C																				
Notre Dame	AP					23	21	25	24	23	20	15	14	20	RV	25	21	19	22	14	
Notre Dame	C					22	21	24	24	21	20	15	12	18	24	20	17	13	16	14	20
Pittsburgh	AP							RV													
Pittsburgh	C	RV	RV																		
Syracuse	AP	19	18	18	22	RV	RV	RV													
Syracuse	C	17	18	16	24	RV	RV	RV													
Virginia	AP	8	8	7	6	14	13	12	12	11	19	16	12	9	12	14	18	23	21	24	
Virginia	C	7	7	6	6	12	12	10	11	11	18	16	13	11	13	15	19	23	21	23	RV
Virginia Tech	AP	RV	RV	RV	RV	RV	RV	RV	RV	RV	21	RV		RV	RV		RV	RV		RV	
Virginia Tech	C	RV	RV	RV	RV	RV	RV	RV	RV	RV	23	RV						RV			
Wake Forest	AP																				
Wake Forest	C																				

=== Conference matrix ===
This table summarizes the head-to-head results between teams in conference play. Each team will play 18 conference games, and at least 1 against each opponent.

	Boston College	Clemson	Duke	Florida State	Georgia Tech	Louisville	Miami	North Carolina	NC State	Notre Dame	Pittsburgh	Syracuse	Virginia	Virginia Tech	Wake Forest
vs. Boston College	–	1–0	1–0	1–0	1–0	1–0	1–0	1–0	0–1	2–0	1-0	1-1	1–0	2-0	2-0
vs. Clemson	0–1	–	1–0	2–0	1–1	1–0	1–0	1–0	0–1	1–0	0–1	1–0	1-0	2–0	0–2
vs. Duke	0–1	0–1	-	1–1	0–1	1–0	1–1	1–1	1–0	0–1	0–1	1–0	0-1	1–0	0–2
vs. Florida State	0–1	0–2	1–1	–	1–0	0-1	0–2	1–0	0–1	1–1	1–0	1–0	0-1	0–1	0–1
vs. Georgia Tech	0–1	1–1	1–0	0–1	–	1–0	1–0	0–1	1–1	1–1	0–1	1–1	1-0	1–0	1–0
vs. Louisville	0–1	0–1	0–1	1–0	0–1	–	0–1	1–0	0–1	1–1	0–2	0–2	2-0	0–1	1–0
vs. Miami	0–1	0–1	1–1	2–0	0–1	1–0	–	0–1	0–2	1–0	0–1	1-0	0-1	1–1	1–0
vs. North Carolina	0–1	0–1	1–1	0–1	1–0	0–1	1–0	–	0–2	0–1	0–2	0–1	1-1	0–1	0–1
vs. NC State	1–0	1–0	0–1	1–0	1–1	1–0	2–0	2–0	–	1–0	0–1	1–0	1-0	0–1	2–0
vs. Notre Dame	0–2	0–1	1–0	1–1	1–1	1–1	0–1	1–0	0–1	–	0–1	0–1	1-0	0–1	0–1
vs. Pittsburgh	0–1	1–0	1–0	0–1	1–0	2–0	1–0	2–0	1–0	1–0	–	1–1	1-1	1–0	1–0
vs. Syracuse	1-1	0–1	0–1	0–1	1–1	2–0	0–1	1–0	0–1	1–0	1–1	–	0-1	1–0	0–1
vs. Virginia	0–1	0–1	1–0	1–0	0–1	0–2	1–0	1–1	0–1	0–1	1–1	1–0	-	1–1	0–1
vs. Virginia Tech	0–2	0–2	0–1	1–0	0–1	1–0	1–1	1–0	1–0	1–0	0–1	0–1	1-1	–	1–0
vs. Wake Forest	0–2	2–0	2–0	1–0	0–1	0–1	0–1	1–0	0–2	1–0	0–1	1–0	1-0	0–1	–
Total	2–16	6–12	11–7	12–6	8–10	12–6	10–8	14–4	4–14	12–6	4–14	10–8	11–7	10–8	9–9

== Postseason ==
=== ACC tournament ===
- March 7–11, 2017 Atlantic Coast Conference basketball tournament, Barclays Center, Brooklyn, New York.

First round Tuesday, March 7 ESPN2/ACCN
12	Clemson	75
13	NC State	61
10	Wake Forest	92
15	Boston College	78
11	Georgia Tech	59
14	Pittsburgh	61

Second round Wednesday, March 8 ESPN/ACCN
8	Syracuse	57
9	Miami	62
5	Duke	79
12	Clemson	72
7	Virginia Tech	99
10	Wake Forest	90
6	Virginia	75
14	Pittsburgh	63

Quarterfinals; Thursday, March 9 ESPN/ACCN
1	North Carolina	78
9	Miami	53
4	Louisville	77
5	Duke	81
2	Florida State	74
7	Virginia Tech	68
3	Notre Dame	71
6	Virginia	58

Semifinals; Friday, March 10; ESPN/ACCN
1	North Carolina	83
5	Duke	93
2	Florida State	73
3	Notre Dame	77

Championship; Saturday, March 11; ESPN/ACCN
5	Duke	75
3	Notre Dame	69

* Denotes Overtime Game

AP Rankings at time of tournament

=== NCAA tournament ===
Seed	Region	School	First Four	2nd round	3rd round	Sweet 16	Elite Eight	Final Four	Championship
1	South	North Carolina		W, 103-64 vs. #16 Texas Southern – (Greenville)	W, 77–65 vs. #8 Arkansas – (Greenville)	W, 92-80 vs. #4 Butler – (Memphis)	W, 75–73 vs. #2 Kentucky – (Memphis)	W, 77–76 vs. #3 Oregon – (Phoenix)	W, 71–65 vs. #1 Gonzaga – (Phoenix)
2	East	Duke		W, 87-65 vs. #15 Troy – (Buffalo)	L, 81–88 vs. #7 South Carolina – (Buffalo)				
2	Midwest	Louisville		W, 78-63 vs. #15 Jacksonville State – (Indianapolis)	L, 69–73 vs. #7 Michigan – (Indianapolis)				
3	West	Florida State		W, 86-80 vs. #14 Florida Gulf Coast – (Orlando)	L, 66–91 vs. #11 Xavier – (Orlando)				
5	East	Virginia		W, 76-71 vs. #12 UNC Wilmington – (Orlando)	L, 39–65 vs. #4 Florida – (Orlando)				
5	West	Notre Dame		W, 60-58 vs. #12 Princeton – (Buffalo)	L, 71–83 vs. #4 West Virginia – (Buffalo)				
8	Midwest	Miami		L, 58-78 vs. #9 Michigan State – (Tulsa)					
9	East	Virginia Tech		L, 74-84 vs. #8 Wisconsin – (Buffalo)					
11	South	Wake Forest	L, 88-95 vs. #11 Kansas State – (Dayton)						

=== National Invitation Tournament ===
Seed	Bracket	School	1st round	2nd round	Quarterfinals	Semifinals	Championship
1	Syracuse	Syracuse	W, 90-77 vs. #8 UNC Greensboro – (Syracuse)	L, 80–85 vs. #5 Ole Miss – (Syracuse)			
2	Iowa	Clemson	L, 69-74 vs. #7 Oakland – (Clemson)				
6	Syracuse	Georgia Tech	W, 75-63 vs. #3 Indiana – (Atlanta)	W, 71–57 vs. #7 Belmont – (Atlanta)	W, 74–66 vs. #5 Ole Miss – (Oxford)	W, 76–61 vs. #8 Cal State Bakersfield – (New York City)	L, 56–88 vs. #4 TCU – (New York City)

== Honors and awards ==
=== All-Americans ===
Consensus All-Americans
First Team	Second Team
Justin Jackson – North Carolina	Luke Kennard – Duke

To earn "consensus" status, a player must win honors from a majority of the following teams: the Associated Press, the USBWA, The Sporting News and the National Association of Basketball Coaches.

Associated Press	NABC	Sporting News	USBWA
First Team
Justin Jackson – North Carolina	Justin Jackson – North Carolina	Justin Jackson – North Carolina	
Second Team
Luke Kennard – Duke	Luke Kennard – Duke	Luke Kennard – Duke	Justin Jackson – North Carolina; Luke Kennard –Duke
Third Team
Bonzie Colson – Notre Dame		Bonzie Colson – Notre Dame	
Honorable Mention
Donovan Mitchell – Louisville; Dennis Smith Jr. – NC State			

==== ACC honors and awards ====
2017 ACC Men's Basketball Individual Awards
Award	Recipient(s)
Player of the Year	Justin Jackson, F., NORTH CAROLINA
Coach of the Year	Josh Pastner GEORGIA TECH
Defensive Player of the Year	Ben Lammers, C., GEORGIA TECH
Freshman of the Year	Dennis Smith Jr., G., N.C. STATE
Most Improved Player of the Year	John Collins, C., WAKE FOREST
Sixth Man Award	Seth Allen, G., VIRGINIA TECH

2017 ACC Men's Basketball All-Conference Teams
First Team	Second Team	Third Team
†Luke Kennard, So., G., DUKE; Justin Jackson, Jr., F., NORTH CAROLINA; John Collins, So., C., WAKE FOREST; Bonzie Colson, Jr., F., NOTRE DAME; Donovan Mitchell, So., G., LOUISVILLE	Dwayne Bacon, So., G., FLORIDA STATE; Dennis Smith Jr., Fr., G., N.C. STATE; Ben Lammers, Jr., C., GEORGIA TECH; Joel Berry II, Jr., G., NORTH CAROLINA; London Perrantes, Sr., G., VIRGINIA	Michael Young, Sr., F., PITTSBURGH; Jaron Blossomgame, Sr., F., CLEMSON; Andrew White, GS., F., SYRACUSE; Davon Reed, Sr., F., MIAMI; Jayson Tatum, Fr., F., DUKE
† - denotes unanimous selection

== NBA draft ==
The ACC had 14 players drafted in the 2017 NBA draft. 10 players were drafted in the first round, and 4 players were drafted in the second round.

PG	Point guard	SG	Shooting guard	SF	Small forward	PF	Power forward	C	Center

Player	Team	Round	Pick #	Position	School
Jayson Tatum	Boston Celtics	1st	3	SF	Duke
Jonathan Isaac	Orlando Magic	1st	6	SF/PF	Florida State
Dennis Smith Jr.	Dallas Mavericks	1st	9	PG	NC State
Luke Kennard	Detroit Pistons	1st	12	SG	Duke
Donovan Mitchell	Denver Nuggets	1st	13	SG	Louisville
Justin Jackson	Portland Trail Blazers	1st	15	SF	North Carolina
John Collins	Atlanta Hawks	1st	19	PF	Wake Forest
Harry Giles	Portland Trail Blazers	1st	20	PF/C	Duke
Tyler Lydon	Utah Jazz	1st	24	PF	Syracuse
Tony Bradley	Los Angeles Lakers	1st	28	PF/C	North Carolina
Frank Jackson	Charlotte Hornets	2nd	31	PG	Duke
Davon Reed	Phoenix Suns	2nd	32	SG	Miami
Dwayne Bacon	New Orleans Pelicans	2nd	40	SG	Florida State
Jaron Blossomgame	San Antonio Spurs	2nd	59	SF	Clemson
