= 2016–17 Virginia Cavaliers men's basketball team =

American college basketball season

2016–17 Virginia Cavaliers men's basketball

Emerald Coast Classic champions

NCAA tournament, Second Round
- Conference: Atlantic Coast Conference

Ranking
- AP: No. 24
- Record: 23–11 (11–7 ACC)
- Head coach: Tony Bennett (8th season)
- Associate head coach: Ron Sanchez (8th season)
- Assistant coaches: Jason Williford (8th season); Brad Soderberg (2nd season)
- Offensive scheme: Blocker-Mover
- Base defense: Pack line
- Home arena: John Paul Jones Arena

2016–17 ACC men's basketball standings
	Conf.				Overall
Team	W		L	PCT	W		L	PCT
No. 5 North Carolina	14	–	4	.778	33	–	7	.825
No. 16 Florida State	12	–	6	.667	26	–	9	.743
No. 14 Notre Dame	12	–	6	.667	26	–	10	.722
No. 10 Louisville	12	–	6	.667	25	–	9	.735
No. 7 Duke †	11	–	7	.611	28	–	9	.757
No. 24 Virginia	11	–	7	.611	23	–	11	.676
Virginia Tech	10	–	8	.556	22	–	11	.667
Miami (FL)	10	–	8	.556	21	–	12	.636
Syracuse	10	–	8	.556	19	–	15	.559
Wake Forest	9	–	9	.500	19	–	14	.576
Georgia Tech	8	–	10	.444	21	–	16	.568
Clemson	6	–	12	.333	17	–	16	.515
NC State	0	–	14	.000	0	–	17	.000[3]
Pittsburgh	4	–	14	.222	16	–	17	.485
Boston College	2	–	16	.111	9	–	23	.281
† 2017 ACC tournament winner Rankings from AP poll

The 2016–17 Virginia Cavaliers men's basketball team represented the University of Virginia during the 2016–17 NCAA Division I men's basketball season, in their 112th season of play. The team was led by head coach Tony Bennett, in his eighth year, and played their home games at John Paul Jones Arena as members of the Atlantic Coast Conference. They finished the season 23–11, 11–7 in ACC play to finish in ACC play in a tie for fifth place. They defeated Pittsburgh in the second round of the ACC tournament to advance to the quarterfinals, where they lost to Notre Dame. They received an at-large bid to the NCAA tournament as the No. 5 seed in the East region. There, they defeated UNC Wilmington in the first round before losing in the second round to Florida.

== Previous season ==
Coming off of two highly successful regular seasons in 2014 and 2015, but with early exits from the NCAA tournament each time, and with the final season for seniors Malcolm Brogdon and Anthony Gill, expectations were high for the program in 2015–16. However, the regular season was mixed: despite wins against programs like West Virginia, Villanova, California, and North Carolina, the team also suffered upsets from Virginia Tech, Georgia Tech, and Florida State. Despite this, the Cavaliers finished the season 29–8 overall and 13–5 in conference play, finishing at second place in the ACC. They fell in the ACC tournament championship to North Carolina. However, they received an at-large bid to the NCAA tournament, and received their second No. 1 seed in three years. In the tournament, they defeated Hampton, Butler, and Iowa State, to advance to their first Elite Eight in twenty-one years. There, they lost to Syracuse, despite leading by 14 until halftime.

== Off-season ==
=== Departures ===
Name	Number	Pos.	Height	Weight	Year	Hometown	Reason for departure
Malcolm Brogdon	15	G	6'5"	215	RS senior	Atlanta, Georgia	Graduated/Milwaukee Bucks
Anthony Gill	13	F	6'8"	228	RS senior	High Point, North Carolina	Graduated/MHP Riesen Ludwigsburg
Jeff Jones	24	F	6'6"	213	Senior	Charlottesville, Virginia	Academically ineligible
Caid Kirven	24	F	6'8"	228	Senior	Raleigh, North Carolina	Graduated
Austin Nichols	1	F	6'9"	232	RS junior	Collierville, Tennessee	Dismissed from team
Evan Nolte	11	F	6'9"	228	Senior	Milton, Georgia	Graduated
Mike Tobey	10	C	7'0"	255	Senior	Monroe, New York	Graduated/Charlotte Hornets

=== 2016 recruiting class ===
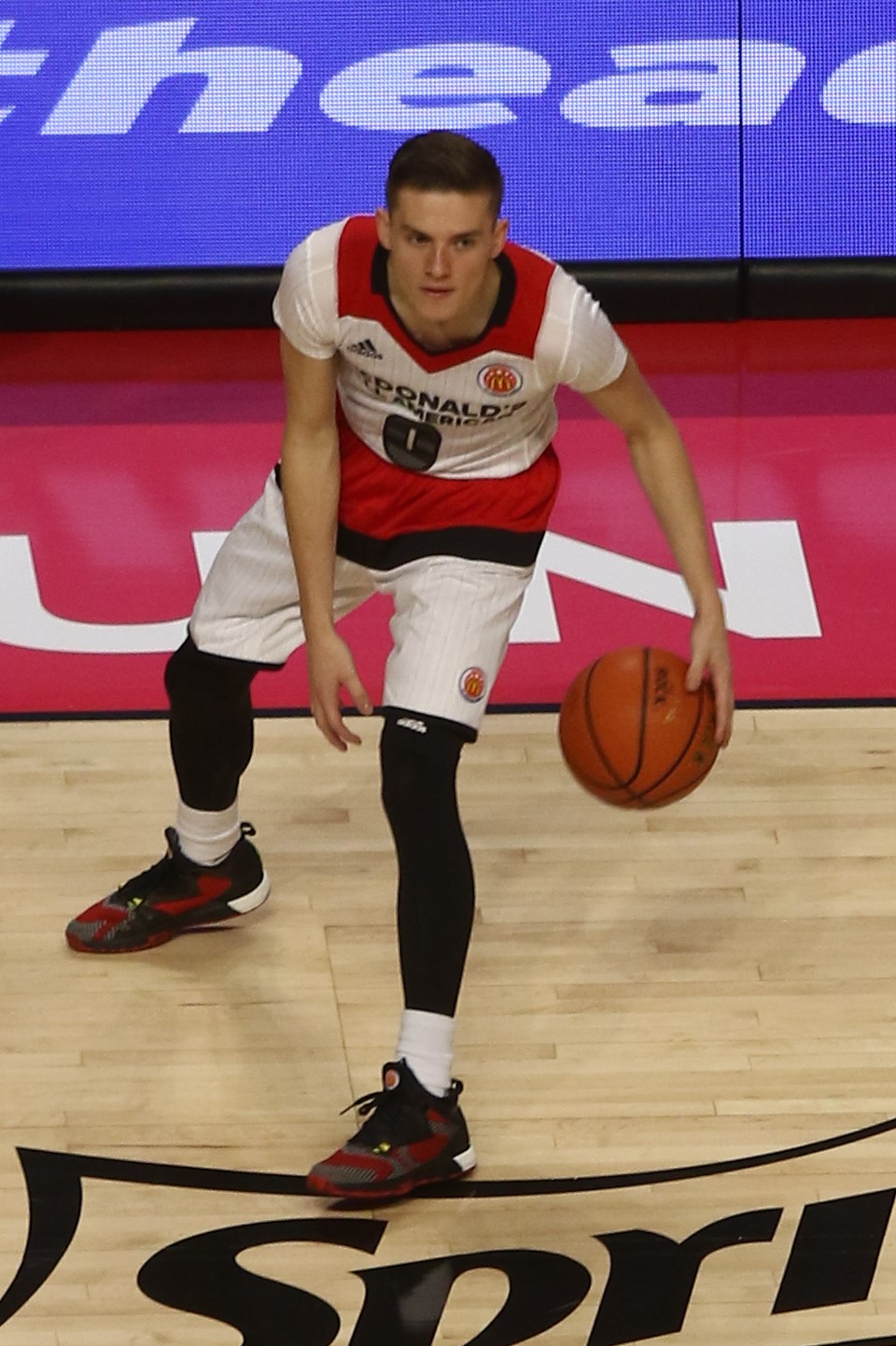
Kyle Guy at the 2016 McDonald's All-American Game

College recruiting
Name	Hometown	School	Height	Weight	Commit date
Ty Jerome; PG	New Rochelle, NY	Iona Preparatory School	6 ft 5 in (1.96 m)	190 lb (86 kg)	September 2, 2014
Ty Jerome; PG	Recruit ratings: Scout: Rivals: 247Sports: ESPN: (87)				
Kyle Guy; PG/SG	Indianapolis, IN	Lawrence Central HS	6 ft 3 in (1.91 m)	165 lb (75 kg)	October 20, 2014
Kyle Guy; PG/SG	Recruit ratings: Scout: Rivals: 247Sports: ESPN: (92)				
Jay Huff; PF	Durham, NC	Voyager Academy	6 ft 11 in (2.11 m)	190 lb (86 kg)	May 21, 2015
Jay Huff; PF	Recruit ratings: Scout: Rivals: 247Sports: ESPN: (83)				
De'Andre Hunter; SF	Philadelphia, PA	Friends' Central School	6 ft 7 in (2.01 m)	195 lb (88 kg)	September 12, 2015
De'Andre Hunter; SF	Recruit ratings: Scout: Rivals: 247Sports: ESPN: (83)				
Overall recruit ranking: Scout: 13 247Sports: 8 ESPN: 8
Note: In many cases, Scout, Rivals, 247Sports, On3, and ESPN may conflict in their listings of height and weight.; In these cases, the average was taken. ESPN grades are on a 100-point scale.; Sources: "Virginia 2016 Basketball Commitments". Rivals.; "2016 Virginia Commits". Scout.; "2016 Player Commits". ESPN.; "Scout.com Team Recruiting Rankings". Scout.; "2016 Team Ranking". Rivals.; "Virginia 2016 Basketball Commitments". 247Sports.

== Roster ==
2016–17 Virginia Cavaliers men's basketball team
Players
Coaches

Pos.	#	Name	Height	Weight	Year	Previous school	Hometown
G	0	Devon Hall	6 ft 5 in (1.96 m)	207 lb (94 kg)	RS Jr	Cape Henry Collegiate School	Virginia Beach, Virginia
G	2	Justice Bartley (W)	6 ft 5 in (1.96 m)	212 lb (96 kg)	So	Montrose Christian School	Lilburn, Georgia
G	4	Marial Shayok	6 ft 5 in (1.96 m)	196 lb (89 kg)	Jr	Blair Academy	Ottawa, Ontario
G	5	Kyle Guy	6 ft 3 in (1.91 m)	165 lb (75 kg)	Fr	Lawrence Central HS	Indianapolis, Indiana
G	10	Trevon Gross Jr. (W)	6 ft 3 in (1.91 m)	206 lb (93 kg)	So	St. Benedict's Prep School	Jackson, New Jersey
G	11	Ty Jerome	6 ft 5 in (1.96 m)	192 lb (87 kg)	Fr	Iona Preparatory School	New Rochelle, New York
F	12	De'Andre Hunter (redshirt)	6 ft 7 in (2.01 m)	212 lb (96 kg)	Fr	Friends' Central School	Philadelphia, Pennsylvania
F	21	Isaiah Wilkins	6 ft 7 in (2.01 m)	225 lb (102 kg)	Jr	Greater Atlanta Christian	Atlanta, Georgia
F	24	Jeff Jones (W)	6 ft 6 in (1.98 m)	213 lb (97 kg)	Sr	St. Anne's-Belfield School	Charlottesville, Virginia
F	25	Mamadi Diakite	6 ft 9 in (2.06 m)	214 lb (97 kg)	RS Fr	Blue Ridge School	Conakry, Guinea
F	30	Jay Huff (redshirt)	6 ft 11 in (2.11 m)	215 lb (98 kg)	Fr	Voyager Academy	Durham, North Carolina
F	31	Jarred Reuter	6 ft 7 in (2.01 m)	243 lb (110 kg)	So	Brewster Academy	Marion, Massachusetts
G	32	London Perrantes	6 ft 2 in (1.88 m)	197 lb (89 kg)	Sr	Crespi Carmelite HS	Los Angeles, California
C	33	Jack Salt	6 ft 11 in (2.11 m)	247 lb (112 kg)	RS So	Westlake Boys HS	Auckland, New Zealand
G	51	Darius Thompson	6 ft 4 in (1.93 m)	196 lb (89 kg)	RS Jr	Blackman HS/Tennessee	Murfreesboro, Tennessee

Head coach

- Tony Bennett (Green Bay)

Assistant coach(es)

- Ron Sanchez (SUNY-Oneonta)
- Brad Soderberg (UW–Stevens Point)
- Jason Williford (Virginia)

Strength and conditioning coach(es)

- Mike Curtis (Virginia)

Athletic trainer(s)

- Ethan Saliba (Kansas)

Legend

- (C) Team captain
- (S) Suspended
- (I) Ineligible
- (W) Walk-on
- Injured
- Current redshirt

Roster
Last update: March 14, 2017

=== Depth chart ===
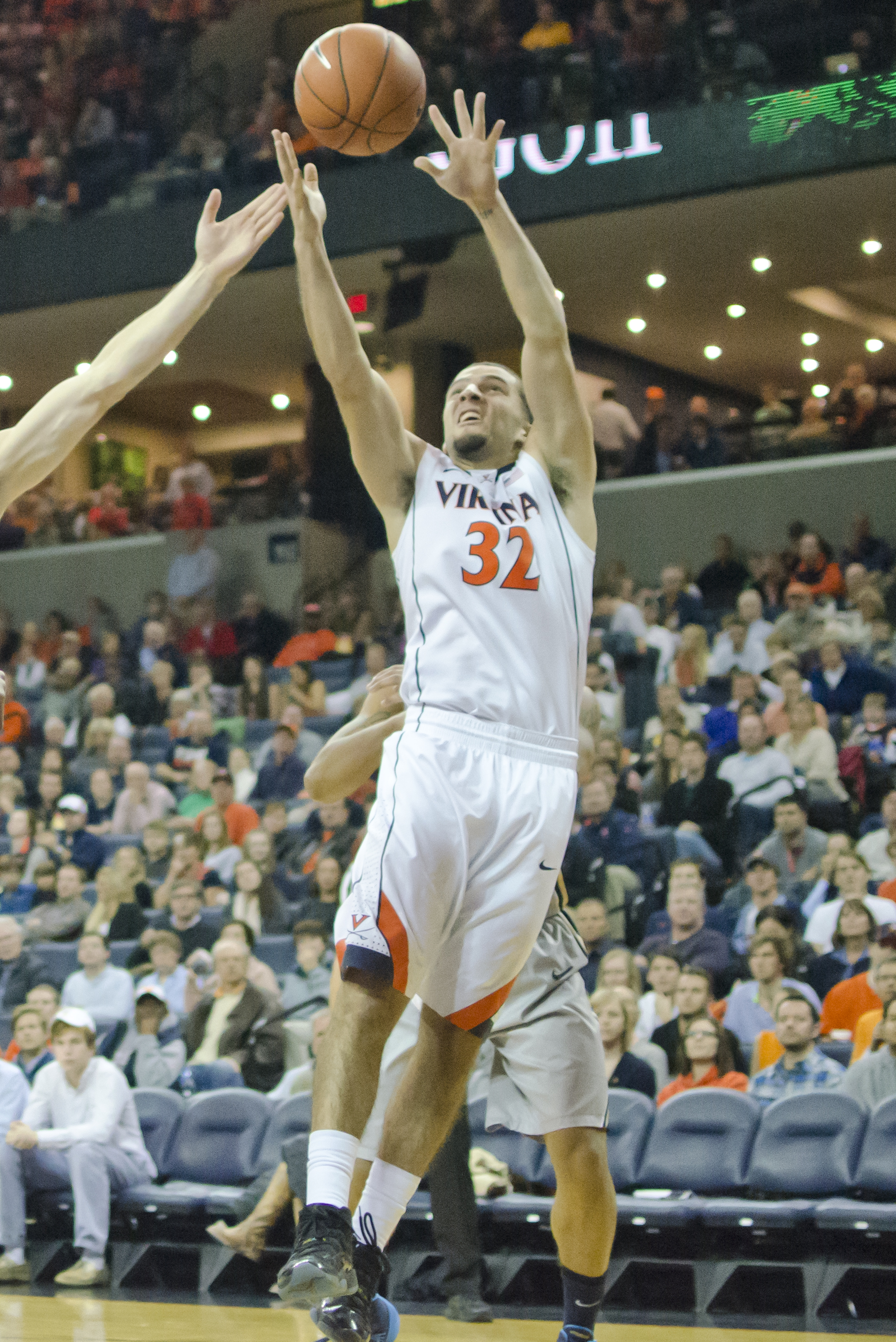
London Perrantes

Pos.	Starting 5	Bench 1	Bench 2
C	Jack Salt	Mamadi Diakite
PF	Isaiah Wilkins	Jarred Reuter
SF	Marial Shayok	Darius Thompson	Jeff Jones
SG	Devon Hall	Kyle Guy	Justice Bartley
PG	London Perrantes	Ty Jerome	Trevon Gross Jr.

== Schedule and results ==
Date time, TV	Rank^{#}	Opponent^{#}	Result	Record	High points	High rebounds	High assists	Site (attendance) city, state
Spain exhibition games
Aug 10, 2016*		at Madrid Generals	W 91–82		17 – Tied	–	–	Pabellón Felipe Reyes; Getafe, Spain
Aug 11, 2016*		at Madrid Generals	W 78–76		14 – Tied	–	–	Pabellón Felipe Reyes; Getafe, Spain
Aug 13, 2016*		at Albacete Basket	W 70–44		14 – Huff	8 – Salt	–	Pabellón del Parque; Albacete, Spain
Aug 16, 2016*		at Sant Julià All-Stars	W 72–62		14 – Perrantes	–	–	Pavelló Esportiu Municipal; Sant Julià de Vilatorta, Spain
Aug 17, 2016*		at Sant Julià All-Stars	W 85–49		14 – Nichols	–	–	Pavelló Esportiu Municipal; Sant Julià de Vilatorta, Spain
Regular season
Nov 11, 2016*; 7:00 pm, ESPN3	No. 8	at UNC Greensboro	W 76–51	1–0	15 – Shayok	9 – Wilkins	3 – 3 Tied	Greensboro Coliseum (5,513); Greensboro, North Carolina
Nov 15, 2016*; 7:00 pm, ACCN Extra	No. 8	St. Francis Brooklyn; Emerald Coast Classic	W 72–32	2–0	11 – Nichols	6 – Thompson	3 – Tied	John Paul Jones Arena (14,471); Charlottesville, Virginia
Nov 20, 2016*; 1:00 pm, ACCN Extra	No. 8	Yale	W 62–38	3–0	15 – Shayok	9 – Wilkins	7 – Perrantes	John Paul Jones Arena (14,242); Charlottesville, Virginia
Nov 22, 2016*; 7:00 pm, ACCN Extra	No. 7	Grambling State; Emerald Coast Classic	W 90–34	4–0	20 – Guy	7 – Reuter	5 – Jerome	John Paul Jones Arena (13,235); Charlottesville, Virginia
Nov 25, 2016*; 7:00 pm, CBSSN	No. 7	vs. Iowa; Emerald Coast Classic semifinals	W 74–41	5–0	14 – Reuter	9 – Reuter	4 – Tied	The Arena at NWFSC (2,196); Niceville, Florida
Nov 26, 2016*; 7:00 pm, CBSSN	No. 7	vs. Providence; Emerald Coast Classic championship	W 63–52	6–0	11 – Tied	7 – Perrantes	6 – Perrantes	The Arena at NWFSC (2,196); Niceville, Florida
Nov 30, 2016*; 9:00 pm, ESPN2	No. 6	Ohio State; ACC–Big Ten Challenge	W 63–61	7–0	19 – Perrantes	6 – Salt	3 – Tied	John Paul Jones Arena (14,566); Charlottesville, Virginia
Dec 3, 2016*; 2:00 pm, ESPNU	No. 6	No. 25 West Virginia	L 57–66	7–1	14 – Thompson	8 – Wilkins	7 – Perrantes	John Paul Jones Arena (14,623); Charlottesville, Virginia
Dec 6, 2016*; 7:00 pm, ACCN Extra	No. 14	East Carolina	W 76–53	8–1	13 – Guy	5 – Tied	6 – Thompson	John Paul Jones Arena (13,813); Charlottesville, Virginia
Dec 17, 2016*; 4:30 pm, ESPNU	No. 13	Robert Morris	W 79–39	9–1	13 – Tied	6 – Wilkins	6 – Tied	John Paul Jones Arena (13,452); Charlottesville, Virginia
Dec 21, 2016*; 10:00 pm, ESPN2	No. 12	at California	W 56–52	10–1	17 – Guy	6 – Hall	5 – Thompson	Haas Pavilion (11,877); Berkeley, California
Dec 28, 2016; 7:00 pm, ESPN2	No. 12	at No. 6 Louisville	W 61–53	11–1 (1–0)	10 – Hall	7 – Salt	7 – Perrantes	KFC Yum! Center (22,090); Louisville, Kentucky
Dec 31, 2016; 2:00 pm, ESPNU	No. 12	No. 20 Florida State	L 58–60	11–2 (1–1)	14 – Guy	7 – Salt	4 – Perrantes	John Paul Jones Arena (14,623); Charlottesville, Virginia
Jan 4, 2017; 9:00 pm, RSN	No. 11	at Pittsburgh	L 76–88 ^{OT}	11–3 (1–2)	16 – Perrantes	9 – Hall	3 – Tied	Petersen Events Center (9,814); Pittsburgh, Pennsylvania
Jan 8, 2017; 8:00 pm, ESPNU	No. 11	Wake Forest	W 79–62	12–3 (2–2)	24 – Perrantes	8 – Hall	2 – Tied	John Paul Jones Arena (13,717); Charlottesville, Virginia
Jan 14, 2017; Noon, ACCN	No. 19	at Clemson	W 77–73	13–3 (3–2)	25 – Perrantes	13 – Wilkins	2 – Tied	Littlejohn Coliseum (9,000); Clemson, South Carolina
Jan 18, 2017; 8:00 pm, ACCN	No. 16	at Boston College	W 71–54	14–3 (4–2)	13 – Hall	9 – Wilkins	6 – Hall	Conte Forum (5,038); Chestnut Hill, Massachusetts
Jan 21, 2017; 2:00 pm, ACCN	No. 16	Georgia Tech	W 62–49	15–3 (5–2)	19 – Shayok	6 – Tied	4 – Tied	John Paul Jones Arena (14,459); Charlottesville, Virginia
Jan 24, 2017; 8:00 pm, ACCN	No. 12	at No. 14 Notre Dame	W 71–54	16–3 (6–2)	22 – Perrantes	9 – Tied	5 – Thompson	Edmund P. Joyce Center (9,149); Notre Dame, Indiana
Jan 29, 2017*; 1:00 pm, FOX	No. 12	at No. 1 Villanova	L 59–61	16–4	15 – Jerome	8 – Wilkins	6 – Perrantes	Wells Fargo Center (20,907); Philadelphia, Pennsylvania
Feb 1, 2017; 8:00 pm, ACCN	No. 9	Virginia Tech; Commonwealth Clash	W 71–48	17–4 (7–2)	17 – Hall	9 – Tied	4 – Hall	John Paul Jones Arena (14,623); Charlottesville, Virginia
Feb 4, 2017; Noon, ESPN2	No. 9	at Syracuse	L 62–66	17–5 (7–3)	14 – Guy	6 – Hall	8 – Perrantes	Carrier Dome (27,553); Syracuse, New York
Feb 6, 2017; 7:00 pm, ESPN	No. 12	No. 4 Louisville	W 71–55	18–5 (8–3)	18 – Perrantes	11 – Wilkins	4 – Thompson	John Paul Jones Arena (14,623); Charlottesville, Virginia
Feb 12, 2017; 6:30 pm, ESPNU	No. 12	at Virginia Tech; Commonwealth Clash	L 78–80 ^{2OT}	18–6 (8–4)	22 – Perrantes	9 – Wilkins	3 – Perrantes	Cassell Coliseum (9,567); Blacksburg, Virginia
Feb 15, 2017; 9:00 pm, ESPN2	No. 14	No. 12 Duke	L 55–65	18–7 (8–5)	14 – Perrantes	9 – Wilkins	2 – Perrantes	John Paul Jones Arena (14,623); Charlottesville, Virginia
Feb 18, 2017; 8:15 pm, ESPN	No. 14	at No. 10 North Carolina; ESPN College GameDay	L 41–65	18–8 (8–6)	13 – Shayok	6 – Hall	2 – Tied	Dean Smith Center (21,750); Chapel Hill, North Carolina
Feb 20, 2017; 7:00 pm, ESPN	No. 18	Miami (FL)	L 48–54 ^{OT}	18–9 (8–7)	15 – Hall	10 – Wilkins	4 – Thompson	John Paul Jones Arena (14,623); Charlottesville, Virginia
Feb 25, 2017; Noon, ESPN	No. 18	at NC State	W 70–55	19–9 (9–7)	19 – Guy	9 – Hall	10 – Perrantes	PNC Arena (16,718); Raleigh, North Carolina
Feb 27, 2017; 7:00 pm, ESPN	No. 23	No. 5 North Carolina	W 53−43	20−9 (10−7)	17 – Guy	9 – Wilkins	5 – Hall	John Paul Jones Arena (14,623); Charlottesville, Virginia
Mar 4, 2017; Noon, ACCN	No. 23	Pittsburgh	W 67−42	21−9 (11−7)	22 – Perrantes	9 – Salt	3 – Perrantes	John Paul Jones Arena (14,228); Charlottesville, Virginia
ACC Tournament
Mar 8, 2017; 9:00 pm, ESPN2/ACCN	(6) No. 21	vs. (14) Pittsburgh; Second Round	W 75–63	22–9	20 – Guy	8 – Wilkins	4 – Jerome	Barclays Center (17,732); Brooklyn, New York
Mar 9, 2017; 9:00 pm, ESPN/ACCN	(6) No. 21	vs. (3) No. 22 Notre Dame; Quarterfinals	L 58–71	22–10	12 – Tied	9 – Hall	6 – Jerome	Barclays Center (17,732); Brooklyn, New York
NCAA tournament
Mar 16, 2017*; 12:40 pm, truTV	(5 E) No. 24	vs. (12 E) UNC Wilmington; First Round	W 76–71	23–10	24 – Perrantes	7 – Hall	3 – Tied	Amway Center (15,037); Orlando, Florida
Mar 18, 2017*; 8:40 pm, TNT	(5 E) No. 24	vs. (4 E) No. 20 Florida; Second Round	L 39–65	23–11	9 – Diakite	10 – Salt	3 – Tied	Amway Center (17,308); Orlando, Florida
*Non-conference game. ^{#}Rankings from AP Poll. (#) Tournament seedings in parentheses. E=East Region. All times are in Eastern Time..

== Rankings ==
Ranking movements Legend: ██ Increase in ranking ██ Decrease in ranking RV = Received votes
	Week																			
Poll	Pre	1	2	3	4	5	6	7	8	9	10	11	12	13	14	15	16	17	18	Final
AP	8	8	7	6	14	13	12	12	11	19	16	12	9	12	14	18	23	21	24	Not released
Coaches	7	7	6	6	12	12	10	11	11	18	16	13	11	13	15	19	23	21	23	RV

*AP does not release post-NCAA tournament rankings.
