= 2016–17 Florida State Seminoles men's basketball team =

American college basketball season

2016–17 Florida State Seminoles men's basketball

NCAA tournament, Second Round
- Conference: Atlantic Coast Conference

Ranking
- Coaches: No. 24
- AP: No. 16
- Record: 26–9 (12–6 ACC)
- Head coach: Leonard Hamilton (15th season)
- Assistant coaches: Stan Jones (15th year); Dennis Gates (6th year); Charlton Young (4th year)
- Home arena: Donald L. Tucker Center (Capacity: 12,100)

2016–17 ACC men's basketball standings
| | Conf. | | | | Overall |
| Team | W | | L | PCT | W | | L | PCT |
|---|---|---|---|---|---|---|---|---|
| No. 5 North Carolina | 14 | – | 4 | .778 | 33 | – | 7 | .825 |
| No. 16 Florida State | 12 | – | 6 | .667 | 26 | – | 9 | .743 |
| No. 14 Notre Dame | 12 | – | 6 | .667 | 26 | – | 10 | .722 |
| No. 10 Louisville | 12 | – | 6 | .667 | 25 | – | 9 | .735 |
| No. 7 Duke † | 11 | – | 7 | .611 | 28 | – | 9 | .757 |
| No. 24 Virginia | 11 | – | 7 | .611 | 23 | – | 11 | .676 |
| Virginia Tech | 10 | – | 8 | .556 | 22 | – | 11 | .667 |
| Miami (FL) | 10 | – | 8 | .556 | 21 | – | 12 | .636 |
| Syracuse | 10 | – | 8 | .556 | 19 | – | 15 | .559 |
| Wake Forest | 9 | – | 9 | .500 | 19 | – | 14 | .576 |
| Georgia Tech | 8 | – | 10 | .444 | 21 | – | 16 | .568 |
| Clemson | 6 | – | 12 | .333 | 17 | – | 16 | .515 |
| NC State | 0 | – | 14 | .000 | 0 | – | 17 | .000[3] |
| Pittsburgh | 4 | – | 14 | .222 | 16 | – | 17 | .485 |
| Boston College | 2 | – | 16 | .111 | 9 | – | 23 | .281 |
† 2017 ACC tournament winner Rankings from AP poll

The 2016–17 Florida State Seminoles men's basketball team, variously Florida State or FSU, represented Florida State University during the 2016–17 NCAA Division I men's basketball season. The Seminoles were led by head coach Leonard Hamilton, in his fifteenth year, and played their home games at the Donald L. Tucker Center on the university's Tallahassee, Florida campus as members of the Atlantic Coast Conference.

The Seminoles achieved their best start in school history, winning 15 of their first 16 games and six of their first seven conference games, including a stretch that included six straight ranked opponents. Over the course of the season, Dwayne Bacon became the 46th Seminole player, and only the second sophomore, to score a thousand career points. They set their record for most regular season wins, tied their record for most ACC wins in a single season and went undefeated at home for the first time since the 1975–76 season. Jonathan Isaac and Dwayne Bacon went on to be selected in the NBA draft.

Florida State finished in a three-way tie for second in the ACC and reached the semifinals of the ACC tournament. The Seminoles received an at-large bid to the NCAA tournament as a three-seed in the west region, their first tournament appearance since 2012, where they reached the second round.

== Previous season ==
The Seminoles finished the 2015–16 season 20–14, 8–10 in ACC play, to finish in a tie for eleventh place. They defeated Boston College in the first round of the ACC tournament before losing to Virginia Tech. The Seminoles received an invitation to the National Invitation Tournament where they defeated Davidson before losing to eventual NIT champ, Valparaiso.

Guard Malik Beasley was taken in the first round of the NBA draft by the Denver Nuggets.

== Preseason ==
Prior to the start of the season, Florida State was picked to finish eighth in the ACC while Dwayne Bacon was named to the preseason All-ACC team.

== Departures ==
| Name | Number | Pos. | Height | Weight | Year | Hometown | Notes |
|---|---|---|---|---|---|---|---|
| Devon Bookert | 1 | G | 6'3" | 198 | Senior | Anchorage, AK | Graduated |
| Benji Bell | 3 | G | 6'4" | 204 | Junior | Gainesville, FL | Transferred to Shaw |
| Malik Beasley | 5 | G | 6'5" | 196 | Freshman | Alpharetta, GA | Declared for NBA draft |
| Boris Bojanovsky | 15 | C | 7'3" | 248 | Senior | Bratislava, Slovakia | Graduated |
| Robbie Berwick | 24 | G | 6'4" | 188 | Sophomore | Atascadero, CA | Transferred to Colorado State |
| Michael Saxton | 31 | G | 6'5" | 213 | Senior | Orlando, FL | Graduated |
| Montay Brandon | 32 | G | 6'8" | 229 | Senior | Greensboro, NC | Graduated |

== Recruits ==
College recruiting information
| Name | Hometown | School | Height | Weight | Commit date |
|---|---|---|---|---|---|
| Jonathan Isaac #4 SF | Naples, FL | IMG Academy | 6 ft 9 in (2.06 m) | 190 lb (86 kg) | Jul 6, 2015 |
| Jonathan Isaac #4 SF | Recruit ratings: Scout: Rivals: 247Sports: ESPN: | | | | |
| Trent Forrest #9 SG | Chipley, FL | Chipley High School | 6 ft 4 in (1.93 m) | 185 lb (84 kg) | May 5, 2015 |
| Trent Forrest #9 SG | Recruit ratings: Scout: Rivals: 247Sports: ESPN: | | | | |
| CJ Walker #20 PG | Indianapolis, IN | Arsenal Technical High School | 6 ft 0 in (1.83 m) | 170 lb (77 kg) | Jun 20, 2015 |
| CJ Walker #20 PG | Recruit ratings: Scout: Rivals: 247Sports: ESPN: | | | | |
| Mfiondu Kabengele #47 SF | Burlington, ON | Don Bosco Prep | 6 ft 9 in (2.06 m) | 235 lb (107 kg) | Mar 2, 2016 |
| Mfiondu Kabengele #47 SF | Recruit ratings: Scout: Rivals: 247Sports: ESPN: | | | | |
Overall recruit ranking: Scout: N/A Rivals: 10 ESPN: N/A
Note: In many cases, Scout, Rivals, 247Sports, On3, and ESPN may conflict in their listings of height and weight.; In these cases, the average was taken. ESPN grades are on a 100-point scale.; Sources: "2016 Team Ranking". Rivals.

| Name | Number | Pos. | Height | Weight | Year | Hometown | Previous School |
|---|---|---|---|---|---|---|---|
| Patrick Savoy Jr. | 5 | G | 6'4" | 200 | Sophomore | Las Vegas, NV | Junior college transfer from Sheridan College |
| Braian Angola | 11 | G | 6'6" | 185 | Junior | Villanueva, Colombia | Junior college transfer from College of Southern Idaho |

2017 Recruiting class

College recruiting information (2017)
| Name | Hometown | School | Height | Weight | Commit date |
|---|---|---|---|---|---|
| M. J. Walker; SG | Jonesboro, GA | Jonesboro High School | 6 ft 5 in (1.96 m) | 207 lb (94 kg) | May 24, 2017 |
| M. J. Walker; SG | Recruit ratings: Scout: Rivals: 247Sports: ESPN: | | | | |
| RaiQuan Gray; PF | Fort Lauderdale, FL | Dillard High School | 6 ft 8 in (2.03 m) | 240 lb (110 kg) | Aug 8, 2016 |
| RaiQuan Gray; PF | Recruit ratings: Scout: Rivals: 247Sports: ESPN: | | | | |
| Anthony Polite; SG | Boca Raton, FL | St. Andrews School | 6 ft 6 in (1.98 m) | 210 lb (95 kg) | Aug 30, 2016 |
| Anthony Polite; SG | Recruit ratings: Scout: Rivals: 247Sports: ESPN: | | | | |
| Wyatt Wilkes; PF | Winter Park, FL | Winter Park High School | 6 ft 7 in (2.01 m) | 200 lb (91 kg) | Aug 31, 2016 |
| Wyatt Wilkes; PF | Recruit ratings: Scout: Rivals: 247Sports: ESPN: | | | | |
| Ikechukwu Obiagu; C | Atlanta, GA | Greenforest Christian Academy | 7 ft 0 in (2.13 m) | 230 lb (100 kg) | Nov 28, 2016 |
| Ikechukwu Obiagu; C | Recruit ratings: Scout: Rivals: 247Sports: ESPN: | | | | |
Overall recruit ranking: Scout: N/A Rivals: N/A ESPN: N/A
Note: In many cases, Scout, Rivals, 247Sports, On3, and ESPN may conflict in their listings of height and weight.; In these cases, the average was taken. ESPN grades are on a 100-point scale.; Sources: "2017 Team Ranking". Rivals.

== Roster ==
2016–17 Florida State Seminoles men's basketball team
Players
Coaches
}

| Pos. | # | Name | Height | Weight | Year | Previous school | Hometown |
|---|---|---|---|---|---|---|---|
| F | 0 | Phil Cofer | 6 ft 8 in (2.03 m) | 218 lb (99 kg) | Jr | Whitewater | Atlanta, GA |
| F | 1 | Jonathan Isaac | 6 ft 10 in (2.08 m) | 210 lb (95 kg) | Fr | IMG Academy | Naples, FL |
| G | 2 | CJ Walker | 6 ft 1 in (1.85 m) | 195 lb (88 kg) | Fr | Arsenal Technical | Indianapolis, IN |
| G | 3 | Trent Forrest | 6 ft 6 in (1.98 m) | 215 lb (98 kg) | Fr | Chipley | Chipley, FL |
| G | 4 | Dwayne Bacon | 6 ft 7 in (2.01 m) | 221 lb (100 kg) | So | Oak Hill Academy | Lakeland, FL |
| G | 5 | P. J. Savoy | 6 ft 4 in (1.93 m) | 200 lb (91 kg) | So | Las Vegas; Sheridan | Las Vegas, NV |
| G | 11 | Braian Angola | 6 ft 6 in (1.98 m) | 195 lb (88 kg) | Jr | Findlay Prep; North Idaho | Villanueva, Colombia |
| G | 14 | Terance Mann | 6 ft 6 in (1.98 m) | 204 lb (93 kg) | So | Tilton School | Lowell, MA |
| G | 20 | Travis Light (W) | 6 ft 5 in (1.96 m) | 165 lb (75 kg) | Fr | Montverde Academy | Vienna, VA |
| C | 21 | Christ Koumadje | 7 ft 4 in (2.24 m) | 233 lb (106 kg) | So | Montverde Academy | N'Djamena, Chad |
| G | 22 | Xavier Rathan-Mayes | 6 ft 4 in (1.93 m) | 208 lb (94 kg) | RS Jr | Huntington Prep | Scarborough, ON |
| F | 23 | Jarquez Smith | 6 ft 9 in (2.06 m) | 236 lb (107 kg) | Sr | Jones County | Haddock, GA |
| F | 25 | Mfiondu Kabengele | 6 ft 9 in (2.06 m) | 235 lb (107 kg) | Fr | Don Bosco Prep | Burlington, ON |
| F | 33 | Will Miles (W) | 6 ft 6 in (1.98 m) | 220 lb (100 kg) | Fr | Trinity Prep | Orlando, FL |
| F | 40 | Brandon Allen (W) | 6 ft 6 in (1.98 m) | 209 lb (95 kg) | Sr | Milton | Milton, FL |
| C | 50 | Michael Ojo | 7 ft 1 in (2.16 m) | 304 lb (138 kg) | RS Sr | Tennessee Temple | Lagos, Nigeria |

Head coach

- Leonard Hamilton (UT Martin)

Assistant coach(es)

- Stan Jones (Memphis)
- Dennis Gates (California)
- Charlton Young (Georgia Southern)

Legend

- (C) Team captain
- (S) Suspended
- (I) Ineligible
- (W) Walk-on
- Injured
- Current redshirt

Roster

== Schedule ==
| Date time, TV | Rank^{#} | Opponent^{#} | Result | Record | High points | High rebounds | High assists | Site (attendance) city, state |
Exhibition
| October 27*; 7:00 p.m. | | Southeastern (FL) | W 119–58 | | 20 – Cofer | 13 – Ojo | 8 – Rathan-Mayes | Donald L. Tucker Center; Tallahassee, FL |
| November 3*; 7:00 p.m. | | Valdosta State | W 104–76 | | 20 – Isaac | 7 – Ojo | 5 – Bacon | Donald L. Tucker Center; Tallahassee, FL |
Non-conference regular season
| November 12*; 1:00 p.m., ACCN Extra | | Charleston Southern | W 88–67 | 1–0 | 23 – Bacon | 9 – Bacon | 7 – Rathan-Mayes | Donald L. Tucker Center (6,880); Tallahassee, FL |
| November 15*; 7:00 p.m., ACCN Extra | | Iona | W 99–78 | 2–0 | 20 – Isaac | 7 – Smith | 3 – Mann | Donald L. Tucker Center (4,530); Tallahassee, FL |
| November 18*; 7:00 p.m., ACCN Extra | | Winthrop; NIT Season Tip-Off | W 100–86 | 3–0 | 15 – Bacon | 10 – Ojo | 9 – Rathan-Mayes | Donald L. Tucker Center (5,197); Tallahassee, FL |
| November 20*; 5:00 p.m., ACCN Extra | | Detroit; NIT Season Tip-Off | W 100–71 | 4–0 | 22 – Bacon | 10 – Isaac | 5 – Forrest | Donald L. Tucker Center (4,962); Tallahassee, FL |
| November 24*; 12:30 p.m., ESPNU | No. 25 | vs. Temple; NIT Season Tip-Off semifinals | L 86–89 | 4–1 | 22 – Bacon | 7 – Isaac | 6 – Rathan-Mayes | Barclays Center (2,451); Brooklyn, NY |
| November 25*; 12:30 p.m., ESPNU | No. 25 | vs. Illinois; NIT Season Tip-Off third place game | W 72–61 | 5–1 | 17 – Bacon | 7 – Isaac | 2 – Tied | Barclays Center (3,713); Brooklyn, NY |
| November 28*; 7:00 p.m., ESPNU | | Minnesota; ACC–Big Ten Challenge | W 75–67 | 6–1 | 18 – Bacon | 13 – Isaac | 2 – Tied | Donald L. Tucker Center (5,993); Tallahassee, FL |
| December 4*; 4:00 p.m., CBSSN | | vs. George Washington; BB&T Classic | W 67–48 | 7–1 | 11 – Tied | 6 – Tied | 5 – Tied | Verizon Center (1,645); Washington, D.C. |
| December 6*; 7:00 p.m., ACCN Extra | | Southern Miss | W 98–49 | 8–1 | 27 – Savoy | 9 – Forrest | 7 – Rathan-Mayes | Donald L. Tucker Center (5,116); Tallahassee, FL |
| December 8*; 9:00 p.m., ESPNU | | Nicholls State | W 118–63 | 9–1 | 18 – Savoy | 7 – Rathan-Mayes | 7 – Rathan-Mayes | Donald L. Tucker Center (4,807); Tallahassee, FL |
| December 11*; 4:00 p.m., ESPNU | | No. 21 Florida; Rivalry | W 83–78 | 10–1 | 24 – Bacon | 10 – Mann | 2 – Tied | Donald L. Tucker Center (10,029); Tallahassee, FL |
| December 17*; 1:30 p.m., FS2 | No. 23 | vs. Manhattan; Orange Bowl Basketball Classic | W 83–67 | 11–1 | 16 – Bacon | 9 – Issac | 5 – Rathan-Mayes | BB&T Center; Sunrise, FL |
| December 19*; 2:00 p.m., ACCN Extra | No. 21 | Samford | W 76–68 | 12–1 | 19 – Mann | 6 – Bacon | 5 – Rathan-Mayes | Donald L. Tucker Center (4,405); Tallahassee, FL |
ACC regular season
| December 28; 5:00 p.m., ESPN2 | No. 20 | Wake Forest | W 88–72 | 13–1 (1–0) | 23 – Tied | 9 – Isaac | 2 – Tied | Donald L. Tucker Center (8,873); Tallahassee, FL |
| December 31; 2:00 p.m., ESPNU | No. 20 | at No. 12 Virginia | W 60–58 | 14–1 (2–0) | 29 – Bacon | 9 – Isaac | 3 – Rathan-Mayes | John Paul Jones Arena (14,623); Charlottesville, VA |
| January 7; 2:00 p.m., ACCN | No. 12 | No. 21 Virginia Tech | W 93–78 | 15–1 (3–0) | 22 – Mann | 9 – Mann | 8 – Rathan-Mayes | Donald L. Tucker Center (9,149); Tallahassee, FL |
| January 10; 8:00 p.m., ACCN | No. 9 | No. 7 Duke | W 88–72 | 16–1 (4–0) | 21 – Rathan-Mayes | 7 – Mann | 5 – Bacon | Donald L. Tucker Center (11,675); Tallahassee, FL |
| January 14; 2:00 p.m., ESPN | No. 9 | at No. 11 North Carolina | L 83–96 | 16–2 (4–1) | 18 – Bacon | 12 – Isaac | 6 – Rathan-Mayes | Dean E. Smith Center (21,750); Chapel Hill, NC |
| January 18; 7:00 p.m., RSN | No. 10 | No. 15 Notre Dame | W 83–80 | 17–2 (5–1) | 23 – Isaac | 10 – Isaac | 7 – Rathan-Mayes | Donald L. Tucker Center (10,535); Tallahassee, FL |
| January 21; 2:00 p.m., ESPN | No. 10 | No. 12 Louisville | W 73–68 | 18–2 (6–1) | 16 – Tied | 10 – Isaac | 3 – Rathan-Mayes | Donald L. Tucker Center (11,675); Tallahassee, FL |
| January 25; 7:00 p.m., RSN | No. 6 | at Georgia Tech | L 56–78 | 18–3 (6–2) | 12 – Bacon | 8 – Isaac | 3 – Mann | Hank McCamish Pavilion (6,542); Atlanta, GA |
| January 28; 12:00 p.m., ESPN2 | No. 6 | at Syracuse | L 72–82 | 18–4 (6–3) | 19 – Tied | 12 – Isaac | 5 – Rathan-Mayes | Carrier Dome (24,978); Syracuse, NY |
| February 1; 8:00 p.m., ACCN | No. 15 | at Miami (FL) | W 75–57 | 19–4 (7–3) | 15 – Tied | 7 – Isaac | 4 – Rathan-Mayes | BankUnited Center (7,972); Coral Gables, FL |
| February 5; 12:30 p.m., ESPNU | No. 15 | Clemson | W 109–61 | 20–4 (8–3) | 29 – Bacon | 5 – Isaac | 9 – Rathan-Mayes | Donald L. Tucker Center (10,868); Tallahassee, FL |
| February 8; 7:00 p.m., ESPN2 | No. 14 | NC State | W 95–71 | 21–4 (9–3) | 21 – Isaac | 10 – Mann | 5 – Mann | Donald L. Tucker Center (9,432); Tallahassee, FL |
| February 11; 6:00 p.m., ESPN | No. 14 | at Notre Dame | L 72–84 | 21–5 (9–4) | 15 – Mann | 6 – Tied | 3 – Tied | Edmund P. Joyce Center (9,149); Notre Dame, IN |
| February 18; 4:00 p.m., ESPN2 | No. 17 | at Pittsburgh | L 66–80 | 21–6 (9–5) | 12 – Rathan-Mayes | 7 – Mann | 6 – Rathan-Mayes | Peterson Events Center (10,525); Pittsburgh, PA |
| February 20; 7:00 p.m., ESPNU | No. 19 | Boston College | W 104–72 | 22–6 (10–5) | 16 – Bacon | 5 – Tied | 10 – Rathan-Mayes | Donald L. Tucker Center (9,609); Tallahassee, FL |
| February 25; 12:00 p.m., ACCN | No. 19 | at Clemson | W 76–74 | 23–6 (11–5) | 15 – Rathan-Mayes | 5 – Forrest | 7 – Rathan-Mayes | Littlejohn Coliseum (9,000); Clemson, SC |
| February 28; 7:00 p.m., ESPN | No. 15 | at No. 17 Duke | L 70–75 | 23–7 (11–6) | 19 – Bacon | 9 – Forrest | 3 – Bacon | Cameron Indoor Stadium (9,314); Durham, NC |
| March 4; 4:00 p.m., ACCN | No. 15 | No. 25 Miami (FL) | W 66–57 | 24–7 (12–6) | 23 – Bacon | 6 – Mann | 4 – Rathan-Mayes | Donald L. Tucker Center (11,675); Tallahassee, FL |
ACC Tournament
| March 9; 7:00 p.m., ESPN/ACCN | (2) No. 16 | vs. (7) Virginia Tech; Quarterfinals | W 74–68 | 25–7 | 17 – Bacon | 12 – Isaac | 6 – Rathan-Mayes | Barclays Center (17,732); Brooklyn, NY |
| March 10; 9:00 p.m., ESPN/ACCN | (2) No. 16 | vs. (3) No. 22 Notre Dame; Semifinals | L 73–77 | 25–8 | 18 – Bacon | 15 – Isaac | 5 – Rathan-Mayes | Barclays Center (18,109); Brooklyn, NY |
NCAA tournament
| March 16*; 9:20 p.m., TNT | (3 W) No. 16 | vs. (14 W) Florida Gulf Coast; First Round | W 86–80 | 26–8 | 25 – Bacon | 10 – Isaac | 5 – Tied | Amway Center (15,869); Orlando, FL |
| March 18*; 6:10 p.m., TNT | (3 W) No. 16 | vs. (11 W) Xavier; Second Round | L 66–91 | 26–9 | 20 – Bacon | 12 – Isaac | 3 – Tied | Amway Center (17,308); Orlando, FL |
*Non-conference game. ^{#}Rankings from AP Poll. (#) Tournament seedings in parentheses. W=West Region. All times are in Eastern Time.

== Rankings ==
Ranking movements Legend: ██ Increase in ranking ██ Decrease in ranking RV = Received votes
| | Week | | | | | | | | | | | | | | | | | | | |
| Poll | Pre | 1 | 2 | 3 | 4 | 5 | 6 | 7 | 8 | 9 | 10 | 11 | 12 | 13 | 14 | 15 | 16 | 17 | 18 | Final |
|---|---|---|---|---|---|---|---|---|---|---|---|---|---|---|---|---|---|---|---|---|
| AP | RV | RV | 25 | RV | RV | 23 | 21 | 20 | 12 | 9 | 10 | 6 | 15 | 14 | 17 | 19 | 15 | 16 | 16 | Not released |
| Coaches | RV | RV | RV | RV | RV | 23 | 22 | 20 | 13 | 10 | 12 | 8 | 16 | 15 | 18 | 20 | 17 | 17 | 18 | 24 |

*AP does not release post-NCAA tournament rankings

== Awards ==
- Julius Erving Award finalist

Dwayne Bacon

=== Watchlists ===
- Julius Erving Award

Dwayne Bacon

- Karl Malone Award

Jonathan Isaac

- Naismith Award

Dwayne Bacon

- Wooden Award

Dwayne Bacon

- Oscar Robertson Trophy

Dwayne Bacon

- Wayman Tisdale Award

Jonathan Isaac

=== Honors ===
Weekly Awards
| Player | Award | Date Awarded | Ref. |
|---|---|---|---|
| Jonathan Isaac | ACC Freshman of the Week ACC Freshman of the Week; NCAA Player of the Week | November 15–20, 2016; January 18–21, 2017 | |
| Dwayne Bacon | Orange Bowl Classic MVP ACC Player of the Week | December 17, 2016; December 28–31, 2016 | |

==== All-ACC ====
| Name | Selection |
|---|---|
| Dwayne Bacon | Second Team |
| Xavier Rathan-Mayes | Defensive Team |
| Jonathan Isaac | Freshman Team |

==== All-Americans ====
| Name | Selection |
|---|---|
| Jonathan Isaac | Kyle Macy Freshman Team |

== NBA draft ==
Two players were selected in the 2017 NBA draft:

| Round | Pick (Overall) | Name | Team |
|---|---|---|---|
| 1st | 6 | Jonathan Isaac | Orlando Magic |
| 2nd | 10 (40) | Dwayne Bacon | New Orleans Pelicans (traded to Charlotte Hornets) |
