= 2016–17 NCAA Division I men's basketball rankings =

- Season: 2016–17
- NCAA Tournament: 2017
- Preseason No. 1: Duke
- NCAA Tournament Champions: North Carolina
NCAA Division I men's basketball rankings


Two human polls make up the 2016–17 NCAA Division I men's basketball rankings, the AP Poll and the Coaches Poll, in addition to various publications' preseason polls.

== Legend ==
	Increase in ranking
	Decrease in ranking
	New to rankings from previous week
Italics	Number of first place votes
(#–#)	Win–loss record
т	Tied with team above or below also with this symbol

== AP Poll ==
	Preseason Oct 31	Week 2 Nov 14	Week 3 Nov 21	Week 4 Nov 28	Week 5 Dec 5	Week 6 Dec 12	Week 7 Dec 19	Week 8 Dec 26	Week 9 Jan 2	Week 10 Jan 9	Week 11 Jan 16	Week 12 Jan 23	Week 13 Jan 30	Week 14 Feb 6	Week 15 Feb 13	Week 16 Feb 20	Week 17 Feb 27	Week 18 Mar 6	Week 19 Mar 13	
1.	Duke (58)	Duke (2–0) (58)	Kentucky (4–0) (42)	Kentucky (7–0) (40)	Villanova (8–0) (57)	Villanova (10–0) (56)	Villanova (11–0) (56)	Villanova (12–0) (56)	Villanova (14–0) (59)	Baylor (15–0) (55)	Villanova (17–1) (28)	Villanova (19–1) (35)	Gonzaga (22–0) (46)	Gonzaga (24–0) (59)	Gonzaga (26–0) (60)	Gonzaga (28–0) (59)	Kansas (26–3) (58)	Kansas (28–3) (59)	Villanova (31-3) (59)	1.
2.	Kentucky (2)	Kentucky (2–0) (1)	Villanova (5–0) (21)	Villanova (6–0) (20)	UCLA (9–0) (2)	UCLA (10–0) (3)	UCLA (12–0) (3)	UCLA (13–0) (3)	Baylor (13–0) (6)	Kansas (14–1) (8)	Kansas (16–1) (32)	Kansas (18–1) (28)	Baylor (20–1) (6)	Villanova (22–2) (6)	Villanova (24–2) (5)	Villanova (26–2) (5)	Villanova (27–3) (2)	Villanova (28–3) (2)	Gonzaga (32-1) (6)	2.
3.	Kansas	Villanova (1–0) (5)	Indiana (3–0) (1)	North Carolina (7–0) (4)	Kansas (7–1)	Kansas (9–1)	Kansas (10–1)	Kansas (11–1)	Kansas (12–1)	Villanova (15-1) (1)	UCLA (18–1) (3)	Gonzaga (19–0) (2)	Kansas (19–2) (9)	Kansas (20–3)	Kansas (22–3)	Kansas (24–3) (1)	UCLA (26–3) (3)	UCLA (28–3) (3)	Kansas (28-4)	3.
4.	Villanova (4)	Oregon (1–0)	North Carolina (4–0)	Kansas (5–1)	Baylor (8–0) (6)	Baylor (8–0) (6)	Baylor (11–0) (6)	Baylor (12–0) (6)	UCLA (14–1)	UCLA (16–1)	Gonzaga (17–0) (2)	Kentucky (17–2)	Villanova (20–2) (4)	Louisville (19–4)	Baylor (22–3)	Arizona (25–3)	Gonzaga (29–1) (2)	Gonzaga (30–1) (1)	Arizona (30-4)	4.
5.	Oregon (1)	North Carolina (2–0)	Kansas (2–1)	Duke (6–1)	Duke (8–1)	Duke (10–1)	Duke (10–1)	Duke (12–1)	Gonzaga (14–0)	Gonzaga (15–0)	Kentucky (15–2)	Baylor (18–1)	Arizona (20–2)	Oregon (21–3)	Arizona (23–3)	UCLA (24–3)	North Carolina (25–5)	Oregon (27–4)	North Carolina (27-7)	5.
6.	North Carolina	Indiana (1–0) (1)	Duke (4–1)	Virginia (6–0)	Kentucky (7–1)	Kentucky (9–1)	Kentucky (10–1)	Louisville (11–1)	Kentucky (11–2)	Kentucky (13–2)	Baylor (16–1)	Florida State (18–2)	Louisville (18–4)	Baylor (20–3)	UCLA (23–3)	Oregon (24–4)	Oregon (26–4)	North Carolina (26–6)	Kentucky (29-5)	6.
7.	Xavier	Kansas (0–1)	Virginia (3–0)	Xavier (6–0)	North Carolina (8–1)	North Carolina (10–1)	Gonzaga (11–0)	Gonzaga (12–0)	West Virginia (12–1)	Duke (14–2)	West Virginia (15–2) т	Arizona (18–2)	West Virginia (17–4)	Wisconsin (20–3)	Oregon (22–4)	Louisville (22–5)	Arizona (26–4)	Arizona (27–4)	Duke (27-8)	7.
8.	Virginia	Virginia (1–0)	Arizona (3–0)	Gonzaga (6–0)	Gonzaga (8–0)	Gonzaga (10–0)	North Carolina (10–2)	Kentucky (10–2)	Duke (12–2)	Creighton (15–1)	Creighton (17–1) т	UCLA (19–2)	Kentucky (17–4)	North Carolina (21–4)	Louisville (20–5)	North Carolina (23–5)	Louisville (23–6)	Kentucky (26–5)	UCLA (29-4)	8.
9.	Wisconsin	Wisconsin (1–0)	Xavier (5–0)	Baylor (6–0)	Indiana (7–1)	Indiana (8–1)	Creighton (11–0)	North Carolina (11–2)	Louisville (12–2)	Florida State (15–1)	North Carolina (16–3)	North Carolina (18–3)	Virginia (16–4)	Arizona (21–3)	West Virginia (20–5)	Baylor (22–5)	Kentucky (24–5)	Baylor (25–6)	Oregon (29-5)	9.
10.	Arizona	Arizona (1–0)	Louisville (3–0)	Creighton (6–0)	Creighton (8–0)	Creighton (10–0)	Louisville (10–1)	Creighton (12–0)	Creighton (13–1)	West Virginia (13–2)	Florida State (16–2)	Oregon (18–2)	Wisconsin (18–3)	UCLA (21–3)	North Carolina (21–5)	Duke (22–5)	West Virginia (23–6)	Louisville (24–7)	Louisville (24-8)	10.
11.	Indiana	Xavier (1–0)	Gonzaga (3–0)	UCLA (7–0)	Louisville (7–1)	Louisville (9–1)	West Virginia (9–1)	West Virginia (11–1)	Virginia (11–2)	North Carolina (14–3)	Oregon (16–2)	Butler (17–3)	UCLA (19–3)	Cincinnati (21–2)	Wisconsin (21–4)	Kentucky (22–5)	Baylor (23–6)	West Virginia (24–7)	SMU (30-4)	11.
12.	Michigan State	Louisville (1–0)	Creighton (4–0)	Saint Mary's (5–0)	Saint Mary's (6–0)	West Virginia (8–1)	Virginia (9–1)	Virginia (10–1)	Florida State (14–1)	Butler (14–2)	Louisville (15–3)	Virginia (15–3)	North Carolina (19–4)	Virginia (17–5)	Duke (20–5)	West Virginia (21–6)	Florida (23–6)	SMU (27–4)	Baylor (25-7)	12.
13.	Louisville	Michigan State (0–1)	Oregon (2–1)	Indiana (4–1)	Xavier (7–1)	Virginia (8–1)	Butler (10–1)	Butler (11–1)	Wisconsin (12–2)	Oregon (15–2)	Butler (15–3)	Louisville (16–4)	Oregon (19–3)	West Virginia (18–5)	Kentucky (20–5)	Florida (22–5)	Butler (23–6)	Purdue (25–6)	West Virginia (26-8)	13.
14.	Gonzaga	Gonzaga (1–0)	UCLA (4–0)	Louisville (5–1)	Virginia (7–1)	Wisconsin (9–2)	Wisconsin (10–2)	Wisconsin (11–2)	North Carolina (12–3)	Louisville (13–3)	Arizona (16–2)	Notre Dame (17–3)	Cincinnati (19–2)	Florida State (20–4)	Virginia (18–6)	Purdue (22–5)	SMU (25–4)	Duke (23–8)	Notre Dame (25-9)	14.
15.	Purdue	Purdue (1–0)	Saint Mary's (3–0)	Purdue (5–1)	West Virginia (6–1)	Purdue (8–2)	Purdue (9–2)	Purdue (11–2)	Oregon (13–2)	Xavier (13–2)	Notre Dame (16–2)	Wisconsin (16–3)	Florida State (18–4)	Kentucky (18–5)	Florida (20–5)	Cincinnati (24–3)	Florida State (23–6)	Cincinnati (27–4)	Purdue (25-7)	15.
16.	UCLA	UCLA (2–0)	Wisconsin (2–1)	Arizona (5–1)	Butler (8–0)	South Carolina (8–0)	Indiana (8–2)	Indiana (10–2)	Xavier (12–2)	Arizona (15–2)	Virginia (13–3)	Creighton (18–2)	Butler (18–4)	Purdue (19–5)	Purdue (20–5)	Wisconsin (22–5)	Purdue (23–6)	Florida State (24–7)	Florida State (25-8) т	16.
17.	Saint Mary's	Saint Mary's (1–0)	Purdue (2–1)	Wisconsin (5–2)	Wisconsin (7–2)	Xavier (8–2)	Xavier (8–2)	Xavier (10–2)	Arizona (13–2)	Purdue (14–3)	Wisconsin (14–3)	Duke (15–4)	Maryland (19–2)	Florida (18–5)	Florida State (21–5)	SMU (24–4)	Duke (22–7)	Florida (24–7)	Iowa State (23-10) т	17.
18.	UConn	Syracuse (1–0)	Syracuse (3–0)	Butler (6–0)	Purdue (6–2)	Butler (9–1)	Arizona (10–2)	Arizona (11–2)	Butler (12–2)	Wisconsin (13–3)	Duke (14–4)	West Virginia (15–4)	Saint Mary's (19–2)	Duke (18–5)	Cincinnati (22–3)	Virginia (18–8)	Cincinnati (25–4)	Butler (23–7)	Cincinnati (29-5)	18.
19.	Syracuse	West Virginia (1–0)	West Virginia (3–0)	Iowa State (5–1)	South Carolina (8–0)	Arizona (8–2)	Saint Mary's (8–1)	Saint Mary's (10–1)	Saint Mary's (12–1)	Virginia (12–3)	Florida (14–3)	Cincinnati (17–2)	South Carolina (17–4)	South Carolina (19–4)	SMU (22–4)	Florida State (21–6)	Notre Dame (22–7)	Saint Mary's (27–3)	Wichita State (30-4)	19.
20.	West Virginia	Iowa State (1–0)	Baylor (3–0)	South Carolina (6–0)	Arizona (6–2)	Saint Mary's (7–1)	Oregon (10–2)	Florida State (12–1)	Purdue (12–3)	Notre Dame (14–2)	Cincinnati (15–2)	Purdue (16–4)	Notre Dame (17–5)	Saint Mary's (21–2)	Creighton (21–4)	Saint Mary's (24–3)	Saint Mary's (26–3)	Wichita State (30–4)	Florida (24-8)	20.
21.	Texas	Rhode Island (1–0)	Iowa State (3–0)	Rhode Island (5–1)	Florida (7–1)	Notre Dame (9–1)	Florida State (11–1)	Oregon (11-2)	Virginia Tech (12-1)	Saint Mary's (14–1)	Purdue (14–4)	Saint Mary's (17–2)	Duke (16–5)	Maryland (20–3)	South Carolina (20–5)	Notre Dame (21–7)	Wichita State (27–4)	Virginia (21–9)	Butler (23-8)	21.
22.	Creighton	Creighton (1–0)	Texas (3–0)	Syracuse (4–1)	Cincinnati (7–1)	Oregon (8–2)	South Carolina (9–1)	USC (13–0)	Cincinnati (12–2)	Cincinnati (13–2)	Xavier (13–4)	Maryland (17–2)	Creighton (19–3)	Butler (18–5)	Saint Mary's (22–3)	Butler (21–6)	Wisconsin (22–7)	Notre Dame (23–7)	Saint Mary's (28-4)	22.
23.	Rhode Island	Texas (1–0)	Rhode Island (4–1)	Oregon (4–2)	Notre Dame (8–0)	Florida State (10–1)	USC (10–0)	Cincinnati (10–2)	Notre Dame (12–2)	Florida (12–3)	Saint Mary's (15–2)	South Carolina (15–4)	Purdue (17–5)	Creighton (20–4)	Maryland (21–4)	Creighton (22–5)	Virginia (19–9)	Iowa State (20–10)	Michigan (24-11)	23.
24.	Iowa State	Cincinnati (1–0)	Michigan State (2–2)	Florida (4–1)	Oregon (7–2)	USC (9–0)	Cincinnati (9–2)	Notre Dame (10–2)	Florida (10–3)	Minnesota (15-2)	South Carolina (14–3)	Xavier (14–5)	Florida (16–5)	Xavier (17–6)	Butler (19–6)	Maryland (22–5)	Iowa State (19–9)	Wisconsin (23–8)	Virginia (22-10)	24.
25.	Maryland	California (1–0)	Florida State (4–0) т Michigan (4–0) т	West Virginia (4–1)	Iowa State (5–2)	Cincinnati (7–2)	Notre Dame (9–2)	Florida (9–3)	Indiana (10–4) т; USC (14–1) т	Kansas State (13–2) т; USC (15–2) т	Maryland (16–2)	Florida (14–5)	Northwestern (18–4)	SMU (20–4)	Notre Dame (19–7)	Wichita State (25–4)	Miami (20–8)	Maryland (24–7)	Wisconsin (25-9)	25.
	Preseason Oct 31	Week 2 Nov 14	Week 3 Nov 21	Week 4 Nov 28	Week 5 Dec 5	Week 6 Dec 12	Week 7 Dec 19	Week 8 Dec 26	Week 9 Jan 2	Week 10 Jan 9	Week 11 Jan 16	Week 12 Jan 23	Week 13 Jan 30	Week 14 Feb 6	Week 15 Feb 13	Week 16 Feb 20	Week 17 Feb 27	Week 18 Mar 6	Week 19 Mar 13	
		Dropped: UConn (0–1); Maryland (1–0)	Dropped: Cincinnati (3–1); California (2–0)	Dropped: Florida State (5–1); Michigan (5–1); Michigan State (4–3); Texas (3–2)	Dropped: Rhode Island (5–3); Syracuse (5–2)	Dropped: Florida (7–3); Iowa State (6–3)	None	Dropped: South Carolina (9–2)	None	Dropped: Virginia Tech (12–3); Indiana (11–5)	Dropped: Minnesota (15–4); Kansas State (13–4); USC (16–3)	None	Dropped: Xavier (15–6)	Dropped: Northwestern (18–5); Notre Dame (17–7)	Dropped: Xavier (18–7)	Dropped: South Carolina (20–7)	Dropped: Creighton (22–7); Maryland (22–7)	Dropped: Miami (20–10)	Dropped: Maryland (24-8)	

== USA Today Coaches Poll ==
The Coaches Poll is the second oldest poll still in use after the AP Poll. It is compiled by a rotating group of 31 college Division I head coaches. The Poll operates by Borda count. Each voting member ranks teams from 1 to 25. Each team then receives points for their ranking in reverse order: Number 1 earns 25 points, number 2 earns 24 points, and so forth. The points are then combined and the team with the highest points is then ranked No. 1; second highest is ranked No. 2 and so forth. Only the top 25 teams with points are ranked, with teams receiving first place votes noted the quantity next to their name. The maximum points a single team can earn is 775.

	Preseason Oct 20	Week 2 Nov 14	Week 3 Nov 21	Week 4 Nov 28	Week 5 Dec 5	Week 6 Dec 12	Week 7 Dec 19	Week 8 Dec 26	Week 9 Jan 2	Week 10 Jan 9	Week 11 Jan 16	Week 12 Jan 23	Week 13 Jan 30	Week 14 Feb 6	Week 15 Feb 13	Week 16 Feb 20	Week 17 Feb 27	Week 18 Mar 6	Week 19 Mar 12	Week 20 Apr 4	
1.	Duke (27)	Duke (2–0) (27)	Kentucky (4–0) (20)	Kentucky (6–0) (23)	Villanova (8–0) (28)	Villanova (10–0) (28)	Villanova (11–0) (28)	Villanova (12–0) (27)	Villanova (14–0) (30)	Baylor (15–0) (22)	Kansas (16–1) (23)	Kansas (18–1) (18)	Gonzaga (22–0) (24)	Gonzaga (24–0) (28)	Gonzaga (26–0) (29)	Gonzaga (28–0) (29)	Kansas (26–3) (23)	Kansas (28–3) (27)	Villanova (31–3) (27)	North Carolina (33–7) (31)	1.
2.	Kansas (1)	Kentucky (2–0) (2)	Villanova (5–0) (4)	Villanova (6–0) (2)	UCLA (9–0) (1)	UCLA (10–0) (2)	UCLA (12–0) (2)	UCLA (13–0) (2)	Kansas (12–1) (1)	Kansas (14–1) (9)	Villanova (17–1) (4)	Villanova (19–1) (11)	Kansas (19–2) (7)	Villanova (22–2) (4)	Villanova (24–2) (3)	Villanova (26–2) (3)	UCLA (26–3) (3)	Villanova (28–3) (2)	Gonzaga (32–1) (1)	Gonzaga (37–2)	2.
3.	Villanova (1)	Villanova (1–0) (2)	Duke (4–1) (5)	North Carolina (7–0) (2)	Kansas (7–1) (1)	Kansas (9–1) (1)	Kansas (10–1) (1)	Kansas (11–1) (1)	Baylor (13–0)	Villanova (15–1) (1)	UCLA (18–1) (2)	Gonzaga (19–0) (3)	Baylor (20–1)	Kansas (20–3)	Kansas (22–3)	Kansas (24–3)	Villanova (27–3) (5)	UCLA (28–3) (2)	Kansas (28–4) (2)	Oregon (33–6)	3.
4.	Kentucky (2)	Oregon (1–0) (1)	North Carolina (4–0)	Duke (6–1) (2)	Duke (8–1) (2)	Duke (8–1) (1)	Duke (10–1) (1)	Baylor (12–0)	Gonzaga (14–0)	UCLA (16–1)	Gonzaga (17–0) (3)	Kentucky (17–2)	Villanova (20–2) (1)	Louisville (19–4)	Baylor (22–3)	Arizona (25–3)	Gonzaga (29–1) (1)	Gonzaga (30–1) (1)	Arizona (30–4)	Kansas (31–5)	4.
5.	Oregon (1)	Indiana (1–0)	Indiana (3–0) т(2)	Kansas (5–1)	North Carolina (8–1)	Baylor (8–0)	Kentucky (10–1)	Duke (12–1) (1)	UCLA (14–1)	Gonzaga (15–0)	Kentucky (15–2)	Baylor (18–1)	Arizona (20–2)	Wisconsin (20–3)	UCLA (23–3)	UCLA (24–3)	North Carolina (25–5)	Oregon (27–4)	Kentucky (29–5)	Kentucky (32–6)	5.
6.	North Carolina	North Carolina (2–0)	Kansas (2–1) т	Virginia (6–0)	Baylor (8–0)	North Carolina (10–1)	Baylor (11–0)	Gonzaga (12–0)	Kentucky (11–2)	Kentucky (13–2)	Baylor (16–1)	North Carolina (18–3)	Kentucky (17–4)	Oregon (21–3)	Arizona (23–3)	Louisville (22–5)	Oregon (26–4)	North Carolina (26–6)	UCLA (29–4)	South Carolina (26–11)	6.
7.	Virginia	Virginia (1–0)	Virginia (3–0) т	Xavier (6–0)	Kentucky (7–1)	Kentucky (9–1)	Gonzaga (11–0)	Louisville (11–1)	West Virginia (11–1)	Duke (14–2)	Creighton (17–1)	UCLA (19–2)	Louisville (18–4)	North Carolina (21–4)	Louisville (20–5)	Oregon (24–4)	Louisville (23–6)	Arizona (27–4)	Duke (27–8)	Arizona (32–5)	7.
8.	Xavier	Kansas (0–1)	Xavier (5–0)	Gonzaga (6–0)	Gonzaga (8–0)	Gonzaga (10–0)	North Carolina (10–2)	Kentucky (10–2)	Duke (12–2)	Creighton (15–1)	West Virginia (15–2)	Florida State (18–2)	UCLA (19–3)	Baylor (20–3)	Oregon (22–4)	North Carolina (23–5)	Arizona (26–4)	Kentucky (26–5)	North Carolina (27–7)	Villanova (32–4)	8.
9.	Michigan State	Arizona (1–0)	Arizona (3–0)	UCLA (7–0)	Indiana (7–1)	Indiana (8–1)	Creighton (11–0)	Creighton (12–0)	Louisville (12–2)	West Virginia (13–2)	North Carolina (16–3)	Arizona (18–2)	Wisconsin (18–3)	UCLA (21–3)	North Carolina (21–5)	Baylor (22–5)	Kentucky (24–5)	Louisville (24–7)	Oregon (29–5)	UCLA (31–5)	9.
10.	Wisconsin	Xavier (1–0)	Louisville (3–0)	Indiana (4–1)	Creighton (8–0)	Creighton (10–0)	Virginia (9–1)	North Carolina (11–2)	Creighton (13–1)	Florida State (15–1)	Oregon (16–2)	Oregon (18–2)	North Carolina (19–4)	Arizona (21–3)	Wisconsin (21–4)	Kentucky (22–5)	West Virginia (23–6)	Baylor (25–6)	Louisville (24–8)	Florida (27–9)	10.
11.	Arizona	Wisconsin (1–0)	Gonzaga (3–0)	Baylor (6–0)	Saint Mary's (6–0)	Louisville (9–1)	Louisville (10–1)	Virginia (10–1)	Wisconsin (12-2)	Oregon (15–2)	Louisville (15–3)	Butler (17–3)	Virginia (16–4)	Cincinnati (21–2)	Kentucky (20–5)	Duke (22–5)	Baylor (23–6)	West Virginia (24–7)	Baylor (25–7)	West Virginia (28–9)	11.
12.	Indiana	Louisville (1–0)	Oregon (2–1)	Creighton (6–0)	Virginia (7–1)	Virginia (8–1)	West Virginia (9–1)	West Virginia (11–1)	Virginia (11–2)	North Carolina (14–3)	Florida State (16–2)	Notre Dame (17–3)	West Virginia (17–4)	Kentucky (18–5)	West Virginia (20–5)	Florida (22–5)	Florida (23–6)	Purdue (25–6)	West Virginia (26–8)	Baylor (27–8)	12.
13.	Gonzaga	Michigan State (0–1)	UCLA (4–0)	Saint Mary's (5–0)	Louisville (7–1)	West Virginia (8–1)	Butler (10–1)	Butler (11–1)	Florida State (14-1)	Butler (14–2)	Arizona (16–2)	Virginia (15–3)	Oregon (19–3)	Virginia (17–5)	Florida (20–5)	West Virginia (21–6)	Notre Dame (22–7)	Florida (24–7)	SMU (30–4)	Duke (28–9)	13.
14.	Louisville	Gonzaga (1–0)	Wisconsin (2–1)	Louisville (5–1)	Xavier (7–1)	Wisconsin (9–2)	Wisconsin (10–2)	Wisconsin (11–2)	Oregon (13-2)	Xavier (13–2)	Butler (15–3)	Louisville (16–4)	Cincinnati (19–2)	West Virginia (18–5)	Duke (20–5)	Purdue (22–5)	Duke (22–7)	Duke (23–8)	Notre Dame (25–9)	Louisville (25–9)	14.
15.	Purdue	Purdue (1–0)	Saint Mary's (3–0)	Arizona (5–1)	Butler (8–0)	South Carolina (8–0)	Purdue (9–2)	Purdue (11–2)	Xavier (12-2)	Louisville (13–3)	Notre Dame (16–2)	Wisconsin (16–3)	Butler (18–4)	Florida State (20–4)	Virginia (18–6)	Wisconsin (22–5)	Butler (23–6)	SMU (27–4)	Purdue (25–7)	Purdue (27–8)	15.
16.	UConn	UCLA (2–0)	Syracuse (3–0)	Purdue (5–1)	West Virginia (6–1)	Purdue (8–2)	Indiana (8–2)	Indiana (10–2)	North Carolina (12–3)	Arizona (15–2)	Virginia (13–3)	Creighton (18–2)	Florida State (18–4)	South Carolina (19–4)	Purdue (20–5)	Cincinnati (24–3)	Purdue (23–6)	Notre Dame (23–8)	Cincinnati (29–5)	Wisconsin (27–10)	16.
17.	Syracuse	Saint Mary's (1–0)	West Virginia (3–0)	Wisconsin (5–2)	Wisconsin (7–2)	Xavier (8–2)	Xavier (9–2)	Xavier (10–2)	Arizona (13-2)	Wisconsin (13–3)	Wisconsin (14–3)	Duke (15–4)	Maryland (19–2)	Florida (18–5)	Cincinnati (22–3)	Notre Dame (21–7)	Florida State (23–6)	Florida State (24–7)	Florida (24–8)	Michigan (26–12)	17.
18.	West Virginia	Syracuse (1–0)	Creighton (4–0)	Butler (6–0)	South Carolina (8–0)	Butler (9–1)	Arizona (10–2)	Arizona (11–2)	Butler (12-2)	Virginia (12–3)	Duke (14–4)	West Virginia (15–4)	Notre Dame (17–5)	Purdue (19–5)	Florida State (21–5)	Saint Mary's (24–3)	Saint Mary's (26–3)	Cincinnati (27–4)	Florida State (25–8)	Xavier (24–14)	18.
19.	Saint Mary's	West Virginia (1–0)	Purdue (2–1)	West Virginia (4–1)	Purdue (6–2)	Arizona (8–2)	Saint Mary's (8–1)	Saint Mary's (10–1)	Saint Mary's (12–1)	Purdue (14–3)	Xavier (13–4)	Cincinnati (17–2)	Saint Mary's (19–2)	Duke (18–5)	South Carolina (20–5)	Virginia (18–8)	SMU (25–4)	Saint Mary's (27–3)	Wichita State (30–4)	Butler (25–9)	19.
20.	UCLA	Creighton (1–0)	Michigan State (2–2)	Oregon (4–2)	Arizona (6–2)	Saint Mary's (7–1)	South Carolina (9–1)	Florida State (12–1)	Purdue (12–3)	Notre Dame (14–2)	Cincinnati (15–2)	Purdue (16–4)	South Carolina (17–4)	Saint Mary's (21)	Notre Dame (19–7)	Florida State (21–6)	Cincinnati (25–4)	Butler (23–7)	Iowa State (23–10)	Notre Dame (26–10)	20.
21.	Maryland	Texas (1–0)	Texas (3–0)	Iowa State (5–1)	Florida (7–1)	Notre Dame (9–1)	Oregon (10–2)	Oregon (11–2)	Notre Dame (12–2)	Saint Mary's (14–1)	Florida (14–3)	Saint Mary's (17–2)	Duke (16–5)	Butler (18–5)	Saint Mary's (22–3)	SMU (24–4)	Wisconsin (22–7)	Virginia (21–9)	Saint Mary's (28–4)	Wichita State (31–5)	21.
22.	Texas	Rhode Island (1–0)	Iowa State (3–0)	Maryland (7–0)	Notre Dame (8–0)	Oregon (8–2)	Florida State (11–1)	USC (13–0)	Cincinnati (12–2)	Cincinnati (13–2)	Purdue (14–4)	Xavier (14–5)	Creighton (19–3)	Maryland (20–3)	Creighton (21–4)	Butler (21–6)	Wichita State (27–4)	Wichita State (30–4)	Wisconsin (25–9)	Cincinnati (30–6)	22.
23.	Creighton	Iowa State (1–0)	Maryland (4–0)	South Carolina (6–0)	Cincinnati (7–1)	Cincinnati (7–2)	Cincinnati (9–2)	Cincinnati (10–2)	Virginia Tech (12–1)	Florida (12–3)	Saint Mary's (15–2)	Maryland (1–2)	Florida (16–5)	Creighton (20–4)	SMU (22–4)	Creighton (22–5)	Virginia (19–9)	Wisconsin (23–8)	Virginia (22–10)	SMU (30–5)	23.
24.	Rhode Island	Maryland (1–0)	Michigan (4–0)	Syracuse (4–1)	Oregon (7–2)	Florida State (10–1)	Notre Dame (9–2)	Notre Dame (10–2)	Florida (10–3)	Minnesota (15–2)	South Carolina (14–3)	South Carolina (15–4)	Purdue (17–5)	Notre Dame (17–7)	Maryland (21–4)	Maryland (22–5)	Iowa State (19–9)	Iowa State (20–10)	Butler (23–8)	Florida State (26–9)	24.
25.	Cincinnati	Cincinnati (1–0)	Rhode Island (4–1)	Rhode Island (5–1)	Iowa State (5–2)	USC (9–0)	USC (10–0)	South Carolina (9–2)	Indiana (10–4)	USC (15–2)	Maryland (16–2)	Florida (14–5)	Xavier (15–6)	Xavier (17–6)	Butler (19–6)	Wichita State (25–4)	Miami (20–8)	Middle Tennessee (27–4)	Middle Tennessee (30–4)	Iowa State (24–11)	25.
	Preseason Oct 20	Week 2 Nov 14	Week 3 Nov 21	Week 4 Nov 28	Week 5 Dec 5	Week 6 Dec 12	Week 7 Dec 19	Week 8 Dec 26	Week 9 Jan 2	Week 10 Jan 9	Week 11 Jan 16	Week 12 Jan 23	Week 13 Jan 30	Week 14 Feb 6	Week 15 Feb 13	Week 16 Feb 20	Week 17 Feb 27	Week 18 Mar 6	Week 19 Mar 12	Week 20 Apr 4	
		Dropped: UConn (0–1)	Dropped: Cincinnati (3–1)	Dropped: Michigan (5–1); Michigan State (4–3); Texas (3–2)	Dropped: Maryland (8–1); Rhode Island (5–3); Syracuse (5–2)	Dropped: Florida (7–3); Iowa State (6–3)	None	None	Dropped: USC (14–1); South Carolina (10–2)	Dropped: Virginia Tech (12–3); Indiana (11–5)	Dropped: Minnesota (15–4); USC (16–3)	None	None	None	Dropped: Xavier (18–7)	Dropped: South Carolina (20–7)	Dropped: Creighton (22–7); Maryland (22–7)	Dropped: Miami (20–10)	None	Dropped: Saint Mary's (29–5); Virginia (23–11); Middle Tennessee (31–5)	

== See also ==
2016–17 NCAA Division I women's basketball rankings
