= London Perrantes =

American basketball player (born 1994)

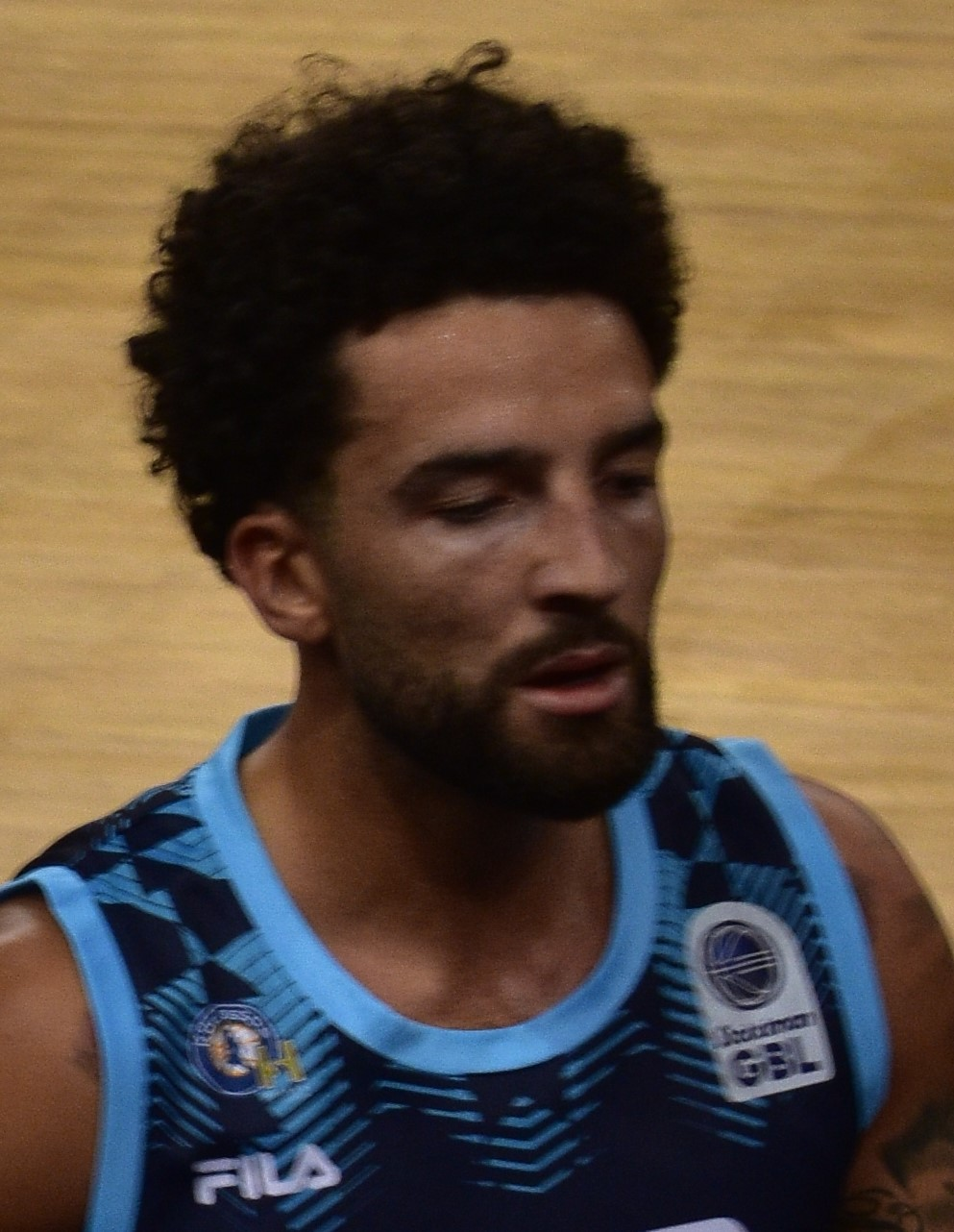
- Perrantes with Kolossos Rodou

No. 32 – Science City Jena
- Position: Point guard
- League: Basketball Bundesliga

Personal information
- Born: October 3, 1994 (age 32) Los Angeles, California, U.S.
- Listed height: 6 ft 2 in (1.88 m)
- Listed weight: 190 lb (86 kg)

Career information
- High school: Crespi Carmelite (Los Angeles, California)
- College: Virginia (2013–2017)
- NBA draft: 2017: undrafted
- Playing career: 2017–present

Career history
- 2017–2018: Cleveland Cavaliers
- 2017–2018: →Canton Charge
- 2018: Limoges
- 2018–2019: Cholet
- 2019–2020: Bahçeşehir
- 2020: Capital City Go-Go
- 2021: Austin Spurs
- 2021–2023: Hapoel Gilboa Galil
- 2023–2025: Kolossos Rodou
- 2025–2026: Maroussi
- 2026–present: Science City Jena

Career highlights
- Second-team All-ACC (2017)
- Stats at NBA.com
- Stats at Basketball Reference

London Tyus Perrantes Jr. (born October 3, 1994) is an American professional basketball player for Science City Jena of the German Basketball Bundesliga (BBL). He played college basketball for the Virginia Cavaliers, where he was selected All-ACC Second Team during his senior season. Perrantes went undrafted in the 2017 NBA draft and played one season for the Cleveland Cavaliers, with whom he reached the 2018 NBA Finals.

== High school career ==
Perrantes attended Crespi Carmelite High School, where he was coached by Russell White. Perrantes developed his signature calm, deliberate playing style after competing against older players. He was noticed by Washington State football player Nico Grasu, who alerted the university's basketball coach, Tony Bennett. When Bennett was hired by Virginia, Perrantes committed to play for him, turning down an offer from USC after Kevin O'Neill was released as coach. As a senior, he averaged 19.9 points and 5.8 assists per game and was named L.A. Daily News Player of the Year and L.A. Times All-Area First Team. He was ranked No. 86 on ESPN's Top 100 recruiting list for 2013.

== College career ==
As a freshman, Perrantes helped lead Virginia to the NCAA Tournament's Sweet 16 for the first time in 19 years while starting 33 games and shooting 44% from behind the arc. On the season, he averaged 5.5 points and a team-high 3.8 assists per game. He was suspended the first game of his sophomore season for violating undisclosed team rules. He scored a career-high 26 points in a match against Miami on January 1, 2015. Perrantes broke his nose and suffered a mild concussion after colliding with Malcolm Brogdon in a win against Florida State on February 22. He averaged 6.4 points and 4.6 assists per game as a sophomore, helping to propel the Cavaliers to a 30–4 record and second straight Atlantic Coast Conference regular-season title.

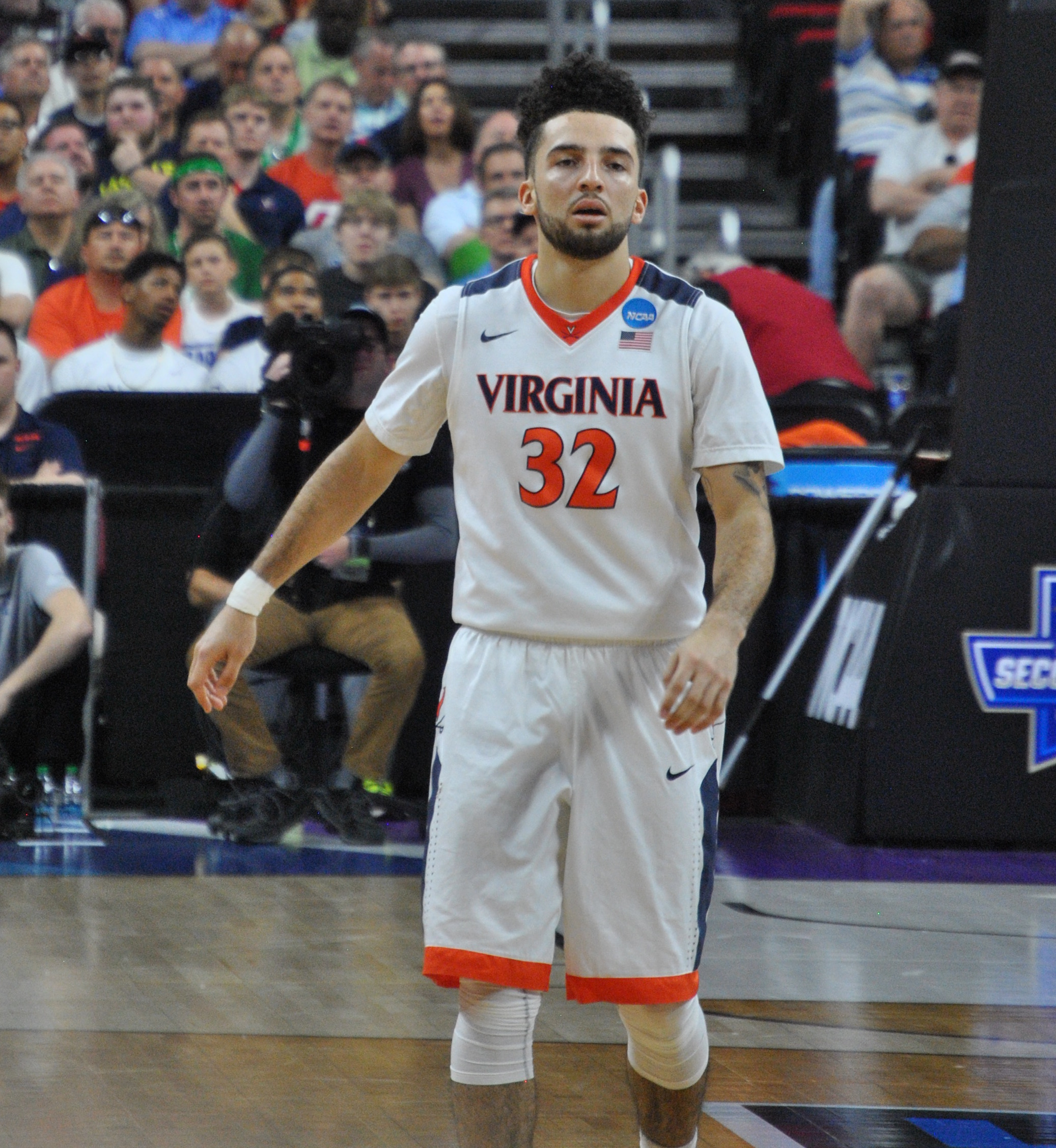
Perrantes in the 2016 NCAA Tournament

As a junior, Perrantes became more of a vocal leader on the team, identifying himself as the player who picked the team up when it was dragging. He hit a career-high seven three-pointers to go along with 22 points in a loss to Virginia Tech on January 4, 2016. Perrantes scored 16 points with four 3-pointers in a 73–65 win against Syracuse on January 24. Perrantes averaged 11.0 points, 4.4 assists and 3.0 rebounds per game, shooting 43.9 percent from the field, 48.8 percent from 3-point range and 80.3 percent from the free-throw line. He was named honorable mention All-ACC by the media and coaches. "He just stirred the pot," coach Bennett said of Perrantes in 2016. "He made everything kind of work out. He got guys the ball. He understood it."

As a senior, Perrantes was named to the Second Team All-Atlantic Coast Conference. His season ended with a 65–39 loss to Florida in the NCAA Tournament. Perrantes averaged 12.7 points and 3.8 assists per game. He tied a program record with 138 games played and scored 1,225 points in his Virginia career.

== Professional career ==
After going undrafted in the 2017 NBA draft, Perrantes signed a summer league deal with the Miami Heat. On August 23, 2017, Perrantes signed with the San Antonio Spurs. He was waived before the season began on October 12, 2017. On October 18, 2017, Perrantes signed a two-way contract with the Cleveland Cavaliers. That meant throughout the rest of that season, he had split his playing time between the Cavaliers and their NBA G League affiliate, the Canton Charge.

Perrantes would make his NBA debut on December 12, playing three minutes in a 123–114 win over the Atlanta Hawks. The Cavaliers made it to the 2018 NBA Finals, but lost 4–0 to the Golden State Warriors. On June 12, 2018, Perrantes was waived by the Cavaliers.

On July 23, 2018, Perrantes signed a one-year deal with French side Limoges. On November 16, 2018, Perrantes was released by Limoges CSP.

On November 18, 2018, Perrantes joined Cholet Basket.

On June 25, 2019, Perrantes joined the New Orleans Pelicans for the 2019 NBA Summer League.

On September 12, 2019, Perrantes joined the Portland Trail Blazers for training camp, but was later waived by the Trail Blazers on October 18.

On November 11, 2019, Perrantes joined the Bahçeşehir Basketbol.

On January 21, 2020, the Capital City Go-Go announced that they had acquired Perrantes from Canton Charge in exchange for the returning right to Gabe York.

On December 18, 2020, Perrantes was signed by the San Antonio Spurs, and was then waived the next day. He was then added to the Spurs' G League affiliate, the Austin Spurs.

On August 22, 2021, he signed with Hapoel Gilboa Galil of the Israeli Premier League. During the 2022–2023 season, he averaged 11.8 points, 3.2 rebounds and 6.6 assists in 19 games.

On August 8, 2023, Perrantes moved to Greek club Kolossos Rodou, where he spent the following two seasons. On August 6, 2025, Perrantes signed a two-year deal with Maroussi. On October 21, 2026, Perrantes signed with Science City Jena of the German Basketball Bundesliga.

== NBA career statistics ==
Legend
GP	Games played	GS	Games started	MPG	Minutes per game
FG%	Field goal percentage	3P%	3-point field goal percentage	FT%	Free throw percentage
RPG	Rebounds per game	APG	Assists per game	SPG	Steals per game
BPG	Blocks per game	PPG	Points per game	**Bold**	Career high

=== Regular season ===
Year	Team	GP	GS	MPG	FG%	3P%	FT%	RPG	APG	SPG	BPG	PPG
2017–18	Cleveland	14	0	4.7	.154	.000	.600	.3	.4	.1	.1	0.5
